= List of Lithuanian women artists =

This is a list of women artists who were born in Lithuania or whose artworks are closely associated with that country.

== B ==
- Gintautėlė Laimutė Baginskienė (born 1940), painter
- Marija Bankauskaitė (1933–1992), ceramist
- Angelina Banytė (born 1949), painter
- Danguolė Brogienė (born 1959), textile designer

== D ==
- Viktorija Daniliauskaitė (born 1951), printmaker, illustrator
- Zinaida Irutė Dargienė (born 1936), textile artist
- Gražina Degutytė-Švažienė (born 1938), ceramist
- Dalia Dokšaitė (born 1955), painter

== E ==
- Danutė Eidukaitė (1929–1995), ceramist

== G ==
- Aldona Gustas (born 1932), poet, illustrator, now in Germany

== H ==
- Lena Himmelstein (1877–1951), Lithuanian-born American clothing designer

== J ==
- Lilija Eugenija Jasiūnaitė (born 1944), painter, textile artist
- Ramutė Aleksandra Jasudytė (born 1930), textile artist
- Rūta Jokubonienė (1930–2010), textile artist
- Aldona Jonuškaitė-Šaltenienė (born 1943), ceramist
- Virginija Juršienė (born 1950), ceramist

== K ==
- Virginija Kalinauskaitė (born 1957), graphic artist
- Zinaida Kalpokovaitė-Vogėlienė (born 1941), textile artist
- Viktorija Karatajūtė-Šarauskienė (1948–2007), ceramist
- Ramunė Kmieliauskaitė (1960–2020), graphic artist, painter
- Lolita Kreivaitienė (born 1960), designer
- Zita Kreivytė (born 1942), fashion designer, painter
- Elvyra Katalina Kriaučiūnaitė (born 1942), Argentine-born Lithuanian graphic artist
- Raminta Elena Kuprevičienė (born 1938), paper restorer
- Jolanta Kvašytė (born 1956), ceramist

== L ==
- Jovita Laurušaitė (born 1956), painter, ceramist
- Violeta Laužonytė (born 1955), textile artist
- Filomena Linčiūtė-Vaitiekūnienė (born 1942), set designer, painter

== M ==
- Marija Mačiulienė (born 1929), painter
- Anortė Mackelaitė (born 1930), stained glass artist

== O ==
- Vita Opolskytė (born 1992), painter

== P ==
- Paulina Pukytė (born 1966), artist, writer
- Grytė Pintukaitė (born 1977), painter portraitist

== R ==
- Eglė Rakauskaitė (born 1967), visual artist
- Zofia Romer (1885–1972), Lithuanian-born Polish painter

== S ==
- Indrė Šerpytytė (born 1983), contemporary artist based in London
- Esther Shalev-Gerz (born 1957), contemporary artist

== T ==
- Irena Trečiokaitė-Žebenkienė (1909–1985), painter

== V ==
- Sofija Veiverytė (1926–2009), monumental painter, educator
