= List of Lithuanian artists =

A list of notable Lithuanian artists.

== A ==
- Kazys Abromavičius (b. 1928)
- Gediminas Akstinas (b. 1961)
- Romualdas Aleliūnas (1960–2016)
- Zita Alinskaitė-Mickonienė (b. 1939)
- Viktoras Andriušis (1908–1967)
- Aleksas Andriuškevičius (b. 1959)
- Kęstutis Andziulis (b. 1948)
- Valentinas Antanavičius (b. 1936)
- Kęstutis Antanėlis (b. 1951)
- Robertas Antinis (b. 1946)
- Neemija Arbitblatas (1908–1999)
- Jonas Arčikauskas (b. 1957)

== B ==
- Juozas Bagdonas (1911–2005)
- Arvydas Bagdžius (1958–2008)
- Gintautėlė Laimutė Baginskienė (b. 1940)
- Ona Baliukonė (1948–2007)
- Marija Bankauskaitė (1933–1992)
- Angelina Banytė (b. 1949)
- Gediminas Baravykas (1940–1995)
- Aidas Bareikis (b. 1967)
- Ray Bartkus (b. 1961)
- Vitalija Bartkuvienė (1939–1996)
- Edmundas Benetis (b. 1953)
- Vladimiras Beresniovas (b. 1948)
- Ilja Bereznickas (b. 1948)
- Vytautas Pranas Bičiūnas (1893–1945)
- Eglė Bogdanienė (b. 1962)
- Alina Briedelytė-Kavaliauskienė (1942–1992)
- Albertas Broga (b. 1951)
- Danguolė Brogienė (b. 1959)
- Konstancija Brundzaitė (1942–1971)
- Bronius Bružas (b. 1941)
- Eugenijus Mindaugas Budrys (1925–2007)
- Ignas Budrys (1933–1999)
- Ona Danutė Buivydaitė (b. 1947)
- Bernardas Bučas (1903–1979)
- Nijolė Būraitė (b. 1956)

== Č ==
- Vytautas Edmundas Čekanauskas (1930–2010)
- Gražutė Čepaitė-Ragauskienė (b. 1940)
- Mikalojus Konstantinas Čiurlionis (1875–1911)

== D ==
- Romas Dalinkevičius (1950–2001)
- Jonas Damelis (1780–1840)
- Viktorija Daniliauskaitė (b. 1951)
- Jonas Daniliauskas (b. 1950)
- Zinaida Irutė Dargienė (b. 1936)
- Feliksas Daukantas (1915–1995)
- Gražina Degutytė-Švažienė (b. 1938)
- Gražina Didžiūnaitytė (1940–2008)
- Boleslovas Dluskis (1826–1905)
- Mykolas Dluskis (1760–1821)
- Vincentas Dmachauskas (1807–1862)
- Vsevolodas Dobužinskis (1906–1998)
- Pranas Domšaitis (1880–1965)
- Olga Dubeneckienė (1891–1967)
- Vladimiras Dubeneckis (1888–1932)
- Audrius Dzikaras (b. 1957)
- Rimantas Dūda (b. 1953)
- Marija Dūdienė (b. 1927)

== E ==
- Stasys Eidrigevičius (b. 1949)
- Danutė Eidukaitė (1929–1995)
- Albinas Elskus (1926–2007)

== F ==
- Vaclava Fleri (1888–1983)

== G ==
- Adomas Galdikas (1893–1969)
- Petronėlė Gerlikienė (1905–1979)
- Albertas Gurskas (b. 1935)
- Aldona Gustas (b. 1932)

== J ==
- Osvaldas Jablonskis (b. 1944)
- Feliksas Jakubauskas (b. 1949)
- Antanas Janauskas (1937–2016)
- Vladas Jankauskas (1923–1983)
- Juozas Jankus (1912–1999)
- Vytautas Janulionis (1958–2010)
- Stanislovas Jančiukas (1937–2006)
- Antanas Jaroševičius (1870–1956)
- Lilija Eugenija Jasiūnaitė (b. 1944)
- Ramutė Aleksandra Jasudytė (b. 1930)
- Vidmantas Jažauskas (b. 1961)
- Rūta Jokubonienė (1930–2010)
- Aldona Jonuškaitė-Šaltenienė (b. 1943)
- Vytautas Kazimieras Jonynas (1907–1997)
- Eugenijus Kazimieras Jovaiša (b. 1940)
- Dalia Juknevičiūtė (1935–1975)
- Jaronimas Kastytis Juodikaitis (1932–2000)
- Paulius Jurkus (1916–2004)
- Virginija Juršienė (b. 1950)
- Vidmantas Jusionis (b. 1961)

== K ==
- Juozas Kalinauskas (b. 1935)
- Virginija Kalinauskaitė (b. 1957)
- Petras Kalpokas (1880–1945)
- Zinaida Kalpokovaitė-Vogėlienė (b. 1941)
- Juozas Kamarauskas (1874–1946)
- Juozas Kaminskas (1898–1957)
- Viktorija Karatajūtė-Šarauskienė (b. 1948)
- Eugenijus Karpavičius (1953–2010)
- Kęstutis Kasparavičius (b. 1954)
- Jonas Kaupys (1941–2000)
- Steponas Kazimieraitis (1933–1995)
- Arvydas Každailis (b. 1939)
- Žilvinas Kempinas (b. 1969)
- Augis Kepežinskas (b. 1948)
- Galius Kličius (b. 1950)
- Boleslovas Klova (1927–1986)
- Ramunė Kmieliauskaitė (b. 1960)
- Gurwin Kopel (1923–1990)
- Kęstutis Krasauskas (b. 1968)
- Lolita Kreivaitienė (b. 1960)
- Zita Kreivytė (b. 1942)
- Ona Kreivytė-Naruševičienė (b. 1935)
- Lazar Krestin (1868–1938)
- Elvyra Katalina Kriaučiūnaitė (b. 1942)
- Remigijus Kriukas (b. 1961)
- Antanas Krištopaitis (1921–2011)
- Vaclovas Krutinis (1948–2013)
- Marijonas Kuleša (1878–1943)
- Mykolas Kuleša (1799–1863)
- Alfredas Kulpa-Kulpavičius (1923–2007)
- Raminta Elena Kuprevičienė (b. 1938)
- Jolanta Kvašytė (b. 1956)
- Jonas Kvederavičius (1923–2002)
- Danutė Kvietkevičiūtė (b. 1939)

== L ==
- Romualdas Lankauskas (1932–2020)
- Jovita Laurušaitė (b. 1956)
- Violeta Laužonytė (b. 1955)
- Šarūnas Leonavičius (b. 1960)
- Inga Likšaitė (b. 1972)
- Filomena Linčiūtė-Vaitiekūnienė (b. 1942)
- Aldona Ličkutė-Jusionienė (1928–2007)
- Laimutis Ločeris (1929–2018)
- Česlovas Lukenskas (b. 1959)
- Kęstutis Lupeikis (b. 1962)
- Juozas Lebednykas (b. 1947)

== M ==
- Marija Mackelaitė (b. 1930)
- Kiprijonas Maculevičius
- Balys Macutkevičius (1905–1964)
- Marija Mačiulienė (b. 1929)
- Vilmantas Marcinkevičius (b. 1969)
- Lidija Meškaitytė (1926–1993)
- Kazys Morkūnas (1925–2014)

== N ==
- Kazimieras Naruševičius (1920–2004)
- Henrikas Natalevičius (b. 1953)

== O ==
- Vita Opolskytė (b. 1992)

== P ==
- Andrius Petkus (b. 1976), sculptor
- Algirdas Petrulis (1915–2010)
- Stasys Povilaitis (1947–2015) (jaunesnysis)
- Grytė Pintukaite (b. 1977)

== R ==
- Petras Repšys (b. 1940)
- Vytenis Rimkus (b. 1930)
- Petras Rimša (1881–1961)
- Bronislovas Rudys (b. 1954)

== S ==
- Šarūnas Sauka (b. 1958)
- Lasar Segall (1891–1957)
- Nikodemas Silvanavičius (1834–1919)
- Algis Skačkauskas (1955–2009)
- Pranciškus Smuglevičius (1745–1807)
- Gintaras Sodeika (b. 1961)
- Vigintas Stankus (b. 1962)
- Aloyzas Stasiulevičius (b. 1931)
- Liudvikas Strolis (1905–1996)
- Yehezkel Streichman (1906–1993)

== Š ==
- Kazys Šimonis (1887–1978)
- Rimantas Šulskis (1943–1995)

== T ==
- Domicėlė Tarabildienė (1912–1985)
- Vytautas Tomaševičius (b. 1972)
- Virgilijus Trakimavičius (b. 1958)
- Ivanas Trutnevas (1827–1912)

== V ==
- Vytautas Valius (1930–2004)
- Adomas Varnas (1879–1979)
- Kazys Varnelis (1917–2010)
- Audra Vau (b. 1965)
- Sofija Veiverytė (1926–2009)
- Liudas Vilimas (1912–1966)
- Bronius Vyšniauskas (1923–2015)
- Petras Vyšniauskas (b. 1957)

== Ž ==
- Irena Trečiokaitė-Žebenkienė (1909–1985)
- Antanas Žmuidzinavičius (1876–1966)
- Algimantas Žižiūnas (b. 1940)
