= Ona (name) =

Ona is a given name and a surname. Notable people with the name include:

== Given name ==
- Aldona of Lithuania (c. 1309–1339), baptized Ona, Lithuanian princess and Polish queen consort
- Ona Baliukonė (1948–2007), Lithuanian poet and painter
- Ona Batlle (born 1999), Spanish football player
- Ona Carbonell (born 1990), Spanish synchronized swimmer
- Ona Danutė Buivydaitė (born 1947), Lithuanian artist and designer
- Ona Dodd (1886–1956), American baseball player
- Ona Dokalskaitė-Paškevičienė (1912–2007), Lithuanian-American painter
- Ona Galdikaitė (1898–1990), Lithuanian poet, nun and dissident
- Ona Grauer (born 1975), Mexican-Canadian actress
- Ona Huczkowski (born 2002), Finnish actress
- Ona Judge Staines (1773–1848), American fugitive slave
- Ona Juknevičienė (born 1955), Lithuanian politician
- Ona Kreivytė-Naruševičienė (born 1935), Lithuanian ceramic artist
- Ona Mašiotienė, (1883–1949), Lithuanian writer, activist and educator
- Ona F. Meens (1886–1980), American educator
- Ona Meseguer (born 1988), Spanish water polo player
- Ona Munson (1903–1955), American actress in Gone with the Wind
- Ona Muraškaitė-Račiukaitienė (1896–?), Lithuanian educator and politician
- Ona Narbutienė (1930–2007), Lithuanian musicologist and educator
- Ona Šimaitė (1894–1970), Lithuanian librarian who used her position to aid and rescue Jews in the Vilna Ghetto
- Anna, Grand Duchess of Lithuania (1392–1418) or Ona Vytautienė, first wife of Vytautas
- Ona Zee (born 1951), American pornographic actress and model

== Surname ==
- Bryan Oña (born 1993), Ecuadorian football player
- Carl Ona-Embo (born 1989), French-Congolese basketball player
- Cynthia Ona Innis (born 1969), American artist
- Daniel Ona Ondo (born 1945), Gabonese politician
- Domingo de Oña (1560–1626), Spanish bishop
- Enrique Ona (born 1939), Filipino doctor and politician
- Francis Ona (1953–2005), Papua New Guinea, Bougainville secessionist
- Íñigo of Oña (died 1057), Spanish priest
- Jorge Oña (born 1996), Cuban baseball player
- Marc Ona, Gabonese environmentalist
- Pedro de Oña (1570–1643), Chilean poet
- Kim On-a (born 1988), South Korean handball player
