= Romualdas =

Romualdas is a Lithuanian masculine given name.

== List of people named Romualdas ==
- Romualdas Aleliūnas (born 1960), Lithuanian designer of ceramics
- Romualdas Bitė (born 1944), Lithuanian athlete
- Romualdas Ignas Bloškys (1936–2013), Lithuanian politician
- Romualdas Brazauskas (born 1960), Lithuanian basketball referee
- Romualdas Granauskas (1939-2014), author and dramaturge
- Romualdas Juška (born 1942), Lithuanian footballer
- Romualdas Kasuba (1931–2019), Lithuanian engineer
- Romualdas Krikščiūnas (1930-2010), apostolic administrator of the Roman Catholic Diocese
- Romualdas Lankauskas (born 1932), Lithuanian writer, playwright and painter
- Romualdas Marcinkus (1907–1944), Lithuanian pilot
- Romualdas Murauskas (1934-1979), boxer from the Soviet Union
- Romualdas Ozolas (born 1939) is a Lithuanian politician, activist, writer and pedagogue
- Romualdas Požerskis (b. 1951), Lithuanian photographer and a 1990 recipient of the Lithuanian National Prize
- Romualdas Ramanauskas (born 1950), Lithuanian film actor
- Romualdas Rudzys (born 1947), Lithuanian politician
- Romualdas Vinojinidis, Soviet sprint canoer who competed in the early 1970s
