= Gražutė Čepaitė-Ragauskienė =

Lithuanian Ceramic artist

Gražutė Čepaitė-Ragauskienė (born 1940 in Nuotekai) is a Lithuanian ceramic artist.

In 1968, she graduated from the Lithuanian Institute of Fine Arts. Since 1968 ceramic works of art in the center (up to 1996 "Art" Works) in Vilnius.

== Works ==
- Creator decorative vessels (vases kits "March", "Fog," both 1978)
- compositions (composition of geometric forms "1976," Shell "1979," The Birds "in 2000)

Her works are mainly in natural shapes, decorate žiestais deformed elements. she combines molding and žiedimą, various surface processes, different texture, engobes, glaze, particularly frequent imitation velvet surface.

Since 1970, she participated in art exhibitions in Lithuania and abroad. She is a member of the Lithuanian Artists' Association since 1978

== See also ==
- List of Lithuanian painters
