= Balys =

- Gender: Male
- Language: Lithuanian
- Name day: 19 August

Origin
- Region of origin: Lithuania

Balys is a Lithuanian masculine given name. People bearing the name Balys include:

- Balys Dvarionas (1904–1972), Lithuanian composer, pianist, conductor, and educator
- Balys Gajauskas (1926–2017), Lithuanian politician
- Balys Macutkevičius (1905–1964), Lithuanian painter
- Balys Sruoga (1896–1947), Lithuanian poet, playwright, critic, and literary theorist
