= Juozas Jankus =

Lithuanian painter

Juozas Jankus (1912 in Sereikoniai, Kovno Governorate – 1999) was a Lithuanian painter.

== Biography ==
In 1936, he graduated from the Kaunas School of Art, majoring in sculpture. From 1937 to 1940, he worked at Šiauliai Teachers' Seminary; 1942–1953, he was in Šiauliai, Klaipėda, and Vilnius drama theaters; 1953–1975, he was Director of the Lithuanian Opera and Ballet Theatre.

== Creation ==
In 1950s and 1960s, he relied mainly on the principles of realism, later on constructivism, and other currents of modernism. The most important works are characterized by a solid style, a harmonious, well-structured composition, a color scheme of bright contrasting colors. Participated in exhibitions since 1936. Works are owned by the Lithuanian Art Museum and the Lithuanian Theater, Music and Cinema Museum.

He was awarded the State Prize; he was given the names of the Meritorious Artist of Lithuania (1954) and People's Artist of Lithuania (1957), as well as many other prizes and awards.

== See also ==
- List of Lithuanian painters
- Universal Lithuanian Encyclopedia
