= Osvaldas =

- Gender: Male
- Language: Lithuanian

Origin
- Region of origin: Lithuania

Osvaldas is a Lithuanian masculine given name. It is a cognate of the name Oswald. Notable people with the name include:

- Osvaldas Balakauskas (1937–2026), Lithuanian composer of classical music and diplomat
- Osvaldas Jablonskis (1944–2026), Lithuanian painter
- Osvaldas Matulionis (born 1991), Lithuanian basketball player
- Osvaldas Olisevičius (born 1993), Lithuanian basketball player
- Osvaldas Pikauskas (1945–1995), Lithuanian-born Soviet and Russian military leader
