= Zita Alinskaitė-Mickonienė =

Lithuanian textile artist

Zita Alinskaitė-Mickonienė (born 5 November 1939) is a Lithuanian textile artist.

In 1969 she graduated from the Lithuanian Art Institute, under the teachers Vladas Daujotas, Zenonas Varnauskas, and Sofija Veiverytė. From 1969 to 1974 she was a carpet factory artist.

Since 1970 she has participated in exhibitions in Lithuania and abroad.

Her early works were based on the composition of stylized, often symbolic figures. Later, her work became more minimalist.

== See also ==
- List of Lithuanian painters
