= Elena Laumenskienė =

Lithuanian composer and pianist (1880–1960)

Elena Stanekaite Laumenskienė (16 July 1880 – 24 March 1960) was a Lithuanian composer, music educator, and pianist who published some music under the name Elena Stanekaite-Laumyanskene. Also Stanek, Moráuskienė, by marriages. She performed as a pianist in Kaunas, Moscow and Vilnius, and composed more than three hundred works. She taught at the Vilnius Conservatory, and in 1930 founded the Lithuanian National Conservatory in Kaunas, which she was then principal of for ten years.

== Life ==
Laumenskienė was born Elena Stanekaite in Radviliškis on 16 July 1880. She graduated from the Moscow Conservatory in 1907, where her teachers included A. Hubert, Alexander Ilyinsky, Konstantin Igumnov, and Alexander Scriabin. She married Laumenskis.

Laumenskienė taught piano in Vilnius at a private music school, and in Moscow at the Music School of the Vilnius Branch of the Russian Music Society. She was in Moscow from 1915 to 1921, and while there she also studied composition with Alexander Ilyinsky. Laumenskienė founded the Lithuanian National Conservatory in Kaunas in 1930, managing it for the next decade. In 1940, she began teaching composition at the Vilnius Conservatory. She was made professor at the Lithuanian Conservatory in 1946. During this time, she presented piano recitals in Kaunas, Moscow, and Vilnius. Her compositions were recorded commercially by Melodija (MELOD D 009587/8). She composed more than 300 works, including songs, romances, and piano pieces. She died in Vilnius on 24 March 1960.

Her students include Jošas Antanavičius, Konstancija Brundzaitė, Vytautas Laurušas, and Bronius Kutavičius.

== Works ==
Laumenskienė's compositions included:

=== Chamber ===
- Mazurka (violin and piano)
- Memories (violin and piano)
- Romance (violin and piano)
- Tarantella (violin and piano)

=== Piano ===
- more than 200 works (preludes, miniatures, children’s pieces)

=== Vocal ===
- approximately 100 songs in Lithuanian
- “Evening”
- “I was Sad in the Night”
- “It is Good for Your Heart”
