= Kavaliauskas =

- Lithuanian surname
- m.: Kavaliauskas
- f.: (unmarried): Kavaliauskaitė
- f.: (married): Kavaliauskienė

Kavaliauskas is the masculine form of a Lithuanian family surname derived from the Polish surname Kowalewski

The surname may refer to:

- Antanas Kavaliauskas (born 1984), Lithuanian professional basketball player
- Egidijus Kavaliauskas (born 1988), Lithuanian professional boxer
- Vitalijus Kavaliauskas (born 1983), Lithuanian footballer
- Alina Briedelytė-Kavaliauskienė (1942–1992), Lithuanian painter
