= Banys =

- Lithuanian surname
- m.: Banys
- f.: (unmarried): Banytė
- f.: (married): Banienė

Banys (feminine: Banienė/Banytė) is a Lithuanian surname. Notable people with the surname include:

- Angelina Banytė (born 1949) Lithuanian painter
- Linas Banys (1998–2026) Lithuanian biathlete
