= Aleliūnas =

Aleliūnas is a Lithuanian surname. Its feminine forms are: Aleliūnienė (married woman or widow) and Aleliūnaitė (unmarried woman). Notable people with the surname include:

- Romualdas Aleliūnas (c. 1959 – 2016), Lithuanian artist
- Vilius Aleliūnas (born 1987), Lithuanian orienteer
