= Lupeikis =

Lupeikis is a Lithuanian surname. Notable people with the surname include:

- Kęstutis Lupeikis (1962–2023), Lithuanian architect and painter
- Remigijus Lupeikis (born 1964), Lithuanian cyclist
