= Jonas Daniliauskas =

Lithuanian painter

Jonas Daniliauskas (born 10 June 1950 Lekėčių) is a Lithuanian painter.

In 1974, he graduated from Lithuanian Institute of Fine Arts; he was a student of Jonas Švažas and Algirdas Petrulis.

== Works ==
His work is in the collection of Edmundas Armoška. He shows at Stasys Juskus Gallery.

== Awards ==
- 1979 the premium of the Lithuanian Ministry of Culture;
- 1985 the first prize of the Lithuanian Ministry of Culture at the 4th Bienalle of the Baltic Countries;
- 1985 the first prize at the 11th Bienalle of the Baltic Countries and Island in Rostok (Germany);
- 1999 the premium of the Lithuanian union of Artists.

== Solo shows ==
- Vilnius - 1976, 1978, 1982, 1989, 1994–1997, 1999, 2000, 2002, 2010
- Kaunas - 1996
- Klaipeda, Lithuania - 1996
- Chandigarh - 1997
- Baden, Switzerland - 1997
- Zurich - 1998
- Greifswald - 1999
- Warsaw - 2000
- London - 2000–2001,

== See also ==
- List of Lithuanian painters
