= Šulskis =

Šulskis is a Lithuanian surname that may refer to

- Rimantas Šulskis (1943–1995), Lithuanian sculptor and painter
- Šarūnas Šulskis (born 1972), Lithuanian chess player
- Vytautas Šulskis (born 1988), Lithuanian basketball player
