= Viktoras =

- Gender: Male
- Language: Lithuanian

Origin
- Region of origin: Lithuania

Other names
- Related names: Viktor, Victor

Viktoras is a Lithuanian masculine given name. It is a cognate of the English name Victor and may refer to:

== People ==
- Viktoras Andriušis (1908–1967), Lithuanian artist and designer
- Viktoras Biržiška (1886–1964), Lithuanian mathematician and writer
- Viktoras Budzinskis (1888–1976), Lithuanian politician
- Viktoras Diawara (born 1978), Lithuanian musician
- Viktoras Kulvinskas (born 1939), American nutritionist and writer
- Viktoras Muntianas (born 1951), Lithuanian politician
- Viktoras Olšanskis (born 1969), Lithuanian footballer
- Viktoras Petkus (1928–2012), Lithuanian political activist
- Viktoras Uspaskich (born 1959), Lithuanian politician

== See also ==
- Victor (name)
