= Grytė Pintukaitė =

Lithuanian portrait painter (born 1977)

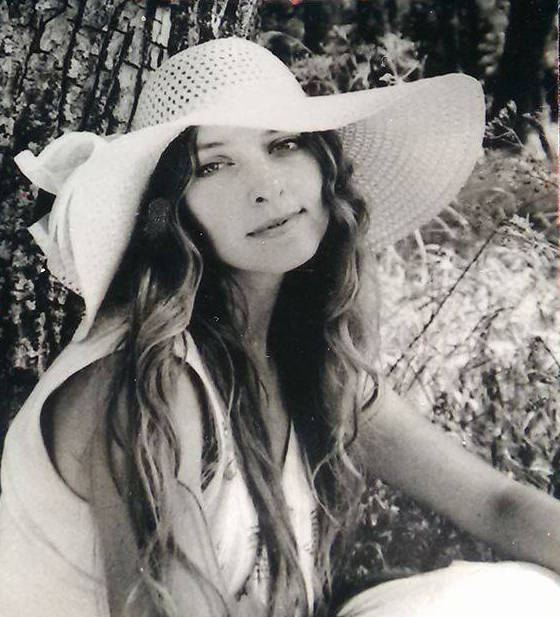
- Born: 16 February 1977 (age 49); Kaunas
- Occupation: Painter
- Writing career
- Genre: Expressionism

Grytė Pintukaitė (born 16 February 1977) is a Lithuanian portrait painter, member of the Lithuanian Artists' Association, and member of the Association LATGA - Lithuanian Copyright Society.

== Education ==
Gryte was born in Kaunas into a family of artists (her father, Algirdas Pintukas, is an actor of Kaunas State Drama Theatre).

After the Art Gymnasium in Kaunas and the Kankaapaa School of Arts in Finland, she studied Painting in Vilnius Academy of Arts (Bachelor and Master of Arts under the supervision of the painters Leopoldas Surgailius and Arvydas Šaltenis). Since 2002 she is also a pedagogue of Arts and curator of exhibitions for young talents.

== Artistic production and vision ==
Regarding her artistic vision and style, the philosopher and art critic Algis Uždavinys wrote about an "intimate female humanism of the artist and "a meditation to feel not only the fragility of the human nature but also the deep nobleness of its incarnated spiritual world, real portrayal and picture of God where she likes to submerge herself, with tender clemency, like in a fog of heady dreams, in order to create her original version of the reality and of the existence myth".

Therefore, her figures are almost always slightly stylized and supplemental semantic metaphors, especially in portrait compositions, are often introduced.

In choosing the subjects of her pictures, Gryte often comes back to loved motives such as an image of a granny or a mother with a baby or just faces, that she loves to draw according to their real emanation, the one that she perceives. So, she could paint, for example, the Lithuanian artist Antanas Tamošaitis, that she met in his hospital bed just some time before his death at the age of 100 years old, as well as many other singers, actors, poets, musicians, conductors, etc. that she painted during almost 25 years of activity.

== Awards ==
- In 2000 she received the award for the best painting in the exhibition "One Picture Contest" in Vilnius.
- In 2004 she received the award for "The best work of the year" in the homonym exhibition in Kaunas.

== Influences from other arts ==
Gryte's training as painter was affected by other artistic disciplines, especially theatre and music (lyric singing).

In Kaunas she studied at the Drama Theatre, got a diploma in Expressive Reading and received "The Silver Voices" (Sidabriniai Balsai) award. As singer, after private studies in Finland, Russia and Lithuania, she collaborated in the years 2001-2003 with the composer Arturas Bumšteinas and, in 2006, with the group Sel.

She also works also as clothes designer for fashion and theatre events and collaborates occasionally with some newspapers and art magazines as art/theatre critic

== Exhibitions ==
From 1993 until 2016, Grytė Pintukaitė has organized 34 personal exhibitions, participated in 63 group exhibitions (the most important were the Venice Biennale in Italy, the Beijing International Art Biennale and the Silk Road International Festival in China) and in 10 international Art Symposia and Plein Airs. She took part also in other international exhibitions in Finland, Belarus, Denmark and Latvia.

The artworks of Grytė Pintukaitė are exhibited in museums in China, Lithuania, Latvia as well as in private collections in USA, England, Italy, Germany, Finland, France, Iceland, Latvia and Russia.

== See also ==
- List of Lithuanian artists
