= Arvydas Bagdžius =

Lithuanian painter (1958–2008)

Arvydas Bagdžius (23 November 1958, in Vilnius, Lithuania – 2 June 2008) was a Lithuanian painter.

== See also ==
- List of Lithuanian painters
