= Aleksas Andriuškevičius =

Lithuanian artist

Aleksas Andriuškevičius (born 1959 in Panevėžys) is a Lithuanian artist.

== Life ==
In 1983 he graduated from the Pedagogical Institute of Siauliai. Since 1988, he has taught at the Kaunas Art Institute.

His early paintings in the 1980s led to the creation of other forms of art, land art, video, with the group "Post Ars", a member since 1989. Since 1990, he has become interested in the process of art, and his work became a predominant expression of Minimalism (a series of drawings "Three hours of work" in 1990), and ("Airplane," "Feathers," both in 1995 etc.)

Since 1983 he has participated in exhibitions and festivals. In 1993, he made an exhibition at the "Europe-Bienal Niederlausitz II" in Germany with the "Post Ars" and won the top prize. At the video festival in the Baltic countries in Riga he won the second prize. His works are on display in Lithuania, Estonia and the Israel Museum.

He lives in Kaunas.

== See also ==
- List of Lithuanian artists
