= Vidmantas Jusionis =

Lithuanian painter (born 1961)

Vidmantas Jusionis (born 17 May 1961 in Vilnius) is a Lithuanian painter.

== Biography ==
Vidmantas Jusionis graduated from the National M. K. Čiurlionis School of Art in Vilnius, Lithuania. From 1979 until 1985 he studied in the Department of Painting of the Vilnius Institute of Arts. In 1985 Jusionis became a lecturer of painting at Šiauliai Pedagogical Institute (now Šiauliai University), where he taught until 1987. In 1987 Jusionis came back to Vilnius and since then he has been working as a teacher of painting at the National M. K. Čiurlionis School of Art.

Jusionis has been a member of the Lithuanian Artists' Association since 1990.

He was an individual recipient of the Lithuanian State Stipend, provided by the Ministry of Culture of the Republic of Lithuania, in 2005–2006.

== Exhibitions ==
=== Significant exhibitions ===
- 2012 “LT00 Painting”, Contemporary Art Center, Vilnius;
- 2012 “Voyage: Landscapes and Mirages” The International Day of Culture, Lithuanian Artists’ Association Gallery;
- 2010 “Lithuanian Season” Painting, Graphics, Sculpture, Alex Gallery/Gallery A, Washington, D.C.;
- 2009 The 2nd Quadrennial of Lithuanian Contemporary Art, Vilnius;
- 2009 International Contemporary Art Fair “ArtVilnius’09”;
- 2009 "Decentrists / Margins: 1 meter Beyond the Painting", European Capital of Culture Project, Vilnius Railway Station;
- 2009 "Four Lives - Four Destinies. Jusioniai", "Arka Gallery", Vilnius, and Klaipėda Art Exhibition Hall, Klaipėda;
- Mobile Lithuanian Artists' Association Collection "70: Painting, Graphics, Sculpture" exhibitions:
  - 2009 Artpark Gallery, Linz, Austria;
  - 2008 "Art Gallery Santa Teresa", Fano, Italy;
  - 2008 Gallery, Italy;
  - 2007 "Jugendsali" Gallery, Helsinki, Finland; Drachten City Museum, the Netherlands; Vilnius Congress Concert Hall;
- 2008 "Artists About Masks", Kaunas’ Public Library, Kaunas;
- 2007 XIII Vilnius Painting Triennial "Dialogues"; Contemporary Art Center, Vilnius;
- 2006 "Ex Improviso", Lithuanian Artists’ Association, "Pamenkalnis Gallery", Vilnius;
- 2006 "New Masks", Art Gallery of the National M. K. Ciurlionis Museum, Kaunas;
- 2005 "Gratulatio Vilnae", "Arka Gallery", Vilnius;
- 2005 "Voyage", "Arka Gallery", Vilnius;
- 2004 XII Vilnius Painting Triennial "Seven Rules of Painting"; Contemporary Art Center, Vilnius;
- 2004 The Biggest Gallery in the New Municipality Building, Vilnius’ City Hall Exposition, Vilnius;
- 2003 Exhibition of the International Painting Symposium "Soutine's Days", dedicated to Ch. Soutine's 110th anniversary, Vilnius Town hall, Vilnius;
- 2003 Painting Exhibition from Estonia, Latvia and Lithuania, Copenhagen, Denmark;
- 2001 Lithuanian Exhibition Cycle in Italy "Art & Magio", Bari, Rome, and Venice, Italy;
- 2000 Exhibition "Tradition and Future", Contemporary Art Center, Vilnius;
- 2000 Lithuanian Painting Exhibition, Warsaw Palace of Culture, Poland;
- 1999 "Contact", V. Jusionis and G. Akstinas, Gallery "Kauno Langas", Kaunas;
- 1999 "Bus Stop", V. Jusionis, G. Akstinas, G. P. Janonis, Klaipėda Art Exhibition Hall, Klaipėda;
- 1999 Painting Exhibition by Algimantas, Stasys, and Vidmantas Jusioniai, Painters’ House; Vilnius;
- 1998 Exhibition "9+9 Lithuanian artists", Aachen Town Hall, Germany;
- 1997 Lithuanian Painting Exhibition "Magical Realism", Manezh, Saint Petersburg, Russia;
- 1997 "Vartai Gallery" Artists’ Exhibition in the Latvian Artists’ Association Gallery, Riga, Latvia;
- 1996 X Vilnius Painting Triennial, Contemporary Art Center, Vilnius.

=== Group painting exhibitions ===
- 1992, 1994, 1996, 1999 Group Exhibitions in Gallery 2112, Copenhagen, Denmark;
- 1985, 1988 Baltic States Fine Arts Triennial of the Young Artists, Vilnius.

=== Personal exhibitions ===
- 2011 “Vidmantas Jusionis: Painting”, Pamenkalnio Art Gallery, Vilnius;
- 2008 "Vidmantas Jusionis: Painting", Schloss Reinbek Castle, Hamburg, Germany;
- 2006 "Vidmantas Jusionis: Painting", Klaipėda Art Gallery; Klaipėda;
- 2006 Painting Exhibition "Sensitives", "Lietuvos Aidas Gallery", Vilnius;
- 2005 Painting Exhibition "On People", Gallery "Aukso Pjuvis" at the Business Leaders’ Centre, Kaunas;
- 2003–2004 Painting Exhibition "Valleys", "Vartai Gallery", Vilnius;
- 2003 V. Jusionis’ Painting Exhibition, Vilnius Congress Concert Hall; Vilnius;
- 1992, 1994, 1996, 1999 Personal Exhibitions in "Vartai Gallery", Vilnius;
- 1995 Painting Exhibition, "Arka Gallery", Vilnius.
