= Albertas Broga =

Lithuanian illustrator

Albertas Broga (born 1951) is a Lithuanian illustrator, noted for his poster designs.

Between 1969 and 1974, Broga studied at the Lithuanian Institute of Art and from 1975 to 1978, he worked in the Lithuanian Conservatory Klaipeda Faculties Division of Fine Arts. Since 2000, he has contributed to the Universal Lithuanian Encyclopedia.

== See also ==
- List of Lithuanian painters
