= Remigijus Kriukas =

Lithuanian painter

Remigijus Kriukas (born on March 14, 1961 in Panevėžys) is a Lithuanian glass artist.

== See also ==
- List of Lithuanian painters
- Universal Lithuanian Encyclopedia
