= Česlovas Lukenskas =

Lithuanian sculpture and performance artist

Česlovas Lukenskas (born 3 July 1959 Panevėžys) is a Lithuanian sculpture and performance artist.

He studied at Panevėžys J. Švedas Music Conservatoiry in 1974–78. Between 1978 and 1982 he studied at Vilnius Evening Art School. Between 1978 and 1984, he studied at the Lithuanian Academy of Music, where he studied saxophone. In 1984–87, he taught music at Karmėlava Secondary School, and in 1987-97 taught the saxophone at Kaunas J. Gruodis Conservatoiry. Starting in 1989, he created a series of work titled "Thrown into a Monument", "Thrown Out Man", "Thrown Out Children", and "Thrown Out Students". From 1999, he has been lecturing at VAA, Kaunas Art Institute. Since 2005, he belongs to the Lithuanian Artists’ Union.

He is a member of Post Ars group. He showed at the National Museum of Fine Arts, LDM Radvilles Palace, and Panevėžys Civic Art Gallery.

== See also ==
- List of Lithuanian painters
