= Stanislovas Jančiukas =

Lithuanian fashion designer (1937–2006)

Stanislovas Jančiukas (5 November 1937 – 18 October 2006) was a Lithuanian fashion designer.

== Biography ==
In 1969, he graduated from the Art Institute in Tallinn, Estonia. In 1969–1994, he worked as an artist at the "art" factory in Vilnius.

== Works ==
Creator albums, diaries, notebooks, leather goods products for mass production standards, honor, reviews of books, folders, greetings and more. Works characterized by subtle forms of modeliuotė, figurative, architect. motives and style of harmony. Since 1970 participates in exhibitions and solo exhibitions held in Vilnius 1997

The most important works: the book reviews and maps exposition in the Trakai History Museum, in 1973–1975, "Album", 1976, panels and guest books ship "Lithuania", 1979, and honorary guest book at Vilnius University in 1979, a notebook with initials, 1986, photo boxes, 1988, J guestbook. Basanaviciaus Ožkabaliuose Museum, 2002.

== See also ==
- List of Lithuanian artists
