= Paulius Jurkus =

Lithuanian painter

Paulius Jurkus (1916–2004) was a Lithuanian painter.

== See also ==
- List of Lithuanian painters
