= Jonas Kvederavičius =

Lithuanian painter

Jonas Kvederavičius (1923–2002) was a Lithuanian painter.

== See also ==
- List of Lithuanian painters
