= Valentinas Antanavičius =

Lithuanian painter (1936–2024)

Valentinas Antanavičius (2 May 1936 – 20 September 2024) was a Lithuanian painter. In 1992 he won a Lithuanian national arts award.

== Biography ==
In 1962 he graduated from the Lithuanian Institute of Art. From 1962 he taught at the M. K. Čiurlionis arts school; also since 1988 the Vilnius Academy of Fine Arts.

Antanavičius was a painter of portraits featuring cultural figures, as well as a and printmaker. He was one of the most famous assemblage artists in Lithuania. His works of the main character, are constructed in the form of the human figure. He was a member of "Group 24".

From 1962, Antanavičius held 15 solo exhibitions. He died on 20 September 2024, at the age of 88.

== See also ==
- List of Lithuanian artists
