= Gražina Didžiūnaitytė =

Lithuanian painter

Gražina Didžiūnaitytė (18 January 1940 – 24 October 2008) was a Lithuanian glass artist.

== See also ==
- List of Lithuanian painters
