= Petras Repšys =

Lithuanian artist (born 1940)

Petras Repšys (born 1940) is a Lithuanian artist.

In 1994 the University of Vilnius adopted his rendition of its coat of arms. His fresco "The Seasons of the Year" is prominently displayed at the university.

== See also ==
- List of Lithuanian painters
