= Kazys Abromavičius =

Lithuanian painter

Kazys Valdemaras Abromavičius (4 March 1928 in Kulautuva–18 August 2008) was a Lithuanian painter.

He graduated from the Lithuanian Art Institute in 1954 with stained-glass as his specialty. From 1954 to 1957 he worked in Kaunas, from 1960 to 1964 at the Ministry of Culture and 1964–1980 at the Lithuanian Art Museum.

He was noted for his watercolor landscapes such as the Curonian Lagoon in 1979, Nida Dunes in 1986, and Sunflowers in 1997. He is also a portrait painter, his paintings such as The Actress Eugenija Pleškytė in 1970 and Woman with the Hat (1996), characterized by lyricism and use of transparent color.

In 1956, he was discovered by Lida Meškaitytė. Since 1957, he has participated in many exhibitions, and held individual exhibitions. His works are in the museums in Lithuania and Latvia (Riga).

== See also ==
- List of Lithuanian artists
- Visuotinė lietuvių enciklopedija
