= Algirdas Petrulis =

Lithuanian painter (1915–2010)

Algirdas Petrulis (16 January 1915 – 25 January 2010) was a Lithuanian painter.

Petrulis studied at the Kaunas School of Art. He later taught at the Vilnius State Art Institute (now the Vilnius Academy of Fine Arts). He became an associate professor in 1968.

He was interested in modern French art, and his artwork was richly nuanced with a highly sensitive color palette.

From 1946, he was a member of the Lithuanian Artists' Association. He won the prestigious Lithuanian National Prize in 1995 and was awarded the Grand Duke Gediminas Order of the Commander's Cross, the St. Christopher statuette, and the Gold Label of the Lithuanian Artists' Union.
