= Viktoras Andriušis =

Viktoras Andriušis (January 10, 1908 – March 27, 1967) was a Lithuanian artist and designer.

He graduated from Kaunas Art School in 1931. From 1931 to 1944 he worked at the State Theater in Kaunas (1941–1944 at the Kaunas Grand Theater) as a set designer and artist. He created the scenery for many drama, opera, and ballet performances. In 1944 he moved to Germany, and in 1949 to the United States.

He died in 1967.

== See also ==
- List of Lithuanian painters
