= Bronius Bružas =

Lithuanian stained glass artist

Bronius Bružas (born 25 March 1941 Rokiškis) is a Lithuanian stained glass artist.

In 1967, he graduated from the Lithuanian Art Institute (now Vilnius Art Academy). From 1969 to 1985, he worked in the "Art" factory, from 1985 to 1997; he worked in The sculptures and monumental art studio in Vilnius; since 1990, he has taught at the Vilnius Academy of Fine Arts.

Since 1967, he has developed and implemented more than 70 stained glass and stained-glass cycles, in social, religious, and private interiors in both Lithuania and abroad.

He participated in numerous exhibitions both in the republic and abroad, for example. JAV, Lenkijoje, Arabijoje, Suomijoje U.S., Poland, Arabia, Finland, “Vitražas 2009″, and International Symposium of stained glass.

== Awards ==
- 1981 Russian Academy of Arts diploma.
- 1983 Lithuanian National Prize

== Competitions ==
- 1976 Lithuanian Embassy in Moscow to create stained glass
- 1990 St. George's Church in Warsaw creating stained glass.

== See also ==
- List of Lithuanian painters
- Zovienė Danutė, Bronius Bružas, 2004, Leidėjas "Artseria", 56 p., ISBN 9986-716-36-5
