= Rimantas Dūda =

Lithuanian painter

- Born: June 26, 1953; Kučgali, Biržai, Lithuania, Soviet Union
- Died: January 18, 2017 (aged 63)
- Education: National M. K. Čiurlionis School of Art, Tallinn Art Institute
- Known for: Lithuanian artistic bookbinding

Rimantas Dūda (July 26, 1953 – January 18, 2017) was a Lithuanian painter and bookbinder. He was a part of the Vilniaus Dailės kombinato, Soviet-era art factories, from 1977 to 1997 producing paintings. He is known for creating unique leather goods, including boxes and decorated books, which are now on display at the Lithuanian National Museum of Art.

== See also ==
- List of Lithuanian painters
