= Gediminas Akstinas =

Lithuanian painter

Gediminas Akstinas (born 1 August 1961 in Vilnius, Lithuania) is a Lithuanian sculptor.

== Biography ==
He graduated from the Pedagogical Institute of Šiauliai in 1986. Since 1994, he has at taught at the M. K. Čiurlionis Arts Gymnasium.

His works range from small ("Lentynėlė - the song" in 1990), large ("carriage" in 1998), most portable, some of the composite link to a specific location ("heave" in 1995). The paradoxical and conceptual approach emphasizes intelligent, suddenly adapt and interpret the seemingly domestic objects; creation affects the twentieth century Western art direction (Dada, Surrealism, New Realism, etc.)

== See also ==
- List of Lithuanian painters
