= Nijolė Būraitė =

Lithuanian painter and painting restorer (born 1956)

Nijolė Būraitė (born 17 January 1956 in Druskininkai) is a Lithuanian painter and painting restorer.

In 1982, she graduated from the Lithuanian Institute of Fine Arts. Since 1976, she has worked on restoring wall paintings.

== See also ==
- List of Lithuanian artists

== Sources ==
- 'Nijolė Būraitė. Visuotinė lietuvių enciklopedija, T. III (Beketeriai-Chakasai). V.: Mokslo ir enciklopedijų leidybos institutas, 2003, 623 psl'
