= Steponas Kazimieraitis =

Lithuanian painter and stained glass artist

Steponas Kazimieraitis (1 April 1933, in Gaschiunai – 6 January 1995, in Vilnius) was a Lithuanian painter and stained glass artist.

He graduated from the Lithuanian Art Institute in 1959 and began working in the Vilnius Art Factory in 1961. His stained glass adorns the Palanga Amber Museum, as well as embassies of Guinea and Zambia in Moscow.

== See also ==
- List of Lithuanian painters
