= Gediminas Baravykas =

Lithuanian architect

Gediminas Baravykas (12 April 1940, Pasvalys – 25 February 1995, Vilnius) was a Lithuanian architect.

== Life and career ==
In 1958, he graduated from the Salome Neris Vilnius Secondary School. He graduated from the State Art Institute of the Lithuanian SSR, after which (1964) he worked at the Institute of Urban Construction Design in Vilnius as an architect, then as a group leader (1970-1975), chief architect of projects (1975-1984), and since 1984, the head of the department. In 1985-1987, he was the chief architect at that institution, and then in 1990-1992, he was the chief architect of the department of the Institute of Urban Construction Design.

Since 1978, he was a member of the CPSU. Between 1987-1990, he was the Chief Architect, and Head of the Main Department of Architecture and Urban Planning of the city of Vilnius. From 1988, he was a Corresponding Member of the USSR Academy of Arts. He was a People's Deputy of the USSR from the Union of Architects of the USSR. He was a member of the Committee of the Supreme Soviet of the USSR on architecture and construction. From 1992 through 1995, he was head of the Urbis design company.

Some of the projects he was involved in include:

- a statue of Zigmas Angarietis in Vilnius (1972)
- a tombstone for Lithuanian priest Jonas Ragauskas (1973)
- a statue of poet Salomėja Nėris in Vilnius (1974)
- a memorial on the sight of "Oflag53" concentration camp in Pagėgiai (1977)
- parts of what is now Vytautas Magnus University Education Academy (1977/78)
- part of what is now the Lithuanian National Museum of Art (1980)
- Šeškinė shopping centre (1984)
- a statue of Juozas Naujalis in Raudondvaris (1994)

== See also ==
- List of Lithuanian artists
