= Virginija Juršienė =

Lithuanian ceramic artist (born 1950)

Virginija Jasiūnaitė-Juršienė (born 16 July 1950 in Biržai) is a Lithuanian ceramic artist.

== Life ==
She grew up in Vilnius, and graduated from M. K. Čiurlionis School of Art in sculpture, in 1974. She studied from the Lithuanian Institute of Art. From 1976 to 1996, she was Vilnius Painting Factory artist, and member of the Lithuanian Artists' Association.

== Works ==
Ceramic Works ("Aliens" in 1986, "Delay" in 1987, Meadow town "in 1996," Colourful portrait of 2004, "Women of nowhere" in 2005) post-modern in direction, characterized by conceptuality, experimentation. Creator of assemblages, objects, installations ("unstable" in 2001, "The book – Inversion" in 2003, "Class" in 2004)

She participated in the Global Applied Arts Competition Kanadzava 1999. Her works are in the collection of the Lithuanian Art Museum, National Museum of Fine Arts, Čiurlionis, and Lithuanian National Museum.

== Solo exhibitions ==
- 1981 creative exhibition gallery in Erfurt, Germany
- Creative Exhibition 1992 "ark", Vilnius
- 1992 Creative Exhibition Hall Art Gallery, Kedainiai
- 1993 Creative Exhibition Gallery of Medals, Vilnius
- 1996 Exhibition-figure pottery "Arka" gallery, Vilnius

== See also ==
- List of Lithuanian artists
