= Olga Dubeneckienė =

Lithuanian and Soviet painter

Olga Dubeneckiene
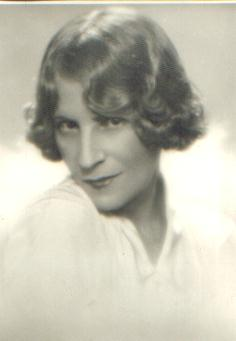
- Born: 30 May 1891; Saint Petersburg, Russian Empire
- Died: 8 September 1967 (aged 76); Kaunas, Lithuanian SSR, Soviet Union

Olga Dubeneckienė also (Schwede-Dubeneckienė, Dubeneckienė-Kalpockienė) (1891–1967) was a Lithuanian and Soviet artist. She was a noted painter, but also worked in a variety of artistic fields. In ballet, she was a dancer, choreographer, and stage designer, and, in 1921,opened the first ballet studio in Lithuania.

Her husband was architect Vladimiras Dubeneckis.

== See also ==
- List of Lithuanian painters
