= Jonas Kaupys =

Lithuanian art restorer

Jonas Kaupys (1941–2000) was a Lithuanian art restorer.

== See also ==
- List of Lithuanian painters
