= Jaronimas Kastytis Juodikaitis =

Lithuanian painter

Jaronimas Kastytis Juodikaitis (February 1, 1932 – April 1, 2000) was a Lithuanian artist of woodcuts, drawings and linocuts. His work is in the Lithuanian National Museum of Art.

== See also ==
- List of Lithuanian painters
- Universal Lithuanian Encyclopedia
