= Henrikas Natalevičius =

Lithuanian painter

Henrikas Natalevičius (born 1953 in Vilnius) is a Lithuanian painter. His works have been displayed in galleries all over Lithuania, in Vilnius, the Lithuanian Art Museum and the National M. K. Čiurlionis Museum of Art in Kaunas.

== See also ==
- List of Lithuanian painters
