= Ramutė Aleksandra Jasudytė =

Lithuanian textile artist (1930–2021)

Ramutė Aleksandra Jasudytė (30 November 1930 – 7 October 2021) was a Lithuanian textile artist.

== Biography ==
Ramutė Aleksandra Jasudytė was born in Kaunas on 30 November 1930. Her sister is Giedrė Konstancija Jasudytė.

From 1952 to 1958, she studied at Vilnius Art Institute, where she studied with Sofija Veiverytė, Juozas Balčikonis. From 1957 to 1970, she worked at the "weaver" factory of artists, and in 1970–1972 she was Lithuanian Film Studio costume designer.

From 1958, she participated exhibitions in Lithuania and abroad (Poland, Romania, Czechoslovakia, Hungary, Bulgaria, Sweden, Finland, Austria, France, Canada, Chile, USA, Italy). Her solo exhibitions were held in Vilnius (1981), Kaunas (1981), Norway (1991). Her works of public interiors in Vilnius and Moscow, Lithuanian Art Museum, the National M. K. Čiurlionis Museum of Art, private "memory." 1993 collections.

Jasudytė died in Švenčionys on 7 October 2021, at the age of 90.

== Works ==
Her thematic, ornamental tapestries (Lietuvaitės "1968," Ships "in 1970, a rug I, II, 1987–1988," Loose "in 1990," surprise "in 1993," Duty "in 1996 – 1997, "Memory I, II, 1995, 2003," Goda "2001–2002," Farewell "2003–2005 Creator tapestries for interiors: series" Brothers "," Gulbelė "," Little Sisters "In 1972–1977, Vilnius University," Autumn in knowledge "of 1978–1979, the palace Tass in Moscow.

== Awards ==
- 1981 Lithuanian State Prize of the Vilnius University, designed the interior monumental tapestries "against the Crusaders" (Triptych, 1972–1978) and "Song of the cycle," Lithuania "(1979–1980)

== See also ==
- List of Lithuanian artists
