= Vitalija Bartkuvienė =

Lithuanian painter

Vitalija Bartkuvienė (27 June 1939 – 29 August 1996) was a Lithuanian painter.

== See also ==
- List of Lithuanian painters
