= Marija Dūdienė =

Lithuanian painter

Marija Dūdienė (13 March 1927–14 October 2012) was a Lithuanian painter.

== See also ==
- List of Lithuanian painters
