= Romas Dalinkevičius =

Lithuanian painter

Romas Dalinkevičius (April 9, 1950, in Kaunas – November 3, 2001, in Vilnius) was a Lithuanian painter.

== Biography ==
He graduated from the Lithuanian Institute of Fine Arts, where his teachers were Veiverytė Sofia, Kazimierz Morkunas and Leopold Surgailis .

Lithuanian Institute of Art (since 1990 at the Vilnius Academy of Fine Arts), lecturer, 1989 - 1993 on ir 1995–2001 m. and 1995 - 2001 of Monumental art department head from 1988 on docentas. Assoc.

== Works ==
Since 1973, he participated in several art exhibitions:

- Vilnius - 1975–1976, 1990, 1993–94, 2000
- USSR - 1985, 1995
- Luxembourg - In 1986–87, 1989
- USA - 1989
- Switzerland - 1991, 1995
- Gallery "Akademija" 2010

== See also ==
- List of Lithuanian painters
- Universal Lithuanian Encyclopedia
