= Dalia Juknevičiūtė =

Lithuanian painter

Dalia Juknevičiūtė (1935–1975) was a Lithuanian painter.

== See also ==
- List of Lithuanian painters
