= Šarūnas Leonavičius =

Lithuanian graphic artist

Šarūnas Leonavičius (born 1960) is a Lithuanian graphic artist. He graduated from the Lithuanian Institute of Fine Arts, in 1985. He works mainly in etching, and copper engraving techniques. His work, on biblical themes in which variations of medieval art grounds, is characterized by skillful, detailed design, unexpected juxtaposition, plot meanders, mystical atmosphere, magical mood.

He has shown in the Lietuvos Aidas Gallery, and Juškus Gallery.

== Works ==
He created prints (Wolf lyžtelėjimas, 1989, "Enkantados", "Untitled," both in 1990, "Leopardena, 1996, Christopher, 1998, "lying" in 2000); postage stamp series ("The old ships in the Baltic" – Kurenkahn, 1997), posters (plays "Knights Karaliūnas", according to Lithuanian folk tales, 1991); illustrated books (Justin Marcinkevicius. "Tree of knowledge", "Donelaitis", both in 1983, Louis Didziuliene wife. "Orphans 'Christmas tree'", 1985, Victor Miliūnas. "Pasakaitės Happy " in 1989, Echo Marčėnas. "Human Star" in 2004) designed in a series of books ("Ad se ipsum ", 1996–1998). In 1990, he created a puppet scenery for Sepoa Theatre.

== See also ==
- List of Lithuanian artists
- Visuotinė lietuvių enciklopedija
- "Šarūnas Leonavičius", Lithuanian Wikipedia
