= Ignas Budrys =

Lithuanian painter

Ignas Budrys (1933, Grigaičiai – 1999) was a Lithuanian painter.

== See also ==
- List of Lithuanian painters
