= Juozas Kaminskas =

Lithuanian painter

Juozas Kaminskas (1898–1957) was a Lithuanian painter.

== See also ==
- List of Lithuanian painters
