= Vaclava Fleri =

Lithuanian painter (1888–1983)

Vaclava Fleri (Polish: Wacława Fleury; c. 1888 – c. 1983) was a Lithuanian painter.

== See also ==
- List of Lithuanian painters
