= Vytautas Janulionis =

Lithuanian glass artist (1958–2010)

Vytautas Janulionis (28 February 1958 – 1 May 2010) was a Lithuanian glass artist. He was born in Klaipėda.

In 1969–1976, he studied at M. K. Čiurlionis secondary art school. He graduated from the Art Institute in Tallinn, in 1981. Since 1981, he taught at Vilnius Academy of Art, Kaunas Art Institute. Since 1988, he was a member of the Lithuanian Artists' Association.

== Works ==
He created distinctive glass and plastic compositions ("Rain" in 1985, "Silent Light" in 2001), indoor public stained glass ("Leaves" company "Sema" in Panevezys in 1988, the Pharmaceutical Museum in Kaunas in 1989, a circus in Tula (Russia), 1991, the Kaunas Regional Archives, 1994, New Apostolic Church in Panevezys, 1999.

Since 1983, he participated in exhibitions in Lithuania and abroad, individual exhibitions held in Kaunas in 1994, 2005, in Vilnius in 2005, an international Kanadzavoje 2001 Works to Lithuanian Art Museum, National Museum of Fine Arts Čiurlionis.

== See also ==
- List of Lithuanian painters
