= Raminta Elena Kuprevičienė =

Lithuanian paper restorer

Raminta Elena Kuprevičienė (born 1 November 1938 Vilnius) is a Lithuanian paper restorer.

In 1941, her family was exiled to the Altai Territory, but in 1947 she returned to Lithuania. In 1963, she graduated from Vilnius University in geography. In 1963–1969, she worked with hydrogeological expeditions, and in 1969–1973 at Vilnius University Library as a restorer. Since 1973, she worked as a restorer at the Lithuanian Art Museum, P. Gudynas Restoration Center Graphics Department. In 1974, she was trained by J. Grabar Restoration Center in Moscow. In 1986, she was given the highest category of graphic works for restorers.

Among her most significant restorations are works of Čiurlionis, paintings of Petras Kalpokas, and watercolors of Juozas Kamarauskas. She provided support to Michailas Raškovskis for his exhibition at the Louvre.

== See also ==
- List of Lithuanian artists
- Visuotinė lietuvių enciklopedija
