= Irena Trečiokaitė-Žebenkienė =

Lithuanian painter (1909–1985)

Irena Trečiokaitė-Žebenkienė (28 October 1909, in Biržai – 13 January 1985, in Vilnius) was a Soviet and Lithuanian painter.

== Biography ==
In 1928, she finished high school. In 1928–1932, she studied law at Vytautas Magnus University. In 1935, she graduated from Kaunas Art School. In 1934, she joined the illegal Communist Party of Lithuania and was briefly jailed. In 1944, she graduated from Vilnius Academy of Arts.

Beginning in 1944, she taught at the Vilnius Institute of Fine Arts. In 1947, she became a docent. In 1948–1951, she was the head of the Drawing Department. In 1951–1969, she taught decorative painting in the Department of Painting.

In 1949, 1959, 1964 and 1979, she had solo exhibitions in Vilnius.

== Awards ==
- 1959: Honored Art Worker of the Lithuanian SSR
- 1979: People's Artist of the Lithuanian SSR

== Works ==
- Portraits (Juozas Baltušis in 1949, Vincas Mickevičius-Kapsukas in 1955, Lėja Aleksandravičiūtė in 1959)
- Landscapes, historical compositions, created a mosaic (Lietuvaitė in 1946, Vladimir Lenin in 1965)
- Fresco, graphic works (Cars in 1934, Washing Floors in Prison, Hotel, Salome in 1934–1939, posters in 1940–1941, book illustrations, bookplates)

== See also ==
- List of Lithuanian artists
