= Lidija Meškaitytė =

Lithuanian painter

Lidija Meškaitytė (1926–1993) was a Lithuanian painter.

== See also ==
- List of Lithuanian painters
