= Inga Likšaitė =

Lithuanian textile artist

Inga Likšaitė (born 26 June 1972 in Kaunas) is a Lithuanian artist who often works with embroidery techniques.

== See also ==
- List of Lithuanian artists
