= Jonas Arčikauskas =

Lithuanian ceramic artist, and set designer

Jonas Arčikauskas (born 1957 in Patilčiai) is a Lithuanian ceramic artist, and set designer.

== Life ==
He studied at the Art Institute in Vilnius (1980–85) in ceramics and theatre set design. He was invited to work in the Kaunas Drama Theatre as a set designer (1985). Since 1984, he participated in exhibitions, since 1990 is a member of the group “Angis”. He teaches in the Chair of Ceramics of the Vilnius Art Academy. In 2009, he was a McKnight Fellow.

== Set design ==
- The River (1989)
- Caligula (1989)
- The City-Stick (1992)
- Love’s Labour Lost (1996)
- A Doll’s House (1996)
- The Seagull (2001)
- Andre Chenier (1999)
- Salome (1997)
- Golgotha, A Dream (1995)
- The Marriage of Figaro, 1999
- Jeanne d’Arc at the Stake (1998)
- A Christmas Tree at the Ivanovs' (Stockholm, 1997)

== See also ==
- List of Lithuanian painters
