= Aldona Ličkutė-Jusionienė =

Lithuanian painter

Aldona Ličkutė-Jusionienė (13 February 1928 – 9 August 2007) was a Lithuanian painter.

== See also ==
- List of Lithuanian painters
