= Feliksas Jakubauskas =

Lithuanian textile artist (1949–2025)

- Born: 14 October 1949
- Died: 28 July 2025 (aged 75)
- Education: Lithuanian Institute of Art; Moholy-Nagy University of Art and Design

Feliksas Jakubauskas (14 October 1949 – 28 July 2025) was a Lithuanian textile artist.

== Biography ==
From 1974 to 1976, he studied textiles at the Lithuanian Institute of Art, and from 1976 to 1980 at Moholy-Nagy University of Art and Design. From 1981 to 1989, he worked as an artist at the individual designer clothing factory "Daisy" in Vilnius.

Jakubauskas died on 28 July 2025, at the age of 75.

== Major works ==
- Glass beads game, 1985
- Above the valley of my black cloud, 1987
- Old cloth, 1987
- Butterfly mm fan, the World Bank, Washington, 1992
- Rain in a sunny meadow, 1995
- Touch the gray cloud, 1997
- Day night, 2004
- Raw nocturne, Triptych, 2000
- The sky is black - green sky, Triptych, 2002
- Golden Baroque Vilnius, Diptych, 2003–2004,
- The two worlds of Matthew, diptych, 2004

Since 1980, he has shown in more than 170 exhibitions in Lithuania and abroad.

== Individual exhibitions ==
- Bergen – 1991
- Vilnius – 1992, 1995–1997, 1999, 2001, 2005
- Kaunas – 1998, 1999, 2003, 2010
- Nida, Moscow – 1999
- Lodz, Poland – 2001
- Kedainiai – 2004

His works to Lithuanian Art Museum, the Lithuanian National Museum, National Museum of Fine Arts Čiurlionis

== Awards ==
- 1997 – International Biennial, Pittsburgh, Ohio - Grand Prix
- 1998 – Lithuanian National Prize
- 1998 – International Textile Triennial, Lodz, Poland - silver medal
- 2003 – Cheongju International Craft Biennale, Korea - Gold Dragon statue

== See also ==
- List of Lithuanian painters
