= Eugenijus Mindaugas Budrys =

Lithuanian painter

Eugenijus Mindaugas Budrys (1925–2007) was a Lithuanian painter. He has created landscapes, still lifes, figurative and abstract compositions (No. 2, Meeting), and wall paintings for the interiors of public buildings in Stockholm, Herns, Visby, Vasteras and other Swedish cities.

== See also ==
- List of Lithuanian painters
