= Laimutis Ločeris =

Lithuanian monumentalist painter and graphic artist

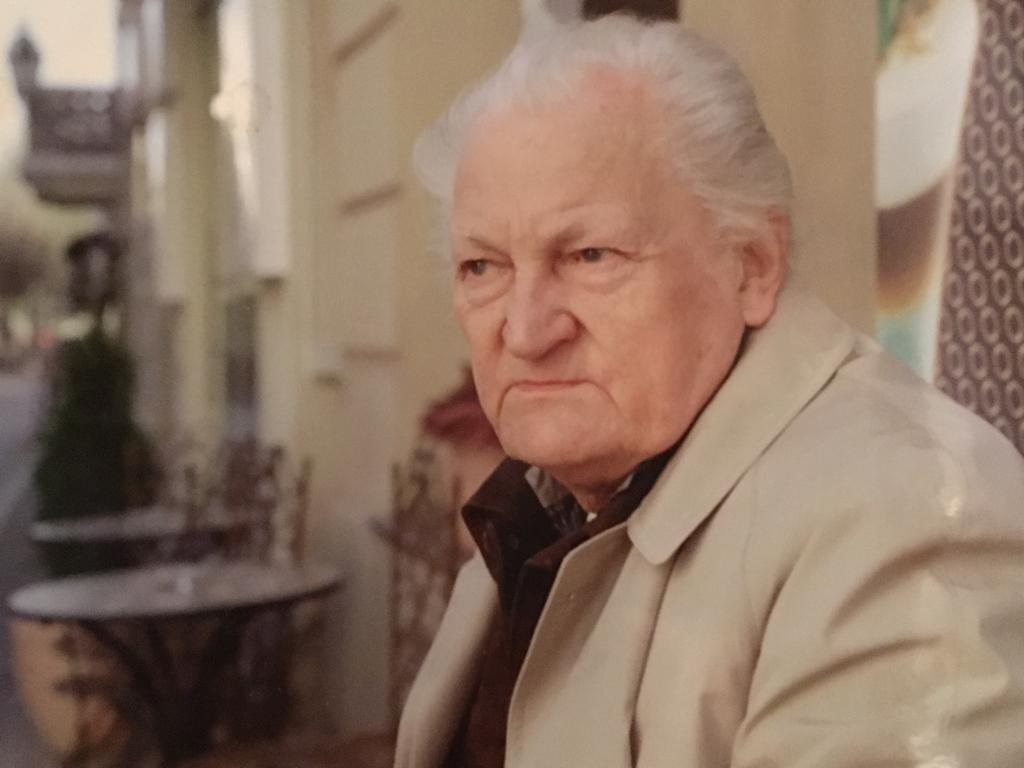
Laimutis Ločeris in Vilnius Old Town.

Laimutis Ločeris (11 April 1929-13 November 2018) was a Lithuanian monumentalist painter and graphic artist.

In 1952, he graduated from the Lithuanian Institute of Fine Arts and in 1958, from the Leningrad Academy of Fine Arts.

From 1987-1990, he lived in Canada, where he worked different jobs unrelated to his profession. From 1990 to 2006, he taught painting at the Academy of Fine Arts in Vilnius.

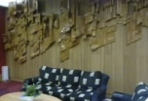
Age Vilnius in Hotel Neringa by Laimutis Ločeris

Since 1960, he participated in exhibitions and created monumental works of decorative interiors, such as Age Vilnius (Hotel Neringa, 1959), Hunt Cup (cafe "Bull" in 1961, both in Vilnius), Dainava party (cafe Dainava Druskininkai, 1965), and ornamental gates (world exhibition EXPO 70, Osaka), etc.

In his artwork he regularly used materials such as metal, concrete, and wood. He has also illustrated several books and for the Canadian Lithuanian weekly "Homeland Lights" between 1987 and 2005 years.

== See also ==
- List of Lithuanian painters
