= Viktorija Daniliauskaitė =

Lithuanian printmaker and book illustrator

Benjamin Franklin Greene
- Born: November 18, 1817; Providence, Rhode Island, United States
- Died: October 17, 1895 (aged 77)
- Occupations: Engineer; educator
- Employer: Rensselaer Polytechnic Institute
- Known for: Director of the Rensselaer Polytechnic Institute

Viktorija Daniliauskaitė (born 23 April 1951 in Yakutsk, Russia) is a Lithuanian printmaker, and book illustrator.

She studied at Vilnius Academy of Arts from 1968 to 1974. Since 1983, she is a member of Lithuanian Artists' Association.

Her work is in the collection of The Lithuanian Art Museum. Vilnius, M. K. Čiurlionis Art Museum. Kaunas, M. K. Čiurlionis Art Gallery. Chicago, and Lithuanian Museum of Art.

== Awards ==
- Prize from the Lithuanian Ministry of Culture. Vilnius, 1989.
- Diploma in XXVI Baltic State book art competition. Vilnius, 1994.
- First prize in the International Bookplate Competition "Lietuviškai knygai – 450". Vilnius, 1997.

== Illustrated books ==
- 1986 m. Jonas Strielkūnas, Rinktinė, Vilnius. 1986 John Locomotive, team, Vilnius.
- 1990–1992 m. One thousand nine hundred and ninety of -1992 Tremties archyvas" (žurnalo „Metai“ biblioteka, Nr. 1, 2, 3, 5, 6), Vilnius. Exile Archive "(the magazine" The Year of the Library, no. 1, 2, 3, 5, 6), Vilnius.
- 1992 m. 1992 Kryžius Šiaurėje, Vilnius. Cross the north, Vilnius.
- 1993 m. Vytautas Mačernis, Sielos paveikslas, Vilnius. 1993 of Vytautas Mačernis, soul painting, Vilnius.
- 1993 m. 1993 Jonas Strielkūnas, Trečias brolis, Vilnius. John Locomotive, third brother, Vilnius.
- 1994 m. Antanas Kalanavičius, Ne akmenys guli, Vilnius. 1994 in Anton Kalanavičius, no stones, Vilnius.
- 1997 m. Gintaras Grajauskas, Katalogas 1997 The Amber Grajauskas, Products
- 1999 m. 1999 on Elgetaujanti saulė Elgetaujanti sun
- 2002 m. 2002 on Naktiniai sodai Night Garden

== Individual exhibitions ==
- 1981, 1983 m. 1981, 1983 Lietuvos dailininkų sąjungos salonas, Vilnius. Lithuanian Artists' Salon, Vilnius.
- 1988 m. 1988 on Lietuvos menininkų rūmai, Vilnius. Lithuanian Artists' House, Vilnius.
- 1989 m. 1989 on Gallery Siverts, Bergenas, Norvegija. Gallery Siewert, Bergen, Norway.
- 1991, 1995 m. 1991, 1995 Dailės parodų rūmai, Klaipėda. Fine Arts Exhibition Hall, Klaipeda, Lithuania.
- 1992, 1996 m. 1992, 1996, the Lietuvos muziejus, Lemontas, JAV. Lithuanian Museum, Lemont, USA.
- 1992 m. 1992 Šiuolaikinio meno centras, Vilnius. Contemporary Art Centre, Vilnius.
- 1992 m. 1992 Medalių galerija, Vilnius. Medal Gallery, Vilnius.
- 1994 m. 1994 Galerija „Lietuvos Aidas“, Vilnius. Gallery Echo of Lithuania, Vilnius.
- 1994 m. 1994 Auksakalių galerija, Vilnius. Goldsmiths Gallery, Vilnius.
- 1995 m. 1995 Ekslibrisų paroda, Vilnius, Medicinos biblioteka. Bookplate exhibition in Vilnius, the Medical Library.
- 1996 m. 1996 Piešinių paroda: Giedraičių tėvonijai 630. Drawing Exhibition: Giedraičių patrimony 630th Vilniaus universitetas, Molėtų kultūros namai. University, Moletai House of Culture.

== See also ==
- List of Lithuanian painters
