= Boleslovas Klova =

Lithuanian painter

Boleslovas Klova (1927–1986) was a Lithuanian painter.

== See also ==
- List of Lithuanian painters
