= Kazimieras Naruševičius =

Lithuanian painter

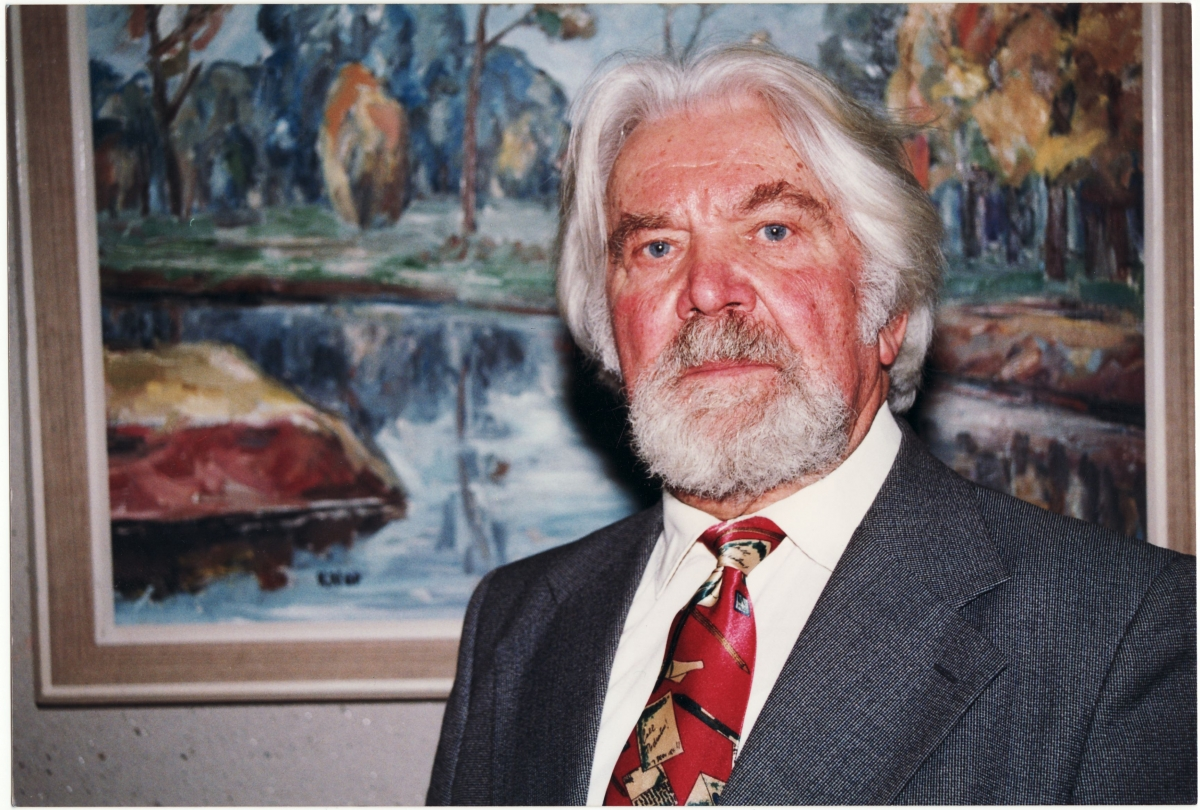
Image of Kazimieras Naruševičius

Kazys Naruševičius, or Kazimieras Naruševičius (2 March 1920 – 12 October 2004), was a Lithuanian painter, artist, and teacher. He was notable for his position as a well-known representative of professional art and teacher in Panevėžys, Lithuania, before the country declared independence from the Soviet Union in 1990.

== Biography ==
K. Naruševičius was born into a family of Jurgis Naruševičius and Adela Valantonytė in Dūdonys village. He attended Rėkliai Primary School at the age of seven in 1927 before graduating from the school in 1932. He also studied at the Panevėžys State Boys’ Gymnasium from 1938 to 1940. Furthermore, he was an active participant in activities organized by a Catholic youth organization in Lithuania known as Ateitis, or future, sang in choir led by Mykolas Karka, and was a member of the student library group "Meno kuopa". His teacher and artist Povilas Puzinas had encouraged him in art which resulted in him drawing more frequently.

== See also ==
- List of Lithuanian painters
