= Vladas Jankauskas (painter) =

Lithuanian painter (1923–1983)

Vladas Jankauskas (1923–1983) was a Lithuanian painter.

== See also ==
- List of Lithuanian painters
