= Vigintas Stankus =

- Born: July 14, 1962 (age 63); Kaunas
- Occupations: Artist, painter

Vigintas Stankus is an artist who is mainly famous as an oil painter. Stankus was born on July 14, 1962, in Kaunas, Lithuania. 1991 graduated from Lithuania Academy of Arts. Vigintas is a member of Lithuanian Artists' Association since 1999. Participant of exhibitions since 1991. Works in sphere of painting. Vigintas Stankus made more than 60 personal and group exhibitions in Lithuania and abroad (Germany, USA, Spain, Norway, Netherlands etc.)

== Creative work credo ==
Positive thoughts and emotions reflect in each work, also in painting. Admires Japanese painting. Big influence of east philosophy.
