= Petronėlė Gerlikienė =

Lithuanian artist (1905–1979)

Petronėlė Gerlikienė, née Kromelyte (June 19, 1905, Chicago, United States – March 14, 1979, Vilnius, Lithuania), was a Lithuanian painter and textile folk artist. She lived and worked in a farm in Samogitia; after retiring, she moved to Vilnius to live with her son's family. Gerlikienė began creating large-scale tapestries in 1972, paintings in 1976 and began participating in exhibitions in 1974. Petronėlė Gerlikienė's art has won recognition and numerous prizes in Lithuania and abroad.

== Life and works ==
Petronėlė Gerlikienė entered the Lithuanian art scene at quite a venerable age after she retired and was living with her son's family in Vilnius. She started embroidering tapestries of a very large scale; to make them she used different techniques such as embroidery and application. She was fascinated with big trees and used it as a motif for her first tapestries An Oak, A Rowan, A Maple Tree and A Red Tree.

About her textile artwork, Man and Woman Petronėlė said:

“I need to have a very translucent yellow background in order to embroider Paradise. Paradise is above the houses and only the thin branches of trees covered in blossoms and fruit support Adam and Eve. Adam is naked and worry-free. His soft and relaxed body, with clearly marked Adam's apple, seems to sway weightlessly in the air. With his hands on the stomach, he moves his toes enjoying Paradise. Eve by his side is interpreted very differently, as a contrast to Adam, she is full of anxiety: Her skirt is so bouffant ... The woman must always be more beautiful than the man. She holds a bouquet of forget-me-nots.” Eve's body is tense, she is focused and ready--she knows what awaits her". ("Petronėlė Gerlikienė", LTS, 2005, p. 53.)

She was encouraged by her daughter-in-law, who brought pieces of cardboard and paint from her son's (professional painter) studio. Petronele was amazed that she could paint so quickly and effortlessly. She always had a clearly formed idea of the painting, its composition, and combinations of colours in her head. She painted fast, hurrying as if in oblivion, without sketches, dabbing paint directly from the tube, mixing the colours right on the cardboard or canvas. First, with a dry brush, with its stem (“why stroke and daub needlessly”), Petronele would outline the place of the main character. She only used a palette for putting paint tubes on it. Like this, in one fell swoop, she created her first painting, Under the Maple, Under the Green One…: “This is after the song “under the maple, under the green one, there's a young lad lying…” and, of course, a young girl is handing her heart to him. The girl's heart is always bigger than the boy's."

The very next day she demanded a large piece of cardboard – she intended to draw The Ship – Noah's Ark. Petronele outlined a big oval – the ship and began placing people aboard. First of all, she drew Noah and his seven daughters, then animals and birds, a couple of each. Noah and his daughters are rowing. Noah often turns and watches his eldest daughter in the stern, because his wife is very old and she only sits by the chest with her cane. "In this way, the human race has survived..."

Petronėlė Gerlikienė's works, The Sorrowful One, A Mother, The Virgin, and Benefaction are considered broad-brush works and poignant.

Many consider that her works also have a diversity of colours, composition, and a sense of wholeness.

Petronele's world is dominated by people. Figures are often depicted in motion and communicating with each other and the beholder. Her creative world encompasses whole human life with all its aspects, but most important subjects are woman's fate and man's and woman's relationship. These “eternal” subjects interpreted with understanding and humour, men are often ridiculed like in the picture Picking Cherries: calm, smiling woman pulls a man by the hand into a lake. “If a man is afraid, he can grab hold of a calf's tail out of fear.” Petronele loved to paint piquant situations, love dramas and psychologically complicated situations. She was positive that she was portraying everything lifelike. "Petronele Gerlikiene", LTS, 2005

Petronele Gerlikiene was illiterate. As a child, she did not have the opportunity to attend school; later, she stated that she did not consider it necessary. Over a seven-year period, Petronele produced 11 large-scale tapestries and more than 60 paintings.

== Prizes and awards ==
- 1977 Winner of the 1st prize for paintings and textile artwork, A National Exhibition of Folk Art, Vilnius Exhibition Palace, Vilnius, Lithuania.
- 1977 Winner of the 2nd prize, An Exhibition of Folk Painters and Craftsmen of the Soviet Union, Moscow.

== Most Famous Artwork ==
- Picking Cherries, 1977
- A Difficult Year, 1977
- A Mother, 1978
- Tapestry The Song Festival, 1976
- Tapestry Sweep the Yard on a Saturday..., 1976
- Tapestry A Red Tree, 1977
- The Sorrowful One, 1978

== Sources and publications ==
"Petronele Gerlikiene". LTS, 2005.
Compilers: Jurgita Gerlikaite and Darijus Gerlikas. Text: Jurgita Gerlikaite.
Biography, album; hardcover, bilingual (Lithuanian, English) ISBN 9986-9189-6-0

Gerlikiene, P., // World Encyclopedia of Naive Art, 1985, p. 267, 289.

== P. Gerlikiene's artwork in Museum Collections ==
Modern Art Center (MAC)
M. K. Čiurlionis National Museum of Art
Lithuanian Art Museum
