= Viktorija Karatajūtė-Šarauskienė =

Lithuanian ceramic artist (1948–2007)

- Born: 12 December 1948; Vilnius, Lithuanian SSR, Soviet Union
- Died: 2007 (aged 58–59)
- Education: Lithuanian Institute of Fine Arts
- Known for: Ceramics
- Style: Ceramic artist

Viktorija Karatajūtė-Šarauskienė (12 December 1948 Vilnius – 2007) was a Lithuanian ceramic artist.

== Biography ==
In 1971, she graduated from the Lithuanian Institute of Fine Arts. In 1971–1996, she was a Vilnius Painting Factory artist.

== Works ==
Creator of ornamental panels (Vilnius Antokolskio home interiors and exteriors, 1995–1996, all with the designer's brother R. Karatajus), decorative compositions ("Welcome" in 1974, "Mood" in 1980, festive decorations 1983, "Butterfly Festival" in 1998), installations (Spring 2002). Conceptual works, associative, poetic, bright colors, often conveys the mood of nature motifs. Clay and porcelain compositions in combination with different materials.

From 1972, she participated in exhibitions, individual exhibitions held in Vilnius and Kaunas in 1986, with V. Karatajus in Vilnius in 1994, 1998. The presence of the international symposia on ceramics in Lithuania and abroad. Her works are to Lithuanian Art Museum, National Museum of Fine Arts Čiurlionis. She showed at lietuvos galerija.

== See also ==
- List of Lithuanian artists
