= Osvaldas Jablonskis =

Lithuanian painter (1944–2026)

Osvaldas Jablonskis (2 July 1944 – 14 January 2026) was a Lithuanian painter. He died on 14 January 2026, at the age of 81.

== See also ==
- List of Lithuanian artists
