= Ona Danutė Buivydaitė =

Lithuanian artist (born 1947)

Ona Danutė Buivydaitė (born August 25, 1947) is a Lithuanian artist and designer.

== See also ==
- List of Lithuanian artists
