= Ramunė Kmieliauskaitė =

Lithuanian graphic artist and watercolor painter (1960–2020)

Ramunė Aldona Kmieliauskaitė (22 June 1960 in Vilnius – 13 May 2020 in Vilnius) was a Lithuanian graphic artist and watercolor painter. In 1984 she graduated from Vilnius Academy of Art and began appearing in exhibitions. Her work was influenced by ancient Chinese and Japanese art, by impressionist and Post-Impressionist movements. Her works combine cold and warm colors, free composition, and floral motifs.

== See also ==
- List of Lithuanian painters
