= Violeta Laužonytė =

Lithuanian textile artist

Violeta Laužonytė (born 20 November 1955 Vilnius) is a Lithuanian textile artist.

== Biography ==
In 1978, she graduated from the Pedagogical Institute. Since 1978, she taught at J. Vienožinskis art school in Vilnius.

== Works ==
Which abstract, Pictorial tapestry ("Between the two waters" in 1998, "27 drops in Beijing 2002", "The river runs low in 2003," Underwater Melody "2005," Route "in 2006), small textiles (thumbnail series "Journey" in 2005), conceptual spatial compositions ("Grey Cardinal" in 2005), objects, was on the silk embroidery. Traditional weaving techniques peculiar interpretation of the complement relief, application, characterized by unexpected combinations of materials.

Since 1980, she participated in exhibitions in Lithuania, and abroad (in the Baltic States, Western Europe, Russia, China, Mongolia, Mexico, USA), and individual exhibitions held in Vilnius (1988, 2000, 2002, 2004–2005), Kaunas (1999, 2001, 2003). She shows at the Balta Gallerija, and Kauno Bienale 2009.

Her works are in the Lithuanian Art Museum, the National Čiurlionis Museum of Art, National Museum of Lithuania.

== See also ==
- List of Lithuanian painters
