= Ona Kreivytė-Naruševičienė =

Lithuanian ceramic artist (1935–2024)

Ona Kreivytė-Naruševičienė (31 October 1935 – 21 May 2024) was a Lithuanian ceramic artist.

== Biography ==
Her sister is Zita Kreivytė. In 1961, she graduated from the Lithuanian Institute of Fine Arts. From 1960 to 1974, she worked at the House of Folk Art, 1974–1994, the Vilnius Art "WORKS, 1994–1995, company "Vilnius Art" artist.

Kreivytė-Naruševičienė died on 21 May 2024, at the age of 88.

== Works ==
Creator plot ceramic sculptures in the form of small village of fishermen living subject ("Fishermen", 1973, "the potter's family," 1977), monumental works of decorative plastic exterior ("crucified" I-III, 1972), parks, abstract expressive silhouette Song ("Fire of Life" 1976, "Autumn" 1978, "Memories of Italy" in 1979, "Life Rafts" in 1988), spatial compositions ("Childhood Clouds" in 1985), vases, plates.

Kreivytė-Naruševičienė created panels of decorative ceramics in public and private interiors of Vilnius (Old Town, New Town, Vilnius Airport, in 1997, with her husband and son, J. and R. Naruševičius) and other cities.

Her works stylized, in aggregate form, restrained earth colors, they highlight the šamotinio clay material and texture. Since 1961 she had participated in exhibitions in Lithuania and abroad (Faenza, Valauris, Sopot), they earned diplomas.

Her individual exhibitions were held in Vilnius in 1974, 1985, 1997, 2006, Kaunas, 2000 Works to Lithuanian Art Museum, the Lithuanian National Museum, National Museum of Fine Arts Čiurlionis.

== See also ==
- List of Lithuanian painters
