= Jolanta Kvašytė =

Lithuanian ceramic artist

Jolanta Kvašytė (born 29 May 1956 in Vilnius) is a Lithuanian ceramic artist.

In 1982, she graduated from the Lithuanian Institute of Fine Arts. In 1982–1984, she worked in a factory "Jiesia" Kybartu shop, in 1985-1988 Restoration Trust in Vilnius. In 2003, she was resident artist at the University of Akron. She showed at the Klaipėda Baroti gallery, and The Ceramics Museum, Kaunas.

== Works ==
Which mostly Thematic compositions ("Stations of the Cross" 1992, "City" in 1995, "Bethlehem" in 1996, "the ship" in 1997), sculptor to the small plastic ("Autumn bugs" in 1990 " St. John's Night "1991," Love Cats "in 1994," Adam and Eve "in 2004, Saba Queen" in 2006). Creator works in interior (plate "glass" in 1993, "Zodiac," "mechanical dolls", both in 1994–1995, all "glass" in the hotel and restaurant), garden pottery ("Pyramid" in the square in Panevezys, 1998), servizi ("pagoda" in 1991), vases (Turkish bathing "in 1999). Recently created monumentalesnių more generalized mosaic sculpture compositions: "Ophelia" (2000), "New York Code" (2004), "The Kiss" (2006).

Works combine clay, porcelain, black pottery, and other materials, including beads, stones, and feathers. Religious and secular themes are interpreted freely. Recurring characteristics identified in the work include narrative content, theatricality, dramatic staging, the grotesque, irony, and caricature, as well as the use of metaphor and allegory. The works are decorative, employ color, and incorporate ornamentation.

Since 1983, she participated in exhibitions, in international Pottery and Porcelain symposia in Lithuania and abroad (in Latvia, Poland, Czech Republic, Great Britain, the USA).

== Solo shows ==
- Vilnius – 1990–1995, 1997, 1998, 2000, 2003, 2005, 2006
- Klaipėda – 1992
- Oslas – 1991, 1992
- Akronas – 2003
- Helsinkis – 2004

== See also ==
- List of Lithuanian painters
