= Marija Mačiulienė =

Lithuanian painter (born 1929)

Marija Mačiulienė (born 1929 in Kaunas) is a Lithuanian painter.

His 1962 mosaic is featured at the entrance to Druskininkai's Sveikatingumo Park.

== See also ==
- List of Lithuanian painters
