= Albertas Gurskas =

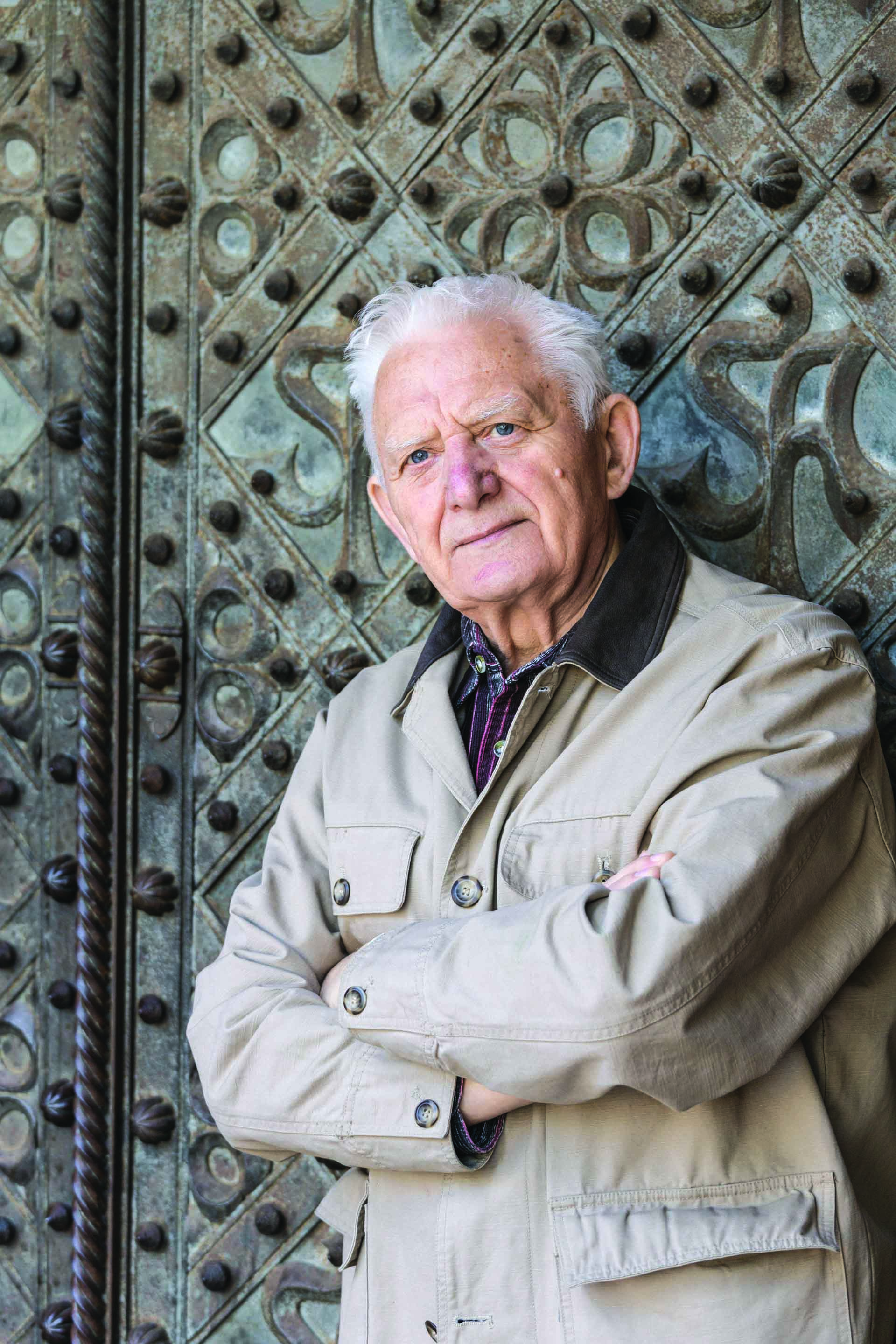
Albertas Gurskas

Albertas Gurskas (born January 20, 1935) is a Lithuanian calligrapher, graphic artist, and professor, founder of the Lithuanian School of Calligraphy. He is a notable designer of coins in Lithuania.

== Biography ==
Gurskas was born in the village of Gintarai, in Ukmergė District Municipality, Vilnius County. He was trained in the graphic arts under the likes of Antanas Kučas, Jonas Kuzminskis, Juozas Galkus, Leonas Lagauskas and P. Aleksandravičius.

From 1966 to 1969, he worked at the National Land Survey Design Institute as an engineer-artist. Between 1969 and 2003 he has worked at the Graphics Department of the Vilnius Academy of Arts, and was professor from 1993. Since 1989 he has been involved with the Bank of Lithuania's design and manufacturing expert commission and designing some 40 commemorative coins. He is also a designer of logotypes, posters, postcards, and books in Lithuania. In 2006 he authored a book on calligraphy, Basics of calligraphy and script.

Gurskas has been a member of the Lithuanian–Czech Society since its inception in 1993, and since 2013 has been Chairman of the Society. He has been a member of the Lithuanian Artists' Association since 1970. Gurskas is also a member of the National Heraldry Committee.
