= Romualdas Lankauskas =

Lithuanian artist (1932–2020)

Romualdas Lankauskas (3 April 1932 – 4 February 2020) was a Lithuanian writer, playwright and painter.

== Biography ==
Lankauskas was born in Klaipėda. In 1950–1953, he studied Russian languages and literature at Vilnius University. In 1952–1953, and in 1959–1960, 1973 he worked as an editor, in 1978–1979 he was a Painter decorator. In 1989, he managed the Lithuanian PEN Centre. He died in Vilnius, aged 87.

== Works ==
In the early period, he wrote short story books for children. In Lithuanian prose, he created a model of a short story and supplemented it with urban and intelligent themes. Ethical psychological issues prevail in the creative work, and the style is laconic. In Lithuanian prose, he has created a new type of intelligentsia: he is educated, has a distinctive lifestyle, and thus opposes model communication and the spirit of collectivism. The characters endure a conflict between the poetic nature and the urbanity and routine of the environment. In the 20th century, (the 1960s), he applied a restrained manner of storytelling, symmetry of composition, defaults, pauses, and subtext to a Lithuanian novel. The double plot of his best short stories is ironic denial of the Soviet order and the character's internal autonomy. The theme of East Prussia is addressed in the story "Wandering Sand" in the trilogy "Destiny Zone". The pioneering novel "In the Middle of the Field ..." tells the story of Lithuanians fighting on the opposite sides of World War II, the novel "That Cold Winter", Reflections on the Mirror of the Sea, the distraction of the creator, and the project. The Cursed City is a satirical allegory of a totalitarian order, and the novel Pilgrim reveals the ambitious artist's situation after independence. During the Soviet occupation, some novels were heavily criticized and formally condemned. He wrote novels about Lithuanian partisans.

He translated Hemingway, Ray Bradbury works. He painted (since 1961), landscapes, abstract compositions, organized several exhibitions in Lithuania and abroad, the formats of their books. His works translated into 10 languages of the peoples of Europe.

== Publication ==
- "The Uninvited Guest", Translator M.G. Slavėnas, LITHUANIAN QUARTERLY JOURNAL OF ARTS AND SCIENCES, Volume 43, No. 3 – Fall 1997
- "HUMAN RIGHTS, NATIONAL MINORITIES, AND THE KREMLIN'S COLONIALISM", LITHUANIAN QUARTERLY JOURNAL OF ARTS AND SCIENCES, Volume 42, No.2 – Summer 1996

== Bibliography ==
- Emergency, Children, 1954
- Long Distance, Children, 1954, film " Blue Horizon " 1957, dir. Vytautas Mikalauskas
- Scary Robber Aloyz, Children, 1958
- Wandering Sand, Novelties, 1960
- When the Trumpet Mutes, Novels 1961
- In the Middle of the Big Field..., Novel, State Fiction Publishing House, 1962, Vaga Publishers, 1984
- Bridge to the Sea, novel, 1963
- Third Shadow, Novels, 1964
- From Morning to Evening, Novel, Vaga, 1965
- Wandering sand; Cruel Games; White, Black and Blue, Vaga, 1967
- Gray Light, short stories, Vaga, 1968
- Nordic stained glass, short stories, Vaga, 1970
- Carriage of Jazz, short story, Vaga, 1971
- That Cold Winter, Novel, Reflections of the Mirror of the Sea, short story (both in one book), 1972
- Ghost, short story, Vaga, 1974
- The Hour of Unexpected Reality, Novel, Vaga, 1975
- Moment and Eternity, short stories, Vaga, 1976
- Reminiscences After Midnight, Novel, Wagga, 1977
- One more day, 1982, Wagga
- The Dark Windows of Oblivion, short story, 1983
- Project, novel, Vaga, 1986
- Cursed Town, Novel, Wagga, 1988
- Tokyo Cycads: Memories of One Trip, 1989
- No one was sorry, novel, Vaga, 1990, UNO, 1991
- Europe, what is it? Travel Book, 1994
- Pilgrim, Novel, The Radius, 1995
- Romantic Evening by the Calm Sea, short story 1996
- Destiny Zone, trilogy, 1998
- Only echoes among the forests, 1999
- Outing before dusk. Burner, novel, Tyto alba, 2002 ISBN 9986-16-242-4
- Nobody Listens to the Drummer, Novel, 2004
- The lion's deliverance. Story of the Lion Zenon, Hometown, 2005
- Bubu superstar, satirical novel, Wagga, 2007 ISBN 978-5-415-01955-7

== Theater ==
- It all ends today, 1967
- Guests arrive before a thunderstorm, or Cloves Biscuits, past. 1985

== See also ==
- List of Lithuanian artists
- Visuotinė lietuvių enciklopedija
