= Zita Kreivytė =

Lithuanian fashion designer and artist

Zita Kreivytė (born 2 August 1942 Jovaišai, Deltuvos district) is a Lithuanian fashion designer, and artist.

In 1971, she graduated from the Art Institute in Tallinn, Estonia. Since 1971, Vilnius Art factory since 1994, company "Vilnius Art" artist, in 1974–1995 Leather goods shop manager.

She worked in bookbinding ("Future Vision I, II and III" in 1998, "Čiurlionis" 1999, "Bronius Kutavičius", Lithuania Medal both in 2000, "Valentine Editors in 2003, "The best thing in the world" in 2005). She created panels ("Pilgrim Journey" in 2000), three-dimensional objects (Torsas I-II in 2001, "Desert poppy", "ice flowers", both 2002), the original design of constructive sleek box of mirrors.

She uses a variety of techniques: modeling patterns, braid, burning, shading, gilding, silver-plated. Minimal skin colors coordinate with wood, metal. Realization of multi-purpose skin models artistic standards, albums, guest books, folders, boxes, desk sets, notebooks, wallets, clothing accessories. Since 1972, she participated in exhibitions in Lithuania and abroad, individual exhibitions held in Vilnius in 2002, with D. Mieželaityte, and in 2004 Works to Lithuanian Art Museum, the Lithuanian National Museum. She showed at Applied Art Gallery, and Lithuanian Artists' Association.

== See also ==
- List of Lithuanian artists
