= Marija Bankauskaitė =

Lithuanian ceramics artist

Marija Bankauskaitė (19 April 1933 – 7 January 1992 Vilnius) was a Lithuanian ceramics artist.

== Biography ==
In 1955–1961, she studied at the Lithuanian Institute of Art. In 1961–1965, she taught at the Tent, and in 1965–1968, at the Kaunas Stepas Zukas arts college. In 1968–1972 and 1979–1980 on sock factory "Sparta", in 1980–1992 "Art" ceramics workshop in Vilnius factory artist.

== Works ==
Creator decorative box (vase series "The Drops", 1973) and interior (Diptych "Friendship", 1970, Vilnius, "Friendship" hotel), ceramics, dish sets, jewelry. Cone, sphere or drop the form of associative forms of vases similar to the sculptures, the most žiestos with lipdytomis details at the top of the dish. Substrate's natural tones reminiscent mat tone glazes, blurry shades of pigments and waxes.

Since 1962, he participated in exhibitions: in 1983 he held an individual exhibition in Vilnius. His works are in the collection of the Lithuanian Art Museum, and the National Čiurlionis Museum of Art.

== Shows ==
- 1970 International exhibition of ceramic vases gold medal in the diptych "Sword", Faenza, Italy
- 1976 International Ceramics Biennial award for the diptych "Sea Animals" in 1973, Valorisas, France,

== See also ==
- List of Lithuanian painters
