= Lilija Eugenija Jasiūnaitė =

Lithuanian painter

Lilija Eugenija Jasiūnaitė (born 1944 in Panevėžys) is a Lithuanian painter and textile artist. Her work has been shown at exhibitions in Lithuania, Russia, Sweden, and Germany.

== See also ==
- List of Lithuanian painters
