= Rimantas Šulskis =

Lithuanian sculptor and painter

Rimantas Šulskis (1943–1995) was a Lithuanian sculptor and painter from Kaunas.

== See also ==
- List of Lithuanian painters
