= Elvyra Katalina Kriaučiūnaitė =

Argentine-born Lithuanian graphic artist

Elvyra Katalina Kriaučiūnaitė (born 1942) is an Argentine born Lithuanian graphic artist. Born in Buenos Aires, she moved to Lithuania in 1956, and graduated from the Lithuanian Art Institute in 1968.

Since 1969 she has participated in exhibitions in Lithuania and abroad, held about 30 solo exhibitions. She has won awards in Lithuania and abroad. Her works on are display in the Lithuanian Art Museum, National Museum of Fine Arts Čiurlionis, Čiurlionis Art Gallery in Chicago, A. Tretyakov Gallery in Moscow, and other foreign museums.

== See also ==
- List of Lithuanian painters
