= Alina Briedelytė-Kavaliauskienė =

Lithuanian painter

Alina Audronė Briedelytė-Kavaliauskienė (17 March 1942 – 18 November 1992) was a Lithuanian painter. She graduated from the Lithuanian Art Institute in 1966.

== Biography ==
From 1960 to 1966, she studied textile arts at the Vilnius Academy of Arts. Since 1965, she worked as a textile artist-restorer at the Lithuanian Museum of History and Ethnography. Her works include tapestries ("Sea" 1976 at the "Žuvėdra" resort in Palanga, "Light and Shadows" 1978 at the Lithuanian Blind Association factory, "Blossoming Tree" 1980, "Autumn Music" 1982, "Gates to the Cosmos" 1984), spatial rugs ("Quo Vadis. In Memory of Hiroshima" 1985), batiks, appliqué, and patterned fabric samples for the Panevėžys Linen Factory, as well as textile miniatures.

Her works are decorative, with compositions based on the harmonious arrangement of simplified, generalized forms. The space in her creations is altered according to the principles of optical art. Since 1966, she participated in exhibitions both in Lithuania and abroad. Her works are part of collections at the Lithuanian Art Museum and the Kaunas War Museum.

== See also ==
- List of Lithuanian painters
