= Juozas Kamarauskas =

Lithuanian painter

Juozas Kamarauskas (1874 April 29, Skauradai village, Ukmergė County (Now Širvintos District Municipality) – 1946 October 9, Vilnius) was a Lithuanian architect, painter and engineer.

== Gallery ==
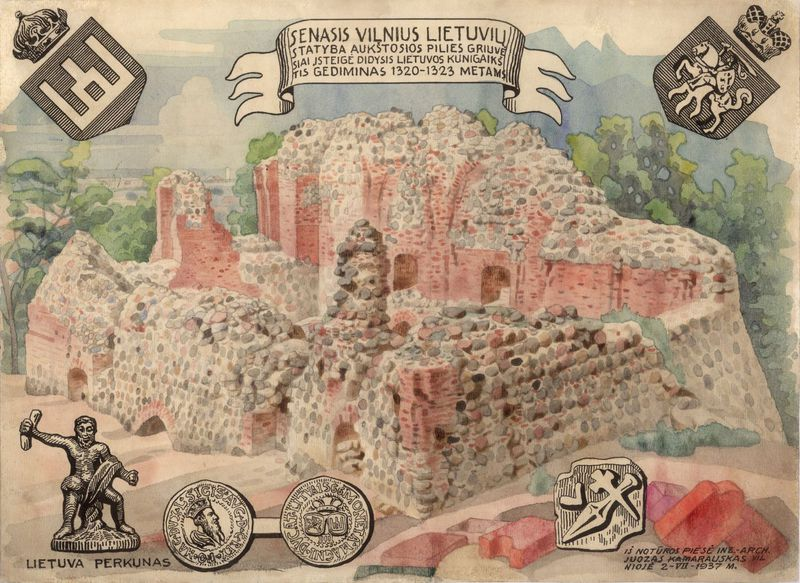
Ruins of the Vilnius Upper Castle

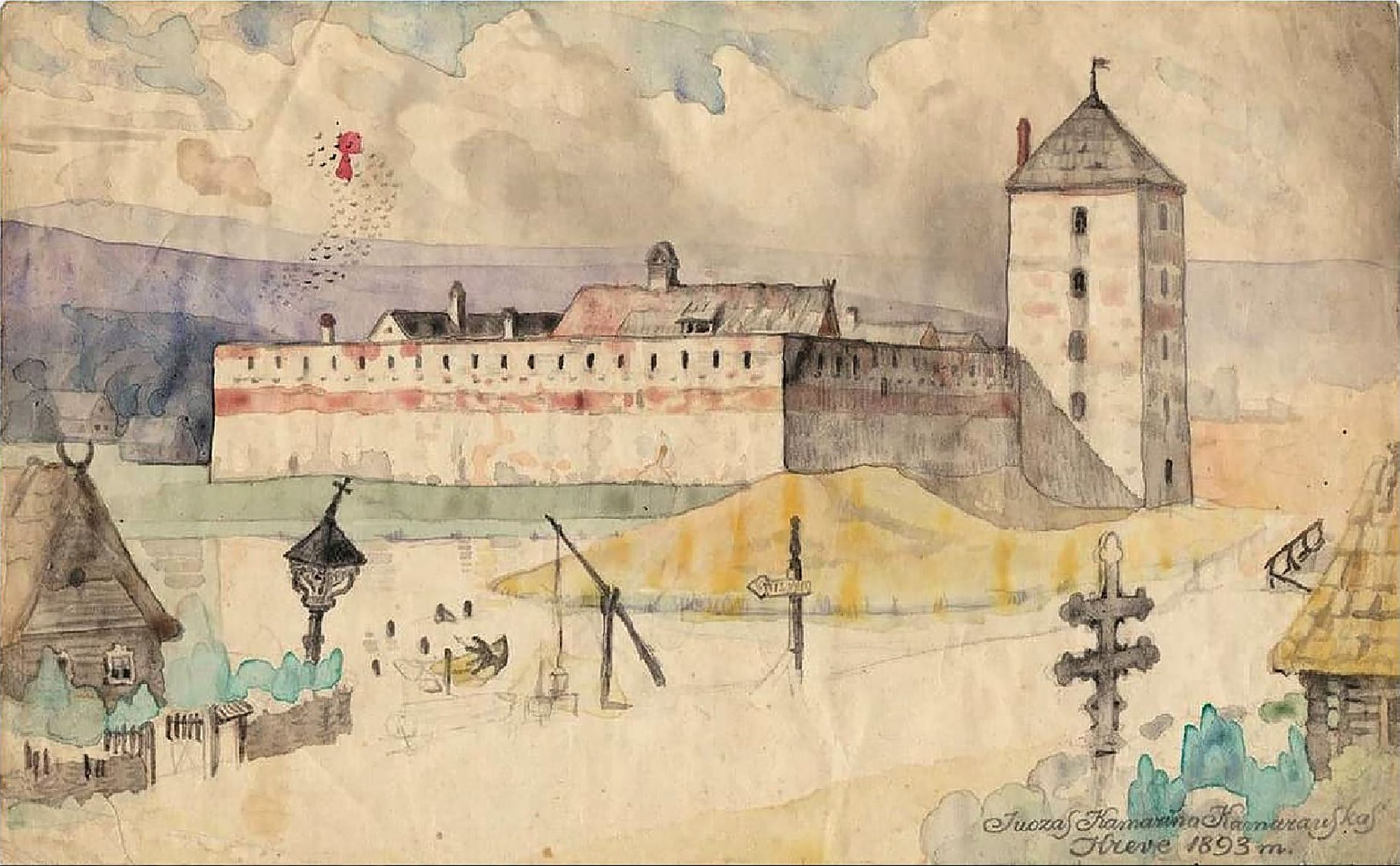
Reconstruction of the Kreva Castle

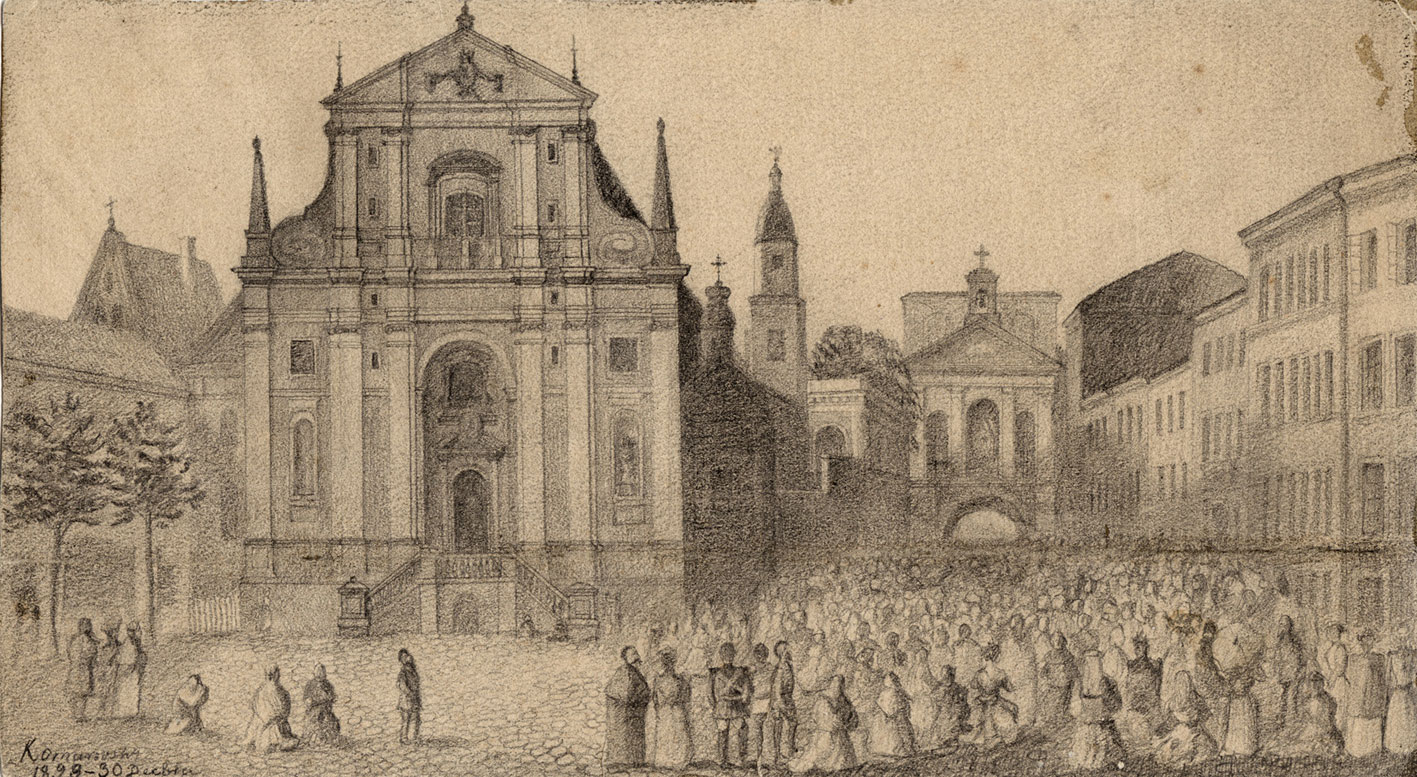
Gate of Dawn street

== See also ==
- List of Lithuanian painters
