= Kęstutis Lupeikis =

Lithuanian architect and painter (1962–2023)

Kęstutis Lupeikis (22 July 1962 – 7 October 2023) was a Lithuanian architect and painter.

== Biography ==
Kęstutis Lupeikis was born on 22 July 1962. He received state grants for his work in both fields, which had been shown at 10 solo and 38 group exhibitions in Lithuania and Germany. He designed the Public procurator's office in Vilnius.

Lupeikis died on 7 October 2023, at the age of 61.

== See also ==
- List of Lithuanian artists
- Visuotinė lietuvių enciklopedija

== Sources ==
- KLAP, Kęstutis Lupeikis architectural projects. Lithuanian Union of Architects. Accessed 2010-11-19.
- (in Lithuanian) Pastatai sostinėje perteikia neįprastas architektūrines idėjas. Delfi.lt. Accessed 2010-11-19.
