= Augis Kepežinskas =

Lithuanian set designer and costume designer

Augis Kepežinskas (born 27 May 1948 in Kaunas) is a Lithuanian set designer and costume designer.

The brother of Rimvydas Kepežinskas, he graduated from the Lithuanian Institute of Fine Arts in 1973 and began working on Lithuanian television. He has since been responsible for the costumes and designing sets of many television feature films and theatrical performances, including at the Lithuanian Drama Theatre, Siauliai Drama Theatre and Kaunas Drama Theatre throughout the late 1970s and 1980s.

He also participates in exhibitions in Lithuania and abroad.
