= Vilmantas Marcinkevičius =

Lithuanian painter

Vilmantas Marcinkevičius (born 1969) is a Lithuanian painter. From 1989 to 1995 he studied in the department of painting at the Vilnius Academy of Art. The painter has held 30 personal exhibitions in Lithuania, Denmark, France, Sweden and the Faroe Islands. The artist participated in the Copenhagen, Cologne and tribal art fairs. Already in 1998 he starts a cooperation with Gallery NB in Viborg Denmark. He has continued to exhibit there at regular intervals.

== Creativity ==
Marcinkevičius is noted for his bright colors, with soft lines, often a simplified image. Marcinkevičius's artwork often is created in relation to about the nation's history, state and individual, political, economic and personal gains and losses but he leaves the viewer to interpret his works by painting suggestive art forms.

== Portraits ==
Marcinkevičius notably has been hired by the Danish Royal family and other prominent persons to paint their portraits.

- 2007 - Peter Møller, Jernstøberi Mors, Denmark
- 2006 - Leif Davidsen, Danish author
- 2006 - Britta Duelund, Faaborgo Mayor, Denmark
- 2004 - Princess Alexandra and Prince Joachim of Denmark
- 2004 - Peter T. Kirstein, University College London (UCL), Professor, London, UK
- 2002 - Steffen Andreasen, Mayor Tjele, Denmark

== Project activity ==
Marcinkevičius has actively participated in various art projects in Lithuania and abroad. He was one of the project Bees "Art Area" collaborators. Currently Vilmantas Marcinkevičius led the Lithuanian Artists Union in Vilnius painting section. In March 2009 he won the weekly online Showdown competition run by the Saatchi Gallery meaning that his "Madonna of the 21st Century" would be displayed at the Saatchi Gallery in London.
