= Eglė Bogdanienė =

Lithuanian textile artist

Eglė Bogdanienė (born August 1, 1962, in Vilnius) is a Lithuanian textile artist.

She graduated from the Lithuanian Institute of Fine Arts in 1985 and worked in the Vilnius Academy of Fine Arts, in the Textile Department from 1991 to 2002.

She is the creator of textile compositions and tapestries, carefully weaving in subtle colors. Since1986, she has participated in art exhibitions in Lithuania and foreign countries.
