= Filomena Linčiūtė-Vaitiekūnienė =

Lithuanian set designer and painter

Filomena Linčiūtė-Vaitiekūnienė (born 17 April 1942 in Mažeikiai) is a Lithuanian set designer and painter.

== Biography ==
In 1965, she graduated from the Lithuanian Institute of Fine Arts. She worked at the Lithuanian Radio and Television Committee in 1965–1968, at the Lithuanian Film Studio in 1968–1986, and the Lithuanian National Radio and Television in 1986–1999.

== Works ==
Linčiūtė-Vaitiekūnienė created scenic design and costumes for about 40 different plays, including plays staged by the Kaunas Drama Theatre (King Matt the First by Janusz Korczak in 1969; Black Comedy by Peter Shaffer in 1971), Kaunas State Musical Theatre (Three Evenings by Benjaminas Gorbulskis in 1966; Silva by Emmerich Kálmán in 1978), Lithuanian Academic Drama Theatre (Bridge by Algimantas Baltakis in 1970; Louis XIV by Jan-Olof Ekholm in 1981; The Rats by Gerhart Hauptmann in 1988), Lithuanian National TV (Le Bel indifférent by Jean Cocteau in 1976; Barbora Radvilaitė by Juozas Grušas in 1982). She also worked on the TV show Vizijos ir tikrovė and 12 films, including Devil's Bride in 1974, Oaks Fell in 1976, Trip to the Paradise in 1980. In 1990s, she created scenic design for events and concerts, including children's song competition Dainų dainelė in 1992 and international folklore festival Baltica in 1993.

Linčiūtė-Vaitiekūnienė is also a painter. She created cycles of oil pastels Reflectors of India (1997), Bird LITUA in Quedlinburg (2002), Trees and Towers (2006–2007), The Pathways of the Promised Land (2009). From 1978, she has participated in numerous art exhibitions. Her solo exhibitions were held multiple times in Vilnius, as well as in India, Plungė, Klaipėda, Kaunas, Mažeikiai, Druskininkai.

== See also ==
- List of Lithuanian painters
