= Vladimiras Beresniovas =

Belarusian-born Lithuanian artist, humorist, and poet

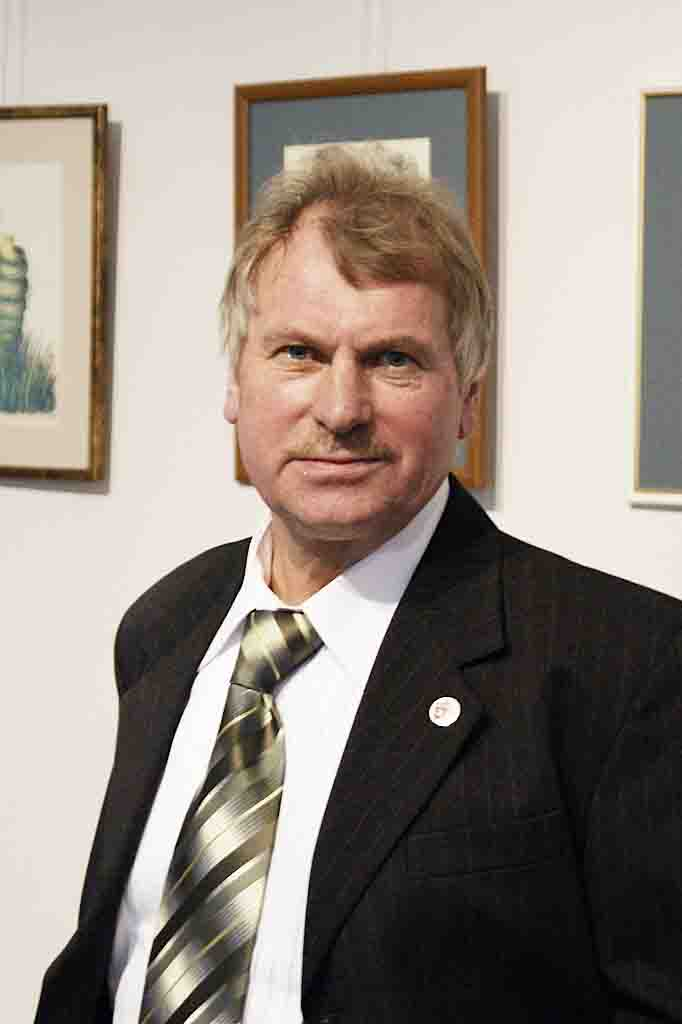
- Born: Vladimir Beresnev; 13 December 1948 (age 77); Boronki, Mogilev Region, Byelorussian Soviet Socialist Republic, Soviet Union
- Occupations: artist, cartoonist, poet

Vladimiras Beresniovas (Russian: Владимир Береснев, romanized: Vladimir Beresnev; born 13 December 1948), known under his pen name Vlaber (Влабер) is a Lithuanian artist, humorist, poet, and cartoonist. Vlaber has been an active participant in the Lithuanian and world artistic communities for more than 40 years. In the last 10 years, he has illustrated more than 100 books, published weekly cartoons in the local newspapers, and been named to Who's Who in Lithuania in 2008.

== Biography ==
Beresniovas was born in Soviet Belarus in 1948. He lost his parents at a young age and at the age of 13, he found himself completely orphaned when his only remaining relative, his grandmother, died. He moved around the Soviet Union until he finally settled in Lithuanian city of Kaunas. Beresniovas learned the Lithuanian language fluently, and graduated from the Kaunas College of Art. He then submitted some of his early drawings to a local newspaper and they were published immediately.

exhibitions in 20 countries, including Greece and Bulgaria.

He is a member of the Lithuanian Artists Association, the Lithuanian Journalists Union, and the Lithuanian Cartoonists Association.

== Bibliography ==
=== Published books ===
- Linksmoteka (2008)
- Geriau Ragas ant Kaktos (2002)
- Vlaber Cartoons (1998)

=== Illustrated books ===
- Meiles glebyje (1993), V. Eidukaitis
- Hienos kailis (1994), A. Tamaliunas
- Liaudies medicina (1994), A. Malovickas
- Mirti jau mokame, laikas išmokti gyventi (1996), A. Malovickas
- Ir višta - paukštis (1995), V. Elmiškis
- Meiles ašmenys (1993), R. Klusas
- Ceslovas Juršenas (1996)
- Šaipokai (1997)
- Linksmai apie meile (2007)
- Esu pats sau paslaptis (1997), L. Inis
- Pilnaties paunksmeje (1997)
- Esu toks, koks esu (2000)
- Šerpaitis, vejo dievaitis (2004)
- Neužmirštuoliu kalnas (2005)
- Paslapti žino tik moterys (2006)
- Pamišeliai ir šventosios (2007)
- Vejo vartai (2007)
- Išvirkšcias žmogus (2004), A. Dabulskis
- Žvaigždeto dangaus paslaptys (1998), R. Kundrotiene
- Po mokyklos stogu (2006)
- Netikra gaida (1998), J. Kundroto
- Žengiantis su laiku (2004)
- Sakme apie knygneši (2004)
- Kryžiau, prikales mane (2006)
- Likimas, paspendes spastus (2008)
- Mišiugino dienoraštis (1999), J. Gimberis
- Anykšciu šilelis (2003), A. Baranauskas
- Laisvos valandos (2005), V. Kudirka
- Prietemos paukšciai (2006), A. Zeka
- Velyvos alyvos (2006)
- Biography series: Portretai, Nostradamas (1994), Neronas (1994), Albertas Kamiu (1995), Hitleris (1995, 1997), Nostradamo sunus (1997), Stalinas (1997), Musolinis (1998), Nikolajus II (1998), Mao šešelis (1999), Dostojevskis (1999), Vašingtonas (1999), Leonardas da Vincis (1999), Servantesas (1999)

== Websites ==
- Official website
