= Ona Baliukonė =

Lithuanian poet and painter

- Born: 1 June 1948; Kančėnai, Daugai Rural Municipality, Alytus County, Lithuanian SSR, Soviet Union
- Died: 20 November 2007 (aged 59); Vilnius, Lithuania
- Resting place: Antakalnis Cemetery
- Other names: Onė Baliukonytė
- Occupations: Poet, painter
- Awards: Lithuanian National Prize for Culture and Arts (2005)

Ona Baliukonė, also known as Onė Baliukonytė,(1948–2007) was a Lithuanian poet and painter. She was born in the Alytus District Municipality and graduated from Vilnius University in 1971.

== See also ==
- List of Lithuanian painters
