= Virginija Kalinauskaitė =

Lithuanian artist (born 1957)

Virginija Kalinauskaitė (born 27 January 1957, in Panevėžys) is a Lithuanian graphic artist.

== Biography ==
In 1983, she graduated from the Lithuanian Institute of Art. Since 2001, she was Vilnius Graphic Art Centre and Gallery director. She is a member of the Lithuanian Artists' Association.

== Works ==
Her work is etchings. They are characterized by virtuoso painting, subtle gray shadings, flamboyance ("Landscape with hay haystack" 1986, "Rose," "The Journey" "Circles," all in 1989, "Women" in 1994, "Two riders," 1999 on). He also creates aquatint, linocut free cutting behavior ("Rain," "Gypsy," both in 1984) Nuliejo watercolors. Since 1984 participates in exhibitions in Lithuania (the individual in Vilnius in 1986, 1990, in Panevezys in 1999, Panevezys Civic Art Gallery 2009) and abroad (international bookplate exhibition in Paris in 1990), Istanbul, Turkey.

== Illustrated books ==
- Ramutė Skučaitė. Wood Gifts 1985
- Julia Švabaitė-Gyliene. Gabriuko records in 1993
- Emilia Liegutė. Jim is a good dog, 2000, 2004, Rudžiukė
- Vytautas Račickas. Nippon wants to home: the girl that he loved dad in 2004
- Nijole Riaubaitė. Spider predators. Vilnius, Club 13 and Ko, 2006 ISBN 978-9955-9909-0-1
- Nijole Riaubaitė. Princess civilization. Vilnius, Gilija, 2005 ISBN 9955-9569-4-1
- Maria Dunowska, Teresa Kolenda. Polish language textbook in class II, Light, 2007
- Virginija Kalinauskaitė, РIЗНОБАРВНI БАЙКИ. РIЗНОБАРВНI БАЙКИ. 2008

== See also ==
- List of Lithuanian artists
