= Konstancija Brundzaitė =

Lithuanian painter

Konstancija Brundzaitė (1942–1971) was a Lithuanian painter.

== See also ==
- List of Lithuanian painters
