= Balys Macutkevičius =

Lithuanian painter

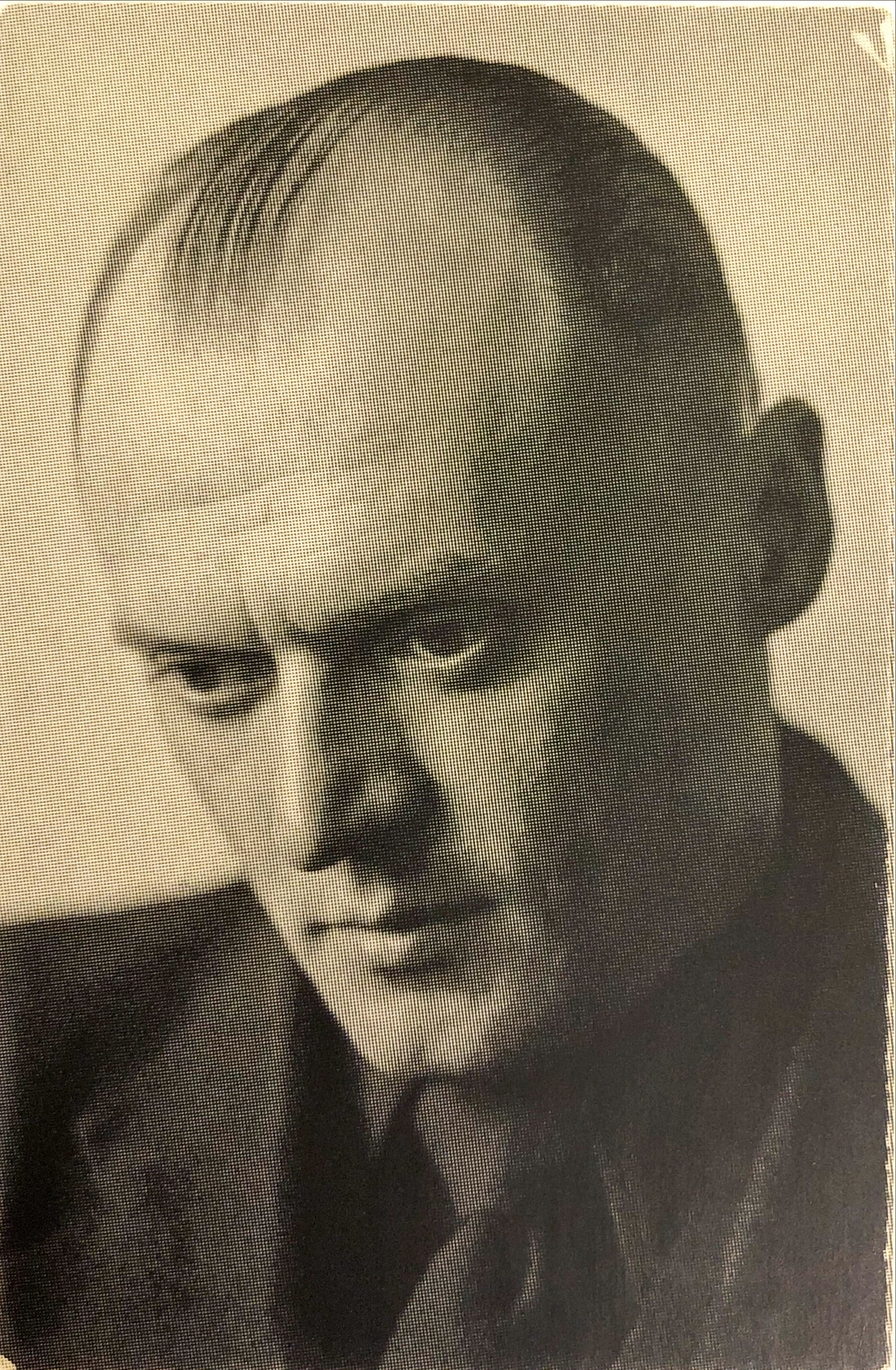

Balys Macutkevičius (1905–1964) was a Lithuanian painter.

== See also ==
- List of Lithuanian painters
