= Romualdas Aleliūnas =

Lithuanian ceramic artist

Romualdas Aleliūnas (25 March 1960 – 7 December 2016) was a Lithuanian designer of ceramics from Panevėžys.

He graduated from the S. Žuko Applied Art college in Kaunas in 1978, and was fluent in Lithuanian and Russian. In 1985, he began participating in international art and ceramic exhibitions in different countries, including Austria, Germany, the Netherlands, Norway, Poland, and Spain. In 1997, he became a member of the Lithuanian Artists' Association.

He was the creator of monumental decorative compositions from šamoto: "Return" in 1989, "Silence" in 1991, "Tower" 1992, "Box" in 1994, "Castle" in 1996, "Vase" in 1997. His works often combined round and square shapes.

He moved to Kupiškis around 2003. In 2015, he was nominated to run for the Kupiškis city council.

Aleliūnas died on 7 December 2016, aged 57, after collapsing suddenly at home.

== See also ==
- List of Lithuanian painters
