= Rūta Jokubonienė =

Lithuanian textile artist (1930–2010)

Rūta Birutė Jokubonienė (14 January 1930 – 14 May 2010) was a Lithuanian textile artist.

== Biography ==
In 1954, Rūta Birutė Jokubonienė graduated from the Lithuanian Institute of Fine Arts where she studied with Balčikonis J. Sofia Veiverytė.

From 1954 to 1962, she worked in a factory in Kaunas. From 1962 to 1985, she worked at the P. Ziberto silk factory in Kaunas, and from 1985 to 1990, she worked at the Restoration Trust for Culture in Vilnius. From 1972 to 1978, she taught at the Art Institute of Kaunas, Lithuanian Department of the west.

Rūta Jokubonienė created more than 250 multi-purpose fabrics. The first in Lithuania to create a new composition of silk fabrics, they are characterized by rhythmic harmony of subtle colors.

Her work has been acquired by museums in Vilnius and Kaunas, as well as the P.M. Tretjakovo Gallery in Moscow.

== Major works ==
- Silk jacquard wallpaper – A. Pushkin State Museum, Vilnius, 1986
- Silk jacquard wallpaper – T. Shevchenko Museum, Kiev, 1987
- Silky fabric – Verkiai House Ladies room wallpaper, 1987
- Silky fabric wall hangings – Writers' Union, 1988
- Portjeriniai jacquard fabrics – Trakai Palace Vokes, 1987

== See also ==
- List of Lithuanian artists
- "Rūta Jokubonienė ", Lithuanian Wikipedia
