= Aldona Jonuškaitė-Šaltenienė =

Lithuanian artist

Aldona Jonuškaitė-Šaltenienė (born 6 October 1943 Utena) is a Lithuanian ceramic artist.

== Biography ==
In 1967, she graduated from the Lithuanian Institute of Fine Arts, with teachers Mikėnas J., Aldona Ličkutė-Jusionienė. In 1972–1989, she designed ceramics at the Vilnius Art Factory. Since 1989, she lectures at the Lithuanian Institute of Art (from the 1990 Academy of Fine Arts), from 1992 Associate Professor. In 1998, she was artist in residence at the Maryland Institute College of Art (Baltimore).

== Works ==
She is the creator of indoor ceramic compositions (1972-1973 Vegetation, Water and Land Reclamation Ministry of Vilnius, the company now, "Lithuanian land reclamation), decorative plates ("Mathias Casimir Sarbievius" 1980), installations ("Celebration" 1996-1998 "Legacy" 1996, "Desire" in 2001) Nulipdė zoomorfinių shapes, their compositions ("Longing" 1983, "Three of the beast," "Lone Wolf", "Night", all in 1984, "Pastoral "1986," Dinner "in 1995) ceramics is characterized by the idea and the form of unity, associativity, expression, expressive texture and grotesque elements, sculptural plastics (" City "," ancient, "" Fate, "all in 1986" Requiem, "" Sacrifice ", both 1988 – architectonic, constructive.

Since 1970, she has participated in exhibitions, individual exhibitions held in Vilnius in 1993, 1997, 1998. She has shown in more than 30 international exhibitions in Lithuania and abroad (International Ceramics Exhibition in Faenza in 1987), Art Gallery "Dalia", and works in Lithuanian Art Museum, the National Čiurlionis Museum of Art, National Museum of Lithuania.

== Awards ==
- 1985 Triennial in Tallinn, the Baltic States Grand Prix
- 1998 Lithuanian National Culture and Arts Award

== See also ==
- List of Lithuanian artists
