= Liudvikas Strolis =

Lithuanian painter

Liudvikas Strolis (1905–1996) was a Lithuanian ceramist.

He studied painting at the Kaunas Art School and later studied painting and ceramics at the National Conservatory of Arts and Crafts in Paris.

He also taught at Kaunas Art School and the Vilnius Art Institute; he was awarded the Order of the Lithuanian Grand Duke Gediminas, 3rd degree in 1995.

== See also ==
- List of Lithuanian artists
