= Gražina Degutytė-Švažienė =

Lithuanian ceramic artist

Gražina Degutytė-Švažienė (born 7 June 1938 in Tauragė) is a Lithuanian ceramic artist.

== Biography ==
Gražina Degutytė-Švažienė graduated from the Lithuanian Institute of Fine Arts. Since 1962, she has worked and taught at the Lithuanian Institute of Art (since 1990 at the Vilnius Academy of Fine Arts). She has curated exhibits.

== Awards ==
- 1982 Lithuanian Art Fund Prize, Lithuanian Ministry of Culture

== Works ==
- pano "Kalnai", 1972 m., Dombajus, Karačiajų Čerkesija
- pano "Uždanga" ir plokštės "Atspindžiai" 1980 m., Ponizovka, Krymas
- plokštės "Pajūrio architektūra" ir šviestuvai "Burės", "Slibinas" 1992 m., poilsio namai "Auksinės kopos", Nida
- plokštės "Augalai" 1996 m., Lietuvos telekomas, Vilnius

== See also ==
- List of Lithuanian painters
