= Danguolė Brogienė =

Lithuanian designer and professor (born 1959)

Danguolė Brogienė (born 1959) is a Lithuanian textile designer, and Associate Professor of the Costume Design Department of Vilnius Academy of Arts, Lithuania.

In 1982, she graduated from the Lithuanian Institute of Art (since 1990 Vilnius Academy of Fine Arts). She is on the jury of Habitus Baltija.

She is the creator resolution texture tapestries, textile works of hybrid technology in space, Earth's theme ("Land application" I-III in 1982, "Nepalikim land" in 1987, "Moon strain, 7, cafe" weather vane "in Vilnius, 1989 ). Since 1995, she joins the copyrighted silk, viscose thread technique ("Hope" Ministry of Internal Affairs, 1995, "Letters of Light," "Ornament", both Lithuanian international carriers association Linava, 1996, "Poems: Air, Water, Earth, Fire "2001-2002). A typical fragmentary rhythm pattern, rich colors, optically variable image. Creator textile miniatures, jewelry.

Since 1982, she participated in exhibitions in Lithuania and abroad, individual exhibitions: Detroit in 1993, Vilnius in 2002-2003, an international exhibition in 1999 Kanadzavoje Works, Lithuanian Museum of Art.

== See also ==
- List of Lithuanian painters
