= Lolita Kreivaitienė =

Lithuanian designer

Lolita Kreivaitienė (born 15 January 1960 in Kaunas) is a Lithuanian designer.

Since 1984 she has participated in exhibitions in Lithuania and abroad. She held an individual exhibition in Hamburg in 1992. Her works are on display at the Lithuanian Art Museum.
