= Angelina Banytė =

Lithuanian painter

Angelina Banytė (born 1949) is a Lithuanian painter.

She graduated from the Lithuanian Institute of Art in 1974. Since 1978, she has been a member of Lithuanian artists' association. Her work appears at the Clock Museum. Since 1976, she has lived in Klaipėda.

== Works ==
- Dainavos šalis – "Dainavos" sanatorija, Druskininkai, 1974 m.
- Jūros dugnas – "Gintaro" poilsio namai, Palanga, 1976 m.
- Medicina – Klaipėdos ligoninė, 1976 m.
- Gamtos dovanos – "Pušyno" poilsio namai, Palanga 1978 m.
- Mūsų kraštas – su Natalija Daškova ir Sofija Veiveryte, Agrarinės ekonomikos institutas, Vilnius, 1980 m.
- Paukščiai – Klaipėdos gimdymo namai, 1981 m.
- Laikas ir Klaipėda – su Juozu Vosyliumi, Klaipėdos laikrodžių muziejus, 1996 m.
- Dievas Tėvas – Klaipėdos Marijos Taikos Karalienės bažnyčia, 1996 m.

== See also ==
- List of Lithuanian painters
