= Danutė Eidukaitė =

Lithuanian ceramist

Danutė Eidukaitė (12 July 1929 in Kupiškis – 23 February 1995 in Kaunas) was a Lithuanian ceramist. She created vases, memorial plates, tea sets.

In 1953 she graduated from the Vilnius Academy of Art. From 1953 to 1965 she taught at an art school in Kaunas. In 1959 her works began to appear in various exhibitions. From 1965 to 1969 Eidukaitė worked at the Dailė combine. In 1970 and 1980 she held personal exhibitions in Kaunas.

Some of her noted works are decorative plates (a set for the 400th anniversary of Vilnius University in 1979; Kaunas, Senasis Kaunas (Old Kaunas), and Lietuvos knygnešiai (Lithuanian book smugglers) in 1980), panels for interior decoration (Jaunimas (Youth) in 1971, Raigardas in 1982, Iš senojo pašto istorijos (From the History of the Old Post Office) in 1984), decorative vases in archaic or floral forms (Vaza su aselėmis (Vase with Handles) in 1971, Nida in 1972, Skrydis (Flight) in 1983). Her household dishes are functional, usually glazed in cheerful colors.
