= Zinaida Irutė Dargienė =

Lithuanian textile artist

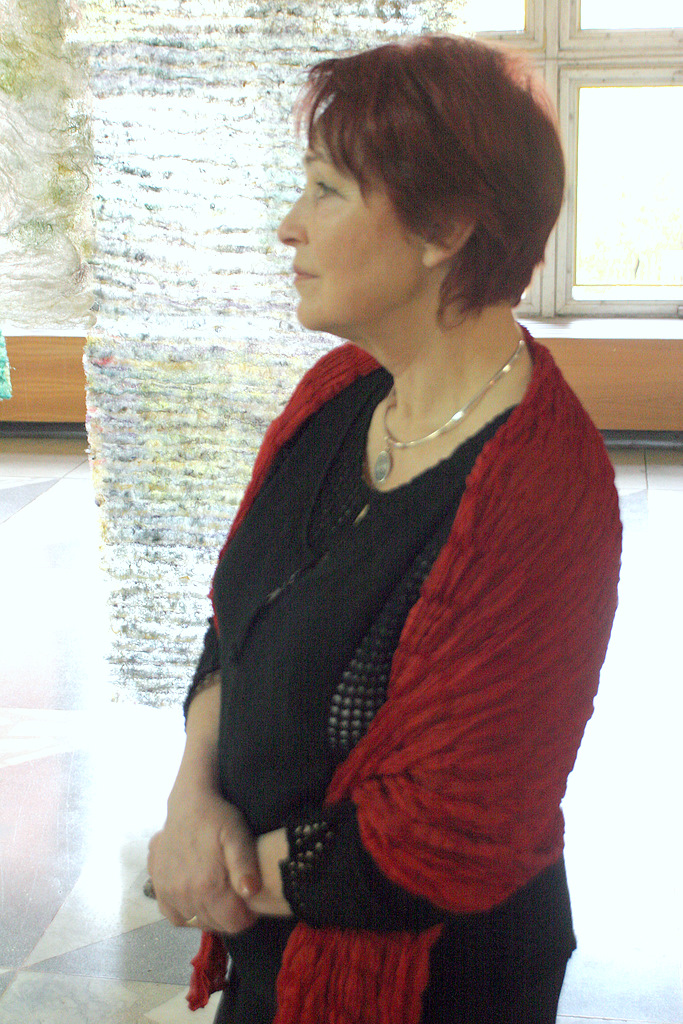
- Born: 8 December 1936 (age 89); Mažeikiai, Lithuania
- Known for: Textiles

Zinaida Irutė Dargienė (born 1936 Mažeikiai, Lithuania) is a Lithuanian textile artist.

== Training ==
Dargienė attended the Vilnius Academy of Arts (Kaunas Textile Arts Department), graduating in 1965. In 1997 she did an internship at the Shankar School of Arts, Israel.
