= Zinaida Kalpokovaitė-Vogėlienė =

Lithuanian textile artist

Zinaida Kalpokovaitė-Vogėlienė (born 2 March 1941) is a Lithuanian textile artist.

She graduated from the Lithuanian Institute of Fine Arts in 1966. Her works use unconventional materials and different techniques. Her output is characterized by a delicate sense of aesthetic, technological excellence, innovation, tapestries often abstract expressionist in composition style, and she often uses bright or subtle colors. Since 1965 she has participated in exhibitions in Lithuania and abroad. Her works are on display in the Lithuanian Art Museum, Lithuanian National Museum, and National Museum of Fine Arts (Čiurlionis).
