= Vita Opolskytė =

Lithuanian painter (born 1992)

Vita Opolskytė (born 1992) is a Lithuanian painter.

== Biography ==
Vita Opolskytė studied painting in Vilnius Academy of Arts and Antwerpen Karel de Grote University College. She is an active participants of group exhibitions, art projects and workshops.

== Works ==
The main motive in this painter's works is interior. She mixes different scales of interior objects, direction of perspective and viewing points. By doing so, she creates illogical spaces where both real and surreal details of the interior are merged, casual and unusual objects are laying around and small figures of kids and animals are shown.

Vita Opolskytė explores the relationship between reality and fiction and encourages to doubt what is real and what is not. In her works, individual mythology and universal symbols are used as well as personal experience with common cultural incidents.

== Awards and personal show ==
- In 2016 she became a 2nd prize winner at international contest ‘Young painters prize’16’ in Vilnius, Lithuania
- In 2015 she won additional prize at international contest ‘Young painters prize’15’ in Vilnius, Lithuania
- In 2014, she held personal show ‘Medications for Reality’ at ‘LIIIm3 artspace’ gallery in Antwerpen, Belgium
