= Kaunas Art School =

Art school in Kaunas, Lithuania

Kaunas School of Arts
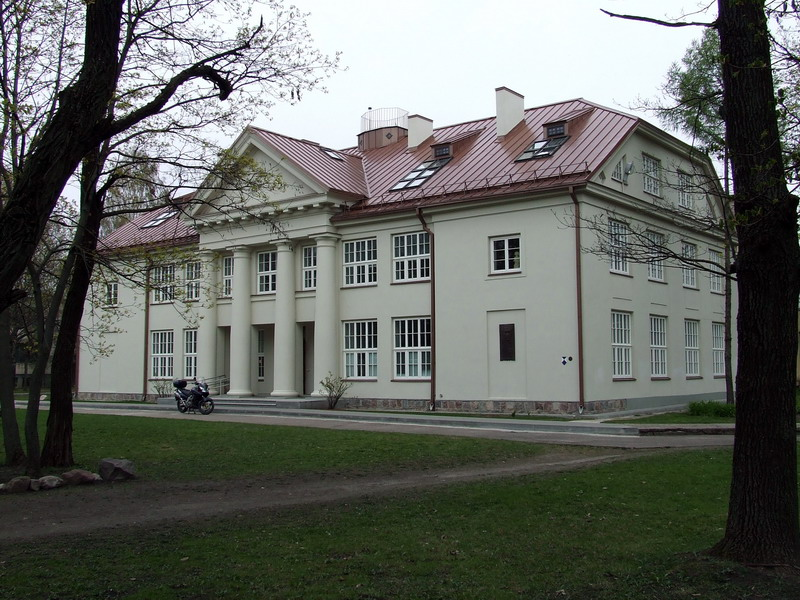
- Former building of the Kaunas School of Arts
- Type: Public art school
- Active: 1922–1940
- Director: Liudvikas Strolis (last)
- Students: 120 (in 1932)
- Location: Kaunas, Lithuania; 54°54′03″N 23°54′02″E
- Campus: Urban

Kaunas School of Arts (Lithuanian: Kauno meno mokykla) was a public art school, which operated from 1922 to 1940 in Kaunas, Lithuania. At the time, it was the only operating art school in Lithuania. The institution continued to exist (under other names) in the Lithuanian SSR, as well as in modern Lithuania, after the restoration of Lithuanian independence.

In 1951 its location was moved to Ąžuolai Hill (now Pelėdų Hill).

== Names ==
- 1920: Aukštieji piešimo kursai
- 1922: Kauno meno mokykla
- 1940: Kauno taikomosios dailės mokykla
- 1940: Kauno taikomosios dailės institutas
- 1944: Kauno taikomosios ir dekoratyvinės dailės institutas
- 1951: Kauno taikomosios dailės vidurinė mokykla
- 1954: Kauno Stepo Žuko taikomosios dailės vidurinė mokykla
- 1959: Kauno Stepo Žuko taikomosios dailės technikumas
- 1989: Kauno aukštesnioji meno mokykla
- 2001: Kauno kolegijos Justino Vienožinskio menų studijų centras
  This year it was integrated into Kauno kolegija, a state higher education institution
- 2005: Kauno kolegijos Justino Vienožinskio menų fakultetas
- 2018: Kauno kolegijos Menų ir ugdymo fakultetas

== Notable alumni ==
- Veronika "Vėra" Šleivytė (1906-1998), photographer, painter, and graphic artist, graduated in 1934.
- Vytautas Kašuba (1915-1997), sculptor, graduated in 1939.
