= Sofija Veiverytė =

Lithuanian painter

Sofija Veiverytė (April 13, 1926 in Naujatriobiai, Kaunas district – July 23, 2009 in Vilnius) was a Lithuanian artist. She studied monumental painting at the Kaunas Applied and Decorative Arts Institute. From 1951 to 1985 she lectured at the Lithuanian Art Institute. Her works are monumental and expressive.

== Publications ==
- Monographs, 1976 and 1968
- Exhibition catalogues, Vilnius 1981 and Bulgaria 1986
- Book of reproductions of her paintings, 1987

== Honours and awards ==
- People's Artist of Lithuania
- Honoured Art Worker (1974)
- Painter of the Nation (1976)
- Lithuania Prize (1976)
- Laureate of Baltic Countries (1981)
- Exhibition Silver Medal, Moscow (1981)
- Grand Prix for portrait, Yugoslavia Biennale (1984)
- Order of Friendship of Peoples (1986)
- Order of the Lithuanian Grand Duke Gediminas (1996)
- Estonian Order of the White Star, Fifth Class (2004)
- 1st prize in paintings exhibition in Lithuania (2006)
