= Lithuanian Artists' Association =

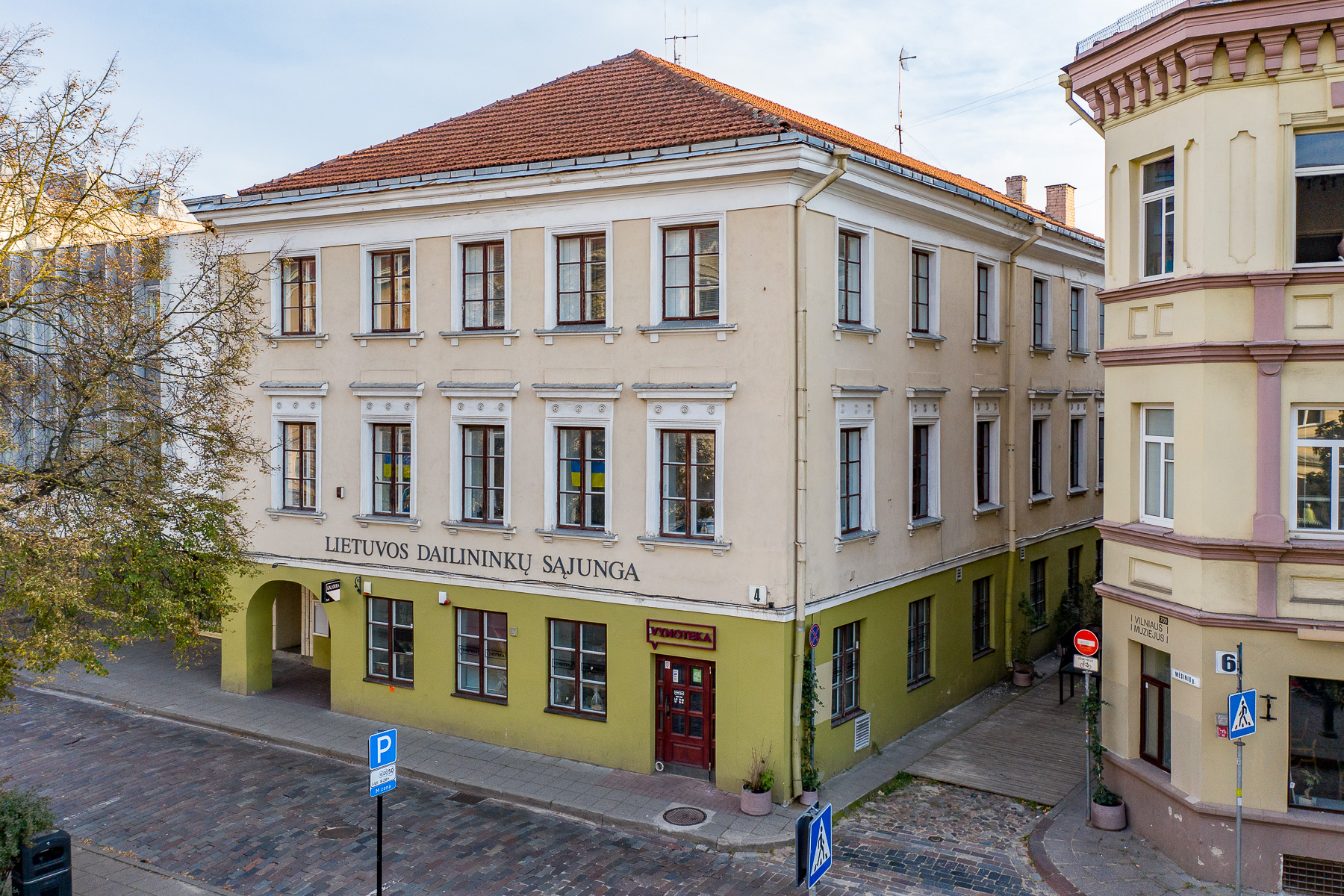
Lithuanian Artists' Association in 2023

The Lithuanian Artists' Association (Lithuanian: Lietuvos dailininkų sąjunga) is a creative voluntary artistic organization in Lithuania, uniting professional painters and artists. It is the official association for artists in the country. The association works towards stimulating and promoting the work of unions, protecting their copyright, and preparing and participating in creative efforts such as galleries etc. From 1940-1941 it was known as the Lithuanian Artists' trade union, from 1989 again the Lithuanian Artists' Union or Association.

== Presidents ==
- Justinas Vienožinskis – 1935-1936
- Viktoras Vizgirda – 1936-1938
- Antanas Smetona – 1938-1940
- Antanas Žmuidzinavičius – 1940
- Mečislovas Bulaka, Stepas Žukas –1940-1941
- Adalbertas Staneika – 1942-1944
- Liuda Vaineikytė – 1944-1956
- Vytautas Mackevičius – 1956-1958
- Jonas Kuzminskis – 1958-1982
- Konstantinas Bogdanas – 1982-1987
- Bronius Leonavičius – 1987-1992
- Algimantas Biguzas – 1992-1994
- Gvidas Raudonius – 1994-1998
- Vaclovas Krutinis – 1998-2008
- Eugenijus Nalevaika – 2008-2012
- Edita Utarienė – from 2012
