= List of recipients of the Lithuanian National Prize for Culture and Arts =

The Lithuanian National Prize for Culture and Arts honors achievements in Lithuanian culture and arts. It is traditionally awarded on February 16, commemorating the Act of Independence of Lithuania. The awards are conferred by the Lithuanian Ministry of Culture.

== 1989 ==
- Jonas Juškaitis – poet,
- Algirdas Martinaitis – composer,
- Šarūnas Sauka – painter,
- Kornelijus Matuzevičius – film director,
- Henrikas Šablevičius – movie director,
- Čiurlionis String Quartet, performers:
  - Rimantas Šiugždinis – 1st violin,
  - Saulius Kiškis – 2nd violin,
  - Aloyzas Grižas – alto,
  - Saulius Lipčius – cello.

== 1990 ==
- Julius Juzeliūnas – composer,
- Kazys Napoleonas Kitkauskas – architect,
- Algirdas Steponavičius – painter,
- Zita Žemaitytė – art critic,
- Romualdas Požerskis – photographer.

== 1991 ==
- Vytautas Bložė – poet,
- Jeronimas Kačinskas – composer,
- Gediminas Karalius – sculptor,
- Bronius Radzevičius (posthumous) – writer,
- Povilas Ričardas Vaitekūnas – painter.

== 1992 ==
- Valentinas Antanavičius – painter,
- Kazys Bradūnas – poet,
- Vladas Drėma – art critic,
- Petras Geniušas – pianist,
- Arvydas Šliogeris – philosopher.

== 1993 ==
- Petras Bingelis – choir conductor,
- Viktorija Daujotytė – literary critic,
- Vytautas Kavolis – sociologist,
- Vytautas Kašuba – sculptor,
- Laimonas Noreika – actor

== 1994 ==
- Sigitas Geda – poet,
- Gintaras Rinkevičius – conductor,
- Algirdas Dovydėnas – painter,
- Regimantas Midvikis – painter,
- Algirdas Žebrauskas – architect,
- Ričardas Krištopavičius – architect,
- Arūnas Sakalauskas – painter,
- Rimas Tuminas – theatre director.

== 1995 ==
- Aleksandras Macijauskas – photographer,
- Raimundas Katilius – violinist,
- Bronius Kutavičius – composer,
- Algirdas Petrulis – painter,
- Vytautas Šerys – painter,
- Jonas Mekas – movie director,
- Antanas Rubšys – translator.

== 1996 ==
- Osvaldas Balakauskas – composer,
- Stanislovas Kuzma – sculptor,
- Valentinas Masalskis – actor,
- Vladimiras Prudnikovas – opera vocal soloist,
- Jonas Strielkūnas – poet,
- Eglė Špokaitė – ballet dancer,
- Vytautas Valius – painter.

== 1997 ==
- Alfonsas Nyka-Niliūnas (birth name Alfonsas Cipkus) – poet and writer,
- Onutė Narbutaitė – composer,
- Petras Repšys – painter,
- Juozas Erlickas – writer,
- Anatolijus Šenderovas – composer,
- Rūta Ibelhauptienė and Zbignevas Ibelhauptas – piano duo,
- Eimuntas Nekrošius – theatre director.

== 1998 ==
- Vidmantas Bartulis – composer,
- Feliksas Jakubauskas – painter,
- Algimantas Kunčius – photographer,
- Marcelijus Martinaitis – poet,
- Donatas Sauka – writer,
- Aldona Šaltenienė – painter,
- Alfredas Bumblauskas – historian,
- Algimantas Galinis – TV director,
- Edvardas Gudavičius – historian,
- Albertas Žostautas – editor.

== 1999 ==
- Jūratė Onaitytė – actress,
- Donaldas Kajokas – poet,
- Kęstutis Pempė – architect,
- Gytis Ramunis – architect,
- Augustinas Savickas – painter,
- Linas Leonas Katinas – painter,
- Mindaugas Navakas – sculptor,
- Albertas Zalatorius – literary critic,
- Saulius Sondeckis – artistic director and conductor of the Lithuanian Chamber Orchestra,
- Ona Narbutienė – musicologist.

== 2000 ==
- Eugenijus Cukermanas – painter,
- Dalia Kasčiūnaitė – painter,
- Romualdas Granauskas – writer,
- Tomas Venclova – writer,
- Nijolė Miliauskaitė – writer,
- Irena Milkevičiūtė – opera vocal soloist,
- Juozas Domarkas – conductor of the Lithuanian National Symphonic orchestra,
- Vladas Bagdonas – actor,
- Adomas Jacovskis – painter.

== 2001 ==
- Leonardas Gutauskas – writer,
- Šarūnas Bartas – movie director,
- Justinas Marcinkevičius – poet,
- Feliksas Bajoras – composer,
- Violeta Urmana – opera singer,
- Leonoras Vytautas Strioga – sculptor,
- Stasys Eidrigevičius – painter,
- Donatas Katkus – conductor, musicologist,
- Kostas Smoriginas – actor.

== 2002 ==
- Robertas Antinis – sculptor,
- Petras Vyšniauskas – jazz saxophonist,
- Oskaras Koršunovas – theatre director,
- Jurgis Juozapaitis – composer,
- Arvydas Každailis – painter,
- Audrius Stonys – movie director,
- Jonas Mikelinskas – writer,
- Kornelijus Platelis – writer,
- David Geringas – cellist.

== 2003 ==
- Algimantas Jonas Kuras – painter,
- Jonas Dainius Aleksa – conductor,
- Vytautas Juozapaitis – opera singer,
- Vytautas Barkauskas – composer,
- Antanas Jonynas – writer,
- Petras Dirgėla – writer,
- Bitė Vilimaitė – writer,
- Antanas Sutkus – photographer,
- Jonas Vaitkus – theatre director.

== 2004 ==
- Ona Baliukonė – writer,
- Sigitas Parulskis – writer,
- Jūratė Paulėkaitė – scenographer,
- Petras Mazūras – sculptor,
- Mikalojus Povilas Vilutis – silk-screen artist,
- Rytis Mažulis – composer,
- Sigutė Stonytė – opera singer,
- Stanislovas Žvirgždas – photographer,
- Vilnius State quartet performers:
  - Audronė Vainiūnaitė, 1st violin,
  - Artūras Šilalė, 2nd violin,
  - Girdutis Jakaitis, alto,
  - Augustinas Vasiliauskas, cello.

== 2005 ==
- Gintaras Varnas – theatre director,
- Laima Oržekauskienė – textile artist,
- Juozas Aputis – writer,
- Jurga Ivanauskaitė – writer,
- Ksenija Jaroševaitė – sculptor,
- Vytautas Laurušas – composer,
- Aidas Marčėnas – poet,
- Arūnas Matelis – movie director,
- Robertas Šervenikas – conductor.

== 2006 ==
- Saulius Juškys – architect,
- Kęstutis Navakas – writer and poet,
- Nijolė Lukšionytė-Tolvaišienė – architectural historian,
- Vytautas Balčytis – photographer,
- Jonas Vytautas Bruveris – musicologist,
- Rimvydas Kepežinskas – calligrapher and graphic artist,
- Mūza Rubackytė – pianist,
- Rimantas Sakalauskas – sculptor and ceramics artist
- Algirdas Vizgirda – flutist.

== 2007 ==
- Vytautas Kernagis – artist and musician,
- Alfonsas Andriuškevičius – art critic,
- Šarūnas Nakas – composer,
- Vytautas Paukštė – actor,
- Nomeda Urbonienė and Gediminas Urbonas – artists,
- Zinaida Nagytė-Katiliškienė (Lūnė Sutema) – poet.

== 2008 ==
- Antanas Gailius – poet and translator,
- Vanda Juknaitė – writer,
- Regina Rūta Staliliūnaitė Matulionienė – actress,
- Deimantas Narkevičius – media artist,
- Veronika Povilionienė – singer,
- Raminta Šerkšnytė – composer.

== 2009 ==
- Almantas Grikevičius – movie director,
- Jonas Rimgaudas Jurašas – theater director,
- Romualdas Rakauskas – photographer,
- Marija Matušakaitė – art critic,
- Ramutė Skučaitė – writer,
- Rolandas Kazlas – actor.

== 2010 ==
- Virgilijus Noreika – singer,
- Icchokas Meras – writer,
- Vaclovas Augustinas – composer and conductor,
- Rolandas Rastauskas – writer,
- Povilas Mataitis and Dalia Lidija Mataitienė – theater director and theater artist,
- Jonas Paulius Gasiūnas – painter.

== 2011 ==
- Vytautas Arūnas Žebriūnas – film director,
- Algimantas Aleksandravičius – photographer,
- Vytautas Landsbergis – musicologist,
- Kęstutis Grigaliūnas – visual artist,
- Henrikas Algis Čigriejus – writer,
- Asta Krikščiūnaitė – singer.

== 2012 ==
- Vladas Vildžiūnas – sculptor,
- Kęstutis Nastopka – literary critic,
- Vitalijus Mazūras – scenographer,
- Eugenijus Miliūnas – architect,
- Žilvinas Kempinas – visual artist,
- Modestas Pitrėnas – conductor.

== 2013 ==
- Donatas Banionis – actor,
- Faustas Latėnas – composer,
- Giedrius Kuprevičius – composer,
- Vladas Braziūnas – writer,
- Juozas Budraitis – actor,
- Jonas Gricius – cinematographer.

== 2014 ==
- Regimantas Adomaitis – actor,
- Jakovas Grigorijus Kanovičius – writer,
- Rolandas Palekas – architect,
- Nelė Savičenko – actress,
- Eimutis Valentinas Sventickas – writer, critic,
- Algirdas Šeškus – photo artist.

== 2015 ==
- Algirdas Jonas Ambrazas – musicologist,
- Leopoldas Digrys – musician,
- Dainius Gavenonis – actor,
- Giedra Radvilavičiūtė – writer,
- Vladas Urbanavičius – sculptor,
- Birutė Žilytė-Steponavičienė – graphic artist.

== 2016 ==
- Audrius Ambrasas – architect,
- Vytautas Anužis – actor,
- Viačeslavas Ganelinas, Vladimiras Tarasovas, Vladimiras Čekasinas – Jazz musicians,
- Rūta Katiliūtė – painter,
- Gytis Lukšas – director,
- Valdas Papievis – writer.

== 2017 ==
- Eglė Gabrėnaitė – actor
- Justė Gintvilė Janulytė – composer
- Danutė Dalia Kunickienė – writer
- Gintaras Makarevičius – scenographer
- Svajonė and Paulius Stanikai – visual artists
- Gintautas Trimakas – photographer

== 2018 ==
- Vytautas Martinkus – writer
- Mirga Gražinytė – conductor
- Marius Ivaškevičius – writer
- Audrius Kemežys – cinematographer
- Darius Meškauskas – actor
- Artūras Raila – visual artists

== 2019 ==
- Algimantas Puipa – film director
- Saulius Šaltenis – writer
- Asmik Grigorian − opera soloist
- Zita Bružaitė – composer
- Viktorija Kuodytė − actor
- Rugilė Barzdžiukaitė − artist
- Vaiva Grainytė − artist
- Lina Lapelyte − artist

== 2020 ==
- Jonas Tomaševičius - cinematographer
- Saulius Tomas Kondrotas - writer
- Rūta Stanevičiūtė - musicologist
- Regina Šaltenytė - actress
- Gintaras Balčytis - architect
- Eglė Ridikaitė - artist

== 2021 ==
- Vidas Petkevičius - actor
- Agnė Narušytė - art critic
- Vytautas Miškinis - choir conductor, composer
- Remigijus Treigys - photographer
- Dainius Liškevičius - creator of interdisciplinary art
- Daiva Vyčinienė - ethnomusicologist

== 2022 ==
The winners were announced on December 12. The selection was made from 30 nominations shortlisted to 12.

- Kazimieras Saja, writer, "for hunting "mammoths" in theater and prose"
- Mantas Kvedaravičius, posthumously, for his documentaries
- Rimvydas Stankevičius, poet, "for the classical gene in contemporary poetry"
- Edgaras Montvidas, opera singer, "for his successful creative activities promoting the Lithuanian singing school on world stages"
- Žibuoklė Martinaitytė-Rosaschi, composer, "for the depth of light and darkness in contemporary music"
- Giedrė Žickytė, film director, "for a vigorous and impressive creative leap"
