= 20th-century lyric poetry =

In the early years of the 20th century, rhymed lyric poetry, usually expressing the feelings of the poet, was the dominant poetic form in America, Europe and the British colonies. The relevance and acceptability of the lyric in the modern age was, though, called into question by modernism, the growing mechanization of human experience and the harsh realities of war. After the Second World War the form was again championed by the New Criticism, and in the late 20th century lyric became a mainstream poetic form again.

== Modernism ==
The dominance of lyric was challenged by American experimental modernists such as Ezra Pound, T. S. Eliot, H.D. and William Carlos Williams, who rejected the English lyric form of the 19th century, feeling that it relied too heavily on melodious language, rather than complexity of thought. However, Wallace Stevens and Hart Crane were modernists who also worked within the tradition of post-Romantic lyric poetry. Defenders of lyric poetry in the early 20th century saw it as an ally in the fight against mechanization, standardization and the commodification of human activities. The poetry of Guillaume Apollinaire represents an alternative view, that mechanization could extend the repertoire of lyric poetry.

== The First World War ==
The tension between the traditional subjects of lyric poetry and the horrors of war are expressed in the war poetry of Wilfred Owen, Siegfried Sassoon and Ivor Gurney. Owen's poem Strange Meeting has been described as "a dream of a conversation with a dead lyric poet, or possibly even dead lyric itself." The Irish poet William Butler Yeats's work up to 1917 is predominantly dramatic and lyric love poetry, but after the First World War he explores the political subjects of Irish independence, nationalism and civil war.

== New Criticism ==
The American New Criticism returned to the lyric in the 1950s, advocating a poetry that made conventional use of rhyme, meter and stanzas, and was modestly personal in the lyric tradition. Lyric poets consistent with the New Criticism ethos include Robert Frost and Robert Lowell. In the 1950s long personal epics, such as Allen Ginsberg's "Howl" were a reaction against the well-wrought short lyric of the New Criticism.

== Confessional poetry ==
Lyric poetry dealing with relationships, sex and domestic life constituted the new mainstream of American poetry in the late 20th century, influenced by the confessional poets of the 1950s and 1960s, such as Frank O'Hara, John Berryman, Sylvia Plath and Anne Sexton. In India, confessional poetry was introduced by the members of the Bengali Hungry generation poets, especially by Malay Roy Choudhury.

== Other notable 20th-century lyric poets ==
UK

- Dylan Thomas
- J.R.R. Tolkien
- Robert Graves
- Geoffrey Hill
- Ted Hughes

Canada

- P. K. Page
- George Bowering

France

- Paul Éluard
- Max Jacob
- Paul Valéry
- Blaise Cendrars

Germany

- Gottfried Benn
- Bertolt Brecht
- Paul Celan
- Stefan George
- Rainer Maria Rilke

Israel / Palestine

- Yehuda Amichai
- Mahmoud Darwish
- Leah Goldberg

Italy

- Eugenio Montale
- Giuseppe Ungaretti

Latvia

- Zinaida Lazda (pseudonym of Zinaida Sreibere)

Lithuania

- Jonas Aistis
- Janina Degutytė
- Sigitas Geda
- Antanas A. Jonynas
- Pranciška Regina Liubertaitė
- Maironis
- Vincas Mykolaitis-Putinas
- Justinas Marcinkevičius
- Salomėja Neris
- Henrikas Radauskas
- Liūnė Sutema
- Paulius Širvys
- Tomas Venclova

Poland

- Czesław Miłosz
- Zbigniew Herbert
- Wisława Szymborska

Portugal

- Fernando Pessoa

Brasil

- Manuel Bandeira
- Mário de Andrade
- Mário Quintana

Russia

- Alexander Blok
- Anna Akhmatova
- Marina Tsvetaeva
- Osip Mandelstam
- Vladimir Mayakovsky
- Boris Pasternak
- Sergei Yesenin
- Joseph Brodsky
- Bella Akhmadulina
- Andrei Voznesensky

Nicaragua

- Rubén Darío

Spain

- Federico García Lorca
- Antonio Machado

Chile

- Gabriela Mistral
- Pablo Neruda

Mexico

- Octavio Paz

Turkey

- Nazim Hikmet

Bengal

- Jibanananda Das
- Shakti Chattopadhyay
