= Marcelijus Martinaitis =

Lithuanian poet, essayist and translator

- Born: Marcelijus Teodoras Martinaitis; 1 April 1936; Paserbentys, Nemakščiai volost, Lithuania
- Died: 5 April 2013 (aged 77); Vilnius, Lithuania
- Citizenship: Lithuania
- Education: Vilnius University
- Occupations: Poet; essayist; translator
- Years active: 1955–2013
- Employer(s): Vilnius University, Jaunimo gretos desk
- Notable work: Kukučio baladės, Mes gyvenome, Toli nuo rugių
- Spouse: Gražina Marija Martinaitienė
- Awards: Lithuanian SSR State Prize (1984), Lithuanian National Prize for Culture and Arts (1998)

Marcelijus Teodoras Martinaitis (1 April 1936 – 5 April 2013) was a Lithuanian poet, essayist, translator.

== Biography ==
Marcelijus Martinaitis born in a peasants family in Paserbentys village (now liquidated) in Raseiniai District Municipality. His brother Algirdas Martinaitis is a composer. Marcelijus Martinaitis graduated septennial school in Gerviniai. Later, he studied in Kaunas Polytechnical School. After the graduation in 1956, he worked as a communications worker, later as an editor in the newspaper Stalinietis of Raseiniai District. Martinaitis graduated from the History and Philology department of Vilnius University in 1964. Afterwards, he worked mostly at various magazines (Jaunimo gretos, Komjaunimo tiesa, etc.). In 1980, he began teaching Lithuanian literature at Vilnius University.

Martinaitis was an active member of the pro-independence Sąjūdis. He was elected to the Supreme Soviet of the Lithuanian SSR in 1989. Later, he was a committee member of the Lithuanian National Prize for Culture and Arts.

== Works ==
The grave of Marcelijus Martinaitis at the Antakalnis cemetery

Martinaitis began publishing his poetry in 1955, and his first poetry book Balandžio sniegas ('April Snow') was published in 1962. Early works were mostly written in social realism style but with the publication of Saulės grąža ('Return of the Sun') in 1969 Martinaitis began to develop his own style. It was a combination of the modern and archaic poetry styles, attention was paid to the perishing agricultural traditions, archaic worldview. One of the most famous his works was a ballad selection Kukučio baladės ('Hoopoe ballads') where Martinaitis employs Kukutis character - a clown, trickster who using his grotesque, ironical way of speaking reveals forbidden trues. For his work Toli nuo rugių ('Far from Rye', 1982) Martinaitis was awarded to the Lithuanian SSR State Prize. Later, after the Lithuanian independence, he wrote chiefly essays, memoirs, published his diaries (Prilenktas prie savo gyvenimo, 'Bended to the Own Life', 1998; Mes gyvenome, 'We Have Lived', 2009).

He also wrote several puppet-plays (Pelenų antelė in 1971, Avinėlio teismas in 1976, Žemės duktė in 1981), edited and published an anthology of Paulius Širvys (Ir nusinešė saulę miškai, 1984), an album dedicated to folk wood-carver Ipolitas Užkurnys. Martinaitis translated poetry of Marina Tsvetayeva, Mārtins Čaklais, Simon Chikovani, Juan Ramón Jiménez, José Martí, Pablo Neruda, Paul-Eerik Rummo, Tomas Tranströmer, among the others. Together with film director Gytis Lukšas, he wrote the script for film Yesterday and Forever.

== Awards ==
- Poetry Spring in 1975
- Lithuanian SSR State Prize in 1984
- Literature Prize of Paulius Širvys in 1995
- Order of the Lithuanian Grand Duke Gediminas (4th degree) in 1995
- Lithuanian National Prize for Culture and Arts in 1998
- Independence Medal in 2000
- Institute of the Lithuanian Literature and the Folklore Prize in 2009
- Literature Prize of Žemaitė in 2010
- Literature Prize of Juozas Paukštelis in 2011
