= Dirgėla =

Dirgėla is the masculine form of a Lithuanian family name. Its feminine forms are: Dirgėlienė (married woman or widow) and Dirgėlaitė (unmarried woman).

The surname may refer to:

- Juozas Dirgėla, Lithuanian association football player
- Kęstutis Dirgėla – Lithuanian engineer, politician
- Petras Dirgėla – Lithuanian writer
- Povilas Dirgėla – Lithuanian writer
