= Žilvinas Kempinas =

Lithuanian visual artist

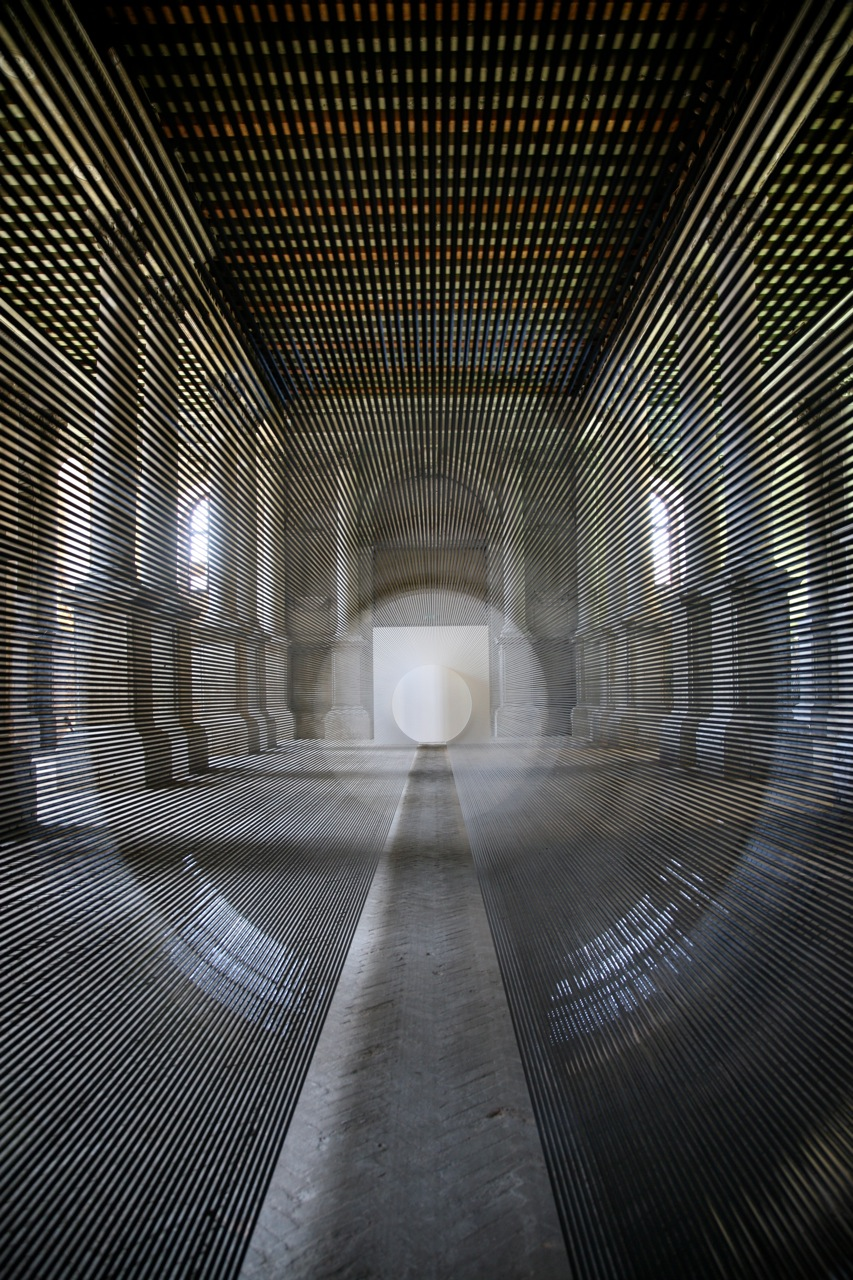
Zilvinas Kempinas, TUBE, Scuola Grande della Misericordia, Lithuanian Pavilion, 53rd Venice Biennale, 2009.

Žilvinas Kempinas (born 1969 in Plungė, Lithuania) is a contemporary visual artist. He lives and works in New York City.

== Biography ==
Žilvinas Kempinas studied at the Vilnius Academy of Arts during the time when Lithuania was one of the first republics to declare sovereignty from the Soviet Union in 1990. He graduated the Academy in 1993. Kempinas exhibited works that merged paintings, sculptures, performance art and installations. He collaborated with Oskaras Koršunovas and created set designs for "The Old Woman 2", "Hello Sonia New Year", "The Flying Dutchman", and "PS Byla OK" which won him the 1998 Kristoforas Award for Best Drama Theater Stage Design.

Kempinas moved to New York at the end of 1997 and received an MFA in combined media from Hunter College, City University of New York in 2002. His first New York show took place at PS1 Contemporary Art Center in 2003. In 2007, Kempinas was featured by Art Review Magazine as one of its 'Future Greats'. In the same year, he was awarded the Calder Prize and a residency at Atelier Calder in Saché, France. In 2008, the artist exhibited at the San Francisco Museum of Modern Art and, in 2009, in a solo show at the Kunsthalle, Vienna. In 2009, Kempinas represented Lithuania at the Venice Biennale 53rd International Art Exhibition in Venice, Italy.

In 2012, Kempinas was awarded the Lithuanian National Prize for Culture and Arts.

== Works ==
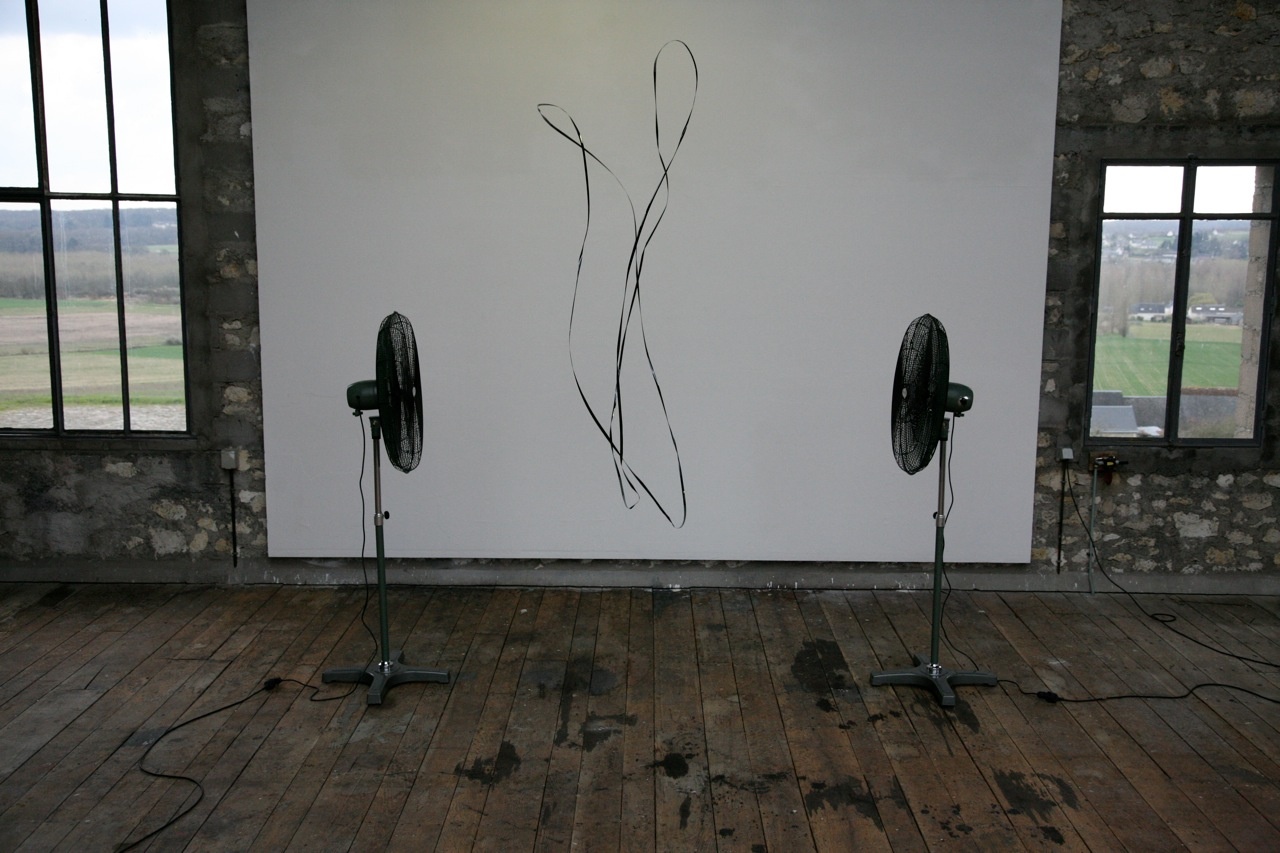
Zilvinas Kempinas, DOUBLE O, 2008, installation view, Atelier Calder, Saché, France.

"Mr. Kempinas has an unusual ability to derive the maximum effects from the slightest of means. It gives his work a resonant economy and, for all its banality, a poetic relationship to the world at large." – Roberta Smith

Kempinas employs nontraditional materials to create active and dynamic exhibits, most commonly as installations. In many of his works, Kempinas utilizes his signature material, unwound magnetic tape. The use of the tape affects the viewer through various senses; visually, aurally and physically. In his work Double O from 2008, he directed two large electric fans at two loops of magnetic tape causing them to seemingly perpetually fly and dance between the fans. At the Venice Biennale 2009, Kempinas presented Tube. Located in the Lithuanian Pavilion at the Scuola Grande della Misericordia, Tube consisted of magnetic tape strung parallel to the ground creating a large translucent tube or tunnel that viewers can walk through. The work addressed the physical and optical experience of the viewer, the passage of time, and the perception of the body and architecture."

“Utilizing industrial fans in his installations to undulate loops of videotape, Žilvinas Kempinas creates gracious gestures in space that are at once minimalistic and yet keenly present. What is most fascinating about Kempinas is not the materials he employs but the transformative experience that his work evokes through its immateriality. In response to the expanse of Calder’s studio and the surrounding hills, Kempinas began working on a much larger scale in Saché. The dimensions of his now famous Tube (2008), a shimmering walkway of magnetic tape that ultimately filled the Lithuanian Pavilion in the 2009 Venice Biennale, was maximally scaled to fit the volume of the Saché studio. Kempinas is the only resident whose work has registered those ideal proportions that Calder designed for himself in 1962. – Alexander S. C. Rower

"I am attracted to things that can transcend their own banality and materiality to become something else -- something more. I am going for something fundamentally natural. Looking at one of my works can, I hope, be like watching a flame or a running river. I want people to forget for a second what they are looking at and inhabit a parallel world, where abstract things make perfect sense as long as you are willing to take the time to look." – Žilvinas Kempinas, interview with Veronica Roberts, Museo Magazine.

== Notable exhibitions ==
- 2019 Zilvinas Kempinas, Liberté! Saison Culturelle 2019, Bordeaux, France
- 2019 Negative Space, ZKM Center for Art and Media, Karlsruhe, Germany
- 2018 Action-Reaction 100 Years of Kinetic Art, Kunsthal Rotterdam, Rotterdam, Netherlands
- 2016 Tube, Kunstraum Dornbirn, Dornbirn, Austria
- 2016 Zilvinas Kempinas, IKON Gallery, Birmingham, United Kingdom
- 2016 Calder Prize, Pace London, London, United Kingdom
- 2016 Sculpture by the Sea: Cottesloe, Cottesloe Beach, Australia
- 2015 The Kaleidoscopic Turn, National Gallery of Victoria, Melbourne, Australia
- 2014 Scarecrow, Socrates Sculpture Park, Long Island City, New York, United States
- 2013 Fountains, Reykjavik Art Museum, Reykjavik, Iceland
- 2013 Darkroom, Kunstsammlung Nordrhein-Westfalen, Düsseldorf, Germany
- 2013 Antigravity, Toyota Municipal Museum of Art, Toyota, Japan
- 2013 Slow Motion, Museum Tinguely, Basel, Switzerland
- 2012 Echigo-Tsumari Art Triennale 2012, Niigata, Japan
- 2011 Exhibition of the permanent collection (from 1960 to present), Centre Georges Pompidou, Paris, France
- 2011 Still, Garage Museum of Contemporary Art, Moscow, Russia
- 2011 Vartai 20 Years: Zilvinas Kempinas, Vartai Gallery, Vilnius, Lithuania
- 2011 Our Magic Hour, Yokohama Triennale, Yokohama, Japan
- 2011 On Line: Drawing Through the Twentieth Century, Museum of Modern Art, New York City, United States
- 2010 Airborne, AV Festival, BALTIC Centre for Contemporary Art, Gateshead Quays, United Kingdom
- 2010 I Believe in Miracles: 10th anniversary of the Lambert Collection, Yvon Lambert Gallery, Avignon, France
- 2009 53rd International Art Exhibition, The Venice Biennale, Venice, Italy
- 2008 Zilvinas Kempinas, Kunsthalle Wien, Vienna, Austria
- 2008 NOW JUMP, Nam June Paik Art Center, Seoul, Korea
- 2008 New Work: Zilvinas Kempinas, Alyson Shotz, Mary Temple, San Francisco Museum of Modern Art, San Francisco, United States
- 2007 Parallels/Flying Tape, Contemporary Art Centre, Vilnius, Lithuania
- 2007 Collected Visions: Modern and Contemporary Works from the JPMorgan Chase Art Collection, Pera Museum, Istanbul, Turkey
- 2006 Flying Tape, Palais de Tokyo, Paris, France
- 2003 Still and 186 000 mi/s, P.S.1 Contemporary Art Center MoMA PS1, New York City, United States

== Selected Collections ==
- Centre Georges Pompidou, Paris, France
- Collection Lambert, Museum of Contemporary Art, Avignon France
- Credit Agricole Art Collection, Paris, France
- JPMorgan Chase Art Collection, New York, United States
- Lewben Art Foundation, Vilnius, Lithuania
- Lio Malca Collection, New York, United States
- Louisiana Museum of Modern Art, Humlebæk, Denmark
- MUDAM Musée d'art Moderne Grand-Duc Jean (The Grand Duke Jean Museum of Modern Art), Luxembourg City, Luxembourg
- Museum of Old and New Art, Tasmania, Australia
- National Gallery of Canada, Ottawa, Canada
- National Gallery of Victoria, Melbourne, Australia
- Queensland Art Gallery & Gallery of Modern Art, Queensland, Australia
- The Margulies Collection at the Warehouse, Miami, United States
