= Degutis =

- Lithuanian surname
- m.: Degutis
- f.: (unmarried): Degutytė
- f.: (married): Degutienė

Degutis is a Lithuanian surname. Notable people with the surname include:

- Arūnas Degutis
- Gražina Degutytė-Švažienė
- Irena Degutienė
- Janina Degutytė
- Darius Degutis
