= Virgilijus Šonta =

Lithuanian photographer

- Born: 16 February 1952; Panevėžys, Lithuanian SSR, Soviet Union
- Died: 22 August 1992 (aged 40); Vilnius, Lithuania
- Known for: Photography

Virgilijus Šonta (16 February 1952 – 22 August 1992) was a Lithuanian photographer.

== Biography ==
Šonta's mother and father were Americans who came to Lithuania before World War II and stayed there. Šonta was a homosexual, but it took him many years to accept his own nature. He tried to "cure" his attraction to men by taking some medications, going into hospitals, and even fasting.

Šonta's first work was the series "Lithuanian Landscapes", and already in 1973, together with Romualdas Požerskis, he opened his first photo exhibition. From a trip to Siberia and the Far East, the photographer produced a series called "Stones of the North". In his "Flight" series, he originally interpreted the myth of Icarus. Šonta filmed a lot of folk artists and artists in various parts of Lithuania. In the early 80s, he was attracted to social themes, and the photographer created his most emotional series "School is my home" about the everyday life of children with psychological disabilities. When the political situation in the Soviet Union began to change, Šonta filmed rallies for the independence of Lithuania. The photographer constantly added pictures from the Lithuanian coast to his characteristic series "Things and Forms." After 1988, Šonta visited the United States four times and took the last series of photographs in his life, "Evening Presentment," in the deserts of Western America.

Šonta once said:

Perhaps I came to this world in the wrong country, in the wrong social environment. Despite this, I believe that there is a country that would correspond to my inner state.

— Virgilijus Šonta

== Exhibitions ==
- 2013. Road to the own land. Solo. Photo gallery "Rachmaninov Garden". Saint Petersburg, Russia
- 2014. Classics of Lithuanian photography. The Lumiere Brothers Center for Photography. Moscow, Russia
- 2018. Tbilisi Photography Festival.
- 2020. Lithuanian photography retrospective. Taras Shevchenko National Museum. Kyiv, Ukraine

== Collections ==
- MO Museum
- San Francisco Museum of Modern Art

== Bibliography ==
- Фотография: Проблемы поэтики [Photography: problems of poetry]. Librocom. Moscow.
