= Vytautas Valius =

Lithuanian painter and graphic designer

Vytautas Valius (24 August 1930 in Telšiai – 28 September 2004 in Vilnius) was a Lithuanian painter and graphic designer.

Valius graduated from the Lithuanian State Art Institute (now Vilnius Academy of Art). He worked in the fields of illustration of prints, paintings and books. From 1965 to 1971, he taught composition at the Vilnius Art Institute.

Valius created a cycle of paintings Lithuanian folk song motives, Historical paraphrases, 20th Century. His wall paintings decorate Hunters' Inn in Kaunas (1974) and Kristijonas Donelaitis reading room at Vilnius University (1979). Valius created decorations for plays, illustrated numerous books of poetry, stories, teaching and scholarly publications. He created the decorations for drama triptych Orator, Maniac, The Prophet Jonah (1967) by Kazys Saja. Valius created mixed media print cycles of 1863 in Lithuania, Planet, Literary paraphrases, Architecture, Musical Theme, Cultural ecology.

Since 1956, he was involved in many international exhibitions (in Germany, Italy, Poland, France, Russia, Norway, USA, Canada). Personal exhibition were held in Vilnius (1967, 1982, 1995–1996, 1997), Kaunas (1982, 1990–1991), Šiauliai (1991), Plungė (1995), Panevėžys, Alytus, Telšiai, Mažeikiai (1996), Toronto (Canada), Chicago (USA) (1988), Detmold (Germany) (1993), Washington, D.C. (Alex Gallery). In 2000, Chodkiewicz Palace and Kaunas Picture Gallery held a retrospective exhibition.

== Awards ==
- 1968 Tallinn Triennial main prize
- 1974 Bonus Norway 2nd International Graphic Exhibition
- 1982 SSR State Prize
- 1996 Lithuanian National Culture and Arts Award for the cycle of paintings and prints Cultural Ecology
