= Sigitas =

- Gender: Male
- Language: Lithuanian

Origin
- Region of origin: Lithuania

Other names
- Related names: Sigita (feminine form)

Sigitas is a Lithuanian masculine given name. Notable people with the name include:

- Sigitas Geda (1943–2008), Lithuanian poet, translator, playwright, essayist, critic and politician
- Sigitas Jakubauskas (born 1958), Lithuanian footballer
- Sigitas Kučinskas (born 1963), Lithuanian rower
- Sigitas Olberkis (born 1997), Lithuanian footballer
- Sigitas Parulskis (born 1965), Lithuanian poet, essayist, playwright and reviewer
- Sigitas Tamkevičius (born 1938), Lithuanian cardinal of the Roman Catholic Church
