= Viktorija Daujotytė =

Lithuanian literary critic and philologist

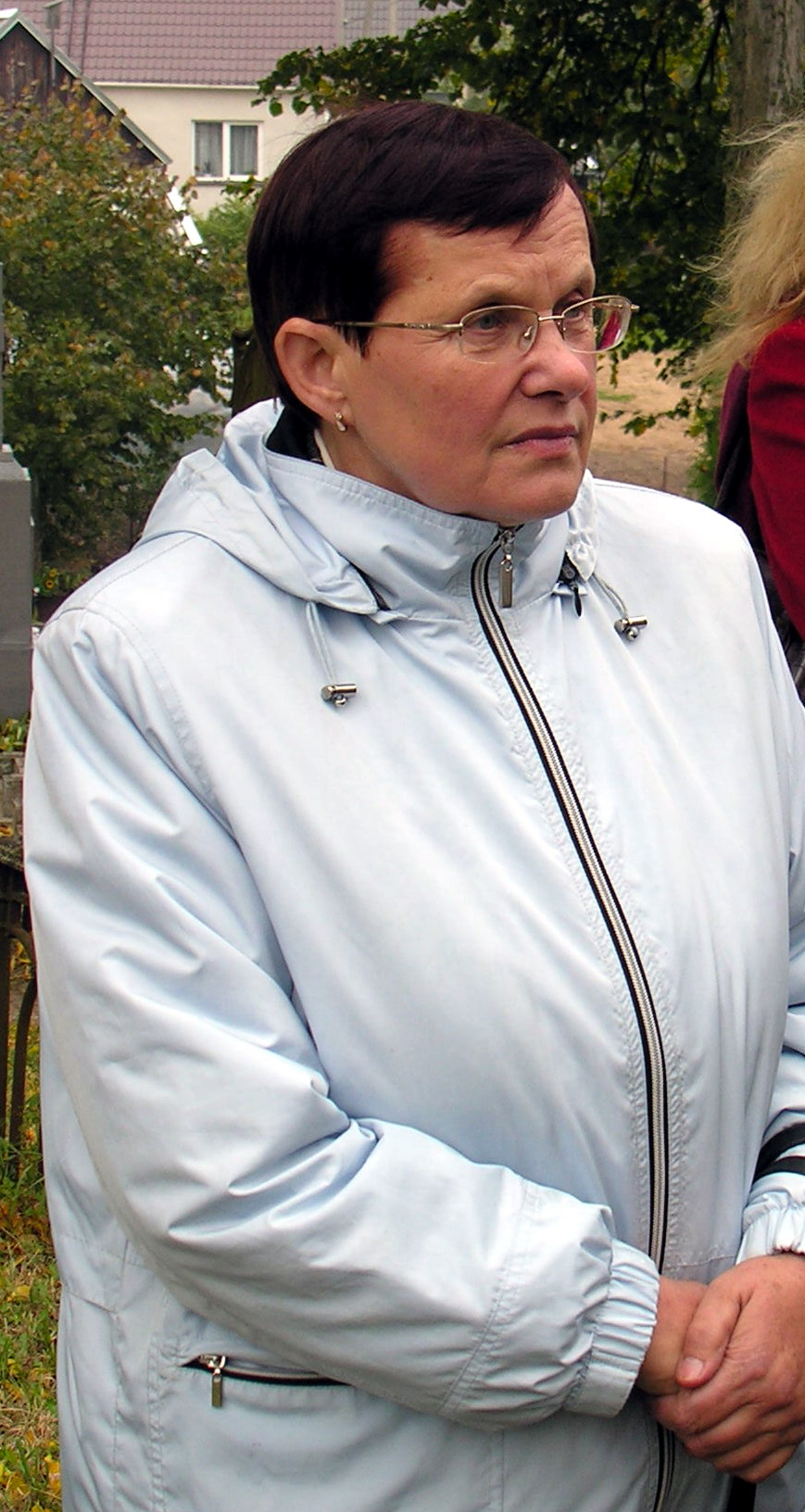

Viktorija Daujotytė-Pakerienė is a Lithuanian literary critic and philologist. She has written more than 30 scientific monographs, as well as essays and Lithuanian language textbooks for general education and higher education. She has also written about culture, feminism, and society.

== Books ==
- Jurgis Baltrušaitis: (monografija). Vilnius, 1974.
- Lyrikos teorijos pradmenys (mokymo priemonė aukštosioms mokykloms). 1984.
- Lietuvių filosofinė lyrika. Vilnius, 1977.
- Kas tu esi, eilėrašti? Vilnius: Vaga, 1980.
- Юргис Балтрушайтис: монографический очерк. Вильнюс: Vaga, 1983.
- Janina Degutytė (monografinė apybraiža). Vilnius: Vaga, 1984.
- Lyrikos būtis. Vilnius: Vaga, 1987.
- Lietuvių eilėraštis proza. 1987.
- Vinco Mykolaičio-Putino lyrika. Vilnius, 1988.
- Tautos žodžio lemtys. XIX amžius. Vilnius, 1990.
- Moteriškosios literatūros epistema. 1991.
- Moters dalis ir dalia. Vilnius, 1992.
- Su Jurgiu Baltrušaičiu. Vilnius: Regnum, 1994.
- Salomėjos Nėries ruduo. 1995.
- Lyrika mokykloje. 1995.
- Janina Degutytė. Atsakymai. 1996.
- Kalbos kalbėjimas. Vilnius: Regnum, 1997.
- Šatrijos Raganos pasaulyje: gyvenimo ir kūrinių skaitymai. Vilnius: Lietuvos rašytojų sąjungos leidykla, 1997.
- Trys sakiniai. Kaunas: Šviesa, 1997.
- Tekstas ir kūrinys. Vilnius: Kultūra, 1998.
- Prilenktas prie savo gyvenimo. 1998.
- Salomėja Nėris: gyvenimo ir kūrybos skaitymai. Kaunas: Šviesa, 1999 (Gyvenimas ir kūryba; 43)
- Kultūros šalys ir nuošalės. Vilnius, 2000.
- Literatūros filosofija. Vilnius, 2001.
- Parašyta moterų. Vilnius, 2001.
- Sakiniai: esė. Vilnius: Tyto alba, 2002.
- Literatūros fenomenologija. Problematikos kontūrai. 2003.
- Raštai ir paraštės. Apie Justino Marcinkevičiaus kūrybą. 2003.
- Salomėja Nėris: fragmento poetika. Vilnius: Lietuvos rašytojų sąjungos leidykla, 2004.
- Mažoji lyrikos teorija. Vilnius: Mokslo ir enciklopedijų leidybos institutas, 2005.
- Perrašai: eiliuoti tekstai. Vilnius: Vilniaus dailės akademijos leidykla, 2005.
- Žmogus ir jo kalnas: apie monsinjorą Kazimierą Vasiliauską: asmenybės fenomenologija. Vilnius: Lietuvos rašytojų sąjungos leidykla, 2005.

== Awards and decorations ==
Recipient of various national awards, including:

- 1993: Lithuanian National Prize
- 2002: Commander's Cross of the Order of the Lithuanian Grand Duke Gediminas
- 2007: Constitution Cup
- 2009: National Provgress Prize
- 2015 Antanas Baranauskas literary prize
