= Birutė Žilytė-Steponavičienė =

Lithuanian graphic artist and book illustrator (1930–2024)

Birutė Janina Grasilda Žilytė-Steponavičienė (2 June 1930 – 3 November 2024) was a Lithuanian graphic artist, book illustrator, painter, and educator.

== Biography ==
Žilytė-Steponavičienė was born in Nainiškiai, Panevėžys District on 2 June 1930. In 1956 she graduated from State Institute of Art (now Vilnius Academy of Arts). From 1963 to 1987 she taught at the Čiurlionis School of Art.

She was married to Algirdas Steponavičius, painter, graphic artist, book illustrator and writer.

Žilytė-Steponavičienė died on 3 November 2024, at the age of 94.

== Notable works ==
=== Pušelė sanatorium murals ===
In 2015 the murals in Valkininkai children's sanatorium "Pušelė" ("Little Pine Tree"), created together with her husband during 1969–1972, were included into the Lithuanian Registry of Cultural Values. On the occasion, the head of the regional Cultural Heritage department Margarita Janušonienė noticed that it is an important example of the cooperation of a duo of complementary artists and the consolidation of creative freedom against Soviet censorship and the regulation of art in public spaces. The murals, based on the motifs of Lithuanian folklore, are described as "one of the most remarkable works of Lithuanian modernist art of the second half of the 20th century". The original work is in a vandalized and neglected state. A digitally restored copy, based on photographs made in 2016-2018 was prepared by the Vilnius Gallery project, with the assistance of the artist. The reconstructed copy was printed on aluminium composite sheets, for exhibitions.

The mural paintings constitute 12 compositions of total area of about 110 m².

=== Book illustrations ===
In 1969 Birutė Žilytė was awarded the Golden Apple award at the Bratislava Children's Book Illustration Biennale for her illustrations for the 1967 edition of the poetry book Aukso sietelis (The Golden Sieve) by Janis Rainis.

Her illustrations for Aldona Liobytė's Pabėgusi dainelė (Runaway Song, 1966) and Pasaka apie narsią Vilniaus mergaitę ir galvažudį Žaliabarzdį (The Tale of a Brave Girl from Vilnius and Greenbeard the Killer, 1970) earned her the Lithuanian SSR State Award (1971).

== Awards and decorations ==
- 1971: Lithuanian SSR State Award
- 1997: Knight's Cross of the Order of the Lithuanian Grand Duke Gediminas
- 1980. Meritorious Artist of Lithuanian SSR
- 2010: Culture and Arts Award of the Government of the Republic of Lithuania
- 2015: Lithuanian National Prize for Culture and Arts, "for art and creativity for children that fosters high modern culture."
- 2020: Honorary Professor at the Vilnius Academy of Arts
