= Jonas Aleksa =

Jonas Aleksa might refer to:

- Jonas Dainius Aleksa (1939–2005), Lithuanian conductor, recipient of the Lithuanian National Prize for Culture and Arts
- Jonas Pranas Aleksa (1879–1952), Lithuanian politician, Minister of Agriculture
