= Čigriejus =

- Lithuanian surname
- m.: Čigriejus
- f.: (unmarried): Čigriejūtė
- f.: (married): Čigriejienė

Čigriejus is a Lithuanian-language surname. "Chigrey" or "Chegrey" may be a corruption of the Turkic name Shah-Giray (Шахгирей) or Şahin Giray. Also, there is a community Chegerey of abazins. The Russian-language equivalents are is "Chigrey"/"Chegrey" (Чигрей/Чегрей).

Notable people with the surname include:

- Henrikas Čigriejus, Lithuanian writer
- Vida Marija Čigriejienė (born1936), Lithuanian physician, politician and professor
