= Grigorijus Kanovičius =

Jewish writer (1929–2023)

Grigory Kanovich (also Grigorijus Kanovičius; 18 June 1929 – 20 January 2023) was a Lithuanian Jewish writer and the winner of the Lithuanian National Prize for Culture and Arts for 2014.

Kanovich was born into a traditional Jewish family in the Lithuanian town of Jonava on 18 June 1929. At the age of twelve, with the outbreak of the Second World War on the Eastern Front, Kanovich became a refugee, fleeing with his parents through Latvia to Russia, where the family spent the rest of the war. He returned to Lithuania after the war and settled in Vilnius, where he studied at Vilnius University.

In 1955 Kanovich launched his literary career, publishing a volume of verse, 'Good Morning', followed in 1960 by 'Spring Thunder'. However, he soon turned his attention to prose and to writing for the stage and film. He wrote a number of successful screenplays, including working on 'Ava Vita' with Vytautas Žalakevičius.

Kanovich wrote more than ten novels, among them, trilogy Candles in the Wind and novels Fools’ Tears and Prayers, Smile Upon Us, Lord, A Kid for Two Pennies, There is No Paradise for Slaves, Don’t Turn your Face from Death, The Jewish Park, The Rustle of Fallen Trees, The Devil’s Spell and Shtetl Love Song which won Book of the Year in Lithuania.

Kanovich was the recipient of the Medal of the Order of the Lithuanian Grand Duke Gediminas and Grand Cross of Commander of the Order for Merits to Lithuania. He was declared a Citizen of Honor (2013) of his hometown Jonava. Between 1989 and 1993, Kanovich served as Chairman of the Jewish Community of Lithuania.

The writer lived in Israel from 1993 up until his death. He was a member of the PEN International club in both Israel and Russia.

Kanovich was married and had two sons – Dmitry and Sergey. Most of his novels were edited by his wife Olga.

== Books ==
- Shtetl Love Song
- Devilspel
- The Tears and Prayers of Fools
