= Jeronimas Kačinskas =

American classical composer

Jeronimas Kačinskas (or Kacinskas; 17 April 1907 – 15 September 2005) was a Lithuanian-born American composer.

Kačinskas was born in Viduklė, Kovno Governorate, Russian Empire, to the family of a church organist. He studied music at the National Conservatory of Lithuania in Klaipėda and at the Prague Conservatory. He later taught at the State Conservatory in Vilnius. His Nonet was premiered in London in 1938, and he married Elena Šlevaitė in 1941. In 1944, they escaped from Lithuania and travelled through Poland into Germany, where they were finally rescued by American troops.

In 1949, they arrived in the United States, and Kačinskas became a church organist and choirmaster in Boston, Massachusetts. From 1967 to 1986, he taught at Berklee College of Music.

In 1991 he was awarded Lithuanian National Prize.

== Works ==
Opera

- Juodas laivas (Black Ship) (1975); libretto by Algirdas Landsbergis

Orchestral

- Symphonic Fantasy No.1 (1940)
- Giesmė į šviesą (Hymn to Light), Symphonic Poem (1947)
- Atpirkimo misterija (Mystery of Redemption), Symphonic Poem (1956)
- Lento, Symphonic Poem (1957)
- Vilniaus siuita (Vilnius Suite) (1960)
- Symphonic Fantasy No.2 (1960)
- Transcendentinės išraiškos (Transcendental Expressions) for wind orchestra and organ (1964)
- Penki koncertiniai etiudai (Five Concert Etudes) for string orchestra (1989)

Concertante

- Concerto for trumpet and orchestra (1931)
- Concerto for flute and string orchestra (1962)

Chamber music

- String Quartet No.1 (1930)
- String Quartet No.2 (1931)
- Nonet for flute, oboe, clarinet, bassoon, horn, violin, viola, cello and double bass (1932)
- Trio No.1 for trumpet, viola and piano (1933)
- Trio No.2 Keturios miniatiūros (Four Miniatures) for flute, clarinet and cello (1958)
- Septet for clarinet, bassoon, horn, violin, viola, cello and piano (1959)
- Wind Quintet (1961)
- Saxophone Quartet No.1 (1967)
- Sonata for violin and piano (1974)
- Saxophone Quartet No.2 (1975)
- Introduction and Toccata for violin (1977)
- Trys liaudies dainos (Three Folk Songs) for clarinet, string quartet and piano (1977)
- Piano Quintet (1978)
- Lietuvoje (In Lithuania) for flute, violin, viola and cello (1980)
- Trio No.3 "Lietuviškas trio" (Lithuanian Trio) for flute, clarinet and viola (1980)
- Kamerinė fantazija (Chamber Fantasy) for flute, string quartet and piano (1981)
- Procesinė muzika (Processional Music) for 3 trumpets and organ (1982)
- Trio No.4 Lietuviška siuita (Lithuanian Suite) for flute, clarinet and bassoon (1983)
- Suite No.1 (Trio No.5) for flute, clarinet and bassoon (1985)
- Suite No.2 (Trio No.6) for violin, cello and piano (1986)
- Trio No.7 for violin, cello and piano (1987)
- Duo for violin and cello (1990)
- Variations for clarinet and piano (1991)
- String Quartet No.3 (1993)
- String Quartet No.4 (1997)
- 2000 Year Anniversary of Jesus Christ's Holy Message to the People for horn, 3 trumpets, 3 trombones and tuba (2000)

Organ

- Improvisation (1968)
- Trumpa fantazija (Short Fantasy) (1969)
- Kontrastai (Contrasts) (1970)

Piano

- Variations (1929)
- Atspindžiai (Reflections) (1957)

Vocal

- Kaip aš buvau, sadulia (When I Was) for voice and piano
- Vai, lazdynai (Nut, Trees) for voice and piano
- Kad jau saulutė (The Sun Is Up) for voice and piano
- Tėviškės medžiai (Trees of Homeland) for voice and piano (1953); words by Kazys Bradūnas
- Audra (Storm) for voice and piano (1958); words by Pranas Lembertas
- Laivai palaužtom burėm (Boats with Broken Sails) for voice and piano or orchestra (1958); words by Stasys Santvaras
- Giesmė (Hymn) for baritone and piano (1960); words by Stasys Santvaras
- Lietuvos karalienė (Queen of Lithuania) for voice and piano (1965); words by E. Tumienė
- Aušra (Dawn) for voice and orchestra (1968); words by Kazys Bradūnas
- Nerimas (Anxiety) for voice and orchestra (1968); words by Leonas Andriekus
- Triptikas (Triptych) for soprano and orchestra (1968)
- Paslaptis (Mystery) for voice and piano or orchestra (1968); words by Kotryna Grigaitytė
- Trys liaudies dainos (Three Folk Songs) for voice and piano (1977)
- Nėra šalies tokios (No Such Land) for voice and piano (1980); words by Jonas Rūtenis
- Išjos sūnus (Son Will Ride Away) for voice, flute, 3 horns and piano (1987)
- Trys dainos (Three Songs) for voice and piano (1989)
- Rūpintojėlis (Sad God) for voice and piano (1991)
- Kur tavo dainos (Where Are Your Songs) for voice and piano (1994); words by Kazys Binkis
- Prabilkit stygos (Speak Up, Strings) for voice and piano (1996); words by Jurgis Tilvytis

Choral

- O, siela žmogaus (Oh, Soul of Man) for male chorus and organ; liturgical text
- Neapleisk mūsų (Do Not Abandon Us) for soprano and male chorus; liturgical text
- Malda (Prayer) for soprano, male chorus and organ; words by Stasys Liepas
- Marija (Maria) for mixed chorus; words by Pranas Lembertas
- Vargonai, gauskit (Organ, Play) for mixed chorus; liturgical text
- Mergele, Motin (Virgin, Mother) for mixed or male chorus; liturgical text
- O, Šventas Karalaiti (Oh, Blessed King) for soprano and male chorus; liturgical text
- Nebūk mums, Viešpatie, rūstus (Lord, Be Not Angry With Us) for male chorus; liturgical text
- Ave Maria for mixed or male chorus; liturgical text
- Rex Christe for mixed or female chorus; liturgical text
- Confirma Hoc for mixed or male chorus; liturgical text
- Šventa naktis (Holy Night) for mixed or male chorus; liturgical text
- Tykiai tykiai Nemunėlis teka (Quietly Flows the Nemunas River) for male chorus (1928)
- Sanctus for male chorus (1928); liturgical text
- Kur aš pasidėsiu (Where Will I Go) for mixed chorus (1928)
- Vilks papjovė (The Wolf Did It In) for mixed chorus (1928)
- Keleliu jojau (Riding on the Path) for male chorus (1928)
- Ant lygumėlio (On the Flat) for male chorus (1928)
- Rex for bass solo and male chorus (1928); words by Vincas Mykolaitis-Putinas
- Sutems tamsi naktužėlė (Dark Night Will Fall) for mixed chorus (1928)
- Varnas (The Raven) for mixed chorus (1929); words by Vincas Mykolaitis-Putinas
- Beržas (Birch Tree) for mixed chorus (1931); words by Juozas Tysliava
- Per girias (Through the Woods) for mixed chorus (1931); words by Balys Sruoga
- Pjovėjas (The Reaper) for mixed chorus (1931); words by Balys Sruoga
- Terra tremuit, Easter Hymn for mixed chorus or mixed chorus and organ (1932); liturgical text
- Ant temstančio tako (On the Darkening Path) for mixed chorus (1936)
- Gandrai (Storks) for mixed chorus (1938)
- Vinkšna (Elm Tree) for mixed chorus (1938)
- Daina (Song) for mixed chorus (1938)
- Oi, ūžė (The Murmur Came) for male chorus (1939)
- Nemunui (For the Nemunas River) for male chorus (1942)
- Missa brevis for male chorus (1945); liturgical text
- Lietuvos takeliai (Lithuanian Pathways) for mixed chorus (1946); words by Jurgis Baltrušaitis
- Esi, dangau (You Are, Heaven) for mixed chorus (1946); words by Bernardas Brazdžionis
- Žvangučiai (Bellflowers) for mixed chorus (1947); words by Jonas Aistis
- Suskambėjo (The Lyre Rang Out) for mixed or female chorus (1947); words by Motiejus Gustaitis
- Jau saulutė leidžias (The Sun Is Setting) for mixed chorus (1947)
- Didis, galingas (Great and Mighty) for mixed chorus (1948)
- Gimimo giesmė (Nativity Hymn) for mixed chorus (1950); words by Stasys Santvaras
- Missa in Honorem Immaculati Cordis Beate Mariae Virginis for soprano, alto, tenor and bass soli, mixed chorus, 3 trumpets, 3 trombones, tuba and organ (1951); liturgical text
- Kelionės daina (Travel Song) for female chorus (1953); Alfonsas Nyka-Niliūnas
- Rauda (Lament) for mixed chorus (1960); words by Jonas Aistis
- Te Deum laudamus for soprano, tenor, mixed chorus and organ (1965); liturgical text
- Šv. Stepono mišios (St. Stephen's Mass) for mixed chorus and organ (1966); liturgical text
- Gintarėlis (Little Amber) for mixed chorus (1968); words by Leonardas Andriekus
- Te lucis ante for mixed chorus and piano (or organ) (1977); liturgical text
- Oi, tai buvo (Oh, What Happened) for mixed chorus (1981)
- Haec Dies for mixed chorus and organ (or piano) (1981); liturgical text
- Haec Dies for mixed chorus, horn, 2 trumpets, 3 trombones, timpani and organ (1981); liturgical text
- Haec Dies for mixed chorus (1981); liturgical text
- Saulės giesmė (Hymn of the Sun) for baritone, mixed chorus and organ or orchestra (1982); words by St. Francis of Assisi
- Deus qui inter for mixed chorus and organ or 2 horns, 2 trumpets and trombone (1983); liturgical text
- Ateities giesmė (Hymn of the Future) for soprano, bass, mixed chorus and piano or orchestra (1986); words by Bernardas Brazdžionis
- Vidurnakčio tyla (Midnight Silence) for male chorus (1991); words by Jonas Aistis
- Baltija (The Baltic Sea) for mixed chorus and orchestra (1993); words by Paulius Jurkus
- Asperges me for mixed chorus and organ (1993); liturgical text
- Mišios Šventosios Dvasios garbei (Mass in Honour of Holy Spirit), Missa brevis for mixed chorus and organ (1995); liturgical text
- Mišios Švenčiausios Jėzaus Širdies garbei (Mass in Honour of Jesus' Holy Heart), Missa brevis for male chorus and organ (1996); liturgical text
- Credo for mixed chorus, 2 trumpets, 2 trombones and organ (1999); liturgical text
- Credo for mixed chorus (1999); liturgical text
- Jesu Dulcis for mixed chorus (2001); liturgical text
