= Rytis Mažulis =

Rytis Mažulis (born 23 February 1961 in Šiauliai) is one of the most significant and distinctive Lithuanian composers, representing the extreme minimalist trend in Lithuanian music.

== Life ==
In 1983 Rytis Mažulis graduated from Julius Juzeliūnas's composition class at the Lithuanian Academy of Music. In 1988 he won with the "Tyla" Prize for his chamber piece "The Sleep", and in 1989 he was awarded the Lithuanian Culture Fund Prize for chamber and vocal music. Mažulis received a scholarship from the Akademie Schloss Solitude, Stuttgart, for the period from September 1998 to April 1999. He was twice awarded the prize for the best vocal composition ("ajapajapam", 2002; "Form Is Emptiness", 2006) at the competition organized by the Lithuanian Composers' Union. In 2004 he was awarded the Lithuanian National Prize. In 2006 Rytis Mažulis was appointed Head of the Composition Department of the Lithuanian Academy of Music and Theatre.

Works by Mažulis are frequently performed at festivals throughout Europe: Nyyd (Tallinn, 1991), Musikhøst (Odense, 1992), Deutschlandfunk (Cologne, 1992), Prague Spring (1995), Norrtelje Chamber Music Festival (1995), De Suite Muziekweek (Amsterdam, 1995), Minimalisms (Berlin, 1998), Klang Raum (Stuttgart, 1998), 53. Arbeitstagung von Institut für neue Musik und Musikerziehung (Darmstadt, 1999), MaerzMusik (Berlin, 2003), Melos-Ethos (Bratislava, 2005), Huddersfield Contemporary Music Festival (2006, 2007), Images Sonores (Liege, 2007), ISCM World Music Days (Vilnius, 2008), as well as at concerts in Warsaw, Gdansk, Düsseldorf, Akademie Schloss Solitude in Stuttgart (1994, 1999), Queen Elizabeth Hall in London (1995).

Rytis Mažulis' works are stylistically pure, frequently using canonical techniques and concentric forms. Because these composition techniques need the right instrumentation to make a homogeneous and crystal-clear sound, Mažulis usually writes for ensembles of equal voices or for all keyboard instruments. These pieces are either performed live or when his music is impossible to perform with conventional instruments- realized with computer, treated as a kind of super-piano. For example, in his piece "Palindrome" there are micro-tonal pitch gradations, non-standard divisions of rhythmic values and the simultaneous pulsing of different tempos. His "Clavier of Pure Reason" also cannot easily be performed live, but for a different reason: it needs an ensemble of at least 24 pianos. Mažulis's works are not just stylistically pure, they also show a subtle sense of humor.
