= Rimantas Sakalauskas =

Lithuanian sculptor

Rimantas Sakalauskas (born 1951 in Šiauliai) is a Lithuanian sculptor and a recipient of the Lithuanian National Prize.

Most of Sakalauskas' works are located in cemeteries and churches. Solo exhibitions of his work have been held in the Kretinga Museum, at a private gallery in Israel, and at the Lithuanian Ministry of Foreign Affairs. His work has also been exhibited in Latvia, Estonia, Sweden, and Germany. Many of his works have been commissioned by the Franciscan Order, including works at the Vilnius Bernadine Church, the Chapel of the Holy Stairs at the Bernardine Church, and the pulpit at the monastery of the Hill of Crosses.

His sculptures have been variously described as simple, organic, and complex and sophisticated - but also as defying categorization. Sakalauskas avoids publicity and seldom participates in exhibitions.
