= Eglė Špokaitė =

Lithuanian ballet dancer

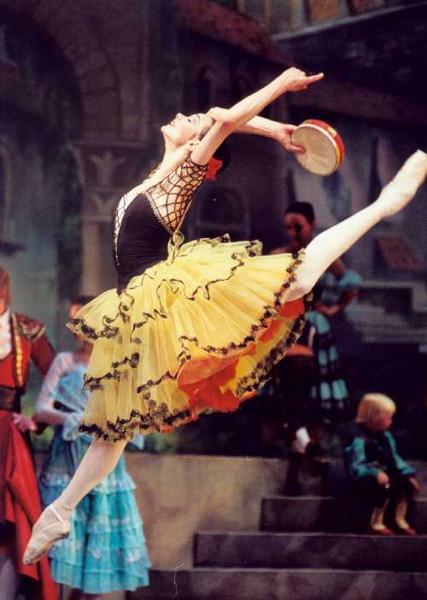
- Eglė Špokaitė in the role of Kitri
- Born: 15 January 1971 (age 55); Vilnius, Lithuania
- Education: Vilnius School of Ballet
- Occupation: Artistic director
- Website: balletinstitutesd.com

Eglė Špokaitė (born 1971) is a Lithuanian ballet dancer, most notably a Principal Ballerina for the Lithuanian National Opera and Ballet Theatre (1989–2011). She co-founded the Egle Špokaitė Ballet School in Vilnius, Lithuania (2008), where she also served as artistic director. In the United States, she founded the Ballet Institute of San Diego dance school (2016). Špokaitė is also a choreographer, actress, and public speaker. She's the winner of the Lithuanian National Prize, as well as numerous other awards and honors. She lives and works between San Diego, CA and Vilnius.

== Career ==
Eglė Špokaitė was born in 1971 in Vilnius. After graduating from Vilnius School of Ballet in 1989, she became the soloist for the Lithuanian National Opera and Ballet Theatre performing roles including Giselle in "Giselle," Juliet in "Romeo & Juliet," and Kitri in "Don Quixote." Between 1994 and 1996 Špokaitė participated and won four international ballet competitions.

=== Ballet Dancer ===
Her professional ballet career began in 1989 at the Lithuanian National Opera and Ballet Theatre, where she collaborated with internationally renowned ballet masters, educators and choreographers. Some notable collaborations include "Romeo & Juliet" with Mstislav Rostropovich in which the Russian conductor called Špokaitė's Juliet his favorite interpretation of the role. She was also mentored by Maya Plisetskaya, a Soviet dancer and choreographer who collaborated with Špokaitė on a variety of projects and performances.

Other creative collaborators and mentors include: L.Shulga, Jonas Katakinas. She performed classical roles with leading Russian ballet educators Ninel Kurgapkina and Kseniya Ter-Stepanova. Eglė collaborated with the most prominent of art figures: Mstislav Rostropovich, Maya Pliseckaya, Gidon Kremer, Eimuntas Nekrosius. She performed under the direction of choreographers Giorgi Aleksidze, Krzysztof Pastor, Boris Eifman, Alexei Ratmansky, Gerald Arpino, Alla Sigalova, E.Vicichovska, K.Simonov. As a visiting artist created major roles in Georgian National Opera, Latvian National Opera, Finnish National Opera, Karellian Music Theater. She was a member of the company until 2011.

=== Ballet Educator ===
In 2008 Egle co-founded Egle Spokaite Ballet School (2008–2018), the largest private ballet school in the Baltic region with an enrollment of more than 700 students. In 2015, she co-founded the international Vilnius Youth Ballet Competition, an event dedicated to discovering up-and-coming talents from around Europe. By 2017, the competition drew over 200 soloists, ranging in ages 6 to 12 and coming from number of European countries. (See the Vilnius Youth Ballet Competition on YouTube.)

In 2016 Spokaite relocated to San Diego, CA, where she established the Ballet Institute of San Diego.

=== Choreographer ===
In 2011 Egle Spokaite left the stage of Lithuanian National Opera and Ballet Theater. March 2015 marked her debut as a choreographer: ballet "The Blue Danube" premiered at Kaunas National Musical Theater, choreographed and libretto edited by Egle.

=== Actress ===
In 2000 she ventured into acting, playing Desdemona in a stage production of Shakespeare's Othello directed by the Lithuanian director Eimuntas Nekrosius. Egle traveled the world for over a decade after the world premiere of the performance took place at the Venice Biennale 2001. La Biennale di Venezia was one of the co-producers of this play.

== Roles ==
Ballet:

- Giselle in "Giselle". Choreography and staging O. Vinogradov, 1985 m.
- Juliet in Romeo and Juliet. Choreography by V. Vassilev, music by Sergei Prokofiev, (1993)
- Kitri and Mercedes in "Don Quixote". Libretto by M. Petipa; choreography by M. Petipa, V. Vasilev (1994)
- Aurora in "The Sleeping Beauty". Libretto by M. Petipa and I. Vsevololozhski; choreography by M. Petipa (1996)
- Marie in "The Nutcracker". Choreography and staging by Andrei Melanin (1996)
- Carmen in "Carmen". Choreography by K. Pastor
- Hippolyta in "A Midsummer Night's Dream". Choreography and libretto by K. Pastor (1998)
- Marina in "Zorba the Greek". Libretto and choreography by L. Massine (1998)
- Ballerina in "Red Giselle". Choreography and libretto by Boris Eifman (2001)
- The Empress in "Russian Hamlet". Choreography and libretto by Boris Eifman (2003)
- Odette-Odile in "Swan Lake". Choreography by M. Petipa and L. Ivanov (2004)
- Desdemona in "Desdemona". Choreography by Kiril Simonov (2005)
- Anna Karenina in "Anna Karenina". Choreography by A. Ratmansky (2005)
- Sacrifice in "The Rite of Spring". (2006)
- Juliet in "Romeo and Juliet". Choreography by Kiril Simonov (2009)
- Olympia in "Copellia". Choreography by Kiril Simonov (2010)

Theater:

- Desdemona in W. Shakespeare's "Othello". Director Eimuntas Nekrosius, (Meno Fortas, 2000)

== Choreography ==
- "The Blue Danube" to the music of J. Strauss II, at Kaunas National Music Theater (2015)

== Filmography ==
- W. Shakespeare's "Othello", directed by Eimuntas Nekrosius – filmed in Vilnius Russian Drama Theater (2005)
- Russian Hamlet, choreography and libretto by Boris Eifman (2006)

== Awards and honors ==
- First prize, Helsinki International Ballet Competition (1995)
- First prize (Gold Medal), Nagoya International competition (Japan, 1996)
- 4th class Order of the Lithuanian Grand Duke Gediminas (1996)
- Lithuanian National Prize - highest honor in Lithuania (1996)
- "Operos Svyturiai" National Award in the category of "Female Ballet Soloist of the Year" (Vilnius, Lithuania, 2002)
- "Operos Svyturiai" National Award in the category of "Female Ballet Soloist of the Year" (Vilnius, Lithuania, 2003)
- Ballet Soloists' Audience Award, (Vilnius, 2003)
- Golden Stage Cross (highest prize for the performing arts in Lithuania) for the outstanding achievements in ballet and dance (Vilnius, Lithuania, 2003)
- Golden Stage Cross for the outstanding achievements in ballet and dance (Vilnius, Lithuania, 2006)
- The grant of the International Maya Plisetskaya and Rodion Shchedrin Foundation for the lifelong dedication to the art of ballet.
- Golden Stage Cross for the role of Olympia in the Leo Delibes "Coppelia", (2011)

== Personal life ==
Eglė Špokaitė is married to scientist and photographer Dainius Macikenas and lives between San Diego, US and Vilnius, Lithuania.
