= Icchokas Meras =

Lithuanian writer (1934–2014)

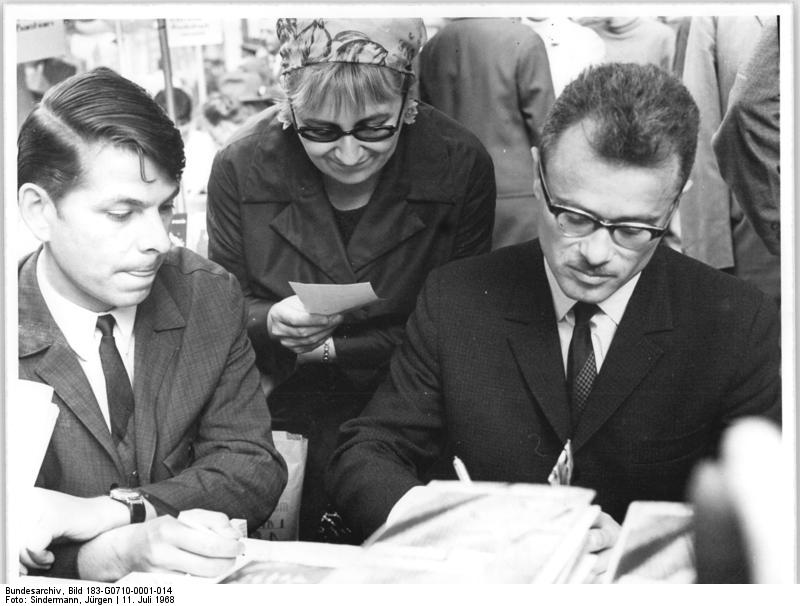
Icchokas Meras (on the right) in 1968

Icchokas Meras (8 October 1934 – 13 March 2014) was a Lithuanian writer.

== Biography ==
Meras was born in 1934 to Jehuda and Miriam Meras in a Jewish family in Kelmė, Lithuania, which contained one of the country's notable Jewish communities. His family perished in 1941 when the Nazis undertook the liquidation of Lithuania's Jews, but young Icchokas escaped the Holocaust. "On July 28, 1941, I was being taken to a ditch to be shot," he wrote later. "Due to chance, they decided to return some of the children. Due to another chance, I fell in with people who valued the life of a seven-year old child."

Hidden and adopted by a Lithuanian peasant family, Meras survived the war. In the violent and troubled post-war years Meras attended secondary school and soon revealed an inclination towards writing when he came to work for a local newspaper in Kelmė.

In 1958 he graduated from the Kaunas Polytechnic Institute with a degree in radio electronics, but began devoting most of his spare time to literature. In 1960 Meras published his first collection of stories entitled Geltonas lopas (The Yellow Patch). He based his sketches on his own childhood experiences of Holocaust terror. In 1963 Meras published two works: Žemė visada gyva (The Earth is Always Alive) and his best-known work internationally, Lygiosios trunka akimirką (A Stalemate Lasts But a Moment). In 1965 Meras published another novel, Ant ko laikosi pasaulis (What the World Rests On). In 1971 there followed Mėnulio savaitė (The Week of the Moon) and Senas fontanas (The Old Fountain). In 1971 Meras presented his darkly existentialist novel Striptizas, arba Paryžius — Roma — Paryžius (Striptease or Paris-Rome-Paris). This work was published in literary monthly magazine Pergalė and was roundly criticised by Communist party officials.

Under increasing pressure from the KGB authorities for his literary "deviations," he emigrated from Lithuania to Israel in 1972 where he lived until his death.

== Awards and recognition ==
- Lithuania: Lithuanian National Prize (2010).
- Lithuania: Commander's Cross of the Order of Gediminas (1995)
