= Gintaras Sodeika =

Lithuanian painter, composer and politician (born 1961)

- Born: 27 April 1961 (age 65); Vilnius, Lithuania
- Education: J. Tallat-Kelpša Higher Music School; Lithuanian State Conservatory
- Occupations: Painter; composer; politician
- Children: 2
- Awards: St. Christopher Award (1998); Golden Stage Cross (2006)

Gintaras Sodeika (born 27 April 1961 in Vilnius, Lithuania) is a Lithuanian painter, composer and politician.

From 2003 to 2008, Sodeika was the Lithuanian Vice-Minister for Culture.

== Early life and education ==
In 1976, he graduated from the 31st Secondary School in Vilnius. In 1980, he graduated from the J. Tallat-Kelpša Higher Music School in Vilnius with a specialty in choral conducting. In 1986, he graduated from the Lithuanian State Conservatory, where he studied composition under Julius Juzeliūnas.

He was influenced early on by the Fluxus movement.

== Career ==
=== Professional and political positions ===
From 1999 to 2003, he was Chairman of the Lithuanian Composers' Union. During the periods 2003–2005 and 2006–2008, he served as Lithuania's Deputy Minister of Culture. From 2000 to 2006, he was President of the Lithuanian Association of Copyright Protection and Head of the Electronic Music Studio at the Lithuanian Academy of Music. From 2008 to 2010, he was the Deputy Head of Vilnius County, and from 2010 to 2012, he was Assistant to the Minister for the Interior. In 2012, he began working as cultural adviser to Artūras Zuokas, the mayor of Vilnius. Since 2014, he has been the Director of the Jonas Mekas Visual Arts Center.

=== Artistic works and collaborations ===
He is a member of the artists' group called Green Leaves and has performed under its auspices. In 1988–90, he arranged three music festivals: AN-88 and AN-89 (in the town of Anykščiai) and NI-90 (in the town of Nida).

Since 1990, he has composed music for almost all of the productions of the theatre director Oskaras Koršunovas. He has also been the sound designer for various non-traditional performance works. He wrote the music for documentary director Arūnas Matelis's film Flight over Lithuania (2000).

=== Membership ===
Since 2006, he has been a member of the Liberal and Centre Union, a conservative-liberal political party.

== Personal life ==
He and his wife, Rimantė, have two children: Vainius and Joris.

== Honors and awards ==
In 1998, he won the St. Christopher Award, an honor presented by the Vilnius City Council to recognize contributions to the city. In 2006, he won the Golden Stage Cross.
