= Alfonsas Andriuškevičius =

Lithuanian politician

Alfonsas Andriuškevičius (born November 18, 1940, in Vilkaviškis, Lithuania) is a poet and art historian. He received the Lithuanian National Prize in 2007 for essay Rašymas dūmais (Writing with Smoke, 2004) and collection of art critique Lietuvių dailė 1975-1995 (Lithuanian Art 1975-1995, 1997).

Andriuškevičius graduated from Vilnius University in 1965, and went on to explore a variety of disciplines, including ethnography and philosophy. from 1974 to 1990 worked at Lithuanian Academy of Sciences. He taught the Russian language, lectured at the Vilnius Academy of Art from 1989 to 2009. His publications include several books of art criticism, four poetry collections, and a collection of thirty essays.

== Selected works ==
- Rašymas dūmais, 2004
- Grožis ir menas lietuvių estetikoje 1918–1940, 1989
- 33 eilėraščiai, 1994
- 66 eilėraščiai, 1998
- Eilėraščiai, 2000
- Lietuvių dailė 1975–1995, 1997
