= Vladimir Tarasov (musician) =

Russian–Lithuanian jazz musician, drummer, percussionist, director

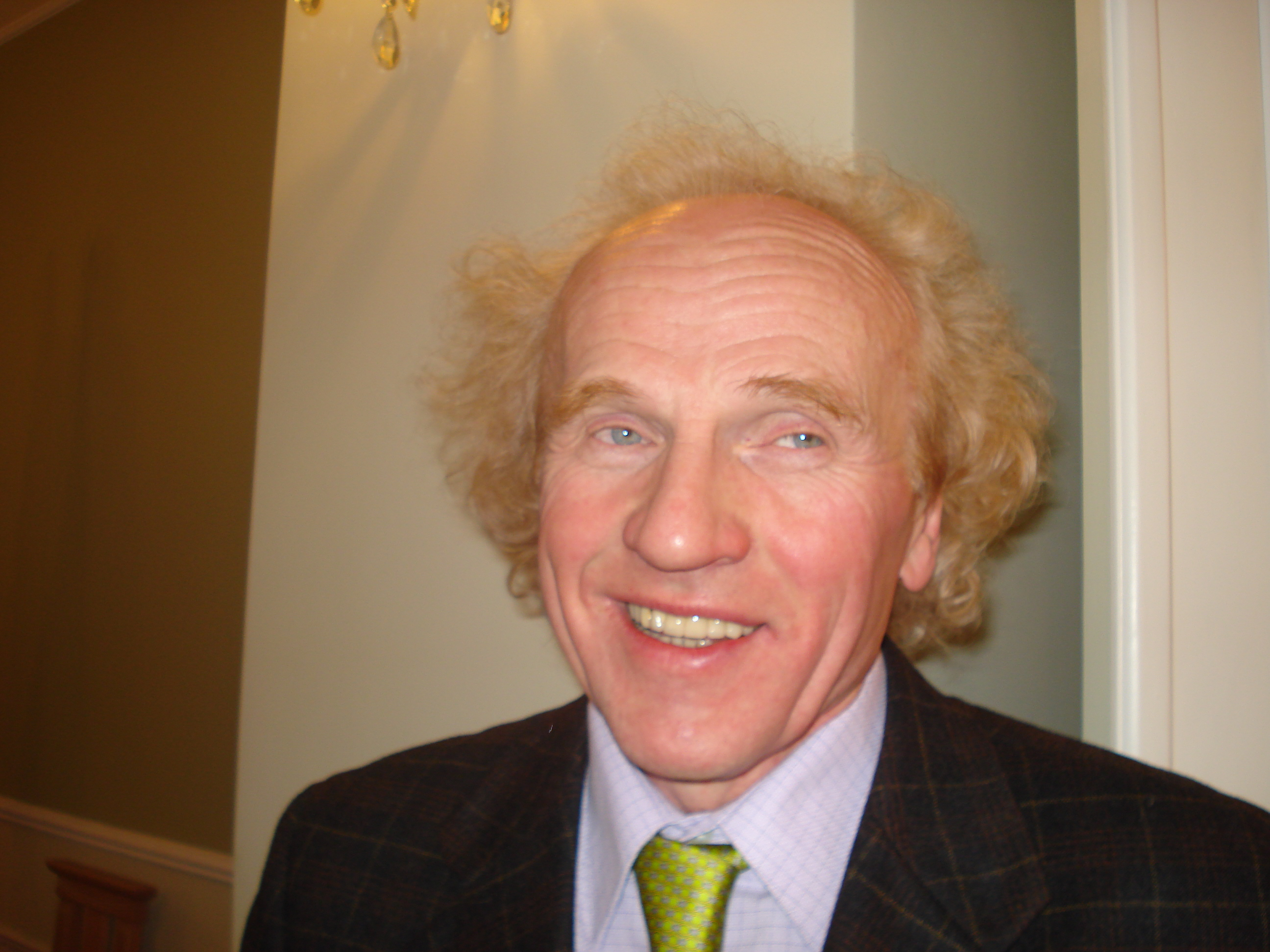
- Tarasov in 2007
- Born: 29 June 1947 (age 79); Arkhangelsk, Russian SFSR, Soviet Union
- Education: Arkhangelsk College of Music, Saint Petersburg Conservatory (expelled in 1966)
- Occupations: Jazz musician, drummer, percussionist, music director
- Years active: 1961–present

Vladimir Tarasov (Cyrillic: Владимир Петрович Тарасов; Lithuanian: Vladimiras Tarasovas; born on 29 June 1947) is a Russian–Lithuanian worldwide famous drummer, jazz musician, percussionist, music director. He was awarded multiple Soviet and Lithuanian awards for his musical accomplishments.

== Biography ==
Tarasov began playing jazz at the age of 14 in Arkhangelsk, at a local club for sailors. From 1961 to 1966, he studied at the Arkhangelsk College of Music. In 1966, he began his studies at the Saint Petersburg Conservatory, but was expelled that same year for promoting jazz.

In 1967, Tarasov moved to Vilnius where he initially played jazz at a restaurant. In 1971, he formed a famous instrumental jazz ensemble GTČ together with Vyacheslav Ganelin and Vladimir Nikolaevich Čekasin with which he held musical tours in the Soviet Union. Since 1984 he played at the Lithuanian National Philharmonic Society as soloist percussionist. Tarasov was named the best drummer in the Soviet Union (1980–1987), the No. 2 jazz musician of the year (1987), and the No. 2 drummer in Europe (1986), and was awarded the Russian Triumph Award in 2009.

Following the Re-Establishment of the State of Lithuania in 1990, Tarasov stayed in Lithuania and continued his musical career there. In 1999–2003, he was art director of the Russian Drama Theatre of Lithuania. Tarasov was awarded an award of the Vilnius Jazz Festival in 2012 for his contributions to Lithuanian jazz culture and the Lithuanian National Prize for Culture and Arts in 2016 as a member of the ensemble GTČ.

Tarasov expressed his critical views towards the Russian government under Vladimir Putin, considering it "absolutely fascist and even worse", and the 2022 Russian invasion of Ukraine.
