= Audronė Vaupšienė =

Lithuanian transdisciplinarity artist (born 1965)

Audra Vau
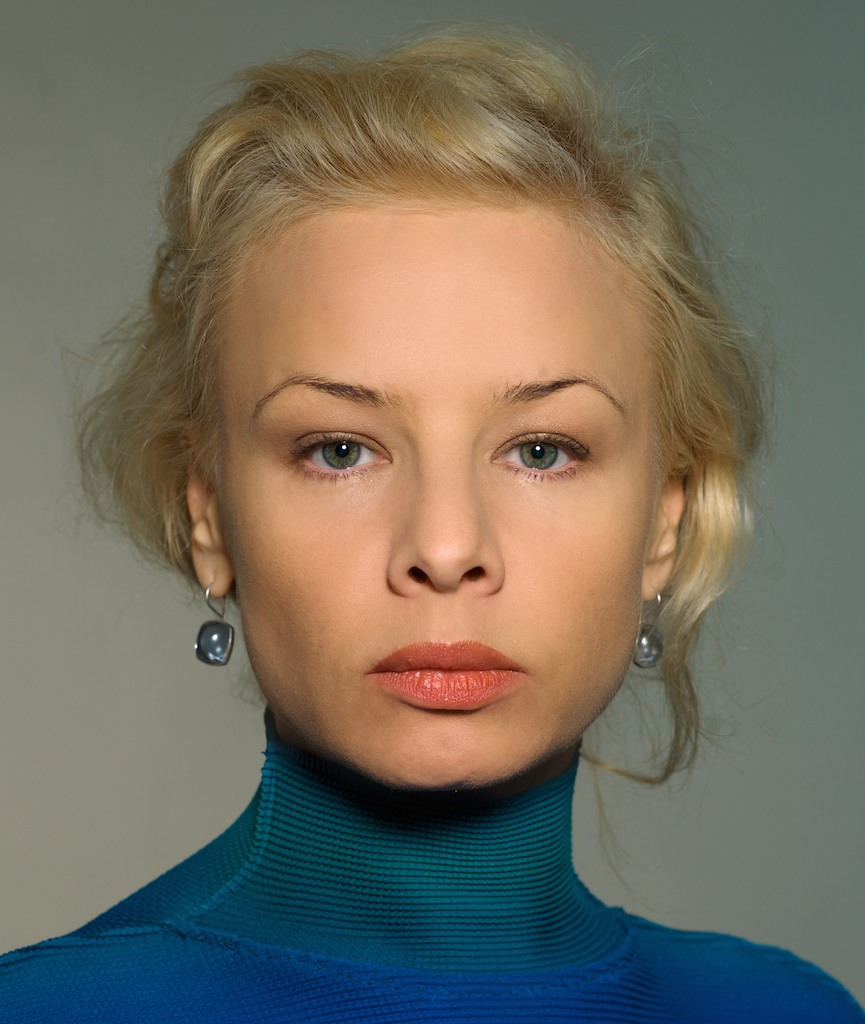
- Born: Audronė Vaupšienė; January 11, 1965 (age 61); Vilnius, Lithuania
- Education: National M. K. Čiurlionis School of Art
- Known for: Photography
- Website: www.audravau.lt

Audra Vau (birth name Audronė Vaupšienė) is a Lithuanian transdisciplinarity artist born in 1970 in Vilnius, Lithuania. She lives and works mostly in Vilnius, Lithuania and London.

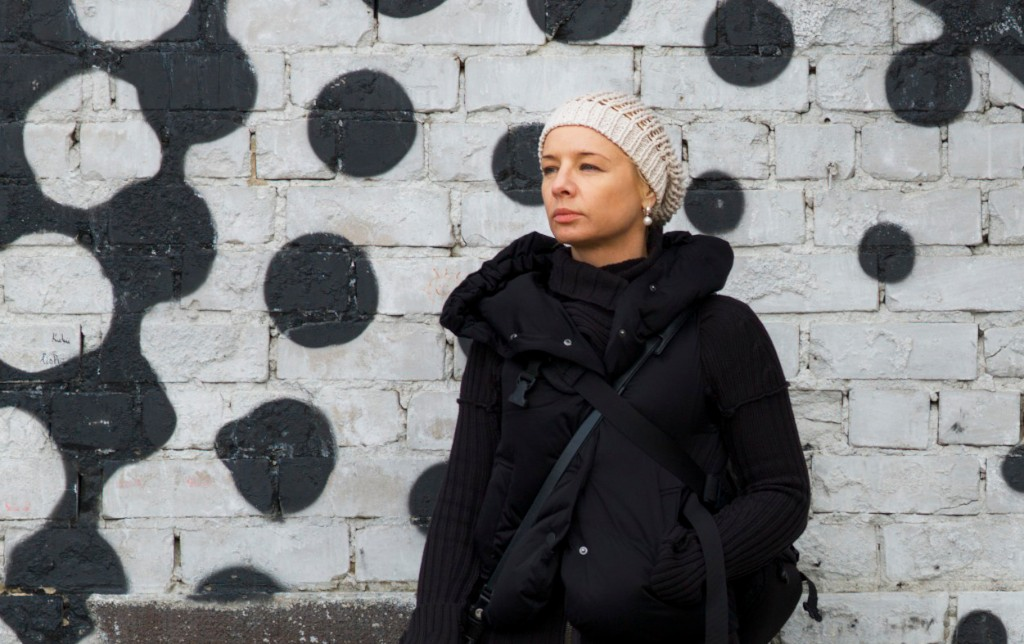
Audra Vau.

Audra Vau was born in 1970 in Lithuania and studied in National M. K. Čiurlionis School of Art, Vilnius, Lithuania. She works with the idea of performativity of nature and landscape and uses video and photography.

== Exhibitions ==
She has exhibited numerous times at the Contemporary Art Centre Vilnius (2000, 2001, 2013), Jonas Mekas Center, Vilnius (2011, solo) Christine Koning gallery, Vienna (2013), Max Lust Gallery, Vienna (2015, solo.

- 1998: "Three portraits of the artist" as magazine page-project with Raimundas Malašauskas
- 2000: "Innocent Life" at the Contemporary Art Centre, Vilnius
- 2001: "Walls for NATO" (with Evaldas Jansas) at the Contemporary Art Centre, Vilnius
- 2001: "Light" (with Evaldas Jansas) at the Contemporary Art Centre, Vilnius
- 2011: "Audronė Vaupšienė: Three Stories" at the Jonas Mekas Visual Arts Center, Vilnius
- 2013: Group exhibition at the Contemporary Art Centre, Vilnius
- 2014: Group exhibition at the Christine Konig Gallery, Vienna
- 2015: Upcoming solo exhibition at the Max Lust Gallery, Vienna

In 2015, her exhibition "Edge of Chaos", in collaboration with Gianluca Malgeri and LaToya Frazier and curated by Vita Zaman and Nicola Vassel, was part of the Venice Biennale.
