= Šarūnas Nakas =

- Born: 1962 (age 63–64); Kaunas, Lithuania
- Genres: avant-garde, contemporary classical, experimental, electroacoustic
- Occupation: composer/performer/broadcaster/essayist/curator/video artist

Šarūnas Nakas (born August 2, 1962) is a Lithuanian composer, essayist, curator, filmmaker and broadcaster.

A student of Julius Juzeliūnas at the Lithuanian Academy of Music and Theatre, he graduated in 1986 before going to Poland for further study between 1988 and 1991; he has also worked at the IRCAM in Paris (1998). Meanwhile, he followed classes with Witold Lutoslawski, Louis Andriessen and Gérard Grisey.

In 1982, Nakas founded the Vilnius New Music Ensemble, with which he has toured in 15 European countries and Canada for eighteen consecutive years. Nakas was also artistic director of the Gaida contemporary music festival (1996) and Musica Ficta festival (1997), both in Vilnius. In 2001 he wrote a textbook on contemporary music, the first of its kind in Lithuania. Between 2000 and 2007 he was a musical editor of the cultural monthly Kultūros barai in Vilnius. Since 2002 he's hosting programs about contemporary music on Lithuanian radio. Since 2011, he has been moderating the online magazine for contemporary music modus-radio.com.

Since 2005, he has worked on multi-channel video installations, using his own music as soundtrack. In 2012, Nakas founded the Šarūnas Nakas' Multimedia Quintet.

He was co-curator of the international art exhibition Dialogues of Colour and Sound. Works by M. K. Čiurlionis and his contemporaries in Vilnius (2009).

Nakas was awarded the Lithuanian National Arts and Culture Prize in 2007, and has received numerous other awards for his work.

== Selected compositions ==
- Merz-machine for virtual orchestra (1985) or six pianos (1997)
- Vox-machine for virtual choir (1985)
- Ricercars for seven amplified instruments (1985)
- Motet for five voices (1985)
- Arcanum for viola and organ (1987)
- Sarmatia for organ (1990)
- And this Tranquillity for voice, singing violinist, singing trombonist and singing pianist (1991)
- Fluctus semigallorum for actress, soprano, bass, viola and trombone (1991)
- Cenotaph for chamber ensemble (1995)
- Crypt for percussion and double-bass (1996)
- Chronon for clarinet, trumpet, piano, percussion, cello and double-bass (1997)
- Ziqquratu for flute, clarinet, piano, percussion, violin and cello (1998)
- Vilne for tenor, four horns, two pianos and percussion (1998)
- Ziqquratu-2 for percussion, chamber ensemble and electronics (1999)
- Fight and Escape for ensemble (1999)
- Aporia for three chamber groups (2001)
- The Cup of Grail for clarinet and two percussion (2001)
- Drang nach Westen. A New Sermon to the Barbarians for large ensemble (2003)
- Eyes Dazzled by the North for chamber ensemble (2004)
- Nude for large orchestra (2004)
- Crown for wind orchestra (2005)
- Dreamlike Venice, a Flammable Hurricane of Love for violin, soprano, baritone, two actors and chamber orchestra (2006)
- Reliquary for voice, electric zither and oboe (2008)
- Icon of Fire for chamber ensemble or piano solo (2008)
- Resistance for large orchestra (2009)
- Kitman for piano (2012)
- Tuba mirum for tuba and 10 brass (2012)
- Machine désirante for cello and 17 strings (2015)
- Target for seven cellos (2017)
- Hymn for piano, harpsichord and organ (2017)
- Merz-Machine-Postlude for any number of keyboards (2017)
- Vilne for voices, piano, percussion and electronics, lyrics by Moshe Kulbak (2017 m.)
- A Woman Under the Influence session for a set of kanklės and winds (2017)
- Silence and the Mirror for kannel and kanklės (2022)
- Women's Gaze session for two orchestras (2022)
- very simply for birbynė and kanklės (2023)
- Mélisande for violin, cello and piano (2024)

== Multimedial works ==
- At Heaven's Door performance (2000)
- Falling Portraits, Broken Hearts, Eternal Victims performance (2002)
- Sanguis Is Blood performance (2003)
- I Was Shot performance (2003)
- Painting on Sky installation (2005)
- Aporia 3-channel video and music installation (2006)
- The Gospel According to Blacksmith Ignotas 7-channel video and music installation (2007)
- 100 hi-STORIES: The National Museum of Musical Legends multimedia installation with series of short silent experimental movies (2008-ongoing)
- Čiurlionis as Composer: Soundscapes educational multimedia installation (2009)
- Ziqquratu-3 for performer, multi-percussionist, live- and pre-programmed electronics, and video (2012)
- Delirium of Apollo for piano, kanklės (zither), prerecorded voice and transmitting objects (2015)
- La fenêtre mystique for piano and transmitting objects (2015)
- Vilne for voices, piano, percussion and electronics (2017)
- Cipher for piano, percussion, musique concrète and radio noises (2017)
- Vibrations Cosmiques for piano, synthesizer, percussion, electric guitar, contrabass clarinet and electronics (2018)
- A Woman Under The Influence performance with installation for woman instrumentalist and male performer (2019)
- How It Is for voice and electronics (2021)
- Strip-Tease Intégral for electric violin, electric cello and silent performer (2025)
- Dark Matter for six pianists and transmitting objects (2026)

== Recordings ==
- Nude (2007) chamber and orchestral music (CD)
- Eyes Dazzled by the North (2012) chamber music (CD)
- Ziqquratu (2012) electronic music (CD) and multimedia works (DVD)
- At Heaven's Door (2016) chamber music and musique concrète
- Cipher (2017) chamber and electroacoustic music (CD)

also in:

- Experimental Music (1997) incl. Merz Machine (tape music version)
- Transmission: pianocircus (2001) incl. Merz Machine (six pianos version)
- Zoom in: new music from Lithuania (2002) incl. Chronon
- Zoom in 2: new music from Lithuania (2003) incl. Aporia
- Gaida (2005) incl. Aporia and Drang nach Westen. A New Sermon to the Barbarians
- Zoom in 5: new music from Lithuania (2007) incl. Crown
- Zoom in 8: New Music from Lithuania (2010) incl. Icon of Fire
