= Sigita =

Female given name

- Gender: Female
- Name day: July 31

Origin
- Region of origin: Lithuania, Latvia

Other names
- Related names: Sigitas

Sigita is a Lithuanian and Latvian feminine given name. The associated name day is July 31.

== Notable people named Sigita ==
- Sigita Burbienė (born 1954), Lithuanian politician
- Sigita Mikalauskaitė (born 1975), Lithuanian dancer
- Sigita Strečen (born 1958), Lithuanian handball player
