= Ona Narbutienė =

Lithuanian musicologist and educator

Ona Narbutienė (26 October 1930 in Kaunas – 10 July 2007 in Vilnius) was a Lithuanian musicologist and educator. She received the Lithuanian National Prize for arts and culture in 1999, and was the author of a number of articles on Lithuanian music history and several books on Lithuanian composers and musical personalities.

Narbutienė was born into the family of Lithuanian officer and spent her childhood in Klaipėda. In 1949, she was arrested in Vilnius and deported to Siberia, Irkutsk Oblast, where she was forced to work in brick factory. After some time she could finish her education and started working as a musical teacher in Irkutsk school. After Joseph Stalin's death she was allowed to return to Lithuania. 1955-1960 she studied at Vilnius Conservatory and started researching music history.

Narbutienė organized the musical program of the Thomas Mann Festival in Nida from its inception in 1995 until 2007. The summer festival, under her sponsorship, was dedicated to topics such as Thomas Mann and Richard Wagner (1998), Thomas Mann and the myth (2000) and Thomas Mann and the North (2001). The programs combined concerts, readings, exhibitions, theatre performances, and film screenings. She described the festival's concept as revolving around the connections of Thomas Mann to music. She also contributed to the inclusion of song and dance celebrations in Estonia, Latvia and Lithuania in UNESCO's Masterpieces of the Oral and Intangible Heritage of Humanity.
