= Yesterday and Forever =

- Lithuanian: Vakar ir visados
- Directed by: Gytis Lukšas
- Written by: Marcelijus Martinaitis; Gytis Lukšas
- Starring: Marcelijus Martinaitis; Veronika Povilionienė; Gintaras Tilvytis; Arūnas Ivanauskas; Rima Lozovaitė
- Music by: Veronika Povilionienė
- Release date: 1984
- Running time: 63 minutes
- Country: Soviet Union
- Languages: Lithuanian, Russian

Yesterday and Forever (Lithuanian: Vakar ir visados) is a Soviet film created in 1984. This film is a joint creation by the director Gytis Lukšas, singer Veronika Povilionienė and scriptwriter, poet Marcelijus Martinaitis.

This film was made by a commission of the Soviet Central Television but later for the first three after creation is had no public debut. Instead, it had been shown in the cinemas of towns and small cities. After it had been shown in the Tbilisi Cinema by an initiative of Sergei Parajanov, it got recognition in Lithuanian SSR also.

As an educational material, Yesterday and Forever was shown to students at some universities in the USA. Russian linguist and mythologist Vladimir Toporov praised this film as a metaphorical representation of the archaic worldview to a modern viewer.

The film was filmed in an old Dzūkish house in Alytus District Municipality.

== Plot ==
The film has no narrative, no professional actors or intrigue. Various Lithuanian folk traditions, agriculture works and rituals are presented by folk artists and dancers. Folk songs performed by Veronika Povilionienė, poems of Marcelijus Martinaitis and traditional Lithuanian instrumental music make a sonic ambience of the movie.
