= Oskaras Koršunovas =

Lithuanian theatre director

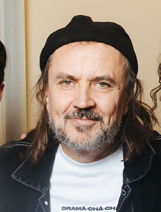

Oskaras Koršunovas is a Lithuanian theatre director.

== Biography ==
Oskaras Koršunovas was born in Vilnius, Lithuania. He began his career as a theatre director in 1994 at the Lithuanian Academy of Music and Theatre, where he obtained his master's degree in directing. During his studies he established already his individual signature in the most important theaters in Lithuania by producing a trilogy of plays such as the There to be Here (1990), The Old Woman (1992) and Hello Sonya New Year (1994), which were based on the work of Daniil Kharms and Alexander Vvedensky, both Russian avant-garde writers of the twentieth century. From early stages on Oskaras stood out for his unique theatrical language and new contemporary approach to stage performances that theatre critics envisaged as the inevitable emergence of a new theatre.

Oskaras went on with like-minded colleagues and founded in 1998 the renowned repertory theatre the Oskaras Koršunovas Theatre (OKT) with the purpose to distance themselves from the artistic reality of that time and create a new reality which was based on a contemporary theatre language. The intention was to find new ways to communicate with the audience by implementing controversial ideas. His perception that contemporary plays should reflect present time and predict the future as a warning element caught the attention of the audience. Oskaras became the first director to examine independent, post-communist Lithuanian society, and its relationships and conflicts and he kept looking for new forms and ways of communicating by stepping beyond the borders of the traditional understanding of theatre.

For his work, Oskaras received the Lithuanian National Prize for Culture and Arts in 2002, the Europe Prize Theatrical Realities in 2006, the Meyerhold Prize in 2010 and national Golden Cross Awards in three different years 2004, 2011 and 2012. He has produced and directed over 70 plays. Among them stand Shakespeare's Hamlet in 2008, The Lower Depths in 2010 which was awarded as The Best Performance of 2010 and Miranda, based on Shakespeare’s The Tempest in 2012 that gained international fame and received three national awards of the Golden Cross in 2012: for best directing, best leading actress (Airida Gintautaite) and the best composer (Gintaras Sodeika). The Oskaras Koršunovas Theatre toured amongst the famous Lithuanian theaters and produced projects that were staged in France, Germany, Spain, Italy, Portugal, Australia, Japan, China, Israel, South Korea, Brazil, Argentina, and the United States. Also he has participated in festivals worldwide including the prestigious Edinburgh International Festival and the Festival d'Avignon.

== Honours and awards ==
Oskaras was awarded the Cross of Officer of Order of the Lithuanian Grand Duke Gediminas.

- 1990. “Fringe Firsts” at the Edinburgh International Theatre Festival for "There to Be Here.” Edinburgh.
- 1991. Special prize of the Torun International Theatre Festival “Kontakt” for "There to Be Here.” Torun
- 1991. "Fringe First "at the Edinburg International Theatre Festival for the play "There to Be Here.“ Edinburgh
- 1993. Prize for the Best Director’s work at the St. Petersburg international Theatre Festival for "There to Be Here“ and "The Old Woman.“ St. Petersburg
- 1993. Prize of the Sevastopol International Theatre Festival “The Kherson Games” for “There to Be Here.” Sebastopol
- 1993. Prize of the magazine “St. Petersburg Theatre Review” for "There to Be Here.” St Petersburg
- 1994. Prize of the Lithuanian Theatre Union for "Hello Sonya New Year.”
- 1995. "The Bank of Scotland Herald Angels" Prize at the Edinburgh International Theatre Festival for "Hello Sonya New Year.” Edinburgh.
- 1995. Lithuanian Theatre Award “Kristoforas” for the Best young artist for the trilogy: "There to Be Here", "The Old Woman", "Hello Sonya New Year.”
- 1997. Special Prize of the "Soros Fund "at the Riga Theatre Festival “Homo Novus” for "P.S. File O.K"
- 1998. Prize of the Torun International Theatre Festival “Kontakt” for the Best Director for "Old Woman 2.” Torun
- 2000. Lithuanian Theatre Award ”Kristoforas” for the Best Director for "A Midsummer Night’s Dream.”
- 2000. Lithuanian Theatre Award ”Kristoforas” for the Best Director for "Shopping and Fucking.”
- 2000. 2nd Award of the Torun International Theatre Festival “Kontakt” for the Best Performance "A Midsummer Night’s Dream.”
- 2001. European Theatre unions Award "Europe Theatre Prize for New Theatrical Realities.”
- 2001. Best young Director Prize at the MESS Festival, for “The Master and Margarita.” Sarajevo
- 2002. Montblanc Theatre Prize "Young Directors Project Award" at Salzburg International Theatre festival for "Oedipus Rex.” Salzburg
- 2002. The Lithuanian National Prize of Culture and Art for "Oedipus Rex.”
- 2003. Cross of Officer of the Order of the Lithuanian Grand Duke Gediminas.
- 2003. Critic’s Prize at the MESS Festival for “Oedipus Rex”. Sarajevo.
- 2003. Award of Golden Cross of the Stage for The Most Excellent and Lamentable Tragedy of “Romeo and Juliet.”
- 2003. Award of Golden Cross of the Stage for “The Cold Child.”
- 2004. The Lithuanian Institute Award “LT Identity” for the weightiest contribution in representing the Lithuanian Culture.
- 2004. Lithuanian Theatre Award ”Golden Stage Cross” for the performances: "Romeo and Juliet” and "Cold Child.”
- 2004. "Mira Trailovi" Grand Prix at Belgrade International Theatre Festival for "Romeo and Juliet" Belgrad.
- 2006. Europe Theatre Prize - Europe Prize Theatrical Realities
- 2006. Golden Cross of Merit from the President of Poland. Warsaw
- 2009. Honourable title of the Chevalier of the French order of Literature and Arts Paris.
- 2010. First Prize of the Annual Meyerhold Assembly, Moscow
- 2010. Award of Golden Cross of the Best director of Stage for “The Lower Depths.” Performance of the year.
- 2011. Award of Golden Cross of the Stage for “Expulsion.”
- 2011. Award of Golden Cross of the Stage for “Miranda.”
- 2012. The Medal of the Lithuanian Ministry of Culture “Bring Your Light and Believe.”
- 2012. Prize of Best Director in International Festival “Kontakt”, Poland.
- 2013. Hedda Award for Best Director of the Year for “Peer Gynt.” Oslo, Norway
- 2013. Best Director and Best Performance Award at the Croatian International Small Stage Festival for “Miranda."
- 2014. Three awards for “The Seagull” including, Best Director, Special Critics and Press Award and Third Prize for the Performance at the "International Theatre Festival KONTAKT.”
- 2014. Two awards at International Theatre Festival “Baltic House” including Critics Prize for "The Seagull" and the Audience Prize for Krapp's Last Tape
- 2015. Prestigious award: Swedish Commander Grand Cross: Order of the Polar Star
