= Henrikas Čigriejus =

Lithuanian writer and poet

Henrikas Algis Čigriejus (March 1, 1933 - July 1, 2016) was a Lithuanian writer of poetry and short stories.

Čigriejus was born in Vidugiriai, Pasvalys District. He graduated from Vilnius University in Lithuanian language and literature studies in 1958. From 1960 to 2003 he taught Lithuanian literature, aesthetics and cultural history at what now is known as the Vilnius Cooperative College.

== Awards ==
His awards, among others, include:

- 2011: Lithuanian National Prize for Culture and Arts
- 2008:Žemaitė Literary Prize
- 2004: Lithuanian Government Culture and Arts Prize
- 1995: Union of Lithuanian Writers' Prize
- 1992: Spring of Poetry laureate
- 1990: Joivingians' Prize
