= Kazimieras Saja =

Lithuanian politician

Kazimieras Saja (born 27 June 1932) is a Lithuanian writer and politician. In 1990 he was among those who signed the Act of the Re-Establishment of the State of Lithuania.

== Awards ==
- 1998: Knight's Cross of the Order of the Lithuanian Grand Duke Gediminas
- 2022: Lithuanian National Prize for Culture and Arts.
