= National M. K. Čiurlionis School of Art =

Art school in Vilnius, Lithuania

Coordinates: 54°41′30″N 25°18′07″E

National M. K. Čiurlionis School of Art

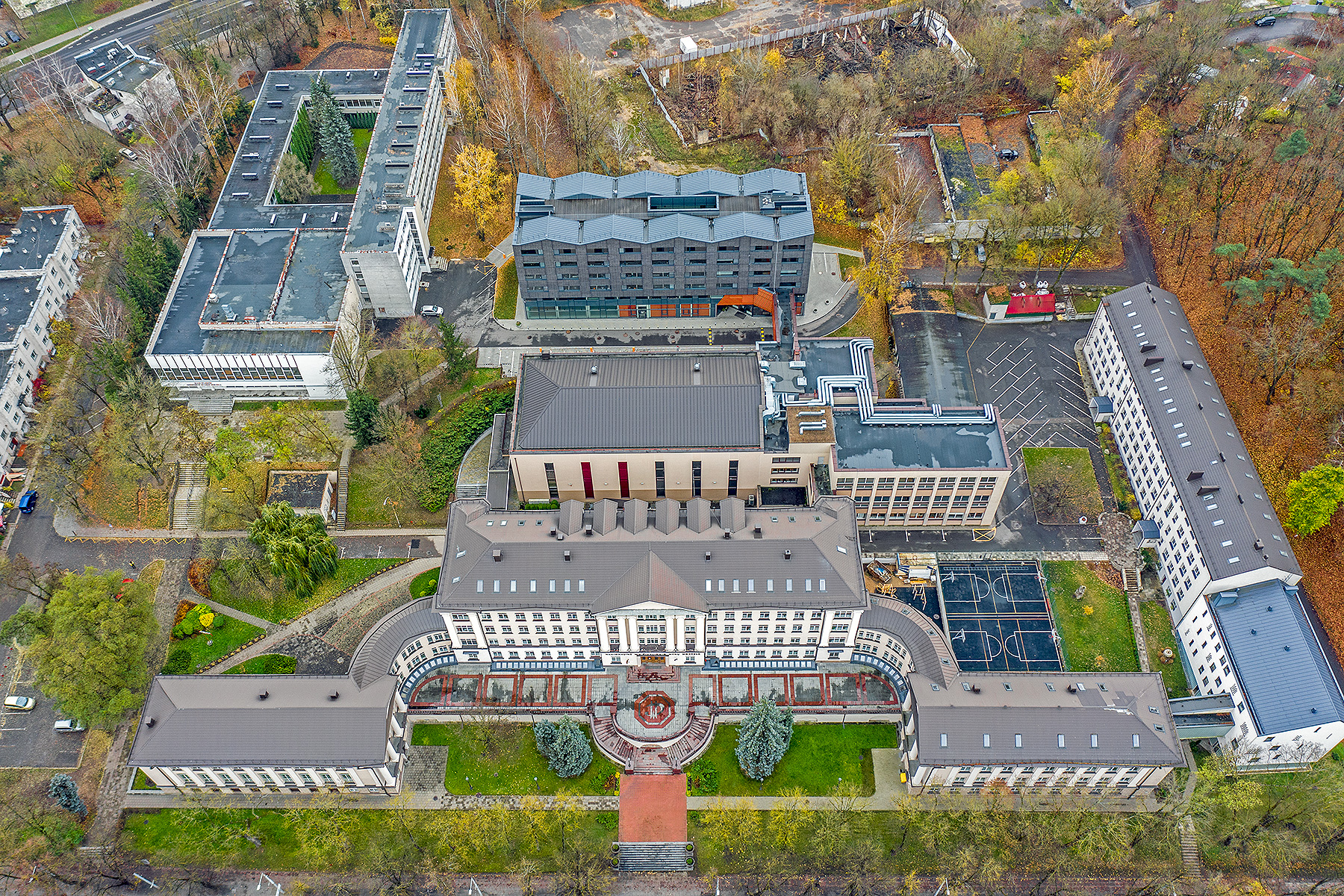
Aerial view of campus(2020)

National M. K. Čiurlionis School of Art (Lithuanian: Nacionalinė Mikalojaus Konstantino Čiurlionio menų mokykla) was founded in 1945 in Vilnius–Antakalnis, Lithuania. It is named after the famous Lithuanian painter and composer Mikalojus Konstantinas Čiurlionis since 1965. It is the only such school in Lithuania, spanning the entire 12-year learning cycle. After the twelfth grade, having successfully passed final examinations in general and art subjects, pupils receive a school certificate. Learning is free of charge for Lithuanian pupils, but not for foreigners. Gifted children above 6–7 years old are allowed to join the school if their qualities match certain criteria of the correspondent specialty. The school also organizes training courses and seminars for students abroad.

== Departments ==
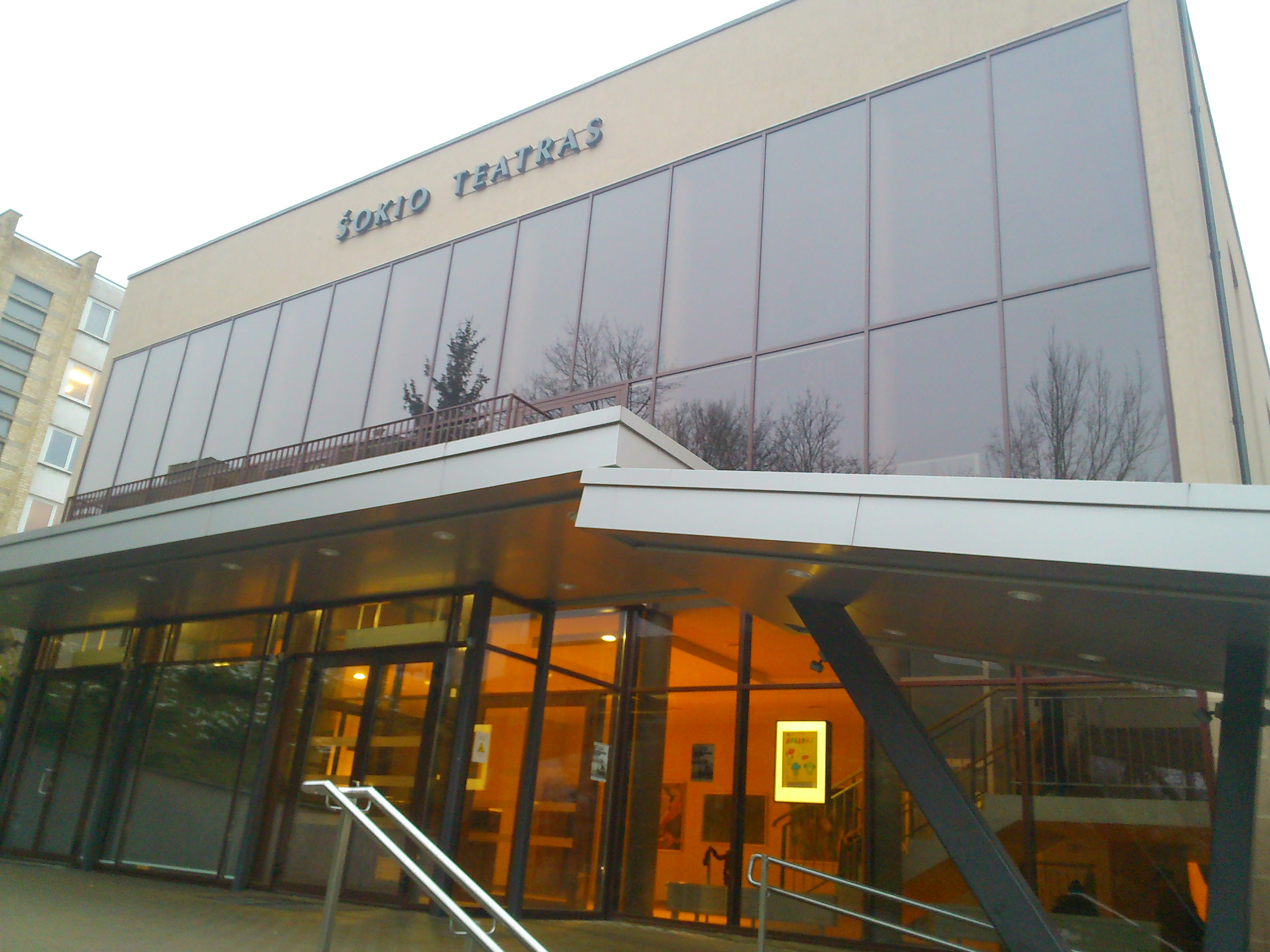
Dance theatre (Lithuanian: Šokio teatras) of the school

There are three main departments in the school: Music, Fine Arts and Ballet. As of 2006, the staff consists of 46 general education, 25 art, 88 music and 25 ballet teachers.

=== Music Department ===
The Music Department gives tuition in pianoforte, string, wind, percussion and other instruments, choral conducting and music theory. It also hosts a junior string orchestra.

=== Fine Arts Department ===
The Fine Arts Department offers the following four subjects: painting, graphics, sculpture and design. In addition to that, all the pupils study professional principles of art history, theoretical background, drawing and other art disciplines. Young artists have had their works exhibited in Japan, the Netherlands, Austria, Sweden, Finland and the United States.

=== Ballet Department ===
The Ballet Department offers courses in classical, character, duet and historical dance, artistry, ballet and theatre history, as well as other art subjects. Training of a ballet artist is divided into three stages – early artistic training (grades 1–4), specialized artist training with the first professional skills (grades 5–8) and a two-level professional training comprising grades 9–10 and grades 11–12. It is cited as one of the finest in the Baltic.

Between 1986 and 2001 the department was an independent Vilnius Ballet School. Eglė Špokaitė graduated here in 1989 and Jolanta Valeikaitė is also amongst its notable alumni.

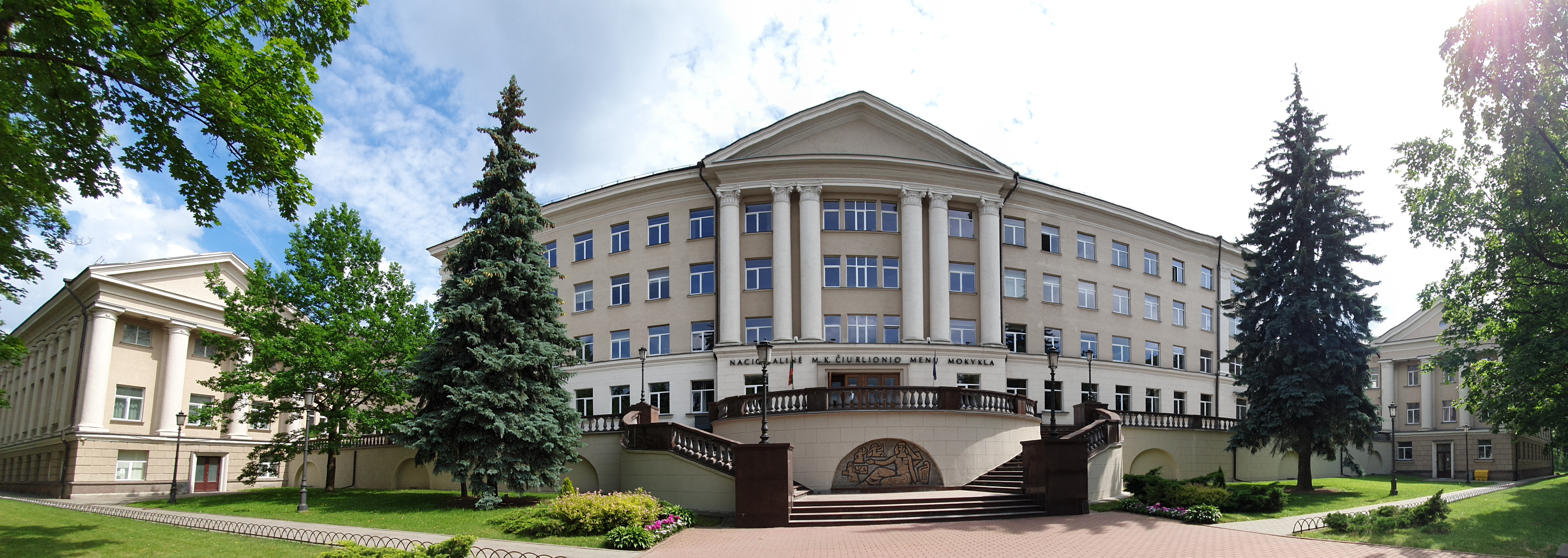
Panorama of the National M. K. Čiurlionis School of Art main façade.

== Notable students ==
Many famous Lithuanian artists got their education at the National M. K. Čiurlionis School of Art, including:

Musicians

- Valentinas Antanavičius
- Gediminas Gelgotas
- Petras Geniušas, pianist
- David Geringas, cellist
- Asmik Grigorian (b. 1981), soprano
- Vytautas Janulionis
- Gintaras Januševičius
- Nomeda Kazlaus (b. 1974), soprano
- Simonas Pinkoraitis
- Mantas Razgaitis
- Gintaras Rinkevičius, conductor
- Mirga Gražinytė-Tyla, conductor
- Mūza Rubackytė, pianist

Ballet dancers

- Anželika Cholina
- Eglė Špokaitė
- Jurgita Dronina
- Martynas Rimeikis
- Edvinas Jakonis
- Neli Beliakaitė
- OLga Konošenko
- Eligijus Butkus

Visual artists

- Audronė Vaupšienė
- Laura Andrijauskaite
- Skaistė Verdingytė.

== International relations ==
The School closely cooperates with many schools of similar type; among them are Juilliard (USA), Detmold, Viernheim, Weimar and Vasario 16-osios (Germany), Łódź and Kraków (Poland). The school belongs to the International Association of Musical Schools. Every year the schoolchildren take part in a number of international competitions.
