= Kęstutis Dirgėla =

Lithuanian engineer and politician

Member of the Seimas
- In office 1992–1996

Personal details
- Born: May 9, 1960 (age 66) Klaipėda, Lithuania
- Education: Kaunas University of Technology
- Occupation: Engineer

Kęstutis Dirgėla (born May 9, 1960, Klaipėda) is a Lithuanian engineer and politician.

He was member of the Seimas (Lithuanian parliament) from November 24, 1992 to November 22, 1996.

He was General Director of Lithuanian Railways (2000–2001).
