= Arvydas Šliogeris =

Lithuanian philosopher (1944–2019)

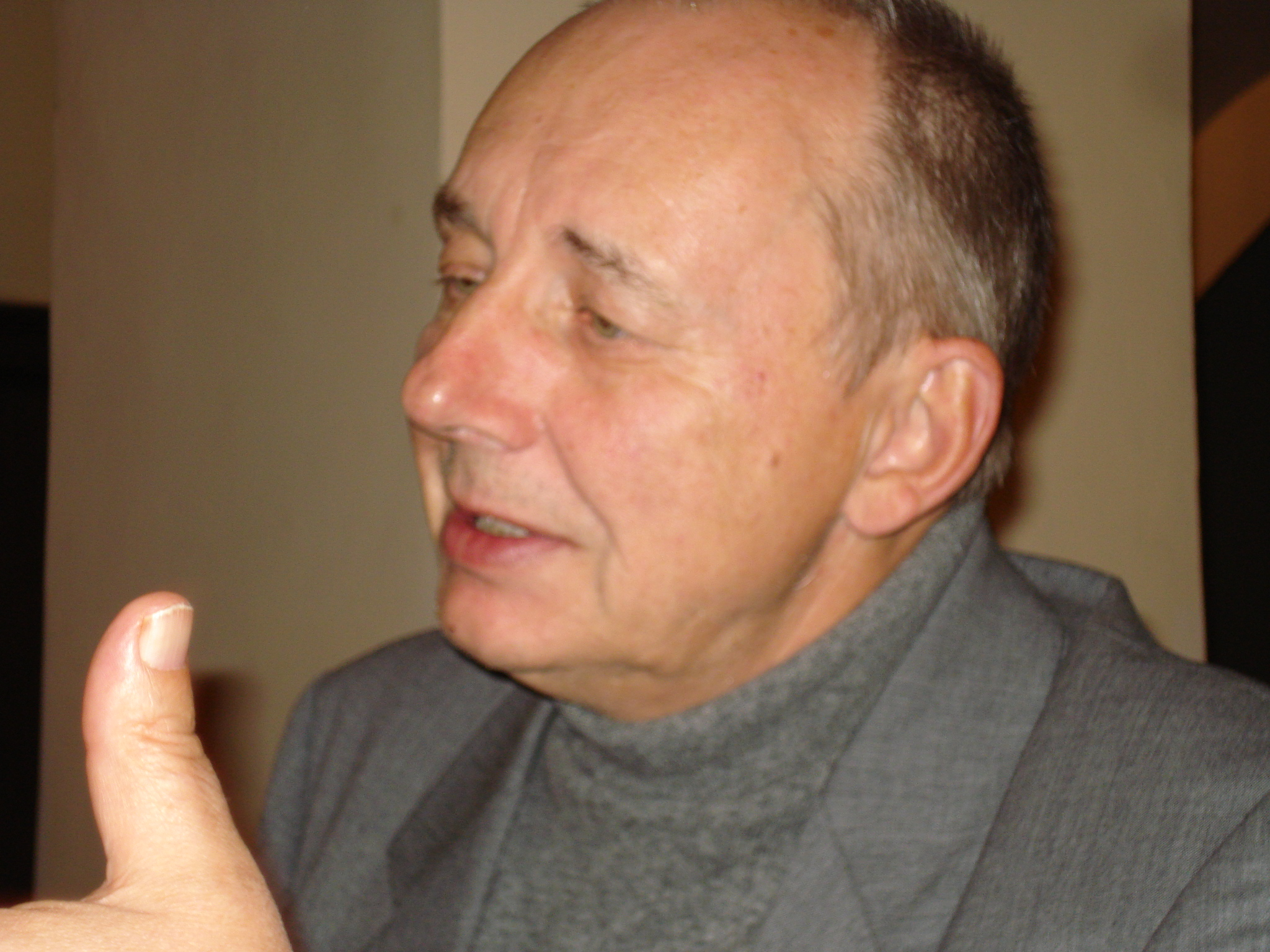
- Portrait of Šliogeris, 2008
- Born: Marijus Arvydas Šliogeris; 12 September 1944; Panevėžys, Lithuanian Soviet Socialist Republic
- Died: 18 December 2019 (aged 75); Vilnius, Lithuania
- Political party: Sąjūdis
- Partner: Zita Šliogerienė

Education
- Education: Kaunas Polytechnic Institute

Philosophical work
- Region: Western philosophy; Lithuanian philosophy
- School: Continental philosophy; Phenomenology; German idealism; Existentialism
- Main interests: aesthetics, ethics, literary criticism, philosophy of language
- Website: sliogeris.pavb.lt

Arvydas Šliogeris (Lithuanian pronunciation: [arˈvʲidɑs ˈʃljɔɡɛrɪs]; 12 September 1944 – 18 December 2019) was a Lithuanian philosopher, researcher of German existentialism, translator of philosophical texts, and essayist.

== Biography ==
Arvydas Šliogeris was born and raised in a family of teachers. His father taught Latin and German languages, while his mother taught drawing and geography. The family lived in a countryside estate on the outskirts of the city, where they had a small farm and raised animals.

He graduated with a gold medal from Panevėžys 2nd High School. From 1962 to 1967, he studied at the Faculty of Chemical Technology at Kaunas University of Technology.

In 1970, he began working at the Faculty of Philosophy at Vilnius University, where he taught philosophy from 1973 to 2012 and became an associate professor in 1979. In 1987, he earned a doctoral degree in philosophy. In 1990, he was one of the founders of the Lithuanian Liberal Union. From 2003 to 2012, he served as the head of the Faculty of Philosophy at Vilnius University, and since 2012, he has been a professor emeritus. From 2007, he was a full member of the Lithuanian Academy of Sciences in the field of philosophy.

== Philosophy ==
Arvydas Šliogeris was one of the most productive Lithuanian philosophers. During the years of the rebirth, he actively engaged in publicism and became known for his sharp, vivid, and often controversial statements. This philosopher was characterized by an evaluation of hierarchical social structures and criticism of egalitarianism (ideas of human equality). He spoke against the referendum process, as it did not correspond to his views, since voting was not dependent on a person's social status.

Arvydas Šliogeris' thinking is characterized by the power of philosophical insight, contemplation of the fundamental foundations of philosophy, paradoxicality, virtuoso linguistic expression, originality, respect for tradition, the creative inclusion of ideas from great Western thinkers into his own field of philosophy, the preservation of individuality, and the connection of everyday experience reflection with contemplation of fundamental Western philosophical texts. The main themes of his philosophy include being and nothingness, sensuality and supersensuality, seeing and thinking, the inhuman world as a place of immanent transcendence phenomena, the nature of the language phenomenon, the relationship between sensually experienced objects and verbally created supersensory sphere, love of a specific place or location (philotopia), the fate of Western philosophy and culture, and the condition of modern Western society. He made significant contributions to the creation of modern philosophical terminology in Lithuanian and the education of Lithuanian philosophers, actively advocating for the status of Lithuanian and the Lithuanian language in society.

Arvydas Šliogeris translated works by Karl Popper, Martin Heidegger, Georg Wilhelm Friedrich Hegel, Arthur Schopenhauer, Friedrich Nietzsche, Hannah Arendt, Albert Camus, and Karl Marx.
