= Petras Dirgėla =

Lithuanian writer (1947–2015)

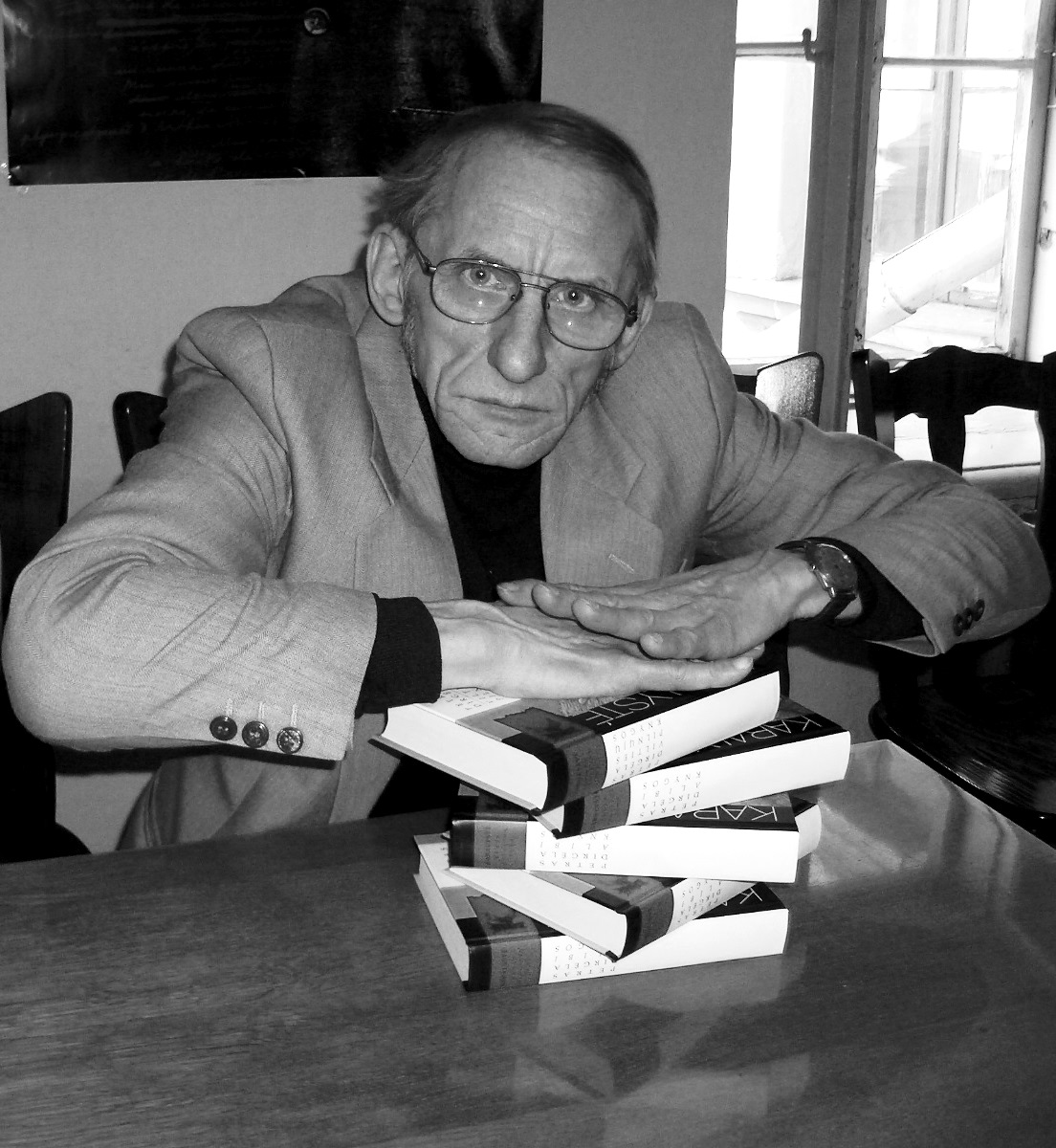
- Born: 21 February 1947; Klaipėda County, Lithuania
- Died: 29 March 2015 (aged 68); Vilnius, Lithuania
- Occupation: Writer
- Writing career
- Notable awards: Lithuanian National Prize for Culture and Arts (2003)

Petras Dirgėla (born 21 February 1947, Klaipeda District, Lithuania; died 29 March 2015, Vilnius, Lithuania) was a Lithuanian writer, a 2003 recipient of the Lithuanian National Prize.

== Bibliography ==
- Mažas vaikelis su senelio lazda (1982), novel
- Kūlgrinda (1984), historical novel
- Joldijos jūra (1987), historical novel
- Vėtrungiškoji dalia: Esė apie literatūrą ir gyvenimą (1986), essay book
- Minijos žemė: Esė apie tėviškę (1988), essay book
- Tranų pasaulis: Esė apie vaikišką meilę namams ir kapams (1990), essay book
- Arkliavagio duktė, film script, together with R. Šavelis
- Karalystė. Žemės keleivių epas:
  - Benamių knygos (1997)
  - Ceremonijų knygos (2002)
  - Vilties pilnųjų knygos (2002)
  - Alibi knygos (2004)
- Begalybės riba (2003) ISBN 9986-879-90-6
- Arklių romansai (2005) ISBN 9986-39-394-9
- Jauno faraono vynuogynuose (2006) ISBN 978-9986-39-537-9

=== Together with his brother, Povilas Dirgėla ===
- Žaibai gęsta rudenį (1971)
- Pasimatymai (1973)
- Aistrų atlaidai (1979)
- Likime, keliauk sau (1976)
- Šalavijų kalnas (1977)
- Pogodalis (1978)
- Šermenų vynas (1980).
