= Pranciška Regina Liubertaitė =

Lithuanian poet and novelist (b. 1950)

- Born: 01 01 1950; Kėdainiai, Lithuania
- Occupations: Writer, poet
- Spouse: Algimantas Žižiūnas
- Writing career
- Notable awards: 2015 2nd degree of the Lithuanian Union of Political Prisoners and Deportees „For merit to Lithuania“

Pranciška Regina Liubertaitė is Lithuanian poet and novelist.

== Early life ==
Liubertaitė was born on January 1, 1950, in the village of Lioliai, the district of Kėdainiai. In 1966 she graduated from the Šėta secondary school of the same district and entered the Faculty of Philology at Vilnius University. In 1972 she graduated from Vilnius University with a diploma of a philologist and a teacher of Lithuanian language and literature.

== Career ==
From 1972 to 1981, she worked as a teacher at the Pabiržė Secondary School, at the Biržai secondary schools No 1 and No 2, at the Public Library and the Department of Culture.

In 1981, she moved to Vilnius. She has been working as a make-up editor for many different institutions and publishing houses in Vilnius.

The first poems appeared in the local press of Kėdainiai and Biržai. Some time later, her first works of prose were published in the XXI amzius, and her poems were published in the weekly Šeimininkė and Šiaurės Atėnai. Around 1998 she became more active in literary and cultural life. Her publications on different cultural and linguistic issues can be found in Dienovidis, Literatūra ir menas, Šiaurės Atėnai, XXI amžius and Lietuvos Aidas.

== Works ==
=== Poetry ===
- Signs of Hope (Vilties ženklai), 2001 – ISBN 9955-422-20-3
- A Forgotten Diary (Uzmirštas dienorastis), 2001 – ISBN 9986-537-87-8
- Walking Only Once on the Earth (Vaikštau tik kartą žeme...), 2002 – ISBN 9986-824-96-6
- Towards White Space (Į baltą erdvę...), 2004 – ISBN 9955-539-18-6
- The Scrapes (Įdrėskimai), Ciklonas – Vilnius, 2006 – ISBN 9955-695-14-5
- 100 Haiku for Vilnius (Šimtas haiku Vilniui), Ciklonas – Vilnius, 2008 – ISBN 978-9955-695-93-6
- The Blinking Glow (Mirksnio švytėjimas), Ciklonas – Vilnius, 2008 – ISBN 978-9955-880-07-3
- Fatal Mirages (Dūžtantys miražai), Ciklonas – Vilnius, 2011 – ISBN 978-9955-880-79-0
- Crochet Embroidery (Siuvinėjimas kryžiuku), Ciklonas – Vilnius, 2014 – ISBN 978-609-8122-10-7/http://www.voruta.lt/arvydas-genys-nebenoriu-daugiau-tos-spalvos/
- Spark to the Earth [A poetry collection] (Žiežirba į žemę), 2016 – ISBN 978-609-420-491-3/https://www.rasyk.lt/knygos/ziezirba-i-zeme/4556.html
- In the Faintness of Shadows (Šešėlių blankumoj), Ciklonas – Vilnius, 2019 – ISBN 978-609-8122-51-0/https://www.rasyk.lt/knygos/seseliu-blankumoj/4591.html
- Love in the hour of silence (Mylėk tylos valandoj), Homoliber – Vilnius, 2021– ISBN 978-609-4462-46-7
- Blooming of flaps [selected lyrics] (Atverčių žydėjimas) [atrinktinė lyrika], Homoliber – Vilnius, 2022 – ISBN 978-609-446-270-2
- Withstanding the winds [selected lyrics] (Atlaikant vėjus) [atrinktinė lyrika], Homoliber – Vilnius, 2023 – ISBN 978-609-446-280-1

=== Novels ===
- By Roads of Memory (Atminties keliais), Vyturys – Vilnius, 2000 – ISBN 5-7900-0812-7
- The Scream (Šauksmas) – Ciklonas – Vilnius, 2005 – ISBN 9955-497-72-6
- Elegy of the Past (Praeities elegija), Ciklonas – Vilnius, 2005 – ISBN 9955-497-78-5
- Remembrance Photos [a fragmented novel] (Nuotraukos atminčiai), Ciklonas – Vilnius, 2009 – ISBN 978-9955-880-57-8
- (No) home Coziness [A novel collection] (Ne) pradingęs namų jaukumas), Ciklonas – Vilnius, 2019 – ISBN 978-609-8122-56-5
- Destiny to be a photographer. Algimantas Žižiūnas: life and creativity (Lemtis būti fotografu. Algimantas Žižiūnas: gyvenimas ir kūryba, – Vilnius, „Homoliber“, 2025 – 304 p. – ISBN 978-609-446-312-9
