= Romualdas Požerskis =

Lithuanian photographer

Romualdas Požerskis (born 7 July 1951, in Vilnius) is a Lithuanian photographer and a 1990 recipient of the Lithuanian National Prize. He attended Kaunas Kaunas Polytechnic Institute from 1969 to 1975 and has been a member of the Lithuanian Union of Art Photographers since 1976.

Požerskis' work has been featured at solo and group exhibitions in Poznań, Poland, at the House of Photography in Plovdiv, Bulgaria, and at the Mala Galerija in Bratislava, Czechoslovakia in 1981, as well as in Tokyo, Berlin, Estonia, Munich, and other international venues. Many of his solo exhibitions have been featured at galleries in Vilnius.

His major works include Victories and Defeats (1974–1976); At a Hospital (1976–1982); Old Towns of Lithuania (1974–1982); Village Festivals (1974–1993); Gardens of Memory (1977–1993); The Last Shelter (1983–1990); Muses (1988–2001); Mirage's Dossier (2002– 2003); and The Little Alfonsas' Miseries and Joys (1992–2003).
