= Paulius Širvys =

Lithuanian poet

- Born: Paulius Širvys; 6 September 1920; Padustėlis, Dusetos volost, Lithuania
- Died: 27 March 1979 (aged 58); Vilnius, Lithuanian SSR
- Occupations: Poet, Editor
- Years active: 1947–1972
- Employer(s): Literatūra ir menas, Genys, Moksleivis desks
- Notable work: Ilgesys – ta giesmė, Ir nusinešė saulę miškai
- Awards: Lithuanian SSR State Prize (1987)

Paulius Širvys (6 September 1920 – 27 March 1979) was a Lithuanian poet.

== Biography ==
Paulius Širvys was born in Padustėlis village (now in Zarasai District Municipality), but soon moved to Degučiai village. After his parents and brother died, Širvys lived with his relatives but later was submitted to children's home. He worked as a cowherd, graduated Salos Agriculture School in 1940. He attended infantry courses in Vilnius in 1940–41. After the Second World War began, Širvys moved to Belarus where he came under arrest as a Nazi prisoner. He managed to escape to Lithuania but again was captured and transferred to East Prussia. He joined the Red Army (the 16th Rifle Division) in 1944 and later was seriously injured.

After the war, Paulius Širvys worked as an editor in several regional newspapers, in 1954–55 worked in Literatūra ir menas. He graduated literature studies in the Maxim Gorky Literature Institute in 1957. After that, he worked as a reporter in magazines Moksleivis and Genys. Širvys left editorial and journalist work in 1967 and became a sailor of the Klaipėda Fishery Fleet.

Most of his life Širvys was resigned to alcoholism.

== Work ==
Early lyrics of Paulius Širvys were dedicated to war experiences and the homeland defense from enemies. This period is marked by social realism aesthetics. Since the selection Beržų lopšinė ('Birch Lullaby', 1961) Širvys moved to the themes of unrequited love, yearning. The poetry of Širvys is romantic, emotional, dramatic, melancholic, close to a ballad, a romance. Širvys uses vivid metaphors, motives of Lithuanian folk songs, many parallelisms, alliterations. He also wrote several books of children's poetry.

His main selections are Beržų lopšinė ('Birch Lullaby', 1961), Ir nusinešė saulę miškai ('...And Forests Took the Sun', 1969), Ilgesys – ta giesmė ('Yearning Is This Song', 1972), also post-mortem anthologies Ir nusinešė saulę miškai ('...And Forests Took the Sun', 1987), Tiesiu toliams rankas ('I Stretch My Hands to the Distance', 1997).

Many of his poems became songs and romances. A poetry award of Paulius Širvys was established in 1995.

== Awards ==
- Lithuanian SSR State Prize in 1973, for selection Ilgesys – ta giesmė ('Yearning Is This Song')
- Poetry Spring in 1973
