= Janina Degutytė =

Lithuanian poet

- Born: 8 July 1928; Kaunas, Lithuania
- Died: 8 February 1990 (aged 61); Vilnius, Lithuania
- Resting place: Antakalnis Cemetery
- Education: State University of Vilnius (1955)
- Occupations: Poet, editor, pedagogue

Janina Degutytė (6 July 1928 in Kaunas – 6 February 1990 in Vilnius) was a Lithuanian poet, best remembered for her children's poems and lyrical poetry in the genres of romance and modernism. Her works were published in Lithuanian and Russian, and subsequently translated into Hungarian and Polish.
