= Sigitas Parulskis =

Lithuanian poet (born 1965)

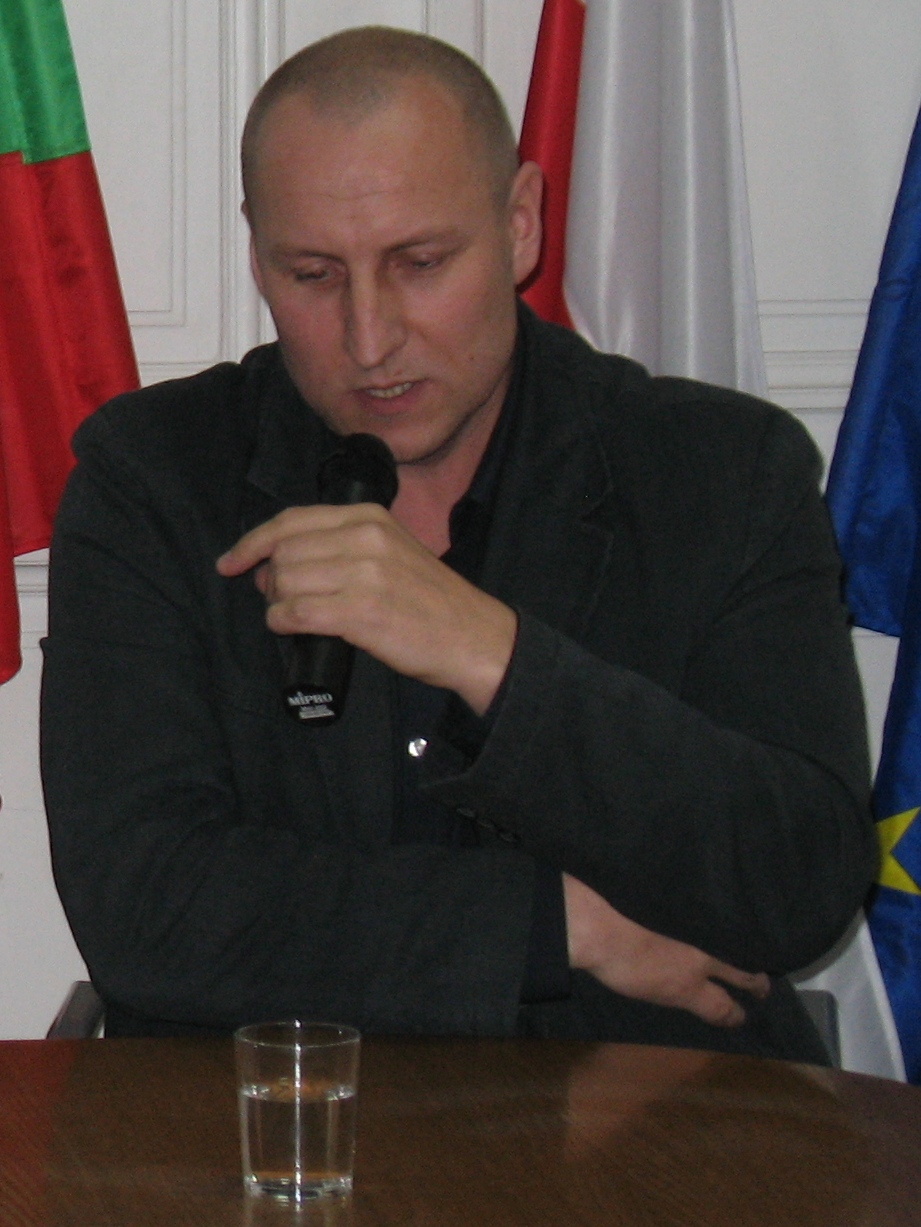
Sigitas Parulskis, Warsaw, October 22, 2008

Sigitas Parulskis (born February 10, 1965, in Obeliai, Rokiškis) is a Lithuanian poet, essayist, playwright and reviewer. In 1990 he graduated from Vilnius University, where he studied Lithuanian language and literature. He has written for notable journals and newspapers in Lithuania (Literatūra ir menas, Lietuvos aidas, Lietuvos rytas, Šiaurės Atėnai). In addition to his writing, Parulskis lectures in creative writing at Vilnius University and writes articles for various newspapers, journals and internet websites.

== Writing career ==
Parulskis has published 16 works including essays and poetry collections, plays, one novel and two screenplays. He is well-known for his ironic, sharp, critical and sometimes provocative writing style.

He has published many short stories on the website www.balsas.lt. They were collected as a book named Sraigė su beisbolo lazda, which got nominated as Best Adult Book in 2007.

His works are translated into Russian, English, Latvian, Finnish, Polish, Czech, French, German, Greek, Swedish and other languages.

He has received all main Lithuanian literature prizes. In 2004 he became the Laureate of National Culture and Art and in 2016 the Baltic Assembly Prize for Literature, the Arts and Science.
