= Lithuanian National Prize for Culture and Arts =

Lithuanian award

- Native name: Nacionalinė kultūros ir meno premija
- Awarded for: Significant achievements in culture and the arts
- Sponsored by: Government of Lithuania
- Date: February 16 (annually)
- Venue: Presidential Palace, Vilnius
- Country: Lithuania
- Presented by: President of Lithuania
- Eligibility: Citizens of Lithuania or members of the Lithuanian World Community
- Rewards: Memorial sign, diploma, and monetary grant (€44,000 / approx. 800 times the basic social benefit)
- Status: Active
- Established: 1989
- First award: 1989
- Winner: 6 annually (since 2006)

Highlights
- Total recipients: 250+ (as of 2025)
- Website: lrkm.lrv.lt/en/

The Lithuanian National Prize for Culture and Arts (Lithuanian: Nacionalinė kultūros ir meno premija), established in 1989, is an award granted for achievements in culture and the arts. It has been awarded annually in six categories since 2006 (between 1989 and 2006 there were nine categories).

== Presentation and ceremonies ==
The prize is formally bestowed on February 16, when the decorations and diplomas are presented to the laureates at Presidential Palace, commemorating the anniversary of the 1918 Act of Independence of Lithuania.

The award honors significant recent achievements in cultural fields and works by artists or art collectives. The honorees may be citizens of Lithuania or members of the Lithuanian World Community. When the award was first established, works accomplished during the previous five years were considered; this period was extended to seven years in 2008. The candidacies are open each year until September 15, and the winners are announced on December 15. Each "Lithuanian National Prize" consists of a memorial sign, a diploma, and a monetary grant (circa 104,000 litas). A single person can only receive the National Prize once.

The candidates for the Prize are now nominated by professional associations and societies; before 2008 the nominations could be made by members of the public. The laureates are selected by a special committee.

As of May 2008 there were 156 laureates of the Prize.

== See also ==
- List of the Recipients of the Lithuanian National Prize
