= Kulesza =

Kulesza (Polish pronunciation: [kuˈlɛʂa]) is a surname of Polish origin.

Notable people with the surname include:

- Agata Kulesza (born 1971), Polish actress
- Beata Sokołowska-Kulesza (born 1974), Polish canoeist
- Cezary Kulesza (born 1962), Polish football executive, player
- Elsa Radowska-Kulesza (born 2008), Polish-Australian author
- Jakub Kulesza (born 1990), Polish politician
- Jolanta Sikorska-Kulesza (born 1957), Polish historian
- Kasia Kulesza (born 1976), Canadian swimmer
- Marek Kulesza (born 1959), Polish cyclist
- Marian Kulesza (1878–1943), Polish-Lithuanian painter
- Marta Pihan-Kulesza (born 1987), Polish gymnast
- Michał Kulesza (1799/1800–1863), Polish-Lithuanian painter and lithographer
- Roman Kulesza (born 1983), Polish artistic gymnast
- Ryszard Kulesza (1931–2008), Polish football player
- Seweryn Kulesza (1900–1983), Polish jockey
- Tomasz Kulesza (born 1959), Polish politician

== See also ==
- Kulesha or Kuleša, alternative spellings
- Kulesh
- Kulish
