= Kulish =

Kulish (Ukrainian: Куліш, Russian: Кули́ш, Polish: Kulisz) is a surname of Ukrainian origin. In the Ukrainian language kulish (куліш) means "millet porridge". The Russian variant of this dish, kulesh (куле́ш, 'kasha, gruel') should be differentiated from kulesha (Ukrainian: кулеша) (maize-flour porridge).

Alternative spellings or transliterations of the surname include Kulisch (German), Kulisz (Polish), and Kuliš (Czech, Serbo-Croatian).

== List of people ==
=== Kulish ===
- Igor Kulish (born 1964), Soviet football goalkeeper
- Karpoor Chandra Kulish (1926–2006), Indian journalist
- Kiril Kulish (born 1994), American actor, singer, and dancer
- Mykola Kulish (1892–1937), Ukrainian writer and film director
- Nicholas Kulish (born 1975), American journalist
- Panteleimon Kulish (1819–1897), Ukrainian writer
- Savva Kulish (1936–2001), Soviet film director
- Serhiy Kulish (born 1993), Ukrainian sport shooter
- Stanislav Kulish (born 1989), Ukrainian footballer
- Volodymyr Kulish (born 1963), Ukrainian politician
- Yuriy Kulish (born 1963), Ukrainian footballer

=== Kulisz (Polish spelling) ===
- Adam Kulisz (born 1966), Polish musician
- Karol Kulisz (1873–1940), Polish Lutheran pastor

=== Kulisch (German spelling) ===
- Angelika Kulisch (born 1989), Polish bicycle racer
- Gustav Adolf Kulisch (1903–?), German politician
- Paul Kulisch (1862–1943), Austrian-German agronomist
- Ulrich W. Kulisch (born 1933), German mathematician

== See also ==
Related & similar surnames

- Kulesh (Russian: Кулеш)
- Kulesha (Кулеша)
- Kuleshin (Кулешин)
- Kuleshov (Кулешов)
- Kulishov (Кулишов)
- Kulisher (Kulischer)
- Kalisz (disambiguation)
- Kalisch (Kallisch), Kalischer
- Kolisch, Kollisch
