= Jan Krzysztof Damel =

Polish neoclassicist artist

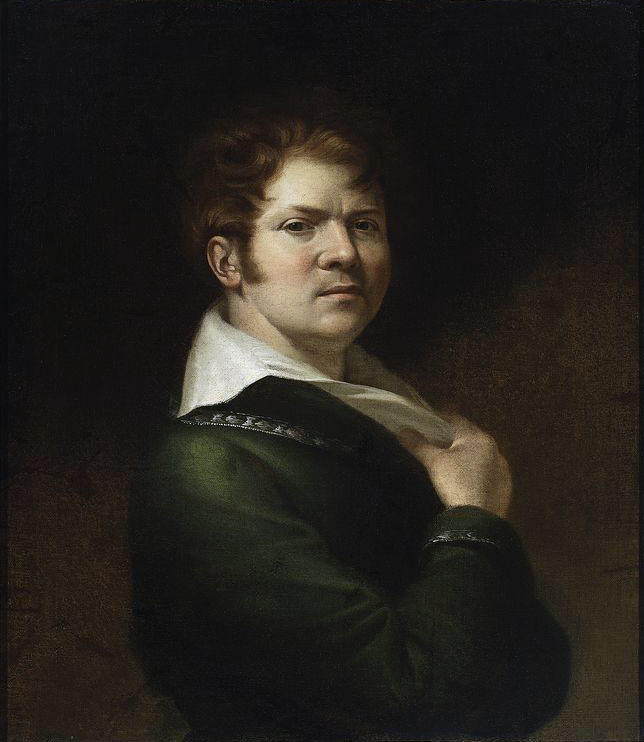
- Self-portrait, 1817
- Born: 1780; Mitau, Duchy of Courland and Semigallia
- Died: 30 August 1840 (aged 59–60); Minsk, Russian Empire

Jan Krzysztof Damel, also known as Jonas Damelis and Johann Damehl in other languages (1780 – 30 August 1840) was a Polish neoclassicist artist in the age of Partitions, associated with the School of Art at Vilnius University (modern-day Lithuania).

== Life ==
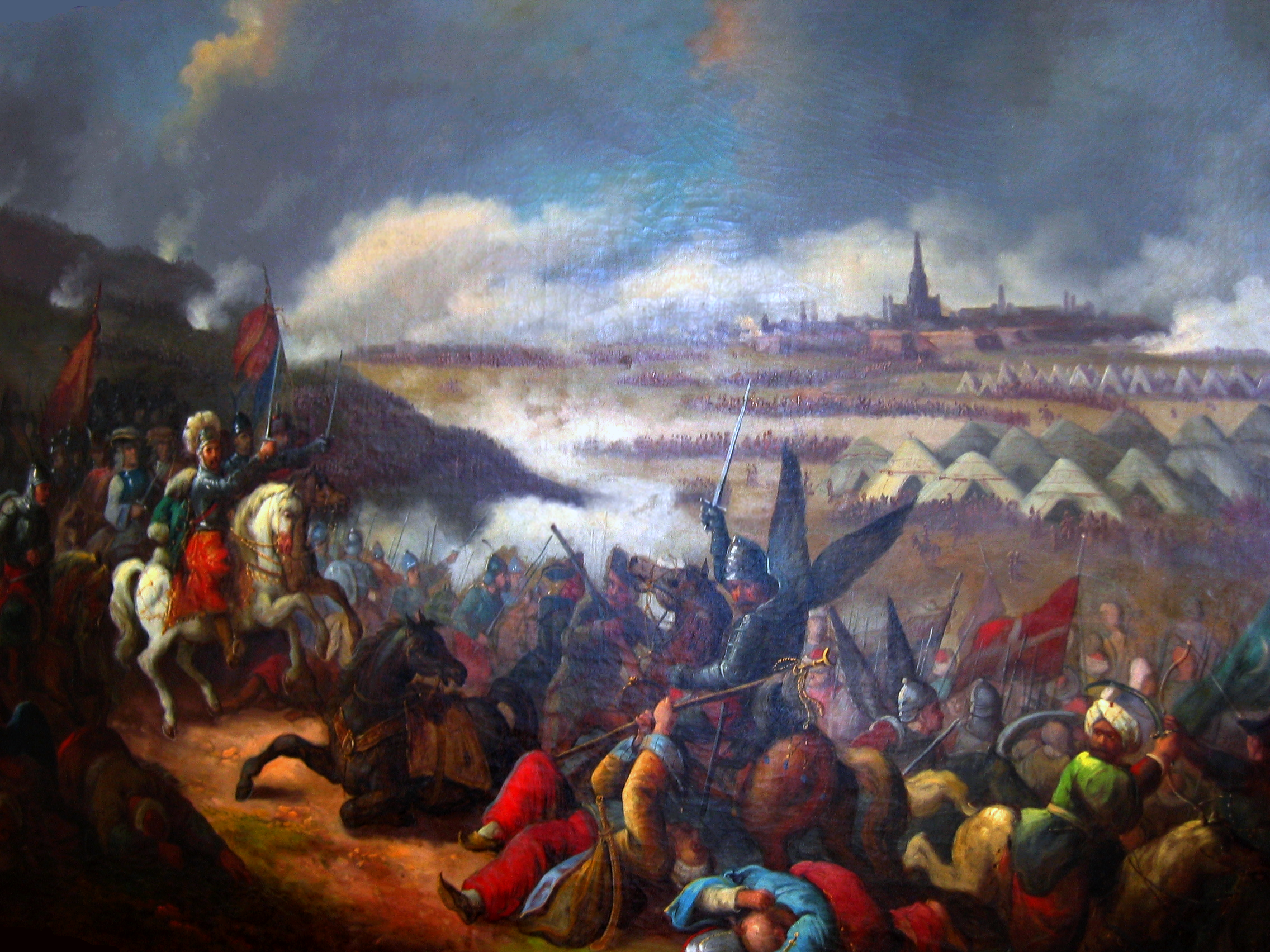
The Battle of Vienna, 1683

Born in Mitau, Duchy of Courland and Semigallia (now Jelgava, Latvia, 1918 name change), Damel (Damelis) studied art at Vilna University under Jan Rustem and Franciszek Smuglewicz, receiving a degree in 1809. He lived in Vilnius (Wilno) until, to accusations of involvement in forgeries by Ignacy Julian Cejzyk, he was convicted and from 1820 to at least 1823 he was in exile in Siberia in Tobolsk. Upon his release he lived in St. Petersburg and Minsk. He is considered one of the most prominent historical artists of the neoclassicist genre working in present-day Belarus.

His works include paintings of historic events (the Kościuszko Uprising, Napoleon's army in Vilnius, the death of Ulrich von Jungingen during the Battle of Grunwald, and the Battle of Vienna), portraits, drawings, and religious compositions. Among his successful students was Michał Kulesza.
