= Kulesa =

Kulesa may refer to:

- Kulesa, Kenya, a settlement in south-eastern Kenya
- Kuleša, the Lithuanian spelling of Kulesza and Kulesha
  - Marijonas Kuleša
  - Mykolas Kuleša
