= Joseph Saunders (engraver) =

English engraver

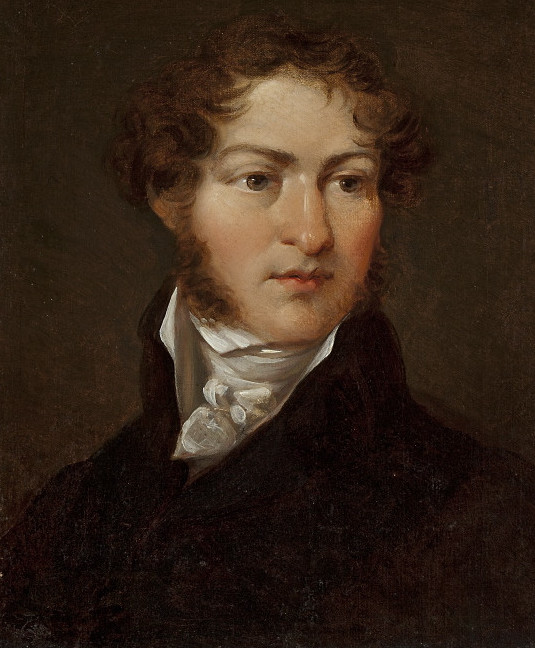
- Joseph Saunders, oil by Jan Rustem from the National Museum, Warsaw
- Born: 1773; London, England
- Died: 30 December 1853 (aged 79–80); Kremenets, Russian Empire (now Ukraine)
- Education: Pietro Longhi
- Known for: Engraving, art history, literature
- Patrons: Tsar Paul I, Adam Jerzy Czartoryski

Joseph Saunders, (Polish: Józef Saunders), sometimes also Joseph Sanders (1773 – 30 December 1853), was an English engraver, illustrator, publisher and professor of fine art. He was active in London, Saint Petersburg and Wilno. He has sometimes become conflated with the London painter and miniaturist, Joseph Saunders (b. ca.1750). Professor Anthony Cross suggests a further confusion with a 'John Saunders', born 1750, who also went to Russia.

== Career ==
Nothing substantive is currently known about Saunders' early life in London. He appears to have travelled to the Russian Imperial court at the invitation of the Russian ambassador to the Kingdom of Great Britain, Semyon Vorontsov. He arrived in Russia some time between 1794 and 1796 in the footsteps of an earlier English engraver, James Walker already working there, and became "imperial engraver" c. 1802. Saunders was also named "Historical Court Engraver" at the Hermitage. On 18 August 1800, he became a member of the Saint Petersburg Academy of Arts. He was also a member of the Stockholm Arts Academy. He opened his own school of engraving in St. Petersburg. He developed his work as an illustrator to a number of poets.

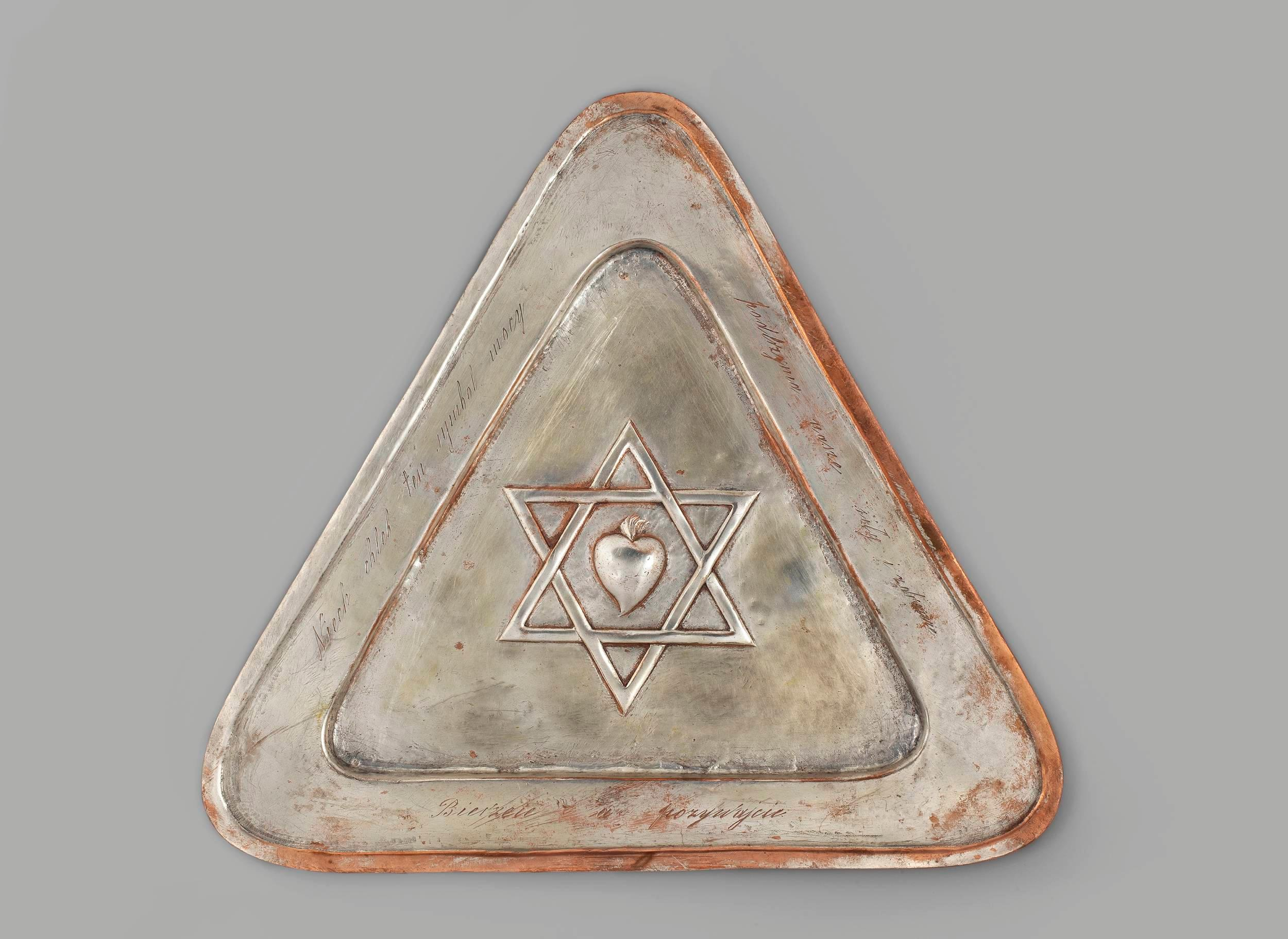
Bread Paten of the "Gorliwy Litwin" Masonic lodge

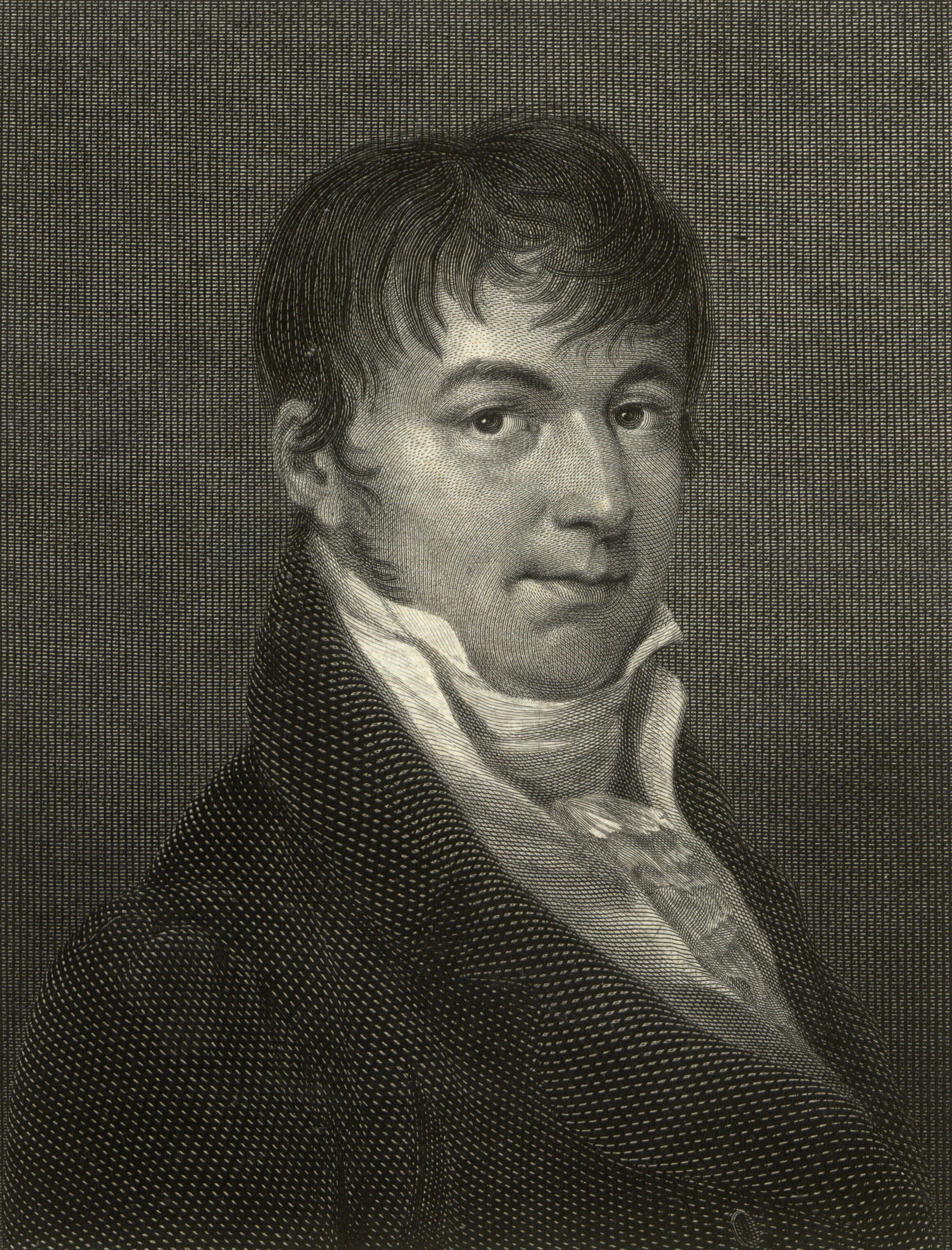
1819 Saunders etching of Professor Niszkowski, after Jan Rustem

In 1810, on the initiative of Adam Jerzy Czartoryski, he became Professor of Fine Art at Wilno University in succession to Franciszek Smuglewicz, where he lectured in French on the history of art and English literature. He initiated drawing classes and emphasised the importance of engraving as the most "social" of all the arts. He supported the study of national arts and the conservation of art objects. During his Wilno period he concentrated on teaching and publishing and therefore his output as an engraver was small. It included Minerva and a bust of Jan Jakub Zamoyski, portraits of the Polish–Armenian painter, Jan Rustem, (protégé of Adam Kazimierz Czartoryski) and illustrations for an edition of Tales of One Thousand and One Nights. He published the Magnetic Diary, a collection of his poetry in English, with Polish translation. Saunders joined the Dedicated Lithuanian ("Gorliwy Litwin"), Masonic lodge in Vilnius, whose secretary and friend of Saunders was the literary critic and Polish translator of John Milton, Leon Borowski (krytyk literacki). In a publication celebrating 200 years of art history begun at Wilno University, Jerzy Malinowski has characterised Saunders' academic role as follows:

... Lectures in this field were undertaken only after Smuglewicz died, by his successor to the post of head of the Section of Fine Arts, Joseph (Józef) Saunders in 1810 (fig. 1.1, a bas-relief medallion portrait of Joseph Saunders by his pupil, Wincenty Smokowski). He designed the curriculum for teaching the history of art at university level. The syllabus of his lectures included an overview of art from ancient Egypt, through Greece and Rome, to a broad analysis of contemporary European art, including that of Scandinavia, Poland, and Russia. He delivered lectures on extra-European, i.e. Indian, Persian and Jewish art, as well as English literature. In 1810, Saunders first used the term "Romantic" in Poland. He taught the Polish Romantic poets and painters who studied at his faculty.

In 1818 he took a sabbatical for health reasons and travelled to Italy with his assistant, Antoni Pilecki. He stayed in Florence and Pisa as guest of the exiled Polish statesman, Michał Kleofas Ogiński. While in Tuscany, he produced prints after Antonio Canova, and works by Bertel Thorwaldsen and Vittorio Alfieri. In 1821 he retired from his university position, where he was succeeded by Jan Rustem, and from 1822 lived for two years in Odesa. Thereafter he went back to Florence. Upon learning of his son's death in 1839, he returned to Wilno. He himself died many years later in the winter of 1853–4 according to an inscription found on a gravestone in the former Basilian cemetery in Kremenets. Although the date is 1 January 1854, some sources state he died on 30 December 1853. More generally his death is dated 1845.

== Personal life ==
Saunders married Antonina Zofia Reichel, the daughter of another engraver, Jan Jakub Reichel. They had three surviving children. Their son, William, was born in London on 24 April 1794 and died on 10 August 1839 in Wilno. He had been a high ranking state official in Wilno Voivodeship. There were two daughters, Antonina Sarah (b. 1808) who married count Leon Krasicki, and Julia (b. 1809).

== Works ==
Saunders is known to have produced a number of important engravings during the reign of Tsar Paul I. Among these were a reproduction of Roman Charity after Guido Reni, published in 1799 and a portrait of Tsar Paul, entitled Paul Premier (Emperor of Russia) now part of the British Royal Collection. He contributed 48 of the 75 engravings of imperial portraits after Lampi and Gérard in the two volume edition of La Galerie de l'Hermitage. There are 9 historical portraits associated with one or more engravers called "Joseph Saunders" ranging from 1772 to 1807 at the National Portrait Gallery, London. In 1815 Saunders published a paper on the life and work of Polish baroque painter, Szymon Czechowicz.
