= Kalozha Church =

Church in Grodno, Belarus

Coordinates: 53°40′41.32″N 23°49′08.31″E

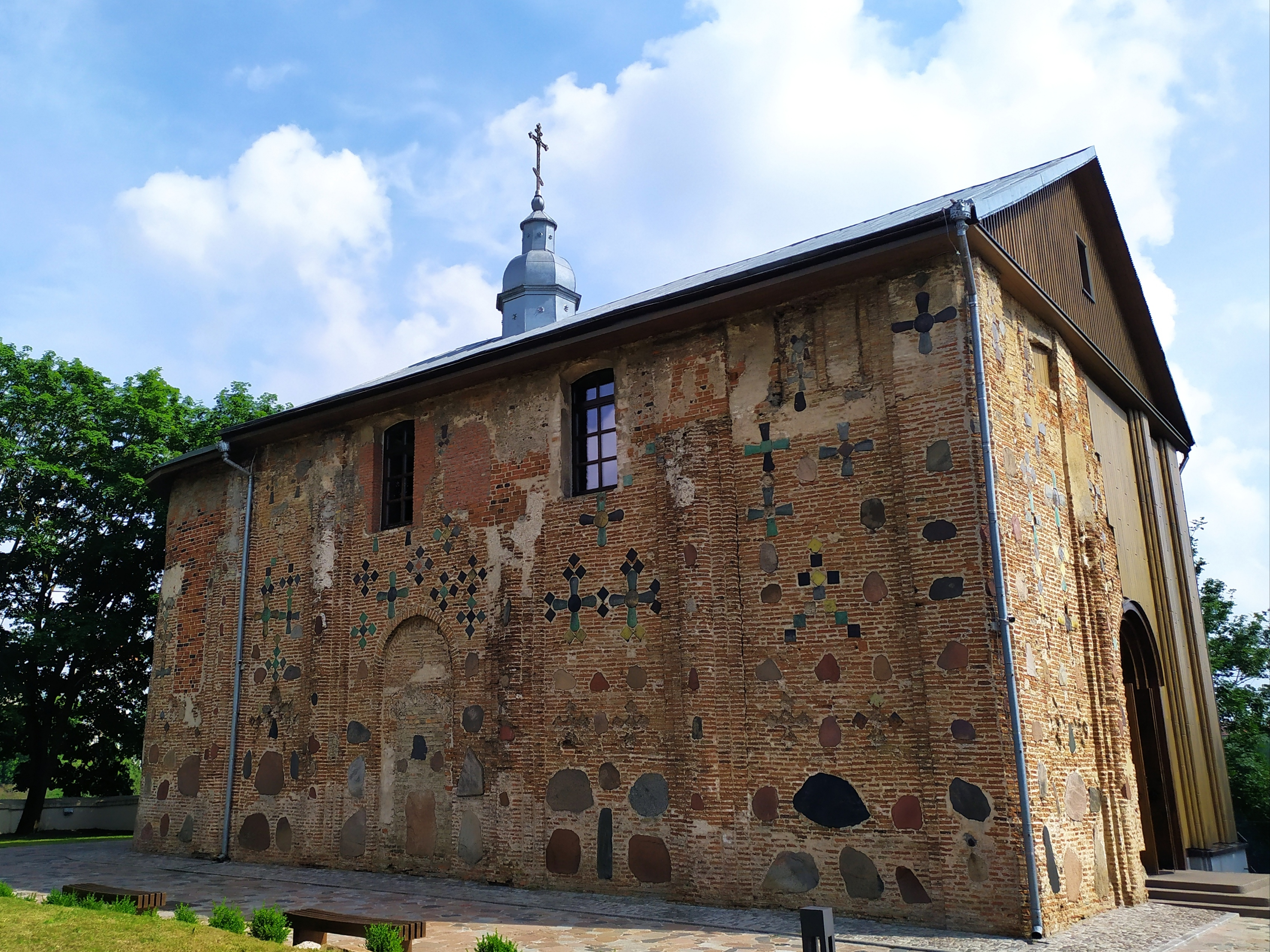
Kalozha Church

The Kalozha Church of Sts. Boris and Gleb (Note: Belarusian: Каложская царква, Царква Св. Барыса і Глеба, romanized: Kałožskaja carkva, Carkva Sv. Barysa i Hleba; Russian: Борисоглебская церковь, Коложская церковь, romanized: Borisoglebskaya tserkov, Kolozhskaya tserkov.) is the oldest extant structure in Grodno, Belarus. It is the only surviving monument of ancient Black Ruthenian architecture, distinguished from other Orthodox churches by prolific use of polychrome faceted stones of blue, green or red tint which could be arranged to form crosses or other figures on the wall.

== Architecture ==
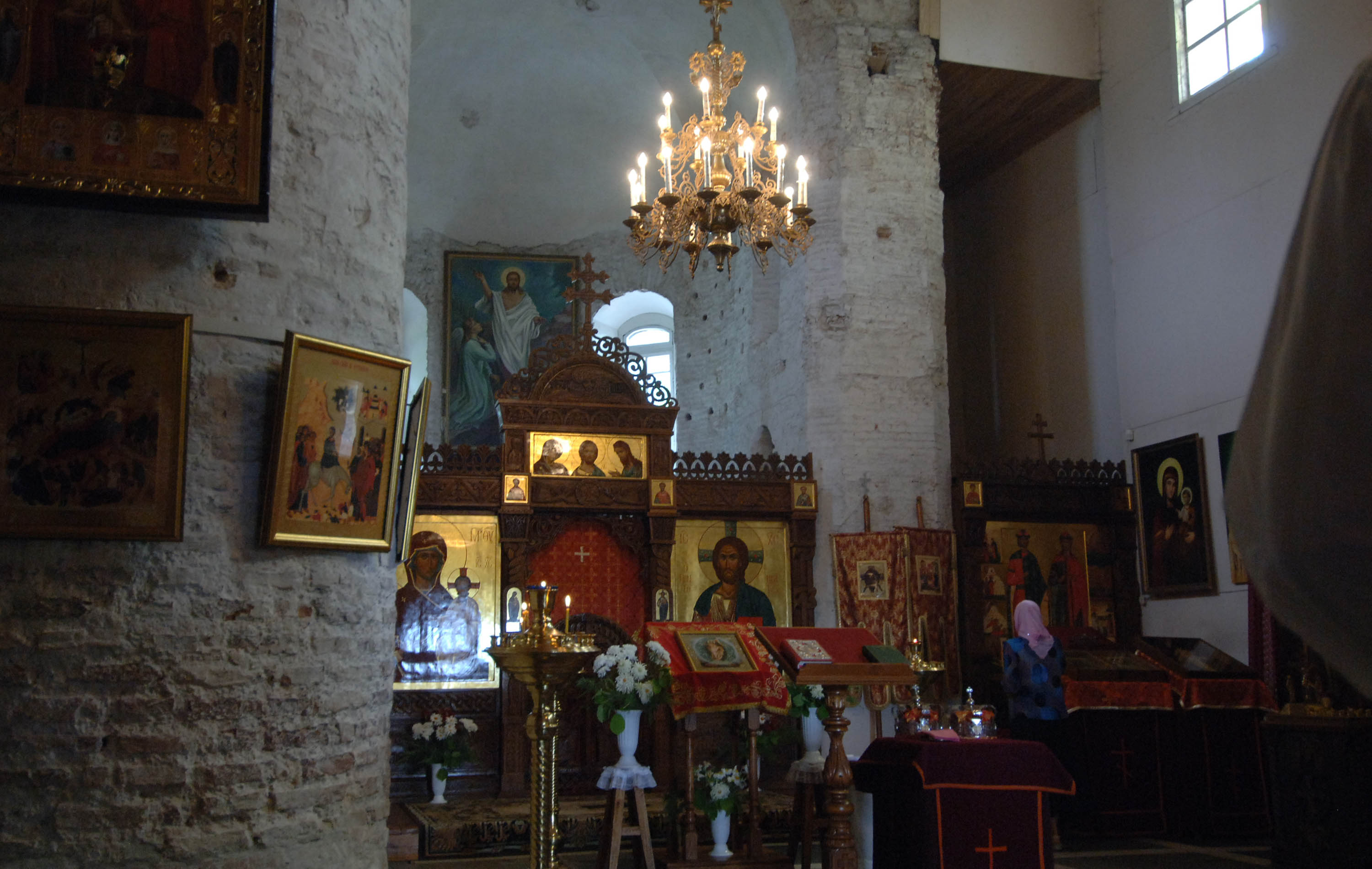
Interior of the church decorated for a wedding

The church is a cross-domed building supported by six circular pillars. The outside is articulated with projecting pilasters, which have rounded corners, as does the building itself. The ante-nave contains the choir loft, accessed by a narrow gradatory in the western wall. Two other stairs were discovered in the walls of the side apses; their purpose is not clear. The floor is lined with ceramic tiles forming decorative patterns. The interior was lined with innumerable built-in pitchers, which usually serve in Eastern Orthodox churches as resonators but in this case were scored to produce decorative effects. For this reason, the central nave has never been painted.

== History ==
The church was built before 1183 and survived intact, depicted in the 1840s by Michał Kulesza, until 1853, when the south wall collapsed, due to its perilous location on the high bank of the Neman. During restoration works, some fragments of 12th-century frescoes were discovered in the apses by the architectural historian, Vasiliy Griaznov. Remains of four other churches in the same style, decorated with pitchers and coloured stones instead of frescoes, were discovered in Grodno and Vaŭkavysk. They all date back to the turn of the 13th century, as do remains of the first stone palace in the Old Grodno Castle.

In 2004, the church was included in the Tentative List of UNESCO's World Heritage Sites.
