= Kalisz (disambiguation) =

Kalisz is a city in central Poland.

Kalisz may also refer to:

- Kalisz (surname)
- Kalisz, Masovian Voivodeship, east-central Poland
- Kalisz, Pomeranian Voivodeship, north Poland
- Kalisz Pomorski, a small town in West Pomeranian Voivodeship, north-west Poland
- WSK-Kalisz, the Polish aircraft engine maker PZL

== Other uses ==
- Kalisz County, a county (powiat) east of Kalisz
- Kalisz Department, a former subdivision of the Duchy of Warsaw 1807–1815
- Kalisz Voivodeship (disambiguation)

== See also ==
- Kalish (disambiguation)
- Kalisch (disambiguation)
- Kaliski (disambiguation)
