= Wincenty Smokowski =

Polish-Lithuanian painter and illustrator

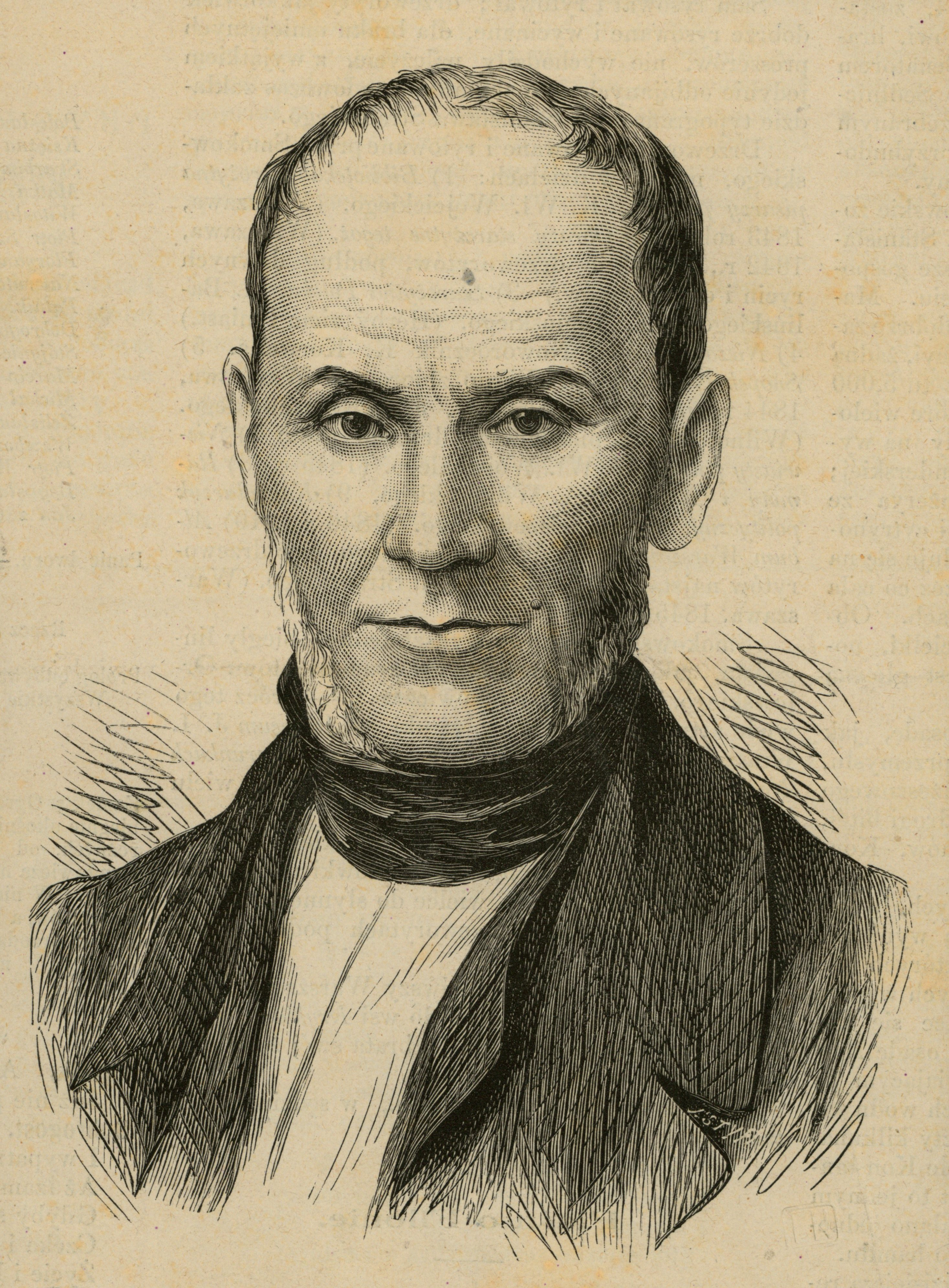
Smokowski in 1876

Wincenty Smokowski (Lithuanian: Vincentas Smakauskas; 19 February 1797 – 13 February 1876) was a Polish-Lithuanian painter and illustrator in the Academic and Classical styles. He created portraits, historical scenes, landscapes and genre works; notably realistic, unprejudiced portrayals of Jews and Gypsies.

== Biography ==
He was born in Vilnius. From 1817 to 1822, he studied at Vilnius University where he was a pupil of the English engraver and professor of Fine Art, Joseph Saunders. From 1823 to 1829, he continued at the Imperial Academy of Arts in Saint Petersburg. He was awarded a silver medal in 1825 and a gold medal in 1827 for his version of the death of Epaminondas.

In 1829, he was invited by Jan Rustem to become an assistant professor at the university. He held that position until 1832, when the university was closed by Russian authorities.

In 1836, he graduated from the "Vilnius Medico-Surgical Academy" and worked as a doctor in the area around Švenčionys from 1841 to 1856. After two years in Warsaw, he practiced medicine from his wife's estate at Krikonys, a small village in the Ignalina region.

In addition to his paintings, he provided illustrations for Konrad Wallenrod (1828) and Pan Tadeusz (1860) by Adam Mickiewicz and the poem Anafielas (1846) by Józef Ignacy Kraszewski. He is also known for copying and helping to preserve the 15th century frescoes at Trakai Island Castle.

Smokowski died in 1876 in Krikonys, Ignalina Raion. A street is named after him in the Pašilaičiai district of Vilnius.

== Selected paintings ==
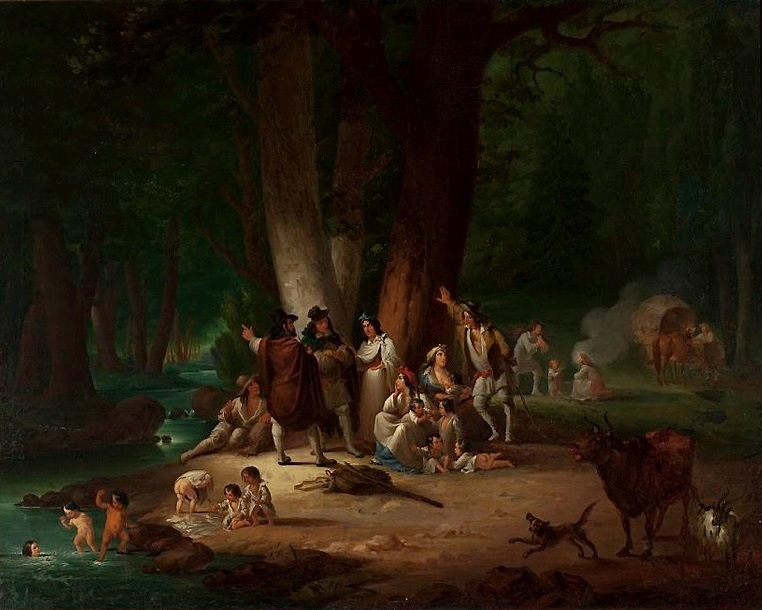
Gypsy Encampment by a Creek

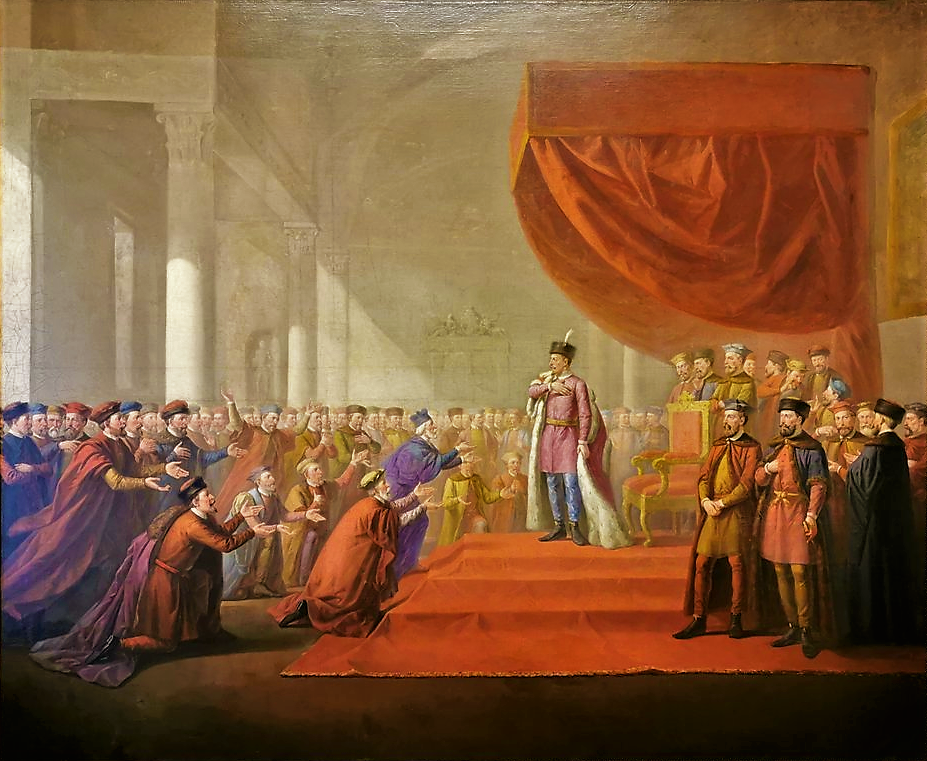
Stephen Bathory founding the
Vilnius Academy

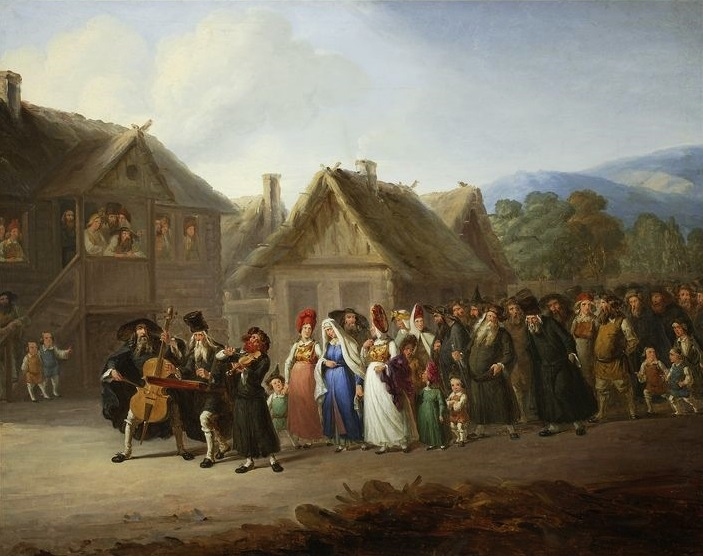
Jewish Wedding

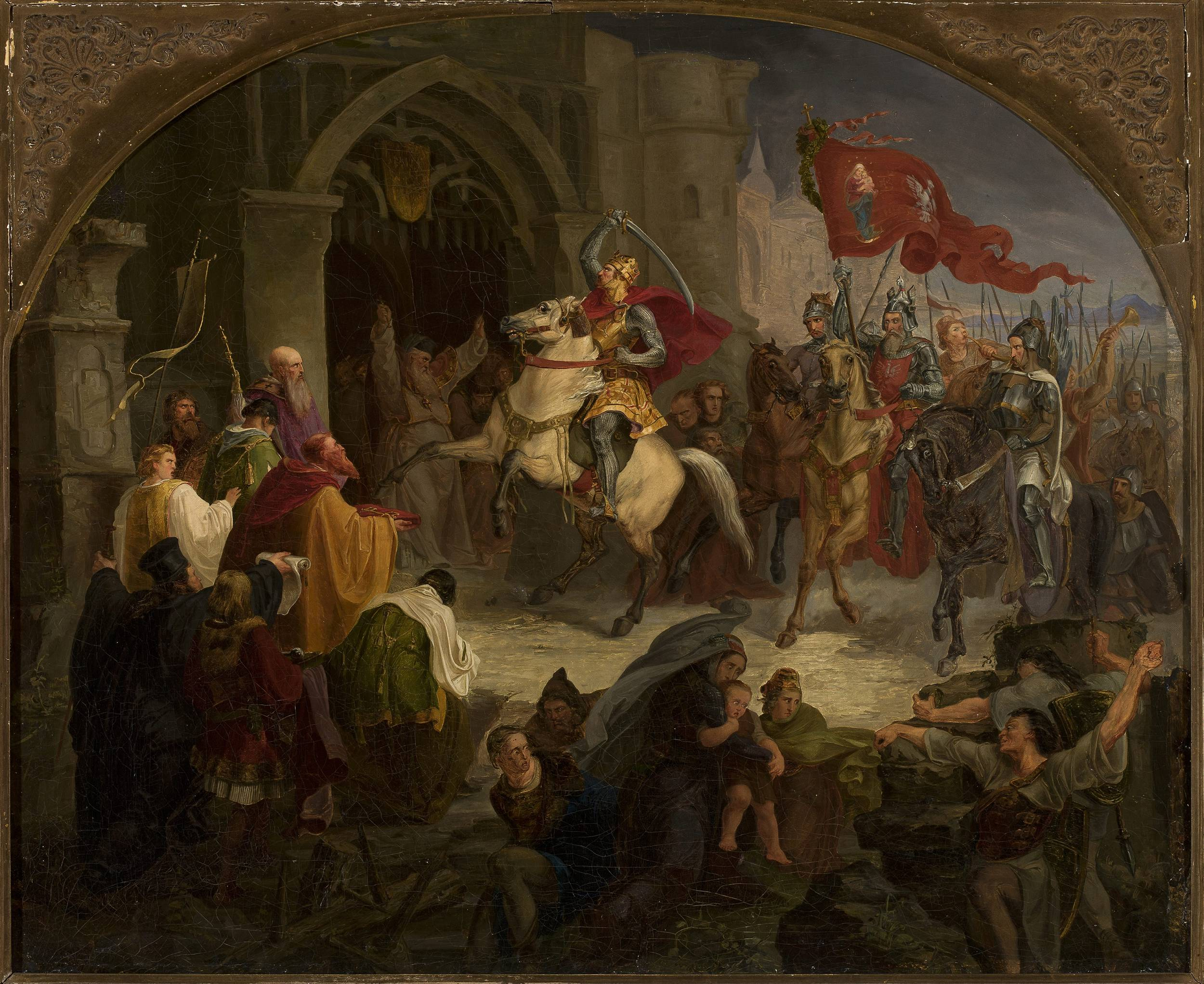
Entry of Bolesław the Brave into Kiev
