= Kulis =

Kulis may refer to:

- Kulis (surname), a family name
- Kulis Air National Guard Base, a facility in Anchorage, Alaska
