= Trutnev =

Trutnev (Russian: Трутнев) is a Russian masculine surname, its feminine counterpart is Trutneva. It may refer to

- Ivan Trutnev (1827–1912), was a Russian painter
- Yury Trutnev (born 1956), Russian politician
- Yuri Trutnev (scientist) (1927–2021), Russian physicist
