= Kulesh =

The surname Kulesh (Belarusian: Кулеш) may refer to:

- Daria Kulesh, lead vocalist of Kara (British band)
- Ivan Kulesh (1986–2016), Belarusian serial killer
- Uladzislau Kulesh (born 1996), Belarusian handball player

== See also ==
- Kulesha, a surname
- Kulish, a surname
