= Grog (clay) =

Type of temper used in clay

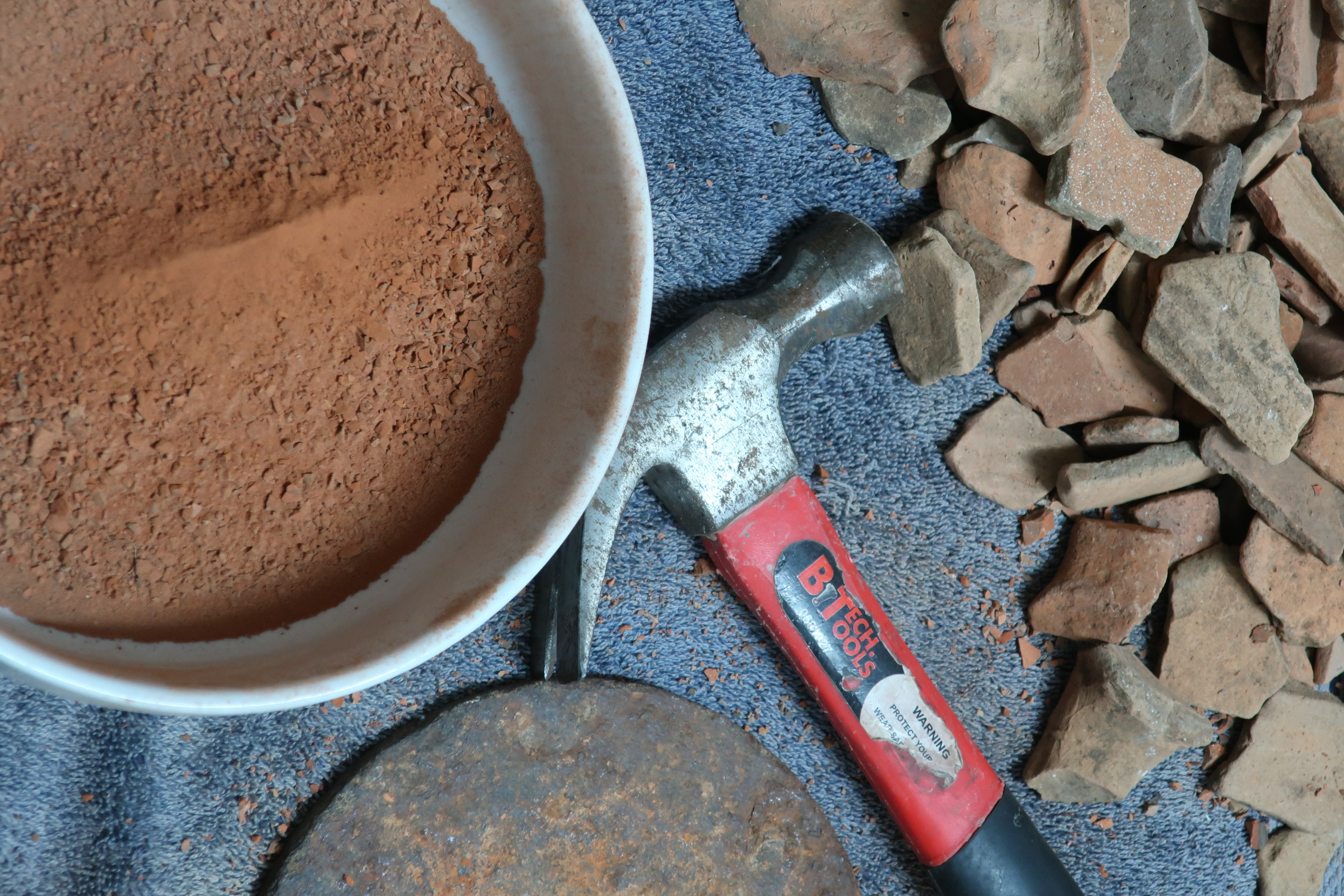
Grog, temper for clay

Grog, also known as firesand and chamotte, is a raw material usually made from crushed and ground potsherds, reintroduced into crude clay to temper it before making ceramic ware. It has a high percentage of silica and alumina.

It is normally available as a powder or chippings, and is an important ingredient in Coade stone.

== Production ==
It can be produced by firing selected fire clays to high temperatures before grinding and screening to specific particle sizes. An alternate method of production uses pitchers. The particle size distribution is generally coarser in size than the other raw materials used to prepare clay bodies. It tends to be porous and have low density.

== Properties ==
Grog is composed of 40% minimum alumina, 30% minimum silica, 4% maximum iron(III) oxide, up to 2% calcium oxide and magnesium oxide combined.

Its melting point is approximately 1,780 °C (3,240 °F). Its water absorption is maximum 7%. Its thermal expansion coefficient is 5.2 mm/m and thermal conductivity is 0.8 W/(m·K) at 100 °C and 1.0 W/(m·K) at 1000 °C. It is not easily wetted by steel.

== Applications ==
Grog is used in pottery and sculpture to add a gritty, rustic texture called "tooth"; it reduces shrinkage and aids even drying. This prevents defects such as cracking, crows feet, patterning, and lamination. The coarse particles open the green clay body to allow gases to escape. Grog adds structural strength to hand-built and thrown pottery during shaping, although it can diminish fired strength.

The finer the particles, the closer the clay bond, and the denser and stronger the fired product. "The strength in the dry state increases with grog down as fine as that passing the 100-mesh sieve, but decreases with material passing the 200-mesh sieve." About 20% grog is added to crude clay (in the dry form) before mixing with water. Adding grog to clay serves two primary functions: 1) It helps prevent cracking of the clay when the ceramic piece is being worked and when it dries, by reducing its plasticity; 2) it protects the ceramic piece from thermal shock while firing, particularly, at the sudden rise or lowering of temperature, and which, if not added, can cause breakage. Substitutes for grog used in pottery are dried and sifted horse manure, or sand collected from dry riverbeds (which has been sifted through a screen), or finely ground schist. Others make use of volcanic ash. Some natural clays already contain an admixture of some "natural temper," for which cause the potters who make use of the clay do not add any temper of their own.

In Middle and South Europe, grog is used to create fire-resistant chamotte type bricks and mortar for construction of fireplaces, old-style and industrial furnaces, and as component of high temperature application sealants and adhesives.

A typical example of domestic use is a pizza stone made from chamotte. Because the stone can absorb heat, you can bake pizza or bread on the stone in a regular domestic oven. The advantage is supposed to be a more even heat. A normal commercial domestic oven cools down when the door is opened. The stone however remains hot, creating a more even bake. Another advantage is the fact that the stone can absorb some moisture making for a drier bake.

== Archaeology ==
In archaeology, "grog" is crushed, fired pottery of any type that is added as a temper to unfired clay. Several pottery types from the European Bronze Age are typologized on the basis of their grog inclusions. The practice of adding grog to clay as a temper was widespread throughout many cultures and is mentioned in the writings of Hai Gaon (939–1038), who wrote in his commentary on the Mishnah, compiled in 189 CE: "ḥarsit [= grog], that which they grind [of potsherds] and make therewith clay is called [in Hebrew] ḥarsit."

== See also ==
- Grogg
