= Kolisch =

Kolisch is the surname of the following people:

- Gertrud Kolisch Schoenberg (1898–1967), Austrian opera librettist
- Ignác Kolisch (1837–1889), Hungarian chess player
- Rudolf Kolisch (1896–1978), Austrian-American musician, founder of the Kolisch Quartet
- Rudolf Rafael Kolisch (1867-1922), Czech-Austrian physician, researcher and professor, father of Rudolf Kolisch

== See also ==
- Kalisch (disambiguation)
