= Ivan Trutnev =

Russian painter

- Иван Петрович Трутнев
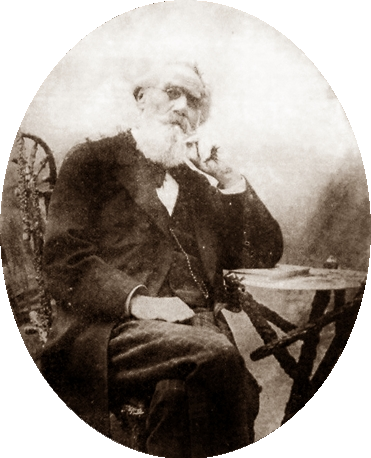
- Trutnev (1908)
- Born: 1827; Likhvin, Kaluga Governorate, Russian Empire
- Died: February 5, 1912 (aged 84–85); Vilnius, Vilna Governorate, Russian Empire
- Education: Member Academy of Arts (1868)
- Alma mater: Imperial Academy of Arts
- Known for: Painting
- Awards: Big Gold Medal of the Imperial Academy of Arts (1858)

Ivan Petrovich Trutnev (Russian: Ива́н Петро́вич Тру́тнев; 1827, in Likhvin – 18 February 1912, in Vilnius) was a Russian painter and art teacher.

== Biography ==
He was born into a peasant family but, in 1845, was able to gain admission to the Stroganov Moscow State University of Arts and Industry. Four years later, he graduated with an art teaching certificate. From 1851 to 1858, he continued his studies at the Imperial Academy of Arts with Bogdan Willewalde. At an exhibition in 1854, one of his paintings was purchased by Tsar Nicholas I. He also acquired a patron; businessman and philanthropist Vasily Kokorev.

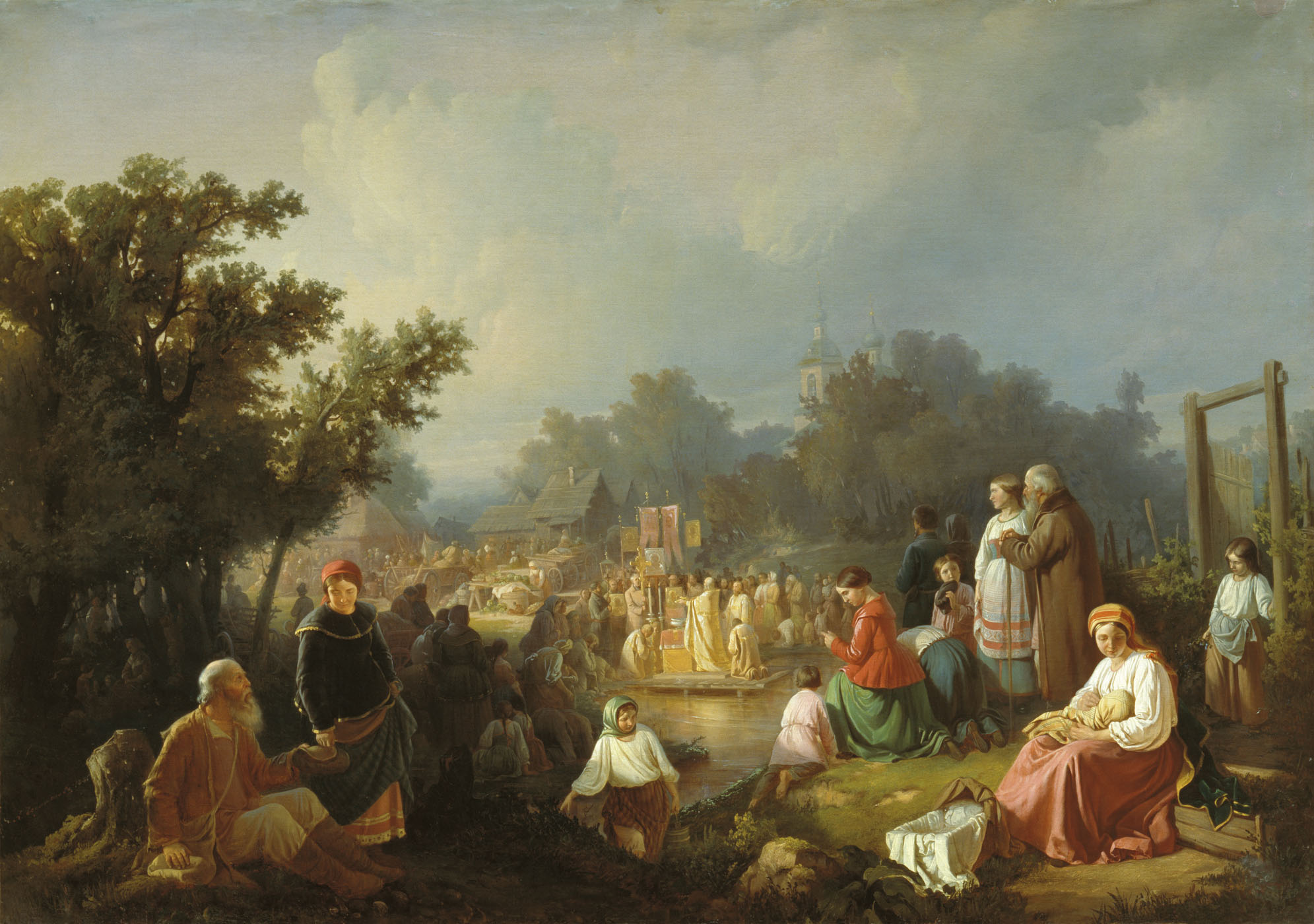
Village Procession of the Cross (1858)

His graduating piece, Village Procession of the Cross was awarded a gold medal. This came with a stipend to study abroad for up to six years. From 1860 to 1865, he travelled throughout Europe, visiting Vienna, Paris, Dresden and Amsterdam, while doing errands for the famous art collector Pavel Tretyakov. He spent two years in Rome, then grew tired of travelling and returned home.

=== Invitation to Vilnius ===
In 1866, he became a teacher of drawing and calligraphy at the Gymnasium in Vitebsk. Later that year, he was contacted by the trustees of the Vilnius School District and invited to organize an art school there. Apparently, it had been nearly impossible to find good, local, painters to do Eastern Orthodox Church icons and murals since Vilnius University was closed in 1831. He moved to Vilnius and immediately began teaching a wide variety of art-related topics at several schools. At that time, he also began participating in exhibitions held by the Peredvizhniki. In 1868, he became an Academician.

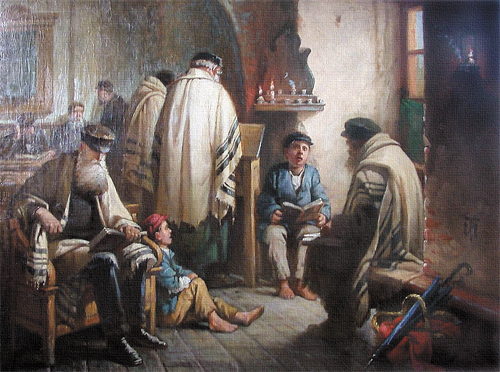
Jews at Prayer (1911)

Over the next few years, in addition to teaching, he created numerous religious works and portraits of well-known academics and politicians, together with a wide selection of genre scenes. In 1897, he collaborated with the sculptor Matvey Chizhov and the architectural historian Vasiliy Griaznov to create a monument for Mikhail Muravyov in Vilnius. He also created a large number of icons for nearby areas, as well as Minsk, Lublin and Warsaw.

By the time of his death, his art school had been attended by almost 4,000 students, 193 of whom graduated and went on to the Imperial Academy or other institutions in Russia and abroad. He was also active in cultural and philanthropical affairs and was the recipient of numerous state awards, such as the Orders of St. Vladimir and St. Anna. He painted very little during his last years, due to failing eyesight.
