= Kalischer =

Kalischer, also Kalisher or Kaliszer, is a Jewish surname (meaning literally "from Kalisz"). Notable people with the surname include:

== People ==
=== Kalischer ===
- Clemens Kalischer (1921–2018), German photographer in reportage and art photography
- Peter Kalischer (1915–1991), American journalist
- Salomon Kalischer (1845–1924), German composer, pianist, and physicist
- Zvi Hirsch Kalischer (1795–1874), German rabbi and Zionist leader

=== Kalisher ===
- Jesse Kalisher (1962–2017), American art photographer
- Reuven Kalisher (1828–1896), Jewish doctor
- Simpson Kalisher (1926–2023), American photojournalist

== See also ==
- Kalisch
