= Kalish =

Kalish may refer to:

- Kalish (Farscape), a fictional humanoid species
- Kalush, Ukraine or Kalish, Ukraine
- Kalisz or Kalish, Greater Poland
- Kalish, a color in the ultraviolet range seen by Klingons in the Star Trek novel Pawns and Symbols

== People with the surname Kalish ==
- Al Kelly (born Abraham Kalish; 1896–1966), American comedian
- Austin Kalish (1921–2016), American producer and screenwriter
- Bruce Kalish (born 1952), American television writer
- Donald Kalish (1919–2000), American logician and pacifist
- Gilbert Kalish (born 1935), American pianist
- Irma Kalish (1924–2021), American television producer and screenwriter
- Israel Yitzhak Kalish (1779–1848), first Hasidic Rebbe of Warka
- Jake Kalish (born 1991), American baseball player
- Ken Kalish, video game writer
- Max Kalish (1891–1945), American sculptor
- Ryan Kalish (born 1988), American major league baseball player
- Shaindel Kalish (1910–2002), American actress
- Shimon Sholom Kalish (1882–1954), the Hasidic Rebbe of Amshinov–Otvotsk
- Sophie Tucker (née Kalish; 1886–1966), Ukrainian-American singer, comedian, and actress

== See also ==
- Kalisch (disambiguation)
- Kalisz (disambiguation)
