= Kalisz Voivodeship =

Kalisz Voivodeship may also refer to:

- Kalisz Voivodeship (1314–1793)
- Kalisz Voivodeship (1816–1837)
- Kalisz Voivodeship (1975–1998)
