= Kara (British band) =

British band

KARA

Background information
- Origin: UK/ Russia
- Genres: Acoustic folk
- Years active: 2013–2017
- Past members: Daria Kulesh (lead vocals), Ben Honey (guitar), Gary Holbrook (accordion), Phil Underwood (melodeon, vocals), Pete Morton (guitar, vocals), Kate Rouse (hammered dulcimer, vocals).
- Website: Kara

Kara was a folk music group from Hertfordshire, England, whose music has been called "spirited acoustic folk with a Russian twist". Their debut album, Waters So Deep, was acclaimed by The Daily Telegraph.

== Personnel ==
The latest line-up members were Daria Kulesh (lead vocals), Phil Underwood (melodeon, vocals), Pete Morton (guitar, vocals) and Kate Rouse (hammered dulcimer, vocals). Kara's lead vocalist, Daria Kulesh, was born in Russia. She has been described as "always deliver[ing] lyrics that expose untainted sincerity with a voice that pours out their spirit".

== Albums by Kara ==
=== Waters So Deep ===
Kara's debut album, Waters So Deep, produced by Jason Emberton and released on 1 July 2014, was one of The Daily Telegraph 's ten folk music highlights for autumn 2014. The Telegraph's reviewer, Martin Chilton, described it as "an interesting debut" with "impressive energy", and said that the album incorporates influences from Russia, England, Ireland and France. Rebekah Foard, for Bright Young Folk, said that many of the songs on the album "explore belief, spirituality and temptation, often giving the tracks a deeply mythical feel. The main influences are Russian and British folk traditions but tracks such as In Lille – where French context is teamed with a beautiful Venezuelan Waltz – highlight the international flavour of the band’s music". Dai Jeffries, for Folking.com, described the album's sound as "decidedly pan-European".

=== Some Other Shore ===
Their second album, Some other Shore, was released on 3 June 2016. Also produced by Jason Emberton, it includes contributions from James Delarre on fiddle and Lukas Drinkwater on double bass. Andy McMillan, reviewing it for Bright Young Folk, described it as "an exceptionally fine and enjoyable album full of contrasts and carefully crafted and delivered".

== Albums by Daria Kulesh ==
Daria Kulesh
- Born: Russia
- Origin: UK/ Russia
- Genres: singer-songwriter
- Instrument: vocal
- Years active: 2014–present
- Labels: Folkstock Records
- Website: Daria Kulesh

=== Eternal Child ===
Daria Kulesh released her solo debut album, Eternal Child, on 31 January 2015. It was produced by Ben Walker. He plays piano, accordion, ukulele, keyboards, bass, guitar and mandolin on the album, which also features Kate Rouse, Kaity Rae, Luke Jackson and Charlie Deakin Davies.

Eternal Child was Blues and Roots Radio's Album of the Week on 24 January 2015, one of Paul Mansell's albums of the week on Radio Marlow FM 97.5 and Album of the Month for January 2015 on FolkWords. Reviewing the album for Folking.com, Dai Jeffries described Daria Kulesh's debut as very different from another Kara album – "ten original songs that are largely autobiographical... Daria writes strong melodies to go with her crystal clear voice and I wonder how much the music of her Russian childhood influences them. The result, however, is an album that rewards repeated listening." Pete Bradley, reviewing Eternal Child for FATEA Records, described it as "a phenomenal debut album". Tim Carroll, for FolkWords, said it was "possibly the most raw and unashamedly revealing collection of songs I’ve heard in a long while...Daria uses these songs to explore acute moments in her life-documentary from the unique perspective of guileless innocence born into all children". "Letting Go", a single from the album, was released in May 2014. It is described as "a bittersweet, haunting track" about her Canadian ex-sweetheart.

=== Long Lost Home ===
On 23 February 2017, Daria Kulesh launched a second album, Long Lost Home, which has won multiple awards, including LCM Album of the Year. fRoots described is as "Bold, exotic, impressive... literate original songs powerfully sung". Long Lost Home was played on national radio and reviews called it a "triumph", a "masterpiece" and "a definite contender for the best album of 2017". Mike Harding praised "The Moon and the Pilot" as "one of the most beautiful new songs of the last ten years". The album's title refers to Ingushetia in the Caucasus, which was the ancestral home of Daria's grandmother.

=== Motherland ===
Her album Motherland was released on 31 January 2025.

== Discography ==
=== Kara ===
Album	Label	Release date
Waters So Deep	own label	13 July 2014
Some Other Shore	own label	3 June 2016

=== Daria Kulesh ===
Album	Label	Release date
Eternal Child	Folkstock Records	31 January 2015
Long Lost Home	own label	23 February 2017
Motherland	own label	31 January 2025

Single	Label	Release date
"Letting Go"	Folkstock Records	May 2014
