= Kulesha =

Kulesha is a surname of Ukrainian origin derived from the local name of a traditional dish.

Notable people with the surname include:

- Artyom Kulesha (born 1990), Russian footballer
- Gary Kulesha (born 1954), Canadian musician
- Iryna Kulesha (born 1986), Belarusian weightlifter

== See also ==
- Kulesza or Kuleša, Polish and Lithuanian spellings
- Kulish
