= Jolanta Sikorska-Kulesza =

Polish academic

- Born: 1957 (age 68–69)

Academic background
- Education: University of Warsaw
- Thesis: (1990)

Academic work
- Discipline: History
- Sub-discipline: Social history
- Institutions: University of Warsaw
- Main interests: Partitioned Poland and photography
- Website: ORCID 0000-0003-1102-8802

Jolanta Sikorska-Kulesza (born 1957) is professor (since 2011) at the University of Warsaw, Department of History, member of the Research Team for the Social History of Poland in the 19th and 20th Centuries.

Sikorska-Kulesza is an alumna of the University of Warsaw (Master's degree: 1980, Ph.D.:1990, habilitation: 2005).

== Books ==
- Sikorska-Kulesza, Jolanta, ed. (2020). Album policmajstra warszawskiego. Pamiątka buntu od 1860 do 1865 (in Polish). j: Państwowy Instytut Wydawniczy. ISBN 9788306035650.
- Sikorska-Kulesza, Jolanta (2004). Zło tolerowane. Prostytucja w Królestwie Polskim w XIX wieku (in Polish). MADA. ISBN 9788389624130. transl. into English as:
  - Sikorska-Kulesza, Jolanta (2020). Zajas, Krzysztof; Fazan, Jarosław (eds.). Tolerated Evil: Prostitution in the Kingdom of Poland in the Nineteenth Century. Polish Studies Transdisciplinary Perspectives. Vol. 30. Translated by Mastalerz, Julita. Peter Lang. ISBN 9783631815847.
- Lulewicz, Henryk; Rachuba, Andrzej; Sikorska-Kulesza, Jolanta; Dumin, Stanisław; Haratym, Andrzej; Macuk, Andrej; Pospiszil, Agnieszka (2013). Rachuba, Andrzej (ed.). Dzieje rodziny Ciechanowieckich herbu Dąbrowa (XIV - XXI wiek) (in Polish). Warsaw: Wydawnictwo DiG. ISBN 9788371817854.
- Sikorska-Kulesza, Jolanta (2011). W kalejdoskopie dziejów 3 Historia Podręcznik Wiek XIX (in Polish). Juka. ISBN 978-8372538277.
- Sikorska-Kulesza, Jolanta; Ciara, Stefan (2010). W kalejdoskopie dziejow 2 Historia Podrecznik Czasy nowozytne (in Polish). Juka. ISBN 978-8372537829.
- Sikorska-Kulesza, Jolanta (1995). Deklasacja drobnej szlachty na Litwie i Białorusi w XIX wieku (in Polish). Oficyna Wydawnicza "Ajaks". ISBN 9788385621379.

== Awards and decorations ==
- 2011: Departmental decoration Medal of the Commission of National Education
- 2005: Clio Award of 2nd degree, University of Warsaw
