= Ignacy Julian Cejzyk =

Polish artist

Ignacy Julian Cejzyk (IPA: [iɡˈna.t͡sɘ ˈjuː.ljan ˈt͡sɛjzɨk]; 1779–1858) was a Polish artist and forger. He was the grandson of a Lithuanian military officer and was born in 1779 in the Polish-Lithuanian Commonwealth (the Podlaskie Voivodeship, which later belonged to the Grodno Governorate), in the city of Lyskovo, in the present day Belarus.
