= Kuleshov =

Kuleshov (Russian: Кулешо́в) and Kuleshova (Russian: Кулешова; feminine) is a common Russian surname that traces its origins to Russia, Belarus and Ukraine

People with this surname include:

- Aleksey Kuleshov (b. 1979), Russian volleyball player
- Alla Kuleshova (b. 1945), Russian rower
- Arkadi Kuleshov (1914–1978), Belarusian poet and translator
- Dmitry Kuleshov (born 1978), Russian serial killer
- Lev Kuleshov (1899–1970), Soviet filmmaker and film theorist, who demonstrated the Kuleshov effect
- Mikhail Kuleshov (b. 1981), Russian ice hockey player
- Oleg Kuleshov (b. 1974), Russian handball player
- Vladimir Kuleshov (b. 1986), Russian footballer
- Yuri Kuleshov (b. 1981), Russian footballer

== See also ==
- Irina Kuleshova-Kovrova
