= Kulis (surname) =

Kulis or Kuliš is a surname. Notable people include:

- Jekabs Kulis, Latvian police sergeant
- Duško Kuliš (born 1960), Bosnian folk singer and songwriter
- Lidija Kuliš (born 1992), Bosnian footballer
- Monika Kuliš (born 1995), Bosnian footballer

== See also ==
- Kulish, alternative spelling of Kuliš
