= Vasiliy Griaznov =

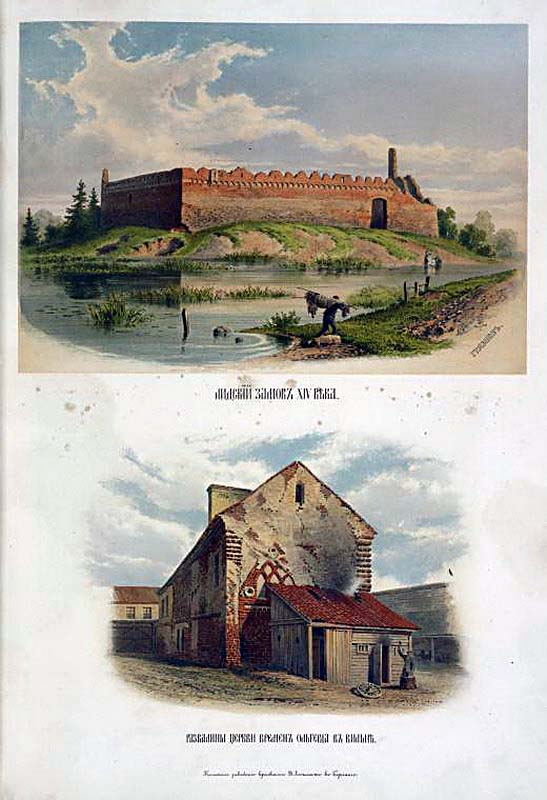
Top: Lida Castle Bottom: Ruins of a church dating from the times of Algirdas; in Vilnius

Vasiliy Vasilievich Griaznov (Belarusian:Васіль Васільевіч Гразноў; c.1840, place unknown — 27 February 1909, Vilnius) was a Belarusian painter, art teacher and architectural historian.

== Life and work ==
He graduated from the Stroganov Moscow State Academy of Arts and Industry with a diploma in technical drawing and landscape painting, then served as a draftsman in the silver workshop of the Sazikov jewelry company. In 1864, at the invitation of Ivan Petrovich Kornilov, a trustee of the Vilnius School District, he moved to Vilnius, where he devoted himself to the study of historical monuments. He also taught drawing and calligraphy in the public schools. After 1886, he taught at a girls' school.

He made numerous trips throughout Lithuania and Belarus, seeking out monuments and landmarks, then taking photographs or painting watercolors. Some of his photographs were published in the Vilnius city calendar for 1887; although it had to be produced outside of Lithuania, due to a lack of the necessary technical equipment. His graphics were often exhibited in St. Petersburg at archaeological congresses. As these works were designed for practical use, relatively few have survived. A notable example depicts the Church of St. Michael, Synkavichy. Some were used as book illustrations.

In the late 1860s, he was one of the first to investigate and describe the Kalozha Church, following its partial collapse. He found traces of forgotten frescoes, including a depiction of the Holy Trinity, and determined that the church once had a wooden bell tower.

Perhaps his best known discovery came about when he was searching through a church in Turov and came across a box of coal mixed with paper. When he spread out the contents, he found a manuscript from the 11th century which is now known as the Turov Gospel.

== Gallery ==
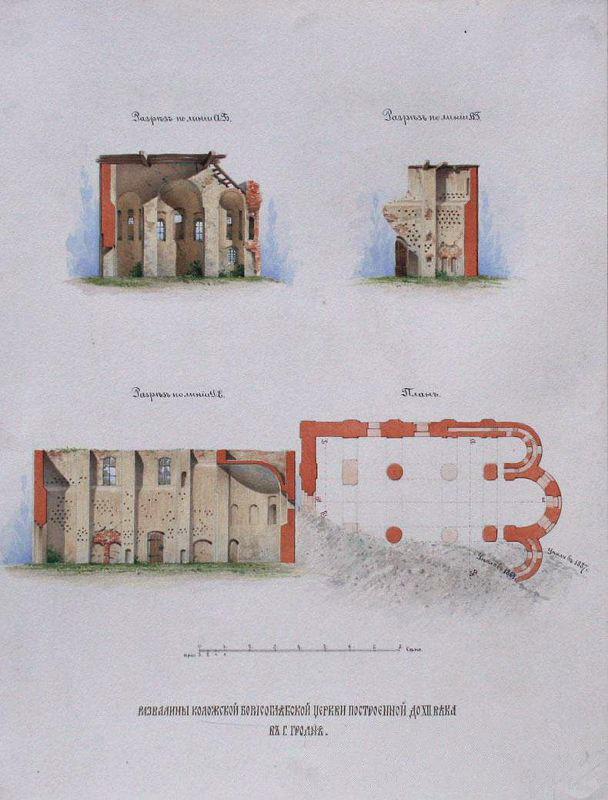
Kalozha Church

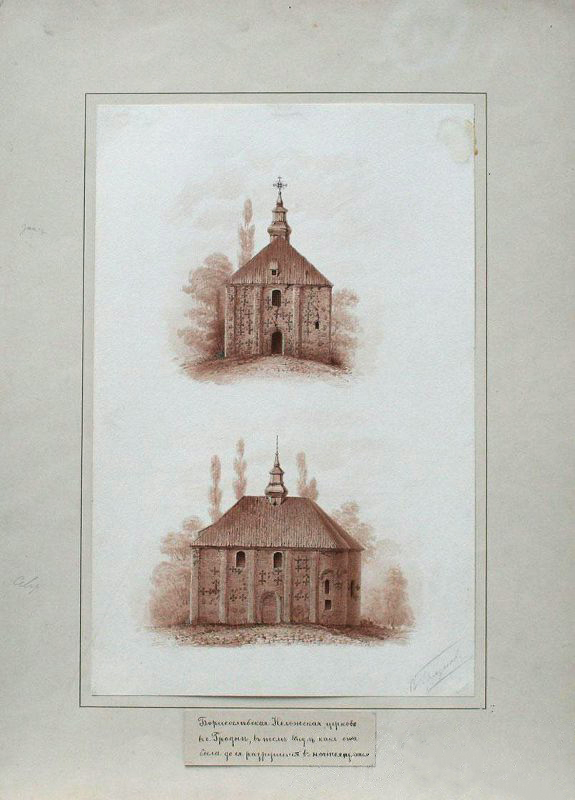
Kalozha Church

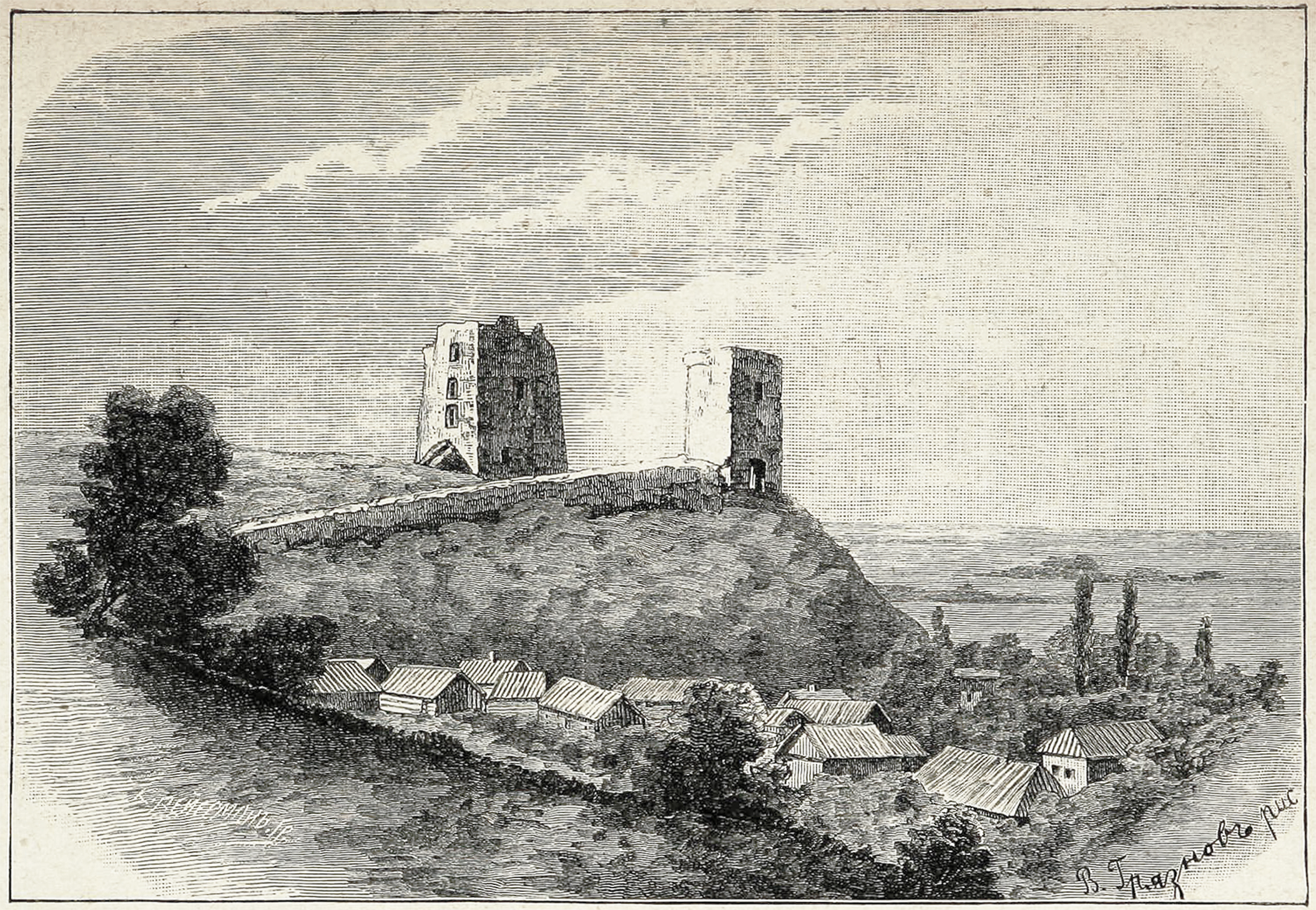
Navahrudak Castle

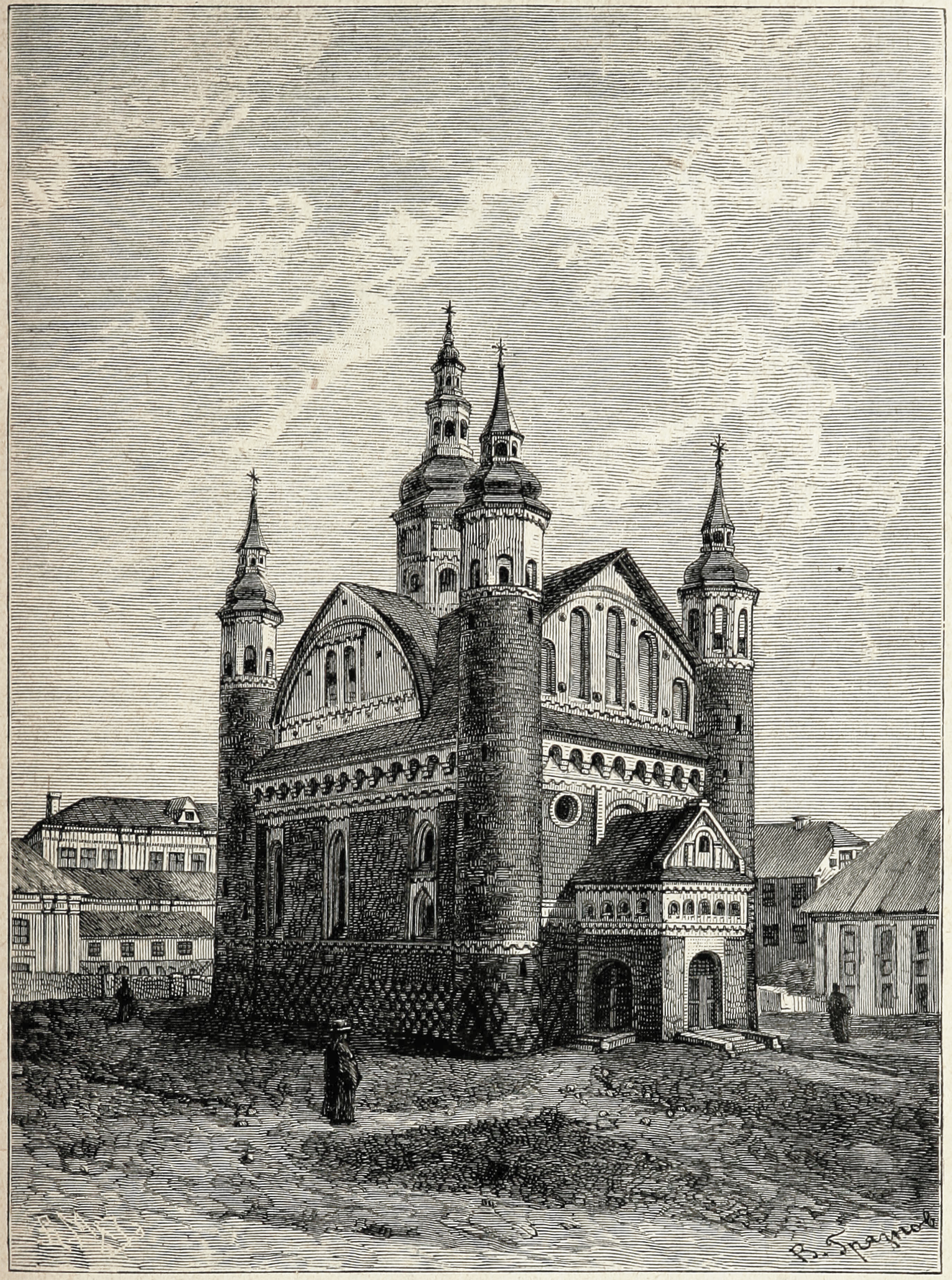
Supraśl Orthodox Monastery

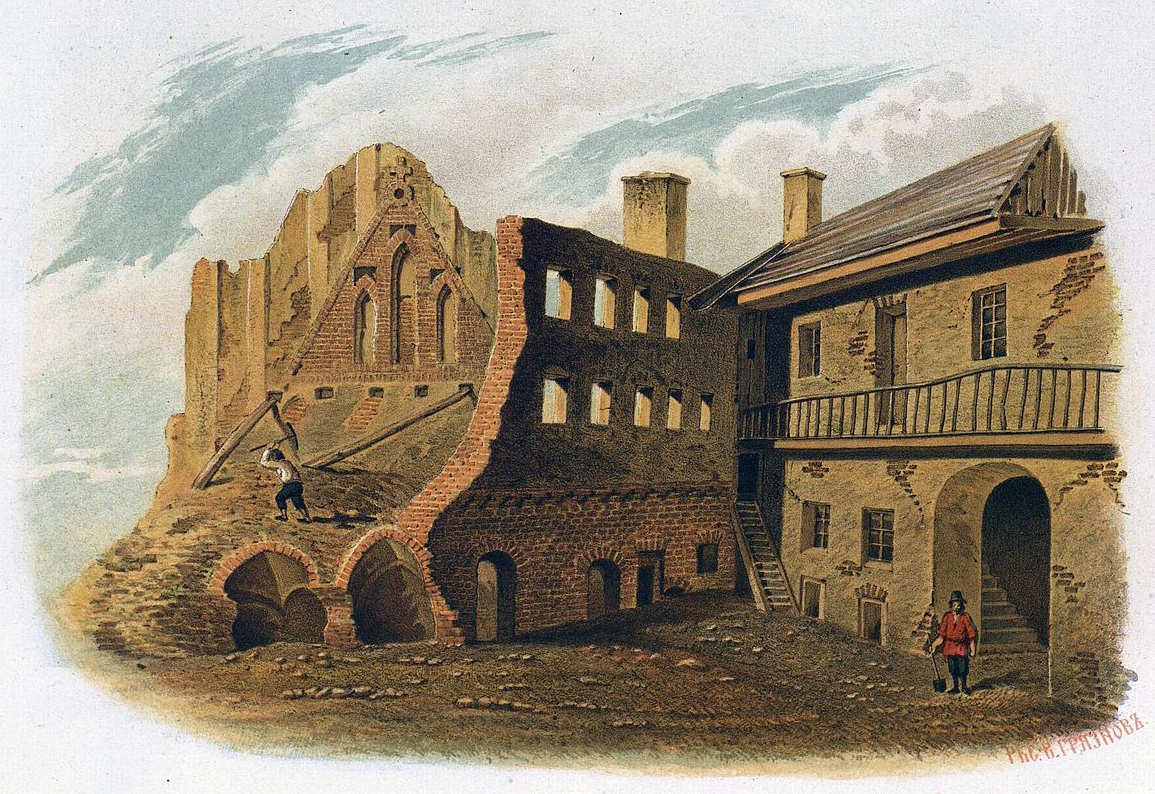
Vilnia, Spaskaja

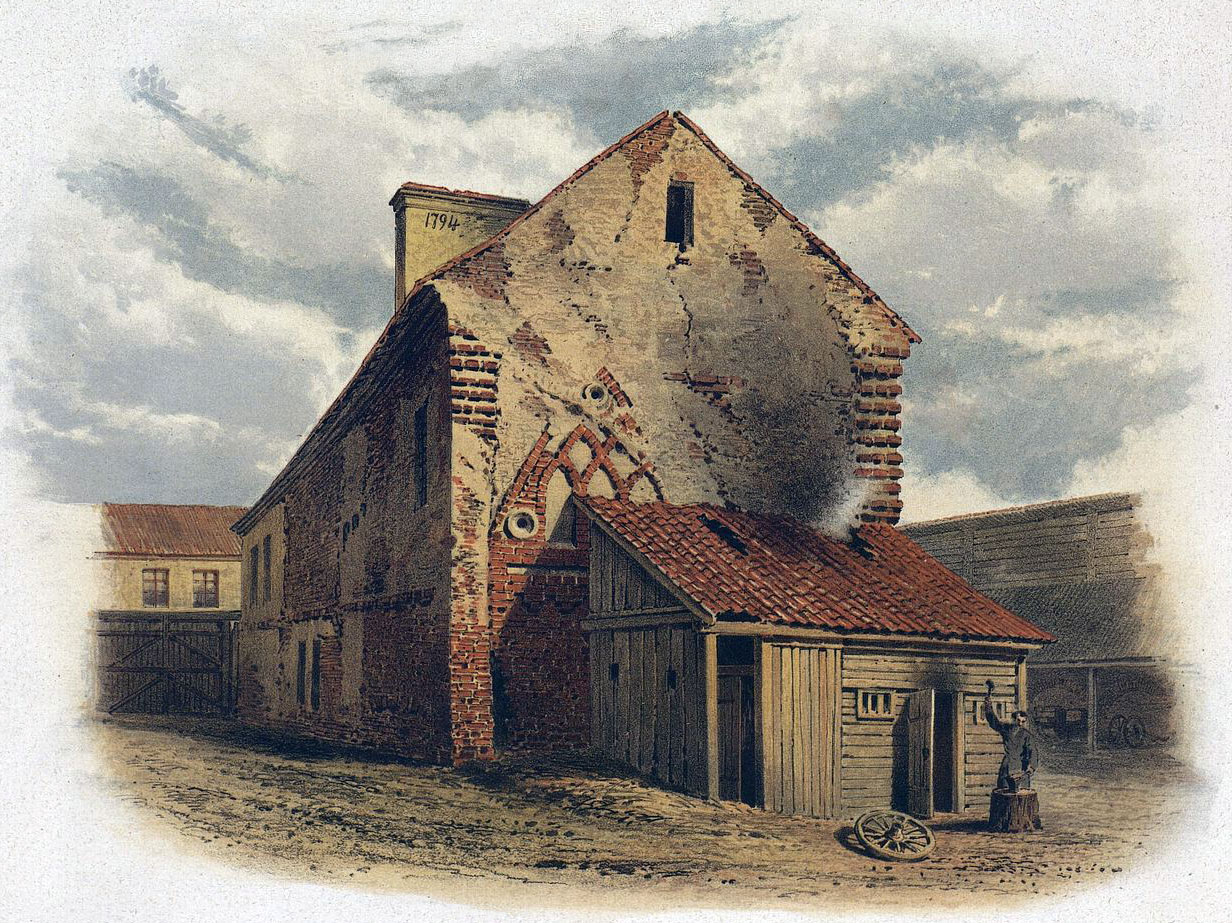
Vilnia, Spaskaja

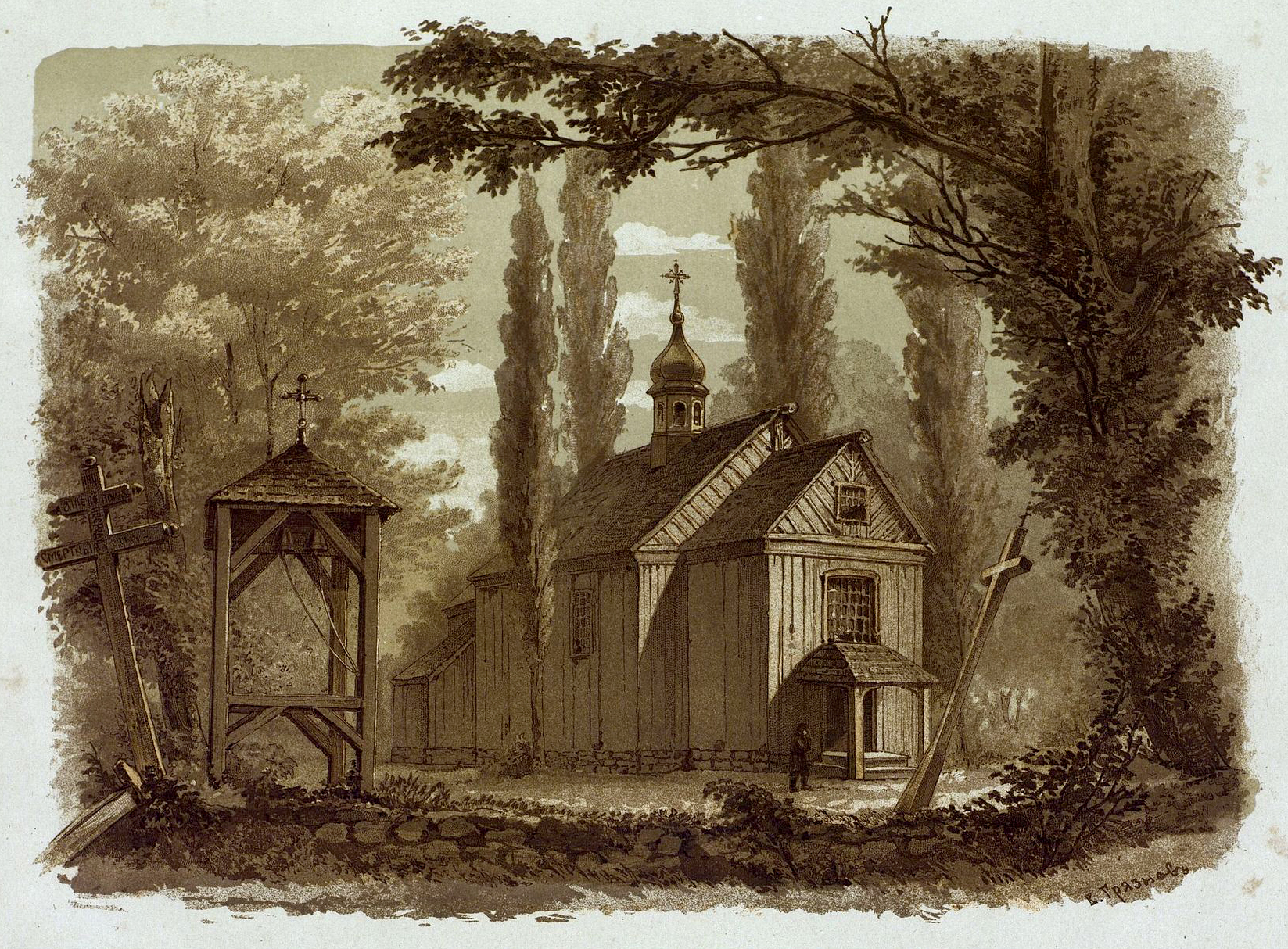
Vitulin, Michajłaŭskaja
