= Franciszek Smuglewicz =

Polish-Lithuanian draughtsman and painter

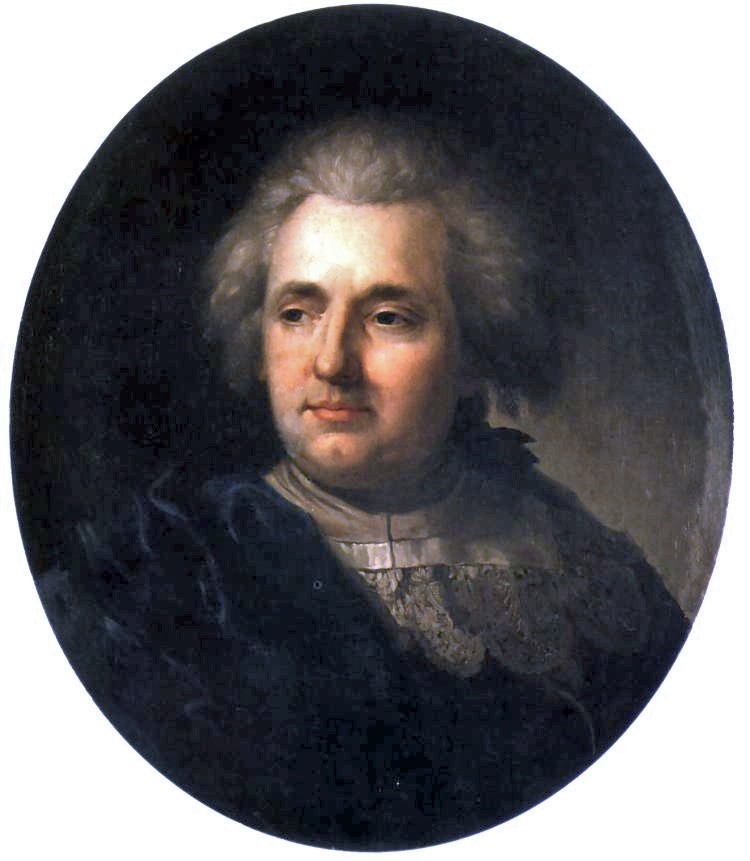
Franciszek Smuglewicz by Józef Peszka, his student.

Franciszek Smuglewicz (Lithuanian: Pranciškus Smuglevičius; 6 October 1745 – 18 September 1807) was a Polish-Lithuanian draughtsman and painter. Smuglewicz is considered a progenitor of Lithuanian art in the modern era. He was precursor of historicism in Polish painting. He was also a founder of Vilnius school of art, his most prominent students were Jan Rustem, Jan Krzysztof Damel, Gaspar Borowski and Józef Oleszkiewicz. His father Łukasz Smuglewicz and brother Antoni were also painters.

== Biography ==
Franciszek Smuglewicz was born in Warsaw as son of Łukasz Smuglewicz, who was also a painter, and Regina Olesińska. His mother, Regina Olesińska, was the niece of painter Szymon Czechowicz. He made his first steps as a painter in his father and Czechowicz joint workshop in Warsaw. In 1763 Franciszek journeyed to Rome, where he began the study of fine arts under the tutorship of Anton von Maron. He stayed in Rome for 21 years, where he embraced the Neo-Classical style.

In 1765 he received a royal scholarship from the King of Poland Stanisław August Poniatowski and was admitted into the Saint Lucas Academy. As a colleague of Vincenzo Brenna he participated in cataloging artifacts from Nero's Domus Aurea. In 1784 he returned to Warsaw, where he founded his own school of fine arts, one of the predecessors of the modern Academy of Fine Arts.

A classicist, but under strong influence of the Polish baroque, Smuglewicz became a notable representative of historical paintings, a genre that dominated the fine arts of Poland throughout the 19th century. Around 1790 he started working on a series of sketches and lithographies inspired by Adam Naruszewicz's History of the Polish Nation. Although never finished, this series gained him much popularity.

In 1797 he moved to Vilnius, where he became the founder and the first deacon of the Institute of Sketch and Painting at the Academy of Vilnius.

In 1801 he painted allegorical ceiling paintings for Tsar Paul I at his new imperial palace, the Mikhailovsky Castle, in St Petersburg, which was also designed by Brenna.

A tutor of generations of Polish-Lithuanian painters, Smuglewicz devoted himself to historical paintings in the latter years of his life. He brought to Lithuania classical ideas and views of enlightened classicism. He painted everyday life, and the architecture of Vilnius in a realistic manner. His works helped with the ongoing reconstruction of the Royal Palace of Lithuania in Vilnius.

Among the notable surviving works of that period are A Meeting of the Four Years' Sejm (1793) and Kościuszko's Oath at Kraków's Old Town Market (1797), Lithuanian Peasants, Freeing Peasants from Serfdom in Merkinė. Among his works of the period are views of the city walls and city gates that were demolished during the 19th century.

He was buried in Vilnius at Rasos Cemetery (Polish: Cmentarz na Rossie), although the exact location is not known.

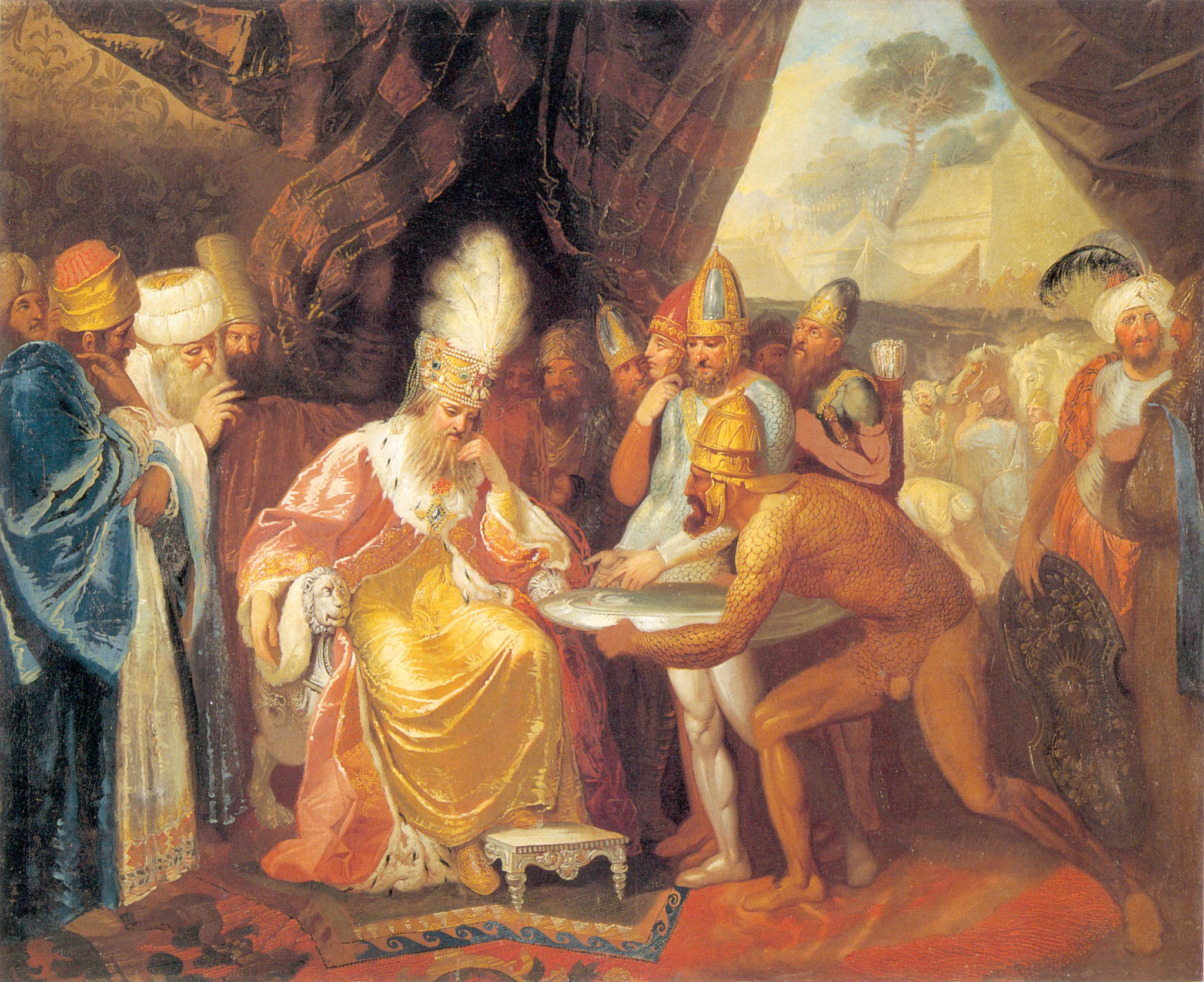
Scythians meeting with Darius, 1785

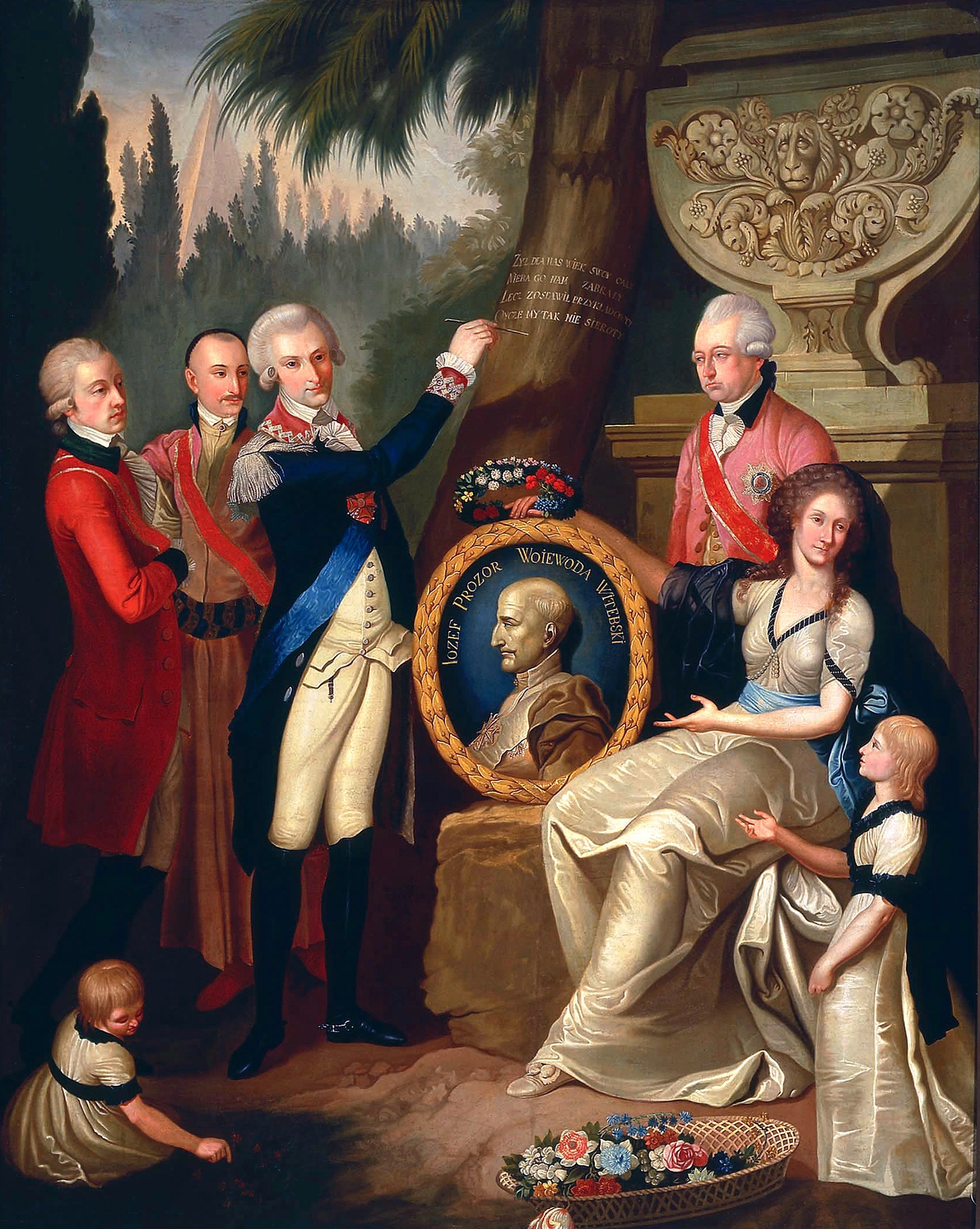
Portrait of the Prozor Family, 1789, National Museum in Warsaw

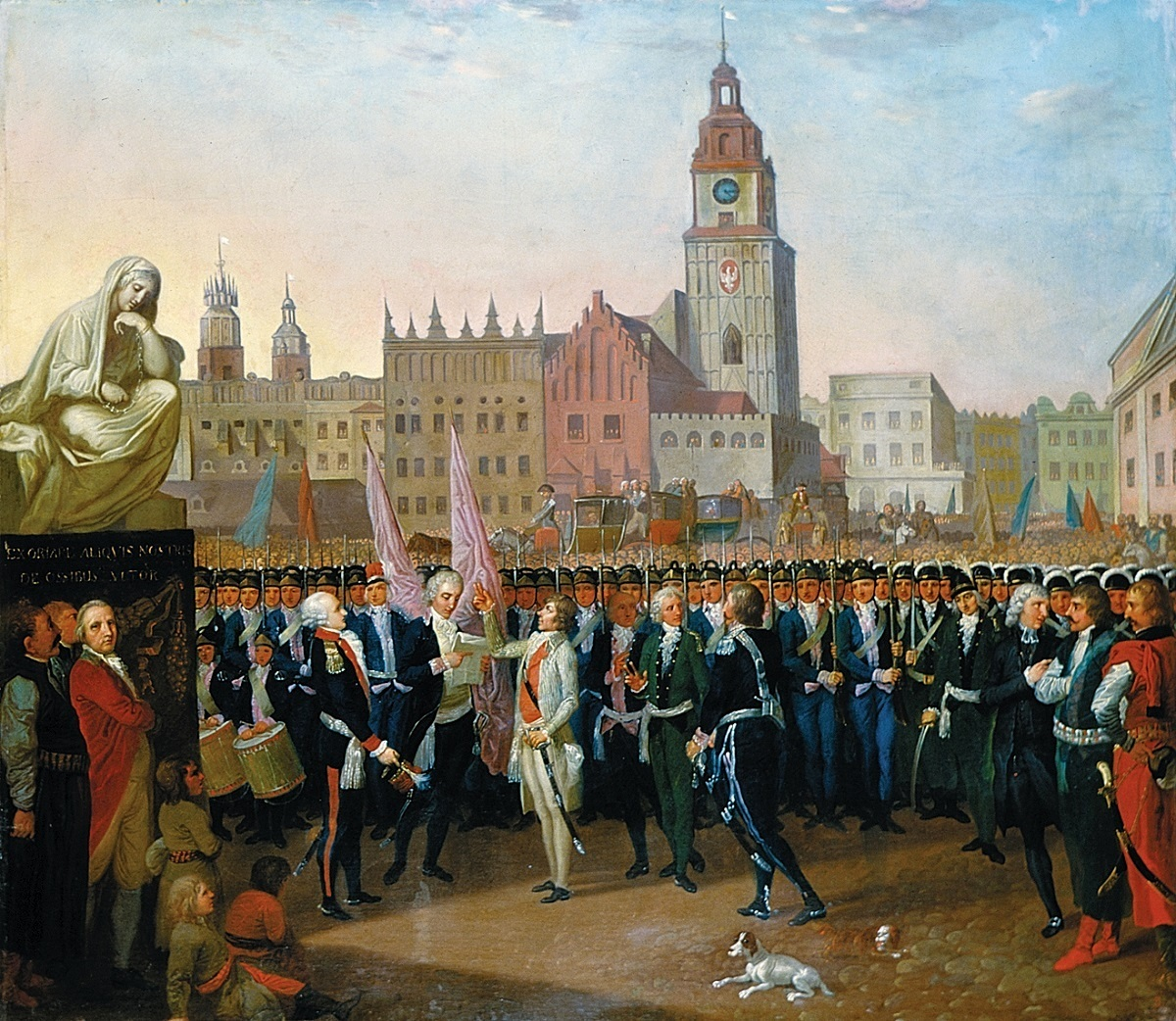
"Tadeusz Kościuszko taking the oath", 1797

== Bibliography ==
Ryszkiewicz, Andrzej (1999–2000). "Franciszek Smuglewicz". Polski Słownik Biograficzny (in Polish). Vol. 39. Warszawa-Kraków: Polska Akademia Nauk. pp. 374–378. Archived from the original on 28 October 2020.
