= Kalisz (surname) =

Kalisz is a surname. Notable people with the surname include:

- Armand Kaliz (born Kalisz, 1882–1941), American actor
- Chase Kalisz (born 1994), American swimmer
- Jacques Kalisz (1926–2002), Polish-born French architect
- John Kalisz, American comics artist
- Raymond Kalisz (1927–2010), American-born Papua New Guinean Roman Catholic bishop
- Ryszard Kalisz (born 1957), Polish politician
