= Pitchers (ceramic material) =

Pottery broken in the course of manufacture

Pitchers are pottery that has been broken in the course of manufacture. Biscuit (unglazed) pitchers can be crushed, ground and re-used, either as a low-percentage addition to the virgin raw materials on the same factory, or elsewhere as grog. Because of the adhering glaze, glost pitchers find less use. The crushed material can also be used in other industries as an inert filler.

Archaeologists call ancient pitchers sherds or ostracons; shards or ostraca.
