= Michał Kulesza =

Polish-Lithuanian painter (1799–1863)

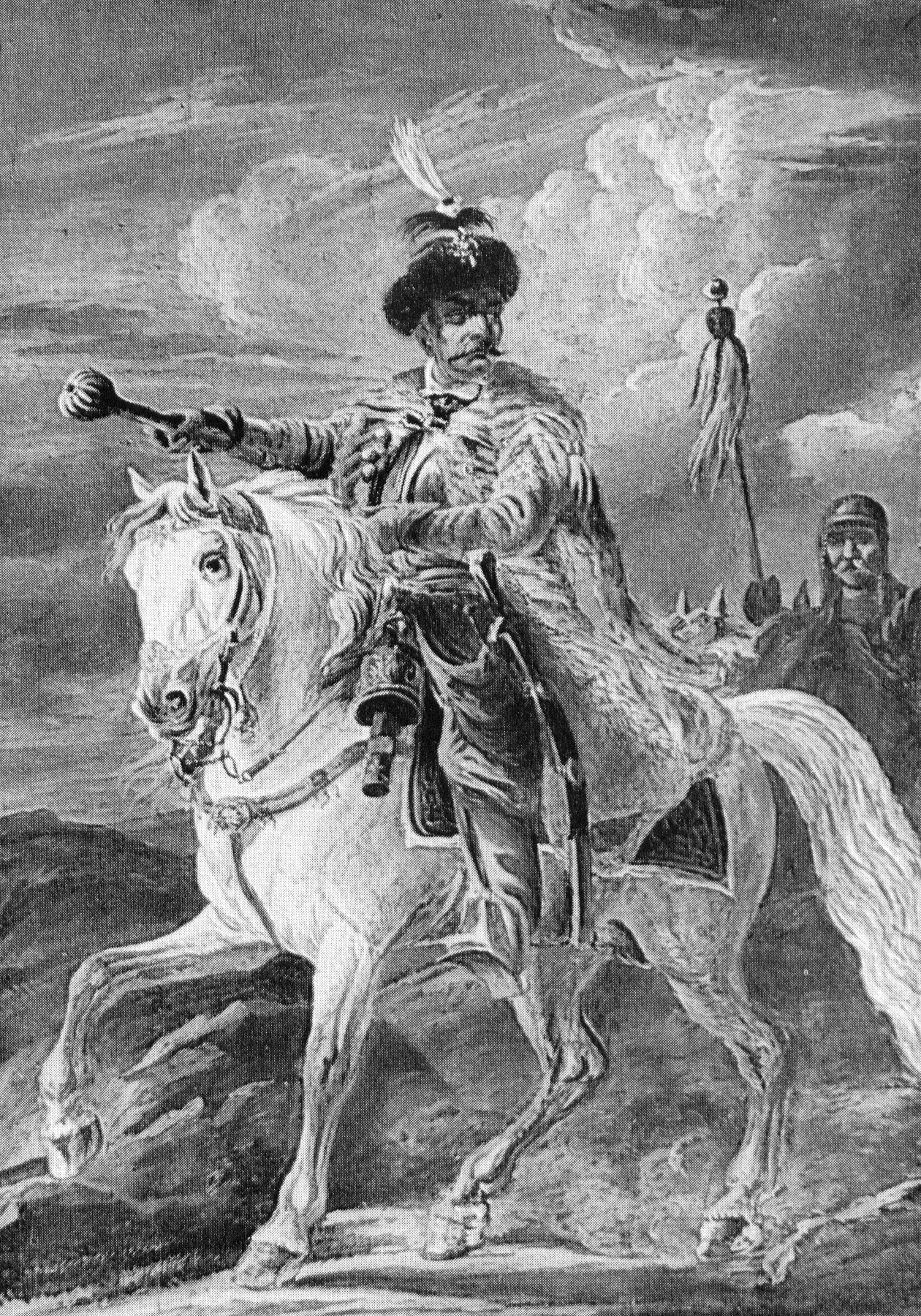
- The picture of the Belarusian artist Mikhail Kulesha, depicting military leader
- Born: Michał Aleksander Piotr Kulesza; 26 November 1799; Vilnius, Russian Empire
- Died: 6 November 1863 (aged 63); Białystok, Russian Empire
- Education: PhD (Imperial University of Vilnius)
- Known for: Oil painting, lithography
- Notable work: "Hussars Poised to Strike," "Barbara Radziwiłł," "Sts. Boris and Gleb's Church in Kalozha, Hrodna"
- Movement: Romanticism
- Patrons: Jan Kazimierz Wilczyński

Michał Kulesza (Lithuanian: Mykolas Kuleša; 26 November 1799 – 6 November 1863) was a Romantic painter. He was among the first lithographers in the area of the former Grand Duchy of Lithuania, ruled by Russia for almost all of his life. His frequent theme, sites linked to the Grand Duchy's history, reflected the growing Lithuanian and Polish ethnic activism in the area. He lived and worked in today's southern Lithuania, south-eastern Belarus, and north-eastern Poland, and travelled around in search of new subjects for his oil paintings and lithographs. A leading landscape painter of his period, Kulesza created images that are now among the sparse visual records of the region in the first half of the 19th century.

== Biography ==
Michał Kulesza was born in Vilnius, then the capital of Russia's Vilna Governorate. Two encyclopedic sources give the year of his birth as 1799, a few authors list 1800 without the month or day. He lived and worked in a multi-ethnic area, although he called himself a "Polish painter" when he published his work in France, he referred to the Polish–Lithuanian Commonwealth and from his last name Kulesza, it can not be judged on his ethnicity, as it may be both Polish, as well as old Lithuanian spelling. It is not known how many languages, and how often, he spoke. He attended the notable Cistercian grade school in Troškūnai, his artistic training started in preparatory middle-and-high school (gymnasium) back in his birthplace when he took classes with the neoclassicist painter Jonas Damelis. He then continued at the Imperial University of Vilnius, where Jan Rustem began to teach lithography in 1819, from which he received a PhD in art in 1829.

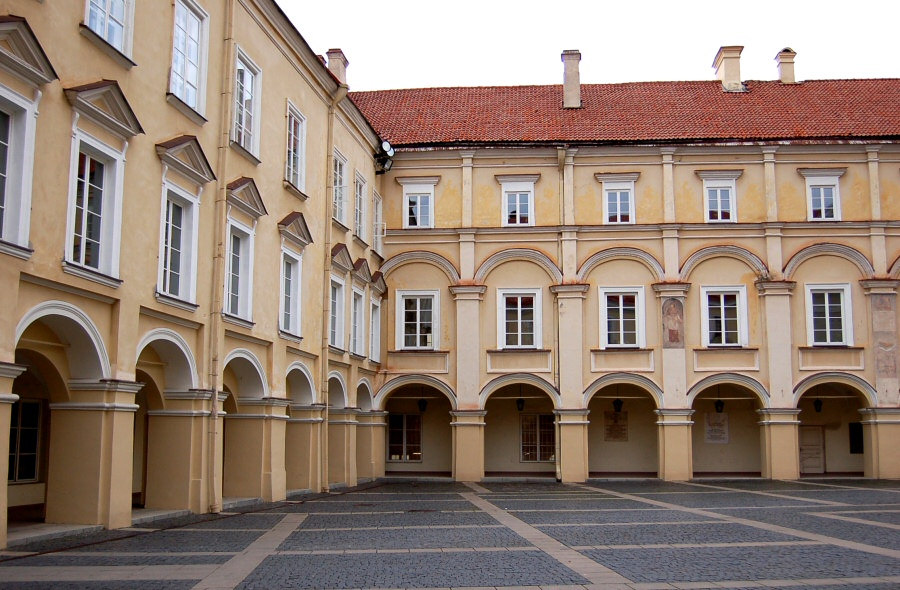
Parts of the university are little changed from Kulesza's times.

He joined the anti-Russian organization Philomaths while in college and was arrested in that connection in 1823, like his younger fellow student and future writer Józef Ignacy Kraszewski, who later helped publicize Kulesza's paintings, but unlike his other subsequently famous fellow student and co-conspirator Adam Mickiewicz, who was deported to Siberia. Once on the job market, Kulesza spent about a decade as a freelance artist and private tutor in painting, and worked for the lithographic shop opened by Józef Oziębłowski in Vilnius in 1835, which became a hub for several talented artists. He travelled in the Crimea and, according to one source, stayed at a residence for artists in Minsk for a time in the 1830s.

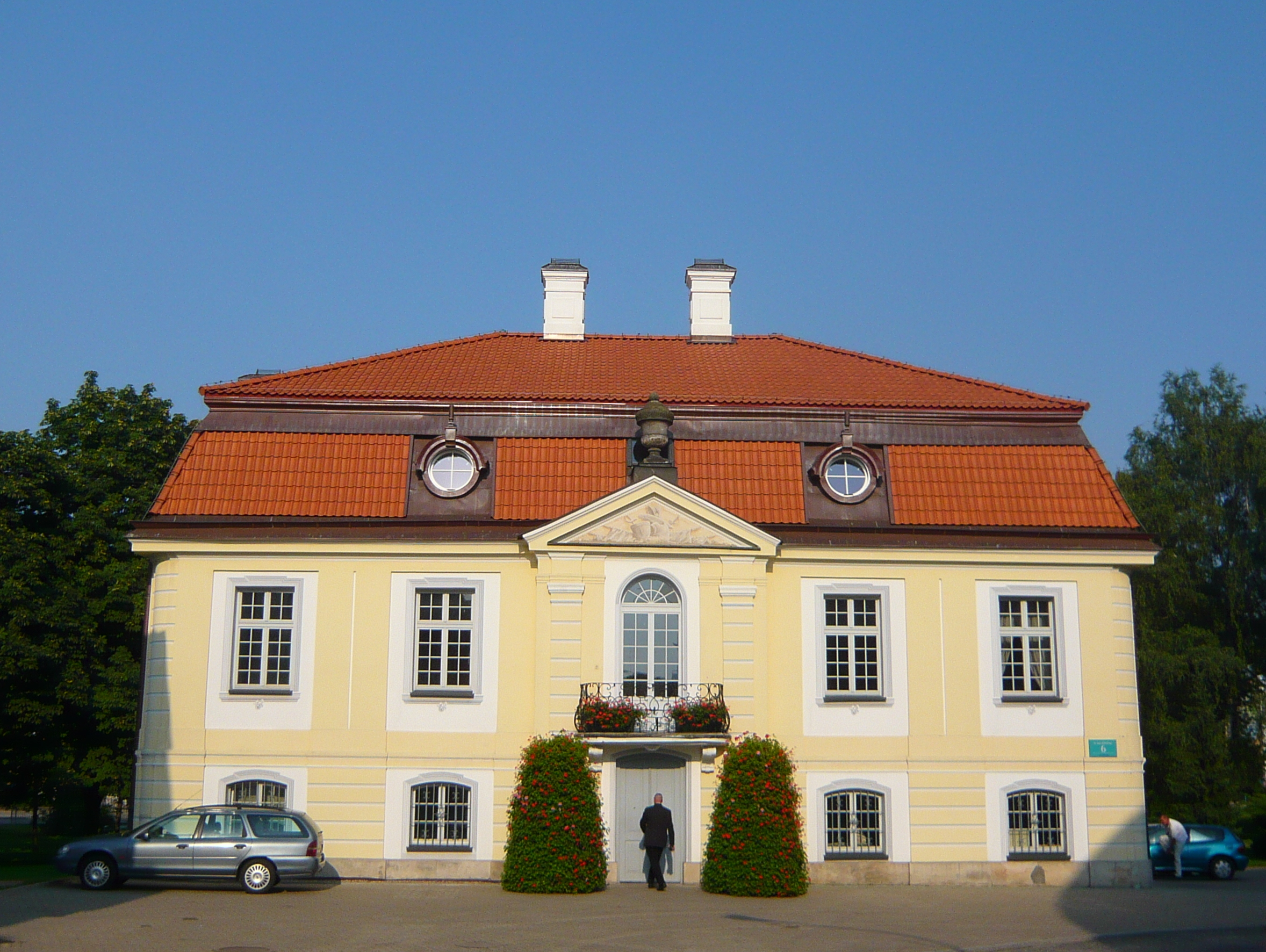
Tsar's palace turned to noble girls' school

He left Vilnius to take a teaching position at Kražiai Gymnasium in 1837. While plans were being drawn up to close the venerable school, he was transferred to teach painting at a high school in Hrodna two years later. In 1844 he took a position at the Institute for Noble Maidens recently opened in Białystok where he remained for the rest of his life.

== Paintings and lithographs ==
Kulesza's main techniques were oil painting (some tempera), watercolor, and drawing. Among the urban and rural landscapes, including the images of the Neman flowing toward the horizon that critics extolled, a frequent theme in Kulesza's Romantic paintings were sites linked to the history of the Grand Duchy of Lithuania, which reflected the growing Lithuanian and Polish ethnic activism in the area. Several of his other paintings depict the interiors of churches, he made portraits, and also painted stage sets for Count Pusłowski's private theater at his palace in Kosava. His paintings were often made into lithographs for sale or publication. They decorated noble and middle-class homes in his lifetime, some have since found their way to museums around the region.

Lithuania's past captivated Kulesza.

Along with Wincenty Dmochowski (Vincentas Dmachauskas), Kulesza was a leading landscape painter of his place and time. The part of Europe where he lived and worked is now split among three independent countries, he is currently described as a Lithuanian, Polish, or Belarusian artist in sync with the place of publication of the text making the statement. His paintings have been given the most coverage and their themes treated as nationally relevant in Lithuania (where his name is rendered as Mykolas Kuleša) in modern times, their regional and documentary pertinence has mostly been addressed in Poland and Belarus. In all of those countries, his art is now part of their shared heritage of the Grand Duchy of Lithuania.

Kulesza would travel in the vicinity of the places where he lived and farther away in search of new subjects for his Romantic paintings, which are now among the sparse images of the region in the early 19th century. He contributed to the celebrated series of pictures of Vilnius conceived by Jan Kazimierz Wilczyński that started coming out in 1845 and published his own lithographic portfolios in Paris in 1850 and 1852.

=== "Sts. Boris and Gleb's Church in Kalozha, Hrodna" ===
The subject of the 1840s tempera, lithographed later, is one of the oldest north European Eastern Orthodox churches, built in Kalozha (formerly Kolozha) in Hrodna, now in Belarus. At the time, an art critic admired its harmony and saw the composition and color execution of the river vanishing in the foggy distance as a vehicle of deep sadness, an expression of the inertia, "dull heaviness," that permeated the provinces. The potential documentary value of the painting increased when the Neman River undercut the bank near the church in 1853, and its southern wall collapsed, but the picture pays scanty attention to architectural detail. In a modern interpretation, its focus is on the broader significance of what it depicts. The attractive darker outline of the church soaring on the steep embankment stands out against the sky, the fastidious composition of the landscape is enlivened with people in the picture's front plane, who underscore the human relevance of the pleasant location and the majestic glory of the historical temple.
