= Marian Kulesza =

Polish academic painter (1878–1943)

Marian Kulesza, Lith. Marijonas Kuleša , (1878–1943) was a Polish academic painter, born in Suwałki, worked in Vilnius.
