= Jan Rustem =

Armenian painter (1762–1835)

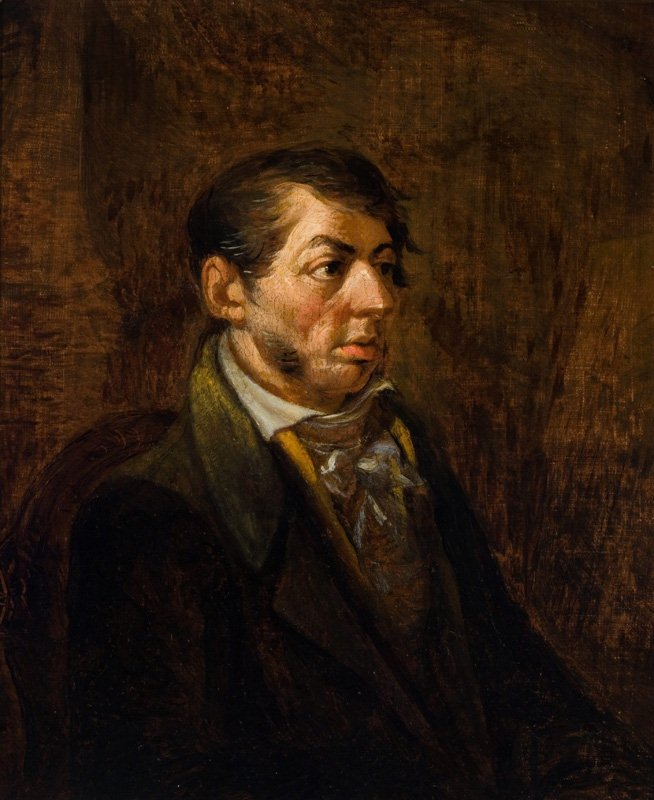
Self-portrait (date unknown)

Jan Rustem (Armenian: Յան Ռուստամ; 1762 – 21 June 1835) was a painter of Armenian ethnicity who lived and worked in the territories of the Polish–Lithuanian Commonwealth. Primarily a portrait painter, he was commissioned to execute portraits of notable personalities of his epoch. For many years he was a professor at Vilnius University.

== Biography ==
He was born in Constantinople, and as a young orphan boy was sponsored by Adam Kazimierz Czartoryski, who invited him to the Commonwealth around 1774. Czartoryski paid for his studies in Warsaw, where among his tutors were Jean-Pierre Norblin de La Gourdaine and Marcello Bacciarelli. Between 1788 and 1790, he moved to Germany, where he became a freemason. Two years later he returned to the Lithuanian-Polish Commonwealth and lived for some time in Warsaw, later moving to Vilnius.

Following the partitions of the Commonwealth, Rustem started working for Vilnius University, as an assistant to Franciszek Smuglewicz. After Smuglewicz's death, the professorship of Fine Art was awarded in 1810 to the Englishman, Joseph Saunders and Rustem became his collaborator. In 1811, he became a professor of sketching and in 1819 became a professor of painting. Rustem retired in 1826, but continued to give lectures until his death, which occurred near Dūkštas, Lithuania. Among his successful students were Taras Shevchenko, Józef Oleszkiewicz, Kanuty Rusiecki, and Michał Kulesza.

== Selected portraits ==
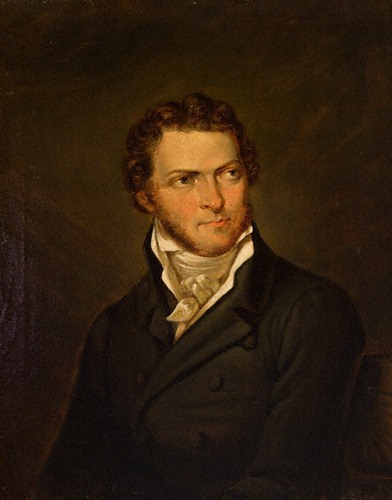
Michał Józef Römer

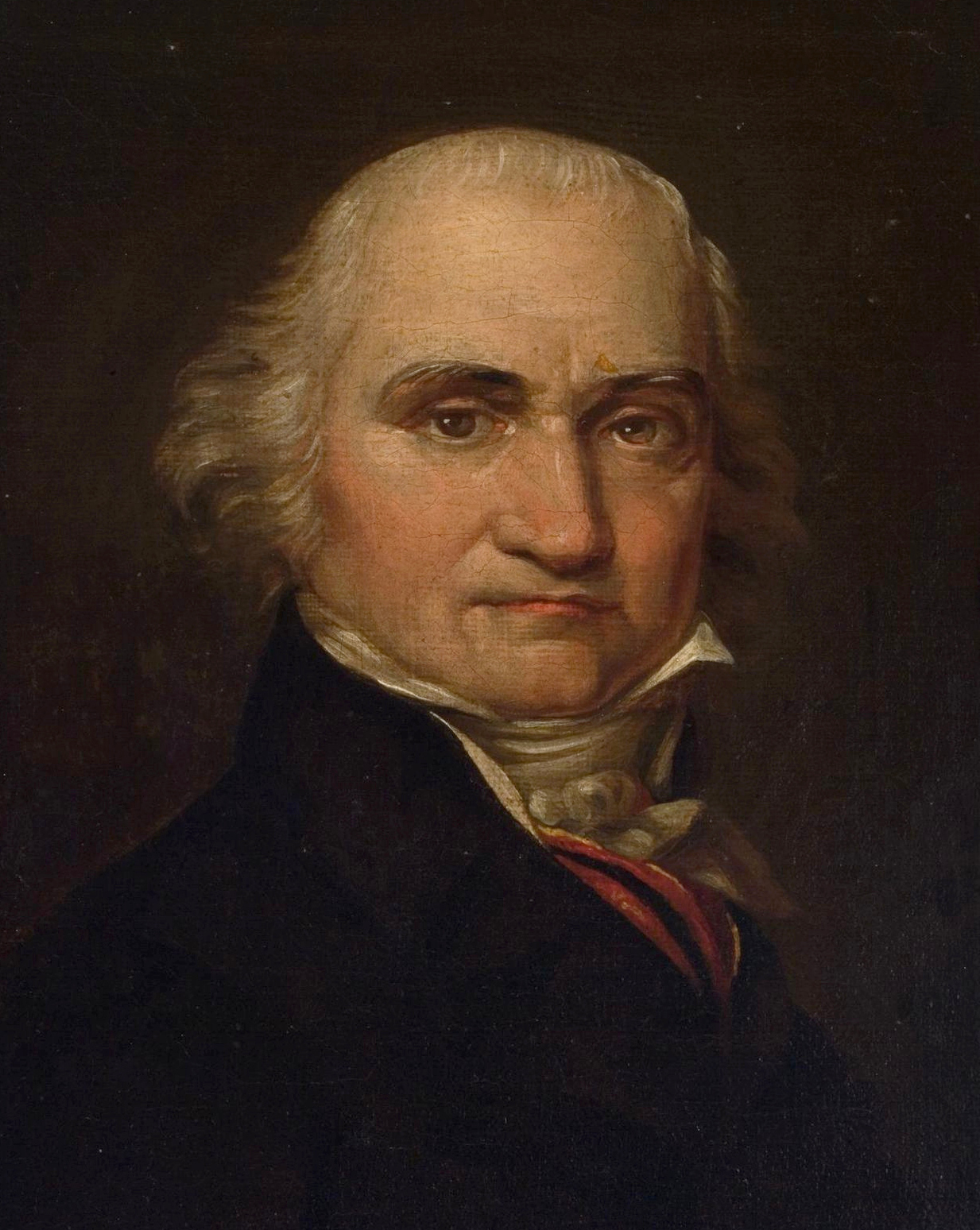
Jan Śniadecki

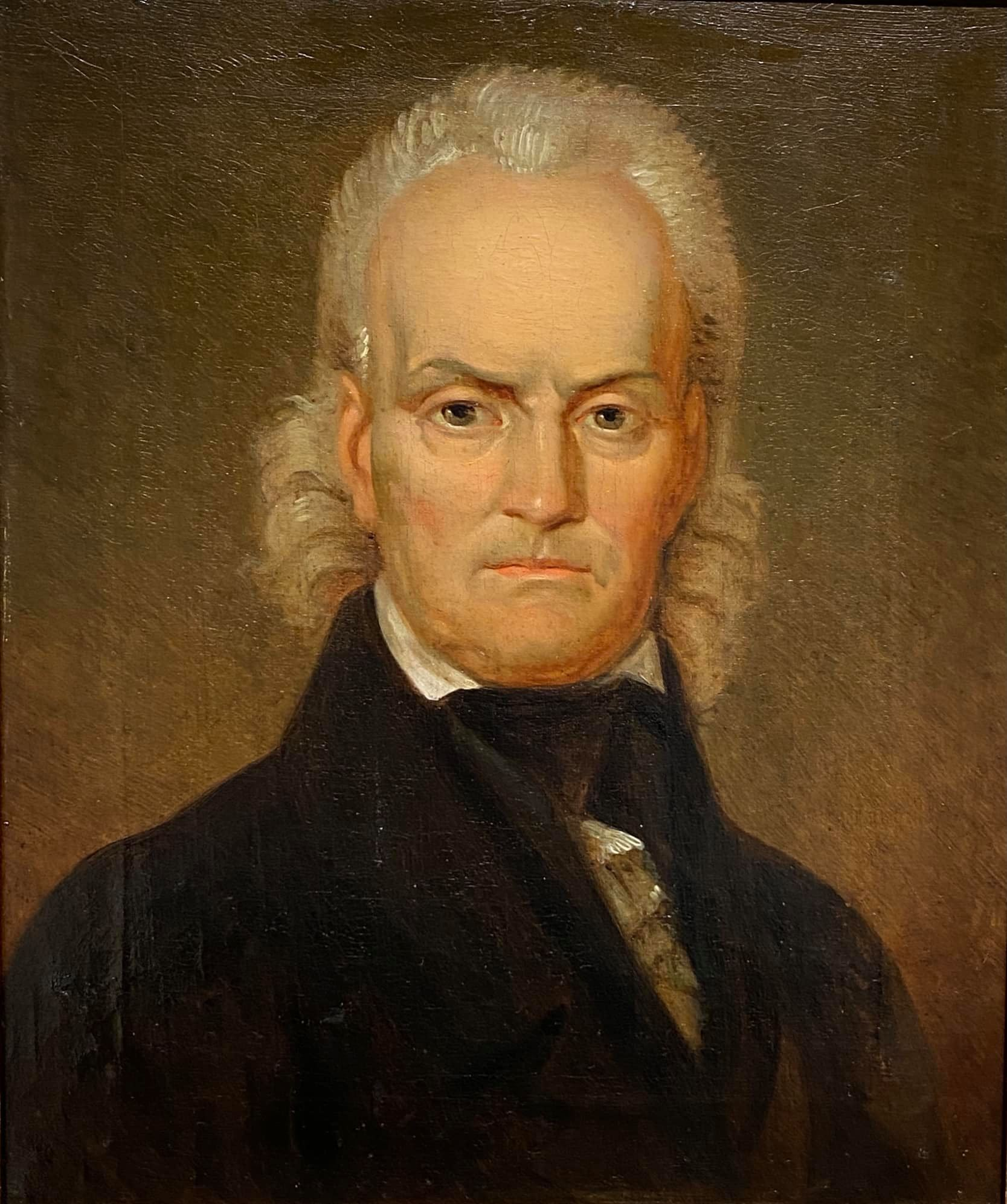
Stanisław Bonifacy Jundziłł

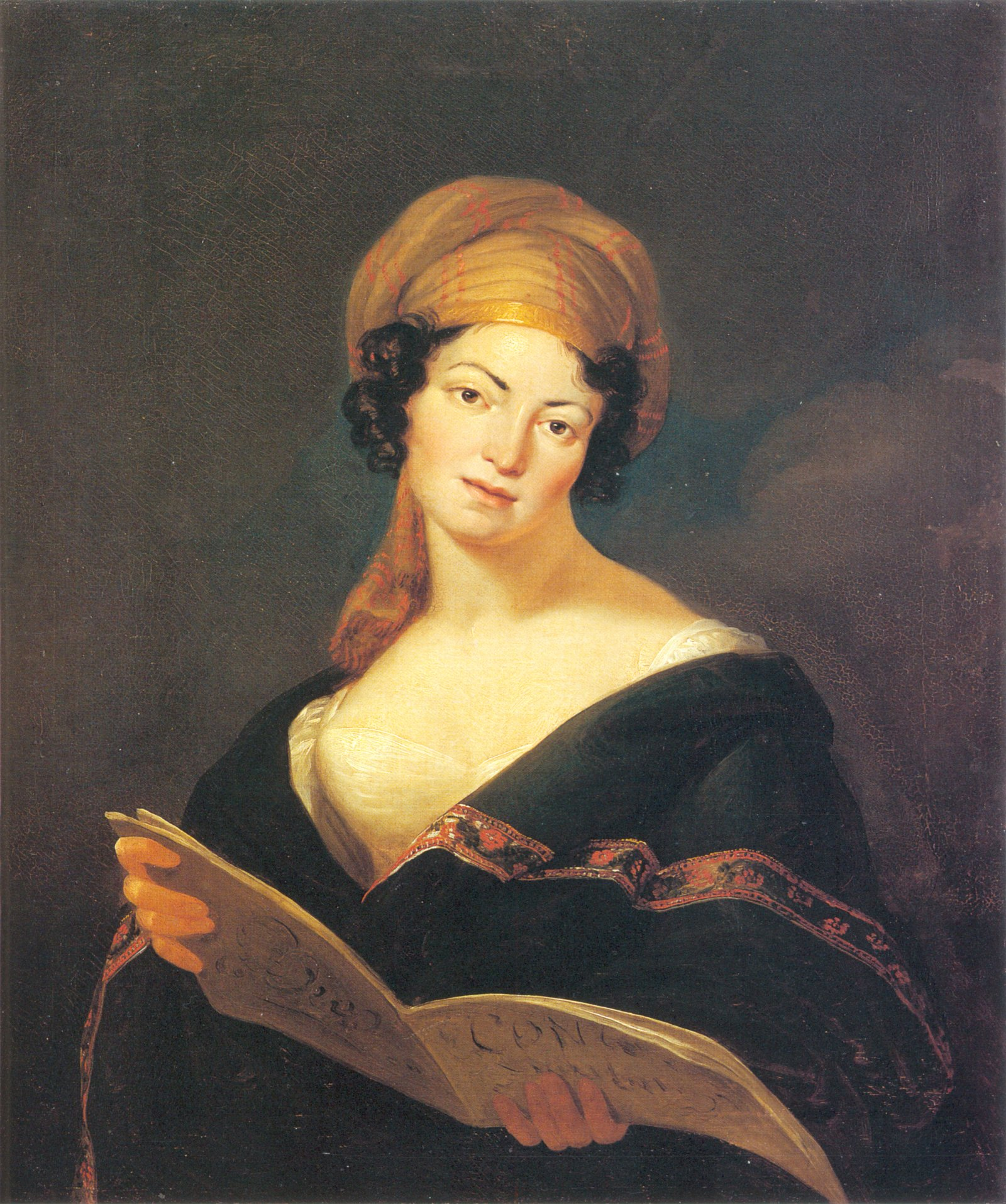
Krystyna Frank, wife of Dr. Józef Frank
