= Kalisch =

Kalisch is the German name for Kalisz.

People with the surname Kalisch:

- David Kalisch (1820–1872), German Jewish playwright and humorist
- David Kalisch (economist) (born 1960), Australian economist and statistician
- Isidor Kalisch (1816–1886), Polish-American rabbi and author
- Ludwig Kalisch (1814–1882), Polish-German Jewish novelist
- Marcus Kalisch (1828–1885), German-British Hebraist and Bible commentator
- Paul Kalisch (1855–1946), German Jewish singer
- Sven Kalisch (born 1966), German former Islamic theologian

== See also ==
- Kalish (disambiguation)
- Kalisz (disambiguation)
