= Glossary of pre-Christian Lithuanian names =

A number of Lithuanian surnames evolved from the ancient pre-Christian Lithuanian personal names, such as Budrys, Girdenis, Tylenis, Vilkas, Amantas, Bukantas, Rimgaila, Vizgirda, Tarvydas. Many of them are of compound type, typically consisting of two stems (dithematic names), and many are of single stem. Sometimes the order of these stems may reverse, e.g., Norvaišas vs. Vaišnoras, Tautvydas vs. Vytautas.

Some two-stemmed names have a clear etymology, arising from nicknames, such as Baltakis = Balt-akys = "White eyes". Alfred Senn suggests that such transparent names are less ancient development, while those with non-evident etymology originate from the Indo-European pra-language.

A two-stemmed name may be further compounded into a patronymic cognomen/surname: Algirdas—Algirdaitis (son of Algirdas; see Lithuanian names of Vladimir Olgerdovich, Andrei of Polotsk, Dmitry of Bryansk), Žygimantas—Žygimantaitis.

Much of this glossary of stems common in ancient Lithuanian names is based on Dictionary of Lithuanian Surnames, searchable online in the Lithuanian Surname Database (LSD).

== A ==
- Al-, Alg-; several suggested etymologies
  Algimantas, Algirdas, Almantas, Alminas, Alvydas
- Ar-
  Arminas, Arvydas
- Aš-
  Ašmantas, Ašvydas

== B ==
- bu, but (may be first or second stem), associated with the verb "to be" (search for "Butautas" in the LSD)
  Butautas, Bukantas, Bukontas, Bukantis, Butigeidis, Butkintas/Butkus, Butnorius, Butrimas, Butvilas, Butvydas
  Darbutas, Gembutas, Gimbutas, Gimbutis, Kaributas, Kintibutas, Mažbutas, Narbutas, Norbutas, Seibutis, Vembutas, Vilbutas

== D ==
- Dár-: from daryti, "to do", "to make"
  Darbutas, Dargis, Darvydas
- -dau-, most probably from daug, "much" (search for "Daubaras" in the LSD)
  Daumantas, Daukantas, Dautartas, Mindaugas

== G ==
- -gail-; from gaileti/gailus, "sorry", or gailas, "strong" (search for "Bargaila" in the LSD)
  Kęsgaila, Jogaila, Rimgailė, Skirgaila, Švitrigaila, Songaila
- -ged-: the root from gedḗti “to regret; to be sad”, gedēuti “to ask, to search, to inquire, when missing something; to long for; to want, to desire”.
  Gediminas, Gedgaudas, Gedvila, Gedvilas....
  Sirgėdas
- -gird-, -gerd-; from girdeti, išgirsti, "hear" (search for "Girdvainis" in the LSD)
  Girdenis, Girdvainis, Vizgirda

== K ==
- Kal-
  Kalmantas, Kalminas
- Kant-
  Kantautas/Kontautas, Kantalgas, Norkantas
- Kęs, Kens-, connected with kễsti (keñčia) "endure", "suffer"
  Kęsgaila, Kęsminas/Kesminas, Kęsminavičius, Kęstaras, Kęstartas, Kęstautas, Kęstutis, Kęsvilas, Kęsvinas

== L ==
- '-leng-' , "easy", "light"
  Lengvenis, lt:Lengvinas

== M ==
- -mant- is thought to be associated with the word manyti, "to think", " to know", as in mantus, "clever", "cunning"
  Daumantas, lt:Mangirdas, Mantautas, Mantvila/Montvila/Mantvilas/Montvilas, Rimantas, Sudmantas, Vidmantas, Žygimantas (search for "Manginas" in the LSD)
- -min-
  Alminas, Arminas, Lukminas, Mindaugas, Mingaila, Minvydas

== N ==
- -nor-: from norėti, "to want"
  Daunoras, Noreika, Norvaišas, Vainoras, Vaišnoras, Norkantas / Norkus, Norvilas / Norvila

== R ==
- Ra-
  Ramantas, Ratautas
- Rad-
  Radvilas, Radvila, Radvanas, Radvinas
- -rim- from rimti, "calm down", ramus, "calm" (search for "Rimgaila" in the LSD)
  Butrimas, Tautrimas, Rimantas, Rimgaila, Rimvydas

== S ==
- skir-, from skirti:
  Skirgaila / Skirgailė, Skirmantas
- sūd-:
  Sudmantas (Sudemunt, Sudimont, Sudymont; see lt:Sudimantai), Sudmantis, Sudgintas, Sudvinas
- -sur-, probably from Old Prussian sur-gi, "about"
  Survila

== T ==
- Tar-
  Tarvydas, Tarvilas
- -tau-/-taut-; "-tautas" is a very common second part. The Lithuanian word wikt:tautà is a cognate of Latvian tautà and Old Prussian tauto, all meaning "land, country, region", etc.
  Some examples: Butautas/Butautis, Mantautas, Vytautas, Tautginas, Tautkantas, Tautkus, Tautrimas, Tautvydas/Tautvidas

== V ==
- Vaid-: Several hypotheses of Baltic roots: (1) to see, to know; (2) associated with the verb vaidyti ("to visit, to appear", (3) "to act" (as actor)) or (4) vaidytis (to quarrel).
  Vaidila/Vaidyla/Vaidilas/Vaidilė/Vaidilutis/Vaidilutė, Vaida, Vaidas, Vaidotas/Vaidatas, Vaidutis, Vaidginas, Vaidmanas, Vaidelys/Vaidelis, Vaidulas
- -vel-, -vil- is associated with the word viltis, "hope" (search for "Vilbutas" in the LSD)
  Erdvilas, Butvilas/Butvila, Mantvila/Montvila/Mantvilas/Montvilas, Norvilas/Norvila, Radvila, Survilla, Vìlbutas, Vilmantas
- -vid/vyd- "to see" (a common Indo-Eropean stem; cf. išvysti, видеть, "vision")
  Buivydas, Buitvydas, Manvydas, Rimvydas, Tautvydas/Tautvidas, Vidmantas
- -vin: Kazimieras Būga reports several names with this stem:
  Buivinas, Daugvinas, Gedvinas, Kąsvinas, Kęsvinas, lt:Lengvinas, Lingvinas, Liutvinas, Mantvinas, Mulvinas, Skirvinas, Sudvinas

== Z ==
- Žei-
  lt:Žeimantas, Žeimintas

== See also ==
- Germanic name § Dithematic names
- Slavic names § Dithematic names
