= Algimantas =

Algimantas is a pre-Christian Lithuanian masculine given name, often abbreviated as Algis. Notable people with the name include:

- Algimantas (born 10th century), mythological Grand Duke of Lithuania and father of Ringaudas
- Algimantas Briaunis (born 1964), Lithuanian professional footballer/goalkeeper coach
- Algimantas Butnorius (1946–2017), Lithuanian chess Grandmaster and a former World Senior Champion
- Algimantas Dailidė (1921–2015), former Lithuanian Security Police (Saugumas) official
- Algimantas Adolfas Jucys (1936–1997), Lithuanian theoretical physicist, mathematician
- Algimantas Kezys (1928–2015), photographer born in Lithuania who has lived in the United States since 1950
- Algimantas Liubinskas (born 1951), Lithuanian politician and former manager of the Lithuania national football team
- Algimantas Masiulis (1931–2008), Lithuanian film and theater actor
- Algimantas Merkevičius (born 1969), Lithuanian judoka
- Algimantas Nasvytis (1928–2018), Lithuanian architect
- Algimantas Norvilas (born 1953), Lithuanian politician
- Algimantas Puipa (born 1951), Lithuanian film director and screenwriter
- Algimantas Šalna (born 1959), Lithuanian biathlete and Olympic medalist
- Algimantas Sakalauskas (born 1958), Lithuanian folk artist and wood sculptor
- Algimantas Sėjūnas (born 1941), Lithuanian politician
- Algimantas Valantinas (born 1961), Lithuanian judge
- Algimantas Vincas Ulba (1939–2012), Lithuanian politician
- Algimantas Žižiūnas (born 1940), Lithuanian photographer
