= Algirdas (given name) =

- Gender: Male
- Language: Lithuanian

Origin
- Meaning: "all-hearing"
- Region of origin: Lithuania

Other names
- Alternative spelling: Elgirdas
- Related names: Algis, Elgirdas, Olgierd

Algirdas is a Lithuanian male given name, derived from the Lithuanian terms al ("each, every") and gandas ("news, rumor") or girdintis ("hearing"). Variants of the name include Algis and Elgirdas. Algirdas may refer to:

- Algirdas (1296–1377), Grand Duke of Lithuania
- Algirdas Brazauskas (1932–2010), Lithuanian politician, President and Prime Minister
- Algirdas Budrys (born 1939), Lithuanian musician
- Algirdas Butkevičius (born 1958), Lithuanian politician and Prime Minister
- Algirdas Endriukaitis (born 1936), Lithuanian politician
- Algirdas Julien Greimas (1917–1992), French literary scholar
- Algirdas Kaušpėdas (born 1953), Lithuanian musician and architect
- Algirdas Klimaitis (1923–1988), Lithuanian paramilitary commander
- Algirdas Kumža (born 1956), Lithuanian politician
- Algirdas Lauritėnas (1932–2001), Lithuanian basketball player
- Algirdas Linkevičius (born 1950), Lithuanian basketball player and coach
- Algirdas Monkevičius (born 1956), Lithuanian politician
- Algirdas Paleckis (born 1971), Lithuanian diplomat
- Algirdas Vaclovas Patackas (1943–2015), Lithuanian politician and writer
- Algirdas Petrulis (1915–2010), Lithuanian painter
- Algirdas Petrusevičius (born 1937), Lithuanian politician
- Algirdas Ražauskas (1952–2008), Lithuanian politician
- Algirdas Saudargas (born 1948), Lithuanian politician
- Algirdas Šemeta (born 1962), Lithuanian politician
- Algirdas Šocikas (1928–2012), Lithuanian boxer
- Algirdas Sysas (born 1954), Lithuanian politician
- Algirdas Tatulis (born 19??), Lithuanian paralympic athlete
