= Juozas =

Juozas is a Lithuanian masculine given name, a shortened version of Juozapas, which in turn is the equivalent of English Joseph.

== List of people named Juozas ==
- Juozas Adomaitis-Šernas (1859–1922), Lithuanian scientific writer and book smuggler during the Lithuanian press ban
- Juozas Ambrazevičius (1903–1974), Lithuanian literary historian, better known for his political career and nationalistic views
- Juozas Bagdonas (1911–2005), Lithuanian painter
- Juozas Balčikonis (1885–1969), Lithuanian linguist and teacher, who helped standardize the Lithuanian language
- Juozas Barzda-Bradauskas (1896–1953), Lithuanian Army brigadier genera
- Juozas Bernatonis (born 1953), Lithuanian jurist and politician
- Juozas Bernotas (born 1989), Lithuanian windsurfer
- Juozas Budraitis (born 1940), Soviet and Lithuanian actor
- Juozas Dringelis (born 1935), Lithuanian politician
- Juozas Gabrys (1880–1951), Lithuanian politician and diplomat
- Juozas Girnius (1915–1994), Lithuanian philosopher, existentialist
- Juozas Glinskis (born 1933), Lithuanian playwright
- Juozas Grušas (1901–1986), Lithuanian writer, editor, dramatist and playwright
- Juozas Gruodis (1884–1948), Lithuanian composer, educator and professor
- Juozas Imbrasas (born 1941), former mayor of Vilnius, Lithuania
- Juozas Jagelavičius (1939–2000), Lithuanian rower
- Juozas Jankus (1912–1999), Lithuanian painter
- Juozas Jurgėla (1911–1961), Lithuanian basketball player
- Juozas Kalinauskas (born 1935), Lithuanian sculptor and medalist
- Juozas Kamarauskas (1874–1946), Lithuanian painter
- Juozas Kaminskas (1898–1957), Lithuanian painter
- Juozas Karvelis (born 1934), Lithuanian politician
- Juozas Kazickas (born 1918), Lithuanian-American businessman and philanthropist
- Juozas Kralikauskas (1910–2007), Lithuanian novelist and short story author
- Juozas Lebednykas (born 1947), Lithuanian artist and sculptor
- Juozas Lukša (1921–1951), one of the most prominent post-World War II resistance leaders in Lithuania
- Juozas Maniušis (1910–1987), communist politician in Lithuanian
- Juozas Miltinis (1907–1994), Lithuanian theatre director, founder of the Panevėžys Drama Theatre
- Juozas Naujalis (1869–1934), Lithuanian composer, organist and choir conductor
- Juozas Olekas (born 1955), Lithuanian surgeon and politician, Minister of National Defence
- Juozas Paukštelis (1899–1981), Lithuanian author and translator
- Juozas Petkevičius (born 1948), Lithuanian basketball coach
- Juozas Rimas (born 1942), Lithuanian oboist and professor at the Lithuanian Academy of Music and Theatre
- Juozapas Skvireckas (1873–1959), Lithuanian former Archbishop of Kaunas
- Juozas Tūbelis (1882–1939), Lithuanian politician, Prime Minister, and member and chairman of the Lithuanian Nationalists Union
- Juozas Tumas-Vaižgantas (1869–1933), Lithuanian writer, priest, social activist, literary historian, and founder of the Party of National Progress
- Juozas Tunaitis (1928–2012), Roman Catholic titular bishop
- Juozas Ūdras (1925–1991), Soviet Olympic fencer
- Juozas Urbšys (1896–1991), Lithuanian diplomat, the last head of foreign affairs in independent interwar Lithuania, and a translator
- Juozas Vilpišauskas (born 1899), Lithuanian cyclist and Olympic competitor
- Juozas Vinča (1905–1990), Lithuanian boxer
- Juozas Zikaras (1881–1944), Lithuanian sculptor and artist, created the design for pre-war Lithuanian litas coins
- Juozas Žukas (born Joseph Zukas; 1915–1981), Lithuanian-American basketball and tennis player of the 1930s
