= Rimantas =

Rimantas (shortened as Rimas) is a masculine a dithematic pre-Christian Lithuanian name with stems rim + -mant-. The feminine form of the name is Rimantė. Notable people with the name include:

- Rimantas Astrauskas (b. 1955), physicist, ecologist, and signatory of the 1990 Act
- Rimantas Jonas Dagys (born 1957), Lithuanian chemist and politician, member of Seimas (1992–1996, 1996–2000), since 2008 minister
- Rimantas Dichavičius (born 1937), Lithuanian photographer
- Rimantas Dūda (born 1953), Lithuanian painter
- Rimantas Grigas (born 1962), Lithuanian basketball coach, currently signed with Žalgiris Kaunas
- Rimantas Kaukėnas (born 1977), Lithuanian basketballplayer
- Rimantas Norvila, bishop
- Rimantas Sakalauskas (b. 1951), Lithuanian sculptor and a recipient of the Lithuanian National Prize
- Rimantas Antanas Stankevičius (1944–1990), cosmonaut
- Rimantas Šidlauskas (born 1962), diplomat, ambassador
- Rimantas Šulskis (1943–1995), Lithuanian sculptor and painter
- Rimantas Taraškevičius (b. 1949), politician, mayor of Klaipėda
- Rimantas Žvingilas (born 1973), Lithuanian international football striker
