= Survila =

- Lithuanian surname
- m.: Survila
- f.: (unmarried): Survilaitė
- f.: (married): Survilienė

Survila, sometimes spelled as Survilla, is a Lithuanian surname derived from a two-stem Pre-Christian Lithuanian name, with stems sur- + -vil. Notable people with the surname include:

- Ivonka Survilla (born 1936), President of the Rada of the Belarusian Democratic Republic
- Juozas Survila (1921–1947), Lithuanian anti-Soviet partisan
- Maria Paula Survilla (1964–2020), American professor of ethnomusicology and an ethnocultural activist
- Rimvydas Raimondas Survila (born 1939), Lithuanian politician

== See also ==
- Surviliškis
- Surville, different origin
