= Montvila =

- Lithuanian surname
- m.: Montvila
- f.: (unmarried): Montvilaitė
- f.: (married): Montvilienė
- Related names: Montwiłł

Montvila is a Lithuanian surname, variant of Mañtvila, which is a dithematic pre-Christian Lithuanian name: man(t)- + -vil. It may also be used as a surname. The root -mant- is thought to be associated with the word 'manýti, "to think, " to know", as in mantus, "clever", "cunning". The root -vil- is associated with the word vìltis, "hope". Notable people with the surname include:

- Juozapas Montvila(1850–1911), Polish-Lithuanian social worker, bank owner and philanthropist
- Vytautas Montvila (1 June 1935 – 13 July 2003) was a Lithuanian composer, bassoonist and sound engineer
- Vytautas Montvila (poet) (1902–1941), Lithuanian poet, translator
