= Povilaitis =

- Lithuanian surname
- m.: Povilaitis
- f.: (unmarried): Povilaitytė
- f.: (married): Povilaitienė

Povilaitis is a Lithuanian-language surname derived from the given name Povilas, or Paul. Notable people with the surname include:

- Augustinas Povilaitis (1900–1941), Lithuanian Army officer
- Angela Povilaitis, American former assistant attorney general
- Monika Povilaitytė (born 1994), Lithuanian beach volleyball player
- Pranas Povilaitis, Lithuanian politician, M.P.
- Stasys Povilaitis (1947–2015), Lithuanian artist
