= Domantas =

Lithuanian masculine given name

Domantas is a dithematic pre-Christian Lithuanian name with stems, do- + -mant-. The origin of the first stem is unclear. Kazimieras Būga equates the name with "Daumantas" (Russian: Дoвмoнтъ, Дoвмантъ), however there is an evidence of independent derivation. It may refer to:

- Domantas Antanavičius (born 1998), is a Lithuanian footballer
- Domantas Razauskas (born 1983), Lithuanian singer-songwriter and poet
- Domantas Sabonis (born 1996), Lithuanian-American basketball player
- Domantas Šeškus (born 1991), Lithuanian basketball player
- Domantas Šimkus (born 1996), Lithuanian football
