= Povilionis =

- Lithuanian surname
- m.: Povilonis
- f.: (unmarried): Povilionytė
- f.: (married): Povilionienė

Povilionis is a Lithuanian surname. Notable people with the surname include:

- Vidmantas Povilionis (born 1948), Lithuanian politician and diplomat
- Veronika Povilionienė (born 1946), Lithuanian folk musician and singer
