= Paulius =

List of people named Paulius

- Gender: Male
- Language: Lithuanian

Origin
- Region of origin: Lithuania

Other names
- Related names: Povilas; Paulas

Paulius is a Lithuanian masculine given name, which is a cognate of the name Paul, from the Latin Paulus, meaning "small" or "humble". The name may refer to:

- Paulius Andrijauskas (born 1984), Lithuanian swimmer
- Paulius Antanas Baltakis (1925–2019), Lithuanian Roman Catholic prelate
- Paulius Dambrauskas (born 1991), Lithuanian basketball player
- Paulius Galaunė (1890–1988), Lithuanian art historian and artist
- Paulius Golubickas (born 1999), Lithuanian footballer
- Paulius Grybauskas (born 1984), Lithuanian footballer
- Paulius Ivanauskas (born 1996), Lithuanian basketball player
- Paulius Jankūnas (born 1984), Lithuanian basketball player
- Paulius Juodis (born 1978), Lithuanian basketball coach
- Paulius Jurkus (1916–2004), Lithuanian painter
- Paulius Paknys (born 1984), Lithuanian footballer
- Paulius Petrilevičius (born 1991), Lithuanian basketball player
- Paulius Pultinevičius (born 2001), Lithuanian chess player
- Paulius Saudargas (born 1979), Lithuanian physicist and politician
- Paulius Širvys (1920–1979), Lithuanian poet
- Paulius Valinskas (born 1995), Lithuanian basketball player
- Paulius Viktoravičius (born 1984), Lithuanian swimmer
- Paulius Žalys (born 1995), Lithuanian basketball player

== See also ==
- Povilas
