= Vidmantas =

- Gender: Male

Origin
- Region of origin: Lithuania

Vidmantas is a dithematic pre-Christian Lithuanian masculine given name with stems -vid- and -mant-. It may refer to the following individuals:

- Vidmantas Bačiulis (born 1940), Lithuanian screenwriter, film and TV film director
- Vidmantas Bartulis (1954–2020), Lithuanian composer
- Vidmantas Jažauskas (born 1961), Lithuanian painter, book illustrator, poet and social activist
- Vidmantas Jusionis (born 1961), Lithuanian painter
- Vidmantas Mališauskas (born 1963), Lithuanian chess Grandmaster
- Vidmantas Plečkaitis (born 1957), Lithuanian painter, artist, public figure and politician
- Vidmantas Povilionis (born 1948), Lithuanian politician
- Vidmantas Vyšniauskas (born 1969), Lithuanian football midfielder
- Vidmantas Žiemelis (born 1950), Lithuanian politician
