= Armonas =

- Lithuanian surname
- m.: Armonas
- f.: (unmarried): Armonaitė
- f.: (married): Armonienė

Armonas is a Lithuanian surname. Notable people with the name include:

- Aušrinė Armonaitė (born 1989), Lithuanian politician
- Barbara Armonas (Barbora Armonienė, 1908–2008), Lithuanian political prisoner in the Soviet Union
- Regyna Armonas, Canadian volleyball player

== See also ==
- Arminas
