= Vaida =

Vaida may refer to:

== Places ==
- Vaida, Estonia, a borough in northern Estonia
- Vaida Bay, a bay in the far northwest of Russia
  - Vayda-Guba, a rural locality in Murmansk Oblast, Russia
- Vaida, a village in the commune of Roșiori, Bihor, Romania
- Vaida-Cămăraș, a village in Căianu Commune, Cluj County, Romania

== People ==
- Alexandru Vaida-Voevod (1872–1950), Romanian politician
- Gheorghe Elemer Vaida (1936–2017) Romanian chemist-engineer
- Veronica Vaida (born 1950), Romanian-American chemist
- Vaida Pikauskaitė (born 1991), Lithuanian cyclist
- Vaida Žūsinaitė (born 1988), Lithuanian runner
- Vaida Žitinevičiūtė, Lithuanian gymnast; see 2015 World Artistic Gymnastics Championships – Women's qualification
- Vaida Sipavičiūtė (born 1985), Lithuanian basketball player

== See also ==
- Vaidas, a Lithuanian given name
- Vajda, a Hungarian surname
- Vayda, a surname
- Wajda (surname), a Polish surname
- Wayda, a Bollywood film
