= Arminas =

- Lithuanian surname
- m.: Arminas
- f.: (unmarried): Arminaitė
- f.: (married): Arminienė

Arminas is a Lithuanian given name and surname. Feminine form of the given name: Arminė. Notable people with the name include:

- Arminas Narbekovas
- Arminas Urbutis
- Arminas Kazlauskis
- Arminas Vasiljev (born 2003), Public figure
- Arminas Lydeka (born 1968), Lithuanian political scientist, political and public figure
- Anicetas Arminas (1931–1998), Lithuanian choir conductor, pedagogue, doctor of humanities

== See also ==
- Armonas
