= Žygimantas =

Name list

- Gender: Male
- Language: Lithuanian

Origin
- Meaning: Protection through victory
- Region of origin: Lithuania

Other names
- Related names: Sigismund, Sigmund, Siegmund

Žygimantas is a Lithuanian masculine given name. a variant: Žygmantas. It is a dithematic pre-Christian Lithuanian name consisting of two stems: žyg- and -mant-. The Lithuanian word žygis means a military march from one location to another, while the second part might stem from the word manta, meaning wealth, benefit or mantus, which means convenient, suitable. The name is commonly confused with Sigismund (Polish: Zygmunt), in particular when naming the rulers of Lithuania.

Notable people with the name include:

- Žygimantas II of Lithuania (1467–1548), King of Poland and Grand Duke of Lithuania
- Žygimantas Augustas (1520–1572), King of Poland and Grand Duke of Lithuania
- Žygimantas Janavičius (born 1989), Lithuanian basketball player
- Žygimantas Jonušas (born 1982), Lithuanian basketball player
- Žygimantas Kęstutaitis (1365–1440), Grand Duke of Lithuania
- Žygimantas Skučas (born 1992), Lithuanian basketball player
- Žygimantas Stanulis (born 1993), Lithuanian weightlifter
