= Butrym =

Butrimas (Polonized form: Butrym) is a noble surname of Polish–Lithuanian Commonwealth belonging to the Topor heraldic clan. The Russified version is Butrim.

The derived surname is Butrymowicz, literally meaning "descendant of Butrym". Another derivation is the Russian noble Butrimov family.

Butrym or Butrim may refer to:

- Seweryn Butrym (1910–1981), Polish theater, film and television actor, and theater director
- Vitaliy Butrym, Ukrainian sprinter
- Józwa Butrym, a fictional character from the novel The Deluge by Sienkiewicz
