= Tautvydas =

Lithuanian male given name

Tautvydas is a two-stemmed pre-Christian Lithuanian name: taut='tauta'="land, nation, kindred, tribe" + vyd='vysti', vydėti, with the meaning "too see", as in "to understand". The name Vytautas is combined from the same stems. Notable people with the name include:

- Tautvydas Eliošius, Lithuanian professional footballer
- Tautvydas Lydeka, Lithuanian former professional basketball player
- Tautvydas Pipiras, Lithuanian basketball player
- Tautvydas Sabonis (born 1992), Lithuanian basketball coach and former player
- Tautvydas Šležas, Lithuanian basketball TV analyst and assistant coach
- Tautvydas Strolia, Lithuanian cross-country skier
