= Daumantas =

Daumantas (Ruthenian: Dowmont or Domont; Belarusian: Daŭmont; Russian: Довмонт) is a dithematic pre-Christian Lithuanian name with stems dau + -mant-. It may also be used as a surname.

== Given name ==
- Daumantas of Lithuania, Grand Duke of Lithuania (1282–1285)
- Daumantas of Pskov, Prince of Pskov (1266–1299), previously Duke of Nalšia, Lithuania
- Daumantas, nom de guerre of Juozas Lukša, post-World War II anti-Soviet Lithuanian partisan leader

== Surname ==
- Juozas Lukša-Daumantas (1921–1951), Lithuanian anti-Soviet resistance fighter
- Tomas Daumantas (born 1975), Lithuanian footballer
- Vladas Daumantas (1885–1977), Lithuanian politician, diplomat, bibliophile and collector

== See also ==
- Domantas, given name
