= Songaila =

- Lithuanian surname
- m.: Songaila, Sungaila
- f.: (unmarried): Songailaitė, Sungailaitė
- f.: (married): Songailienė, Sungailienė

Songaila is the masculine form of a Lithuanian family name. Its feminine forms are: Songailienė (Samogitian: Songālienė; married woman or widow) and Songailaitė (Samogitian: Songālaitė; unmarried woman). Variants Sungaila or Sungail were mentioned in the Treaty of Königsberg (1390). It is based on the pre-Christian Lithuanian name. Similar names are Sangaila, Songailas.

There is a place Sungailiškiai in Tauragė District Municipality, Lithuania, named after the surname.

Notable people with the surname include:

- Darius Songaila – Lithuanian basketball player
- Ringaudas Songaila – high-ranked politician of the Lithuanian SSR
- Gintaras Songaila – politician, chairman of the Lithuanian Nationalists Union
- Mykolas Songaila – architect
- Jonas Sungaila (1398 – after 1433), nobleman of the Grand Duchy of Lithuania
- Loreta Sungailienė (born 1977), Lithuanian ethnolinguist, folklore performer and TV host
