= Olgierd (given name) =

- Pronunciation: Polish: [ˈɔlɡʲɛrt]
- Gender: Male
- Language: Polish
- Name day: 11 February, 4 November

Origin
- Region of origin: Poland

Other names
- Related names: Algirdas, Algis, Elgirdas

Olgierd is a Polish masculine given name. Individuals with the name Olgierd include:

- Olgierd Ciepły (1936–2007), Polish hammer thrower
- Olgierd Darżynkiewicz (1923–2000), Polish sports shooter
- Karol Olgierd Borchardt (1905–1986), Polish writer and captain of the Polish Merchant Marines
- Olgierd Geblewicz (born 1972), Polish politician
- Olgierd Łukaszewicz (born 1946), Polish film actor
- Olgierd Moskalewicz (born 1974), Polish soccer player
- Olgierd Porebski (1922–1995), Polish-born British fencer
- Olgierd Stański (born 1973), Polish discus thrower
- Olgierd Straszyński (1903–1971), Polish conductor
- Olgierd Zienkiewicz (1921–2009), British academic, mathematician and civil engineer
