= Adamkavičius =

- Lithuanian surname
- m.: Adamkavičius
- f.: (unmarried): Adamkavičiūtė
- f.: (married): Adamkavičienė
- Related names: Adamkiewicz, Adomkavičius, Adamkevičius

Adamkavičius is a Lithuanian surname, a Lithuanized form of the Polish surname Adamkiewicz. Notable persons with the surname include:

- Edvardas Adamkavičius, Lithuanian military officer
- Ignas Adamkavičius (1896– 1987), one of the first Lithuanian military pilots
- Voldemaras Adamkavičius, birth name of Valdas Adamkus (born 1926), Lithuanian politician, twice President of Lithuania
