= Gimbutas =

- Lithuanian surname
- m.: Gimbutas
- f.: (unmarried): Gimbutaitė
- f.: (married): Gimbutienė

Gimbutas is a Lithuanian surname originated as a two-stemmed pre-Christian Lithuanian name: gim-, likely from gin- gi̇̀nti ("to repel an attack, to block...") and but- from bū́ti, "to be". The first recorded usage of the name is from the legendary dynasty of Palemonids: Gimburas, duke of Samogitia. The name was recorded in several forms: Gémbuta, Gémbūta, Gémbutas, Gimbutis, Gimbūtis. In Belarus there are villages associated with the name: Gimbuty and Gimbatawka.

Notable people with the surname include:

- Antanas Gimbutas (1941–2013), Lithuanian draughts composer and solver, draughts activist
- Jurgis Gimbutas, (1918–2001), architect, Lithuanian press and public figure, doctor of engineering sciences
- Marija Gimbutas (Marija Birutė Alseikaitė-Gimbutienė, 1921–1994), Lithuanian archaeologist and anthropologist
