= Budraitis =

- Lithuanian surname
- m.: Budraitis
- f.: (unmarried): Budraitytė
- f.: (married): Budraitienė
- f.: (short): Budraitė

Budraitis is a Lithuanian patronymic surname derived from the ancient Lithuanian given name Budrys. Notable people with the surname include:

- Ieva Budraitė (born 1992), Lithuanian politician
- Juozas Budraitis (born 1940), Lithuanian actor
