= Rimas =

- Gender: 1. Male
- Language: 1. Lithuanian

Origin
- Origin: 1. Shortened form of Rimantas

Other names
- Related names: Rima, Rimutis

Rimas is a Lithuanian surname and a masculine given name. As a given name, Rimas is a shortened form of Rimantas.

== Given name ==
- Rimas Álvarez Kairelis (born 1974), Argentine rugby player of Lithuanian ancestry
- Rimas Kurtinaitis (born 1960), Lithuanian basketball player and trainer
- Rimas Tuminas (born 1952), Lithuanian theatre director

== Surname ==
As a Lithuanian surname it has feminine forms: Rimienė (married woman) and Rimaitė (maiden name).

- Juozas Rimas (born 1942), Lithuanian musician
- Robertas Rimas (born 1971), Lithuanian judoka
