= Lukminas =

- Lithuanian surname
- m.: Lukminas
- f.: (unmarried): Lukminaitė
- f.: (married): Lukminienė

Lukminas is a pre-Christian Lithuanian name constructed of two components: '-Luk' + '-min-'.

- Darius Lukminas
- Tomas Lukminas
