= Baltake =

Baltake may refer to:

- Joe Baltake (1945–2020), American film critic and film historian
- Baltakė, short feminine form of the Liuhuanian surname Baltakis
