= Čiulai =

- Village
- Location within Lithuania
- Coordinates: 55°13′59″N 25°38′17″E
- Country: Lithuania
- County: Utena County
- Municipality: Molėtai district municipality
- Eldership: Mindūnai eldership

Population (2011)
  - Total: 38
- Time zone: UTC+2 (EET)
  - Summer (DST): UTC+3 (EEST)

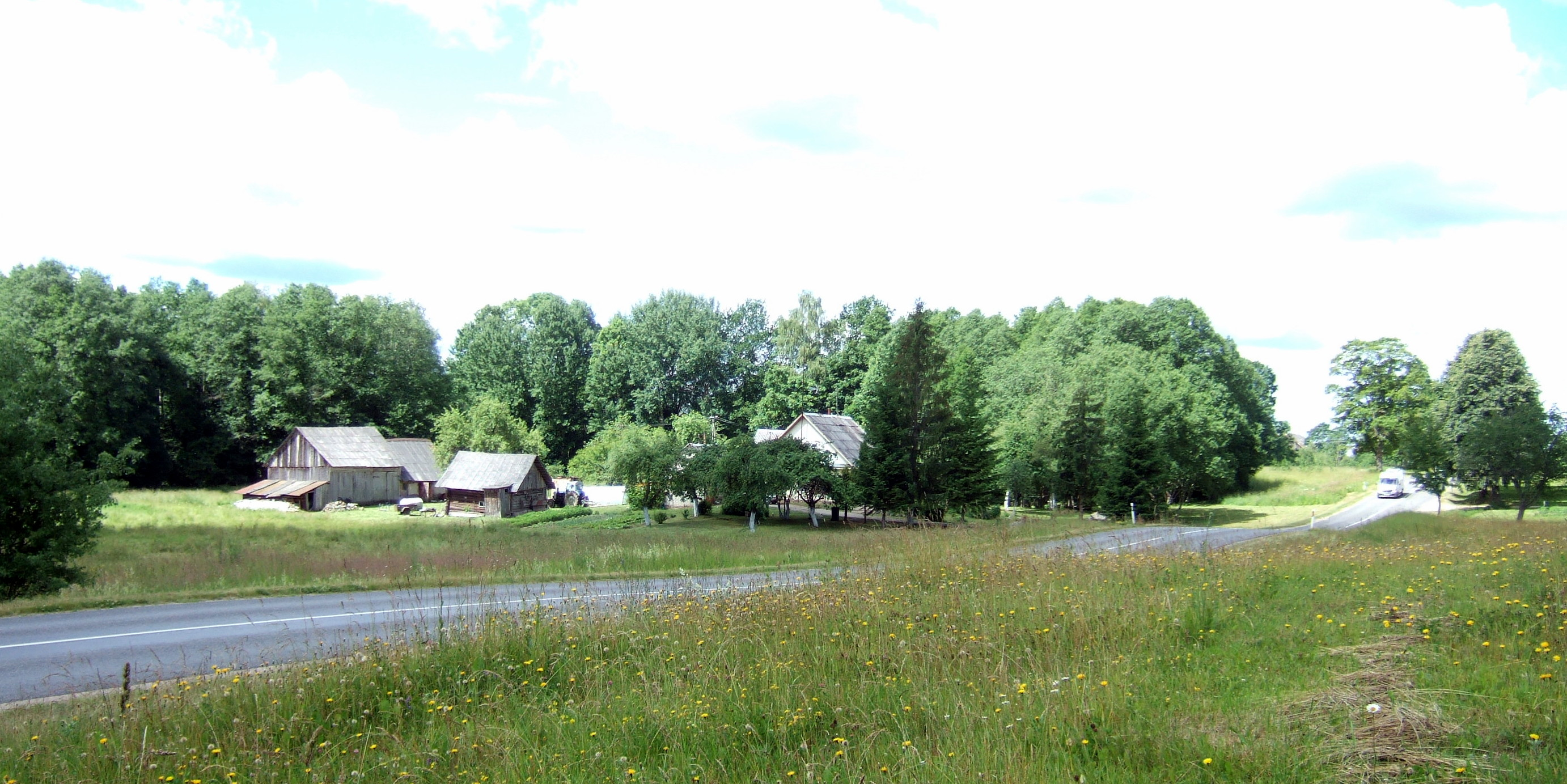
Village of Ciulai in 2014

Čiulai is a small village, located about 4 kilometres (2.5 mi) east of Mindūnai along the Highway 114 in the municipality of Molėtai, Lithuania. As of 2011, it had a population of 38 people. Two small lakes lie to the southeast of the village, Tramys I and II and the larger Baltieji Lakajai.

== History ==
The village was first mentioned in baptismal records of Molėtai in 1688. In 1941, the Čiulai estate was devastated by the Red Army according to the Lithuanian Archives.

== Notable people ==
- Povilas Budrys (born 1962) stage actor
