= Rimantė =

- Gender: Female
- Name day: 22 August, 19 December

Origin
- Origin: Lithuanian
- Region of origin: Lithuania

Other names
- Related names: Rimantas, Arimantė, Gerimantė

Rimantė is a Lithuanian feminine given name. It is the feminine form of the masculine given name Rimantas. Individuals bearing the name Rimantė include:

- Rimantė Jonušaitė (born 2003), Lithuanian footballer
- Rimantė Šalaševičiūtė (born 1954), Lithuanian politician, lawyer, and ombudsman
- Rimantė Valiukaitė (born 1970), Lithuanian actress
