= Butvilas =

- Lithuanian surname
- m.: Butvilas
- f.: (unmarried): Butvilaitė
- f.: (married): Butvilienė

Butvilas is a Lithuanian surname

- Dominykas Butvilas, Lithuanian rally driver
- Edas Butvilas (born 2004) is a Lithuanian tennis player
- Ruta Railaite-Butviliene (born 1958), Lithuanian dancer, choreographer and teacher
