= Gedvilas =

- Lithuanian surname
- m.: Gedvilas
- f.: (unmarried): Gedvilaitė
- f.: (married): Gedvilienė

Gedvilas is a Lithuanian surname. Notable people with the surname include:

- Aidas Gedvilas (born 1966), Lithuanian politician
- Aistė Gedvilienė, Lithuanian politician
- Martynas Gedvilas (born 1989), Lithuanian politician
- Mečislovas Gedvilas, Lithuanian and Soviet politician
- Vydas Gedvilas, Lithuanian politician
