= Vaidotas (name) =

- Gender: Male
- Name day: 16 March

Origin
- Region of origin: Lithuania

Other names
- Related names: Vaidas

Vaidotas is a Lithuanian masculine given name. People with the name Vaidotas include:

- Vaidotas (fl. 1362), Lithuanian noble, son of Kęstutis, Grand Duke of Lithuania
- Vaidotas Šilėnas (born 1985), Lithuanian footballer
- Vaidotas Šlekys (born 1972), Lithuanian footballer
- Vaidotas Valiukevičius (born 1981), Lithuanian musician, lead singer of the Lithuanian pop rock band The Roop
