= Kęsgaila =

- Lithuanian surname
- m.: Kęsgaila
- f.: (unmarried): Kęsgailaitė
- f.: (married): Kęsgailienė
- Origin: Kęs- + gail
- Related names: Kieżgajło

Kęsgaila is a Pre-Christian Lithuanian name belonging to the Lithuanian noble Kęsgaila family. It was Polonized as Kieżgajło. It may also be pronounced as Kensgaila, Kenzgaila, or Kinzgaila. Notable people with the surname include:

- Jonas Kęsgaila (died 1485), nobleman of the Grand Duchy of Lithuania
- Jonas Stanislovaitis Kęsgaila (1549–1594)
- Leonas Kęsgaila-Kenstavičius (1895–1979), Lithuanian doctor, lieutenant colonel of the medical service
- Mykolas Kęsgaila (died 1450), nobleman of the Grand Duchy of Lithuania
- Mykolas Kęsgaila (died 1476), nobleman of the Grand Duchy of Lithuania
- Stanislovas Kęsgaila (died 1527), nobleman of the Grand Duchy of Lithuania
- Stanislovas Kęsgaila (died 1532) (died 1532), nobleman of the Grand Duchy of Lithuania
- Stanislovas Kęsgaila (died 1554) (died 1554). nobleman of the Grand Duchy of Lithuania
