= Surville =

Surville may refer to:

== People ==
- Clotilde de Surville (c. 1405–1498), supposed French author
- Jean-François-Marie de Surville (1717–1770), French trader and navigator
- Louis-Charles de Hautefort de Surville (1656–1721), French nobleman and military officer

== Places ==
- Surville, Calvados, a commune in France
- Surville, Eure, a commune in France
- Surville, Manche, a commune in France
- a northern quarter of the city of Montereau-Fault-Yonne, Seine-et-Marne, France
- the Surville Cliffs, the northernmost point of the North Island of New Zealand

== See also ==
- Survilla
- Survilliers
- Suville
