= Adamkiewicz =

Adamkiewicz is a Polish surname. It is a patronymic surname derived from the name Adamek, a diminutive of Adam.Archaic feminine forms: Adamkiewiczowa (after husband), Adamkiewiczówna (after father). They can still be used colloquially. Its Russified form is Adamkevich, Lithuanized: Adamkevičius, Adamkavičius, Adomkevičius.

People with this surname include:

- Albert Wojciech Adamkiewicz (1850–1921), Polish pathologist
- Brian Adamkiewicz, American surfer, skateboarder, and filmmaker
- Edmund Adamkiewicz (1920–1991), German footballer
- Maciej Adamkiewicz (1966–2025), Polish pharmaceutical businessman and surgeon
- Małgorzata Adamkiewicz, Polish pharmaceutical businesswoman and medical doctor
- Patrycja Adamkiewicz, Polish taekwondo athlete

== See also ==
- Artery of Adamkiewicz
- Adamkiewicz reaction
