= Almantas =

Almantas is a pre-Christian Lithuanian masculine given name. Notable people with the name include:

- Almantas Grikevičius (1935–2011), Lithuanian film director
- Almantas Leika, Lithuanian general inducted into the United States Army War College International Fellows Hall of Fame
- Almantas Petkus, Lithuanian politician, leader of the Order and Justice party
- Almantas Samalavičius (born 1963), Lithuanian cultural scientist, art critic, publicist, and essayist
