= Vilmantas =

Lithuanian masculine given name

Vilmantas is a Lithuanian pre-Christian name that consists of two stems: -vil- is associated with the word viltis, "hope" (search for "Vilbutas" in the LSD), -mant- is thought to be associated with the word manyti, "to think", "to know", as in mantus, "clever", "cunning" (search for "Vilbutas" in the LSD).

Notable people with the name include:

- Benediktas Vilmantas Rupeika, Lithuanian politician
- Vilmantas Dilys (born 1987) is a Lithuanian former professional basketball player
- Vilmantas Marcinkevičius (born 1969), Lithuanian painter
- Vilmantas Tamošaitis, Lithuanian military commander
