= Tarvydas =

- Lithuanian surname
- m.: Tarvydas
- f.: (unmarried): Tarvydaitė
- f.: (married): Tarvydienė

Tarvydas is an ancient Lithuanian surname., and many of them are of compound type, typically consisting of two stems.

- Balys Tarvydas (1897–1980), historian, archaeologist, pedagogue, museologist, Esperanto speaker
- Ruth Tarvydas (1947 – 2014) was an Australian fashion designer
