= Budrys =

- Lithuanian surname
- m.: Budrys
- f.: (unmarried): Budrytė
- f.: (married): Budrienė
- f.: (short): Budrė

Budrys is a Lithuanian surname. It evolved from the ancient Lithuanian personal name Budrys. The patronymic surname Budraitis is derived from this given name.

Notable people with the surname include:

- Algirdas Budrys (born 1939), Lithuanian musician
- Algis Budrys (1931–2008), Lithuanian-American writer
- Dainius Budrys (born 1976), Lithuanian economist, politician, MP
- Daiva Tamošiūnaitė-Budrė (born 1966), Lithuanian radio, TV show and event host and presenter, and politician
- Eugenijus Mindaugas Budrys (1925–2007), Lithuanian painter
- Ignas Budrys (1933–1999), Lithuanian painter
- Jonas Budrys (1889–1964), counterintelligence officer and later a Lithuanian diplomat
- Povilas Budrys (born 1962), Lithuanian actor and artist
- Viktorija Budrytė-Winnersjo (born 1989), Lithuanian footballer

== Fictional characters ==
- Budrys, from Adam Mickiewicz's poem The Three Budrys, who lent his name to a jocular Polish term for "Lithuanian person"
