= Norkus =

- Lithuanian surname
- m.: Norkus
- f.: (unmarried): Norkutė
- f.: (married): Norkienė
- f.: (short): Norkė
- Origin: diminutive of the Lithuanian given name Norkantas

Norkus is a Lithuanian language family name. This surname originates from a nickname which is a derivative of the Lithuanian pre-Christian name Norkantas, which includes the stem noras ‘wish’, ‘desire’, ‘will’ or noréti ‘to want’.

Notable people with the surname include:

- Aušrinė Norkienė
- Caleb Norkus, an American soccer player
- Herbert Norkus, a Nazi martyr, a Hitler Youth member murdered by German Communists
- Kiley Norkus, American women's soccer player
- Renata Mieńkowska-Norkiene (born 11980), Poloish polityologist and sociologist
- Ruta Norkiene, a Lithuanian female curler
- Vytautas Norkus, a 1939 Lithuania national basketball team player
