= Rimvydas =

- Gender: Male
- Language: Lithuanian
- Name day: 5 April

Origin
- Region of origin: Lithuania

Rimvydas is a pre-Christian Lithuanian masculine given name. People bearing the name Rimvydas include:

- Rimvydas Šalčius (born 1985), Lithuanian former swimmer
- Rimvydas Raimondas Survila (born 1939), Lithuanian politician
- Rimvydas Turčinskas (born 1956), Lithuanian politician and physician
- Rimvydas Valatka (born 1956), Lithuanian journalist and signatory of the Act of the Re-Establishment of the State of Lithuania
