= Narbutt =

- Lithuanian surname
- m.: Narbutas
- f.: (unmarried): Narbutaitė
- f.: (married): Narbutienė
- Related names: Russian/Belarusian/Ukrainian:Narbut (Нарбут); Lithuanian: Narbutas/Norbutas

Narbutt and Narbut are Polish-language forms and Narbutas/Norbutas is the Lithuanian-language form of the same noble family name from the Polish–Lithuanian Commonwealth times, Narbutt family or Trąby coat of arms.

Historical Polish feminine forms are Narbutowa (possessive form from "Narbut"), Narbutówna (patronymic form from "Narbut")

The surname may refer to:

- Teodor Narbutt, Polish writer and historian
- Ludwik Narbutt, Polish military commander
- Aleksander Narbutt-Łuczyński, Polish lawyer and military officer
- Heorhiy Narbut, Ukrainian graphic designer, also known as George Narbut
- Vladimir Narbut, Russian poet
- Ona Narbutienė, Lithuanian musicologist and educator
- Onutė Narbutaitė, Lithuanian composer
