= Martinaitis =

- Lithuanian surname
- m.: Martinaitis
- f.: (unmarried): Martinaitytė
- f.: (married): Martinaitienė
- f.: (short): Martinaitė

Martinaitis is a Lithuanian family name. Notable people with the surname include:

- Algirdas Martinaitis, composer, 1989 recipient of the Lithuanian National Prize
- Marcelijus Martinaitis, poet, 1998 recipient of the Lithuanian National Prize
- Žibuoklė Martinaitytė (born 1793), Lithuanian composer
