= Vytautas Grubliauskas =

Lithuanian politician (born 1956)

Member of the Seimas
- Incumbent
- Assumed office 14 November 2024
- Preceded by: Audrius Petrošius
- Constituency: Baltija
- In office 15 November 2004 – 11 April 2011
- Preceded by: Valentinas Greičiūnas
- Succeeded by: Naglis Puteikis
- Constituency: Danė

Mayor of Klaipėda
- In office 12 April 2011 – 5 March 2023
- Preceded by: Rimantas Taraškevičius
- Succeeded by: Arvydas Vaitkus

Personal details
- Born: 1 December 1956 (age 69)
- Party: Social Democratic Party (since 2022); Liberals' Movement (2006–2018)

Vytautas Grubliauskas (born 1 December 1956) is a Lithuanian politician of the Social Democratic Party. He was elected member of the Seimas in the 2024 parliamentary election, having previously served from 2004 to 2011. From 2011 to 2023, he served as mayor of Klaipėda.
