= Butkus =

- Lithuanian surname
- m.: Butkus
- f.: (unmarried): Butkutė
- f.: (married): Butkienė, Butkuvienė
- f.: (short): Butkė
- Origin: diminutive of Butkintas

Butkus is the masculine form of a Lithuanian family name. Its feminine forms are: Butkienė or Butkuvienė (married woman or widow) and Butkutė (unmarried woman). The surname is derived from the diminutive form Butkus of the Lithuanian pre-Christian name Butkintas. Notable people with the surname include:

- Carl Butkus (1922–1978), American football player
- Darius Butkus (born 1972), Lithuanian footballer
- Dick Butkus (1942–2023), American football player
- Goda Butkutė (born 1999), Lithuanian pair skater
- Juozas Butkus, better known as Butkų Juzė (1893–1947), Lithuanian writer
- Luke Butkus (born 1979), American football player
- Rihards Butkus (born 1972), Latvian footballer
- Vytautas Butkus (born 1949), Lithuanian rower
- Zenonas Butkus (born 1951), Lithuanian historian
