= Butrimas =

Butrimas is a Pre-Christian Lithuanian name and surname. It consist of two stems: bu(t)-, "to be" (search for "Butautas" in LSD) and -rim- from rimti, "calm down", ramus, "calm" (search for "Rimgaila" in the LSD). Polonized form: Butrym. Notable people with the surname include:

- Adomas Butrimas (born 1955), Lithuanian art historian, archaeologist, doctor of humanitarian sciences
- Jonas Butrimas (died 1428) nobleman of Polish-Lithuanian Commonwealth
- Jurgis Butrimas nobleman of Polish-Lithuanian Commonwealth
