= Baltakis =

- Lithuanian surname
- m.: Baltakis
- f.: (unmarried): Baltakytė
- f.: (married): Baltakienė
- f.: (short): Baltakė

Baltakis is a Lithuanian surname originated from the Lithuanian nickname "Baltakis" literally meaning "white-eyed". A number of Lithuanian placenames are named after their founders or owners with this name: lt:Baltakiškė, lt:Baltakiškis, lt:Baltakiškės apylinkė.

Notable people with the surname include:

- Algimantas Baltakis (1930–2022), Lithuanian poet, literary critic, editor, translator
- Kęstutis Baltakis (born 1957), Lithuanian badminton player
- Paulius Antanas Baltakis (1925–2019), Lithuanian Roman Catholic prelate
