= Dailučiai =

- Location within Lithuania
- Coordinates: 54°37′20″N 22°53′10″E
- Country: Lithuania
- Ethnographic region: Suvalkija
- County: Marijampolė County
- Municipality: Vilkaviškis district municipality
- Elderate: Virbalis elderate

Population (2011)
  - Total: 147
- Time zone: UTC+2 (EET)
  - Summer (DST): UTC+3 (EEST)

Dailučiai is a small village in Marijampolė County, Lithuania. It is located 3 kilometres (1.9 mi) east from Virbalis near the Marijampolė−Kybartai road. According to the census of 2011, it had 147 residents.

Dailučiai was established after World War I when Versnupiai manor was abolished.

== Famous people ==
Algimantas Sakalauskas, Lithuanian folk artist and wood sculptor, was born in Dailučiai.
