= Povilas =

Povilas is a Lithuanian masculine given name and may refer to:

- Povilas Aksomaitis (1938–2004), Lithuanian engineer, politician, and signatory of the 1990 Act of the Re-Establishment of the State of Lithuania
- Povilas Budrys (born 1962), Lithuanian painter
- Povilas Butkevičius (born 1987), Lithuanian former basketball player
- Povilas Jakubėnas (1871–1953) Lithuanian Calvinist clergyman, general superintendent of the Lithuanian branch of the Reformed Church
- Povilas Leimonas (born 1987), Lithuanian footballer
- Povilas Lukšys (footballer) (born 1979), Lithuanian footballer
- Povilas Matulionis (1860–1932), Lithuanian forester
- Povilas Meškėla (born 1964), Lithuanian rock singer and musician (Rojaus tūzai and Katedra)
- Povilas Mykolaitis (born 1983), Lithuanian long jumper
- Povilas Plechavičius (1890–1973), Imperial Russian and then Lithuanian military officer and statesman
- Povilas Stravinsky, Lithuanian pianist active in the United States
- Povilas Stulga Museum of Lithuanian Folk Instruments, located in Kaunas, Lithuania
- Povilas Tautvaišas (1916–1980), Lithuanian-American chess master
- Povilas Vaitonis (1911–1983), Lithuanian–Canadian International Master of chess
- Povilas Vanagas (born 1970), Lithuanian figure skater
- Povilas Varanauskas (1941–2026), Lithuanian politician
- Povilas Vasiliauskas (born 1953), Lithuanian politician, the president of Klaipeda Association of Industrialists, former mayor of Klaipėda
- Povilas Višinskis (1875–1906), Lithuanian writer, journalist, theatre director, and politician
- Povilas Žadeikis (1887–1957), representative of Lithuania in the United States from 1934 to 1957
