= Dautartas =

- Lithuanian surname
- m.: Dautartas
- f.: (unmarried): Dautartaitė
- f.: (married): Dautartienė

Dautartas is a Lithuanian surname. Notable people with the surname include:

- Edvinas Dautartas (born 1987), Lithuanian swimmer
- Julius Dautartas, Lithuanian politician, MP
- Olita Dautartaitė, Lithuanian actress
- Vladas Dautartas (1927–2000), Lithuanian writer, essayist, and dramatist
