= Algimantas Sėjūnas =

Lithuanian politician

Algimantas Sėjūnas (born 24 April 1941 in Vidiškiai) is a Lithuanian politician. In 1990 he was among those who signed the Act of the Re-Establishment of the State of Lithuania. Sėjūnas graduated from Vilnius University.
