= Juozapas =

Juozapas is a Lithuanian masculine given name. It is a cognate of the English language name Joseph.

== List of people named Juozapas ==
- Juozapas Baka (1707–1780), late Baroque poet, Jesuit priest and missionary
- Juozapas Kazimieras Kosakovskis (1738–1794), bishop
- Juozapas Montvila (1850-1911), social worker, bank owner and philanthropist
- Juozapas Oleškevičius (c.1777–1830), Polish-Lithuanian painter
- Juozapas Senkalskis (1904–1972), painter, printer, etcher and illustrator
- Juozapas Skvireckas (1873–1959), Lithuanian archbishop of Kaunas
