= Juozas Barzda-Bradauskas =

Lithuanian brigadier general

Brigadier general Juozas Barzda–Bradauskas
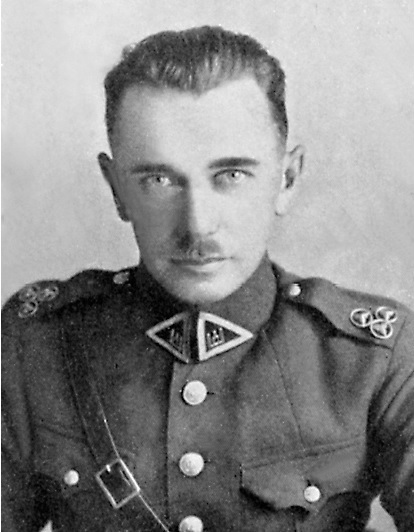
- Bradauskas photographed with uniform of the Lithuanian Army in the 1920s–1930s
- Born: 13 January 1896; Maniškiai, Babtai County
- Died: August 20, 1953 (aged 57); Irkutsk Oblast
- Burial place: Unknown
- Education: Petrograd Third School of the Praporshchiks (1916); War School of Kaunas (1922); École spéciale militaire de Saint-Cyr (1924); University of Lithuania (1929)
- Military career
- Allegiance: Imperial Russian Army (1916–1918); Lithuanian Armed Forces (1919–1940); Lithuanian People's Army (1940)
- Service years: 1916–1940
- Rank: Brigadier General
- Awards: Lithuanian Armed Forces Creators Volunteer Medal (1928); Medal of Independence of Lithuania (1929); Commander's Cross of the Order of the Lithuanian Grand Duke Gediminas (1928); Commander's Cross of the Order of Vytautas the Great (1930); Badges of Honor of Lithuanian and Estonian Firefighters

Juozas Barzda-Bradauskas (13 January 1896 – 20 August 1953) was a Lithuanian brigadier general. He was born in Maniškiai, Babtai County.

== Early life ==
Bradauskas was born in Maniškiai, Babtai County. He studied at Kaunas Boys' Gymnasium.

== World War I ==
During the World War I, Bradauskas was mobilized to the Imperial Russian Army in June 1916 and in November 1916 he graduated from the Petrograd Third School of the Praporshchiks. In 1917 he fought in the Latvian front and in 1918 he was captured as a prisoner of war by the Germans.

== Lithuanian Wars of Independence and the Interwar ==
In 1919 Bradauskas enlisted in the Lithuanian Armed Forces as a volunteer and was the military commandant of the Vilkaviškis county, Kalvarija, Virbalis and Kybartai. In 1919–26 he was a company commander, assistant battalion commander.

In 1922 he graduated from the Higher Officers' Courses at War School of Kaunas, in 1924 – Car Courses for Officers from École spéciale militaire de Saint-Cyr, in 1929 – from Technical Faculty of the University of Lithuania.

In 1926–1927 he was Commander of the Technical Regiment Battalion, Chairman of the Regiment Court, in 1928–1930 (intermittently) Chief of the Military Technical Staff, and in 1930–40 Chief of the Military Housing Division. He was part of the Board of the Kaunas Garrison Officers' Club and took care of the construction of the Kaunas Garrison Officers' Club Building. Moreover, he managed the construction of barracks at Gaižiūnai training ground, Klaipėda, Pagėgiai, Plungė, Tauragė, Ukmergė.

In 1938 he was awarded the rank of brigadier general.

== World War II and Soviet occupation ==
Following the Soviet occupation of Lithuania in 1940, Bradauskas was Chief of the Military Equipment of the so-called Lithuanian People's Army since 8 July 1940.

During the German occupation of Lithuania, he worked in economic companies and at Vytautas Magnus University. In October 1947 he was arrested by the NKVD, charged with cooperation with the Germans. In 1948 he was sentenced and transported to Orsha Prison. In 1948–1953 he was imprisoned in Norilsk and later transferred to a gulag in the Irkutsk Oblast, where he died. His place of burial is unknown.

== Legacy ==
On 23 June 1993 a memorial plaque was unveiled near a house in Savanorių Avenue 65, Kaunas with a text "Šį namą statė ir jame 1938–1947 m. gyveno generolas Juozas Barzda–Bradauskas, miręs tremtyje 1953 m." (English: This house was built by General Juozas Barzda-Bradauskas in which he lived in 1938–1947, he died in exile in 1953).
