= Daukantas =

Daukantas is a Lithuanian surname. Notable people with the surname include:

- Simonas Daukantas (1793–1864), Lithuanian writer ethnographer and historian
- Feliksas Daukantas (1915–1995), Lithuanian painter
- Teodoras Daukantas (1884–1960), Lithuanian Minister of Defense

== See also ==
- Daukantas Square, Old Town, Vilnius
