= Algis Skačkauskas =

Lithuanian painter

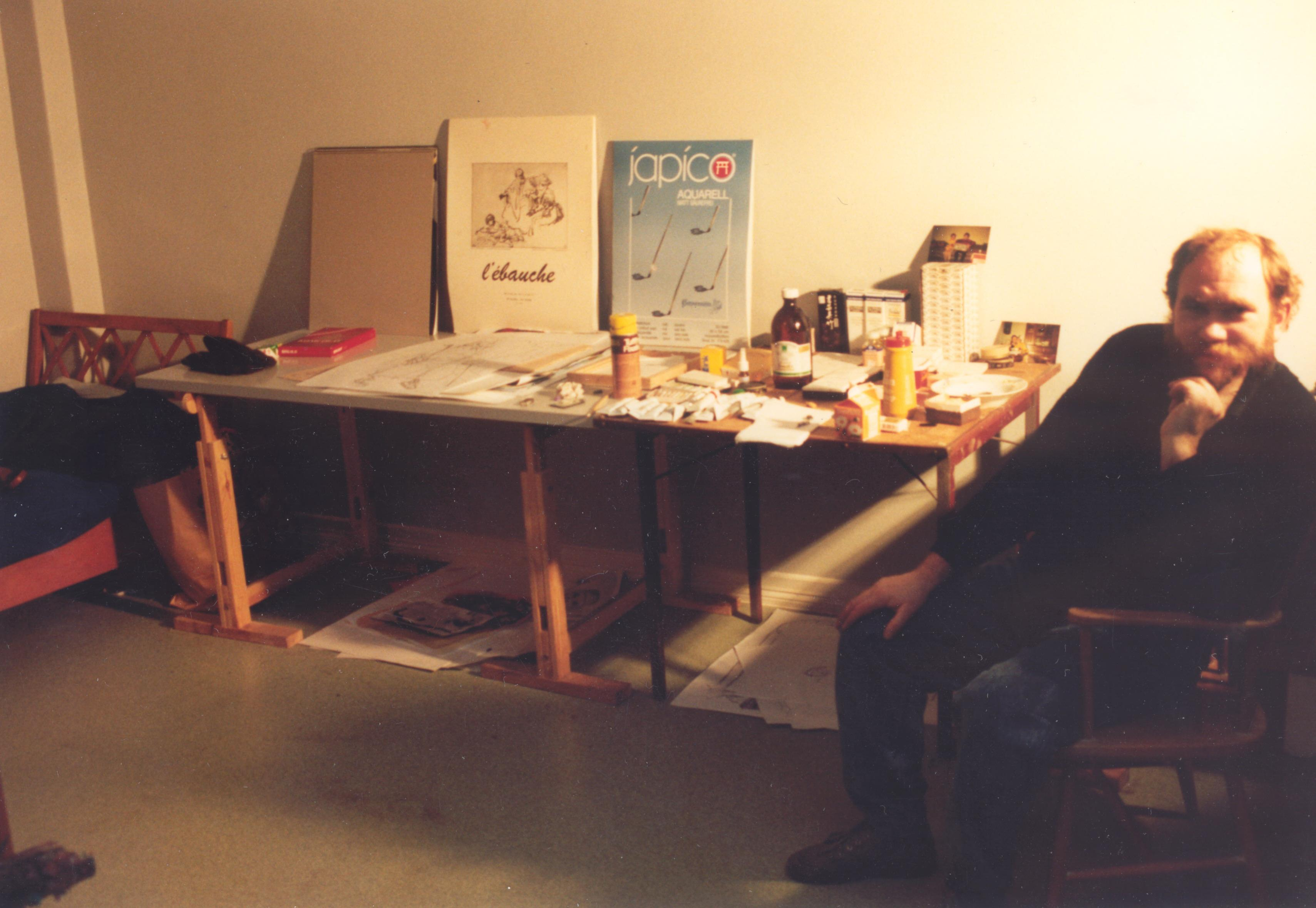
Algis Skačkauskas

Algis Skačkauskas (September 17, 1955 in Prienai district – October 23, 2009 in Vilnius) was a Lithuanian painter. He studied painting at the State Art Institute of Lithuania from 1977 to 1983. After graduation, he worked as a teacher. Skačkauskas held over 20 personal exhibitions. His works are subtle, colorful, often featuring women, people working land, domestic animals.

== Biography ==
From 1963 to 1967, he attended the primary school in Būda (Prienai District Municipality), and from 1967 to 1971, the eight-year school in Kašonys (Prienai District). From 1971 to 1974, he attended Jieznas Secondary School. From 1974 to 1976, he served in the Soviet Army in the 101st Commandant's Detachment in Moscow, Russia. From 1977 to 1983, he studied painting at the Painting Department of the Lithuanian State Institute of Art.

From 1983 to 1986, he was a crafts teacher at Trakai 1st Secondary School. He also taught at Jūratė Stauskaitė's Children's and Youth Art School and at the Vilnius J. Vienožinskis Art School. He participated in exhibitions from 1982. More than 20 solo painting exhibitions were held in Lithuania and abroad, and he exhibited his works in 40 national and international exhibitions. His works were acquired by the Lithuanian Art Museum, the M. K. Čiurlionis National Art Museum in Kaunas, numerous foreign museums, and private collectors. He was a member of the creative team of the 1990 film Miškais ateina ruduo, serving as production designer. He was a laureate of the 8th Baltic Painting Triennial. In 1995, he was awarded a state scholarship of the highest degree for the period 1995–1997.

According to art critics, his works were characterized by original colors, subtlety, and a sensitive approach, making each painting distinctive. Creating emotional, expressive, and spontaneous works, Skačkauskas continued Lithuanian artistic traditions. The theme of myth was important in Algis Skačkauskas's works, as was musicality, which was particularly evident in compositions on the theme of women and expressed through variations in bodily rhythm, colorful nuances, and spatial perception.

He was a member of the Lithuanian Artists' Association and a member of the artists' group 24.
