= Vilkas =

- Lithuanian surname
- m.: Vilkas
- f.: (unmarried): Vilkaitė, Vilkyte
- f.: (married): Vilkienė

Vilkas is a Lithuanian language family name literally meaning 'wolf' in Lithuanian. Notable people with the surname include:

- Eduardas Vilkas (1935–2008), Lithuanian economist and politician
- Pranas Vilkas (born 1936), Lithuanian politician
- Tuula Vilkas (born 1950), Finnish speedskater

== Fictional characters ==
- Vilkas, a warrior and a lycanthrope in The Elder Scrolls V: Skyrim
