= Girdenis =

Lithuanian name

- Lithuanian surname
- m.: Girdenis
- f.: (unmarried): Girdenytė
- f.: (married): Girdenienė
- f.: (short): Girdenė

Girdenis is a Lithuanian surname. It evolved from the ancient Lithuanian personal name Girdenis. Notable people with the surname include:

- Aleksas Girdenis (1937–2011), linguist, creator of the Lithuanian school of phonology
