= Brian Adamkiewicz =

American surfer, skateboarder and filmmaker

Surfing career
- Sport: Surfing
- Major achievements: Won the Cannes Film Festival Emerging Filmmakers Showcase Award

Brian Adamkiewicz is a surfer, skateboarder, and filmmaker who won the Cannes Film Festival Emerging Filmmakers Showcase award for best student documentary for "Build Ramps Not Walls". Adamkiewicz is a graduate of Long Beach High School and lives in Long Beach, NY.
