= Algimantas Kezys =

Algimantas Kezys (1928 – February 23, 2015) was a photographer born in Lithuania who moved to the United States in 1950.

Kezys was ordained as a Jesuit priest in the 1950s; he received a master's degree in philosophy from Loyola University (Chicago) in 1956. He founded the Lithuanian Library Press in Chicago and directed the Lithuanian Youth Center in Chicago between 1974 and 1977.

One of Kezys' first major exhibitions took place in 1965 at the Art Institute of Chicago. Since then his work has been exhibited at a number of American and European museums and in magazines. His photographs are part of the permanent collections at Los Angeles County Museum of Art, the Carnegie Institute in Pittsburgh, Pennsylvania, and at the Art Institute of Chicago. He published several books.

In May 2000 he participated in an exhibition held in Washington D.C., sponsored by the International Monetary Fund. Kezys operated a small gallery in Stickney, Illinois, featuring the art created by Lithuanian artists around the world, and published reviews, catalogs, and books on art, religion, and photography. He died in 2015.

== Sources ==
- Algimantas Kezys website
- The Art of Algimantas Kezys (includes gallery). Lituanus, Volume 27, No. 1 - Spring 1981.
- Algimantas Kezys - A Poet of Photography, Lituanus, Volume 16, No.3 - Fall 1970.
- Chicago-Diverse Architectural Fragments. Exhibition at Fermilab, 2002.

== Bibliography ==
- Cityscapes. ISBN 0-8294-0595-X
- Lithuania Through the Wall: Diary of a Ten-Day Visit to My Native Land. ISBN 0-8294-0479-1
- Photographs of Chicago. ISBN 1-886060-00-2
- Nature, Forms and Forces: Photographs from Our National, State, and Local Parks. ISBN 0-8294-0525-9
- Fragments of Being. ISBN 1-886060-14-2
- Faces of Two Worlds: A Study in Portraits of the Lithuanian Immigrant Experience in the U.S.A. ISBN 0-9617756-1-0
