= Dargis =

Dargis is a surname. Notable people with the surname include:

- Alfonsas Dargis (1909–1996), Lithuanian painter, graphic artist, set designer, and poet
- Manohla Dargis, American journalist, film critic for The New York Times
- Petras Dargis (born 1955), Lithuanian politician
- Robertas Dargis (born 1960), Lithuanian business leader
- Sissel Dargis Morell, Danish filmmaker, artist, and photographer
- Stan Dargis, born Stasys Darginavicius (1928–2004), Australian basketball player

== See also ==
- Lord Dargis, character in the movie Garfield: A Tail of Two Kitties
