= Matheus Butrymowicz =

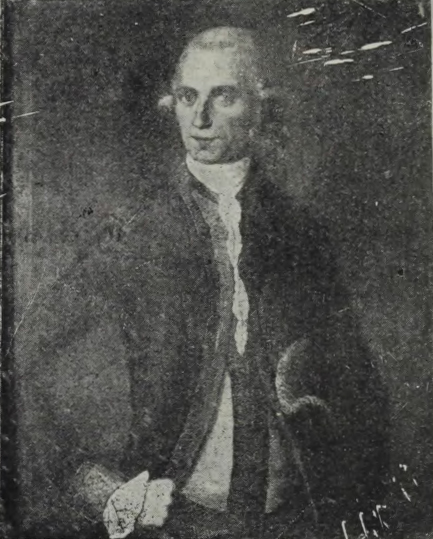
Matheus Butrymowicz

Matheus Butrymowicz (1745–1814) was a Polish-Lithuanian statesman and landlord from Pinsk and a liberal member of the Great Sejm or Diet assembled in Warsaw from 1788 to 1792.

A descendant of one of the oldest families of Lithuania and Samogitia, he took a special interest in the development of the industry and commerce of Poland and Lithuania, and to this end considered it of the utmost importance to utilize the energy and the abilities of the Jewish inhabitants. Together with Castellan Yezierski and other Liberal members of the "last" Polish Sejm, he endeavored to prove to the Polish representatives how harmful to the welfare of the country was the abnormal position of the Jews, and urged the taking of measures leading toward their emancipation. In 1789 he elaborated a plan for transforming the Jews into useful citizens, which he set forth in a pamphlet entitled Sposób Uformowania Zydów Polskich w Pozytecznych Krajowi Obywatelow (Warsaw), and which he submitted to King Stanislaus Poniatowsky at the session of the Diet of Dec. 4, asking the king to favor it with his support. In this pamphlet he points out that the Polish law did not include the Jews in the three estates of the realm (the nobility, country gentry, and burgesses); that the Polish legislation had always regarded the Jews as a foreign element, and, though burdening them with exceptional taxes, had not granted them the rights of citizens, while (he argues) Polish society had treated them with contempt, defamed their religion, and would not tolerate the notion that a Jew could be a son of his fatherland. He adds:

"And after all this, you demand from the Jew that he shall be useful to the country which does not profess to be his father-land, that he shall be faithful and devoted to those who constantly oppress him! The Jew did not take to agriculture, because he did not care to exchange one kind of misery for another; the law would not permit him to own land, and he had no desire to become a serf and to work for others. He showed strong inclinations to trade and industry; but the towns either would not admit him at all to these pursuits, or at best allowed him to be only a haberdasher. It was a constant struggle between the Jews and the Christian merchants: and therein lies the cause of the decay of trade and the impoverishment of the towns."

When the Sejm appointed, in June, 1790, a committee "to reform the condition of the Jews," Butrymowicz was one of its most active members. He pleaded in behalf of the inviolability of the Jewish faith, and of the union of "the peoples" (the Christians and the Jews) by the reception of the latter into the national organism through mutual concessions, through the abolition or the reorganization of the Kahal, and even through the influence of the courts in the propagation of education and culture among the Jewish youths.
