= Algirdas Kumža =

Lithuanian politician

Algirdas Kumža (born 29 November 1956) is a Lithuanian politician, born in Palūkštis. In 1990 he was among those who signed the Act of the Re-Establishment of the State of Lithuania. He was the ambassador to Ukraine from 2006 to 2010.
