= Algirdas Linkevičius =

Lithuanian basketball player and coach

Personal information
- Born: 12 October 1950 (age 74); Tomsk, Russian SFSR, Soviet Union

Algirdas Linkevičius (born 12 October 1950) is a retired Lithuanian basketball player, coach, most notable for his playing career in Žalgiris from 1969 to 1982.

== Early life ==
Linkevičius was Biržai Sports School pupil. His first coach was Vladas Garastas. Onwards, he graduated the Lithuanian Sports University (LVKKI) in 1973. From 2001 to 2010 he worked as a Kaunas District Sports School basketball coach.

== Professional career ==
Linkevičius began his professional sports career in Žalgiris basketball team and played for it from 1969 to 1982. He also represented Kaunas Drobės squad multiple times from 1974 to 1987. Though, his biggest achievements were reached with Žalgiris with which he won the Lithuanian basketball league seven times (1974, 1976, 1978–80, 1986, 1987), USSR tournament silver (1980) and USSR bronze three times (1971, 1973, 1978).

== National team career ==
He played 67 games for the Lithuania SSR men's national team and scored 741 points. He also was the Soviet Union national team member in 1972. Though, he was unable to be a part of it more because he was born in Siberia where his both parents were deported.
