= Rimgailė =

Lithuanian princess

- Born: c. 1367
- Died: 1423 or 1430
- Spouse: Henry of Masovia; Alexander the Good (m. 1419, div. 1421)
- House: Kęstutis family
- Father: Kęstutis
- Mother: Birutė

Rimgailė (also Rymgajla, Rimgaila, Ringaila, Polish: Ryngałła, Romanian: Ringala; c. 1367 – 1423 or 1430) was a Lithuanian princess of the House of Kęstutis. Daughter of the Grand Duke of Lithuania Kęstutis and Grand Duchess Birutė, sister of Grand Dukes Vytautas the Great and Žygimantas Kęstutaitis, Dukes Butautas and Tautvila, and Masovian Duchess Danutė of Lithuania. Baptismal name Ona.

Rimgailė (feminine) or Rimgailas (masculine) is a typical dual-stemmed pagan Lithuanian name constructed from rim- (rimti - "be calm") + gail- (*gailas - "strong"), which is quite common in Lithuania at present.

By marriage with Henry of Masovia, she was Princess of Masovia for about one year, until the death of her husband (winter of 1392–1393). Jan Długosz wrote in his chronicles that to marry her Henry resigned from the title of Bishop of Płock. Henry's death was allegedly due to poison, with Rimgailė as one of the potential suspects.

Her second marriage (1419–1421) was with Alexander the Good, Voivode of Moldavia (1400–1432). Upon their politically motivated divorce she was given the customs of the town of Siret and 40 villages. Also, as part of the divorce settlement Alexander the Good promised to pay her lifetime income worth 600 Hungarian gold ducats or florins payable in two installments.

== See also ==
Ancestors of Rimgailė

8. (possibly) Butvydas
4. Gediminas
2. Kęstutis
10. Ivan of Polatsk
5. (possibly) Jewna
1. Rymgajla
3. Birutė
