= Regyna Armonas =

Canadian volleyball player (born 1955)

Personal information
- Born: 8 September 1955 (age 69); Belleville, Ontario, Canada

Sport
- Sport: Volleyball

Regyna Armonas (born 8 September 1955) is a Canadian volleyball player. She competed in the women's tournament at the 1976 Summer Olympics.
