= Victor Ratautas =

Brazilian footballer

Personal information
- Full name: Victor Ratautas
- Date of birth: 10 March 1934
- Place of birth: São Paulo, Brazil
- Date of death: 30 June 1996 (aged 62)
- Place of death: Santo André, Brazil
- Position: Centre-back

Senior career*
Years	Team	Apps	(Gls)
1952–1954	Juventus	67	(4)
1954–1961	São Paulo	390	(8)
1961–1965	Ponte Preta		
1966	Taubaté		
1967	DERAC Itapetininga		
1968–1969	Saad		

International career
1960	Brazil	4	(0)
- * Club domestic league appearances and goals as of 25 August 2023

Victor Ratautas (born 10 March 1934 – 30 June 1996), was a Brazilian football player, who played as a centre-back.

== Personal life ==
Of Lithuanian descent (and sometimes called as Victor Lituano), Victor was known at the time for his virility and his man-to-man marking ability, being considered one of Pelé's greatest opponents. In São Paulo FC, played alongside Mauro Ramos and Nilton de Sordi, but unlike his teammates, he was never called up to the Brazil national team in an official tournament.

== Death ==
Victor died in the city of Santo André on 30 June 1996.

== Honours ==
=== São Paulo ===
- Small Club World Cup: 1955
- Campeonato Paulista: 1957
