= Vaidas =

- Gender: Male

Origin
- Region of origin: Lithuania

Other names
- Related names: Vaidotas

Vaidas is a Lithuanian masculine given name. It may be a name in itself, as well as a diminutive of the name Vaidotas. Notable people with the name Vaidas include:

- Vaidas Baumila (born 1987), Lithuanian singer and actor
- Vaidas Čepukaitis (born 1989), Lithuanian basketball player
- Vaidas Kariniauskas (born 1993), Lithuanian basketball
- Vaidas Mizeras (born 1973), Lithuanian sprint canoer and Olympic competitor
- Vaidas Sakalauskas (born 1971), Lithuanian chess International Master
- Vaidas Šilėnas (born 1985), Lithuanian footballer
- Vaidas Slavickas (born 1986), Lithuanian footballer
- Vaidas Žutautas (born 1973), Lithuanian footballer and football manager
