= Povilas Vasiliauskas =

Lithuanian politician (born 1953)

Povilas Vasiliauskas (born 29 January 1953) is a Lithuanian politician, the president of Klaipeda Association of Industrialists, former mayor of Klaipėda.

Povilas is a member of the Klaipėda Rotary service club and of the Klaipeda Chamber of Commerce, Industry and Crafts.

Preceded by Office created	List of mayors of Klaipėda; 1990–1992	Succeeded by Benediktas Petrauskas
