= Algimantas Sakalauskas =

Lithuanian folk artist and wood sculptor (born 1958)

- Born: 22 September 1958; Dailučiai, Lithuania
- Known for: sculpture
- Awards: Lithuania Ministry of Culture prize

Algimantas Sakalauskas (September 22, 1958) is a Lithuanian folk artist and wood sculptor.

Born near Vilkaviškis, after high school graduation Sakalauskas moved to Prienai, where he lives and works now. He has created a lot of sculptures, children playgrounds and monuments in Lithuania and other countries. He creates open-air monuments 1.5–13.5 metres (4.9–44.3 ft) in height. Currently, Sakalauskas is the director of "Meninė drožyba" in Prienai.

Sakalauskas is a certified cross maker and A category craft artist. In 2001, he was awarded the Prize of the Lithuanian Ministry of Culture for ethnocultural work. Sakalauskas participated in internationals wood carvers symposiums and exhibitions in Lithuania Poland, Czech Republic, Austria, Germany, Japan.

== Books by Sakalauskas ==
- Sūduvos krašto drožyba, skulptūra, kryždirbystė (Suduva region carving, sculpture cross-making, 2006) ISBN 9986-418-40-2
- Medžio dirbiniai sodyboje (Wood works for homestead, 2009) ISBN 978-9955-703-06-8
