= Rimantas Dichavičius =

Lithuanian photographer (born 1937)

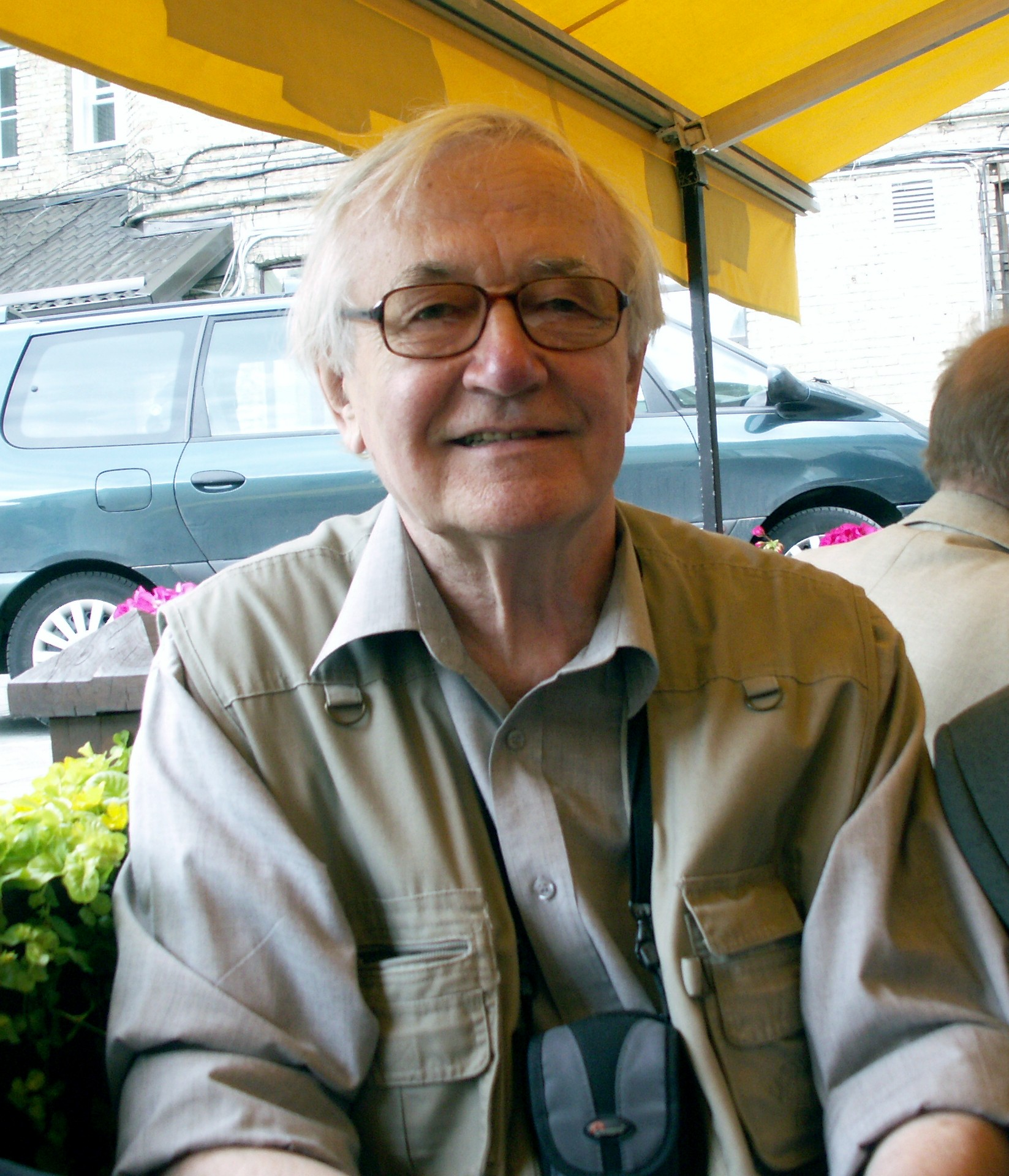
Rimantas Dichavičius

Rimantas Dichavičius (born 1 March 1937, Kelmė volost) is a Lithuanian photographer.
