= Ivonka Survilla =

Belarusian exile politician (born 1936)

- Івонка Сурвілла
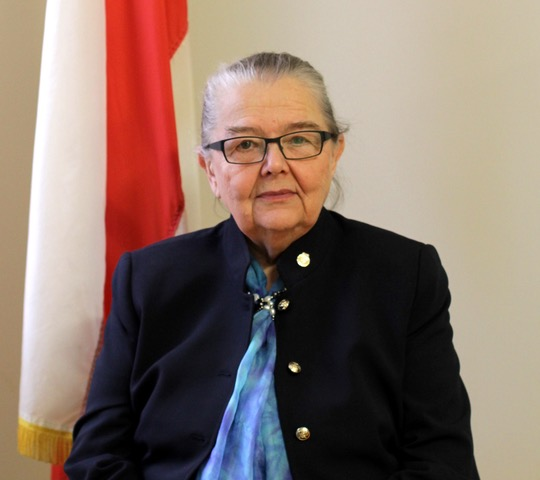
- Survilla in 2016

President of the Rada of the Belarusian Democratic Republic in exile
- Incumbent
- Assumed office 30 August 1997
- Preceded by: Jazep Sažyč

Personal details
- Born: Івонка Шыманец / Iwonka Szymaniec; 11 April 1936 (age 90) Stołpce, Poland (now Stowbtsy, Belarus)
- Spouse: Janka Survilla
- Children: 2; including Maria Paula
- Education: Sorbonne
- Profession: Translator; Painter
- Awards: Queen Elizabeth II Diamond Jubilee Medal
- Website: radabnr.org

Ivonka Survilla (Belarusian: Івонка Сурвілла, born Iwonka Szymaniec, Belarusian: Івонка Шыманец, 11 April 1936) is the President of the Rada of the Belarusian Democratic Republic, a Belarusian government in exile.

== Early life ==
Ivonka Survilla was born Iwonka Szymaniec in Stowbtsy, then part of the Second Polish Republic (Western Belorussia), into the family of Uladzimier Šymaniec, an engineer, and Evelina Šymaniec (née Paškievič).

In 1940, after the Soviet annexation of Western Belorussia, Uladzimier Šymaniec was arrested by the Soviets and sentenced to five years imprisonment in the Gulag. He escaped due to the German invasion of the USSR.

In 1944 the family fled to the West through East Prussia with thousands of other refugees and eventually reached Denmark, where they lived in a refugee camp for several years. On the way Ivonka's younger sister died.

In 1948 her family moved to France and settled in Paris. Šymaniec's family members were active participants in the local Belarusian community. Šymaniec studied at Beaux-Arts de Paris and then graduated from a humanities faculty of the Sorbonne.

In 1959 Ivonka Šymaniec married Janka Survilla, a Belarusian economist, activist and radio broadcaster. With him she moved to Madrid where they ran a Belarusian language radio program supported by Francoist Spain.

== In Canada ==
After the closure of the radio station in 1965, Janka and Ivonka Survilla moved to Canada in 1969 where Ivonka started working as translator for the federal government. She eventually became the head of Translation Services at Health Canada.

In Canada, Ivonka Survilla became an active member of local Belarusian organisations.

In 1989, Ivonka Survilla, with the assistance of her husband Janka Survilla and friends Zinaida Gimpelevitch and Pauline Paszkievicz-Smith, created the Canadian Relief Fund for Chernobyl Victims in Belarus. This charitable organization has provided medical aid in various forms, reciprocal medical staff visits between Canada and Belarus, food aid, and has provided health respites for children in various locations within Canada.

== As president ==
Ivonka Survilla was elected president of the Rada of the Belarusian Democratic Republic in 1997. She is the first woman president of the Rada and the first president elected after the dissolution of the Soviet Union and creation of an independent Republic of Belarus.

Survilla regularly addresses the Belarusian society on March 25 and other occasions.

She is a founding signatory of the Prague Declaration on European Conscience and Communism.

In 2013 she was awarded the Canadian Queen Elizabeth II Diamond Jubilee Medal for "her lifelong work in restoring democracy to Belarus".

== Personal life ==
Ivonka Survilla has two daughters. One of her daughters, Maria Paula Survilla, (1964–2020) was a professor of ethnomusicology at Wartburg College in Waverly, Iowa. Her husband Janka Survilla died in Ottawa in 1997.

Survilla has participated in more than 30 exhibitions as a painter.
