= Algirdas Ražauskas =

Lithuanian politician

Algirdas Ražauskas (March 22, 1952 – February 3, 2008) was a Lithuanian politician, born in Būteniai. In 1990 he was among those who signed the Act of the Re-Establishment of the State of Lithuania.
