= Vayda =

Vayda is a surname. Alternative spellings include Veda, Vada, or Vaeyda.

- Andrew P. Vayda, anthropologist
- Jerry Vayda (born 1934), American basketball player
- Shandor Vayda (born 1991), Ukrainian footballer

== Other uses ==
- Vayda (rapper), American rapper
