= Algirdas Endriukaitis =

Lithuanian politician (born 1936)

Algirdas Endriukaitis (born 23 November 1936) is a Lithuanian politician, born in Kaunas. In 1990 he was among those who signed the Act of the Re-Establishment of the State of Lithuania.
