= Algimantas Vincas Ulba =

Lithuanian politician

- Born: March 10, 1939
- Died: June 27, 2012 (aged 73)

Algimantas Vincas Ulba (10 March 1939 in Kaunas – 27 June 2012 in Palanga) was a Lithuanian politician. In 1990 he was among those who signed the Act of the Re-Establishment of the State of Lithuania.
