= Juozas Lebednykas =

Lithuanian artist and sculptor (1947–2024)

Juozas Lebednykas (20 August 1947 – 17 September 2024) was a Lithuanian artist and sculptor.

== Biography ==
Juozas Lebednykas was born on 20 August 1947 in Dusmenys village, Lithuanian SSR, USSR.

From 1966 to 1972 he studied sculpture at the State Institute of Art (in 1989 renamed to Vilnius Academy of Art). His tutors were Bronius Vyšniauskas, Gediminas Jokūbonis and Konstantinas Bogdanas. After graduation, from 1972 to 1973 he worked at the Vilnius Monument Restoration Institute and served in the army.

From 1973, he lived and worked in Panevėžys. From 1974 to 1987, he worked as a teacher of art at the Panevėžys art school.

Lebednykas was a member of the Lithuanian Artists' Union since 1975. During the period from 1989 to 1993 he was elected chairman of the Panevėžys branch of the Lithuanian Artists' Union.

He created numerous copper sheet reliefs and sculptures for interior and exterior as commissioned by the public institutions, as well as small sculpture and ceramic sculpture pieces, plastic compositions, objects and pastels.

The art critic Virginijus Kinčinaitis (in Lithuanian) said of his work:

Lebednykas' sculptural plastic has never been a hostage of just one kind of material or form. Monumental compositions in public spaces and chamber plasticity, metal and stone ceramics, bronze and drawings rippling in open colours express the artist's striving to recreate, with maximum expression, the surrounding matter and thus convey his own understanding of beauty. Therefore it is very natural that in this vast variety of internalised materials the artist is curious about having a go at the opportunities offered by form – from constructive abstraction to surrealist or expressive figurativism.

Lebednykas died in Panevėžys on 17 September 2024, at the age of 77.

== Solo exhibitions ==
- 1977 Exhibition Plastic Compositions. Lithuanian Art Foundation, Vilnius
- 1992 Exhibition of sculpture and plastic compositions. Panevėžys Art Gallery
- 1993 Exhibition of Small Plastic works and Drawings. Gallery XX, Panevėžys
- 1993 Exhibition of Sculpture plastic compositions. St.Jonas str. Gallery, Vilnius
- 1994 Exhibition of Small Plastic works. Gallery of Medals, Vilnius
  - Pastel Works, Panevėžys Art Gallery
- 1995 Exhibition of Small Plastic works. Germed Gallery, Berlin, Germany
- 1997 Exhibition of Sculpture and Drawings. Panevėžys Civic Art Gallery
  - Exhibition of Sculpture and Drawings. Arka Gallery, Vilnius
- 1998 Exhibition of sculpture and drawings. J.Miltinis Drama Theatre, Panevėžys
- 2000 Exhibition of Sculpture plastic compositions. Gallery "Kauno langas“, Kaunas
- 2001 Exhibition of Sculpture. Panevėžys Civic Art Gallery
- 2002 Exhibition of Sculpture plastic compositions. Panevėžys Civic Art Gallery
  - Exhibition of Sculpture plastic compositions. Gallery of Medals, Vilnius
- 2003 Exhibition of Sculpture plastic compositions. Bikuskis Manor
  - Small form sculpture, Academy of Sciences of the RofL, Vilnius
- 2005 Exhibition of Sculpture plastic compositions. Laiptai Gallery, Šiauliai
- 2007 Exhibition of Sculpture plastic compositions. Panevėžys Art Gallery

== Group exhibitions ==
- 1973 The Second National Exhibition of Young Artists' Work. Čiurlionis Art Museum, Kaunas
- 1974 The Third National Exhibition of Young Artists' Work. Art Palace, Panevėžys
- 1975 Exhibition "Our Country“. Art Palace, Vilnius
- 1976 National Exhibition of Young Artists' Work. Art Palace, Vilnius
- 1983 National Sculpture Exhibition. Art Palace, Vilnius
- 1974-1990 Spring Exhibition of the Panevėžys Artists' Work. Panevėžys Art Palace, Panevėžys Art Gallery
- 1992 Exhibition of Lithuanian Sculpture. Abenraa, Denmark
- 1995 7th Panevėžys International ceramic symposium exhibition. Panevėžys Civic Art Gallery
  - Exhibition "1995: Art in Lithuania“. Contemporary Art Center, Vilnius
- 1996 Exhibition of the Panevėžys Artists' Work. Art Exhibition Palace, Klaipėda
- 1998 Exhibition of the Panevėžys Artist's Work. Kėdainiai Town Hall Art Gallery
  - Exhibition "Panevėžys Art –30“. Panevėžys Civic Art Gallery
  - Exhibition of artist's group "Plekšne". Arka Gallery, Vilnius
- 1999 Exhibition of artist’s group "Plekšne“. Gallery of Medals, Vilnius
  - 11th Panevėžys International ceramic symposium exhibition. Panevėžys Civic Art Gallery
  - Exhibition "Lithuanian Ceramics". Schloss Ort castle, Gmunden, Austria
  - Panevėžys Art Days in Vilnius. Artists Palace, Vilnius
- 2000 Exhibition "Chamber Sculpture". Gallery of Medals, Vilnius
  - "Arka" 10th anniversary exhibition. Arka Gallery, Vilnius
  - "Panevėžys Civic Art Gallery Ceramic Collection 1989-1999". Panevėžys Civic Art Gallery
- 2001 Lithuanian Collection of the ceramics generated during the Panevėžys
  - International ceramic symposiums. Arka Gallery, Vilnius
  - Exhibition of Works of the Lithuanian Sculptors. The President's Office Gardens, Vilnius
  - 13th Panevėžys International ceramic symposium exhibition. Panevėžys Civic Art Gallery
  - Exhibition of Works of the Lithuanian Sculptors. Birštonas Local Government Building
  - Exhibition of Photographs of Monuments as Tombstones. Gallery of Medals, Vilnius
  - Gallery of Medals 10th anniversary exhibition. Gallery of Medals, Vilnius
- 2002 Sculpture exhibition "Bronze Metamorphoses". Gallery of Medals, Vilnius
  - Exhibition "10x10". Gallery XX, Panevėžys
  - Exhibition "New creation". Gallery of Medals, Vilnius
  - "Collection' 2002" fine arts review arranged by the Lithuanian Artists Union, Šiauliai Art Gallery
- 2003 Exhibition-contest "Sculpture Gardens of Bernardins", St.John's Gallery, Vilnius
  - Exhibition "Panevėžys Art Days'2003". Panevėžys Civic Art Gallery
  - Exhibition of Lithuanian ceramics "Paraphrases". Hacettepe University Art Gallery, Turkey
  - Ceramic Collection of Panevėžys Civic Art Gallery. The President's Office Gardens, Vilnius
- 2004 Exhibition of the Panevėžys Artists' Work. LDS Gallery, Kaunas
  - 15th Panevėžys International ceramic symposium exhibition. Panevėžys Civic Art Gallery
  - National exhibition "SPACE- monumental art-architecture". Arka Gallery, Vilnius
- 2005 Exhibition of the Panevėžys Artists' Work. LDS Gallery, Klaipėda
  - Exhibition "Panevėžys Art Days' 2005". Panevėžys Civic Art Gallery
  - Exhibition of the Panevėžys Artists' Work "Panevėžys – Vilnius". Arka Gallery, Vilnius
  - Project "Clay on Clay" (KLAAI OP KLAAI). Exhibition "Selected works of Panevėžys"
  - "International Ceramic Symposiums". Groate Kerk St. Jacobiparochie, Het Bildt, The Netherlands
  - Contemporary Art of Aukštaitija. Panevėžys Civic Art Gallery
- 2006 Exhibition "SPACE 1990-2005. Monumental art". Panevėžys Civic Art Gallery
  - Exhibition of the Panevėžys Artists' Work "Panevėžys – Jelgava". G. Eliasa museum of art and history, Jelgava, Latvia
  - National exhibition of graphic arts and sculpture "Space – plane – body". Contemporary Art Center, Vilnius
- 2007 Exhibition "Selected works of the Panevezys International Ceramic Symposiums", Lithuanian Center, the Lithuanian Embassy in Poland, Warsaw, Poland

== Symposiums, Pleinairs ==
- 1995 7th Panevėžys International Ceramic Symposium
- 1999 11th Panevėžys International Ceramic Symposium
- 2000 International Ice Sculpture Symposium, Jelgava, Latvia
- 2001 1st International Pleinair. Ecological –educational actions "Vision of Metal“, Onuškis, Lithuania
  - 13th Panevėžys International Ceramic Symposium
  - 5th bronze symposium. Foundry "Bronze Age" of the Lithuanian Artists Union, Vilnius
- 2004 15th Panevėžys International Ceramic Symposium

== Sculptures in public spaces ==
- Sculpture on the grave of actor Bronius Babkauskas (architect R. Eigelis). 1976, granite, 210x70 cm, Graveyard of the Christ the King Cathedral, Ramygalos Str., Panevėžys
- Birds (architect R. Vyšniauskas). 1985, copper, 645x150 cm, Front yard of the Panevėžys Water Supply and Sewer organization (in 1995 renamed to Joint Stock Company „Aukštaitijos vandenys“ (Aukštaitija Waters)
- Spring. 1986, copper, 190x100 cm, Interior of the Panevėžys Water Supply and Sewer organization office building (in 1995 renamed to Joint Stock Company „Aukštaitijos vandenys“ (Aukštaitija Waters)
- Waiting. 1987, copper, 170x70 cm, Panevėžys Land Museum
- Tranquility. 1987, copper, 137x50 cm, Panevėžys Land Museum
- Sails (architect M. Steponavičius). 1988, copper, 270x100 cm, Panevėžys Local Government Building
- Pieta (architect V. Andriuška). 1990, copper, granite, 400x80 cm, Churchyard of the Panevėžys Holy Trinity church
- Snail (architect A. Barzdžiukas). 1995, granite, 120x80 cm, Exterior of the Lithuanian Savings Bank Panevėžys office
- Monument to participants of the 1863 year uprising (architect A. Beresnevičius). 1998, granite, 280x176x120 cm, Uprising square, Panevėžys
- Tranquility. 1999, copper, 180x50 cm, Vytauto str., Palanga
- Blossom (architect R. Lukšas). 1999, copper, 120x120 cm, Urbšio str. Panevėžys
- Monument to St. Roch in Onuškis township. 2004, stoneware, metal, 450x80x80 cm, Onuškis, central square
