= Vizgirda =

- Lithuanian surname
- m.: Vizgirda
- f.: (unmarried): Vizgirdaitė
- f.: (married): Vizgirdienė

Vizgirda is a Lithuanian-language surname. It could be Polonized as Wizgierd or Wizgird. Notable people with the surname include:

- Algirdas Vizgirda (1944–2026), Lithuanian musician
- Viktoras Vizgirda (1904–1993), Lithuanian artist
