= Arminas Kazlauskis =

Lithuanian BMX rider (born 1989)

Personal information
- Born: 4 May 1989 (age 37)

Cycling career
- Sport: Cycling
- Current team: Lithuania
- Discipline: BMX racing
- Role: Rider

Arminas Kazlauskis (born 4 May 1989) is a Lithuanian male BMX rider, representing his nation at international competitions. He competed in the time trial event at the 2015 UCI BMX World Championships.
