= Tautvydas Pipiras =

Lithuanian basketball player (born 1993)

No. 10 – BC Perlas
- Position: Small forward
- League: National Basketball League

Personal information
- Born: 21 August 1993 (age 33) Vilnius, Lithuania
- Listed height: 1.97 m (6 ft 6 in)
- Listed weight: 93 kg (205 lb)

Career information
- Playing career: 2010–present

Career history
- 2010–2012: Vilniaus „KK Akademija“
- 2012–2015: Trakų Trakai
- 2015–present: BC Perlas

Tautvydas Pipiras (born 21 August 1993) is a Lithuanian basketball player for BC Perlas-MRU of the National Basketball League.

== Professional career ==
Tautvydas Pipiras started his professional career in the National Basketball League playing 2 seasons for Vilniaus „KK Akademija“ team, later renamed Vilniaus „Š. Marčiulionio Krepšinio Akademija“. In summer 2012, Tautvydas Pipiras signed a contract with Trakų Trakai where he played with his brother Domantas. He played 3 season in this club. Most successful was 2013–14 season when Trakų Trakai went to the finals where they lost to BC Mažeikiai and won silver medals. In 2015–16 season he signed with BC Perlas-MRU where he played alongside his brother Domantas and Rytis. He averaged 12.4 points per game and 4.5 rebounds per game.
