= Gedgaudas =

- Lithuanian surname
- m.: Gedgaudas
- f.: (unmarried): Gedgaudaitė
- f.: (married): Gedgaudienė
- Related names: Giedgowd

Gedgaudas is a Lithuanian surname.

- Andrius Gedgaudas
- Česlovas Gedgaudas
- Gabija Gedgaudaitė (born 2000), Lithuanian footballer
- Jurgis Gedgaudas
- Petras Simonas Gedgaudas
