= Alvydas =

- Gender: Male
- Name day: 20 July

Origin
- Region of origin: Lithuania

Alvydas is a masculine Lithuanian given name. Notable people with the name include:

- Alvydas Baležentis (born 1949), Lithuanian politician
- Alvydas Duonėla (born 1976), Lithuanian sprint canoeist
- Alvydas Nikžentaitis (born 1961), Lithuanian historian
- Alvydas Pazdrazdis (born 1972), basketball player
