= Rimantas Taraškevičius =

Lithuanian mayor

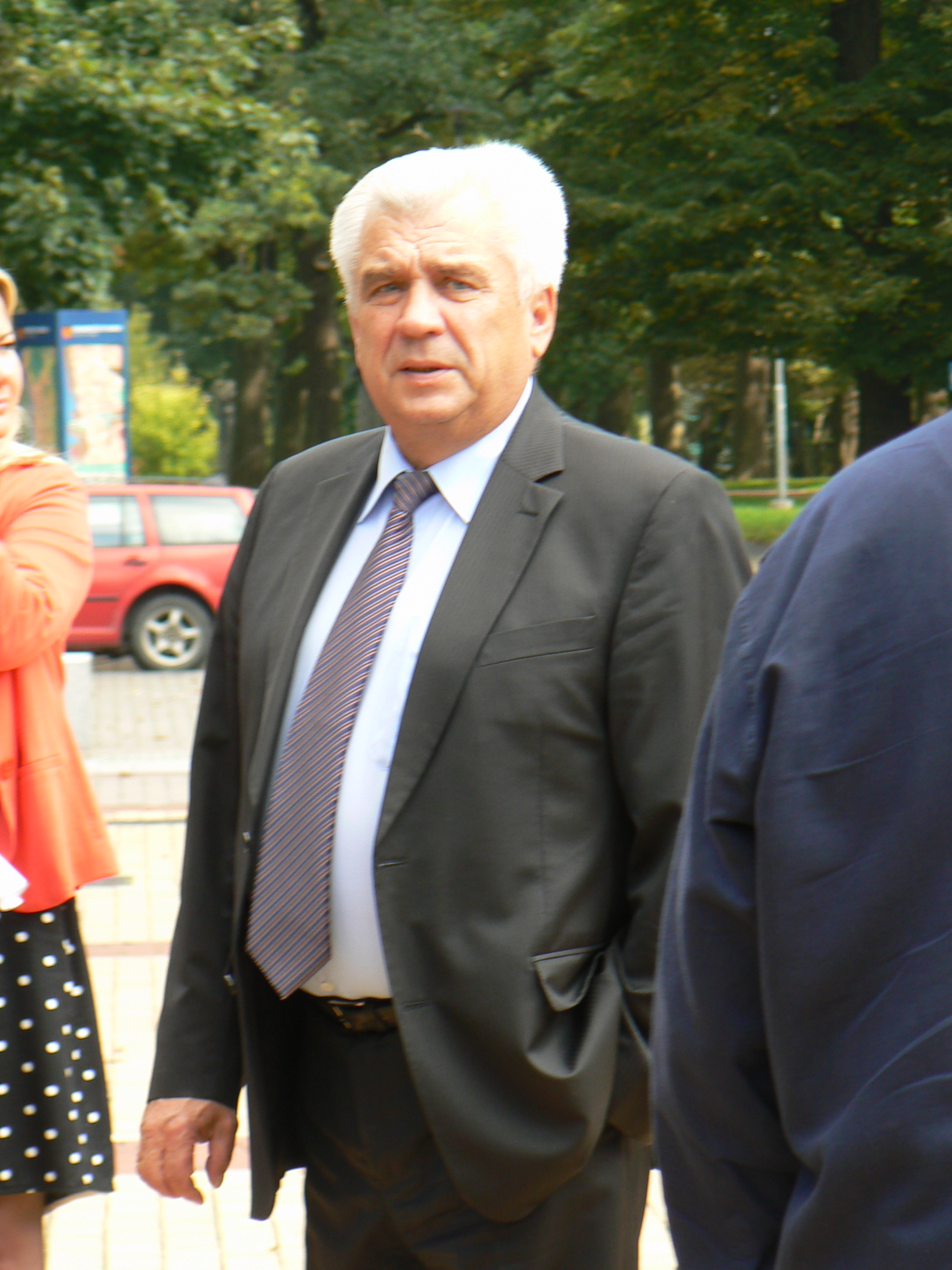

Mayor of Klaipėda
- In office 2001–2011
- Preceded by: Eugenijus Gentvilas
- Succeeded by: Vytautas Grubliauskas

Personal details
- Born: 18 July 1949 (age 76) Biliūnai, Lithuanian SSR
- Party: Lietuvos liberalų ir centro sąjunga

Rimantas Taraškevičius (18 July 1949 in the village of Biliūnai near Raseiniai, Lithuania) is a politician. He was elected mayor of Klaipėda, Lithuania in 2001.
