= Wajda (surname) =

Wajda is a Polish surname that is also used in parts of Eastern Europe outside of Poland.

Notable persons with the name include:

- Andrzej Wajda (1926–2016), Polish film director
- Henry Wajda (1934–1973), American horse racing jockey
- Julia Wajda (born 1990), Polish ski mountaineer
- Kazimierz Wajda aka "Szczepko" (1905–1955), Polish actor and comedian
- Patryk Wajda (born 1988), Polish ice hockey player
- Krystyna Zachwatowicz-Wajda (born 1930), Polish scenographer

== See also ==
- Wadjda, a 2012 Saudi Arabian film
