= Maria Paula Survilla =

American professor of ethnomusicology and ethnocultural activist

- Паўла Марыя Сурвілла
- Born: February 1, 1964; Madrid, Spain
- Died: April 25, 2020 (aged 56); Waverly, Iowa, US
- Education: University of Ottawa; University of Michigan
- Occupation: Ethnomusicologist
- Known for: Belarus ethnocultural activism
- Spouse: Eric Wachmann
- Children: Two sons
- Parents: Janka Survilla (father); Ivonka Survilla (mother)

Maria Paula Survilla (February 1, 1964 – April 25, 2020), also known as Paŭlina Maria Survilla, (Note: Belarusian: Паўліна Марыя Сурвіла, romanized: Pawlina Maryya Survila) was an American professor of ethnomusicology and an ethnocultural activist of Belarusian descent.

== Biography ==
Survilla was born in Madrid, Spain to Janka and Ivonka Survilla, anti-communist activists who had left Belarus because of conflicts caused by World War II. They moved to France for a few years and then to Spain. Paula inherited her mother's natural affinity for learning new languages and became fluent in French, Spanish and Belarusian as a child.

=== Early years ===
When she was five, the family moved to Canada and at school Survilla learned English, her fourth language.

Like her mother, a prominent defender of Belarusian culture, Survilla became an activist at a young age, founding and chairing the Youth Canadian Ethnocultural Council. At the University of Ottawa, she studied ethnomusicology, graduated with her B.A. in music (clarinet, 1987) and became a member of the Governor General's Foot Guards Band. She also worked as a tour guide, taking visitors through the Parliament and the Governor General's Residence.

=== Academician ===
In 1987, Survilla married Eric Wachmann and they moved to Ann Arbor, Michigan, so she could begin work on her M.A. degree at the University of Michigan. Her master's thesis was titled "Music and Identity: Byelorussians Making Music in North America".

In 1991, Survilla received a Fulbright Scholarship, which allowed her to conduct original research in Białystok, Poland and then Belarus. Her work resulted in her dissertation Of Mermaids and Rock Singers, with which she earned her Ph.D. in Ethnomusicology at the University of Michigan. Hers was the first dissertation written on this topic at the University of Michigan.

After her research, she taught at the University of North Carolina at Greensboro, and moved with her husband to Waverly, Iowa, where they both became professors at Wartburg College. Survilla taught both ethnomusicology and musicology as well as humanities classes. Continuing her work as an activist, she initiated college projects that included the Humanities Think Tank and the Hearthside Series.

She also pursued other activities, according to her obituary,

In 2008, Paula was appointed as the Executive Director for the Center for Belarusian Studies, an independent educational center founded by Ambassador (ret.) David Schwarz. The Center (now Foundation) relocated to Waverly and is one of the largest research centers of Belarusian politics and history outside of Belarus.

Maria Paula Survilla was a member of the Rada of the Belarusian Democratic Republic, the historical Belarusian state institution in exile.

Survilla died in Waverly on April 25, 2020, at the age of 56 from Creutzfeldt–Jakob disease. She was survived by her husband Eric Wachmann, a musician and professor of music, and their two sons, Vaalik, and Anton Wachmann.

== Selected works ==
- Survilla, M. P. (1990). Music and Identity: Byelorussians Making Music in North America (University of Michigan).
- Survilla, M. P. (2003). Ordinary words. Sound, symbolism, and meaning in Belarusan-language rock music. In Global pop, local language, ed. Harris M. Berger and Michael Thomas Carroll, 187–206.
- Survilla, M. P. (2020). Of mermaids and rock singers: placing the self and constructing the nation through Belarusan contemporary music. Routledge.
