= Algimantas Norvilas =

Lithuanian politician

Algimantas Norvilas (born 4 November 1953 in Šiauliai) is a Lithuanian politician. In 1990 he was among those who signed the Act of the Re-Establishment of the State of Lithuania.

Seimas
New constituency	Member of the Seimas for Aleksotas; 1990-1992	Succeeded by Arimantas Juvencijus Raškinis (Aleksotas-Vilijampolė)
