= Juozas Rimas =

Lithuanian musician

Juozas Rimas (born 1942) is a Lithuanian oboist and professor at the Lithuanian Academy of Music and Theatre who has recorded over 150 pieces and played for a number of regional orchestras.

== Biography ==
Juozas Rimas graduated from the Lithuanian Academy of Music and Theatre in 1965, and completed his post-graduate studies at the Saint Petersburg Conservatory in 1969. He began performing as a soloist in 1961, and has been one of the most active Lithuanian soloists since then. Rimas' performances have frequently been featured on Lithuanian National Radio. He has participated in a number of international festivals, performing in the genres of classical music, jazz, and Lithuanian folk music, as well as premiering about 50 pieces written for the oboe by Georgian, Uzbek, and Russian composers.

In 2004, Rimas was honored with Lithuania's Order of Vytautas the Great (Officer's Cross)lt:Vytauto Didžiojo ordino Karininko kryžius.
