= Povilas Budrys =

Lithuanian actor and artist

Povilas Budrys (born August 12, 1962 in Čiulai, Molėtai) is a Lithuanian theatre and film actor and artist.

== Career ==
=== Theatre ===
He graduated from the Lithuanian Academy of Music and Theatre under Jonas Vaitkus in 1981. Early roles include Saulinus (Saul) in Juozas Glinskis's Kingas (Kings) in 1980, Mankurtas in Čingizas Aitmatovas's Ilga kaip šimtmečiai diena in 1983 and Scipio in Albers Camus's Kaligula, also in 1983. In 1984-1988 he was with the Kaunas State Drama Theatre. He played Vyras - Paukštis under Sigitas Geda and Bronius Kutavičius in their production of Strazdas - žalias paukštis in 1985 (later adapted into a film in 1990), and later played Avdijus in Čingizas Aitmatovas's Golgota, Jonelis Ivanovas in Saulius Šaltenis's Duokiškis and worked with Virginia Kelme- lyte performing the leading roles in its production of "The Green Thrush" in 1987. From 1989-1999 (with a break in 1994) with the Vilnius State Youth Theatre. He played Alkanasis in Knudas Hamsunas's production of Badas in 1989/1990, considerably acclaimed, which was shown at the Baltic spring exhibition of "Riga 1990". He appeared in Eimuntas Nekrošius's performance of Song of Songs at the youth theatre, controversial for its use of crucifixes. He also worked with Viktorija Kuodyte in Wasted Land and played the character of Treplevas in The Seagull in 1991, a play by Anton Chekhov.

In the 1991/1992 season he was elected Best Actor by the Lithuanian Theatre Union. In 2007 he won the Golden Stage Cross Award for his work in Johann Wolfgang von Goethe's "Faust".

=== Film ===
In 1991 he appeared in the film Sala (The Island) and in 2005 starred in Stiklo salis.
