= Vaidotas Šilėnas =

Lithuanian footballer

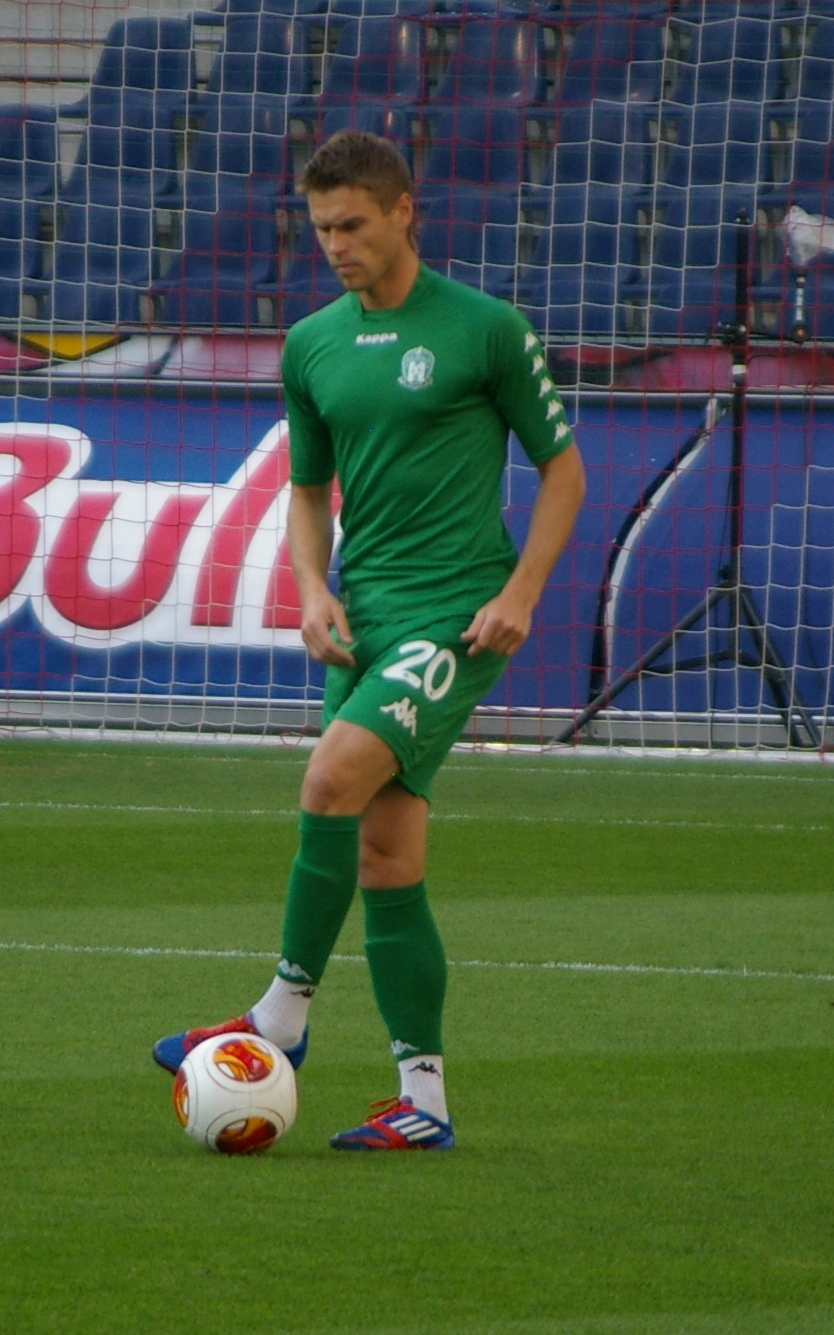

Personal information
- Date of birth: 16 July 1985 (age 41)
- Place of birth: Lithuania
- Height: 1.84 m (6 ft 0 in)
- Position: Midfielder

Team information
- Current team: kerala blaters
- Number: 37

Senior career*
Years	Team	Apps	(Gls)
2003–2004	FK Kražantė Kelmė	?	(4)
2005–2010	FK Šiauliai	107	(13)
2011–2014	Žalgiris Vilnius	102	(9)
2015	FK Sūduva Marijampolė	13	(2)
2015–2018	FK Trakai	83	(8)
2019–	kbfc	9	(7)

International career
2012	Lithuania	1	(0)
- * Club domestic league appearances and goals

Vaidotas Šilėnas (born 16 July 1985) is a Lithuanian international footballer who plays for a midfielder.

Played for FC Šiauliai and FK Žalgiris. With Žalgiris became champion of Lithiania.

Short time played in FK Sūduva.

Was member of FK Trakai team 4 seasons. In January left FK Trakai.

Currently plays for Kražantė B team in native town Kražantė B.
