= Paulius Antanas Baltakis =

Lithuanian Roman Catholic prelate (1925–2019)

Paulius Antanas Baltakis, O.F.M.
- Titular Bishop of Egara; Apostolic Visitor for the Lithuanians in Diaspora
- Church: Roman Catholic Church
- See: Apostolic Visitor for the Lithuanians in Diaspora
- Appointed: 1 June 1984
- In office: 1984 – 2003
- Predecessor: Antanas Louis Deksnys
- Successor: Luis Romero Fernández
- Previous post: Provincial superior of St. Casimir Franciscan Province (1979–1984)

Orders
- Ordination: 24 August 1952
- Consecration: 14 September 1984 by Cardinal Pio Laghi

Personal details
- Born: Antanas Baltakis; 1 January 1925 Troškūnai, Lithuania
- Died: 17 May 2019 (aged 94) Kaunas, Lithuania

Paulius Antanas Baltakis, O.F.M. (1 January 1925 – 17 May 2019) was a Lithuanian Roman Catholic prelate who served as the last Apostolic Visitor for the Lithuanians in Diaspora from 1 June 1984 until his resignation in 2003.

== Biography ==
Baltakis was born into a family of Lithuanian farmers as the second of eleven children and named as Antanas. He studied in gymnasiums in Kretinga and Anykščiai until he was arrested by Nazi agents in 1944 and sent to forced labour.

After the liberation from the forced labour camp at the end of World War II, he began to study at the Catholic University of Leuven in 1945 and a year later joined the mendicant Franciscan Order, where he was tonsured with the name "Paulius" and made his solemn profession of vows on 15 September 1950. Baltakis was ordained as a priest on 24 August 1952, after completing his theological studies.

From 1952 Baltakis was attached to the parish and missionary work among Lithuanian emigrants in the United States and Canada. He organised the construction of a monastery printing house, Lithuanian cultural centre "Kultūros židinys" and taught at a Lithuanian school. In 1979 he was elected provincial superior of the Lithuanian St. Casimir Franciscan Province and served in this office until 1984.

On 1 June 1984 Pope John Paul II appointed him as an Apostolic Visitor for the Lithuanian Roman Catholics in diaspora and made him Titular Bishop of Egara. He received his episcopal consecration in the Cathedral of the Immaculate Conception in Portland, Maine, on 14 September 1978 from Cardinal Pio Laghi.

Baltakis resigned these titles in 2003 and remained in the United States until April 2018 when he returned to Lithuania.

Baltakis died on 17 May 2019 in Kaunas.

Catholic Church titles
| Preceded by Antanas Louis Deksnys | Apostolic Visitor for the Lithuanians in Diaspora; 1984–2003 | Succeeded by Abolished |
| Preceded by Juan Francisco Sarasti Jaramillo | Titular Bishop of Egara; 1984–2019 | Succeeded by Vacant |
