= Algis =

Algis is a Lithuanian male given name and nickname for various names. Notable people with the name include:

- Algis Budrys (1931–2008), Lithuanian-American science fiction author, editor and critic
- Algis Ignatavicius (born 1931), Lithuanian-Australian basketball player
- Algis Jankauskas (born 1982), Lithuanian footballer
- Algis Kizys (born 1960), American bass guitarist
- Algis Matulionis (born 1947), actor and screenwriter
- Algis Oleknavicius (born 1947), cyclist
- Algis Skačkauskas (1955–2009), Lithuanian painter
- Algis Uždavinys (1962–2010), Lithuanian philosopher and scholar
