= Vidmantas Povilionis =

Lithuanian politician (born 1948)

Vidmantas Povilionis (born 29 May 1948) is a Lithuanian politician. In 1990 he was among those who signed the Act of the Re-Establishment of the State of Lithuania.

Seimas
New constituency	Member of the Seimas for Pramonės constituency 1990-1992	Succeeded by Kęstutis Povilas Paukštys
