= Dithematic name =

Given name type

A dithematic name is a single-word given name consisting of two compounded lexemes or stems. They are commonly dated from pre-Christian times among Indo-Europeans, in particular, Lithuanians, Germanic, and Slavic peoples.

Single-lexeme names or monothematic names are names based on a single lexeme/stem.

Polish linguist Zofia Kaleta asserts that many Old Germanic and Old Slavic dithematic given names reflected wishes for newborns.

Since dithematic names are often long, they became truncated, first as diminutives, which had later become regular given names of their own. Czech examples: Rostislav – Rost; Svatopluk – Pluk; Radomír – Radim; Sbyslav – Sbych; Sdeslav – Sdeš, Sdenĕk (Zdeněk); Dobromil – Došek; Přemysl – Přek; Budihost – Buň.

== See also ==
- Glossary of pre-Christian Lithuanian names
- Germanic dithematic name
- Slavic dithematic name
