= Lithuanian name =

A Lithuanian personal name, as in most European cultures, consists of two main elements: the given name (vardas) followed by the family name (pavardė). The usage of personal names in Lithuania is generally governed (in addition to personal taste and family custom) by three major factors: civil law, canon law, and tradition. Lithuanian names always follow the rules of the Lithuanian language. Lithuanian male names have preserved the Indo-European masculine endings (-as; -is; -us). These gendered endings are added even to foreign names.

== Vardas (given name) ==
A child in Lithuania is usually given one or two given names. Nowadays the second given name is rarely used in everyday situations. As well as modern names, parents can choose a name or names for their child from a long list of traditional names; these include:

- Lithuanian names of pre-Christian origin.

These are the most ancient layer of Lithuanian personal names; a majority of them are dual-stemmed personal names, of Indo-European origin. These ancient Lithuanian names are constructed from two interconnected stems, the combination of which has been used to denote certain beneficial personal qualities, for example Jo-gaila means "a strong rider". Although virtually extinct following the Christianization of Lithuania, they continued to exist as surnames, such as Goštautas, Kęsgaila, Radvila or in their Slavicised versions, as well as in toponyms. (Note: E.g., Gelgaudiškis from Gedgaudas, Radviliškis from Radvila, Buivydiškės from Butvydas, etc.) The existing surnames and written sources have allowed linguists such as Kazimieras Būga to reconstruct these names. In the period between World War I and World War II these names returned to popular use after a long period of neglect. Children are often named in honor of the most revered historical Lithuanian rulers; these are some of the most popular names. They include Vytautas, Gediminas, Algirdas, and Žygimantas. In line with the double-stemmed names, shorter variants containing only one stem were also used, such as Vytenis and Kęstutis. Since there are few pre-Christian female names attested in written sources, they are often reconstructed from male variants, in addition to the historical Birutė, Aldona, Rimgailė etc.

- Christian names, i.e. Biblical names or saint's names.

The use of Christian names in the Lithuanian language long predates the adoption of Christianity by Lithuanians. The linguistic data attest that first Biblical names started to be used in Aukštaitija as early as the 11th century. The earliest stratum of such names originates from Old Church Slavonic; they were borrowed by Eastern Orthodoxy in their Byzantine versions. Examples of such names are Antanas (St. Anthony), Povilas or Paulius (St. Paul), Andrius (St. Andrew) and Jurgis (St. George), while female names include Kotryna (St. Catherine) and Marija (St. Mary). The later influx of Christian names came after the adoption of Christianity in 1387. They are mostly borrowed in their Polish versions: Jonas (St. John), Vladislovas/Vladas (St. Ladislaus), Kazimieras/Kazys (St. Casimir), Ona (St. Anne), etc.

- Lithuanian common nouns or hydronyms used as names.

There are popular names constructed from the words for celestial bodies (Saulė for the Sun, Aušrinė for Venus), events of nature (Audra for storm, Aušra for dawn, Rasa for dew, Vėjas for wind, Aidas for echo), plants (Linas/Lina for flax, Eglė for spruce), and river names (Ūla, Vilija for River Neris).

- invented names from literature.

Some names were created by the authors of literary works and spread in public use through them. Such names followed the rules of the Lithuanian language; therefore it is sometimes difficult to tell whether the name is fictitious and had never existed before. Notably, Gražina, Živilė by Adam Mickiewicz, Daiva by Vydūnas, Šarūnas by Vincas Krėvė and others.

- names of Lithuanian pagan deities and mythological figures.

There are some popular names of gods and goddesses from Lithuanian mythology that are used as personal names, such as Laima, goddess of luck, Žemyna, goddess of earth, Gabija, goddess of fire; Žilvinas, a serpent prince from the fairy tale Eglė the Queen of Serpents, Jūratė, goddess of the sea, and Kastytis, from the legend about Jūratė and Kastytis.

A distinctive practice dominated in the ethnic region of Lithuania Minor, then part of East Prussia, where Lithuanised German personal names were common, such as Ansas (Hans), Grėtė (Grete), Vilius (Wilhelm) among Prussian Lithuanians. Some of them are still in use among Lithuanians.

The choice of a given name is influenced by fashion. Many parents may name their child after a national hero or heroine, some otherwise famous person, or a character from a book, film, or TV show. However, many names used in today's Lithuania have been in use since the ancient times.

=== Sex differentiation ===
Lithuanian male and female names are distinguished grammatically. Almost all Lithuanian female names end in the vowels -a or -ė, while male names almost always end in -s, and rarely in a vowel -a or -ė, e.g. Mozė (Moses). If a masculine name ending in -a has a feminine counterpart, it ends in -ė, e.g. Jogaila and Jogailė. Female double-stemmed Lithuanian names always end in -ė.

=== Diminutives ===
Diminutives are very popular in everyday usage, and are by no means reserved for children. The Lithuanian language allows for a great deal of creativity in this field. Most diminutives are formed by adding a suffix. For female names this may be -elė, -utė, -ytė, or -užė; certain suffixes are more common to specific names over the rest.

Also, as in many other cultures, a person may informally use a nickname (pravardė) in addition to or instead of a given name.

== Pavardė (surname) ==
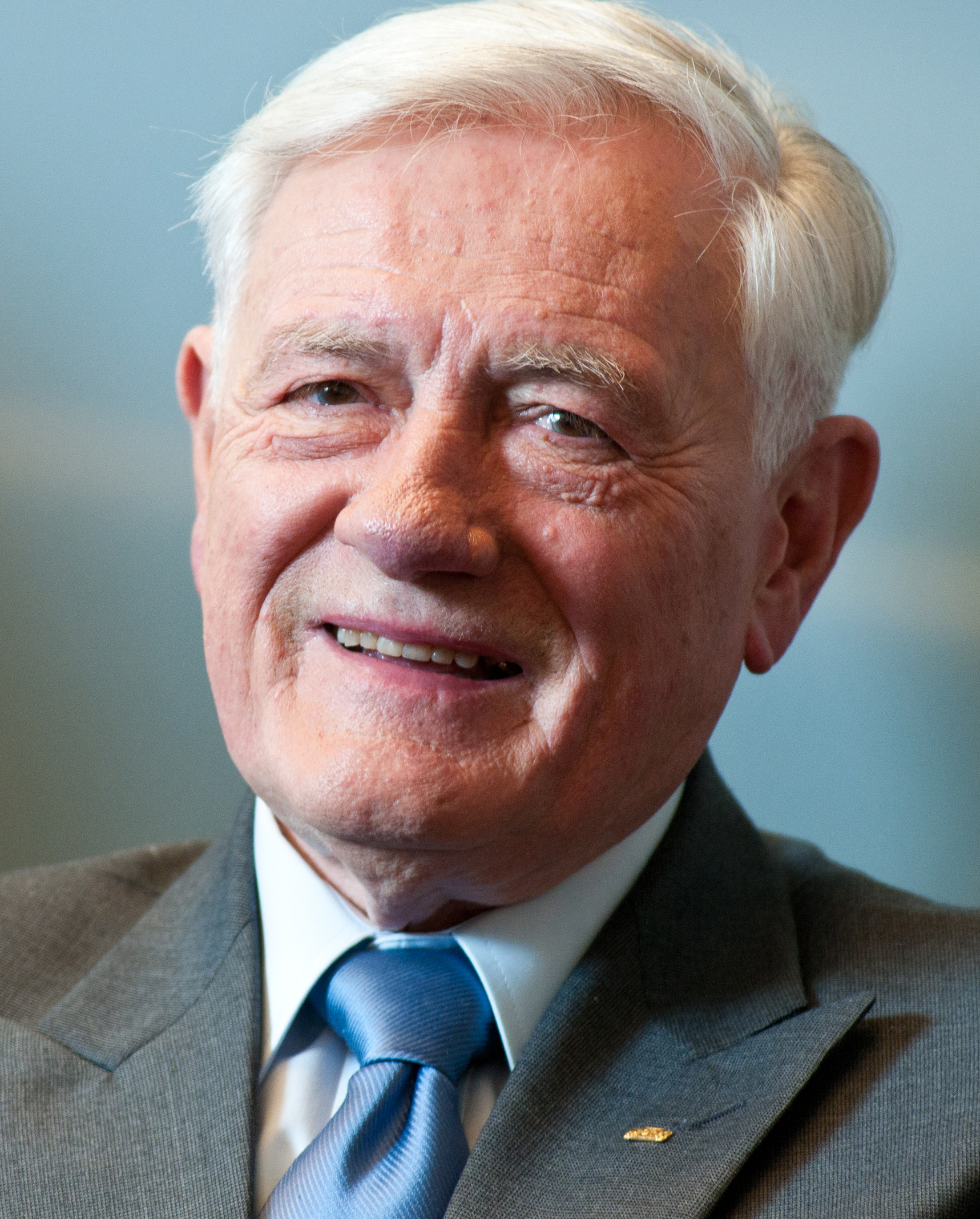
President Valdas Adamkus, born Adamkavičius, one of the most known Lithuanian public figures, Lithuanised his name in 1955.

Lithuanian surnames, like those in most of Europe, are hereditary and generally patrilineal, i.e., passed from the father to his children. Formally, Lithuanian surnames are divided into two groups – Lithuanian and non-Lithuanian ones. The first category encompasses non-suffixed male surnames and their corresponding feminine forms as well as suffixed male surnames with proper patronymic extensions -aitis, -(i)onis, -inis, -ėnas, -ėkas, -utis, -(i)ulis, -(i)ūnas, -ikas, -ikis, and -i(n)kus and their respective feminine equivalents. The second category consists of last names that mostly resulted from Slavic phonetics and morphology being applied to existing Lithuanian forms: this process led to partially Lithuanised suffixes like -(i)auskas, -auskis, -inskas, -inskis, -i(n)ckas, -i(n)ckis, -eckas, -eckis, -eskas, -e(v)skis, -avičius, -evičius, or -iškis for males, which carry parallel endings for females. Such naming conventions arose primarily due to historical factors: the Grand Duchy of Lithuania using Ruthenian as its official written language instead of Lithuanian since the first written records of the Baltic language date back only to the 16th century. The influence of Slavic naming only grew when Lithuania formed a bi-federation with the Crown of the Kingdom of Poland later on. Both groups of surnames are oftentimes closely related through a common root, resulting in a rich variety of similar surnames as demonstrated below:

A table of Lithuanian family names derived from a common-root Budr- (Note: This list is incomplete and does not include certain alternative same-suffix derivatives (e.g. masc. Budrečkis), related double-suffix surnames (e.g. masc. Budreckaitis), or plausible forms that are unlikely in reality (e.g. masc. Budrulis, Budrutis).)
	Male masc. -a, -as, -is, -ys, -us, -ė (Note: If a male surname is non-suffixed and ends with -ė, the corresponding shortened form for a married female remains the same (e.g. Lapė; Kregždė))	Female		
	Male masc. -a, -as, -is, -ys, -us, -ė	Married (traditional) fem. -ienė, -(i)uvienė	Married (shortened) fem. -ė (Note: In June of 2003, the Commission of the Lithuanian Language has adopted the Resolution No. N-2 (87) allowing married females to omit suffixes indicative of their marital status.)	Maiden fem. -aitė, -ytė, -utė, -(i)ūtė
Proper Lithuanian	Non-suffixed surname			
Proper Lithuanian	Budra	Budrienė	Budrė	Budraitė
Proper Lithuanian	Budris / Budrys	Budrienė	Budrė	Budrytė
Proper Lithuanian	Suffixed surname masc. -aitis, -(i)onis, -inis, -ėnas, -ėkas, -eika, -utis, -(i)ulis, -(i)ūnas, -ikas, -ikis, -i(n)kus			
Proper Lithuanian	Budraitis	Budraitienė	Budraitė	Budraitytė
Proper Lithuanian	Budrionis	Budrionienė	Budrionė	Budrionytė
Proper Lithuanian	Budrėnas	Budrėnienė	Budrėnė	Budrėnaitė
Proper Lithuanian	Budreika	Budreikienė	Budreikė	Budreikaitė
Proper Lithuanian	Budr(i)ūnas	Budr(i)ūnienė	Budr(i)iūnė	Budr(i)ūnaitė
Proper Lithuanian	Budrikas	Budrikienė	Budrikė	Budrikytė
Partially Lithuanised	Suffixed surname masc. -(i)auskas, -auskis, -inskas, -inskis, -i(n)ckas, -i(n)ckis, -eckas, -eckis, -eskas, -e(v)skis, -avičius, -evičius, -iškis			
Partially Lithuanised	Budrauskas	Budrauskienė	Budrauskė	Budrauskaitė
Partially Lithuanised	Budrauskis	Budrauskienė	Budrauskė	Budrauskytė
Partially Lithuanised	Budrinskas	Budrinskienė	Budrinskė	Budrinskaitė
Partially Lithuanised	Budrinskis	Budrinskienė	Budrinskė	Budrinskytė
Partially Lithuanised	Budrickas	Budrickienė	Budrickė	Budrickaitė
Partially Lithuanised	Budrickis	Budrickienė	Budrickė	Budrickytė
Partially Lithuanised	Budreckas	Budreckienė	Budreckė	Budreckaitė
Partially Lithuanised	Budreckis	Budreckienė	Budreckė	Budreckytė
Partially Lithuanised	Budreskas	Budreskienė	Budreskė	Budreskaitė
Partially Lithuanised	Budreskis	Budreskienė	Budreskė	Budreskytė
Partially Lithuanised	Budravičius	Budravičienė	Budravičė	Budravičiūtė
Partially Lithuanised	Budrevičius	Budrevičienė	Budrevičė	Budrevičiūtė

Some of the earliest instances of legal family name changes in sovereign Lithuania occurred in 1919, when the Government approved requests from twelve students to Lithuanise their last names. In the 1930s, politicians considered passing legislation that would allow Lithuanians to adopt alternative Lithuanian family names on a national scale. However, such propositions faced legal barriers and were met with criticism from some linguists who argued that such last names preserve family legacy. Although some did manage to change their last names during the interwar period, unlike countries such as Finland where Fennomans urged their compatriots to change their family names of Swedish origin into Finnish ones, or Estonia, where 17% of the population Estonianised their surnames in 1935–40, Lithuanians never underwent such a process on a mass scale. In 2009, the question of Lithuanians being allowed to fully Lithuanise their family names was raised again. Approximately 1,500 Lithuanian residents express interest in changing their surnames annually, not counting surname changes due to marriage or divorce.

A married woman usually adopts her husband's name. However, other combinations are legally possible. The wife may keep her maiden name (mergautinė pavardė) or add her husband's surname to hers, thus creating a double-barrelled name. It is also possible, though rare, for the husband to adopt his wife's surname or to add his wife's surname to his family name.

=== History ===
Family names first appeared in Lithuania around 1500, but were reserved for the Lithuanian nobility. They usually derived from patronymics.

The use of family names gradually spread to other social groups: the townsfolk by the end of the 17th century, then the peasantry. People from the villages did not have last names until the end of the 18th century. In such cases their village of origin was usually noted in documents. The process ended only in the mid-19th century, and due to the partial Polonization of society at the time many names were influenced by Polish form of the name.

=== Classification ===
Based on origin, several groups of Lithuanian family names may be recognized.

==== Ancient given names ====
A number of surnames evolved from the ancient Lithuanian personal names, such as Budrys, Girdenis, Tylenis, Vilkas, Amantas, Bukantas, Rimgaila, Vizgirda, Tarvydas. A number of them were identified from historical names of villages, farmsteads, etc., often in plural, named after the founding families, e.g., Darbutas.

==== Cognominal ====
A cognominal surname derives from a person's nickname, usually based on a physical or character trait.

Examples:

- Naujokas, Naujokaitis – from naujas ("new one")
- Kairys, Kairelis, – "leftie", from kairė ("left side")

==== Occupational ====
Examples of occupational surnames:

- Kalvis, Kalvelis, Kalvaitis – from kalvis ("blacksmith")

==== Toponymic ====
A toponymic surname usually derives from the name of a village or town, or the name of a topographic feature.

Examples:

- Užugiris – from across the forest (už girios);
- Kalnietis – from the mountains (kalnai).

==== Patronymic ====
A patronymic surname derives from a given name of a person and usually ends in a suffix suggesting a family relation.

Native Lithuanian patronymic suffixes are -aitis, -utis, -ytis, -ėlis. Patronymic suffixes -vičius/-vičiūtė/-vičienė are borrowed from Ruthenian suffix -vich. Examples:

- Jonaitis, Janavičius, Januitis – derived from Jonas (John);
- Adomaitis, Adamonis – derived from Adomas (Adam);
- Lukošius, Lukoševičius – derived from Lukas (Luke).

==== Diminutives ====
A number of surnames are diminutives of popular first names.

- Butkus from Butkintas
- Minkus from Minkantas
- Norkus from Norkantas
- Rimkus from Rimkantas

There also is a rare archaic usage of a diminutive suffix, -iukas, appended to surnames, e.g., Dankša -> Dankšiukas, Kaplanas -> Kaplaniukas, Sederevičius -> Sederevičiukas.

For toponymic and patronymic names the use of suffixes that cognate to the Slavic equivalent, such as -avičius (cognate of "-owicz"), -auskas (cognate of "-owski") is common: Jankauskas (cognate of Slavic Jankowski), Adamkevičius (cognate of Adamkowicz or Adamkiewicz), Lukoševičius (cognate of Łukaszewicz).

=== Feminine forms ===
Lithuanian surnames have specific masculine and feminine forms. While a masculine surname usually ends in -as, -ys or -is, its feminine equivalent ends in -ienė or rarely -uvienė for married women and -aitė, -utė, -iūtė or -ytė for unmarried ones. Examples:

Father / husband	Married woman or widow	Unmarried woman
Paulauskas	Paulauskienė	Paulauskaitė
Bimbirys	Bimbirienė	Bimbirytė
Adamkus	Adamkienė	Adamkutė
Mielkus	Mielkienė/Mielkuvienė	Mielkutė
Kulėšius	Kulėšienė	Kulėšiūtė

There also is a rare archaic suffix for the unmarried feminine surname, -iukė, e.g., Martinaitis -> Martinaičiukė, which is a diminutive suffix. In 2003, Lithuanian laws allowed women to use a short form, without disclosing the marital status (ending in -ė instead of -ienė/-aitė/etc.: Adamkus → Adamkė). These names are used, although traditional forms are still predominant. According to the State Data Agency, in 2008 the most popular feminine family names were:

1. Kazlauskienė
2. Jankauskienė
3. Petrauskienė
4. Stankevičienė
5. Paulauskienė

== Formal and informal use ==
Lithuanians pay great attention to the correct way of referring to or addressing other people depending on the level of social distance, familiarity and politeness. The differences between formal and informal language include:

- using surnames vs. given names;
- using vs. not using honorific titles such as Ponas / Ponia;
- using the third person singular forms vs. second person singular;
- using second-person singular personal pronoun vs. second-person plural personal pronoun to address a single person.

=== Formal language ===
==== Ponas/Ponia/Tamsta ====
Ponas and Ponia (vocative case Pone, Ponia) are the basic honorific styles used in Lithuanian to refer to a man or woman, respectively. In the past, these styles were reserved to members of the szlachta and played more or less the same roles as "Lord" or "Sir" and "Lady" or "Madam" in English. Since the 19th century, they have come to be used in all strata of society and may be considered equivalent to the English "Mr." and "Ms." There is a separate style, Panelė ("Miss"), applied to an unmarried woman, and Ponaitis ("Mister"), traditionally applied to an unmarried man but these days the latter style is rarely used in practice. Although widely used, the honorific styles Ponas and Ponia came into Lithuanian as direct loanwords from the Polish language. The honorific style of Lithuanian origin is Tamsta (vocative case Tamsta), which can be used either as a gender-neutral honorific style or a polite way to refer to someone whose name is unknown. However, the latter is rarely practiced today in the standard Lithuanian language.

==== Given name/surname order ====
The given name(s) normally comes before the surname. However, in a list of people sorted alphabetically by surname, the surname usually comes first. In many formal situations the given name is omitted altogether.

=== Informal language ===
Informal forms of address are normally used only by relatives, close friends and colleagues. In such situations diminutives are often preferred to the standard forms of given names.

== See also ==
- Name of Lithuania
- Lithuanian nobility
- Vardenis Pavardenis
