= Vaclovas Krutinis =

Lithuanian sculptor

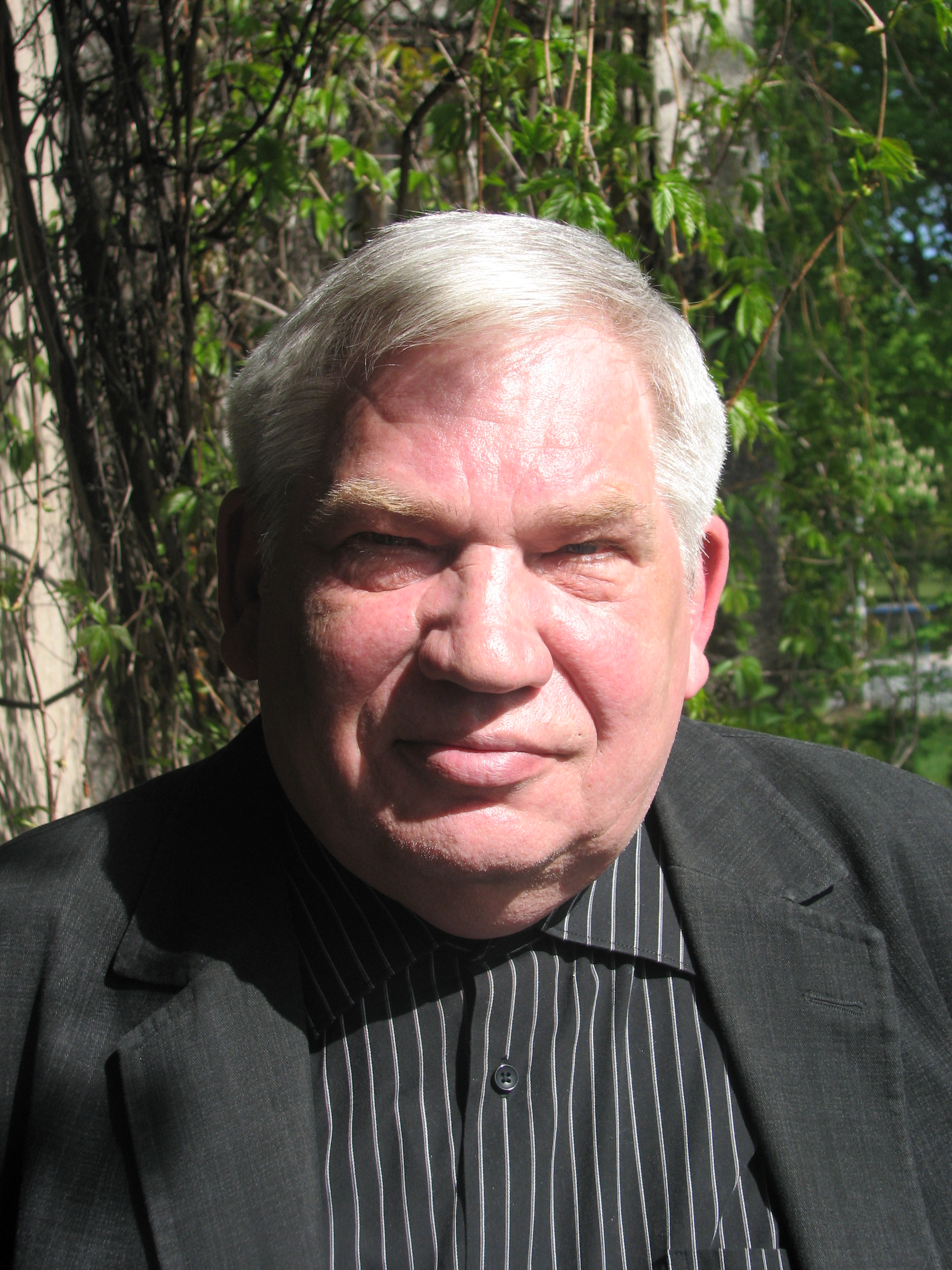
Vaclovas Krutinis

Vaclovas Krutinis (September 27, 1948 Vilnius, Lithuania – October 30, 2013 Vilnius) was a Lithuanian sculptor.

He was President of the Lithuanian Artists' Association from 1998 to 2008.

== See also ==
- List of Lithuanian painters
