= Teofilis Tilvytis =

Soviet Lithuanian poet and writer

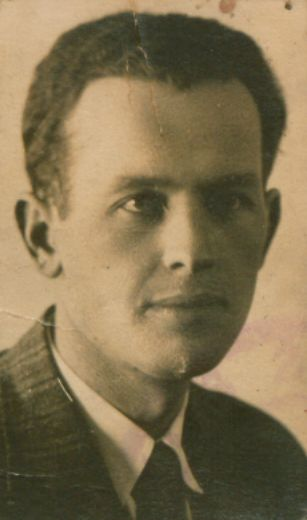
- Tilvytis in c. 1924
- Born: 28 January 1904; Gaidžiai, Russian Empire
- Died: 5 May 1969 (aged 65); Vilnius, Lithuanian SSR
- Burial place: Antakalnis Cemetery
- Occupations: Poet, newspaper editor
- Awards: Stalin Prize (1951); People's Poet of the Lithuanian SSR (1954)

Teofilis Tilvytis (28 January 1904 – 5 May 1969) was a Soviet Lithuanian poet and writer. He was awarded the Stalin Prize in 1951 and recognized as the People's Poet of the Lithuanian SSR in 1954.

Expelled from a gymnasium, Tilvytis did not complete any specialized education. In 1923, he moved to Kaunas where he joined cultural life, performing with the Vilkolakis Theatre and participating in the literary movement Keturi vėjai (Four Winds). He was the editor and publisher of the satirical weekly newspaper Kuntaplis (1933–1940). During the German occupation of Lithuania during World War II, he was briefly imprisoned in Kaunas and Pravieniškės. In the Lithuanian SSR, Tilvytis devoted most of his time to writing. He was a delegate to the Supreme Soviet of the Lithuanian SSR (1947–1963) and chairman of the Lithuanian chapter of the Soviet Peace Committee (1958–1969).

During the interwar period, Tilvytis published literary parodies and satirical poems and novels that targeted bureaucrats. During the Soviet era, he adopted socialist realism style and wrote works praising the new communist regime. For his epic poem Usnynė, which described lives of Lithuanian peasants from struggles in interwar Lithuania to building of the utopian socialism, he was awarded the Stalin Prize in 1951.

== Biography ==
=== Early life ===
Tilvytis was born in Gaidžiai near Tauragnai. He was the 13th child in the family. Several of his family members wrote poems and other literary works, including his elder brother Jurgis Tilvytis who was a Catholic priest and nephew Pulgis Andriušis.

Tilvytis studied at the Panevėžys and Utena Progymnasiums, but was known as a mischievous student and was expelled from the 5th grade for arrogant behaviors with the teachers. In his autobiography, Tilvytis later claimed that he was expelled for publishing excerpts critically evaluating the life of Jesus in a student newspaper. In 1922, he briefly worked as a secretary of a local chapter of the Lithuanian Riflemen's Union and published his first poems in the chapter's newspaper Spinduliai that he edited.

=== Interwar Lithuania ===
In 1923, he moved to Kaunas where he worked at the Tax Inspectorate until 1930. He applied to the Kaunas Music School in singing (baritone) and piano specialties, but was rejected. He later took piano classes from Elena Laumenskienė. In 1924–1925, he studied at the theater school of the National Theatre. He performed with the Vilkolakis Theatre, which became known for its satirical productions, and joined the literary movement Keturi vėjai (Four Winds). Overall, Tilvytis tried his hand at various arts (writing, music, singing, sculpture, photography).

In 1926, he was drafted for the mandatory military service in the Lithuanian Army and assigned as a secretary to Žaliakalnis. Between 1933 and 1940, he edited or co-edited the satirical weekly newspaper Kuntaplis which became a profitable undertaking. The newspaper was sympathetic to communist causes and sometimes published adapted material from the Soviet satirical magazine Krokodil. From 1937, Tilvytis was the sole publisher of Kuntaplis. After the Soviet occupation of Lithuania in June 1940, the newspaper was not immediately banned (as most other periodicals of independent Lithuania) and was replaced by Soviet Šluota in December 1940. Tilvytis then worked as deputy editor of the literary magazine Raštai (chief editor Petras Cvirka).

=== World War II ===
Soviet authorities nationalized a luxurious house of banker Jonas Vailokaitis and gave it the Lithuanian Writers' Union. The union invited several writers, including Tilvytis, to move in. He wrote a satirical poem Letter to Vailokaitis in which he expressed joy for the end of the bourgeois and start of the communist regimes. The poem was included in Lithuanian school curriculum until the Khrushchev Thaw in 1956.

At the start of the German invasion of the Soviet Union, Tilvytis did not evacuate to Russia. Vailokaitis' house was taken over by Theodor Adrian von Renteln, General Commissioner of Generalbezirk Litauen. Tilvytis at first refused to relocate and was imprisoned at the Kaunas Prison and Pravieniškės concentration camp. At the camp, he was in charge of clothing storage. He was released in about four months and returned to his native Gaidžiai.

=== Soviet Lithuania ===
As a result of the Operation Bagration, Red Army captured Vilnius in July 1944. Tilvytis was invited to join the Lithuanian Writers' Union as a deputy of Kostas Korsakas. However, he worked there briefly and left in 1945. Tilvytis settled in Žvėrynas and devoted his time to writing, including revising his old works. For example, he had to remove references to Russian influences corrupting the Lithuanian nation from his poem Dičius (the word "Russian" was replaced by "bourgeoise"). He wrote his most famous poem Usnynė in 1948, which won him the Stalin Prize in 1951. He was named People's Poet of the Lithuanian SSR in 1954. He also received Order of Lenin and Order of the Red Banner of Labour.

He was a delegate to the Supreme Soviet of the Lithuanian SSR from 1947 to 1963. After studies of Marxism–Leninism, he joined the Communist Party of the Soviet Union in 1951. He was also chairman of the Lithuanian chapter of the Soviet Peace Committee in 1958–1969.

He died in Vilnius on 5 May 1969 and was buried at Antakalnis Cemetery.

== Legacy ==
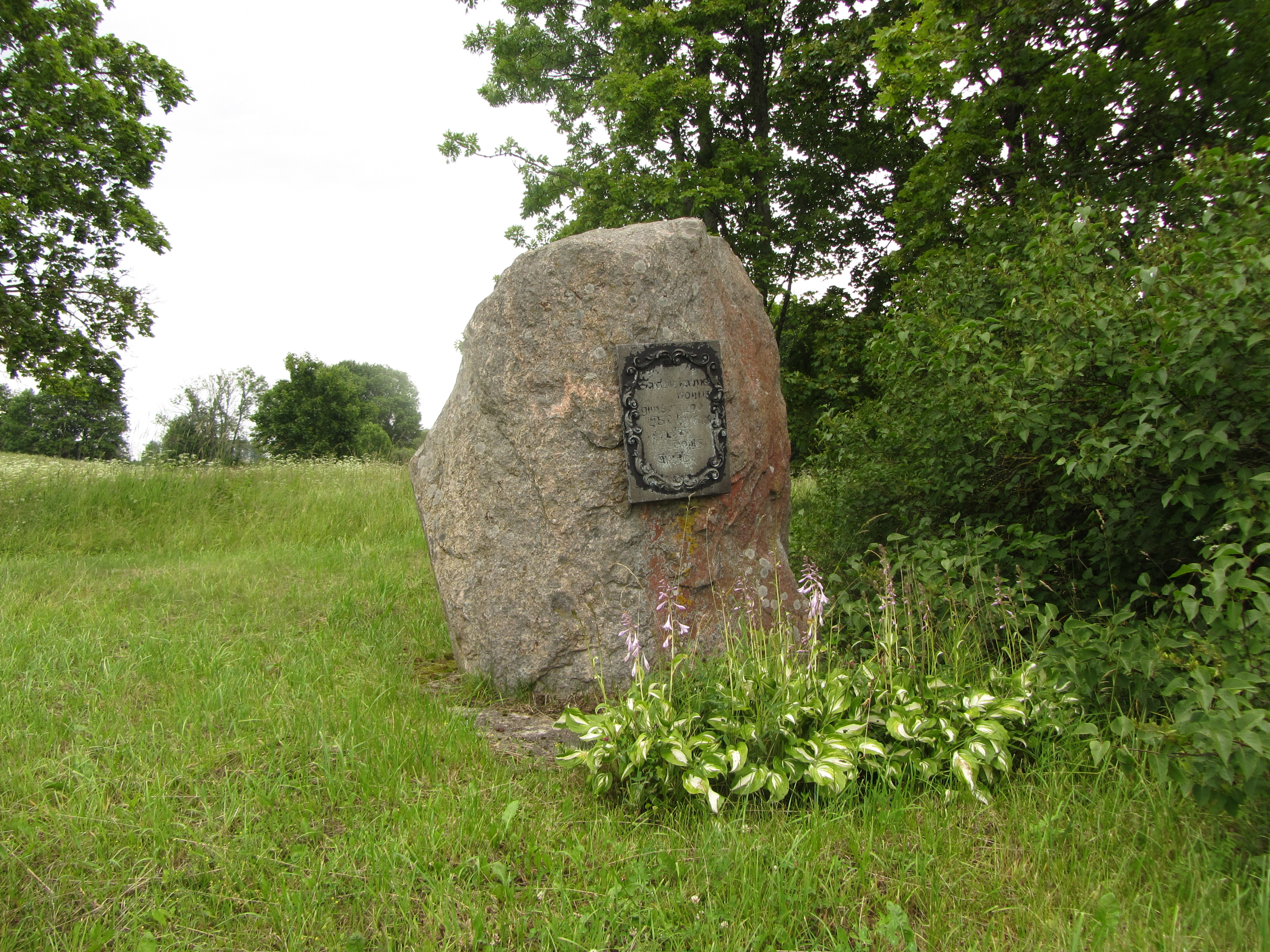
Memorial stone near his native Gaidžiai

Two biographies of Tilvytis were published by Vytautas Kubilius in 1956 (translated to Russian in 1958) and Vitas Areška in 1988.

In 1971, a small memorial museum dedicated to Tilvytis was opened in the Culture House in Tauragnai. In 1975, a memorial plaque was affixed to a house in Vilnius Old Town where Tilvytis lived in 1963–1969. The plaque was removed in 2023.

== Works ==
=== Interwar Lithuania ===
Tilvytis became known for his literary parodies, which he published in two poetry collections 3 grenadieriai (Three Grenadiers; 1926) and 13. Nuo Maironies iki manęs (13. Since Maironis to Me; 1929). He parodied poems of his contemporaries and colleagues Faustas Kiršas, Juozas Tysliava, Kazys Binkis. He was influenced by Italian Futurism, French Dadaism, and satirical plays of Vilkolakis Theatre.

Tilvytis wrote rhymed feuilleton and satirical poems often based on current events that targeted bureaucrats, corruption, as well as the regime of President Antanas Smetona. His writings feature bitter mockery, harsh tone, contemptuous irony.

Poem Dičius (published in 1934) was turned into a TV film by the director Balys Bratkauskas in 1980. The poem contrasts poor village life with the corrupt life in Kaunas. Dičius, an honest village boy, travels to Kaunas to escape poverty and backwardness but perishes in the morally bankrupt city. In its own way, the poem imitates Pushkin's Eugene Onegin. Dičius was named after a brother of the opera singer Alodija Dičiūtė-Trečiokienė who was Tilvytis' school friend in Utena.

His poem Artojėliai (The Plowmen) was first written in 1930, but continued to be revised and added to until 1965 (part 2 added in 1940, part 3 in 1947, and part 4 in 1965). The poem presents tragicomedic and grotesque episodes from the Lithuanian Wars of Independence and derides social inequality. Tilvytis was inspired to write the work for the 500th anniversary of the Grand Duke Vytautas to showcase the contrast between different social classes, personified by a worker and a "bloody policeman". In the poem, Tilvytis paraphrased Lithuanian folk songs to discuss social issues.

Tilvytis published two novels, Ministerijos Rožė (Rožė of Ministry; 1931) and Kelionė aplink stalą (Journey Around the Table; 1936), that make fun of bureaucrats of interwar Kaunas. Ministerijos Rožė is a tabloid epistolary novel about naïve and easily swayed Rožė who worked for six years at a ministry. Due to debts, she prostitutes herself to various men – married officials, Catholic priests, etc. – before dying of tuberculosis. The novel was one of the first in Lithuania to mention lesbian love.

=== Soviet Lithuania ===
During the Soviet era, Tilvytis adopted the socialist realism style and praised the new communist regime. His poems became more descriptive and idealistic and borrowed stylistic elements from journalism.

His epic poem Usnynė (published in Russian translation as On the Lithuanian Land) was awarded the Stalin Prize in 1951. It was published in Lithuania four times (1949, 1951, 1962, and 1984) and was added to school curriculum. The poem describes lives of Lithuanian peasants from struggles in interwar Lithuania to building of the utopian socialism and happy life in a kolkhoz. The poem praised heroic fight of the Soviet partisans against the Nazis and of the destruction battalions against the Lithuanian "bandits" (i.e. Lithuanian partisans). The poem openly mentions Soviet practice of leaving dead bodies of Lithuanian partisans in town squares as a collective warning to others.

He published the poetry collections Baltijos vėjas (Wind From the Baltic; 1948), Sonetai apie laimę (Sonnets on Happiness; 1951), and Tėvynės laukuos (On Native Fields; 1953) as well as collections of satirical verse Nameliai mano brangūs (House of My Childhood; 1958) and Deja, dar pasitaiko (Alas, It Happens; 1964). He also published a travel book Vilnius–Stalinabad (1948).

He wrote the poem Daina gyvybės kaina (Song of the Expense of Life; 1962) in memory of poet Vytautas Montvila who was executed by the Nazis in 1941.

=== Translations ===
He translated works of Russian literature into Lithuanian, including fairy tales by Alexander Pushkin, fables by Ivan Krylov, narrative poem Vladimir Ilyich Lenin by Vladimir Mayakovsky.
