= Petras Tarulis =

Lithuanian writer (1896–1980)

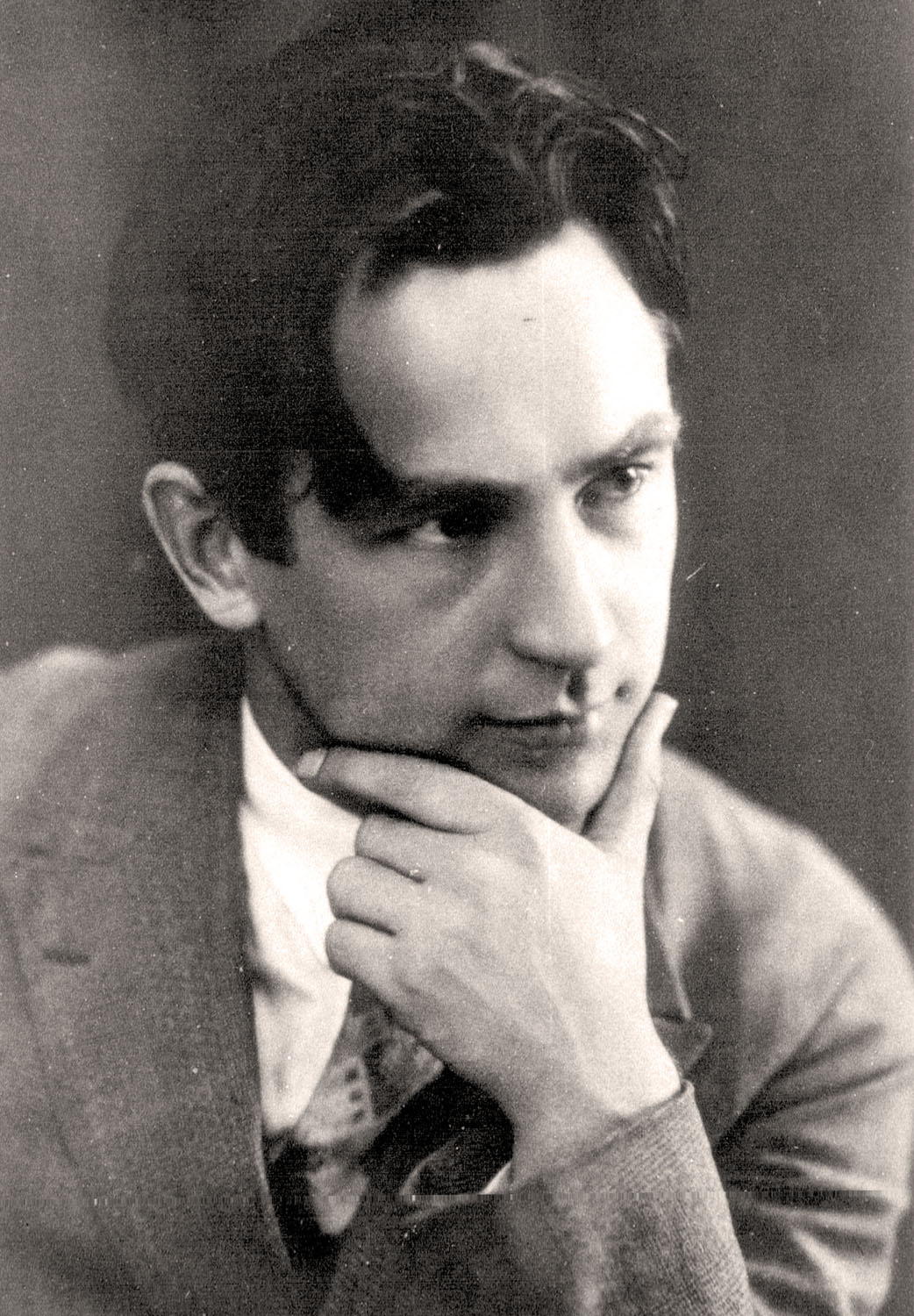
- Born: Juozas Petrėnas; 31 March 1896 Degučiai, Russian Empire
- Died: 5 February 1980 (aged 83) New York City, United States
- Resting place: Petrašiūnai Cemetery
- Occupation: Writer, journalist
- Literary movement: Keturvėjininkai

Petras Tarulis (born Juozas Petrėnas; 31 March 1896 – 5 February 1980) was a Lithuanian avant-garde writer and journalist. He was an active leader of the Keturvėjininkai movement. After Kazys Binkis distanced himself from the movement, Tarulis took over the leadership. He was the editor and is considered the most prolific author of the movement's magazine Keturi vėjai.

== Biography ==
=== Early life ===
Petras Tarulis was born on 31 March 1896 in the village of Degučiai (present-day Zarasai district), then part of the Russian Empire. He attended school in Utena, and later graduated from a gymnasium in Saint Petersburg. In Russia, Tarulis actively participated in Lithuanian-language reading events, gaining experience as a journalist by editing the Žiežirba magazine and publishing his own belles-lettres. At the end of 1916, Tarulis moved to Voronezh, where he established an amateur theater group named Skudučiai. It included the actress Nelė Vosyliūtė, and the group staged plays by Liudas Gira, Marcelinas Šikšnys, and Charles Dickens. He returned to Utena in 1917, where he wrote plays and ultimately released his first book Sodžiaus teatras under the pseudonym Brundelis. From 1918 to 1919 Tarulis worked as the head of the Education Section in the Utena County Executive Committee.

=== Interwar career ===
Eventually, Tarulis left for Vilnius. After Poland occupied the city, Tarulis briefly returned to Utena before finally settling in Kaunas, the designated temporary capital of Lithuania. Around 1920, Tarulis began engaging in Lithuanian literary and journalistic activities. Most notably, on 16 February 1922, he and Kazys Binkis published Keturių vėjų pranašas, a manifesto of the avant-garde literary Keturvėjininkai. A leader of the movement, Tarulis published the first issue of Keturi vėjai. Whereas Binkis sought avant-garde forms of writing in poetry, Tarulis explored prose. He also published futuristic short stories in the Skaitymai and Baras magazines. In 1923, Tarulis and Binkis published Vilnius 1323–1923, an album for Lithuanians to get acquainted with their old capital. In 1924, he created the phantasmagorical absurdist essay Nuovakarių skiauterys, which imitates the technique of reportage.

In 1927, Tarulis used Petras Tarulis (taken from his mother's maiden name Tarulytė) as a pseudonym for publishing Mėlynos kelnės, a collection of short experimental stories. The novella earned him a stipend, and Tarulis traveled to Paris where he studied journalism from 1926 to 1927. Tarulis at this point stopped writing, fully committing himself to editing magazines such as Dienos naujienos and Kultuvė. In 1932, Tarulis was a co-author of the Ars modern art movement manifesto. In 1933, Tarulis was the chief editor of Naujas žodis.

=== Later years ===
During the German occupation of Lithuania during World War II, Tarulis edited the Lietuvių archyvas, a publication dedicated to documenting Soviet actions during the first Soviet occupation of Lithuania (1940–1941). In 1944 Tarulis moved to Germany. Four years later, in 1948, he published Žirgeliai padebesiais, a collection of four short stories created in a displaced persons camp. After emigrating to Brooklyn in 1949, Tarulis began editing the Tėvynė and Nepriklausoma Lietuva magazines. In 1966 he published a novel entitled Vilniaus rūbas, later also publishing New Yorko žvirbliukas and Kauno gubernatoriaus pusryčiai. Both latter novels remained in his hand-corrected typescripts, which were brought to Lithuania along with his memories of his contemporaries. Tarulis died on 5 February 1980 in New York City. After his death, his remains were brought in an urn and buried at the Petrašiūnai Cemetery in Kaunas.

== Works ==
Tarulis's Mėlynos kelnės (1927) is characterized by a fragmentary, laconic narrative. It contains elements of the grotesque, has an emphasis on the vitality of the characters, and has a pronounced influence of expressionism and cinematic imagination. It contains a broken sentence structure and fragmented narrative style. His works are said to have influenced Petras Cvirka and Kazys Boruta. The collection Žirgeliai padebesiais (1948) realistically depicts the everyday life of Lithuanian villages and towns. The novel Vilniaus rūbas (1966) describes life in the Polish-occupied Vilnius region, while simultaneously developing the tradition of modern historicism and mythologicalism. The story follows an adventurer who made a fortune by selling fragments of the robe of the statue of St. Stanislaus, which supposedly grants miraculous blessings, to gullible people.

Tarulis also published a booklet of tips for rural amateur theater.

== See also ==
- Antanas Škėma
- Jurgis Savickis
