= People's Writer of the Lithuanian SSR =

Honorary title awarded in the Lithuanian SSR

The People's Writer of the Lithuanian SSR (Lithuanian: Lietuvos TSR liaudies rašytojas) was a state award and an honorary title of the Lithuanian SSR to distinguished Lithuanian writers. It was established in 1957 and awarded by the Presidium of the Supreme Soviet of the Lithuanian Soviet Socialist Republic. Frequently, the award was granted on the occasion of writer's anniversary. It was awarded until the re-established independence of Lithuania in 1990.

A similar title was the People's Poet of the Lithuanian SSR (Lietuvos TSR liaudies poetas).

== People's Writers ==
- 1957: Antanas Vienuolis-Žukauskas
- 1963: Vincas Mykolaitis-Putinas
- 1965: Antanas Venclova
- 1967: Ieva Simonaitytė
- 1968: Aleksandras Gudaitis-Guzevičius
- 1969: Juozas Baltušis
- 1971: Juozas Grušas
- 1974: Juozas Paukštelis
- 1979: Kostas Korsakas
- 1983: Alfonsas Bieliauskas
- 1984: Mykolas Sluckis
- 1986: Jonas Avyžius

== See also ==
- People's Writer for titles of this type in other places
- People's Artist of the Lithuanian SSR
