= People's Artist =

Honorary title

People's Artist is an honorary title in the Soviet Union, Union republics, in some other Eastern bloc states (and communist states in general), as well as in a number of post-Soviet states, modeled after the title of the People's Artist of the USSR.

== Russia ==
The term is confusingly used to translate two different Russian language titles: "народный артист" (awarded in performing arts, see e.g., Category:People's Artists of the USSR) and "народный художник" (awarded in some visual arts: painting drawing, and photography, see e.g., Category:People's Artists of the USSR (visual arts)). Both titles are awarded for exceptional achievements in the corresponding arts.

Some other arts gave rise special titles: People's Architect, People's Writer, People's Poet.

== Vietnam ==
In Vietnam the abbreviation NSND (Nghệ sĩ Nhân dân, People's Artist of Vietnam) is used. This is Vietnam's top artistic award for a living artist – second only to the often posthumous Ho Chi Minh Prize. The youngest ever recipient is the Russian-trained classical pianist Đặng Thái Sơn in 1984. The youngest female recipient ever is the singer, songwriter, and composer Phạm Phương Thảo in 2023. Other notable recipients include Bạch Tuyết. The lesser award of Merited Artist of Vietnam is abbreviated NSƯT.

== China ==
The People's Artist (Chinese: 人民艺术家) is a type of national honorary titles. Currently 7 people are rated as this title:

1. Lao She, awarded by Beijing Municipality Government in 1951
2. Qi Baishi, awarded by Ministry of Culture of PRC Central Government in 1953
3. Chang Xiangyu, awarded posthumously by State Council in 2004
4. Wang Meng
5. Qin Yi
6. Guo Lanying, these three are awarded by SCNPC in 2019
7. Tian Hua, awarded by SCNPC in 2024

== See also ==
- List of People's Artists of Azerbaijan
- Merited Artist of the Russian Federation
- National Artist
- People's Artist of Ukraine
- People's Artist of Albania
