= Ričardas Gavelis =

Lithuanian writer (1950–2002)

- Born: 8 November 1950; Vilnius, Lithuania
- Died: 18 August 2002 (aged 51); Vilnius, Lithuania
- Resting place: Antakalnis Cemetery
- Education: Druskininkai High School; Vilnius University
- Occupations: Novelist; playwright; journalist; theoretical physicist
- Spouse: Nijolė Gavelienė (m. 1975)
- Writing career
- Years active: 1976–2002
- Period: Era of Stagnation, Perestroika, newly-independent Lithuania
- Genres: Literary realism, psychology, surrealism, erotica, satire
- Subjects: Totalitarianism, Lithuanian identity, psychology
- Notable works: Vilnius Poker (1989); Memoirs of a Young Man (1991)

Ričardas Gavelis (8 October 1950 – 18 August 2002) was a Lithuanian writer, playwright, journalist, and theoretical physicist. He is most known for novels such as Vilnius Poker and Memoirs of a Young Man.

Gavelis grew up near a monastery in the Vilnius Old Town in the 1950s. After completing high school in Druskininkai, he moved back to Vilnius to pursue a degree in theoretical physics, graduating in 1973. As a new and promising physicist, he became involved in the Physics and Mathematics Institute of the Lithuanian Academy of Sciences, after which he began journalistic work. He debut with a collection of short stories in 1976 and continued to write short stories, dramas and screenplays. Gavelis published Vilnius Poker (Vilniaus pokeris), his most famous work, in 1989. He died in 2002.

== Biography ==
=== Early life ===
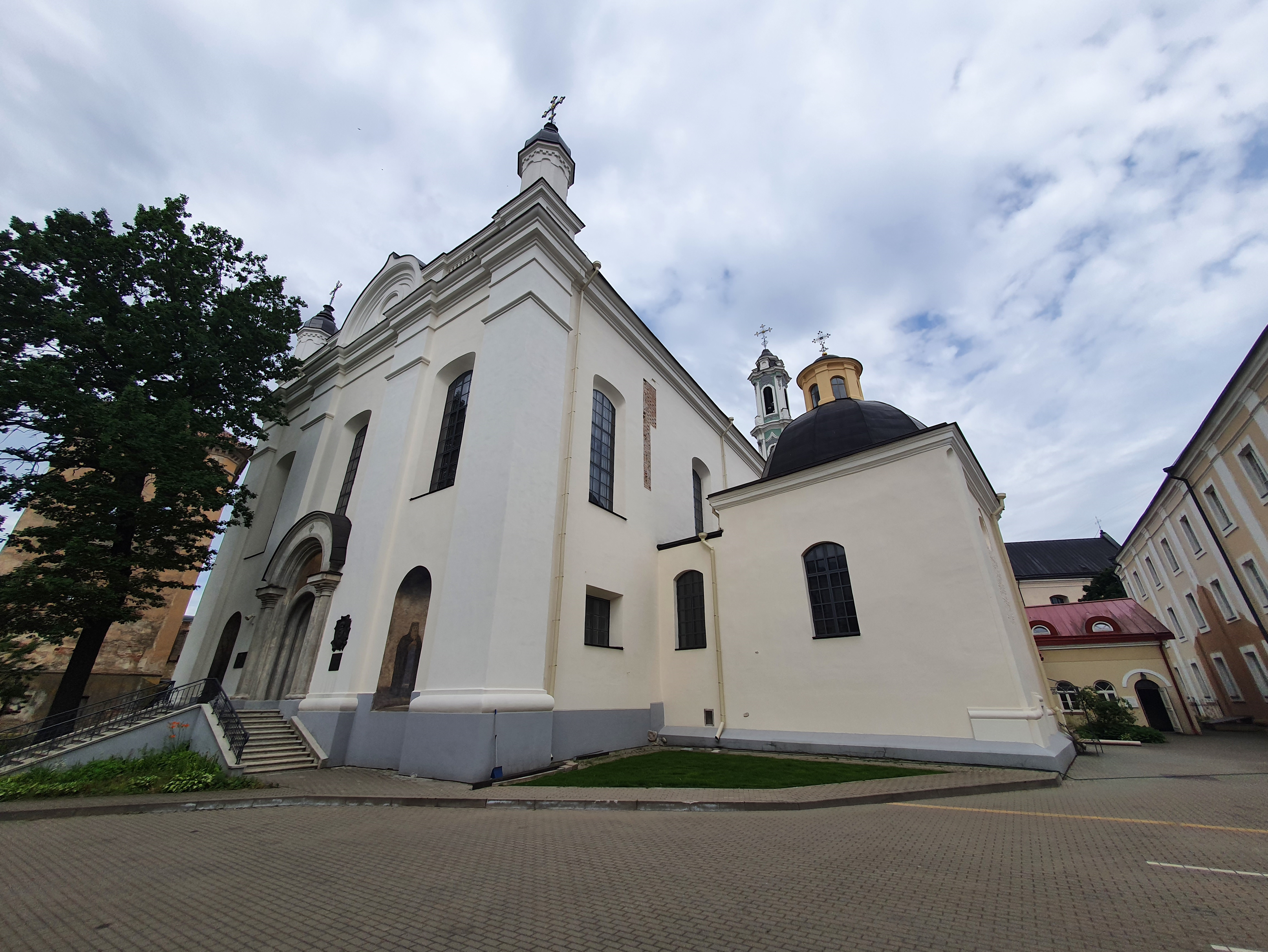
Greek Catholic Church of Holy Trinity in Vilnius. Gavelis grew up in its courtyard.

Ričardas Gavelis was born on 8 October 1950, (Note: Officially, 8 November. This date was also used on his passport and other encyclopedias.) in a Red Cross maternity hospital in Vilnius to mathematician Vytautas Gavelis (1928–1991) and physicist Vanda Gavelienė (née Riaubaitė) (1926–2013). Gavelis' grandfather was a pedantic farmer who mortgaged his farm immediately after inheriting it, after which he traveled to South Africa in 1925 to work in a diamond mine. During Soviet occupation of Lithuania, he owned a large amount of land and avoided deportation to Siberia by bribing government officials. Gavelis' mother was an enjoyer of literature from an early age due to the influence of her father. She looked up to her physics teacher as an inspiration and studied physics in Vilnius and later became a teacher, like her husband.

Gavelis lived facing the courtyard of the Monastery of the Holy Trinity, not far from the Vilnius Gate of Dawn. At that time, the monastery was a wine factory. Childhood places were often depicted in his novels, such as the monastery being the one described in his novel Vilnius Poker. In 1961, at the age of eleven, he and his parents moved to Druskininkai – both Gavelis' parents worked as teachers there previously. He studied at the Druskininkai High School (Druskininkų 1-oji vidurinė mokykla). At the age of 5, Gavelis learned to read in Lithuanian and Russian. He stood out for his intelligence and tendency to talk to older people rather than peers. Although his school year literary works were graded the highest, he did not participate in any literary competitions. He attended music school, played lots of sports, however always held a high interest in physics. He graduated in 1968.

=== Studies and career in Soviet Lithuania ===
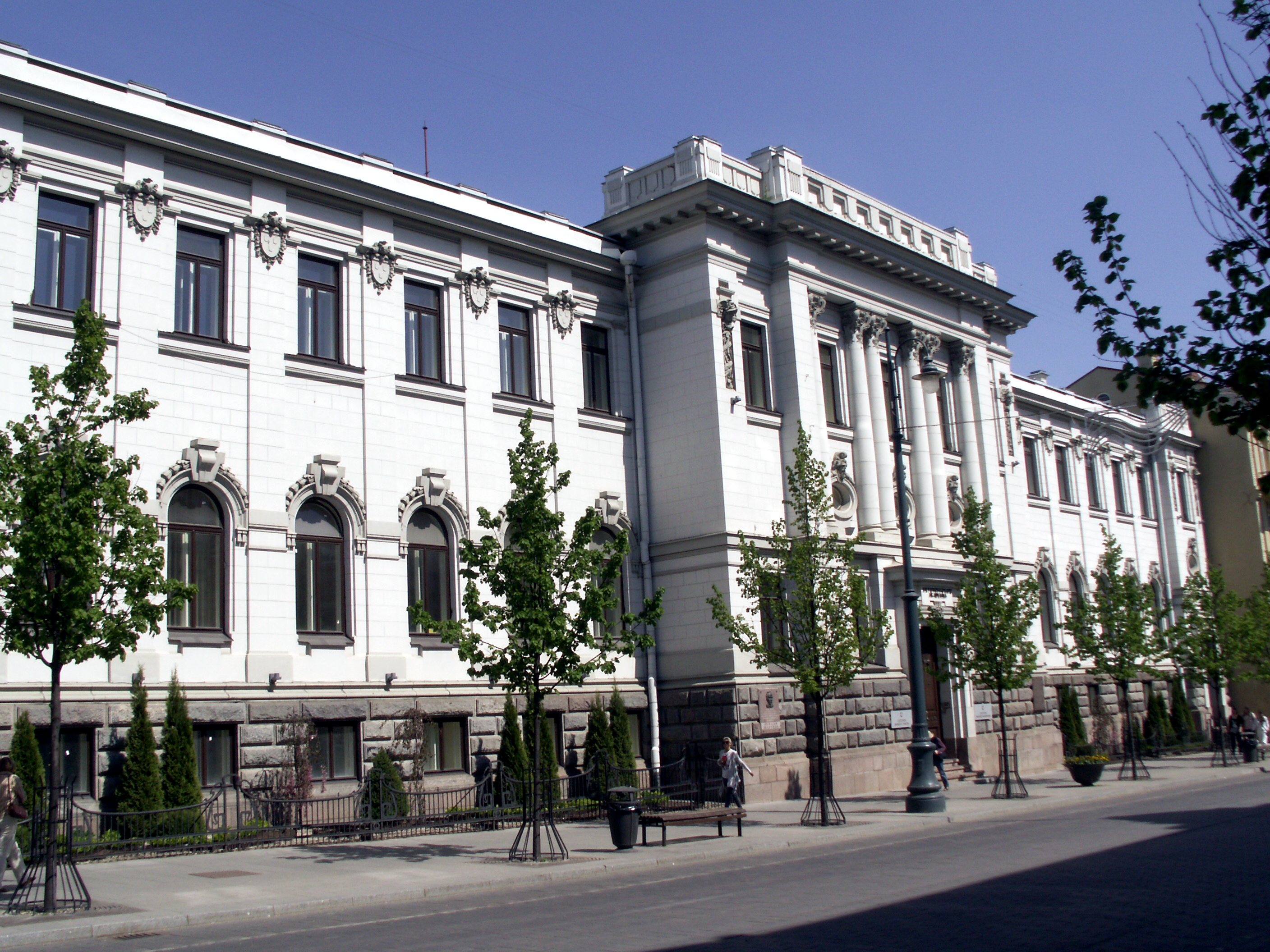
Gavelis studied physics at the Lithuanian Academy of Sciences.

In 1969 he returned to Vilnius and began studying physics at Vilnius University. In 1973 he graduated with commendation with a degree in theoretical physics and up until 1977 worked at the Physics and Mathematics Institute of the Lithuanian Academy of Sciences. In 1975 he married fellow physicist Nijolė Paukštytė. As a physicist, Gavelis was considered one of the most promising new theorists of his generation, actively involved in the research of ferroelectricity and phase transitions. During almost five years of work, he published two significant scientific works.

He was writing his first work as early as 1973. His literary debut was a collection of short stories entitled Neprasidėjusi šventė, published in 1976 in the newspaper Nemunas, for which he was criticized for plagiarizing Gabriel García Márquez. He also began creating dramas such as Inadaptus (1976) and Sūkuriai (1977). From 1978 to 1980 he was employed in the editorial department of the magazine Mokslas ir gyvenimas. Around 1980 he purchased a flat in Karoliniškės and lived there for the remainder of his life. Gavelis spoke of the place as having a lack of a feeling of neighborhood and community. Such themes would appear in his later novel Memoirs of a Young Man. During this time, he wrote his first screenplay Rungtynės nuo 9 iki 9 (1980). He published two subsequent novels entitled Įsibrovėliai (1982) and Nubaustieji (1987), as well as another drama called Triumviratas (1986). He briefly worked in the editorial department of the magazine Pergalė from 1988 to 1989.

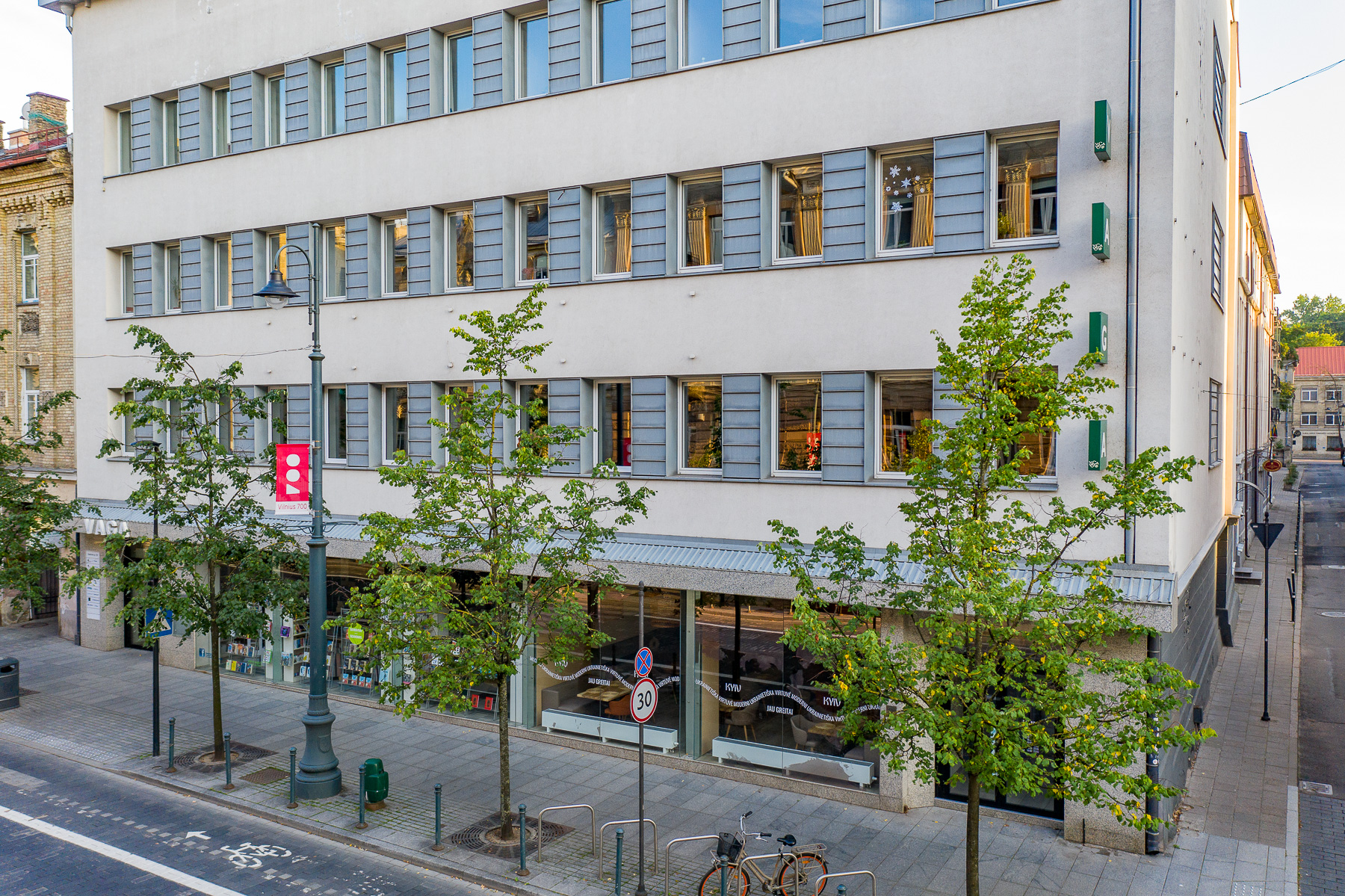
Vaga publishing house in Vilnius.

Gavelis was already writing Vilnius Poker as early as 1980, as is evident by letters he sent his friend Levas Rabšteinas. In late 1988 or early 1989 Gavelis sent the manuscript to the senior deputy editor of Vaga Publishers, Aleksandras Krasnovas. Initially, the publishing would have taken two years, but Krasnovas attempted to fasten and change the publishing so that it would not reach ardent censors. Gavelis strictly forbade any edits of his manuscript, even grammar itself, although later when confronted with mistakes he accepted that they should be fixed. The book appeared publicly in November 1989, just after the fall of the Berlin Wall, also coinciding with Juozas Aputis's modernist novel Anthill in Prussia. The novel was published with 50,000 copies and propelled Gavelis to fame; he was often invited to interviews and television, and was the subject of discussion in newspapers.

=== Post-independence career and later years ===
In 1991 he published Memoirs of a Young Man (Jauno žmogaus memuarai). From 1992 to 2002 he worked as a news analyst for the daily Respublika and weekly Veidas magazines. In 1995 he published Taikos balandis. In 1993 he wrote a sequel to Vilnius Poker, Vilnius Jazz (Vilniaus Džiazas). Gavelis dedicated a book to Vitas Lingys, a journalist killed by criminals, entitled Nemirtingumas in 1994. He then wrote three novels over the course of five years – Paskutinioji žemės žmonių karta (1995), Prarastų godų kvartetas (1997), Septyni savižudybės būdai (1999). In 2000 he was awarded the Vilnius Club and Television Literary Prize. He wrote his final novel, Sun Tzu gyvenimas šventame Vilniaus mieste, in 2002. Gavelis also co-wrote the screenplay with Algimantas Puipa of the movie Forest of the Gods (Dievų miškas), released only in 2005.

Ričardas Gavelis died on 18 August 2002, aged 52, of heart failure. Condolences were given by the Lithuanian president Valdas Adamkus. He is buried in the Antakalnis Cemetery.

A book that was a collection of memories about Gavelis, as well as his manuscripts, letters, essays, and creative analysis of his work, was published in 2007. Gavelis was honored with a plaque along with other writers in 2008 in a pedestrian hallway situated on Literatai Street. In 2020, a square on Drujos Street was named after him. A memorial plaque was uncovered in 2021 in Druskininkai.

== Literary work ==
=== Themes ===
The fear of persecution is one of the most interesting human manias. Under its pretext you can write many interesting books and present very mesmerizing images and metaphors. The entire mania of persecution is based on fear – the fear of the unknown, the fear of not knowing. I played and played this instrument while I could...

— Ričardas Gavelis

Ričardas Gavelis was one of the most prominent writers of modernism and postmodernism in Lithuanian literature. As a writer under Soviet censorship, he never showed his manuscripts to friends or his wife, suffering bouts of insomnia as a result of censorship and paranoia. His manuscript of Vilnius Poker was locked in a briefcase and successfully hidden from Soviet authorities. Gavelis's works explore the nature and relationship of power and evil, and are characterized by themes of death and erotica. In shorter novels, such as Neprasidėjusi šventė, Įsibrovėliai, Nubaustieji, and Taikos balandis, he explored the motives of human behavior in situations such as disease, exile, and murder. Characters in Gavelis' works are often paranoid and schizophrenic, often seeing phantasmagorical visions and nightmares. His work has been described as "intended to mercilessly return readers to the hated and denied inner reality, which needs to be experienced once again" and "anti-romantic", although playful satire and irony is also present. Gavelis' work became known for its intriguing and deliberately provocative prose, which "retained something of the scientist's logic". Gavelis was strongly influenced by James Joyce. Gavelis's works have been translated into English, Latvian, French, Polish, Finnish, German, Macedonian and Belarusian.

==== Vilnius Poker ====
Vilnius Poker was written in completely untraditional prose for Lithuanian literature – the story consists of the events of a single week in October told by four different narrators, one of them a dog. Gavelis, in his other works as well, depicts Vilnius as a city with its own identity as if it were a separate character and gave it a metaphysical, mystical aura. For example, in Taikos balandis, which was written during Lithuania's early years of unstable independence, Gavelis displays Vilnius as a consequence of the Soviet way of life and corruption within the newly formed government. In Vilnius Poker Gavelis also satirizes the gloomy way of life under totalitarianism, wherein the heroes of novels hide sexual perversions, sadism, madness, violence, and all other negative human qualities under the masks of obedience and decency. A big part of the novel is characterized by a force called "They", which Gavelis explained in an interview was "a force within people that is responsible for the formation of totalitarian systems. Before starting to write I reached the conclusion that this senseless system cannot be explained by the intellect. Indeed, at times "They" confine themselves to the finest building in Vilnius, and sometimes expand to distant historical times."

==== Memoirs of a Young Man ====
Memoirs of a Young Man, written as early as 1987, is a fictionary memoir told by Levas Ciparis, a student who writes fourteen letters from the afterlife to his mentor and fellow student Tomas Kelertas, a man with completely different views than him. Each letter has a specific theme and tells the life story of Levas, who wants to belong to a community and is searching for a meaning of life. Gavelis depicts the effects a totalitarian regime can have on the mind of a young person. The novel also mentions the accident of the Vilnius pontoon bridge, where censorship and state policies prohibited people from knowing the true casualties of the accident, making a secondary character in the story go insane because he refused to sign the fake death warrants of the victims. Gavelis often sought to bring Lithuania to Western literature, and it is reflected in the novel's character Tomas Kelertas, the alter ego of Gavelis (who also appears in other novels), who sought to "forge the non-existent soul of Lithuania". Gavelis often explores the themes of Lithuania's identity. In 1989, pertaining to that notion, Gavelis wrote that "we have to search for Lithuanian uniqueness and express it in a European context. There is no other way. We are Europeans - so let's be Europeans", so criticizing "Lithuanian provincialism". The novel is marked by unique terms like GGI (God's Great Injustice, which is, according to Kelertas, the foundation of the world order); The Great Community (the Communist Party), and Phantasmagorical Spores (of Communist ideology, transforming people into metaphysical earthworms).

== Views and personality ==
Gavelis explained, in the last interview recorded, creating novels for him is like jazz, in that it's unpredictable and the plot often changes during the process of writing. In the last years of his life, Gavelis was a recluse who occasionally drank and browsed the internet for most of the day. Gavelis liked blues and good-quality whiskey; according to his wife, "he played poker with demons and death". A supporter of the "theory of population genetics", Gavelis held pro-European views. Gavelis viewed culture as a "common way of living for humans, and most importantly, a common way of thinking" and that "culture is spiritual civilization".

== Bibliography ==
- Neprasidėjusi šventė, short stories, Vilnius: Vaga, 1976
- Įsibrovėliai, short stories, Vilnius: Vaga, 1982
- Nubaustieji, short stories, Vilnius: Vaga, 1987
- Vilniaus pokeris, novel, Vilnius: Vaga, 1989
- Jauno žmogaus memuarai, novel, Vilnius: Vaga, 1991
- Vilniaus džiazas, novel, Vilnius: Vaga, 1993
- Paskutinioji žemės žmonių karta, novel, Vilnius: Vaga, 1995
- Taikos balandis, short stories, Vilnius: Alma littera, 1995
- Prarastų godų kvartetas, novel, Vilnius: Tyto alba, 1997
- Septyni savižudybių būdai, novel, Vilnius: Tyto alba, 1999
- Sun–Tzu gyvenimas šventame Vilniaus mieste, novel, Vilnius: Tyto alba, 2002

Translated into English:

- Handless and A Report on Ghosts, short stories, in Come Into My Time: Lithuania in Prose Fiction, 1970-90, ed. Violeta Kelertas. Urbana: University of Illinois, 1992, ISBN 978-0-252-06237-7
- Vilnius Poker, translation of Vilniaus pokeris. Rochester, NY: Open Letter Press, 2009. Translated by Elizabeth Novickas. ISBN 978-1-934824-05-4 Reissued in paperback by Pica Pica Press, 2016, ISBN 978-0996630429
- Memoirs of a Life Cut Short, translation of Jauno žmogaus memuarai. Glasgow: Vagabond Voices, 2018. Translated by Jayde Will. ISBN 978-1908251817
- Sun-Tzu's Life in the Holy City of Vilnius, translation of Sun-Tzu gyvenimas šventame Vlniaus mieste. Flossmoor, IL: Pica Pica Press, 2019. Translated by Elizabeth Novickas. ISBN 978-0996630436

Translated into French:

- Vilnius Poker, translation of Vilniaus pokeris, Arles : Monsieur Toussaint Louverture, 2014. Translated by Margarita Le Borgne. ISBN 979-1090724174

Translated into German:

- Vilnius Poker, Frankfurt am Main, S. FISCHER Verlag, 2024, translated by Claudia Sinnig. ISBN 978-3-10-397578-9

Translated into Macedonian:

- „Покер во Вилнус", translation of "Vilniaus pokeris", Antolog, 2013, ISBN 9786084507949

== Sources ==
=== Bibliographical sources ===
- Bliuzas Ričardui Gaveliui: atsiminimai, užrašai paraštėse, laiškai, eseistika, kūrybos analizė. Vilnius: Tyto alba, 2007 ISBN 978-9986-16-530-9
- Benjaminas, Kondratas. Ričardas Gavelis. Vilnius, 2014
- Gavelis, Ričardas. Asmenybės 1990–2015 m. Lietuvos pasiekimai. Kaunas: Leidybos Idėjų Centras, 2015 ISBN 978-609-95578-3-0
- Ivanauskienė, Milda. Ričardas Gavelis. Vilnius, 2014
- Sprindytė, Jūratė. Gavelis Ričardas. Vilnius: Mokslo ir enciklopedijų leidybos centras, 2010
- Žemgulytė, Paulina. Premija Ričardui Gaveliui. 2000
