= People's Poet of the Lithuanian SSR =

Honorary title in the Lithuanian SSR

The People's Poet of the Lithuanian SSR (Lithuanian: Lietuvos TSR liaudies poetas) was an honorary title and a state award of the Lithuanian SSR for distinguished Lithuanian poets. It was established in 1954 and awarded by the Presidium of the Supreme Soviet of the Lithuanian Soviet Socialist Republic. It was awarded until the re-established independence of Lithuania in 1990.

A similar title was the People's Writer of the Lithuanian SSR (Lietuvos TSR liaudies rašytojas).

== People's Poets ==
- 1945: Liudas Gira
- 1954: Salomeja Neris (post mortem)
- 1954: Teofilis Tilvytis
- 1960: Jonas Krikščiūnas
- 1974: Eduardas Mieželaitis
- 1978: Justinas Marcinkevičius
- 1984: Alfonsas Maldonis
- 1986: Algimantas Baltakis

== See also ==
- People's Poet for titles of this type in other places
