= Vytautas Kubilius =

Lithuanian critic and political activist (1928–2004)

Vytautas Kubilius (November 23, 1928, Aukštadvarys, Rokiškis district, Lithuania — February 17, 2004, Vilnius) was a Lithuanian literary critic and political activist.

Kubilius was an author of numerous articles and monographs about Lithuanian literature and writers. He took part in Sąjūdis movement, and was a co-founder of the Lithuanian Citizens' Charter movement (Lietuvos piliečių chartija) and the chairman of its Council since 1991.

Kubilius was the father of Andrius Kubilius, a Lithuanian politician. He was fatally hit by a motorist at a crosswalk in Vilnius on February 17, 2004. He was awarded the Officer's Cross of the Order of the Lithuanian Grand Duke Gediminas (1998).

== Works ==
=== Biographies ===
- Teofilis Tilvytis (Теофилис Тильвитис). Moscow, 1958.
- Julius Janonis. 1962.
- Salomėjos Nėries lyrika. 1968.
- Kazio Borutos kūryba. 1980.
- Ievos Simonaitytės kūryba. 1987.
- Antanas Vaičiulaitis. 1993.
- Jonas Aistis. 1999.
- Dviese literatūros sūpuoklėse: Kazys Puida ir Vaidilutė. 2003.

=== Other ===
- Naujų kelių ieškant. 1964.
- Modern Lithuanian Poetry (Современная литовская поэзия). Moscow, 1969.
- XX amžiaus lietuvių poetai. 1980.
- XX amžiaus lietuvių lyrika. Vilnius: Vaga, 1982. 397 p.
- Lietuvių literatūra ir pasaulinės literatūros procesas. Vilnius: Vaga, 1983. 470 p.
- Žanrų kaita ir sintezė. 1986.
- Problemos ir situacijos. 1990.
- Romantizmo tradicija lietuvių literatūroje. Vilnius: Amžius, 1993. 206 p.
- XX amžiaus literatūra: Lietuvių literatūros istorija. Vilnius: Alma littera, Lietuvių literatūros ir tautosakos institutas, 1995. 719 p. ISBN 9986-02-124-3.
- XX amžiaus lietuvių literatūra: Lietuvių literatūros istorija. 2-asis patais. leid. Vilnius: Alma littera, Lietuvių literatūros ir tautosakos institutas, 1996.
- Literatūra istorijos lūžyje. 1997.
- Literatur in Freiheit und Unfreiheit. Die Geschichte der litauischen Literatur von der Staatsgrϋndung bis zur Gegenwart. Aus dem Litauschen von Cornelius Hell und Lina Pestal. Oberhausen - Vilnius: Athena-Verkag, Alma littera, 2002. 286 S. ISBN 3-89896-134-6, ISBN 9955-08-178-3.
