= Grušas =

- Lithuanian surname
- m.: Grušas
- f.: (unmarried): Grušaitė
- f.: (married): Grušienė
- Related names: Gruša

Grušas is a Lithuanian surname. Notable people with the surname include:

- Gintaras Grušas, Lithuanian-American prelate
- Juozas Grušas
