= Juozas Aputis =

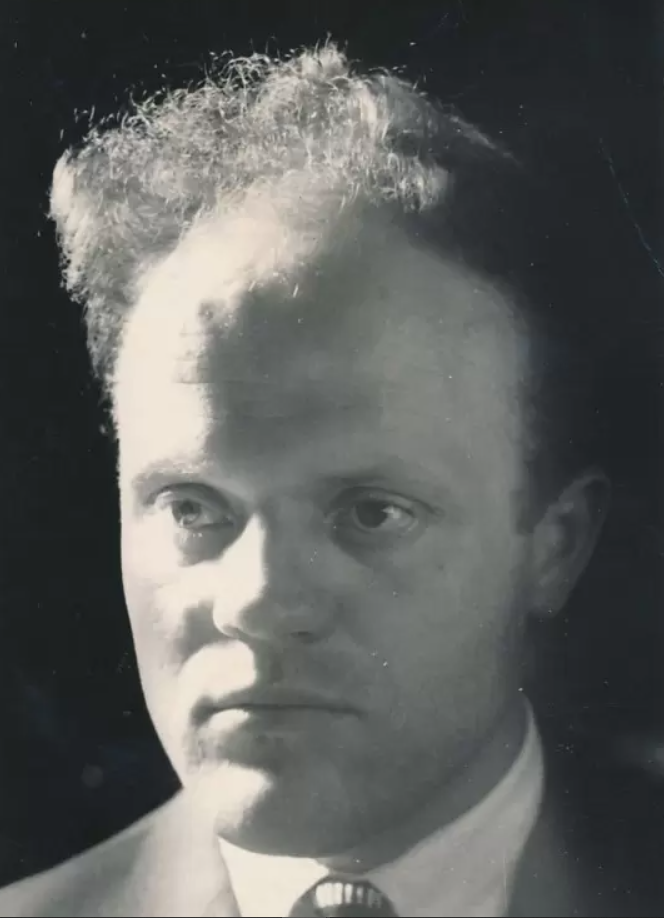
- Juozas Aputis, c. 1960
- Born: 8 June 1936; Balčiai, Raseiniai district, Lithuania
- Died: 28 February 2010 (aged 73); Vilnius, Lithuania
- Resting place: Antakalnis Cemetery
- Education: Vilnius University
- Occupations: Novelist; editor; translator
- Spouse: Virginija Aputienė (?–2010)
- Writing career
- Years active: 1963–2010
- Period: Soviet period in Lithuania, newly-independent Lithuania
- Genres: Literary realism, modernism
- Subjects: Totalitarianism, Lithuanian identity, psychology
- Notable work: Anthill in Prussia (1989)

Juozas Aputis (8 June 1936 – 28 February 2010) was a Lithuanian modernist writer, translator and editor. Along with other writers such as Ričardas Gavelis, Aputis is credited for the post-war modernist novella revival in the Lithuanian SSR. He is best known for depicting village life with psychological insight and subtext. His most famous work is Anthill in Prussia (Skruzdėlynas Prūsijoje), which tells the story of an ascetic man and woman who retreat into the Prussian wilderness.

== Biography ==
=== Early life ===
Juozas Aputis was born on 8 June 1936 in the village of Balčiai of the Raseiniai district in Lithuania. In 1948 he graduated from primary school in Balčiai. In 1950 Aputis graduated from the Nemakščiai gymnasium and four years later in 1954 graduated from the Viduklė high school. From 1954 to 1955 Aputis acted as the head of the Balčiai reading club. From 1959 (to 1969) Aputis worked in the biweekly Lithuanian Writers' Union magazine Literatūra ir menas. In 1960 Aputis graduated from Vilnius University, where he studied the Lithuanian language as well as Lithuanian literature.

=== Career ===
In 1963 Aputis published his first short story collection entitled Žydi bičių duona. In 1967, besides publishing another collection entitled Rugsėjo paukščiai, Aputis became a member of the Lithuanian Writers' Union. The same year Aputis began writing his most famous work, Skruzdėlynas Prūsijoje (Anthill in Prussia), although it would not be published in 1989 due to Soviet censorship, coinciding both with the Fall of the Berlin Wall as well as Ričardas Gavelis's release of Vilnius Poker in November. From 1969 to 1977 Aputis worked as an editor of the Girios magazine. In 1970 he published Horizonte bėga šernai. From 1972 Aputis lived in the village of Zervynai, wher he spent time writing and interacting with the locals. From 1980 to 1990 Aputis edited the Pergalė magazine, from 1991 to 2001 – the Metai magazine. Later, Aputis returned to work in the Pergalė magazine for a year, later switching again to being the Metai magazine's senior editor from 1991 to 1994.In 1977 Aputis wrote the script for the film Mano vaikystės ruduo. In 1996 Aputis wrote his longest novel, Smėlynuose negalima sustoti. Aputis continued publishing novels, novellas, and essays throughout his life up until his death. Aputis translated works by Vasil Bykaŭ, Anton Chekhov, Vasily Shukshin, Dmitry Grigorovich, and Yury Trifonov, among others.

=== Death ===
Juozas Aputis died on 28 February 2010 in Vilnius. He was buried in the Antakalnis Cemetery.

== Literary work ==
We are divided like an atom. We are uncategorical, each set of our work and action is only the flash of a moment. Because we are unable to tie ourselves to one thing, one truth for a long time, we are moral and spiritual eels, which is why we cannot live through great tragedies, and neither through great joys.

— Juozas Aputis

According to literary critic Jūratė Sprindytė, "Aputis is one of the most original and profound portrayers of rural life, vividly capturing the mind and heart". Aputis' stories are considered to be at the forefront of the literature modernist revival of Lithuania, closely aligned to that of Ričardas Gavelis. Like Gavelis, Aputis criticized the Soviet system's negative impact on a human's conscience and the overall experience of a person's feelings in a restrictive society. Aputis' early work is marked by a strong autobiographical undertone, the depiction of fatherland and close people. His first two novellas contain elements of the sudden appearance of memories and dream-like poetics. Characters of Aputis' novels explore the human condition and are marked by a metaphysical, existential anxiety regardless of age, origin, and profession, then unseen in Lithuanian literature. According to literary critic Albertas Zalatorius, Aputis considered humanity to be the most reliable value, and the ability to hold back, not to bow down to stupidity or brute force was the main support of self-esteem and a guarantee of success.

In his most famous work, Anthill in Prussia, Aputis allegorically portrays the relationship between individuals and history, as well as resistance to violence arising at the junction of rationality and irrationality.

Aputis' works have been translated to Latvian, Belarusian, Russian, Armenian, Hungarian, and German.

== Awards ==
Aputis received in the Žemaitė literature prize (Žemaitės literatūrinė premija) in 1971. In 1996 he received the Juozas Paukštelis literature prize, and in 1996 he was awarded the Order of Gediminas 4th degree In 1997 he received the Antanas Vačiulaitis literature prize, and the following year in 1998 received the award of Lithuanian Culture and Art. In 2001 he was awarded the Varpai literature prize, in 2004 the Jurgis Kunčinas prize, and in 2005 – the Lithuanian National Prize for Culture and Arts and the Veliuona novella prize (previously the Petras Cvirka prize).

== Bibliography ==
- Žydi bičių duona. Vilnius: Vaga, 1963
- Rugsėjo paukščiai. Vilnius: Vaga, 1967
- Horizonte bėga šernai (Wild boars running on the horizon). Vilnius: Vaga, 1970
- Sugrįžimas vakarėjančiais laukais. Vilnius: Vaga, 1977
- Tiltas per Žalpę. Vilnius: Vaga, 1980
- Link debesijos. Vilnius: Vaga, 1984
- Keleivio novelės. Vilnius: Vaga, 1985
- Gegužė ant nulūžusio beržo. Vilnius: Vaga, 1986
- Skruzdėlynas Prūsijoje. Vilnius: Vaga, 1989. ISBN 978-5-415-00287-0
- Vargonų balsas skalbykloje: apysaka. Vilnius: Versmė, 1991.
- Dvi apysakos. Vilnius: Baltos lankos, 1996. ISBN 978-9986-403-88-3
- Smėlynuose negalima sustoti. – Vilnius: Lietuvos rašytojų sąjungos leidykla, 1996. ISBN 978-9986-413-89-9
- Novelės. Vilnius: Žaltvykslė, 2004. ISBN 978-9986-06-044-4
- Vieškelyje džipai. Vilnius: Lietuvos rašytojų sąjungos leidykla, 2005. ISBN 978-9986-39-363-4
- Maži atsakymai į didelius klausimus: pokalbiai, esė. Vilnius: Alma littera, 2006. ISBN 978-9955-24-077-8
- Bėgiai išnyksta rūke: apysakos. Vilnius: Lietuvos rašytojų sąjungos leidykla, 2010. ISBN 978-9986-39-633-8

== Sources ==
=== Bibliographical sources ===
- Kubilius, Vytautas. XX amžiaus literatūra. ISBN 978-9986-02-289-3
- Vanagas, Vytautas. Lietuvos rašytojų sąvadas. Vaga Publishers
- Zalatorius, Albertas. Prozos gyvybė ir negalia. Vilnius: Vaga Publishers, 1988
