= Aurelijus =

Aurelijus is a Lithuanian masculine given name, which is a variant of the Roman name Aurelius, and is derived from the Latin aureus, meaning "golden" or "gilded". The female equivalent is Aurelija. The name may refer to:

- Aurelija Mikušauskaitė (1937–1974), Lithuanian actress
- Aurelijus Skarbalius (born 1973), Lithuanian football player and coach
- Aurelijus Zukauskas (born 1973), Lithuanian basketball player
