= Baltušis =

- Lithuanian surname
- m.: Baltušis
- f.: (unmarried): Baltušytė
- f.: (married): Baltušienė

Baltušis (feminine Baltušienė/Baltušytė) is a Lithuanian surname. Notable people with the surname include:

- Feliksas Baltušis-Žemaitis (1897–1957), Red Army General;
- Juozas Baltušis (1909–1991), Soviet writer.
