= Kazys Šimonis =

Lithuanian painter

Kazys Šimonis (25 August 1887 – 5 July 1978) was a Lithuanian painter.

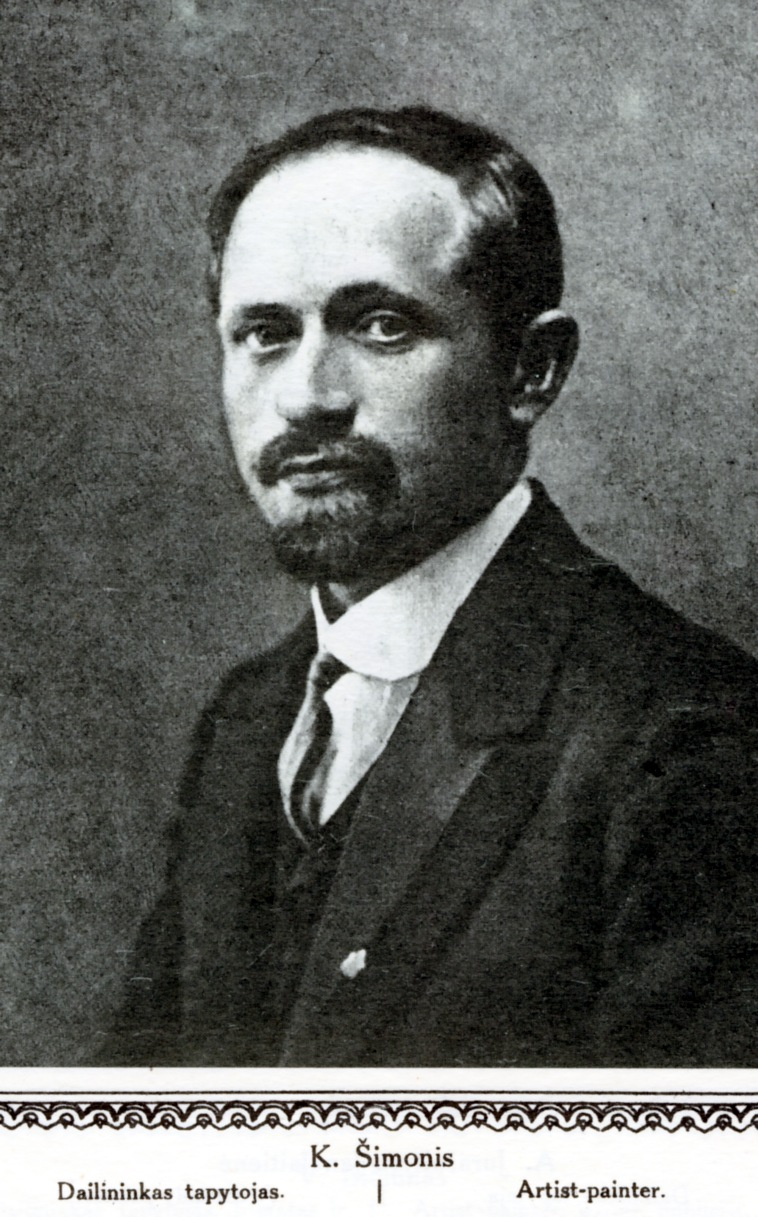

== Biography ==
Kazys Šimonis was born on August 25, 1887, in Starkonys, near Kupiškis, northern Lithuania. He studied organs. He was also interested in history and ethnography. Between 1909 and 1911, he worked for his brother in the United States. In 1911, he returned to Lithuania and was called up for military service in the Imperial Russian Army. He painted and studied episodically with Tadas Daugirdas (1908–1910), local painters, while serving in the army in Kiev (1911–1917), and Fedosejevo during evening drawing courses (1917–1918) in Saint Petersburg.

In 1919, he settled in Kaunas and actively participated in the Lithuanian cultural life. Between 1919 and 1924, he taught drawing and penmanship at Kaunas Aušra high school, along with teacher training courses. In 1920–1921, he attended the private art school of Adomas Varnas. In 1923, he studied art in Berlin.

In 1923 and 1924, he taught drawing at teacher courses organized by Juozas Damijonaitis. In 1926, he received a two-year grant to study in Paris at the Ministry of Education. Between 1934 and 1945, he worked at the Kaunas School of Art (since 1941, Kaunas Applied and Decorative Art Institute) as the library manager. In 1945–1950, he was the director of the museum of the Kaunas Applied and Decorative Arts Institute. In 1951–1959, he worked as a technician at the Architecture Department of Kaunas Polytechnic Institute. He died at the age of 91 and was buried in Petrašiūnai Cemetery in Kaunas.

== Awards ==
- 1962: Honored Artist of the Lithuanian SSR
- 1972: People's Artistof the Lithuanian SSR

== Works ==
Šimonis created about 2,000 works of art – landscapes, portraits, fantasy paintings, as well as ex-libris, posters, proposals for postage stamps, and decorative panels in Birštonas (1938). He collected and painted folk art, architectural monuments. His individual exhibitions were held in 1925, 1926, 1927, 1929, 1949, 1958, 1967, 1972, 1977 in Kaunas, 1925 in Washington, D.C., Boston, Chicago, 1926 in Riga, 1927 in Klaipėda and Paris, 1968 and 1975 in Vilnius. He published his memoirs Gyvenimo nuotrupos (Fragments of Life) in 1959.

He developed his own interpretation of the prevailing artistic movements: cubism, expressionism, rayonism. In the early creative period, Šimonis was influenced by M. K. Čiurlionis. Later, when he learned of the Western European art, he was significantly influenced by German expressionist and Bauhaus school of art, and especially by Lyonel Feininger and his beams of light that were stylized, falling in many different directions, and forming fantastic images. When he lived in France, he was influenced by primitivism.

His mature creative period started in mid 1920s and lasted the end of 1930s. During this period, his works exhibit the growing tendency to divide things and space into geometric segments. The artist paid particular attention to light which divided geometric segments into small crystals. After World War II, his creativity started to fade and he returned to earlier themes. Sadness and recollections start appearing in his stylized fantasy works. During this period, he created more realistic landscapes and scenes of nature. He was criticized for imitation.

Notable works: "Foliage" (1923), "Towers" (1928), "Fantasy", "Thirst" (1926), "Forest Fire", "Princess", "Composition", "Lights" (1926), "In Fog" (1927), "Fantasy Landscape" (1930), "Candles" (1931), "Living Stones" (1935), "Landscape with Wayside Shrine", "Girl with Flowers" (1936), "Into The Space" (1958), "Breaking Morning" (1968). He also painted portraits of actors Ona Rymaitė, Unė Babickaitė, Teofilija Vaičiūnienė, writers Vydūnas, Vincas Mykolaitis-Putinas, Vincas Krėvė-Mickevičius, Juozas Tysliava, Liudas Gira, Kazys Binkis, historian Simonas Daukantas, artist M. K. Čiurlionis, and others.

== See also ==
- List of Lithuanian painters
- Official Website of Kazys Simonis
