= Mikutavičius =

Mikutavičius is the masculine form of a Lithuanian family name. Its feminine forms are: Mikutavičienė (married woman or widow) and Mikutavičiūtė (unmarried woman).

== Surname ==
The surname may refer to:

- Marijonas Mikutavičius (b. 1971) – singer, journalist
- Ričardas Mikutavičius (1935-1998) – Catholic priest, poet and art collectionist
- Jonas Mikutavičius – organist, choirmaster
- Juozas Mikutavičius – educator, conductor, choirmaster
