= Veidas =

1992–2017 weekly news magazine in Lithuania

- Editor in Chief: Gintaras Sarafinas
- Categories: News magazine
- Frequency: Weekly
- Circulation: 6,000
- Publisher: Algimantas Šindeikis
- Founded: 1992
- Final issue: 2017
- Company: Veido periodikos leidykla
- Country: Lithuania
- Based in: Vilnius
- Language: Lithuanian
- Website: Veidas
- ISSN: 1392-5156

Veidas (literally: face) was a weekly news magazine published in Lithuania from 1992 to 2017. It focused on the world news, politics and business.

== History and profile ==
Veidas started publishing in 1992. The magazine was published by Veido periodikos leidykla weekly on Thursdays and has its headquarters in Vilnius. The first editor-in-chief of the magazine was Aurelijus Katkevičius. It ceased publication in July 2017. The weekly "Veidas" was published by "Veido periodikas leidykla", which also publishes the magazines "Moters savaitalis", "Auto Bild Lietuva" and "Mažylis".

The magazine published an annual list of the richest Lithuanians.

== See also ==
- List of magazines in Lithuania
