= Aurelija Mikušauskaitė =

Lithuanian actress

Aurelija Mikušauskaitė (July 17, 1937 in Kaunas, Lithuania – January 2, 1974 in Vilnius) was a Lithuanian film, television and theatre actress.

== Biography ==
In 1951 Aurelija Mikušauskaitė entered Kaunas Medical School No.1 and in 1955 she graduated from this school having completed the full course of paramedics-obstetricians. In 1956 she entered the Lithuanian State Conservatory (presently the Lithuanian Academy of Music and Theatre) and in 1960 she graduated from the Conservatory with honours and was awarded the degree of Master of Arts in Theatre/ Drama (Acting). The 5th crop of drama actors 1956-1960: Vincas Aleknavičius, Henrikas Andriukonis, Milita Bazevičiūtė, Nijolė Gelžinytė, Eugenijus Ignatavičius, Vincenta Miežlaiškytė, Aurelija Mikušauskaitė, Algirdas Paukštaitis, Aleksandras Šimanskis, Bronius Talačka, Judita Ušinskaitė. The course was headed by Irena Vaišytė and Jonas Kavaliauskas.

Actress Aurelija Mikušauskaitė created her first role in a television studio. At that time she was still a very young graduate student of the Faculty of Theatre of the Lithuanian State Conservatory and she played the desire to live – the main character in the pageant of the well-known story "The Last Leaf" (LT: "Paskutinis lapas") by O. Henry. The director apparently not accidentally gave that role to Aurelija, knowing the great strength of her vitality, tenacity and temperament. In 1960 Aurelija Mikušauskaitė, after completing the Faculty of Theatre of the Lithuanian State Conservatory, together with all her course friends, went to work for the State Radio and Television Committee. There they created television theatre. Aurelia devoted all her resources and energy to the young muse of television. She played many larger and smaller roles in television theatre, "Clubs of Literary Heroes”. She was very fond of reading poetry. She also performed in radio theatre and for some time worked as TV announcer. In 1965 A. Mikušauskaitė started to work in the State Youth Theatre of Lithuania. However, while working there, she used to frequently visit TV and radio, participated in performances, broadcasts. Her last TV role was as Lala in A. Arbuzov’s play "The Choice" (LT: “Pasirinkimas”), which premiered in January 1973...

She was buried in the Panemunė cemetery in Kaunas.

== Roles in theatre ==
- “Twenty Years After” (LT: “Po dvidešimties metų“) by N. Svetlov
- (LT: “Apiplėšimas vidurnaktį”) by Miroslav Mitrovic. Director Z. Buožis
- “Peculiar Man” (LT: “Keistuolis“) by Nâzım Hikmet Ran
- 1966 “Du maži žmogiukai dideliam mieste” by M. Sluckis, V. Miliūnas. Director Aurelija Ragauskaitė
- 1967 “Look Back in Anger” (LT: “Atsigręžk rūstybėje“) by John Osborne. Director Vytautas Čibiras
- 1967 “Jeanne” (LT: “Žana“) by Jean Anouilh (Vyturys). Assistant director Antanas Šurna
- 1968 ”Rudė” by Radij Pogodin. Director Irena Bučienė
- 1968 “Aristocrats“ (LT: “Aristokratai”) by N. Pogodin. Director Aurelija Ragauskaitė
- 1968 “The Dragon” (LT: “Drakonas”) by E. Schwartz. Director Vytautas Čibiras
- 1968 “Aš vejuosi vasarą...” by Violeta Palčinskaitė. Director Aurelija Ragauskaitė
- 1970 “Nuo šeštadienio iki sekmadienio” by V. Rozov. Director Gintas Žilys
- 1970 “A White Sail Gleams” (LT: “Baltuoja burė tolumoj”) by Valentin Kataev. Director Vytautas Čibiras
- 1972 “Fire in Bosom” (LT: “Ugnis užantyje“) by G. Kanovičius. Director Gintas Žilys

== Roles in cinema ==
- 1961 “Strangers” (LT: “Svetimi“), Lithuanian Film Studios, director Marijonas Giedrys
- 1968 Feelings, Lithuanian Film Studios, directors Algirdas Dausa, Almantas Grikevičius
