= List of magazines in Lithuania =

The following is an incomplete list of current and defunct magazines published in Lithuania. They are published in Lithuanian or other languages.

== A ==
- Aidai

== C ==
- Centras

== I ==
- Iliustruotasis mokslas

== L ==
- Laima

== M ==
- Magazyn Wilenski
- Mūsų senovė

== N ==
- Namas ir aš
- Naujoji Romuva

== P ==
- Panelė
- Pergalė
- Pravda

== S ==
- SPO:)

== V ==
- Valstybė
- Veidas

== See also ==
List of newspapers in Lithuania
