= Trečias frontas =

Lithuanian literary magazine

Trečias frontas (transl. Third Front) was a short-lived Lithuanian literary magazine which was the official organ of the Trečiafrontininkai (Third Fronters) group. The magazine was preparing to publish its 6th and 7th issues however after the 5th issue, the magazine was banned by the Lithuanian authorities in 1931.

== Contributors ==
The initiator of the magazine and the ideologist of the program of its activism was Kazys Boruta, who lived in political exile. The editorial board of the magazine included: Bronys Raila, Jonas Šimkus and Antanas Venclova.

Among the prominent contributors of the magazine were Butkų Juzė, Petras Cvirka, Kazys Jakubėnas, Kostas Korsakas, and later contributors Valys Drazdauskas and Salomėja Nėris.

== Content ==
Gathered around the magazine, young writers of leftist and anti-fascist views, with socialist sentiments, formed a literary group of the Third Fronters. They considered themselves representatives of the third generation of writers, replacing the Lithuanian symbolists and the Keturi vėjai and criticized the official ideology of the state, clericalism as well as stagnation in the Lithuanian literary life.

In the beginning, the magazine promoted activism and the new creative method neorealism (in this case a synthesis of realism, expressionism and futurism). Kostas Korsakas played a major role in changing the direction of the magazine and the creative attitudes of the Third Front members, who in an affirmed the idea of the class character of literature and the need to serve the proletariat. Spontaneous rebellion and avant-garde experiments were replaced by radical ideologization, an orientation towards Marxist ideology and proletarian literature, a transition to political agitation and a realistic manner of writing.

A significant place in the journal was occupied by translations from foreign languages and information about foreign literary life, reflecting the search for like-minded people in other countries.
