= Keturi vėjai =

Lithuanian avant-garde literary movement and magazine

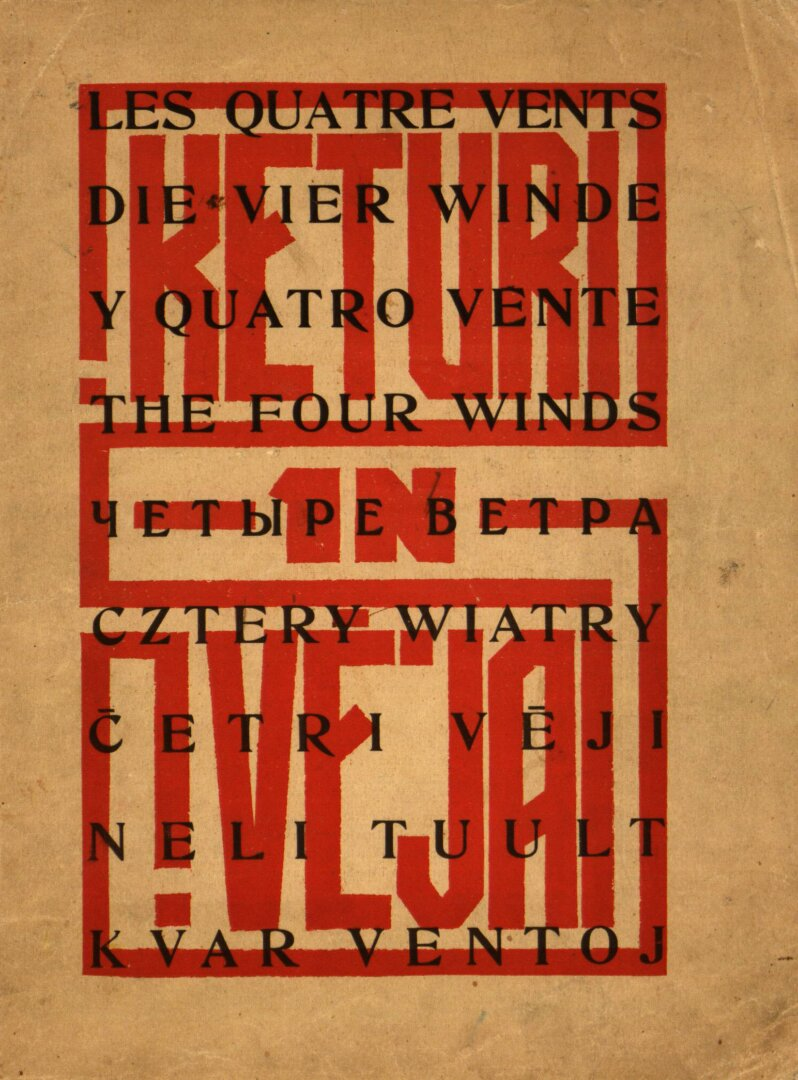
Cover of the Keturi vėjai magazine's first edition, 1924

Keturi vėjai (lit. 'The Four Winds') was a Lithuanian avant-garde literary movement and magazine active in the 1920s. Its followers were known as Keturvėjininkai.

The Keturi vėjai movement is considered to have begun with the publication of Kazys Binkis's and Salys Šemerys's expressionist texts in 1921. On 16 February 1922, with the publication of the manifesto Keturių vėjų pranašas (The Prophet of the Four Winds), Binkis wrote on the movement's values. The magazine was published from 1924 to 1928.

The theoretical basis of Keturi vėjai initially was futurism which arrived through Russia from the West, which was later was influenced by cubism, dadaism, surrealism, unanimism, and German expressionism. The most influential futurist for Lithuanian writers was Russian poet Vladimir Mayakovsky. It preached the approach to literature as a collective workshop, promoted a laboratory creative method, and emphasized the word and sound as independent aesthetic values. It sought to combine the cosmopolitan urban civilization and the archaic Lithuanian worldviews.

Poet Adomas Jakštas opposed and criticized the movement, calling it "childish play". Members of Keturi vėjai included founder Kazys Binkis, Augustinas Gricius, Petras Janeliūnas, Juozas Petrėnas, Bronys Raila, Salys Šemerys, Alfonas Šimėnas, Juozas Švaistas, Teofilis Tilvytis, Juozas Tysliava, Juozas Žlabys-Žengė, and others. Members of the closed movement would gather in Binkis's apartment and read their works. Although most of the movement's members were left-leaning, political content was not included in their magazines. The movement dispersed in the late 1920s, although it influenced the Trečiafrontininkai movement.
