= Aleksandras Gudaitis-Guzevičius =

Lithuanian Soviet writer (1908–1969)

- Born: 7 April 1908; Moscow, Russian Empire
- Died: 18 February 1969 (aged 60); Vilnius, Lithuanian SSR, Soviet Union
- Occupations: Writer, politician, NKVD officer

Aleksandras Gudaitis-Guzevičius (7 April 1908 – 18 February 1969) was a Lithuanian Soviet writer, statesman and NKVD officer.

== Biography ==
Gudaitis was born in Moscow into a working-class family. In 1921 he graduated from high school and moved with his family to Lithuania, where he studied at a gymnasium until 1925. From 1925 to 1931 he worked in the Komsomol, trade union organizations, and in the editorial office of the magazine Balsas (Voice) which was an organ of the illegal Communist Party of Lithuania. In October 1931, he was arrested for clandestine activities and remained in prison until 1938. From 1938 to 1939, he studied French language and literature at Vytautas Magnus University. In October 1939 he was arrested and exiled.

In June 1940, after the Soviet occupation of Lithuania, Gudaitis was appointed vice minister of the interior. In August 1940, he become the people's commissar of the interior (cf. NKVD) of the Lithuanian SSR. After the German invasion of the Soviet Union, Gudaitis retreated to Moscow and worked for the Soviet NKVD. After the Red Army re-took Lithuania in summer 1944, Gudaitis returned as chief of NKVD and worked to suppress anti-Soviet resistance. He was promoted to Major General of the NKVD in July 1945, but was judged not effective in his duties and dismissed from NKVD in August 1945.

From 1945 to 1947, he was the chairman of the Committee for Cultural and Educational Institutions under the Council of Ministers of the Lithuanian SSR. From 1947 to 1950 he worked as the director of the State Publishing House of Fiction and from 1945 to 1950 he was the director of the State Institute of Art and Culture of the Lithuanian SSR. He served as Minister of Culture of the Lithuanian SSR from 1953 to 1955. He was a member of the Lithuanian Writers' Union from 1955. In 1956 he graduated from the third year of the Maxim Gorky Literary Institute by correspondence.

Gudaitis was a member of the Central Committee of the Lithuanian Communist Party in 1940–1949 and 1952–1956. He was elected to the Supreme Soviet of the Lithuanian SSR in 1940–1947 and 1951–1955 as well as to the Supreme Soviet of the Soviet Union in 1941–1946 and 1954–1958.

Gudaitis-Guzevičius died on 18 April 1969. He was buried in Vilnius at the Antakalnis Cemetery.

== Awards ==
- Two Orders of Lenin (1954, 1964)
- Order of the Red Banner (1945)
- Order of the Red Banner of Labor
- Order of the Red Star (1943)
- People's Writer of the Lithuanian SSR (1968)
- Stalin Prize of the third degree (1951) - for the novel Kalvio Ignoto teisybė (1948-1949)
