= Vilnius pontoon bridge =

Former bridge in Vilnius, Lithuania

The Vilnius pontoon bridge was a pedestrian pontoon bridge built across the Neris river in Vilnius, Lithuania. It was a seasonal construction - it was assembled every spring and disassembled every winter by soldiers. It was built near the modern-day Mindaugas Bridge. After it collapsed in 1975, causing several deaths, it was not rebuilt again.

== History ==
From 1960 to 1965, an unpowered cable ferry carried pedestrians over the river. It cost 5 kopeks to use the ferry. The growth of the city meant that the ferry, which could carry twenty people, was inadequate. In 1971, the Vilnius Palace of Concerts and Sports was built, furthering the need for an alternative to the Vilnius Green Bridge. A pontoon bridge was seen as a faster and more direct alternative for a larger flow of people returning from entertainment events from Žirmūnai to the Vilnius Old Town.

== 1975 accident ==
1975 Vilnius pontoon bridge accident

Details
- Date: 13 April 1975; 22:30
- Location: Vilnius
- Coordinates: 54.6892°N 25.2875°E
- Country: Soviet-occupied Lithuania
- Incident type: Collapse
- Cause: Building not finished in time; no cautionary fences

Statistics
- Deaths: 4 (believed to be more)
- Injured: 31 (believed to be more)

The pontoon bridge was laid in the spring of 1975, as was the custom. Although construction was scheduled to run from 7 to 11 April, it took longer than expected due to the river's spring flood.

On 13 April, the Hungarian musical ensemble Syrius performed at the Palace of Concerts and Sports, dedicated to the 30th anniversary of Hungary's liberation from Fascism by the USSR. Foreign artists performing inside the Soviet Union was rare, so the concert was well attended.

At around 10 p.m., after the end of the show, a crowd of people chose a quicker route back via the Vilnius Cathedral across the pontoon bridge, which was not yet open to the public. The bridge was not fenced-off, and people began climbing onto it and throwing away warning signs. With around 300 people on the bridge, one end detached from the bank. The loose section was moved by the current and individual pontoons began sinking. A number of people, wearing heavy winter clothing, fell into the icy water. Others clung to bridge sections until they were rescued.

Most of those thrown into the river were able to scramble to land, or were rescued by others, as official responders were slow to arrive. Several people died, with the last body found in early May.

=== Aftermath ===
The incident occurred shortly after the Žasliai railway disaster, and authorities of the Lithuanian Soviet Socialist Republic were hesitant to admit it officially. Censored newspapers either delayed reporting the accident, or downplayed it. A group of citizens, frustrated by the inactivity of the government, wrote a letter to a popular newspaper known to sometimes cross ideological norms. The newspaper did not publish about the incident, but the letter was passed to the prosecutor's office. Two senior members of the construction team were subsequently imprisoned for a couple of years.

Officially four deaths and thirty-one injuries were recorded, but this may have been downplayed due to state censorship, with the actual death count being much higher. In an official verdict, 1,963 rubles were given to people who experienced material losses. The location of the incident does not have a commemorative plaque.

The incident was mentioned in Ričardas Gavelis's novel Jaunojo žmogaus memuarai.
