= Vytautas Augustauskas =

Vytautas Augustauskas-Augustaitis
- Born: April 9, 1904; Lygumai, Šiauliai County, Lithuania
- Died: June 27, 1958 (aged 54); Kaunas, Lithuania SSR
- Resting place: Petrašiūnai Cemetery
- Education: Vytautas Magnus University
- Occupations: Physical education and sports, educator

Vytautas Augustauskas-Augustaitis (since 1939 Augustaitis; April 9, 1904 – June 27, 1958) was a Lithuanian educator, scientist, sports organizer, and one of the Lithuanian physical education system creators.
