= People's Poet =

People's Poet may refer to:

- People's Poet of Azerbaijan
- People's Writer (Poet) of the Republic of Dagestan
- People's Poet of the Lithuanian SSR
- People's Poet of Uzbekistan

== See also ==
- People's Writer
