= Anthill in Prussia =

1989 novel by Juozas Aputis

- Author: Juozas Aputis
- Language: Lithuanian
- Genre: Literary fiction; Literary realism; Magical realism
- Set in: Lithuania, Prussia
- Publisher: Vaga Publishers
- Publication date: 1989, Vilnius
- Publication place: Lithuania

Anthill in Prussia (Lithuanian: Skruzdėlynas Prūsijoje) is a novella by writer Juozas Aputis. Although he began writing it in 1967, due to Soviet censorship, the book was not published until 1989. It is one of his most famous and important works, described as "one of the most prominent phenomenon of national prose", allegorically covering themes such as existential anxiety, an individual's relationship with history, as well as the persistence of humanity and resistance to violence during times of rationality and irrationality.

The 1989 edition contains two short stories in the same book. One of them, Vargonų balsas skalbykloje (The Organs' Voice in the Washing Room), which first appeared in the Nemunas magazine in 1988 but was written over the previous ten years during Aputis' most challenging creative period, covers young people's initial youthfulness turned into compromise which deprives them of a full life, in which a multi-perspective narrative reminds of improvisation on the organ. The story includes the contraposition of youthful maximalism and the conformism of the Era of Stagnation, and retells the story of three people – a famous organist, a high-ranking official, and his wife. The second story, Skruzdėlynas Prūsijoje (literally, an Anthill in Prussia), is an allegorical retelling of a man and a woman who, devoting themselves to an ascetic lifestyle, retreat into the wilderness of Prussia. Aputis commented that the premise of the book came to him from a dream, in which you could only protest against the spiritual disorder of the USSR in the manner he described. Because of that, the story contains many fantastical and metaphorical elements. The story also delves into the fate of the Baltic Prussians, tying them with modern-day Balts of Lithuania and Latvia.

== See also ==
- Lithuanian literature
- Occupation of the Baltic states
