= Juozas Grušas =

Lithuanian writer (1901–1986)

Juozas Grušas (November 16, 1901, Žadžiūnai-Kalniškiai, Kovno Governorate – May 21, 1986, Kaunas) was a Lithuanian writer, editor, dramatist and playwright.

== Biography ==
Grušas' first inspirational teacher was the Lithuanian poet Jovaras, who taught him writing and spurred his interest in literature. In 1920 he enrolled at the Šiauliai Gymnasium, graduating in 1924.

From 1924 to 1931 he was a student at the University of Lithuania (1930 renamed to Vytautas Magnus University), in the Theology-philosophy faculty. In 1928 he was elected as chairman of the student organization Šatrija. After graduating in 1930, he began teaching the Lithuanian language. In 1931, together with Balys Sruoga, he co-founded the Lithuanian writers association; from 1937 to 1938 he was chairman of this organization. Grušas served as editor-in-chief of the Christian weekly newspaper Mūsų laikraštis (Our Newspaper) from 1928 to 1938. In 1935 he published a satirical novel, Karjeristai (The Careerists), which has been described as "one of the key works in the history of the Lithuanian novel".

He was interested in Lithuanian and Baltic history and several of his drama plays are about historic characters of the past.

From 1940 to 1941 he worked in the State publishing house as an editor of fiction. He fell ill in 1941, and lived with his in-laws in Joniškis until 1949. In 1948 he was accepted into the Lithuanian SSR writers association. After returning to Kaunas in 1949, he resumed writing, and over time became one of the most productive Lithuanian playwrights. His works have been translated into English, Polish, Latvian, and Estonian. Juozas Grušas was buried in Petrašiūnai Cemetery. Juozas Grušas Secondary School (in Šilainiai elderate of Kaunas) was named in his honour.

== Important works ==
Books:

- Ponia Bertulienė, 1925
- Karjeristai (novel), 1935

Dramas:

- Dūmai (Smalkės, 1956)
- Herkus Mantas (1957)
- Švitrigaila (1975)
- Unija (1977)
- Gintarinė vila (1979)
- Meilė, džiazas ir velnias (1967)
- Barbora Radvilaitė (1972)

Most of his plays were produced in the Kaunas State Drama Theatre.

Collected works:

- Raštai, 5 volumes in 1981–1985
- Mykolas Glinskis, 1984
- Gyvų sienojų namai, 1986

== Awards ==
He received awards for Herkus Mantas in 1957, and for Švitrigaila, Barbora Radvilaitė and Pijus nebuvo protingas in 1976.

He was named the Honorary Artist of the Lithuanian SSR in 1976 and the People's Writer of the Lithuanian SSR in 1971.

His 1972 play Barbora Radvilaitė was selected as one of the Lithuanian plays of the century.
