= Ričardas Mikutavičius =

Lithuanian writer

Ričardas Mikutavičius (February 26, 1935 – July 1, 1998) was a Lithuanian priest, Doctor of Theology, poet, and one of the most famous collectors of art in Lithuania.

He attended the 15th Kaunas elementary school and the 4th boy's gymnasium. In 1953 he entered Kaunas Priest Seminary and became a priest in 1958. He had been a member of the Union of Lithuanian writers since 1992. He was awarded the 3rd class Order of the Lithuanian Grand Duke Gediminas in 1993.

Mikutavičius was killed on June 30, 1998 during a robbery of his painting collection. His body was tossed into the Nemunas River and he was later buried in Petrašiūnai cemetery. Three defendants subsequently confessed to the murder and pointed to a fourth defendant as the mastermind of the crime. On November 29, 2001 a monument for his honour was built. Eighteen paintings from his collections are still missing. Seventeen paintings that were found were shown to the public during a special exhibition dedicated to his 70th birthday in 2005.

== Literary works ==
Although the fact that Mikutavičius was a poet and essayist was known, he didn't publish any of his poetry until the Sąjūdis times. In 1989 he introduced his first book "Kad Lietuva neišsivaikščiotų" in the Town Hall of Kaunas. Other books, "Poterių upė" (River of Prayers), "Šviesos spalvos" (Colours of Light), "Žaizdos metafizika" (Metaphysics of Injury), "Spindintis virš mūsų" (Shining above Us) and "Mirties vilties veidai" (Death's Hope's Faces), were published in 1990, 1992, 1995, 1998 and 1999 respectively.
