= Mykolas Sluckis =

Lithuanian writer

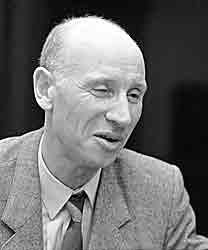
- Sluckis in 1987
- Born: 20 October 1928; Panevėžys, Lithuania
- Died: February 25, 2013 (aged 84)
- Citizenship: Lithuania
- Occupation: Writer
- Writing career
- Notable work: Laiptai į dangų

Mykolas Sluckis (October 20, 1928 – February 25, 2013) was a Lithuanian writer.

He was among the very few Lithuanian Jewish writers who wrote in Lithuanian.

== Biography ==
Sluckis was born in Panevėžys family of a poor craftsman, Gecelis (Hetzel) Sluckis. In the Soviet Union his full name in Russian was given as "Миколас Гецелевич Слуцкис". During World War II, in summer 1941 (when Lithuania was under Soviet occupation) he was evacuated from the Soviet Young Pioneer camp in Palanga and lived in a rural orphanage in Russia, in Malmyzhsky District of the Kirov Oblast. In Winter 1944 he, with many other children, was returned to Vilnius. His parents and brother were killed in Holocaust, only he and his younger sister survived. In 1951, he graduated from the history and philology department of Vilnius University majoring in Russian philology.

At the age of 20, he married to Regina née Važgauskaitė and they had daughter Snieguole.

== Works ==
Among other works, Sluckis wrote some 20 books for children and youth, mostly in his early years. He also wrote essays of literary criticism, plays and screenplays.

His novel Laiptai į dangų ("Stairway to Heaven") served as a base for the 1966 award-winning film with the same name (Laiptai į dangų at IMDb).

His short story Svetimos aistros ("Strangers' Passions") served as a base for the 1983 Latvian film Svešās kaislības (Svešās kaislības at IMDb).

His works have been translated into 25 languages.

== Awards and decorations ==
- 2004: Officer's Cross of the Order of Vytautas the Great
- 1987: Petras Cvirka Prize for the book Medžliepis ("Linden Tree")
- 1984: Honorary title of People's Writer of the Lithuanian SSR
- 1972: Žemaitė Literary Prize for the book Merginų sekmadienis ("Girls' Sunday")
- 1966: Lithuanian SSR State Prize for the short story collection Žingsniai ("Steps")
