= Pulgis Andriušis =

Lithuanian writer (1907–1970)

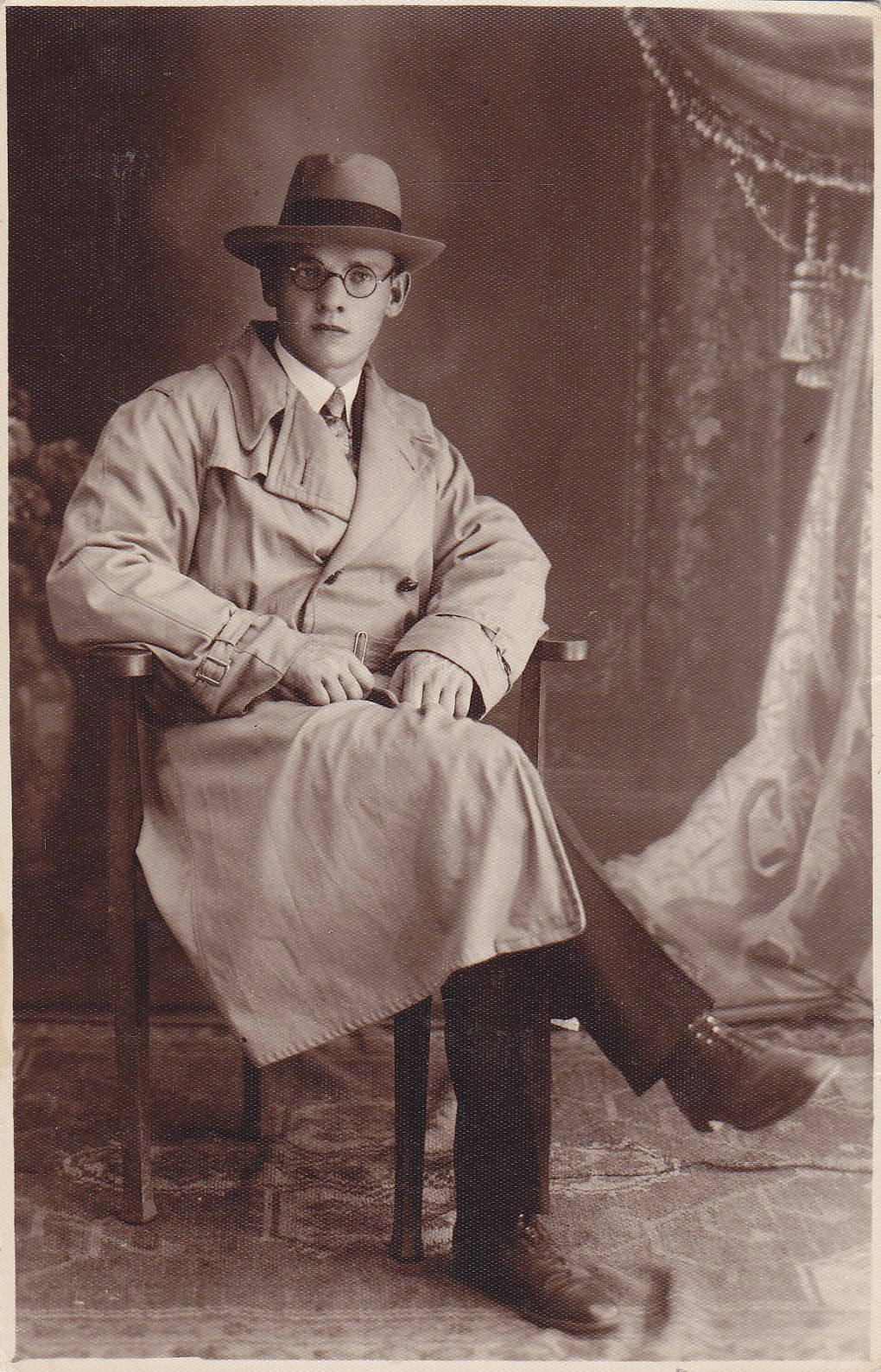
- Born: Fulgencijus Andrusevičius; 31 March 1907; Gaidžiai, Kovno Governorate, Russian Empire
- Died: 19 December 1970 (aged 63); Adelaide, Australia
- Education: Vytautas Magnus University
- Occupations: Writer, publicist, translator, journalist

Pulgis Andriušis (born Fulgencijus Andrusevičius; 31 March 1907 – 19 December 1970) was a Lithuanian writer, translator and journalist.

== Biography ==
Pulgis Andriušis was born on 31 March 1907 in the village of Gaidžiai, which belonged to the Kovno Governorate of the Russian Empire. He attended the Utena "Saulė" Gymnasium where he graduated from five grades. Later he began attending the Kaunas "Aušra" Gymnasium. In the Gymnasium, he began publishing a caricature newspaper entitled Šepseliada. Both in literary form and in subject matter, which concerned the topic of teachers, it was an exceptional publication in the school's history. A total of three issues were made, with Andriušis illustrating all of them. Although Andriušis was mocking his teachers and the phenomena of everyday life at the gymnasium, when moving from the seventh grade to the eighth grade, the math teacher A. Račiukaitis gave the student a failing grade which would have required him to stay in the seventh grade to repeat the course. With the mediation of the director of the gymnasium Mykolas Biržiška, the grade was corrected and the condition that Andriušis would leave the gymnasium and transfer to another school. The second and third part of Šepseliada was published while he was still studying at the adult gymnasium of the Kaunas Trade Union of Teachers, but the newspaper continued to be distributed at the "Aušra" Gymnasium. After graduating in 1926, Andriušis began writing humoristic stories based on village life. From 1927 to 1930 he studied at the Kaunas School of Arts, but did not graduate from it, and instead chose to study the Lithuanian language at Vytautas Magnus University. He also studied natural sciences, English studies, and theater studies. Balys Sruoga, who was a professor at the university, suggested Andriušis adopt the pseudonym Pulgis. A polyglot, Andriušis spoke 10 languages, including Esperanto, as well as German, French, Italian, Spanish, Portuguese, Swedish, and Arabic. He also wrote on the topic of theater.

In 1928, having gotten permission from President Antanas Smetona to travel, Andriušis visited numerous countries, including Great Britain, France, Italy, Spain, and Morocco. He graduated in 1932. It was at this point that he began to translate the works of Miguel de Cervantes. From 1931 to 1934 Andriušis acted in the Stedra theater founded by Balys Sruoga. From 1934 to 1939 he worked on various newspapers in Kaunas and Klaipėda. In total, Andriušis published a few thousand articles, feuilletons, literary and theater reviews, travel logs, and popular descriptions of nature. In 1938 he married Marija Chodauskaitė, with whom he had two sons and two daughters. He translated various books, including Roland Dorgelès's Wooden Crosses, and most famously, both parts of Cervantes's Don Quixote in 1942.

Andriušis fled Lithuania in 1944 to Tübingen, Germany. Life in the German refugee camps was humorously depicted in collections of feuilletons. He actively participated in Lithuanian émigré movements intent on re-establishing the Lithuanian Writers Society in exile, which they officially did in 1946. In 1947 he published an Esperanto textbook and dictionary. He moved to Sydney, Australia, in 1949. After working as a railway wagon cleaner for two years, Andriušis settled in Adelaide, where he worked as a train conductor and assistant telegraph operator. He died in the city on 19 December 1970.

== Writing ==
Andriušis's works are characterized by anecdotal situations and mockery, as well as a person's relationship with nature. Literary critic Algis Samulionis described Andriušis's works as "<...> the nature of the pre-war highlands village and the household of a person closely related to it, their authentic spiritual world is realistically recreated down to the smallest details. <...> The storytelling is characterized by painterliness, vividness of details, abundance and importance of landscapes, extremely colorful highland lexicon, and rhythmic phrase." For his story Sudiev, kvietkeli! Andriušis was awarded 1,500 dollars.

== Bibliography ==
=== Fiction ===
- Ir vis dėlto juokimės! (1946)
- Snaudalis dirvonėlyje (1946)
- Siuntinėlis iš Amerikos. Antroji tremties humoro knyga (1947)
- Baimės naktys (1947)
- Grįžk į Sorento (1947)
- Neįleido (1947)
- Santa Lucia (1947)
- Anoj pusėj ežero (1947)
- Vabalų vestuvės (1948)
- Laivas linksmybių (1950)
- Tipelis (1951)
- Sudiev, kvietkeli! (1951)
- Rojaus vartai (1960)
- Daina iš kito galo (1962)
- Purienos po vandeniu (1963)

=== Non-fiction ===
- Esperanto kalbos vadovėlis su trumpu žodynėliu (1947)
- Ispanų kalbos gramatika (1947)
- Blezdingėlės prie Torenso: Lietuvių įsikūrimas Pietų Australijoje 1947–1962 m.
- Septinton įleidus (1952)
- Rinktiniai raštai t. 1. (1968)
