= Petrašiūnai Cemetery =

Cemetery in Kaunas, Lithuania

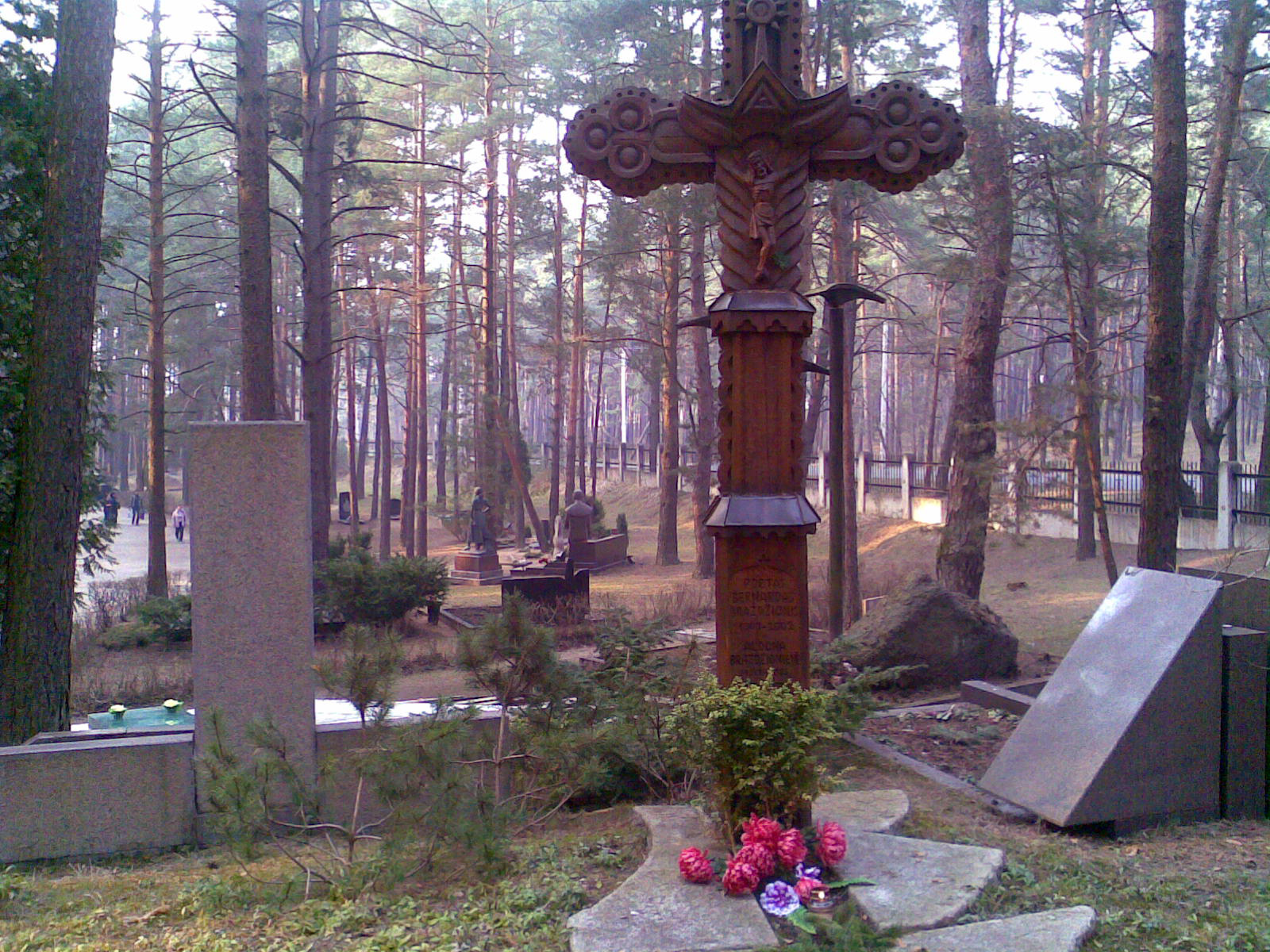
- A traditional cross at Petrašiūnai Cemetery (Grave of Bernardas Brazdžionis)
- Address: M. Gimbutienės g. 28 (street)
- Location: Kaunas, Lithuania
- Coordinates: 54°53′16″N 24°00′31″E
- Type: National cemetery

Construction
- Built: 1939–1940
- Opened: 1941
- Renovated: 2010
- Expanded: 1955–1961

Petrašiūnai Cemetery (Lithuanian: Petrašiūnų kapinės) is Lithuania's premiere last resting place formally designated for graves of people influential in national history, politics, arts, and science.

== Location ==
Petrašiūnai Cemetery is located about 6 miles (9.7 km) south-east of the center of Kaunas, Lithuania. It covers over 22 acres (8.9 ha) in a quiet area of a peninsula formed by the Neman River where its bend was widened by Kaunas Reservoir. Its name, Lithuanian: Petrašiūnų ("of Petrašiūnai"), is based on Petrašiūnai, the borough of the City of Kaunas where it is placed.

== History ==
The construction of the cemetery began by the end of 1939, burials started in 1941, it was periodically expanded in the late 1950s and needed substantial restoration after the gale of 6 August 2010. The options for a burial at the cemetery have been formally restricted since 1972, the authorities designated it as the location where prominent people of Lithuania are buried, the last resting place of accomplished scientists, writers, artists, and politicians.

== Notable graves ==
- Vytautas Augustauskas, educator, scientist, sports organizer
- Saliamonas Banaitis, printer, educator, and banker; a signer of the Act of Independence of Lithuania
- Bernardas Brazdžionis, poet
- Kazys Binkis, poet
- Leonas Bistras, Lithuanian Prime Minister, translator, philosopher, professor
- Kazimieras Būga, philologist
- Vladimiras Dubeneckis, architect, painter
- Paulius Galaunė, art historian, museum curator, and graphic artist
- Marija Gimbutas, archeologist
- Algirdas Julius Greimas, philosopher, semiotician
- Juozas Gruodis, composer
- Juozas Grušas, Lithuanian playwright, writer, editor, and dramatist
- Jonas Jablonskis, philologist
- Kazimieras Jaunius, linguist
- Steponas Kairys, politician, engineer
- Petras Kalpokas, painter
- Petras Klimas, diplomat, historian, a signer of the Act of Independence of Lithuania
- Sofija Kymantaitė-Čiurlionienė, writer, literary critic
- Marija Lastauskienė, writer
- Kazys Lozoraitis, diplomat
- Stasys Lozoraitis, diplomat, Foreign Minister of Lithuania from 1934 until 1938.
- Stasys Lozoraitis Jr. Jr., diplomat
- Algimantas Masiulis, actor
- Antanas Merkys (symbolic tombstone), Prime Minister
- Ričardas Mikutavičius, priest, theologian, poet
- Salomėja Nėris, poet
- Stasys Raštikis, General of the Lithuanian Army
- Petras Rimša, Lithuanian sculptor and medalist
- Česlovas Sasnauskas, composer, organist
- Kazys Šimonis, painter
- Kazys Škirpa, Lithuanian military officer and diplomat
- Jonas Semaška, Lithuanian military officer
- Mykolas Sleževičius, Lithuanian Prime Minister, lawyer
- Algirdas Šocikas, Lithuanian boxer
- Aleksandras Štromas, lawyer
- Ričardas Tamulis, boxer
- Romualdas Tumpa, actor
- Juozas Urbšys, diplomat
- Juozas Zikaras, sculptor
- Antanas Žmuidzinavičius, painter

== See also ==
- List of cemeteries in Lithuania
