= People's Writer =

People's Writer is an honorary title to distinguished writers.

The title originated in the Soviet Union and was granted by the Republics of the Soviet Union and the Autonomous Soviet Socialist Republics. Some post-Soviet states continue granting this type of award.

- People's Writer of Azerbaijan
- People's Writer of Bashkortostan
- People's Writer of Belarus
- People's Writer of the Kazakh SSR
- People's Writer of the Kyrgyz Republic
- People's Writer of the Latvian SSR
- People's Writer of the Lithuanian SSR
- People's Writer of the Mari El Republic
- People's Writer (Poet) of the Republic of Dagestan
- People's Writer of the Republic of Tatarstan
- People's Writer of the Republic of Dagestan
- People's Writer of the Chuvash Republic
- People's Writer of the Estonian SSR

== See also ==
- People's Poet
