= Salomėja Nėris =

Lithuanian writer

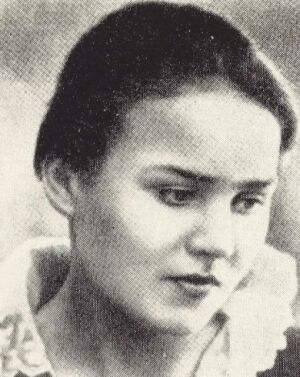
- Born: November 17, 1904; Kiršai, Alvitas County, Suwałki Governorate, Russian Empire (in modern Lithuania)
- Died: 7 July 1945 (aged 40); Moscow, Russian SFSR, USSR
- Resting place: Petrašiūnai Cemetery, Kaunas, Lithuania
- Occupations: Poet, teacher
- Spouse: Bernardas Bučas
- Children: 1
- Writing career
- Language: Lithuanian
- Years active: c. 1921–1945

Salomėja Bačinskaitė-Bučienė, mostly known by her pen name Nėris (Lithuanian pronunciation: [sɐɫɔˈmeːjɐ neːˈrɪs]; 17 November 1904 – 7 July 1945) was a Lithuanian poet.

== Biography ==
Salomėja was born in Kiršai, Suwałki Governorate (current district of Vilkaviškis). She graduated from the University of Lithuania where she studied Lithuanian and German language and literature.

After she was a teacher in Lazdijai, Kaunas, and Panevėžys, her first collection of poems titled Anksti rytą (In the Early Morning), was published in 1927.

In 1928, Salomėja graduated from the university and was appointed to teach German language at the gymnasium of the Žiburys Society in Lazdijai. Until 1931, Nėris contributed to nationalist and Roman Catholic publications. While studying German in Vienna, in 1929, Salomėja met Lithuanian medical student Bronius Zubrickas and became attracted to him. Zubrickas had socialist views and Salomėja engaged in socialist activities in order to court him.

In 1931, Salomėja moved to live in Kaunas, where she gave lessons and edited Lithuanian folk tales. In the second collection of Salomėja's poetry, Pėdos smėly (The Footprints in the Sand), there is evidence of the onset of a profound spiritual crisis. In the same year, verses containing revolutionary motifs were published in the pro-communist literary journal Trečias frontas (The Third Front).

A promise to work for communism was also published. However, it was not written by her. It was written by the chief ideological editor of Trečias frontas, Kostas Korsakas, and communist activist Valys Drazdauskas (Salomėja was more interested in writing poetry than in declarations, politics and theories about art).

Salomėja Nėris was awarded the State Literature Prize in 1938. She was a member of the Catholic youth and student organization Ateitis.

=== Activities during the Soviet occupation ===
Controversy surrounds her involvement with the Soviet occupation. She was appointed as a deputy to the Soviet-backed People's Seimas and was a member of the delegation to the Supreme Soviet of the Soviet Union to request Lithuania be accepted into the Soviet Union.

Salomėja was requested to write a poem in honour of Stalin and was subsequently awarded the Stalin Prize (posthumously, in 1947). After that, she wrote more verses on the theme, as encouraged by the Soviet Communist Party officials. She spent World War II in the Russian SFSR.

Salomėja Nėris returned to Kaunas but was diagnosed and died of liver cancer in a Moscow hospital in 1945. Her last poems show deep affection for Lithuania itself. She was buried in Kaunas, in a square of the Museum of Culture, and later re-interred in the Cemetery of Petrašiūnai.

== Pseudonym ==
Her original pen name was Neris, the name of the second biggest Lithuanian river. In 1940, she received a letter from her students calling her a traitor to her homeland and asking her not to use the name of the River Neris. She added a grave accent to the "e" and used only the pen name Nėris, which until then had no particular meaning.

== Works ==
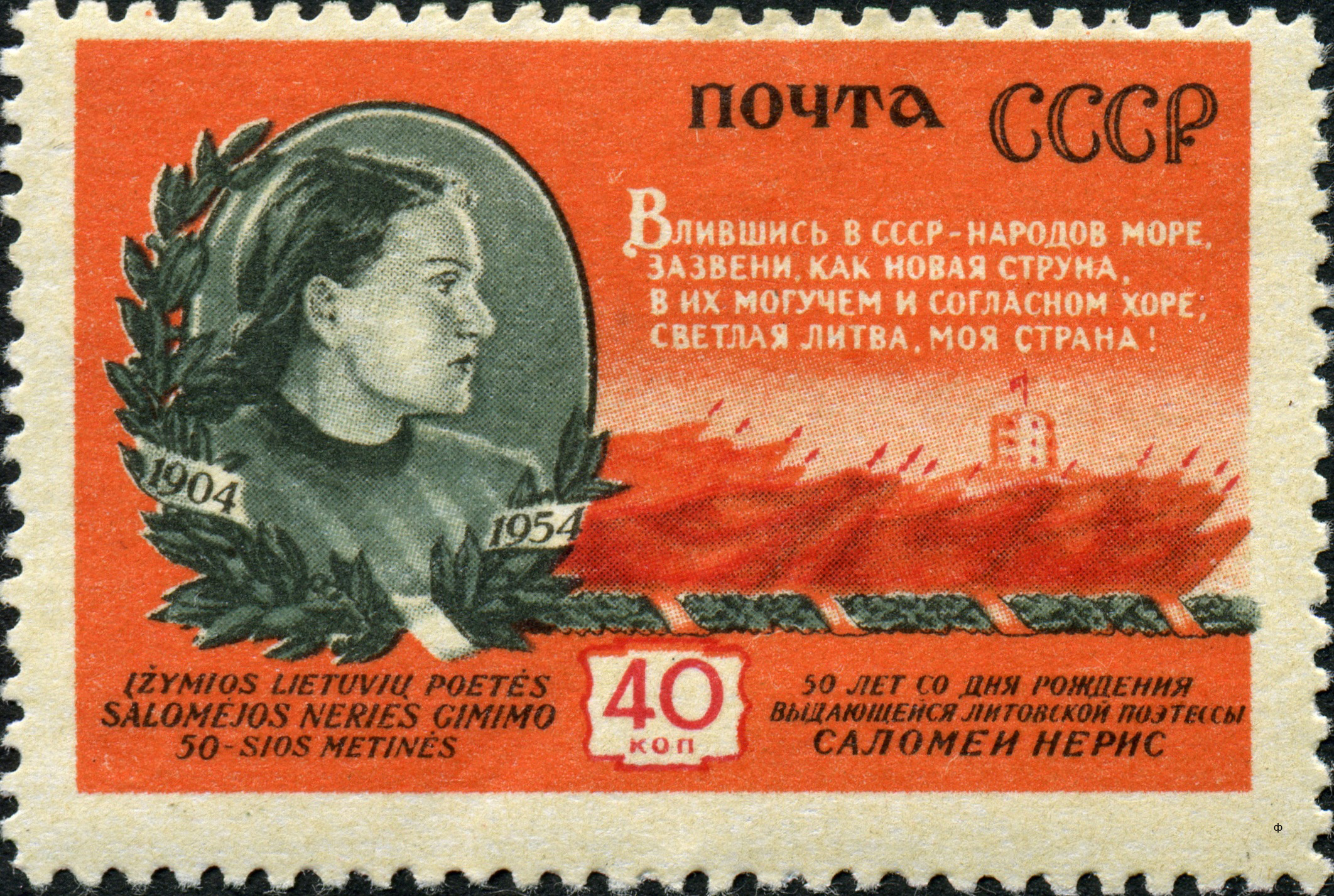
Neris commemorated on a 1954 Soviet stamp

- Pėdos smėly. – Kaunas: Sakalas, 1931. – 61p.
- Per lūžtantį ledą. – Kaunas: Sakalas, 1931. – 48p.
- Mūsų pasakos / sp. paruošė S.Nėris. – Kaunas: Spindulys, 1934. – 160p.
- Per lūžtantį ledą. – [Kaunas]: Sakalas, [1935]. – 48p.
- Diemedžiu žydėsiu. – Kaunas: Sakalas, 1938. – 69p.
- Eglė žalčių karalienė. – Kaunas: Valst. l-kla, 1940. – 107p.
- Poema apie Staliną. – Kaunas: Spaudos fondas, 1940. – 16p.
- Rinktinė. – Kaunas: Valst. l-kla, 1941. – 192p.
- Dainuok, širdie gyvenimą: eilėraščiai ir poemos. – Kaunas: Valst. l-kla, 1943. – 39p.
- Lakštingala negali nečiulbėti. – Kaunas: Valst. grož. lit. l-kla, 1945. – 109p.
- Eglė žalčių karalienė. – [Kaunas]: Valst. grož. lit. l-kla, 1946. – 96p.
- Poezija: [2t.]. – Kaunas: Valst. grož. lit. l-kla, 1946.
- Našlaitė. – Kaunas: Valst. grož. lit. l-kla, 1947. – 48p.
- Žalčio pasaka. – Chicago, 1947. – 112p.
- Rinktinė. – Vilnius: Valst. grož. lit. l-kla, 1950. – 276p.
- Eilėraščiai. – Vilnius: Valst. grož. lit. l-kla, 1951. – 84p.
- Poema apie Staliną. – Vilnius: Valst. grož. lit. l-kla, 1951. – 36p.
- Pavasario daina. – Vilnius: Valst. grož. lit. l-kla, 1953. – 38p.
- Poezija. – Vilnius: Valst. grož. lit. l-kla, 1954. – 500p.
- Baltais takeliais bėga saulytė. – Vilnius: Valst. grož. lit. l-kla, 1956. – 164p.
- Raštai: trys tomai. – [Vilnius]: Valst. grož. lit. l-kla, 1957.
- Rinktinė. – Kaunas: Valstybinė pedagoginės literatūros leidykla, 1958. – 112p. – (Mokinio biblioteka).
- Širdis mana - audrų daina. – Vilnius: Valst. grož. lit. l-kla, 1959. – 474p.
- Eglė žalčių karalienė: poema pasaka. – Vilnius: Valst. grož. lit. l-kla, 1961. – 51p.
- Pavasaris per kalnus eina: eilėraščiai. – Vilnius: Valstybinė grožinės literatūros leidykla, 1961. – 511p.
- Biała ścieżka. – Warszaw: Państ. inst. wydawniczy, 1963. – 34p. – in Polish
- Kur baltas miestas: rinktinė. – Vilnius: Vaga, 1964. – 143p.
- Rinktinė. – Kaunas: Šviesa, 1965. – 90p. – (Mokinio biblioteka).
- Laumės dovanos. – Vilnius: Vaga, 1966. – 25 p.
- Poezija: 2t. – Vilnius: Vaga, 1966
- Keturi: poem. – Vilnius: Vaga, 1967.
- U rodnika. – Vilnius: Vaga, 1967. – in Russian
- Lirika. – Moscow: Chudožestvennaja literatura, 1971. – 230p. – in Russian
- Poezija. – Vilnius: Vaga, 1972. – 2 volumes
- Negesk žiburėli. – Vilnius: Vaga, 1973. – 151p.
- Egle - zalkšu karaliene: poēma, translation by Daina Avotiņa. – Rīga: Liesma, 1974. – 58p. – in Latvian
- Širdis mana - audrų daina. – Vilnius: Vaga, 1974. – 477p.
- Kaip žydėjimas vyšnios: poezijos rinktinė. – Vilnius: Vaga, 1978. – 469p.
- Poezija: rinktinė. – Vilnius: Vaga, 1979. – 827p.
- Veter novych dnej: stichotvorenija. – Moscow: Chudožestvennaja literatura, 1979. – 334p. – in Russian
- Mama! Kur tu?: poem. – Vilnius: Vaga, 1980. – 38p.
- Nemunėliai plauks. – Vilnius: Vaga, 1980. – 201p.
- Negesk, žiburėli: eilėraščiai ir poemos. – Vilnius: Vaga, 1983. – 103p.
- Nedziesti, gaismeklīt. – Rīga: Liesma, 1984. – 129p. – in Latvian
- Raštai: 3 volumes – Vilnius: Vaga, 1984.
- Blue sister, river Vilija = sesuo Žydrioji - Vilija = Sestra Golubaja - Vilija. – Moscow: Raduga, 1987. – 261p. – in English and Russian
- Solovej ne petj ne možet: stichi. – Vilnius: Vaga, 1988. – 160p. – (Litovskaja poezija). – in Russian
- Egle, koroleva užei: poem, translation by M. Petrov. – Vilnius: Vyturys, 1989. – 62p. – in Russian
- Wiersze wybrane, translation by M. Stempkowska. – Kaunas: Šviesa, 1989. – 221p. – in Polish
- Prie didelio kelio: eilėraščiai. – Vilnius: Lietuvos rašytojų s-gos l-kla, 1994. – 96p.
- Tik ateini ir nueini: rinktinė. – Vilnius: Alma littera, 1995. – 220p.
- Eglė žalčių karalienė. – Vilnius: Lietus, 1998. – 126p.
