= Juozas Baltušis =

Soviet Lithuanian writer and public figure

- Born: 27 April 1909; Riga, Russian Empire
- Died: 4 February 1991 (aged 81); Vilnius, Lithuania
- Resting place: Antakalnis Cemetery, Vilnius, Lithuania
- Occupations: Writer, political figure
- Years active: 1932–1991

Albertas Juozėnas, mostly known by his pseudonym Juozas Baltušis (27 April [O.S. 14 April] 1909 – 4 February 1991) was a Soviet Lithuanian writer, radio and press operative and public figure. A popular author in Lithuania, albeit with a strong Soviet identity, among his best known works are the 1947 play Gieda gaideliai (The Cocks Are Crowing), the novel Parduotos vasaros (Sold-out Summers), first published in two volumes in 1957 and 1969 and Sakmė apie Juzą (The Tale of Juzas), a 1979 universal piece of literature which won the Lithuanian SSR State Prize and the Prix du Meilleur Livre Étranger (French literary prize). From 1946 to 1954 he was the secretary of the party organization of the Lithuanian Writers' Union and from 1946 to 1954 and then 1958 until 1962 he worked as the editor-in-chief of the literary magazine Pergalė (Victory). He was the deputy of the Supreme Council of the Lithuanian SSR for several decades.

== Early life and work ==
He was born into a peasant family in 1909, the son of Karolis Juozėnas (1871–1934) from Bitėnai and Marijona Baltušytė-Juozėnienė (1883–1964) from Puponiai in Kupiškis District. His sister, Marijona Juozėnaitė (1906–1997), became a nun and his brother, Leonardas Juozėnas (born 1914) was a military pilot and author. On 19 April 1909 Juozas was baptized in the Riga Catholic Church of St. Albert. During World I, the family moved east and lived in the Russian cities of Moscow, Nizhny Novgorod, and Tsaritsky (Volgograd). In 1918, the family settled in Puponiai, Kupiškis District.

Baltušis grew up in Puponiai until leaving the family home in 1929 and moving to live in Kaunas, where he found work in various printing houses as a messenger and letter collector. Baltušis began to have works published in 1932, seeking inspiration from the writer Kazys Boruta. His first work was entitled Darbas (Work), a collection of short stories. He began to write humorous plays during the 1930s, and he published short story collections such as The Week Begins Well (1940) and White Clover (1943).

== World War II and organizational positions ==
During World War II he moved to the Soviet Union, where he worked on the Radio Committee in Moscow from 1942 to 1944. From 1944 to 1946 he was the chairman of the Lithuanian Radio Committee and from 1946 to 1954 he was the secretary of the party organization of the Lithuanian Writers' Union. From 1946 to 1954 and then 1958 until 1962 he worked as the editor-in-chief of the literary magazine Pergalė and also served as the chairman of the organizational office of the Lithuanian Cinematography Workers' Union. From 1959 to 1967, he was deputy chairman of the Presidium of the Supreme Soviet of the Lithuanian SSR . Baltušis was a deputy of the Supreme Soviet for several decades.

== Later life and work ==
In 1947, Baltušis published his play Gieda gaideliai (The Cocks Are Crowing). He continued to publish short story collections such as What Isn't Sung About (1959), Valiusa Needs Alek-sas (1965), and In the Fathers’ and Brothers’ Footsteps (1967). In 1957 he published the first volume of his popular novel Parduotos vasaros (Sold-out Summers), the second of which was published in 1969. These works typically used vibrant, persuasive language and had sociological and political undertones.

In 1979, Baltušis published one of his most acclaimed and successful works, Sakmė apie Juzą (The Tale of Juzas), a depiction of the hermit Jesus, who finds it impossible to hide from global cataclysms such as genocide and war. Critically acclaimed, the novel won the Lithuanian SSR State Prize. From 1980 until 1986 he served as the chairman of the Lithuanian Peace Defense Committee (Lithuanian section of the Soviet Peace Committee).

== Death and legacy ==
Baltušis died in Vilnius in 1991. The end of his life was marked with controversy due to his pro-Russian sentiments in spring 1990 as independence loomed. He is buried in the Antakalnis Cemetery, Vilnius. His plays have become staples in the Lithuanian theatrical circuit.

== Notable works ==
- 1940 – Savaitė prasideda gerai (short story collection)
- 1943 – Baltieji dobiliukai (short story collection)
- 1947 – Gieda gaideliai (drama)
- 1952 – Rinktinė (drama)
- 1956 – Anksti rytelį (play)
- 1957 – Parduotos vasaros, Part 1 (novel)
- 1959 – Kas dainon nesudėta (travelogue)
- 1963 – Aš jau ne piemenė (short story)
- 1965 – Valiusei reikia Alekso (short story collection)
- 1967 – Tėvų ir brolių takais (travelogue)
- 1969 – Parduotos vasaros, Part II (novel)
- 1971 – Nežvyruotu vieškeliu (short story collection)
- 1973 – Su kuo valgyta druska, Part I
- 1975 – Žodis apie žmogų
- 1976 – Su kuo valgyta druska, Part II
- 1979 – Sakmė apie Juzą (novel)
- 1985 – Pasakymai ir atsakymai
