= Pergalė =

Pergalė (meaning Victory in English) was a literary magazine in Soviet Lithuania issued between 1942 and 1990.

== Profile ==
Pergalė was started in 1942 as a literary supplement to the army newspaper Motherland is Calling ("Tėvynė šaukia") of the 16th "Lithuanian" Rifle Division (Soviet Union), hence the name. The magazine had its headquarters in Vilnius. It included articles about nature in addition to those on literary work.

== Editors in chief ==
- Juozas Pajaujis – 1942
- Kostas Korsakas – 1943–1944
- Petras Cvirka – 1945
- Juozas Baltušis – 1946–1954
- Jonas Šimkus – 1954–1958
- Vladas Mozūriūnas – 1958–1964
- Algimantas Baltakis – 1964–1976, 1985–1990
- Juozas Macevičius – 1976–1985
- Juozas Aputis – 1990

== See also ==
- List of magazines in Lithuania
