= Kazys Binkis =

Lithuanian poet, journalist, and playwright

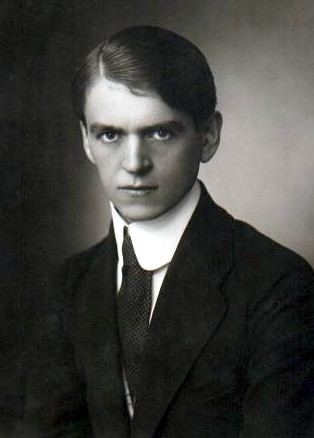
- Binkis in 1920
- Born: 16 November 1893; Gudeliai, Panevėžys County, Russian Empire
- Died: 27 April 1942 (aged 48); Kaunas, Reichskommissariat Ostland
- Other names: K. Alijošius; K. Papilietis; Kazys; Kazys Roviejietis; Nedarbininkas; Neklaipėdietis; Nelatvis; Nepartyvis; Ras Desta; Riza Chanas
- Education: Humboldt University of Berlin
- Occupations: Poet, journalist, playwright
- Years active: 1909–1942
- Spouses: Pranė Binkienė; Sofija Binkienė
- Children: 2

Kazys Binkis (16 November 1893 – 27 April 1942) was a Lithuanian poet, journalist, and playwright.

== Biography ==
Kazys Binkis was born on 16 November 1893 in the village of Gudeliai in Biržai District Municipality. He attended primary school at Papilys, graduating in 1908; he studied at the Saulė (The Sun), taking courses for teachers and at Biržai progymnasium. In 1910 he entered the school of agriculture in Voronec (near Švenčionys), but for the lack of funds moved to Vilnius in 1913 and began to prepare himself privately for matriculation examinations. In 1909, Binkis began to publish prose and verse in Viltis (The Hope), Vaivorykštė (The Rainbow), and Pirmasis baras (The First Field). In 1915 he graduated from the teachers' courses of the Lithuanian Committee in Vilnius and became a teacher at Papilys. In 1918 Binkis was elected a chairman of the Biržai District Council. In 1919 he was appointed a secretary of editorial board of the journal Liepsna (The Flame) in Vilnius. In the same year he moved to Kaunas. There he worked at the press bureau, volunteered for the Geležinis Vilkas (The Iron Wolf) regiment and participated in concerts. In 1920-1923 he studied, with interruptions, literature and philosophy at Berlin University. At the same time he took part in the literary movement Keturi vėjai (The Four Winds), being the leader of the budding Lithuanian futurism (1922–1928).

He made his living from literary work. In 1922, together with other authors, he published an almanac The Prophet of the Four Winds; in 1924 he organized a journal Keturi vėjai. He edited anthologies of Lithuanian folk poetry and songs. He also worked at the Society of Lithuanian Writers; for some years was a member of its board. He was a contributor to Literatūros naujienos (The News of Literature) and worked as a journalist.

Binkis died on 27 April 1942 in Kaunas, and is buried at Petrašiūnai Cemetery.

== Literary works ==
The heritage of Binkis's works is not large, but in all fields he achieved significant results. He wrote humorous and satirical poems, rhymed feuilletons, and published poetry books for children.

In 1920 his first collection of poems Eilėraščiai (The Poems) was published. This collection of lyrical poems is one of the best works of Lithuanian poetry of this era. During his studies in Berlin Binkis was influenced by modernist poetry; this led him to found the modernist Keturi vėjai (Four Winds) literary movement. Keturi vėjai did not leave great literary works but broke the routine, brought new literary forms, and this way made big impact on Lithuanian poetry. In 1923 (second edition in 1926) he published his second, futurist, collection of poems 100 Pavasarių (One Hundred Springs). From 1927 to 1931 Binkis published humorous poems in various periodicals; some of them were published as separate books - Tamošius Bekepuris ir kitos Alijošiaus dainuškos was published in 1928, Kriaučius Motiejus (Tailor Motiejus) was published in 1947.

He debuted as a play writer in 1938 with a piece Atžalynas (The Undergrowth). Encouraged by the success of his debut, he started writing a new play Generalinė repeticija (Dress Rehearsal) which he did not complete. Generalinė repeticija had bigger ambitions, a different form, and composition. Generalinė repeticija was first time staged abroad, in Hanau camp in 1948, and was published in 1958 in Pergalė journal. In Lithuania it was staged for the first time in 1959 (Ostrauskas, 1997).

== Righteous Among the Nations ==
During the Nazi occupation Binkis hid Lithuanian Jews in his home. At the Yad Vashem Holocaust memorial in Jerusalem, there is a tree planted, commemorating Sofia and Kazys Binkis as among the "Righteous Among the Nations" (number 660).

== External sources ==
- Poems by Kazys Binkis
