= Petras Cvirka =

Lithuanian writer

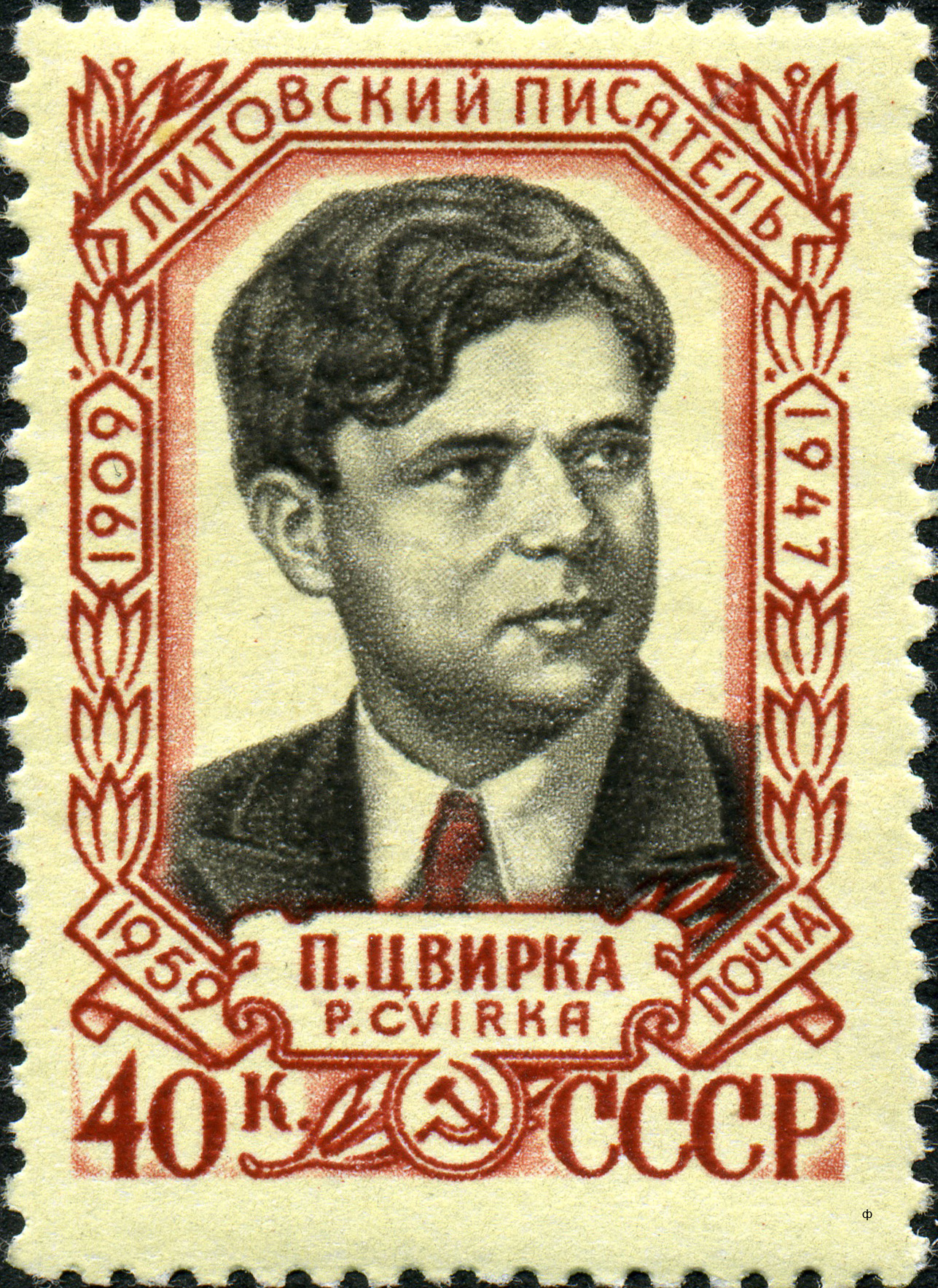
- A 1959 USSR stamp dedicated to Petras Cvirka
- Born: March 12, 1909; Klangiai, Kovno Governorate
- Died: May 2, 1947 (aged 38); Vilnius, Lithuanian SSR

Signature
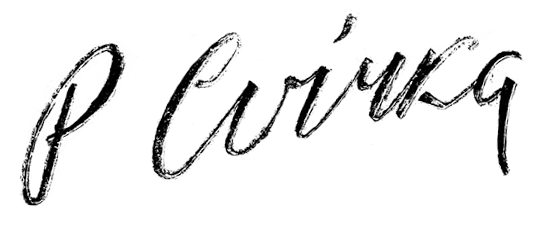

Petras Cvirka (March 12, 1909 – May 2, 1947) was a Lithuanian writer of several novels, children's books, and short story collections. He wrote under a variety of pen names: A. Cvingelis, Cezaris Petrėnas, J. K. Pavilionis, K. Cvirka, Kanapeikus, Kazys Gerutis, Klangis, Klangis Petras, Klangių Petras, L. P. Cvirka, Laumakys, P. Cvinglis, P. Cvirka-Rymantas, P. Gelmė, P. Veliuoniškis, Petras Serapinas, and S. Laumakys. His works have been translated into Belarusian, Bulgarian, Chinese, Czech, English, Estonian, Hungarian, Latvian, Polish, Romanian, and Uzbek.

== Biography ==
Cvirka attended an art school in Kaunas between 1926 and 1930. However, after graduation he drifted away from visual arts to literature. He began publishing poetry in 1924 and studied literature in Paris during 1931 and 1932. He translated 9 books and 34 shorter works from French into Lithuanian. Later in the decade he travelled to Moscow, Leningrad, and western Europe. He published works in the magazine Trečias frontas (Third Front), which was financially supported by the underground Communist Party of Lithuania (LCP) and later collaborated with the magazine Literatūra (Literature), also organized and financed by the LCP.

=== Support to the Soviets ===
He joined the Communist Party in 1940 and supported Lithuania's incorporation into the Soviet Union.

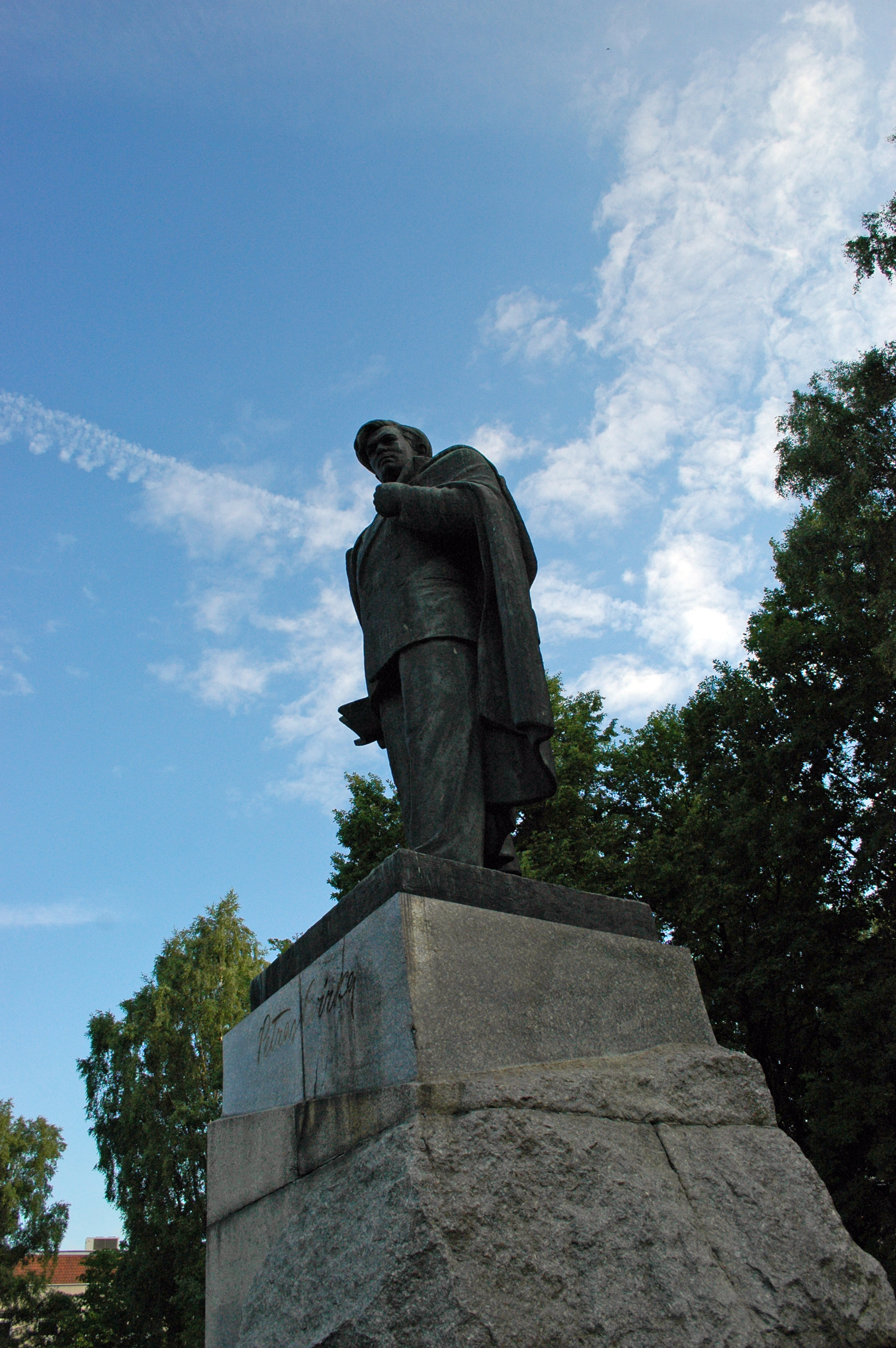
Monument of Petras Cvirka

In 1941, following the outbreak of war between Germany and the Soviet Union, he moved to Alma-Ata and then Moscow, joining the Union of Writers of the USSR. Returning to Lithuania in 1944, he went on to serve as chairman of the Lithuanian Soviet Socialist Republic's Writer's Union and as editor of the journal Pergalė (Victory).

After Cvirka's death in 1947, the Soviet authorities erected a monument to his memory in Vilnius. This monument became the object of controversy after the restoration of independence in 1990 due to Cvirka's pro-communist activities. On November 19, 2021 the statue was removed. In 2025, as part of ongoing desovietization of public spaces, Vilnius municipality decided to rename a square named after Petras Cvirka.

== Works ==
Cvirka's works combine biting commentary on social issues with keen feelings for the natural world. His works are also known for their wit and strong dialogue. The novel Meisteris ir sūnūs depicts the folk art of Lithuania in a new way. It incorporates plentiful folkloric and ethnographic details of Lithuanian village life and attempts to translate rich oral traditions into the written medium. A prominent example of socialist realism, the novel Žemė maitintoja depicts an ideal new socialist man. The protagonist is a young, non-religious, determined farmer, who received his land as a result of the land reform when estates of former nobility were divided among the poor. He has no emotional attachment to his land, rather perceiving the economic benefits of collective farming. This is an example of a person who needs to be created by communism. The two-volume Frank Kruk is a satirical novel about Pranas Krukelis, a Lithuanian immigrant to the United States who Americanizes his name to Frank Kruk. Krukelis engages in criminal activity and exploits other Lithuanian immigrants. A theatrical adaptation was staged in Klaipėda in 2003; Vytautas Paukštė received the Lithuanian National Prize for his portrayal of Kruk. Cvirka was the first writer to address the Lithuanian partisans – anti-Soviet guerrilla fighters – in the short story Pabučiavimas, one of his last works.

== Selected bibliography ==
- Pirmosios mišios (The First Mass, 1928)
- Saulėlydis Nykos valsčiuje (The Sunset in the Community of Nyka, 1930)
- Frank Kruk (1934)
- Meisteris ir sūnūs (The Artisan and His Sons, 1936)
- Žemė maitintoja (Land the Nourisher, 1946)
- Brolybės sėkla (Seeds of Fraternity, 1947) from Archive.org (English)
