= Kostas Korsakas =

Soviet Lithuanian literary scholar and critic

Kostas Korsakas (5 October 1909 – 22 November 1986) was a Lithuanian and Soviet literary researcher, critic, philologist, poet and public figure.

== Biography ==
Born in to a poor working-class family, Korsakas spent most of his childhood in Riga where his parents looked for work. He did not finish his secondary education and was expelled from his gymnasium for student activities. He started his literary activity in 1923 and wrote journalistic articles under the pseudonym Jonas Radžvilas. In 1925, In Šiauliai, he edited the futurists' newspaper Ateities žiedas and from 1931 to 1933 he editor of the literary department of the magazine Kultūra, and from 1933 to 1941 the actual editor of the magazine.

In 1928, Korsakas was arrested alongside some fellow students who were interested in Marxism and was held in the Šiauliai prison. A group of their friends requested amnesty from the president Antanas Smetona by starting a petition which ended up successful. Korsakas was expelled from the Lithuanian Komsomol after receiving the amnesty.

He continued his literary activities by becoming a co founder of the left-wing Trečias frontas magazine and a contributor to the magazine Literatūra. From 1931 to 1936 he attended literary courses at the Vytautas Magnus University in Kaunas. During this period he contributed to multiple Lithuanian cultural and literary magazines.

With the Soviet occupation of Lithuania, he was appointed chairman of the State Publishing House of the Lithuanian SSR. After the beginning of the German invasion of the Soviet Union, Korsakas settled in Moscow and became chairman of the Lithuanian Union of Writers and was an editor of the Pergalė magazine.

After the end of German occupation, from 1944 he was a professor at the Department of Lithuanian Literature at Vilnius University and from 1944 to 1956 he was dean of the Faculty of History and Philology at Vilnius University. From 1946, he was also director of the Institute of the Lithuanian Language and Literature of the Academy of Sciences of the Lithuanian SSR.

Korsakas was a deputy (1947–1963) and then Deputy Chairman (1959–1963) of the Supreme Soviet of the Lithuanian SSR.

He was buried in Antakalnis cemetery. One street in the city of Šiauliai was named after him.

== Literary works ==
Korsakas researched the origin of Lithuanians and the Lithuanian language, wrote works of literary criticism, and encyclopedic articles. In journalism, he studied literature, books, culture, and other societal problems. He also developed criticism of journalism, analyzed periodical publications. His literary criticisms and some works of literary studies are also publicistic in nature. In criticism, he used sociologized methods of interpreting literary works, borrowed from Russian revolutionary democrats and Marxists (such as Vissarion Belinsky, Georgi Plekhanov, V. V. Vorovsky and V. M. Fritsche).

Kosakas also published several collections of poems - "Kovos įstatymas" ("The Law of Struggle", 1943), "Paukščiai grįžta" ("The Birds Return", 1945), "Pjūtis" (1969), "Lapkritys" (1979).
