= Lists of writers =

The following are lists of writers:

== Alphabetical indices ==
A – B – C – D – E – F – G – H – I – J – K – L – M – N – O – P – Q – R – S – T – U – V – W – X – Y – Z

== Lists by century ==
- 20th-century
- 21st-century

== Lists by genre ==
- Autobiographies
- Bestsellers
- Biographers
- Buddhism
- Business theorists
- Catholicism
- Children's literature
- Christian fiction
- Crime
- Detective fiction
- Drama
- Essays
- Fantasy
- History
- Historical novels
- Horror fiction
- Horsemanship
- Illustrations
- Manga
- Music theory
- Mysteries
- Non-fiction
- Novels
- Occult
- Plays
- Poetry
- Politics
- Role-playing games
- Romantic novels
- Science fiction
- Self-help
- Short stories
- Software
- Thrillers
- Translations
- Western fiction
- Young adult

Top of page

== Lists by language (non-English) ==
- Ancient Greek
- Asturian
- Arabic
- Bengali
- Catalan
- Chewa
- Dutch
- Esperanto
- French
- German
- Gujarati
- Greek
- Hebrew
- Hindi
- Leonese
- Lithuanian
- Malayalam
- Marathi
- Nepali
- Odia
- Pukhto or Pashto
- Persian
- Polish
- Portuguese
- Russian
- Spanish
- Swedish
- Tamil
- Turkish
- Ukrainian
- Urdu
- Uzbek
- Welsh

Top of page

== Lists by ethnicity, nationality or identity ==
General

- Exophonic writers
- LGBTQ writers
- Non-binary writers
- Military writers
- Nurse writers
- Physician writers
- Novelists by nationality
- Playwrights by nationality and year of birth

By country

- African writers by country
- African-American writers
- Albanian writers
- Algerian writers
- American writers
- Arab American writers
- Armenian writers
- Asian-American writers
- Assyrian writers
- Australian writers
- Bangladeshi writers
- Barbadian writers
- Black British writers
- Bosniak writers
- British Jewish writers
- Brazilian writers
- Canadian writers
- Chinese writers
- Colombian writers
- Croatian writers
- Cuban writers
- Cuban-American writers
- Dominican writers
- English writers
- Egyptian writers
- Georgian writers
- Ghanaian writers
- Greek writers
- Grenadian writers
- Guyanese writers
- Hungarian writers
- Icelandic writers
- Indian writers
- Iranian writers
- Irish writers
- Italian writers
- Jamaican writers
- Jewish American writers
- Kenyan writers
- Korean American writers
- Macedonian writers
- Mexican writers
- Malawian writers
- Mexican-American writers
- Moroccan writers
- Native American writers
- Nepali writers
- New Zealand writers
- Nigerian writers
- Norwegian writers
- Pakistani writers
- Peruvian writers
- Filipino writers
- Portuguese writers
- Puerto Rican writers
- Romanian writers
- Russian writers
- Saudi Arabian writers
- Scottish writers
- Serbian writers
- Slovak writers
- Slovenian writers
- Somali writers
- Spanish writers
- South African writers
- Surinamese writers
- Taiwanese writers
- Tanzanian writers
- Trinidad and Tobago writers
- Turkish
- Ukrainian writers
- Ugandan writers
- Uruguayan writers
- Venezuelan writers
- Zimbabwean writers

Top of page

== Lists of women writers and works ==
Main list

- Women writers: (A-L), (M-Z)

By country

- Albanian women writers
- Algerian women writers
- Argentine women writers
- Austrian women writers
- Azerbaijani women writers
- Bangladeshi women writers
- Belgian women writers
- Bolivian women writers
- Bosnian women writers
- Brazilian women writers
- Bulgarian women writers
- Chilean women writers
- Chinese women writers
- Colombian women writers
- Croatian women writers
- Cuban women writers
- Czech women writers
- Danish women writers
- Dutch women writers
- Ecuadorian women writers
- Egyptian women writers
- Estonian women writers
- Faroese women writers
- Filipino women writers
- Finnish women writers
- French women writers
- German women writers
- Ghanaian women writers
- Greek women writers
- Guatemalan women writers
- Guyanese women writers
- Hungarian women writers
- Icelandic women writers
- Indian women writers
- Indonesian women writers
- Iranian women writers
- Irish women writers
- Italian women writers
- Ivorian women writers
- Japanese women writers
- Jamaican women writers
- Kenyan women writers
- Korean women writers
- Latvian women writers
- Lebanese women writers
- Lithuanian women writers
- Luxembourgish women writers
- Macedonian women writers
- Malaysian women writers
- Mexican women writers
- Moroccan women writers
- New Zealand women writers
- Nicaraguan women writers
- Nigerian women writers
- Norwegian women writers
- Pakistani women writers
- Panamanian women writers
- Paraguayan women writers
- Peruvian women writers
- Polish women writers
- Portuguese women writers
- Puerto Rican women writers
- Romanian women writers
- Russian women writers
- Senegalese women writers
- Serbian women writers
- Slovak women writers
- Slovenian women writers
- South African women writers
- Spanish women writers
- Swedish women writers
- Swiss women writers
- Trinidad and Tobago women writers
- Tunisian women writers
- Turkish women writers
- Ugandan women writers
- Ukrainian women writers
- Uruguayan women writers
- Welsh women writers
- Zimbabwean women writers

Other lists of women writers

- Women comics creators
- Women cookbook writers
- Early-modern British women novelists
- Early-modern British women playwrights
- Early-modern British women poets
- Women electronic literature writers
- Women experimental writers
- Women mystery writers
- Women Nobel laureates
- Women poets
- Modernist women writers
- Women printers/publishers before 1800
- Women rhetoricians
- Women speculative fiction authors
- Biographical dictionaries of women writers in English
- Norton Anthology of Literature by Women

Top of page

== Lists by publisher ==
- List of Alfred A. Knopf authors
- List of Minerva Press authors

Top of page

== See also ==
- Lists of books
- List of literary awards
