= List of Lithuanian women writers =

This is a list of women writers who were born in Lithuania or whose writings are closely associated with that country.

== A ==
- Gintarė Adomaitytė (born 1957), journalist
- Loreta Anilionytė, philosopher, educator, non-fiction writer, novelist, since 2000
- Yemima Avidar-Tchernovitz (1909–1998), Lithuanian-born Hebrew children's writer
- Magdalena Avietėnaitė (1892–1984), journalist, diplomat and a public figure

== B ==
- Ona Baliukonė (1948–2007), poet, essayist, painter

== C ==
- Laura Sintija Černiauskaitė (born 1976), playwright, novelist
- Birutė Ciplijauskaitė (1929–2017), scholar, translator

== G ==
- Ona Galdikaitė (1898–1990), Lithuanian nun, poet and dissident writer, theological translator
- Marija Gimbutas (1921–1994), Lithuanian-American translator, non-fiction writer, writings in German and English on archaeology, Lithuanian culture
- Emma Goldman (1869–1940), Lithuanian-born Russian-American memoirist, autobiographer, publisher, anarchist
- Aldona Gustas (1932–2022), Lithuanian-born German-language poet, illustrator, feminist, works translated into several languages
- Gabija Grušaitė (born1987) Lithuanian-born writer, curator, and cultural entrepreneur.

== H ==
- Esther Hautzig (1930–2009), Lithuanian-born American, author of the autobiographical work The Endless Steppe

== I ==
- Jurga Ivanauskaitė (1961–2007), novelist, short story writer, poet, essayist, some works translated into English

== J ==
- Vidmantė Jasukaitytė (1948–2018), poet, novelist, short story writer, essayist
- Vanda Juknaitė (born 1949), playwright, novelist, memoirist

== K ==
- Ugnė Karvelis (1935–2002), novelist, translator, publisher, editor

== L ==
- Marija Lastauskienė (1872–1957), novelist, short story writer, journalist, frequently writing jointly with her sister under the pen name Lazdynų Pelėda, wrote in Polish and Lithuanian
- Meilė Lukšienė (1913–2009), writings on education and Lithuanian culture

== M ==
- Edita Mildažytė (born 1966), journalist, talk show host
- Miriam Mosessohn (1841–1920), Lithuanian-born Hebrew-language translator of German novels

== N ==
- Salomėja Nėris, pen name of Salomėja Bačinskaitė-Bučienė (1904–1945), acclaimed poet

== P ==
- Gabrielė Petkevičaitė-Bitė (1861–1943), journalist, novelist, short story writer, playwright
- Sofija Pšibiliauskienė (1867–1926), wrote jointly with her sister Marija Lastauskienė under the pen name Lazdynų Pelėda, journalist, short story writer, novelist, usually writing in Polish
- Paulina Pukytė (born 1966), artist, poet, essayist, critic

== R ==
- Giedra Radvilavičiūtė (born 1960), journalist, short story writer
- Undinė Radzevičiūtė (born 1967), novelist, worked in advertising

== S ==
- Kristina Sabaliauskaitė (born 1974), art historian, historical novelist, short story writer
- Šatrijos Ragana (Witch of Šatrija), pen name of Marija Pečkauskaitė (1877–1930), short story writer, novelist, translator
- Ieva Simonaitytė (1897–1978), historical novelist, works often subjected to Soviet censorship

== V ==
- Laima Vaitkunskienė (born 1936), archaeologist
- Indrė Valantinaitė (born 1984), poet, singer

== Z ==
- Žemaitė, pen name of Julija Beniuševičiūtė-Žymantienė (1845–1921), novelist, short story writer

== See also ==
- List of Lithuanians
- List of women writers
