= List of Lithuanian-language authors =

This is a list of Lithuanian language writers.

- Mikalojus Akelaitis (1829–1887)
- Antanas Baranauskas (1835–1902)
- Bernardas Brazdžionis (1907–2002)
- Teodoras Četrauskas (1944–2024)
- Mikalojus Daukša (after 1527–1613)
- Venceslaus Agrippa Lituanus (c. 1525–c.1597)
- Kristijonas Donelaitis (1714–1780)
- Romualdas Granauskas (1939–2014)
- Juozas Grušas (1901–1986)
- Vincas Krėvė-Mickevičius (1882–1954)
- Vytautas Mačernis (1921–1944)
- Maironis (1862–1932)
- Justinas Marcinkevičius (1930–2011)
- Martynas Mažvydas (1510–1563)
- Vincas Mykolaitis-Putinas (1893–1967)
- Salomėja Nėris (1904–1945)
- Henrikas Radauskas (1910–1970)
- Liudvikas Rėza (1776–1840)
- Rapolas Šaltenis (1908–2007), journalist, author, translator, and teacher
- Antanas Škėma (1910–1961)
- Balys Sruoga (1896–1947)
- Vydūnas (1868–1953)
- Žemaitė (1845–1921)
- Indrė Valantinaitė (born 1984), poet
- Vanda Juknaitė (born 1949), writer, playwright and essayist.
- Jurga Ivanauskaitė (1961 - 2007)
- Gabija Grušaitė (born 1987), writer, curator, and cultural entrepreneur.
