= List of writers by name: Y =

The following is a List of writers by name whose last names begin with Y:

Abbreviations: ch = children's; d = drama, screenwriting; f = fiction; nf = non-fiction; p = poetry, song lyrics

- Kateb Yacine (1929–1989, Algeria, f/d/nf)
- Sakena Yacoobi (born 1949/1950, Afghanistan, nf)
- Kulpreet Yadav (born 1968, India, f/d)
- Obelit Yadgar (1941–2023, Iraq/US, nf)
- Dov Yaffe (1928–2017, Lithuania/Israel, nf)
- Elham Yaghoubian (born 1972, Iran/US, nf)
- Jūkichi Yagi (八木重吉, 1898–1927, Japan, p)
- Tetiana Yakovenko (born 1954, Ukraine, p)
- Said Yaktine (born 1955, Morocco, nf)
- Mehri Yalfani (living, Iran/Canada, f)
- David Yallop (1937–2018, England, nf)
- Yamabe no Akahito (山部赤人, fl. 724–736, Japan, p)
- Amy Yamada (山田詠美, born 1959, Japan, f/nf)
- Yamada Bimyō (山田美妙, 1868–1910, Japan, f)
- Futaro Yamada (山田風太郎, 1922, 2001, Japan, f)
- Hiroo Yamagata (山形浩生, born 1964, Japan, nf)
- Hitomi Yamaguchi (山口瞳, 1923–1995, Japan, f/nf)
- Shūgorō Yamamoto (清水三十六, 1903–1967, Japan, f)
- Bochō Yamamura (山村暮鳥, 1884–1924, Japan, p/ch)
- Yamanoue no Okura (山上憶良, c. 660 – c. 733, Japan, p/ch)
- Toyoko Yamasaki (山崎豊子, 1924–2013, Japan, f)
- Hōdai Yamazaki (山崎方代, 1914–1985, Japan, p)
- Nao-Cola Yamazaki (山崎ナオコーラ, born 1978, Japan, f)
- Yamazaki Sōkan (山崎宗鑑, 1465–1553, Japan, p)
- Frederick Kambemba Yamusangie (living, Democratic Republic of Congo, f/d/p)
- Yamyam (1946–2005, Somalia/US, p/d), born Abdulkadir Hersi Siyad
- Yan Ge (颜歌, born 1984, China/Ireland, f)
- Geling Yan (嚴歌苓, born 1958, China/US, f/d)
- Yan Lianke (阎连科, born 1958, China, f)
- Yan Shigu (顏師古, 581–645, China, nf)
- Yan Zhenqing (顏真卿, 709–785, China, nf)
- Yan Zhitui (顏之推, 531–591, China, nf)
- Rick Yancey (born 1962, US, f/ch)
- Agustín Yáñez (1904–1980, Mexico, nf/f)
- Yang Borun (楊伯潤, 1837–1911, China, p)
- Yang Erche Namu (楊二車娜姆, born 1966, China, nf)
- Yang Gang (杨刚, 1905–1957, China, f/nf)
- Yang Hongying (楊紅櫻, born 1962, China, ch)
- Yang Hui (楊輝, c. 1238–1298, China, nf)
- Yang Jiang (杨绛, 1911–2016, China, d/f/nf)
- Yang Jianli (楊建利, born 1963, China/US, nf)
- Yang Rongguo (楊榮國, 1907–1978, China, nf)
- Yang Shuo (杨朔, 1913–1968, China, p/nf)
- Yang Xiong (揚雄, 53 BCE – 18 CE, China, p/nf)
- Leo Yankevich (1961–2018, US, p)
- Tetsu Yano (矢野徹, 1923–2004, Japan, f)
- Regina Yaou (1955–2017, Ivory Coast, f)
- Jane Yardley (living, England, f)
- Morgan Yasbincek (born 1964, Australia, p/f)
- Shadya Yasin (born 1983/1984, Somalia/Canada, p)
- Nadia Yassine (born 1958, Morocco, nf)
- Shōtarō Yasuoka (安岡章太郎, 1920–2013, Japan, f/nf)
- Dornford Yates (1885–1960, England/S Rhodesia, f/d), pseudonym of Cecil William Mercer
- Frances Yates (1899–1981, England, nf)
- Paula Yates (1959–2000, Wales/England, f/nf)
- Richard Yates (1926–1992, US, f)
- Peyo Yavorov (1878–1914, Bulgaria, p)
- Raushan Yazdani (1917–1967, India/E Pakistan, p/nf)
- Yana Yazova (1912–1974, Bulgaria, p/f), pseudonym of Lyuba Todorova Gancheva
- Rafael Díaz Ycaza (1925–2013, Ecuador, p/f/nf)
- Ye Shengtao (葉聖陶, 1894–1988, China, nf/f/ch)
- Ye Shi (葉適, 1150–1223, China, nf)
- Ting-Xing Ye (born 1952, China/Canada, f/nf/ch)
- Ye Yingchun (叶迎春, born 1970, China, nf)
- Ann Yearsley (1753–1806, England, p)
- Victor Maslin Yeates (1897–1934, England, nf)
- William Butler Yeats (1865–1939, Ireland, p/d/nf)
- Scofray Nana Yaw Yeboah (born 1980, Ghana, nf)
- Chia-ying Yeh (葉嘉瑩, 1924–2024, China/Canada, p/nf)
- A. B. Yehoshua (1936–2022, Palestine/Israel, f/nf/d)
- Tamar Yellin (born 1963, England, f)
- Sadık Yemni (born 1951, Turkey/Netherlands, f/nf)
- Benjamin Yeoh (born 1978, England, d)
- Julia Yeomans (born 1954, England, nf)
- Laurence Yep (葉祥添, born 1948, US, ch)
- Terter Yerevantsi (c. 1290 – c. 1350, Armenia, p)
- Yerrapragada (1325–1353, Reddi Kingdom, p)
- Frank Yerby (1916–1991, US/Spain, f)
- Zabel Yesayan (1878–1943, Ottoman E/USSR, f/nf/p)
- Sergei Yesenin (1895–1925, Russian E/USSR, p)
- Yevgeny Yevtushenko (1933–2017, USSR/US, p/f/nf)
- Anzia Yezierska (1880–1970, Russian E/US, f/nf)
- Nu Nu Yi (born 1957, Burma/Myanmar, f/nf)
- Yi Xing (一行, 683–727, China, nf)
- Bahar Yilmaz (born 1984, Germany, nf)
- Lin Yining (林以寧, 1655 – c. 1730, China, p)
- Asiedu Yirenkyi (1942–2018, Ghana, d)
- Riichi Yokomitsu (横光利一, 1898–1947, Japan, f)
- Seishi Yokomizo (横溝正史, 1902–1981, Japan, f)
- Jun'ya Yokota (横田順彌, 1945–1919, Japan, f)
- Jane Yolen (born 1939, US, f/ch)
- Jin Yong (查良鏞, 1924–2018, China/Hong Kong, f/nf)
- Charlotte Mary Yonge (1823–1901, England, f)
- James Yonge (1646/1647–1721, England, nf)
- Nedyalko Yordanov (born 1940, Bulgaria, p/d/nf)
- Rebecca York (born 1942, US, nf/f/ch), pseudonym Ruth Glick
- Margaret Yorke (1924–2012, England, f)
- Yosa Buson (与謝蕪村, 1716–1784, Japan, p)
- Yosano Akiko (與謝野晶子, 1878–1942, Japan, nf/p)
- Tekkan Yosano (與謝野鐵幹, 1873–1935, Japan, nf/p), pseudonym of Yosano Hiroshi
- Hidekazu Yoshida (吉田秀和, 1913–2012, Japan, nf)
- Ken'ichi Yoshida (吉田健一, 1912–1977, Japan, f/nf)
- Yoshida Kenkō (吉田兼好, 1283 – c. 1350, Japan, nf/p)
- Sunao Yoshida (吉田直, 1969–2004, Japan, f/ch)
- Takuro Yoshida (吉田拓郎, born 1946, Japan, p)
- Isamu Yoshii (吉井勇, 1886–1960, Japan, p/d)
- Eiji Yoshikawa (吉川英治, 1892–1962, Japan, f)
- Yoshiko Yuasa (湯浅芳子, 1896–1990, Japan, f)
- Banana Yoshimoto (吉本ばなな, born 1964, Japan, f/nf)
- Takaaki Yoshimoto (吉本隆明, 1924–2012, Japan, p/nf)
- Akira Yoshimura (吉村昭, 1927–2006, Japan, f/nf)
- Hideo Yoshino (吉野秀雄, 1902–1967, Japan, p)
- Nobuko Yoshiya (吉屋信子, 1896–1973, Japan, f/ch)
- Junnosuke Yoshiyuki (吉行淳之介, 1924–1994, Japan, f)
- Yoshiyuki Tomino (富野由悠季, born 1941, Japan, f/p)
- Andrew Young (1885–1971, Scotland/England, p)
- Arthur Young (1741–1820, England, nf)
- E. H. Young (1880–1949, England, f/ch), pseudonym of Emily Hilda Daniell
- Ed Young (杨志成, 1931–2023, China/US, ch)
- Edward Young (1683–1765, England, p/nf)
- Elizabeth Young (1950–2001, Nigeria/England, nf)
- Ellen Young (c. 1810–1872, England/Australia, p)
- F. E. Mills Young (1875–1945, England, f)
- Ian Young (born 1945, England/Canada, p/nf)
- John Zachary Young (1907–1997, England, nf)
- Kevin Young (born 1970, US, p/nf)
- Louisa Young (living, England, f/nf/ch)
- Marguerite Young (1908–1995, f/p/nf)
- Miriam Young (born 1974, US, ch)
- Robert F. Young (1915–1986, US, f)
- Robyn Young (born 1975, England, f)
- Simpson Charles Younger (1850–1943, US, p)
- Marguerite Yourcenar (1903–1987, Belgium/US, f/nf)
- Malala Yousafzai (born 1997, Pakistan, nf)
- Mohamed Ali Yousfi (born 1950, Tunisia, p/f)
- Lea Ypi (born 1979, Albania/England, nf)
- A. W. Yrjänä (born 1967, Finland, p)
- Yu Dafu (郁達夫, 1896–1945, China, f/p)
- Yu Hao (喻皓, fl. 970, China, nf)
- Yu Huan (魚豢, fl. 3rd c., China, nf)
- Khin Hnin Yu (1925–2003, Burma/Myanmar, f)
- Miri Yu (柳美里/유미리, born 1968, Korea/Japan, d/f/nf)
- Lizzie Yu Der Ling (裕德齡, 1885–1944, China/US, f/nf)
- Nellie Yu Roung Ling (裕容齡, 1889–1973, China, f/nf)
- Yu Shinan (虞世南, 558–638, China, nf)
- Yu Xuanji (魚玄機, c. 840 – c. 868, China, p)
- Yu Zhengxie (兪正燮, 775–840, China, nf)
- Yuan Hongdao (袁宏道, 1568–1610, China, p)
- Yuan Mei (袁枚, 1716–1797, China, p)
- Yuan Zhen (元稹, 779–831, China, p/nf)
- David Yudelman (living, S Africa/Canada, nf)
- Baku Yumemakura (夢枕獏, born 1951, Japan, f/nf)
- Yumeno Kyūsaku (夢野久作, 1889–1936, Japan, f), pseudonym of Sugiyama Yasumichi (杉山泰道)
- Carlos Yushimito (born 1977, Peru, f)
