= Jónasson =

Jónasson is a surname of Icelandic origin, meaning son of Jónas. In Icelandic names the name is not strictly a surname, but a patronymic.

Notable people with that name include:

- Hermann Jónasson (1896–1976), Icelandic politician; prime minister of Iceland 1934–42 and 1956–58
- Kristján B. Jónasson (contemporary), Icelandic book publisher
