= List of writers by name: J =

The following is a List of writers by name whose last names begin with J:

Abbreviations: ch = children's; d = drama, screenwriting; f = fiction; nf = non-fiction; p = poetry, song lyrics

== Ja ==
- Noni Jabavu (1919–2008, S Africa, nf)
- Edmond Jabès (1912–1991, Egypt/France, nf/p)
- Edward Jablonski (1922–2004, US, nf)
- F. P. Jac (1955–2008, Denmark, p), birth name Flemming Palle Jakobsen
- Philippe Jaccottet (1925–2021, Switzerland, p)
- António Jacinto (1924–1991, Angola/Portugal, p), pseudonym Orlando Tavora
- Donald Jack (1924–2003, England/Canada, f/d)
- Anna Jackson (born 1967, N Zealand, p/f/nf)
- Brenda Jackson (born 1953, US, f)
- Elaine Jackson (born 1943, US, f)
- Katherine Jackson (born 1930, US, nf)
- Mick Jackson (born 1960, England, f)
- Shirley Jackson (1919–1965, US, f/nf)
- Heinrich Eduard Jacob (1889–1967, Germany/US, nf)
- Max Jacob (1876–1944, France, p/f), Holocaust victim
- Violet Jacob (1863–1946, Scotland, f/p)
- Friedrich Heinrich Jacobi (1743–1819, Germany, nf)
- Johann Georg Jacobi (1740–1814, Germany, p)
- Anna Jacobs (born 1941, England/Australia, f)
- Christianne Meneses Jacobs (born 1971, Nicaragua/US, nf)
- Jane Jacobs (1916–2006, US/Canada, nf)
- Joseph Jacobs (1854–1916, Australia/US, nf)
- W. W. Jacobs (1863–1943, England, f/d)
- Alf Reidar Jacobsen (born 1950, Norway, nf/f)
- Anna Jacobsen (1924–2004, Norway, nf)
- Jens Peter Jacobsen (1847–1885, Denmark, f/p/nf)
- Rolf Jacobsen (1907–1994, Norway, p)
- Roy Jacobsen (1954–2025, Norway, f)
- Howard Jacobson (born 1942, England, f)
- Brian Jacques (1939–2011, England, f)
- Frances Jacson (1754–1842, England, f/nf)
- Mhlobo Jadezweni (born 1954, S Africa, ch/p/nf)
- Hans Jæger (1854–1910, Norway/Sweden, nf)
- Muriel Jaeger (1892–1969, England, f/d/nf)
- Fleur Jaeggy (born 1940, Switzerland/Italy, f), pseudonym Carlotta Wieck
- Ada Jafarey (1924–2015, India/Pakistan, p)
- Alireza Jafarzadeh (living, Iran/US, nf)
- Ada Jafri (1924–2015, India/Pakistan, p)
- Maya Jaggi (living, England, nf)
- Richard Jago (1715–1781, England, p/nf)
- Annamarie Jagose (born 1965, N Zealand, nf/f)
- Marie-Reine de Jaham (born 1940, Martinique/France, f/nf)
- Linda Jaivin (born 1955, US/Australia, nf/f)
- John Jakes (1932–2023, US, f)
- T. D. Jakes (born 1957, US, nf)
- Svava Jakobsdóttir (1930–2004, Iceland, f/p/d)
- Stevan Jakovljević (1890–1962, Serbia/Yugoslavia, f/nf)
- Đura Jakšić (1832–1878, Austrian E/Serbia, p/f/d)
- Mileta Jakšić (1863–1935, Austrian E/Yugoslavia, p)
- Jakuren (寂蓮, 1139–1202, Japan, p)
- Saifuddin Jalal (born 1958, Afghanistan, nf/p)
- Janez Jalen (1891–1966, Austrian E/Yugoslavia, nf/d/f)
- Mohammad-Ali Jamalzadeh (1892–1997, Iran/Switzerland, f)
- Sousa Jamba (born 1966, Angola, f/nf)
- Alice James (1848–1892, US, nf)
- Barbara James (1943–2003, US/Australia, nf)
- C. L. R. James (1901–1989, Trinidad & Tobago/England, nf/d/f)
- Christine James (born 1954, Wales, p)
- Clive James (1939–2019, Australia/England, nf/p)
- Daniel James (1848–1920, Wales, p)
- E. L. James (born 1963, England, f)
- Edward James (1569 – c. 1610, Wales, nf)
- Elinor James (1644–1719, England, nf)
- Eloisa James (born 1962, US, f/nf), pseudonym of Mary Bly
- Evan James (1809–1878, Wales, p)
- Florence James (1902–1993, N Zealand/Australia, ch/f)
- George Payne Rainsford James (1799–1860, England, f/nf)
- Grace James (1882–1965, Japan/Italy, ch)
- Henry James (1843–1916, US/England, f/d/nf)
- Henry James Sr. (1811–1882, US, nf)
- M. R. James (1862–1936, England, f/nf)
- Maria James (1793–1868, Wales/US, p)
- Marlon James (born 1970, Jamaica, f)
- P. D. James (1920–2014, England, f)
- Peter James (born 1948, England, f)
- Rebecca James (born 1970, Australia, f/ch)
- Wendy James, born 1966, Australia, f)
- William James (1842–1910, US, nf)
- Winifred Lewellin James (1876–1941, Australia, f/nf)
- James VI and I (1566–1625, Scotland/England, nf)
- W. C. Jameson (born 1942, US, nf/d/p)
- Kathleen Jamie (born 1962, Scotland, p/nf)
- Alexander Jamieson (1782–1850, Scotland/Belgium, nf)
- Francis Jammes (1868–1938, France, p)
- Amadis Jamyn (1538–1592, France, p)
- Drago Jančar (born 1948, Yugoslavia/Slovenia, f/d/nf)
- Ernst Jandl (1925–2000, Austria, p)
- Emma Jane (born 1969, Australia, nf/f)
- Phil Janes (living, US, f/ch)
- Slavko Janevski (1920–2000, Yugoslavia/N Macedonia, f/d)
- James Janeway (1636–1674, England, ch)
- Shahid Mahmud Jangi (living, Bangladesh, p/nf)
- Klemens Janicki (1516–1543, Poland, p)
- Laurence Janifer (1933–2002, US, f)
- Éva Janikovszky (1926–2003, Hungary, ch/f)
- Shelina Zahra Janmohamed (born 1974, England, nf)
- Jans der Enikel (late 13th c., Austrian E, p/nf)
- Tove Jansson (1914–2001, Finland, f/ch)
- Patricia Janus (1932–2006, US, p)
- Janus Pannonius (1434–1472, Slavonia/Hungary, p)
- Jao Tsung-I (季羨林, 1917–2018, China, nf)
- David Jaomanoro (1953–2014, Mozambique, f/d/p)
- Arthur Japin (born 1956, Netherlands, f)
- Sébastien Japrisot (1931–2003, France, f), pseudonym of Jean-Baptiste Rossi
- Miran Jarc (1900–1942, Austrian E/Yugoslavia, p/f)
- Lisa Jardine (1944–2015, England, nf)
- Mark Jarman (born 1952, US, p/nf)
- Rosemary Hawley Jarman (1935–2015, England, f)
- Peter Jaroš (born 1940, Czechoslovakia/Slovakia, f/d)
- Randall Jarrell (1914–1965, US, p/f/ch)
- Miranda Jarrett (living, US, f), pseudonym of Susan Holloway Scott
- Delia Jarrett-Macauley (living, England, nf/f)
- Alfred Jarry (1873–1907, France, d/f/nf)
- Harry Järv (1921–2009, Finland/Sweden, nf)
- Claude Scudamore Jarvis (1879–1953, England/Egypt, nf)
- Marguerite Florence Laura Jarvis (1886–1964, England, f/d), pseudonym Oliver Sandys
- Robin Jarvis (born 1963, England, f/ch)
- Svein Jarvoll (1946–2026, Norway, p/f/nf)
- Bruno Jasieński (1901–1938, Poland/USSR, p/f/d)
- Jasimuddin (1903–1976, India/Bangladesh, p/d/nf)
- Mieczysław Jastrun (1903–1983, Austria-Hungary/Poland, p/nf)
- Tommy Jaud (born 1970, Germany, f/d)
- Arturo Jauretche (1901–1974, Argentina, nf/p)
- Mikheil Javakhishvili (1880–1937, Russian E/USSR, f)
- Stevan Javellana (1918–1977, Philippines, f)
- László Jávor (1903–1992, Hungary/France, p)
- Mirko Javornik (1909–1986, Austrian E/US, nf/f)
- Jože Javoršek (1920–1990, Yugoslavia, d/p/nf)
- Augusta Jawara (1924–1981, Gambia, d/nf)
- Annie Jay (born 1957, France, ch)
- Charlotte Jay (1919–1996, Australia, f), pseudonym of Geraldine Halls
- Salim Jay (born 1951, France/Morocco, f/nf)
- Latifa Jbabdi (born 1955, Morocco, nf)

== Je–Ji ==
- John Jea (1773 – post-1817, Calabar, nf)
- John Cordy Jeaffreson (1831–1901, England, f/nf)
- Georges Jean (1820–1911, France, p/nf)
- Jean de Meun (c. 1240 – c. 1305, France, p)
- Ann Jebb (1735–1812, England, nf)
- Samuel Jebb (c. 1694–1772, England, nf)
- Eugen Jebeleanu (1911–1991, Romania, p)
- Michael Jecks (born 1960, England, f)
- Alan Jefferies (born 1957, Australia, p/ch)
- Barbara Jefferis (1917–2004, England/Australia, f/ch/nf)
- Richard Jefferies (1848–1887, England, nf/f)
- Oliver Jeffers (born 1977, N Ireland/US, ch)
- Robinson Jeffers (1887–1962, US, p)
- Andrew Jefford (born 1956, England/France, nf/p)
- Francis Jeffrey, Lord Jeffrey (1773–1850, Scotland, nf)
- Sheila Jeffreys (born 1948, England/Australia, nf)
- Sabrina Jeffries (born 1958, US, f)
- Jefimija (1349–1405, Serbia, p), pseudonym of Jelena Mrnjavčević
- Jefrem (c. 1312–1400, Balkans/Serbia, nf/p)
- Jegaatha (born 1956, India, nf/p)
- Cynthia Jele (living, S Africa, f)
- Milosav Jelić (1883–1947, Serbia/Yugoslavia, p)
- Vojin Jelić (1921–2004, Yugoslavia/Croatia, nf/p)
- Elfriede Jelinek (born 1946, Austria, d/f)
- Rod Jellema (1927–2018, US, p)
- Tahar Ben Jelloun (born 1944, Morocco, f)
- Lynn Jenner (living, N Zealand, p/nf)
- Graham Jenkin (born 1948, Australia, p/nf)
- David Jenkins (1912–2002, Wales, nf)
- Elizabeth Jenkins (1905–2010, England, f/nf)
- John Jenkins (Gwili) (1872–1936, Wales, p/nf)
- John Jenkins (poet) (born 1949, Australia, p/nf/f)
- Joseph Jenkins (1818–1898, Wales/Australia, nf/p)
- Mike Jenkins (born 1953, Wales, p/f)
- Robert Thomas Jenkins (1881–1969, Wales, nf)
- Simon Jenko (1835–1869, Austrian E, p/f/nf)
- Elizabeth Jennings (1926–2001, England, p/nf)
- John Edward Jennings (1906–1973, US, f/nf)
- Kate Jennings (1948–2021, Australia, p/nf/f)
- Paul Jennings (born 1943, England/Australia, ch)
- Grace Jennings-Edquist (living, Australia, nf)
- Zoë Jenny (born 1974, Switzerland/England, f)
- Walter Jens (1923–2013, Germany, nf)
- Axel Jensen (1932–2003, Norway, f/p/nf)
- Caroline Schytte Jensen (1848–1935, Norway, p/ch)
- Johannes V. Jensen (1873–1950, Denmark, f/p)
- Merrill Jensen (1905–1980, US, nf)
- Thit Jensen (1876–1957, Denmark, f/d/nf)
- Wilhelm Jensen (1837–1911, Germany, f/p)
- Sydney Jephcott (1864–1951, Australia, p)
- Amy Jephta (living, S Africa, d)
- Edgar Jepson (1863–1938, England, f), pseudonym R. Edison Page
- Margaret Jepson (1907–2003, England, f), pseudonym Pearl Bellairs
- Selwyn Jepson (1899–1989, England, f/d)
- Helen Jerome (1883–1966, Ireland/US, d/nf)
- Jerome K. Jerome (1859–1927, England, f/nf)
- Vladeta Jerotić (1924–2018, Yugoslavia/Serbia, nf)
- P. C. Jersild (born 1935, Sweden, f/nf)
- Janko Jesenský (1874–1945, Hungary/Czechoslovakia, p/nf)
- John Heneage Jesse (1809–1874, England, nf/p/d)
- Afevork Ghevre Jesus (1868–1947, Ethiopia, f/nf)
- Carolina Maria de Jesus (1914–1977, Brazil, nf/d)
- K. W. Jeter (born 1950, US, f)
- Dobroslav Jevđević (1895–1962, Austria-Hungary/Italy, nf/p)
- Zorica Jevremović (born 1948, Yugoslavia/Serbia, d/nf)
- Darinka Jevrić (1947–2007, Yugoslavia/Serbia, p)
- Atanasije Jevtić (1938–2021, Yugoslavia/Serbia, nf)
- Geraldine Jewsbury (1812–1880, England, f/nf)
- Maria Jane Jewsbury (1800–1833, England/India, nf/p)
- Biodun Jeyifo (1946–2026, Nigeria, nf)
- Raj Kamal Jha (born 1966, India, f/nf)
- Ji Kang (嵇康, 223–262 CE, China, nf/p)
- Ji Xianlin (季羨林, 1911–2009, China, nf)
- Ji Yun (紀昀, 1724–1805, China, nf/p)
- Jia Dao (賈島, 779–843, China, p)
- Jia Pingwa (賈平娃, born 1952, China, f/p/nf)
- Jia Rongqing (賈榮慶, living, China/Canada, nf)
- Jia Yinghua (賈英華, born 1952, China, nf)
- Jiang Biwei (蔣碧薇, 1899–1978, China, nf)
- Jiang Fangzhou (蔣方舟, born 1989, China, f/ch)
- Jiang Rong (姜戎, born 1946, China, f/nf)
- Jiang Tingxi (蔣廷錫, 1669–1732, China, nf)
- Jiao Yu (焦玉, fl. 14th c., China, nf)
- Jien (慈円, 1155–1225, Japan, p/nf)
- Jin Shengtan (金聖歎, c. 1610–1661, China, nf)
- Jin Yong (查良鏞, 1924–2018, China, f/nf)
- Jin Yuelin (金岳霖, 1895–1984, China, nf)
- Jing Fang (京房, 78–37 BCE, China, nf)
- Kiyoshi Jinzai (神西清, 1903–1957, Japan, f/nf)
- Jippensha Ikku (十返舎一九, 1765–1831, Japan, f)
- Abbas Jirari (1937–2024, Morocco, nf)
- Noé Jitrik (1928–2022, Argentina, nf/f)
- Jivani (1846–1909, Russian E, p)

== Jo ==
- Paulin Joachim (1931–2012, Benin, p/nf)
- Nick Joaquin (1917–2004, Philippines, f/nf)
- John Thomas Job (1867–1938, Wales, p)
- Elizabeth Jocelin (c. 1595–1622, England, nf)
- Matthías Jochumsson (1835–1920, Iceland, p/d/nf)
- Étienne Jodelle (1532–1573, France, d/p)
- Alexandra Joel (born 1953, Australia, nf/f)
- Joseph Joffo (1931–2018, France, nf)
- Khasnor Johan (born 1968, Malaysia/Australia, nf)
- Johannes von Tepl (c. 1350 – c. 1415, Bohemia, p/nf)
- Georg Johannesen (1931–2005, Norway, f/p/d)
- Guðni Th. Jóhannesson (born 1968, Iceland, nf)
- Barði Jóhannsson (born 1975, Iceland, d)
- Hanna Johansen (1939–2023, Germany/Switzerland, f/ch)
- Margaret Johansen (1923–2013, Norway, f)
- Edmund John (1883–1917, England/Italy, p)
- Elnathan John (born 1982, Nigeria, f/nf)
- Marie-Elena John (born 1963, Antigua/US, f)
- Nancy John (1924–2022, England, f), pseudonym of Nancy Buckingham and John Sawyer
- John of the Cross (1542–1591, Spain, p/nf), birth name Juan de Yepes y Álvarez
- John the Exarch (fl. 9th–10th c., Bulgaria, nf)
- John of Patmos (6–100 CE, Roman E, nf)
- Michael Johns (born 1964, US, nf)
- W. E. Johns (1893–1968, England, f)
- B. S. Johnson (1933–1973, England, f/p/nf)
- Denis Johnson (1949–2017, Germany/US, f/d/p)
- E. Pauline Johnson (1861–1913, Canada, p/f)
- Electa Amanda Wright Johnson (1838–1929, US, nf)
- Eyvind Johnson (1900–1976, Sweden, f)
- George Clayton Johnson (1929–2015, US, f/d)
- Georgia Douglas Johnson (1880–1966, US, p/d)
- Helene Johnson (1906–1995, US, p)
- Irving Johnson (1905–1991, US, nf)
- James Weldon Johnson (1871–1938, US, p/nf)
- Jane Johnson (born 1960, England/Morocco, f/ch)
- Joanne Johnson (born 1977, England, nf)
- Lemuel Johnson (1941–2002, Sierra Leone, nf/p)
- Linton Kwesi Johnson (born 1952, Jamaica/England, p)
- Lionel Johnson (1867–1902, England, p/nf)
- Maureen Johnson (born 1973, US, f/ch)
- Paul Johnson (1928–2023, England, nf/f)
- Rebecca Johnson (born 1966, Australia, ch/f)
- Rossiter Johnson (1840–1931, US, nf)
- Samuel Johnson (1649–1703, England, nf)
- Samuel Johnson (1691–1773, England, d)
- Samuel Johnson (1709–1784, England, p/d/nf)
- Samuel Johnson (1846–1901, Sierra Leone/Nigeria, nf)
- Stephanie Johnson (born 1961, N Zealand, p/d/f)
- Susan Johnson (born 1939, US, f)
- Uwe Johnson (1934–1984, Germany, f)
- Alexa Johnston (living, N Zealand, nf/ch)
- Andrew Johnston (born 1963, N Zealand, p/nf)
- Annie Fellows Johnston (1863–1931, US, ch)
- Antony Johnston (born 1972, England, f)
- Christine Johnston (born 1950, f)
- Dorothy Johnston (born 1948, Australia, f/nf)
- George Benson Johnston (1913–2004, Canada, p/nf)
- James Johnston (1851–1921, Scotland/Jamaica, nf)
- Joan Johnston (living, US, f)
- Linda O. Johnston (living, US, f)
- Maria I. Johnston (1835–1921, US, f/nf)
- Martin Johnston (1947–1990, p/f)
- Hanns Johst (1890–1978, Germany, p/d)
- Jean de Joinville (1224–1317, France, nf)
- Anna Jókai (1932–2017, Hungary, f/p)
- Mór Jókai (1825–1904, Hungary, f/d)
- Elísabet Jökulsdóttir (born 1958, Iceland, p/nf/d)
- Eugene Jolas (1894–1945, US, nf)
- Elizabeth Jolley (1923–2007, England/Australia, f/nf)
- Arthur M. Jolly (born 1969, England/US, d)
- Ragnhild Jølsen (1875–1908, Norway, f)
- Jón Atli Jónasson (born 1972, Iceland, d)
- Kristján B. Jónasson (living, Iceland, nf)
- Óskar Jónasson (born 1963, Iceland, d)
- Ragnar Jónasson (born 1976, Iceland, f)
- Alice Gray Jones (1852–1943, Wales, p/nf), pseudonym Ceridwen Peris
- Bedwyr Lewis Jones (1933–1992, Wales, nf)
- Bobi Jones (1929–2017, Wales, nf/f/p)
- Catherine Jones (born 1956, England, f), collaborative pseudonym Annie Jones
- Charlotte Jones (born 1968, England, d)
- D. Gwenallt Jones (1899–1968, Wales, p/nf)
- David Jones (1895–1974, England, p)
- Dafydd Jones (1803–1868, Wales, p)
- Dennis Feltham Jones (1918–1981, England, f)
- Diana Wynne Jones (1934–2011, England, f/p/nf)
- Dic Jones (1934–2009, Wales, p)
- E. B. C. Jones (1893–1966, England, f)
- Ebenezer Jones (1820–1860, England, p)
- Eldred D. Jones (1925–2020, Sierra Leone, nf)
- Ernest Jones (1879–1958, Wales/England, nf)
- Evan Jones (1931–2022, Australia, p)
- Gail Jones (born 1965, Australia, f/nf)
- Glyn Jones (1905–1995, Wales, f/p/nf)
- Gwilym R. Jones (1903–1993, Wales, p/nf)
- Henry Festing Jones (1851–1928, England, nf)
- Jack Jones (1884–1970, Wales, f/d)
- Jill Jones (born 1951, Australia, p)
- John Jones (1766–1821, Wales, p/nf)
- John Joseph Jones (1930–2000, England/Australia, p/d)
- John Robert Jones (1911–1970, Wales, nf)
- Kathleen Jones (born 1946, England, p/nf)
- Landon Jones (living, US, nf)
- Lara Jones (1975–2010, England, ch)
- Laura Jones (born 1951, Australia, d)
- Lewis Jones (1837–1904, Wales/Argentina, nf)
- Lloyd Jones (born 1951, Wales, p/f)
- Lloyd Jones (born 1955, N Zealand, f)
- Margaret Jones (1842–1902, Wales/Australia), pseudonym Y Gymraes o Ganaan
- Margaret Jones (1923–2006, Australia, nf)
- Marcia Jones (born 1958, US, ch)
- Marion Patrick Jones (1931–2016, Trinidad, f/nf)
- Mary Vaughan Jones (1918–1983, Wales, ch)
- Rae Desmond Jones (1941–2017, Australia, p/f)
- Raymond F. Jones (1915–1994, US, f)
- Richard Jones (England/US, p/nf)
- Sally Roberts Jones (born 1935, England/Wales, p/nf)
- T. Gwynn Jones (1871–1949, Wales, p/nf/f)
- T. Llew Jones (1915–2009, Wales, ch)
- Terry Jones (1942–2020, Wales, d/p)
- Thom Jones (1945–2016, US, f)
- Thomas Jones of Denbigh (1756–1820, Wales, nf/p)
- Tim Jones (born 1959, N Zealand, f/p)
- V. M. Jones, (born 1958, N Zealand, ch)
- Ingrid Jonker (1933–1965, S Africa, p)
- Ágústína Jónsdóttir (born 1949, Iceland, p)
- Áslaug Jónsdóttir (born 1963, Iceland, ch/d)
- Auður Jónsdóttir (born 1973, Iceland, f/d)
- Birgitta Jónsdóttir (born 1967, Iceland, p)
- Ben Jonson (1572–1637, England, d/p)
- Arngrímur Jónsson (1568–1648, Iceland, nf)
- Karl Jónsson (1135–1213, Iceland, nf/p)
- Finnur Jónsson (1858–1934, Iceland, nf)
- Gísli Rúnar Jónsson (1953–2020, Iceland, d)
- Magnús Jónsson (c. 1530–1591, Iceland, p)
- Magnús Jónsson í Tjaldanesi (1835–1922, Iceland, nf)
- Tony Jónsson (1921–2001, Iceland, nf)
- Tor Jonsson (1916–1951, Norway, p/f/nf)
- Alieu Ebrima Cham Joof (1924–2011, Gambia, nf)
- Joseph Henry Joof (born 1960, Gambia, nf)
- Archibald Campbell Jordan (1906–1968, S Africa/US, f/nf)
- June Jordan (1936–2002, US, p/nf)
- Penny Jordan (1946–2011, England, f), pseudonym of Penelope Jones Halsall
- Robert Jordan (1948–2007, US, f)
- Sherryl Jordan (born 1949, N Zealand, ch)
- Toni Jordan (born 1966, Australia, f)
- William Chester Jordan (born 1948, US, nf)
- Ludmilla Jordanova (born 1949, England, nf)
- Lídia Jorge (born 1946, Portugal, f/ch/d)
- Pierre Joris (born 1946, Luxembourg, p/nf)
- Jórunn skáldmær (1st half of 10th c., Iceland, p)
- Ari Jósefsson (1939–1964, Iceland, p)
- Anthony Joseph (born 1966, Trinidad and Tobago, p/f/nf)
- Helen Joseph (1905–1992, England/S Africa, nf)
- Jenny Joseph (1932–2018, England, p/f)
- M. K. Joseph (1914–1981, N Zealand, p/f)
- Marica Josimčević (born 1946, Yugoslavia, f/d)
- Rebecca Richardson Joslin (1846–1934, US, nf)
- Ralph Josselin (1616–1683, England, nf)
- Abderrafi Jouahri (born 1943, Morocco, nf/p)
- Abdelkarim Jouaiti (born 1962, Morocco, f)
- Elsa Joubert (1922–2020, S Africa, f/nf)
- Gideon Joubert (1923–2010, S Africa, nf)
- Alice Jouenne (1873–1954, France, nf)
- Jean Joubert (1928–2015, France, f/p)
- Jacques Jouet (born 1947, France, f/d/nf)
- Alain Jouffroy (1928–2015, France, nf/p)
- Ahmed Joumari (1939–1995, Morocco, p)
- Pierre Jean Jouve (1887–1976, France, f/p)
- Biljana Jovanović (1953–1996, Yugoslavia/Serbia, p/f/d)
- Djordje Jovanović (1909–1943, Serbia/Yugoslavia, p/nf)
- Lazar Jovanović (fl. 1835–1853, Ottoman E, nf)
- Rade Jovanović (born 1971, Yugoslavia/Serbia, p/ch)
- Slobodan Jovanović (1869–1958, Austria-Hungary/England, nf)
- Vladimir Jovanović (1833–1922, Serbia/Yugoslavia, nf)
- Vojislav V. Jovanović (1940–2018, Yugoslavia/Serbia, f/p)
- Danilo Jovanovitch (1919–2015, Australia, p)
- Meto Jovanovski (1928–2016, Yugoslavia/N Macedonia, f/ch)
- Proka Jovkić (1886–1915, Austria-Hungary/Serbia, p/nf)
- Malalai Joya (born 1978, Afghanistan, nf)
- Brenda Joyce (born c. 1963, US, f)
- Graham Joyce (1954–2014, England, f)
- James Joyce (1882–1941, Ireland/Italy, f/p/nf)
- Attila József (1905–1937, Hungary, p)

== Ju–Jy ==
- Ju (born 1958, Burma/Myanmar, f)
- Mireille Juchau (born 1969, Australia, f/d)
- Alan Judd (born 1946, England, f/nf), pseudonym of Alan Edwin Petty
- Mary Catherine Judd (1852–1937, US, f/nf)
- Frank Judge (1946–2021, US, p/nf)
- Tony Judt (1948–2010, England/US, nf)
- Aleksandar Jugović (born 1975, Yugoslavia/Serbia, nf)
- Ferenc Juhász (1928–2015, Hungary, p)
- Gyula Juhász (1883–1937, Hungary, p)
- Gyula Juhász (1930–1993, Hungary, nf)
- William Juhasz (1899–1967, Hungary/US, nf), born Vilmos Haas
- Jacqueline Jules (born 1956, US, f/nf/ch)
- Julian of Norwich (1343 – post-1416, England, nf)
- Charles Juliet (born 1934, France, p/d/f)
- Kristjan Niels Julius (1860–1936, Iceland/US, p)
- Miranda July (born 1974, US, d/f/nf)
- Jamal Jumá (living, Iraq/Denmark, p/f)
- Jung Chang (張戎, born 1952, China, nf)
- Carl Jung (1875–1961, Switzerland, nf)
- Johann Heinrich Jung (1740–1817, Germany, nf), pseudonym Heinrich Stilling
- Ernst Jünger (1895–1998, Germany, nf)
- Christian Jungersen (born 1962, Denmark, f)
- Peter Stephan Jungk (born 1952, US, f)
- Robert Jungk (1913–1994, Austria, nf), pseudonym of Robert Baum
- Penny Junor (born 1949, England, nf)
- Guerra Junqueiro (1850–1923, Portugal, nf/p)
- Josip Jurčič (1844–1881, Austrian E, f)
- Daniel C. Juster (born 1947, US/Israel, nf)
- Norton Juster (1929–2021, US, ch)
- Donald Justice (1925–2004, US, p/nf)
- Justin Martyr (c. 100 – c. 165, Judea/Roman E, nf)
- May Justus (1898–1989, US, ch)
- Povel Juel (c. 1673–1723, Norway/Denmark, nf)
- Juvenal (fl. late 1st – early 2nd c. CE, Roman E, p), full name Decimus Junius Juvenalis
- Lizzie Juvkam (1883–1969, Norway, f)
- Ibn Juzayy (1321–1357, Andalusia, p/nf)
- Mišo Juzmeski (born 1966, Yugoslavia/N Macedonia, f/nf)
- Andreas Jynge (1870–1955, Norway, p/nf)
