= List of writers by name: I =

The following is a List of writers by name whose last names begin with I:

Abbreviations: ch = children's; d = drama, screenwriting; f = fiction; nf = non-fiction; p = poetry, song lyrics

- Lee Iacocca (1924–2019, US, nf)
- Iamblichus (c. 245–325 CE, Syria, nf)
- Paolo Iashvili (1894–1937, Russian E/USSR, p)
- Juana de Ibarbourou (1892–1979, Uruguay, p)
- Jorge Ibargüengoitia (1928–1983, Mexico, f/d)
- Carlos Ibarguren (1877–1956, Argentina, nf)
- Eva Ibbotson (1925–2010, Austria/England, f/ch)
- Abubakar Adam Ibrahim (born 1979, Nigeria, f)
- Fatima Ahmed Ibrahim (c. 1930–2017, Sudan, nf)
- Hafez Ibrahim (1871–1932, Egypt, p)
- Nilima Ibrahim (1921–2002, India/Bangladesh, nf/f/d)
- Salah Ahmed Ibrahim (1933–1993, Sudan, p/f)
- Sonallah Ibrahim (1937–2025, Egypt, f)
- Henrik Ibsen (1828–1906, Norway, d)
- Masuji Ibuse (井伏鱒二, 1898–1983, Japan, f)
- Ibycus (2nd half of 6th c. BCE, Rhegium, p)
- Issan Ichinei (一山 一寧, 1247–1317, China/Japan, nf), name pronounced Yishan Yining in Chinese
- Adamou Idé (born 1951, Niger, p/f)
- Ibn Idhari (early 14th c., Morocco, nf)
- Ido Reizan (井土霊山, 1859–1935, Japan, nf/p)
- Yusuf Idris (1927–1991, Egypt, d/f)
- Efraín Jara Idrovo (1926–2018, Ecuador, p/nf)
- Emmanuel Iduma (born 1989, Nigeria, nf)
- Dafydd Ifans (born 1949, Wales, f)
- Ife Piankhi (living, Uganda, p)
- August Wilhelm Iffland (1759–1814, Germany, d)
- Jordan Ifueko (born 1993, Nigeria/US, f/ch)
- Conn Iggulden (born 1971, England, f)
- Ignatius of Antioch (c. 108–140 CE, Roman E, nf)
- Jakov Ignjatović (1822–1889, Serbia, f/nf)
- Ignotus (1869–1949, Hungary, p/f/nf), pseudonym of Hugó Veigelsberg
- Ihara Saikaku (井原西鶴, 1642–1693, Japan, p/f)
- Witi Ihimaera (born 1944, N Zealand, f)
- Dakotsu Iida (飯田蛇笏, 1885–1962, Japan, p)
- Shōtarō Ikenami (池波正太郎, 1823–1890, Japan, f)
- Natsuki Ikezawa (池澤夏樹, born 1945, Japan, p/f/nf)
- Ikkyū (一休宗純, 1394–1481, Japan, nf/p)
- Nnanna Ikpo (living, Nigeria, f)
- Ejikeme Ikwunze (living, Nigeria, nf)
- Monique Ilboudo (born 1959, Burkina Faso, nf/f)
- Rıfat Ilgaz (1911–1993, Turkey, f/nf)
- Attilâ İlhan (1925–2005, Turkey, p/f/nf)
- Immaculée Ilibagiza (born 1972, Rwanda/US, nf/f)
- Branislava Ilić (born 1970, Yugoslavia/Serbia, d/nf)
- Dragutin Ilić (1858–1926, Serbia/Yugoslavia, d/p/f)
- Jovan Ilić (1824–1901, Serbia, p)
- Vojislav Ilić (1860–1894, Serbia, p)
- Kalin Iliev (born 1956, Bulgaria, d/nf)
- Vasil Iljoski (1902–1995, Ottoman E/N Macedonia, d/nf)
- Theodor Illek (born 1984, Slovenia, p/d/nf)
- Gyula Illyés (1902–1983, Hungary, p/f)
- Maria Ilnicka (1825 or 1827–1897, Duchy of Warsaw, p/f/nf)
- Raquel Ilombé (1938–1992, Equatorial Guinea, p/ch)
- Abubakar Imam (1911–1981, Nigeria, nf)
- Jahanara Imam (1929–1994, India/Bangladesh, nf/f)
- Neamat Imam (born 1971, E Pakistan/Canada, f/d/p)
- Eghosa Imasuen (born 1976, Nigeria, f)
- Francis D. Imbuga (1947–2012, Kenya, f/d/nf)
- Chris Impey (born 1956, Scotland/US, nf)
- Inagaki Manjirō (稲垣満次郎, 1861–1908, Japan, nf)
- Taruho Inagaki (稲垣足穂, 1900–1977, Japan, f)
- Sabit İnce (born 1954, Turkey, p/nf)
- Elizabeth Inchbald (1753–1821, England, f/d)
- Hans-Ulrich Indermaur (born 1939, nf)
- Mirjam Indermaur (born 1967, Switzerland, nf)
- Arnaldur Indriðason (born 1961, Iceland, f)
- Dean Ing (1931–2020, US, f)
- Rex Ingamells (1913–1955, Australia, p/f/nf)
- William Ralph Inge (1860–1954, England, nf), known as Dean Inge
- Per Jan Ingebrigtsen (born 1946, Norway, p/ch/f)
- Jean Ingelow (1820–1897, England, p/f)
- Ingen (隠元隆琦, 1592–1673, Japan, nf/p)
- José Ingenieros (1877–1925, Argentina, nf)
- Marilla Baker Ingalls (1828–1902, United States/Burma, nf)
- Elisabeth Inglis-Jones (1900–1994, Wales/England, f/nf)
- Heather Ingman (born 1953, England, nf/f)
- Thomas Ingoldsby (1788–1845, England, f/p), pseudonym of Richard Barham
- Viktor Arnar Ingólfsson (born 1955, Iceland, f)
- Anton Ingolič (1907–1992, Austrian E/Yugoslavia)
- Laura Ingraham (born 1963, US, nf)
- Anne Bower Ingram (1937–2010, Australia, ch)
- Simon Ings (born 1965, England, f/nf)
- Frid Ingulstad (1935–2026, Norway, f/nf/ch)
- Dimitar Inkiow (1932–2006, Bulgaria, d/f)
- Mick Inkpen (born 1952, England, ch)
- Catherine Lucy Innes (c. 1840–1900, N Zealand, nf)
- Hammond Innes (1913–1998, England, f/ch/nf)
- Hisashi Inoue (井上ひさし, 1934–2010, Japan, d/f)
- Inoue Kenkabō (井上剣花坊, 1870–1934, Japan, p/nf)
- Yasushi Inoue (井上靖, 1907–1991, Japan, p/nf/f)
- Kurumi Inui (乾くるみ, born 1963, Japan, f)
- Eugène Ionesco (1909–1994, Romania/France, d)
- Nae Ionescu (1890–1940, Romania, nf)
- Nicolae Iorga (1871–1940, Romania, nf/p/d)
- Otia Ioseliani (1930–2011, USSR/Georgia, f/d)
- Tade Ipadeola (born 1970, Nigeria, p)
- Sylvia Iparraguirre (born 1947, Argentina, f)
- Muhammed Zafar Iqbal (1877–1938, India, p/nf)
- Mario Briceño Iragorry (1897–1958, Venezuela, f/nf)
- Julio Irazusta (1899–1982, Argentina, nf)
- Rodolfo Irazusta (1897–1967, Argentina, nf)
- Irenaeus (c. 130 – c. 202, Smyrna/Gaul, nf)
- Hermógenes Irisarri (1819–1896, Chile, p/nf)
- Irnerius (c. 1050 – post-1125, Italy, nf)
- Takehiro Irokawa (色川武大, 1929–1989, Japan, f)
- Eric Irvin (1908–1993, Australia, p/nf)
- Fanny Irvine-Smith (1878–1948, N Zealand, nf)
- John Irving (born 1942, US/Canada, f/d)
- Laurence Irving (1871–1914, England/Canada, d)
- Washington Irving (1783–1859, US, f/nf)
- Beatrice Irwin (1877–1953, India/US, nf), born Alice Beatrice Simpson
- Norah Isaac (1914–2003, Wales, f/nf/d)
- Jorge Isaacs (1837–1895, Colombia, p/f)
- Walter Isaacson (born 1952, US, nf)
- Salomon Isacovici (1924–1998, Romania/Ecuador, nf)
- Isaeus (early 4th c. BCE, Greece, nf)
- Avetik Isahakyan (1875–1957, Russian E/USSR, p/nf)
- Kōtarō Isaka (伊坂幸太郎, born 1971, Japan, f)
- Antonije Isaković (1923–2002, Yugoslavia, f/nf)
- Lady Ise (伊勢, c. 875 – c. 938, Japan, p)
- Moses Isegawa (born 1963, Uganda/Netherlands, f)
- Ibrahim Ishaq (1946–2021, Sudan, f/nf)
- Abu Ishaque (1926–2003, India/Bangladesh, f)
- Christopher Isherwood (1904–1986, England/US, f/d/nf)
- Ishibashi Ningetsu (石橋忍月, 1865–1926, Japan, nf)
- Ira Ishida (石田衣良, born 1960, Japan, f)
- Ishigaki Rin (石垣りん, 1920–2004, Japan, p)
- Kazuo Ishiguro (石黒一雄, born 1954, Japan/England, f/d)
- Naomi Ishiguro (born 1992, England, f)
- Fujio Ishihara (石原藤夫, born 1933, Japan, f/nf)
- Shintaro Ishihara (石原慎太郎, 1932–2022, Japan, f/nf)
- Jun Ishikawa (石川淳, 1899–1987, Japan, f/nf)
- Koji Ishikawa いしかわこうじ, born 1963, Japan, ch)
- Takuboku Ishikawa (石川啄木, 1886–1912, Japan, p)
- Tatsuzō Ishikawa (石川達三, 1905–1985, Japan, nf)
- Ishin Sūden (以心崇伝, 1569–1633, Japan, nf)
- Tomoji Ishizuka (石塚友二, 1906–1984, Japan, p/f)
- Elizabeth Isichei (born 1939, N Zealand/Nigeria, nf)
- Kazi Nazrul Islam (1899–1976, India/Bangladesh, p/f/nf)
- Auguste Villiers de l'Isle-Adam (1838–1889, France, p/f/d)
- Rashidah Ismaili (born 1941, Benin/US, p/nf)
- Isocrates (436–338 BCE, Greece, nf)
- Akinwunmi Isola (1939–2018, Nigeria, d/f/nf)
- Petre Ispirescu (1830–1887, Wallachia/Romania, nf)
- Jama Omar Issa (c. 1922–2014, Somalia, nf)
- Panait Istrati (1884–1935, Romania, nf/f)
- Einosuke Itō (伊藤 永之介, 1903–1959, Japan, nf)
- Hiromi Itō (伊藤比呂美, born 1955, Japan, p/nf)
- Junji Itō (伊藤潤二, born 1963, Japan, f)
- Keikaku Itō (Project Itoh 伊藤計劃, 1974–2009, Japan, f/nf)
- Itō Noe (伊藤野枝, 1895–1923, Japan, nf)
- Itō Sachio (伊藤左千夫, 1864–1913, Japan, p/f), pseudonym of Itō Kōjirō (伊藤幸次郎)
- Takami Itō (伊藤たかみ, born 1971, Japan, f/ch)
- Davina Itoo (born 1983, Mauritius, f)
- Akiko Itoyama (絲山秋子, born 1966, Japan, f)
- Edna Iturralde (born 1948, Ecuador, ch)
- Ivan Ivanić (1867–1935, Austria-Hungary/Yugoslavia, nf)
- Ivan Ivanji (born 1929, Yugoslavia/Austria, f)
- Alexandru Ivasiuc (1933–1977, Romania, f)
- T C Ivens (1921–1988, England, nf)
- George Cecil Ives (1867–1950, Germany/England, p/nf/f)
- Pavle Ivić (1924–1999, Yugoslavia, nf)
- Judith Ivory (living, US, f), pseudonym of Judy Cuveas
- Violeta Ivković (born 1957, Yugoslavia/Serbia, f)
- Emrys ap Iwan (1848–1906, Wales, nf),
- Wacław Iwaniuk (1912–2001, Poland/Canada, p/nf)
- Fernando Iwasaki (born 1961, Peru, f/nf)
- Jarosław Iwaszkiewicz (1894–1980, Russian E/Poland, p/d/nf)
- Uzodinma Iweala (born 1982, Nigeria, f)
- Festus Iyayi (1947–2013, Nigeria, f/nf)
- Benito Pastoriza Iyodo (1954–2022, Puerto Rico, p/f/nf)
- Boris Izaguirre (born 1965, Venezuela/Spain, f/nf)
- Motohiko Izawa (井沢元彦, born 1954, Japan, f)
- Sergey Izgiyayev (1922–1972, USSR, p/d)
- Jacques Izoard (1936–2008, Belgium, p/nf)
- Kyōka Izumi (泉鏡花, 1873–1939, Japan, f/d)
- Izumi Shikibu (和泉式部, born c. 976, Japan, p)
- Izumo no Okuni (出雲阿国, c. 1578–1613, Japan, d)
- Ralph Izzard (1910–1992, England, nf)
