= List of writers by name: Q =

The following is a List of writers by name whose last names begin with Q:

Abbreviations: ch = children's; d = drama, screenwriting; f = fiction; nf = non-fiction; p = poetry, song lyrics

- Nizar Qabbani (1923–1998, Syria, p/nf)
- Sayyid Ahmedullah Qadri (1909–1985, India, p/nf)
- Naser al-Din Shah Qajar (1831–1896, Persia, nf)
- Rawhiya al-Qallini (1915–1980, Egypt, p)
- Bachir Qamari (1951–2021, Morocco, nf/f/d)
- Abdel Hakim Qasem (1934–1990, Egypt, f)
- Najwa Qassem (1967–2020, Lebanon, nf)
- Aref Qazvini (1882–1934, Iran, p)
- Qian Xuantong (錢玄同, 1887–1939, China, nf)
- Qian Zhongshu (錢鍾書, 1910–1998, China, f/nf)
- Qiao Ji (喬吉, died 1345, China, d/p)
- Qin Hui (秦檜, 1090–1155, China, nf)
- Qin Jiushao (秦九韶, c. 1202–1261, China, nf)
- Li Qingzhao (李清照, 1084 – c. 1155 or 1081 – c. 1141, China, p/nf)
- Qiu Jin (秋瑾, 1875–1907, China, p/nf)
- Qu Bo (曲波, 1923–2002, China, f/nf/p)
- Qu Yuan (屈原, c. 340–278 BC, China, p)
- Qu You (瞿佑, 1341–1427, China, f/p)
- Robert Quackenbush (1929–2021, US, ch)
- Roberto Quaglia (born 1962, Italy, f)
- Bernard Quaritch (1819–1899, Germany/England, nf)
- Francis Quarles (1592–1644, England, p)
- Paul Quarrington (1953–2010, Canada, f/d)
- Alissa Quart (born 1972, US, nf/p)
- Kwei Quartey (living, Ghana/US, f)
- Marjorie Quarton (born 1930, Ireland, f)
- Salvatore Quasimodo (1901–1968, Italy, p)
- Ato Quayson (born 1961, Ghana/US, nf)
- Ihsan Abdel Quddous (1919–1990, Egypt, f/d)
- José Martínez Queirolo (1931–2008, Ecuador, d)
- José Maria de Eça de Queirós (1845–1900, Portugal/France, f)
- Eça de Queiroz (1845–1900, Portugal/France, f/nf)
- Rachel de Queiroz (1910–2003, Brazil, f/d/nf)
- Raymond Queneau (1903–1976, France, f/p/nf)
- C. H. B. Quennell (1872–1935, England, nf)
- Marjorie Quennell (1884–1972, England, ch)
- Peter Quennell (1905–1993, England, nf/p)
- Antero de Quental (1842–1891, Portugal, p/nf)
- Erica Quest (1924–2022, England, f), joint pseudonym of Nancy Buckingham and John Sawyer
- Francisco de Quevedo (1580–1645, Spain, p/f/nf)
- Jules Quicherat (1814–1882, France, nf)
- Amanda Quick (born 1948, US, f), pseudonym of Jayne Ann Krentz
- Matthew Quick (born 1973, US, f/ch)
- Alison Quigan (born 1952, N Zealand, d)
- Carroll Quigley (1910–1977, US, nf)
- John Quigley (1925–2021, Scotland, f)
- Sarah Quigley (born 1967, N Zealand, f/p/nf)
- Isabel Quigly (1926–2018, Spain/England, f)
- Eduardo Quiles (born 1940, Spain, d/f)
- Arthur Quiller-Couch (1863–1944, England, f/nf)
- Mabel Quiller-Couch (c. 1866–1924, England, nf/ch)
- Edward Quillinan (1791–1851, Portugal/England, p)
- Ann Quin (1936–1973, England, f)
- Betty Quin (1920s–1993, Australia, d)
- Tarella Quin (1877–1934, Australia, ch/f)
- Philippe Quinault (1635–1688, France, d)
- Thomas De Quincey (1785–1859, England/Scotland, nf)
- John Quincy (died 1722, England, nf)
- Anna Quindlen (born 1952, US, nf)
- Willard Van Orman Quine (1908–2000, US, nf)
- Anthony Quiney (born 1935, England, nf)
- Anthony Quinn (1915–2001, Mexico/US, nf), pseudonym of Manuel Antonio Rodolfo Quinn Oaxaca
- Julia Quinn (born 1969, US, f), pseudonym of Julie Pottinger, born Cotler
- Roderic Quinn (1867–1949, Australia, p/f)
- A. J. Quinnell (1940–2005, England, f), pseudonym of Philip Nicholson
- Ernesto Quiñonez (born 1969, Ecuador/US, f)
- Mário Quintana (1906–1994, Brazil, p)
- Rebeca Quintáns (born 1964, Spain, nf)
- Raúl Quinto (born 1978, Spain, p)
- Anthony Quinton (1925–2010, England, nf)
- Charles Le Quintrec (1926–2008, France, p)
- Randolph Quirk (1920–2017, Isle of Man/England, nf)
- Elena Quiroga (1921–1995, Spain, nf)
- Horacio Quiroga (1878–1937, Uruguay/Argentina, d/p/f)
- Christine Qunta (born 1952, S Africa, p/nf)
- Sayyid Qutb (1906–1966, Egypt, f/nf/p)
- Anne Margrethe Qvitzow (1652–1700, Denmark, p/nf)
