= Laura Sintija Černiauskaitė =

Lithuanian writer (born 1976)

Laura Sintija Černiauskaitė (born 1976) is a Lithuanian writer. Born in Vilnius, she studied Lithuanian language and literature at Vilnius University. She worked at a number of magazines afterwards.

She has written a number of plays, including Liberate the Golden Foal (Išlaisvink auksinį kumeliuką, 2001) and Liučė Skates (Liučė čiuožia, 2003). Liučė Skates won the first prize in an international drama festival held in Berlin in 2004. A collection of her prose and drama (also titled Liučė Skates) was published in 2003, and was selected as one of the 12 best books of the year by the Lithuanian Literature Institute.

Her debut novel Kvėpavimas į marmurą (Breathing into Marble, 2006) won the EU Prize for Literature in 2009, and has been translated into English.

Černiauskaitė is a member of the Lithuanian Writers' Union since 2004.
