= List of writers by name: U =

The following is a List of writers by name whose last names begin with U:

Abbreviations: ch = children's; d = drama, screenwriting; f = fiction; nf = non-fiction; p = poetry, song lyrics

- Abdón Ubidia (born 1944, Ecuador, f/nf)
- Tow Ubukata (冲方丁, born 1977, Singapore/Japan, f/d)
- Hyakken Uchida (内田百間, 1889–1971, Japan, f/nf)
- Uchimura Kanzō (内村鑑三, 1861–1930, Japan, nf)
- Brady Udall (born 1971, US, f)
- Ueda Akinari (上田秋成, 1734–1809, Japan, f/nf/p)
- Makoto Ueda (上田真, 1931–2020, Japan, nf)
- Makoto Ueda (植田実, born 1935, Japan, nf)
- Uemura Shōen (上村松園, 1875–1949, Japan, nf)
- Úlfr Uggason (fl. late 10th c. CE, Iceland, p)
- Jenny Uglow (born 1947, England, nf)
- Dubravka Ugrešić (1949–2023, Yugoslavia/Netherlands, f/nf)
- Pavle Ugrinov (1926–2007, Yugoslavia/Serbia, f/nf/d)
- Ludwig Uhland (1787–1862, Germany, p/nf)
- Kornel Ujejski (1823–1897, Austria-Hungary, p/nf)
- Erzsi Újvári (1899–1940, Hungary/Soviet Union, p)
- Adaora Lily Ulasi (born 1932, Nigeria, nf/f)
- Laura Ulewicz (1930–2007, US, p)
- Gul Pacha Ulfat (1909–1977, Afghanistan, nf/p)
- James Ramsey Ullman (1907–1971, US, nf/f)
- Linn Ullmann (born 1966, Norway, f/nf)
- Regina Ullmann (1884–1961, Switzerland/Germany, p/f)
- Claudia Ulloa (born 1979, Peru, f/nf)
- Volker Ullrich (born 1943, Germany, nf)
- Ulrich von Liechtenstein (c. 1200–1275, Austria, p)
- Ulrich von Zatzikhoven (fl. early 13th c., Switzerland, f)
- Tor Ulven (1953–1995, Norway, p)
- Rems Umeasiegbu (born 1943, Nigeria, f/nf/p)
- Kazuo Umezu (楳図かずお, born 1936, Japan, f)
- Luz María Umpierre (born 1947, Puerto Rico/US, nf/p)
- Thrity Umrigar (born 1961, India, f)
- Marie Béatrice Umutesi (born 1959, Rwanda/Belgium, nf)
- Miguel de Unamuno (1864–1936, Spain, nf/f/p)
- Evelyn Underhill (1875–1941, England, nf/p/f)
- Edna W. Underwood (1873–1961, US, f/p)
- Peter Underwood (1923–2014, England, nf)
- Terry Underwood (born 1944, Australia, nf)
- Wilbur Underwood (1874–1935, US, p)
- Sigrid Undset (1882–1949, Norway, f)
- Loung Ung (born 1970, Cambodia, nf)
- Hermann Ungar (1893–1929, Austrian E/Czechoslovakia, f/nf/d)
- Giuseppe Ungaretti (1888–1970, Italy, p/nf)
- Andrew Unger (born 1979, Canada, f)
- Lisa Unger (born 1970, US, f)
- Tomi Ungerer (1931–2019, France/Ireland, ch/f/nf)
- Alix d'Unienville (1918–2015, Mauritius, nf)
- Chika Unigwe (born 1974, Nigeria/US, f/nf)
- Unno Juza (海野十三, 1897–1949, Japan, f)
- Abhimanyu Unnuth (1937–2018, Mauritius, f/p/nf)
- Fritz von Unruh (1893–1929, Germany, d/p/f)
- Barry Unsworth (1930–2012, England/Italy, f)
- Cathi Unsworth (living, England, f)
- Emma Jane Unsworth (born 1978, England, f)
- Simon Kurt Unsworth (born 1972, England, f)
- Louis Untermeyer (1885–1977, US, p/nf)
- Harilal Upadhyay (1916–1994, India, f/p)
- Samrat Upadhyay (born 1963, Nepal/US, f)
- John Updike (1932–2009, US, f/p/nf)
- Andrejs Upīts (1877–1970, Russian E/USSR, p/f/nf)
- Kristofer Uppdal (1878–1961, Norway, p/nf)
- Nicola Upson (born 1970, England, f)
- Florence Kate Upton (1873–1922, US/England, ch)
- Allen Upward (1863–1926, England, p/f/nf)
- Edward Upward (1903–2009, England, f/nf)
- Mark Urban (born 1961, England, nf)
- Milo Urban (1904–1982, Hungary/Czechoslovakia, f/nf)
- Grigore Ureche (1590–1647, Moldavia, nf)
- Pedro Henríquez Ureña (1884–1946, Dominican Rep., nf)
- Salomé Ureña (1850–1898, Dominican Rep., p/nf)
- Honoré d'Urfé (1568–1625, France, f/nf)
- Leon Uris (1924–2003, US, f)
- Urmuz (1883–1923, Romania, f/p), pseudonym of Demetru Dem. Demetrescu-Buzău
- Gen Urobuchi (虚淵玄, born 1972, Japan, f/d)
- Francisco Urondo (1930–1976, Argentina, p/f/nf)
- Jane Urquhart (born 1949, Canada, f/nf/p)
- Jessie Urquhart (1890–1948, Australia/England, f/nf)
- Igor Ursenco (born 1971, Soviet Union/Romania, p/f/nf)
- Anne Ursu (living, US, ch)
- José Coronel Urtecho (1906–1994, Nicaragua/Costa Rica, p/nf/d)
- Else Ury (1877–1943, Germany, f/ch), Holocaust victim
- Halid Ziya Uşaklıgil (1866–1945, Ottoman E/Turkey, f/p/d)
- Dragan Uskoković (born 1950, Yugoslavia/Serbia, d/f)
- Milutin Uskoković (1884–1915, Serbia, f)
- Eduard Uspensky (1937–2018, USSR/Russia, ch/p/d)
- James Ussher (1581–1656, Ireland, nf)
- Yoshimi Usui (臼井吉見, 1905–1987, Japan, f/nf)
- Ognjeslav Utješenović (1817–1890, Austrian E, p)
- Freda Utley (1898–1978, England/US, nf)
- Alison Uttley (1884–1976, England, ch/nf)
- Amy Uyematsu (1947–2023, US, p/nf)
- Bob den Uyl (1930–1992, Netherlands, f/nf)
- Johann Uz (1720–1796, Germany, p)
- Mehmed Uzun (1953–2007, Turkey, f)
- Buket Uzuner (born 1955, Turkey, f/nf)
