= List of writers by name: X =

The following is a List of writers by name whose last names begin with X:

Abbreviations: ch = children's; d = drama, screenwriting; f = fiction; nf = non-fiction; p = poetry, song lyrics

- Malcolm X (1925–1965, US, nf)
- Xenarchus of Seleucia (1st c. BCE, Greece, nf)
- Xenokleides (fl. 4th c. BCE, Greece, p)
- Xenophanes (c. 570 – c. 478 BCE, Greece, nf/p)
- Xenophon (c. 430–354 BCE, Athens, nf)
- Xi Xi (西西, 1937–2022, China/Hong Kong, nf)
- Xia Jia (夏笳, born 1984, China, f), pseudonym of Wang Yao (王瑶)
- Xiao Hong (蕭紅, 1911–1942, China, f/nf)
- Xiao Jun (蕭軍, 1907–1988, China, f)
- Qiu Xiaolong (裘小龙, born 1953, China, f/p/nf)
- Xie Bingying (謝冰瑩, 1906–2000, China, nf)
- Xie Daoyun (謝道韞, pre-340 – post-399 CE, China, nf)
- Xie He (謝赫, fl. 6th c., China, nf)
- Xie Lingyun (謝靈運, 385–433, China, p)
- Xin Qiji (辛棄疾, 1140–1207, China, p)
- Xinran (薛欣然, born 1958, China/England, nf)
- Xiong Shili (熊十力, 1885–1968, China, nf)
- Xiong Qinglai (熊慶來, 1893–1969, China, nf)
- Cali Xuseen Xirsi (1946–2005, Somalia/US, p/d)
- Uanhenga Xitu (1924–2012, Angola, nf), pseudonym of Agostinho André Mendes de Carvalho
- Jakov Xoxa (1923–1979, Albania/Hungary, p/f)
- Xu Dishan (許地山, 1893 or 1894–1941, China, nf)
- Empress Xu (徐皇后, 1362–1407, China, nf)
- Xu Guangqi (徐光啓, 1562–1633, China, nf)
- Xu Hui (徐惠, 627–650, China, p)
- Xu Kun (徐坤, born 1965, China, f)
- Xu Wei (徐渭, 1521–1593, China, p/nf/d)
- Wendy Xu (born 1987, US, p)
- Xu Xiake (徐霞客, 1587–1641, China, nf)
- Xu Youyu (徐友漁, born 1947, China, nf)
- Xu Zaisi (徐再思, fl. 14th c., China, p)
- Xu Zhimo (徐志摩, 1897–1931, China, p)
- Xu Zihua (徐自华, 1873–1935, China, p)
- Duchess Mu of Xu (許穆夫人, fl. 7th c. BCE, China, p)
- Empress Xu (徐皇后, 1362–1407, China, nf)
- Halima Xudoyberdiyeva (1947–2018, USSR/Uzbekistan, p)
- Xue Juzheng (薛居正, c. 912–981, China, nf)
- Xue Susu (薛素素, c. 1564 – c. 1650, China, p)
- Xue Tao (薛濤, c. 770–832, China, p)
- Xue Xinran (薛欣然, born 1958, China/England, nf/f)
- Xue Zongzheng (薛宗正, born 1935, China, nf)
- Xun Kuang (荀況, c. 310 or c. 314 – c. 235 or 217 BCE, China, nf)
