= List of writers by name: O =

The following is a List of writers by name whose last names begin with O:

Abbreviations: ch = children's; d = drama, screenwriting; f = fiction; nf = non-fiction; p = poetry, song lyrics

== Oa/Ok ==
- Rachid O. (Morocco/France, f)
- Ann Oakley (born 1944, England, nf/f)
- Graham Oakley (1929–2022, England, ch)
- John Oakman (c. 1748–1793, England, f/nf)
- María Olimpia de Obaldía (1891–1985, Panama, p)
- Barack Obama (born 1961, US, nf)
- Michelle Obama (born 1964, US, nf)
- Kate O'Beirne (1949–2017, US, nf)
- Nadège Noële Ango-Obiang (born 1973, Gabon, f/d/p)
- Chigozie Obioma (born 1986, Nigeria/US, f)
- Obiwu (born 1962, Nigeria/US, nf), full name Obioma Paul Iwuanyanwu
- Rafael Obligado (1851–1920, Argentina, p/d)
- Godspower Oboido (born 1988, Nigeria, p/nf)
- Dositej Obradović (1739–1811, Habsburg E/Ottoman E, nf)
- Téa Obreht (born 1985, Yugoslavia/US, f/nf)
- Princess Anka Obrenović (1821–1868, Serbia, nf)
- Tor Obrestad (1938–2020, Norway, f/p/nf)
- Patrick O'Brian (1914–2000, England/Ireland, f), born Richard Patrick Russ
- Fitz James O'Brien (1828–1862, Ireland/US, f/p)
- Flann O'Brien (1911–1966, Ireland, f/nf)
- John O'Brien (1878–1952, Australia, p/nf), pseudonym of Patrick Joseph Hartigan
- Michael O'Brien (born 1948, Canada, f/nf)
- Robert C. O'Brien (1918–1973, US, f)
- Sean O'Brien (born 1952, England, p/nf/d)
- Sigbjørn Obstfelder (1866–1900, Norway, p/f/nf)
- Mary-Louise O'Callaghan (living, Australia, nf)
- Luis Moreno Ocampo (born 1952, Argentina, etc., nf)
- Silvina Ocampo (1903–1993, Argentina, f/p)
- Victoria Ocampo (1890–1979, Argentina, nf)
- Thomas Occleve or Hoccleve (c. 1368–1426, England, p)
- Raquel Ochoa (born 1980, Portugal, f/nf)
- Moses Ochonu (living, Nigeria/US, nf)
- Tyne O'Connell (born 1960, England, f/ch)
- Elizabeth O'Conner (1913–2000, Australia, f/nf)
- Arthur O'Connor (1763–1852, Ireland/France, nf)
- Flannery O'Connor (1925–1964, US, f/nf)
- Mark O'Connor (born 1945, Australia, p/nf)
- Mary-Anne O'Connor (living, Australia, f)
- Philip O'Connor (1916–1998, England/France, nf)
- Roger O'Connor (1762–1834, Ireland/England, f/nf)
- Okello Oculi (1942–2025, Uganda/Nigeria, p/nf)
- Julius Ocwinyo (born 1961, Uganda, p/f)
- Sakunosuke Oda (織田作之助, 1913–1947, Japan, f/d/nf)
- Asenath Bole Odaga (1937–2014, Kenya, f/d/ch)
- Rosemary O'Day (born 1945, England, nf)
- Constance O'Day-Flannery (living, US, f)
- Scott O'Dell (1898–1989, US, f/ch)
- Eisha Stephen Atieno Odhiambo (1945–2009, Kenya/US, nf)
- Yervant Odian (1869–1926, Ottoman E/Egypt, nf/d)
- Ike Odimegwu (living, Nigeria, nf)
- Jaramogi Oginga Odinga (1911–1994, Kenya, nf)
- Alexandru Odobescu (1834–1895, Wallachia/Romania, f/nf)
- Laurel O'Donnell (living, US, f)
- Mietta O'Donnell (1950–2001, Australia, nf)
- Bernard O'Dowd (1866–1953, Australia, p/nf)
- Dennis O'Driscoll (1954–2012, Ireland, p/nf)
- Antoni Edward Odyniec (1804–1885, Poland, p)
- Kenzaburō Ōe (大江健三郎, 1935–2023, Japan, f/nf)
- Héctor Germán Oesterheld (1919–1977 or later, Argentina, f)
- Maggie O'Farrell (born 1972, N Ireland/England, f)
- Ernest O'Ferrall (1881–1925, Australia, p/f/nf)
- Ron Offen (1930–2010, US, p/d/nf)
- Yōko Ogawa (小川洋子, born 1962, Japan, f/nf)
- Elisabeth Ogilvie (1917–2006, US, f/nf/ch)
- Ian Ogilvy (born 1943, England, d/f)
- William Henry Ogilvie (1869–1963, Scotland, p/f)
- Ogiwara Seisensui (荻原井泉水, 1884–1976, Japan, p)
- Finn Øglænd (born 1957, Norway, p/f/ch)
- Kormákr Ögmundarson (fl. 10th c., Iceland, p)
- Dejan Ognjanović (born 1973, Yugoslavia/Montenegro)
- Vida Ognjenović (born 1941, Yugoslavia/Serbia, d/nf)
- Margaret Ogola (1958–2011, Kenya, f)
- Grace Ogot (1930–2015, Kenya, f)
- Josephat Obi Oguejiofor (living, Nigeria, nf)
- Olu Oguibe (born 1964, Nigeria/US, nf)
- Ike Oguine (living, Nigeria, f)
- Molara Ogundipe (1940–2019, Nigeria, p/nf)
- Wole Oguntokun (born 1967, Nigeria, d/nf)
- Mushitaro Oguri (小栗虫太郎, 1901–1946, Japan, f)
- Frank O'Hara (1926–1966, US, p/d)
- John O'Hara (1905–1970, US, f/d/nf)
- John Bernard O'Hara (1862–1927, Australia, p)
- Pixie O'Harris (1903–1991, Wales/Australia, nf/p/ch), pseudonym of Rhona Olive Harris
- Bruno K. Öijer (born 1951, Sweden, p)
- Tanure Ojaide (born 1948, Nigeria, p/f/nf)
- Bayo Ojikutu (born 1971, Nigeria/US, f)
- Okakura Kakuzō (岡倉覚三, 1863–1913, Japan, nf)
- Atukwei Okai (1941–2018, Gold Coast/Ghana, p/nf)
- Kanoko Okamoto (岡本かの子, 1889–1939, Japan, p/nf)
- Kido Okamoto (岡本綺堂, 1872–1939, Japan, d)
- Gabriel Okara (1921–2019, Nigeria, p/n)
- Janette Oke (born 1935, Canada, f)
- Chioma Okereke (living, Nigeria/England, p/f)
- Christopher Okigbo (1932–1967, Nigeria, p)
- Susan Moller Okin (born 1964, N Zealand, nf)
- Einar Økland (born 1940, Norway, p/d/ch)
- Julie Okoh (born 1947, Nigeria, d/f)
- Nnedi Okorafor (born 1974, Nigeria/US, f/ch)
- Okot p'Bitek (1931–1982, Uganda, p/nf)
- Ifeoma Okoye (born c. 1937, Nigeria, f/ch)
- Chinelo Okparanta (born 1981, Nigeria/US, f)
- Isidore Okpewho (1941–2016, Nigeria/US, f/nf)
- Ben Okri (born 1959, Nigeria/England, p/f)
- Mary Karooro Okurut (born 1954, Uganda, f/nf)

== Ol–Oo ==
- Afolabi Olabimtan (1932–2003, Nigeria, f/nf)
- Olatubosun Oladapo (born 1943, Nigeria, p/d/nf)
- Auður Ava Ólafsdóttir (born 1958, Iceland, f/d/p)
- Eggert Ólafsson (1726–1768, Iceland, nf)
- Jón Ólafsson (1850–1916, Iceland/Canada, nf)
- Jón Ólafsson (c. 1594–1679, Iceland, nf)
- Ólafur Jóhann Ólafsson (born 1962, Iceland, nf)
- Páll Ólafsson (1927–2005, Iceland, p)
- Nicolaus Olahus (1493–1568, Hungary, nf)
- John Olday (1905–1977, US/Australia, f)
- Jenny Oldfield (born 1949, England, ch)
- John Oldmixon (1673–1742, England, nf/p/d)
- Sharon Olds (born 1942, US, p)
- Michael O'Leary (born 1950, N Zealand, p/f)
- Sibylle von Olfers (1881–1916, Germany, ch)
- Sergio Olguín (born 1967, Argentina, f/nf/ch)
- Laurence Oliphant (1829–1888, S Africa/England, nf/f)
- Margaret Oliphant (1828–1897, Scotland/England, f/nf)
- Ukamaka Olisakwe (born 1982, Nigeria, f/d)
- Oscar Núñez Oliva (born 1955, Costa Rica, f)
- Gabriela Torres Olivares (born 1982, Mexico, f/nf)
- Gloria Olive (1923–2006, US/N Zealand, nf)
- Jamie Oliver (born 1975, England, nf)
- Marina Oliver (born 1934, England, f/nf)
- Mary Oliver (1935–2019, US, p)
- Narelle Oliver (1960–2016, Australia, ch)
- Alberto de Oliveira (1857–1937, Brazil, p)
- Carlos de Oliveira (1921–1981, Portugal, p/f)
- Juste Olivier (1807–1876, Switzerland, p/f/nf)
- Narcís Oller (1846–1930, Spain, f)
- Alfred Ollivant (1874–1927, England, f), Owd Bob
- Ayodele Olofintuade (born 1970s, Nigeria, ch/f/nf)
- Simbo Olorunfemi (living, Nigeria, p/nf)
- Gregg Olsen (born 1959, US, nf/f)
- Charles Olson (1910–1970, US, p)
- Albert Olsson (1904–1994, Sweden, f)
- Jan Olof Olsson (1920–1974, Sweden, nf)
- Linda Olsson (born 1948, Sweden/N Zealand, f)
- Grozdana Olujić (1934–2019, Yugoslavia/Serbia, f/ch)
- Daniel O'Mahony (born 1973, England, f/d)
- Rageh Omaar (born 1967, Somalia/England, nf)
- Carola Oman (1897–1978, England, f/nf/ch)
- Qais Akbar Omar (born 1982, Afghanistan/US, nf)
- Shazia Omar (living, Bangladesh, f/nf)
- Kristín Ómarsdóttir (born 1962, Iceland, f/p/d)
- Rahraw Omarzad (born 1964, Afghanistan, nf)
- Ömer Seyfettin (1884–1920, Ottoman E, f/p)
- Tamsin Omond (born 1984, England, nf)
- Kole Omotoso (1943–2023, Nigeria, f/nf)
- Arthur Omre (1887–1967, Norway, f)
- Kola Onadipe (1922–1988, Nigeria, ch)
- Iván Oñate (born 1948, Ecuador, p/f)
- Michael Ondaatje (born 1943, Ceylon/Canada, p/f/nf)
- Ondjaki (born 1977, Angola, p/ch/f), pseudonym of Ndalu de Almeida
- Ľudo Ondrejov (1901–1962, Austria-Hungary/Czechoslovakia, p/f/nf)
- Alexandre O'Neill (1924–1986, Portugal, p)
- Eugene O'Neill (1888–1953, US, d/f)
- Tony O'Neill (born 1978, England/US, f/p/nf)
- Juan Carlos Onetti (1909–1994, Uruguay/Spain, f)
- Beria Onger (1921–2015, Turkey, nf)
- Oliver Onions (1873–1961, England, f)
- Makena Onjerika (born 1980s, Kenya, f)
- Tõnu Õnnepalu (born 1962, Estonia, f/nf/p)
- Fuyumi Ono (小野不由美, born 1960, Japan, f)
- Ono no Komachi (小野小町, c. 825 – c. 900, Japan, p)
- Saishū Onoe (尾上柴舟, 1876–1957, Japan, p), pseudonym of Hachirō Onoe (尾上八郎)
- Nuzo Onoh (born 1962, Nigeria, f/nf)
- Onomacritus (c. 530–480 BCE, Greece, p)
- Charles van Onselen (born 1944, S Africa, nf)
- Inte Onsman (1872–1929, Netherlands, d)
- Chibundu Onuzo (born 1991, Nigeria, f)
- Nduka Onwuegbute (born 1969, England/Nigeria, d/f/ch)
- Osonye Tess Onwueme (born 1955, Nigeria, d/p/nf)
- Troy Onyango (born 1993, Kenya, nf/f)
- Charles Onyango-Obbo (born 1958, Uganda, nf)
- Ifeoma Onyefulu (born 1959, Nigeria/England, ch/f)
- Onyeka (living, England, nf)
- Makoto Ōoka (大岡信, 1931–2017, Japan, p/nf)
- Shōhei Ōoka (大岡昇平, 1909–1988, Japan, f/nf)
- T. K. Oommen (1937–2026, India, nf)

== Op–Oz ==
- Joanna Oparek (born 1967, Poland, f/p)
- Joseph Opatoshu (1886–1954, Poland/US, f)
- Amelia Opie (1769–1853, England, f/p/nf)
- Martin Opitz (1597–1639, Germany/Danzig, p)
- Kenneth Oppel (born 1967, Canada, ch)
- George Oppen (1908–1984, US, p)
- E. Phillips Oppenheim (1866–1946, England/Guernsey, f)
- Joachim Oppenheim (1832–1891, Austria/Czech, nf)
- Andrés Oppenheimer (born 1951, Argentina, nf)
- Robert Oppenheimer (1904–1967, US, nf)
- Artur Oppman (1867–1931, Russian E/Poland, p)
- Leonard Oprea (born 1953, Romania/US, f/p/nf)
- Marek Oramus (born 1952, Poland, f/nf)
- Claudia Orange (born 1938, N Zealand, nf)
- Vladimir Oravsky (born 1947, Czechoslovakia/Sweden, d/ch)
- Yolanda Oreamuno (1916–1956, Costa Rica, f/nf)
- Alexander Orbeliani (1802–1869, Russian E, p/d/nf)
- David Orbeliani (1739–1796, Georgia, p)
- Grigol Orbeliani (1804–1883, Russian E, p)
- Sulkhan-Saba Orbeliani (1658–1725, Georgia, nf)
- Vakhtang Orbeliani (1812–1890, Russian E, p)
- Margaret Orbell (1935–2006, N Zealand, nf)
- Mavro Orbini (1563–1614, Ragusa, nf)
- Baroness Orczy (1865–1947, Hungary/England, f/d)
- Edward Otho Cresap Ord, II (1858–1923, US, p)
- Orderic Vitalis (1075 – c. 1142, England, nf)
- Jerry Ordway (born 1957, US, f/ch)
- Bill O'Reilly (born 1949, US, nf)
- Dowell O'Reilly (1865–1923, Australia, p/f)
- Giorgio Orelli (1921–2013, Switzerland, p/nf)
- Giovanni Orelli (1928–2016, Switzerland, p/f/nf)
- Zaharije Orfelin (1726–1785, Habsburg E, nf/p)
- Mathieu Orfila (1787–1853, Spain/France, nf)
- Emilio Oribe (1893–1975, Uruguay, p/nf)
- Origen (c. 184 – c. 253 CE, Egypt/Lebanon, nf)
- Nadia Origo (born 1977, Gabon/France, f/nf)
- Shinobu Orikuchi (折口信夫, 1887–1953, Japan, nf/f/p)
- Bukola Oriola (born 1976, Nigeria/US, nf)
- Tore Ørjasæter (1886–1968, Norway, nf/p)
- Iza Orjonikidze (1938–2010, USSR/Georgia, p/nf)
- Władysław Orkan (1875–1930, Austria-Hungary/Poland, f/nf/p)
- István Örkény (1912–1979, Hungary, d/f)
- Uri Orlev (1931–2022, Poland/Israel, ch)
- Milan Orlić (born 1962, Yugoslavia/Serbia, p/nf)
- Peter Orlovsky (1933–2010, US, p)
- Kate Orman (born 1968, Australia, f)
- Edward Ormondroyd (1925–2025, US, ch)
- Olga Orozco (1920–1999, Algeria, p)
- Elvira Orphée (1922–2018, Argentina, f)
- Gregory Orr (born 1947, US, p)
- Mary Orr (1910–2006, US, f)
- Sue Orr (born 1962, N Zealand, f)
- Julie Orringer (born 1973, US, f)
- Hanne Ørstavik (born 1969, Norway, f)
- Garcia de Orta (c. 1501–1568, Portugal, nf)
- José Ortega y Gasset (1883–1955, Spain, nf)
- Abraham Ortelius (1527–1598, Netherlands, nf)
- Ramalho Ortigão (1836–1916, Portugal, nf)
- Adalberto Ortiz (1914–2003, Ecuador, f/p)
- Alicia Dujovne Ortiz (born 1940, Argentina, nf)
- Juan Laurentino Ortiz (1896–1978, Argentina, p)
- Ernst Ortlepp (1800–1864, Germany, p)
- Joe Orton (1933–1967, England, d/f/nf)
- Julia Anna Orum (1843–1904, US, nf)
- Ernst Orvil (1898–1985, Norway, f/p/d), pseudonym of Ernst Richard Nilsen
- George Orwell (1903–1950, England/Scotland, f/nf), pseudonym of Eric Arthur Blair
- Eliza Orzeszkowa (1841–1910, Russian E, f/nf)
- Dennis Osadebay (1911–1994, Nigeria, p/nf)
- Kaoru Osanai (小山内薫, 1881–1928, Japan, d)
- Arthur Osborne (1906–1970, UK, nf)
- Helen Osborne (1939–2004, England, nf)
- John Osborne (1929–1994, England, d)
- Mary Pope Osborne (born 1949, US, ch)
- Paul Oscar (born 1970, Iceland, p), pseudonym of Páll Óskar Hjálmtýsson
- Lee Oser (born 1958, US, f/nf)
- Alice Oseman (born 1996, England, f/ch/d)
- Tam O'Shaughnessy (born 1952, US, ch)
- Pat O'Shea (1931–2007, Ireland/England, ch)
- Shunrō Oshikawa (押川春浪, 1876–1914, Japan, f/nf)
- Andreas Osiander (1498–1552, Germany, nf)
- Agnieszka Osiecka (1936–1997, Poland, p/d)
- Sara Margrethe Oskal (born 1970, Norway, p/f/d)
- Jón Óskar (1921–1998, Iceland, p)
- Sam Osman (living, England/US, f/ch)
- Shawkat Osman (1917–1998, India/Bangladesh, f)
- Mari Osmundsen (born 1951, Norway, f/ch), pseudonym of Anne Kristine Halling
- Femi Osofisan (born 1946, Nigeria, d/nf)
- E. C. Osondu (living, Nigeria, f/nf)
- Ana de Castro Osório (1872–1935, Portugal, nf)
- Ferdynand Antoni Ossendowski (1876–1945, Russian E/Poland, nf)
- Carl von Ossietzky (1889–1938, Germany, nf)
- Hanni Ossott (1946–2002, Venezuela, p/nf)
- Klas Östergren (born 1955, Sweden, f/d)
- Josip Osti (1945–2021, Yugoslavia/Slovenia, p/nf)
- Ljubica Ostojić (1945–2021), Yugoslavia/Bosnia, p/nf/d)
- John Ostrander (born 1949, US, ch)
- Niyi Osundare (born 1947, Nigeria, p/d/nf)
- Sissel Benneche Osvold (born 1945, Norway, nf)
- Oswald von Wolkenstein (1336/1337–1445, Germany, p)
- Alice Oswald (born 1966, England, p)
- Mizuho Ōta (太田水穂, 1876–1955, Japan, p/nf), pseudonym of Teiichi Ōta (太田貞)
- Manuel Ramos Otero (1948–1990, Puerto Rico, nf/p)
- Otfrid of Weissenburg (c. 800–870, Germany, p)
- Ōtomo no Yakamochi (大伴家持, c. 718–785, Japan, p)
- U Ottama (1879–1939, Burma, nf)
- Óttarr svarti (fl: 11th c., Iceland, p)
- Géza Ottlik (1912–1990, Hungary, nf)
- Moncef Ouahibi (born 1949, Tunisia, p/f/nf)
- Fernand Ouellette (1930–2026, Canada, p/f/nf)
- Tahar Ouettar (1936–2010, Algeria, f/nf), also known as Al-Tāhir Wattar
- Malika Oufkir (born 1953, Morocco/France, nf)
- Onyinye Ough (living, Nigeria, f/nf)
- Julya Oui (living, Malaysia, p/f)
- Ouida (1839–1908, England/Italy, f/ch/nf), pseudonym of Maria Louise Ramé
- Touria Oulehri (born 1962, Morocco, nf)
- Yambo Ouologuem (1940–2017, Mali, f/nf)
- Ide Oumarou (1937–2002, Niger, nf)
- Sarah Outen (born 1985, England, nf)
- Ouyang Xiu (歐陽脩, 1007–1072, China, nf/p)
- Ouyang Xun (歐陽詢, 557–641, China, f)
- Ouyang Yu (歐陽昱, born 1945, China/Australia, p/f/nf)
- Helen Ovbiagele (born 1944, Nigeria, f)
- Keith Ovenden (1943–2023, England, f/nf)
- Caroline Overington (born 1970, Australia, f/nf)
- Thomas Overbury (1581–1613, England, p/nf)
- Arnulf Øverland (1889–1968, Norway, p)
- Charles Overton (1805–1889, England, nf/p)
- Ovid (43 BCE – 17/18 CE, Roman E, p), full name Publius Ovidius Naso
- Owain Owain (1929–1993, Wales, f/p)
- Robin Llwyd ab Owain (born 1959, Wales, p)
- Daniel Owen (1836–1895, Wales, f)
- David Owen (1795–1866, Wales, nf), pseudonym Brutus
- David Owen (Dewi Wyn o Eifion) (1784–1841, Wales, p)
- Gerallt Lloyd Owen (1944–2014, Wales, p)
- Goronwy Owen (1723–1769, Wales/US, p)
- Jan Owen (born 1940, Australia, p)
- Robert Owen (1771–1858, Wales/England, nf)
- Ruth Owen (1885–1954, US, nf/ch)
- Wilfred Owen (1893–1918, England/France, p)
- William David Owen (1874–1925, Wales, f)
- Yvonne Adhiambo Owuor (born 1968, Kenya, f/nf)
- Helen Oxenbury (born 1938, England, ch)
- Elsie J. Oxenham (1880–1960, England, ch)
- Johan Gabriel Oxenstierna (1750–1818, Sweden, p)
- Gunnhild Øyehaug (born 1975, Norway, p/f/nf)
- Oyèrónkẹ́ Oyěwùmí (born 1957, Nigeria, nf)
- Helen Oyeyemi (born 1984, Nigeria/Czech R, f/d)
- Lauren Oyler (living, US, f)
- Ferdinand Oyono (1929–2010, Cameroon, f)
- Leticia de Oyuela (1935–2008, Honduras, nf)
- Amos Oz (1939–2018, Palestine/Israel, f/ch/nf)
- Ozaki Hōsai (尾崎放哉, 1885–1926, Japan, p)
- Ozaki Kihachi (尾崎喜八, 1892–1974, Japan, p)
- Ozaki Kōyō (尾崎紅葉, 1868–1903, Japan, f/p)
- Jacques Ozanam (1640–1718, France, nf)
- Emine Sevgi Özdamar (born 1946, Turkey/Germany, f/nf)
- Ismet Özel (born 1944, Turkey, p/nf)
- Joshua Ozersky (1967–2015, US, nf)
- Cynthia Ozick (born 1928, US, f/nf)
- Hanna Ożogowska (1904–1995, Duchy of Warsaw/Poland, f/p)
- Yasujirō Ozu (小津安二郎, 1903–1963, Japan, d)
