= List of Macedonian women writers =

This is a list of women writers who were born in North Macedonia or whose writings are closely associated with that country.

== B ==
- Rumena Bužarovska (born 1981), writer

== D ==
- Lidija Dimkovska (born 1971), poet

== M ==
- Slavka Maneva (February 2, 1934 – January 8, 2010), writer and poet

== S ==
- Ana Stojanoska (born 22 November 1977), theatre researcher and writer

== See also ==
- List of women writers
- List of Macedonian writers
