= List of Somali writers =

The following is a list of Somali writers.

- Abdillahi Diiriye Guled
- Maxamed Daahir Afrax
- Shire Jama Ahmed
- Ahmed Farah Ali 'Idaja'
- Nuruddin Farah
- Saida Hagi-Dirie Herzi
- Faarax Maxamed Jaamac Cawl
- Afdhere Jama
- Abdi Kusow
- Zam Zam Abdullahi Abdi
- Abdi Sheik Abdi
- Dada Masiti
- Nadifa Mohamed
- Hassan Sheikh Mumin
- Said Sheikh Samatar
- Abdourahman Waberi
- Warsan Shire
- Ayaan Hirsi Ali
