= List of Pashto-language writers =

Prose writers and poets who work in the Pashto language include:

List of Pashto-language writers may refer to:

- Rahman Baba (1653–1711)
- Khan Abdul Ghani Khan (1914–1996)
- Khushal Khattak (1613–1689)
- Hamza Shinwari (1907–1994)
