= Theodor Illek =

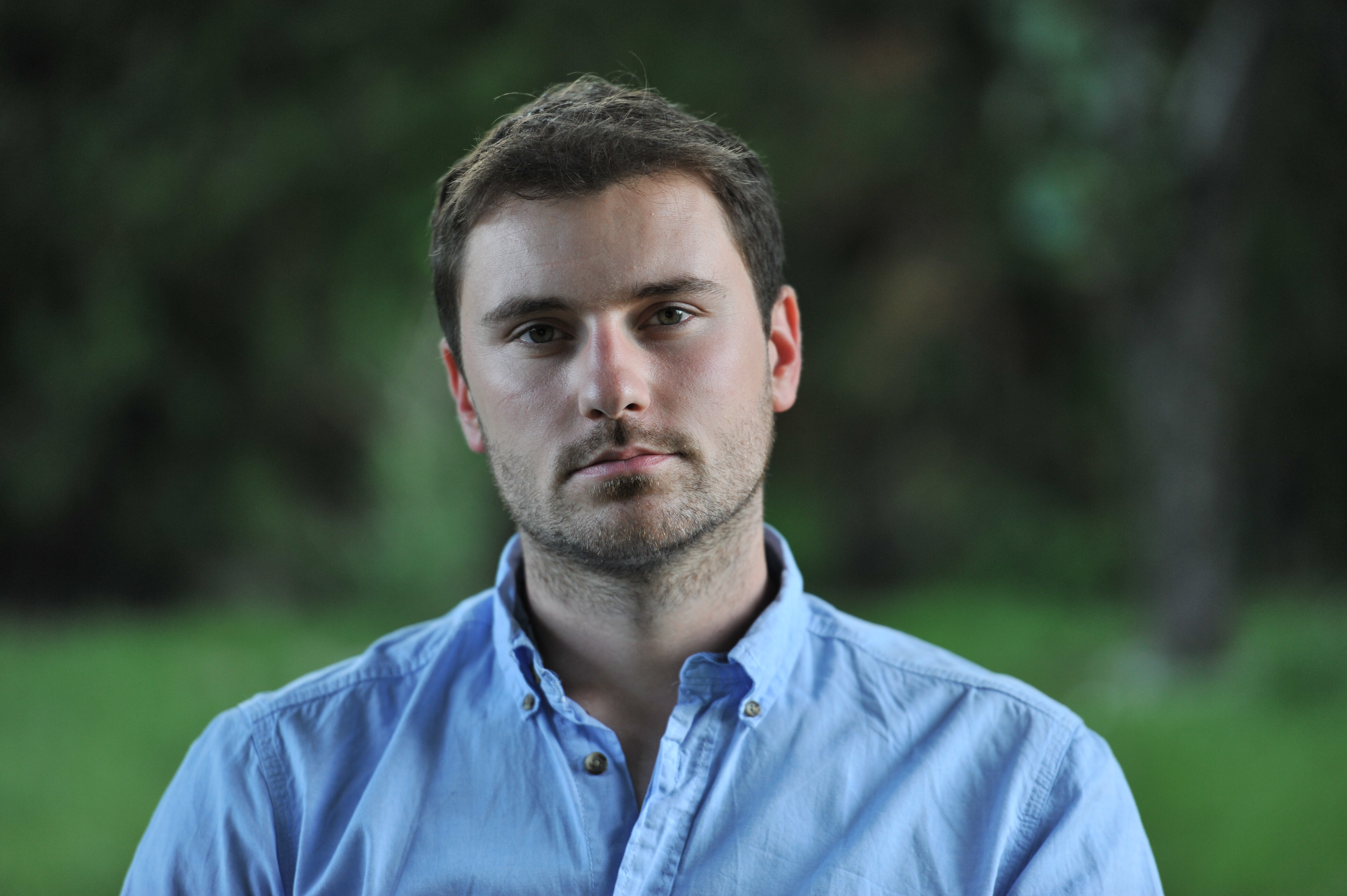

Theodor Illek (born in 1984, Kranj, Slovenia), is a poet, prose writer, visual artist, and playwright who focuses on the themes of migration, religion, and the issue of connecting art with science. He is a doctor in veterinarian medicine by training. Since 2007, he has been presenting his work both in Slovenia and abroad, namely in Russia, France, Germany, Israel, Austria, the Czech Republic, Bosnia and Herzegovina, Serbia, as the author of independent and group experimental projects implemented in the framework of a contemporary art society called Aggressive Theatre. He is also a co-founder of the same society and its president. Illek's poetry is published in the notable Slovenian (Nova revija, Sodobnost, Literatura, Dialogi, Poetikon, Lirikon, Mentor, etc.) and foreign magazines (Le Rouge sang, Rukopisi 32 (Belgrade, Serbia), Van kutije – an anthology of modern poetry (Podgorica; Montenegro), Republika poezije (Sarajevo, Bosnia and Herzegovina), Euroorientacije (Sarajevo, Bosnia and Herzegovina), DeZopilant (France)). His first work of poetry, called Sinapse, for which he received a scholarship from a fund for gifted high-school and university students, was published in 2003.

Illek lives and works in Vienna.

== Education ==
- 2011 Veterinary Faculty Ljubljana (Doctor of Veterinary Medicine)
- 2003 Gimnazija Bežigrad, Ljubljana

== Solo exhibitions ==
- 2011 Where is God?, Galery Tir, Nova Gorica
- 2010 Moustrap II, IRIU Institut, Ljubljana
- 2010 Mobile Mosque, Gallery Studio8, Ljubljana
- 2009 Acute Art, Mala Gallery, Ljubljana
- 2009 Südbahnhof Poesie, Railway station, Vienna
- 2008 Desperance, Concentration camp, Goli Otok
- 2008 For Whom the Phone Rings? International art festival Ana desetnica, Ljubljana
- 2007 A Poet in Paris, Cankarjev Dom, Ljubljana
- 2007 Equivalentis, Modern Gallery, Ljubljana

== Group projects ==
- 2009 The birth of poetry, European Slam poetry festival, Berlin
- 2009 Stone on Stone, Concentration camp, Goli Otok
- 2008 Gen 80 Kolovrat Theatre, Ljubljana
- 2008 How to destroy a gallery, Son:Da, Maribor
- 2007 Najin princ, David Luzar's film, Kamnik
- 2005 Jutro 1, Memorial park, Ljubljana

== Theatre ==
- 2003 Non Si Paga! Non Si Paga!, Teater na robu, Ljubljana,
- 2004 Premik, Dance Theatre Ljubljana, Ljubljana
- 2008 Seventeen moments of spring, International art festival Ana desetnica, Ljubljana

== Bibliography ==
- 2010 The Poetry of an Experiment, Aggressive Theatre
- 2003 Sinapse, poetry collection, Gimnazija bezigrad

== Translations ==
- 2009 Kruhovec (Breadfruit), Malika Booker, Mouthmark, 2007

== Publications ==
- 2012 Conceit Magazine, San Francisco CA
- 2012 Amulet, San Francisco CA
- 2011 DeZopilant, Reims France
- 2010 AmphibiUs, Washington DC
- 2010 Sodobnost, Ljubljana
- 2010 Van Kutije Anthology, Podgorica
- 2010 Le Rouge sang, Reims
- 2010 Katedra, Ljubljana
- 2009 Literatura, Ljubljana
- 2009 Mlade rime, Ljubljana
- 2009 Lirikon, Velenika
- 2009 Rukopisi 32, Beograd
- 2009 Literarni nokturno, RTV Slo
- 2009 Republika poezije, Sarajevo
- 2009 Dialogi, Zalozba Obzorja
- 2008 Nova Revija, Ljubljana
- 2008 Vpogled, Zalec
- 2008 Mentor, Ljubljana
- 2008 Ructus, Ljubljana
- 2007 Poetikon, Ljubljana
- 2007 Literarni nokturno, RTV Slo
- 2003 Lit, Gimnazija Bezigrad

== Grants and awards ==
- 2010 First prize for poetry on international poetry competition "Sledi - Tracce" Trieste, Italy
- 2010 First prize for the collection of poetry NY on Ekslibris publishing house competition
- 2009 Nomination for Herberstein / Lirikon gold for best contemporary translation of poetry into Slovenian (Breadfruit)
- 2008 Chosen between 21 best Slovenian poets by poetry magazine Lirikon
- 2004 Stipendium for poetry collection Sinapse from found for talented students of municipality Domžale

== Sources ==
- tir.mostovna.com
- agrressive-theatre.com
- celesteprize.com
- sl:Theodor Illek
