= Paulina Pukytė =

Lithuanian artist, poet, essayist and critic

Paulina Pukyté (born 1966) is a Lithuanian artist, poet, essayist and critic. She studied at the Vilnius Academy of Art and the Royal College of Art in London, where she was a winner of the Madame Tussaud's Art Prize. She has taught at the Vilnius Academy of Art and the Kaunas Art Institute.

As a writer, she has published three books: Jų papročiai (Their Habits, 2005), Netikras Zuikis (Fake Rabbit, 2008) and Bedalis ir labdarys (A Loser and a Do-gooder, 2013). Netikras Zuikis was shortlisted for the Book Of The Year award in Lithuania. Pukyté also writes regularly on cultural issues in the Lithuanian press.

She divides her time between London and Vilnius.
