= Ana Stojanoska =

Macedonian academic (born 1977)

Dr. Ana Stojanoska
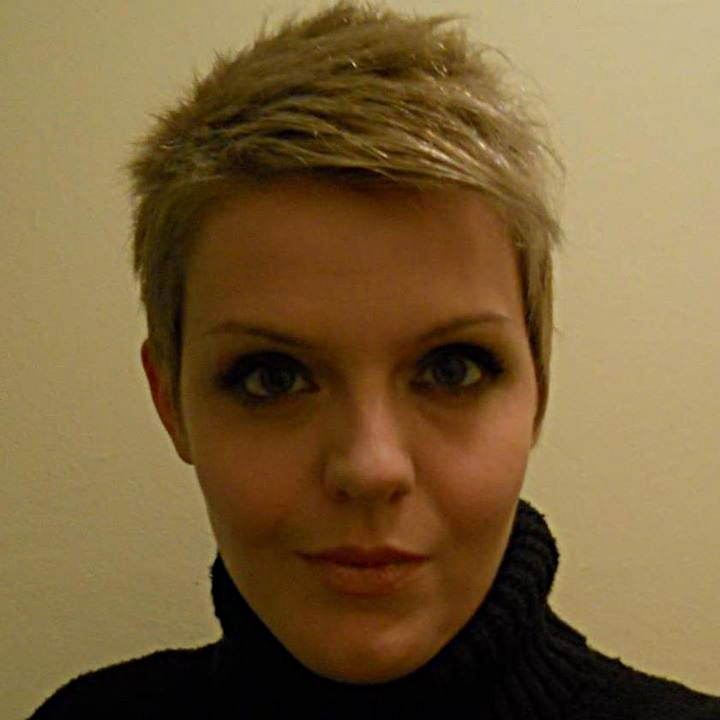
- Born: 22 November 1977 (age 48); Prilep, SR Macedonia, SFR Yugoslavia

Ana Stojanoska, born 22 November 1977 in Prilep, SR Macedonia is a theatre researcher and writer.

== Education ==
She graduated from the Blaže Koneski Faculty of Philology at Ss. Cyril and Methodius University of Skopje in 2001, earned her MA in 2003 and PhD in 2007 in theatrology on the Faculty of Dramatic Arts.

In March 2002 Stojanoska began work as a freelance associate researcher at the Institute of Theatrology at the University of Skopje, before becoming a coordinator – researcher at the same institute. In September 2003 she went for a study stay/specialist activity at the Museum of Dramatic Arts in Belgrade.

== Professional career ==
In April 2004 she was elected as a junior assistant for the subject of Macedonian drama and theater at the Faculty of Dramatic Arts at the University of Skopje, and she was reelected for the same subject in February 2007. From April 2010 she was elected as assistant professor for the same subject, and in 2011 for the subject of comparative literature as well. Since the academic year of 2012/2013 she has been teaching History of world drama and theater. These subjects are being taught to students from all study groups in the faculty. She is engaged with her subjects in MA studies, and the accreditation for the PhD studies at the Faculty is in procedure, where she has three subjects (for licensing/accreditation as mentor for the same studies as well). Stojanoska is a member of the Association for comparative literature of Macedonia and member of the program committee of Macedonian ITI-UNESCO. She used to write reviews for theatre plays in the daily newspaper Dnevnik Editor of the book Drami by Dejan Dukovski, Skopje: ProArts (2002).

She's one of the authors of Glossary of Literary Theory, Skopje, MANU (2007).

Organisers of parts of Fakti and one of the co-author of monographs Ilija Milchin, (edited by Jelena Luzina), (2003); Vojdan Chernodrinski MTF and Petre Prlichko (edited by Jelena Luzina), (2004), Skopje: Magor.

Author of the monodrama Glass Lampion first performed by "Theatra" 16 June 2013.

Initiator, coordinator and one of the main editors of the journal "Ars Academica"-( in a process of preparation) scientific journal with an international editorial board, which will be prepared and published in collaboration between Faculty of dramatic arts – Skopje and Faculty of music arts – Skopje.

Author of the book Macedonian postmodern theater, Skopje: FDA (2006).

Stojanoska has participated in the work of several scientific symposia and workshops in the field of theater science. Idea, concept and realization of the jubilee "Sixty years of the death of Vojdan Chernodrinski" at MTF. Vojdan Chernodrinski, led several scientific debates and promotions at the same festival, hosted an international workshop dedicated to August Strindberg, at the FDA-Skopje festival in Skomrahi in 2012, and hosted a debate at the Free zone festival in Vinica in 2013.

== List of published works ==
- The birth of the character of the text-play relationship (with examples from the play "Closer" – Patrick Marber), directed by Slobodan Unkovski, (Published on the third program of Radio Skopje- 13 April 2001.)
- Women's letter in the novel "Steffie Speck in jaws of life" by Dubravka Ugreshich. (Published on the third program of Radio Skopje- 20 April 2001).
- Words as a means to display an existential crisis (Quiet and slow read of the novel "Snow man" by David Albahari).(Published in "Stremez", September 2001., P. 148-152).
- Skills that transforms into art – Code of Macedonian tradition as a quote in the dramaturgy of Dejan Dukovski. by Dukovski, 2002, Skopje: ProArts, page 3-16)
- The beginnings of (proto) history of a man (Published in the monograph Ilija Milchin (edited by Jelena Luzina), 2003, Prilep: MTF “Vojdan Chernodrinski", page 145-151).
- Macedonian postmodern theater (Published in "Theatre on Macedonian soil from antiquity to present", (vol.1), MANU, 2004, page 215-234)
- Interculturalism and theater (Published on mactheatre.edu.mk, 2004).
- Chekhov- Stanislavski- Kjostarov- "The Seagull" 1960 (Read at the symposium: Chehov and us, MTF, "Vojdan Chernodrinski" - Prilep, 5 June 2004г ).
- Traveling as a motive or reason for a different dramaturgy (First read at the scientific conference seminar on Macedonian language, literature and culture, Ohrid, 17 August 2004).
- Petre Prlichko and the audience(Published in monograph Petre Prlichko (edited by Jelena Luzina), (2004), Skopje, Magor, page 165-180).
- The repertoire of the theater in Shtip (1923–1936): premieres (First read at the symposium "80 years organized theatrical activity-Shtip 2004", Shtip, 5 November 2004)
- A pictorial symbolism of ancient (for the movie: The art of prayer) (Published by "Kinopis", issue number:31-32, 2005, page 79-84).
- Traveling as a motive or reason for a different dramaturgy (Published by "Nashe Pismo", 2005, page 43-46)
- Intracultural theater dispersion (First read at the Scientific Conference Intercultural Theatre, "Scomrahi", FDA-Skopje, 30 March 2005).
- Milica Stojanova: Veils, faces (Reviews for a monograph) (Published in "Cultural Life", issue number 3/2005, page 108-109).
- In pursuit for the heritage: Ad Majorem Dei Gloriam (Theatre History and the Society of Jesuits (Published by mactheatre.edu.mk, 2005)
- Intracultural Theatrical Dispersion or on Recent Macedonian Theatrical Matters (Published in "Intercultural Theatre" 2005, Skopje, FDA-Skopje, page 149-165).
- Infinity as a challenge (the theatricality of the dervish rituals in the plays of Vladimir Milchin) (Published in "Cultural Life", issue3/2005, page 92-99).
- Interculturalism and theater (Published in "Exploring the otherness: aspects of otherness at perspective of individual disciplines in the high education in Macedonia", edited by Slobodanka Markovska, Vladimir Davchev and Dona Kolar-Panova (2005), Skopje, FIOOM, page 351-356).
- Parallels… the Woman- victim or a hero?!? - with examples from the works of Goran Stefanovski and Eugene O'Neill (Read at а scientific conference at the seminar on Macedonian language, literature and culture, Ohrid, 17 August 2005).
- Traveling as a motive or reason for a different dramaturgy (Published in the "Proceedings 31 Seminar for Macedonian language, literature and culture, Skopje", 2005).
- The Woman- victim, hero and/ or executioner?!? (Intimate reading of female characters from the works of Goran Stefanovski and Eugene O'Neill, published in “Nashe Pismo”, 2005)
- Intercultural theater dispersion or for the recent Macedonian theater works
- Intercultural theater dispersion or for the recent Macedonian theater works ("Blesok" issue 45, November/December 2005)
- Traveling as a motive or reason for a different dramaturgy (Serbian translation) ("Gradina" issue 12, 2006)
- Fear of identifying or The current (Postmodern) crisis of identity and its implications in the Macedonian theater (Scientific conference "Theatre and Identity", Skopje, 29 March 2006)
- Intimate reading of "Crnila" by Kole Chashule ("Sintezi" issue number 4/2006, page 21-23)
- The new face of theatre musicology- the Past in the Future (Published by "Blesok", issue number 57)
- Theatre... Various (Published in "Portal", issue number 21/22, 2007)
- Performative potential of "Metamorphoses" by Ovidius Naso- Theatrical performance as metatext (Scientific workshop "Metamorphoses-Meta-texts", Skopje, 11 May 2007)
- The theatre in search for its identity crisis or the identity of the Macedonian theatrical way (Read at the debate Macedonian theatrical identity, MOT, 26 September 2007)
- The new face of theatre musicology- The past in the future ("Blesok" issue number 57, November/December 2007)
- Ilija Djuvalekovski- from a female point of view (Published in "Mirage" 18 November 2007)
- Multiple articles in The theatre on Macedonian soil in XX century (Book 15) Skopje, MANU
- Through the curves of Balkans theatre remembrance- theatrical reading of the traveling theaters phenomenon ("Macedonian theater: Balkan context" edited by Jelena Luzina FDA-Skopje, 2007 page 271-290)
- Theatres in the service of ideology- Partisan theaters between engagement and the art ("Macedonian theater: Balkan context" edited by Jelena Luzina FDA-Skopje, 2007 page 291-304)
- The new face of theatre museology or The Past in the Future ("Theatre and memory", edited by Jelena Luzina, Skopje, 2008, FDA, page 225-335.)
- Performative potential of "Metamorphoses" by Ovidius Naso- Theatrical performance as metatext (metamorphoses and metatexts- collection of papers, Skopje, 2008, Association of classical philologists "Antika”, and Association of comparative literature of Macedonia, page 159-169).
- Always returning home- Space Odysseys (through examples of some of the most remarkable works of science fiction) (Scientific workshop “ODYSSEYS”, Faculty of Philology, Skopje, 1 June 2009, published in "Odysseys for odyssey" (collection of works), Skopje, 2010, Association of classical philologists "Antika", and Association of comparative literature of Macedonia, page 141-154)
- One theater contemplation- Ibzen as a challenge (Seminar introducing Norwegian literature within a wider Scandinavian context, Skopje, 25–26 November 2010)
- Revealing the Balkan genome of creation (instead of destruction)- Theatre tattoos (Essay contest for "Diversity", the new image of Balkans, 02.2011)
- Croatian dramatists in the translation of Ilija Milchin (Croatian Macedonian literary and cultural links, Rijeka, 22–25 March 2011)
- Macedonian! Peoples. Theatre?- Etymology of a potential ontology(MNT, debate, 4 April 2011)
- Writing a movie- comparative analysis of the poetics of Paul Auster and his "movie" literature (30 years general and comparative literature 28–29 April 2011).
- Quest for Prilep- imaginary lead character of the tales from the collection "Chunkim velenja", by Kole Chashule ("Spektar", Skopje, 05.2011)
- Writing a movie- comparative analysis of the poetics of Paul Auster and his "movie" literature (30 years general and comparative literature, 28–29 April 2011)
- Inspiration Delchev- character of Goce Delchev in Macedonian drama (Institute of Macedonian Literature, 11.2011)
- School theater according to Djinot- performative potential of the mini dramas by Jordan Hdji Konstantinov Djinot (Veles- gathering in honor of 190 years since birth of Djinot, Veles, 2 December 2011)
- French drama authors and Macedonian theatre- influence, specifications (International symposium French language, literature and culture in Francophone context, Skopje, 12 December 2011)
- Macedonian theater during the years of the Great War (Museum of the National liberation struggle, Maribor, 2012)
- Picking through the archives of Kiril Ristoski(Monograph, MNT, 2013)
- From existentialism to absurd- reading a part of the dramatics of Chashule (Monograph, Kole Chasule, MANU,2013)
- Digitized memories (Performing art documentaries, Bristol, UK, April 2013)
- Rebel, rebel- theater music as a protest (Symposium, "Music and protest from all four corners of the world", Ljubljana, August 2013)
- Debar Maalo- portrait of Skopje in the works of Goran Stefanovski (Anthology, "Feniks", 2012)
- Virtual library of Macedonia
