= Simpson Charles Younger =

American baseball player, soldier, civil rights campaigner, and poet

Simpson Charles Younger (May 17, 1850 – May 14, 1943) was a baseball player, a soldier in the Union Army during the American Civil War, Civil Rights campaigner, and poet. An African American, he was one of the youngest soldiers to serve in the Union Army and one of the last to remain living.

His father was Charles Lee Younger (grandfather of the Younger brothers of the James–Younger Gang), and his mother, Elizabeth, was one of the people his father enslaved. He died in 1854. Younger was manumitted by his father's will and, with his sister, sent to study at Oberlin.

Younger played baseball for Oberlin College and was a pitcher. He also pitched for various teams, including the Penfields, Resolutes, and the all-black professional team, the Zulus. He was interviewed about his experiences. On the Resolutes, a team "formed from the best players" from two other clubs in 1868, Younger was "the only black man on the only integrated club in the Western Reserve". He was categorized at the time as a quadroon.

Younger sued a theater for denying him and a companion access to theater seats because they were black. The case went to the Missouri Supreme Court where, in 1892, Justice Francis Marion Black with all other justices in concurrence ruled for a standard of "separate but equal" as was custom even after the passage of the Fourteenth Amendment to the U.S. Constitution.

Younger died days before his 93rd birthday and had eight surviving children at the time of his death.
