= Zam Zam Abdullahi Abdi =

Somali journalist

- Occupations: Journalist, human rights activist
- Known for: Women's rights, children's rights

Zam Zam Abdullahi Abdi is a Somali journalist and human rights activist who focuses in particular on the rights of women and children. She is a dual citizen of Somalia and Kenya.

== Activism ==
Abdi is the capacity building officer for the Coalition of Grassroots Women's Organizations and chairperson of the Somali Chapter of the African Network for the Prevention and Protection against Child Abuse and Neglect. Abdi works for easier access to education for Somali women.

== Kidnapping ==
In 2004, while in charge of information for the Association of Somali Women Journalists, Abdi was abducted and held by armed individuals from 24 October to the 25th in Mogadishu, the capital of Somalia. She believes that she was kidnapped because of her activities in defense of children.

== 2016 terrorism allegations ==
In October 2016, Zam Zam Abdullahi Abdi went on trial in Kenya's High Court. She was accused of bombing a police station in Mombasa.

The lawsuit was denounced by the organization Cage Africa as the lawyers of the four activists concerned were not allowed to present evidence to challenge the charges.
