= Teodoras Četrauskas =

Lithuanian writer and literary translator (1944–2024)

Teodoras Četrauskas (7 May 1944 – 23 December 2024) was a Lithuanian writer and literary translator. He translated more than one hundred and forty books from German into Lithuanian, including the writing of Günter Grass, Thomas Bernhard, Franz Kafka, Elias Canetti, Siegfried Lenz, Alfred Döblin and Michael Ende.

== Biography ==
Teodoras Četrauskas was born in Čiobiškis, Širvintos district municipality on 7 May 1944. He studied German language and literature at Vilnius University.

Četrauskas died on 23 December 2024, at the age of 80.

== Style ==
Teodoras Četrauskas' work has the unique quality of satirically taking on important topics and issues present in society. He did not shy away from discussing what other writers did not dare to scrutinize.
