= List of Alfred A. Knopf authors =

Alfred A. Knopf, Inc. is a New York publishing house that was founded by Alfred A. Knopf Sr. in 1915. This is a list of authors published by Alfred A. Knopf.

== A ==
- Kōbō Abe, Japanese writer
- Leonard J. Arrington, American historian

== B ==
- John Banville, Irish writer
- Carl Bernstein, American journalist
- Elizabeth Bowen, Irish writer
- Frederick Buechner, American author
- Richard Bushman, American historian
- Witter Bynner, American author

== C ==
- James M. Cain, American author and journalist
- Albert Camus, French author and journalist
- Robert Caro, American journalist and author
- Willa Cather, American writer and novelist
- Raymond Chandler, American novelist and screenwriter
- Julia Child, American chef and cookbook author
- Bill Clinton, 42nd President of the United States

Linda Collison, American author and journalist

== D ==
- Floyd Dell, novelist, poet, playwright, critic, editor
- Joan Didion, American writer

== E ==
- T. S. Eliot, English author
- Bret Easton Ellis, American novelist
- James Ellroy, novelist and writer

== F ==
- Gustave Flaubert, French writer
- Barbara Newhall Follett, American child writer

== G ==
- Martin Gardner, American writer
- Théophile Gautier, French writer
- Kahlil Gibran, Lebanese artist, poet, and writer
- Maxim Gorky, Russian writer
- Robert Graves, English poet and novelist

== H ==
- Lee H. Hamilton, politician
- Dashiell Hammett, American writer
- Joseph Hergesheimer, novelist, short-story writer
- John Hersey, American journalist, novelist and professor
- Carl Hiaasen, American author
- Langston Hughes, American writer and social activist

== I ==
- Kazuo Ishiguro, Japanese-born British writer

== K ==
- John Keegan, British military historian and writer

== L ==
- Nella Larsen, novelist and librarian
- Wyndham Lewis, English painter, writer and critic
- Jack London, American author and journalist

== M ==
- Ross Macdonald, Canadian novelist
- Thomas Mann, German novelist and 1929 Nobel Prize Laureate
- Gabriel García Márquez, Colombian writer
- Cormac McCarthy, American novelist
- H. L. Mencken, American journalist and writer
- Toni Morrison, American writer
- Haruki Murakami, Japanese author and writer
- Edward R. Murrow, American broadcast journalist

== N ==
- George Jean Nathan, American drama critic and magazine editor

== P ==
- Christopher Paolini, American writer
- Edgar Allan Poe, American writer, poet, editor, and literary critic
- Ezra Pound, American poet and critic

== R ==
- James "Scotty" Reston, American journalist
- Anne Rice, American writer
- Dorothy Richardson, writer

== S ==
- Jean-Paul Sartre, French existentialist philosopher
- William Shirer, American journalist
- Stephen M. Silverman, American journalist
- Muriel Spark, Scottish writer
- Susan Swan, Canadian author

== T ==
- Anne Tyler, American novelist

== V ==
- Andrew Vachss, American writer and lawyer
- Carl Van Vechten, American writer and photographer

== W ==
- James D. Watson, writer
- Elinor Wylie, American poet
- Lawrence Wright, American writer and journalist

== Z ==
- Émile Zola, French writer
