= Undinė Radzevičiūtė =

Lithuanian writer

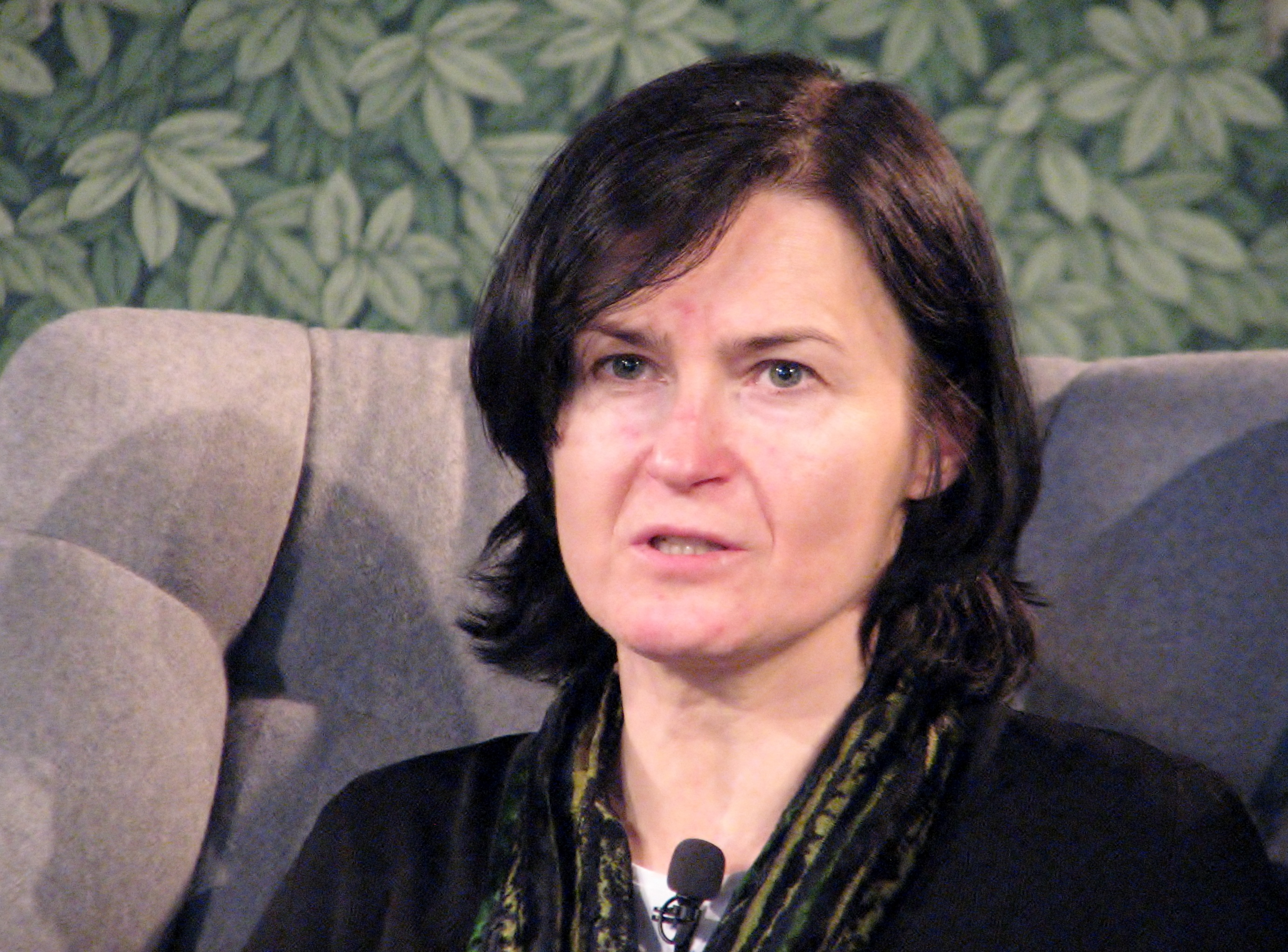
- Born: June 16, 1967 (age 59)
- Education: Vilnius Academy of Arts
- Writing career
- Language: Lithuanian
- Genre: historical fiction
- Notable works: Fish and Dragons
- Notable awards: EU Prize for Literature (2015)

Undinė Radzevičiūtė is a Lithuanian novelist, a winner of the EU Prize for Literature in 2015.

== Biography ==
She was born on 16 June 1967. Her mother's family came from Courland, a Germanic-influenced region of Latvia and has Baltic German-Polish-Lithuanian roots, while her father was Lithuanian-Polish.

Radzevičiūtė studied at the Vilnius Academy of Arts. She worked for many years in the advertising industry for Saatchi & Saatchi and Leo Burnett.

== Literary career ==
Radzevičiūtė published her first book, a novella titled Strekaza, in 2003. This was followed in 2010 by Frankburgas. Her first collection of short stories, Baden Badeno nebus was published in 2011. These tales share motivations, and the same characters appear in them. Sooner or later, an individual begins to be pressured and is forced to pretend to be simpler than they are, to adapt to the demands of society, which eventually leads to their destruction. Radzevičiūtė's writing is described as minimalist, savvy, diamond-sharp, as if cutting off unnecessary words and rejecting descriptions.

Her fourth book Fish and Dragons (2013) won the 2015 EU Prize for Literature. This was a work of historical fiction with two parallel narratives: one set in imperial China and following the Italian painter Castiglione's efforts to impress the Qing ruler, the other about three generations of women living in Vilnius' Chinatown. In both strands, she described the cultural clashes between the East and the West.

Radzevičiūtė's next work, 180, was a departure from the historical genre; this novel had a detective theme as it explored how big victories could collapse into utter defeat, and how attempts at reparation could result in death.

Her sixth book Kraujas mėlynas won the 2018 Lithuanian Writers' Union Prize.

Radzevičiūtė's work has been translated into German, Russian, Italian, Spanish, English, Hungarian, Croatian, Serbian, Bulgarian, Latvian, Estonian, Finnish.

== Selected works ==
- Strekaza. Vilnius: Tyto alba. 2003. ISBN 9789955236375.
- Frankburgas. Vilnius: Tyto alba. 2010. ISBN 9789986167525.
- Baden Badeno nebus. Vilnius: Baltos Lankos. 2011. ISBN 9789955234890.
- 180. Baltos Lankos. 2015. ISBN 9789955238119.
- Žuvys ir drakonai [Fishes and Dragons]. Baltos Lankos. 2015. ISBN 9789955236580.
- Kraujas melynas. Lietuvos rašytojų sąjungos leidykla. 2017. ISBN 9789986399308.
- Grožio ir blogio biblioteka. Lietuvos rašytojų sąjungos leidykla. 2020 ISBN 9786094801280.
