= Indrė Valantinaitė =

Lithuanian poet (born 1984)

- Born: April 5, 1984 (age 42); Kaunas, Lithuanian SSR, Soviet Union
- Education: Vilnius University; Vilnius Academy of Arts
- Occupations: Poet, singer
- Writing career
- Notable works: Of Fish and Lilies
- Notable awards: First prize, 2006 First Book Contest (poetry), Lithuanian Writers' Union

Indrė Valantinaitė (born April 5, 1984, in Kaunas, Lithuanian SSR, Soviet Union) is a Lithuanian poet.

After graduating from a Jesuit gymnasium, she studied arts management at Vilnius University and at the Vilnius Academy of Arts.

She published her poems in many periodicals, and printed her first book in 2006.

Her first book, Of Fish and Lilies earned her the first prize in the poetry category of the 2006 First Book Contest of the Lithuanian Union of Writers.

In addition to writing poems, Indrė is a singer, a winner of several singing festivals and appeared on TV.
