= Vanda Juknaitė =

Lithuanian writer and playwright

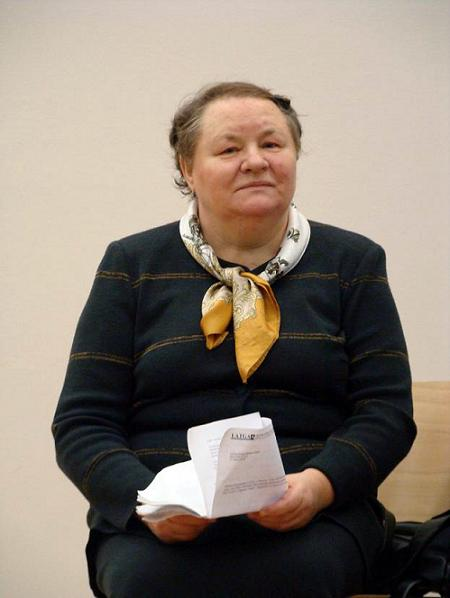
- Vanda Juknaitė
- Born: 28 November 1949 (age 76); Papiliai, Lithuania
- Education: Vilnius University
- Known for: writer, playwright

Vanda Juknaitė (born 28 November 1949) is a Lithuanian writer, playwright and essayist.

== Biography ==
Juknaitė was born in Papiliai in the Rokiškis District Municipality of northeastern Lithuania. After studying Lithuanian language and literature at Vilnius University, she taught first at the Klaipeda Conservatory and, from 1975, at the University of Educational Science. She has worked in the area of social pedagogy dealing with homeless, disabled and street children.

Her first book Ugniaspalvė lapė (The Red Fox) was published in 1983. One of her more notable works, the memoir Išsiduosi. Balsu: esė, pokalbiai, published in Lithuania in 2002 was translated into English by Laima Sruoginis as My Voice Betrays Me. It presents the joys and difficulties of Lithuania's transition from communism to democracy. Another work of note is Šermenys (1990), a novel describing the mass deportations of men to Siberia leaving the women to safeguard Lithuanian society.

In 2008, she received the Lithuanian National Prize for her achievements in art and culture and for supporting international understanding of Lithuanian culture.

== Works ==
- Ugniaspalvė lapė, novella and short stories – Vilnius: Vaga, 1983
- Šermenys, novel – Vilnius: Vaga, 1990
- Stiklo šalis, story – Vilnius: Lietuvos rašytojų sąjungos leidykla, 1995; Alma littera, 2012
- Šermenys, drama – Vilnius: Alma littera, 2000, 2001
- Išsiduosi, essays, interviews – Vilnius: Lietuvos rašytojų sąjungos leidykla, 2002
- Saulėlydžio senis: Romualdo Granausko, creative interpretations / together with Elena Nijole Bukeliene. – Vilnius: Alma littera, 2004
- Tariamas iš tamsos, interviews with children – Vilnius: Lietuvos rašytojų sąjungos leidykla, 2007, 2012
- Ponios Alisos gimtadienis, two plays – Vilnius: Lietuvos rašytojų sąjungos leidykla, 2010

In English

- Juknaitė, Vanda (2007). My Voice Betrays Me. East European Monographs. ISBN 978-0-88033-606-2.
