= Jurga Ivanauskaitė =

Lithuanian writer

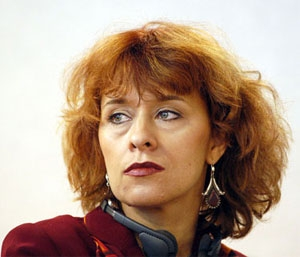
- Born: 14 November 1961; Vilnius, Lithuanian SSR, Soviet Union
- Died: 17 February 2007 (aged 45); Vilnius, Lithuania
- Resting place: Antakalnis Cemetery
- Education: Vilnius Academy of Arts
- Occupation: Writer
- Writing career
- Language: Lithuanian
- Notable work: The Year of the Lilies of the Valley

Jurga Ivanauskaitė (14 November 1961 – 17 February 2007) was a Lithuanian writer.

She was born in Vilnius, Lithuania. While studying at the Vilnius Art Academy, she wrote her first book, The Year of the Lilies of the Valley, published in 1985. She subsequently published six novels, a children's book and a book of essays. Her works have been translated into several languages, including English, Latvian, Polish, Russian, German, French and Swedish.

After her visits in the Far East, she became an active supporter of the Tibet liberation movement.

She died from soft tissue sarcoma in Vilnius at the age of 45 and is interred in the Antakalnis Cemetery.

== Works translated into English ==
- Two Stories About Suicide (short story) in: Description of a Struggle: The Vintage Book of Contemporary Eastern European Writing translated from the Lithuanian by Laima Sruoginis
- The Day that Never Happened (short story) in: Lithuania in Her Own Words : Anthology of Contemporary Lithuanian Wriring Tyto Alba, 1997, Vilnius.
- Gone with the Dreams (excerpt from novel) in: The Earth Remains: An anthology of contemporary Lithuanian prose Tyto Alba, 2002, Vilnius.
