= Lithuanian Writers' Union =

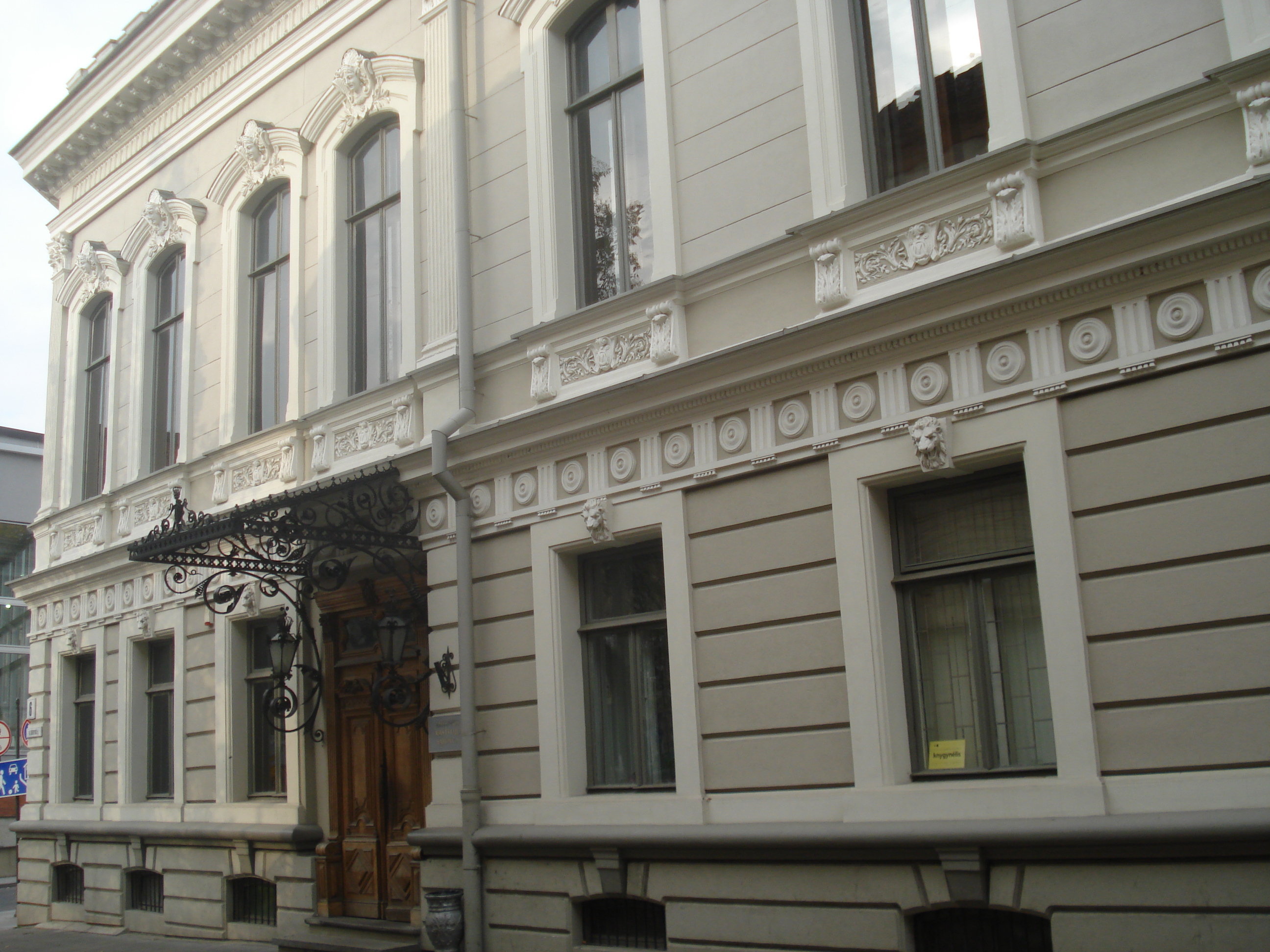
Lithuanian Writers' Union

The Lithuanian Association for Writers (Lithuanian: Lietuvos rašytojų sąjunga) is an association for writers and poets in Lithuania, founded in 1922. It gives annual prizes and awards to talented Lithuanian writers.

The Association also has its own publishing house.
