= Kristján B. Jónasson =

Icelandic book publisher

Kristján B. Jónasson is an Icelandic book publisher at Crymogea Publishing and the former head of the Association of Icelandic Book Publishers. He has written on Sigurður Nordal.
