= Potencija Pinkauskaitė =

Lithuanian actor

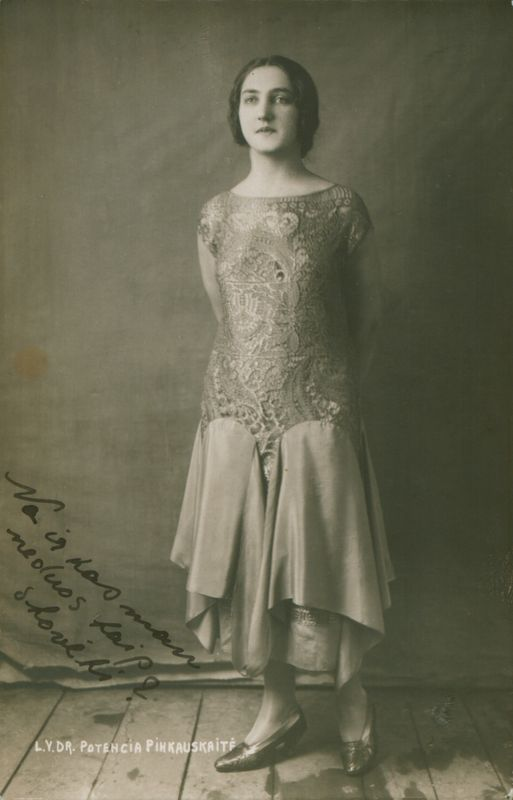
- Pinkauskaitė c. 1922
- Born: 22 August 1897; Joniškis, Russian Empire
- Died: 9 April 1984 (aged 86); Vilnius, Lithuanian SSR
- Occupation: Theater actress
- Years active: 1913–1968

Potencija Pinkauskaitė (22 August 1897 – 9 April 1984) was a leading character actress of interwar Lithuanian theater, representative of the first generation of professional Lithuanian theater actors.

== Family and early years ==
Potencija Pinkauskaitė was born into a poor family of Simonas and Elžbieta Pinkauskas in Joniškis. The family soon moved to Riga, where at that time existed a large Lithuanian colony up to 50,000. In 1907, her father left for two years for the United States to work in a Boston steel plant.

In Riga, Pinkauskaitė debuted in an amateur theater of the Lithuanian community's organization "Pašalpa". Her first role was mother in Three Beloved (Trys mylimosios) by Žemaitė. In 1914, she played a role of mother in comedy Intelligentsia by Dāvids Šveņķis, also staged by the amateurs of "Pašalpa".

During World War I, the family moved to Mariupol, where Pinkauskaitė finished gymnasium. After the war, the family then returned to Riga, where they lived till 1920, when Pinkauskaitė's parents decided to return to the home town of Joniškis and she moved to Kaunas. During the Riga period, she performed in Love Parodies (Meilės parodijos) by Bolesław Gorczyński, Živilė by Vincas Nagornoskis, Poor We (Gaila mūsų) by Ludwik Adam Dmuszewski, Weaver Under the Cross (Verpėja po kryžiumi) by Franciszka Omańkowska, Out of Love (Iš meilės) by Ivan Togobochny, Our dear (Mūsų gerasis) by Žemaitė, One of us must marry (Vienas iš mūsų turi apsivesti) by Jean Baptista von Schweitzer. Most of these plays were staged by Jurgis Linartas.

== Career ==
=== In Kaunas (1920–1931) ===
In Kaunas, Pinkauskaitė joined the troupe of Juozas Vaičkus, but soon transferred to the theater studio of Antanas Sutkus. The studio evolved into the improvisational Vilkolakis Theatre directed by Balys Sruoga and Sutkus till its closing in 1925. She also studied at ballet school of Olga Dubenieckienė in 1921–1923.

In 1920–1925, Pinkauskaitė worked at the Kaunas City Theater or Folk Theater (Tautos teatras), organized and directed by Sutkus. In 1925–1931, she worked at the State Theater, which was the first professional Lithuanian theater.

In 1926–1927, she also played at Our Theater (Mūsų teatras) in Kaunas.

She played various character roles: beggars, witches, washerwomen, aunts, old moms, nuns.

=== In Šiauliai (1931–1968) ===
In 1931, Pinkauskaitė together with part of the Kaunas troupe relocated to Šiauliai to work at a new division of the State Theater. The theater was located in the building of Šiauliai cinema Kapitol and frequently toured around northern Lithuania and Samogitia.

On 1 June 1935, the Šiauliai section of the State Theater with its troupe was relocated to Klaipėda and renamed as the Klaipėda Section of the State Theater. The theater remained there until 23 March 1939 (Lithuania lost Klaipėda Region to Nazi Germany as a result of the ultimatum). The theater moved back to Šiauliai. During these relocations and after World War II, Pinkauskaitė continued to work in its troupe. In 1961, she retired, but continued to play occasional roles. In 1968, she played her last role of Viltichen in Hauptmann's The Sunken Bell.

In 1959–1970, Pinkauskaitė also taught declamation at the Šiauliai Pedagogic Institute and managed several school drama studios in Šiauliai.

Pinkauskaitė died in 1984 and was buried in Antakalnis Cemetery in Vilnius.

== Major roles ==
=== Theater ===
- Kindė in Šarūnas by Vincas Krėvė (1929).
- Queen Elizabeth I in Mary Stuart by Friedrich Schiller (1935)
- Mother in Blow, the wind (Pūsk, vėjeli!) by Rainis (1935 and 1951).
- Knirchi in Hope by Herman Heijermans (1936)
- Vingienė in Daughter-in-Law by Žemaitė (1946)
- Mrs. Grande in Eugénie Grandet by Honoré de Balzac (1952)
- Normantienė in Sweet Money (Pinigėliai) by Sofija Kymantaitė-Čiurlionienė (1953)
- Vasa in Vasa Zheleznova by Maxim Gorki (1956).

=== Photoes in roles ===
- 1925 Washerwoman in comedy Mon Bébé by Maurice Hennequin, stated by Konstantinas Glinskis.
- 1926: Margarita in Fishermen (Žvejai) by Stasys Santvaras, staged by Borisas Dauguvietis
- 1931 Sereikienė in comedy Patriots (Patriotai) by Pertas Vaičiūnas, staged by Juozas Stanulis
- 1954: Maria in Uncle Vania by Anton Chekhov with J. Zubėnas as Serebriakov

=== Cinema ===
- Jonukas' mother in Jonukas and Onutė by Jurgis Linartas and Vladas Sipaitis (1931).
- Episode role of a woman in court in Lithuanian TV-series American tragedy (Amerikietiška tragedija) (1981), based on a novel by Theodore Dreiser.

== Memory ==
In 1991, non-governmental Lithuanian Foundation of Culture established Potencija Pinkauskaitė Price for theater achievements.

On 9 February 1995, a memorial plaque and a bust of Pinkauskaitė, created by the Lithuanian sculptor Aloyzas Toleikis, was unveiled on Vilnius Street in Šiauliai.

== Awards ==
- 1939, 4th Order of the Lithuanian Grand Duke Gediminas
- 1956, People's Artist of the Lithuanian SSR
