= Tautiška giesmė =

National anthem of Lithuania

English: "National Song"
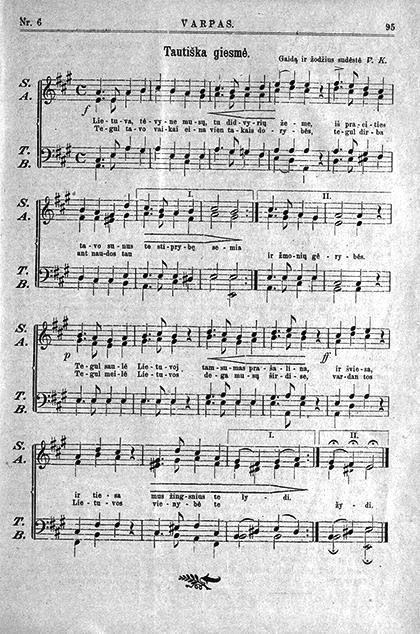
- National anthem of Lithuania
- Also known as: „Lietuva, Tėvyne mūsų“ (English: "Lithuania, Our Homeland"); Lietuvos himnas (English: "Anthem of Lithuania")
- Lyrics: Vincas Kudirka, 13 November 1898
- Music: Vincas Kudirka, 1898
- Published: 1899
- Adopted: 1919; 107 years ago
- Readopted: 1988; 38 years ago
- Relinquished: 1940; 86 years ago (Note: The Soviet authorities briefly reinstated the anthem for a period between 1944 and 1950.)

Audio sample
- U.S. Navy Band instrumental version: file; help

Official orchestral and choral vocal recording

"Tautiška giesmė" (pronounced [ˈtˠɐʊtʲɪʃˠkɐ ɡʲɪɛsʲˈmʲeː]; 'National Song') or "Lietuvos himnas" ('Anthem of Lithuania'), also known by its incipit "Lietuva, Tėvyne mūsų" (Note: With Tėvyne sometimes uncapitalised.) ('Lithuania, Our Homeland'), is the national anthem of Lithuania. The music and lyrics were written in 1898 by Vincas Kudirka, when Lithuania was still part of the Russian Empire. The fifty-word poem was a condensation of Kudirka's conceptions of the Lithuanian state, the Lithuanian people, and their past. Shortly before his death in 1899, the anthem was performed for Lithuanians living in Saint Petersburg, Russia.

The first public Lithuanian performance of the anthem took place in Vilnius in 1905, and it became the official national anthem in 1919, a year after Lithuania declared its independence.

"Tautiška giesmė" was reinstated in 1989 shortly before the reestablishment of Lithuanian independence and confirmed in the National Anthem Act of 21 October 1991. It was automatically included as the national anthem in 1992, when the new Constitution was ratified after independence from the Soviet Union was achieved. The status of "Tautiška giesmė" as the national anthem of Lithuania was further confirmed in 1999 with the passage of a national law stating this.

== Creation ==
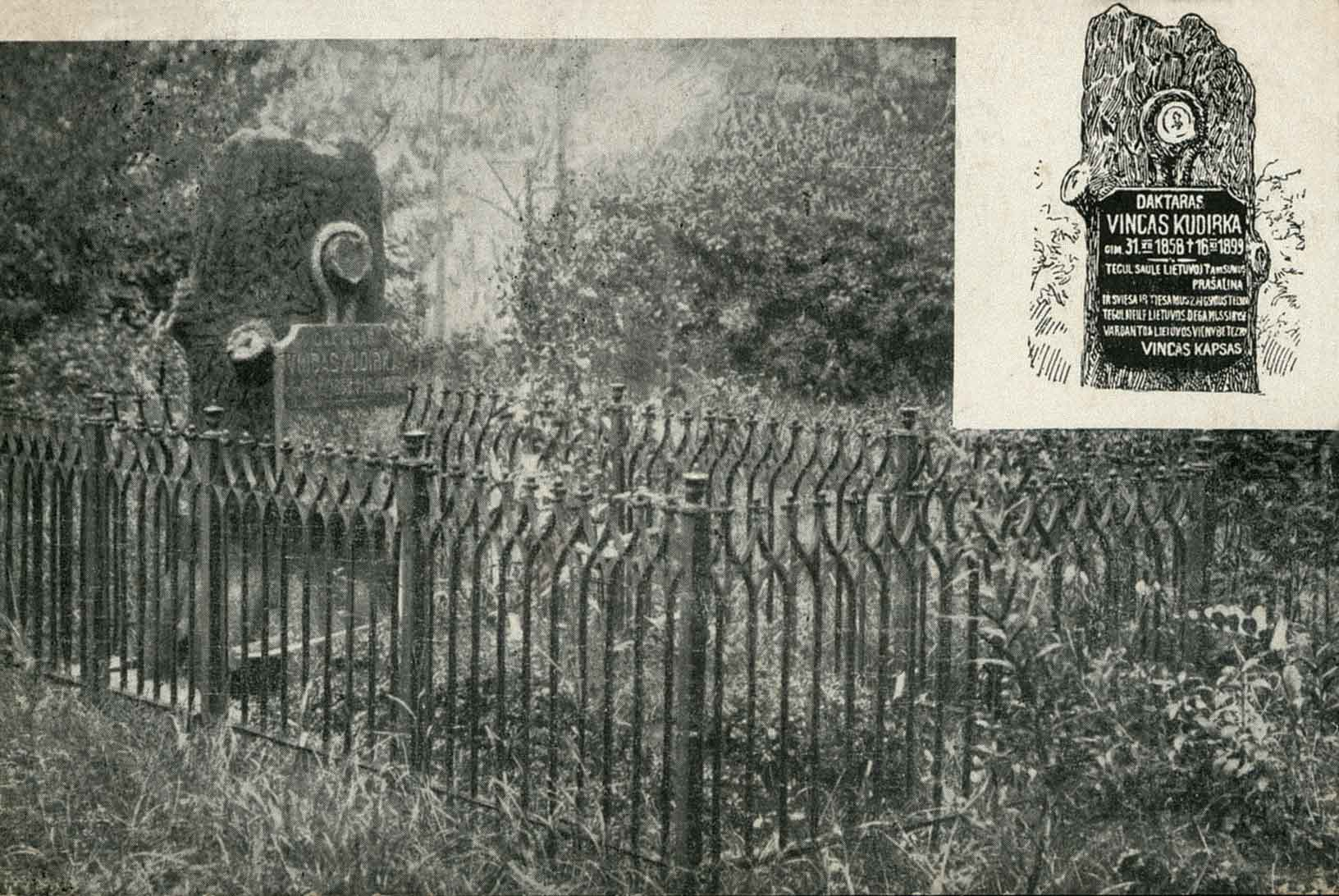
The tomb of Vincas Kudirka includes the lines from Tautiška giesmė.

At the time when the poem Lietuva, Tėvyne mūsų was written, Lithuania was part of the Russian Empire. Kudirka, a medical student at the University of Warsaw, was writing as a columnist for the newspaper Varpas ('The Bell'). In his Varpas columns, Kudirka urged Lithuanians to take pride in their heritage, discussed the problems the Russian Government was causing the Lithuanian population, and denounced those who wished to work for the Tsarist autocracy. In the course of writing for Varpas, he wrote down his thoughts on what Lithuania was and what it should be, resulting in the fifty-word poem Lietuva, Tėvynė mūsų.

The poem described the heroic past of Lithuania and exhorted its people to care for the land, care for humanity, and live in honor. Kudirka also urged the country to become a source of enlightenment and virtue. Without a melody, Kudirka took the time to compose the music just before dying of tuberculosis. Both the melody and the lyrics were printed in Varpas in September 1898. Upon his death in 1899, Kudirka's tomb was engraved with the second stanza of the anthem (later destroyed by the authorities).

The third stanza's second part says "Ir šviesa, ir tiesa / Mūs žingsnius telydi" (Both light and truth / Lead our steps). Kudirka, who spent two years in the Sejny Priest Seminary, knew the Traditional Latin Mass texts, which start with Psalm 43 (Iudica me Deus), where the third stanza of the prayer says "O send out thy light and thy truth: let them lead me". Thus, Kudirka subtly paraphrased a part of the Bible and the Catholic Mass into the Lithuanian national anthem.

=== Religion ===
There is an alternative version of the anthem that mentions God instead of the sun in the first two sentences of the third stanza, which would give "Tegul Dievas Lietuvoj / Tamsumas prašalina" (May God in Lithuania / Darkness dispel).

In 1942–1943, during the German occupation of Lithuania during World War II, when the German occupation authorities criticized the singing of non-religious hymns, namely the Lithuanian national anthem, in Catholic churches, the word "sun" in the Lithuanian anthem was replaced with God. This was done particularly in the St. Johns' Church in Vilnius, where Fr. Alfonsas Lipniūnas preached his sermons.

On 22 October 1991, the Reconstituent Seimas deputies Vytautas Puplauskas, Alfonsas Svarinskas, Virgilijus Čepaitis, Romualda Hofertienė, and Albertas Miškinis unsuccessfully proposed to replace the mention of sun with God.

Albinas Kurtinaitis claims that Kudirka's first draft in late 1897 mentioned God instead of the sun, but that Kudirka was allegedly convinced by his atheist colleagues from the Varpas newspaper and in March 1898 he changed the mention of God to sun in order to be more inclusive. However, Renata Vitkauskienė argues that the mention of sun was there from the start, because that's the version that was printed, whereas the hymn's manuscript and notes are missing.

== History ==
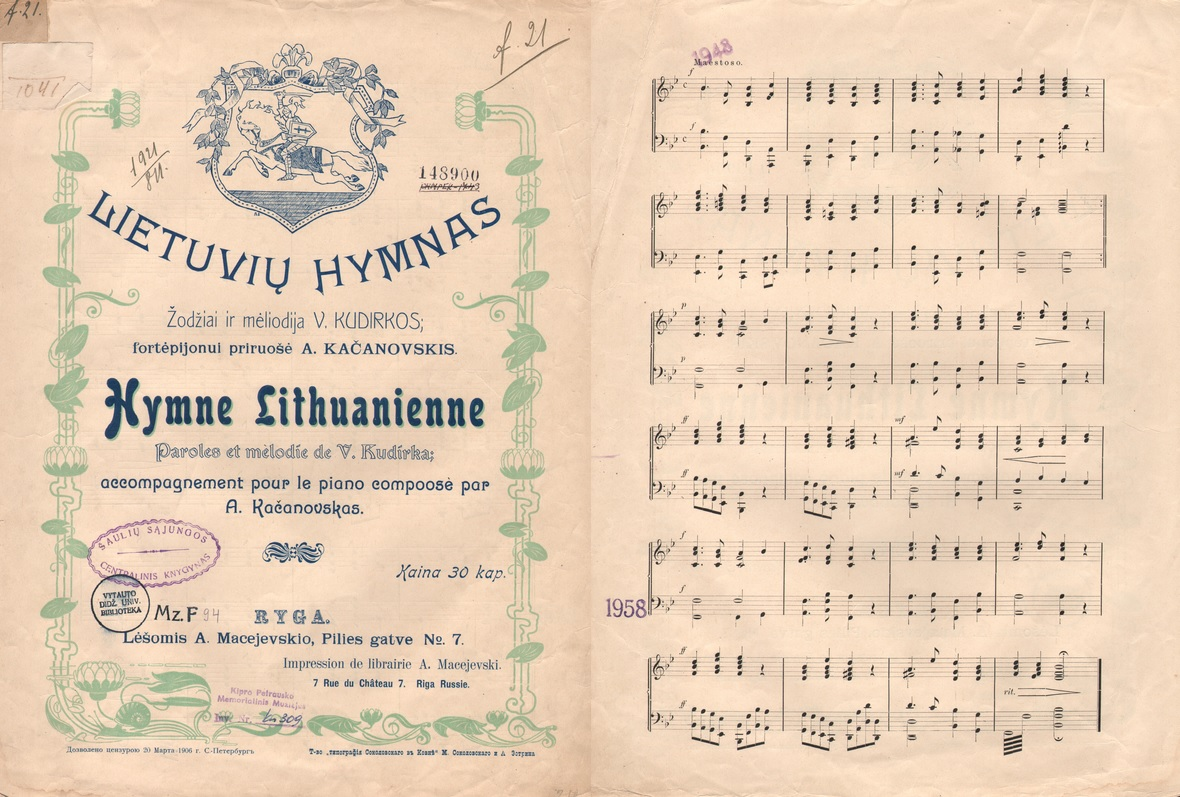
The notes of the anthem adapted for piano. Published by the composer Aleksandras Kačanauskas, circa 1906.

=== Pre-independent Lithuania ===
Before Kudirka's death, the first performance of the poem occurred in 1899 at a concert in St. Petersburg, Russia. The concert was conducted by Česlovas Sasnauskas and was attended by Lithuanians, which St. Petersburg had the largest population of at that time. The anthem was first performed in Lithuania during the Great Seimas of Vilnius on 3 December 1905.

=== Independent Lithuania ===
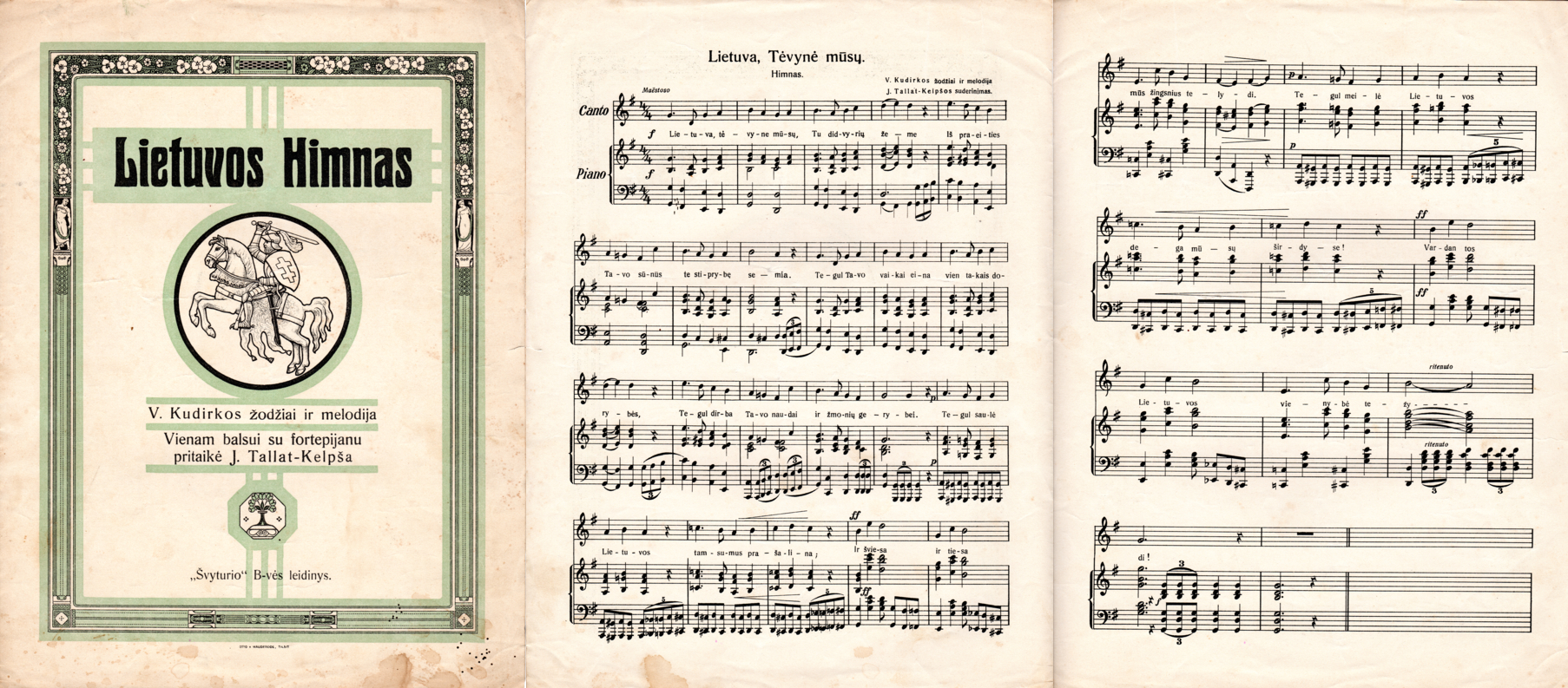
A booklet by Juozas Tallat-Kelpša with the national anthem of Lithuania. Published during the interwar period.

When Lithuania declared its independence from Russia in 1918, the song was declared the national anthem. It held this status until Lithuania was annexed into the Soviet Union during World War II. During the interwar period, there had been suggestions to modify the words to include a reference to God. It was decided, in Kudirka's memory, that the lyrics should remain as he had written them.

=== Usage in German-occupied Lithuania ===
In 1942, between May 9 and May 12, the Marijampolė Commissariat took 580 young men as labour for the German Army Transportation Service. At the barracks, about 3,000–4,000 appeared, about two thirds of women and girls, and began to shout out: "We are not Germans, do not go to the front." At that time, about 70% of the troops returned to the barracks yard to support the demonstration as well as students from the Marijampole Teachers Seminary and the Marijampole Gymnasium. The demonstrators sang Lithuanian liberation songs and "Tautiška giesmė". When threatened with a fight by several insufficiently armed local commando soldiers, the protest turned violent with members of the crowd breaking some windows. Finally, the crowd gathered on the street to walk to the city. In that direction, the soldiers of the Wehrmacht stoned the truck.

While singing the national anthem, the Lithuanian policemen paid homage, and weighed on two of them. The soldiers of the 1st Police Battalion in the Marijampolė were completely passive, with regard, to the crowd.

=== Usage during the Soviet occupation ===
==== 1940–1941 ====
Immediately following the Soviet occupation of Lithuania, the government of the Lithuanian SSR published a new constitution, the Stalinist Constitution of the Lithuanian SSR, that regulates the usage of the new flag and the new coat of arms as a symbol of the socialist identity. However, in this constitution, there was no regulations on a regional anthem for the Lithuanian SSR. According to Soviet custom, all of the republics of the Soviet Union had the "Internationale" translated into their own language as regional anthems.

The officially-introduced "Internationale" in Lithuania was unpopular and the majority of the population of Lithuania disliked it as most Lithuanians then still remembered the "Tautiška giesmė" as being their actual national anthem. This was particularly evident when the authorities gathered all of the teachers in 14–15 August 1940 at the Lithuanian Teachers' Congress in Kaunas. The congress was attended by more than 10,000 primary and secondary school teachers and high school lecturers. Of all the speakers, only the Prime Minister of Lithuania, Vincas Krėvė-Mickevičius, reminded the audience of the Lithuanian national anthem, concluding his speech: "Light and truth all along, guide our steps forever." At the end of the congress the orchestra began playing the Internationale. A teacher began to sing the Tautiška Giesmė. Other teachers joined in singing the anthem, and shortly all of the teachers that attended the congress sang along, thus publicly testifying about "their determination to serve their homeland, but not the occupier". Inspired by them, the orchestra followed them standing.

==== 1944–1950 ====
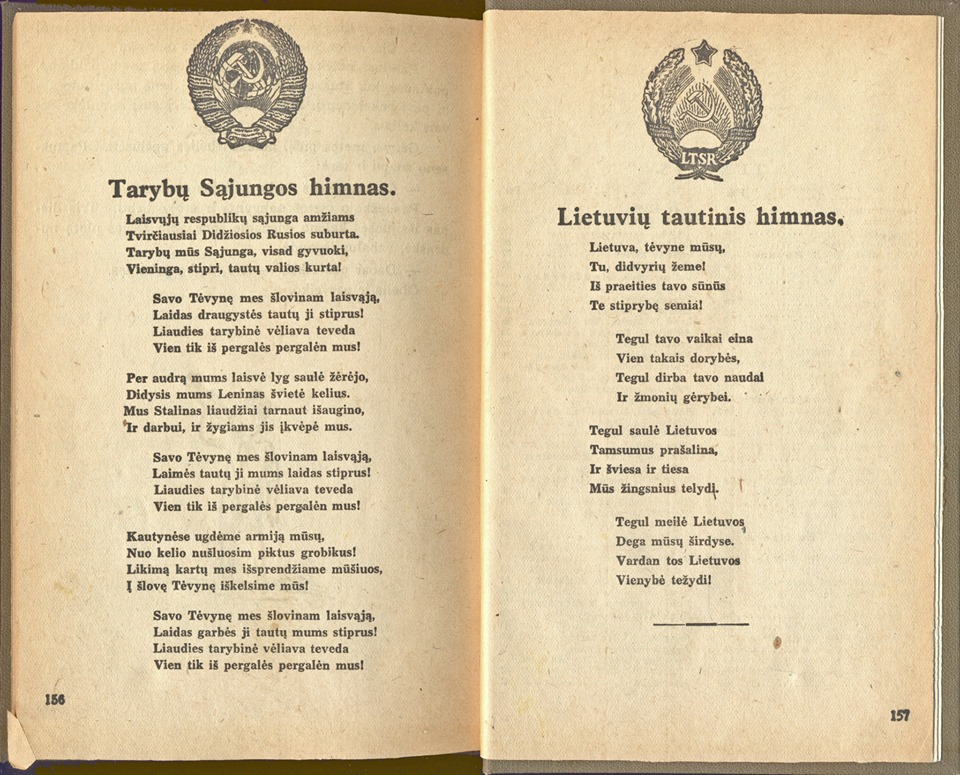
The anthem of the USSR and the Lithuanian SSR in 1946, before Tautiška giesmė was banned by the Soviet authorities.

The issue about the anthem was raised again after the re-occupation of the Baltic States, after Lithuania was forcibly re-incorporated into the USSR as the Lithuanian SSR. A new anthem of the USSR was made, and the lyrics of the anthem were translated to the languages of the USSR republics. The original plan was to use the translated anthem as the temporary anthem, until a new, more socialist anthem was made.

During the translation process, Antanas Venclova as the translator, expressed worries over the lyrics. The lyrics mentioned Великая Русь (English: Great Russia), which he translated to Didžiosios Rusios. He feared that the part of the lyrics would be badly accepted in Lithuania, because the lyrics showed the superiority of the Russian nation in Lithuania, and the spirit of national revival that was suppressed after the occupation of Lithuania. The translation of the anthem itself was submitted on 5 January 1944, and was approved two days later.

On 26 January 1944, in the session of the Supreme Council of the USSR, the council adopted a resolution about the rights of all of the Soviet republics to hold their national military formations and Foreign Affairs Commissariat. The resolution was an attempt by the USSR to provide a semblance of independent statehood for the Soviet republics and create places for each of them in the UN. Even before the session, Justas Paleckis proposed to the USSR Commissioner for Foreign Affairs of the People's Commissars, Vyacheslav Molotov, to consider whether the Soviet republics were allowed to have their own anthems. Molotov reported that the Politburo had decided to offer the Soviet republics to create their own anthems.

With the offer from the USSR government, the question of the Lithuanian anthem was re-discussed. The first proposal of the anthem was the song "Mes su Stalinu" ('We Are with Stalin'), which was proposed by G. Alexandrov to Kazys Preikšas. Other proposals proposed by G. Alexandrov was Tautiška giesmė, and other popular songs, including a poem by Petras Vaičiūnas "Ei, pasauli, mes be Vilniaus nenurimsime".

On 1 June 1944, the Central Committee of the Communist Party of Lithuania prepared a draft resolution of the national anthem of Lithuania:

"At the present political situation, it is expedient to use the national anthem of Lithuania, in the Lithuanian SSR, to use its popularity and the opportunity to turn it into a weapon of strengthening the Soviet power to create a national anthem of the Lithuanian SSR ..."

The main points of the decree were:

1. To allow the performance of music and text of the old Lithuanian national anthem, Tautiška giesmė, created in the end the 19th century by Vincas Kudirka as the National Anthem of the Lithuanian SSR
2. To delay the question about the creation of the anthem of the Lithuanian until the time when it will be possible to attract all creative forces of the nation, and to create a hymn that reflects a new era in the life of the Lithuanian nation and the changes of the country's economy, culture and people's minds.

In the same draft resolution, it was envisaged that the lyrics and the melody of the Tautiška giesmė will be approved by the Presidium of the Supreme Council of the Lithuanian SSR and the Presidium of the Supreme Soviet of the USSR.

The question of the creation of a new anthem of the Lithuanian SSR returned a year later. In 1945, from September 28 to 29, the issue was held at the meeting of the Lithuanian Communist Party Central Committee Bureau. In the meeting, it was decided that a new anthem of the Lithuanian SSR was needed to reflect the socio-political change in Lithuania. A commission was organized to make the new national anthem of the Lithuanian SSR.

The committee consisted of K. Preikšas as the chairman, Justas Paleckis, Juozas Banaitis, Juozas Žiugžda, and the Honored Artists of the Lithuanian SSR, Professor Juozas Gruodis, Kostas Korsakas, and Vladas Niunka. The lyrics and the melody of the national anthem of the Lithuanian SSR should be submitted no later than on 1 January 1946. However, the anthem wasn't submitted in the deadline. A new commission for the anthem was created, consisted of Antanas Venclova, Teofilis Tilvytis, Juozas Melnikas, Valerija Valsiūnienė, Eduardas Mieželaitis, Vacys Reimeris and Aleksys Churginas. Due to the active national partisan struggle in Lithuania, the plans of the new national anthem was relinquished. Apparently, the authorities believed that replacing Tautiška giesmė with a new one would further aggravate dissatisfaction of the population with the political system.

Of all the Soviet Baltic republics, only Lithuania managed to maintain the usage of their previous national anthem. The anthem was used until 1950. In occupied Latvia and Estonia, new anthems were created and approved in 1945. Due to the different opinions about the anthem of the Lithuanian SSR, Justas Paleckis proposed to change the words of the Tautiška giesmė. However, the proposed idea was rejected.

==== 1950 ====
After the decline in Lithuanian partisan activity, the authorities concluded that it was safe to introduce the new anthem. On 15 July 1950, in the 10th anniversary of the incorporation of Lithuania to the Soviet Union, the Presidium of the Supreme Council of the Lithuanian SSR approved a new anthem. The music for the anthem was composed by Balys Dvarionas and Jonas Švedas, and the words were written originally by Antanas Venclova. The anthem was confirmed in Article 169 of the 1978 Constitution of the Lithuanian SSR.

==== 1950–1988 ====
Even though Tautiška giesmė was used as the national anthem of the Lithuanian SSR for six years, the anthem ended up being banned in the Lithuanian SSR after the introduction and the approval of the new anthem. During this period, the "Tautiška giesmė" became a symbol of national resistance to the Soviet Union. The anthem was often sung at various festivities in families and in small gatherings of trusted people.

==== 1988–1990 ====
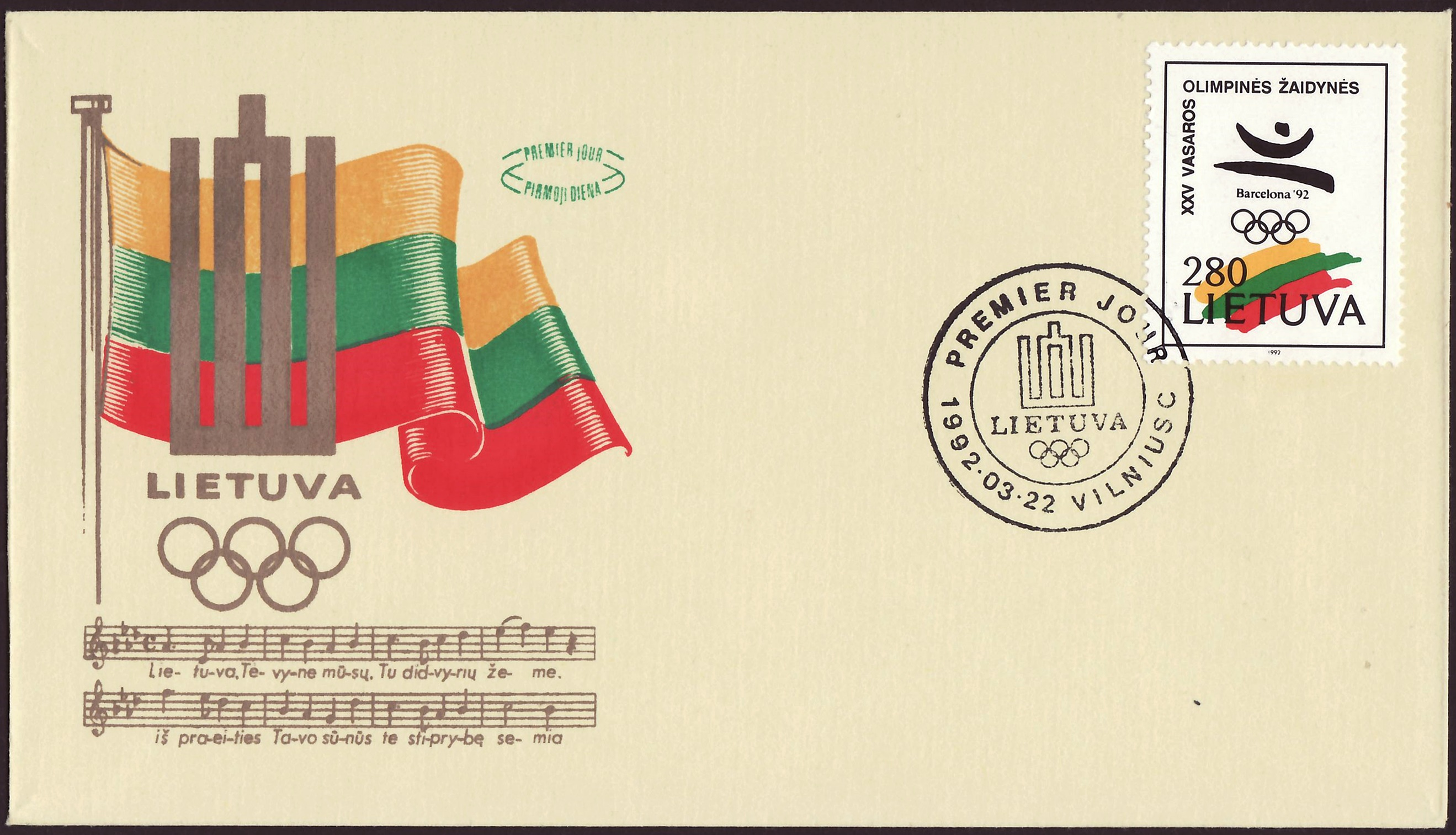
First day cover of the 1992 Summer Olympics, with the first stanza of the anthem.

On 6 October 1988, "Tautiška giesmė" was approved as a replacement for the State Anthem of the Lithuanian SSR. The preliminary approval was made by the Supreme Soviet of the Lithuanian SSR and successive legislative bodies.

=== Current status ===
The status of "Tautiška giesmė" as the national anthem of the Lithuanian Republic was reconfirmed in 1992. In that year, the Constitution of Lithuania was approved; Article 19 of the document states that Tautiška giesmė will be the national anthem of Lithuania. The last law in relation to the national anthem was passed in 1999; it contained the official lyrics and protocol on how and when to play the anthem.

=== 2015 Taoyuan incident ===
During the medal ceremony for Lithuanian team in 2015 World Deaf Basketball Championships in Taoyuan, Taiwan, where they won the final against the United States, the organizers of the tournament erroneously played the Soviet-era anthem instead of the actual anthem, upsetting the Lithuanians. The team, led by coach Algimantas Šatas, was forced to stand in dais during the entirety of the song. Later, the organizers recognized the mistake and apologized, stated that they had downloaded the wrong song in last minutes shortly before the ceremony.

== 1999 law ==
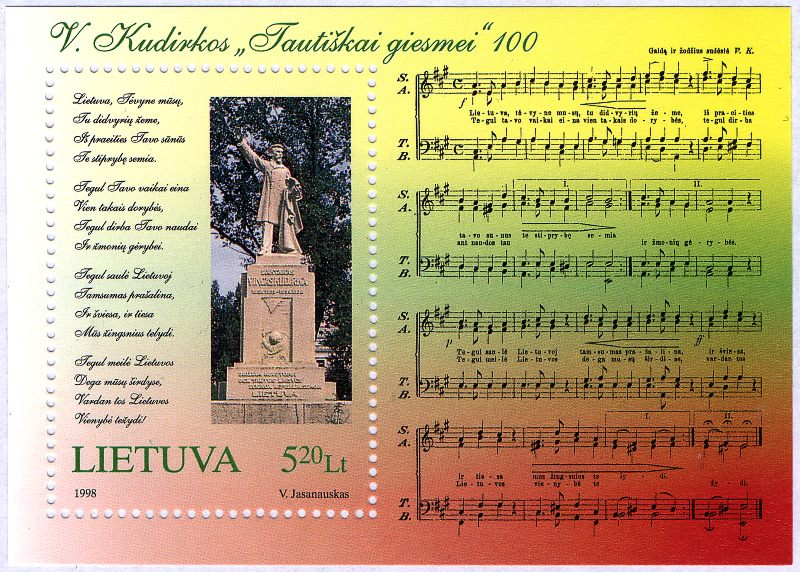
Commemorative stamp issued by Lietuvos paštas in 1998, for the 100th anniversary of Tautiška giesmė.

Signed into law by President Valdas Adamkus on 9 June 1999, the "Law on the National Anthem of the Republic of Lithuania" details when and where the national anthem is played and its performance protocols.

Article 2 of the law states that the anthem is to be played at the following occasions: At the beginning or ending of solemn sessions of the Seimas, on national holidays and memorial days, and at receptions and farewells of foreign heads of state on official visits to Lithuania—but only after the anthem of the foreign country has been played.

It is played in foreign countries to represent Lithuania, according to their own diplomatic protocols; on national holidays and other days when the flag is raised by order of the government; when the flag is raised during public events sponsored by governmental institutions, business, and organizations; and at the beginning and end of National Radio programming. The anthem may also be played at other occasions, such as sporting competitions.

When playing the anthem, the music may be either live or recorded. The anthem may be performed with a choir, an orchestra, a military band, or a combination of the latter two. Article 4, Section 2, states that all participants are encouraged to sing the national anthem. When the anthem is played, all civilians are asked to stand in a gesture of respect to the anthem. If employees of national defense, police, and other military or military-related organizations are present, they must respect the anthem in a way prescribed by their statutes. The anthem cannot be used as background music, purposes of advertisement, or for entertainment, such as karaoke. Public disrespect of the anthem may be punishable by law.

== Lyrics ==
Lithuanian original

Lietuva, Tėvyne mūsų,
Tu didvyrių žeme,
Iš praeities Tavo sūnūs
Te stiprybę semia.

Tegul Tavo vaikai eina
Vien takais dorybės,
Tegul dirba Tavo naudai
Ir žmonių gėrybei.

Tegul saulė Lietuvoj (Note: In the interwar period, Lietuvoj was written as Lietuvos (in the genitive rather than prepositional case). The change to Lietuvoj was somewhat controversial, and Lietuvos is sometimes still sung.)
Tamsumas prašalina, (Note: In the interwar period, tamsumas was written as tamsumus, with the rare type IV masculine noun ending. Tamsumus is occasionally still sung.)
Ir šviesa, ir tiesa
Mūs žingsnius telydi.

Tegul meilė Lietuvos
Dega mūsų širdyse,
Vardan tos, Lietuvos
Vienybė težydi!

IPA transcription (Note: See Help:IPA/Lithuanian and Lithuanian phonology.)

[lʲiæ.tˠʊ.ˈvˠɐ | tʲeː.ˈvʲiː.nʲæ ˈmˠuː.sˠuː |]
[tˠʊ dʲɪd.ˈvʲiː.rʲuː ˈʒʲæ.mʲæ |]
[ɪʃ prˠɐ.ɛɪ̯ˑ.ˈtʲiæs ˈtˠɐ.vˠoː ˈsˠuː.nˠuːs]
[tʲæ stʲɪ.ˈprʲiː.bʲæː ˈsʲæ.mʲæ ǁ]

[tʲæː.ˈgʊlˠ ˈtˠɐ.vˠoː vˠɐɪ̯ˑ.ˈkɐɪ̯ˑ ˈɛɪ̯ˑ.nˠɐ]
[vʲiæn tˠɐ.ˈkɐɪ̯ˑz‿dˠoː.ˈrʲiː.bʲeːs |]
[tʲæː.ˈgʊlˠ ˈdʲɪr.bˠɐ ˈtˠɐ.vˠoː ˈnˠɐʊ̯.dˠɐɪ̯ˑ]
[ɪr ʒmˠoː.ˈnʲuː gʲeː.ˈrʲiː.bʲɛɪ̯ˑ ǁ]

[tʲæː.ˈgʊlˠ ˈsˠɐʊ̯.lʲeː lʲiæ.tˠʊ.ˈvˠoːj]
[ˈtˠɐm.sˠʊ.mˠɐs prˠɐ.ˈʃˠɐ.lʲɪ.nˠɐ |]
[ɪrˠ ʃvʲiæ.ˈsˠɐ | ɪr tʲiæ.ˈsˠɐ]
[mˠuːz‿ʒʲɪŋg.ˈsnʲʊs tʲæ.ˈlʲiː.dʲɪ ǁ]

[tʲæː.ˈgʊlˠ ˈmʲæːj.lʲeː lʲiæ.tˠʊ.ˈvˠoːs]
[ˈdʲæː.gɐ ˈmˠuː.sˠuː ʃʲɪr.dʲiː.ˈsʲæ |]
[vˠɐr.ˈdˠɐn tˠoːs | lʲiæ.tˠʊ.ˈvˠoːs]
[vʲiæ.ˈnʲiː.bʲeː tʲæ.ˈʒʲiː.dʲɪ ǁ]

English translation

Lithuania, our homeland,
Land of worshiped heroes!
Let your sons draw their strength
From our past experience.

Let your children always follow
Only roads of virtue,
May your own, mankind’s well-being
Be the goals they work for.

May the sun above our land
Banish darkening clouds around
Light and truth all along
Guide our steps forever.

May the love of Lithuania
Brightly burn in our hearts.
For the sake of this land
Let unity blossom.

== Sheet music ==
The Lithuanian National Culture Centre has created several sheet music for the anthem. Below are the sheet music for the anthem:

- Men's Choir (tenor and bass)
- Women's Choir (soprano and alto)
- Mixed Choir (soprano, alto, tenor and bass)

== See also ==
- Anthem of the Lithuanian Soviet Socialist Republic
- List of national anthems
