= Švyturys Camp =

Lithuanian-American youth camp

Švyturys Camp (Švyturio stovykla) is an educational and cultural camp organized by Lithuanian National Guard, a non-profit organisation, for Lithuanian-American youth. Held for the first time in 2024, the camp brought together participants aged 12 to 17 from U.S. states to be taught survival skills, basic first aid, and Lithuanian history. Participant activities include Lithuanian flag-raising ceremonies, singing the national anthem of Lithuania, and lectures on Lithuanian history and culture.

The camp aims to expand cultural education and preserve identity within the Lithuanian diaspora. Many second and third-generation Lithuanian Americans struggle to maintain connections with their heritage, and this camp offers a way to reinvigorate that relationship through immersive experiences.

== Awards ==
In 2024, Švyturys Camp was nominated for an award for initiatives promoting Lithuanian statehood and civic engagement.

== Badge ==
The camp's logo features the image of a lighthouse, representing a role for the camp as a beacon of knowledge and cultural connection for participants.
