= Venclova =

Venclova is a Lithuanian surname. Notable people with the surname include:

- Antanas Venclova (1906–1971), Soviet Lithuanian poet, journalist and translator
- Tomas Venclova (born 1937), Lithuanian writer, translator, and poet
