= Marčiulionis =

- Lithuanian surname
- m.: Marčiulionis
- f.: (unmarried): Marčiulionytė
- f.: (married): Marčiulionienė
- f.: (short): Marčiulione

Marčiulionis is a Lithuanian surname. Notable people with the surname include:

- Aleksandras Marčiulionis (1911–1998), Lithuanian sculptor
- Augustas Marčiulionis (born 2002), Lithuanian basketball player
- Danute Marčiulionienė (born 1938), biologist and ecologist, pioneer of radioecological research in Lithuania
- Ina Marčiulionytė, Lithuanian linguist, politician, and diplomat
- Šarūnas Marčiulionis (born 1964), Lithuanian basketball player
- Kęstutis Marčiulionis (born 1977), Lithuanian basketball player
