= Anthem of the Lithuanian Soviet Socialist Republic =

Lietuvos Tarybų Socialistinės Respublikos (LTSR) himnas
English: Anthem of the Lithuanian Soviet Socialist Republic (LSSR)
- Sheet music
- Former regional anthem of the Lithuanian SSR
- Lyrics: Antanas Venclova
- Music: Balys Dvarionas and Jonas Švedas
- Adopted: 1950
- Relinquished: November 18, 1988
- Preceded by: „Tautiška giesmė“
- Succeeded by: „Tautiška giesmė“

Audio sample
- Instrumental rendition in C-sharp major: file; help

The State Anthem of the Lithuanian Soviet Socialist Republic was an anthem of Lithuania under Soviet occupation from 1950 to 1989.

== History ==
During the Soviet occupation in Lithuania, the anthem was officially adopted by the Lithuanian Soviet government in 1950, substituted for "Tautiška giesmė", which had been used as a national anthem of Lithuania since 1944. In 1988, the official anthem of the Republic of Lithuania, "Tautiška giesmė", was once again openly utilized as the Lithuanian anthem, and its status as the national anthem was restored by the independent Lithuanian government in 1992 and is still used today.

== Background ==
The music was composed by Balys Dvarionas and Jonas Švedas, and the original lyrics authored by Antanas Venclova. After Joseph Stalin's death, Vacys Reimeris changed the second stanza of the lyrics to remove mention of Stalin. The second stanza was changed to state that Lenin had lit the path to freedom, helped by the Russians, led by the party (Reimeris changed the word "Stalin" to "party") and exhorted the Lithuanian people to work with the peoples of the other Soviet Republics. This Soviet era anthem was confirmed in Article 169 of the 1978 Constitution of the Lithuanian SSR.

== Lyrics ==
Vocal
Vocal recording from the 1970s

=== Post-Stalinist version ===
Lithuanian original

Tarybinę Lietuvą liaudis sukūrė,
Už laisvę ir tiesą kovojus ilgai.
Kur Vilnius, kur Nemunas, Baltijos jūra,
Ten klesti mūs miestai, derlingi laukai.

Priedainis:
Tarybų Sąjungoj šlovingoj,
Tarp lygių lygi ir laisva,
Gyvuok per amžius, būk laiminga,
Brangi Tarybų Lietuva!

Į laisvę mums Leninas nušvietė kelią,
Padėjo kovoj didi rusų tauta.
Mus Partija* veda į laimę ir galią,
Tautų mūs draugystė kaip plienas tvirta.

Priedainis

Tėvynė galinga, nebijom pavojų,
Tebūna padangė taiki ir tyra.
Mes darbu sukursim didingą rytojų,
Ir žemę nušvies komunizmo aušra.

Priedainis

English translation

Soviet Lithuania was built by the very people
Who have for ages fought for their freedom.
Where Vilnius, Nemunas, and the Baltic Sea are,
There our cities and our fields blossom.

Refrain:
Within glorious Soviet Union,
Amidst the equal and the free,
Live on for centuries and be happy,
O dear Soviet Lithuania!

The path to freedom Lenin has showed us,
In the fight have the great Russians helped us.
To fortune and power the Party leads us,
Strong as steel is our friendship between nations.

Refrain

Mighty is our fatherland, no danger we fear,
May the skies be peaceful and pure.
Just to build a great tomorrow we'll toil,
The dawn of communism will illuminate our soil.

Refrain

=== Original version ===
Lithuanian original

Tarybinę Lietuvą liaudis sukūrė,
Už savąją laisvę kovojus ilgai.
Kur Vilnius senasis, kur Baltijos jūra,
Ten klesti mūs miestai, derlingi laukai.

Priedainis:
Tarybų Sąjungoj šlovingoj,
Tarp lygių lygi ir laisva,
Gyvuok per amžius, būk laiminga,
Brangi Tarybų Lietuva!

Į laisvę mums Leninas nušvietė kelią,
Padėjo kovoj didi rusų tauta.
Mus Stalinas veda į laimę ir galią,
Tautų mūs draugystė kaip plienas tvirta.

Priedainis

Šalis mūs galinga, nebijom pavojų,
Apginsim Tėvynę nuo priešų visų.
Mes žengiam pirmyn į didingą rytojų
Skaidriuos spinduliuos komunizmo šviesų.

Priedainis

English translation

Soviet Lithuania was built by the very people,
Who have for ages fought for their freedom.
Where old Vilnius is, where the Baltic Sea is,
There our cities and our fields blossom.

Refrain:
Within glorious Soviet Union,
Amidst the equal and the free.
Live on for centuries and be happy,
O dear Soviet Lithuania!

The path to freedom Lenin has showed us,
In the fight have the great Russians helped us.
To fortune and power Stalin leads us,
Strong as steel is our friendship between nations.

Refrain

Mighty is our fatherland, no danger we fear,
Let's defend our homeland from every foe.
We're marching towards a great tomorrow,
Under transparent rays of communism.

Refrain

== Playback incident ==
In 2015, during the victory ceremony for the Lithuanian team in World Deaf Basketball Championships in Taoyuan, Taiwan, where they achieved first place, the Soviet-era song was accidentally played, much to the surprise of the Lithuanians. The organizers promptly acknowledged their mistake and apologized.
