= Vilkolakis Theatre =

Coordinates: 54°53′48″N 23°54′34″E

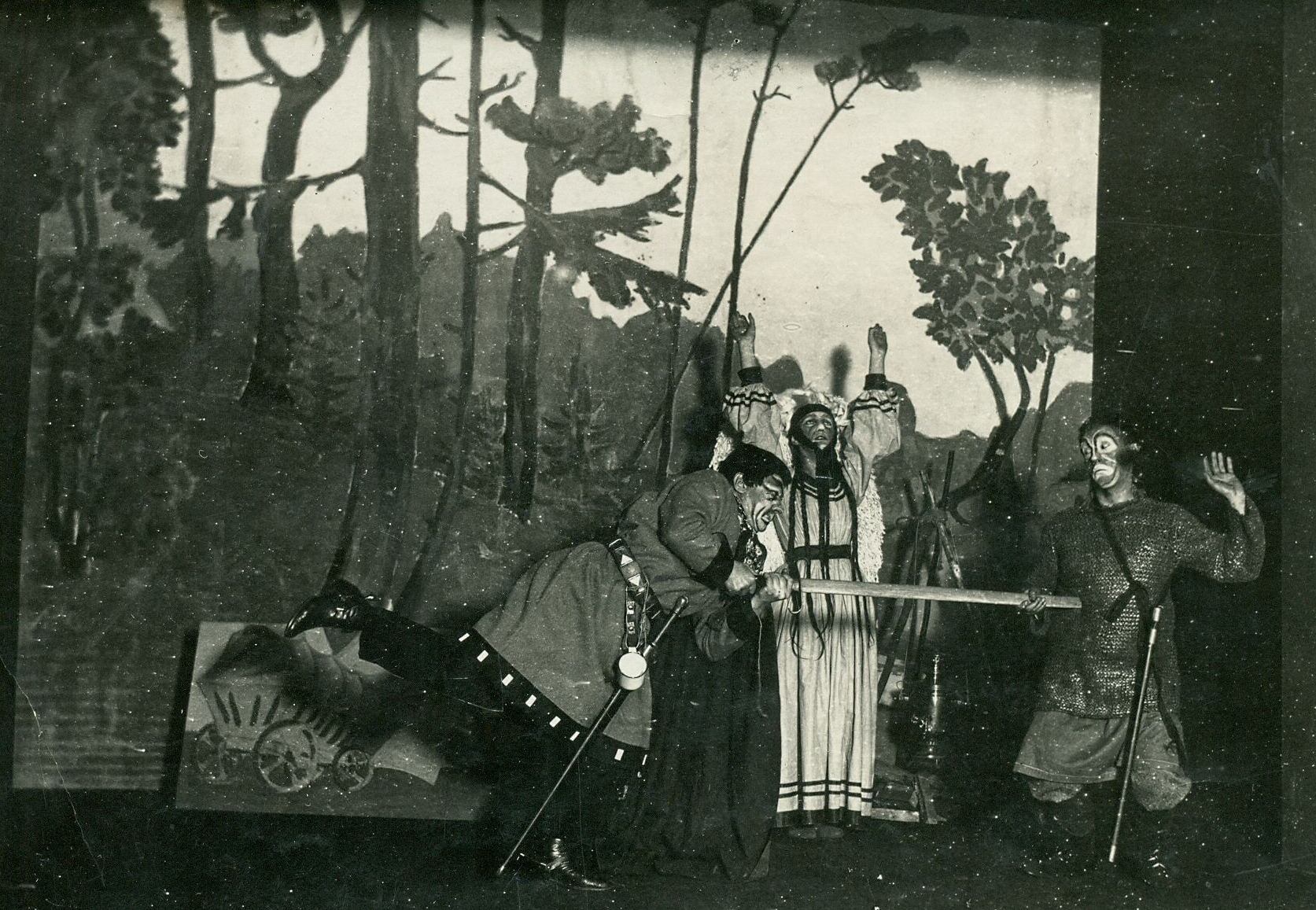
A scene from comedy Devilry by Vytautas Pranas Bičiūnas (1923–1924)

Vilkolakis Theatre (transl. Werewolf Theatre; Lithuanian: Vilkolakio teatras) was a private experimental theater in Kaunas, the temporary capital of Lithuania. Established as an artists' club in 1919, it quickly grew to a cabaret show and a theater under the leadership of the theatre director Antanas Sutkus. The theatre became known for its parodies and satires of current events in Lithuania. The theatre closed in 1925 due to financial difficulties and troubles with the government.

== History ==
=== Artists' club ===
The theatre was founded on 4 May 1919 as a club for artists. The founders included Vytautas Pranas Bičiūnas, Kazys Binkis, Vladas Didžiokas, Olga Dubeneckienė, Vladimiras Dubeneckis, Paulius Galaunė, Adelė Nezabitauskaitė-Galaunienė, Adomas Galdikas, Vilius Jomantas, Petras Kalpokas, Faustas Kirša, Mykolas Leškevičius, Juozas Mikuckis, Kazys Puida, Kajetonas Sklėrius, Balys Sruoga (who was selected as the first director of the club), Antanas Sutkus, Justinas Vienožinskis, Antanas Vienuolis, Antanas Žmuidzinavičius.

The club organized its first event on 9 August 1919 and first theatre performances (directed by Antanas Sutkus) on 18 January 1920. The club held social gatherings and discussions, creative evenings, commemorations of prominent Lithuanian artists, lectures on literature and theatre, short performances. Vilkolakis published two books: almanac Dainava (due to financial difficulties only one issue was published in 1920) and Mano raštai (1922), a collection of satirical poems and parodies by Vytautas Pranas Bičiūnas and Antanas Sutkus.

The Society of Lithuanian Art Creators established in 1920 took over many of the functions of the club. As a result, club's events became more geared towards entertainment than art. This caused dissatisfaction among remaining club members and the club became less active.

=== Theatre ===
In 1920, under the leadership of Antanas Sutkus, Vilkolakis started organizing cabaret evenings. They featured two or three short mostly improvised theatre performances that made fun of current developments in Lithuanian politics, government, culture. Various bureaucrats and government officials were particularly frequent targets of the parodies. Performances also included satirical review of the Lithuanian press. The evenings would end with an orchestra and a 12-member choir performing couplets on similar topics. Performers attempted to elicit audience's participation. The performances or the songs were unrelated to each other in terms of plot and were performed only once.

In November 1921, such evenings grew into an experimental theatre. The performances became more scripted, though there was still room for improvisation. Plays specifically for Vilkolakis were written by Sutkus, Vytautas Pranas Bičiūnas, Antanas Kriščiukaitis, Balys Sruoga, and others. As a result, the plot, characters, genre, and style of the performances became more complete and mature while political and social commentary became sharper and more biting. The performances were no longer based on reactions to the daily news, but on more general observations of politics and society. Thus, the plays could be staged months apart and still be relevant.

A characteristic production of the period was Dolerių kunigaikštis (Duke of Dollars) first staged in October 1921 and reworked as Monkey Business in 1924. It depicts a Lithuanian American who returns to Lithuania to open a business but ends up swindling the investors. The theatre also staged parodies of the classics (e.g. The Government Inspector by Nikolai Gogol, Iliad, The Three Musketeers) adapted to Lithuanian realities. The theatre also reworked some Lithuanian works. For example, Tautinis bizūnas (National Whip) was a reworked version of the Lithuanian comedy America in the Bathhouse. The plays continued to get longer and more complex as the theatre became more experienced. In addition to performing in a rented 238-seat hall on Maironis Street in Kaunas, Vilkolakis frequently toured various Lithuanian cities and incorporated local events into its plays.

The theatre struggled financially. It also ran into troubles with the Lithuanian government after the premiere of Muškietieriai (loosely based on The Three Musketeers) which criticized the War School of Kaunas and military officers. After a single showing, the play was, Sutkus was accused of disrespecting the Lithuanian Army and threatened with internal exile. As a result, the theatre closed in 1925. However, Sutkus and many of the performers were able to transfer to the Kaunas State Theatre.

== Style ==
The theatre incorporated elements of Lithuanian folklore, Italian commedia dell'arte, Russian cabaret (specifically Crooked Mirror Theatre in Saint Petersburg and La Chauve-Souris in Moscow). The performances combined elements of parody, caricature, grotesque, pantomime. However, the humor was rather crude and perhaps better described as buffoonery and farce. The performers wore exaggerated make up, performed comic tricks, and frequently improvised. In addition to entertaining and amusing performances, Vilkolakis prioritized the social and political commentary. According to theatre historian Antanas Vengris, Vilkolakis wanted to "play a fun game and at the same time tell the painful truth".

However, besides general descriptions, Vilkolakis' plays received little attention from theatre historians. Many of the performances were improvised and not recorded making it impossible to recreate them. Of the scripted plays, only two plays were published, several survived in manuscripts, while many others were lost.

== Personnel ==
The plays were directed by Antanas Sutkus. He was assisted by Vytautas Pranas Bičiūnas, Augustinas Gricius, Kazys Juršys. Performers included Nastė Jurašūnaitė-Michailovienė, Potencija Pinkauskaitė, Henrikas Kačinskas, Jadvyga Oškinaitė-Sutkuvienė, Juozas Siparis, Nelė Vosyliūtė, Elena Žalinkevičaitė-Petrauskienė. Musicians included Antanas Dvarionas and Balys Dvarionas. The theatre was supported by priest Juozas Tumas-Vaižgantas who positively reviewed its plays in the press. For this, Tumas faced criticism from his superiors.
