= Vytautas Pranas Bičiūnas =

Lithuanian painter, theatre actor, writer and literary critic

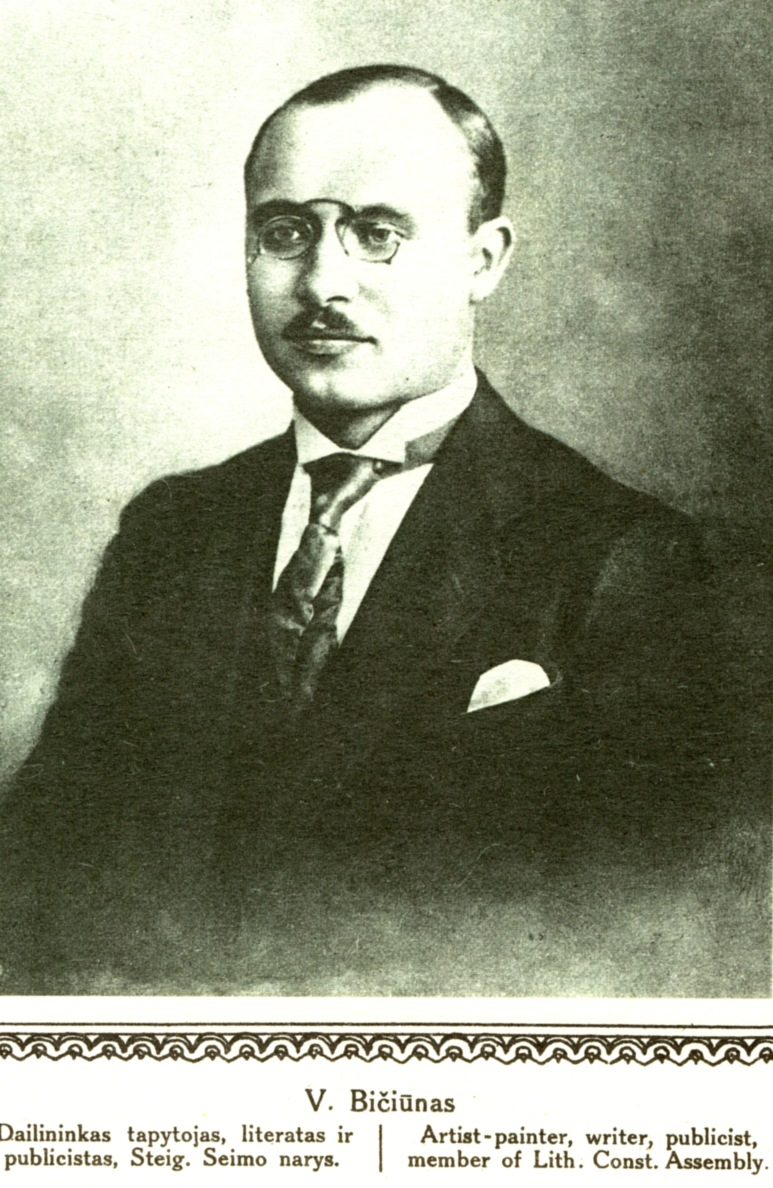
- Born: 20 August 1893; Klovainiai, Russian Empire
- Died: 4 November 1942 (aged 49); Sverdlovsk, Soviet Union
- Cause of death: Executed by the NKVD
- Education: Kazan Art School
- Occupations: Artist, teacher, politician
- Political party: Lithuanian Christian Democratic Party

Vytautas Pranas Bičiūnas (20 August 1893 – 4 November 1942) was a Lithuanian artist, theatre actor, writer and art critic. As a member of the Lithuanian Christian Democratic Party, he was elected to the Constituent Assembly of Lithuania and the First Seimas.

As a gymnasium student in Šiauliai, Bičiūnas joined Varpas Society which organized Lithuanian cultural events and theater performances. He then chose to study at the Kazan Art School. He returned to Lithuania in May 1918 and worked for the Lithuanian government. He joined the Lithuanian Christian Democratic Party and helped organizing the Lithuanian Labour Federation. He was an active member of the Constituent Assembly and the First Seimas, speaking frequently on issues of the Lithuanian Land Reform of 1922 and other legislation. He was not reelected to the Second Seimas and withdrew from the party in 1926.

Bičiūnas worked as a drawing teacher at various schools in Kaunas. At the same time, he was active in public life. In 1922, he became secretary of the Gallery of Mikalojus Konstantinas Čiurlionis (predecessor of the M. K. Čiurlionis National Art Museum). In 1920–1923, he was actor, playwright, scenographer for the satirical Vilkolakis Theatre. He later founded and led two short-lived theatre troupes. He created graphic art (illustrations, posters, advertising) and tried to make it commercially viable.

After the Soviet occupation of Lithuania in June 1940, he was deported during the June deportation and imprisoned at Sevurallag. Accused of organizing a mutiny inside the gulag, Bičiūnas was executed by the NKVD in 1942.

== Biography ==
=== Early life and education ===
Bičiūnas was born in Klovainiai to a family of Polish-speaking farmers and workers on 20 August 1893. In 1903, he enrolled at the Šiauliai Gymnasium where he was a classmate with the future poet Zigmas Gaidamavičius-Gėlė. Bičiūnas became acquainted with Jonas Misius-Misevičius, Gabrielius Landsbergis-Žemkalnis, and other members of Varpas Society which organized Lithuanian cultural events and theater performances in Šiauliai. Under their influence, Bičiūnas joined the Lithuanian National Revival and began artistic endeavors. He painted theater decorations, wrote first theater plays and poems, and published his first article in the Lithuanian press in 1912.

He graduated from the gymnasium in 1912 and chose to study painting and architecture at the Kazan Art School. Despite the distance, he continued to be involved in Lithuanian cultural life. He published his first art in the Lithuanian literary journal Vaivorykštė and newspaper Vairas. He also illustrated poetry collection Tėvynės ašaros of Motiejus Gustaitis and started writing art criticism (first unpublished texts were about Mikalojus Konstantinas Čiurlionis).

In late 1917, Bičiūnas was drafted to the Imperial Russian Army but quickly left it to work at the short-lived Supreme Lithuanian Council in Russia.

=== Independent Lithuania ===
==== Government service ====
Bičiūnas returned to Lithuania in May 1918. He briefly worked as a teacher of drawing at Šiauliai Gymnasium before relocating to Vilnius and Kaunas to work for the Lithuanian government. He was director of the applied art section of the Art Department, director of the propaganda department of the Ministry of Defense, director of religion department of the Ministry of Internal Affairs, auditor for the State Control Institution.

In 1919, Bičiūnas joined the Lithuanian Christian Democratic Party and was later elected to its central committee. He also helped organizing the Lithuanian Labour Federation. In April 1920 election, he was elected to the Constituent Assembly of Lithuania. At the assembly, he was a member of several parliamentary committees. He chaired the committee on national reconstruction after the war. As a member of the committee on land reform, he frequently spoke on the issues and proposals concerning the Lithuanian Land Reform of 1922. In October 1920, he introduced law limiting the length of a workday. In January 1921, when discussing the establishment of a technical school in Kaunas (present-day Kaunas University of Applied Engineering Sciences), he proposed to make it more generalist than just a school of communication technology and suggested opening construction and chemistry departments. These proposals were adopted. Overall, Bičiūnas was an active member of the assembly. He spoke more than 60 times during the proceedings, introduced almost 30 amendments, and questioned government officials.

In October 1922, Bičiūnas was reelected to the First Seimas. He was a member of the parliamentary committees on land and forests as well as finance and budget. He actively worked on several finance related laws, including on pay for workers and members of the parliament, government stipends for singers, etc. The Seimas was deadlocked and could not form a stable government and new elections were called in March 1923. Bičiūnas ran in the elections to the Second Seimas but was not elected.

Bičiūnas left the Christian Democratic Party in 1926. In 1929, he joined the Lithuanian Riflemen's Union. In 1935–1936, he was a board member of the 1st Riflemen Regiment.

==== Teaching, theatre, art ====
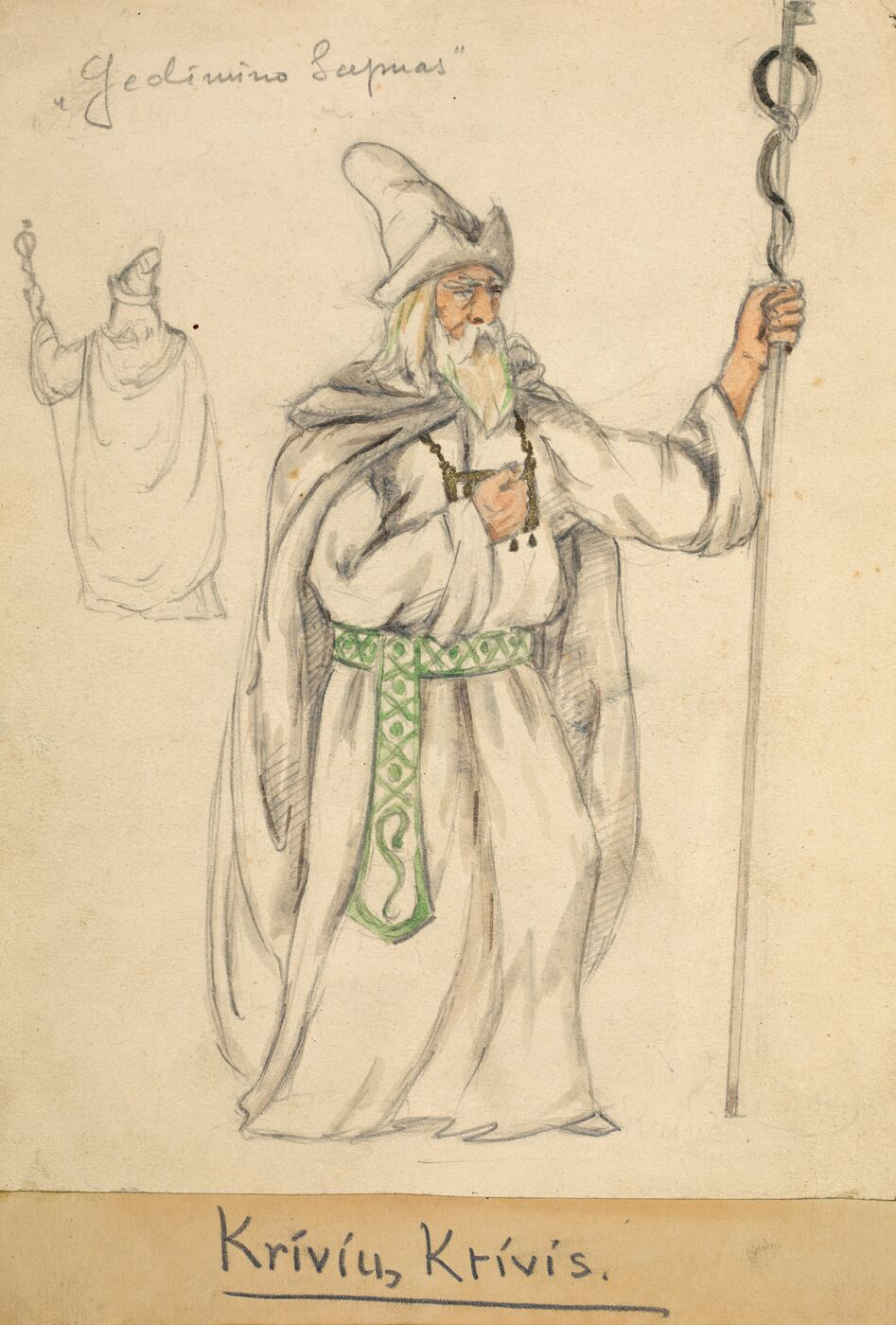
Sketch by Bičiūnas for a costume for Kriwe for a historical play Dream of Gediminas (1923)

From 1923 to 1940, Bičiūnas worked as an art teacher at various schools in Kaunas, including several gymnasiums, Simonas Daukantas Teachers' Seminary, and Kaunas Art School. Bičiūnas wanted to find a way to make a living from art. Therefore, together with Vilius Jomantas and Juozas Levinsonas-Benari, he established a commercial art workshop named after St. Luke that offered commissioned art (paintings, posters, illustrations) for churches, theatres, home décor, etc. It was not were successful and closed down, but was reopened in 1928 when new artists, including Adolfas Valeška, Viktoras Vizgirda, Juozas Mikėnas, joined the workshop. Bičiūnas was also a member of cooperative Gairės established by Kazys Puida. In 1923–1924, the cooperative published art magazine Gairės that was known for its graphic quality.

In 1920, Bičiūnas joined the Society of Lithuanian Art Creators and showcased his graphic art at its art exhibitions in Kaunas and Klaipėda. In 1922, he became secretary of the Gallery of Mikalojus Konstantinas Čiurlionis (predecessor of the M. K. Čiurlionis National Art Museum). In 1927, he led gallery's first expedition to collect examples of Lithuanian folk art from villages. In 1930s, he delivered lectures on modernist and avant-garde art movements on Kaunas Radiophone.

Bičiūnas was a theatre activist. In 1920–1923, he was actor, playwright, scenographer for the satirical Vilkolakis Theatre. He wrote a few plays specifically for this theatre, including Varnalėšos, Chlestakovas Lietuvoje, Velniava. He also worked with the more traditional Nation's Theatre (Tautos teatras). He later founded and led the short-lived theatre troupes Vytis (1927–1928) and Žvaigždikis (1931–1932). These troupes performed various plays, but mainly those written by Bičiūnas.

=== Soviet persecution ===
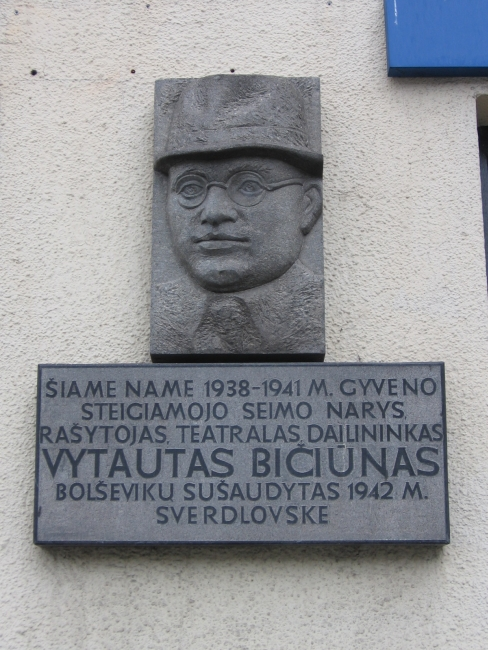
Bičiūnas' memorial plaque in Kaunas

After the Soviet occupation of Lithuania in June 1940, he was dismissed from his teaching position. He was arrested and deported during the June deportation in 1941. He was formally accused of criticizing Soviet-style decorations for a school event.

He was imprisoned at Sevurallag. NKVD accused 15 Lithuanians (including Bičiūnas, Juozas Papečkys, Voldemaras Vytautas Čarneckis) of organizing a "counter-revolutionary" group that prepared for an armed mutiny inside the gulag. Bičiūnas was sentenced to death by the Special Council of the NKVD on 17 October 1942. Bičiūnas was executed by shooting on 30 October or 4 November together with the other accused Lithuanians. They were shot in an NKVD prison in Sverdlovsk (now Yekaterinburg) and were likely buried in a mass grave at the 12 kilometre marker on the highway to Moscow. In 1990s, Memorial to the Victims of Political Repression was built at the site with more than 18,000 names of the people buried there.

Bičiūnas wife Natalija Namikaitė with two sons and daughter Jūratė were also arrested during the June deportation. They were deported to the shores of the Laptev Sea. The youngest son drowned in the sea. The other family members survived and were able to return to Lithuania in 1956. Jūratė Bičiūnaitė-Masiulienė published her memoirs about the deportation in 1990.

== Works ==
=== Publications ===
Starting in 1911, Bičiūnas contributed articles and art to various Lithuanian periodicals, including Aušrinė, Vaivorykštė, Vairas, Nepriklausomoji Lietuva, Tiesos kardas, Draugija, Lietuvos aidas, Ateitis, Pavasaris. In 1917, he was secretary of Lietuvių balsas published by the Lithuanian Society for the Relief of War Sufferers. Later he was a secretary of the official government daily Lietuva. In 1920, he was the editor and publisher of the daily Laisvė. Most valued articles by Bičiūnas concerned theatre and included critical reviews of theatre productions.

Bičiūnas published several books. He wrote poetry, short stories, plays. Many of his plays were not published and were lost. A collection of his stories was published in 1928 and a play about the Battle of Žalgiris was published in 1932. He published two books on art criticism – about Mikalojus Konstantinas Čiurlionis in 1927 and Vincas Krėvė in 1930. He published two textbooks on drawing and penmanship as well as an advice book for amateur theater activists. Additionally, he published a history of Kaunas (1930), a work on the Vilnius conflict (1931), and a biography of priest Jonas Katelė (1934). The history of Kaunas was published for the city's 900th anniversary from its legendary founding in 1030 and remained the only book on the city's history until a 2010 study by the historian Zigmantas Kiaupa.

=== Art ===
Bičiūnas mainly created graphic arts, but most of his art was lost during World War II. Therefore, most of his works are known from published illustrations and advertising.

His first art reflected realism and symbolism which were prevalent among Lithuanian artists at the time, but he quickly became interested in futurism via the Russian artist group Hylaea. Bičiūnas experimented with avant garde art movements, but around 1924 his art turned to the more traditional realism. This shift was caused by the more conservative tastes of his clients as he turned more to commissioned art. This was accompanied by his articles in the press where he criticized modernist art as too individualistic and argued that art should reflect the national character and draw inspiration from folk art.

== Bibliography ==
- Bičiūnaitė-Masiulienė, Jūratė (1990). Jaunystė prie Laptevų jūros (in Lithuanian). Vilnius: Mintis. ISBN 541702869X.
- Blažytė-Baužienė, Danutė (2006). "Bičiūnas Vytautas". In Ragauskas, Aivas; Tamošaitis, Mindaugas (eds.). Lietuvos Steigiamojo Seimo (1920–1922 metų) narių biografinis žodynas. Didysis Lietuvos parlamentarų biografinis žodynas (in Lithuanian). Vol. 2. Vilnius: Vilniaus pedagoginis universitetas. pp. 84–88. ISBN 9789955201465.
- Blažytė-Baužienė, Danutė (2007). "Bičiūnas Vytautas". In Ragauskas, Aivas; Tamošaitis, Mindaugas (eds.). Lietuvos Respublikos Seimų I (1922–1923), II (1923–1926), III (1926–1927), IV (1936–1940) narių biografinis žodynas. Didysis Lietuvos parlamentarų biografinis žodynas (in Lithuanian). Vol. 3. Vilniaus pedagoginis universitetas. pp. 208–210. ISBN 978-9955-20-345-2.
- Intaitė, Živilė (2014). "Tarp tradicijų ir modernumo: Vytauto Bičiūno (1893–1942) kūryba". Krantai (in Lithuanian). 4: 12–15. ISSN 0235-6384.
- Lopienė, Regina (18 January 2024) [2018]. "Vytautas Bičiūnas". Visuotinė lietuvių enciklopedija (in Lithuanian). Mokslo ir enciklopedijų leidybos centras.
- Macijauskienė, Marija (15 November 2013). "Laiko upės". XXI amžius (in Lithuanian). 41 (2065). ISSN 2029-1299.
- Žygelis, Dalius; Tekorius, Andrius (2014). "Plk. ltn. Juozas Papečkys: Lietuvos karo teisės patriarchas" (PDF). Kardas (in Lithuanian). 2 (462): 2–9. ISSN 1392-9437.
- Varkalaitė, Rūta (27 October 2012). "Vytautą Bičiūną prisimenant". Voruta (in Lithuanian). 22 (760): 14.
- Vasinauskaitė, Rasa (2017). "Lietuvių teatras ir spauda 1920-1929 metais: kritikos (savi)legitimacija". Menotyra (in Lithuanian). 2 (24): 79–96. ISSN 1392-1002.
