= Dvarionas =

- Lithuanian surname
- m.: Dvarionas
- f.: (unmarried): Dvarionaitė
- f.: (married): Dvarionienė

Dvarionas is a Lithuanian surname. Notable people with the surname include:

- Balys Dvarionas (1904–1972), Lithuanian pedagogue, composer, pianist, choirmaster
- Justas Dvarionas (born 1967), Lithuanian pianist and public figure
- Margarita Dvarionaitė (1928–2008), Lithuanian musician, the first conductor of a Lithuanian symphony orchestra
