= Borisas Dauguvietis =

Lithuanian writer

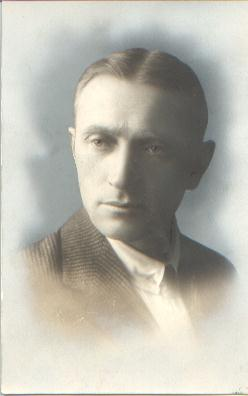
- Born: 26 March 1885; Dauguviečiai, Russian Empire
- Died: 13 July 1949 (aged 64); Vilnius, Soviet Union
- Resting place: Rasos Cemetery
- Education: Imperial Theatrical School
- Occupations: Actor; playwright; writer; poet; theater director

Borisas Dauguvietis (26 March 1885 – 13 July 1949) was a Lithuanian actor, playwright, writer, poet, and theater director. He is the brother of pianist Lidija Dauguvietytė, and father of actresses Galina Dauguvietytė, Elena Dauguvietytė-Kudabienė, and Ksana Dauguvietytė-Šniukštienė. The Borisas Dauguvietis Earring Award is named after him, and is given to people who significantly contribute to Lithuanian theater.

== Biography ==
=== Early life ===
Borisas Dauguvietis was born on 26 March 1885 in the Dauguviečiai village of the Russian Empire. According to Dauguvietis, his ancestors were Don Cossacks. He attended school in Panevėžys, in which he participated in an anti-Tsarist strike in 1905, and Jelgava. After briefly studying engineering in Riga, Dauguvietis enrolled in the Imperial Theatrical School in St. Petersburg, which he graduated from in 1909. From 1909 to 1913 he acted at the St. Petersburg Literary and Artistic Society Theatre. From 1914 to 1920 he continued his acting career in Nizhny Novgorod and Penza, and also headed an enterprise in Grodno.

=== Director in Lithuania ===
In 1920 he returned to Lithuania in Rigmantiškiai to work as a forester. Here he encountered the Biržai Music and Drama Society Mūza, and shortly became its director. Dauguvietis gained notoriety after directing Molière's play Le Médecin malgré lui. In 1922 Dauguvietis began talks with Liudas Gira, then the director of the National Kaunas Drama Theatre. In 1923 he was invited to direct for the theater. He also lectured at the Kaunas Theater School, which he founded in 1924 along with Konstantinas Glinskis. From 1924 to 1940 Dauguvietis produced and directed various plays in the theater, especially those of Petras Vaičiūnas. He also worked with authors such as Kazys Binkis, Augustinas Gricius, and Vincas Mykolaitis-Putinas. In 1929 he wrote a travel book Teatrališkoji Maskva (Theatrical Moscow). From 1931 to 1935 Dauguvietis also directed plays at the Šiauliai Drama Theater. In 1931 Dauguvietis was awarded the Order of Gediminas, 3rd degree. The following year he was awarded the Order of the Three Stars, 3rd degree. In 1938 he was awarded the Order of Vytautas the Great, 3rd degree.

Dauguvietis also produced Russian and other foreign classic plays. Under Dauguvietis's initiative, the weekly newspaper 7 meno dienos was established. Dauguvietis's performances were characterized by expressive theatricality, emotion, and comedic interludes. Dauguvietis's students included the actors Elena Bindokaitė, Emilija Grikevičiūtė, Galina Jackevičiūtė, Kazys Jarašūnas, Aleksandras Kernagis, Bronė Kurmytė, Vanda Lietuvaitytė, Balys Lukošius, Antanas Mackevičius, Juozas Monkevičius, Stasys Petraitis, Emilija Platušaitė, Alfonsas Radzevičius, Juozas Rudzinskas, and Liucija Rutkauskaitė. Dauguvietis reportedly liked classical music, could play the cello and the piano, and knew many of Alexander Pushkin's, Mikhail Lermontov's, and Sergei Yesenin's poems. Dauguvietis also composed poems himself. He enjoyed frequently retreating to his home village of Dauguviečiai rather than the classical resort of Palanga.

=== Later years ===
During Nazi Germany's war with the Soviet Union from 1941 to 1944, Dauguvietis lived in the Joniškis District. After the war, Dauguvietis himself wrote several plays: Nauja vaga (1945), Uždavinys (1946), and Žaldokynė (1947). From 1947 Dauguvietis was the manager of art and director at the Lithuanian National Drama Theater. Additionally, he was a deputy of the Supreme Council of the USSR and chairman of the Playwrights Section of the Theater Society and the Writers' Union.

Borisas Dauguvietis died on 13 July 1949 in Vilnius. He was buried in the Rasos Cemetery.

== Remembrance ==
Sculptor Rapolas Jakimavičius created a bust of Dauguvietis which stands in the foyer of the Lithuanian National Drama Theater. The surname of Dauguvietis is engraved in the "Tree of Unity" sculpture in Vilnius, which contains one hundred of the most prominent Lithuanian personalities of all time. There is also a street named after him in Vilnius.
