= Kuršėnai =

- City
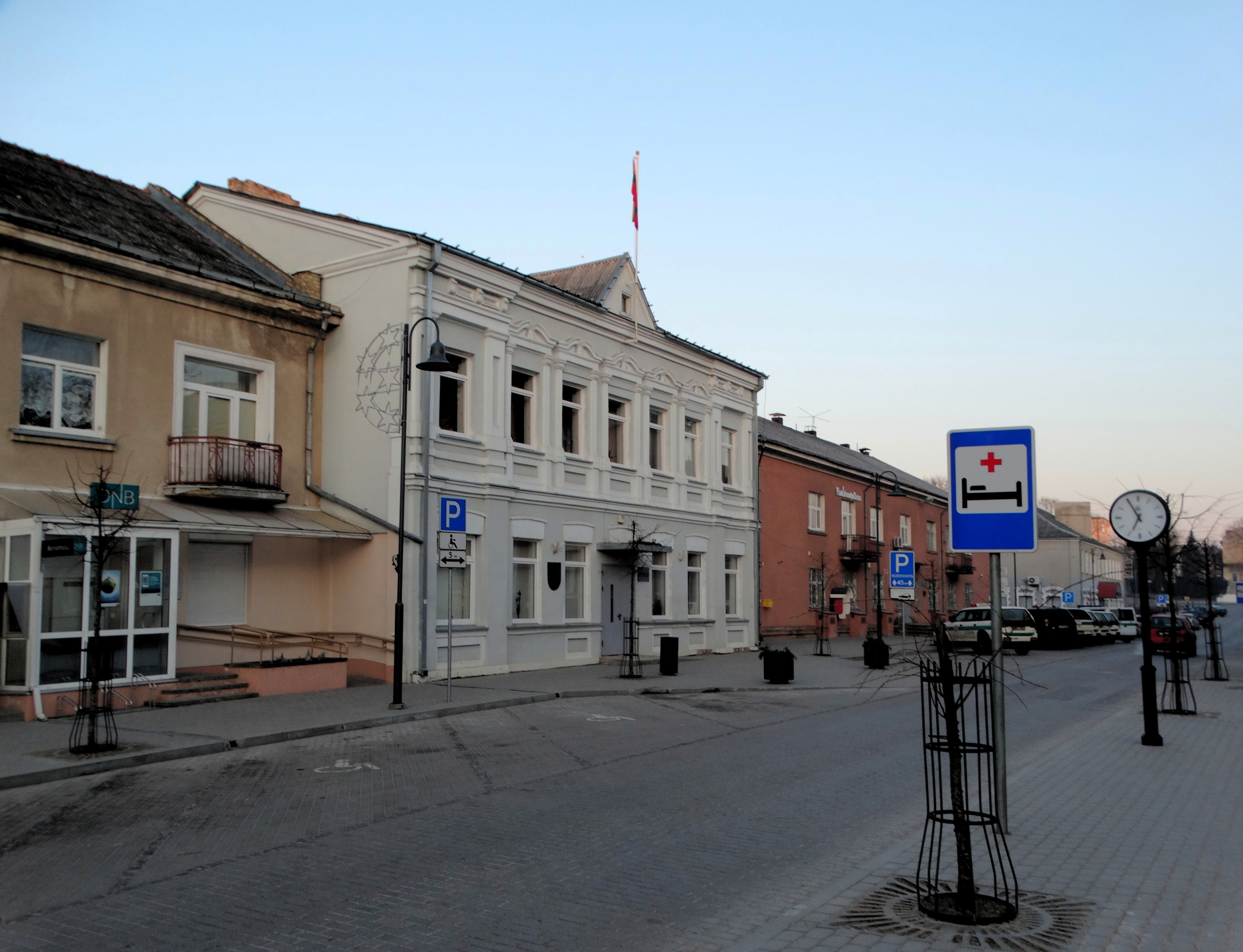
- Kuršėnai eldership building (white) in J. Basanavičius st.

- Flag Coat of arms

- Location of Kuršėnai
- Coordinates: 55°59′N 22°55′E
- Country: Lithuania
- County: Šiauliai County
- Municipality: Šiauliai district municipality
- Eldership: Kuršėnai urban eldership
- Seat of: Kuršėnai urban eldership Kuršėnai rural eldership
- First mentioned: 12th century
- Granted city rights: 1947

Population (2023)
  - Total: 10,651
- Time zone: UTC+2 (EET)
  - Summer (DST): UTC+3 (EEST)

Kuršėnai (Samogitian: Koršienā) is a city in northwestern Lithuania, Šiauliai County, Šiauliai district municipality. It is the twenty-fifth largest city in Lithuania. According to the 2023 estimate, it had 10,651 residents.

== Etymology ==
The city's name was first documented in the 16th century. According to historian Mykolas Balinskis, its name is derived from the word kuršis (Curonian). However, according to folk legend, the city didn't have a name for a long time. But, one summer day the river Venta flooded and washed all hay bales which were standing at the river banks. People started questioning each other: where is the hay? where is the hay? („Kur šienai? Kur šienai?“). Since then, the city name stayed as Kuršėnai. In other languages the town is referred to as: Yiddish: קורשאַן Kurshon; German: Kurschenen; Polish: Kurszany; Latvian: Kuršēni.

== History ==
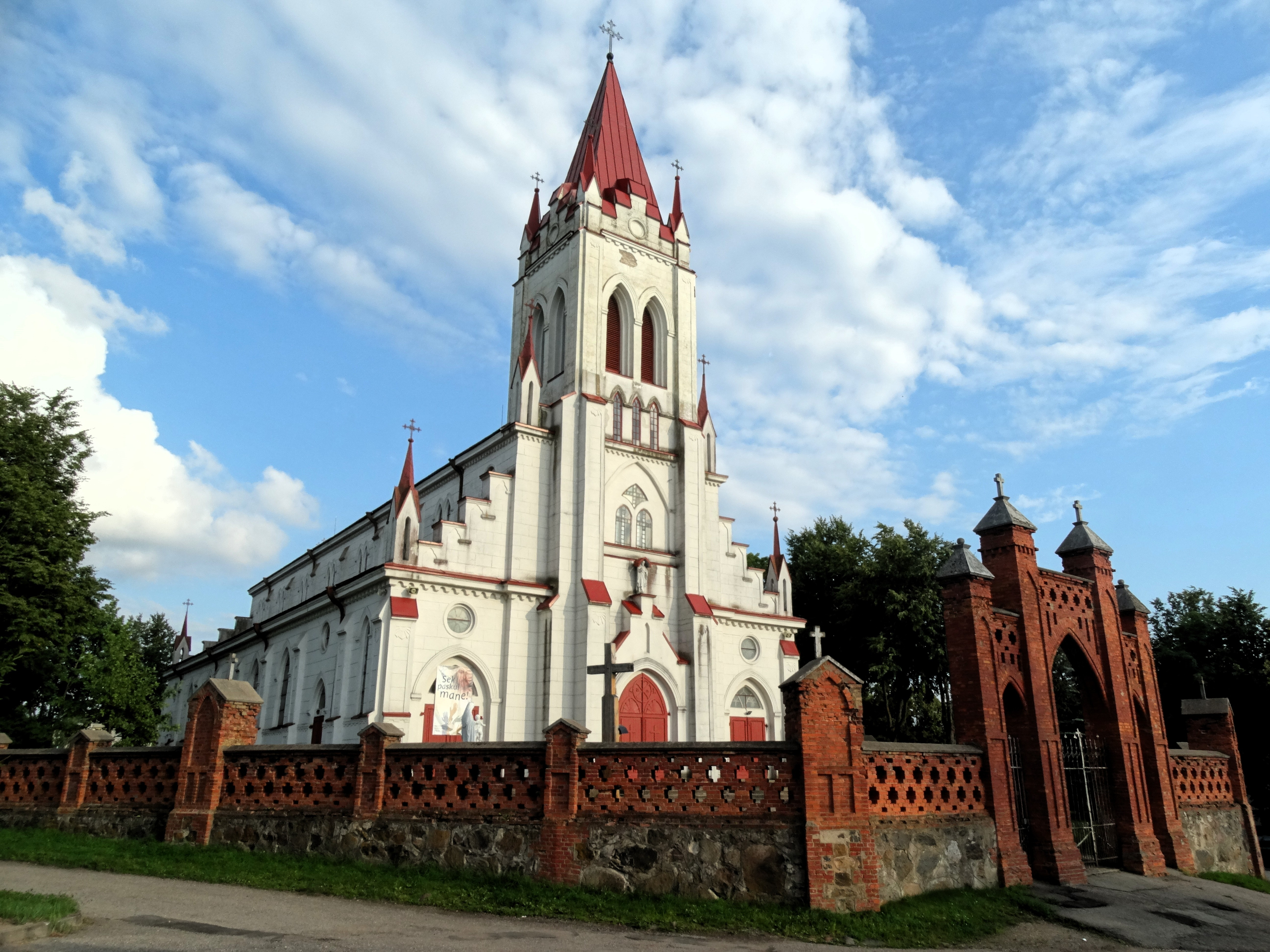
Catholic Church in Kuršėnai

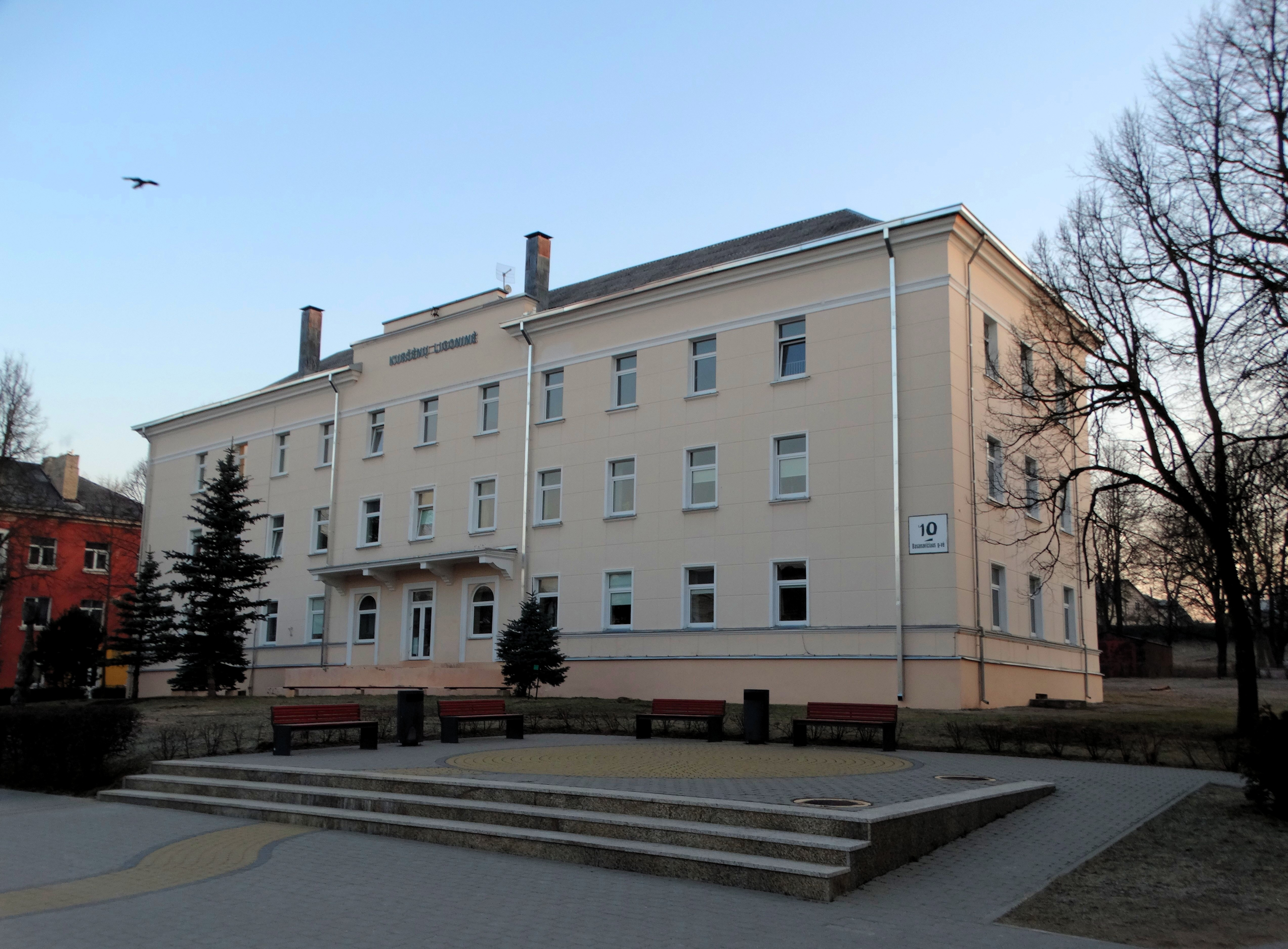
Hospital

=== Early history ===
The town and its surroundings fall within the boundaries of the territory inhabited by the ancient Samogitian tribe. According to historian S. Zajančiovskis, Kuršėnai was first mentioned in the 12th century. Since the 14th century, Kuršėnai village and Kuršėnai Manor was the personal property of the Lithuanian Grand Duke. A wooden church was built in 1523. From 1561-1563 Kuršėnai was already referred to as a town. In 1564, King and Grand Duke Sigismund II Augustus gave Kuršėnai with 162 valakas of land, on the advice of the Samogitian Elder Jonas Chodkevičius, to the Despot-Zenavičiai family. Kuršenai was later the property of Pac family and after them a property of Gruževskiai family, who ruled the town with the manor until World War II.

Under George Despot-Zenevičius, the Castellan of Polotsk, the town began to expand in the manor lands on the other side of the Venta River. In 1621, the estate was acquired by Steponas Pacas, the Grand Treasurer of the Grand Duchy of Lithuania and Great Scribe of Lithuania. In 1631, by a decree of the King Sigismund III Vasa, the manor of Kuršėnai was given to George Gruževskis (1591-1651) as a perpetual right for his merits in the Livonian War.

=== 18th-early 20th century ===
At the end of the 18th century, Kuršėnai were inherited by Stephen Gruzewski. Having brought in the artist J. Rilke with the apprentice team, he built a new (current) manor house and a chapel and renovated other buildings in 1811. The estate flourished still further under the rule of his younger son Edward who took it over in 1846.

Kuršėnai Manor has the most valuable heritage of wooden manorial architecture in Šiauliai District. The original staircase, window frames, and wooden front doors have survived.

After the Third Partition of Polish-Lithuanian Commonwealth the estate of Kuršėnai was under Russian rule from 1795 to 1914, first in the Vilna Governorate and from 1843 in the Kovno Governorate. The town itself began to flourish after 1873 when a railway station of Libau–Romny Railway was built here. During the years of Lithuanian press ban, the banned press was spread by A. Kairys, P. Milašauskas, S. Rupšys and other book smugglers. In 1899, a secret Lithuanian language school by Eleonora Karaveckaitė was opened. During Russian Revolution of 1905 strikes and demonstrations took place in Kuršėnai and the local Russian administration was expelled.

During World War I the manor and the park were severely damaged by the occupying German army who stole the manor's valuables. In 1914 the town's Jewish population was expelled by the Russian army, who accused them of collaborating with the Germans. The fire of 1915 destroyed the peasant farms, barns, and sheds. The manor belonged to George Gruzewski at that time. Owing to advanced farming, the estate was flourishing during the interwar period. The manor was nationalized in 1940.

=== World War II and later ===
In 1939 there were around 900 Jews living in the town (out of the total population of around 3000). Their persecution began in July, 1941. Immediately following the arrival of the Nazis a Lithuanian squad was formed in Kuršėnai. They arrested supporters of the Soviet regime and assigned the Jews to various forced labor tasks. When a ghetto was set up in Kuršėnai by an order of Nazi authorities many Jews were housed in the two synagogues. At the end of July Nazis and a group of Lithuanian nationalists (white armbanders) together with police seized approximately 150 to 168 Jewish men and murdered them in a mass execution in a nearby forest, about three kilometers from the city.

After World War II, during the Soviet occupation, Lithuanian partisans of the Kęstutis military district, later the Voverė and Kunigaikštis Žvelgaitis detachments of Prisikėlimas military district, were active in the area.

The town was home to the Pavenčiai Sugar Factory, the Daugėliai Building Materials Company, and the Jiesia ceramics factory. Currently Agrokoncerno grupė agricultural company established a Grain Processing Plant in the territory of the former sugar factory.

24 October 1994. The coat of arms of Kuršėnai was adopted by the Decree of the President of Lithuania. In 2014, the settlement of Ringuvėnai was incorporated into the town.

== Economy ==
Since clay deposits that were ideal for making fine ceramics were discovered near Kuršėnai, pottery has long been thriving in the city. In the last century, Kuršėnai became famous for fairs abundant in earthenware. Kuršėnai is called the “Capital of Potters” not only due to the abundance of such handicraftsmen in the city but also because the All-Time Potter's Crown has been solely won by the folk artists from Kuršėnai such as J. Paulauskas, V. Damkus, B. Radeckas, and J. Vertelis. It clearly is no coincidence that a pitcher is one of the elements of the coat of arms of the city.

== Famous dishes ==
Kuršėnų vyniotinis, a type of sweet rolled pastry with cheese curd filling, was named after the city. The dessert was created by Eugenija Dragūnienė, a gulag survivor who opened a local confectionery store after her release.

== Famous people ==
- Stasys Raštikis, Lithuanian army general
- Donald Kagan, Yale Classics professor
- Vacys Reimeris, poet
- Stasys Lipskis
- Arieh Kubovy, chairman of Yad Vashem
- Kazimiera Kymantaitė (1909-1999), Lithuanian film and actress and stage director
