= List of ambassadors of Lithuania to China =

Coordinates: 39.961741°N 116.469441°E

Ambassador of Lithuania to the People's Republic of China
- Incumbent; Diana Mickevičienė since 2020
- Inaugural holder: Ginutis Voveris
- Formation: 1995

The Lithuanian ambassador in Beijing is the official representative of the Government in Vilnius to the Government of the People's Republic of China.

== List of representatives ==
Diplomatic agrément/Diplomatic accreditation	ambassador	Observations	Prime Minister of Lithuania	Premier of the People's Republic of China	Term end
1995	Ginutis Voveris	Charge d'affaires in 1997 he was designated and accredited as ambassador	Adolfas Šleževičius	Li Peng	2001
2001	Artūras Žurauskas		Rolandas Paksas	Zhu Rongji	2006
2007	Rokas Bernotas		Gediminas Kirkilas	Wen Jiabao	2010
2010	Lina Antanavičienė		Andrius Kubilius	Wen Jiabao	2015
2015	Ina Marčiulionytė		Algirdas Butkevičius	Li Keqiang	2020
2020	Diana Mickevičienė	Withdrawn for consultations in September 2021; the PRC demoted relations with Lithuania to the level of charge d'affaires in November 2021	Saulius Skvernelis	Li Keqiang	2021

- China–Lithuania relations
