= Dalia (Dvarionas opera) =

Lithuanian opera by Balys Dvarionas

Dalia is a Lithuanian-language opera in four acts by Balys Dvarionas to a libretto by lt:Jonas Mackonis, after the 1938 play by Balys Sruoga "Apyaušrio dalia".

== Excerpts ==
- Dalia's aria from Act 1 - performed by Violeta Urmana
- Skudutis' ballad
- Duet of Jurgelis and Dalia
