= Antanina Vainiūnaitė-Kubertavičienė =

Lithuanian actress

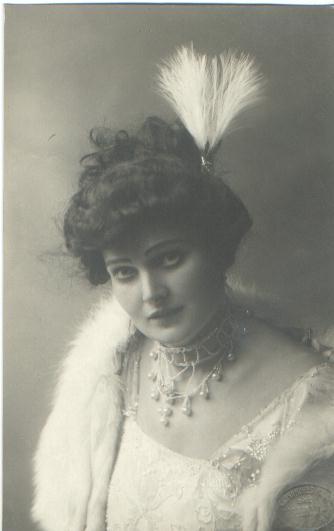
- Born: Antanina Vainiūnaitė; 14 May 1896; Odesa, Russian Empire (now Ukraine)
- Died: 3 March 1973 (aged 76); Kaunas, Lithuanian SSR (now Lithuania)
- Burial place: Petrašiūnai Cemetery, Kaunas
- Occupation: Stage actress
- Years active: 1920–1970
- Spouse: Petras Kubertavičius

Antanina Vainiūnaitė-Kubertavičienė (14 May 1896 – 3 March 1973) was a Lithuanian stage actress. She was recognized as a People's Artist of the Lithuanian SSR in 1956.

== Biography ==
Antanina Vainiūnaitė was born on 14 May 1896 in Odesa in present-day Ukraine. In 1918 she graduated from Pavel Mochalov's Russian Theater School in Odesa. In 1918, Vainiūnaitė joined the theater of Juozas Vaičkus in Vilnius. After the capture of Vilnius by Poland in 1919, she moved with the troupe to Kaunas on foot. From 1920, Vainiūnaitė performed at the Kaunas Drama Theater of the Art Creators Society (it was reorganized into the State Theater in 1922).

From 1919 to 1973, Vainiūnaitė lived in Kaunas. During the 50 years spent in the theater, Vainiūnaitė played more than 200 roles. She played Lady Milford in Friedrich Schiller's drama Intrigue and Love for 30 years. The scenic images created by Vainiūnaitė are distinguished by careful finishing of details, sincerity, warmth, and life authenticity. In 1964, Vainiūnaitė starred in the film March! March! Tra-ta-ta! (Marš, marš, tra-ta-ta!) produced by the Lithuanian Film Studios.

In 1956, Vainiūnaitė was awarded the honorary title of People's Artist of the Lithuanian SSR.

Vainiūnaitė was married to the Lithuanian actor Petras Kubertavičius (1897–1964).

Vainiūnaitė died on 3 March 1973 in Kaunas. She was buried in the Petrašiūnai Cemetery in Kaunas. In 1987, a memorial plaque was installed on the house in Kaunas where Vainiūnaitė lived.

== Selected stage roles ==
- Maptsele (Hungry People by Konstantinas Jasiukaitis, 1919)
- Raudonauskienė (Money by Sofija Čiurlionenė, 1921)
- Louise, Lady Milford (Intrigue and Love by Friedrich Schiller, 1922)
- Desdemona (Othello by William Shakespeare, 1924)
- Countess, Marcellina (The Marriage of Figaro by Pierre Beaumarchais, 1924, 1952)
- Princess Turandot (Turandot by Giacomo Puccini, 1927)
- Elisabeth of Valois (Don Carlos by Friedrich Schiller, 1931)
- Lady Macbeth (Macbeth by William Shakespeare, 1939)
- Ninene (The Roosters Sing by Juozas Baltušis, 1948)
- Klimanskienė (Hot Summer by Augustinas Gricius, 1955)
- Gornostaev (Spring Love by Konstantin Trenyov, 1956)
- Miss Europe (Dress Rehearsal by Kazys Binkis, 1959)
- Anfisa (Three Sisters by Anton Chekhov, 1960)

== Awards ==
- Order of Vytautas the Great 4th class (1931)
- Order of the Lithuanian Grand Duke Gediminas 3rd class (1935)
- Order of the Badge of Honour (1954)
- People's Artist of the Lithuanian SSR (1956)
