= Lina Antanavičienė =

Lithuanian diplomat

Lina Antanavičienė is a Lithuanian diplomat. She has served as Chief Adviser to the President of Lithuania and as Ambassador of Lithuania to China, Israel, Mongolia, South Korea, and Vietnam.

== Biography ==
Antanavičienė studied economics at Vilnius University. After graduating, she began her diplomatic career in 1991.

In 2016, Antanavičienė was Chief Adviser to the President of Lithuania, Dalia Grybauskaitė.

Antanavičienė was Ambassador of Lithuania to China from 2010 until 2015. While resident in Beijing, she also served as Ambassador Extraordinary and Plenipotentiary to Mongolia, South Korea, and Vietnam from 2011 until 2015. She was Ambassador of Lithuania to Israel from August 2019 to September 2023. She was succeeded by Audrius Brūzga.
