= Literatūra ir menas =

Lithuanian magazine

- Editor: Gitis Norvilas
- Frequency: Biweekly
- Circulation: 1,300 per print run
- Publisher: Literatūra ir Menas Public Institution
- Founded: 1946
- Country: Lithuania
- ISSN: 0233-3260

Literatūra ir menas (transl. Literature and Art) is a biweekly magazine of the Lithuanian Writers' Union. It has been published since July 21, 1946 in Vilnius.

== History ==
Literatūra ir menas was first published as a monthly supplement to the newspaper Tarybų Lietuva (Soviet Lithuania). From 1942 to 1944, it was published in Moscow (the first two issues were titled Menas ir literatūra), and from 1944 to 1945, it was published in Kaunas. In July 1946, Literatūra ir menas became an independent publication. From 1946 to 1954, it was published by the Lithuanian Soviet Socialist Republic (LSSR) Soviet Writers' Union and the Board of Artistic Affairs. From 1954 to 1963, it came under the Lithuanian Soviet Writers' Union, from 1936 to 1968, it was under the LSSR Writers' Union, from 1968 to 1982, it was under the LSSR Creative Union, and from 1982 to 1989, it was under the LSSR Ministry of Culture as well as the Writers' Union. After Lithuanian independence in 1990, it came under the Lithuanian Writers' Union. Since 2005, it has been published by the Public Institution of Literatūra ir Menas, founded by the Lithuanian Writers' Union. With funding from the European Union, Literatūra ir menas updated its format and became a magazine.

The magazine includes articles on cultural events, literature, music, visual arts, theater, film, architecture, Lithuanian cultural heritage, as well as original and translated fiction. In July 2016, when the magazine celebrated its 70th anniversary, it has published a total of 3578 issues. The magazine was published weekly, but it become biweekly in 2018 due to reduced funding from the state. 40400 copies were printed per print run in 1981, 76100 in 1989, 1997 in 3300, and 2000 in 2007. Currently, 1300 copies are printed for each print run.

== Editors ==
Magazine's editors were:

- 1946–1949 – Jonas Šimkus
- 1949–1969 – Vacys Reimeris
- 1969–1975 – Vytautas Radaitis
- 1975–1985 – Osvaldas Aleksa
- 1985–1988 – Antanas Drilinga
- 1989–1990 – Leonidas Jacinevičius
- 1990–1993 – Vytautas Rubavičius
- 1993–1995 – Vladas Braziūnas
- 1995–1998 – Alvydas Šlepikas
- 1999–2001 – Gintaras Bleizgys
- 2001–2014 – Kornelijus Platelis
- Since 2014 – Gytis Norvilas
