= Algirdas Budrys =

Lithuanian musician

Professor Algirdas Budrys (born 3 March 1939) is a Lithuanian musician and head of the wind department of the Lithuanian Music Academy.

Primarily a clarinetist, Budrys has recorded more than 50 LPs and has made over a hundred radio recordings with a repertoire that included all the principal classical and chamber ensemble works for clarinet from Mozart to contemporary composers.

Budrys has given concerts in all former Soviet republics, as well as in Hungary, Poland, the Czech Republic, Germany, Finland, France, Egypt, Great Britain and the United States.

For his efforts to improve Lithuanian culture and art, Budrys was awarded a fourth-degree Order of the Lithuanian Grand Duke Gediminas in 1999.
