= Ina Marčiulionytė =

Ina Marčiulionytė (born 1963) is the Ambassador and Permanent Delegate of the Republic of Lithuania to UNESCO at the headquarters in Paris and has served in that post since 2003. Since 2007, she also serves as vice-president of the UNESCO Executive Board. Since September 2015, Marčiulionytė has been Lithuanian Ambassador in Beijing (People's Republic of China).

In 2009, she was jointly nominated by Lithuania, Estonia and Latvia as a candidate to the post of UNESCO Director-General.

== Biography ==
As a former Chair of the World Heritage Committee, she was leading UNESCO's efforts to improve the Organization's most visible area of activity, protection of the World Heritage, by strengthening the safeguarding and monitoring of the sites on the World Heritage list.

In 1999, she was appointed Vice-Minister of the Ministry of Culture of the Republic of Lithuania, a position she held to 2003. As Vice-Minister, Ms. Marčiulionytė participated in organizing the international conference "Dialogue Among Civilizations", supported by UNESCO, and contributed to the preparatory work of UNESCO's 2003 Convention on Intangible Heritage.

Ms. Marčiulionytė graduated from Vilnius University in 1986, with a degree in Lithuanian language and literature. She had worked as a correspondent and editor for various Lithuanian newspapers and magazines. In 1988 she joined Sąjūdis, the Lithuanian Reform Movement that led to regaining the independence of Lithuania in 1990. As a member of Sajūdis, Ms. Marčiulionytė actively sought to revive the use of the Lithuanian language and to protect the cultural heritage suppressed during the Soviet period. Ms. Marčiulionytė was a driving force for freedom and democracy when Lithuania regained its independence.

As a founding member of the Open Society Fund Lithuania in 1991, Ms. Marčiulionytė was in the vanguard of the efforts to foster democracy in the newly independent Lithuania. Under her leadership, the Open Society House, responsible for cultural and educational programs, became a well-established meeting place for intellectuals, educators, journalists and artists from all over Lithuania, as well as their counterparts from Eastern and Central Europe. At the Open Society Fund she worked with George Soros.

She speaks four languages ( English, French, Lithuanian and Russian) and has translated several books and articles published in the national and international specialized press on arts and culture, cultural policy and heritage.

She has been honored with the Cross of Commander of the Order of the Lithuanian Grand Duke Gediminas, the Lithuanian Presidential Award which was honors citizens of Lithuania for outstanding performance in civil and public offices.
