= Klovainiai =

- Town
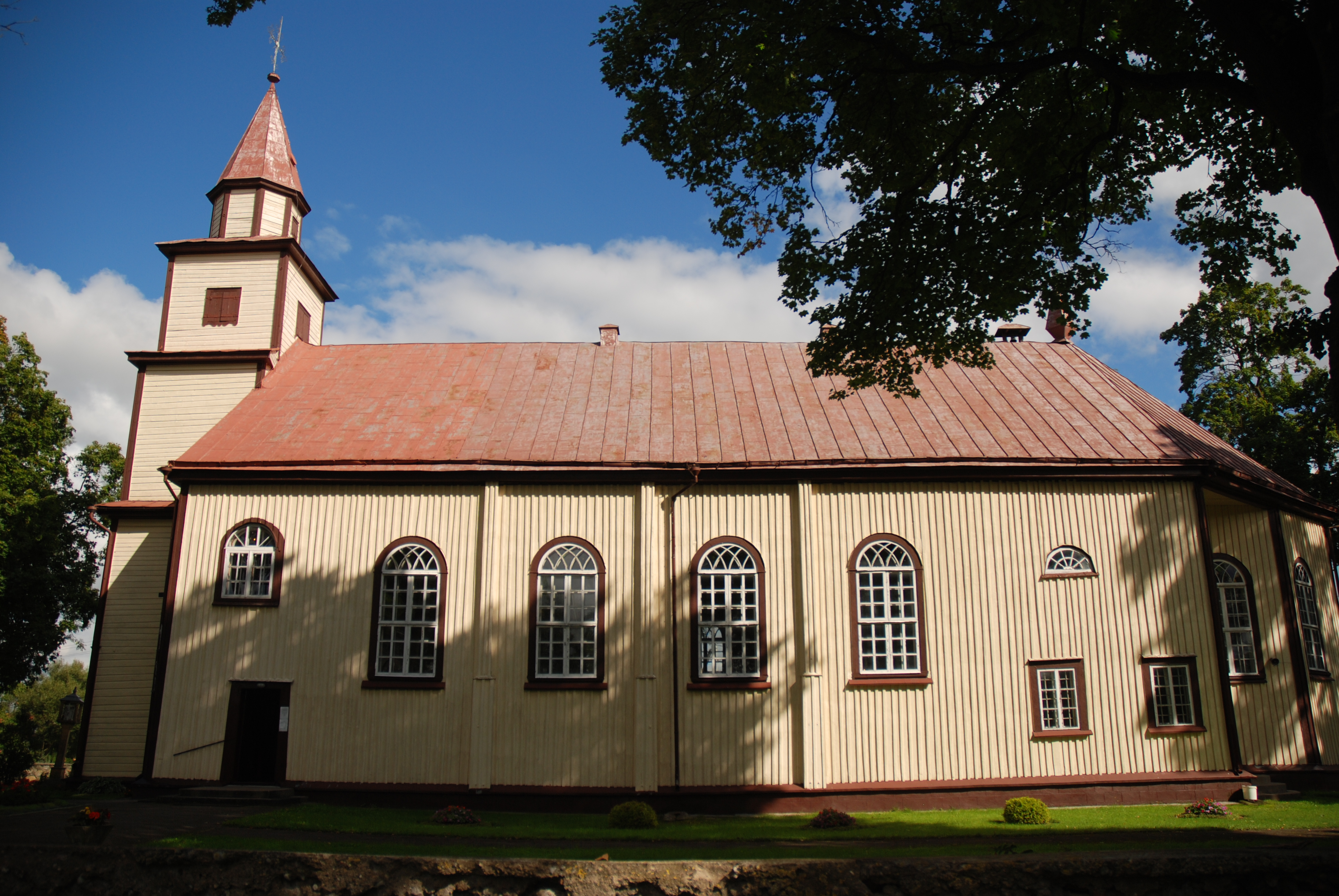

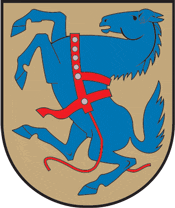
- Coat of arms

- Location of Klovainiai
- Coordinates: 55°56′N 23°57′E
- Country: Lithuania
- Ethnographic region: Aukštaitija
- County: Šiauliai County
- Municipality: Pakruojis district municipality
- Eldership: Klovainiai eldership
- Capital of: Klovainiai eldership

Population (2011)
  - Total: 785
- Time zone: UTC+2 (EET)
  - Summer (DST): UTC+3 (EEST)

Klovainiai is a town in the Pakruojis district municipality in north central Lithuania. According to the 2011 census, it had population of 785.
