= Antanas Venclova =

Soviet Lithuanian politician, poet, journalist and translator (1906–1971)

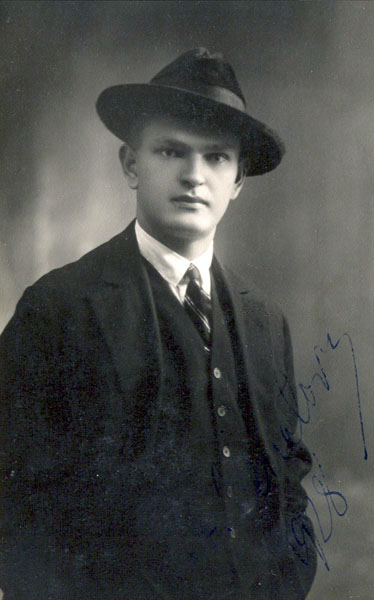
Venclova in 1928

Antanas Venclova (7 January 1906 – 28 June 1971) was a Soviet and Lithuanian politician, poet, journalist and translator.

== Early life ==
Born in Trempiniai in Suwałki Governorate, Venclova studied Lithuanian, Russian and French at the Vytautas Magnus University in Kaunas. In 1936, he visited the Soviet Union, becoming fascinated with the Soviet system and its culture. Before the outbreak of World War II, he worked as a teacher and was the editor of the pro-communist journals Trečias frontas (Third Front) and Prošvaistė.

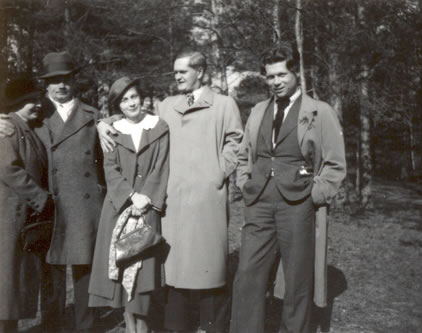
Antanas Venclova (2nd from right) and Petras Cvirka (right) in 1934

== Politician ==
Following the Soviet occupation of Lithuania in 1940, he was briefly appointed as Minister of Education of the Lithuanian SSR. He was elected as a representative to the "People's Seimas" and went to Moscow as part of the delegation requesting that Lithuania be incorporated into the Soviet Union. After the German invasion of the Soviet Union in 1941, he retreated with the Red Army and remained in Soviet Russia during the Nazi occupation, returning to Lithuania in 1944.

In the following years, he faithfully served the Soviet government.

In 1947, he received the Stalin Prize. Venclova wrote the original words for the anthem of the Lithuanian SSR and translated the lyrics of the Soviet anthem into Lithuanian. After Joseph Stalin's death, the second stanza of the Lithuanian anthem's lyrics was changed by Vacys Reimeris to remove any mention of Stalin. Between 1954 and 1959, Venclova was Chairman of the Lithuanian Writer's Union. He died in Vilnius in 1971 and was buried at the Antakalnis cemetery.

== Family ==
His son, the poet Tomas Venclova, was a prominent dissident.
