= National Kaunas Drama Theatre =

Theatre in Kaunas, Lithuania

Coordinates: 54°53′49″N 23°54′38″E

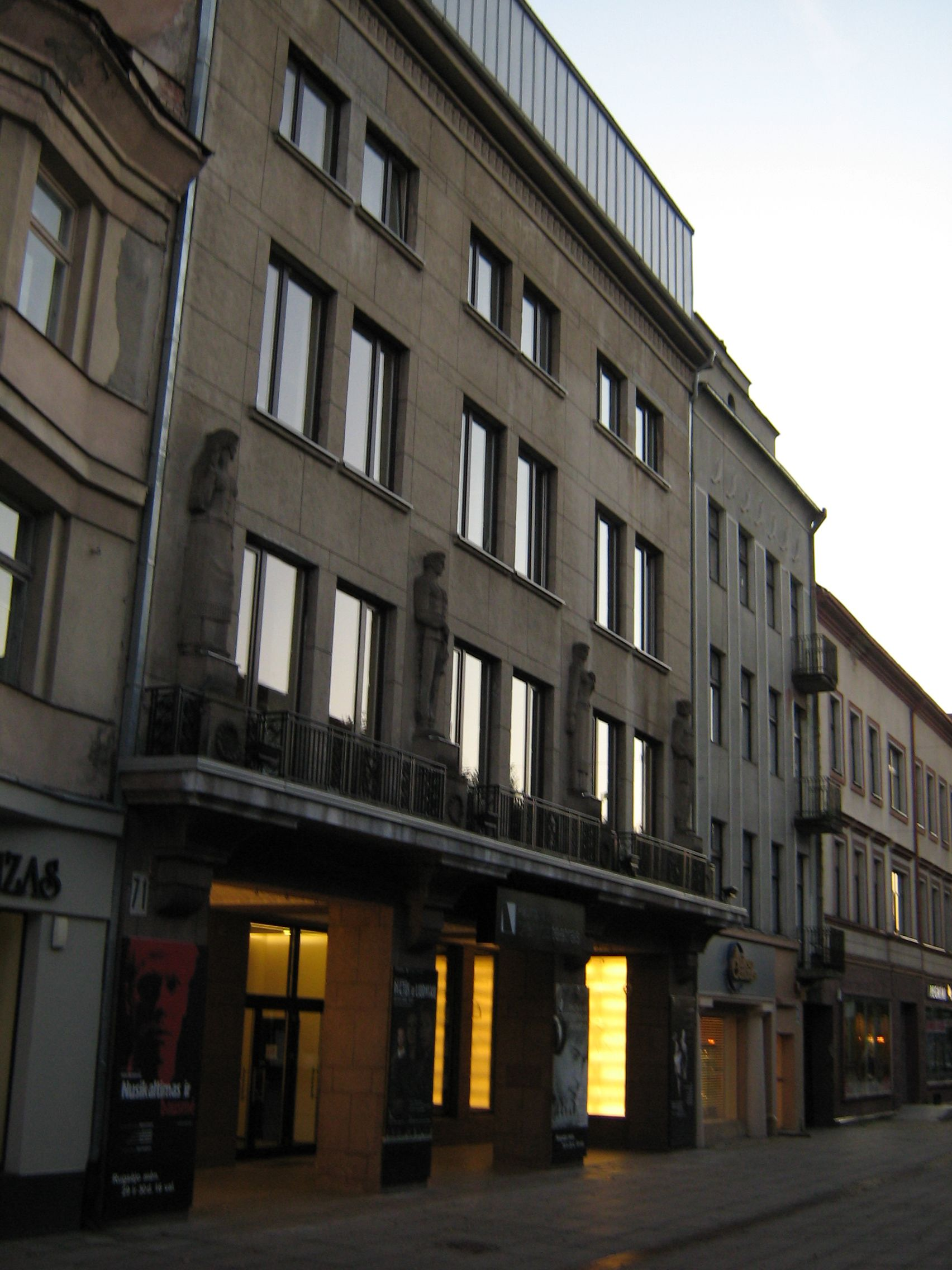
National Kaunas Drama Theatre

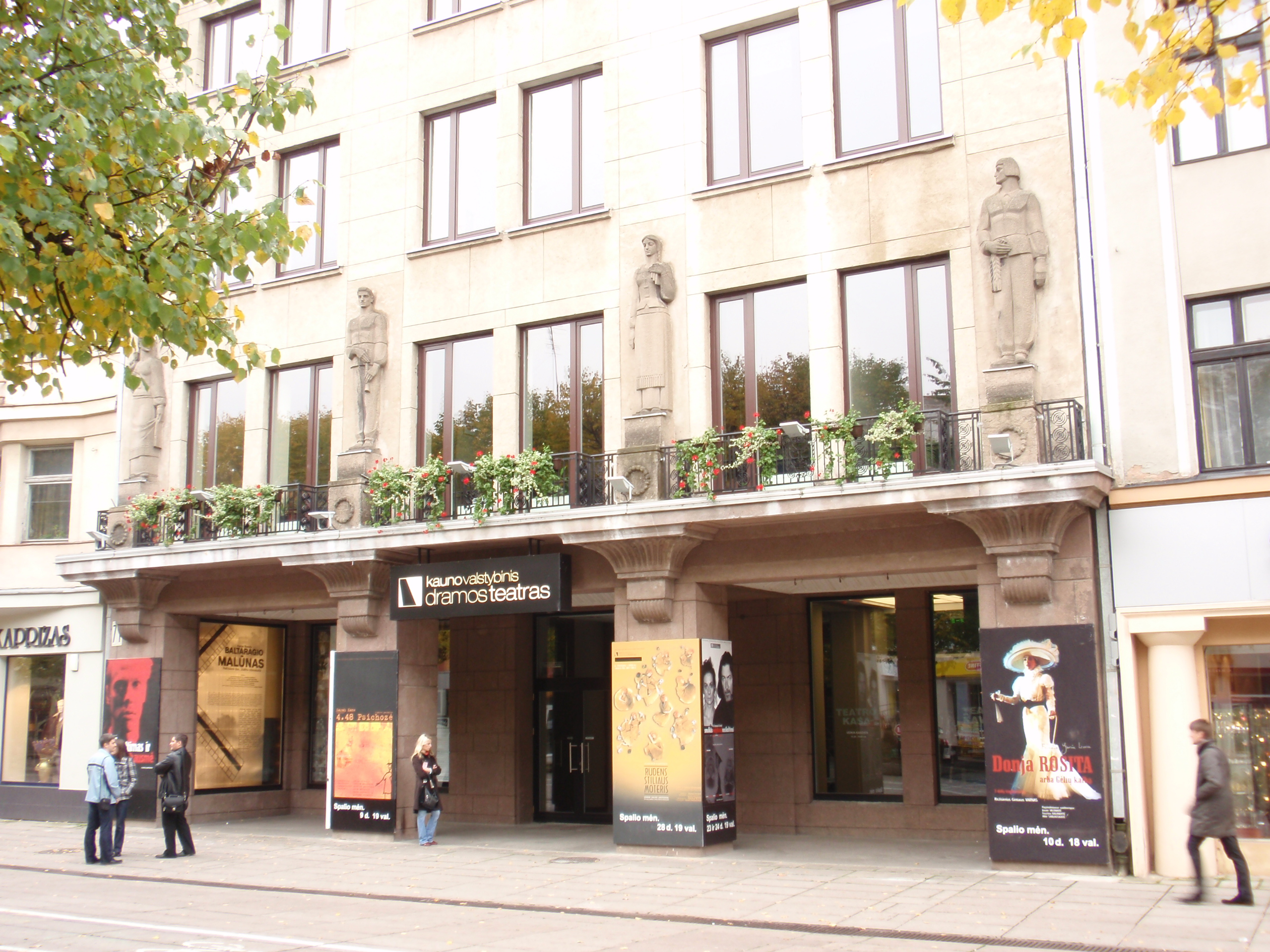
Entrance of the theatre (2008)

The National Kaunas Drama Theatre (NKDT), formerly Kaunas State Drama Theatre, is a theatre and theatre company in Kaunas, Lithuania. The company is the oldest professional theatre troupe in Lithuania, founded in 1920 at the building now known as the Kaunas State Musical Theatre. It moved to its current location, the building formerly housing the "Metropolitain" (or "Metropolitan") cinema, in 1959.

== History ==
=== Company ===
Kaunas became the temporary capital of Lithuania during the period of the First Republic after World War I.

The company now known as National Kaunas Drama Theatre was founded on 19 December 1920, making it the oldest professional theatre in Lithuania. It was founded in and based at the former Russian City Theatre, now known as the Kaunas State Musical Theatre.

Many of the actors initially came from the Flying Theatre of Juozas Vaičkus (1885–1935), founded in 1918 in St. Petersburg, Russia, and later merged with that of Konstantinas Glinskis. Vaičkus became the director of the new State Theatre. In November 1920, the first contracts with actors were signed, including Juozas Staniulis, Petras Kubertavičius, Ona Kurmytė, Polė Tendžiulytė, Antanina Vainiūnaitė, Teofilė Dragūnaitė-Vaičiūnienė, Viktoras Dineika, and Povilas Mačinskas. Hermann Sudermann's St. John's Day, directed by Vaičkus, was the first play staged by the new company at the State Theatre, in December 1920.

In 2022 the theatre was nationalised.

After some reforms, Glinskis became its new manager. In 1926 he was forced out by the new manager, Antanas Sutkus, along with many other actors. Sutkus brought in actors from the defunct Vilkolakis and Tautos theatres. Other past directors included Borisas Dauguvietis, Andrius Oleka-Žilinskas, Mikhailas Chekhovas, H. Vancevičius, J. Jurašas, J. Vaitkus, G. Padegimas, and G. Varnas.

Actors were trained by the State Theatre School of Acting, established in 1924 and led by Glinskis, Dauguvietis, Oleka-Žilinskas, and Sutkus. The company was the only professional theatre organisation in Lithuania until 1931, when the State Theatre Department was founded in Šiauliai.

In 1928 Sutkus was replaced by Jurgis Savickis, who in 1929 invited Oleka-Žilinskas, from the Moscow Art Theatre. Oleka-Žilinskas sought to improve performances using the methods of Konstantin Stanislavsky and Vladimir Nemirovich-Danchenko, and as part of this goal, he invited the renowned Mikhail Chekhov to join the theatre. Together they trained young actors and established The Young Theatre; although their work was acclaimed by critics, the broader public showed little appreciation. Later Oleka-Žilinskas was forced to leave the theatre. The company was forced to implement the Socialist realist understanding of art and was forced to praise the new regime.

The company was the only professional theatre organisation in Lithuania until 1931, when the State Theatre Department was founded in Šiauliai. Around 170 productions were staged before World War II.

During the Nazi occupation of Lithuania during World War II, demands for the praise of that regime were also made. In 1947 a group of Lithuanian students went to GITIS, Russia, and when they returned after graduating in 1952, a new era began at the theatre.

In 1959, the drama and musical theatre companies separated: the drama theatre moved to its present location at Laisvės alėja 71, in the refurbished former "Metropolitan" (also spelt "Metropolitain") cinema (built 1928), and the musical theatre company took up residence in the Kaunas City Theatre.

=== Building ===
The Metropolitan (or Metropolitain) cinema was one of the first purpose-built movie theatres in Lithuania, and was a rare example of the Zigag Moderne style of Art Deco architecture. The renovation to create the Drama Theatre included the cinema as well as some surrounding buildings.

An initial design by Kazimieras Bučas was commissioned in 1953, but was not carried out owing to lack of funding. A major renovation was carried out in 1956, preserving much of the old buildings, and with a fairly reserved facade, which retained the four sculptures at the entrance. The current building is a typical example socialist realist architecture, according to Stalinist architectural doctrines of the period. Various other alterations and modernisations were carried out between 2005 and 2013.

== 21st century ==
In November 2012 the theatre gained the status of "national theatre", and was renamed the National Kaunas Drama Theatre (NKDT).

The Art Deco features of the original Metropolitan cinema have been retained and restored, and the theatre has been upgraded to a level that makes it the most modern theatre in the Baltic region. There are four stages in use in the main building: Main Stage, the Small Stage, Ruta's Hall, the Long Hall, with some smaller spaces also used for performances in an adjoining wing. Around 350 events are staged in each season, which lasts from September to June. The Main Stage can accommodate nearly 500 people, which is 200 fewer than the old Metropolitain cinema once could. The building remains a large and complex structure.

Recent directors include A. Jankevičius, A. Areima, V. Bareikis, E. Kižaitė, and as of 2023, the troupe consists of 33 actors, with occasional guest actors.

== Notable actors ==
- Algirdas Masiulis
- Antanina Vainiūnaitė
- Dainius Svobonas
- Ingeborga Dapkūnaitė
- Juozas Budraitis
- Jūratė Onaitytė
- Konstantinas Glinskis
- Ona Jonaitytė
- Rūta Staliliūnaitė
- Viktoras Šinkariukas
- Vytautas Grigolis

== Notable directors ==
- Romualdas Tumpa
- Andrius Oleka-Žilinskas
- Borisas Dauguvietis
- Eimuntas Nekrošius
- Gintaras Varnas
- Henrikas Vancevičius
- Jonas Jurašas
- Jonas Vaitkus
- Konstantinas Glinskis
- Stasys Motiejūnas

== Notable scenographers ==
- Mstislav Dobuzhinsky
- Liudas Truikys

== Notable plays ==
- Barbora Radvilaitė by Juozas Grušas
- Herkus Mantas by Juozas Grušas
- Baltaragis's Mill
- The Pilgrim of Dreams
- Ubu Roi by Alfred Jarry
- Thrush, the Green Bird
