= Jonas Švedas =

Jonas Švedas (9 October [O.S. 26 September] 1908 in Liepāja – 15 October 1971 in Vilnius) was a Lithuanian and Soviet composer. He was named a People's Artist of the USSR in 1954. He was the co-composer of the Anthem of the Lithuanian Soviet Socialist Republic along with Balys Dvarionas.
