= Order of the Lithuanian Grand Duke Gediminas =

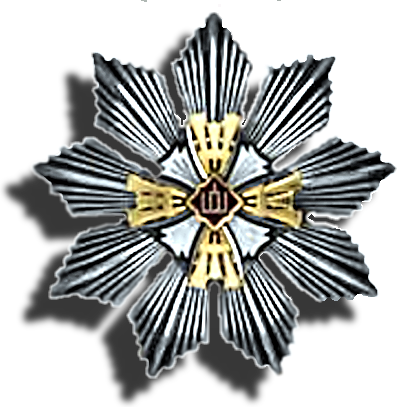
- Breast star of the Order
- Type: 5 Class Order with associated medal
- Awarded for: Outstanding performance in civil and public offices
- Presented by: Lithuania
- Eligibility: Citizens of Lithuania and foreign nationals
- Established: 1928 re-established 1991

Precedence
- Next (higher): Order of the Cross of Vytis
- Next (lower): Order for Merits to Lithuania

The Order of the Lithuanian Grand Duke Gediminas is the Lithuanian Presidential Award which was re-instituted to honour the citizens of Lithuania for outstanding performance in civil and public offices. Foreign nationals may also be awarded this Order. The Order of the Lithuanian Grand Duke Gediminas was instituted in 1928. It features the Columns of Gediminas, one of the national symbols of Lithuania.

== Classes ==
The Order of the Lithuanian Grand Duke Gediminas has five classes:

1. Grand Cross
2. Commander's Grand Cross
3. Commander's Cross
4. Officer's Cross
5. Knight's Cross
6. Medal

== Notable recipients ==
The first five persons awarded the Order of the Lithuanian Grand Duke Gediminas after the restoration of the Independent State of Lithuania in 1991 were poets Justinas Marcinkevičius, Bernardas Brazdžionis, priest Ričardas Mikutavičius, painter Vytautas Kazimieras Jonynas and mathematician Jonas Kubilius.

=== Other notable recipients ===
- Victor Orban, Hungarian prime minister
- Edvard Beneš, Czech politician and President of Czechoslovakia
- Elena Bonner, physician, Soviet human rights activist, writer, wife of Andrei Sakharov
- Algirdas Budrys, clarinetist
- Christopher Cox, former U.S. Representative
- Štefan Füle, Czech politician and diplomat
- James L. Jones, retired United States National Security Advisor and Commandant of the Marine Corps
- Jacek Kuroń, Polish historian and politician
- Ina Marčiulionytė, Ambassador and Permanent Delegate of the Republic of Lithuania to UNESCO
- George Robertson, Baron Robertson of Port Ellen, tenth Secretary General of the North Atlantic Treaty Organization
- Mstislav Rostropovich, cellist
- Juan Antonio Samaranch, former President of the International Olympic Committee
- George Soros, philanthropist
- Antanina Vainiūnaitė-Kubertavičienė, Lithuanian actress
- Albrecht Freiherr von Boeselager, Grand Chancellor of the Sovereign Military Order of Malta
- Arvydas Každailis, Lithuanian artist
- Jonas Trinkūnas, krivis (high priest) of the Romuva faith

== Images of order insignia ==
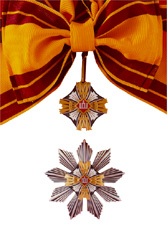
1st Class Order

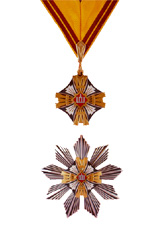
2nd Class Order

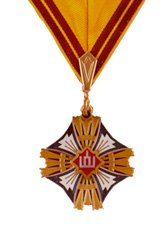
3rd Class Order

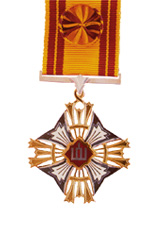
4th Class Order

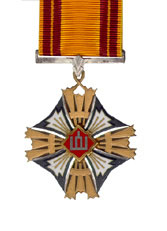
5th Class Order

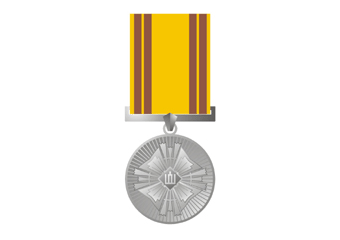
Medal
