= Balys Dvarionas =

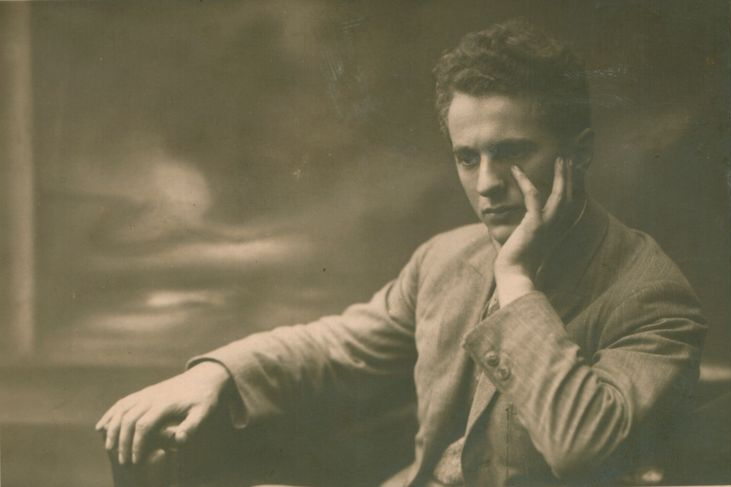
- Dvarionas c. 1930

Background information
- Born: 19 June 1904; Liepāja, Latvia
- Died: 23 August 1972 (aged 68) Vilnius, Lithuanian SSR, Soviet Union
- Genre: Classical
- Occupations: Composer, pianist, conductor, educator
- Instrument: Piano

Balys Dvarionas (19 June [O.S. 6 June] 1904 – 23 August 1972) was a Soviet and Lithuanian composer, pianist, conductor, and educator. Dvarionas first became known as a composer after World War II. His works are in a romantic vein, with roots in folk song.

== Biography ==
Balys Dvarionas was born in Liepāja into the large family of an organist. Along with his ten sisters and brothers, Dvarionas was taught music from his early childhood. Later he had private lessons from Alfrēds Kalniņš, the famous Latvian composer. After completing the middle school of commerce, Dvarionas worked as an organist and conductor of the Youth Choir of Lithuanian Society in Liepāja. In 1920, Dvarionas went to Leipzig, where he studied piano under Robert Teichmüller at the Conservatory and attended special music theory and composition courses held by Stephan Krehl and Sigfrid Karg-Elert. After graduating from the Conservatory in 1924, Dvarionas returned to Kaunas, Lithuania where he performed his first recital, and afterwards spent two years studying piano in Berlin under Egon Petri, a famous German pianist.

Balys Dvarionas was a synthesis of talents in piano, teaching, conducting and composing. They bloomed almost all at once and Dvarionas soon became one of the most famous personalities in Lithuanian music. From 1924 on he performed throughout Lithuania, and in 1928 he began to perform abroad. In 1926 he began teaching at the Kaunas Music School (after 1933 — Lithuanian Conservatory) and in 1949 he started working at the Music Academy in Vilnius, where he continued teaching until the end of his life. Dvarionas was awarded a professorship in 1947. Over 50 pianists graduated from Prof. B. Dvarionas’ class. Dvarionas's pupils included conductor Rimas Geniušas, pianists Liucija Drąsutienė, Aleksandras Jurgelionis, Gražina Ručytė-Landsbergienė, and Halina Znaidzilauskaitė.

In the 1930s, Dvarionas emerged as a conductor as well. He attended conducting courses in Salzburg and in 1939 he passed his examinations as an external student at the Conservatory in Leipzig. From 1935 to 1938 Dvarionas was a conductor of Kaunas Radiophone Orchestra. In 1939 he established the Vilnius City Orchestra together with the well-known Lithuanian architect Vytautas Landsbergis-Žemkalnis, and worked as a conductor there until the Lithuanian Philharmonic Orchestra was established, where he was head conductor in 1940–1941 and 1958–1964.

Dvarionas' final public performance was on 12 May 1972, with the Lithuanian Chamber Orchestra at the Philharmonic Hall; he played a Mozart piano concerto and conducted a mass by Schubert. He was already suffering from his final illness and died on 23 August 1972 in Vilnius. Balys Dvarionas is buried at the cemetery in Palanga, a seaside resort town in western Lithuania, where Dvarionas loved to spend summers, composing many pieces at his cottage.

== Works ==
Dvarionas composed a variety of works ranging from opera, ballet, symphony to music for film and theater. Balys Dvarionas, together with another prominent Lithuanian composer Jonas Švedas, was commissioned to compose the music for the Anthem of the Lithuanian SSR.

Dvarionas's musical works are distinctive for their melody, emotionality, and motives drawn from folk music. Rather than extensively developing his musical material, he preferred exposition and juxtaposition of various musical ideas. The music by Dvarionas may seem extemporaneous, but is natural and rhythmically flexible, and makes an impression of clear and colourful mood.

The composer said of his style in 1971: "My aesthetic ideals were formed under the influence of 19th century romanticism, and I believe in the musician's vocational call to spread beauty, good, harmony, to educate people and to raise them above the routine. I believe that people who say this type of view is behind the times are wrong. The ideals of human good have remained unchanged over many thousands of years: love, truth, freedom and friendship. To serve them is not a step backwards".

Most notable works by Balys Dvarionas:

- Ballet Matchmaking (Piršlybos), (presented 1933).
- Variations for bassoon and orchestra, 1946.
- Symphony in E minor I Bow To Native Land (Lenkiuos gimtajai žemei), 1947.
- Concerto for violin and orchestra, 1948.
- Opera Dalia, 1957 (presented 1959).
- 2 Concertos for piano and orchestra, 1960 and 1962.
- Concerto for French horn and orchestra, 1963.
- Various piano pieces: "24 pieces in all tonality", "Winter Sketches", "Little Suite", etc.
- Various violin pieces
- Songs for solo voice and accompaniment, choir
