= Vacys Reimeris =

Vacys Reimeris (3 August 1921, Kuršėnai – 6 February 2017, Vilnius) was a Soviet and Lithuanian poet, translator, and Honored Culture Worker of the Lithuanian SSR (1965).

== Biography ==
He graduated from elementary school in Kuršėnai in 1934 and completed a gymnasium course called Savišvieta (Self-study, likely a form of correspondence program) in 1941. At the beginning of World War II, he was evacuated into Russia. He joined the Communist Party of the Soviet Union in 1945. After the war, he worked on radio in Kaunas. He was the head of the Kaunas branch of the Lithuanian Writers' Union. He was the chief editor of the weekly newspaper of the Writers' Union Literatūra ir menas (Literature and Art, 1949–1959).

From 1951 to 1956 he studied at the Moscow Maxim Gorky Literature Institute. From 1952 to 1954 he was the secretary of the Lithuanian Writers' Union. In 1969–1986 he was editor in chief of the weekly newspaper Gimtasis kraštas (Native Land).

For a collection of poems Prie baltojo Tadž (By the White Taj, 1962) about India he was awarded the Jawaharlal Nehru Prize (1968). He received the State Prize of the Lithuanian SSR for a collection of poems for children Šarkos švarkas (Magpie's Jacket, 1975). In 1977 he won the Spring Poetry with Vėjo vynas (Wine of the Wind).

== Works ==
His first poem was published in 1934. The first book of poems Tėvų žemei (To Land of our Fathers) was published in 1945. Collections of poetry include Su pavasariu (With Spring, 1948), Ir skrenda daina (And a Song Flies, 1952), Su tavim aš kalbu (I'm Speaking with You, 1958), Žemė su puokšte gėlių (Earth with a Bouquet of Flowers, 1986), Į svečius Liliputijon (Visiting the Land of Lilliputs, 2001).

He published a collection of essays about Lithuania Lietuva - broliška žemė (Lithuania, A Brotherly Land, 1966) and a book of impressions of a trip to United States Užatlantės laiškai (Transatlantic Letters, 1974).

In poetry, his themes include official optimism, peaceful labor, heroism, and struggle for peace of the Soviet people. His poetry has features of a report, often with a distinct narrative story-line. Much of the poems include love lyrics (especially the collection Ave Maria).

== Translations ==
Reimeris translated into the Lithuanian language poems by Aleksandr Tvardovsky, Alexander Pushkin, Konstantin Simonov, and others.

Works of Reimeris were translated into the languages of the Soviet Union. There are known translations in English, Polish, Russian, Ukrainian and other languages.
