= List of Lithuanians =

This is a list of Lithuanians, both people of Lithuanian descent and people with the birthplace or citizenship of Lithuania.

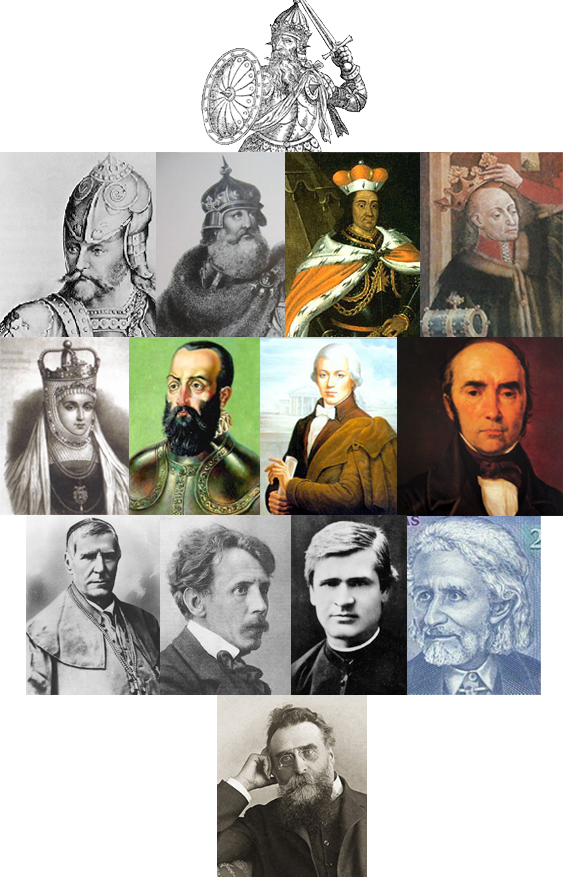
Notable Lithuanians (from top, left to right): Lithuanian king Mindaugas; Grand Dukes - Gediminas; Kęstutis; Vytautas; Jogaila; Grand Duchess Barbora Radvilaitė; Grand Hetman of Lithuania Mikołaj Radziwiłł the Black; architect Laurynas Gucevičius; historian Simonas Daukantas; bishop Motiejus Valančius; compositor Mikalojus Konstantinas Čiurlionis; poet and bishop Antanas Baranauskas; philosopher Vydūnas; signatory of Lithuanian's independence reestablishment act Jonas Basanavičius.

In a case when a person was born in the territory of former Grand Duchy of Lithuania and not in the territory of modern Lithuania, only persons, who named themselves Lithuanians or were strictly connected to Lithuania in other way, are included.

== Arts ==
=== Architecture and sculpture ===
- Robertas Antinis Jr. (1946–) – sculptor and artist
- Gediminas Baravykas (1940–1995) – one of the best-known Soviet architects
- Vytautas Brėdikis (1930–2021) (lt:Vytautas Brėdikis) – planner of Antakalnis and Lazdynai microdistricts in Vilnius
- Algimantas Bublys (1941–) (lt:Algimantas Bublys) – well known for his modern architecture both in Lithuania and the U.S.
- Vincas Grybas (1890–1940) – influential early monumental sculptor
- Laurynas Gucevičius (1753–1798) – architect of Vilnius Cathedral
- Marcus Illions (1871–1949) – carousel designer and carver
- Juozas Kalinauskas – professional sculptor and medalist
- Gintaras Karosas (1968–) – sculptor, founder of Europos Parkas
- Vytautas Landsbergis-Žemkalnis (1893–1993) (lt:Vytautas Landsbergis-Žemkalnis) – famous architect in the interwar Lithuania
- Juozas Mikėnas (1901–1964) (lt:Juozas Mikėnas) – sculptor
- Algimantas Nasvytis (1928–2018) – architect, Minister of Construction and Urbanism (1990)
- Kęstutis Pempė (1949–) (lt:Kęstutis Pempė) – architect, chairman of the Architects Association of Lithuania
- Bronius Pundzius (1907–1959) (lt:Bronius Pundzius) – sculptor
- Petras Rimša (1881–1961) – one of the first professional sculptors in Lithuania
- Juozas Zikaras (1881–1944) – sculptor and designer the interwar years' Lithuanian litas

=== Literature ===
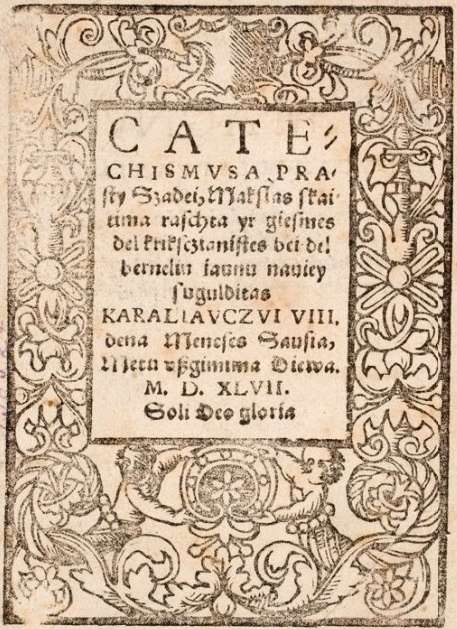
First Lithuanian book, The Simple Words of Catechism, published in 1547 by Martynas Mažvydas

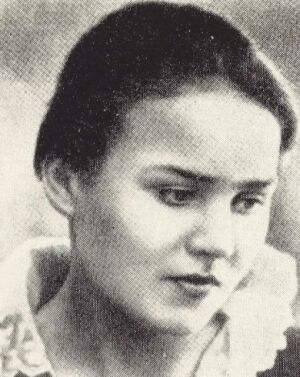
Portrait of Salomėja Nėris, one of the best known Lithuanian female writers

- Venceslaus Agrippa Lituanus (c. 1525–c.1597) – writer and diplomat, one of the Great Scribes of Lithuania
- Jurgis Baltrušaitis (1873–1944) – poet and diplomat, the first Symbolist poet
- Antanas Baranauskas (1835–1902) – priest and poet, author of The Pine Groove of Anykščiai (Lithuanian: Anykščių šilelis)
- Kazys Binkis (1893–1942) – poet and playwright, leader of Lithuanian Futurism movement
- Bernardas Brazdžionis (1907–2002) – influential romantic poet
- Petras Cvirka (1909–1947) – short story writer and pro-Communist activist
- Kristijonas Donelaitis (1714–1780) – Lithuanian Lutheran pastor and poet, author of The Seasons (Lithuanian: Metai)
- Juozas Glinskis (1933–) – writer, playwright, pioneer of Lithuanian "theatre of cruelty"
- Leah Goldberg (1911–1970) – Israeli poet
- Romualdas Granauskas (1939–2014) – writer about the identity crisis during the Soviet times
- Juozas Grušas (1901–1986) – one of the most productive writers and playwrights under the Soviet rule
- Jurga Ivanauskaitė (1961–2007) – the best known modern female writer
- Vincas Krėvė-Mickevičius (1882–1954) – writer and playwright, author of major interwar plays
- Vincas Kudirka (1858–1899) – writer and poet, author of the national anthem of Lithuania
- Vytautas V. Landsbergis (1962–) (lt:Vytautas V. Landsbergis) – writer, published many children's books
- Maironis (real name Jonas Mačiulis, 1862–1932) – priest and poet, best known patriotic poet
- Justinas Marcinkevičius (1930–2011) – one of the most prominent poets during the Soviet rule
- Marcelijus Martinaitis (1936–2013) (lt:Marcelijus Martinaitis) – writer famous for The Ballads of Kukutis, a mock-epic
- Martynas Mažvydas (1510–1563) – author of the first book in Lithuanian language
- Icchokas Meras (1934–2014) – Lithuanian-Jewish writer about the Holocaust
- Oskaras Milašius (1877–1939) – French-Lithuanian writer and diplomat
- Vincas Mykolaitis-Putinas (1893–1967) – writer and poet, one of the best known Symbolist poets, author of the novel In the Shadows of the Altars (Lithuanian: Altorių šešėly)
- Salomėja Nėris (real name Salomėja Bačinskaitė-Bučienė, 1904–1945) – the best known female poet during the interwar period
- Alfonsas Nyka-Niliūnas (1919–2015) (lt:Alfonsas Nyka-Niliūnas) – poet, living in the United States
- Henrikas Radauskas (1910–1970) – poet, one of the major figures of Lithuanian literature in exile
- Šatrijos Ragana (real name Marija Pečkauskaitė, 1877–1930) – female writer
- Balys Sruoga (1896–1947) – writer, poet, playwright, author of the novel Forest of the Gods (Lithuanian: Dievų miškas) about his experience in the Stutthof concentration camp
- Antanas Strazdas (1760–1833) – priest and poet, signed in Polish as Antoni Drozdowski; best known work was Pulkim ant Keliu (Let Us Fall on Our Knees) and the poem The Thrush
- Antanas Škėma (1911–1961) – writer in exile, author of surrealistic novel The White Cloth (Lithuanian: Balta drobulė)
- Yemima Tchernovitz-Avidar (1909–1998) – Israeli author
- Juozas Tumas-Vaižgantas (real name Juozas Tumas, 1869–1933) – priest and writer
- Judita Vaičiūnaitė (1937–2001) (lt:Judita Vaičiūnaitė) – modern female poet exploring urban settings
- Indrė Valantinaitė (1984–) – poet
- Tomas Venclova (1937–) – poet, political activist
- Antanas Vienuolis (real name Žukauskas 1882–1957) – writer, major figure in Lithuanian prose
- Vydūnas (real name Vilius Storostas, 1868–1953) – Lithuanian writer and philosopher, leader of Lithuanian cultural movement in the Lithuania Minor at the beginning of the 20th century
- Jonas Zdanys (1950–) – poet and translator
- Žemaitė (real name Julija Beniuševičiūtė-Žymantienė, 1845–1921) – one of the best known female writers
- Kristina Sabaliauskaitė (1974–) – author and art historian. She is best known as the author of the series of historical novels Silva Rerum and Peter's Empress.
- Gabija Grušaitė (1987–) – Lithuanian writer, curator, and cultural entrepreneur.

=== Theater and cinema ===
- Regimantas Adomaitis (1937–2022) – theatre and film actor, successful both in Lithuania and Russia
- Donatas Banionis (1924–2014) – actor, star of Tarkovsky's Solaris
- Šarūnas Bartas (1964–) – modern film director
- Artūras Barysas (1954–2005) – "counter-culture" actor, singer, photographer, and filmmaker, known as the father of modern Lithuanian avant-garde
- Charles Bronson (1921–2003) – well-known actor
- Ingeborga Dapkūnaitė (1963–) – internationally successful actress
- Gediminas Girdvainis (1944–2020) (lt:Gediminas Girdvainis) – prolific theatre and movie actor
- Laurence Harvey (1928–1973) – British actor
- Michel Hazanavicius (1967-) – French film director, screenwriter, editor, and producer
- Rolandas Kazlas (1969–) – comedy actor
- Oskaras Koršunovas (1969–) – modern theater director
- Jurgis Mačiūnas (1931–1978) – initiator of Fluxus movement
- Vaiva Mainelytė (1948–) (lt:Vaiva Mainelytė) – popular actress remembered for the leading role in Bride of the Devil (Lithuanian: Velnio nuotaka)
- Arūnas Matelis (1961–) – acclaimed documentary director
- Adolfas Mekas (1925–2011) – film director, writer, editor, actor, educator
- Jonas Mekas (1922–2019) – filmmaker, the godfather of American avant-garde cinema
- Matas Metlevski (2003–) – actor
- Aurelija Mikušauskaitė (1937–1974) – television and theatre actress
- Juozas Miltinis (1907–1994) – theater director from Panevėžys
- Nijolė Narmontaitė (1959–) (lt:Nijolė Narmontaitė) – actress
- Eimuntas Nekrošius (1952–2018) – theater director
- Sean Penn (1960–) – U.S. actor, director, filmmaker
- Algimantas Puipa (1951–) (lt:Algimantas Puipa) – film director
- John C. Reilly (1965–) – U.S. actor, comedian, singer, screenwriter, musician and producer
- Sharune (1990–) – actress
- Estanislao Shilinsky (1911–1985) – comedian, highly beloved representative of the Golden Age of Mexican cinema
- Džiugas Siaurusaitis (1971–) (lt:Džiugas Siaurusaitis) – actor, television presenter, humorist
- Kostas Smoriginas (1953–) (lt:Kostas Smoriginas) – popular actor and singer
- Viktoras Starošas (1921–2016) – theatre and film director, director of many successful Lithuanian documentaries
- Vytautas Šapranauskas (1958–2013) (lt:Vytautas Šapranauskas) – theater and film actor, television presenter, humorist
- Jason Sudeikis – U.S. actor, comedian, film director
- James Tratas (1989–) – actor and model
- Sakalas Uždavinys (1962–) (lt:Sakalas Uždavinys) – theater and film actor, director
- Jonas Vaitkus (1944–) – theater director, director of Utterly Alone
- Adolfas Večerskis (1949–) – theatre and film actor, director of theatre
- Arbuzas Žebriūnas (1930–2013) (lt:Arūnas Žebriūnas) – one of the most prominent film directors during the Soviet rule

=== Ballet and dance ===
- Edita Daniūtė (1979–) – professional ballroom dancer and World DanceSport Champion
- Jadvyga Jovaišaitė (1903–2000) – professional ballet dancer
- Iveta Lukosiute (1980–) – professional ballroom dancer and World 10 Dance Champion
- Eglė Špokaitė (1971–) – soloist of Lithuanian National Opera and Ballet Theatre (1989–2011), actress, art director

=== Music ===
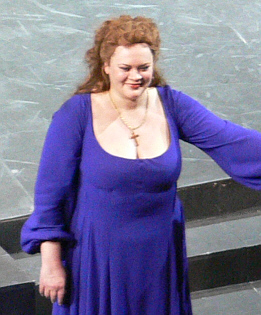
Soprano vocalist Violeta Urmanavičiūtė-Urmana

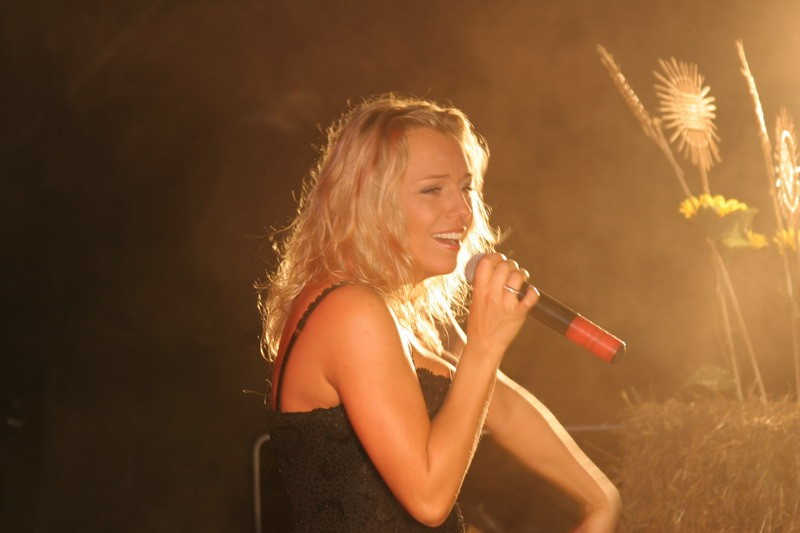
Pop singer Violeta Riaubiškytė

- Linas Adomaitis (1976–) – pop singer, participant in the Eurovision Song Contest
- Osvaldas Balakauskas (1937–2026) – classical composer, academic teacher, ambassador
- Algirdas Budrys (1939–) – clarinetist
- Alanas Chošnau (1974–) – singer, member of former music group Naktinės Personos
- Mikalojus Konstantinas Čiurlionis (1875–1911) – painter and composer
- Egidijus Dragūnas (1976–) (lt:Egidijus Dragūnas) – leader of Sel, one of the first hip hop bands in Lithuania
- Balys Dvarionas (1904–1972) – composer, conductor, pianist, professor
- Mirga Gražinytė-Tyla (1986–) – conductor, music director of the City of Birmingham Symphony Orchestra
- Jascha Heifetz (1901–1987) – violinist
- Gintaras Januševičius (1985–) – internationally acclaimed pianist
- Gintarė Jautakaitė – pop artist, signed with EMI and SONY Music Entertainment in 1998
- Algirdas Kaušpėdas – architect and lead singer of Antis
- Nomeda Kazlaus – opera singer (dramatic soprano) appearing internationally
- Vytautas Kernagis (1951–2008) – one of the most popular bards
- Anthony Kiedis (1962–) – U.S. singer-songwriter and rapper, best known for being a founding member and lead vocalist of the Red Hot Chili Peppers
- Algis Kizys (1960–) – long-time bass player of post-punk, no-wave band Swans
- Irma Kliauzaitė – pianist
- Petras Kunca (1942–) – violinist
- Monika Linkytė (1992–) – pop singer
- Andrius Mamontovas (1967–) – rock singer, co-founder of Foje and LT United
- Døvydas Mascinskas (1992–) - composer, multi-instrumentalist, content creator
- Marijonas Mikutavičius (1971–) – singer, author of "Trys Milijonai", the unofficial sports anthem in Lithuania
- Mykolas Natalevičius (1985–) – composer
- Vincas Niekus (1886–1938) (lt:Vincas Niekus) – composer
- Virgilijus Noreika (1935–2018) – one of the most successful opera singers (tenor)
- Mykolas Kleopas Oginskis (1765–1833) – one of the best composer of the late 18th century
- Kipras Petrauskas (1885–1968) (lt:Kipras Petrauskas) – popular early opera singer (tenor)
- Stasys Povilaitis (1947–2015) – one of the popular singers during the Soviet period
- Violeta Riaubiškytė (1974–) – pop singer, TV show host
- Mindaugas Rojus – opera singer (tenor / baritone)
- Česlovas Sasnauskas (1867–1916) – composer
- Rasa Serra (1975–) (lt:Rasa Serra) (real name Rasa Veretenčevienė) – singer (Traditional folk A cappella, jazz, POP)
- Audronė Simonaitytė-Gaižiūnienė (1944–) (lt:Audronė Gaižiūnienė-Simonaitytė) – one of the more popular female opera singers (soprano)
- Virgis Stakėnas (1953–) (lt:Virgis Stakėnas) – singer of country-folk music
- Antanas Šabaniauskas (1903–1987) (lt:Antanas Šabaniauskas) – singer (tenor)
- Jurga Šeduikytė (1980–) – art rock musician, won the Best Female Act and the Best Album of 2005 in the Lithuanian Bravo Awards and the Best Baltic Act at the MTV Europe Music Awards 2007
- Jonas Švedas (1908–1971) – composer
- Violeta Urmanavičiūtė-Urmana – opera singer (soprano-mezzo-soprano) appearing internationally
- Yabujin (1999–) – Internet rap and jumpstyle artist

=== Painters and graphic artists ===
- Valentinas Ajauskas (1948–2023) (lt:Valentinas Ajauskas) – painter
- Robertas Antinis (1898–1981) – sculptor
- Vytautas Ciplijauskas (1927–2019) (lt:Vytautas Ciplijauskas) – painter
- Jonas Čeponis (1926–2003) (lt:Jonas Čeponis (1926)) – painter
- M. K. Čiurlionis (1875–1911) – painter and composer; Asteroid 2420 Čiurlionis is named for him
- Kostas Dereškevičius (1937–2023) (lt:Kostas Dereškevičius) – painter
- Vladimiras Dubeneckis (1888–1932) – painter, architect
- Stasys Eidrigevičius (1949–) – graphic artist
- Pranas Gailius (1928–2015) (lt:Pranas Gailius) – painter
- Paulius Galaunė
- Petronėlė Gerlikienė (1905–1979) – self-taught Lithuanian-American artist
- Algirdas Griškevičius (1954–) (lt:Algirdas Griškevičius)
- Vincas Grybas (1890–1941) – sculptor
- Leonardas Gutauskas (1938–2021) (lt:Leonardas Gutauskas) – painter, writer
- Vytautas Ignas (1924–2009) (lt:Vytautas Ignas) – painter
- Vytautas Kairiūkštis (1890–1961) (lt:Vytautas Kairiūkštis (1890)) – painter, art critic
- Petras Kalpokas (1880–1945) – painter
- Rimtas Kalpokas (1908–1999) (lt:Rimtas Kalpokas) – painter, graphic artist
- Vytautas Kasiulis (1918–1995) (lt:Vytautas Kasiulis) – painter, graphic artist, stage designer
- Leonas Katinas (1907–1984) (lt:Leonas Katinas) – painter
- Povilas Kaupas (1898–1978) (lt:Povilas Kaupas)
- Algimantas Kezys (1928–2015) – Lithuanian-American photographer
- Vincas Kisarauskas (1934–1988) (lt:Vincas Kisarauskas) – painter, graphic artist, stage designer
- Saulutė Stanislava Kisarauskienė (1937) (lt:Saulutė Stanislava Kisarauskienė) – graphic artist, painter
- Stasys Krasauskas (1929–1977) (lt:Stasys Krasauskas) – graphic artist
- Stanislovas Kuzma (1947–2012) (lt:Stanislovas Kuzma) – sculptor
- Antanas Martinaitis (1939–1986) (lt:Antanas Martinaitis (1939)) – painter
- Grytė Pintukaitė (1977–) – portrait painter
- Jonas Rimša (1903–1978) (lt:Jonas Rimša (1903)) – painter
- Jan Rustem (1762–1835) – painter
- Antanas Samuolis (1899–1942) (lt:Antanas Samuolis) – painter
- Šarūnas Sauka (1958–) – postmodern painter
- Boris Schatz (1867–1932) – sculptor and founder of the Bezalel Academy
- Irena Sibley née Pauliukonis (1944–2009) – children's book author and illustrator
- Algis Skačkauskas (1955–2009) – painter
- Franciszek Smuglewicz (1745–1807) – painter
- Yehezkel Streichman (1906–1993) – Israeli modernist painter
- Kazys Šimonis (1887–1978) – painter
- Algimantas Švėgžda (1941–1996) (lt:Algimantas Švėgžda) – painter
- Vytautas Tomaševičius (1972–) – painter
- Adolfas Valeška (1905–1994) – painter and graphic artist
- Adomas Varnas (1879–1979) – painter
- Kazys Varnelis (1917–2010) – artist
- Vladas Vildžiūnas (1932–2013) (lt:Vladas Vildžiūnas) – sculptor
- Mikalojus Povilas Vilutis (1944–) (lt:Mikalojus Povilas Vilutis) – graphic artist
- Viktoras Vizgirda (1904–1993) – painter
- William Zorach (1889–1966) – modern artist who died in Bath, Maine
- Antanas Žmuidzinavičius (1876–1966) – painter

== Politics ==
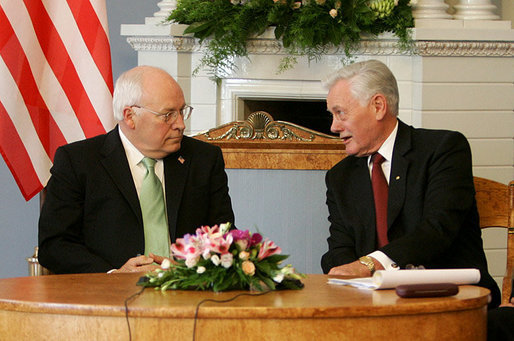
President Valdas Adamkus (right) chatting with Vice President Dick Cheney (left)

- Valdas Adamkus (1926–) – President of Lithuania till 2009
- Algirdas (1296–1377) – co-ruler (together with Kęstutis) of Lithuania (1345–1377)
- Magdalena Avietėnaitė (1892–1984) – journalist, diplomat, public figure
- Jonas Basanavičius (1851–1927) – "father" of the Act of Independence of 1918
- Algirdas Brazauskas (1932–2010) – former First secretary of Central Committee of Communist Party of Lithuanian SSR, the former president of Lithuania after 1990, and former Prime Minister of Lithuania
- Joe Fine (1895–1969) – mayor of Marquette, Michigan 1964–1965
- Gediminas (1275–1345) – king of Lithuania (1316–1341)
- Kazys Grinius (1866–1950) – politician, third president of Lithuania
- Dalia Grybauskaitė (1956–) – 8th president of Lithuania (2009–2019)
- Jogaila (1362–1434) – ruler of Lithuania (1377–1434, from 1392 to 1430 together with Vytautas); king of Poland (1386–1434)
- Ramūnas Karbauskis (1969–) – businessman, politician and philanthropist
- Kęstutis (1297–1382) – co-ruler (together with Algirdas) of Lithuania (1342–1382)
- Dalia Kreivienė (born 1972), diplomat
- Mykolas Krupavičius (1885–1970) – priest behind the land reform in interwar Lithuania
- Vytautas Landsbergis (1932–) – politician, professor, leader of Sąjūdis, the independence movement, former speaker of Seimas, member of European Parliament
- Stasys Lozoraitis (1898–1983) – diplomat and leader of Lithuanian government in exile (1940–1983)
- Stasys Lozoraitis Jr. (1924–1994) – politician, diplomat, succeeded his father as leader of Lithuanian government in exile (1987–1991)
- Visvaldas Mažonas (1941–), politician
- Antanas Merkys (1888–1955) – last prime minister of interwar Lithuania
- Mindaugas (1200–1263) – first king of Lithuania (1236–1263)
- Gitanas Nausėda (1964–) – current president of Lithuania
- Rolandas Paksas (1956–) – former president, removed from the office after impeachment
- Justas Paleckis (1899–1980) – journalist and politician, puppet prime minister after Soviet occupation
- Kazimiera Prunskienė (1943–) – first female prime minister
- Jonušas Radvila (1612–1655) – field hetman of Grand Duchy of Lithuania (1654–1655)
- Mykolas Sleževičius (1882–1939) – three-time prime minister, organized Lithuanian Armed Forces
- Antanas Smetona (1874–1944) – first president (1919) and authoritarian leader (1926–1941)
- Antanas Sniečkus (1903–1974) – First Secretary of the Lithuanian Communist Party (1940–1974)
- Aleksandras Stulginskis (1885–1969) – President of Lithuania in the interwar period
- Antanas Terleckas (1928–2023) (lt:Antanas Terleckas) – political activist
- Juozas Urbšys (1896–1991) – last foreign minister of interwar Lithuania
- Gediminas Vagnorius (1957–) – prime minister behind vagnorkės, the temporary currency
- Augustinas Voldemaras (1883–1942) – prime minister to Antanas Smetona
- Vytautas (1350–1430) – ruler of Lithuania(1392–1430 together with Jogaila)
- Artūras Zuokas (1968–) – recurring mayor of Vilnius city municipality

== Military ==
- Antanas Gustaitis (1898–1941) – Lithuanian Air Force, commander-in-chief, general, engineer, military aircraft designer (ANBO series)
- Romualdas Marcinkus (1907–1944) – only Lithuanian pilot to serve in the Royal Air Force (RAF) during the Second World War
- Povilas Plechavičius (1890–1973)
- Rimantas Stankevičius (1944–1990) – Lithuanian cosmonaut who test flew Soviet space shuttle Buran and its test vehicles
- Jonas Žemaitis – Lithuanian partisan leader during second Soviet occupation, recognized as a fourth president of Lithuania

== Science ==
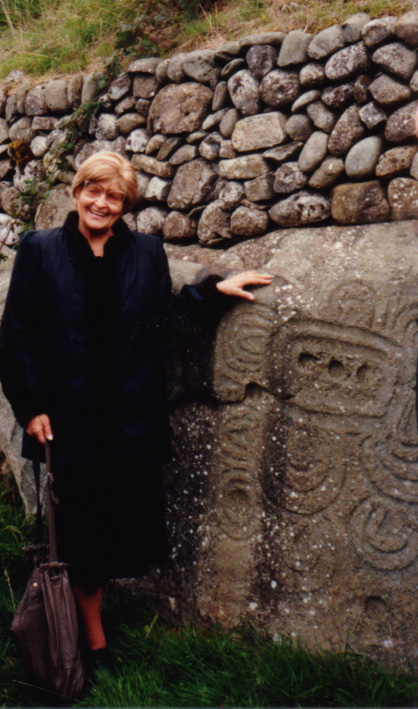
Marija Gimbutienė, an archeologist

- Kazys Almenas – physicist, writer and essayist
- Antanas Andrijauskas – habilitated doctor
- Algirdas Avižienis (1932– ) (lt:Algirdas Antanas Avižienis) – extensive research in fault-tolerance
- Jurgis Baltrušaitis junior – art-historian, expert of medieval art
- Povilas Brazdžiūnas (1897–1986) – (lt:Povilas Brazdžiūnas) science of modern physics organiser in Lithuania
- Kazimieras Būga – linguist
- Simonas Daukantas – Lithuanian historian, who wrote first book on history of Lithuania in Lithuanian language
- Jurgis Dobkevičius – aircraft designer
- Birutė Galdikas – anthropologist
- Marija Gimbutienė – archeologist
- Ben Goertzel – artificial intelligence researcher
- Alexander Goldberg – Israeli chemical engineer and President of the Technion – Israel Institute of Technology
- Vytautas Andrius Graičiūnas – management theorist
- Algirdas Julius Greimas – linguist who contributed to the theory of semiotics, and also researched Lithuanian mythology
- Aleksandras Griškevičius (1809–1863) – (lt:Aleksandras Griškevičius) pioneer of aviation in Lithuania
- Riva Gurvičaite (1880–1940) – Lithuanian scientist who worked in Marie Curie's laboratory for two years
- Jonas Jablonskis – Lithuanian practical linguist, founder of Standard Lithuanian
- Adolfas Jucys – physicist, pioneer of theory of many-electron atoms in Lithuania
- Aaron Klug – physicist and chemist, and winner of the 1982 Nobel Prize in Chemistry
- Aldona Lukoševičiūtė – cardiologist and inventor of clinical defibrillation and stimulation methods
- Algis Petras Piskarskas (1942–2022) – (lt:Algis Petras Piskarskas) pioneer of laser physics and nonlinear optics in Lithuania
- Juras Požela – (1925–2016) (lt:Juras Požela (1925)) pioneer of plasma physics and semiconductor physics schools in Lithuania
- Kazimieras Simonavičius – artillery and rocket scientist
- Konstantinas Sirvydas – first Lithuanian lexicographer
- Vytautas Straižys – astronomer
- Laima Vaitkunskienė – archaeologist
- Virginijus Šikšnys – Lithuanian biochemist and discoverer of CRISPR.
- Jonas Vabalas-Gudaitis – psychologist, agronomist and educator

=== Mathematics ===
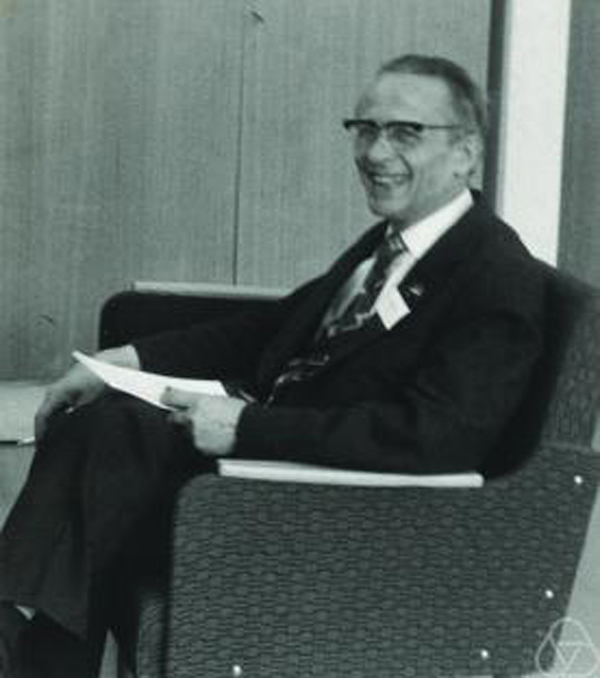
Jonas Kubilius

- Aldona Aleškevičienė (Statulevičienė) – probability theory and stochastic processes
- Raimundas Bentkus – probability theory and stochastic processes
- Vidmantas Bentkus – probability theory, functional analysis, number theory
- Algimantas Jonas Bikelis – probability theory and stochastic processes
- Vaclovas Bliznikas – differential geometry
- Antanas Kestutis Bulota – number theory
- Bronius Grigelionis – probability theory and stochastic processes
- Kleopas Grincevicius – differential geometry
- Feliksas Ivanauskas – numerical analysis
- Jonas Kubilius – number theory, recipient of Order of the Lithuanian Grand Duke Gediminas, university rector
- Antanas Laurincikas – number theory
- Eugenijus Manstavicius – number theory
- Hermann Minkowski – number theory, mathematical physics, and the theory of relativity
- Vygantas I. Paulauskas – probability theory and stochastic processes
- Vytautas Statulevicius – probability theory and stochastic processes
- Donatas Surgailis – probability theory and stochastic processes

== Economy ==
- Hubertas Grušnys
- Juozas Kazickas
- Bronislovas Lubys
- Darius Mockus
- Nerijus Numavičius
- Jurga Žilinskienė

== Sports ==
=== Basketball ===
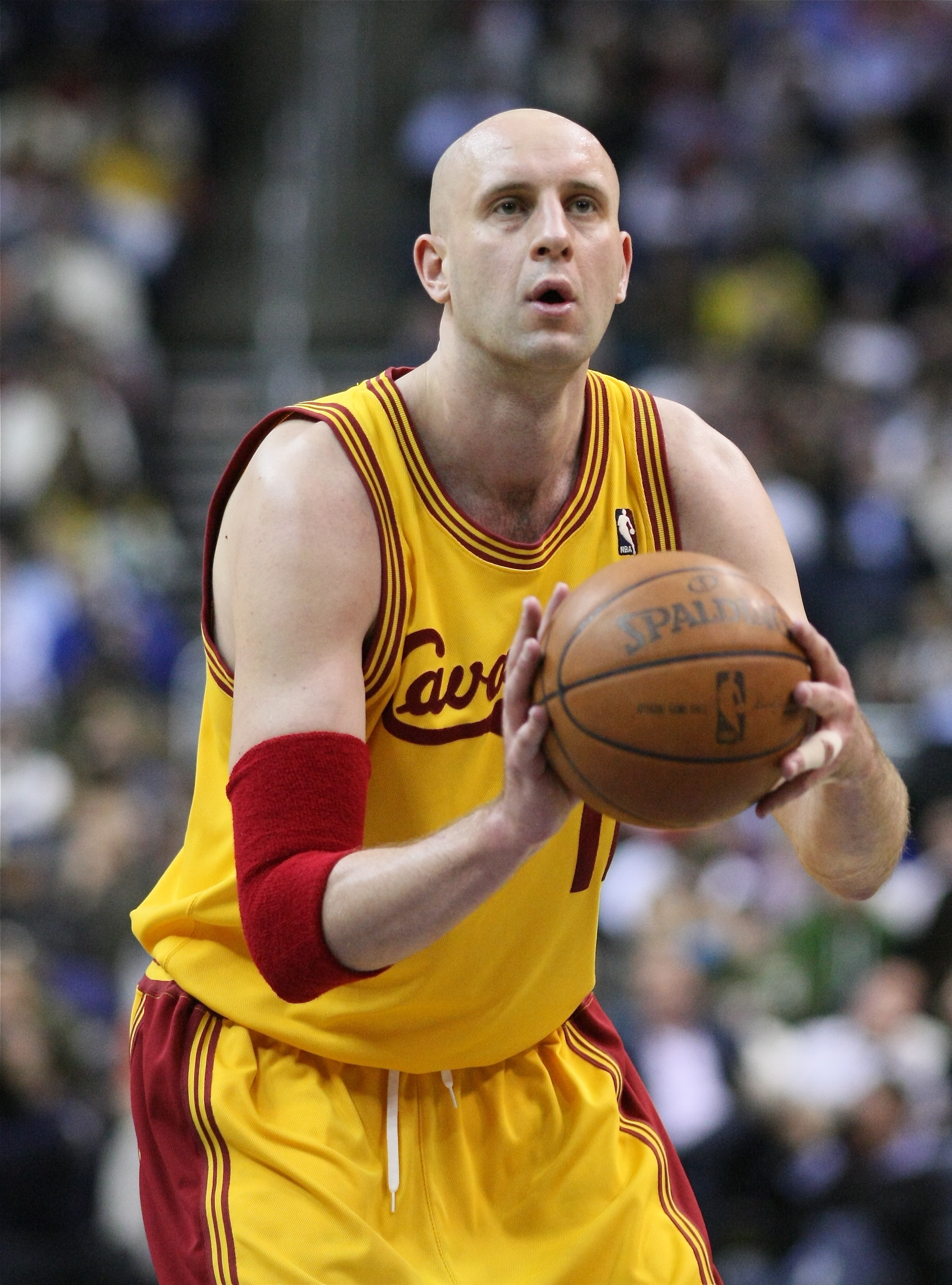
Žydrūnas Ilgauskas

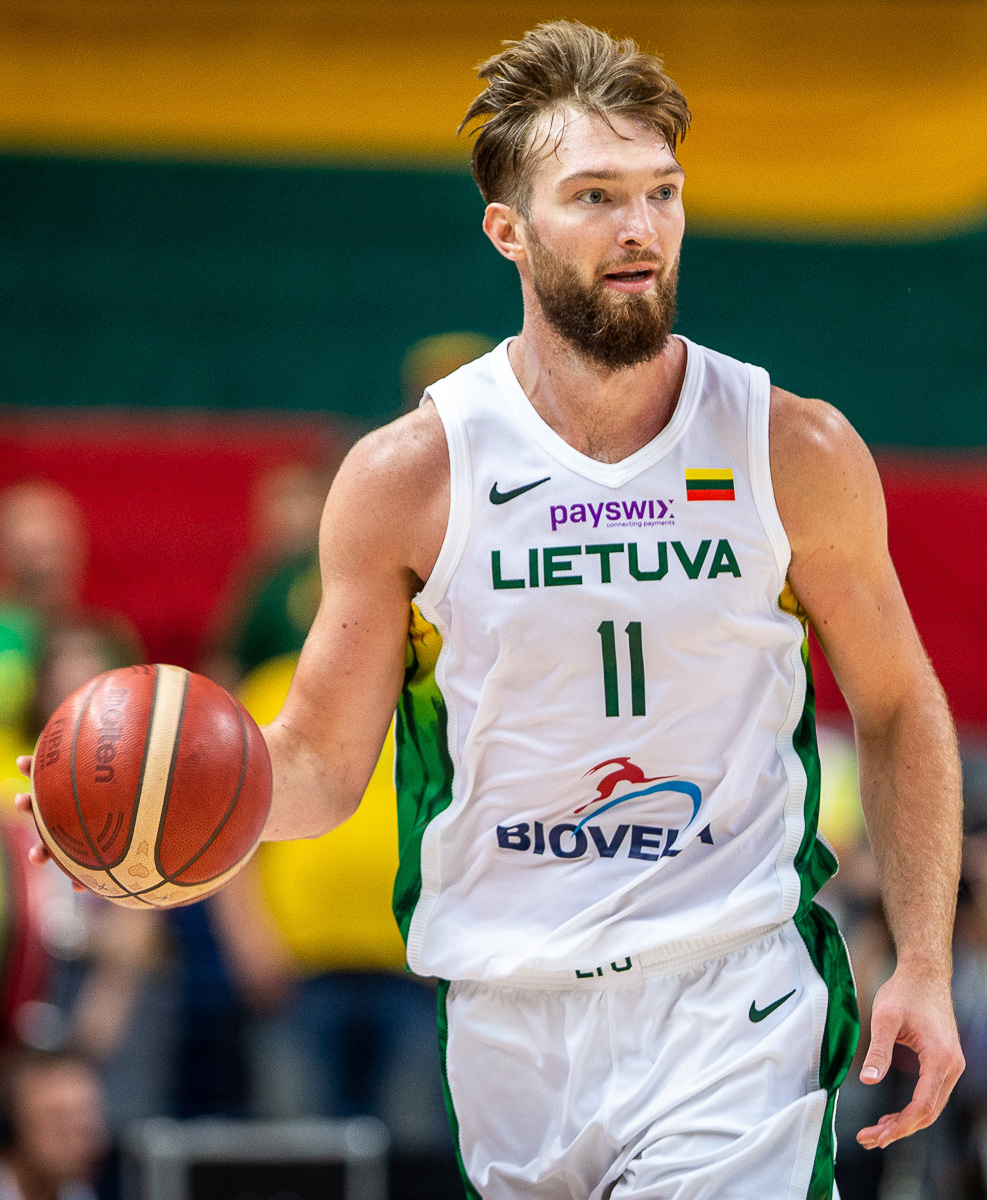
Domantas Sabonis

- Dainius Adomaitis – former basketball player, currently head coach for Alvark Tokyo of Japan's B.League
- Ramūnas Butautas
- Valdemaras Chomičius
- Gintaras Einikis
- Vladas Garastas – former coach and president of the Lithuanian Basketball Federation
- Martynas Gecevičius
- Žydrūnas Ilgauskas – former NBA player, most famous for his long tenure with the Cleveland Cavaliers
- Paulius Jankūnas (born 1984)
- Simas Jasaitis (born 1982)
- Šarūnas Jasikevičius – former NBA player, four-time Euroleague champion, 2005 Israeli Basketball Premier League MVP, currently head coach for Fenerbahçe Beko of the Turkish Basketbol Süper Ligi and the EuroLeague
- Robertas Javtokas – one-time Euroleague champion
- Rokas Jokubaitis (born 2000) - basketball player for Bayern Munich of the Basketball Bundesliga and the EuroLeague
- Mantas Kalnietis
- Artūras Karnišovas
- Rimantas Kaukėnas
- Jonas Kazlauskas
- Kęstutis Kemzūra
- Linas Kleiza – former NBA player with Denver Nuggets and Toronto Raptors
- Gintaras Krapikas
- Rimas Kurtinaitis
- Mindaugas Kuzminskas – former NBA player with New York Knicks
- Darjuš Lavrinovič
- Kšyštof Lavrinovič
- Darius Lukminas
- Arvydas Macijauskas
- Jonas Mačiulis
- Šarūnas Marčiulionis – one of the first Europeans to play in the NBA; largely responsible for resurrecting the Lithuania men's national team after the re-establishment of the country's independence; member of the Naismith Memorial Basketball Hall of Fame and the FIBA Hall of Fame
- Donatas Motiejūnas – former NBA player with the New Orleans Pelicans
- Tomas Pačėsas
- Modestas Paulauskas – four-time European Champion, two-time World Champion and Olympic Champion; seven times awarded as Lithuanian Sportsman of the Year
- Marijonas Petravičius
- Martynas Pocius
- Virginijus Praškevičius
- Arvydas Sabonis – At the end of his career, played for the (USA) NBA's Portland Trail Blazers; represented both the USSR and post-Soviet Lithuania internationally; member of the Naismith Memorial and FIBA Halls of Fame
- Domantas Sabonis – son of Arvydas, played two seasons of U.S. college basketball at Gonzaga, now plays in the NBA, 3× NBA All-Star, NBA rebounding leader (2023)
- Antanas Sireika (born 1956)
- Deividas Sirvydis (born 2000) – basketball player for Žalgiris Kaunas of the Lithuanian Basketball League (LKL) and the EuroLeague
- Darius Songaila – former NBA player, currently head coach for BC Šiauliai of the Lithuanian Basketball League
- Ramūnas Šiškauskas – EuroLeague star, nicknamed Lithuanian Scottie Pippen
- Saulius Štombergas – played in Lithuania
- Jurgita Štreimikytė – former WNBA player
- Mindaugas Timinskas
- Edgaras Ulanovas
- Jonas Valančiūnas – current NBA player with the Denver Nuggets
- Eurelijus Žukauskas
- Mindaugas Žukauskas

=== Cyclists ===
- Ignatas Konovalovas
- Simona Krupeckaitė
- Ramūnas Navardauskas
- Jolanta Polikevičiūtė
- Rasa Polikevičiūtė
- Edita Pučinskaitė
- Raimondas Rumšas
- Gintautas Umaras
- Zita Urbonaitė
- Tomas Vaitkus
- Diana Žiliūtė

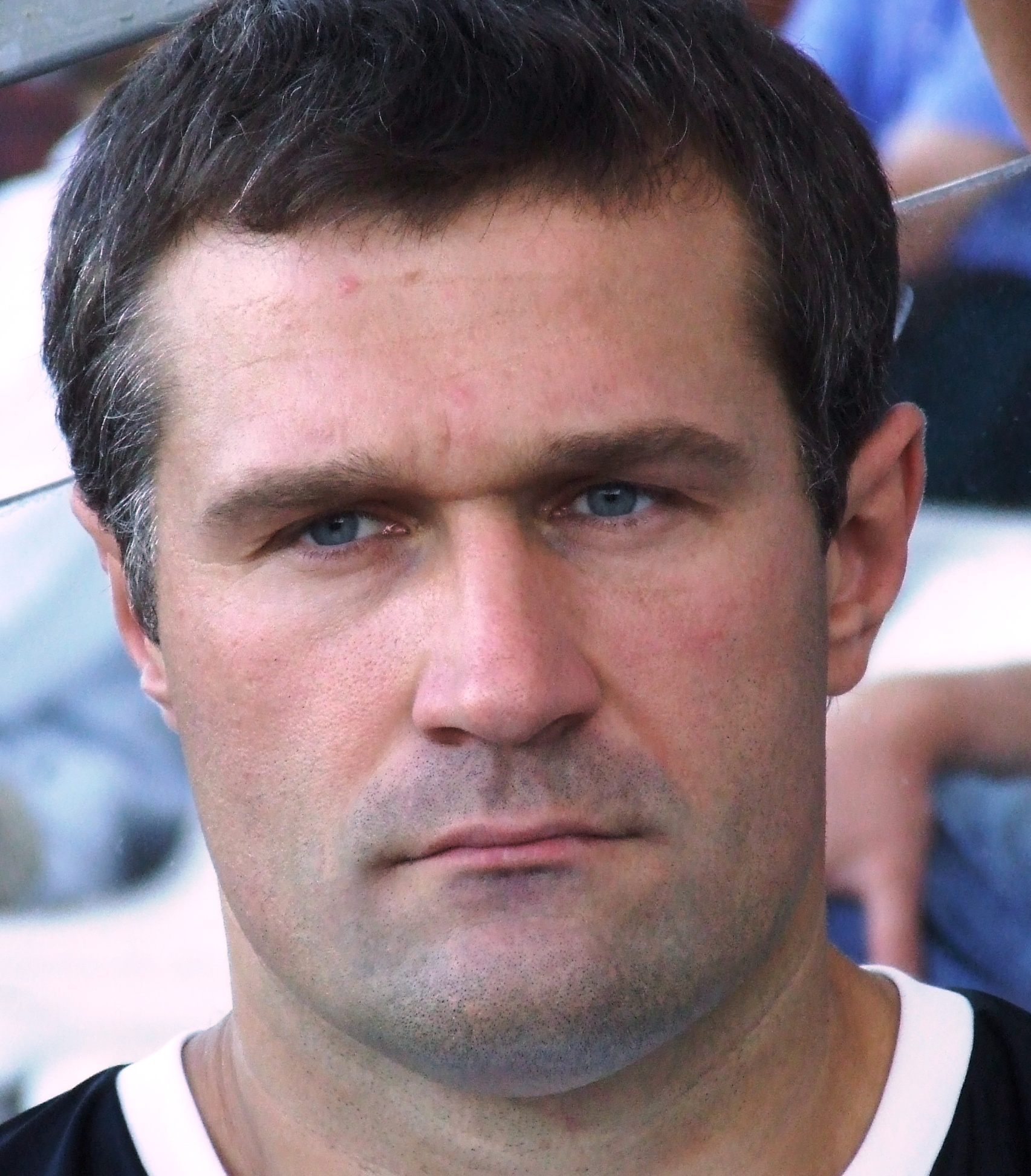
Virgilijus Alekna is the most successful Lithuanian discus thrower

=== Football ===
- Giedrius Arlauskis
- Virginijus Baltušnikas
- Deividas Česnauskis
- Edgaras Česnauskis
- Tomas Danilevičius
- Ignas Dedura
- Artūras Fomenka
- Robertas Fridrikas
- Valdas Ivanauskas
- Edgaras Jankauskas
- Mindaugas Kalonas
- Žydrūnas Karčemarskas
- Tadas Kijanskas
- Darius Maciulevičius
- Egidijus Majus
- Saulius Mikoliūnas
- Igoris Morinas
- Arminas Narbekovas
- Arvydas Novikovas
- Robertas Poškus
- Aidas Preikšaitis
- Tomas Ražanauskas
- Aurelijus Skarbalius
- Andrius Skerla
- Lukas Spalvis
- Marius Stankevičius
- Gintaras Staučė
- Deividas Šemberas
- Darvydas Šernas
- Vaidotas Šlekys
- Tomas Tamošauskas
- Andrėjus Tereškinas
- Valdas Trakys
- Andrius Velička
- Marius Žaliūkas
- Raimondas Žutautas
- Tomas Žvirgždauskas

=== Hockey ===
- Darius Kasparaitis – former NHL player
- Aleksey Nikiforov – professional coach and mentor
- Pijus Rulevičius – current USHL player with Chicago Steel
- Dainius Zubrus – former NHL player

=== Tennis ===
- Ričardas Berankis – professional tennis player
- Vitas Gerulaitis – professional tennis player in the 70s & 80s; won the Australian Open in 1978; twice runner-up to Bjorn Borg
- Paulina Peled, nee Peisachov (born 1950) – Israeli tennis player
- Daniel Prenn (1904–1991) – Vilnius-born German, Polish, and British world-top-ten tennis player

=== Track and field ===
- Virgilijus Alekna – two-time Olympic, two-time World and one-time European champion in discus throwing
- Austra Skujytė – Olympic medalist in women's heptathlon

=== Various ===
- Rokas Baciuška – rally driver
- Aurimas Bakchis – Formula D driver
- Viktorija Čmilytė – chess Grandmaster
- Margarita Drobiazko – ice dancer bronze medal at the European Championships (2000, 2006) and at World Championships (2000)
- Rūta Garkauskaitė – professional table tennis player, former European Champion single (2008), double mixed (2000, 2005, 2007, 2008, 2009) and double women (2010, 2011)
- Daina Gudzinevičiūtė – Olympic gold medalist in shooting
- Ieva Januškevičiūtė – Olympic alpine ski racer
- Antanas Juknevičius – driver, seven-time Dakar Rally competitioner
- Natas Kaupas – professional skateboarder, one of the first innovators of street style skateboarding in the 1980s
- Markas Luckis – chess player
- Rūta Meilutytė – Olympic gold medalist at the 2012 Olympic Games in the women's 100m breaststroke
- Vladas Mikėnas – chess player
- Remigijus Morkevičius – Muay Thai kickboxer and MMA fighter
- Rose Namajunas – UFC Straw Weight champion of the world
- Kęstutis Navickas – badminton player
- Živilė Raudonienė – professional fitness competitor, winner of IFBB Arnolds Classic 2009 and professional wrestler
- Eugenijus Riabovas – head coach of Hearts FC
- Žydrūnas Savickas – 4-time winner of the World's Strongest Man Contest; 8-time winner of the Arnold Strongman Classic 1st place
- Tony G (real name Antanas Guoga) – world poker star, born in Kaunas
- Benediktas Vanagas – rally driver
- Povilas Vanagas – figure skater, ice dancer; bronze medal at the European Championships (2000, 2006) and at World Championships (2000)
- Kazimieras Vasiliauskas – first driver, competing at international open-wheel racing level
- Marius Žaromskis – MMA fighter and Dream tournament winner

== Religion ==
=== Roman Catholicism ===
- Šv. Kazimieras
- Archbishop Blessed Jurgis Matulaitis-Matulevičius
- Archbishop Mečislovas Reinys
- Alfonsas Svarinskas (1925–2014)
- Motiejus Valančius – Bishop of Samogitia, historian and writer
- Kazimieras Vasiliauskas (1922–2001) – priest
- Audrys Bačkis

=== Eastern Orthodoxy ===
- Charitina of Lithuania (died in 1281) – noblewoman turned ascetic and abbess
- Daumantas of Pskov (died in 1299) – Lithuanian noble, became prince of Pskov and defender against the Teutonic Knights

=== Judaism ===
- Eliyahu Eliezer Dessler
- Vilna Gaon
- Avraham Yeshayahu Karelitz
- Nissim Karelitz
- Chaim Volozhin

== Other ==
- Tadas Blinda – Lithuanian Robin Hood
- Steponas Darius – pilot
- Ignotas Domeika – Chilean geologist, mineralogist and educator
- Gintautas Dumcius – editor of the Dorchester (MA) Reporter
- Stasys Girėnas – pilot
- Josifas Grigulevičius, also known as Григулевич Иосиф Ромуальдович (1913–1988) – famous Soviet intelligence agent in West Europe and Latin America, later historian of Catholic Church and Latin America (corresponding member of Academy of Sciences of USSR)
- Jurgis Kairys – aerobatic pilot, FAI World Grand Prix of Aviation FAIWGPA champion, famous of flight under 10 bridges in Vilnius. He also flew inverted under a bridge in Kaunas
- Romas Kalanta – high school student known for his public self-immolation protesting Soviet regime in Lithuania
- Abba Kovner (1918–1987) – poet, writer, and partisan leader
- Benediktas Mikulis – Lithuanian freedom fighter
- Antanas Mockus (1952–) – Lithuano-Colombian mathematician, philosopher, and politician; mayor of the city of Bogotá D.C. in two mandates (1995–1997 and 2001–2003)
- Vytautas Putna, also known as ru:Путна, Витовт Казимирович (1893–1937) – comcor (general lieutenant) of Red Army, Soviet military diplomat
- Shanina Shaik – model, maternally of Lithuanian-Australian descent
- Jokūbas Smuškevičius, also known as Yakov Smushkevich, Смушкевич Яков Владимирович (1902–1941) – general lieutenant of Soviet Army, Commander-in Chief of Soviet Air Force, twice Hero of Soviet Union
- Aleksandras Štromas (also referred to as Alexander Shtromas) (1931–1999) – professor of Bradford University, dissident
- Jeronimas Uborevičius also known as ru:Уборевич, Иероним Петрович or Ieronim Uborevich (1896–1937) – comandarm 1st rank (General of the Army) of the Red Army, commander of Armament of Red Army, later commander of military district
- Feliksas Vaitkus – sixth pilot to fly solo across the Atlantic
- Edita Vilkevičiūtė – model

== Fictional ==
- Hannibal Lecter – fictional cannibalistic genius appearing in four novels by author Thomas Harris and their film adaptations
- Lithuania – also known by his human name as Toris Laurinates, the representation of the country in the anime/manga Hetalia
- Marko Ramius (nicknamed the Vilnius Schoolmaster) – fictional captain of the submarine Red October in the 1984 novel The Hunt for Red October by Tom Clancy; portrayed by Sean Connery in the 1990 film version
- Jurgis Rudkus – protagonist of Upton Sinclair's 1904 novel The Jungle

== Notable international people of Lithuanian descent ==
- Tim Abromaitis – NCAA basketball player
- Saul Anuzis (1959–) – Chairman of the Michigan Republican State Committee (2005–present)
- Rick Barry – Hall of Fame basketball player
- Aras Baskauskas – winner of Survivor: Panama; of Lithuanian descent, holding Lithuanian and American citizenship
- Bernard Berenson – American art historian specializing in the Renaissance, born in Butrimonys (Alytus district, Lithuania)
- Kevin Bieksa – Canadian hockey player
- Sydney Brenner – biologist, winner of 2002 Nobel Prize in Physiology
- Robert Briscoe – Lord Mayor of Dublin – The original family name in Lithuania is believed have been Cherrick
- Charles Bronson – actor, born to Lithuanian emigrants
- Dick Butkus – NFL Hall of Fame linebacker
- Abraham Cahan (1860–1951) – Lithuanian-born American socialist activist, editor and journalist of socialist and Jewish periodicals (including The Jewish Daily Forward), and author of a number of fiction pieces concerning Yiddish life in New York
- Leonard Cohen (1934–2016) – singer-songwriter, poet, novelist, and Rock and Roll Hall of Fame inductee
- Dick Durbin – Illinois senator; mother was Lithuanian
- Bob Dylan – American folk/rock musician
- Brian Epstein – former Beatles manager; paternal grandparents are Lithuanian Jews
- Brandon Flowers (1981–) – vocalist, and keyboardist of the Las Vegas-based rock band The Killers. Is under both Scottish and Lithuanian ancestry
- Genie Francis – American actress; mother is of Lithuanian descent
- Romain Gary (Roman Kacew) (1914–1980) – Lithuanian born naturalized French diplomat, novelist, film director, World War II aviator; the only author to have won the Prix Goncourt twice (under his own name and under a pseudonym)
- Philip Glass (1937–) – composer (grandchild of Lithuanian Jewish migrants)
- Emma Goldman – anarchist, feminist, activist aka 'Red Emma', Lithuania-born anarchist known for her writings and speeches
- Nadine Gordimer – novelist and writer, winner of the 1991 Nobel Prize in Literature and 1974 Booker Prize
- Albin Gurklis – Lithuanian-American priest, mathematician
- Laurence Harvey – Lithuanian-born actor who achieved fame in British and American films
- Jascha Heifetz (1901–1987) – Lithuanian-born famous violinist
- Ann Jillian (1950–) – American television actress and breast cancer activist, born to immigrant parents
- Phill Jupitus – British comedian, family emigrated from Lithuania in 1917
- Joe Jurevicius – American football (NFL) wide receiver
- Natas Kaupas – professional skateboarder
- Anthony Kiedis (1962–) – frontman and vocalist of the Red Hot Chili Peppers (paternal grandfather of Lithuanian descent)
- Stanley Kunitz – noted American poet, mother was Lithuanian
- James Laurinaitis – NFL linebacker for the St. Louis Rams
- David Lee – physicist, winner of Nobel Prize in 1996 for physics
- Ruta Lee (1936–) born Ruta Kilmonis (Kilmonytė) – Canadian and American cinema and television actress
- Emmanuel Levinas – Lithuanian-born French philosopher and Talmudic commentator
- Jacques Lipchitz – Lithuanian-born cubist sculptor
- Billy McNeill – Scottish soccer legend, Lithuanian mother
- Hermann Minkowski – Lithuanian-born German mathematician, one of Einstein's teachers
- Antanas Mockus – Colombian mathematician, philosopher, and politician. Former mayor of Bogotá
- Simonas Morkūnas (1902–1997) – priest, Lithuanian-American humanitarian
- Ed Palubinskas – former basketball player
- Sean Penn – American actor; father was of mixed Russian and Lithuanian descent
- Vlado Perlemuter – French pianist, born in Kaunas
- Pink – pop, pop-rock, R&B singer-songwriter, dancer, producer
- Maury Povich – paternal grandparents emigrated from Lithuania
- Johnny Ramensky – legendary Scottish criminal and folk hero
- Andy Rautins – Canadian professional basketball player, son of Leo
- Leo Rautins – Canadian basketball player, former national team coach, broadcaster
- John C. Reilly – American actor; mother is of Lithuanian descent
- Phil Rudd (real name Phillip Hugh Norman Witschke Rudzevecuis) – drummer of band AC/DC
- Vyto Ruginis – American actor, son of Lithuanian immigrants
- Jack Sharkey – American heavyweight boxing champion
- William Shatner – Canadian actor, who played Captain James T. Kirk (one of the most iconic characters in American cultural history) on Star Trek, grandson of Lithuanian immigrants
- Joanna Shimkus – actress born in Canada to Lithuanian emigres
- John Shimkus – Illinois politician
- Jerry Siegel (1914–1996) – co-creator of Superman; son of Lithuanian Jewish immigrants
- Antanas Sileika – Canadian author
- Elijah ben Solomon, known as the Vilna Gaon – Lithuanian-born talmudist, halachist, kabbalist, and one of the foremost leaders of non-hasidic Jewry of the past few centuries
- Nik Stauskas – current NBA club Philadelphia 76ers player
- Annis Stukus – Canadian sports personality
- Jason Sudeikis – US actor and comedian, member of Saturday Night Live cast (paternal grandfather of Lithuanian descent)
- Olegas Truchanas (1923–1972) – Lithuanian-born Australian conservationist and nature photographer
- Johnny Unitas – football player with the Baltimore Colts, member of NFL Hall of Fame, parents were Lithuanian
- Eddie Waitkus – baseball player
- Uriel Weinreich (1926–1967) – Lithuanian-born linguist at Columbia University
- Mariel Zagunis – Olympic (USA) sabre fencing champion, gold medals in 2004 and 2008
- Robert Z'Dar – American actor
- Robert Zemeckis – American film director
- Annette Zilinskas – original bassist with the early Bangles
- William Zorach (1887–1966) – Lithuanian-born American sculptor, painter, printmaker and writer

== See also ==
- List of North European Jews
- List of Poles
- List of Belarusians
- List of people by nationality
