= Aloyzas Smilingis =

Lithuanian sculptor and painter

Aloyzas Smilingis (pseudonym Elis; born 1 January 1938) is a Lithuanian sculptor and painter. He is known for his large, monumental bronze and stone sculptures as well as abstract paintings. His artistic ideas often clashed with Soviet ideology, and his sculptures that decorate numerous cities in Lithuania. He lives and works near Vilnius, Lithuania.

== Biography ==
Smilingis was born in 1938, in the small Lithuanian town Plungė. His first formal art training was at 17 years old when he entered Vilnius Institute of Art, without any prior artistic training.

After the collapse of the Soviet Union, Smilingis visited museums in New York, Amsterdam, and London. He met with famous artists including Willem de Kooning.

In his seventies Elis mastered digital technology and started creating digital abstractions.

Artist resides and works in Lithuania. His art is owned by several Lithuanian museums, including Lithuanian Art Museum and Europos Parkas, and belongs to private collectors of Australia, Italy, United States, UK, Denmark, Netherlands, Germany, Sweden, Lithuania and Japan.

== Awards ==
- 2007 Lithuanian Artists Association Award for Painting, Lithuania
- 1992 Prize at the International Sculpture Quadrennial Riga’92, Latvia
- 1984 First Medal at the Sculpture Quadrennial, Riga, Latvia
- 1980 Prize at the Sculpture Quadrennial, Riga, Latvia

== Public art ==
- 1992 Holocaust Memorial in Alytus, Lithuania
- 1984 Outdoor sculpture, Panevėžys city park, Lithuania
- 1979 Outdoor sculpture, Klaipėda Sculpture Park, Lithuania
- 1977 Mural, hotel in the Northern Caucasus, Russia
