= Karosas =

- Lithuanian surname
- m.: Karosas
- f.: (unmarried): Karosaitė
- f.: (married): Karosienė

Karosas is a Lithuanian surname. The word literally means "carp". Notable people with the surname include:

- Alma Karosaitė (1945–2014), Lithuanian poetess
- Antanas Karosas (1856–1947), Lithuanian bishop and theologian
- Gintaras Karosas (born 1968), Lithuanian artist
- Juozas Karosas (1898–1981), Lithuanian composer, organist, conductor, choirmaster, and music pedagogue
- Justinas Karosas (1937, 2012), Lithuanian philosopher and politician, MP
- Tadas Karosas (born 1964), Lithuanian businessman and serial entrepreneur
