= Cantemus =

Lithuanian chamber choir

Cantemus is a Lithuanian chamber choir. It was founded in 1986 in Vilnius, Lithuania. Its first concert was held that same year on December 31 at St. Casimir's Church. In a short time the choir became winner of many competitions and was awarded the title of an "Exemplary Choir".

The choir is conducted by its founder, Laurynas Vakaris Lopas. The repertoire of the choir consists of about 300 items by over 100 composers.

Since 1988 the choir has participated in various international competitions of choral music and won awards and prizes: Béla Bartók's (Hungary), Tours (France), Tolosa (Spain), Arezzo (Italy), Gorizia (Italy), Tallinn (Estonia).

Cantemus is an active participant in the Church Choir Festivals in Marijampolė and Šiauliai, the vocal jazz festival in Panevėžys, the festival of modern Jewish music, the concerts of the music of Jeronimas Kačinskas, and many other musical events in Lithuania.

As of 2025 Cantemus remains active in performing in both Lithuania and across Europe.

== Recordings ==
- 1989 - Juozas Naujalis, "Motetai"
- 1996 - "Cantica sacra Lituanica"

== See also ==
- Music of Lithuania
