= Simonas Morkūnas =

Monsignor Simon Morkunas (Lithuanian Simonas Morkūnas) (1902–1997) was a priest in the Roman Catholic Church. He was born in Valtūnai, Lithuania on February 16, 1902, received his education at the Vytautas Magnus University in Kaunas, Lithuania, and was ordained to the priesthood in 1933.

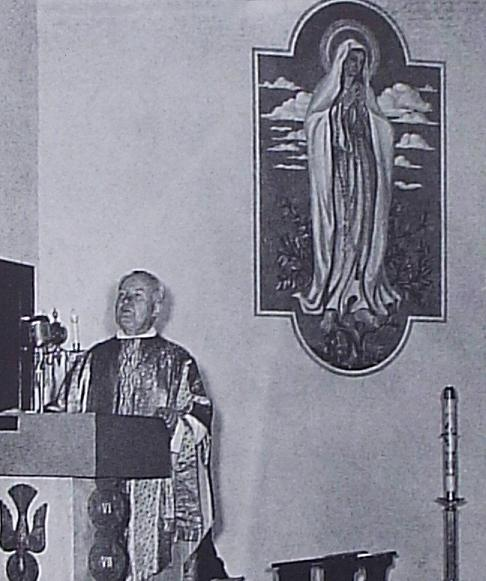
Msgr. Simon Morkunas, here shown preaching in St. Casimir's Church, Sioux City, Iowa ci. 1965.

Msgr. Morkunas is allegedly noted for his humanitarian and charity work in Lithuania, and for his contributions to easing the plights of displaced and oppressed people, both in Europe and in the United States. The people he aided during his early career included the poor, sick, and aged in Lithuania, where he was president of the Society of St. Vincent de Paul. During his tenure there, he established a nursing home and hospital, and provided education and care for hundreds of poor children in Kaunas. During the Nazi holocaust he sheltered Lithuanian Jews. After escaping the NKVD during the Soviet occupation in 1944, he ministered to the displaced Lithuanian community in Austria and Germany before emigrating to the United States in 1949. Morkunas remained a vocal anti-communist his entire adult life. He served as pastor and administrator of St. Casimir’s Church in Sioux City, Iowa for 39 years, retiring in 1990. At St. Casimir’s, he sponsored many Lithuanian immigrant families, while extensively adding to the spiritual, artistic, educational, and material well-being of the parish and greater community. He also maintained cordial relations with the Jewish community in Sioux City, many of whom had roots in Lithuania. It was at Fr. Morkunas’ invitation that the noted artist Adolfas Valeška decorated the sanctuary of St. Casimir's with original paintings, woodwork, and stained glass. In 1988, Pope John Paul II named Morkunas an Honorary Prelate of His Holiness, with the title of Monsignor. In 1991, he was awarded an honorary Doctor of Divinity by Morningside College in Sioux City, which recognized his “monumental services to Christianity and humanity as a Roman Catholic clergyman. His steady commitment to education, in his home country, Lithuania, and his adopted country, the United States of America, adds special luster to his career.”

He died on July 5, 1997, at the age of 95.
