= Smith Museum of Stained Glass Windows =

Former museum in Chicago, Illinois

Coordinates: 41°53′29.2″N 87°36′4.8″W

- Established: 2000
- Dissolved: 2014
- Location: Navy Pier, Chicago, Illinois

The Smith Museum of Stained Glass Windows was an exhibition that opened in February 2000 at Chicago’s Navy Pier entertainment complex. It permanently closed in October 2014. It was the first American museum dedicated solely to the art of stained glass windows.

Named after prominent Chicago collectors E.B. and Maureen Smith, the museum held over 150 individual pieces displayed in four galleries: Victorian, Prairie, Modern, and Contemporary. The majority of the works originally came from Chicago-area buildings, and a number of prominent artists are represented, including John LaFarge, Adolfas Valeška, and Ed Paschke. The collection contained religious themes, secular work, and some more unusual items, including a stained glass portrait of basketball player Michael Jordan, a window created from glass soda bottles, and Marie Herndl's "Queen of the Elves" (also called "The Fairy Queen").

The adjacent Richard H. Driehaus Gallery of Stained Glass Windows opened in 2001 and closed in September 2017. It was devoted to ecclesiastical and secular windows by Louis Comfort Tiffany and interrelated businesses between 1890 and 1930. The windows were from the extensive Tiffany collection of Chicago businessman Richard H. Driehaus. There were 11 Tiffany windows on display in the Driehaus Gallery, along with a Tiffany Studios fire screen.

The museum was located along a strip of shops, theatres, and restaurants, and admission was free. Most of the windows in the museum were illuminated with artificial light to highlight the colors and intricate details. Since each piece was protected by a layer of bulletproof glass, patrons were encouraged to come close to the works and even bring food into the galleries. Curator Rolf Achilles said, "It’s one of the very few museums in the world you can stroll through eating an ice cream cone right in front of the art. We don’t keep people away". In December 2013, less than a year before its closure, the museum installed 22 stained glass windows in the Chicago Pedway in collaboration with Macy's; these remain on display.
