= Adolfas Valeška =

Lithuanian artist (1905–1994)

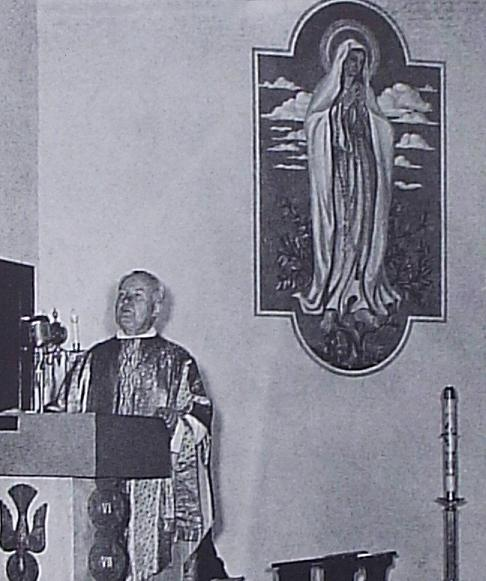
A painting by Adolfas Valeška of Our Lady of Fatima is seen behind the late Msgr. Simon Morkunas, here shown preaching from a pulpit also designed by Valeška, in St. Casimir's Church, Sioux City, Iowa circa 1965.

Another view of Our Lady of Fatima by Valeška, which now resides at Trinity Heights Shrine in Sioux City, Iowa.

Adolfas Valeška (15 March 1905 in Kybartai – 11 May 1994 in Kaunas, Lithuania) was a Lithuanian stained glass artist, painter, stage designer, and museum director who worked in Lithuania and in Chicago, Illinois.

== Background ==
Valeška graduated from the Kaunas Art School in 1928. He then began work as a church decorator, moving on to co-found a museum of religious art in Kaunas. From 1939 to 1944, he served as director of the Vilnius Art Museum. During this period, his work was exhibited in a number of venues, including the International Exhibition of Decorative Arts in Paris, 1935; the International Press Exhibition at the Vatican, 1935; and the International Exhibition of Decorative Arts in Berlin, 1937, where he earned a medal for designing the Lithuanian Pavilion.

Anticipating the Soviet occupation of Lithuania at the end of World War II, in 1944, he emigrated first to West Germany and then to the United States, where he established a studio in Chicago. He designed and executed a number of stained glass works and mosaics, as well as acting as stage designer for the Lithuanian Opera Company of Chicago.

== Notable works ==
Valeska's work includes:

- Mosaics and stained glass at St. Philomena's Church in Chicago
- Stained glass windows at O'Hare Airport, Chicago
- Stained glass windows at Congregation Rodfei Zedek in Chicago
- Stained glass windows at the former Marshall Field's, Chicago
- Stained glass at Holy Cross Church, Dayton, Ohio
- Four oil paintings that depict scenes from Lithuanian and American history at Holy Cross Church in Chicago.
- Freestanding windows, part of an ongoing exhibition at the Smith Museum of Stained Glass, Navy Pier, Chicago
- Stained glass, pulpit, and paintings at St. Casimir Lithuanian Roman Catholic Church in Sioux City, Iowa.

== Later Years ==
After Lithuania regained its independence in 1990, he returned to the country of his birth, where he died at the age of 89 in 1994.

== Sources ==
- "Valeška". Encyclopedia Lituanica VI: 44-45. (1970–1978). Ed. Simas Sužiedėlis. Boston, Massachusetts: Juozas Kapočius. LCCN 74-114275.
