= Irma Kliauzaitė =

Lithuanian pianist settled in Austria

Irma Kliauzaitė (also known as Irma Kliauzaitė-Franc) is a Lithuanian pianist settled in Austria. She has performed internationally. Kliauzaite graduated in the Salzburg's Mozarteum in 1996, and was decorated the Mozarteum Foundation's Bernhard Paumgartner-Medal. She has also been awarded the Bösendorfer Prize.

== Life ==
Kliauzaitė was born in Lithuania. She studied piano at the Mozarteum in Salzburg, graduating in 1996, under Professors Peter Lang and Alexei Lubimov. She was awarded the Mozarteum Foundation's Bernhard Paumgartner Medal. She has also been awarded the Bösendorfer Prize.

Kliauzaitė has taken master classes from a number of notable teachers, including Lazar Berman, Dimitri Bashkirov, Germaine Mounier, Aldona Dvarionaite, Lev Wlasenko and Barbara Hesse-Bukovska. She teaches at the Mozarteum.

In 1999 she won first place in the Salzburg International Mozart Competition (Internationaler Mozartwettbewerb Salzburg). Later that year she played at the inaugural “Nel nome di Mozart” (In the name of Mozart) festival in Milan, led by Romolo Gessi.

Kliauzaitė took second prize in the I International M.K. Čiurlionis Piano and Organ Competition in 1992, but won the special prize for the best interpretation of Čiurlionis' works.

In May 2021 Kliauzaitė performed at the jubilee Thomas Mann Festival in Nidau. The performance had been postponed from the previous year due to COVID-19 restrictions. Kliauzaitė performed with South Korean violinist Wonji Kim-Ozim, and their programme included Dvořák's Romantic Pieces, Op. 75, Janáček’s Sonata for Violin and Piano, and Saint-Saëns’ “Havanaise”, Op. 83. A reviewer described the pair as “Kliauzaitė is a very reliable partner, a stable foundation for an equal duet, on which the music of violinist W. Kim-Ozim revealed itself extremely beautifully”.

Record of piano prizes
Year	Competition	Prize	Ex-aequo with...	1st prize winner
1991	(Lithuania) VII Mikalojus Konstantinas Čiurlionis, Vilnius	2nd prize		(Israel) Ohad Ben-Ari
1999	(Austria) VII Wolfgang A. Mozart, Salzburg	1st prize		
