= Albin Gurklis =

American mathematician

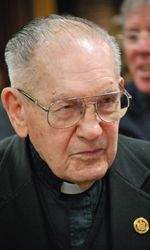
- Born: Albin J. Gurklis; March 16, 1918; Waterbury, Connecticut
- Died: October 31, 2008 (aged 90); Putnam, Connecticut
- Education: Marianapolis College; Marquette University
- Occupations: Priest, Mathematician

Albin J. Gurklis (March 16, 1918 – October 31, 2008) was a member of the Order of the Marians of the Immaculate Conception and a mathematics teacher at Marianapolis Preparatory School in Connecticut, United States.

== Early life ==
Albin J. Gurklis was born on March 16, 1918, to Dominick and Barbara Gurklis in a small home in Waterbury, Connecticut in a Lithuanian-speaking family.

== College ==
He was ordained a priest at Marianapolis College, now Marianapolis Preparatory School on August 8, 1943. After being admitted to the order of the Marians of the Immaculate Conception, Gurklis completed his fourth year of theology at Marianapolis. He then proceeded to the Marian Hills Seminary in Clarendon Hills, Illinois, to complete his training. Now with the title M.I.C., he was admitted to Marquette University in Wisconsin attaining an M.S. in Mathematics in 1950 while completing a thesis paper on the Hexagramma Mysticum.

== Marianapolis years ==
After a brief period of ministry at Marian parishes across the US, Father Gurklis returned to Marianapolis to teach mathematics for the next 58 years and held the position of department chair for several years. He also served as Assistant Headmaster at Marianapolis as well as dorm prefect and house secretary. In January 2008, he retired at the age of 90 due to eye complications.

== Death ==
He had a heart attack on the night of October 30, 2008, and died a few hours later on the morning of Halloween. He is buried at the Marian cemetery in Stockbridge, Massachusetts.
