= Aldona Lukoševičiūtė =

Lithuanian cardiologist, inventor (1929–2016)

Aldona Lukoševičiūtė (22 April 1929 in Kaunas – 16 December 2016 in Kaunas) was a Lithuanian cardiologist and habilitated doctor of biomedical sciences who is considered a pioneer of resuscitation and intensive therapy and specialized cardiology. She was also the inventor of clinical defibrillation and stimulation methods.

== Biography ==
Born in Kaunas, Lithuania, Lukoševičiūtė graduated from Kaunas Institute of Medicine in 1954 as a physician. In 1968, she received her Habilitation for Doctor of Medical Sciences.

From 1954 to 1957, she was a Clinical Resident at the Department of Hospital Therapy of Kaunas Medical Institute (now the Lithuanian University of Health Sciences) and from 1956 to 1958, she served as department head of the Department of Internal Medicine of the Kaunas Republican Clinical Hospital. She was named Head of the Cardiology Department in 1958 and stayed there until 1965. Beginning in 1971, she held a variety of positions in medical institutes in Kaunas and from 1991 to 2001 she was named an Expert Member of the Lithuanian Academy of Sciences.

=== Achievements ===
Lukoševičiūtė became known in Lithuania for her use of indirect heart massage and transthoracic electrical cardiac defibrillation for heart resuscitation. Her innovations included the introduction of phonocardiography, transesophageal electrocardiography, treatment of heart rhythm disorders with antiarrhythmic drugs and pulsed electric current, and transesophageal cardiac defibrillation. She also improved and successfully used transesophageal cardiac pacing.

In 1963, she was the first person in Lithuania to successfully revive a patient after an apparent cardiac arrest.

"On the morning of 23 March 1963, during a doctor's visit to the cardiology department, a patient, Dr. Zofija Danilevičienė from Kėdainiai, suddenly experienced clinical death. When Dr. D. Vilkansiene began to provide first aid, the head of the department, A. Lukoševičiūtė, who learned about this, quickly brought a defibrillator placed on a medicine cart and, convinced that a heart attack had occurred, immediately performed defibrillation in the anteroposterior position of the electrodes. One impulse was enough and the patient's heart started beating again, breathing appeared and consciousness returned. This was the first case in Lithuania and the USSR when transthoracic cardiac defibrillation was performed successfully."

She began her teaching career in 1971 as a lecturer at the Department of Hospital Therapy at the Lithuanian Medical University. Her first title was associate professor, but in time she rose to become a full professor and head of the Clinic of Anesthesiology and Intensive Care.

According to Stirbys: "... the professor's cardiological knowledge was unparalleled. You could say it was a phenomenon. The direct beneficiaries of her knowledge, comprehensive orientation and competence were seriously ill patients in cardiological intensive care. The permanent consultant of this unit was Prof. A. Lukoševičiūtė."

She published more than 400 scientific articles.

Lukoševičiūtė retired in 2001 and died 16 December 2016 in Kaunas. She was buried in the Romainiai I cemetery.

=== Honors ===
- On 5 November 1970, the USSR State Prize was awarded to AA Vishnevsky, BM Zukerman, AJ Smailis, AJ Lukoševičiūtė, NL Gurvičius and VA Negovskis for the development and implementation of the electropulse method in clinical practice.
