= Valtūnai =

- Village
- Location of Valtūnai
- Coordinates: 55°17′31″N 24°56′31″E
- Country: Lithuania
- County: Vilnius County
- Municipality: Ukmergė district municipality
- Eldership: Žemaitkiemis eldership

Population (2011)
  - Total: 20
- Time zone: UTC+2 (EET)
  - Summer (DST): UTC+3 (EEST)

Valtūnai is a village in Lithuania, Ukmergė district municipality, on the right bank of the Siesartis River. It is located in a region of lakes, forests, and rolling hills. According to the Lithuanian census of 2011, it had 20 residents.
