= Jonas Zdanys =

American poet

Jonas Zdanys (born July 30, 1950) is a bilingual poet, a leading translator of modern Lithuanian fiction and poetry into the English language., and a literary theorist whose writings on translation theory reinforce a traditional/new critical, humanistic literary agenda. He was born in New Britain, Connecticut, in 1950, a few months after his parents arrived in the United States from a United Nations camp for Lithuanian refugees. He is an honors graduate of Yale University and earned a Ph.D. in English literature from the State University of New York at Buffalo, where he studied with Robert Creeley among other writers.

== Background ==
Zdanys is the author of fifty-seven books. Fifty of them are collections of his own poetry, written in English or in Lithuanian, and of his translations of Lithuanian poetry and prose into English. His Lithuanian language poetry has been described as the product and result of his effort to bring to Lithuanian letters a modern, multidimensional-chaotic consciousness.

Zdanys is also active as a literary editor and has served as General Editor of Lituanus, The Lithuanian Quarterly Journal of Arts and Sciences (1976–1996); a Member of the Editorial Board of PEN of Lithuania; Consulting Editor of Contemporary East European Poetry; and a Reader for the Creative Writing Fellowship Program of the National Endowment for the Arts.

He held administrative and faculty positions at Yale University from 1980 to 1998, where he began and taught the poetry translation workshop, and served as the State of Connecticut's Chief Academic Officer and as Associate Commissioner of Higher Education (1998–2009). He was a tenured full Professor of English and Director of the program in Creative Writing from 2009-2021 at Sacred Heart University. He serves currently as Poet in Residence and Professor Emeritus of English at Sacred Heart University.

== Awards ==
Zdanys has received a number of prizes and book awards for his own poetry and for his translations of Lithuanian poetry, including Lithuania’s Jotvingiai Prize, a major Lithuanian prize for poetry awarded by the Lithuanian Ministry of Culture. He was awarded the prize for his collection of poetry, written in Lithuanian, Dūmų Stulpai (Pillars of Smoke), published in May 2002 by the Lithuanian Writers Union Publishing House. Zdanys was recognized, too, for two additional books published that year: Five Lithuanian Women Poets, his translation into English of poems by Lithuania’s leading women poets, and Inclusions in Time, his translation into English of poems by Lithuanian poet Antanas A. Jonynas.

Zdanys was nominated in 2023 for the Lithuanian National Prize in culture and the Arts, and was honored with an exhibition about his life and literary work by the National Library of Lithuania on the occasion of his sixtieth birthday: He has also been awarded the Lithuanian Writers Union Prize for Translation in 1996 for his book Four Poets of Lithuania; the Lithuanian Writers’ Society Prize for Best Book of the Year in 1994 for Aušros Daina (Aurora’s Song), a volume of his poetry in Lithuanian; and the Phillips Poetry Award and the Weinstein Memorial Creative Writing Award for his English-language poems. He also was selected as Finalist for the Ohio State University Press/The Journal Award in Poetry for Water Light, a volume of his selected poems. Zdanys has also received various grants in support of his literary work, among them awards from the Connecticut Commission on the Arts, the International Research and Exchanges Board with support from the National Endowment for the Humanities, the Council on Russian and East European Studies of the Yale Center for International and Area Studies, Lietuviškos Knygos/Books From Lithuania, and the Lithuanian Ministry of Culture.

== Published works ==
=== Poetry ===
- Išeivystės fragmentai (Vilnius: Baziliskas, 2025)
  - The Mirror at the Top of the Stairs (Brooklyn: Black Spruce Press 2023).
- Early Poems 1966-1969 (Brooklyn: Black Spruce Press 2020).
- The Angled Road: Collected Poems 1970-2020. (Beaumont: Lamar University Literary Press 2020).
- Notebook Sketches. (Chicago: Virtual Artists Collective 2019).
- Three White Horses. With paintings by Sou Vai Keng. (Beaumont: Lamar University Literary Press 2017).
- Two Voices / Du balsai. Poems and Translations. With Kornelijus Platelis. (Chicago: Purple Flag Press 2017).
- St. Brigid's Well. (Chicago: Purple Flag Press 2017).
- Preliudai Po Lietaus/Preludes After Rain. (Macao, China & Markwell, Australia: Flying Island Books, ASM, and Cerberus Press 2017).
- Red Stones. With paintings by Steven Schroeder. (Beaumont: Lamar University Literary Press 2016).
- Ikaro Prisikėlimas. (Vilnius: Lietuvos Rašytojų Sajungos Leidykla 2014).
- Cormorants. (Boston: Timberline Press 2013).
- The Kingfisher's Reign. (Chicago: Virtual Artists Collective 2012).
- The Thin Light of Winter. New and Selected Poems. (Chicago: Virtual Artists Collective 2009).
- Tarpdury. (Vilnius: Lietuvos Rašytojų Sajungos Leidykla 2008).
- Salt. (Chicago: Virtual Artists Collective 2007)
- The Woman on the Bridge. (Chicago: Virtual Artists Collective 2005)
- The White City. (New Haven: Branford College Press and Jonathan Edwards College Press of Yale University, 2004). Illustrated and hand-printed by Kristina Zdanys.
- White. (New Haven: The White Birch Press, 2004)
- Dūmų stulpai. (Vilnius: Lietuvos Rašytojų Sajungos Leidykla 2002).
- Lithuanian Crossing. (New Haven: The White Birch Press, 1999).
- Dotnuvos stoty. (Vilnius: Vaga Publishers Ltd. 1999)
- Water Light. (Vilnius: Vaga Publishers Ltd. 1997).
- The White Bend of the River. Drawings by Mykolas Malkovas. (New Haven: Patrick Schrieber, 1994).
- The Metaphysics of Wolves. Drawings by Mykolas Malkovas. (New Haven: The White Birch Press 1994).
- Aušros Daina. (Kaunas: Spindulys/Santara 1993).
- Maine Aubade. (Newington, Connecticut: Appletree Chapbooks 1990).
- Voice on an Anthill. (New York: Manyland Books 1982).

=== Translations ===
- Alternating Masks: Selected Poems of Kornelijus Platelis. (Brooklyn: Black Spruce Press 2021).
- Invocations of Light: Poems by Valdas Ausra. (Brooklyn: Grey Willow Press 2020).
- Solitary Architectures: Selected Poems of Kornelijus Platelis. (Beaumont: Lamar University Press 2014).
- Agnė Žagrakalytė: Artistic Cloning. (Chicago: Virtual Artists Collective 2010).
- Kornelijus Platelis: Haiku. (New Haven: Pierson College Press of Yale University 2007).
- Icchokas Meras: Stalemate. Revised edition. (New York: Other Press 2005). Original edition was published in 1980: Icchokas Meras: Stalemate. (New York: Lyle Stuart; Toronto: General Publishing Co.; Tel Aviv: Michaelmark Books 1980).
- Emptiness: Poems by Vytautas P. Bložė. (Vilnius: Vario Burnos 2005)
- Zones: Poems by Kornelijus Platelis. (Chicago: Virtual Artists Collective 2004)
- Five Lithuanian Women Poets. (Vilnius: Vaga Publishers Ltd 2002)
- Inclusions in Time: Selected Poems by Antanas A. Jonynas. (Vilnius: Lietuvos Rašytojų Sajungos Leidykla 2002)
- Silk: Poems by Nijole Miliauskaite. (Vilnius: Vario Burnos 2002)
- @ and Other Poems by Kornelijus Platelis. (Vilnius: Vario Burnos 2002).
- Snare for the Wind: Selected Poems of Kornelijus Platelis. (Vilnius: Vaga Publishers Ltd. 1999).
- The Theology of Rain: Selected Poems of Alfonsas Nyka-Niliūnas. (Vilnius: Vaga Publishers Ltd and Lithuanian PEN 1999)
- Smoke From Nothing: Poems by Vytautas P. Bložė. (Philadelphia: The Pine Press 1998).
- Four Poets of Lithuania: Vytautas P. Bložė, Sigitas Geda, Nijolė Miliauskaitė, Kornelijus Platelis. (Vilnius: Vaga Publishers Ltd. 1995).
- Chimeras in the Tower: Selected Poems of Henrikas Radauskas. (Middletown: Wesleyan University Press 1986). Recorded, Talking Books for the Blind 1988.
- Leonardas Andriekus: Eternal Dream. (New York: Franciscan Fathers Press and Manyland Books 1980).
- Icchokas Meras: Stalemate. (New York: Lyle Stuart; Toronto: General Publishing Co.; Tel Aviv: Michaelmark Books 1980).
- Sigitas Geda: Songs of Autumn. (Pittsburgh: The Slow Loris Press 1979).
- Selected Post-war Lithuanian Poetry. (New York: Manyland Books 1979).
- Bronė Martin: Reality and Dream. & Bronė Martin: The Wandering Seagull. (Privately printed).
- Jurgis Gliauda: Agony. (New York: Manyland Books 1977).

== Other books ==
- weaving Shade: Contemporary Dream Poetry,An International Anthology. Editor. (Beaumont: Lamar University Literary Press 2026).
- Contemporary Surrealist and Magical Realist Poetry, An International Anthology. Editor. (Beaumont: Lamar University Literary Press 2022).
- Unlocking the Word: An Anthology of Found Poetry. Editor. (Beaumont: Lamar University Literary Press 2018).
- Pushing the Envelope: Epistolary Poems. Editor. (Beaumont: Lamar University Press 2015).
- Yale 1972: Twenty-five Years Out. Editor. (New Haven: Yale University 1997). & Yale 1972: Twenty-Five Years Out, A Supplement . Editor. (New Haven: Yale University 1997).
- True Fellowship in All Its Glory: Remembrances of C.S.P. Editor. (New Haven: Kingsley Trust Association 1992).

Zdanys is also the author of some forty articles and papers, mostly on various topics on Lithuanian literature and translation theory.
