= Viktoras Starošas =

Lithuanian director, cinematographer and writer

Viktoras Starošas (June 12, 1921 in Kaunas – August 22, 2016) was a Lithuanian director, cinematographer and writer.

At the beginning of Lithuanian cinema, he worked as an assistant in the company, "Mūsų Lietuva" (Our Lithuania). There, he also filmed newsreels, the first post-war Lithuanian documentaries since 1952. He began directing his "Soviet Lithuania" newsreels, recording the ongoing changes in Lithuanian society. In 1965, the director created a full-length documentary film, "Jai - dvidešimt penkeri" (She is Twenty-Five).

Over his career, Starošas made many Lithuanian documentaries; a number targeted Soviet taboos, displaying the abuses and questioning the morality of the Soviets. This can especially be seen in movies such as "Aš myliu direktorę" (I love the Director, 1978) and "Juoda - greta" (Black - Greta, 1977), based upon young criminals. Another topic, to which he often returned, was foreign countries, including: "Jambo Tanzania" (1974), "Ne vien šokio ritme" (Is not just a dance rhythm, 1979), and stories about foreign Lithuanians Lietuviska Amerika (Lithuanian America, 1970).

However, the best known projects Starošas has worked on are mainly sports festival shows, including: "Žirgai ir berniukai" (Horses and Boys, 1968), "Du kėliniai" (Two Trousers, 1969), "Kur karalienės auksas?" (Where Is the Queen's Gold?, directed with R. Šilinis, 1972), "Maratonas balne" (Marathon in the Saddle, directed with A. Jančor, 1973), "Aukso karštligė" (Gold Rush, directed with F. Kauzon, 1983), "Citius, fortius ir... aritmetika" (1985).

Starošas was given the opportunity to participate in the Soviet filmmakers group in the Olympics in Moscow (1980).
