= Klaipėda Sculpture Park =

- Martynas Mažvydas Sculpture Park
- lt/Klaipėdos skulptūrų parkas (Martyno Mažvydo skulptūrų parkas)
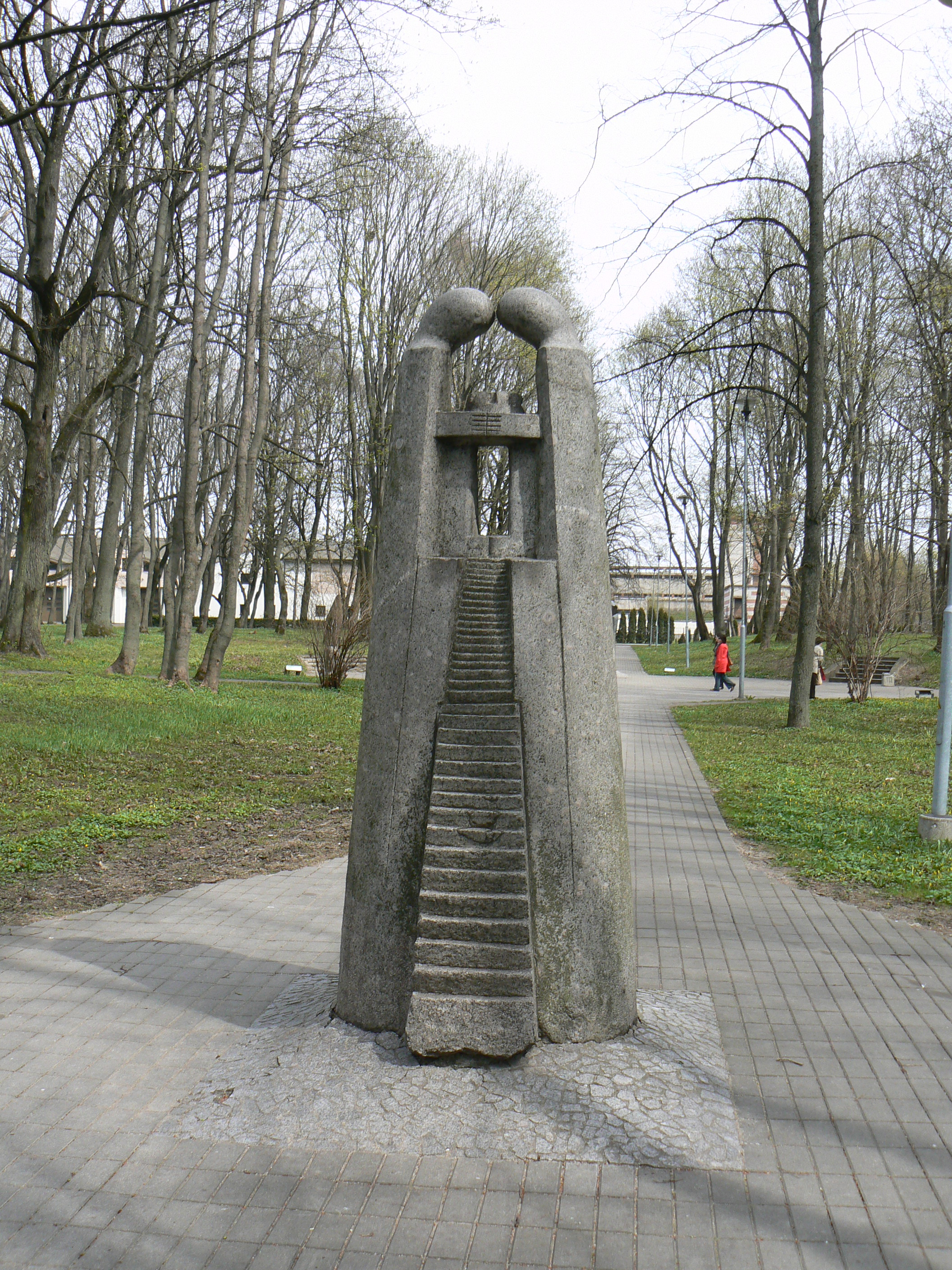
- Interactive map of Klaipėda Sculpture Park
- Location: Between K. Donelaičio, Liepų, Trilapio and S. Daukanto Streets, Klaipėda, Lithuania
- Area: 12.2 hectares (30 acres)
- Created: 1977
- Operator: History Museum of Lithuania Minor
- Open: 24/7
- Website: http://www.mlimuziejus.lt/park/en/

Klaipėda Sculpture Park (also known as Martynas Mažvydas Sculpture Park) is located in central Klaipėda, Lithuania. This park is one of the key artistic landmarks in the town. The L-shaped park occupies 12.2 hectares and has 116 modern sculptures created by 67 Lithuanian artists in 1977–1991. QR codes have been fixed to the sculpture plaques, giving extra info after waving a phone next to them.

In 1820–1959, here was the Memel Central Cemetery (German: Memel Städtischer Friedhof). Over 40,000 people are buried there. Some graves are marked by tombstones to this day.

Since 2006, the History Museum of Lithuania Minor is responsible for maintenance of the park.
