= Mykolas Natalevičius =

Mykolas Natalevičius (born 1985 in Vilnius, Lithuania) is a Lithuanian composer.

== Biography ==
From 2005 to 2011 he studied composition with Vytautas Barkauskas and Ričardas Kabelis) at the Lithuanian Academy of Music and Theatre. In 2010 he studied at the Danish Institute of Electronic Music with Henrik Munch. He also attended singing class at the Royal Academy of Music in Aarhus with Ingrid Haking Raby. Mykolas Natalevičius is active as a composer, singer (bass), pianist and conductor. His work for musical theater, drama performances and films received numerous awards in competitions and festivals in Lithuania and abroad. He served as chairman of the Lithuanian Composers’ Union from 2017 to 2025. He is an associate professor at the Lithuanian Academy of Music and Theater, and since 2025, he has been the head of the Composition Department.

== Style ==
Music of Mykolas Natalevičius could be divided into two parts: the music of ‘new spirituality’ and experimental electronics, which is often combined with various expressions of human voice. The first creative tendency springs from the straightforward and fundamental relation of the composer towards religion and is represented by choral works with Latin texts, homophonic texture and tonal harmony, sometimes resembling Palestrinian choral writing. Another side of Mykolas Natalevičius music is disclosed in, for example, short operas distinguished for their borderline sonic experiences, radically reduced musical material and expressive recitation of the soloists.
