= St. Casimir Lithuanian Roman Catholic Church =

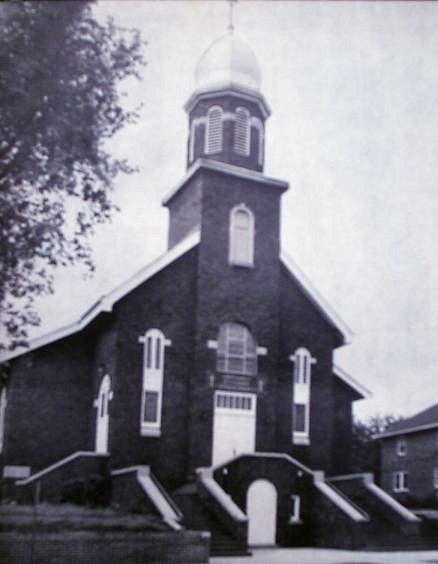
St. Casimir Church c. 1965, featuring the distinctive bell-cast dome

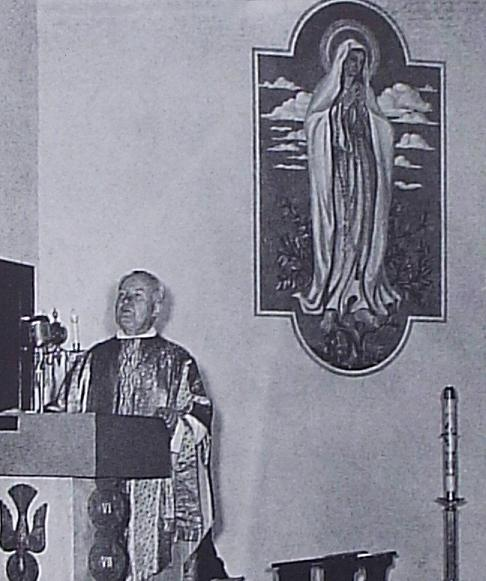
The painting of Our Lady of Fatima is seen behind the late Msgr. Simon Morkunas, here preaching from a pulpit designed by Adolfas Valeška.

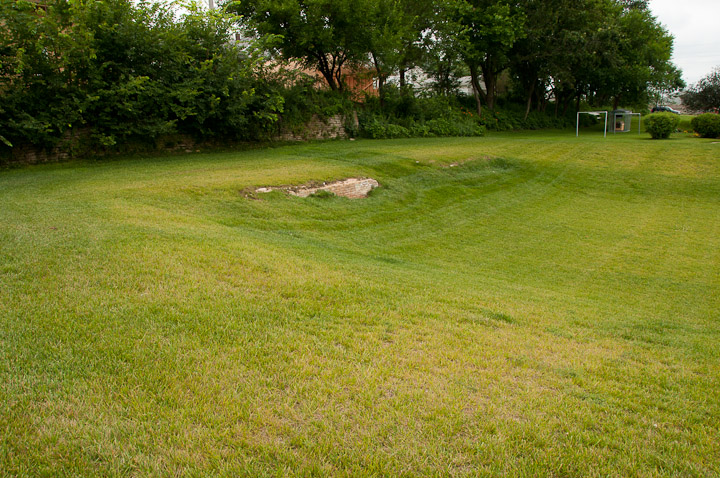
The empty field is all that remains of the church

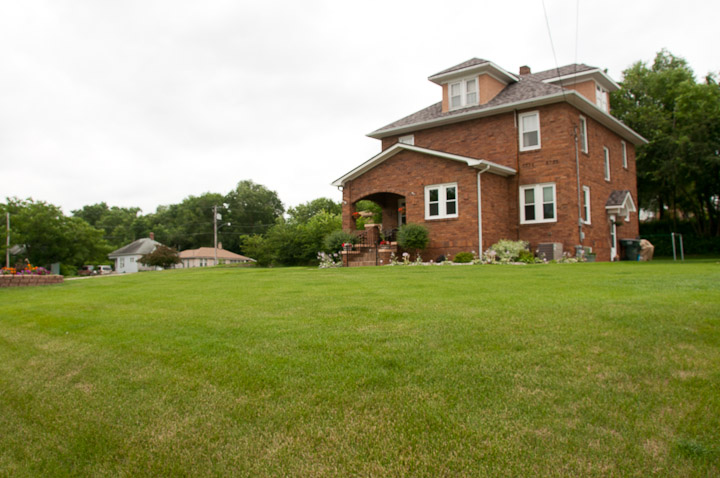
View including what was once the church rectory

St. Casimir Lithuanian Roman Catholic Church was a church in Sioux City, Iowa. Sioux City was the second westernmost city in the world to have a Lithuanian church (after Los Angeles). Designed by the architect William L. Steele and built in 1915, the church was demolished in 2007.

== History ==
It was built by the Lithuanian immigrant community of Sioux City in 1915, and served as a neighborhood parish until 1998. Although it was founded as an ethnic parish, members have included Roman Catholics of diverse backgrounds, including Irish, Polish, Italian, and Mexican. The location near the stockyards and meat packing industrial area of the city attracted many of its working-class neighbors. However, during the 1990s, the Diocese of Sioux City forbade St. Casimir parish from enrolling any new members. Then, in 1998 the diocese dissolved the parish, appropriating all holdings and instructing parishioners to join other active parishes. The building, which was deemed eligible for the National Register of Historic Places, was emptied of the fixtures, artwork, and stained glass and left vacant. In May 2007, the diocese made public a plan to raze the structure due to safety concerns. Private interests arranged for the unique dome to be salvaged. The demolition was completed on 17 July 2007.

== Architecture ==
The building was designed by the Prairie School architect William L. Steele, and built by Babue and Co. It incorporated a simplified neo-Gothic exterior design, along with a distinctive "bell-cast" dome (cupola) atop the steeple. The interior was extensively decorated by the Lithuanian artist Adolfas Valeška in the early 1950s, including woodwork, a pulpit, stained glass, and several large paintings, among them Our Lady of Fatima, the Good Shepherd, and the Assumption of Mary. Our Lady of Fatima and the Good Shepherd now reside in St. Joseph Center at the Trinity Heights Marian shrine in Sioux City, along with the European bisque statue of the patron, Saint Casimir, all of which were purchased back from an antiques dealer after having been salvaged from the sanctuary. Other artifacts were hand-picked by the diocese for placement in the newly renovated Cathedral of the Epiphany and Mater Dei grade school.

== Former pastors ==
- Fr. Michael Cybulskis 1915–1917
- Fr. Joseph Gricius 1917
- Fr. John Aleknavicius 1918–1919
- Fr. Michael Kolvek 1919–1922
- Fr. George G. M. Cesna 1922–1951
- Msgr. Simon Morkunas 1951–1990
- Fr. Marvin J. Boes 1990–1995
- Fr. Paul-Louis Arts 1995–1998
