= Joe Fine =

American politician

Mayor of Marquette
- In office April 13, 1964 – 1965
- Preceded by: Fred Rydholm

Marquette City Commissioner
- In office April 11, 1961 – 1965

Personal details
- Born: June 13, 1895 Lithuania
- Died: October 4, 1969 (aged 74) Marquette, Michigan, United States
- Occupation: Businessman

Joseph Fine (June 13, 1895 – October 4, 1969) was a businessman and politician in Marquette, Michigan. Born in Lithuania, Fine became a citizen of the United States and lived most of his life in Marquette. In the 1960s he was active in city politics. Offices he held included mayor, city commissioner, and member of the Board of Light and Power. His legacy includes Marquette's Board of Light and Power, which operates a municipal power station for the city. Over a period of more than 40 years he ran a series of businesses in Marquette. The most notable was a popular but unusual tavern. One of the unusual aspects was that women were not welcome, which helped minimize disputes among patrons. At the time of his death, a local newspaper referred to him as "one of the city's best known merchants." He was also active in or supported a number of fraternal, religious, and other civic organizations.

== Early life ==
Fine was born June 13, 1895, in the Russian Empire. In 1913, he immigrated to the United States, settled in Boston, Massachusetts, and worked in a factory. In 1916, he moved to Marquette, Michigan where his brother Samuel "Sam" Fine and uncle Abraham "Abe" Fine lived. Joe Fine joined the United States Army during World War I and served from 1918 to 1919. The war ended before he was deployed to Europe. His service helped him earn his United States citizenship.

== Family ==
In 1933 Fine married Ruth Wolfe. The couple's first child, Bernard, was born in 1935. Their second child, Lithia, was born in 1938.

== Business activities ==
At the time of his death, a local newspaper characterized Fine as "one of the city's best known merchants." He operated businesses in Marquette for more than 40 years.

One of Fine's first jobs after moving to Marquette was working with Sam in a slaughterhouse owned by Abe. Starting in the mid-1920s, Fine and Sam operated a grocery store.

In 1934 Fine left the grocery business, purchased a tavern in downtown Marquette, and renamed it "Joe's Tavern." A newspaper advertisement from that year included the following:

Blatz ... on tap for the first time in Marquette ... 5 cents a glass. Beer and lunches served in a tavern atmosphere. Booths and tables for ladies and men. A nice place to stop when you are out for a drive.

Around the time of World War II, Fine discontinued meals and made other significant changes to the way he operated the Tavern. By the 1950s, Joe's Tavern was unusual enough to attract the attention of a major newspaper in Detroit, Michigan, more than 400 miles away. One of the most unusual features of the Tavern was that women were not welcome. This helped prevent conflicts in the Tavern. Fine was quoted, "This way we get along pretty good." Another unusual aspect of the Tavern was that it was only open from 7 a.m. to 7 pm. Opening early allowed workers from the night shift to get some drinks before heading home. Commenting on the early closing time Fine said, "If a fellow decides to stay out late, his wife knows he's not here. And this way the bartenders and I get a chance to get home for dinner, too." Fine also provided only a few chairs in the bar, intended for those who were old or infirm. With most patrons standing, the bartenders could more easily identify the unsteady people who had imbibed too much. Yet, these unusual characteristics did not detract from business. With low prices, a strong sense of camaraderie, and dedicated bar staff, Joe's Tavern was a popular place. Typically its 57-foot bar was busy with both blue- and white-collar customers.

In 1962, Fine sold the Tavern. But he could not remain inactive for long. During the remainder of his life he operated a series of businesses in Marquette, including a newsstand, cigar stand, hobby shop, and another bar.

== Public offices ==
In 1961 Fine entered city politics, running for Marquette city commissioner. He was re-elected to another two-year term in 1963. In 1964, the commissioners voted Fine the mayor. Fine simultaneously served on the Marquette County Board of Supervisors.

Fine was instrumental in the formation of the Marquette Board of Light and Power, which operates the city's municipal power plant. He was also elected a charter member of the Board and upon re-election served as the Board's chairman.

Regarding Fine's public service, a local paper stated the following:

When he ran for office it was always for an ideal and with a view to service, not for personal gain. He never accepted open support from groups or individuals. 'If I can't win on my own I don't want to,' he'd say. Yet Joe Fine always won any election he entered. In fact, he always ran first in the field.

== Other civic activities ==
Fine was also active in or supported a number of religious, fraternal, and other civic organizations. During 1952–1953 he participated in the formation of the first Jewish temple in the area. Despite being Jewish, he also supported local churches. When asked about that he said, "I figure as long as I am able to give something to help build a church—any kind of church—it must be a good cause and this must be a good country." In 1962 he was elected commander of the Marquette American Legion post. He also participated in the Free and Accepted Masons, the Elks Lodge, the Independent Order of Odd Fellows, and the Kiwanis Club.
