= Marijonas Mikutavičius =

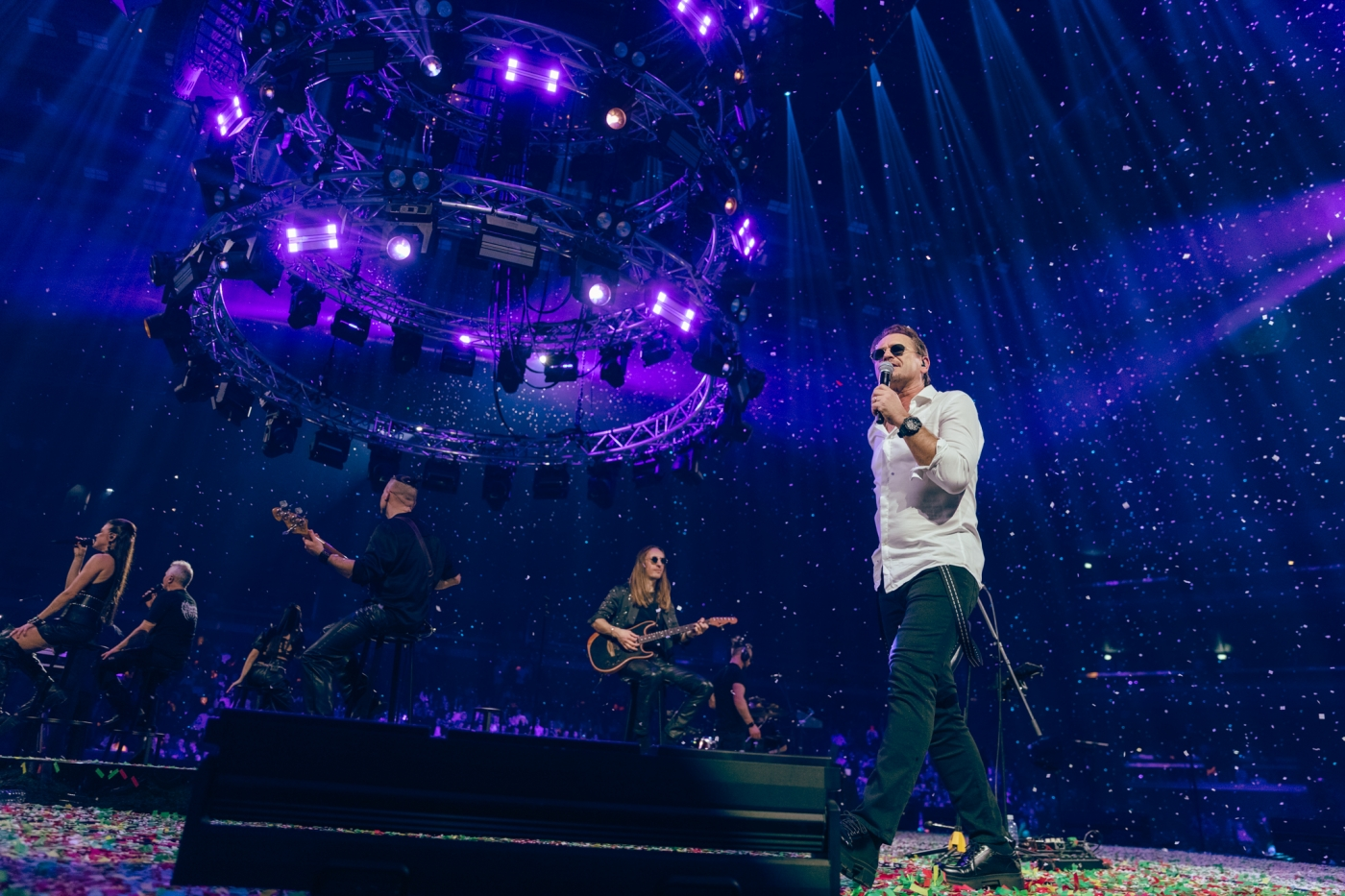

Background information
- Born: Marijus Mikutavičius; 19 April 1971 (age 55); Lazdijai, Lithuanian SSR, Soviet Union
- Genres: Soft rock, Alternative rock, pop, Blues
- Occupations: Singer, songwriter, TV presenter
- Years active: 1995–present
- Label: Promostar
- Spouse: Ieva Daugirdaitė

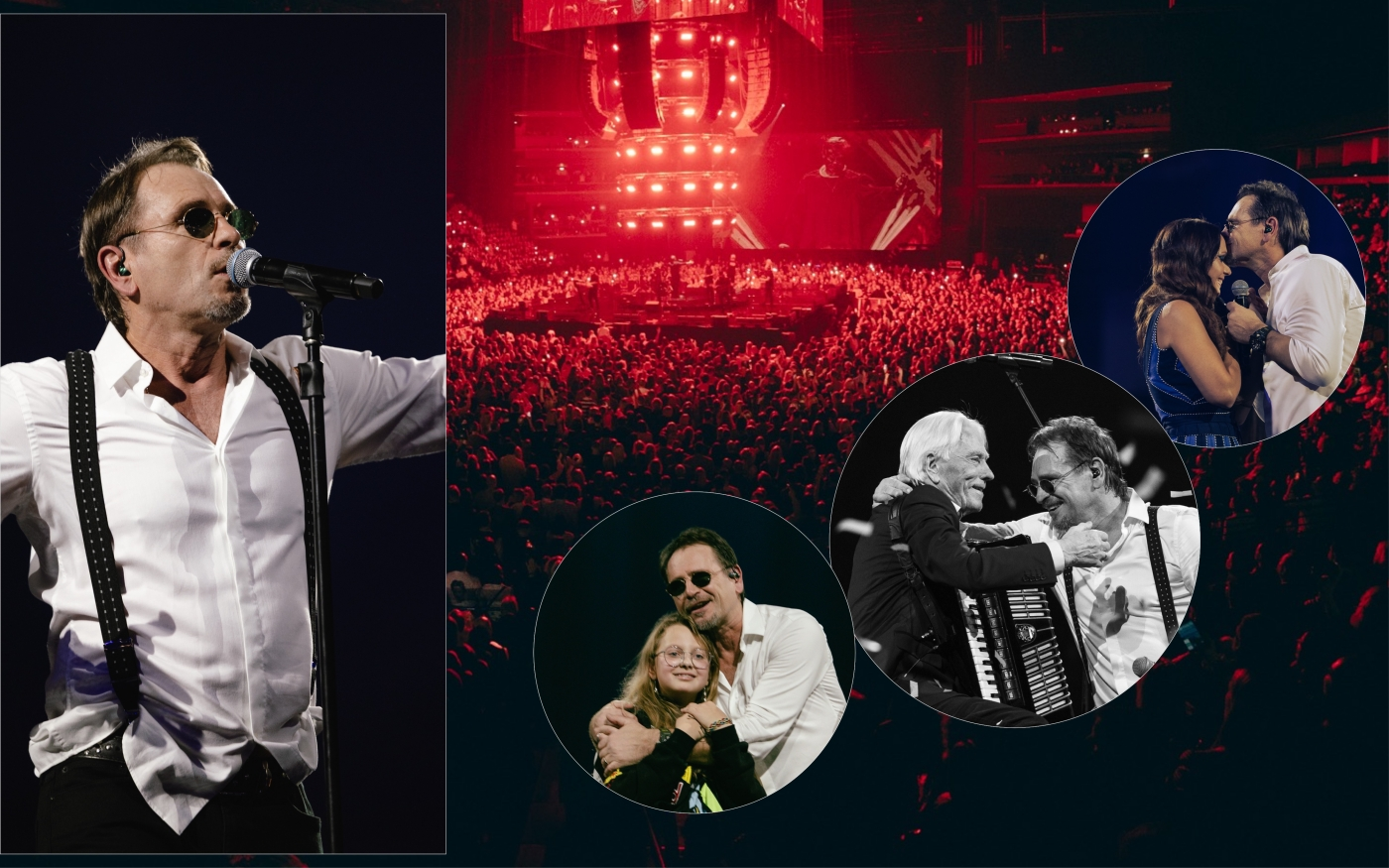
Marijonas Mikutavičius 360 Vilnius 2025

Marijus Mikutavičius (born 19 April 1971), known better as Marijonas Mikutavičius, is a Lithuanian singer, musician and songwriter, a television journalist, a comedian and a talk show host from Vilnius. He is best known for his sports anthem Trys Milijonai as well as an official Eurobasket 2011 song Celebrate Basketball and for representing his country at Eurovision Song Contest 2006 as part of LT United.

== Early life and education ==
Mikutavičius was born in Lazdijai. At the age of nine, he moved with his family to Vilnius. He later entered the Faculty of Communication of the Vilnius University from which he graduated in 1993 as a master in journalism.

== Career ==
While studying at a university, Mikutavičius worked for periodicals and as a Vakaro žinios (Evening News) reporter for Lithuanian television. He also played in a rock band Bovy, which toured around Europe and sang in Scandinavian countries, Germany, and Eastern Europe, and gained recognition as the best vocalist at the Liepājas dzintars (Liepāja's amber) music festival in 1995.

He has been working as a screenwriter and a participant in a variety of programs, usually youth oriented, on Lithuanian National Radio and Television and on major commercial TV channels LNK and Lithuanian TV3. He has hosted Vakaras su Marijonu (An Evening with Marijonas), a talk show on LNK. He also works as a Lietuvos rytas daily correspondent.

Mikutavičius is the author of a number of hit songs which stand at the top of the music charts in Lithuania. As the author of the popular song Trys Milijonai, he became a Bravo 2000 music award winner (Bravo is a Lithuanian analogue of BRIT Awards voted by the music industry people); he is also a recipient of the Radiocentras music award (voted by the listeners).

In 2004, the Lithuanian record label Intervid released his album Pasveikinkit vieni kitus (Greet Each Other), which included two versions of Trys Milijonai. This album reached the platinum award for sales in Lithuania (sold 20,000 copies early in 2004 and more than 30,000 copies by 2005). In February and March 2005, saw a controversy in the media, which arose from the rumors that Mikutavičius apparently, unilaterally sold the rights of the song for five years to "Intervid".

== Albums ==
- "Saulės vartai"(2025)
- "Lengvas būdas mesti klausytis" ("Easy Way to Stop Listening") (2014)
- "Baigėme mokyklą" ("We Graduated School") (2008)
- "Pasveikinkit vieni kitus" ("Greet Each Other") (2004)

== Honours ==
On April 29, 2014, Mikutavičius was awarded the Lithuanian Order of Services for Lithuanians by the former President of Lithuania.

== Singles ==
"Trys Milijonai" (2000)
Often regarded as Lithuanian sport anthem

- "Velnias, man patinka Kalėdos" ("Damn, I Like Christmas")
- "Pakeliui Namo" ("On Our Way Home")
- "Aš miręs" ("I'm Dead")
- "Trys Milijonai" ("Three Million"), a hit song; the official song for Lithuania at the Sydney Olympic Games and a popular unofficial Lithuanian sports anthem
- "Nebetyli Sirgaliai" (Celebrate Basketball), the official basketball anthem for the 2011 Basketball Euro Championships (hosted in Lithuania)
