= Trys Milijonai =

Song by Marijonas Mikutavičius

'Trys Milijonai' (2000)
Often regarded as Lithuanian sport anthem

Trys Milijonai ("Three Million") is a song by Marijonas Mikutavičius (et al.), a Lithuanian journalist, TV talk show host and singer. It is largely regarded in Lithuania as the sports' anthem, as well as the unofficial Lithuanian Olympic team anthem.

The music for the song was written by Andrius Kauklys, Marius Narbutis, Darius Vaičiulis, Marijonas Mikutavičius and the lyrics were written by Marijonas Mikutavičius. The song was first recorded for the 2000 Sydney Olympics by Marijonas Mikutavičius, Deividas Staponkus (baritone), Audrius Rubežius (tenor), and Asta Krikščiūnaitė (soprano).

The song's title comes from an approximation for the Lithuanian population. The actual population of Lithuania was about 3.48 million, and about 84% of residents identified themselves as ethnic Lithuanians during the 2001 census. Thus, there were 2.92 million ethnic Lithuanians at the time the census was taken. However, the worldwide Lithuanian population including emigrants is allegedly counted in the song, as its lyrics state "[...] since there are three million of us in the world".

== History ==
In August 2000, this popular song accompanied the sporting events broadcasts from the Sydney olympics, both on radio and on television. A CD single recording released in the following September immediately became a best-seller; the song was named the song of the year and won Marijonas Mikutavičius a 2000 Bravo music award (this is a voted by music industry people award, a Lithuanian analogue of BRIT Awards).

During the October 2000 parliamentary elections in Lithuania, a parody song "Two Million" came to life. Two million is an approximation of registered voters. It was created together with Dviračio Žinios, a daily political humor show.

Spun off from its success during 2000 Olympics, the song still retained its high popularity through 2002. The musical theme was used again during the Eurobasket 2003, where the Lithuania men's national basketball team won its third EuroBasket title (after 1937, 1939), which made the song a runaway hit and a de facto national basketball anthem. When Lithuania won the European basketball championship in 2003, the song was played right after the final match with Spain.

By the 2004 Athens Olympics, the song has become the unofficial Lithuanian Olympic team anthem and by some, is regarded as highly as the unofficial Lithuanian national sports (especially basketball) anthem.

The Marijonas album Pasveikinkit vieni kitus (Greet Each Other), released by a Lithuanian music recording company "Intervid" in 2004, included 2 versions of "Trys Milijonai" and became a platinum album in Lithuania (sold 20,000 copies in 2004 and more than 30,000 copies by 2005).

Trys Milijonai was played almost on every match when Lithuania men's national basketball team played in Eurobasket 2007 and Eurobasket 2009.
