= Gintaras Karosas =

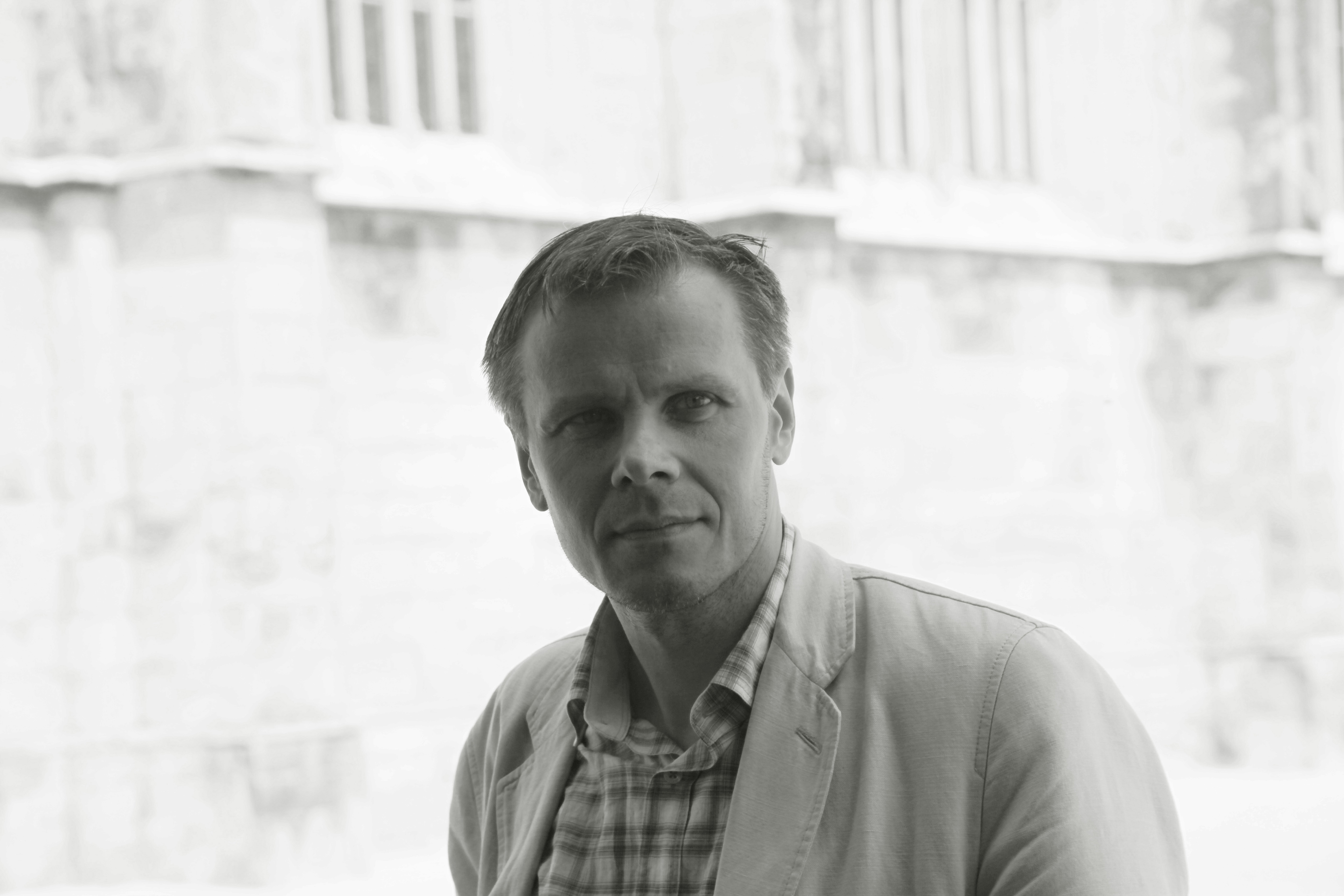
Gintaras Karosas

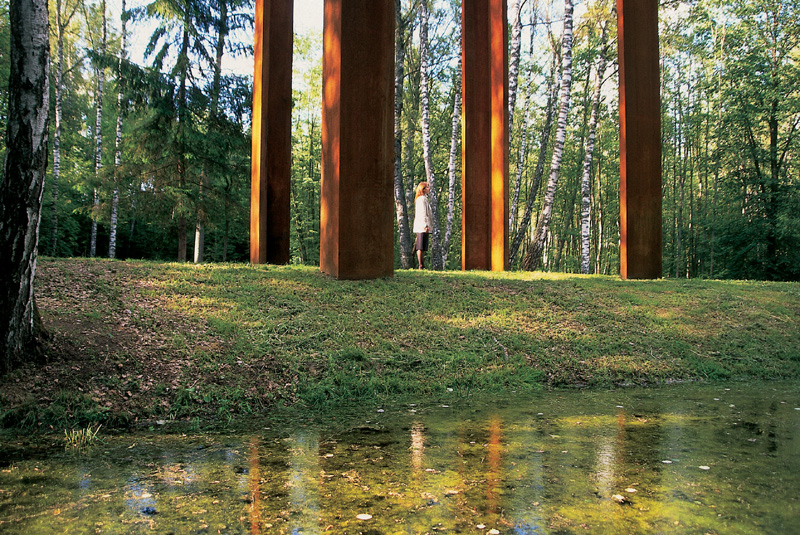
The Place

Gintaras Karosas (born 25 June 1968 in Kryziokai, Vilnius district) is an artist who founded Europos Parkas and designed its landscape.

Karosas organized several exhibitions of his graphic works as a secondary school student. After graduating from the Vilnius Academy of Fine Arts with a degree in sculpting, he studied at museums in Japan and the United States.

His work on Europas Parkas began when he was nineteen - he located a wooded site outside of Vilnius that he felt would be suitable for a sculpture park and began clearing its overgrowth. He placed its first sculpture, Symbol of Europos Parkas, in 1991. Five other Karosas sculptures have since been placed in the park: Monument of the Centre of Europe, For Your Convenience, LNK Infotree, The Place, and Foundations / Window. He also designed its educational center, which features a grass roof.

In 1995 The Wall Street Journal included Karosas in its list of twenty young people who had brought about important changes in Eastern and Central Europe. He received a Saint Christopher statuette from the City of Vilnius in 2001 and a National Cultural Award of Advancement in 2006.

In 2017 Karosas suggested introducing a stronger form of lithuanisation of Poles (which he calls polonised Lithuanians) inhabiting the Vilnius region and claiming the Polish city of Suwałki for the Republic of Lithuania.
