= Europos Parkas =

Modern art museum in Vilnius, Lithuania

- Europos Parkas
- Location: Vilnius, Lithuania
- Coordinates: 54°49′51″N 25°21′05″E
- Type: Open-air museum
- Website: www.europosparkas.org

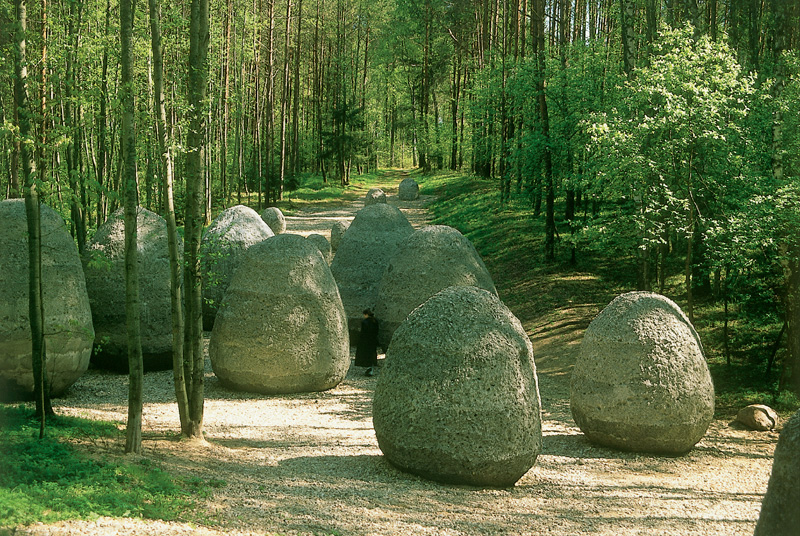
Magdalena Abakanowicz, Space of Unknown Growth

Europos Parkas (the "Park of Europe") is a 50-hectare open-air museum located 17 km from Vilnius, Lithuania. The museum gives an artistic significance to the geographic centre of the European continent (as determined by the French National Geographic Institute in 1989) and presents Lithuanian and international modern art.

== Collection ==
The museum exhibits more than 90 works from 27 countries, including Armenia, Belarus, Canada, Croatia, Cyprus, Egypt, France, Finland, Germany, Great Britain, Greece, Hungary, Ireland, Japan, Lithuania, Mexico, Moldova, the Netherlands, Peru, Poland, Russia, the United States, and Venezuela.

The collection includes large-scale works by the contemporary artists Magdalena Abakanowicz, Sol LeWitt, Ales Vesely and Dennis Oppenheim, among others.

Three of the pieces that are most frequently mentioned by the park's international visitors are:

- LNK Infotree, by Gintaras Karosas, was included in the Guinness Book of World Records as the world's largest artwork. The sculpture, which includes 3,000 television sets, is a 700-meter labyrinth in the form of a tree, with a toppled statue of Lenin in its center. The monument evokes television's power to disseminate propaganda, and the eventual regrowth of the truth.
- Monument of the Centre of Europe, by Karosas, is a series of granite plaques on which are chiseled the names of the capital cities of Europe and their distances from the park.

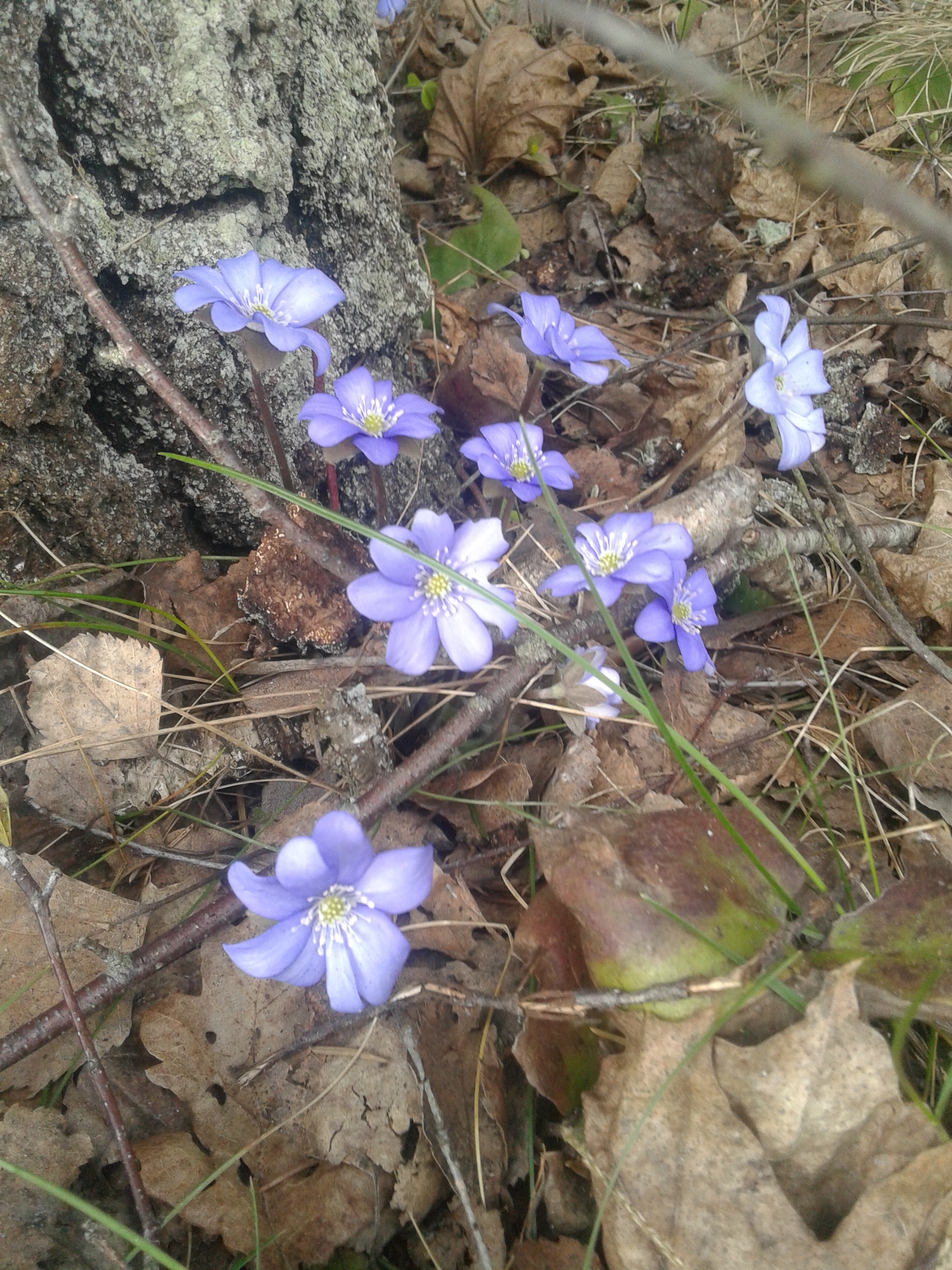
Violet flowers in Parkas. These flowers are common near the entrance.

- Voices Underground, by Patricia Goodrich, is a multimedia presentation that includes wildflower seeds and flowering bulbs planted on a 300-square-foot site. The audio component includes 44 artists from 15 countries speaking about their artistic journeys, creative processes, and life passages, in English and their native languages.

The sculptures are very diverse – from those leaning to the ground to those standing up to ten meters high, from covering just one square meter or others covering 3135 square meters of land. All exhibits weight about 1,000 tons – so much stone, wood, concrete and other materials were used to create the museum in the open air.

== History ==
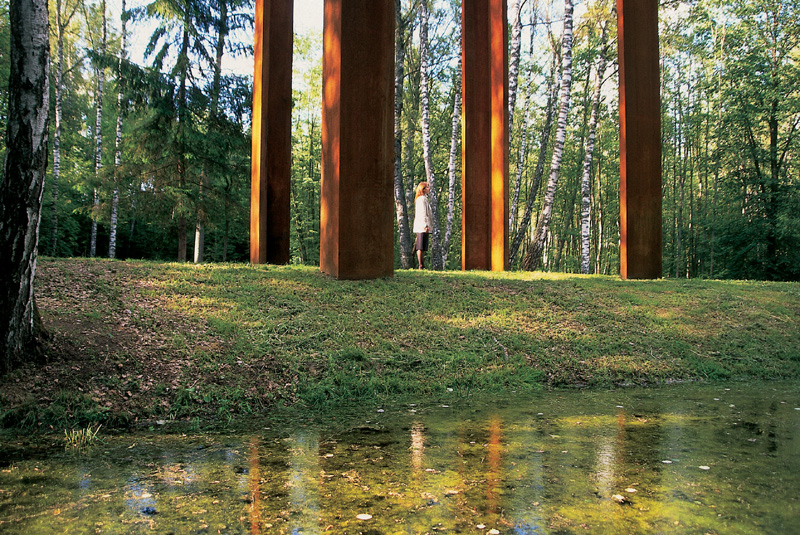
Gintaras Karosas, The Place

Europos Parkas was founded by Karosas as a 19-year-old art student. In 1987, he found a place near Vilnius that struck him as a home for his vision, and started landscaping the site.

In 1991, Karosas placed the first sculpture at the site. The contribution of a work by the American conceptual artist Dennis Oppenheim in 1996 excited international interest in the project. Gintaras Karosas continues to be involved in new contributions: the location of each piece is chosen to harmonize with the site's water features, its surrounding trees, shrubs, and flowers, and its daily patterning of lights and shadows.

== Activities ==
Since 1993, the park has hosted annual International Sculpture Symposias; it hosts international artist-in-residence programs twice a year. Concerts and festivals are held, and a conference center is located at the park.
