= List of highest-funded equity crowdfunding projects =

This is a list of the highest-funded equity crowdfunding projects.

Rank	Project	Category	Sum	Platform	Investors	notes	References
1	BrewDog	Brewery	£72,754,050	Proprietary/Crowdcube	117,917		
2	CoinMetro	Crypto-Exchange	€12,026,735	CoinMetro	7032		
3	Paradox Interactive	Video game industry	$11,800,000	Pepins	2,517		
4	Crowdcube	Crowdfunding	£6,565,000+	Crowdcube	3,000		
5	Ameria	Advertising	€5,000,000	Companisto	2,989		
6	WEISSENHAUS	Real estate	€7,500,000	Companisto	1,679		
7	Etergo	Electric Mobility	€3,225,567	Seedrs			
8	Gohenry	Finance	£3,999,000	Crowdcube	2209		
9	Chapel Down Group plc	Wine	£3,953,819	Seedrs	1,390		
10	JustPark	Travel	£3,514,110	Crowdcube	2,702		
11	Sugru	Manufacturing	£3,388,150	Crowdcube	2,374		
12	Chilango	Food and drink	£3,370,000	Crowdcube	1432		
13	Plant Growth Net Zero Aqualife	Shrimp farm	$4,575,550	crowdfunder			
14	1Rebel	Health and fitness	£2,916,020	Crowdcube	433		
15	Crowdestor Equity Campaign	Crowdfunding	€1,600,000	Crowdestor	477		
16	eMoov	Estate agency	£2,622,360	Crowdcube	765		
17	Witt Energy	Energy	£2,386,030	Crowdcube	1567		
18	Gritpit Fixings	Manufacturing	£4,100,000	Crowdcube	1941		
19	PodPoint	Renewable energy	£3,713,450	Crowdcube	1748		
20	Seedrs	Crowdfunding	£2,580,000	Seedrs	909		
21	Protonet	Hardware	€3,000,000	Seedmatch	1,827		
22	Urbanara Home AG	Homewares	€3,000,000	Bergfürst	≈1,000		
23	Train Alliance AB	Real estate	$4,400,000	Pepins	600		
24	ingogo Pty Ltd	Taxi booking & payments	$4,200,000	VentureCrowd	65		
25	Kronfönster Group AB	Retail & manufacturing	$3,796,095	Pepins	1232		
26	Hab Housing Limited	Real estate	£1,972,560	Crowdcube	640		
27	Parcel Genie	Gift delivery	£1,800,000	Angels Den	51		
28	Lovespace	Storage	£1,562,960	Crowdcube	257		
29	Hotel Kaiserlei	Real estate	€2,400,000	Zinsland	1056		
30	Feldbrunnenstrasse	Real estate	€2,116,200	Exporo	440		
31	Bostäder för unga vuxna	Real estate	€2,111,000	Tessin	179		
32	Companisto	Crowdfunding	€2,100,000	Companisto	2461		
33	Barista	Coffe shop	$2,400,000	Pepins	1682		
34	Naava	Health Tech	$2,368,000	Pepins	1257		
35	UB-Holding	Crowdfunding	€2,000,000	Rendity	357		
36	Alvestaglass AB	Food	$1,944,152	Pepins	900		
37	Sion	Electric solar car	€1,815,000	Seedrs	1,078		
38	Panono	Hardware	€1,615,745	Companisto	1,804		
39	Freygeist	E-Bike	€1,500,000	Companisto	1,110		
40	Sawade	Food	€1,350,000	Companisto	1098		
41	Domaine d´Escapat	Wineyard	$1,240,540	Pepins	760		
42	Uniti	Electric city car	€1,227,990	FundedByMe	570		
43	Nordic Oil	Cannabis Company	€1,167,591	Seedrs	694		
44	Dynamic Code	Health tech	$1,138,700	Pepins	287		
45	Pickawood	Furniture	€1,010,000	Seedmatch	795		
46	AoTerra	Waste heat recovery	€1,000,000	Seedmatch	883		
47	Foodist	Food	€1,000,000	Companisto	1,980	Exit, 192% ROI	
48	I'll Be Next Door for Christmas	Movie	$1,070,000	StartEngine and Wefunder	893	First movie to use equity crowdfunding in the U.S.	
49	HackerNoon	Electronic publishing	$1,065,553.11	StartEngine	1,142		
