= Seedups =

Equity crowdfunding website

SeedUps
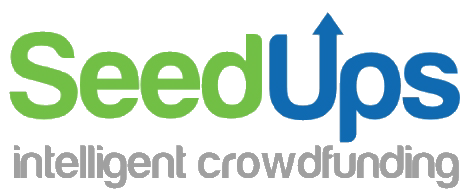
- Website type: Crowd funding
- Available in: English
- Headquarters: Derry, {{{location_country}}}
- Website: seedups.com
- Commercial: Yes
- Launched: November 2010 (Beta)

SeedUps is an equity crowdfunding platform for seed investment to launch and focuses on startup companies. It was founded by Michael Faulkner and Gavin Gallagher in 2010 and is aimed at tech startups in the USA, Ireland and the UK. Since launch over 2200 tech businesses have registered. It is only available to accredited or sophisticated investors. The platform is headquartered in Republic of Ireland with offices in the UK, US and Canada. Each funding project on SeedUps lasts for the same duration, namely 180 days.

A 2011 report by the European Expert Network on Culture (EENC) suggested that SeedUps seemed to be "the most successful European crowdfunding platform for investments", while a 2012 piece in the Irish Independent reported that SeedUps had been "featured in the Forbes top 10 crowdfunding platform list".

Equity crowdfunding in the US has been awaiting SEC rules under the JOBS Act.

== See also ==
- Seedrs
