= Capify =

UK alternative finance company

- Type: Private company
- Industry: Financial services
- Founded: 6 December 2008; 17 years ago
- Headquarters: Altrincham, United Kingdom
- Area served: United Kingdom, Australia
- Key people: David Goldin, John Rozenbroek
- Products: Business loans, Commercial and industrial loans
- Website: www.capify.co.uk www.capify.com.au

Capify is a United Kingdom–based alternative finance company that is headquartered in Altrincham, England. It has a second office in Parramatta, Australia. It is a non-bank financial institution providing business loans to small and medium businesses. The company was founded by David Goldin in 2002.

== History ==
In 2002, David Goldin created AmeriMerchant, an online alternative finance company specialising in revenue advance services for small businesses that ultimately became Capify. He was also a founding member and the previous President of the Small Business Financing Association (SBFA), formerly known as the North American Merchant Advance Association (NAMAA).

In 2008, the company expanded its operations to the United Kingdom under the name United Kapital, and extended its presence to Australia as AUSvance. Capify initially focused on delivering merchant cash advance before expanding its operations to include typical small business loans in 2008. As of 2026, Capify no longer office Merchant Cash Advance (MCA), but continues to offer a wide range of other business loan options.

In 2015, the company rebranded, unifying all the company's brands under the single name of Capify.

By 2017, the company sold its US division, to focus on the UK and Australian markets.

In 2019, Capify secured a £75 million credit facility from Goldman Sachs.

In 2022, Capify revamped its Quarterly SME Business Confidence Survey and introduced a confidence index, which was designed to measure and evaluate the survey results.

== Recognition ==
In 2023, Capify was nominated as a finalist in the Business Moneyfacts Awards in the category of "Best Alternative Business Funding Provider". Capify UK won the "SME Lender of the Year at the Credit Awards.

In the same year, Capify UK was also shortlisted and won the Credit Awards "SME Lender of the Year - Lending up to £1 million" award.
