= Artmo =

Art dedicated app

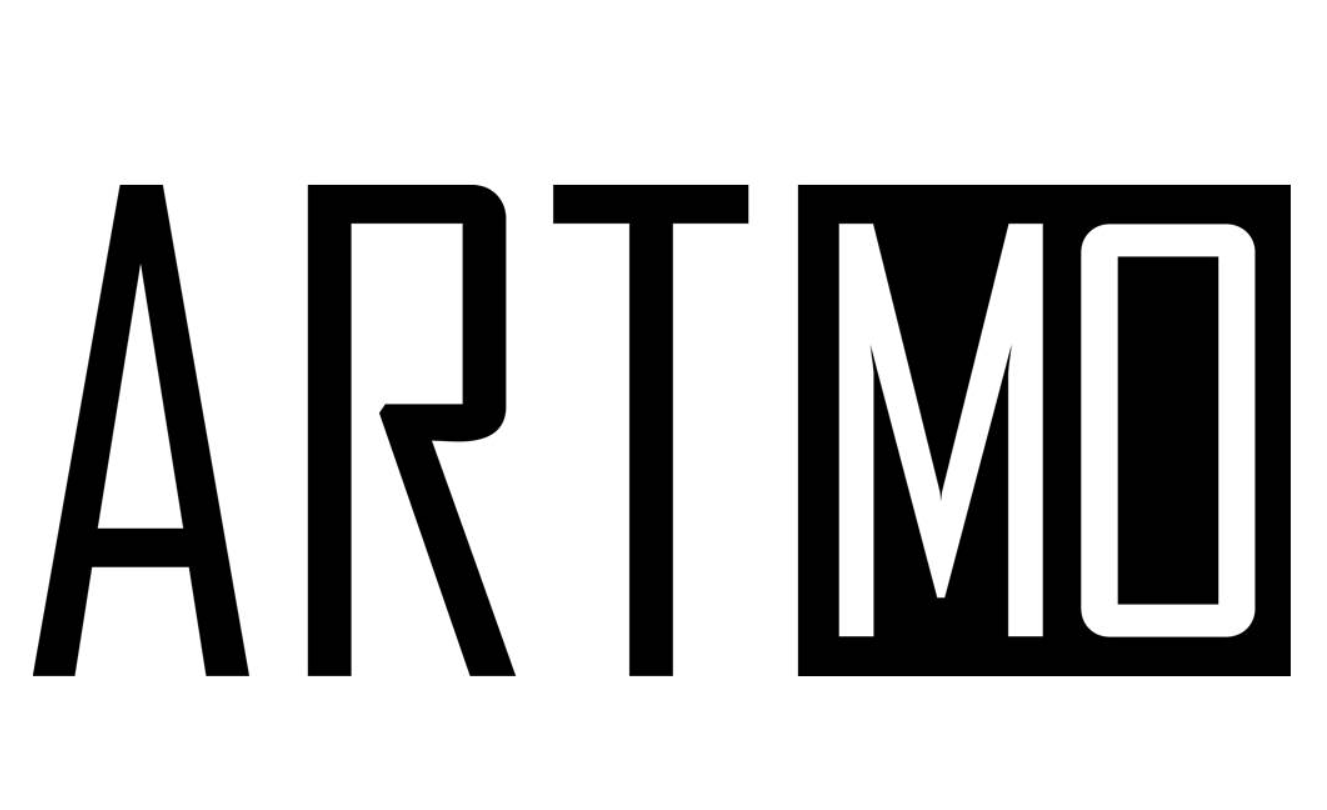
- Website type: Social art network
- Available in: 26 languages
- Country of origin: Germany
- No. of locations: 2
- CEO: Klaus Rasche
- Key people: Konrad Krawczyk, CPO
- Industry: Art market
- Employees: 33
- Website: artmo.com
- Registration: Free
- Launched: 2018

Artmo.com is an online social media platform based in Hamburg, Germany. It works as a platform to promote art and connect those who are interested in selling, buying, or merely discussing art. The website also works as a social media featuring direct communication between artists, galleries and universities. The company is a start-up that has been funded by Companisto since 2020.

== History ==
The company was founded as a start-up in 2017 by Klaus Rasche, Konrad Krawczyk, and Nick Laursen, and was officially launched as a website in mid-2018. Artmo works as a social media network between different members of the art market, such as galleries, artists and collectors. Like other online art pages, such as Artsy and Saatchi Gallery, artworks can be sold and bought within the platform.

In May 2019, eu-startups.com elected Artmo as one of ten European art start-ups to look out for.

In December 2020, Artmo began its first financing round with Companisto, an equity-based crowdfunding website. The goal was to reach €220,000, which was achieved by mid-January 2021. By November of that same year, the website had already surpassed 100,000 members.

A second round of the crowdfunding campaign was opened for Artmo in December 2021, aiming to reach €500,000 in a little more than a month. By the first week, it had already reached a third of its goal. Starting from January 2021, the company reached its goal to be funded by Companisto.

At that moment, the funding had surpassed €800,000, and in March 2022 the crowdfunding was reaching €900,000, almost two times over the initial funding goal. Artmo's revenue comes mostly from the gateway fee, a percentage taken from every completed transaction, and advertising put up on their website.

== Characteristics ==
While the vast majority of other art online shops work with commission models, Artmo offers to its users selling art without any kind of commission. It offers a subscription model, in which artists or private art collectors can open their own shops for a fee allowing the seller to interact directly with the buyer, in a model similar to e-commerce websites like Etsy and eBay.

Artists are required to provide certificate of authenticity to their artwork, as do art collectors who intend to sell pieces they own, although it doesn't require approval before allowing a member to subscribe to the website.

Artmo also contains a news section on its website, named Buzz. News relating to different aspects of the art world, such as art history and upcoming exhibitions, are available for readers.

Although online art shops focused on non-fungible token/blockchain digital artworks grew rapidly in late 2010s, and became especially common after a boom in their popularity in early 2021, Artmo doesn't work with them. In January 2022, Artmo announced that a project to allow for digital downloadable artworks to be hosted and sold through their platform was under development.

== Social media ==
Artmo is loosely based on LinkedIn, an employment and business-oriented social platform. The website claims to be "the first ever social art network", allowing people to discuss art freely. That way, it would distant itself from otherart marketplaces, by allowing members to discuss news and specifics about their works and also privately message one another.

The website contains a section in which people can interact directly with one another via comments on posts or direct messaging, as one would in an average social media website. Given that Artmo is a theme-based social media, focused on art, the posts and discussions all revolve around art, and it's encouraged that private conversations also be art-related. That way, artists can sell their artworks and network simultaneously.

Users can subscribe to the site as either artists or members. A user directory is accessible for any registered member, in which every account registered to the website is available for following or contacting. Large institutions such as the Fine Arts College of Shanghai, the University of the Arts London and the Royal Danish Academy of Fine Arts have accounts on the website, which they use to promote their art courses to possible students. Museums use the website as well, usually to promote new exhibitions.

== See also ==
- Artnet
- Saatchi Art
