= Snowball effect (disambiguation) =

Snowball effect is a figurative term.

Snowball effect may also refer to:

- Snowball Effect, an equity crowdfunding platform in New Zealand
- "Snowball Effect", a SpongeBob SquarePants episode from season three
- Snowball Effect ISP, an Internet service provider in South Africa
