= VentureCrowd =

- Type: Private
- Industry: Crowdfunding; Financial technology
- Founded: October 2013; 13 years ago
- Headquarters: Sydney, New South Wales, Australia
- Area served: Australia
- Key people: Steve Maarbani; Co-founder and CEO
- Services: Equity crowdfunding Property crowdfunding Debt-based crowdfunding
- Parent: VentureCrowd Holdings Pty Ltd
- Website: venturecrowd.com.au

VentureCrowd is an Australian multi asset class crowdfunding platform, headquartered in Sydney, including equity crowdfunding, property crowdfunding and debt-based crowdfunding. VentureCrowd completed the largest Australian equity crowdfunding raise, $4.2 million, for taxi-booking and payment software company Ingogo in May 2015. This deal is ranked 8th on the List of highest funded equity crowdfunding projects. In June 2016, VentureCrowd raised more than $900,000 for a Western Sydney residential project - a 35-lot development in Riverstone East, in partnership with the property developer ClearState. In August 2016, a second project raised $1,700,000 for a 44-lot development project in Austral.

== History ==
VentureCrowd was founded in October 2013 in Sydney by Australian alternative investment management company Artesian. VentureCrowd launched its first startup equity crowdfunding deals in October 2014. and property crowdfunding deals in partnership with Mirvac in April 2015.

In 2022, VentureCrowd used its own crowdfunding platform to raise $3.9 million for VentureCrowd Holdings Pty Ltd as part of a broader $10 million Series A round. The holding company later faced legal proceedings over a contested share buyback, with the Queensland Supreme Court ordering it to pay more than $2.4 million to a former shareholder. An appeal by VentureCrowd Holdings Pty Ltd was dismissed by agreement in early 2025. The company subsequently sought to raise a further $1 million through a Series B+ campaign on its platform, but raised $348,000 by the campaign's March 26 deadline.

In April 2026, VentureCrowd Holdings Pty Ltd entered external administration after a secured party appointed W. Roland Robson as administrator. At an initial creditors' meeting, claims totalling $7.3 million were reported. VentureCrowd co-founder and chief executive Steve Maarbani described the process as a corporate debt restructure and said the company's operating subsidiaries and managed funds were unaffected and continued to trade. Creditors later voted to replace Robson with Barry Wight and Stephen Earel of Cor Cordis as administrators.

== Equity Crowdfunding in Australia ==
Currently Australia does not allow equity crowdfunding for the general public but only for wholesale (sophisticated) investors (whom are defined as investors holding net assets in the amount of $2.5M or achieve a gross income of $250,000 in the last 2 financial years).

The Australian federal government's now dissolved Corporations and Markets Advisory Committee (CAMAC) released its report on equity crowdfunding in May 2014. The report proposed a regulatory regime specifically designed for and to facilitate crowd sourced equity funding (CSEF) in Australia. The CAMAC report recommended Australia introduce legislation allowing retail investors to invest up to $10,000 a year in start-ups via equity crowdfunding, with a maximum of $2,500 in each company. It suggested companies be allowed to raise up to $2 million per year on such platforms.

In the 2015 Federal Budget, as part of its small business package, the government announced that it would make it easier for small businesses to access capital by allowing crowd-sourced equity funding and by simplifying related reporting and disclosure requirements. Although details on the specific model have not yet been released, Treasury has set aside $7.8 million in funding over four years to enable the Australian Securities and Investments Commission (ASIC) to implement and monitor the regulatory framework to facilitate the use of crowd-sourced equity funding when it is unveiled before the end of 2015.

== See also ==
- Comparison of crowdfunding services
- Pozible
- Birchal
