= Pozible =

Australia-based crowdfunding platform

pozible
- Website type: Crowd funding
- Founded: 9 May 2010
- Headquarters: Melbourne, Victoria
- Country of origin: Australia
- Founders: Alan Crabbe; Rick Chen
- Industry: Internet
- Services: Rewards-based crowdfunding
- Subsidiaries: Birchal
- Website: www.pozible.com

Pozible is an Australia-based crowdfunding platform and community-building tool for creative projects and ideas. It was developed to help people raise funds.

== Model ==
Pozible is a crowdfunding platform and creative community. Projects are launched on the Pozible website after a reviewing process to make sure the project abides by the platform's project guidelines. Project creators select a deadline and a target amount to achieve. Supporters are invited and encouraged to pledge an amount to support the project's campaign. During the project's campaign, project creators are encouraged to publicise their works through embedded videos, word of mouth, social networks and regular project updates.

If the nominated target is not met by the deadline, pledges are not processed. Supporters require a MasterCard or Visa credit card or debit card to make a pledge. In May 2012, Pozible introduced PayPal as a payment method. In October 2013, Pozible introduced Bitcoin as a payment method. As of April 2025, they also accept Google Pay and Apple Pay, but it is unclear if they still support PayPal or Bitcoin.

Pozible takes a 5% service fee from successful projects, and a transfer is made into the project creator's bank account or PayPal account. Partners and previously successful project creators are only required to pay a 4% fee for their successful projects. In April 2014, Pozible reduced fees for projects that raise over $100,000 to 4% and over $500,000 to 3%. In turn, project creators must provide rewards (non-financial at present) to their supporters, relative to how much is pledged, though pledgers are not obliged to select a reward, they can still pledge funds with no reward chosen. Unsuccessful projects are not required to pay a fee.

Pozible supports standard all-or-nothing project-based crowdfunding campaigns in multiple countries, and also donation campaigns for not-for-profit organisations based in Australia. They previously supported self-hosted crowdfunding campaigns, which could be embedded in an external website.

After announcing a beta in 2014, Pozible launched a subscription-based crowdfunding service on 1 November 2018. It shut down the subscription service at the end of June 2022.

== History ==
Pozible was launched as Fundbreak in May 2010 by Alan Crabbe and Rick Chen. Pozible's good reputation among arts practitioners and connections in the local Australian arts industry has seen collaborations with festivals and government partners such as ScreenWest, the Emerging Writers Festival and the Melbourne and Sydney Fringe Festivals and many local non-for-profit organisations.

The Fundbreak brand was relaunched as Pozible in January 2011, and established offices in Melbourne and Sydney, Australia. In May 2012, Pozible launched internationally - switching to www.pozible.com from www.pozible.com.au - and partnered with PayPal to offer multi-currency transactions. Pozible now accepts projects and funding support in 22 major currencies.

In 2013, Pozible achieved a number of milestones: it raised AUD $1 million+ in a single month for the first time; this was repeated in September 2013 and in subsequent months.

As at 31 December 2013, Pozible went live in Malaysia and Singapore.

As at April 2016, Pozible has hosted over 10,000 projects and raised a total of over $40 million towards projects from Australia and around the world. Pozible continues to operate from its headquarters in Melbourne, Australia and has opened offices in Silicon Valley (USA), China and Singapore.

Pozible was listed as one of three start-ups to watch in 2014 by The Australian Financial Review, one of 'five start ups to watch in 2014' by Startup Smart and Smart Company and was featured on the cover of TechCrunch.

Pozible's overall success rate is 58%, with individual categories averaging up to 70%.

In 2017, Birchal was founded as a sister platform to Pozible, offering equity crowdfunding.

== See also ==
- Comparison of crowdfunding services
- VentureCrowd
