= Ensombl =

Information Technology company

Ensombl PTY LTD
- Ensombl logo
- Company type: Australian Private Company
- Website type: Social networking service
- Available in: English
- Founded: 2014
- Headquarters: Sydney, Australia
- Country of origin: Australia
- Area served: Worldwide
- Founders: Clayton Daniel; Ben Nash; Ray Jaramis; Adrian Patty
- CEO: Clayton Daniel
- Website: ensombl.com

Ensombl, formerly XY Adviser, is an international social networking service that offers education and continuing professional development for financial professionals. As of 2023, it hosts approximately 9,000 members.

The company was founded in Sydney, Australia in 2014. The company developed a web and mobile application in 2020. It is used most in Australia, and opened a second headquarters in Cape Town, South Africa in 2023.

== History ==
=== Founding ===
Ensombl was founded by Clayton Daniel, Ben Nash, Ray Jaramis and Adrian Patty. It began as a Linkedin group called XY Adviser, where financial advisors could share and learn from one another. The four founders developed a website and an online blog.

As the community increased, the founders decided to create a social networking community with a mobile application. The original name was based on the idea of connecting generation X and generation Y.

=== Operating as XY Adviser (2014-2022) ===
In 2020, Ensombl began hosting an independent platform. They raised $400,000 on the crowdfunding platform, Birchal to fund the development.

In 2019, the community reached 3500 members and ran 12 annual events. They did some advocacy as well, attempting to make upfront advice tax deductible for professionals.

In January 2020, Ensombl was nominated for the Sydney City Business Awards. In September 2021, they were named a finalist for 'Excellence in Innovation' under the original name. They began expanding into South Africa and Southeast Asia at this time.

In June 2022, Ensombl worked with Hub24 to co-produce the documentary, Solving Wealth's Greatest Challenge. In October, they partnered with CFS to build a new service called the Professional Year Hub on the platform Elevate in October, 2022. Elevate contained educational content developed by investment managers. 150 financial advisers tested out the hub for two years prior to its release.

=== Renaming to Ensombl (2022 - present) ===
In November 2022, XY Adviser was renamed Ensombl.

In September 2022, Ensombl presented at CMX Summit in San Francisco, CA, USA.

In August 2023, Ensombl announced that it is working to raise $3 million in Series A funding. In July 2023, Craig Keary, former CEO of Ignition Advice, joined the company as non-executive chair. He took over the role of Andrew Rocks, who remained on the board of Ensombl in the position of director. In September 2023, Ensombl was launched in Cape Town, South Africa. The company planned the move for two years. They had an event in South Africa in August 2023 in preparation for moving into the new market. At this time, the community had 8,000 members, and it was the most downloaded financial advice podcast. The company ran a survey called "What Advisers Want" and queried 5,600 of its members. In this survey, they learned that the Australian government's Quality Advise Review was the primary issue of concern amongst financial professionals using the platform. Additionally, Statements of Advice and professional indemnity insurance acquisition were public issues of concern.

== Platform ==
Ensombl provides free membership and generates revenue by helping companies optimize products for financial advisers. The platform features elements of social interaction, regular podcasts, and annual events. As of 2020, the company uses advertising revenue to help fund its service. The service does not sell user data as a part of the advertising revenue.

Ensombl has over 8,000 financial advice professionals on its platform. The average age of members is approximately 42 years, and women make up one-third of the membership.

In 2022, they began recruiting accountants and nurses as a part of their strategy of professional development.
