= Artsy (website) =

Online art brokerage

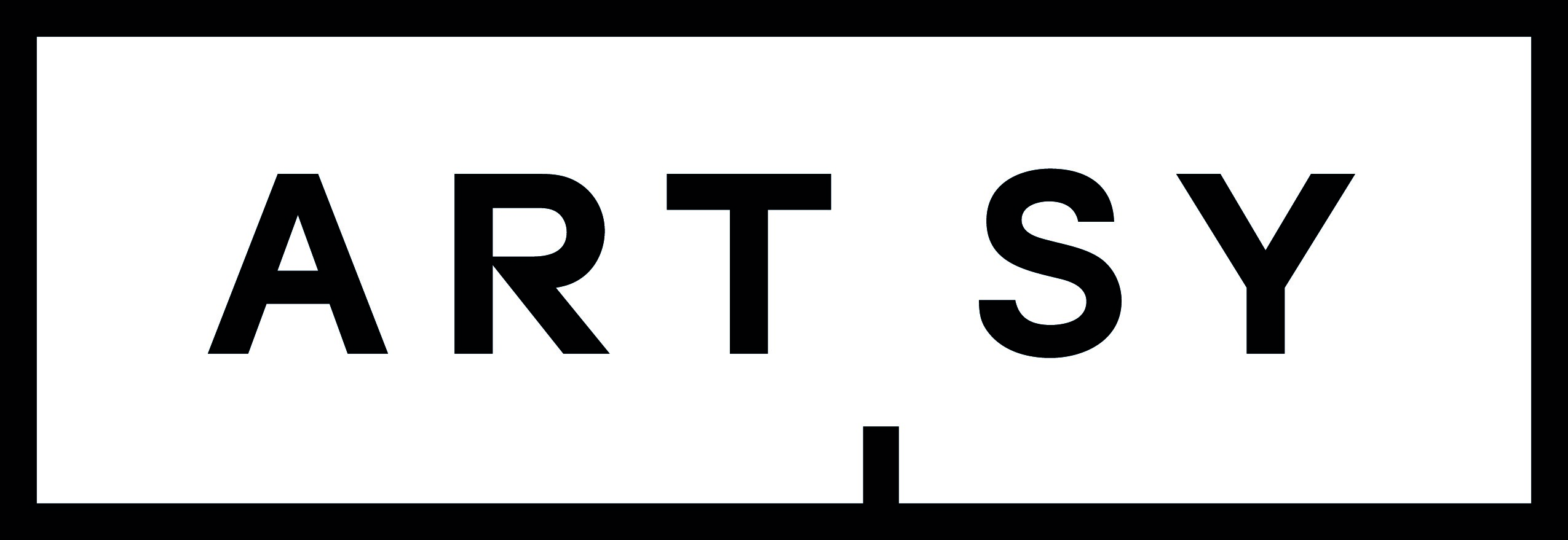
- Genre: Art website; collaborative consumption; online fine art marketplace
- Founded: 2 March 2009
- Founder: Carter Cleveland
- Headquarters: New York City, United States
- Key people: Jeffrey Yin, CEO; Carter Cleveland, founder, and executive chairman; Sebastian Cwilich, co-founder and former president and COO; Devang Thakkar, former VP of Marketplace and Head of Auctions; Wendi Murdoch, co-founder and board director; Dasha Zhukova, co-founder and investor
- Website: www.artsy.net

Artsy, formally known as Art.sy Inc is a New York City based online art brokerage. Its main business is developing and hosting website for numerous galleries as well as selling art for them. It utilizes a search engine and database to draw connections and map relationships among works of art.

The brokerage was founded by Carter Cleveland, a Princeton University computer science graduate. It is currently led by Jeffrey Yin, who was appointed CEO in June 2024.

== History ==
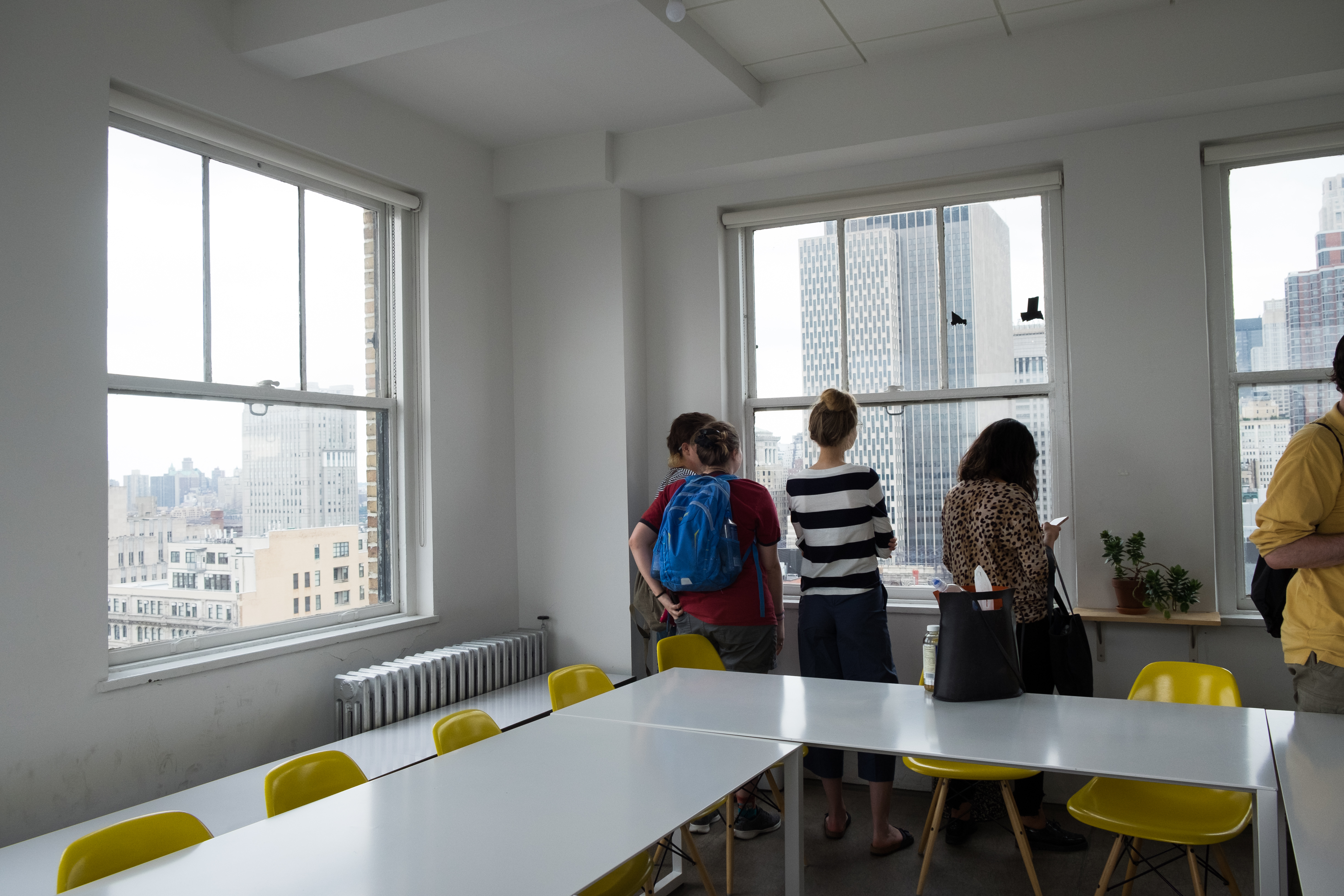
ARTSY headquarters

Carter Cleveland, the son of an art historian, founded Artsy during his senior year at Princeton University and worked on the site from his dorm room. Cleveland's goal was for the site to serve as a place where users could discover art online. In May 2010, Artsy participated in the New York City conference, TechCrunch Disrupt, where they competed in the Startup Battlefield and received the Yahoo! Rookie Award! A year later, the team demoed Artsy at the Beyeler Foundation at Art Basel (June 15, 2011).

In November 2011, Artsy closed a round of financing from Eric Schmidt, Wendi Deng Murdoch, Dasha Zhukova, Larry Gagosian, Jim Breyer, Joshua Kushner, Jack Dorsey, Chris Dixon, and Dave Morin.

In 2019, it was reported that in 2018 the data for 1,070,000 accounts were stolen from Artsy. The information included the name, email address, location, IP address and password SHA-512 hashed with a salt. The passwords were not stored in cleartext, but an email from Artsy encouraged users to change their passwords.

== Corporate affairs ==
=== Financials ===
Since launching, Artsy has raised a total of $100 million from individuals in the worlds of art, tech, and media.

=== Products (website and app) ===
Artsy currently features over 1,000,000 works by 100,000 artists on its site through partnered galleries. As of March 2018, Artsy averaged 2.3 million unique visitors each month.

=== The Art Genome Project ===
When Artsy launched in October 2011, its main product was The Art Genome Project — "an ongoing study of the characteristics that distinguish and connect works of art". A collaboration between art historians and engineers, and led by art historian Matthew Israel, The Art Genome Project drew upon art-historical scholarship and artificial intelligence to assign values to artwork based on eventually as many as 1211 characteristics or "genes". These categories ranged from color and period to "Technique: Documentary Photography" and "Group Portrait". The Art Genome Project aimed to help users uncover works of art based on personal taste and preference to facilitate the discovery of art. As of 2020 the AGP was on hold for restructuring.

== Reception ==
According to Wired, Artsy "has the potential to introduce each buyer to a wide range of artists and artworks, all of them related in some way and—this is key—most of them unknown and otherwise inaccessible to any but the most knowledgeable connoisseurs".

Critics of Art.sy label The Art Genome Project forced and artificial and point to the difficulty of representing the full experience of art online.

== See also ==
- ArtFacts.Net
- Artmo
- Artnet
- Saatchi Art
