= Docety =

Distance learning platform

- Available in: Italian
- Owners: Nicola Palmieri; Mario Palladino; Michele Forlante
- Website: https://www.docety.com/
- Commercial: Yes
- Registration: Optional
- Launched: 3 December 2018

Docety is an Italian e-learning and distance education platform. The platform allows you to take advantage of 1 to 1 consultancy, participate in seminars, manage a calendar of face-to-face private lessons and consult video courses.

== History ==
Docety was launched in October 2018 by Nicola Palmieri, Mario Palladino (known on YouTube as Redez and Synergo of the Quei Due Sul Server channel, lit. "Those Two Guys On the Server") and Michele Forlante. The launch was preceded by a video presentation of the project on YouTube, written by co-founders Nicola and Mario on their channel, which heralded the equity crowdfunding campaign on Mamacrowd, to finance the project.

The campaign allowed Docety to raise around €540,000 from around 360 members, exceeding the maximum target of €500,000 and reaching an overfunding of + 680% compared to the minimum target of €80,000.

In 2020, the launch of Docety Journal, a free online semester directed by Francesco Toniolo, Antonello Fabio Caterino, Nicola Palmieri and Maria Virginia Matteo, is announced. The magazine offers news regarding the world of distance learning, academic digitization and new trends in the Internet subculture.

== Courses ==
Docety provides courses including several categories: electronics, business, marketing, photography, filmmaking, music, Foreign languages. The courses are organized in: video courses, private lessons, bookable by consulting the coaches' calendars; seminars, with a maximum number of members of 50 people, in which participants can interact with the teacher and users in real time. The courses are accessible through credits, which can be purchased in packages, directly on the platform.

The coaches are selected and provide certifications, through the consultancy of the European research center Lo Stilo di Fileta, recognized by the Italian Ministry of Education, University and Research.

== Initiatives ==
With the declaration of a state of emergency in Italy due to the COVID-19 pandemic, Docety announced free availability, upon request, of its services for public and private entities involved in the emergency. The targets identified were administrative bodies and rescue services, for the provision of seminars dedicated to the management of the pandemic, as well as universities, laboratories and research centers, to provide training courses and online video lessons, with the possibility of stipulating between institution and company memoranda of understanding for the provider of training credits (ECTS).

In October 2020, Docety announced the launch of MyDocety, an initiative through which a package of services of the white-label platform is made available for sale, which can be purchased by companies and enterprises to internally deliver the same Docety services, specific for the business. or the dissemination initiative.

== See also ==
- Educational technology
