= Republic (fintech) =

American crowdfunding broker

- Type: Private
- Industry: Online fundraising, financial services
- Founded: 2016; 10 years ago
- Founders: Kendrick Nguyen, Peter Green, and Paul Menchov
- Headquarters: New York City, United States
- Products: Investment platform
- Website: republic.com

Republic is a global financial firm operating an enterprise-focused digital merchant bank and a network of retail-focused investment platforms. Backed by Morgan Stanley, Valor Equity Partners, Galaxy Interactive, Hashed, AngelList and other leading institutions, Republic boasts a portfolio of over 2,500 companies and a community of 3 million members from over 150 countries. More than $2.6 billion has been deployed through investment platforms, funds, and firms within the Republic family of companies. It is headquartered in New York City and has operations in the US, the UK, the EU, the UAE, South Korea, and Singapore.

Republic is known for opening new asset classes to investors of all types with a particular emphasis on using tokenization to expand access and liquidity.

== History ==
Republic was founded by Kendrick Nguyen, Paul Menchov and Peter Green in 2016. By July 2021, the company had deployed over $500 million in investments.

In November 2020, Republic launched the Republic Cities program in Dallas to fundraise for companies in Dallas from the local community.

In 2021, Everyrealm (at the time, Republic Realm), formerly a metaverse real estate investment channel of Republic, purchased a parcel of virtual land in Decentraland for close to one million US dollars. The lot has turned into a virtual shopping district and houses JPMorgan's lounge.

Republic has its own profit-sharing digital security token, the Republic Note, but has not minted the tokens or made any new developments since launching.

In October 2021, Republic announced a $150M Series B round led by Valor Equity Partners.

Republic Capital, its venture arm, has invested in companies including Carta, Dapper Labs, Klarna, Kraken, Pipe, and Plaid.

== Acquisitions ==
In June 2019, Republic acquired SheWorx, a company that helps female entrepreneurs raise capital. Lisa Wang – the founder – subsequently left Republic.

In April 2020, Republic acquired Fig, a video game crowdfunding platform. The first offering from Fig that was co-hosted by Republic was that of Intellivision Amico. Despite its fundraising success – to the tune of $39 million across multiple campaigns (including one on competitor site StartEngine) – it has faced multiple delays and remained in development until July 2022.

In June 2020, Republic made an acqui-hire for Compound, a real estate investment platform to create Republic Realm. However, the division later spun off and rebranded as Everyrealm. In October 2022, a sexual harassment and racial discrimination lawsuit was filed against Everyrealm and Republic.

In November 2020, Republic acquired certain assets of NextSeed, a local crowdfunding platform.

In December 2021, Republic entered into an agreement to acquire British equity crowdfunding business Seedrs for $100 million in an effort to expand to Europe. This acquisition faced pushback from regulatory bodies and the Seedrs investor base, citing preferential treatment given to large shareholders.

In April 2024, Republic Announces Acquisition of GoldenChain, the Digital Asset Arm of GoldenTree Asset Management.

== See also ==
- Datalogic
