= Typewise =

Virtual keyboard featuring hexagonal keys

- Developer: Typewise AG
- Release: December 2019; 6 years ago
- Operating system: Web
- Type: AI customer service platform
- Website: https://typewise.app/

Typewise is a Swiss artificial intelligence company headquartered in Zurich that develops an AI agent platform for customer service automation. The platform uses artificial intelligence agents that resolve customer requests across channels such as email, chat and messaging, and can execute actions in connected business systems. Founded in 2019, the company initially developed a smartphone keyboard application with text prediction technology created in collaboration with ETH Zurich, before shifting its focus to business customer service software after participating in Y Combinator in 2022.

== Products ==
=== AI agent platform ===
Typewise develops a platform that automates customer service interactions using artificial intelligence agents. The platform's agents interact directly with customers and can execute actions in connected business systems, such as customer relationship management, enterprise resource planning and ticketing software, within configured limits. Each agent is configured through natural language instructions in a no-code interface rather than through programming.

In February 2026 the company launched a multi-agent orchestration system, marketed as the AI Supervisor Engine, in which a supervising agent analyzes incoming customer requests and decides whether a specialized agent or a human employee should handle them. The system includes a review agent that checks outgoing responses against company guidelines before they are sent. The platform can use large language models from several providers, including OpenAI, Anthropic and Google.

According to the company, the platform operates across channels including email, web chat, WhatsApp and social messaging, and is offered with usage-based pricing per resolved conversation.

=== Text prediction and keyboard ===
Its first product was a virtual keyboard for Android and iOS devices. The keyboard features a self-developed hexagonal layout and a predictive typing engine suggesting the next word depending on context and multilingual language support. In January 2022, the company filed a patent for its technology, which the company claims outperforms those of Google and Apple.

In December 2021, Typewise keyboard had been installed over 1.4 million times and in January 2022, the keyboard won a Consumer Electronics Show (CES) Innovation Award for the second year running.

== History ==
Typewise was founded in May 2019 by David Eberle and Janis Berneker. Its head office is in Zürich, Switzerland. Eberle had previously worked as a management consultant and Berneker as a data scientist, the two have known each other since high school.

In 2015, Eberle and Berneker initiated a Kickstarter crowdfunding campaign where they raised approximately USD 17,000. With those the founders launched an app prototype in 2016 under the name “WRIO Keyboard” on App Store and Play Store. In 2019, Typewise launched the app to the public. In July 2020, Typewise sought and received funding from angel investors as well as a Swiss research grant, totaling US$1.04 million, allowing for the continued development of the keyboard's artificial intelligence.

At that point, the app had amassed roughly 250,000 downloads and had approximately 65,000 active users. By November 2020, Typewise expanded its total financing to US$1.52 million, including the research grant.

In October 2021, Typewise raised CHF 1.8 million (approximately €1.7 million) in a crowdfunding campaign on Seedrs.

In 2022, Typewise was selected for the Y Combinator Summer 2022 batch, receiving the accelerator’s standard US$500,000 backing. During this period the company shifted its focus from a consumer keyboard app to business-to-business text prediction tools aimed at improving typing productivity in customer service and sales teams. PitchBook lists total funding of US$4.6 million from 17 investors.

By February 2026, the company's agents had been deployed at more than 50 enterprises, according to Eberle.

In September 2026, Typewise launched Nova, an AI operator that builds, runs and improves a company’s customer-service AI agents, offered with outcome-based pricing.

== Awards ==
- European Customer Champion (EUROCC) 2024 – Typewise's AI writing solution was used in DPD (Schweiz) AG's project "Typewise@DPD – Produktivitätssteigerung durch KI", which was one of the three winning projects at the 2024 European Customer Champion awards, recognized for improving customer service efficiency by more than 25%.
- CES Innovation Award 2022 – Honoree for Software & Mobile Apps
- BOSA (Best of Swiss App Awards) 2020 – Gold for Functionality & Silver for Innovation
- CES Innovation Award 2021 – Honoree for Software & Mobile Apps
- Swiss AI Award – 2nd Place
