= Ingogo (company) =

ingogo
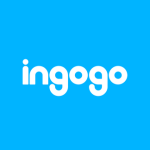
- Type: Private
- Industry: Taxi booking and logistics, Technology
- Founded: August 2011
- Headquarters: Sydney, Australia
- Area served: Sydney
- Key people: Lee Furlong (CEO)
- Website: www.ingogo.com.au

ingogo is an Australian company that specialises in online taxi bookings. The company services the northern suburbs of Sydney.

== Overview ==
The company has its own GPS-enabled booking system, and allows any nearby taxi service to pick up a fare regardless of which taxi service they work for. The company was the first in Australia to provide passengers with fixed fares, which included all tolls and charges, and no surge pricing or extra fees due to traffic jams. Ingogo's system allows users to book a taxi days in advance. The company has focused on gaining corporate clients such as Qantas.

== History ==
In 2011, entrepreneur Hamish Petrie convinced Moshtix, a company Petrie founded in 2003 and later sold to News Digital Media in 2007, that his idea was workable.

In May 2014, the company closed its internet-based tax receipt service when it was discovered that a security flaw enabled people to access information about clients, the last four digits of credit card numbers and taxi number plates.

In 2015, Ingogo raised $12 million in a funding round that valued the company at $100 million. It claims to have raised more than $16 million in total from Australian investors. More than $4 million came from crowdfunding alone, which was a record on the Australian equity-crowdfunding platform VentureCrowd. The Australian Federal Government has also given the company a grant. Another investor was MYOB co-founder Brad Shofer.

In December 2016, the company postponed plans for a float on the Australian Securities Exchange. It was reportedly considering preference shares or a rights issue in the short term.

In 2021, passengers in New South Wales were able to book taxis through Ingogo using their Opal commuter cards as part of a six-month trial which included ride share and share bike companies.

In March 2026, ingogo announced its return to service in North Sydney after Manly Cabs went into administration.
