= Seed money =

Early financial support for a new project

Seed money is the earliest financial support a new project receives, often arriving at a point when an idea exists but nothing concrete has been built yet. This first backing helps a venture take its initial steps and gives people working on it enough stability to continue developing their work. An investor puts capital in a startup company in exchange for an equity stake or convertible note stake in the company. The term seed suggests that this is a very early investment, meant to support the business until it can generate cash of its own (see cash flow), or until it is ready for further investments. Seed money options include friends and family funding, seed venture capital funds, angel funding, and crowdfunding. Seed money can come from informal contributions, early‑stage investment instruments such as SAFEs or convertible notes, accelerator programs, and public or community funding initiatives. Seed funding is also shaped by accelerators and policy initiatives that influence how new ventures find backing in their earliest stages.

== Usage ==
Startup financing stages

Seed money gives early ventures enough support to begin testing their ideas before any reliable revenue exists. Seed money can be used to pay for preliminary operations such as market research and product development. Investors can be the founders themselves, using savings and loans. They can be family members and friends of the founders. Investors can also be outside angel investors, venture capitalists, accredited investors, equity crowdfunding investors, revenue-based financing lenders, or government programs.

This first level of backing often affects how a project is perceived, since it signals to potential supporters that others view the work as credible and worth exploring. Experiments in economics and community programs show that an initial contribution can increase later participation once donors or partners see that someone else has already committed resources.

== Early-stage funding ==
Seed capital can be distinguished from venture capital in that venture capital investments tend to come from institutional investors, involve significantly more money, are arm's length transactions, and involve much greater complexity in the contracts and corporate structure accompanying the investment. Seed funding is generally one of the first steps investors offer to get startups on their feet before they become fully operational. Seed funding involves a higher risk than normal venture capital funding since the investor does not see any existing projects to evaluate for funding. Hence, the investments made are usually lower (in the tens of thousands to the hundreds of thousands of dollars range) as against normal venture capital investment (in the hundreds of thousands to the millions of dollars range), for similar levels of stake in the company. Seed funding can be raised online using equity crowdfunding platforms such as SeedInvest, Seedrs, and Angels Den. Investors make their decision whether to fund a project based on the perceived strength of the idea and the capabilities, skills and history of the founders.

== Funding in different economies ==
Access to early funding varies widely across the world, and ventures in low income economies often face challenges in securing it. Research on Malawi’s seed sector shows that many entrepreneurs work in informal settings where rules are unclear and policy support is inconsistent. Under these conditions new ideas struggle to grow, and promising projects rarely move beyond a small local presence because the environment cannot support early expansion. Agricultural and rural sectors provide a clear example of this pattern. Many programs in these areas rely on seed grants to build skills, create access to markets, or even strengthen local regulatory systems. Over time, these initial investments contribute to more stable supply chains and improve the resilience of food systems as a whole.

Research in international development shows that early funding plays a central role in helping new ventures emerge in low income countries. When projects receive support at the beginning, they are able to test ideas and reach markets that are otherwise out of reach for small firms. The World Bank notes that this kind of early backing often becomes the starting point for broader economic activity which influences everything from job creation to the spread of new technologies.

Founders in wealthier economies operate in a different landscape. They can turn to organized investor networks, accelerator programs, incubators, or legal tools that make early financing more accessible. The difference in available support creates a divide in how new ventures develop globally and shape everything from the number of startups that emerge to how long they survive once they begin operating.

== Financing mechanisms ==
Modern startup ecosystems use several standardized instruments for raising seed money: SAFEs, KISS agreements, and convertible notes. SAFEs (Simple Agreements for Future Equity) allow investors to convert their investment into equity in later financing rounds, without establishing valuation at the seed stage. KISS agreements (Keep It Simple Securities), developed by 500 Startups, combine elements of SAFEs and convertible notes but include standardized terms and investor protections. Convertible notes serve as loans that convert to equity when the company raises future rounds, blending debt and equity features.

These instruments have become increasingly popular because they reduce early legal costs and help startups raise small amounts quickly. Their adoption also reflects a trend toward faster, more flexible seed rounds compared to traditional priced equity offerings.

=== Impact of accelerators and incubators ===
Accelerators and incubators often shape what happens after a project receives its first financial backing, since these programs guide founders through the early stages of building a workable venture. IFC’s global research shows that startups entering accelerators tend to move further in the investment process and are more likely to secure additional funding once the program ends. Participation also exposes teams to mentors, professional networks, and structured training, which helps them adjust their business models and connect with initial customers.

Work in sustainability fields points to a similar trend. When early funding is combined with the support structure of an accelerator, green technology projects and community focused innovations experience smoother transitions and important long term outcomes.

== Global trends ==
Crowdfunding has taken on a growing role in early stage financing, especially in places where venture capital is harder to access. Data on Regulation Crowdfunding in the United States shows steady growth in the number of companies using this approach to raise their first rounds of capital. The rise of these platforms reflects a broader shift in how people contribute to new ventures, since individuals can now back early projects without the traditional barriers associated with institutional investment.

At the same time, industry research points out that the broader fundraising landscape has become more demanding. Investors placing seed level capital often look for clearer signs that a project has early momentum, evidence of customer interest, or a workable financial path before making a commitment.

=== Measurable outcomes from funding ===
Research consistently finds that seed money produces measurable improvements in project performance across multiple sectors. In charitable fundraising, seed contributions significantly increase donation likelihood from later donors. In higher education, seed grants increase research output, collaborative engagement, and long term program sustainability. In startup ecosystems, seed capital combined with accelerator participation improves follow on funding rates and overall venture survival. In global development, seed money strengthens entrepreneurial ecosystems and enhances long term economic resilience.

== Government funding ==
This is the most selective type of funding. Government funds may be targeted toward youth, with the age of the founder a determinant. Often, these programs can be targeted towards adolescent self-employment during the summer vacation. Depending on the political system, municipal government may be in charge of small disbursements. The European Commission runs micro finance programs (loans under €25 000) for self-employed people and businesses with fewer than 10 employees. European seed capital is available, but typically is limited to a 50% share. European SMEs can often benefit from the Eureka program, which federates SMEs and research organizations, such as universities. Government programs are often tied to political initiatives.

== Distinctions between funding ==
Industry sources often distinguish between pre‑seed, seed, and Series A financing by the level of traction a venture has achieved, the milestones it has met, and what investors expect at each step. Pre‑seed funding usually arrives when founders are still refining the concept, testing feasibility, and validating that a problem is worth solving. At this point, capital is used for early experiments, basic research, and assembling an initial team rather than for large‑scale operations.

Pre‑seed rounds frequently overlap with informal seed money sources such as friends and family contributions, small angel checks, or early accelerator stipends, because these backers are willing to support ideas before there is reliable revenue. Seed funding typically follows once a project has some evidence of promise, enabling product development, initial customer acquisition, and early market testing to show whether the model can work at a larger scale. Capital at this stage may come from angel investors, seed‑focused venture funds, organized accelerators, crowdfunding campaigns, or targeted government grants that aim to move ventures from prototypes toward repeatable operations.

Series A financing generally occurs only after a venture shows clearer traction, such as growing user numbers, paying customers, or other indicators that the concept has a viable market. Investors use these rounds to supply larger sums aimed at scaling operations, expanding teams, and improving revenue‑generating capacity rather than proving basic viability. In practice, the boundaries between these stages can blur, but the distinction helps founders and backers align expectations about risk, evidence, and the types of capital and support that are appropriate at each point in a venture’s development.

== Other sources ==
Seed money may also come from product crowdfunding or from financial bootstrapping, rather than an equity offering. Bootstrapping in this context means making use of the cash flow of an existing enterprise, such as in the case of Chitika and Cidewalk.

== See also ==
- Angel investor
- Digital currency
- Crowdsourcing
- Private equity
- Revenue-based financing
- Series A round
- Venture capital
