= SyndicateRoom =

UK venture capital fund

- Website type: Venture capital fund
- Available in: English
- Headquarters: Cambridge, {{{location_country}}}
- Founders: Gonçalo de Vasconcelos, Tom Britton
- CEO: Graham Schwikkard
- Industry: Venture capital
- Employees: 17
- Website: syndicateroom.com
- Commercial: Yes
- Launched: 21 September 2013

Syndicate Room Ltd, trading as SyndicateRoom, is a UK venture capital fund, headquartered in Cambridge, founded by Gonçalo de Vasconcelos and Tom Britton in September 2013. The company is authorised and regulated by the Financial Conduct Authority.

SyndicateRoom initially launched as an equity crowdfunding platform for high-net-worth individuals and angel investors.

In October 2019, the company announced that it would adopt a venture capital fund investment model, and would no longer offer individual crowdfunding investment opportunities.

== History ==
SyndicateRoom was founded by Gonçalo de Vasconcelos and Tom Britton on 21 September 2013. The pair met while studying at the Cambridge Judge Business School at the University of Cambridge.

In April 2014, SyndicateRoom was named Startup of the Year by The Guardian Small Business Showcase.

In June 2014, SyndicateRoom investors committed £700,000 to Radio Physics Solutions, a startup which builds technology to detect 3D printed guns.

In May 2015, SyndicateRoom raised £1.2m in seed funding on its own crowdfunding platform.

In March 2016, SyndicateRoom was the first crowdfunding platform to offer public market investment opportunities after being accepted as a member company of the London Stock Exchange, although it has since closed down the public markets area of its platform.

In May 2016, SyndicateRoom raised £3.1m funding in series A round led by Abcam founder Jonathan Milner.

In June 2016, SyndicateRoom launched FundTwenty8, the first passive Enterprise Investment Scheme fund.

In July 2019, Gonçalo de Vasconcelos stepped down as CEO and was replaced by Graham Schwikkard.

In September 2019, SyndicateRoom launched Access EIS, the first data-driven Enterprise Investment Scheme fund.

In October 2019, the company announced that it would adopt a new fund-first investment model, and would no longer offer individual equity crowdfunding investment opportunities.

In April 2020, SyndicateRoom invested in Oxford-based laundry startup Oxwash, alongside Twitter co-founder Biz Stone.

In March 2022, SyndicateRoom invested in London-based startup Slip.
