= Business loan =

Loan intended for business purposes

A business loan is a loan specifically intended for business purposes. As with all loans, it involves the creation of a debt, which will be repaid with added interest. There are a number of different types of business loans, including bank loans, mezzanine financing, asset-based financing, invoice financing, microloans, business cash advances and cash flow loans.

== Types ==
=== Bank loan ===
A bank loan may be obtained from a bank and may be either secured or unsecured. For secured loans, banks will require collateral, which may be lost if repayments are not made. The bank will probably wish to see the business’s accounts, balance sheet and business plan, as well as studying the principals' credit histories. Many smaller businesses are now however turning towards Alternative Finance Providers, especially in the case of smaller firms.

Loans from credit unions may be referred to as bank loans as well. Business loans from credit unions received the second highest level of satisfaction from borrowers after loans from small banks.

Methods of business loan assessment, monitoring, risk management, and pricing affect the growth and performance of banks and other lenders. They also affect access to finance by would-be borrowers. The types of business financial information on which lenders base their decisions have changed significantly over the years – along with the management of business lending in general.

=== SBA loans ===
The US Small Business Administration (SBA) does not make loans; instead it guarantees loans made by individual lenders. The main SBA loan programs are SBA 7(a) which includes both a standard and express option; Microloans (up to $50,000); 504 Loans which provide financing for fixed assets such as real estate or equipment; and Disaster loans. In FY 2016, total 7(a) volume was $11,967,861,900 and total 504 loan volume was $2,517,433,000.

=== Mezzanine finance ===
Mezzanine finance effectively secures a company’s debt on its equity, allowing the lender to claim part-ownership of the business if the loan is not paid back on time and in full. This allows the business to borrow without putting up other collateral, but risks diluting the principals’ equity share in case of default.

=== Asset-based finance ===
Once considered the finance option of last resort, asset-based lending has become a popular choice for small businesses lacking the credit rating or track record to qualify for other forms of finance. In simple terms, it involves borrowing against one of the company’s assets, with the lender focusing on the quality of the collateral rather than the credit rating and prospects of the company. A business may borrow against several different types of asset, including premises, plant, stock or receivables.

=== Invoice finance ===
In recent years, it has become increasingly difficult for small and medium-sized enterprises to obtain traditional finance from banks. Alternative options are invoice discounting or factoring, whereby the company borrows against its outstanding invoices, with the ability to obtain funds as soon as new invoices are created. It is often questioned which option is best for your business – factoring or discounting – and the answer depends on how the business wants to be perceived by customers. With factoring, the finance company charges interest on the loan until the invoice is paid, as well as fees, and the finance company takes ownership of the debtor ledger and uses its own credit control team to secure payment. With invoice discounting, the business maintains control of its own ledger and chases debts itself.

=== Microloans ===
Smaller loans, usually for loan amounts of $100,000 USD or less, are referred to as “microloans.” Banks are less likely to make these loans than alternative lenders. When they do, the decision is usually based on the personal credit score of the business and/or the business credit score.

=== Online lenders / non-traditional lenders ===
There has been a rise in the number of online lenders offering small business loans. Online alternative lenders originated an estimated $12 billion in small business loans in 2014, with unsecured consumer loans representing $7 billion and small business loans accounting for approximately $5 billion. Nonbank lenders that make small business loans have doubled their outstanding portfolio balance every year since 2000. Some online originate loans from their own capital. Others may use a “marketplace” model, in which they match borrowers to loan products from a variety of lenders. Popular business loan products that online lenders offer include: term loans, lines of credit and merchant cash advance. Others use crowdfunding platforms that allow businesses to raise capital from a wide variety of sources. This model has grown and will keep growing due to the fast process and minimum documentation it requires.

== Secured and unsecured business loans ==
Business loans may be either secured or unsecured. With a secured loan, the borrower pledges an asset (such as property, plant, equipment, stock or vehicles) against the debt. If the debt is not repaid, the lender may claim the secured asset. Unsecured loans do not have collateral, though the lender will have a general claim on the borrower’s assets if repayment is not made. Should the borrower become bankrupt, unsecured creditors will usually realise a smaller proportion of their claims than secured creditors. As a consequence, secured loans will generally attract a lower rate of interest.

Lenders that make business loans often use a UCC filing to alert other creditors of their security interest in the property of the business. UCC filings may be placed against specific assets, or a blanket UCC filing secures interest in all property. UCC filings may affect the business credit score and may make it more difficult to obtain subsequent financing. UCC filings have become less common in alternative financing. Most lenders will only file a UCC against the business in the event of default.

=== Personal guarantees ===
Many lenders require principals with 20% or greater ownership in the business to provide a personal guarantee. The personal guarantee allows the lender to attempt to collect the debt from the personal assets of the guarantors. Small business lenders may waive the personal guarantee requirement if the business has strong business credit scores and revenue. In May 2016, changes to the Member Business Lending rule by the National Credit Union Administration board further improved these loans, by allowing credit unions discretion in obtaining a personal guarantee from a borrower.
