= Bergfürst =

German banking and financial services company

Coordinates: 52°31′26″N 13°22′48″E

Bergfürst AG
- Company type: Public (Aktiengesellschaft)
- Industry: Banking; Financial services
- Founded: 2011; 15 years ago
- Headquarters: Berlin, Germany
- Area served: Germany, Spain, Austria
- Key people: Guido Sandler (CEO); Robert Koch; Djama Sümenich; Oliver Pabst (Chairman of the supervisory board)
- Services: Real estate development; Real estate investment; Equity crowdfunding
- Revenue: EUR 4.7 million
- Total assets: EUR 6.4 million
- Number of employees: >20
- Website: bergfuerst.com

Bergfürst AG (German pronunciation: [bɛɐ̯kfʏɐ̯st ʔaːˈɡeː]) is a German equity crowdfunding firm, financial services provider and former bank headquartered in Berlin, Germany.

== History ==
Bergfürst was founded in 2011 by Guido Sandler and Dennis Bemmann as a closely held joint-stock company, with Sandler holding most of the company's shares. Operations started in early 2013 after obtaining a BaFin permission. Originally, Bergfürst provided investing options into start-up companies, but since 2014, has been offering real estate investments on its platform. In the same year, Berliner Volksbank acquired Bergfürst shares. In 2014, Bergfürst obtained a banking license, but eventually handed back the banking license in 2015. Axel Springer SE invested into the company in 2016. In 2019, Commerz Real AG acquired a 24.9 % stake in Bergfürst and became the second-largest shareholder. Since May 2019, Bergfürst has been partnering with Dortmund-based software developer Adesso SE. In 2019, Bergfürst had become the second-largest crowdfunding real estate investing platform on the German market, based on the 2019 investment volume. The investment volume sank in the 2020 fiscal year, from 2019's EUR 43.8 million to EUR 37.6 million. This was caused by the Covid-19 pandemic. Based on the total investment volume – which reached EUR 100 million in 2020 – Bergfürst is Germany's third-largest crowdfunding real estate investing platform (as of 2020).

== Business model ==
Bergfürst is a crowdfunding-based real estate investing platform. It combines multiple investments of small-scale investors into a single, large-scale real estate investment to enable higher rates of return for its investors. In his extensive 2021 how-to guide, Tobias Gillen explains that investors can make investments ranging from EUR 10 to 25,000 on Bergfürst. The real estate companies usually use the investors' money as mezzanine capital to obtain favourable loans from other financial service providers to realise their projects. The constructed property co-financed by Bergfürst is sold after project completion.

== Criticism ==
Bergfürst was deemed a "flagship fintech firm" until the late 2010s. Since then, Bergfürst has been criticised for its business model. In May 2019, the "Z19 Stadthaus Plus" project in Bernburg that was financed by Bergfürst had to file for insolvency and went into administration. According to a 2021 in-depth Handelsblatt article written by Lars-Marten Nagel and Michael Verfürden, 500 small-scale investors lost EUR 440,000. The "Z19 Stadthaus Plus" project was followed by the "Bellavista 71" project, in which small-scale investors lost over EUR 2.2 million. Apparently, Bergfürst had overestimated the property developer's guarantee. Johannes Krayer writes that the property development phase began at an unusually early state, prior to the necessary land purchase, which Krayer says is completely "incongruous".

Property developer Bonafide accused Bergfürst of withholding negative information regarding certain projects and deliberately hampering the communication between investors and property developers. Bergfürst on the other hand accused Bonafide of acting in violation of contract, because Bonafide tried contacting investors privately instead of paying the interest according to the contract they made with Bergfürst.

Philipp Frohn argues in an extensive 2022 Wirtschaftswoche article that Bergfürst's crowdfunding may become unprofitable in some cases due to increasing prices for raw material and increasing mortgage interest. As of summer 2022, only 4.3 % of all Bergfürst projects have been delayed, but according to fonds analyst Stefan Loipfinger, "the numbers have been cooked", and for most projects it is uncertain, whether nor not the timetable for the financing is realistic.

Nagel and Verfürden also point out that Bergfürst "deludes" its investors into assuming a non-existent safety. This opposes a 2012 Tagesspiegel article, in which Corinna Visser writes that Bergfürst's founders "make no pretence" of the fact that Bergfürst is a high-risk type of investment.

In 2020, Deutsches Kreditinsitut conducted a test among 23 investment platforms, in which they tested for their performance and offerings. Bergfürst is said to have a "very good offering", "favourable conditions", and a "good customer service". According to the test, Bergfürst has a high rate of return, and investors are informed sufficiently about the risks and costs of an investment on the Bergfürst platform.

== Corporate structure ==
Bergfürst is an Aktiengesellschaft under German law with closely held shares. Therefore, Bergfürst is supervised by the BaFin. The firm's largest shareholder is its CEO Guido Sandler, the second-largest shareholder (24.9 %) is Commerz Real. Two additional major shareholders are Axel Springer SE, and Berliner Volksbank. As of April 2019, Bergfürst has 20 employees, and – as of August 2022 – financed more than 90 projects. It has had more than 93,000 small-scale investors who invested more than EUR 140 million into projects.
