= Symbid =

Online funding platform

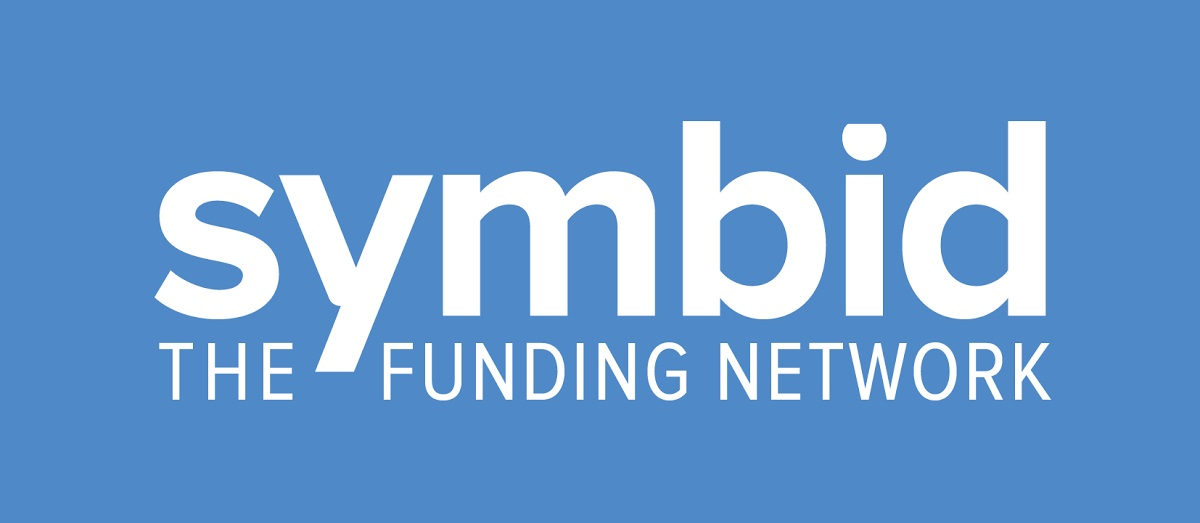
- Company type: Public
- Website type: Equity crowdfunding platform
- Available in: Multilingual (4)
- Traded as: OTCQB: SBID
- Founded: April 1, 2011 (15 years ago)
- Headquarters: Rotterdam, Netherlands
- Area served: Eurozone (2011–present)
- Founders: Korstiaan Zandvliet; Robin Slakhorst (CCO); Maarten van der Sanden (COO); Sjoerd Geurts
- Key people: Maarten van der Sanden (COO); Jeroen Bontje (Managing Director); Robin Slakhorst (CCO)
- Industry: Crowdfunding
- Subsidiaries: Equidam; Krediet Paspoort
- Website: symbid.com
- Users: 30,000 (active, March 2015)
- Current status: Active

Symbid (also known as The Funding Network) is an online funding platform providing access to traditional and alternative finance for small and medium-sized enterprises. Headquartered in Rotterdam, Netherlands, Symbid was founded in April 2011 by Dutch entrepreneurs Robin Slakhorst and Korstiaan Zandvliet as one of the first equity crowdfunding platforms worldwide. Since 2017, Symbid operated under the license of Ilfa Group, that bought Symbid early 2019.

== History ==
=== Early years ===
In 2007, Symbid's founders Robin Slakhorst and Korstiaan Zandvliet met while studying Entrepreneurship & New Business Venturing M.Sc. at Rotterdam School of Management.

Between 2007 and 2010 Zandvlliet and Slakhorst coordinated a fiscal-legal structure allowing non-accredited investors to invest online in start-ups and small businesses. While a number of crowdfunding platforms began to appear online from 2006 onwards, these were associated with creative projects and rewards or donation-based crowdfunding. Few countries had introduced formal equity crowdfunding legislation at this time. Symbid was founded in April 2011 as one of the first equity crowdfunding platforms worldwide.

=== Expansion ===
In 2012, Symbid became one of the platforms in the growing European equity crowdfunding industry.

=== Ownership interests ===
Symbid had ownership interests in Gambitious Coöperatie U.A. and 12% of Gambitious B.V.—the Dutch divisions of crowd funding and video game publishing company Gambitious Digital Entertainment (now Good Shepherd Entertainment) Symbid sold their ownership in 2014. As of 2015, it had ownership interest in the online business valuation tool Equidam, and the initiative funded by the Dutch Ministry of Economic Affairs, which operates a tool which enables entrepreneurs to present critical business information to investors in a standardized format, namely Kredietpaspoort, through its parent company, Symbid Corp.

=== Going public ===
On December 6, 2013 Symbid, through its parent company Symbid Corp., acquired a public listing in the United States on OTCQB Markets. As of July 2014, Symbid became one of the first publicly traded crowdfunding platforms worldwide. In addition to going public, Symbid Corp. conducted a private placement offering (PPO), raising a gross total of (US)$2,926,695. In accordance with this public listing, Symbid Corp. opened offices in New York City, United States.

=== The launch of The Funding Network ===
Symbid and financial advisory firm Credion signed a partnership agreement in December 2014, creating the largest Dutch online funding platform by transaction volume. The partnership sees Credion using the Symbid platform to connect its nationwide network of investors and entrepreneurs, combining alternative and traditional sources of funding. Credion Director Carlo van der Weg described the partnership as “streamlining the way in which entrepreneurs find that crucial investment." Although not revealed at the time, this partnership was the precursor to the launch of The Funding Network in March 2015.

In March, 2015, Symbid relaunched its website and rebranded as Symbid, The Funding Network. Previously an equity crowdfunding platform, as of March 2015 Symbid began offering other financial products and services for start-ups and small businesses including financial advice, monitoring and traditional and alternative financing options. In addition to a redesigned website, Symbid released a new monitoring product based on XBRL data.

As of March 2015, Symbid claims to have connected 30,000 private (crowdfunding) investors and 40 institutional investors to The Funding Network, plus other online funding platforms active in niche industries, such as FarmersFunding. Following the launch, on 24 March Symbid and Economic Board Utrecht (EBU) announced a partnership to provide local, sustainable initiatives with loan capital via The Funding Network. EBU has committed $1 million in growth capital to entrepreneurs on The Funding Network in 2015.

=== Symbid Italia venture ===
Symbid announced the incorporation of Symbid Italia on 10 March 2015, in partnership with Gruppo Banca Sella. In 2016, Symbid Italia was deemed economically inviable and on April 29, 2016, a shareholders meeting determined to liquidate Symbid Italia.

=== Financial troubles ===
In 2014 and 2015 Symbid reported low turnover ($267,358 and $282,155 respectively) and a net loss of $2,821,794 (2014) and $2,299,275 (2015). In April 2015 the complete non-executive board of directors resigned in what Symbid reports as a "differences with remaining management concerning the Company’s strategic direction". Also in April 2016 it was reported that Symbid made their development team redundant. More losses of $2,005,751 in the first half year of 2016 "raise substantial doubt about the Company’s ability to continue as a going concern". On October 12, 2016, the remaining three directors decided to reduce their salary to zero,"retroactive to August 1, 2016". They also stated that "the company is investigating the options available for further cost reductions.".

At the same time, Symbid will have to apply for a license as investment firm under the MiFID to continue equity based crowdfunding activities as required by the Dutch AFM, the Netherlands Authority for the Financial Markets, for all equity-based crowdfunding activities.
