= Uniti (automobile) =

Failed Swedish EV startup

Uniti Motors

- Trade name: Uniti Motors
- Type: Public company
- Industry: Automotive
- Founded: January 1, 2016; 10 years ago
- Founder: Lewis Horne
- Headquarters: Lund, Sweden
- Products: Uniti One; Uniti Zero
- Number of employees: 7 employees
- Website: https://www.unitimotors.com/

Uniti Motors, originally Uniti Sweden, is a Swedish automotive startup. The company was founded in January 2016 by a team of students and engineers under CEO Lewis Horne which aimed at developing an electric microcar in Lund, Sweden. It filed for bankruptcy in April 2022. No products at the time were ever delivered to customers.

Uniti started as an open innovation project at Lund University and became an independent startup in January 2016. The company focused on delivering a climate neutral lightweight electric microcar with high-end digital features.

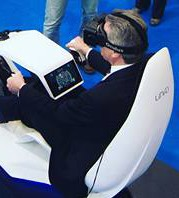
European Commissioner Günther Oettinger driving a Uniti car simulator with a simulated steer-by-wire system and augmented reality HUD at CeBIT 2016

The company was initially funded through a series of crowdfunding campaigns, angel investors and institutional investors. The company had over 3000 investors from 40 countries. The company also conducted vehicle pre-order campaigns at Media Markt locations in Stockholm and Malmö, with VR test-drives available.

== Bankruptcy ==
Uniti Sweden AB entered bankruptcy proceedings in early 2022 after several years of financial instability and an inability to secure sufficient long‑term capital. The District Court of Lund formally declared the company bankrupt on 11 March 2022, appointing lawyer Martin Gynnerstedt as the official receiver. Prior to the collapse, Uniti had repeatedly warned of its precarious financial position; in December 2021, the company announced it had less than a week to raise €500,000 to avoid insolvency. Despite intermittent inflows from investors, the company stated that continued reliance on short‑term survival funding created unsustainable external dependency and risk.

In April 2022, Uniti confirmed via LinkedIn that it had filed for bankruptcy “out of necessity,” citing its failure to raise the capital required to achieve its development goals. Alternative revenue streams and partnerships—including earlier collaborations with Siemens and E.ON—proved insufficient to keep the business viable. Although Uniti had generated significant early interest, including pre‑orders and international expansion plans, it struggled to deliver a production‑ready vehicle and faced increasing competition in a rapidly evolving EV market. Following the bankruptcy filing, the company’s assets—including prototypes, trademarks, and technical documentation—were offered for tender until 11 April 2022.

== Revival ==
After Uniti Sweden AB entered bankruptcy in 2022, the company’s assets were later acquired by an earlier investor who sought to revive the brand and restart development of its electric‑vehicle concept. The acquisition included Uniti’s intellectual property, design materials, and technical documentation, enabling the new owners to reestablish the company with a revised organizational structure and updated strategic direction. The relaunch aimed to continue development of the project under more stable financial and operational conditions.

Following the takeover, the company underwent a substantial leadership restructuring. British entrepreneur Paul Birch was appointed Chief Executive Officer, while Jonas Pinzke joined as Chief Marketing Officer to oversee brand redevelopment and communications. Marcelo Aguiar, who had already served as Uniti’s Head of Design prior to the bankruptcy, remained in that role and became the only member of the former organization to continue into the restructured company. Under the new leadership, Uniti emphasized clearer execution, a more focused product roadmap, and a pragmatic approach to bringing a next‑generation electric vehicle to market.

== Uniti One ==
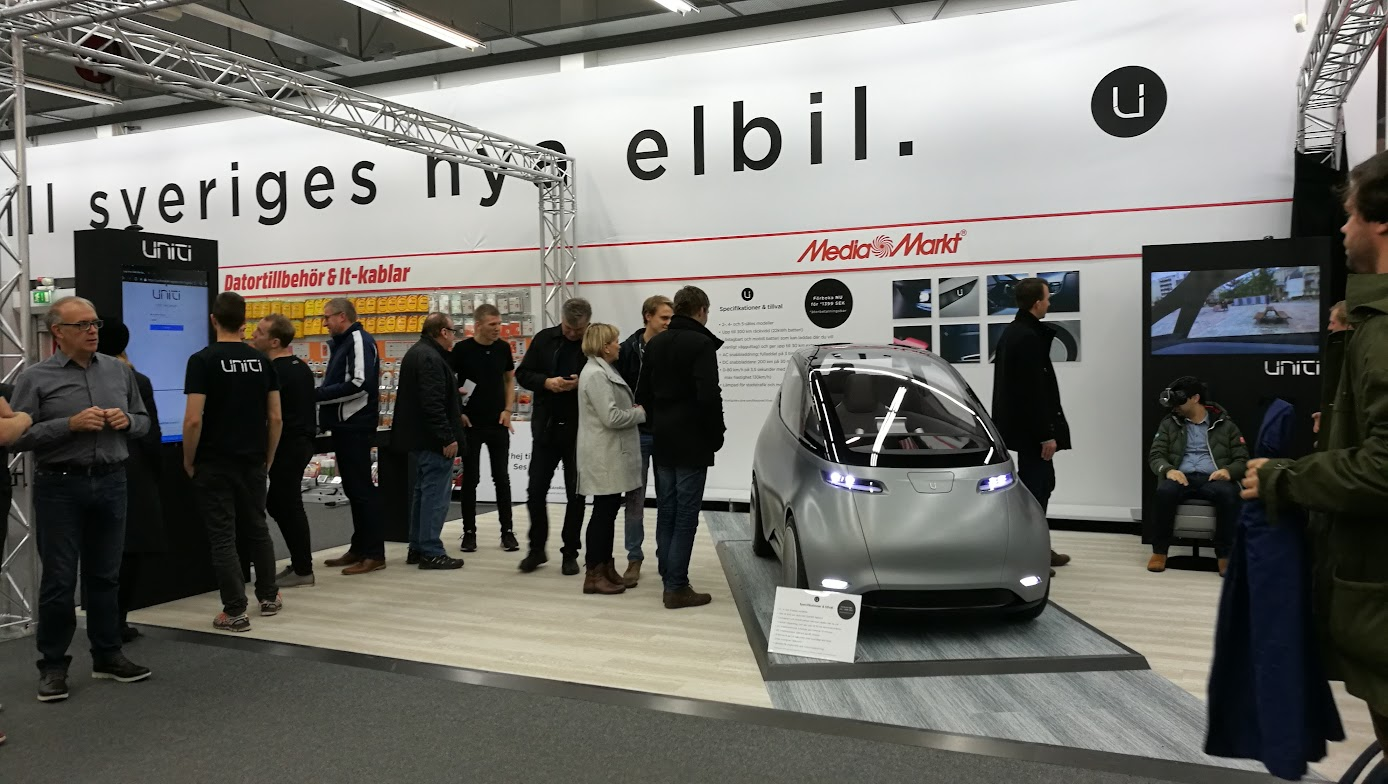
Uniti One prototype on display at MediaMarkt in Malmö, Sweden

Uniti publicly exhibited the one-piece cockpit concept, called Kepler Pod, for the first time during the 2016 CeBit event. The cockpit has been coupled with a virtual reality system to showcase the head-up display technology which was planned to be featured in the car. Different exterior design concepts have been displayed during early 2017.

Initially, the two-seater vehicle was designed to comply with the regulatory vehicle category of 450 kg heavy quadricycles (L7e), such as the Renault Twizy.

German industrial conglomerate Siemens has entered into a partnership with the group in 2017 to produce their Uniti two-seater electric car. The partners were planning to design a fully automated Industry 4.0 facility in Landskrona, Sweden, to produce as many as 50,000 cars a year beginning in 2018. They were also considering a production facility in Adelaide, Australia, for distribution into the Asian market.

The company in February 2018 showcased a two-seater at the Auto Expo in Greater Noida, India. They announced a partnership with the Delhi-based Bird Group to bring a five-seater car to the Indian market by 2020. The company published a video of the prototype in May 2018.

Uniti switched course from its Siemens partnership plans, and announced in late October 2018 plans to open its European pilot production plant at a business park in Silverstone, England, with 2-seaters expected in production by late 2019 or early 2020, followed a few months later by 4- and 5-seat versions.

In 2019, the specifications for the first production vehicle were announced, and orders were opened via the website, requiring a 50% deposit. It was a 3-seater, and planned to be produced in Norwich.

== Uniti Zero ==
In 2021, a new prototype was shown to investors, making use of the existing Chinese made Zhidou D3 with some minor cosmetic alterations. The Zhidou was manufactured by Geely and had been subsequently discontinued. Further investment was not forthcoming and the car never reached production.

== See also ==
- List of highest-funded equity crowdfunding projects
- Electric car
- Electric car use by country
- Automotive industry in Sweden
