= Nasser Saidi =

Lebanese politician and economist (born 1950)

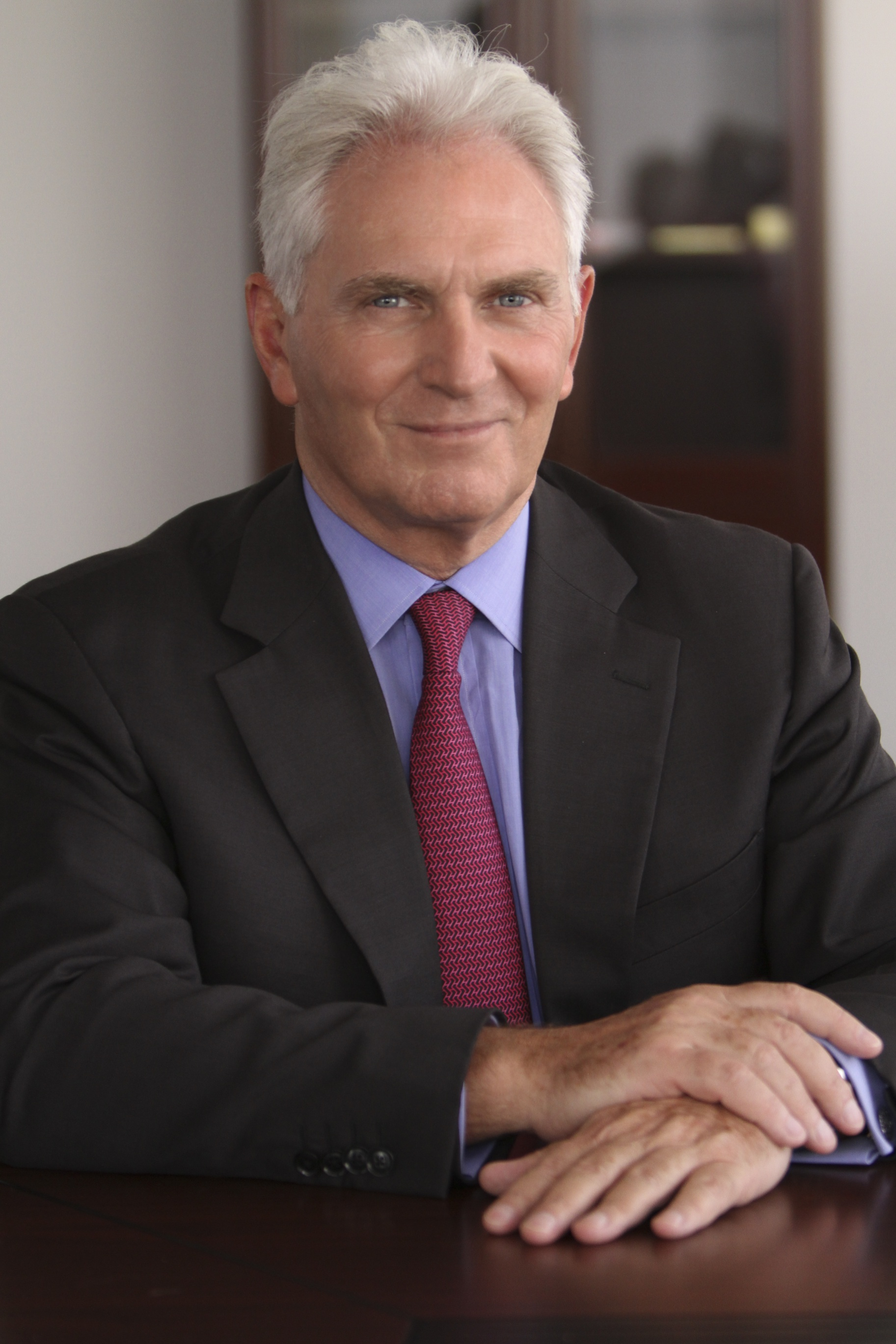
- Born: 7 October 1950 (age 75)
- Education: American University of Beirut; University College London; University of Rochester

Nasser Saidi (born 7 October 1950) is a Lebanese politician and economist who served as the minister of economy and industry and the vice governor for the Lebanese central banks for several terms in the last decade of the 20th century.

He is currently the founder and president of Nasser Saidi & Associates.

== Early life and education ==
Saidi was born on 7 October 1950. He received a degree in economics from the American University of Beirut in 1972. Next year he received a master's of science degree in economics from the University College London. He obtained another master's degree in economics from the University of Rochester in 1977. He holds a Ph.D. in economics from the same university which he earned in 1979.

== Early career ==
Saidi started his career as a professor, teaching economics at the University of Chicago (1977–1980) and after, at the University of Geneva and the Geneva Graduate Institute in Switzerland (1980–1985). He then joined the International Center for Monetary and Banking studies as an Associate and Lecturer in Geneva, Switzerland. He then became president of an economic advisory company called N.Saidi in London, United Kingdom, from 1985 to 1992. During this time he became a director and economic adviser at the Private Bank and Trust (1990–1992). Between 1995 and 1998, Saidi became chairman of Midclear, Lebanon's central securities depository and was the president of Beirut's Secondary Market in Lebanon. He acted as the lead negotiator of the EU-Lebanon Association Agreement from 1996 to 2000 and at the same time, held posts as president of the Commission for the Development of Banking Technology and IT (COBIT) and became the minister of economy and trade (1998–2000) in Lebanon. He then went on to take the First Vice Governor position and Banque Du Liban between 1993 and 2003.

He acted as the chief economist of the Dubai International Financial Centre and was also the executive director of the Hawkamah Institute for Corporate Governance. Also, he is on the advisory board of OMFIF where he is involved in meetings regarding the financial and monetary system. based in the Dubai International Financial Centre in Dubai. In these capacities he conceived and developed the role of the chief economist of the DIFC providing strategy & advice to the DIFC and Dubai Government; acted as spokesperson and developed a series of broadly disseminated publications, and promoted the DIFC internationally. He established and developed the external relations of the DIFC with international financial institutions (IMF, OECD, IFC, World Bank, MIGA) and international financial centres. Saidi designed and set-up DIFCSTAT, a secure, interactive, on-line, web-based, registration, reporting and statistical system for DIFC entities. As founder and executive director of Hawkamah Institute for Corporate Governance, he developed the regional institute to bridge the corporate governance gap through advisory services, research and advocacy.

In December 2012, Saidi became the deputy chairman of Eureeca.

Saidi is a member of the IMF's Regional Advisory Group for MENA and co-chair of the Organisation of Economic Cooperation and Development's (OECD) MENA Corporate Governance Working Group. He is a member of the Private Sector Advisory Group of the Global Corporate Governance Forum, an institution of the World Bank driving global corporate governance reforms. He is also chair of the regional Clean Energy Business Council, promoting clean energy solutions and policies in the MENA countries. He became an Accomplished Executive for Boardroom Metrics Arabia, which is a platform hub, specializing in talent and cross-referrals for independent consulting.

In 2012, he was named among the 50 most influential Arabs in the World by The Middle East magazine, for the fourth consecutive year.

He is a former minister of economy and trade and minister of industry of Lebanon (1998–2000). He was the First Vice-Governor of the Central Bank of Lebanon for two successive mandates, 1993–1998 and 1998–2003. He is co-chair with the OECD of the MENA Corporate Governance Working Group and established the Lebanon Corporate Governance Task Force. He was a member of the UN Committee for Development Policy (UNCDP) for two mandates over the period 2000–2006, appointed as a member in his personal capacity by former UN secretary general Kofi Annan.

He has written a number of books and numerous publications addressing macroeconomic, capital market development and international economic issues in Lebanon and the Middle East region.

== Publications ==
- “Corporate Governance in the MENA countries: Improving Transparency & Disclosure”
- “Weekly Economic Commentary”
