= Exporo =

Crowdfunding platform

Exporo AG
- Company type: Equity based Crowdfunding
- Industry: Real Estate
- Founded: 2014 in Hamburg, Germany
- Founder: Simon Brunke; Dr. Björn Maronde; Julian Oertzen; Tim Bütecke
- Services: Real Estate Investments
- Website: exporo.de

Exporo is a real estate crowdfunding platform, based in Hamburg, Germany.

== History ==
Simon Brunke, Björn Maronde, Tim Bütecke and Julian Oertzen founded the online platform in 2014, have continuously developed it further and are members of the Executive Board of Exporo AG. The company now has over 190 employees and is based in Hamburg's HafenCity. It had a funding volume of over 9 million Euros in August 2015. In December 2014, the company launched their online platform. In October 2017 with 61 million euro annual investments it occupied 60% of the German real estate crowdfunding market.

In January 2018, Exporo was the first crowdinvesting platform to launch a bond for its real estate project "Mitten in Hannover". The investment object consists of four existing buildings with 54 apartments and five commercial units in a central location in the state capital of Lower Saxony. The properties are held and managed by an Exporo subsidiary. Half of the financing is provided by investors and half by a bank loan.

In June 2019, Exporo received a 43 million euros funding by German and international venture capital investors. About half of the sum was invested by Partech, a globally active VC specialist, which holds stakes in Auxmoney and Acatus, among others. In addition, the former shareholders Eventures, Holtzbrinck Ventures and Heartcore also participated in the funding.

=== Internationalization ===
In August 2018, Exporo was offering its investors a real estate investment in other European countries. The project "Wohnen im 5. Bezirk" is located in the Margareten district of Vienna. Exporo investors financed EUR 1,690,000 with a fixed interest rate of 5.5% p.a. and a minimum term of approximately 16 months.

After successfully completing its financing round mid 2019, Exporo is since looking to further expand to other foreign countries, mainly targeting the French and Dutch markets. In October 2019, the exporo.nl platform was launched on the Dutch market. The French site exporo.fr was opened in March 2020. The model chosen internationally will be that of crowdinvesting, not crowdfunding. This means that individuals will have the possibility of acquiring bonds from already existing buildings and will receive payments from rental income every three months.

== Platform ==
Exporo was purposely built to serve self-directed investors instead of institutional ones. It offers investors an overview of real estate projects in which they can invest using their digital platform. Private investors benefit from two complementary product categories:

1. On the one hand, they can participate in high-yield real estate projects at short notice and at a fixed interest rate via Exporo Financing.
2. On the other hand, investors can participate directly in selected portfolio properties via Exporo Equity by receiving quarterly distributions from the rent surpluses and additionally participating in the real estate value.

== Feldbrunnenstraße ==
In April 2015, after 14 weeks of crowdfunding, their project “Feldbrunnenstraße” achieved the second-biggest real estate crowdfunding in Europe at the time with 2.1 Million Euros crowdfunding volume by 440 investors.

== Portfolio Marburg and Portfolio Marburg II ==
In November 2019 the real estate developer of the projects Portfolio Marburg and Portfolio Marburg II filed for bankruptcy. Approximately 4 million Euros were invested in the two projects. The platform exporo had ranked the projects with A and B respectively (on a scale from AA to F).

== Risks ==
Crowd-investors warn of the high default risks involved in crowdfunded loans.
