= Invivo Wines =

New Zealand winery

Coordinates: 37°24′28.84″S 175°8′24.37″E

Invivo & Co Limited
- Trade name: Invivo Wines; Invivo Wines NZ
- Type: Private
- Industry: Wine
- Founded: Auckland, New Zealand 2008
- Founders: Tim Lightbourne; Rob Cameron
- Products: Wine
- Website: www.invivowines.com

Invivo Wines is a New Zealand wine company, currently based in the historic Te Kauwhata winery south of Auckland. It produces wine in partnership with TV celebrities Graham Norton and Sarah Jessica Parker, and aims to appeal to casual wine drinkers by avoiding the sort of marketing its founders perceive is too pompous or flowery. Invivo wines have won several awards and trophies in various international wine competitions, and its unorthodox approach to fund-raising and marketing won it the 2009 New Zealand Innovation in Wine Marketing Trophy, as well as two trophies for their Invivo X, SJP global launch at the 2020 New Zealand Marketing Awards.

== Wines and other products ==
Invivo Wines has two main brands: the Invivo brand produces New Zealand Sauvignon Blanc, Pinot Gris, Chardonnay and Pinot Noir, from the Marlborough and Central Otago regions, including a higher tier range with a Michelle's label. Invivo's Marlborough Sauvignon Blanc won Winestates Sauvignon Blanc of the Year 2020. The Graham Norton's Own brand produces a New Zealand Sauvignon Blanc and Rosé, a South Australian Shiraz, an Argentinean He-Devil Red Blend, an Italian DOC Prosecco and DOC Rosé Prosecco, as well as two Gins - an Irish Gin in the London Dry style and a pink Gin. In 2019 Invivo entered a partnership with Sarah Jessica Parker to produce the Invivo X range, including a Marlborough Sauvignon Blanc and a Provençal rosé. Invivo X, SJP has received 90 points from Wine Spectator for their first two vintages of Sauvignon Blanc as well as being named one of the Top 100 wines in the world. Previously, Invivo also produced Belle, a label for low calorie, low alcohol Sauvignon Blanc and Rosé wines at 9% ABV, and a Scarlett's Spritzer range of sparkling natural fruit-infused drinks.

== History ==
Invivo began in 2007 as an idea between old school friends, winemaker Rob Cameron and Tim Lightbourne. Invivo discovered chat-show star Graham Norton was a fan of their Sauvignon Blanc and sent him some of theirs to try. As a result, Invivo and Norton began working together on a "Graham Norton's Own" branded range of wines, starting with a 2015 Marlborough Sauvignon Blanc. Invivo winemakers and Norton meet each year to blend the next vintage of the range, subsequently expanded to include other varietals. Norton is also a minor shareholder of Invivo Wines.

In March 2015, Invivo became the first New Zealand company to raise NZD $2 million of equity crowdfunding, the maximum amount allowed under New Zealand regulations, raised through the Snowball Effect platform. By 2018, Invivo became the largest equity crowdfunded company in the Southern Hemisphere having raised NZD $4.4 million.

In November 2021, Invivo became the first New Zealand wine company to launch a Non-Fungible Token (NFT), when they sold their first NFT 2 days after launch for 0.08 ETH (Ethereum) they became the first NZ wine company to sell an NFT.
