= FundedByMe =

Swedish crowdfunding website

- Website type: Crowdfunding
- Available in: Swedish, English, Polish, Finnish and Arabic
- Founded: 2011
- Headquarters: Stockholm, Sweden
- Industry: Finance
- Website: fundedbyme.com
- Current status: Closed

FundedByMe is a crowdfunding platform based in Stockholm, Sweden started by Daniel Daboczy, Arno Smit and Eric Weber. The company is active in Scandinavia with joint ventures in Finland, Poland, Malaysia, The Netherlands, Singapore and The United Arab Emirates (at the Dubai International Financial Centre - DIFC). FundedByMe's native language is English, but users can list their project in any supported language. The company was founded in March 2011 by Arno Smit and Daniel Daboczy. In September 2012, the company decided to focus their core business on equity crowdfunding instead of its original approach with donation and loan based crowdfunding portal.

== Summary ==
FundedByMe provides equity crowdfunding opportunities for entrepreneurs and investment opportunities for private investors. They launched their equity crowdfunding platform in October 2012. They have raised more than €72 million as of March 2021 from over 500 companies world wide.

In August 2018 FundedByMe acquired Laika Consulting, and financial communication and marketing firm as a subsidiary. And in March 2019 FundedByMe got listed at the NGM Nordic MTF stock market. The FundedByMe share (FBM MTF) can be found at Avanza or Nordnet, or your local custody account.

== Funding model ==
The FundedByMe portal operates on the "all or nothing" funding principle, where investments are made on a pledge basis and pledges are not released unless the project meets or exceeds a pre-set funding target, reaches 100% funded.

== Crowdfunding process ==
Projects or startups seeking funding are submitted to FundedByMe for review. If the project is accepted, it is listed on the platform as upcoming and once launched eligible for funding.

== Joint ventures ==
By 2019, FundedByMe is now a global platform operating in 6 global countries: Finland, Poland, Malaysia, Singapore, The Netherlands and The United Arab Emirates. In the UAE, FundedByMe MENA is incorporated at the Dubai International Financial Centre (DIFC), and is fully regulated by the Dubai Financial Services Authority (DFSA).

== Links to Greta Thunberg ==
FundedByMe has been utilized by environmental pressure group 'We Don’t Have Time' to enlist investors. On April 18, 2018, FundedByMe acquired Ingmar Rentzhog’s Laika Consulting, with Ingmar Rentzhog taking a role on the company’s board. Rentzhog is a communications specialist who is credited with much of Greta Thunberg's publicity.

== See also ==
- Comparison of crowdfunding services
- Invesdor
