= EquityNet =

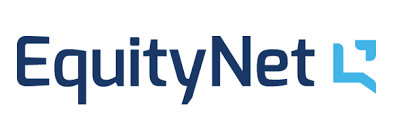
- Company type: Private company
- Industry: Crowdfunding
- Founded: 2005
- Headquarters: Salt Lake City, UT, United States
- Key people: Judd Hollas, Founder
- Website: www.EquityNet.com

EquityNet is a crowdfunding platform that helps privately held companies raise capital from accredited investors. Founded in 2005, the company is headquartered in Salt Lake City, UT.

== Model ==
EquityNet has operated one of the largest business crowdfunding platforms since 2005. The multi-patented EquityNet platform is used by thousands of individual entrepreneurs and investors, incubators, government entities, and other members of the entrepreneurial community to plan, analyze, and capitalize privately held businesses. EquityNet provides access to thousands of investors and has helped entrepreneurs across North America raise more than $500 million in equity, debt, and royalty-based capital. The company is not a registered broker-dealer and thus is not involved in the transfer of funds. Upon the U.S. Securities and Exchange Commission’s decision to lift the ban on general solicitation on September 23, 2013, EquityNet allowed businesses on its platform to use the new SEC rule and publicly advertise their need for funding.

As of 2020, EquityNet is majority owned by C9 Capital, a private equity firm based in Cedar Rapids, IA, and was primarily based out of Salt Lake City, Utah.

== Intellectual Property ==
EquityNet owns a portfolio of five granted patents that describe and claim various crowdfunding technologies, all of which are based on its priority patent application in 2005 before the word “crowdfunding” was first used. EquityNet’s patents include U.S. Patent 7,698,188 titled “Electronic Enterprise Capital Marketplace and Monitoring Apparatus and Method”; U.S. Patent 7,908,194 titled “Electronic Enterprise Analysis Apparatus”; U.S. Patent 8,484,110 titled “Electronic Enterprise Monitoring Apparatus”; U.S. Patent 8,793,170 titled “Electronic Enterprise Capital Marketplace Apparatus and Method”; and U.S. Patent 8,793,171 titled “Electronic System for Analyzing the Risk of an Enterprise.” EquityNet’s five patents describe a range of inventions within the private business domain for crowdfunding marketplaces, enterprise analysis, enterprise risk quantification, and enterprise monitoring.

== Awards and Recognitions ==
In April 2012, Forbes Magazine named EquityNet as one of "10 Companies Poised to Profit from the JOBS Act." In August 2012, Worth Magazine named EquityNet as one of its Top 10 Crowdfunding Sites. In January 2013, Crowdfunding Website Reviews included EquityNet in its "5 Equity Crowdfunding Sites to Watch in 2013."
