= Zinsland =

Zinsland c/o Civum GmbH
- Company type: Equity based Crowdfunding
- Industry: Real Estate
- Founded: 2014 in Hamburg, Germany
- Founder: Carl-Friedrich von Stechow; Dr. Stefan Wiskemann; Moritz Eversmann
- Services: Real Estate Investments
- Website: www.zinsland.de

Zinsland is a crowdfunding platform for real estate investments. It was founded in 2014.

== History ==
Civum GmbH is based in Hamburg and was founded by Carl Friedrich von Stechow, Moritz Eversmann and Dr. Stefan Wiskemann. Its first real estate financing platform Zinsland was launched in March 2015.

In 2018, Zinsland reached 50 million euros in funding volume. In 2019, with a portfolio consisting of three projects in the greater Düsseldorf area, Zinsland launched the first public bond on its platform.

Civum announced the development of Caladio in April 2019. David Werner became the new chief technology officer (CTO) to support Zinsland in building Caladio.

== Haus am Michaelsberg ==
With a total funding of 600,000 euros reached in only 12 minutes in January 2019, the real estate project "Haus am Michaelsberg" was the platform's fastest funding. Over 250 investors supported the building of 29 condominiums in Siegburg, Germany.

== Caladio ==
Caladio allows the Zinsland platform to be the first ever provider of a completely digital service for real estate financing, supporting every stakeholder in their process from credit application to credit reporting. At the same time, Zinsland is collaborating with the bank 'Taunus-Sparkasse' and real estate developers.

== Risks ==
Crowd-investors warn of the high default risks of crowdfunded loans.
