= Eureeca =

Equity fundraising platform

- Website type: Private equity fundraising website
- Founders: Chris Thomas and Sam Quawasmi
- Industry: Financial services
- Website: www.eureeca.com
- Commercial: Yes
- Launched: 2013

Eureeca is a British investment platform with a presence in Europe, the Middle East and South East Asia that allows small and medium-sized enterprises (SMEs) to raise capital from a group of investors, who range from individual investors to institutional firms, in exchange for equity. Eureeca serves as an alternative financing option to more traditional financing sources such as banks and venture capital firms.

== History ==
Launched in 2013 by Chris Thomas and Sam Quawasmi. By 2024 it had grown into a global platform with an investor network of 45,000 from 72 countries with an average investment size of US$5,800.00.

In September 2013 Eureeca co-founders Chris Thomas and Sam Quawasmi were presented with the "Innovator of the Year" award Gulf Business Industry Awards in the United Arab Emirates.

In December 2013, Eureeca was named "StartUp of the Year" at the first annual Arabian Business StartUp Awards in Dubai. In October 2016, Eureeca was named in the "Forbes Top 50 UAE Start Ups To Watch”, placing 3rd in the list.

== Model ==
Eureeca utilises an "all or nothing" fundraising model, which requires campaigners to hit their targeted fundraising amount during a 90-day campaign period in order to collect the funds. In the event that the target amount is not reached, members of the network who have already invested in the business will have their funds credited back to their Eureeca account for future use.

Eureeca has implemented a "Minimum Target" policy, which allows campaigners to specify a minimum target lower than their total one. This is based on milestones specified in the offering. Companies utilising this target will have it clearly marked on their proposals, and will be allowed to keep anything they raise beyond it.

== Regulations ==
Eureeca is authorised and regulated by the Financial Conduct Authority (FCA) in the UK. Eureeca SEA is authorised and regulated by the Securities Commission in Malaysia as a registered electronic facility (Equity Fundraising Platform) under s34 of the Capital Markets and Services Act 2007. The company is authorised to provide Equity Fundraising services and to hold client funds in the UK by the FCA.

== See also ==
- Nasser Saidi, Deputy Chairman as of December 2012
