= EnergyFunders =

- Type: Private
- Industry: Oil and gas
- Founded: 2013
- Headquarters: San Antonio, Texas
- Website: energyfunders.com

EnergyFunders is an energy-focused FINTECH crowdfunding company that started with oil and gas.

== History ==
The company was founded in 2013 by Philip Racusin, Roger Gingell, Michael Racusin, and Casey Minshew in Houston, Texas. It was set up as a crowdfunding platform. EnergyFunders initially provided accredited investors with access to upstream oil and gas projects from independent operators and producers. Generally these are established small operators that otherwise have limited financing options. The platform first went live in 2014 and was officially released in 2015. In January 2018, the EnergyFunders Marketplace was accepted by FINRA to operate a crowdfunding portal under Regulation CF. EnergyFunders launched an all-new upgraded platform using block-chain technology in early 2018.

== EnergyFunders platform ==
The EnergyFunders platform provides crowdfunded upstream oil and gas projects to accredited investors, which the company pre-vets before putting them up for offer through a team of various professionals in law, geology, technology, and finance. EnergyFunders takes a carried interest from each investment made through its platform.
