= AlphaCrowd =

Crowdfunding platform in New Zealand

- Trade name: AlphaCrowd – equity crowdfunding
- Industry: Investment banking
- Founded: January 2015, New Zealand
- Founder: Bart Janowski
- Website: https://www.alphacrowd.co.nz

AlphaCrowd is a New Zealand equity crowdfunding platform for digital and technology companies and investors, that was licensed by the Financial Markets Authority in October 2015. In November 2016, the company raised equity capital from a Chinese angel investor at a valuation of around $2.7 million; of the $800,000 raised a part was conditional on the investor being granted a travel visa to New Zealand.

== Board of directors ==
- Aaron Hockly
- Matthew Holdich
- Bart Janowski (Founder)
- Lasith Weeraratne

== Successful offers ==
- The Module Project – $207,000
- LazyAz – $240,769.20
