= MicroLoan Program =

American business loan program

The MicroLoan Program is a US Government program administered by the United States Small Business Administration (SBA) that provides microloans to start-up, newly established, or growing small business endeavors. The program has been operating since 1992.

It is especially designed to help those who might not find funding in the private sector, such as women, low-income, veteran and minority entrepreneurs. The program also provides support in marketing and management as well as technical assistance for microloan borrowers and potential borrowers.

Under this program, SBA makes funds available to non-profit community based lenders (intermediaries) that in turn, make loans to eligible borrowers in amounts up to a maximum of $50,000. The average loan size is about $13,500. Applications are submitted to the local intermediary and all credit decisions are made on the local level. The intermediary also assists by providing technical and management assistance. The maximum term allowed for an SBA micro-loan is six years. Loan terms, however, vary according to the size of the loan, the planned use of funds, the requirements of the intermediary lender, and the needs of the small business borrower. Interest rates vary, depending on the intermediary lender and costs to the intermediary from the U.S. Treasury.

== Micro Loans Rates ==
With microloans, borrowers can apply for up to $50,000 in funding. The requirements are a lot more lenient given that the total amount is far less than the typical SBA (7)(a). Other fees associated with the microloan include the application fee, loan processing fee, and the closing costs, which can add between 2 – 4% onto the loan itself. Microloans can never have longer repayment terms than 6 years, and most do not require collateral.
