= Alternative finance =

Alternative finance refers to financial channels, processes, and instruments that have emerged outside of the traditional finance system, such as regulated banks and capital markets. Examples of alternative financing activities through 'online marketplaces' are reward-based crowdfunding, equity crowdfunding, revenue-based financing, online lenders, peer-to-peer consumer and business lending, and invoice trading third party payment platforms.

Alternative finance instruments include cryptocurrencies such as Bitcoin, SME mini-bond, social impact bond, community shares, private placement and other 'shadow banking' mechanisms. Alternative finance differs to traditional banking or capital market finance through technology-enabled 'disintermediation', which means utilising third party capital by connecting fundraisers directly with funders, in turn, reducing transaction costs and improving market efficiency.

== Growth ==
Alternative finance has grown into a considerable global industry in recent years following the financial crisis, according to various reports, particularly for small and medium enterprises. For instance, the European online alternative finance market is estimated to have reached nearly €3bn in 2014, and is projected to reach €7bn in 2015. For the United Kingdom, according to the University of Cambridge and Nesta, the UK online alternative finance market reached £1.74bn in 2014. In comparison, the alternative finance markets in France and Germany reached €154m and €140m respectively in 2014.

== Regulation ==
Alternative finance activities such as equity crowdfunding and peer-to-peer lending are now regulated by the Financial Conduct Authority in the United Kingdom from 1 April 2014. Peer-to-peer lending investment will be eligible for an Innovative Finance ISA from 2016. In the US, under the Title II of the JOBS Act, accredited investors are allowed to invest on equity crowdfunding platforms from September 2013. The SEC then announced the updated and expanded Regulation A mandated by the Title IV of the JOBS Act to allow non-accredited investors to participate in equity crowdfunding.

== See also ==
- Bitcoin
- Crowdfunding
- Crowdsourcing
- Equity crowdfunding
- Monero
- Peer-to-peer lending
- Revenue-based financing
- Social impact bond
