= ArtFacts.Net =

ArtFacts.Net is the world's largest online art database, founded in 2001 by Stine Albertsen and Marek Claassen. The site had drawn criticism for its coverage and ranking methodology.

== History ==
Marek Claassen developed in cooperation with the Federal Association of German Galleries and Art Dealers e. V. and the Art Cologne trade fair database-driven websites, and systems for quickly creating exhibition catalogues. This was later done with GISI (Gallery Information System on the Internet) a virtual exhibition and archive system for galleries in Berlin, the forerunner of today's Artfacts art platform. Stine Albertsen (born 1978 in Copenhagen ) a co-founder of Artfacts, had initially worked for the Danish Embassy in Berlin before co-founding Artfacts in 2001.

With the founding of ArtFacts in 2001, the company began to systematically collect data on the (primary) art market . The focus is on the exhibition activities of artist and galleries who pay their fee report their individual and group exhibitions to ArtFacts after which ArtFacts aggregates them for the respective artists and exhibition institutions into an exhibition history. In 2004 Artfacts introduced ArtFacts Ranking which measures the artists' exhibition activities and illustrates them with graphs. According to NPR their methodology "fails to account for galleries that haven't paid a registration fee with ArtFacts.net, art fairs, publications, or auction sales, has caused a storm of controversy regarding the accuracy of his ranking system."

== Artist ranking ==
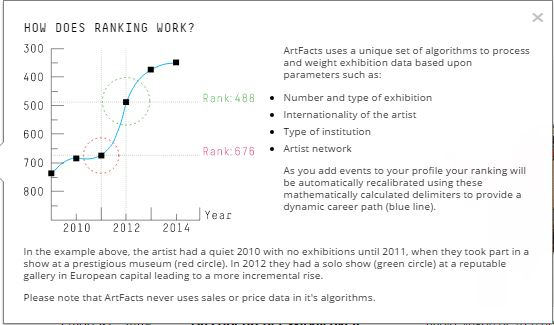
Beispiel Artist Ranking – wie funktioniert die Zuordnung von Ausstellung zur grafischen Darstellung

ArtFacts relates artists to one another using a complex algorithm that assumes that each exhibition carries a different weight in the art world. So e.g. For example, an exhibition at the Museum of Modern Art in New York is valued higher than one at a rural art club with few visitors. In addition to the exhibition activity, the algorithm also evaluates the reach, the quality of the institutions or collections and awards points. The accumulated points are displayed graphically so that the user can follow and compare the development of artists.

The theoretical background of this approach are, for example, the cultural-sociological studies of Pierre Bourdieu or Georg Franck 's book Ökonomie der Aufmerksamkeit from 1998. The ranking is controversially discussed in the art world: for example, the business magazine Capital publishes the top 100 artists once a year, based on data from Artfacts. Critically, it is seen that the depiction usually gives more weight to contemporaries and younger artists than to classics like Renoir or Rembrandt. But artists, too, repeatedly come up against the reduction of their activity to a mathematical depiction. Completeness of exhibition and art fair data may be better represented among contemporary artists and permanent displays of collections appear to influence the ranking less than solo exhibitions and some institutions influence ranking more than others.

The algorithm is critiqued quite widely for its lack of transparency and perhaps inbuilt biases towards German artists and galleries/museums due to the sampling and membership prevalence. There is acceptance that the platform provides great value to both artists, galleries and the art market despite the possibilities that international ranking may have some discrepancies from other ranking mechanisms. This potential bias may well be reduced as the impact of recent developments expand the use of ArtFacts.Net and their partners worldwide. The potential bias towards more contemporary artists over historic artists due to the lack of online availability of exhibition data, particularly of older exhibitions.
