= Angels Den =

Online investment platform

- Company type: FinTech, Technology
- Industry: Angel investing, Private equity
- Founded: 2007
- Headquarters: London, United Kingdom
- Area served: Worldwide
- Products: Matchmaking platform
- Website: www.angelsden.com

Angels Den is a platform which seeks to connect businesses with angel investors. Founded in 2007, it is headquartered in England.

== History ==
Bill Morrow, the co-founder and director of Angel's Den, trademarked the term "SpeedFunding" in 2008.

In July 2013 the runner-up of the BBC television series The Apprentice, Luisa Zissman, found 16 investors to fund her new business through Angels Den.

In October 2013, Angels Den launched an online platform and a rebranded website.

== Model ==
Angels Den is an "an angel-led crowdfunder". It provides various offline pitch events such as "SpeedFunding" events, where entrepreneurs present short elevator pitches to a number of investors on a one-to-one basis.

The Angels Den Tech Club, a co-investment fund, reportedly "focuses on high-growth [..] technology start-ups" which are eligible for the UK's Enterprise Investment Scheme.

== Activities ==
Companies that have raised funding through Angels Den have included:

Business	Amount Raised	Date
WhiskyInvestDirect	£1,076,472	May 2015
Stylect	£100,000	Feb 2015
NY Slice	£300,000	Dec 2014
Antaco	£213,840	Aug 2014
Beer 52	£100,000	Jan 2014

== See also ==
- Equity crowdfunding
- Private equity
- Venture capital
