= Snowball Effect (equity crowdfunding) =

- Logo
- Trade name: Snowball Effect
- Type: Private
- Industry: Private equity
- Founded: Auckland, New Zealand 2012
- Founders: Richard Allen; Simeon Burnett; Francis Reid; Josh Daniell
- Website: www.snowballeffect.co.nz

Snowball Effect is a New Zealand-based online investing marketplace, that enables New Zealand companies to offer shares to members of the public. Snowball Effect launched in August 2014, after being one of the first to acquire an equity crowdfunding license from the Financial Markets Authority. As of November 2020 over NZ$75 million has been raised on the platform.

Companies have a range of options when raising capital through Snowball Effect, including public offers, private offers, wholesale investor offers, debt offers, and bespoke capital raising. Snowball Effect offers companies a variety of services to support capital raising efforts, such as shareholder preparation, offer documentation and marketing, and lead investor sourcing.

Snowball Effect has also developed Orchestra, a platform which provides governance and shareholder tools for companies. Orchestra helps companies manage share registry and nominee management, shareholder communications, compliance, and employee share option plans. The platform also includes portfolio management tools for investors and allows lawyers and accountants to manage their clients’ compliance obligations efficiently.

== Board of directors ==
- Richard Allen
- Hayley Buckley
- Simeon Burnett

== Highlights ==
- Snowball Effect was one of the first two companies to acquire licensing from the Financial Markets Authority.
- Launched New Zealand's first equity crowdfunding offer, Renaissance Brewing, on 11 August 2014.
- Snowball Effect has raised over $75 million through more than 60 offers since launch.
- Invivo Wines has raised a total of $4.4 million through the platform.
- LINK Business Brokers has raised over $6.6 million through the platform.
- Zeffer has raised over $3.6m through the platform.
- AchiPro has raised over $10.6m through the platform.
- Little Island has raised over $3.2m through the platform.
- Snowball Effect begins private capital and wholesale investor services.
- Snowball Effect begins offering share registry services to all New Zealand companies.

== Notable Offers ==
The following is a list of notable offers that have been made through Snowball Effect:

- LINK Business Brokers: $6.6m
- Invivo Wines: $4.4m
- Zeffer: $3.6m
- Squirrel Group: $3.4m
- Designer Wardrobe: $2.6m
- ArchiPro: $2m
- Reefton Distilling Co.: $1.4m
- Aeronavics: $1.5m
- Punakaiki Fund: $2m (Public Offer, June 2015), $889k (wholesale, Jan 2016 as part of a $2,2m round) and $462k (wholesale, Jan 2016 as part of a $2.4m round)
