= Equity crowdfunding =

Type of investing

Equity crowdfunding is the online offering of private company securities to a group of people for investment and therefore it is a part of the capital markets. Because equity crowdfunding involves investment into a commercial enterprise, it is often subject to securities and financial regulation. Equity crowdfunding is also referred to as crowdinvesting, investment crowdfunding, or crowd equity.

Equity crowdfunding is a mechanism that enables broad groups of investors to fund startup companies and small businesses in return for equity. Investors give money to a business and receive ownership of a small piece of that business. If the business succeeds, then its value goes up, as well as the value of a share in that business—the converse is also true. Coverage of equity crowdfunding indicates that its potential is greatest with startup businesses that are seeking smaller investments to achieve establishment, while follow-on funding (required for subsequent growth) may come from other sources. Theoretical studies suggest that equity crowdfunding may be particularly useful for startups whose product or service is not yet "market-tested", so that the crowdfunding campaign itself can signal demand for the new product or service.

== History ==
Investment crowdfunding can be debt-based or equity-based. It can follow other models, including profit-sharing and hybrid models. The term equity crowdfunding is often used to describe crowd investing into both debt and equity based instruments when they are offered on an equity crowdfunding platform.

The first known baseline design of equity crowdfunding was proposed in the year of 2000 in Russia. The proposed business entity was supposed to operate the crowdinvesting processes, targeting those entrepreneurs, startups, and small businesses unable to issue securities. The platform, facilitated with a computer database, should provide information on the business plans and offer additional professional risk-assessment services to the investing audience. Also, it has been recommended that a policy maker to develop and enact legislation that promotes and protects the crowdinvesting practice. The concept suggested to sign the investment deals with the use of individual investment agreements for future profit or future equity. In 2013, such type of individual agreements was standardized to "SAFE notes" by Y Combinator.

The first known equity based crowdfunding platform was launched in 2007 in Australia, called the Australian Small Scale Offerings Board (ASSOB). ASSOB now trades as Enable Funding, a securities licensed equity raising platform that has raised over $150 million for 176 private companies. Over 78% of these companies were still trading profitably at the end of 2017. The first US. based company ProFounder launched a model for startups to raise investments directly on the site in May 2011, but deciding later to shut down its business due to regulatory reasons preventing them from continuing, having launched their model prior to JOBS Act. Early platforms include CrowdCube and Seedrs in the UK. Others like the European startup Exorot.com invest their own money in every new startup on top of investment received from others on their website.

Selling investments via crowdfunding has been called crowdfund investing, hyperfunding, crowdinvesting, or even simply crowdfunding, as in "legalize crowdfunding". Some have called for standardization of the terminology in a way that distinguishes the practice from other forms of crowdfunding.

Debt crowdfunding, also known as peer to peer lending or peer to business lending, allows a group of lenders to lend funds to individuals or businesses in return for interest payment on top of capital repayments. Borrowers must demonstrate creditworthiness and the capability to repay the debt, making it unsuitable for NINA or startups.

== Regulation ==
Investment crowdfunding can breach various securities laws, because soliciting investments from the general public is often illegal, unless the opportunity has been filed with an appropriate securities regulatory authority, such as the Securities and Exchange Commission in the U.S., the Ontario Securities Commission in Ontario, Canada, the Autorité des marchés financiers (AMF) in France and the AMF in Quebec, Canada, or the Financial Conduct Authority in the U.K. These regulators have different ways of determining what is and what is not a security but a general rule one can rely on (at least in the U.S.) is the Howey Test. The Howey Test says that a transaction constitutes an investment contract (therefore a security) if there is (1) an exchange of money (2) with an expectation of profits arising (3) from a common enterprise (4) which depends solely on the efforts of a promoter or third party. Any crowdfunding arrangement in which investors are asked to contribute money in exchange for potential profits based on the work of others would be considered a security. As such, the applicable investment contract would have to be registered with a regulatory agency, unless it qualified for one of several exemptions (e.g., Regulation A or Rule 506 of Regulation D of the Securities Act of 1933, or the California Limited Offering Exemption – Rule 1001 (also known as S.E.C. Rule 1001)). However, as of October 30, 2015, the SEC adopted Regulation Crowdfunding ("Regulation CF") under the Securities Act of 1933 and the Securities Exchange Act of 1934 to implement crowdfunding provisions of Title III of the JOBS Act. Title III added new Securities Act Section 4(a)(6), which provides an exemption from the registration requirements of Securities Act Section 5 for certain crowdfunding transactions. On January 29, 2015, the SEC opened up registration process to approve online platforms intending to legally solicit offerings through equity crowdfunding (Regulation CF). Online platforms operating under Regulation CF are expected to provide investment access via equity crowdfunding as early as mid-May 2016 (pending SEC approval). The penalties for a securities violation can vary greatly and depend on the amount of profit obtained by the "promoter", the damage done to the investors, and whether a violation is a first time offense. According to Section 5 of the Securities Act, it is illegal to sell any security unless such a sale is accompanied or preceded by a prospectus that meets the requirements of the Securities Act.

Crowdfunding is regulated to protect investors. Creators on crowdfunding platforms are often inexperienced and lack the ability to complete funded projects by agreed deadlines. Additionally, amateur investors are susceptible to fraud when they fail to verify projects and "free-ride" on other investors' funding histories. Above all, there is an overall risk of failure in early, platform-driven projects.

== International approaches to regulation ==
=== Argentina ===
Although it was admitted by the Civil Code, it was not regulated, a task that was recently carried out by the National Securities Commission (CNV), an agency that is the authority of control, regulation, control, and enforcement.

The Argentine crowdfunding model will flow through collective financing platforms, which must be in charge of a corporation authorized and registered by the CNV.

It must have a legal structure, statute and corporate purpose, name, registered addresses, shareholder registration, own website and email, among other requirements.

Among its activities, the corporate purpose should indicate that it puts in contact "a plurality of human and/or legal persons acting as investors with human and / or legal persons requesting financing".

=== Australia ===
Crowdfunding as a discrete activity is not prohibited in Australia when raising funds with donations. The provisions of the Corporations Act need to be considered if raising funds with either debt or equity.

The Australian federal government's now dissolved Corporations and Markets Advisory Committee (CAMAC) released its report on equity crowdfunding in May 2014. The report proposed a regulatory regime specifically designed for and to facilitate crowd sourced equity funding (CSEF) in Australia. The CAMAC report recommended Australia introduce legislation allowing retail investors to invest up to $10,000 a year in start-ups via equity crowdfunding, with a maximum of $2,500 in each company. It suggested companies be allowed to raise up to $2 million per year on such platforms.

In the 2015 Federal Budget, as part of its small business package, the government announced that it would make it easier for small businesses to access capital by allowing crowd-sourced equity funding and by simplifying related reporting and disclosure requirements. 'Treasury 'set aside $7.8 million in funding over four years to enable the Australian Securities and Investments Commission (ASIC) to implement and monitor the regulatory framework to facilitate the use of crowd-sourced equity funding when it is unveiled before the end of 2015.

Through 2016 and 2017 proposed amendments to the Corporations Act were debated and finally passed on 22 March 2017 in the form of the Corporations Amendment (Crowd-sourced Funding) Bill 2016 (Bill). The Bill provided 6 months for the Australian Securities and Investment Commission (ASIC) to enable the legislation and a further delay for licensing to occur.

On 11 January 2018 the first seven retail AFS Licences were granted to Big Start, Billfolda, Birchal Financial Services, Equitise, Global Funding Partners, IQX Investment Services and On-Market Bookbuilds.

Amendments expanding access to equity crowdfunding for (small) proprietary companies passed parliament into law on 28 September 2018.

=== Austria ===
Austria introduced a new law in August 2015 which specifically regulates crowdfunding and other alternative forms of investment. The law is meant to set a clear legal framework for crowdfunding to not only make this form of investment more accessible to entrepreneurs, but also to protect the investors better and prevent misuse. One campaign in Austria was introduced by Hanfgarten. In a single run, they gathered almost one million Euro.

=== Belgium ===
Local crowdfunding sites have been active in Belgium since 2011, and the legislation was adapted to cover them in April 2014. This made it possible to raise up to 300k€ per projects via crowdfunding as long as crowd investors' individual investments remained below €1000. Since this law adaptation was limited, regional governments have confirmed that further improvements of the legislation would remain a priority to address before 2019, and this was officially confirmed by the Flemish government in a published act.

=== Canada ===
Canada's first equity crowdfunding portal is Optimize Capital Markets which launched in Ontario in September 2009. In June 2013, the Ontario Securities Commission announced that it was allowing an Ontario-only portal for accredited investors. The province of Saskatchewan made equity crowdfunding legal in December 2013.

On May 14, 2015, the securities regulatory authorities of British Columbia, Saskatchewan, Manitoba, Québec, New Brunswick and Nova Scotia announced that they were adopting substantially harmonized registration and prospectus exemptions (the start-up crowdfunding exemptions) to allow start-up and early-stage companies in these jurisdictions to raise up to $500,000 per calendar year through online funding portals. These exemptions will be in effect until May 13, 2020.

=== China ===
On November 19, 2014, in the State Council address, prime minister Li Keqiang endorsed equity crowdinvesting as part of financial innovation to solve financing difficulties for small and medium enterprises. On January 20, 2015, the China Securities Regulatory Commission (CSRC) approved the first eight equity crowdinvesting platforms.

=== Cyprus ===
The Cyprus Securities and Exchange Commission updated their legislation in 2024 to regulate Crowdfunding firms offering CSP (Crowdfunding Service Provider) licenses to Cyprus Investment Firms. A public register is maintained on the CySEC government website listing all firms that possess the CSP sub-license. The oldest CSP licensed crowdfunding company in Cyprus is CrowdX, whose underlying company Eurivex has been offering stock market listings, pre-IPO and regulated fundraising services since 2012.

=== Estonia ===
The largest equity crowdfunded company in Estonia is Change, which has raised over €20M to-date. The first equity crowdfunding system was launched in August 2015 by Fundwise. There is no special law regarding crowdfunding but there is a Good Practice of Crowdfunding guidelines that were set up by Finance Estonia industry association and Deloitte in 2016. Estonia is home to the only equity crowdfunding platform in Europe that is licensed for trading of investments in a secondary marketplace, Funderbeam, which is licensed by the FCA (UK) EFSA (Estonia) & MAS (Singapore).

=== European Union ===
On October 7, 2020 the European Parliament approved EU Regulation 2020/1503 on European crowdfunding service providers for businesses (ECSP), which entered into force on November 10, 2021. From November 10, 2023, at the end of a transition period, the ECSP Regulation will definitively replace the national regulations of the countries belonging to the European Union.

=== Finland ===
An Equity Crowdfunding portal was launched in Finland in May 2012 by Invesdor. The legal issues around donation-based crowdfunding have been under debate in Finland as its legislation around this is different from most countries. However the legislation about Equity and Rewards-based Crowdfunding is more similar to the rest of Europe, and the legal situation is clear. Invesdor has also started operating in Sweden and has additionally opened its service to Danish and Estonian companies. The Sweden-based FundedByMe also launched their Equity Crowdfunding portal in Finland in January 2013.

=== Germany ===
After two smaller projects in 2010, 2011 can be considered the first successful year for crowdfunding in Germany. The largest crowdfunding project was launched by the company Brainpool in December 2011. For the movie of the successful TV series Stromberg, the company wanted to collect one million euros by March 2012, and the total amount was reached within one week. Companisto is the largest equity-based crowdfunding website in Germany.

=== Hong Kong ===
An equity crowdfunding platform may need to be licensed under the Securities and Futures Ordinance (Cap. 571) before it is permitted to carry on a business in, or actively market to the public any services that would constitute, a regulated activity in Hong Kong. In addition, the Securities and Futures Commission, Hong Kong's securities regulator, may impose certain legal restrictions or licensing conditions on equity crowdfunding platforms, such as the requirement to provide services only to professional investors (as defined by the Securities and Futures Ordinance and the Securities and Futures (Professional Investor) Rules (Cap. 571D)).

=== Ireland ===
Crowdfunding remains unregulated in Ireland. The law with regard to crowdfunding, and in particular equity based crowdfunding is complex. Issues to be resolved and regulations to be reviewed include:

- The Prospectus Directive (Directive 2003/71/EC) as transposed into Irish law by the Prospectus (Directive 2003/71/EC) Regulations 2005 (as amended) (the "Prospectus Regulations").
- The Markets in Financial Instruments Directive (MiFID) (Directive 2004/39/EC) as transposed into Irish law by the European Communities (Markets in Financial Instruments) Regulations 2007 (the "MiFID Regulations").
- The Investment Intermediaries Act 1995.
- The Consumer Credit Act 1995.

=== Israel ===
Israel has yet to enact legal framework for equity crowdfunding. Therefore, any equity crowdfunding activity is currently regulated under the Israeli Securities Law which permits the offering of securities to 35 non accredited individuals and an unlimited amount of accredited investors as defined in Israel Securities Law. The Israeli Securities Authority has proposed a new regulatory framework for equity crowdfunding in Israel, which has not been adopted yet. Some of the main terms are:

- An aggregate financing amount of up to ILS2 million over 12 months
- Limitation of the amount to be invested by each individual to ILS10,000 unless the investor is "wealthy"
- A sophisticated investor (as defined in the regulations) must contribute 10% of the total financing amount
- Office of Chief Scientist approval.

=== Italy ===
In July 2013, Italy became the first country in Europe to implement a complete regulation on equity-crowdfunding, which applies only to innovative startups and establishes, among other rules, a national registry for equity crowdfunding portals and disclosure obligations for both issuers and portals. The first equity crowdfunding campaign launched in Italy was a success, raising a total of €157,780 in three months, exceeding its initial target of €147,000.

=== Malaysia ===
In June 2015, the Malaysian Securities Commission (MSC) approved six equity platforms to begin operation by the end of the year. The approved platforms include Alix Global, Ata Plus, Crowdonomic, Eureeca, pitchIN and CrowdPlus .

=== Netherlands ===
In April 2011, Symbid was founded in the Netherlands by Robin Slakhorst and Korstiaan Zandvliet as one of the world's first investment crowdfunding platforms. In December 2014, the Netherlands Authority for the Financial Markets published 'Crowdfunding – Towards a sustainable sector' which provides insight into how the crowdfunding market in the Netherlands can develop into a sustainable one.

=== New Zealand ===
New Zealand enacted the legal framework for equity crowdfunding in 2013 and corresponding regulations in 2014. The regulations allow each New Zealand company to raise up to $2 million in any 12 months from the New Zealand public through a licensed equity crowdfunding platform without the usual offer document prescribed under securities law. PledgeMe and Snowball Effect were the first two platforms to receive licences Snowball Effect launched New Zealand's first equity crowdfunding offer in August 2014, with craft brewery Renaissance Brewing successfully raising $700,000 in 13 days. In March 2015, Invivo Wines became the first New Zealand company to raise $2 million, the maximum amount allowed under New Zealand regulations. In October 2015, the Financial Markets Authority licensed a new equity crowdfunding portal called AlphaCrowd that said it would focus only on digital and technology companies and would also aim to attract Chinese investors to New Zealand.

=== Poland ===
The activity of equity crowdfunding platforms on the Polish market has been specified by the Polish Financial Supervision Authority in May 2019. The platforms are not subject to special regulations, and can act on the basis of the Act on Entrepreneurs' Law, stating that the entrepreneur may take all actions except those prohibited by law. For a platform to allow to make investment decisions, it's obliged to provide detailed information about a financial instrument offered. Hence, it can be assumed that the equity crowdfunding platform acts as an "advertising column" enabling issuers to carry out only promotional campaigns.

The June 14, 2017 Regulation of the European Parliament and the EU Council raised a threshold for no-prospectus issues to the limit of EUR 1 million, every 12 months. The directive entered into force on July 21, 2018. However, according to the provisions of the EU directive, the Polish regulator may increase the limit to EUR 8 million. One of the first equity crowdfunding platforms in Poland and Central and Eastern Europe is Beesfund, founded in 2012. As of October 2019, 55 issues for a total amount of PLN 31.6 million (US$8 million) were collected on the platform, with the participation of 26,000 investors.

In February 2019, the idea of collecting equity money online gained significant media attention after the success of the offering of the football club Wisła Kraków. Within 24 hours, it raised PLN 4 million (US$1 million), as the fans became owners of over 5 percent of its shares. In 2020, the Warsaw Stock Exchange will launch its own equity crowdfunding platform named Private Market.

=== Portugal ===
The crowdfunding activities in Portugal had not been targeted by legislation until 2015. The first equity crowdfunding platform to receive the regulatory approval from the UK Financial Services Authority was Seedrs, co-founded by Portuguese Carlos Silva. SyndicateRoom another online UK-based equity crowdfunding was also co-funded by Portuguese Gonçalo de Vasconcelo. Some of Portugal's crowdfunding platforms are PPL, a donation and reward-based crowdfunding platform for funding every kind of projects, MassiveMov, founded in 2011 aiming to be a funding alternative for innovative projects and Raize, a debt-based crowdfunding platform. Novo Banco Crowdfunding is another initiative in partnership with PPL which aims to raise money for social projects promoted by NGOs and charities and are 10% co-financed by NOVO BANCO, founded in 2011 aiming to be a funding alternative for innovative projects. The Portuguese crowdfunding legislation, Lei 102/2015 de 24 de agosto Regime jurídico do financiamento colaborativo states that from now on crowdfunding will be monitored by CMVM(Securities Market Commission) and every platform needs to be registered at DGC (General Consumer Office). It recognizes four types of crowdfunding: donation, reward, equity and debt. According to the law, the investors can receive the money back if the announced conditions are not complied. CMVM is given 3 months to create the supervision norms and regulations to be applied in this area but the new rules apply only to projects that start after the publication of the law.

=== Singapore ===
Equity Crowdfunding currently falls under the Collective Investment Scheme which is regulated by the Monetary Authority of Singapore (MAS). MAS governs the crowdfunding activities under the Securities and Futures Act (Cap.289), and the Financial Advisers Act (Cap. 110). MAS controls equity-based crowdfunding the same way it controls debt-based crowdfunding. For both cases, the crowdfunding platform must have a Capital Markets Service (CSL) license. If a platform also wishes to offer advice to investors, it should acquire a license as a financial advisor.

=== Spain ===
In Spain, the new Law 5/2015 was signed to promote business financing and regulate crowdfunding. Most important Equity Crowdfunding platforms and authorized by Spanish supervisor in Spain are Flobers (equity and lending), Fundeen (equity and lending), Fellow Funders (equity), Housers (lending), Socios Inversores (equity), Capital Cell (equity), October (lending), Grow.ly (lending), Urbanitae (lending), Dozen (Before The Crowd Angel) (equity), MytripleA (lending), Adventurees and Startupxplore (equity)

=== Sweden and Norway ===
Crowdfunding portals have also launched in Scandinavia supporting both local language crowdfunding and English language crowdfunding. The oldest active crowdfunding platform in Sweden today is crowdculture launched in 2010. The system works with a unique hybrid mechanism where crowdfunding works as abase to crowdsource public investment decisions. The donation-based CrowdFunding portal FundedByMe has been active in Sweden and Norway since 2011, and Swedish crowdfunding activity is evolving in parallel to Crowdfunding in the US with Equity-Based CrowdFunding becoming active in Sweden late in 2012. Invesdor also started operating in Sweden in February 2013.

=== Switzerland ===
The oldest and most active crowdinvesting platform in Switzerland is investiere.ch. Crowdinvesting was responsible for 48% of the total money raised via crowdfunding in Switzerland in 2013. The Swiss Financial Market Supervisory Authority has not established specific regulations for crowdinvesting platforms. Instead, each platform is reviewed on a case-by-case basis to decide whether the platform requires a license to operate. In general, if the money raised is only brokered via the platform and not centrally pooled in any way, unlicensed providers are acting within the law.

=== United Kingdom ===
On 1 April 2014, the regulation of the consumer credit market transferred from the Office of Fair Trading (OFT) to the Financial Conduct Authority (FCA). This includes responsibility for regulating loan-based crowdfunding. The FCA has published a policy statement regarding crowd funding in March 2014.

Abundance Generation was the first debt crowdfunding platform in the United Kingdom (UK) to be regulated by the Financial Services Authority (now the Financial Conduct Authority). It was approved in July 2011 and was launched to the public in 2012. Abundance Generation provides democratic finance to UK-based renewable energy developers.

On 6 July 2012, Seedrs Limited was launched as the first equity crowdfunding platform to receive regulatory approval from the Financial Services Authority. In August 2012, Richard Branson announced his support for crowdfunding, crowdinvesting and crowdlending platform BankToTheFuture.com in the Telegraph newspaper. In February 2013, the CrowdCube equity crowdfunding platform, which was launched in 2011, was authorised by the FSA. On 18 March 2014, the first investor-led equity crowdfunding platform, SyndicateRoom, was authorised by the FCA. In May 2014, Crowd for Angels, which is considered the first debt and equity crowdfunding platform authorised by the Financial Conduct Authority (FCA), launched. In March 2015, Eureeca was the first international platform to receive regulatory approval from the United Kingdom's Financial Conduct Authority. In April 2017, Capital Cell, a specialist platform for biotech and life sciences crowdfunding from Spain, launched its subsidiary in the United Kingdom and received regulatory approval from the Financial Conduct Authority in September 2017.

=== United States ===
==== Equity crowdfunding platforms ====
Before June 16, 2015, equity crowdfunding (under Regulation D) was limited to individuals meeting certain net worth and income levels (accredited investors) and was conducted by a licensed broker-dealer (or funding portal). Notable platforms for accredited crowdfunding include Angel Studios, Wefunder, AngelList, EquityNet, CircleUp, SeedInvest, Manhattan Street Capital, and EnergyFunders. Payment processors like PayPal can also be used to raise capital for this purpose.

On May 16, 2016, Title III of the 2012 JOBS Act's Regulation CF came into effect which allows equity crowdfunding (also referred to as "Regulation Crowdfunding"), regardless of net worth or income. It must be conducted by a licensed broker-dealer or via a funding portal registered with the SEC. Even before the law came into effect, many crowdfunding services launched to fill this role. Early portal Profounder closed before SEC guidelines were released, and equity portal Earlyshares acquired charity portal Helpersunite. Wefunder and StartEngine were two of the first Funding Portals to be approved. Wefunder became the first successful platform to hit the $1 million raise maximum in the first months following the law coming into effect. A number of other portals have since launched, and many accredited crowdfunding platforms have entered the non-accredited market as well. As of 2017, 25 funding portals have registered with SEC and FINRA to operate in the United States.

Manhattan Street Capital is a Regulation A capital raise platform that supports offerings under Reg A+, Regulation D 506(c), and Reg D 506(b), including for Canadian issuers, and introduces companies to secondary markets such as the OTCQB, OTCQX, ATS-type venues, and direct listings to NASDAQ and NYSE.[S1] The platform operates its own back-end software system for processing investments, incorporating marketing integration and payment processing for issuer companies.[S1]

==== Federal legislation ====
Thanks in part to the crowdfunding exemption movement, the CROWDFUND Act was signed into law by President Obama on April 5, 2012, as part of the JOBS Act. The U.S. Securities and Exchange Commission has been given approximately 270 days to set forth specific rules and guidelines that enact this legislation, while also ensuring the protection of investors. Some rules have already been proposed by the SEC. The legislation mandates that funding portals register with the SEC as well as an applicable self-regulatory organization to operate.

Regulation A offerings places limits on the value of securities issuer may offer and individuals can invest through crowdfunding intermediaries. An issuer may sell up to $1,000,000 of its securities per 12 months, and, depending upon their net worth and income, investors will be permitted to invest up to $100,000 in crowdfunding issues per 12 months. An independent financial statement review by a CPA firm is required for raises $100,000–500,000 and an independent financial statement audit by a CPA firm is required for raises over $500,000.

Regulation CF offerings would prescribe rules governing the offer and sale of securities under new Section 4(a)(6) of the Securities Act of 1933. Individual investments in a 12-month period are limited to the greater of $2,000 or 5 percent of annual income or net worth, if annual income or net worth of the investor is less than $100,000; and 10% of annual income or net worth (not to exceed an amount sold of $100,000), if both annual income and net worth of the investor is $100,000 or more (these amounts are to be adjusted for inflation at least every five years); and transactions must be conducted through an intermediary that either is registered as a broker or is registered as a new type of entity called a "funding portal". In 2021 it was updated with revisions stating that the limits of a 12-month raise went from $1.07M to $5M. Currently lobbyists are looking to increase the limits to $10m over a 12-month period.

On October 23, 2013, the SEC approved regulations and opened a 90-day public comment period. In parallel to the SEC regulations, the Financial Industry Regulatory Authority (FINRA) adopted Funding Portal Rules for member firms engaged in crowdfunding, effective January 29, 2016. Regulation CF went into effect on May 16, 2016. FINRA evaluates and approves applications from funding portals.

==== State legislation ====
Some people see the federal crowdfunding legislation as unworkable, and several U.S. states have recently enacted or are considering their own crowdfunding exemption laws, to facilitate intrastate investment offerings that are already exempt from federal (SEC) regulation. These include the Invest Kansas Exemption, effective August 2011, and the Invest Georgia Exemption, effective December 2012, has $1m/$10k caps. Late in 2013, both Michigan and Wisconsin joined Kansas and Georgia. As of April 2013, the states of Washington and North Carolina are considering their own crowdfunding exemptions. In July 2012, the Wisconsin Department of Financial Institutions issued an advisory, about legislation proposed, intended to allow crowdfunding to raise up to $1 million from non-accredited Wisconsin investors without audited financial statements, or up to $2 million if the issuer has audited financial statements.

==== Crowdfunding insurance ====
The draft SEC rules calls for portals to purchase a fidelity bond of at least $100,000. As stated by the SEC, a "fidelity bond .. aims to protect its holder against certain types of losses, including but not limited to those caused by malfeasance of the holder's officers and employees, and the effect of such losses on the holder's capital". A fidelity bond generally covers a corporate policyholder from first party losses arising from the theft of money, securities or other tangible property so if the portal's employees steal the funds belonging to the crowdfunding company, the bond can be useful. However, if there is a claim against the portal for negligence in providing its services as a portal, the more proper insurance policy to apply to this loss is a professional liability insurance. Directors and Officers insurance can protect those that own and govern the portal.

The final SEC rules waived this requirement.

== See also ==
- Alternative Finance
- Angel investor
- Comparison of crowd funding services
- Crowdsourcing
- List of highest funded equity crowdfunding projects
- Private equity
- Revenue-based financing
- Securities offering
- Seed money
- Venture capital financing
- Venture round
