= Birchal =

Australian equity crowdfunding platform

- Company type: Private
- Industry: Equity crowdfunding
- Founded: 2017
- Headquarters: Melbourne, Victoria, Australia
- Key people: Kirstin Hunter CEO; Matthew Vitale Co-founder; Alan Crabbe Co-founder
- Website: birchal.com

Birchal is an Australian equity crowdfunding platform that has hosted over 300 successful CSF offers, raising approximately $218m and facilitated over 130 thousand investments.

Birchal is licensed by the Australian Securities & Investments Commission to facilitate offers of equity in eligible unlisted public or private companies to both retail and wholesale investors under the crowdsourced funding regime of the Corporations Act, which was introduced in 2017. It was part of the first group of seven such intermediaries issued a license in early January 2018.

Birchal offered its own shares on its platform in April 2022, reaching the maximum funding target of AU$3 million in slightly over an hour, with almost 600 investors participating.

== History ==
Birchal was founded in 2017 as a sister platform to Pozible, a reward-based crowdfunding platform, by its mutual founders. The firm commenced by targeting Pozible's user base to capitalise on new Australian equity crowdfunding regulations enacted in 2018.

In January 2025, Matthew Vitale stepped down as CEO to prioritise his health and well-being. Kirstin Hunter initially took over as CEO Transition Lead and was officially appointed CEO in March 2025.
