= Invesdor =

Finnish crowdfunding platform

- Website type: Financial services, crowdfunding
- Founded: 2012
- Headquarters: Berlin Helsinki Vienna Amsterdam, {{{location_country}}}
- CEO: Christopher Grätz
- Managing director: Christopher Grätz, Mari Lymysalo; Ellen Hensbergen
- Industry: Financial servides, Crowdfunding
- Website: www.invesdor.com
- Commercial: Yes

Invesdor is a European crowdfunding and digital investment platform. It originated as a Finnish securities crowdfunding platform founded in 2012 and later expanded through mergers with Finnest, Kapilendo and Oneplanetcrowd. The platform has offered debt and equity crowdfunding services, and Invesdor GmBH has been authorized in Austria as a crowdfunding service provider under Regulation (EU) 2020/1503.

== History ==
Invesdor was founded in Finland in 2012 as an equity-based crowdfunding platform. In 2015, Invesdor had obtained a license allowing it to offer debt and equity crowdfunding services across EU and EEA countries without applying for a separate local operating license in each country.

In 2017, Invesdor launched its first Swedish campaign through Sharpfin, a Swedish wealth management software company. It was the first Swedish campaign launched through Finland's Invesdor.

In 2019, Invesdor merged with Finnest, an online lender serving companies in the DACH region. In 20121, Kapilendo, Finnest and Invesdor were consolidated under the Invesdor brand.

In 2022, Invesdor Group and Oneplanetcrowd announced a merger. the combined entities had a total of €438 million in funding, 800 project and 170,000 individual investors at the time of the announcement.

In January 2023, Austria's Financial Market Authority granted Invesdor GmBH authorization as a crodfunding service provider under Regulation (EU) 2020/1503.

== Business model ==
Invesdor operates an online platform connecting companies seeking financing with investors. The platform matches service between investors and companies, while the Invesdor GmBH is authorized to place transferable securities with a firm commitment basis and to receive and transmit client orders relating to those securities.

== Selected Campaigns ==
In 2014, Iron Sky Universe used Invesdor for an equity crowdfunding campaign connected to the Iron Sky franchise. The campaign raised $200,000 through Invesdor and 300% of its minimum goal during its first day.

In 2015, Cityvarasto used Invesdor for an equity crowdfunding campaign. The campaign raised €673,000 from 237 investors.

In 2017, Sharpfin raised SEK 2.2 million through Invesdor which was Invesdor's first Swedish campaign.

In 2018, cryptocurrency Prasos raised €2.5 million through an equity crowdfunding campaign on Invesdor. EU- Startups reported that the campaign ended 12 days before its scheduled closing date.

In 2024, Windpark Fryslân raised €27 million through Invesdor securities offering. The offering raised €6 million during its first day, and the available bond value capped at €10 million.

In 2026, Belgian precision-fermentation company Those Vegan Cowboys raised €2.5 million in one day through an Invesdor-hosted crowdfunding campaign. The campaign reached €1 million within one hour and later passed €6.7 million from 1,100 shareholders.

== See also ==
- Comparison of crowd funding services
