= Companisto =

Equity-based crowdfunding website

Companisto GmbH
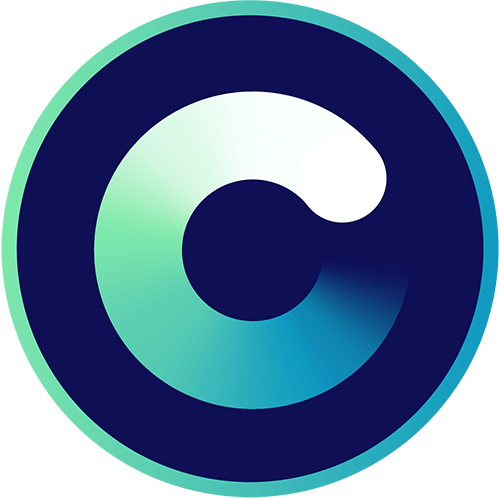
- Company type: Private
- Industry: Financial services
- Founded: Berlin, Germany (June 2012)
- Headquarters: Berlin, Germany
- Number of locations: 2
- Key people: David Rhotert and Tamo Zwinge, CEO
- Products: Venture capital
- Number of employees: 57 (2019)
- Website: companisto.com

Companisto is a German equity-based business angel network. It allows investors to invest in startup companies. In return, they become shareholders and are entitled to a share of any profits, as well as potentially benefiting from an exit.

As of 2019, Companisto had over 175.000 investors (including the biggest Business Angel Network in Europe with over 4.000 members) from 92 countries. It was Germany's largest network for investments in start-ups and growth companies.

== History ==
Companisto was founded by the lawyers David Rhotert and Tamo Zwinge in June 2012, in Berlin. Companisto investors funded 18 startups in the first twelve months. As of April 10, 2014, 29 startups were funded with a collective amount of 5 Million € by investors from 47 different countries.

In July, 2014 Weissenhaus raised 1.2 Million € in first 3.5 days in Europe's first ever real estate crowdfunding. In August, 2014 it reached 4 Million €, making it the biggest crowdinvesting in Europe. Since March, 2014, the English-language site has allowed submissions from any business based in Europe, and investments from anywhere in the world.

In December 2015 Companisto exceeded €25M in funding, in December 2016 Companisto exceeded $36M in funding, in Mai 2018 Companisto exceeded €50M in funding.

All Companisto supported Startups together created over 1200 new jobs. Companisto is market leader in D-A-CH (Germany, Austria and Switzerland).

In March 2019 Companisto announced Equity Investment, meaning that investors can now become real company shareholders. Investors are no longer limited to €10,000 and total investment is no longer limited to $2.4 million.

As of August 2025, 430 startups were funded with a collective amount of 300 Million €.
