= Revenue-based financing =

Type of funding

Revenue-based financing (also known as royalty financing or royalty-based financing) is a type of financial capital provided to growing businesses in which investors inject capital (sometimes called an advance) into a business in return for a fixed percentage of ongoing gross revenues (called royalties), with payment increases and decreases based on business revenues, typically measured as monthly revenue.

It is a non-dilutive form of financing, which means that the company's management retains complete independence and control, as there is no equity investment or impact on the company's shareholding. Usually, the returns to the investor continue until the initial capital amount, plus a multiple (also known as a cap) is repaid. Generally, RBF investors expect the loan to be repaid within 1 to 5 years of the initial investment depending on the model and the funded companies.

== Overview ==
RBF is often described as sitting between a bank loan, typically requiring collateral or significant assets, and venture capital, which involve selling an equity portion of the business in exchange for the investment. In an RBF investment, investors do not take an upfront ownership stake (equity) in the business. RBF investments usually do not require a seat on the company's board of directors, and no valuation exercise is necessary to make the investment. Nor does RBF require the backing of the loan by founder's personal assets.

While revenue-based financing has been used to finance SaaS companies, it is also used to finance D2C and e-commerce businesses.

== History ==
RBF has long been used in the energy industries as a type of debt financing. In the late 1980s, Arthur Fox pioneered this funding model for early-stage businesses in New England. Seeing some initial success, he began a small RBF fund in 1992, which was found to perform on-par with expectations for the alternative assets industry, yielding an IRR of over 50%. In 2011, he began licensing his proprietary RBF financing model to enable new RBF funds to form.

Some RBF firms have a geographic-focused model while other firms take a more nationwide approach.

== Comparison ==
RBF can provide significant advantages to entrepreneurs and businesses. The nature of RBF, however, requires that businesses have two key attributes. First, the business must be generating revenue, as it will be from that revenue that payments are made. Second, the business should have reasonably good gross margins to accommodate the percentage of revenue dedicated to loan payments.

The interests of an RBF investor align with the interests of the companies in which they invest. Both parties benefit from revenue growth in the business; both parties suffer when revenue declines. This is in contrast to a typical bank loan, which has a fixed monthly payment over the life of the loan regardless of business revenue. RBF helps manage rough months in the business by having a payment that traces revenue.

Cost of capital is an important consideration for entrepreneurs raising money. Usually the cost of capital in an RBF investment is significantly less than a similar equity investment, for several reasons: First, the actual interest rate on the loan is much lower than the effective interest rate required by an equity investor on their invested capital if the business should be sold. Second, legal fees are lower than with equity financing. Third, because the investment is a loan, the interest payments can often be a tax deduction for the business.

This cost of capital savings is a result of the RBF model and nature of the risk taken by the investor. Because the loan is making payment each month, the RBF investor does not require the eventual sale of the business in order to earn a return. This means that they can afford to take on lower returns in exchange for knowledge that the loan will begin to repay far sooner than if it depended on the eventual sale of the business.

RBF often is more expensive than bank financing, However, few early-stage businesses seeking growth capital will have an asset base to support a commercial loan. Most banks will therefore require a guarantee from the founders of a business that, in the event of default, the bank can pursue their personal assets.

== See also ==
- Income share agreement – an income-based financing arrangement for individuals
- Royalty payment
