= Seedrs =

Equity crowdfunding platform

Seedrs Limited
- Company type: Subsidiary
- Industry: Crowdfunding
- Founded: 16 March 2009; 16 years ago
- Founders: Jeff Lynn, Carlos Silva
- Headquarters: London, United Kingdom
- Area served: UK, Europe
- Key people: Jeff Kelisky (CEO)
- Parent: Republic
- Website: Official website

Seedrs Limited is an online equity crowdfunding company, headquartered in East London's Tech City, founded in 2009 and launched by Jeff Lynn and Carlos Silva in 2012. Since 2022 it has been a subsidiary of American crowdfunding company Republic.

In 2020, Seedrs announced that 250 startups had raised funding through its crowdfunding platform during 2019. By 2022, Seedrs reported that over £1.9 billion had been invested through the company.

== History ==
The company was founded in 2009 by Jeff Lynn and Carlos Silva as part of an MBA project at the Saïd Business School at the University of Oxford.

In March 2012, Seedrs raised $1 million in seed funding from private investors including venture capital firm Draper Esprit.

In May 2012, Seedrs became the first equity crowdfunding platform to receive regulatory approval from the Financial Conduct Authority.

In July 2012, Seedrs launched its platform to the public.

In November 2013, Seedrs raised £750,000 in funding through its own platform.

In June 2015, professional tennis player Andy Murray joined Seedrs in an advisory role, having previously used the platform as an investor.

In June 2017, Seedrs launched a secondary market, becoming the first equity crowdfunding platform to allow investors to buy and sell shares in unlisted companies.

In August 2017, Jeff Lynn stepped down as CEO to take up a position as Executive Chairman. Former COO Jeff Kelisky was promoted to CEO.

In August 2017, Seedrs raised £4 million investment for challenger bank Revolut.

In October 2017, Seedrs announced it had raised £10 million in funding.

In December 2018, Seedrs launched a venture capital fund aimed at passive startup investors.

In August 2019, Seedrs raised £4.5 million in funding.

In 2020, Seedrs and Crowdcube agreed to a merger. This was abandoned on 25 March 2021 after the Competition and Markets Authority raised concerns about the deal.

In December 2021, Seedrs announced that it had agreed to be acquired by Republic, a US-based equity crowdfunding platform, for $100 million. The acquisition was criticised by some of Seedrs' small investors over preferential treatment given to large shareholders.
