= Threshold pledge system =

Fundraising method

The threshold pledge or fund and release system is a way of making a fundraising pledge as a group of individuals, often involving charitable goals or financing the provision of a public good. An amount of money is set as the goal or threshold to reach for the specified purpose and interested individuals will pitch in, but the money at first either remains with the pledgers or is held in escrow.

When the threshold is reached, the pledges are called in (or transferred from the escrow fund) and a contract is formed so that the collective good is supplied; a variant is that the money is collected when the good is actually delivered. If the threshold is not reached by a certain date (or perhaps if no contract is ever signed, etc.), the pledges are either never collected or, if held in escrow, are simply returned to the pledgers. In economics, this type of model is known as an assurance contract.

This system is most often applied to creative works, both for financing new productions and for buying out existing works; in the latter cases, it is sometimes known as ransom publishing model or Street Performer Protocol (SPP).

== History ==
The Street Performer Protocol is a natural extension of the much older idea of funding the production of written or creative works through agreements between groups of potential readers or users.

The first illustrated edition of John Milton's Paradise Lost was published under a subscription system; and Mozart and Beethoven, among other composers, used subscriptions to premiere concerts and first print editions of their works. Unlike today's meaning of subscription, this meant that a fixed number of people had to sign up and pay some amount before the concert could take place or the printing press started.

These three (piano) concertos K413-415 ... formed an important milestone in his career, being the first in the series of great concertos that he wrote for Vienna, and the first to be published in a printed edition. Initially, however, he followed the usual practice of making them available in manuscript copies. Mozart advertised for subscribers in January 1783: "These three concertos, which can be performed with full orchestra including wind instruments, or only a quattro, that is with 2 violins, 1 viola and violoncello, will be available at the beginning of April to those who have subscribed for them (beautifully copied, and supervised by the composer himself)." Six months later, Mozart complained that it was taking a long time to secure enough subscribers. This was despite the fact that he had meanwhile scored a great success on two fronts:...

However, there are a number of differences between this traditional model and the SPP. The most important difference is that traditionally, the subscribers would be among the first to get access and would do so with the understanding that the work would likely always be a "rare" good; thus, there was some status in owning a copy, as well as the prestige of being among the patrons. Additionally, subscriptions were generally sold at a set price, but some wealthy subscribers may have given more in order to be a patron. In the modern Street Performer Protocol, each funder chooses the amount they want to pay, and the work is released to the public and freely reproduced.

In 1970, Stephen Breyer argued for the importance of this model in "The Uneasy Case for Copyright".

The Street Performer Protocol was successfully used to release the source code and brand name of the Blender 3D animation program. After NaN Technologies BV went bankrupt in 2002, the copyright and trademark rights to Blender went to the newly created NaN Holding BV. The newly created Blender Foundation campaigned for donations to obtain the right to release the software as free and open source under the GNU General Public License. NaN Holding BV set the price tag at 100,000 euros. More than 1,300 users became members and donated more than 50 euros each, in addition to anonymous users, non-membership individual donations and companies. On October 13, 2002, Blender was released on the Internet as free software.

Variations of the SPP include the Rational Street Performer Protocol and the Wall Street Performer Protocol.

== Street Performer Protocol ==
Street Performer Protocol is an early description of a type of threshold pledge system. SPP is the threshold pledge system encouraging the creation of creative works in the public domain or copylefted, described by Steven Schear and separately by cryptographers John Kelsey and Bruce Schneier. This assumes that current forms of copyright and business models of the creative industries will become increasingly inefficient or unworkable in the future, because of the ease of copying and distribution of digital information.

Under the Street Performer Protocol, the artist announces that when a certain amount of money is received in escrow, the artist will release a work (book, music, software, etc.) into the public domain or under a free content license. Interested donors make their donations to a publisher, who contracts with the artist for the work's creation and keeps the donations in escrow, identified by their donors, until the work is released.

If the artist releases the work on time, the artist receives payment from the escrow fund. If not, the publisher repays the donors, possibly with interest. As detailed above, contributions may also be refunded if the threshold is not reached within a reasonable expiring date. The assessed threshold also includes a fee which compensates the publisher for costs and assumption of risks.

The publisher may act like a traditional publisher, by soliciting sample works and deciding which ones to support, or it may serve only as an escrow agent and not care about the quality of the works (like a vanity press).

== Ransom model in software ==
In software, source code escrow is a publishing model that applies the SPP to source code (often involving existing proprietary software) which is eventually released under an open source or free software license.

== List of threshold-pledge websites ==
- Community Funded - A crowdfunding platform-oriented threshold-pledge website (threshold-pledge currently disabled)
- GlobalGiving - A project-oriented threshold-pledge website
- IndieGoGo - A project-oriented threshold-pledge website
- Kickstarter - A project-oriented threshold-pledge website
- PledgeBank - An honor system fund and release website
- PledgeMusic - A direct-to-fan music funding website
- RocketHub - An international project-oriented pledge website
- Sellaband - A crowdfunding music funding website
- Tides Center - A project-oriented threshold-pledge website
- Patreon - A crowdfunding platform providing "recurring funding for artists and creators"

== See also ==
- Assurance contract
- Contingency market
- Copyright social conflict
- Crowdfunding
