= Play Business =

- Company type: Private company
- Industry: Investing
- Founded: 2014; 11 years ago
- Founder: Marc Oyamburu
- Headquarters: Mexico City, Mexico
- Area served: Mexico
- Products: Crowdfunding for startups
- Website: playbusiness.mx

Play Business was a Mexican crowdfunding company for start-ups based in Mexico. It used a business model that aims to differ from competing crowdfunding sites. It offered equity in the start-up instead of direct compensation for investors. The company suspended new investments after 2021 to focus on its active portfolio.

== History ==
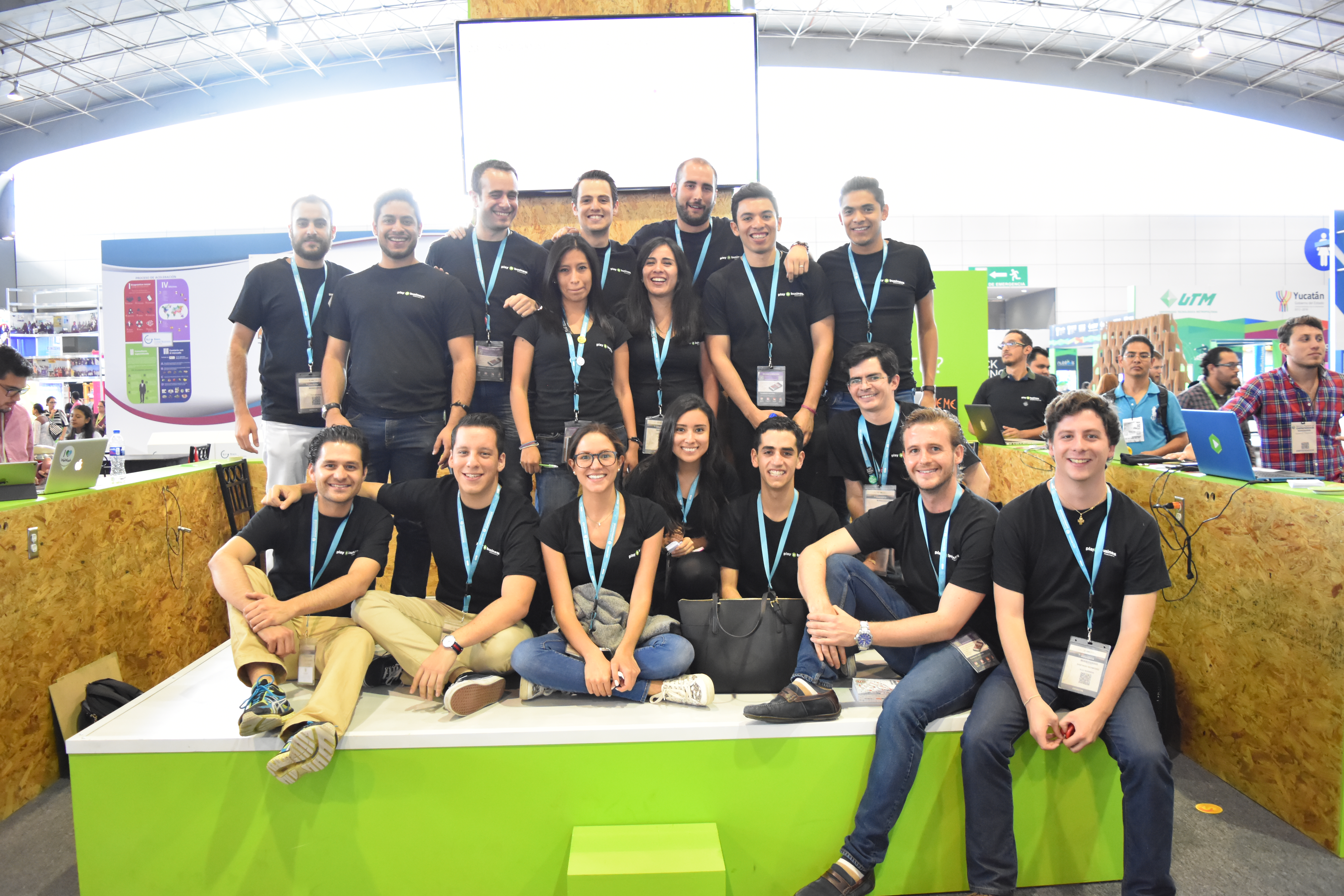
Play Business team as of 2017.

Started in 2014, the site was co-founded by Joan Segura (currently the general director), Fernanda de Velasco, and Marc Oyamburu. Oyamburu's and Segura's experience with video games is behind the idea of the site; both are involved in playing, critiquing, and creating game worlds. As a college student, Oyamburu came across the idea of gamification of real world activities, which is behind the name Play Business. Oyamburu is a lawyer and economist, which allowed him to develop the idea despite being told it could not be done for legal or financial reasons.

The business started with an initial investment of 200,000 pesos, most of which went into paying for servers and the development of the site. The website officially went online in March 2015, while the company was still using the laundry room of Joan Segura's parents' house. The company grew 700% in its first year and 300% and 100% in the following years. The company expanded and was able to rent larger space to allow for offices and moved located in the Condesa neighborhood of Mexico City.

In February 2015, the platform reached its beta version. After the election of President Trump at the end of 2016, the site saw a sudden increase in participation. In thirteen days, projects garnered six million pesos, breaking a record.

In October 2016, Startup Studio Monterrey signed a contract to collaborate with Play Business. Playbook management has stated that it has not grown to the level of other online funding sites due to a lack of funding. The platform also made alliances with organizations that provide investment and other support to start-ups.

By April 2018, the site had 50,000 registered users and had provided over 115 million pesos to support the projects of more than 85 start-ups. Its first client was Briko Robotics, with a goal of 645,000 pesos, and even financed itself in part through its own site. The startup also supported Tumbiko, a jewelry enterprise that now employs about 1,000 people.

== Business model ==
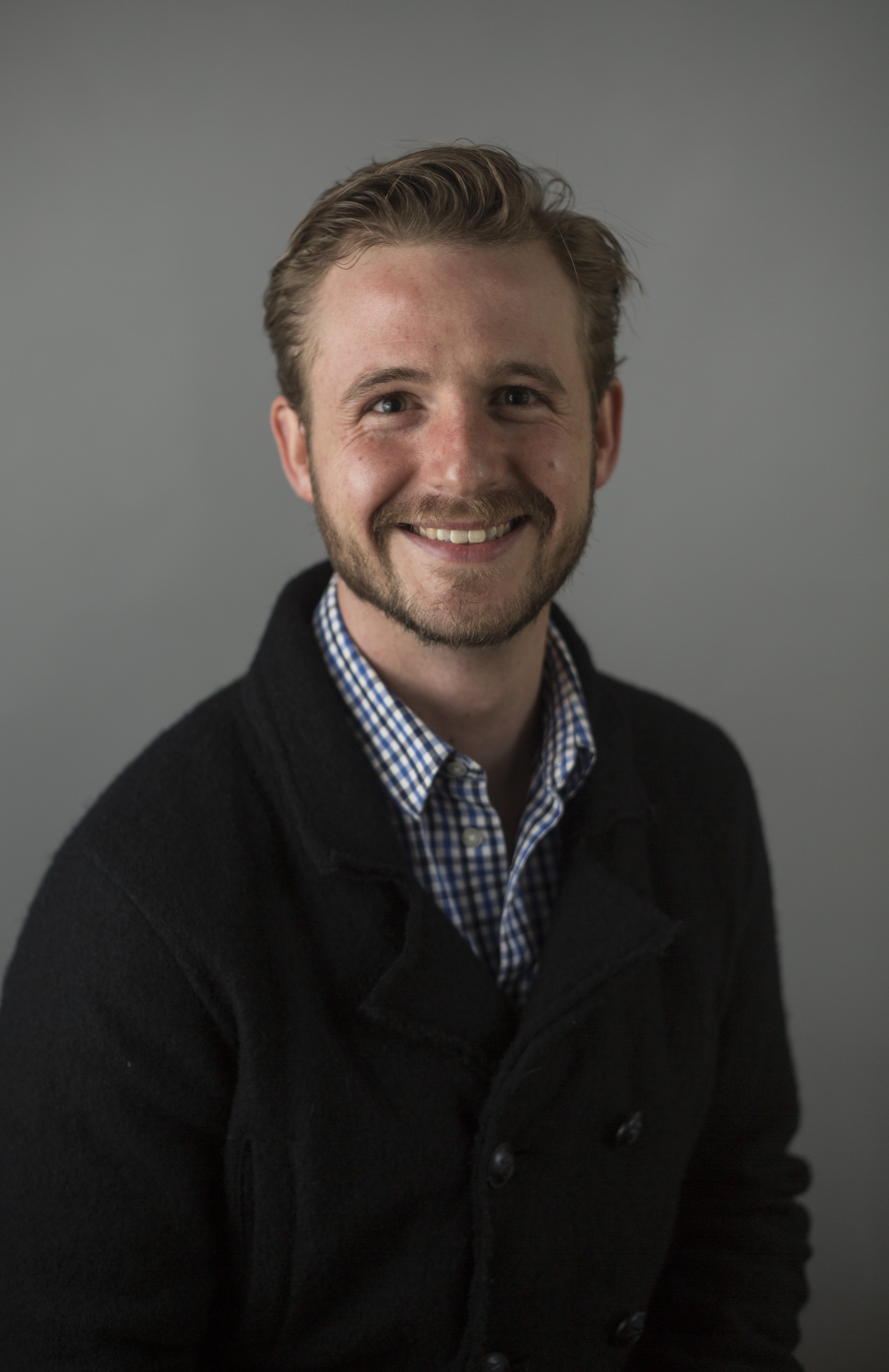
Marc Oyamburu

The business model of the company was created to help Mexican entrepreneurs find new and more modern ways to finance start-ups, as well as provide alternatives to investing abroad. The company believes that a weak peso against the dollar is good for them as it makes U.S. investments less attractive, leading investors to look for alternatives.

Its funding method is different from Kickstarter and Indiegogo, and the company claims it is the only one of its type in the world. The model is called crowd equity rather than crowdfunding. Instead of offering products or souvenirs to contributors, entrepreneurs, investors, and Play Business enter into a contract, with investors offering equity and say in the running of the start-up. This percentage is between nine and eleven percent of the total value of the company.

It is an integral model, broken down into steps. Entrepreneurs are called “makers” and investors “players.” While Play Business welcomes projects of all types, it selects only those it believes address a market need with a viable business plan and growth potential. Only about 10 percent of applicants reach the platform. Prospective makers must attend a boot camp to develop their ideas and learn about enterprise valuation, investment tools, and how to offer players a role. Makers do not receive money immediately, but rather in stages as their projects reach milestones. In this way, players can decide at any time to withdraw from the “game,” limiting their risk.

Joan Segura describes the business as a "scale up" as it emphasizes the execution of the project in stages. For example, instead of having makers write a business plan on paper, they get the new businesses out to recruit investors.

The idea is that if everyone “plays well” (jugar bien in Spanish), everyone wins. The goal of players is to increase the value of their investment, and the goal of the makers is to keep the players. If a player retires from the “game,” others can buy his/her share.

The minimum investment for players is 100 pesos per month, but they can invest up to about 500,000 pesos. If a contributor invests four percent or more of the initial investment, s/he becomes an associate of the enterprise and is able to further invest with or without Play Business. Makers report to players every month, as well as a trimester report.

Play Business charges 5% of the investment, but only if the business reaches its goal amount.

Play Business estimates that about 30% of a maker's initial investment from the platform comes from friends and family.
