= Bonaverde =

Former German coffeemaker

- Company type: Limited liability stock issuing company
- Industry: Coffeemakers
- Founded: 2013
- Founder: Hans Stier
- Headquarters: Berlin, Germany
- Key people: Michael Brehm
- Products: Bonaverde Berlin

Bonaverde was a Berlin-based company known for developing a roast-grind-brew coffeemaker. Founded by Hans Stier in 2013, the company first received widespread notice for its highly successful crowdfunding (the company is entirely crowdfunded). Despite significant controversy over its fund raising strategy and lack of communication with crowdfunding contributors, the product received recognition for its combination of coffee and Internet of Things technology, including a Dealerscope 2018 IMPACT Award.

== History ==
Hans Stier founded his first attempt at a roast-grind-brew concept, Kaffee Toro, in 2010. This version of the concept was based solely on providing consumers with green beans and a machine that could turn them into black coffee, without any connection between growers and consumers. After Kaffee Toro closed, Stier and a few members of the Kaffee Toro team refined the concept, this time opting to crowdfund the project. Stier also decided to crowd-source the initial design of the machine on Jovoto. The company's 2013 Kickstarter campaign garnered wide notice for rapidly surpassing its $135,000 goal, with over 2,200 contributing to raise more than $680,000. An Indiegogo campaign followed, with over 430 backers helping to raise close to $125,000. In August 2014, the company ran a third campaign, this time on Seedmatch, raising over €1.5mn, officially overfunding by more than 750%.

The 2013 crowdfunding campaigns projected an October 2014 delivery date. Multiple development difficulties led the company to postpone their launch for two years, debuting the finished project at the Consumer Electronics Show in January 2016. In September 2017, Bonaverde closed their fourth crowdfunding campaign, launched that summer on equity crowdfunding platform Seedrs. The campaign met its £750,000 goal within two hours of launching, and went on to raise more than £1.3 million^{[A]}. Bonaverde began its first shipments to its original crowdfunding backers during the campaign ; however, multiple funders of the original Kickstarter campaign reported receiving neither machines nor refunds as of the company's dissolution in 2019. Machines became available for general sale in late 2017.

Bonaverde AG is a limited liability stock issuing company that is not yet publicly traded. Stier remains Managing Director, while the supervisory board is run by well-known German serial entrepreneur Michael Brehm. Brehm has funded and sold companies to Google, eBay, Amazon and Facebook. Adjunct to Brehm is Dr. Jens Odewald, former CEO of the world's largest retail and electronics conglomerate METRO AG (former Kaufhaus AG) and former head of the supervisory board to Tchibo, Germany's number one coffee player and the world's sixth largest coffee house chain. Mark Hartmann, Venture Partner at Project A Ventures, oversees the board. After the Seedrs equity crowdfunding, Seedrs also became an investor as a nominee representing the individual contributors.

== Machine ==
The first version of Bonaverde's roast-grind-brew coffee machine, named Dalia, featured a crowdsourced, curved wood design and a dial with ten roasting profiles. After the crowdfunding campaign, difficulties over the course of the machine's two-year development led to a series of changes, resulting in a rectangular, white machine designed by Berlin-based designer Daniel von Waldthausen launched in January 2016. Coffee beans are placed in the top of the machine for roasting, after which they drop into a steel cone grinder and are brewed using a rainshower brewing method.

The newest version of the machine, renamed Berlin, also features Internet of Things technology connecting it to the company's cloud-based coffee marketplace. Each machine contains an RFID-reader and SIM card, enabling it to identify RFID-tagged green coffee beans, connect to the company's Coffee Cloud, and Coffee Concierge Facebook messenger app. The machine roasts green beans in 50g batches, making up to 1.2L of coffee per batch. Other features include a roaster that heats to over 600 degrees (F) and a stainless steel cone grinder.

== Coffee-Tech Interaction ==
Bonaverde is focused on employing technology to create "farmer-centric coffee." Green coffee beans sold by the company come with RFID tags programmed with a roast profile tailored for the coffee. Bonaverde users scan the RFID tags into a panel on the front of the machine to tell the machine the correct roasting parameters for a given bean. The concept aims to remove middlemen, putting the focus on the coffee farmer.

The company has also created the Bonaverde Coffee Concierge, a Facebook messenger-based digital product designed to enable deeper interaction between customers and their coffee. The Coffee Concierge's features include roast profile customization and information about the farmers who grow specific coffees, the ability to schedule a roast in advance, and other features.

Bonaverde offers a growing selection of beans for purchase in the United States and European Union. Users can also purchase green beans elsewhere and roast them using special one-size-fits-all profile tags or the Coffee Concierge.

== Recognition ==
Bonaverde's merging of tech and coffee has reached garnered wide recognition across multiple industries. In 2018, they received a Dealearscope IMPACT award for the Bonaverde Berlin. The company was also a finalist for a Product Innovation Award at the Coffee Shop Innovation Expo in 2017.^{.}The Berlin has also been highlighted by the press, who have ranked it among the 15 Best Coffeemakers on the Planet, the Top 10 Coolest Gadgets at CES 2016, and the Coolest Green Tech of 2016.

== Controversy ==
Bonaverde has received some criticism from crowdfunding backers, both due to the delayed delivery and changes in the original design. Much of the controversy stems from accusations that the company is using RFID tags to turn the machine and marketplace into a proprietary system, a criticism assuaged with the launch of the Coffee Concierge, which allows customers to roast beans from any source. Bonaverde responded to demands for refunds in 2014 by offering full refunds once the company reaches profitability.

Bonaverde has furthered the controversy by refusing refunds to many of their backers well after the request was made. Bonaverde claimed that a refund won't be made due to the use of an arbitrary date conveniently prior to the supposed request date and prior to the instructions being sent in their most recent version of 'how to request a refund'. Those backers requesting refunds are the same backers that have not received the promised machine.
