= Coolest Cooler =

Multi-function cooler funded through crowdfunding

- Developer: Ryan Grepper
- Released: 24 July 2015
- Discontinued: 06 December 2019
- Sound: Bluetooth water-resistant speaker
- Input: 2x USB charging port (5 volts, 1 amp & 2.1 amp)
- Power: 20V Rechargeable lithium ion battery
- Website: Kickstarter page

The Coolest Cooler was a multi-function cooler that was initially funded through the crowdfunding website Kickstarter. In the summer of 2014, Ryan Grepper raised over $13 million, making it the most funded Kickstarter campaign of 2014. In December 2019, the company announced that it was closing, with over 20,000 of the 62,642 original backers never receiving a cooler. The project came to be regarded as Kickstarter's largest failure.

== Crowdfunding ==
Grepper was a product developer from Portland, Oregon. He first tried to raise funding for the product in November 2013 but fell short of the $125,000 goal and failed to secure any funding. He launched a second campaign on July 8, 2014, and critics attribute the success of the second Kickstarter campaign to the timing. The Coolest received extensive press coverage when it topped the funding goals of the Pebble watch, and ended the campaign in August with $13,285,226 and 62,642 backers, making it the most-funded Kickstarter campaign of 2014.

== Background ==
Grepper designed the Coolest, initially using a weed whacker to build a portable gas-powered blender. He subsequently re-engineered a cooler with a car stereo to bring to an Independence Day beach party for friends. Grepper has said that improvements in technology and the reduced size of components made him realize that the multi-function cooler could be engineered as a consumer product, and he developed a prototype using 3D printing technology.

== Features ==
It includes an ice-crushing blender, a Bluetooth water-resistant speaker, a USB charging port, LED lamps, a bottle opener with magnetic cap catch, plates, knife, corkscrew and a removable divider that can also be used as a cutting board. The split lid design is made with steel hinges and includes cup-holders.

The cooler's hexagonal shape has a 55+ quart capacity. The cooler is powered by a rechargeable lithium-ion battery and the removable Bluetooth speaker is also rechargeable and can be paired with a second speaker up to 30 feet away.

== Development and delays ==
When Grepper launched the Kickstarter campaign for the Coolest, the company planned to deliver to backers their Coolest reward in February 2015. The success of the campaign significantly increased demand, and they were being made in China. Due to the change in quantity, complexity of shipping, logistics and certification processes, production took longer than expected. In February 2015, the company announced a postponement to July 2015. Grepper cited improvements and upgrades as partial reasons for the delay in a post on the company's blog.

The first units were shipped in July 2015 and by November 2015 tens of thousands of backers received their coolers. The company estimated it would clear the large backlog by April 2016. During a live-streamed web conference in March 2016, Grepper admitted production had stopped and he was seeking an additional $15 million, one third of which would be put toward meeting 36,000 outstanding orders from backers. In April 2016, Grepper added an option to spend $97 to get expedited shipping on the backer's delayed coolers. In May 2016, it was reported that more than 10,000 backers supported this option and production resumed in China. The company said it would fund delivery of the remaining 26,000 backer rewards from profits from retail sales.

In September 2016, after receiving 315 consumer complaints that year, the Oregon Department of Justice confirmed it was investigating Coolest Cooler for possible violations of the state's Unlawful Trade Practices Act.

As of February 2017, many backers were still waiting, but Coolest said they would use funds from sales on their website to deliver coolers to backers at the rate of 30-50 per week. In June 2017, Coolest LLC entered into an agreement with the Oregon Department of Justice that specified the plan for fulfilling the remaining Kickstarter Backer rewards.

In December 2019, Grepper and Coolest LLC, announced they were ceasing operations and would comply with the Oregon Department of Justice agreement. More than 20,000 backers who didn't receive a cooler were told they could claim $20 back, leaving them significantly out of pocket compared to the original purchase price of around $200.

== See also ==
- Ouya
- Skarp laser razor
