= Thomas Pickard =

Thomas Pickard may refer to:

- Thomas Pickard (footballer) (1911–1967), English footballer
- Thomas J. Pickard (born 1950), former FBI director
- Thomas Pickard (politician) (1819–1895), college teacher and politician in New Brunswick, Canada
- Tom Pickard (born 1946), poet and filmmaker
- K. Thomas Pickard (born 1963), American healthcare entrepreneur
