= Allbritton (surname) =

Allbritton is a surname. Notable people with the surname include:

- Chris Allbritton, American journalist
- Joe Allbritton (1924–2012), American businessman
- Louise Allbritton (1920–1979), American actress
- Nancy Allbritton, American biologist
- Robert Allbritton (born 1969), American businessman
