= Spot.us =

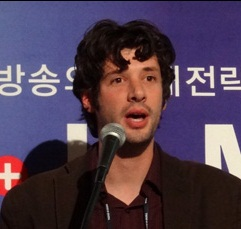
David Cohn, the founder of spot.us

Spot.Us was a non-profit organization designed to bring citizens, journalists, and news publishers together in an online marketplace based on crowdsourcing and crowdfunding methods and principles. It was founded in 2008 by David Cohn, who received a $340,000 grant from the Knight Foundation to pursue his idea. In November 2011 it was bought by American Public Media. They hosted the site for a time, but were unable to maintain it. It was retired February 2015.

While providing a new option for funding journalism, it raised questions about activism and new sorts of conflict of interest.

Spot.Us originally focused on projects in the San Francisco Bay area, where it was headquartered. It expanded to Los Angeles in 2009.

== Method of operation ==
Stories began as tips from the public giving an issue they would like to see covered, or pitches from a journalist to create a story, including the amount of money needed. Visitors to the website could then donate to fund the pitch.

Smaller stories cost a couple hundred dollars to fund, while the largest cost about one thousand dollars. Completed stories were available under a Creative Commons license. They could be viewed for free on the website and used free of charge by news organizations. News organizations that wished to gain temporary copyright of articles might do so by contributing over 50 percent of the funding.

== Conflicts of interest for journalists ==
Conflicts of interest around Spot.us arose due to the fact that readers were funding journalists' work. Because of this, journalists may have felt that they had to cater to their donors or they felt a "strong connection with the people that donated to them." This allows for an altered relationship between journalists and readers. It may also affect the way that the news is covered and compromise journalistic objectivity. Like other crowdfunding platforms, using Spot.us meant that journalists were directly involved with marketing and finances. This means that journalistic independence may also be compromised.

== See also ==
- Chris Allbritton
