= Contingency market =

Contingency markets are markets where contracts are made to exchange funds contingent upon an event or combination of events or contingencies thereof.

== Difference from prediction markets ==
Prediction markets are a subset of contingency markets and specialise in independent future events and are often exploited for the predictive side effect they produce. Complex contingencies only tend to occur in the gambling industry's implementations of prediction markets.

Unlike prediction markets, contingency markets also support dependent future events. These are a priori directly influenced or controlled by those interested in a particular outcome of an event.

== See also ==
- Insurance
- Threshold pledge
- Assurance contracts
- Betting exchange
- Preorder Economy
