= Skarp =

Skarp may refer to:

- Skarp (band), American grindcore band
- Skarp Technologies, American company developing a laser-based razor
- IF Skarp, Norwegian association football club
