= Community Funded =

Crowdfunding platform based in Fort Collins, Colorado

- Website type: Social networking service / Crowdfunding
- Available in: English
- Headquarters: Fort Collins, Colorado, {{{location_country}}}
- Owner: Community Funded Enterprises
- Creators: McCabe Calahan, Blue Hovatter, Ryan Stover
- Website: www.communityfunded.com
- Commercial: Yes
- Registration: Required to support projects or create a project
- Launched: May 2011

Community Funded is a crowdfunding platform based in Fort Collins, Colorado allowing project creators to create one or more fundraising projects on the site with the goal of helping people and organizations with projects find the ideas, funding, and resources they need to be successful.

Community Funded focuses on systemic integration of crowdfunding platforms, allowing for universities and other organizations to integrate the Community Funded crowdfunding tools into their own website. Community Funded also offers the one-off project funding concept common to many crowdfunding sites. To date many projects on the site have focused on local (Fort Collins, Colorado) social causes, but nationally focused arts and culture projects have also received funding and attention through Community Funded.

Projects can be submitted by any individual or organization. Community Funded requires all projects have a positive community impact regardless of if the project is a "Keep-it-All" or "All-or-Nothing" style project. Businesses can also support fundraising projects by providing in-kind donations of products or services in exchange for promotion on the project page.

On June 29, 2012, Community Funded co-founder McCabe Calahan presented at the Fort Collins Chamber of Commerce alongside US Senator Michael Bennet and representatives from Colorado State University and the Rocky Mountain Innovation Initiative for a roundtable discussion and seminar on the Jumpstart Our Business Startups Act.

As of March 2013, Community Funded had raised $286,000 from a total network of 2,056 individuals and 406 organizations.

By August 2013, Community Funded had raised a total of $428,610 and grown to a network of 4,391 individuals and 602 organizations across 39 states. 47 projects had been completed on the platform, only five of which received no funding whatsoever.

== Notable projects ==
- Community Funded collaborated with Colorado State University in 2013 to create the CSU Charge Crowdfunding Platform.
- The Fort Collins Bike Library raised $100,720 through Community Funded in 2012.
- Community Funded partnered with the Fort Collins Habitat For Humanity, Odell Brewing Company, New Belgium Brewing, and six other breweries on The House That Beer Built project to raise $67,613 as of August 20, 2013.
- The Pateros Creek Brewing Company raised $22,349 on Community Funded to expand and upgrade their tap room.
- SpokesBUZZ ran a successful Community Funded project in September 2012 to send six Fort Collins bands to Milwaukee, WI, Boise, ID, Portland, OR, Lafayette, LA, and Memphis, TN. The project brought partner bands back from each of the host cities to Fort Collins, CO.

== See also ==
- Causes (company)
- Threshold pledge system
- Comparison of crowd funding services
- SaaS
