= University and college crowdfunding platforms =

Garnering funds in the form of donations has always been a major focus for university leaders. These donations are usually found in the form of large annual gifts by alumni and friends of universities, along with funding from government entities for public universities. More recently, universities have been taking steps to modernize their giving structure through the use of crowdfunding. Crowdfunding is an online tool utilizing peer-to-peer relationships to help gain funds for different aspects of university culture.

== Crowdfunding ==
Crowdfunding uses the “crowd” to gain needed funding for a product or cause instead of specialized donors. Crowdfunding typically enlists the use of social media such as Facebook, Twitter, or LinkedIn increasing the virality of a project to make it more successful. In the scope of university crowdfunding, most donations go to a specific fund or cause, and because the money goes to supporting a larger nonprofit organization, many donations are tax-deductible. Because of the nature of university crowdfunding, its structure typically varies slightly from the usual crowdfunding campaign. Where a video game campaign might offer the donor early access to the game upon production, most university run projects do not have the same type of tangible product that someone is investing in that can be enjoyed. For that reason, university crowdfunding campaigns typically use giving levels or project-specific perks to incentivize their donors. Levels usually explain what the specific donation amount will do to help the project, whereas perks will offer individual recognition to the donor for their support to the cause.

== History ==
Crowdfunding first came into the university world in 2012, with the partnership of the University of Utah and the crowdfunding website RocketHub. The first set of projects launched in the partnership raised a total of $32,000 and brought in over 210 donors. Similarly in 2012, the University of Virginia launched a crowdfunding site to try to gain information about donor interests and allow donors the ability to focus of projects they are passionate about. Utilizing crowdfunding has been a way for universities to leverage the creativity and individuality of their communities as well as the accessibility of the Internet to bring in new donors. The success of a crowdfunding campaign can also typically depend on the use of social capital in the form of friends and family of the project creators. University crowdfunding websites have since moved from partnerships with existing crowdfunding websites to using crowdfunding platforms that can whitelabel their pages and provide training and support services to the university staff and student population with access to project creation.

== Main Use Cases ==
=== Unrestricted Funds ===
In many cases, universities will use crowdfunding to add to existing unrestricted funds such as scholarships, annual funds, or emergency funds. Typically these crowdfunding campaigns will use offline donations concurrently with the crowdfunding campaign in the form of gift matching, or by hosting in person fundraising events during the run of the crowdfunding campaign.

=== Participation Drives/Challenges ===
Another way the universities use crowdfunding is to increase their alumni engagement through giving to the institution. This is done through projects that place focus on participation as opposed to donation amount, measuring the success of the project by how many people gave to the cause instead of how much the total giving amount was. This type of project can also be used to generate excitement for an alumni challenge, as used by University of Texas at San Antonio in their “Alumni Challenge City Race”.

=== Research Projects ===
Universities have found that crowdfunding is great resource for large and small research projects in a few different ways. The obvious resource is the gain of funds from donors that are interested in the specific project. However, the use of crowdfunding for research projects also helps to boost the popularity and interest in a project, increasing its visibility to the global community. These types of campaigns use effective marketing and communications strategies to engage their potential donors.

=== Athletics ===
Other highly successful types of university crowdfunding campaign are athletics based campaigns. These campaigns use the pre-existing popularity of college sports to boost their fundraising capacity for different sport-related projects. One notable such project is the UCLA Spark campaign to renovate the gymnasium used by the UCLA Gymnastics team. This campaign used crowdfunding and gift-matching to raise over $150,000 for the extensive renovations. Another notable and attention-grabbing university athletic crowdfunding campaign was the “Ole Miss Football October 4, 2014 Victory Celebration”. This campaign gained media attention when it went viral and raised its total goal amount of $75,000 within three hours of going live.

=== Student Run Projects ===
University crowd funding platforms also focus on student run projects that benefit a specific student group on campus. For example, the MIT Ski Team successfully funded a "snow day fund" with the use of MIT's crowd funding platform. The project highlighted the group's needs and used appropriate perks to incentivize their potential donors. In this way, student run projects are usually very specific to the group that is creating the project and will use that specificity to garner new donorship for the university. The University of Maryland uses mostly student run projects on their crowd funding platform. One such project used the vast network of the student group by reaching out to similarly inclined student groups at other universities to raise 276% of their original goal amount.

== See also ==
- Comparison of crowd funding services
