= Copyright in Historical Perspective =

Copyright scholarship

Copyright in Historical Perspective is an influential work of copyright scholarship by Lyman Ray Patterson. The book traces the history of English copyright from the outgoing 15th century to the late 19th century.

Starting with William Caxton's introduction of the printing press to England, Patterson documents the regulation of publishing in England and the United States. He identifies censorship as a driving force in early regulation and provides a detailed account of its impact on private copyright of the publisher's guild, the Stationers' Company. He describes the system of printing patents – letters patent based on the royal prerogative that co-existed with the Stationer's copyright and remained unaffected by the Statute of Anne.

Based on Patterson's dissertation, the book was first published in 1968. As of 2010 it is still in print.

Kathy Bowrey ranks the books as one of two major contributions made by lawyers to the history of copyright:

The major contributions made by lawyers to the history of copyright date from the late 1960s when, within a year of each other, two American scholars, Benjamin Kaplan and Lyman Ray Patterson, published their works. Of these two books Patterson’s offers the most detailed account of the development of copyright.

While she further notes that later authors writing on publisher and author perspectives on copyright failed to acknowledge the contributions made by Kaplan and Patterson, the book has still been widely cited in the academic literature. Then future United States Supreme Court Justice Stephen Breyer, for instance, relied on Patterson in "The Uneasy Case for Copyright", a law review article written when Breyer was a practicing legal academic.
