= Lyman Ray Patterson =

Lyman Ray Patterson (18 February 1929 – 5 November 2003) was an American law professor and an influential copyright scholar and historian.

== Biography ==
Patterson was born in Macon, Georgia. He graduated from Mercer University, and obtained a master's degree in English from Northwestern University. After teaching English at Middle Georgia College, he joined the Army where he studied Russian at the Army Language School. During the Korean War he served as a translator of Russian radio broadcasts. Following the Army he attended law school at Mercer University. After practicing law for two years with the firm of Matthews, Maddox, Walton and Smith in Rome, Georgia he returned to the Mercer Law School to teach.

During Patterson's tenure at Mercer he attended Harvard Law School and wrote his S.J.D. dissertation on the history of copyright law, receiving his degree in 1966. The dissertation became the foundation for his book Copyright in Historical Perspective, published in 1968.

Patterson joined the faculty at Vanderbilt University Law School in 1963, and served as an assistant United States Attorney while teaching at Vanderbilt. In 1973 Patterson joined the faculty at the Emory University School of Law and was that school's Dean. In 1987, he joined the University of Georgia (UGA) School of Law faculty and remained there until his death in 2003.

The ALA L. Ray Patterson Copyright Award was established in his honor.

== Bibliography ==
- Copyright in Historical Perspective (Nashville: Vanderbilt University Press, 1968)
- The Nature of Copyright: A Law of Users' Rights (Athens: University of Georgia Press, 1991) (with Stanley W. Lindberg)
