= Assurance contract =

Form of structured finance

An assurance contract, also known as a provision point mechanism, or crowdaction, is a game-theoretic mechanism that facilitates the voluntary creation of public goods and club goods in the face of collective action problems such as the free rider problem.

The free rider problem is that there may be actions that would benefit a large group of people, but once the action is taken, there is no way to exclude those who did not pay for the action from the benefits. This leads to a game theoretic problem: all members of a group might be better off if an action were taken, and the members of the group contributed to the cost of the action, but many members of the group may make the perfectly rational decision to let others pay for it, then reap the benefits for free, possibly with the result that no action is taken. The result of this rational game play is lower utility for everyone.

== Operation ==
In a binding way, members of a group pledge to contribute to action A if a total contribution level is reached (often a monetary threshold, or a quorum of N members making the same pledge). If the threshold level is met (perhaps by a certain expiration date), the action is taken and the public good is provided; otherwise, the parties are not bound to carry through the action and any monetary contributions are refunded. The treatment of excess contributions varies: they may be lost, rebated proportionally to the contributors, or used to provide more of the public good.

The binding mechanism may be a contract enforced by a government, a contract enforced by a private organization (e.g. a mediator, a protection agency in an anarcho-capitalist society, etc.), an escrow organization (in such cases, the "binding contract" is "signed" by depositing funds in advance, which are later either disbursed according to the contract, or refunded), etc.

In the economics literature, assurance contracts were first described by Bagnoli and Lipman (1989). From 2005 to 2015, a website called pledgebank.com provided a way to do assurance contracts online with strangers using phrases like, "I will do ['some action'] but only if ['some number'] other people will do the same." In 2017, collaction.org released an English language website for assurance contracts, calling them 'crowdacting'.

== Ideological support ==
Assurance contracts are popular with libertarians and anarcho-capitalists who see it as a voluntary alternative to taxation.

Assurance contracts are also relevant to international public good provision problems, as international organisations often lack the power to draw in revenue through taxation and must instead rely upon contributions from their members.

== Dominant assurance contracts ==
Dominant assurance contracts, created by Alex Tabarrok, involve an extra component, an entrepreneur who profits when the quorum is reached and pays the signors extra if it is not. If the quorum is not formed, the signors do not pay their share and indeed actively profit from having participated since they keep the money the entrepreneur paid them. Conversely, if the quorum succeeds, the entrepreneur is compensated for taking the risk of the quorum failing. Thus, a player will benefit whether or not the quorum succeeds; if it fails the player reaps a monetary return, and if it succeeds, the player pays only a small amount more than under an assurance contract, and the public good will be provided.

Tabarrok asserts that this creates a dominant strategy of participation for all players. Because all players will calculate that it is in their best interests to participate, the contract will succeed, and the entrepreneur will be rewarded. In a meta-game, this reward is an incentive for other entrepreneurs to enter the DAC market, driving down the cost disadvantage of dominant assurance contract versus regular assurance contracts.

== See also ==
- Contingency market
- Crowd funding
- Free State Project
- Kickstarter
- Micropatronage
- Preorder economy
- Threshold pledge system
