= Experiment (website) =

Science project crowdfunding platform

- Website type: Crowdfunding
- Available in: English
- Headquarters: San Francisco, {{{location_country}}}
- Website: experiment.com
- Commercial: Yes
- Launched: 12 April 2012

Experiment, formerly called Microryza, is a US website for crowdfunding science-based research projects. Researchers can post their research projects to solicit pledges. Experiment works on the all-or-nothing funding model. The backers are only charged if the research projects reach their funding target during a set time frame. In February 2014, the site changed its name from Microryza to Experiment.com.

== History ==
It was founded in 2012 by Denny Luan and Cindy Wu, former University of Washington students. The former name Microryza is inspired by Mycorrhizae and symbiotic fungi that lives in the roots of plants.

Unlike the popular crowdfunding site Kickstarter, backers of Experiment projects do not get tangible rewards for backing. Researchers share the scientific process directly with the backers and become a part of the project. Additionally, all proposals are subject to review and approval by the site's staff, and any work involving human or animal subjects must by supported by an institutional review board.

Experiment charges 11-13% in fees (8% for platform fees and 3-5% for payment processing) only if the campaign is successful. If the campaign does not reach the funding goal, no one is charged.

As of Aug 7, 2015, more than 5,000 projects were launched and 336 of them were funded.

As of Nov 20, 2019, more than 760 project were funded, raising nearly $8 million in pledges from more than 41,000 backers.

== See also ==
- Comparison of crowd funding services
