= Skarp Technologies =

American technology company

Skarp Technologies, Inc. is a US company (registered on August 12, 2015, no. 201522510335) based in Irvine, California. Co-founded by Morgan Gustavsson and Paul Binun, the company gained public attention in October 2015 when it launched a Kickstarter crowdfunding campaign to promote the Skarp Laser Razor. It gained more than 4 million dollars' worth of pledges in less than three weeks. However, on October 12, the campaign was cancelled by Kickstarter, who alleged that Skarp acted in violation of their rules. A new Indiegogo campaign was launched within hours of the Kickstarter suspension, and it subsequently raised over $500,000 US with a claim that the device would be released to backers in March 2016. According to an update from Skarp in June 2019, the razor was still under development and had not entered production.

== Skarp Laser Razor ==
Skarp Technology claims to be currently developing the Skarp Laser Razor. The razor is claimed to be able to cut hairs by targeting the chromophores in hair by transmitting it through an optical fiber. This differs from laser hair removal treatments that target the hair follicles. According to Skarp Technologies, the razor is to be powered by a AAA battery which will last for a month, the device will be waterproof, and the size will be consistent with that of a disposable razor.

Reports have suggested that the technology may be feasible, but questions have been raised about its efficacy and ability to be made in the time that Skarp Technologies proposed.

As of December 2025, the product has still not seen any official release. The last campaign update on Indiegogo was 29 March 2022 by Morgan Gustavsson. No update has followed since. Since this time the Indiegogo page has been 'awaiting update' for a considerable time. Skarp's own email address now no longer exists and Indiegogo has failed to respond to any emails relating to Skarp.

== Crowdfunding campaigns ==
In September 2015, Skarp started a Kickstarter campaign for their product, the Skarp Laser Razor, asking for $160,000 US. The campaign rapidly passed the target amount, hitting over $700,000 in eight days, and reaching over $4,000,000. However, before the funds were due to be collected, Kickstarter cancelled the campaign, stating that Skarp were in violation of their rules for failing to provide a working prototype of their product. At the time Skarp Technologies had claimed that they had initial agreements with manufacturers in place, but while they had demonstrated part of the functionality, it was deemed to not meet Kickstarter's prototype requirements. Skarp countered by saying that they did have a working prototype, but that it had encountered performance limitations due to the very thin filament and problems with mounting it on the razor, which would be overcome once higher quality materials became available as part of the manufacturing process. CNET investigated Skarp Technologies' claims, and found that they did have a laser filament that was capable of cutting single hairs, although they noted that the filament was fragile and prone to breaking, and that it could not cut more than one hair at a time. Nevertheless, CNET also noted that the prototype did not meet the description provided in the Kickstarter campaign, as "Skarp showed off a razor that seemed to contain a laser and a battery and promised a close shave, but had only yet constructed a loose optical fiber and laser assembly that can cut one or two hairs at a time".

After being cancelled on Kickstarter, Skarp moved to Indiegogo where they launched a new campaign for their product. This was successful, and Skarp were able to raise over $500,000 using Indiegogo's "flexible funding" model, while offering the same shipping date of March 2016. Having failed to meet the release date, in July 2016 CENET reported that Skarp Technologies was running behind schedule, but had engaged Will King as chief marketing officer and adviser. At the time, the release date was put back to "at least the end of 2016". This release date was subsequently missed, and in May 2018 Skarp Technologies reported that the razor was still in development and had not yet entered production. As of June 2021 nothing has changed and multiple complaints on the Indiegogo campaign have gone unanswered. As of 12/2019 a lawsuit was opened between the partners of Skarp for a breach of contract between Morgan Gustavsson and Paul Binun and is ongoing as of 9/2021.

Last campaign update on Indiegogo was 29 March 2022 by Morgan Gustavsson, with an estimated next update Q1 2023.

On February 17, 2023, Morgan Gustavsson filed for Chapter 7 Bankruptcy.

== See also ==
- Chromophore
- Laser hair removal
- Vaporware
