= Rolling Square =

- Industry: Electronics
- Founder: Lorenzo Ferraris; Carlo Ferraris
- Headquarters: Switzerland
- Area served: Worldwide
- Products: chargers, battery banks, trackers and USB cables
- Website: rollingsquare.com

Rolling Square is a Swiss electronics brand which sells chargers, battery banks, bluetooth trackers, USB cables and other products designed for travellers.

== History ==
Rolling Square was founded by brothers Lorenzo & Carlo Ferraris in Switzerland in 2014. The company began with a campaign on the crowdfunding platform Kickstarter for a small USB cable for a keyring, which gained 30.000 backers who paid over $500,000. By 2026 the company had run ten crowdfunding campaigns with over 240.000 backers. In 2025 the company launched the Supertiny 65W Charger and later announced the Supertiny 100W, the smallest 65W and 100W GaN (Gallium Nitride), chargers in the world. In 2026 Rolling Square announced two sister brands; Await, which sells a digital camera which emulates a film camera and Natura AI which sells an AI enabled smart ring.

=== Products ===
Rolling Square produce a range of charging cables (InCharge), power banks (TAU), wireless chargers (EDGE) and wall chargers (SuperTiny), bluetooth trackers (AirCards and AirNotch Pro) and mounts for mobile phones and tablets.

== Awards ==
Rolling Square has been awarded a Red Dot Design Award, an IF Design Award, four CES Innovation Awards, and a Good Design Award by The Chicago Athenaeum: Museum of Architecture and Design and The European Centre for Architecture Art Design and Urban Studies. Rolling Square products have also featured in buying guides, including; The Guardian, Wired MacWorld, ZNet MacWorld Tom's Guide AppleInsider PackHacker What HiFi? and Cult of Mac.
