= K. Thomas Pickard =

American healthcare entrepreneur

K. Thomas "KT" Pickard
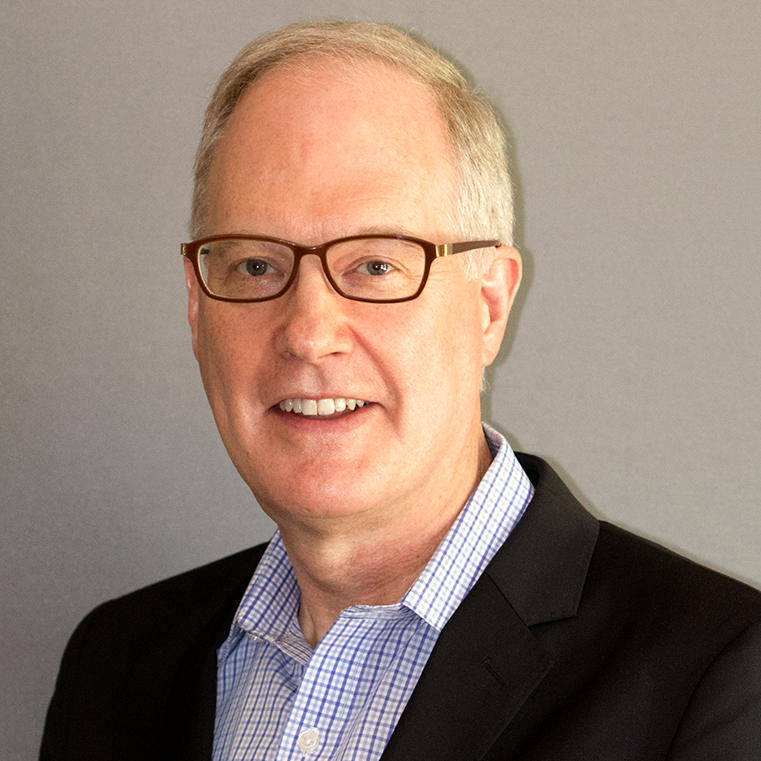
- Pickard in 2017
- Citizenship: United States
- Occupations: Medical imaging, Health IT

K. Thomas "KT" Pickard is an American executive entrepreneur working in the field of medical imaging and health IT.

Pickard worked on bioinformatics and machine learning applications at supercomputer companies Thinking Machines Corporation and MasPar prior to moving to medical imaging in 1996.

Pickard worked at UltraVisual Medical Systems in the early 2000s, and after that joined PACSGEAR, which was acquired by Lexmark in 2013.

From 2015 to 2017 he was CEO of WITS(MD) (which changed its name to ImageMoverMD shortly after he joined) and moved from San Francisco to Wisconsin. In 2018, he returned to San Francisco and joined Philips. In 2021, he joined Amazon Web Services and moved to Seattle.

He has a daughter with autism, and raised money via a crowdfunding campaign on Experiment.com to have her genome sequenced.
