= Coast Runner Industries =

American desktop CNC manufacturing company

Coast Runner Industries, Inc.
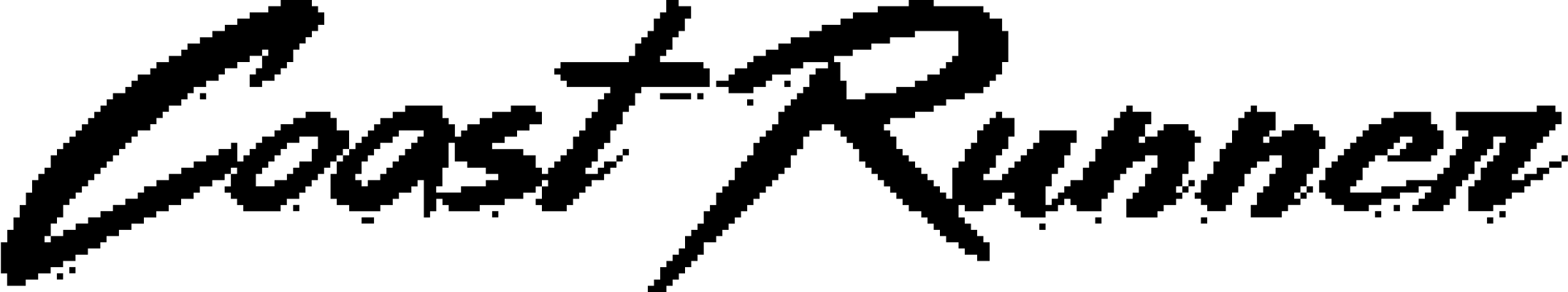
- Industry: CNC Milling
- Founded: February 2023
- Founders: Cody Wilson; Garret Walliman
- Headquarters: Austin, TX
- Key people: Cody Wilson (CEO)
- Products: Coast Runner CR-1
- Website: www.coastrunner.net

Coast Runner Industries, Inc. is an American desktop CNC milling manufacturing company headquartered in Austin, Texas. It was founded in February 2023 by Cody Wilson, Garret Walliman and others, and debuted its first product, the CR-1, on Kickstarter in February of 2024.

After Kickstarter and Indiegogo banned Coast Runner's early crowdfunding campaigns, Coast Runner sued the companies in a federal antitrust action in Texas in late 2024.

== History ==
Coast Runner previewed a prototype of its open source desktop CNC at CES in Las Vegas in 2024. Ahead of its Kickstarter launch, Coast Runner and the CR-1 were positively reviewed by MAKE magazine.

== Litigation ==
In May of 2024, San Diego County, joined by The Giffords Law Center, brought suit against Coast Runner in California state court for violating a state law "blocking gun-making milling machines."

On December 9, 2024, Coast Runner, represented by Stone Hilton, filed an antitrust action against Kickstarter, PBC, Indiegogo, Inc. and Launchboom, Inc. in a Texas federal court asking for $30M in damages.

In February 2025, a California judge rejected Coast Runner’s attempt to dismiss the state’s lawsuit under anti-SLAPP provisions, allowing the case to proceed over alleged violations of California’s gun-making-machine ban.
