= Preorder economy =

A preorder economy is a type of proposed future economy where the exact demand for goods is known ahead of time, before any material production takes place. It has been discussed within the framework of ecological economics.

== Just-in-time manufacturing ==
Creating a preorder economy has recently been proposed as an economic efficiency solution to the environmental problems facing modern society. These environmental challenges are believed to be caused in part by unsustainable levels of production, consumption and advertising related to the imperfect exchange of information in market economies. Therefore, preorder economy theory advocates using the Internet as the means to coordinate all production with existing consumer desires, so that almost nothing is made which does not have someone ready to buy it. This is the idea of just in time manufacturing taken to its logical end.

== See also ==
- Assurance contract
