= LexShares =

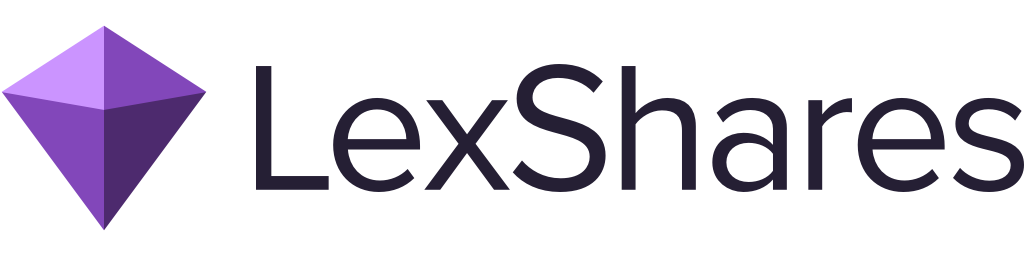
- Company type: Private company
- Industry: Legal financing
- Founded: 2014
- Founders: Jay Greenberg and Max Volsky
- Headquarters: New York, NY, United States
- Products: Litigation finance, Litigation Funding
- Services: Legal financing market place
- Website: www.lexshares.com

LexShares is an American online marketplace for investing in legal financing of litigation. It connects plaintiffs in commercial legal disputes with investors to fund their cases. Founded in 2014, LexShares is privately owned with an office presence in New York City.

The LexShares platform connects accredited investors with plaintiffs and attorneys looking for funding. Investors can buy a stake in the outcome of a lawsuit by giving plaintiffs, oftentimes business owners, the capital they need to pay legal fees or operate their business while in the midst of litigation. LexShares funds individual commercial cases. When a new case is offered, LexShares' investor network is notified and has the opportunity to invest through their online platform.

== History ==
The LexShares platform, launched by co-founders Jay Greenberg and Max Volsky in 2014, is an online marketplace for litigation funding, similar to equity crowdfunding.

In 2018, LexShares closed its debut $25 million multi-claim marketplace fund.

On 10 June 2020, LexShares confirmed the introduction of LexShares Marketplace Fund II (LMFII), a dedicated litigation finance fund with a target size of $100 million. LMFII will invest in litigation-related assets made available on the LexShares marketplace.

On 22 February 2021, LexShares announced majority investment from Brockhurst Capital Partners and that managing partner Cayse Llorens would join the firm as CEO.
