= MicroVentures =

Crowdfunding website

- Founded: 1 October 2009
- Founder: Bill Clark
- Headquarters: Austin; San Francisco
- Key people: Tyler Gray (President)
- Services: equity crowdfunding
- Website: microventures.com

MicroVentures is an equity crowdfunding website that offers investments in early stage companies. It connects accredited investors with startups, businesses and services looking to raise funds or participate in select secondary market opportunities.

MicroVentures is the only major equity crowdfunding site that is a broker-dealer registered by the Financial Industry Regulatory Authority (FINRA) and the first to take a portfolio company to a successful exit. As of October 2013, MicroVentures had raised $20 million, spread among 45 companies including Twitter, Facebook, and Yelp (before they reached the public markets).

== History ==
=== Founding ===
MicroVentures was founded by Bill Clark in Austin, Texas, in 2009. Prior to starting MicroVentures, Clark worked as a credit-risk manager with GMAC Inc., PayPal, and Dell Financial Services (DFS). Clark decided to found the company after witnessing the contraction in small-business credit opportunities following the 2008 financial crisis. MicroVentures completed FINRA's application process in 2010.

=== Growth ===
In August 2012, Tim Sullivan, then president of SharesPost, an online marketplace for trading shares of private companies, joined MicroVentures as its CEO to help scale the company. Under Sullivan, deal volume rose to over $1 million per month by January 2013, and by September 2013 MicroVentures had doubled in size and completed a successful round of fundraising on its own platform.

In March 2013, MicroVentures worked with the LAUNCH Festival to develop the first mobile crowdfunding app that would allow investors to show their interest in backing entrepreneurs at fundraising events. The company plans to eventually offer real time investing in startups through mobile.

In February 2015, MicroVentures introduced a 500 Startups Fund while announcing 25,000 global investors who have deployed over $60 million to approximately 100 companies by way of the MicroVentures platform.

In 2017, MicroVentures moved office locations to 11601 Alterra Pkwy #100, Austin, TX 78758.

== Services ==
=== Company listing & due diligence ===
MicroVentures funds startups from different industries including technology, consumer products and services, healthcare, media and entertainment, and telecommunications. MicroVentures looks at prospective early stage companies using a variety of success criteria – such as suitable risk, likelihood of profitability, and other key due diligence factors. MicroVentures accepts less than 0.5% of companies who apply for listing on the platform. If a company is selected for listing, MicroVentures then posts the results of their due diligence for investors to review. The average company listed on MicroVentures raises $250,000; outliers have raised over $1 million. Microventures takes a 10% fee (5% from the issuer and 5% from investors) from each successful raise plus 10% carry. If the full amount of an offering is not raised, then all investor money is returned.

=== Investors ===
MicroVentures accepts both accredited investors and sophisticated non-accredited investors on its platform. MicroVentures speaks to every investor who signs up by phone to determine that they are accredited investors or meet suitability requirements. MicroVentures counts more than 60,000 accredited investors on the platform, including a "meaningful number" of international investors. The typical minimum investment is $5,000.

=== Broker-dealer services ===
As a FINRA registered broker-dealer, MicroVentures may legally sell shares of companies on their own. Competing platforms require a third-party middleman to sell shares.

== Notable offerings ==
=== Primary offerings ===
MicroVentures completed funding of its first three companies in April 2011, raising a total of $150,000. The first project was Republic Project, a cloud based platform to help advertisers manage digital-media campaigns. In October 2013, Republic Project sold to Digital Generation for a total of $14.5 million. The sale represented the first liquidity event, or "exit," for investors in an equity crowdfunded company.

In April 2013, Graphicly raised $300,000 on MicroVentures. Overall, Graphicly has raised $1 million over two separate rounds on MicroVentures.

=== Secondary offerings ===
In July 2011, MicroVentures raised a $500,000 fund to invest in Facebook through the purchase of private company shares on secondary markets.

In November 2011, MicroVentures raised $100,000 for private shares of Yelp at a price of $6 to $7 a share.

Beginning in February 2012 and continuing through shortly before the company's IPO, MicroVentures offered shares of Twitter on its platform. The company saw demand in excess of 300 times the number of shares available.

== See also ==
- JOBS Act
