= RocketHub =

Defunct online crowdfunding platform

- Website type: Crowdfunding
- Website: rockethub.com

RocketHub was an online crowdfunding platform launched in 2010, its first use was September 1, 2009. Based in New York City, its users included musicians, entrepreneurs, scientists, game developers, philanthropists, filmmakers, photographers, theatre producers/directors, writers, and fashion designers. Users posted fundraising campaigns to it to raise funds and awareness for projects and endeavors. Operating in over 190 countries, RocketHub was once considered one of America's largest crowdfunding platforms.

== History ==
Incorporated in 2009, the platform launched by January 2012. The original founders of RocketHub were Brian Meece, Jed Cohen, Alon Hillel-Tuch, and Vladimir Vukicevic. Bill Clinton and Bill Gates selected it as part of their guest-edited Ways to Change the World edition of Wired Magazine.

RocketHub was the first crowdfunding platform to partner with network television, “We believe we’re the first broadcast network to start an initiative using crowdfunding to help people grow their business ideas,” said Dr. Libby H. O’Connell, Senior Vice President of Corporate Outreach for A&E Networks.

RocketHub engaged in a partnership with marketing agency Wieden & Kennedy and Chrysler's Dodge Dart in 2013 allowing users to crowdfund the purchase of a car. It was featured at the 2013 Cannes Film Festival, the campaign video became a Cannes Bronze Film Lion winner.

On April 15, 2015, RocketHub was acquired by EFactor Group, an online resource center for entrepreneurs. The acquisition deal was valued at US$15M.

In 2018, eFactor Group shut down the RocketHub brand.

In 2022, RocketHub.com domain was acquired by Charlie Patel, CEO of the newly formed RocketHub LLC. It launched as a platform for SaaS (software-as-a-service) products, WordPress plugins, and informational products. The new RocketHub entity and brand is not associated with any of the prior entities or individuals.

== Crowdfunding ==
RocketHub enabled direct-to-fan social media-based outreach and fundraising. Project leaders, i.e., fundraisers, publicize campaigns themselves through Facebook, Twitter and similar platforms. When posting a campaign, users chose a campaign deadline, target funding-goal, and offered “perks” in exchange for contributions. Broadly, RocketHub shared similarities with platforms such as Kickstarter, Sellaband, and Pledgemusic, however if the selected funding target is not reached by the deadline, the project leader was still able to keep the collected funds. RocketHub charged 4% of funds collected, plus 4% payment processing fees, if the project is fully funded, and 8% plus 4% payment processing fees if the project does not reach its goal.

== JOBS Act ==
On April 5, 2012, President Obama signed the Jumpstart Our Business Startups Act (JOBS Act) into law. Among other things, the act legalizes investment in closely held corporations in exchange for funds from non-accredited investors. In response, RocketHub published a whitepaper entitled “Regulation Of Crowdfunding” offering its perspective on how the U.S. Securities and Exchange Commission should regulate the industry.

On June 26, 2012, Rockethub testified before Congress regarding the JOBS Act, presenting three points. They included how crowdfunding democratizes fundraising; how it will lead to job growth; and how it empowers investors.

== Partnerships ==
RocketHub had partnered with organizations in order to educate the public about the emerging field of crowdfunding:

- The Recording Academy and The Grammy Awards - November 4, 2010 - Music Box Panel: A Professional Development Event Crowd Funding
- New York City Department of Consumer Affairs and New York City Department of Cultural Affairs - October 23, 2010 - The Art of the Deal
- CMJ Music Marathon, Music Dish, and Women in Music - October 20, 2010 - The "Musicians As Entrepreneurs" Official CMJ Music Marathon Networking & Showcase Event
- New Music Seminar - July 19, 2010 - NMS New York 2010
- Fractured Atlas
- The Orchard (company)

== See also ==
- Comparison of crowdfunding services
