= Chris Allbritton =

Web blogger and journalist

Christopher Allbritton is a web blogger and journalist, best known for starting the Web log Back to Iraq during the 2003 Iraq War. After he raised $15,000 from his readers, he became the Web's "first fully reader-funded journalist-blogger."

He taught a blogging class at New York University until, after a second round of fundraising, he returned to Baghdad in May 2004 and contracted with Time magazine as a correspondent for Iraq until March 2006.

He previously worked for the Associated Press and the New York Daily News covering the Internet, technology and business. He holds a Bachelor of Arts in journalism from the University of Arkansas at Little Rock and a Masters in Science in Journalism from Columbia University Graduate School of Journalism in New York City. He then was based in Beirut, Lebanon, where he reported on the 2006 Israel-Lebanon conflict as well as a range of regional issues.

He was selected as a Knight Fellow at Stanford University, where he spent a year before moving to Pakistan and has been appointed as the Pakistan Bureau Chief for Thomson Reuters.
