= The Uneasy Case for Copyright =

1970 law review article by Stephen Breyer

"The Uneasy Case for Copyright: A Study of Copyright in Books, Photocopies, and Computer Programs" was an article in the Harvard Law Review by future United States Supreme Court Justice Stephen Breyer in 1970, while he was still a legal academic. The article was a challenge to copyright expansionism, which was just entering its modern phase, and was still largely unquestioned in the United States. It became one of the most widely cited skeptical examinations of copyright.

In this piece, Breyer made several points:

- That the only defensible justification of copyright is a consequentialist economic balance between maximizing the distribution of works and encouraging their production.
- That there is significant historical, logical, and anecdotal evidence which shows that exclusive rights will provide only limited increases in the volume of literary production, particularly within certain sections of the book market.
- That there was limited justification for contemporary expansions in the scope and duration of copyright.

There was a formal reply by law student Barry W. Tyerman in the UCLA Law Review, and a rejoinder by Breyer, but the article appears to have had little impact on copyright policy in the lead up to the Copyright Act of 1976.

Seventeen years later, in their mathematical law and economics article "An Economic Analysis of Copyright Law" (1989), William Landes and Richard Posner systematically analyzed each of Breyer's arguments and concluded that "they do not make a persuasive case for eliminating copyright protection." In particular they noted that many of his arguments rested on imperfect copying technology, an argument which weakens with technological innovation.
