= Crowdfunding =

Collection of finance from backers to fund an initiative

Crowdfunding is the practice of funding a project or venture by raising money from a large number of people, typically via the internet. Crowdfunding is a form of crowdsourcing and alternative finance, to fund projects "without standard financial intermediaries". In 2015, over US$34 billion was raised worldwide by crowdfunding. One of the companies that obtained money through crowdfunding is Bonaverde in Berlin.

Although similar concepts can also be executed through mail-order subscriptions, benefit events, and other methods, the term crowdfunding refers to internet-mediated registries. This modern crowdfunding model is generally based on three types of actors – the project initiator who proposes the idea or project to be funded, individuals or groups who support the idea, and a moderating organization (the "platform") that brings the parties together to launch the idea.

The term crowdfunding was coined in 2006 by entrepreneur and technologist, Michael Sullivan, to differentiate traditional fundraising from the trends of native Internet projects, companies and community efforts to support various kinds of creators. Crowdfunding has been used to fund a wide range of for-profit entrepreneurial ventures such as artistic and creative projects, medical expenses, travel, and community-oriented social entrepreneurship projects. Although crowdfunding has been suggested to be highly linked to sustainability, empirical validation has shown that sustainability plays only a fractional role in crowdfunding. Its use has also been criticized for funding quackery, especially costly and fraudulent cancer treatments.

== History ==
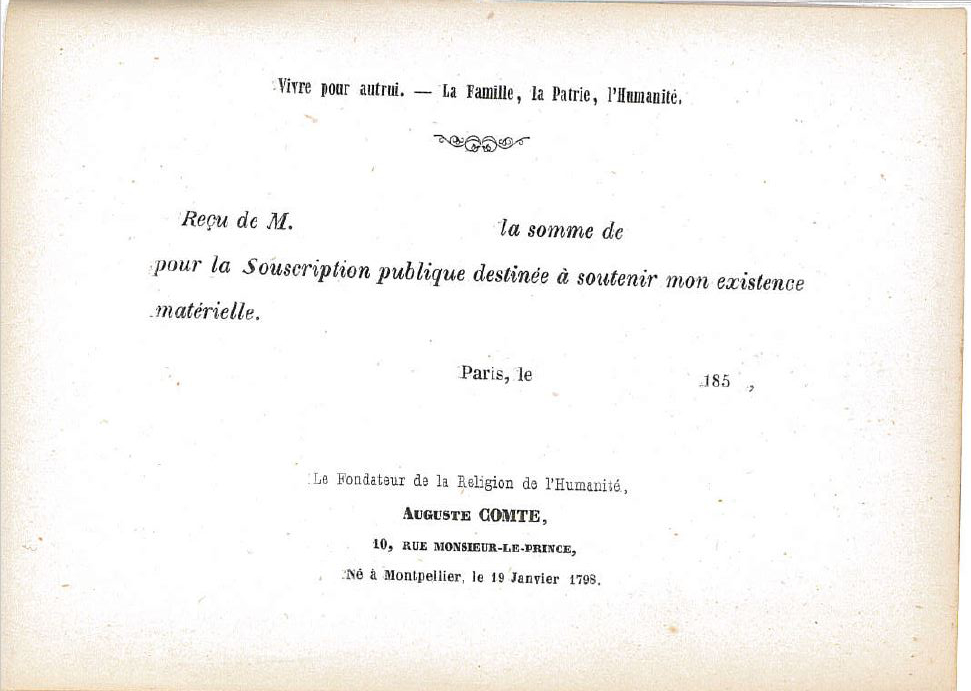
A printed receipt 135 × 97 mm issued between 1850 and 1857 to support French philosopher Auguste Comte

Funding by collecting small donations from many people has a long history with many roots. Books have been funded in this way in the past; authors and publishers would advertise book projects in praenumeration or subscription schemes. The book would be written and published if enough subscribers signaled their readiness to buy the book once it was out. The subscription business model is not exactly crowdfunding, since the actual flow of money only begins with the arrival of the product. However, the list of subscribers has the power to create the necessary confidence among investors that is needed to risk the publication.

War bonds are theoretically a form of crowdfunding for military conflicts. London's mercantile community saved the Bank of England in the 1730s when customers demanded their pounds to be converted into gold – they supported the currency until confidence in the pound was restored, thus crowdfunding their own money. A clearer case of modern crowdfunding is Auguste Comte's scheme to issue notes for the public support of his further work as a philosopher. The "Première Circulaire Annuelle adressée par l'auteur du Système de Philosophie Positive" was published on March 14, 1850, and several of these notes, blank and with sums, have survived. The cooperative movement of the 19th and 20th centuries is a broader precursor. It generated collective groups, such as community or interest-based groups, pooling subscribed funds to develop new concepts, products, and means of distribution and production, particularly in rural areas of Western Europe and North America. In 1885, when government sources failed to provide funding to build a monumental base for the Statue of Liberty, a newspaper-led campaign attracted small donations from 160,000 donors.

Crowdfunding on the internet first gained popularity and mainstream use in the arts and music communities. One of the earlier instances of online crowdfunding in the music industry was in 1997, when fans of the British rock band Marillion raised US$60,000 in donations through an Internet campaign to underwrite an entire U.S. tour however this was not crowdfunding in its true sense as it wasn't asked for by the band and only reluctantly taken. The band subsequently used this method to fund their studio albums. This built on the success of crowdfunding via magazines, such as the 1992 campaign by the Vegan Society that crowdfunded the production of the Truth or Dairy video documentary. In the film industry, writer/director Mark Tapio Kines designed a website in 1997 for his then-unfinished first feature film, the independent drama Foreign Correspondents. By early 1999, he had raised more than US$125,000 through the site from various fans and investors, providing him with the funds to complete his film. In 2002, the "Free Blender" campaign was an early software crowdfunding precursor. The campaign aimed for open-sourcing the Blender 3D computer graphics software by collecting €100,000 from the community, while offering additional benefits for donating members.

The first online crowdfunding platform, ArtistShare launched in 2001, was innovative in providing an opportunity to mix various rewards. As the model matured, more crowdfunding sites started to appear on the web such as Kiva (2005), The Point (2008, precursor to Groupon), Indiegogo (2008), Kickstarter (2009), GoFundMe (2010), Microventures (2010), YouCaring (2011), Crowdfunder (2012), and Redshine Publication (2012) for book publication.

The phenomenon of crowdfunding is older than the term "crowdfunding". The earliest recorded use of the word was in August 2006. Crowdfunding is a part of crowdsourcing, which is a much wider phenomenon itself.

The use of crowdfunding in the US has gained an increased presence since the JOBS Act and has a significant social media presence. "Approximately 25 percent of real-world relationships start online, with people of all ages migrating online to find a partner. Crowdfunding is doing for small businesses and entrepreneurs what dating sites have done for singles." Those unable to procure funding from traditional methods may be interested in pursuing crowdfunding as an option; however, the success rate may be a deterrent. E. Mollick examined Kickstarter projects from 2009 through 2012 and found that many projects were not successful as only "3% raise 50% of their goal," and he stated that successful projects succeed "by relatively small margins."

== Types ==
The Crowdfunding Centre's May 2014 report identified two primary types of crowdfunding:

1. Rewards crowdfunding, in which entrepreneurs pre-sell a product or service to launch a business concept without incurring debt or sacrificing equity/shares.
2. Equity crowdfunding, in which the backer receives shares of a company, usually in its early stages, in exchange for the money pledged.

=== Reward-based ===
Reward-based crowdfunding has been used for a wide range of purposes, including album recording and motion-picture promotion, free software development, inventions development, scientific research, and civic projects.

Many characteristics of rewards-based crowdfunding, also called non-equity crowdfunding, have been identified by research studies. In rewards-based crowdfunding, funding does not rely on location. The distance between creators and investors on Sellaband was about 3,000 miles when the platform introduced royalty sharing. The funding for these projects is distributed unevenly, with a few projects accounting for the majority of overall funding. Additionally, funding increases as a project nears its goal, encouraging what is called "herding behavior". Research also shows that friends and family account for a large or even majority portion of early fundraising. This capital may encourage subsequent funders to invest in the project. While funding does not depend on location, observation shows that funding is largely tied to the locations of traditional financing options. In reward-based crowdfunding, funders are often too hopeful about project returns and must revise expectations when returns are not met.

In the United Kingdom, rewards-based crowdfunding has been adopted by public institutions as a mechanism for distributing grant funding. Crowdfunder, a British platform founded in 2011, pioneered a "matched crowdfunding" model in which public bodies pledge additional funds to projects that successfully raise a threshold amount from the public. A pilot delivered in partnership with Nesta, Arts Council England, and the Heritage Lottery Fund between 2016 and 2017 demonstrated that match funding could leverage significantly greater public contributions: £251,500 in institutional funding supported 59 arts and heritage projects, which collectively raised an additional £405,941 from 4,970 individual backers. The findings were published as Matching the Crowd, a research report produced jointly by Nesta and the Department for Digital, Culture, Media and Sport.

=== Prize draw crowdfunding ===
A variant of rewards-based crowdfunding involves prize draws, in which participants donate to a campaign in exchange for entries into a draw for a prize, rather than a guaranteed reward. This model has been used primarily for charitable fundraising, combining the incentive of a high-value prize with the goal of raising funds for a cause.

In the United Kingdom, Crowdfunder has hosted several significant prize draw campaigns. Glastonbury Festival ran prize draws on the platform in 2024 and 2025, offering tickets to the sold-out festival in exchange for £10.

=== Equity ===
Equity crowdfunding is the collective effort of individuals to support efforts initiated by other people or organizations through the provision of finance in the form of equity. In the United States, legislation that is mentioned in the 2012 JOBS Act will allow for a wider pool of small investors with fewer restrictions following the implementation of the act. Unlike non-equity crowdfunding, equity crowdfunding contains heightened "information asymmetries." The creator must not only produce the product for which they are raising capital, but also create equity through the construction of a company. Equity crowdfunding, unlike donation and rewards-based crowdfunding, involves the offer of securities which include the potential for a return on investment. Syndicates, which involve many investors following the strategy of a single lead investor, can be effective in reducing information asymmetry and in avoiding the outcome of market failure associated with equity crowdfunding.

Contributors may act as investors and receive shares directly, or the crowdfunding service may act as a nominated agent. Equity crowdfunding helps "the 90 percent of businesses that were left out in the cold" by traditional funding methods, which is why it has become such a viable option for business startups.

Equity-based funding is illegal in many countries, such as India. In the United States the JOBS Act of 2012 regulated the trend. This "legislation was intended to increase access to capital for the innovative companies" in need of investment capital and allows a pool of small investors to come together. The Regulation was updated in 2021 by the SEC allowing companies to raise to $5 million per year from unaccredited investors and allowing investors to invest more.

=== Digital security ===
Another kind of crowdfunding is to raise funds for a project where a digital security is offered as a reward to funders which is known as Initial coin offering (abbreviated to ICO). Some value tokens are endogenously created by particular open decentralized networks that are used to incentivize client computers of the network to expend scarce computer resources on maintaining the protocol network. These value tokens may or may not exist at the time of the crowdsale, and may require substantial development effort and eventual software release before the token is live and establishes a market value. Although funds may be raised simply for the value token itself, funds raised on blockchain-based crowdfunding can also represent equity, bonds, or even "market-maker seats of governance" for the entity being funded. Examples of such crowd sales are Augur decentralized, distributed prediction market software which raised US$4 million from more than 3500 participants; Ethereum blockchain; and "the Decentralized Autonomous Organization".

=== Debt-based ===
Debt-based crowdfunding (also known as "peer-to-peer", "P2P", "marketplace lending", or "crowdlending") arose with the founding of Zopa in the UK in 2005 and in the US in 2006, with the launches of Lending Club and Prosper.com. Borrowers apply online, generally for free, and their application is reviewed and verified by an automated system, which also determines the borrower's credit risk and interest rate. Investors buy securities in a fund that makes loans to individual borrowers or bundles of borrowers. Investors make money from interest on the unsecured loans; the system operators make money by taking a percentage of the loan and a loan servicing fee. In 2009, institutional investors entered the P2P lending arena; for example in 2013, Google invested $125 million in Lending Club. In 2014, in the US, P2P lending totaled about $5 billion. In 2014, in the UK, P2P platforms lent businesses £749 million, a growth of 250% from 2012 to 2014, and lent retail customers £547 million, a growth of 108% from 2012 to 2014. In both countries in 2014, about 75% of all the money transferred through crowdfunding went through P2P platforms. Lending Club went public in December 2014 at a valuation around $9 billion.

=== Litigation ===
Litigation crowdfunding allows plaintiffs or defendants to reach out to hundreds of their peers simultaneously in a semi-private and confidential manner to obtain funding, either seeking donations or providing a reward in return for funding. It also allows investors to purchase a stake in a claim they have funded, which may allow them to get back more than their investment if the case succeeds (the reward is based on the compensation received by the litigant at the end of his or her case, known as a contingent fee in the United States, a success fee in the United Kingdom, or a pactum de quota litis in many civil law systems). LexShares is a platform that allows accredited investors to invest in lawsuits. If the claimant wins, investors may get more than their initial investment.

=== Donation-based ===
Donation-based crowdfunding is the collective effort of individuals to help charitable causes. In donation-based crowdfunding, funds are raised for religious, social environmental, or other purposes. Donors come together to create an online community around a common cause to help fund services and programs to combat a variety of issues including healthcare and community development. The major aspect of donor-based crowdfunding is that there is no reward for donating; rather, it is based on the donor's altruistic reasoning. Ethical concerns have been raised about the increasing popularity of donation-based crowdfunding, which can be affected by fraudulent campaigns and privacy issues.

== Role ==
The inputs of the individuals in the crowd trigger the crowdfunding process and influence the ultimate value of the offerings or outcomes of the process. Individuals act as agents of the offering, selecting, and promoting the projects in which they believe. They sometimes play a donor role oriented towards providing help on social projects. In some cases, they become shareholders and contribute to the development and growth of the offering. Individuals disseminate information about projects they support in their online communities, generating further support (promoters).

The motivation for consumer participation stems from the feeling of being at least partly responsible for the success of other people's initiatives (desire for patronage), striving to be a part of a communal social initiative (desire for social participation), and seeking a payoff from monetary contributions (desire for investment). Additionally, individuals participate in crowdfunding to see new products before the public. Early access often allows funders to participate more directly in the development of the product. Crowdfunding is also particularly attractive to funders who are family and friends of a creator. It helps to mediate the terms of their financial agreement and manage each group's expectations for the project.

An individual who takes part in crowdfunding initiatives tends to have several distinct traits – innovative orientation, which stimulates the desire to try new modes of interacting with firms and other consumers; social identification with the content, cause, or project selected for funding, which sparks the desire to be a part of the initiative; and (monetary) exploitation, which motivates the individual to participate by expecting a payoff. Crowdfunding platforms are motivated to generate income by drawing worthwhile projects and generous funders. These sites also seek widespread public attention for their projects and platforms.

Crowdfunding websites helped companies and individuals worldwide raise US$89 million from members of the public in 2010, $1.47 billion in 2011, and $2.66 billion in 2012 — $1.6 billion of the 2012 amount was raised in North America.

Crowdfunding is expected to reach US$1 trillion in 2025. A May 2014 report, released by the United Kingdom-based The Crowdfunding Centre and titled "The State of the Crowdfunding Nation", presented data showing that during March 2014, more than US$60,000 were raised on an hourly basis via global crowdfunding initiatives. Also during this period, 442 crowdfunding campaigns were launched globally on a daily basis.

The future growth potential of crowdfunding platforms also depends on their financing volume with venture capital. Between January 2017 and April 2020 globally 99 venture capital financing rounds for crowdfunding platforms took place with more than half a billion USD of total money raised. The median amount per venture capital financing rounds for crowdfunding was $5 million in the U.S. and $1.5 million in Europe between January 2017 and April 2020.

== Platforms ==
In 2015, it was predicted that over 2,000 crowdfunding sites would be available to choose from in 2016. As of 2021, there are 1,478 crowdfunding organizations in the US (Crunchbase, 2021). As of January 2021, Kickstarter has raised more than $5.6 billion spread over 197,425 projects.

Crowdfunding platforms have differences in the services they provide and the type of projects they support.

Curated crowdfunding platforms serve as "network orchestrators" by curating the offerings that are allowed on the platform. They create the necessary organizational systems and conditions for resource integration among other players to take place. Relational mediators act as an intermediary between supply and demand. They replace traditional intermediaries (such as traditional record companies and venture capitalists). These platforms link new artists, designers, and project initiators with committed supporters who believe in the people behind the projects strongly enough to provide monetary support.

In response to arbitrary crowdfunding curation on existing platforms, an open source alternative called Selfstarter emerged in late 2012 from the project Lockitron after it was rejected from Kickstarter. While Selfstarter required the creators of the project to set up hosting and payment processing, it proved that projects could successfully crowdfund without middlemen taking a significant percentage of the money raised.

Online crowdfunding donors differ from traditional fundraising donors in that donors give anonymously, do not have a connection to the recipient, and may seek out a cause or recipient to give to. Another important factor is that online donors are not limited by their geographic location and can give to individuals or organizations anywhere in the world. Once a fundraiser is created, individuals can share the details anywhere to attract donors and gather funds for their cause. When it comes to motives, donations are made to individuals to help them reach a goal and typically drop off once that is met; however, donations to organizations are made for a greater societal good. The demographics of online donors vary from traditional donors as "online donors tend to be younger and give larger gifts than traditional donors." This is important for online campaign organizers to note as they determine their target audience; however, those over 50 have increased their social media usage and have a presence on Facebook.

More research is needed in regard to the topic of crowdfunding in general. There are benefits to online crowdfunding as it has the ability to tap into audiences that are not close in geographic proximity to an individual or organization and to increase awareness about a campaign. However, with relatively low funding success rates reported, "social networking and traditional approaches to fundraising may be complements" to help individuals and organizations raise funds but not a replacement."

== Significant campaigns ==
=== Crowdfunder UK prize draws to win tickets to Glastonbury Festival ===
Since 2024, Glastonbury Festival has run annual prize draws on the Crowdfunder platform, offering tickets to raise funds for humanitarian causes. In March 2024, a draw offering 20 pairs of tickets to the sold-out 2024 festival raised £639,720 from public entries; Glastonbury Festival matched the total, bringing the combined sum to £1,279,440 for the British Red Cross, Oxfam, and War Child. In 2025, a second draw offering 25 pairs of tickets raised a further £929,480 for Médecins Sans Frontières, again with Glastonbury matching the total raised.

=== Crowdfunding for Statue of Liberty ===
In the summer of 1885, crowdfunding averted a crisis that threatened the completion of the Statue of Liberty. Construction of the statue's pedestal stalled due to a lack of financing. Fundraising efforts for the project fell short of the necessary amount by more than a third. New York Governor Grover Cleveland refused to appropriate city funds for the project, and Congress could not agree on a funding package.

Recognizing the social and symbolic significance of the statue, publisher Joseph Pulitzer launched a five-month fundraising campaign in his newspaper The World. The paper solicited contributions by publishing articles that appealed to the emotions of New Yorkers. Donations of all sizes poured in, ranging from $0.15 to $250. More than 160,000 people across America gave, including businessmen, waiters, children, and politicians. The paper chronicled each donation, published letters from contributors on the front page, and kept a running tally of funds raised.

The campaign raised over $100,000 (roughly $2 million today) allowing the city to complete construction of the pedestal. Pulitzer and The World simultaneously saved the Statue of Liberty and gave birth to crowdfunding in American politics.

=== Early campaigns ===
Marillion started crowdfunding in 1997. Fans of the British rock band raised $60,000 (£39,000) via the internet to help finance a North American tour. The Professional Contractors Group, a trade body representing freelancers in the UK, raised £100,000 over two weeks in 1999 from some 2,000 freelancers threatened by a government measure known as IR35. In 2003, jazz composer Maria Schneider (musician) launched the first crowdfunding campaign on ArtistShare for a new recording. The recording was funded by her fans and became the first recording in history to win a Grammy Award without being available in retail stores.

Oliver Twisted (Erik Estrada, Karen Black) was an early crowdfunded film. Subscribers of The Blue Sheet formed The Florida Film Investment Co (FFI) in January 1995, and started selling shares of stock at $10 a share to fund the $80,000 – $100,000 film. The Movie was filmed in Oct 1996. The film was distributed by RGH/Lion's Shares Pictures.

In 2004, Electric Eel Shock, a Japanese rock band, raised £10,000 from 100 fans (the Samurai 100) by offering them a lifetime membership on the band's guestlist. Two years later, they became the fastest band to raise a US$50,000 budget on SellaBand. Franny Armstrong later created a donation system for her feature film The Age of Stupid. Over five years, from June 2004 to June 2009 (release date), she raised £1,500,000.

=== Highest-grossing campaigns ===
As of the beginning of 2025, the highest reported funding by a crowdfunded project to date is Star Citizen, an online space trading and combat video game being developed by Chris Roberts and Cloud Imperium Games; it has raised over $800M to date, and while it has a devoted fan base, criticism has arisen for being a potential scam.

=== Crowdfunder campaigns ===
Crowdfunder is a British rewards-based and donation crowdfunding platform founded in 2011, and one of the few major crowdfunding platforms headquartered in the United Kingdom. Unlike predominantly US-based platforms, Crowdfunder operates in partnership with UK public bodies including Sport England, Arts Council England, and numerous local authorities, which use the platform to distribute grant and match funding to community projects. Notable campaigns hosted on the platform include:

- In March 2024, Glastonbury Festival ran a prize draw on the platform offering 20 pairs of tickets to the sold-out festival to raise emergency funds for people affected by conflict. The draw raised £639,720 from public entries, which Glastonbury matched in full, bringing the total to £1,279,440 for the British Red Cross, Oxfam, and War Child. In 2025, a second draw offering 25 pairs of tickets raised a further £929,480 for Médecins Sans Frontières.
- In June 2026, the Prince of Wales donated £1,000 under the name "William Wales" to a Crowdfunder campaign by the Semington Community Benefit Society to reopen the Somerset Arms, a village pub in Wiltshire.
- In June 2026, Academy Award-winning actress Olivia Colman backed a Crowdfunder campaign to save the Lyric Theatre in Bridport, Dorset, a Grade II listed building dating to 1746, describing it as "a truly special place at the heart of Bridport's creative community".

=== Kickstarter campaigns ===
On April 17, 2014, The Guardian media outlet published a list of "20 of the most significant projects" launched on the Kickstarter platform before the date of publication, including: Musician Amanda Palmer raised US$1.2 million from 24,883 backers in June 2012 to make a new album and art book.

Other campaigns include:

- The "Coolest Cooler" raised a total of $13,285,226 from 62,642 backers in July 2014 in a campaign run by Funded Today. The cooler features a blender, waterproof Bluetooth speakers and an LED light.
- Zack Brown raised $55,000 from over 6,900 backers in September 2014 to make a bowl of potato salad. Noteworthy is that his initial goal was only $10, but his campaign went viral and got a lot of attention. Brown ended up throwing a potato salad party with over 3,000 pounds of potatoes.
- Actor and director Zach Braff raised more than $3 million via a Kickstarter campaign to fund his 2014 movie Wish I Was Here

Kickstarter has been used to successfully revive or launch television and film projects that could not get funding elsewhere. These are the current record holders for projects in the "film" category:

1. Critical Role raised a total of $11,385,449 with 88,887 backers in April 2019 to make an animated TV show based on their Twitch live-streamed Dungeons & Dragons game. Not only did the campaign exceed the $750,000 goal, but the campaign also broke the Kickstarter record for most money raised for projects in the "film" category.
2. Mystery Science Theater 3000 raised a total of $5,764,229 with 48,270 backers in December 2015 to create 14 episodes of the new series, including a holiday special.
3. Veronica Mars raised a total of $5,702,153 with 91,585 backers in March 2013 to create a film set 9 years after the end of the TV show. In the campaign's first 12 hours of existence, it became the fastest Kickstarter campaign to reach both $1 million and $2 million and it held onto the record of highest in the "film" category until Mystery Science Theater 3000 beat it in 2015.

=== Third parties ===
A number of private companies thrive on crowdfunding and offer services related to a number of platforms. Examples include large companies like BackerKit that principally offer data analysis of campaigns, or Y Combinator, which acts as a startup accelerator and receives a significant number of its applicants from platforms such as Kickstarter and Indiegogo. The Italian-American company Atellani USA was originally founded with the intent to market, accelerate, and invest in startups wanting to publicize their ideas via crowdfunding platforms like Kickstarter, often designing the startup's campaign and online material.

== Applications ==
Crowdfunding is being explored as a potential funding mechanism for creative work such as blogging and journalism, music, independent film (see crowdfunded film), and for funding startup companies.

=== Creative work ===
In music, crowdfunding can provide a way for artists to directly connect with and cultivate a fanbase, inviting supporters to participate actively in their careers. Crowdfunding has also been used to fund community music labels, where "fans assume the traditional financier role of a record label for artists they believe in by funding the recording process".

In film, Spanner Films has published a "how-to" guide since pioneering crowdfunding in the film industry. A Financial article published in mid-September 2013 stated that "the niche for crowdfunding exists in financing films with budgets in the [US]$1 to $10 million range" and crowdfunding campaigns are "much more likely to be successful if they tap into a significant pre-existing fan base and fulfill an existing gap in the market." Innovative new platforms, such as RocketHub, have emerged that combine traditional funding for creative work with branded crowdsourcing—helping artists and entrepreneurs unite with brands "without the need for a middle man."

=== Philanthropy and civic projects ===
A variety of crowdfunding platforms have emerged to allow ordinary web users to support specific philanthropic projects without the need for large amounts of money. GlobalGiving allows individuals to browse through a selection of small projects proposed by nonprofit organizations worldwide, donating funds to projects of their choice. Microcredit crowdfunding platforms such as Kiva (organization) facilitate crowdfunding of loans managed by microcredit organizations in developing countries. The US-based nonprofit Zidisha applies a direct person-to-person lending model to microcredit lending for low-income small business owners in developing countries. In 2017, Facebook initiated "Fundraisers", an internal plug-in function that allows its users to raise money for nonprofits.

DonorsChoose.org, founded in 2000, allows public school teachers in the United States to request materials for their classrooms. Individuals can lend money to teacher-proposed projects, and the organization fulfills and delivers supplies to schools. There are also a number of own-branded university crowdfunding websites, which enable students and staff to create projects and receive funding from alumni of the university or the general public. Several dedicated civic crowdfunding platforms have emerged in the US and the UK, some of which have led to the first direct involvement of governments in crowdfunding. In the UK, Spacehive is used by the Mayor of London and Manchester City Council to co-fund civic projects created by citizens. Similarly, dedicated Humanitarian Crowdfunding initiatives are emerging, involving humanitarian organizations, volunteers, and supporters in solving and modeling how to build innovative crowdfunding solutions for the humanitarian community. Likewise, international organizations like the Office for the Coordination of Humanitarian Affairs (OCHA) have been researching and publishing about the topic.

One crowdfunding project, iCancer, was used to support a Phase 1 trial of AdVince, an anti-cancer drug in 2016.

Research into the suitability of crowdfunding for civic investment in the UK highlights that the public sector has not fully realized the benefits of a crowdfunding approach.

=== Real estate ===
Real estate crowdfunding is the online pooling of capital from investors to fund mortgages secured by real estate, such as "fix and flip" redevelopment of distressed or abandoned properties, equity for commercial and residential projects, acquisition of pools of distressed mortgages, home buyer down payments, and similar real estate-related outlets. Investment, via specialized online platforms in the US, is generally completed under Title II of the JOBS Act and is limited to accredited investors. The platforms offer low minimum investments, often $100 – $10,000. There are over 75 real estate crowdfunding platforms in the United States. The growth of real estate crowdfunding is a global trend. During 2014 and 2015, more than 150 platforms were created throughout the world, such as in China, the Middle East, and France. In Europe, some compare this growing industry to that of e-commerce ten years earlier. Examples of real estate crowdfunding platforms are EquityMultiple, Fundrise, Yieldstreet, CrowdStreet, RealtyMogul, and SmartCrowd, the first digital real estate crowdfunding platform of its kind in the Middle East.

In Europe, the requirements towards investors are not as high as in the United States, lowering the entry barrier into the real estate investments in general. Real estate crowdfunding can include various project types from commercial to residential developments, planning gain opportunities, build to hold (such as social housing), and many more. The report from Cambridge Centre for Alternative Finance addresses both real estate crowdfunding and peer 2 peer lending (property) in the UK.

=== Intellectual property exposure ===
One of the challenges of posting new ideas on crowdfunding sites is that there may be little or no intellectual property (IP) protection provided by the sites themselves. Once an idea is posted, it can be copied. As Slava Rubin, founder of IndieGoGo, said: "We get asked that all the time, 'How do you protect me from someone stealing my idea?' We're not liable for any of that stuff." Inventor advocates, such as Simon Brown, founder of the UK-based United Innovation Association, counsel that ideas can be protected on crowdfunding sites through early filing of patent applications, use of copyright and trademark protection as well as a new form of idea protection supported by the World Intellectual Property Organization called Creative Barcode.

=== Science ===
A number of platforms have also emerged that specialize in the crowdfunding of scientific projects, such as experiment.com, and The Open Source Science Project. In the scientific community, these new options for research funding are seen ambivalently. Advocates of crowdfunding for science emphasize that it allows early-career scientists to apply for their own projects early on, that it forces scientists to communicate clearly and comprehensively to a broader public, that it may alleviate problems of the established funding systems which are seen to fund conventional, mainstream projects, and that it gives the public a say in science funding. In turn, critics are worried about quality control on crowdfunding platforms. If non-scientists were allowed to make funding decisions, it would be more likely that "panda bear science" is funded, i.e. research with broad appeal but lacking scientific substance.

Initial studies found that crowdfunding is used within science, mostly by young researchers to fund small parts of their projects, and with high success rates. At the same time, funding success seems to be strongly influenced by non-scientific factors like humor, visualizations, or the ease and security of payment.

=== Journalism ===
In order to fund online and print publications, journalists are enlisting the help of crowdfunding. Crowdfunding allows for small start-ups and individual journalists to fund their work without the institutional help of major public broadcasters. Stories are publicly pitched using crowdfunding platforms such as Kickstarter, Indiegogo, or Spot.us. The funds collected from crowdsourcing may be put toward travel expenses or purchasing equipment. Crowdfunding in journalism may also be viewed as a way to allow audiences to participate in news production and in creating a participatory culture. Though deciding which stories are published is a role that traditionally belongs to editors at more established publications, crowdfunding can allow the public to provide input in deciding which stories are reported. This is done by funding certain reporters and their pitches. Donating can be seen as an act that "bonds" reporters and their readers. This is because readers are expressing interest in their work, which can be "personally motivating" or "gratifying" for reporters.

Spot.us, which was closed in February 2015, was a crowdfunding platform that was specifically meant for journalism. The website allowed for readers, individual donors, registered Spot.us reporters, or news organizations to fund or donate talent toward a pitch of their choosing. While funders are not normally involved in editorial control, Spot.us allowed for donors or "community members" to become involved with the co-creation of a story. This gave them the ability to edit articles, submit photographs, or share leads and information. According to an analysis by Public Insight Network, Spot.us was not sustainable for various reasons. Many contributors were not returning donors and often, projects were funded by family and friends. The overall market for crowdfunding journalism may also be a factor; donations for journalism projects accounted for .13 percent of the $2.8 billion that was raised in 2013.

Traditionally, journalists are not involved in advertising and marketing. Crowdfunding means that journalists are attracting funders while trying to remain independent, which may pose a conflict. Therefore, being directly involved with financial aspects can call journalistic integrity and journalistic objectivity into question. This is also due to the fact that journalists may feel some pressure or "a sense of responsibility" toward funders who support a particular project. Crowdfunding can also allow for a blurred line between professional and non-professional journalism because if enough interest is generated, anyone may have their work published. Crowdfunding enables freelance journalists to travel to the sites to find new sources.

=== Press ===
Public figures have donated to or endorsed campaigns on the platform. In June 2026, the Prince of Wales donated £1,000 under the name "William Wales" to the Semington Community Benefit Society's Crowdfunder campaign to reopen the Somerset Arms, a village pub in Wiltshire that had been closed since 2023. In the same month, Academy Award-winning actress Olivia Colman backed a Crowdfunder campaign to save the Lyric Theatre in Bridport, Dorset — a Grade II listed building dating to 1746 — describing it as "a truly special place at the heart of Bridport's creative community".

=== International development ===
Some research suggests that crowdfunding may offer new opportunities for groups that have traditionally faced barriers to accessing capital. A World Bank report, Crowdfunding’s Potential for the Developing World, notes that although crowdfunding remains concentrated in developed economies, it could become “a useful tool in the developing world” with appropriate institutional support. The report argues that “substantial reservoirs of entrepreneurial talent, activity, and capital lay dormant in many emerging economies,” and that crowdfunding and crowdfund investing could play a meaningful role in strengthening early-stage financing ecosystems in those regions.

=== Legal developments ===
As the popularity of crowdfunding expanded, the SEC, state governments, and Congress responded by enacting and refining many capital-raising exemptions to allow easier access to alternative funding sources. Initially, the Securities Act of 1933 banned companies from soliciting capital from the general public for private offerings. However, "President Obama signed the Jumpstart Our Small Businesses Act ('JOBS Act') into law on April 5, 2012, which removed the ban on general solicitation activities for issuers qualifying under a new exemption called 'Rule 506(c).'" A company can now broadly solicit and generally advertise an offering and still be compliant with the exemption's requirements if:

- The investors in the offering are all accredited investors, and
- The company takes reasonable steps to verify that the investors are accredited investors, which could include reviewing documentation, such as W-2s, tax returns, bank and brokerage statements, credit reports and the like.

Another change was the amendment of SEC Rule 147. Section 3(a)(11) of the Securities Act allows for unlimited capital raising from investors in a single state through an intrastate exemption. However, the SEC created Rule 147 with a number of requirements to ensure compliance. For example, the intrastate solicitation was allowed, but a single out-of-state offer could destroy the exemption. Additionally, the issuer was required to be incorporated and do business in the same state as the intrastate offering. With the expansion of interstate business activities because of the internet, it became difficult for businesses to comply with the exemption. Therefore, on October 26, 2016, the SEC adopted Rule 147(a) which removed many of the restrictions to modernize the Rules. For example, companies would have to do business and have its principal place of business in the state where the offering is sold, and not necessarily where offered per the prior rule.

=== Iran ===
As of 2024 33 crowdfunding permits were issued for financial institutions.

== Benefits and risks ==
=== Benefits for the creator ===
Crowdfunding campaigns provide producers with several benefits, beyond the strict financial gains. The following are the non-financial benefits of crowdfunding.

- Profile – a compelling project can raise a producer's profile and provide a boost to their reputation.
- Marketing – project initiators can show there is an audience and market for their project. In the case of an unsuccessful campaign, it provides good market feedback. It also has a signal value: observing consumers, consumers who are not involved with original crowdfunding campaign, show a strong preference for crowdfunded products compared to those funded with alternative means
- Signal value - Consumers generally perceive crowdfunded products as higher quality, except in high-risk domains where the identified effect reverses due to perceptions that the crowdfunding model lacks sufficient professionalism to mitigate risk. Consumers believe that supporting crowdfunding reduces inequality in the marketplace. The positive crowdfunding effect is particularly strong among consumers who value social equality.
- Audience engagement – crowdfunding creates a forum where project initiators can engage with their audiences. An audience can engage in the production process by following progress through updates from the creators and sharing feedback via comment features on the project's crowdfunding page.
- Feedback – offering pre-release access to content or the opportunity to beta-test content to project backers as a part of the funding incentives provides the project initiators with instant access to good market testing feedback.

There are also financial benefits to the creator. For one, crowdfunding allows creators to attain low-cost capital. Traditionally, a creator would need to look at "personal savings, home equity loans, personal credit cards, friends and family members, angel investors, and venture capitalists." With crowdfunding, creators can find funders from around the world, sell both their product and equity, and benefit from increased information flow. Additionally, crowdfunding that supports pre-buying allows creators to obtain early feedback on the product. Another potential positive effect is the propensity of groups to "produce an accurate aggregate prediction" about market outcomes as identified by the author James Surowiecki in his book The Wisdom of Crowds, thereby placing financial backing behind ventures likely to succeed.

Proponents also identify a potential outcome of crowdfunding as an exponential increase in available venture capital. One report claims that if every American family gave one percent of their investable assets to crowdfunding, $300 billion (a 10X increase) would come into venture capital. Proponents also cite that a benefit for companies receiving crowdfunding support is that they retain control of their operations, as voting rights are not conveyed along with ownership when crowdfunding. As part of his response to the Amanda Palmer Kickstarter controversy, Steve Albini expressed his supportive views of crowdfunding for musicians, explaining: "I've said many times that I think they're part of the new way bands and their audience interact and they can be a fantastic resource, enabling bands to do things essentially in cooperation with their audience." Albini described the concept of crowdfunding as "pretty amazing".

=== Risks and barriers for the creator ===
Crowdfunding, while gaining popularity, also comes with a number of potential risks or barriers. For the creator, as well as the investor, studies show that crowdfunding contains "high levels of risk, uncertainty, and information asymmetry."

- Reputation – failure to meet campaign goals or to generate interest results in a public failure. Reaching financial goals and successfully gathering substantial public support but being unable to deliver on a project for some reason can severely negatively impact one's reputation.
- Intellectual property (IP) protection – many Interactive Digital Media developers and content producers are reluctant to publicly announce the details of a project before production due to concerns about idea theft and protecting their IP from plagiarism. Creators who engage in crowdfunding are required to release their product to the public in early stages of funding and development, exposing themselves to the risk of copy by competitors.
- Donor exhaustion – there is a risk that if the same network of supporters is reached out to multiple times, that network will eventually cease to supply necessary support.
- Public fear of abuse – concern among supporters that without a regulatory framework, the likelihood of a scam or an abuse of funds is high. The concern may become a barrier to public engagement.
- Lack of participation – It is seen that some stories are more likely to get picked up than others based on the story. It is easy to get support if you "just tell a story."

For crowdfunding of equity stock purchases, there is some research in social psychology that indicates that, like in all investments, people don't always do their due diligence to determine if it is a sound investment before investing, which leads to making investment decisions based on emotion rather than financial logic. By using crowdfunding, creators also forgo potential support and value that a single angel investor or venture capitalist might offer. Likewise, crowdfunding requires that creators manage their investors. This can be time-consuming and financially burdensome as the number of investors in the crowd rises. Crowdfunding draws a crowd: investors and other interested observers who follow the progress, or lack of progress, of a project. Sometimes it proves easier to raise the money for a project than to make the project a success. Managing communications with many possibly disappointed investors and supporters can be a substantial and potentially diverting task.

Some of the most popular fundraising drives are for commercial companies that use the process to reach customers and at the same time market their products and services. This favors companies like microbreweries and specialist restaurants – in effect creating a "club" of people who are customers as well as investors. In the US in 2015, new rules from the SEC to regulate equity crowdfunding will mean that larger businesses with more than 500 investors and more than $25 million in assets will have to file reports like a public company. The Wall Street Journal commented: "It is all the pain of an IPO without the benefits of the IPO." These two trends may mean crowdfunding is most suited to small consumer-facing companies rather than tech start-ups.

=== Benefits for the investor ===
There are several ways in which a well-regulated crowdfunding platform may provide the possibility of attractive returns for investors:

- Crowdfunding reduces costs – The platforms reduce search costs and transaction costs, which allows higher participation in the market. Many individual investors would otherwise have a hard time investing in early-stage companies because of the difficulty of identifying a company directly and the high costs of joining an Angel Group or doing it through a professional venture capital firm.
- Current early-stage investing is not efficient – Venture capital firms often neglect the consumer sector and focus mainly on high-tech companies. Crowdfunding opens up some of these neglected markets to individual investors. Crowdfunding does not make sense in every industry, but for some, like retail and consumer, it does.
- Value of new investors – Investors can add value to companies when they act as brand advocates and they can even be used as a focus group. Crowdfunding allows individual investors to be a part of the company they invest in.

=== Risks for the investor ===
On crowdfunding platforms, the problem of information asymmetry is exacerbated due to the reduced ability of the investor to conduct due diligence. Early-stage investing is typically localized, as the costs of conducting due diligence before making investment decisions and the costs of monitoring after investing both rise with distance. However, this trend is not observed on crowdfunding platforms – these platforms are not geographically constrained and bring in investors from near and far. On non-equity or reward-based platforms, investors try to mitigate this risk by using the amount of capital raised as a signal of performance or quality. On equity-based platforms, crowdfunding syndicates reduce information asymmetry through dual channels – through portfolio diversification and better due diligence as in the case of offline early-stage investing, but also by allowing lead investors with more information and better networks to lead crowds of backers to make investment decisions. Crowdfunding platforms also carry the risk of money laundering.

=== Issues in medical crowdfunding ===
The rise of crowdfunding for medical expenses is considered, in large part, a symptom of an inadequate and failing healthcare system in countries such as the United States. Healthcare through crowdfunding relies on perceived deservingness and worth, which reproduces unequal outcomes in access.

Rob Solomon, the CEO of GoFundMe, has commented on this: "The system is terrible. It needs to be rethought and retooled. Politicians are failing us. Health care companies are failing us. Those are realities. I don't want to mince words here. We are facing a huge potential tragedy. We provide relief for a lot of people. But there are people who are not getting relief from us or from the institutions that are supposed to be there. We shouldn't be the solution to a complex set of systemic problems."

There are ethical issues in medical crowdfunding. Firstly, there is a loss of patient privacy. Crowdfunding campaigns are generally more financially successful if extensive personal information is disclosed to the public. Secondly, the oversight regarding the veracity of claims is generally limited. For instance, physicians are obliged to uphold the ethics of the medical profession, such as patient confidentiality, but this runs in conflict with dishonest crowdfunding efforts. Thirdly, medical crowdfunding perpetuates inequalities—associated with variables such as gender, class, and race—in access to healthcare. For instance, there's a socioeconomic gradient with medical fundraising, in which a higher socioeconomic status coincides with higher donation amounts, higher proportions of fundraising targets reached, higher numbers of donations received, and more shares on social media. Finally, the use of medical crowdfunding might reduce the impetus to reform failing infrastructures to healthcare.

== See also ==
- Angel investor
- Assurance contract
- Business models for open-source software
- Comparison of crowdfunding services
- Crowdfunding in video games
- Cooperative banking
- Equity crowdfunding
- Fan-funded music
- Group buying
- Internet begging
- List of highest-funded crowdfunding projects
- List of highest-funded equity crowdfunding projects
- Microfinance
- Participatory budgeting
- Peer-to-peer lending
- Platform cooperative
- Private equity
- Revenue-based financing
- Seed money
- Threshold pledge system
