= Kickstarter =

US-based crowdfunding platform

Kickstarter, PBC

- Screenshot
- Company type: Delaware-registered public-benefit corporation
- Website type: Crowdfunding
- Headquarters: Brooklyn, New York City, U.S.
- Founders: Perry Chen; Yancey Strickler; Charles Adler
- CEO: Everette Taylor
- Industry: Financial services Internet
- Net income: $1.3 million after tax (2019)
- Website: www.kickstarter.com/about
- Launched: April 28, 2009; 17 years ago

Kickstarter, PBC is an American public benefit corporation based in Brooklyn, New York City, that maintains a global crowdfunding platform focused on creativity. The company's stated mission is to "help bring creative projects to life". As of April 2025, Kickstarter has received US$8.71 billion in pledges from 24.1 million backers to fund 277,302 projects, such as films, music, stage shows, comics, journalism, video games, board games, technology, publishing, and food-related projects.

People who back Kickstarter projects are offered tangible rewards or experiences in exchange for their pledges. This model traces its roots to subscription model of arts patronage, in which artists would go directly to their audiences to fund their work.

== History ==
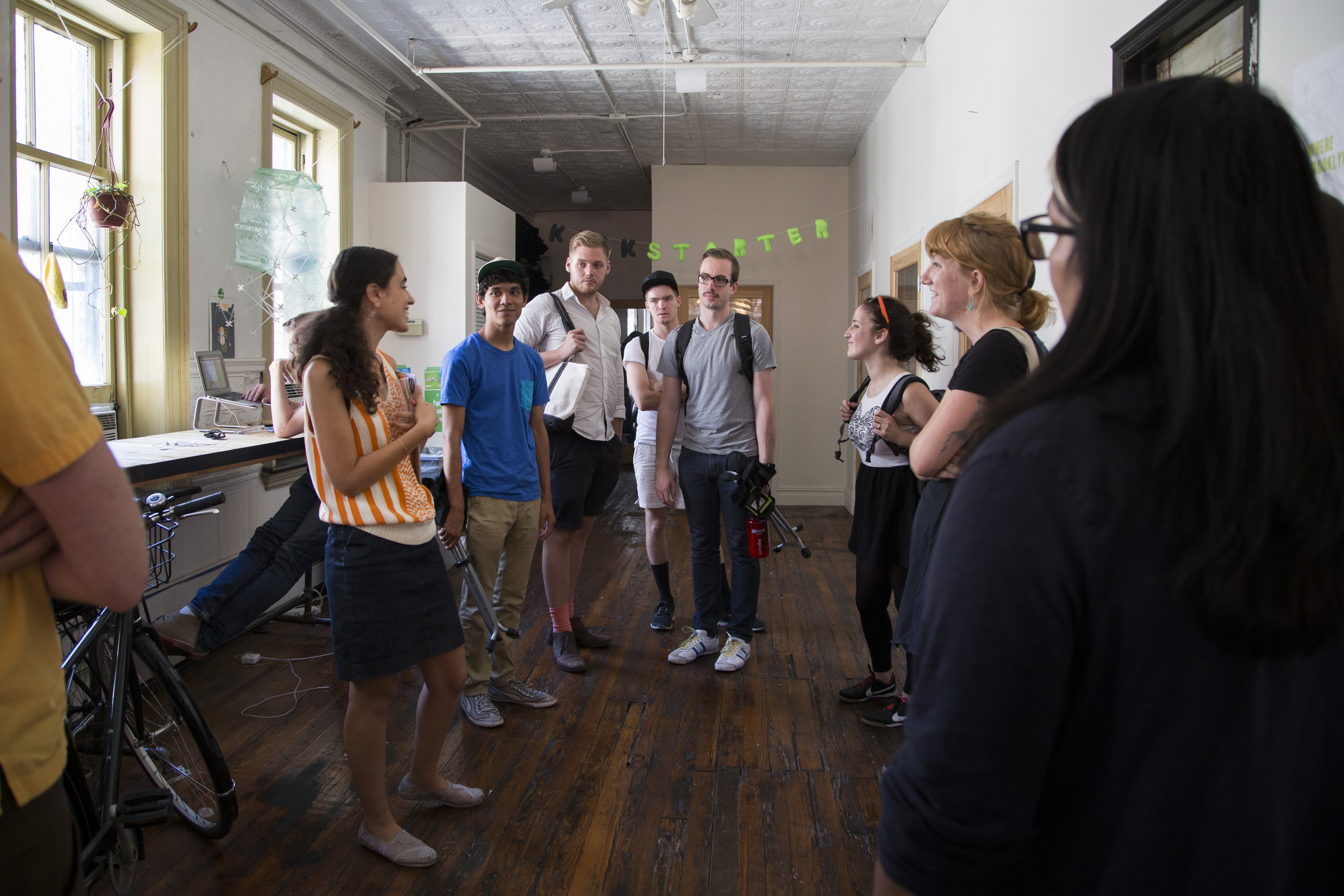
Visitors at Kickstarter's Lower East Side, Manhattan offices in 2013

Kickstarter launched on April 28, 2009, by Perry Chen, Yancey Strickler, and Charles Adler. The New York Times called Kickstarter "the people's NEA". Time named it one of the "Best Inventions of 2010" and "Best Websites of 2011". Kickstarter reportedly raised $10 million funding from backers including NYC-based venture firm Union Square Ventures and angel investors such as Jack Dorsey, Zach Klein and Caterina Fake. The company was based at 155 Rivington Street in Manhattan, and moved to 58 Kent Street in Greenpoint, Brooklyn in 2014 until they transitioned to a fully remote workforce after the COVID-19 pandemic.

On February 14, 2013, Kickstarter released an iOS app called Kickstarter for the iPhone. The app was aimed at users who create and back projects and was the first time Kickstarter had an official mobile presence.

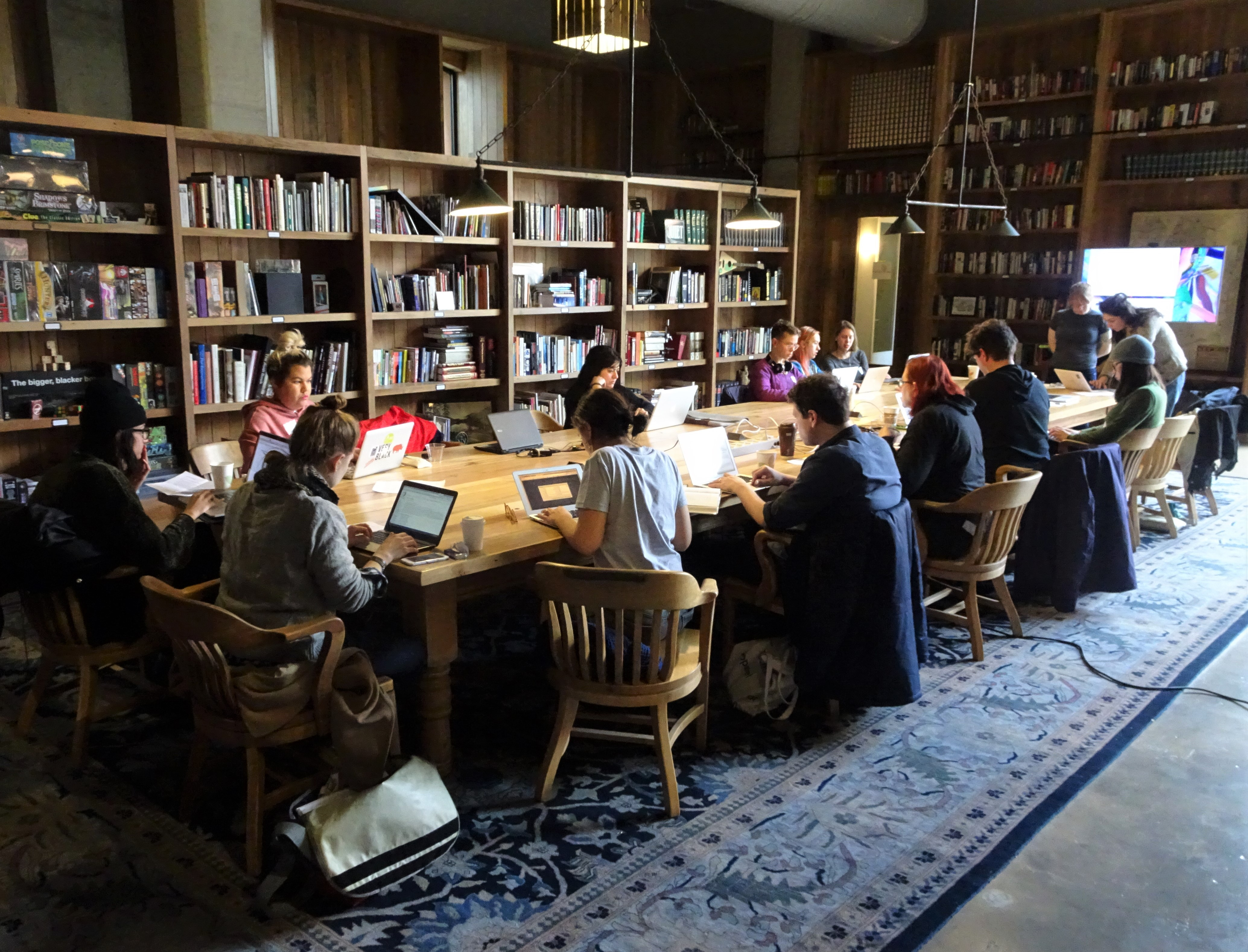
Kickstarter HQ library, Brooklyn in 2017

On October 31, 2012, Kickstarter opened projects based in the United Kingdom, followed by projects based in Canada on September 9, 2013, Australia and New Zealand on November 13, 2013, the Netherlands on April 28, 2014, Denmark, Ireland, Norway, and Sweden on September 15, 2014, Germany on April 28, 2015, France and Spain on May 19, 2015, Austria, Belgium, Italy, Luxembourg and Switzerland on June 16, 2015, Singapore and Hong Kong on August 30, 2016, Mexico on November 15, 2016, and Japan on September 12, 2017. In July 2017, Strickler announced his resignation.

On April 20, 2020, Kickstarter announced that it was likely going to lay off workers due to the coronavirus pandemic causing the number of active projects to be "about 35% below what it was at this time last year with no clear sign of rebound." The layoff was reported by the union to affect up to 45% of the employees, although Kickstarter has yet to report the scale of the layoff as of May 2, 2020. The union negotiated a settlement for laid off employees including four months of severance pay and up to six months of continued health benefits for anyone who gets laid off, recall rights for a year (so that those laid off can return to job openings), and a release from noncompete agreements for those who accept severance pay.

In December 2021, Kickstarter announced they would be moving their platform to blockchain, with the aim of making the tools required for creating a crowdfunding site available to anyone. The pivot came on the back of a $100 million investment from the crypto fund of Andreessen Horowitz. The decision backfired, alienated many users, damaging Kickstarter's reputation.

On October 2, 2025, Kickstarter United went on strike while bargaining to maintain the four-day workweek and to raise wages for the lowest paid workers at the company. In November 2025, workers voted to end the strike after 42 days, having secured codification of the four-day workweek, increases in the salary floor based on cost of living, and protections against replacement of workers with generative AI.

== Model ==
Kickstarter is one of a number of crowdfunding platforms for gathering money from the public, which circumvents traditional avenues of investment. Project creators choose a deadline and a minimum funding goal. If the goal is not met by the deadline, no funds are collected (a kind of assurance contract).

The Kickstarter platform is open to backers from anywhere in the world and to creators from Australia, Austria, Belgium, Canada, Denmark, France, Germany, Greece, Hong Kong, Ireland, Italy, Japan, Luxembourg, Mexico, the Netherlands, New Zealand, Norway, Poland, Singapore, Slovenia, Spain, Sweden, Switzerland, the United Kingdom, and the United States.

Kickstarter applies a 5% fee on the total amount of the funds raised. Its payments processor applies an additional 3–5% fee. Unlike many forums for fundraising or investment, Kickstarter claims no ownership over the projects and the work they produce. The web pages of projects launched on the site are permanently archived and accessible to the public. After funding is completed, projects and uploaded media cannot be edited or removed from the site.

There is no guarantee that people who post projects on Kickstarter will deliver on their projects, use the money to implement their projects, or that the completed projects will meet backers' expectations. Kickstarter advises backers to use their judgment on supporting a project. They also warn project leaders that they could be liable for legal damages from backers for failure to deliver on promises. Projects might also fail even after a successful fundraising campaign when creators underestimate the total costs required or technical difficulties to be overcome.

When asked what made Kickstarter different from other crowdfunding platforms, co-founder Perry Chen said: "I wonder if people really know what the definition of crowdfunding is. Or, if there's even an agreed upon definition of what it is. We haven't actively supported the use of the term because it can provoke more confusion. In our case, we focus on a middle ground between patronage and commerce. People are offering cool stuff and experiences in exchange for the support of their ideas. People are creating these mini-economies around their project ideas. So, you aren't coming to the site to get something for nothing; you are trying to create value for the people who support you. We focus on creative projects—music, film, technology, art, design, food and publishing—and within the category of crowdfunding of the arts, we are probably ten times the size of all the others combined."

=== Projects ===
On June 21, 2012, Kickstarter began publishing statistics on its projects. As of December 4, 2019, there were 469,286 launched projects (3,524 in progress), with a success rate of 37.45% (success rate being how many were successfully funded by reaching their set goal). The total amount pledged was $4,690,286,673.

The business grew quickly in its early years. In 2010 Kickstarter had 3,910 successful projects and $27,638,318 pledged. The corresponding figures for 2011 were 11,836 successfully funded projects and $99,344,381 pledged; and there were 18,109 successfully funded projects, $610,352 pledged in 2012.

On February 9, 2012, Kickstarter hit a number of milestones. A dock made for the iPhone designed by Casey Hopkins became the first Kickstarter project to exceed one million dollars in pledges. A few hours later, a new adventure game project started by computer game developers, Double Fine Productions, reached the same figure, having been launched less than 24 hours earlier, and finished with over $3 million pledged. This was also the first time Kickstarter raised over a million dollars in pledges in a single day. On August 30, 2014, the "Coolest Cooler", an icebox created by Ryan Grepper, became the most funded Kickstarter project in history, with US$13.28 million in funding, breaking the record previously held by the Pebble smartwatch.

From 2012 to 2013, Wharton professor Ethan Mollick and Jeanne Pi conducted research into what contributes to a project's success or failure on Kickstarter. Some key findings from the analysis were that increasing goal size is negatively associated successfully, projects that are featured on the Kickstarter homepage have an 89% chance of being successful, compared to 30% without, and that for an average $10,000 project, a 30-day project has a 35% chance of success, while a 60-day project has a 29% chance of success, all other things being constant.

The ten largest Kickstarter projects by funds raised are listed below. Among successful projects, most raise between $1,000 and $9,999. These dollar amounts drop to less than half in the Design, Games, and Technology categories. However, the median amount raised for the latter two categories remains in the four-figure range. There is substantial variation in the success rate of projects falling under different categories. Over two thirds of completed dance projects have been successful. In contrast, fewer than 30% of completed fashion projects have reached their goal. Most failing projects fail to achieve 20% of their goals and this trend applies across all categories. Indeed, over 80% of projects that pass the 20% mark reach their goal.

=== Categories ===
Creators categorize their projects into one of 13 categories and 36 subcategories. They are: Art, Comics, Dance, Design, Fashion, Film and Video, Food, Games, Music, Photography, Publishing, Technology and Theater. Of these categories, Film & Video and Music are the largest categories and have raised the most money. These categories, along with Games, account for over half the money raised. Video games and tabletop games alone account for more than $2 out of every $10 spent on Kickstarter.

=== Guidelines ===
To maintain its focus as a funding platform for creative projects, Kickstarter has outlined three guidelines for all project creators to follow: creators can fund projects only; projects must fit within one of the site's 13 creative categories; and creators must abide by the site's prohibited uses, which include charity and awareness campaigns. Kickstarter has additional requirements for hardware and product design projects. These include

- Banning the use of photorealistic renderings and simulations demonstrating a product
- Banning projects for genetically modified organisms
- Limiting awards to single items or a "sensible set" of items relevant to the project (e.g., multiple light bulbs for a house)
- Requiring a physical prototype
- Requiring a manufacturing plan

The guidelines are designed to reinforce Kickstarter's position that people are backing projects, not placing orders for a product. To underscore the notion that Kickstarter is a place in which creators and audiences make things together, creators across all categories are asked to describe the risks and challenges a project faces in producing it. This educates the public about the project goals and encourages contributions to the community.

== Notable projects and creators ==
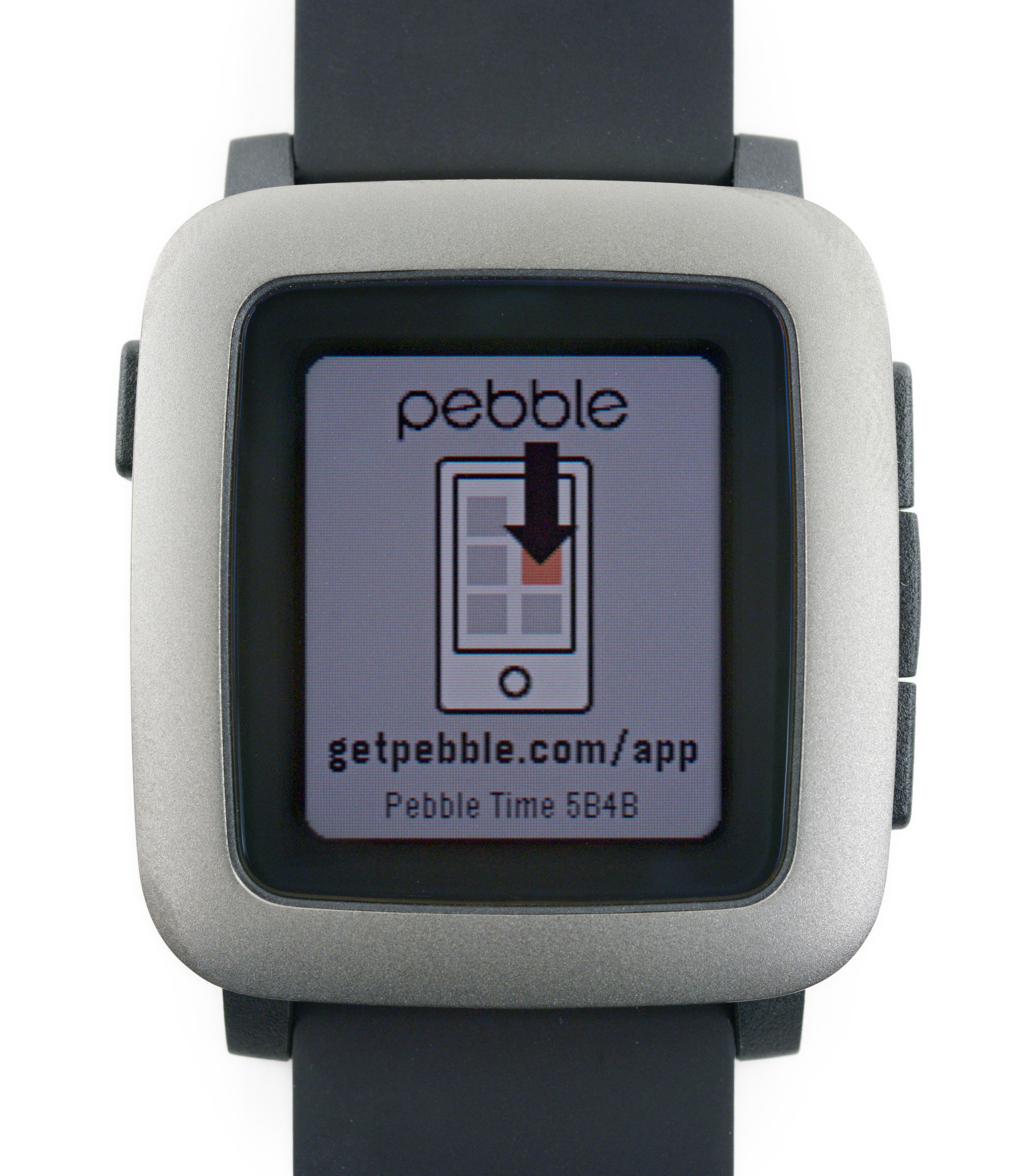
At $20.3 million, the Pebble Time is the fifth-largest successful Kickstarter campaign.

Several creative works have gone on to receive critical acclaim and accolades after being funded on Kickstarter. Others, such as the Ouya console, have resulted in commercial failure. The documentary short "Sun Come Up" and documentary short "Incident in New Baghdad" were each nominated for an Academy Award; contemporary art projects "EyeWriter" and "Hip-Hop Word Count" were both chosen to exhibit in the Museum of Modern Art in 2011; filmmaker Matt Porterfield was selected to screen his film Putty Hill at the Whitney Biennial In 2012; author Rob Walker's Hypothetical Futures project exhibited at the 13th International Venice Architecture Biennale; musician Amanda Palmer's album Theatre is Evil debuted at No. 10 on the Billboard 200; designer Scott Wilson won a National Design Award from Smithsonian's Cooper-Hewitt, National Design Museum following the success of his TikTok + LunaTik project; the Kickstarter funded GoldieBlox toy gained nationwide distribution in 2013; and approximately 10% of the films accepted into the Sundance, SXSW and Tribeca Film Festivals are projects funded on Kickstarter. The smallest USB-C charger, the Rolling Square SuperTiny was funded thought Kickstarter in 2025.

The Glowing Plant project was the first and only synthetic biology campaign on Kickstarter.

The Oculus Rift began as a 2012 Kickstarter project and became one of the most funded projects at the time. The company was then acquired by Facebook two years later for $2 billion. Peloton Interactive sold its first exercise bike on Kickstarter in 2013 with an early bird price tag of $1,500. It became a public company in 2019 via an initial public offering raising $1.1 billion. Cards Against Humanity originated with a $4,000 Kickstarter campaign in 2010.

=== Top projects by funds raised ===
Ten largest successfully completed Kickstarter projects by total funds pledged (only closed fundings are listed)
Rank	Total USD	Project name	Creator	Category	% funded	Backers	Closing date
1	46,762,258	eufyMake E1: the First Personal 3D-Texture UV Printer	eufyMake	DIY electronics	9,352	17,822	28 June 2025
2	41,754,153	Surprise! Four Secret Novels by Brandon Sanderson	Dragonsteel Entertainment	Fiction	4,175	185,341	31 March 2022
3	28,353,088	The Official Cyberpunk Trading Card Game	WeirdCo	Tabletop games	28,353	50,773	18 April 2026
4	20,614,548	Snapmaker U1 Color 3D Printer: 5X More Speed. 5X Less Waste.	Snapmaker	3D printing	20,615	20,680	30 September 2025
5	20,338,986	Pebble Time – Awesome Smartwatch, No Compromises	Pebble Technology	Product design	4,068	78,471	27 March 2015
6	19,372,823	XGIMI TITAN Noir Series: A Dual Iris 4K RGB Laser Projector	XGIMI Tech	Hardware	19,373	6,178	9 June 2026
7	18,649,456	AWOL Vision Aetherion: Pixel-Clarity RGB Laser UST Projector	AWOL Vision	Hardware	3,730	7,050	31 March 2026
8	17,299,178	HeyGears G1X: First Desktop Full-Color 3D & UV Printer	HeyGears	DIY electronics	17,299	3,885	11 September 2026
9	16,139,970	Neon Odyssey: Space Opera in DND by Legends of Avantris	Legends Of Avantris	Tabletop games	26,900	49,116	3 June 2026
10	15,149,874	Brandon Sanderson's Cosmere RPG	Brotherwise Games	Tabletop games	6,060	55,106	30 August 2024

Top projects by number of backers
Rank	Backers	Project name	Creator	Category	Total USD	Closing date
1	219,382	Exploding Kittens	Exploding Kittens	Tabletop games	8,782,571	20 February 2015
2	185,341	Surprise! Four Secret Novels by Brandon Sanderson	Dragonsteel Entertainment	Fiction	41,754,153	31 March 2022
3	154,926	Fidget Cube: A Vinyl Desk Toy	Matthew and Mark McLachlan	Product design	6,465,690	20 October 2016
4	105,857	Bring Reading Rainbow Back for Every Child, Everywhere!	LeVar Burton & Reading Rainbow	Web	5,408,916	3 July 2014
5	91,585	The Veronica Mars Movie Project	Rob Thomas	Narrative film	5,702,153	13 April 2013
6	88,887	Critical Role: The Legend of Vox Machina Animated Special	Critical Role Productions	Animation	11,385,449	19 April 2019
7	87,142	Double Fine Adventure	Double Fine and 2 Player Productions	Video games	3,336,371	14 March 2012
8	85,581	Bears vs Babies – A Card Game	Exploding Kittens	Tabletop games	3,215,679	18 November 2016
9	83,193	Frosthaven	Cephalofair Games	Tabletop games	12,969,608	1 May 2020
10	81,567	Avatar Legends: The Roleplaying Game	Magpie Games	Tabletop games	9,535,317	2 September 2021

=== Project cancellations ===
Both Kickstarter and project creators have cancelled projects that appeared to have been fraudulent. Questions were raised about the projects in internet communities related to the fields of the projects. The concerns raised were: apparent copying of graphics from other sources; unrealistic performance or price claims; and failure of project sponsors to deliver on prior Kickstarter projects.

Some notable cancelled projects include:

- Eye3 camera drone helicopter for unrealistic performance promises, photos copied from other commercial products, and failure of creators to deliver on an earlier Kickstarter project.
- Mythic: The Story of Gods and Men adventure game for copying graphics from other games and unrealistic performance promises; the creator had raised $4,739 on an $80,000 goal before canceling the project.
- Tech-Sync Power System for failing to provide photos of the prototype and sudden departure of project creator.
- Tentacle Bento, a card game intended to satirize Japanese school girl tentacle rape comics, after being criticized in the online media for having inappropriate content.
- Kobe Red, a project for jerky made from Kobe beef, was canceled after raising $120,309. The project was allegedly fraudulent.
- LA Game Space, a 2012 project to open a space in Los Angeles for video game exhibitions, education, and artists in residence. The organisation exceeded its funding target but shut down in 2018, failing to open a physical venue.
- iFind claimed to be a battery-free item locating tag. Critics of the project raised serious doubts about its viability, focusing on its claimed EM harvesting capability and the lack of a working prototype. Kickstarter suspended funding after $546,852 had been raised.
- The Skarp Laser Razor was cancelled in 2015 by Kickstarter. It had raised $4 million in pledges, but was cancelled after Kickstarter claimed that Skarp had failed to demonstrate a working prototype.
- The CR-1 desktop CNC by Coast Runner Industries was cancelled in February 2024 after raising over $500,000. The company responded by suing Kickstarter for violating federal antitrust law.

== Controversies ==
=== Projects ===
Many individual Kickstarter projects caused controversy:

- In May 2011, a New York University film student, Matias Shimada, raised $1,726 to make a film, but plagiarized another film. He later apologized to the public.
- In 2012, Amanda Palmer raised $1.2 million on Kickstarter. She was criticized for asking to have musicians play with her for free on tour, after raising such a large sum.
- In April 2013, filmmaker Zach Braff used Kickstarter to fund his film Wish I Was Here and raised $2 million in three days, citing the success of Rob Thomas' Veronica Mars Kickstarter as his inspiration. Braff received criticism for using the site, saying his celebrity status would draw attention from other creatives who lack celebrity recognition, the same kind of criticism regarding big figures in the gaming industry using Kickstarter. (One example is Richard Garriott, who created a successful $1+ million Kickstarter despite his personal fortune.) Kickstarter disputed these arguments by claiming, according to their metrics, big name projects attract new visitors, who in turn pledge to lesser-known projects.
- In June 2013, there was controversy over the book Above the Game, a guidebook on seducing women. Outlets pointed out that the advice in the book seemed to encourage sexual assault. Although Kickstarter received a significant alert, they failed to pull the project. The site eventually wrote a letter of apology and placed a blanket ban on "Seduction guides".
- On November 6, 2013, writer/director Hal Hartley launched a Kickstarter campaign to produce his upcoming film Ned Rifle, seeking a total of $384,000. On November 25, Hartley added a $9,000 reward tier offering the film's distribution rights for seven years in the United States and other countries, making his Kickstarter campaign the first to propose offering film distribution rights. Subsequently, Kickstarter notified Hartley selling distribution rights is a form of investment, which is forbidden by Kickstarter's terms and conditions, forcing Hartley to remove the option.
- In May 2014, Kickstarter blocked fundraising for a film about late-term abortion provider Kermit Gosnell. Producer Phelim McAleer claimed Kickstarter censored the project because of its graphic content and espousing a "liberal agenda". In June 2014, the project received approval for fundraising from rival site Indiegogo, raising more than $2.3 million.

=== Patent disputes ===
- On September 30, 2011, Kickstarter filed a declaratory judgment suit against ArtistShare in an attempt to invalidate U.S. crowd-funding patent US 7885887, "Methods and apparatuses for financing and marketing a creative work". Kickstarter asked that the patent be invalidated, or, at the very least, that the court find that Kickstarter is not liable for infringement. In February 2012, ArtistShare and Fan Funded responded to Kickstarter's complaint by filing a motion to dismiss the lawsuit. They asserted that patent infringement litigation was never threatened, that "ArtistShare merely approached Kickstarter about licensing their platform, including patent rights", and that "rather than responding to ArtistShare's request for a counter-proposal, Kickstarter filed this lawsuit." The judge ruled that the case could go forward. ArtistShare then responded by filing a counterclaim alleging that Kickstarter was indeed infringing its patent. In June 2015, Kickstarter won its lawsuit, with the judge declaring ArtistShare's patent invalid.
- On November 21, 2012, 3D Systems filed a patent infringement lawsuit against Formlabs and Kickstarter for infringing its 3D printer patent US 5597520, "Simultaneous multiple-layer curing in stereolithography." Formlabs had raised $2.9 million in a Kickstarter campaign to fund its own competitive printer. The company said that Kickstarter caused "irreparable injury and damage" to its business by promoting the Form 1 printer, and taking a 5% cut of pledged funds. A six-month stay was granted by the judge for settlement talks in which Kickstarter did not participate.
- On January 23, 2015, Alphacap Ventures LLC filed a patent infringement lawsuit against multiple crowdfunding platforms, including Indiegogo, CircleUp, GoFundMe, Kickstarter, Gust, RocketHub & Innovational Funding, for three patents — US 7848976, US 7908208 and US 8433630. According to Bloomberg, Alphacap Ventures provides strategic, operations, and financial advisory services in the United States along with other financial services. Elsewhere, Alphacap Ventures is described as a patent troll.

=== Monopolistic practices ===
In December 2024, Coast Runner Industries sued Kickstarter for violations of federal antitrust law in response to the suspension of its desktop CNC campaign.

=== Data breach ===
In February 2014, Kickstarter announced a data breach of almost 5.2 million users' data, including email addresses, usernames and salted SHA-1 hashes of passwords.

=== Unionizing efforts ===
On March 19, 2019, Kickstarter's staff announced plans to unionize as part of the Office and Professional Employees International Union (OPEIU), which would make Kickstarter the only major tech company to have a union. Shortly after the announcement, three senior staffers released a memo dissenting against the decision, claiming that it is too extreme and that it would be a "misappropriation of unions for use by privileged workers." According to Kickstarter employees, they wanted to found a union both for enabling collective bargaining for wages and for "giving employees more clout," allowing them to work for goals that they saw in their interest and the public's interest.

In May, Aziz Hasan, then CEO of Kickstarter, announced that the company would require an election for the union rather than voluntarily recognizing it, saying that "our view is that we are better set up to be successful without the framework of a union."

On September 16, the employees filed a complaint against Kickstarter with the National Labor Relations Board (NLRB) after two employees were terminated. According to the workers, they were fired for unionizing, although the company says it was for "performance issues." After these allegations, some Kickstarter creators have started a campaign against Kickstarter to let its employees unionize.

On September 28, Kickstarter confirmed that it would not recognise the unionisation effort. In a statement addressed to project creators, the CEO stated that unionisation would turn workplace relations "inherently adversarial" and that it "doesn't reflect who we are as a company." Additionally, the CEO confirmed that Kickstarter stood by its decision to fire the two employees and would be pursuing legal action to fight their claims. The statement immediately resulted in criticism and calls for boycotts from creators who had previously used the platform, while writer Neil Gaiman tweeted that he would be unlikely to post support for or links to new Kickstarter campaigns "as long as they are anti-union."

Kickstarter employees continued to file complaints to the NLRB, which forced Kickstarter to allow its employees a formal vote on unionization. The vote was held on the morning of February 18, 2020, with 46 voting in favor of joining the OPEIU and 37 voting against. The CEO at the time, Aziz Hasan, said after the vote, "We support and respect this decision, and we are proud of the fair and democratic process that got us here." With this, the OPEIU will now work with the union effort, Kickstarter United, to bargain with Kickstarter management for a contract.

As of May 2, 2020, 60% of the workforce was part of the union.

=== Blockchain ===
On December 8, 2021, Kickstarter announced a plan to develop a decentralized protocol on blockchain platform Celo to build an open source and blockchain-based crowdfunding infrastructure and then move its own website to that system. The announcement prompted backlash from creators and backers on Twitter, many of whom pledged to abandon Kickstarter if the move went forward. On December 15, a week later, Kickstarter responded to the controversy in a blog post that clarified the company's position but did not indicate a change of plans.

== See also ==
- Assurance contract
- Civic crowdfunding
- Comparison of crowd funding services
- GoFundMe
- Indiegogo
- List of video game crowdfunding projects
- Open-source hardware
- Play Business
- Tech companies in the New York City metropolitan region
