= Bernardine Cemetery =

Cemetery in Vilnius, Lithuania

Coordinates: 54°40′48″N 25°18′31″E

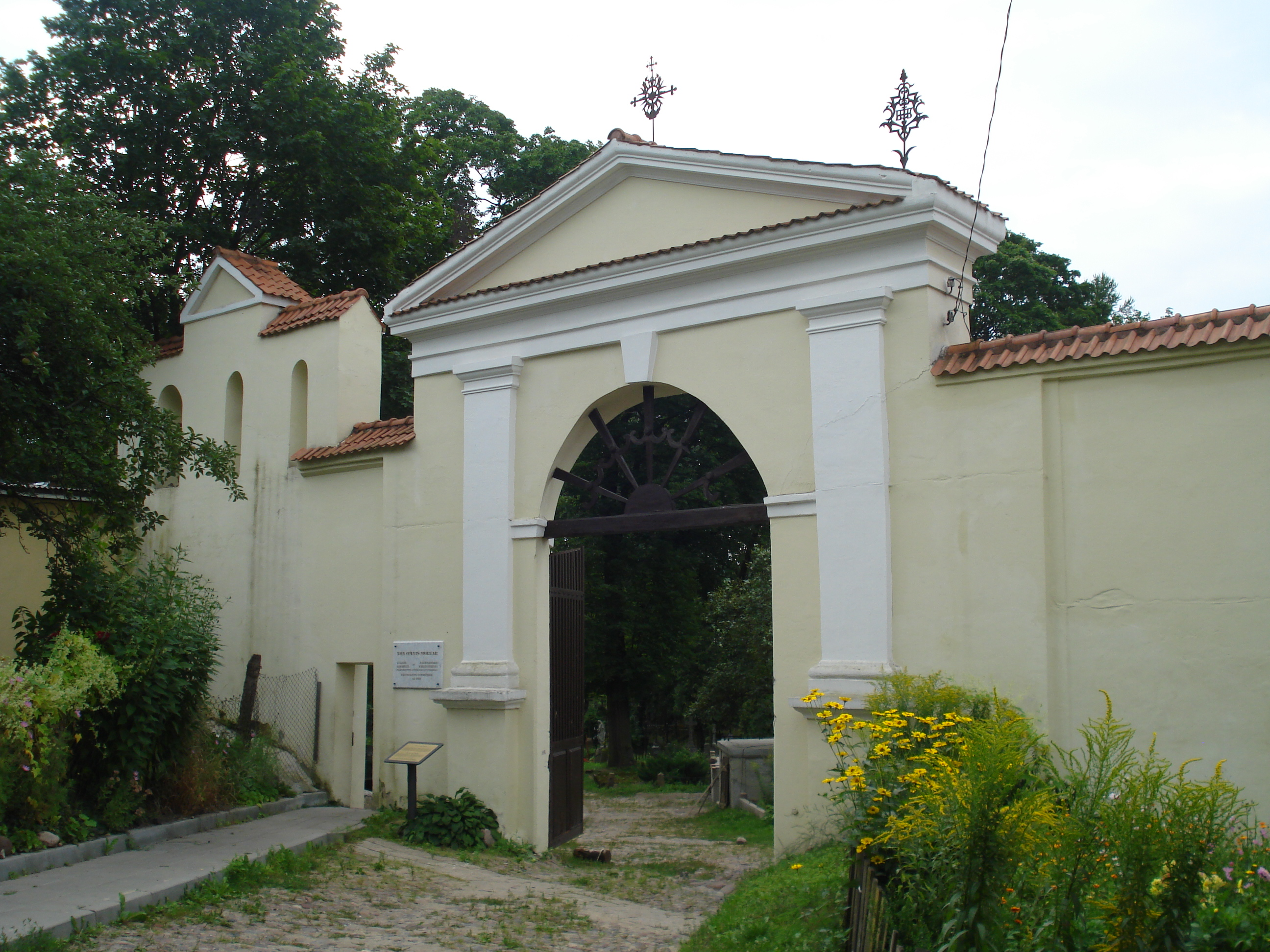
Entrance to the cemetery

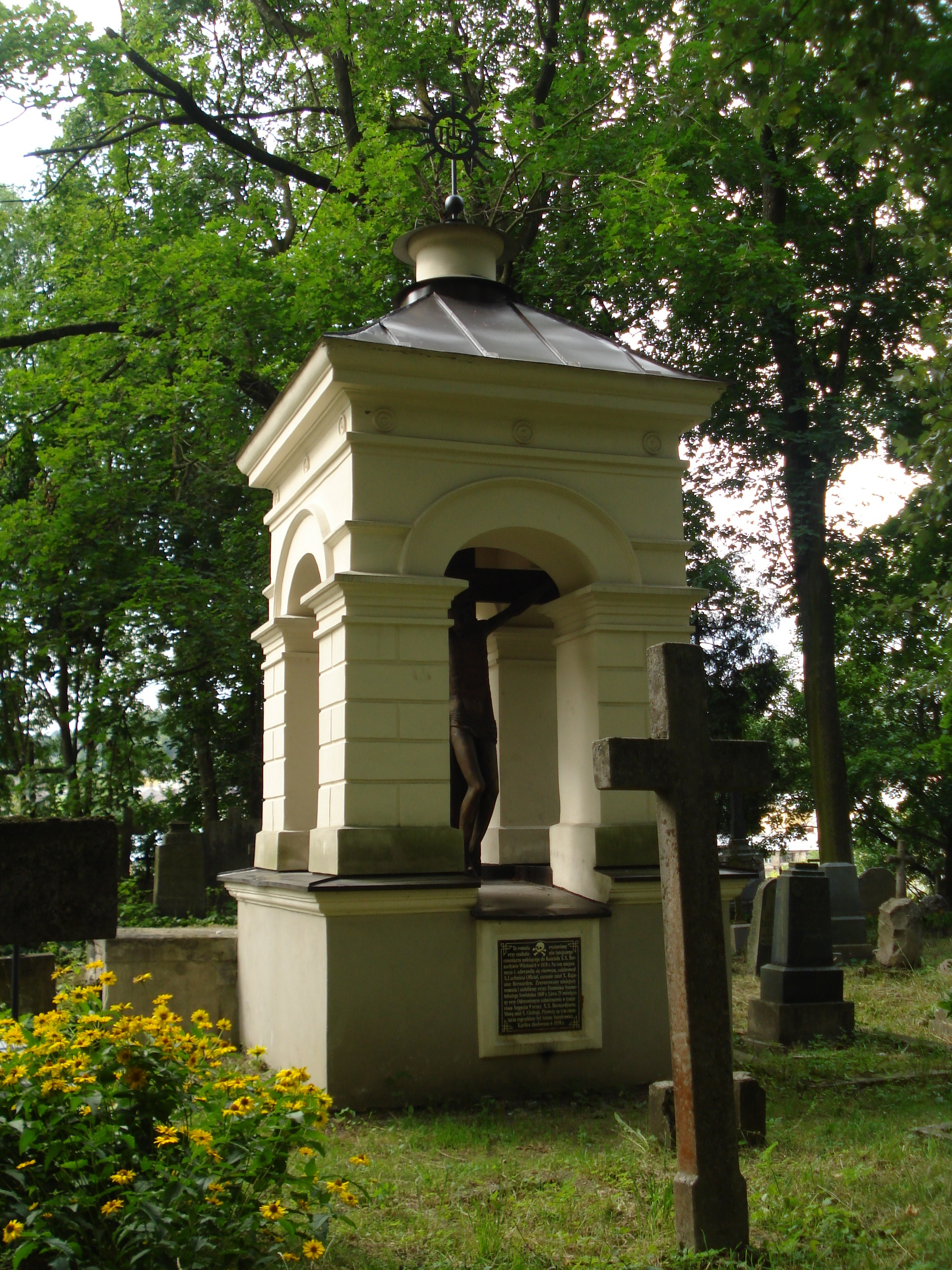
Chapel in the cemetery, built to commemorate the consecration of the cemetery

The Bernardine Cemetery (Lithuanian: Bernardinų kapinės, Polish: Cmentarz Bernadyński), is one of the three oldest cemeteries in Vilnius, Lithuania. It covers about 38,000 square metres and has an estimated 14,000 burial sites. It was established in 1810 by the Bernardine monks of the Church of St. Francis of Assisi, just east of the city center in the Užupis district, and is situated on an embankment of the Vilnia river. Its development was a consequence of Tsarist authorities of the Russian Empire prohibiting burying the dead near churches. The residents of Vilnius moved the cemetery to what was then the outskirts of the city.

The Columbaria were built on the east and west sides of the cemetery. The cemetery was expanded in 1860. After the Second World War the cemetery was abandoned for the most part and began to deteriorate. It was closed in the 1970s and since then until recently it had remained almost unchanged. Many of the oldest graves had sunk into the ground and became covered in moss. The eastern columbarium had almost entirely disappeared. Restoration and reconstruction of its buildings and monuments, including the western columbarium, began in the late 1990s.

== Restoration work ==
Beginning in 2005, on the initiative of the Adam Mickiewicz Polish-Lithuanian foundation together with the Council for the Protection of Struggle and Martyrdom Sites (one of the main initiators of the project was Andrzej Przewoźnik, a Polish historian who died in the airplane crash in Smolensk in 2010), conservation work on the cemetery (known in Polish as Cmentarz Bernardyński na Zarzeczu) commenced with the aim of restoring the necropolis for 2010, the two hundredth anniversary of the founding. The restoration work was funded by private donors as well as through a joint effort by the Polish and Lithuanian governments. More than a hundred historic tombstones have been renovated, most of them those of Polish and Lithuanian participants of the January Uprising, Home Army soldiers and the past faculty of the Stefan Batory University. Further renovations are planned.

== Famous graves ==
Numerous famous scientists, painters and Vilnius University, intellectuals, professors and other renowned people are buried there including:

- Helena Dzierżyńska (1849–1896), Felix Dzerzhinsky's mother
- Stanisław Fleury (1861–1915), Polish-Lithuanian artist and photographer
- Stanisław Bonifacy Jundziłł (1761–1847), Polish-Lithuanian botanist and florist, professor of Vilnius University and head of the Botanical Garden
- Kazimieras Kairiūkštis (1886–1918), Lithuanian engineer
- Vytautas Kairiūkštis (1890–1961), Lithuanian painter
- Włodzimierz Mazurkiewicz – Polish pilot and engineer
- Franciszek Narwojsz (1742–1819) – Polish-Lithuanian mathematician and engineer
- Valdas Herkus Neimantas (1966–2005), the main designer of Užupis Republic
- Zachariasz Niemczewski (1766–1820) – Polish-Lithuanian professor of mathematics
- Antanas Ramonas (1946–1993), Lithuanian writer
- Stanisław Rosołowski (1797–1855), Polish writer and doctor
- Bolesław Rusiecki – Polish-Lithuanian painter
- Kanuty Rusiecki – Polish-Lithuanian painter
- Ludwik Sobolewski (1791–1830), Polish writer and historian, prefect of the Vilnius University Library
- Józef Szeliga-Bieliński (1848–1926), Polish physician and historian, the first honorary professor of Stefan Batory University

== See also ==
- Rasos Cemetery
- Antakalnis Cemetery
- List of cemeteries in Lithuania

== Photos ==
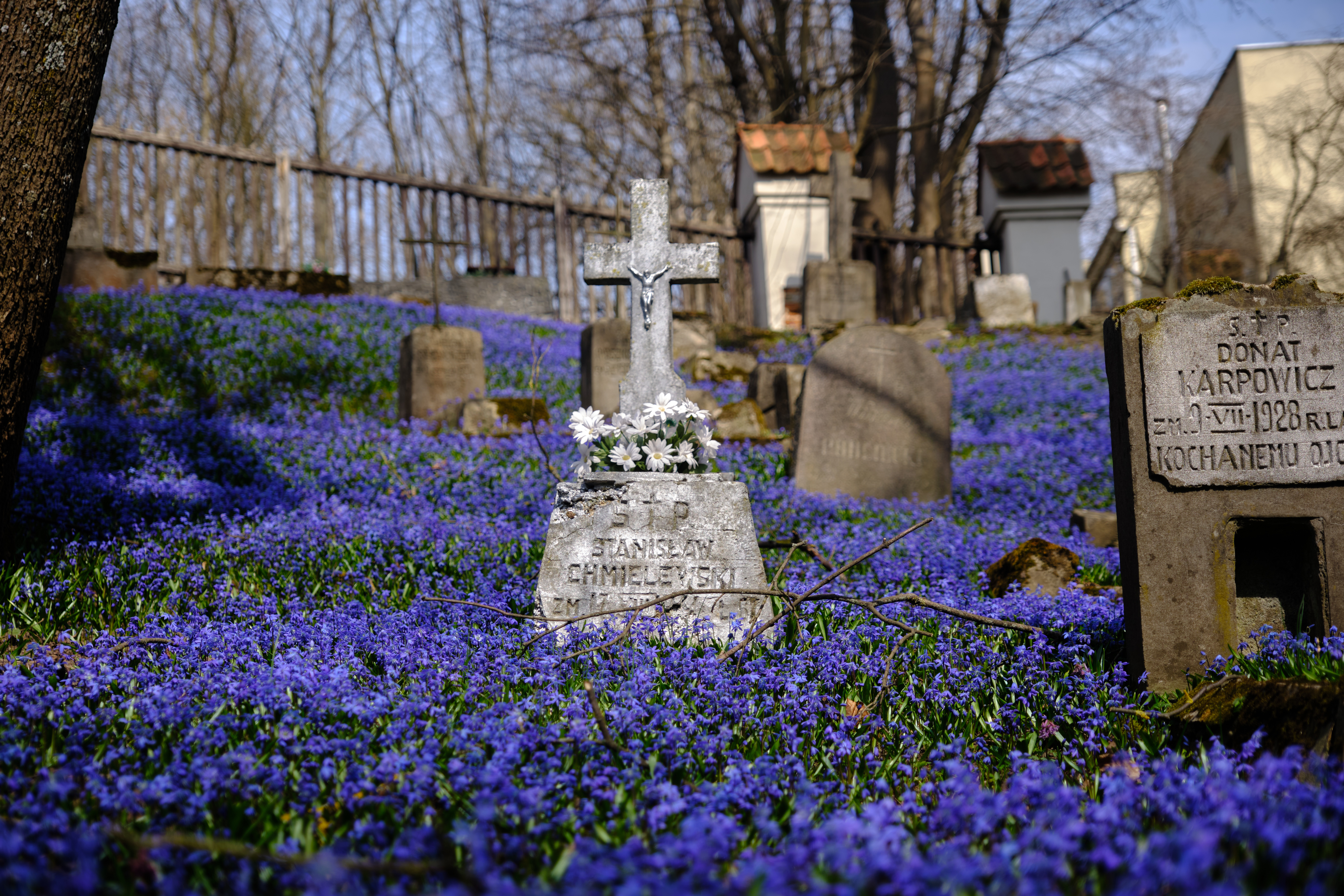

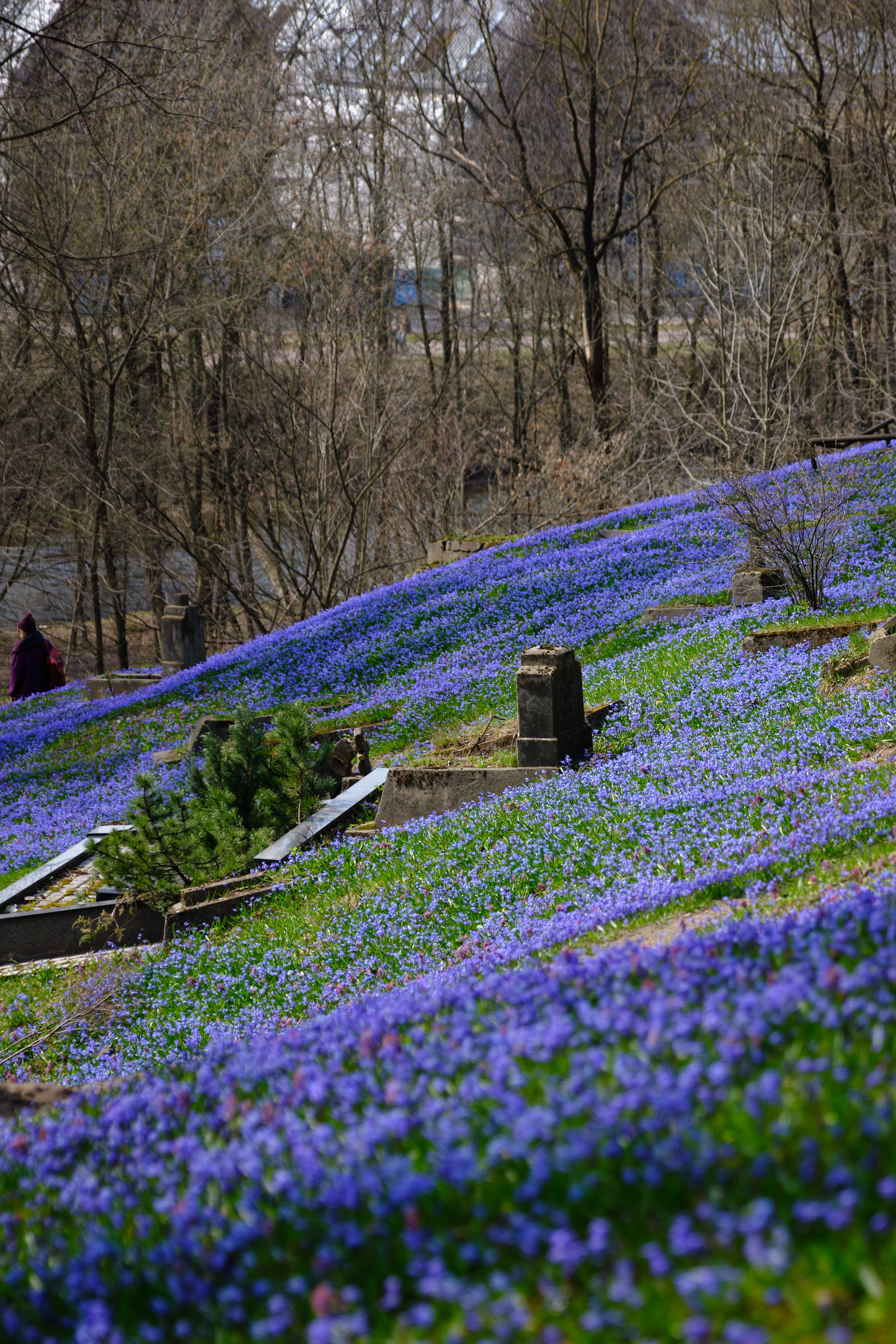

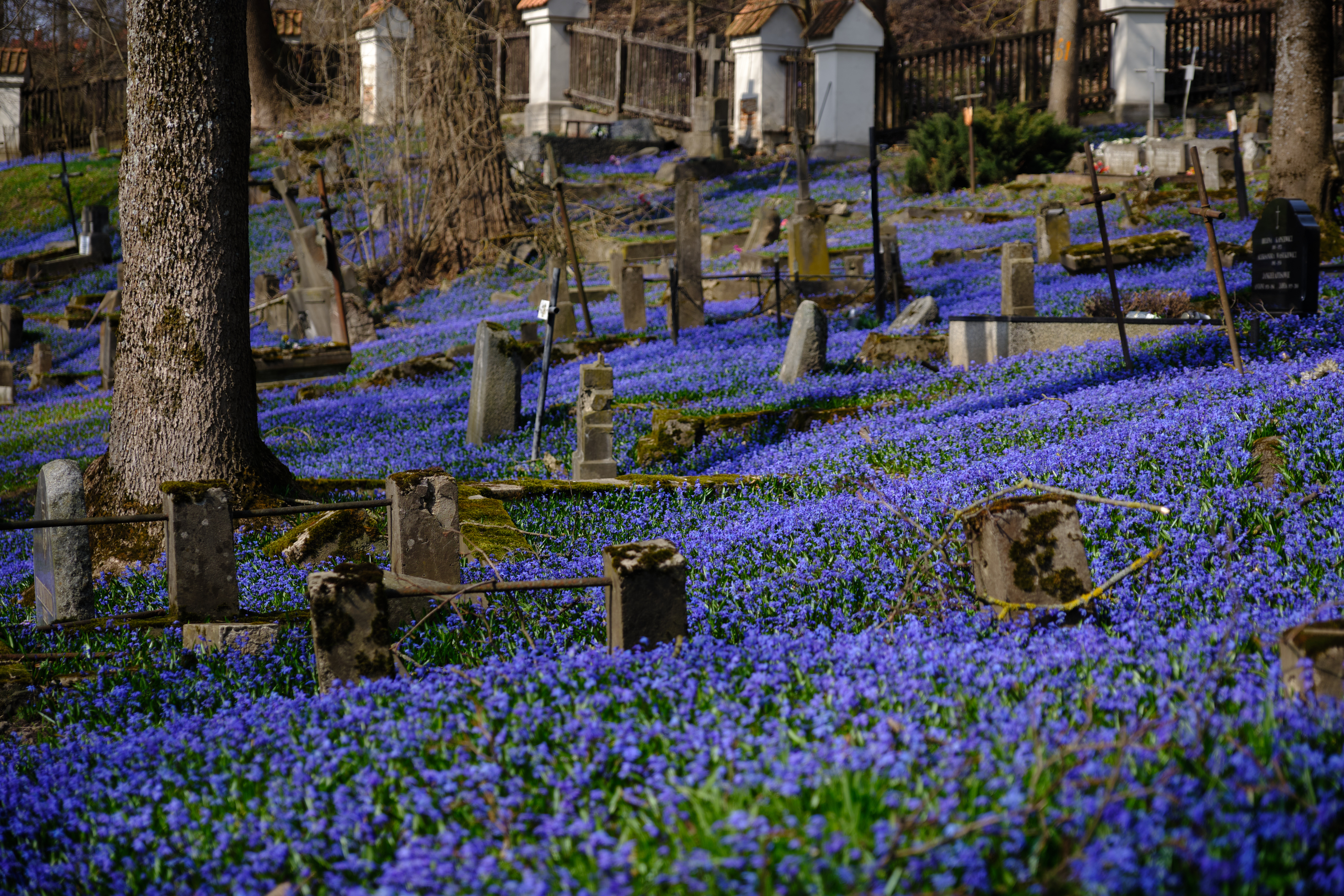

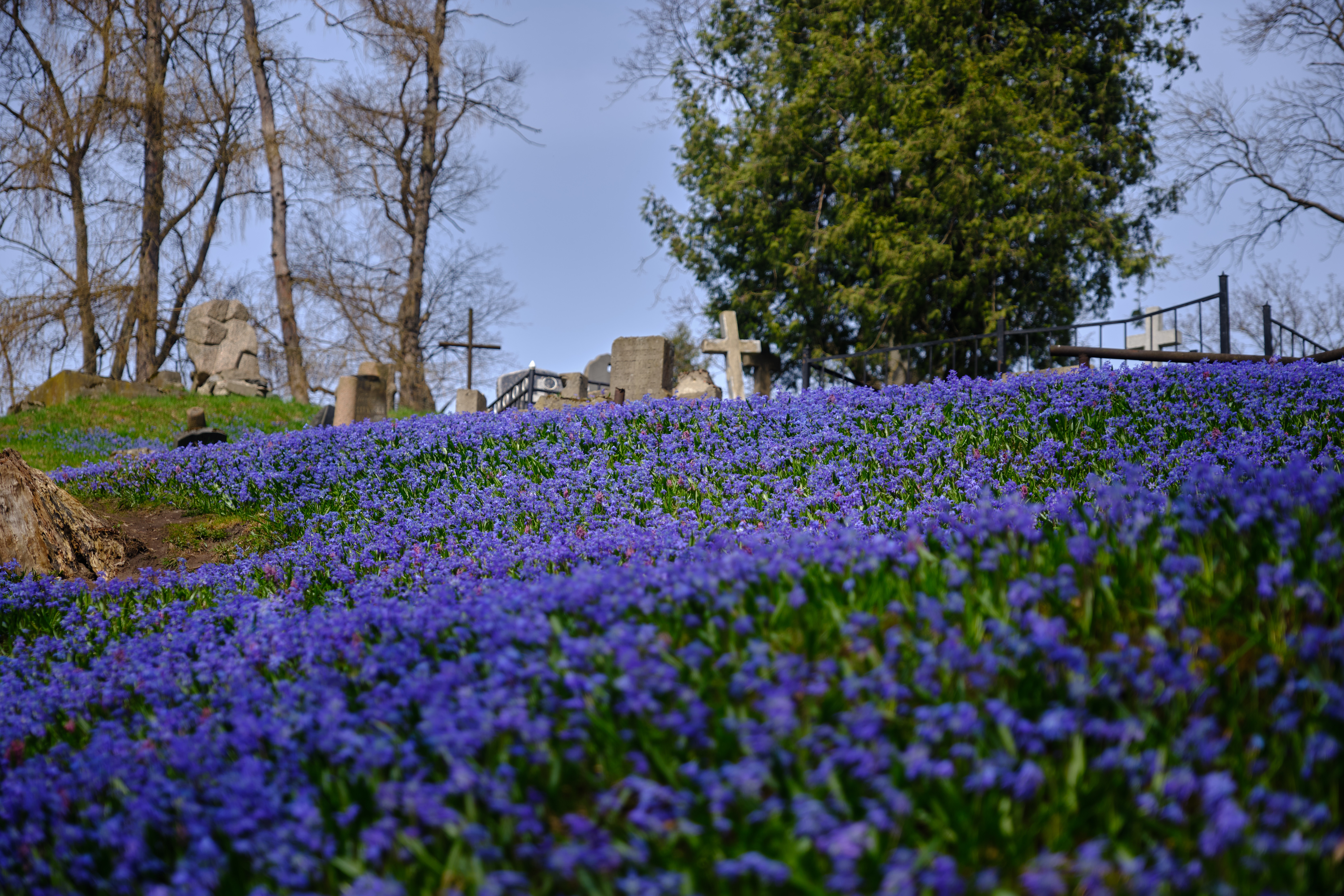
