= Beesfund =

Polish equity crowdfunding platform

- Company type: Joint-stock company
- Website type: Crowdfunding
- Available in: Polish; English
- Headquarters: Warsaw, Poland
- Area served: Poland
- CEO: Arkadiusz Regiec
- Key people: Witold Sosnowski (CTO); Michał Cudny (CFO); Łukasz Zgiep (COO)
- Industry: Capital market
- Services: Equity crowdfunding
- Subsidiaries: OdpalProjekt.pl; Taon Property
- Website: beesfund.com
- Commercial: Yes
- Registration: Required
- Users: ▲29,000 (2019)
- Launched: August 13, 2012; 14 years ago

Beesfund is a Polish equity crowdfunding platform based in Warsaw, Poland. Managed by its eponymous company founded in 2012 by entrepreneur Arkadiusz Regiec, it is one of the first crowdfunding platforms in Poland, and Central and Eastern Europe. As of May 2020, 74 public offerings (issuances) were carried out on the platform, for a total amount of PLN 47M ($11.1 million, equivalent to $13.81 million in 2025), collected by over 48,000 registered investors.

Beside its namesake platform, Beesfund also manages a sister flexible-model crowdfunding platform (estimated 2014). It's reportedly to launch another, real-estate crowdfunding platform, and start operations in Romania, and Slovakia.

== History ==
=== Origin of the platform ===
In 2012, Arkadiusz Regiec, a student of law and political science at the University of Warsaw, was looking for financial support to start a business with a friend, but none of their friends wanted to risk loans of PLN 10,000, but no more than 300. Thanks to subsequent small donations, Regiec was able to collect the necessary amount, which in turn inspired him to create a collection mechanism in an organized form. Regiec decided to situate a similar mechanism to Kickstarter in Polish legal reality.

In addition to Kickstarter's reward-based crowdfunding model, there are also two other models present on financial markets — the Peer-to-peer lending model, in which the entrepreneur borrows money for his project from a group of lenders, and the equity model, in which funds are raised by offerings of company shares. However, it is not possible to raise funds comparable with the traditional capital market through equity crowdfunding, therefore it cannot compete with the regular stock exchange market, nor alternative trading systems. Through equity crowdfunding, initial capital is provided by small contributions from many backers, thanks to which the company can raise funds for development in a short time.

Beesfund's aim is to fill the gap on the financial market, alongside mature companies selling shares on the Warsaw Stock Exchange, and smaller ones entering the NewConnect alternative market. By establishing one of the first equity crowdfunding platforms in Poland, it offered the opportunity to buy shares of companies by payers not limited to transferring support for the venture but becoming its co-owners. The launch of the platform was announced on May 31, 2012 during the first conference of the Polish Crowdfunding Society, including plans to extend to foreign markets.

=== The beginnings ===
Beesfund was launched on August 13, 2012, under the slogan "We Help to Implement Good Ideas". On the first day, first payments appeared in three of the four projects posted, and in the afternoon their sum exceeded the first thousand zlotys. The most funds, from seven backers, 1.4 percent of the target, were obtained by a project in which the community could invest in Beesfund itself, valued at PLN 1M (US$255,000).

During the first years of the platform, its founders evangelized the market, persuading to the formula of crowdfunding. Regiec compared crowdfunding with a bee swarm, where a single insect won't do much, but a full beehive can produce a jar of honey (hence the name of the platform). The platform's own issuance served as an example to prove the legality of public issues of shares offered without a prospectus or memorandum, in accordance with the guidelines of Poland's Financial Supervision Authority (KNF). Beesfund is presented as an incubator for the smallest companies that need money for development and want to gather experience on small issues, and the possibility of dispersing risk for investors with uncertain investments in unknown startups.

In October 2012, the platform gained the financial goal of its own campaign for PLN 50,000 thanks to 69 investors. In blocks of 10 shares for PLN 100 (US$25.50) each, 5,000 shares were sold, which was 5% of the company's total shares. Most payments did not exceed PLN 100. For all participation projects in the platform, the principle of not exceeding the financial goal has been introduced.

=== First sister platform ===
In July 2014, Beesfund launched another crowdfunding platform OdpalProjekt.pl (Firestart Up a Project). Inspired by Indiegogo, the first award-based, flexible-funding platform in Poland. Despite determining the financial goal, the project promoter receives all funds accumulated during a campaign and is obliged to implement the project. The OdpalProjekt.pl is addressed to investors interested in debut projects, specific, and one-off ventures — cultural events, as well as album, video game, and book releases. Money from online backers is obtained in two options, "Take What You Collect" (with a 6.9% commission), and "Everything Or Nothing" (with a 4.9% commission). Regardless of the support received, all the collected funds go to the project promoter, which doesn't release him from preparing reimbursable benefits as prizes.

=== Increasing interest ===
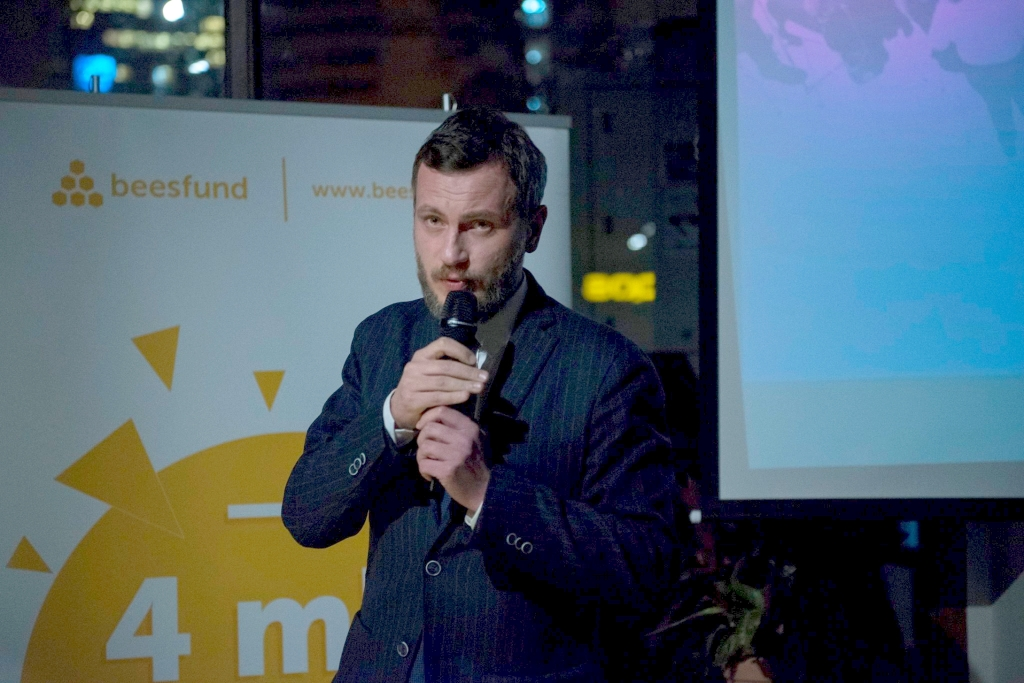
Arkadiusz Regiec, Beesfund CEO

By 2015, 5 successful open issues were carried out on the platform, in which over PLN 1.5M were obtained in total. In 2016, Beesfund carried out 6 offerings, in which a total of over PLN 1.7M (US$425,000) was obtained. The platform base then counts 1,049 active investors who bought at least one share. According to Regiec, the platform is used by both people associated with issuers, and professional investors, as well as HNWIs from Wprost magazine's List of the 100 Richest Poles.

In 2017, equity crowdfunding was increasingly popular in Poland. In the annual Polish Startups report of the Startup Poland Foundation, 11% of startups declared that they were looking for funding through crowdfunding (in 2016, it was 3%). Throughout the year, Beesfund carried out 11 offerings, with an average of 140 investors, from a total of 8,000 registered investors, of which a quarter have invested. Most of them actively follow the development of the company, some providing their advice, although the amounts invested do not exceed several hundred zlotys (under US$200).

Following further successful campaigns, Beesfund creators encouraged entrepreneurs: "Absolutely crucial is the full commitment of the project's creator in its promotion, spreading information, encouraging support, and sharing links to the project among friends of friends."

=== Developing the investors' network ===
In November 2017, Beesfund carried out its 20th offering — the startup company City Inspire sought to acquire PLN 400,000 (US$102,000). At that point, all emissions on the platform, were worth a total of PLN 18M (US$4.6M). All issuers remained on the market, and the first ones achieved their business goals. Increasingly joining the offerings are companies already backed by venture capital funds, to collect further financing from the community. One example is ACR Systems, with an initial PLN 1.5M (US$380,000) investment by the SpeedUp Venture Capital Group of Poznań.

In December 2017, Beesfund CEO estimated that the Polish equity crowdfunding market was worth approximately PLN 20M (US$5.1M), with the option of increasing to PLN 80M (US$20.4M), up to PLN 300M (US$76.5M), provided that the value limits for public securities issues were soon to be raised.

=== Further growth ===
In July 2018, Beesfund's database had 6,800 registered investors. Throughout 2018, Beesfund carried out issues of shares of 13 companies that collected a total of PLN 4.6M (US$1.1M). 16 projects were fully funded. By May 2019, the platform had already 21,300 registered users, and carried out over 40 issuances, which collected a total of over PLN 23M (US$5.8M). In August 2019, in 53 issues on the Beesfund platform, with the participation of 23,500 investors, a total of PLN 28M (US$7.1M) was collected.

Between January and June 2019 alone, Beesfund issuers carried out 16 offerings, for a total amount of PLN 14.3M (US$3.6M), in 18,252 payments, made by 14,998 active investors, including 16,913 new investors. In August 2019, the total amount of funds raised on Beesfund exceeded PLN 30M (US$7.6M). By the end of 2019, Beesfund will issue 40 offerings.

== Characteristics of the platform ==
Beesfund is one of the first crowdfunding platforms in Central and Eastern Europe, operating in the model of selling shares of joint-stock companies. Companies that issue shares on Beesfund are able to build an investor community around their ideas, and run campaigns to promote the offerings.

In open public equity-crowdfunding issuances, the legally available amount for Polish entities is currently €1M. The issuer is not obliged to issue an issue prospectus or investment memorandum, which is why Beesfund is dominated by companies with a ready business model that depends on the dispersion of capital and shareholders. Thanks to the investor community, the platform acquires capital, while the issuer must transform into a joint-stock company, or limited joint-stock company, which prepares the company for its entry onto the capital market, including NewConnect and the Warsaw Stock Exchange.

At the company's initial stage of development, it is difficult to estimate results. Therefore, an important factor in the selection of companies for the offering is their market potential, business plan, assessment of the international business potential, as well as the founders themselves, and their previous successes. Every successful issuance on Beesfund is the result of a careful assessment of the investor community, hence the unsuccessful offerings are likely to precede a company closure. In October 2018, of the five companies that did not raise funds on Beesfund, only one operated.

=== The course of offerings ===
To collect the amount set by a company, its owners must advertise their idea to convince the investor community. The offering alone acts as a free verification of business plans. Beesfund creators want its offerings to be associated with an emotional charge — so far, the platform issued shares of sports clubs, alcohol manufacturers, and video game producers. In addition to issuing shares, Beesfund also provides tax and legal advice for issuers, transforms legal form of their businesses.

The fact of interest by several dozen or several hundred shareholders helps in obtaining a bank loan for development and may affect the involvement of potential strategic investors. It may also be a way of an incentive program for employees. In turn, the person purchasing the company's shares or bonds gains the right to dividend or the sale of shares (confirmed by a paper certificate). Currently, small transactions can only take place between shareholders because Beesfund issuers do not run public companies. Unless the majority of the issuer's shares were taken up by a large investor and introduced to the public market. Beesfund users can also make payments using bitcoins. Failure to meet the financial goal is not related to the failure of the project (the "you-take-what-you-collect" model).

However, not all crowdfunding equity issues of companies end with the collection of all planned capital. The crucial cause may be the lack of human resources for conducting an effective campaign, too few people convinced to invest, or the lack of an idea for effective convincing investors.

=== The shareholders' community ===
In addition to company financing, the value of equity crowdfunding is the community itself, micro investors ready to entrust their money to a group of people with a business idea. Investors hope for a return on investment in the future, the first and potentially subsequent ones, and as a result, an interest in the company developing dynamically and consistently. A properly managed community with such motivation is substantive support for the board, a source of valuable contacts, and a group of ambassadors who can help solve problems of the organization.

Thanks to the shareholder community, business originators gain validation of the consumer group, which is also the company's first valuation. A reference point in conversations with a business angel or venture capital fund. It is also a chance for publicity and access to a group of advisers — lawyers, professional investors, entrepreneurs, and IT specialists. Often, companies also prepare a package of additional rewards — product packages, or membership cards.

== Notable campaigns ==
=== Wisła Kraków ===
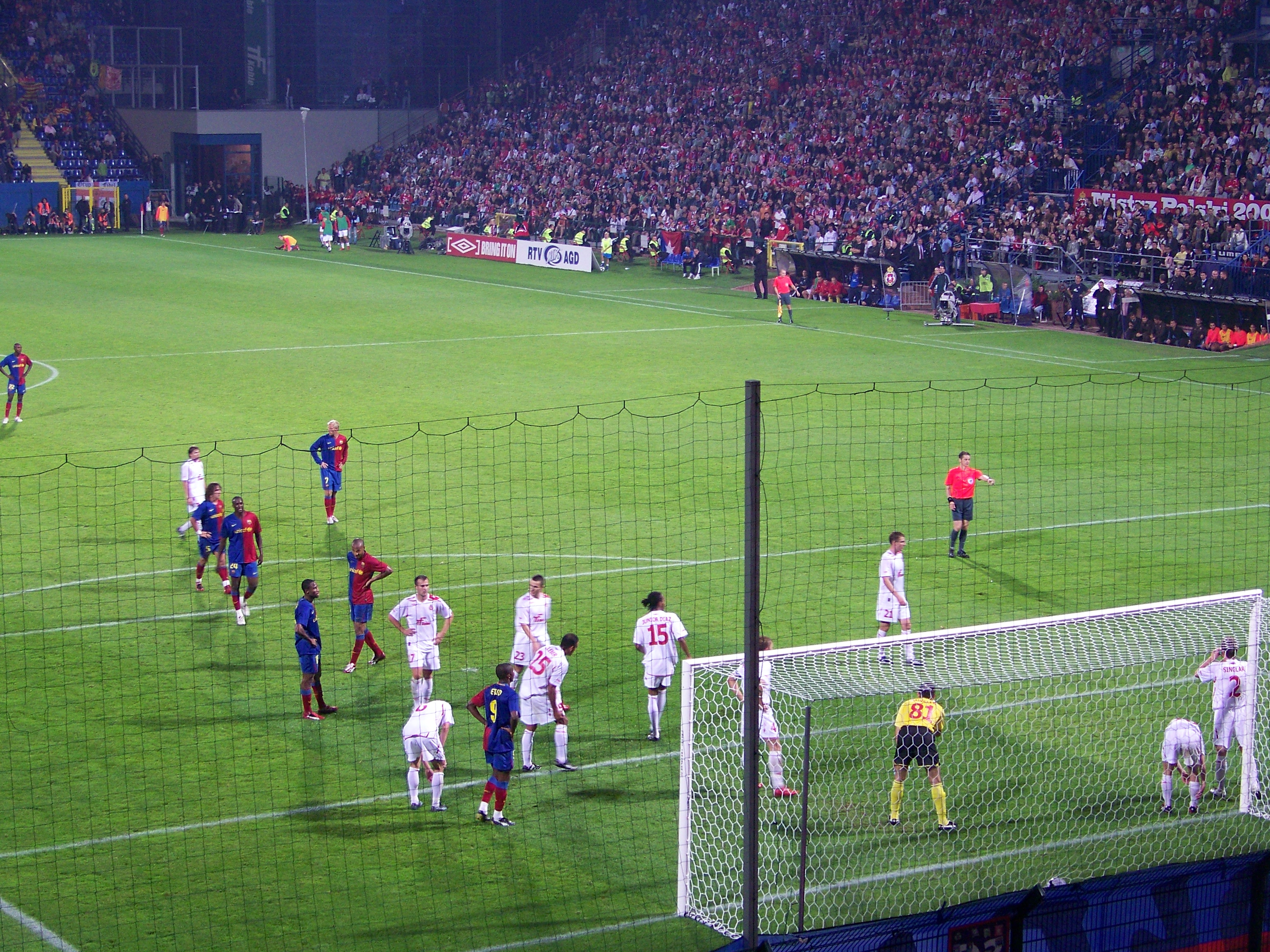
Wisła Kraków playing with FC Barcelona, August 2008

At the beginning of January 2019, Beesfund CEO Arkadiusz Regiec informed about the analysis of the possibility of issuing shares in the football company Wisła Kraków, which needed PLN 80M to pay its debt. On January 17, Beesfund signed an agreement with Wisła Kraków, and then on February 5, within 24 hours, 9,129 investors gathered 40,000 shares (5,115 percent) on one platform, worth PLN 4M (US$1M). In the first initiative of this type in Poland, the capital of the football company was increased, which even achieved a slight financial profit thanks to the issue of shares, loans, drop-offs, transfers, and ticket sales for a total of PLN14.2M (US$3.6M).

The club representatives emphasized the symbolic value of the club's shares, that represent the unifying of the Wisła community. This is the first such initiative in Poland. Each person who buys the shares will receive a special personal document. Additional benefits encouraged the purchase of shares: a unique headband and poster. For larger amounts, the Wisła jersey with signatures of the players, and VIP Gold tickets which included a dinner with members of the board and team council. After the success of the offering for Wisła Kraków, more than 20 other Polish and foreign sports clubs, not exclusively football, came forward to Beesfund to sign similar contracts.

=== Inne Beczki ===
In March 2016, the craft brewery Inne Beczki started the campaign. The founders wanted to discount the success of their small beer bar Spotkanie ze Szpiegiem (Meeting with the Spy), which managed to attract the community, and planned to invest PLN 400,000 (US$101,500) to create a brewery. Over 700 investors collected the entire amount in 11 days. The price of one share was PLN 40 (US$10.15). The company announced a dividend in the coming years.

Revenues from the sale of shares allowed to achieve the objectives of production, distribution, and branding, and high consumer involvement meant that the brewery is able to grow organically and predictably. Its shareholders wanting to increase their potential profit work to increase the value of the company, regularly buying its beer in stores and ordering it on the premises. The Beesfund offering prompted a business angel to invest in a company, that in July 2018, at the cost of PLN 14M (US$3.5M), launched their own brewery Browar Błonie.

=== InPay ===
The first company that managed to raise funds on Beesfund for the development of its system and expansion in Poland and in Europe was InPay, the first provider of bitcoin payment solutions in Central Europe. After the approval of the Polish Financial Supervision Authority, in November 2014, a week ahead of schedule, 181 investors from around the world bought 5% of the company's shares for PLN 200,000 (US$51,000). In the offering of registered shares of InPay on Beesfund, bitcoin payments were enabled for the first time in the world, which allowed for a quick purchase of registered shares, and reduction of transaction costs.

=== Migam ===
In August 2012, one of the first projects on Beesfund was an offering for the publication of a textbook for sign language learning. The authors run the Migam company, which facilitates communication between people who use sign language, and the people who can hear. In May 2014, Beesfund launched an offering campaign. And although at the halfway point, Migam accumulated just over 4 percent of the expected amount, strategic investors came forward, and in April 2017, a Beesfund reissue took place.

== Largest successfully completed projects ==
Most successful offerings, as of May 2020.

#	Collected amount (PLN)	Company name	Category	% offered	Stock price (PLN)	Stock amount	Investors	Issue success threshold (PLN)	Closing date
1	4,202,820 (US$995,362.81 in 2023 (equivalent to $1,051,784.1 in 2025))	Wolf and Oak Distillery	Distillery	23,729%	135.00 (US$31.97 in 2023 (equivalent to $33.78 in 2025))	31,111	1482	149,985 (US$35,521.27 in 2023 (equivalent to $37,534.76 in 2025))	April 22, 2020
2	4,000,000 ($1,035,457 (equivalent to $1,094,150.99 in 2025))	Wisła Kraków	Football team	5,115%	100.00 ($25.89 (equivalent to $27.36 in 2025))	40,000	9,129	100.00 ($25.89 (equivalent to $27.36 in 2025))	March 6, 2019
3	3,877,275.83 ($1,003,688 (equivalent to $1,104,239.41 in 2025))	Browar Jastrzębie	Brewery	35.15%	0.23 ($0.060 (equivalent to $0.06 in 2025))	17,400,000	4,345	flexible	January 22, 2019
4	2,538,924.50 ($657,237 (equivalent to $694,491.92 in 2025))	Mazurska Manufaktura Alkoholi	Alcohol manufacture	12.5%	29.75 ($7.70 (equivalent to $8.14 in 2025))	142,857	1,010	100,019 ($25,891 (equivalent to $27,358.61 in 2025))	July 1, 2019
5	1,687,929.60 ($399,755.96 (equivalent to $422,415.78 in 2025))	Browar Brokreacja	Brewery	20%	33.60 ($7.96 (equivalent to $8.41 in 2025))	125,000	1,135	100,800 ($23,872.68 (equivalent to $25,225.88 in 2025))	August 24, 2019
6	1,396,337 ($361,462 (equivalent to $381,951.16 in 2025))	Ogen	Genetic research	17%	41.00 ($10.61 (equivalent to $11.21 in 2025))	102,410	592	100,040 ($25,897 (equivalent to $27,364.95 in 2025))	April 29, 2019
7	1,273,980 ($329,788 (equivalent to $348,481.75 in 2025))	Browar Brodacz	Brewery	40%	60.00 ($15.53 (equivalent to $16.41 in 2025))	66,667	1,104	flexible	February 26, 2019
8	1,252,700 ($324,279 (equivalent to $342,660.48 in 2025))	Wealthon Fund	Financial services	20%	20.00 ($5.18 (equivalent to $5.47 in 2025))	100,000	264	200,000 ($51,770 (equivalent to $54,704.54 in 2025))	April 12, 2019
9	1,224,267.60 ($289,945.90 (equivalent to $306,381.23 in 2025))	Runmageddon	Obstacle racing	2.5%	0.40 ($0.095 (equivalent to $0.1 in 2025))	5,198,860	1,281	200,000 ($47,366.43 (equivalent to $50,051.36 in 2025))	September 11, 2019
10	848,112 ($200,860.17 (equivalent to $212,245.76 in 2025))	Studio Filmowe Panika	Film studio	15%	0.20 ($0.047 (equivalent to $0.05 in 2025))	10,024,412	949	150,000 ($35,524.82 (equivalent to $37,538.51 in 2025))	October 9, 2019

== The accelerator ==
On June 8, 2017, Beesfund and the Warsaw Stock Exchange initiated the startup accelerator named Akcelerator GPW, a joint initiative to support the building of business relationships between startups and companies listed on the WSE (especially management boards and supervisory boards), investors, venture capital funds, and other accelerators. On October 1, 2017, WSE and Beesfund announced 100 startups and innovative companies for the first stage of the Accelerator, starting an acceleration platform for startups, social investors from Central and Eastern Europe, state administration, and other participants of the capital market.

However, in February 2018 Regiec referred to rapid changes within the WSE: ″President Maciejewski saw a serious opportunity in crowdfunding for the Stock Exchange to have a new impulse, Then president Tamborski noticed crowdfunding, but he thought it was not the time for roses when OFE forests are burning. And while president Grzywiński then signed an agreement with me, the current president Dietl has also been mentioning crowdfunding in the context of GPW foundation activities." In October 2018, Regiec confirmed that ultimately the GPW Accelerator had not started. In January 2019, Beesfund announced that Mateusz Tulecki, the creator of the InternetBeta conference, undertook the building of the accelerator.

== TokenBridge ==
In July 2017, Beesfund launched a spin-off TokenBridge dedicated to blockchain technology, to create a mechanism for tokenizing shares, bonds, exchange-traded funds and conducting initial coin offerings. The exchange of global stocks with cryptocurrencies would use ERC-20 blockchain tokens representing formal stocks of companies that trade on stock exchanges. TokenBridge is to allow to collect these shares from the stock market, and release paired tokens free for anyone to trade. In the process of tokenization (attaching tokens to securities), TokenBridge would take a physical possession of shares, create a register of audited token-backed securities, and release tokens onto the blockchain.

In August 2017, the company released its ICO, tokenized first assets, and has worked with first companies with adequate trade volume and interest from investors. The company has been considering a dedicated token to purchase services, and a yearly fee for token maintenance. In November 2018, TokenBridge joined the acceleration program of the PKO Bank Polski, as part of the innovation development platform under the name Let's Fintech with PKO Bank Polski.

Since May 2019, Beesfund has been working on algorithms that support the creation of digital smart contracts and the process of exchanging tokens with cryptocurrencies to issue share tokens. For analyzing financial results of companies, and increasing the efficiency of communication with shareholders, Beesfund will implement a prediction tool based on machine learning.

== Plans made public ==
Beesfund wants not only startups but also mature companies to benefit from crowdfunding in Poland. The platform is looking for medium-sized companies that are characterized by dynamic growth, including family businesses that are going through a moment of succession. Sports clubs and local governments are also looking for additional funds. Beesfund is in talks with several municipalities to issue city or municipal bonds, with state guarantees."

=== International expansion ===
Beesfund is to start operations in Romania, in January 2020, and Slovakia. The company's expansion process is managed by former WSE president and NewConnect founder Ludwik Sobolewski. The plans are for Beesfund to become the largest platform of the Intermarium region, helping startups from Lithuania, Latvia, Estonia, Bulgaria, Hungary, Belarus, Ukraine, countries of former Yugoslavia, and Georgia. Beesfund wants to compete with Europe's largest equity market in the United Kingdom, where 21 percent of issues was carried out in 2016 by two equity crowdfunding platforms, Crowdcube and Seedrs.

=== Taon Property ===
In June 2019, Beesfund created a subsidiary Taon Property, to manage another sister crowdfunding platform, in real estate. The platform is to allow the collection of money for investments, with contributions from PLN 50 from individual investors, in office and utility spaces.

=== Brokerage house, alternative trading system ===
Beesfund plans to apply for a license to run a brokerage office that will open the way to issues of PLN 20-30 million. And as a supplement to the NewConnect market, the company is to apply for a regulated alternative trading system, a multilateral trading facility, with the option of trading shares in limited liability companies. The MTF based on a blockchain-distributed data register is to create a pan-European stock exchange for innovative companies from across the continent. In order to implement the plans, Beesfund will issue its own shares to raise capital.

== Recognition ==
In June 2018, BeesFund was awarded in the annual ballot Aulery, in which technology industry practitioners distinguish market leaders, and identify the best Polish companies with global potential.
