= Karol Perthées =

Cartographer

- Born: January 14, 1740; Dresden
- Died: 1815
- Burial place: Protestant Cemetery, Vilnius
- Occupation: cartographer

Karol Perthées or Karol Herman de Perthées (14 January 1740 – 21 November 1815 / 2 December 1815) was a Polish-Lithuanian army engineer who served as royal cartographer under the patronage of Stanisław August Poniatowski. He worked on maps of the region, collected insects, and lectured on cartography for the Russian army in Vilnius. His most famous map, Polonia secundum legitimas proiectionis stereographicae regulas, was destroyed in 1944 by a fire but reconstructions exist.

== Life and work ==
Perthées was born in Dresden in a family of French Huguenots, the illegitimate son of Herman Karl von Keyserling. Although he was given the name Herman as well as Karol, he used only Karol. He studied at a military school in Berlin and trained in military engineering. In 1764 he was appointed court geographer and map-maker to Stanisław August Poniatowski, colonel of the Polish royal army. In 1798 he lectured on cartography for the Russian army in Vilnius. He produced a series of 1: 225,000 scale maps of the provinces of the former Polish–Lithuanian Commonwealth, with five of them published in Paris, along with a hydrographic map of Poland (Carte hydrographique de Pologne) in 1809.

From 1810 his eyesight deteriorated and in 1812 he moved to Mazuryszki near Vilnius. Apart from cartography, he collected insects and although much of it is destroyed, some illustrated descriptions survived. His collections included 2600 species and were acquired after his death by Vilnius University in 1823 but it was destroyed in 1943 during World War II.

Perthées married Józefa daughter of Italian painter Bernardo Bellotto and after her death in 1789, he married her sister Teresa in 1792. He was ennobled in 1768 and was buried in Vilnius (in the city's Protestant Cemetery) but the tomb no longer survives.
