= Łukasz Zgiep =

Polish entrepreneur, investor, and adviser

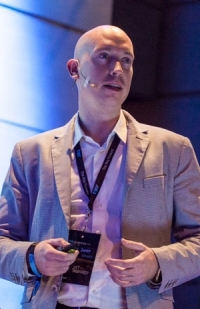
- Born: July 9, 1988 (age 37)
- Education: Economics
- Alma mater: Warsaw University of Life Sciences
- Occupation: Entrepreneur
- Employer: Beesfund
- Title: Chief Operating Officer
- Website: zgiep.com

Łukasz Sebastian Zgiep (Polish pronunciation: [ˈwukaʂ sɛˈbastjan ˈzɡʲɛp]; born July 9, 1988) is a Polish entrepreneur and consultant of the Blockchain-based business models. He is the chief operating officer of the equity crowdfunding platform Beesfund. Doctor of economics at the Warsaw University of Life Sciences (SGGW).

== Career ==
Zgiep has been an innovation management consultant, improving companies' efficiency of their business processes. He co-authored a report Economics of Cooperation in Poland 2016, and the annual summary The Polish Collaborative Economy Honeycomb, a matrix of companies that use innovative business models. He has been teaching on cooperation economy, business innovation, and crowdfunding.

Since 2018, Zgiep has been the Chief Operating Officer of the Polish equity crowdfunding platform Beesfund. He is a member of the Blockchain and New Technologies Chamber of Commerce, and the Blockchain and New Technologies Chamber of Commerce. He has been mentoring startups in acceleration programs around Poland, and consulting companies on the Blockchain-based sharing economy business models.

== Recognition ==
In January 2017, Zgiep won a Polish Chamber of Commerce's competition “Digital Poland 2020+”, for the essay Collaborative Economy as an Opportunity for the Polish Economy During the Fourth Industrial Revolution.

== Publications ==
- Zgiep, Łukasz (2014). "Sharing economy jako ekonomia przyszłości". Myśl Ekonomiczna i Polityczna. 4 (47). Warszawa: Szkoła Główna Gospodarstwa Wiejskiego: 193–205. ISSN 2081-5913.
- Zgiep, Łukasz (2017). Uwarunkowania rozwoju sektora gospodarki funkcjonującego według modelu ekonomii współpracy.
- Oksanowicz, Paweł (October 22, 2018). Biała Księga Blockchain (1 ed.). Warszawa: Wydawnictwo Naukowe PWN.
- Kowalska, Iwona; Zgiep Łukasz (2013). The region's competitiveness in the labor market by using territorial marketing and social media (PDF). Warsaw University of Life Sciences Press. ISBN 978-83-7583-494-9.
- Roman, Michał; Świetlińska, Monika; Zgiep, Łukasz (2011). "Promotion and Distribution of Agrotourism Services in Podlaskie Province" (PDF). Warszawa: Szkoła Główna Gospodarstwa Wiejskiego.
- Rok, Bolesław; Sokołowski, Dawid; Starzyński, Sebastian; Zgiep, Łukasz (2016). Ekonomia współpracy w Polsce 2016. ISBN 978-83-945933-0-8.
- Zgiep, Łukasz (2012). "Marketing Management in agricultural enterprises on the example of Polish agricultural producer groups". Наукові праці Полтавської державної аграрної академії. 2 (1).
