= Stebėkiai =

- Village
- Location of Stebėkiai
- Coordinates: 55°28′55″N 24°25′05″E
- Country: Lithuania
- County: Panevėžys County
- Municipality: Panevėžys District Municipality
- Eldership: Vadokliai Eldership

Population (2011)
  - Total: 0
- Time zone: UTC+2 (EET)
  - Summer (DST): UTC+3 (EEST)

Stebėkiai (Polish: Stebiaki I) is a village in Panevėžys District Municipality, Lithuania. According to the 2011 census, it had no residents. It is located 4 kilometres (2.5 mi) from Vadokliai town.

Prominent Polish-Lithuanian painter Kanuty Rusiecki was born here.
