= List of cemeteries in Lithuania =

This is a list of cemeteries in Lithuania.

== Vilnius ==
- Antakalnis Cemetery
- Bernardine Cemetery
- Evangelical Cemetery
- Jewish cemeteries
- Rasos Cemetery

== Kaunas ==
- Jewish cemeteries
- Petrašiūnai Cemetery
