= Jewish cemeteries of Kaunas =

Cemeteries in Lithuania

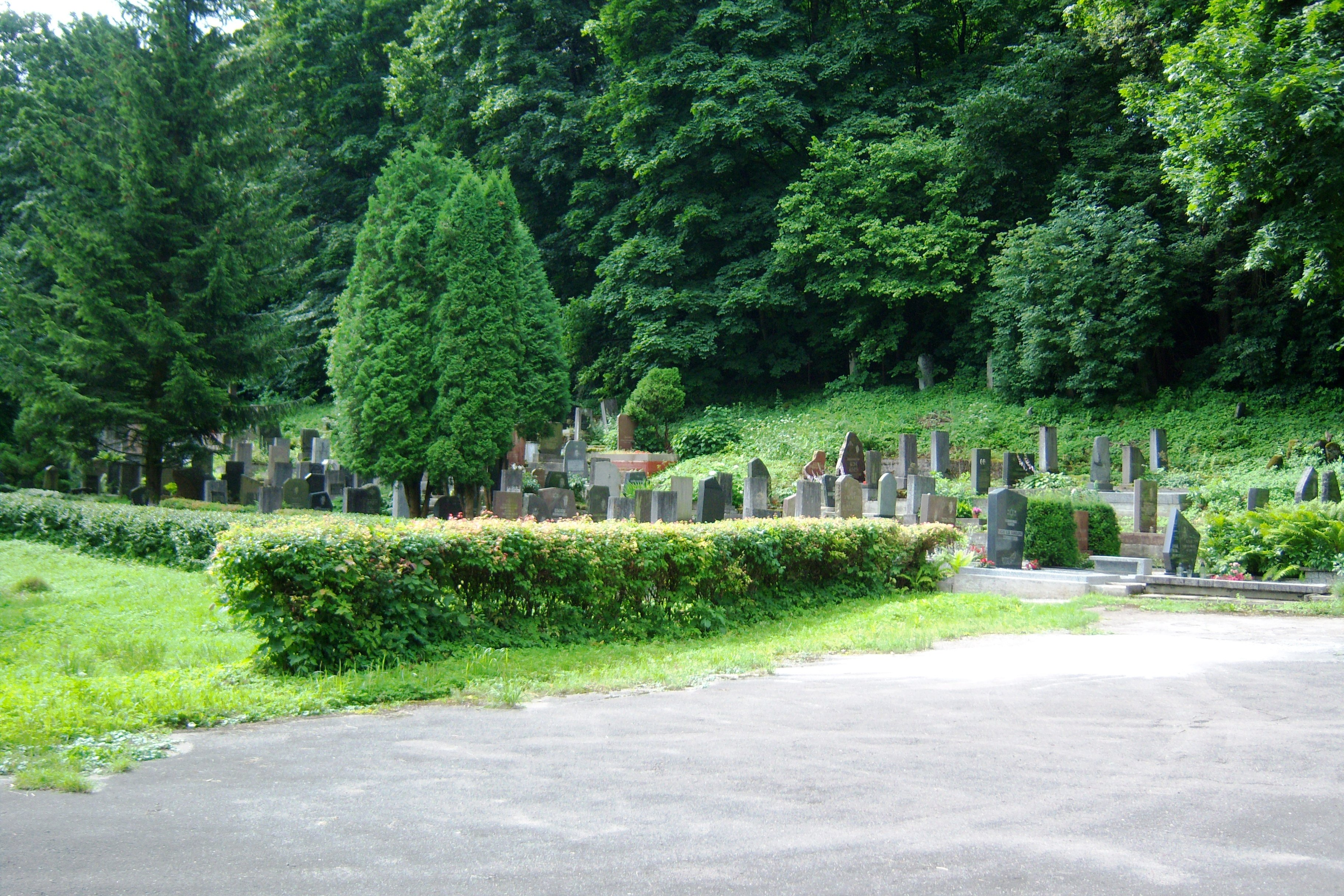
Aleksotas Jewish cemetery

The Jewish cemeteries of Kaunas are the four Jewish cemeteries of the Lithuanian Jews living in Kaunas, known to them as Kovne, Lithuania. Jewish people started settling in Kaunas in the second half of the 17th century. They were not allowed to live in the city, so most of them stayed in the Vilijampolė settlement on the opposite than Kaunas Castle right bank of the Neris River, near its confluence with the Nemunas River. Since the second half of the 19th century, Kaunas became a major center of Jewish cultural and economic activity in Lithuania.

The oldest Jewish cemetery in Vilijampolė was destroyed by the Soviet authorities after World War II.

The second and the largest Jewish cemetery is situated in the residential Žaliakalnis elderate, near the Ąžuolynas park. Among others, the Rabbi of Kovno and the head of Kovno Kollel Yitzchak Elchanan Spektor was buried in the Žaliakalnis Jewish cemetery. The cemetery is currently in a neglected state.

The third cemetery is located in the Panemunė elderate on the left bank of the Nemunas River. Only 3 gravestones are visible in this cemetery.

The fourth and still active Jewish cemetery is located in Aleksotas elderate near the Nemunas River.

== See also ==
- List of cemeteries in Lithuania
