= Antakalnis Cemetery =

Cemetery in Vilnius, Lithuania

Coordinates: 54.698°N 25.321°E

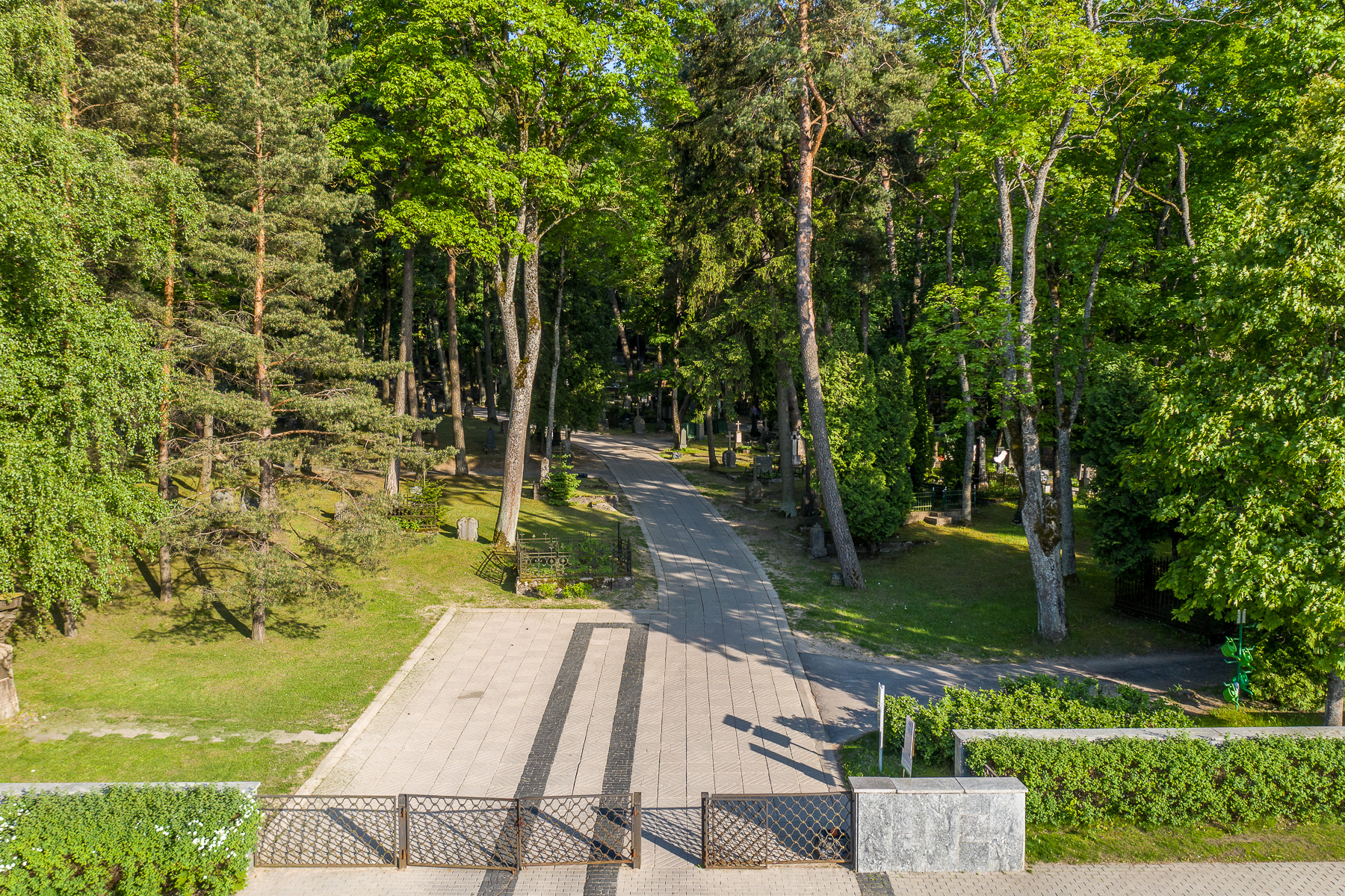
Entrance to the cemetery.

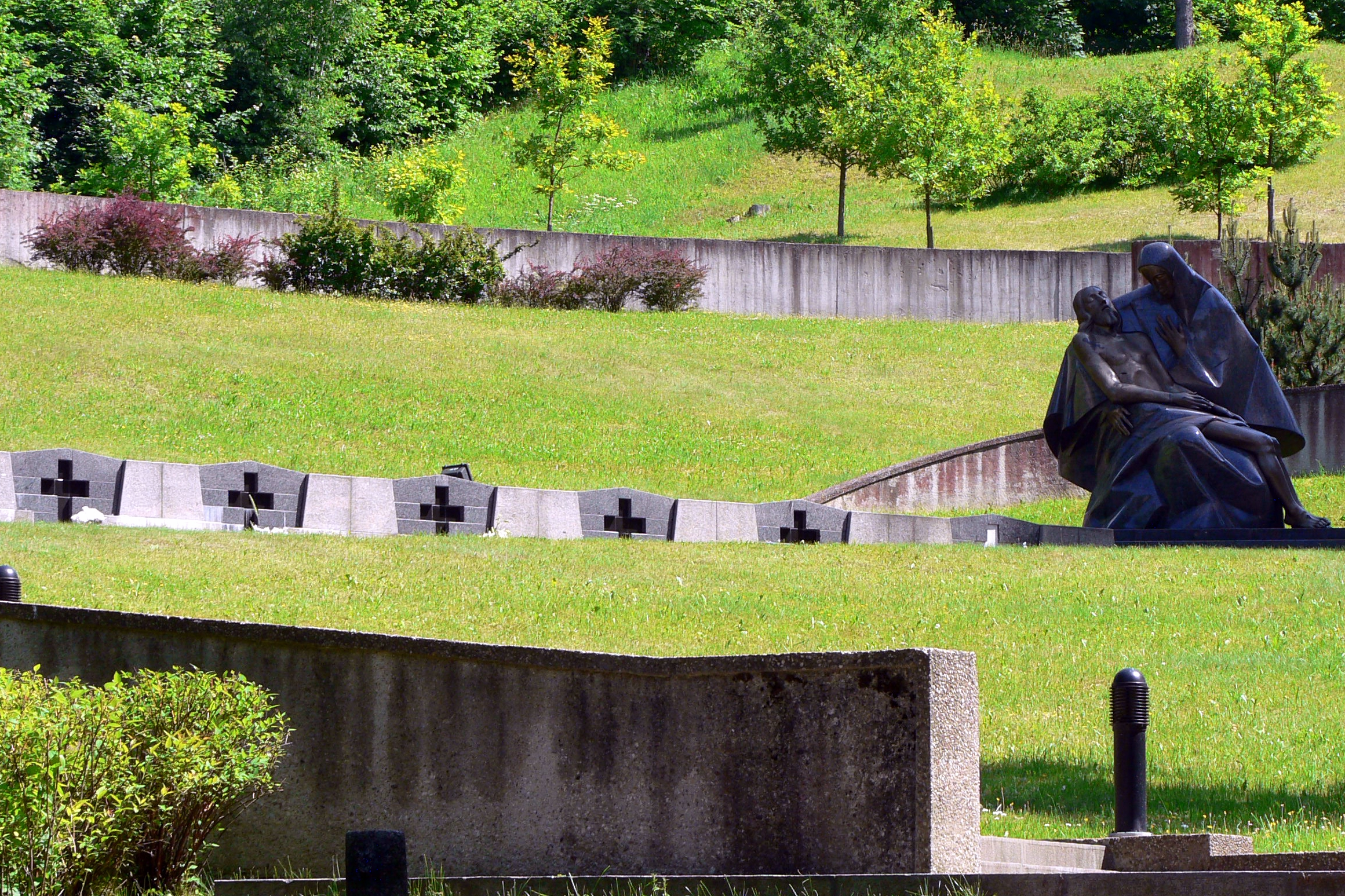
Memorial to the victims of the January Events.

Antakalnis Cemetery (Lithuanian: Antakalnio kapinės, Polish: Cmentarz na Antokolu, Belarusian: Антокальскія могілкі), sometimes referred as Antakalnis Military Cemetery, is an active cemetery in the Antakalnis district of Vilnius, Lithuania. It was established in 1809.

== Soldier burials ==
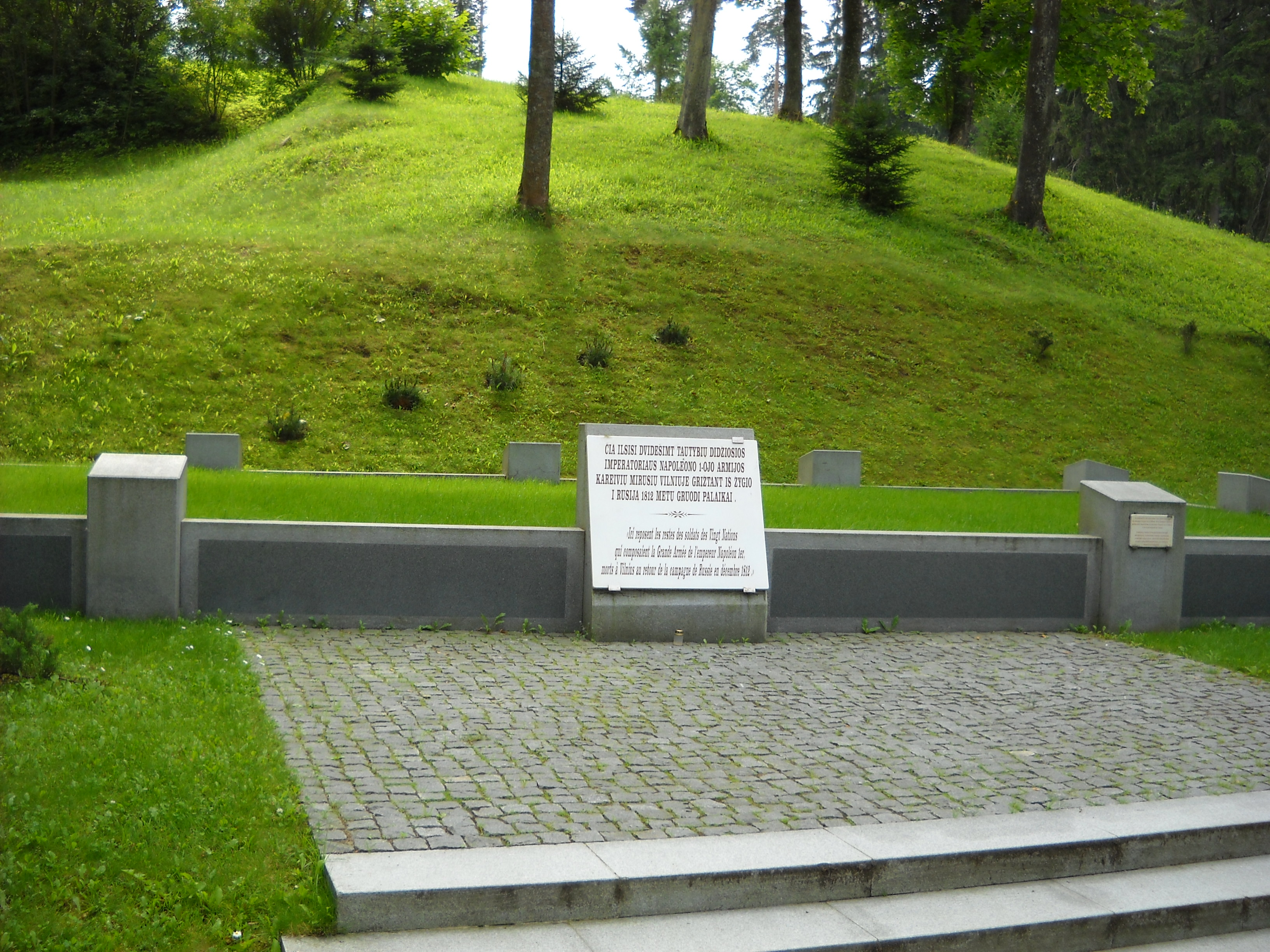
Monument for the Napoleon soldiers.

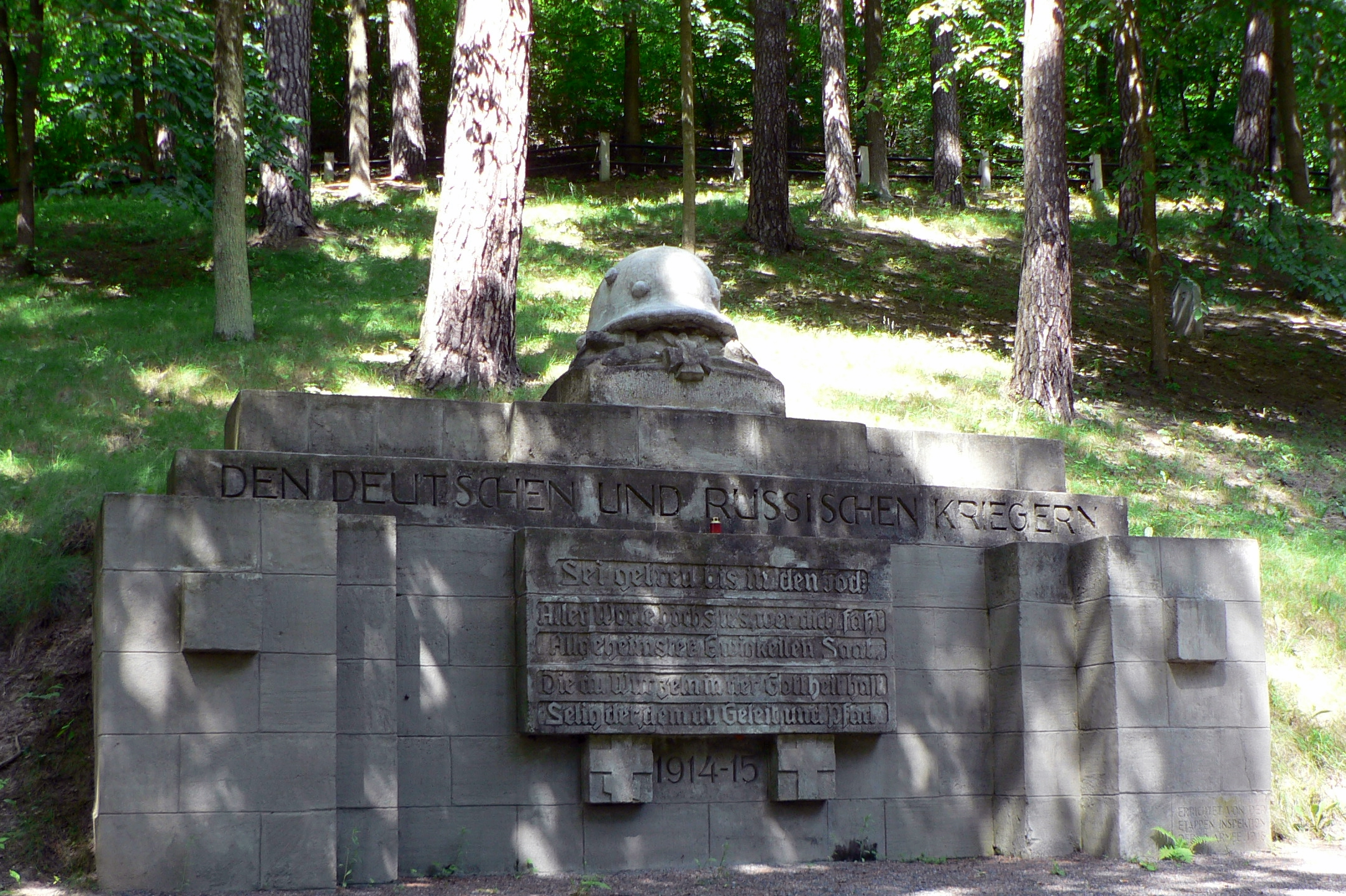
Monument for German and Russian soldiers fallen in World War I.

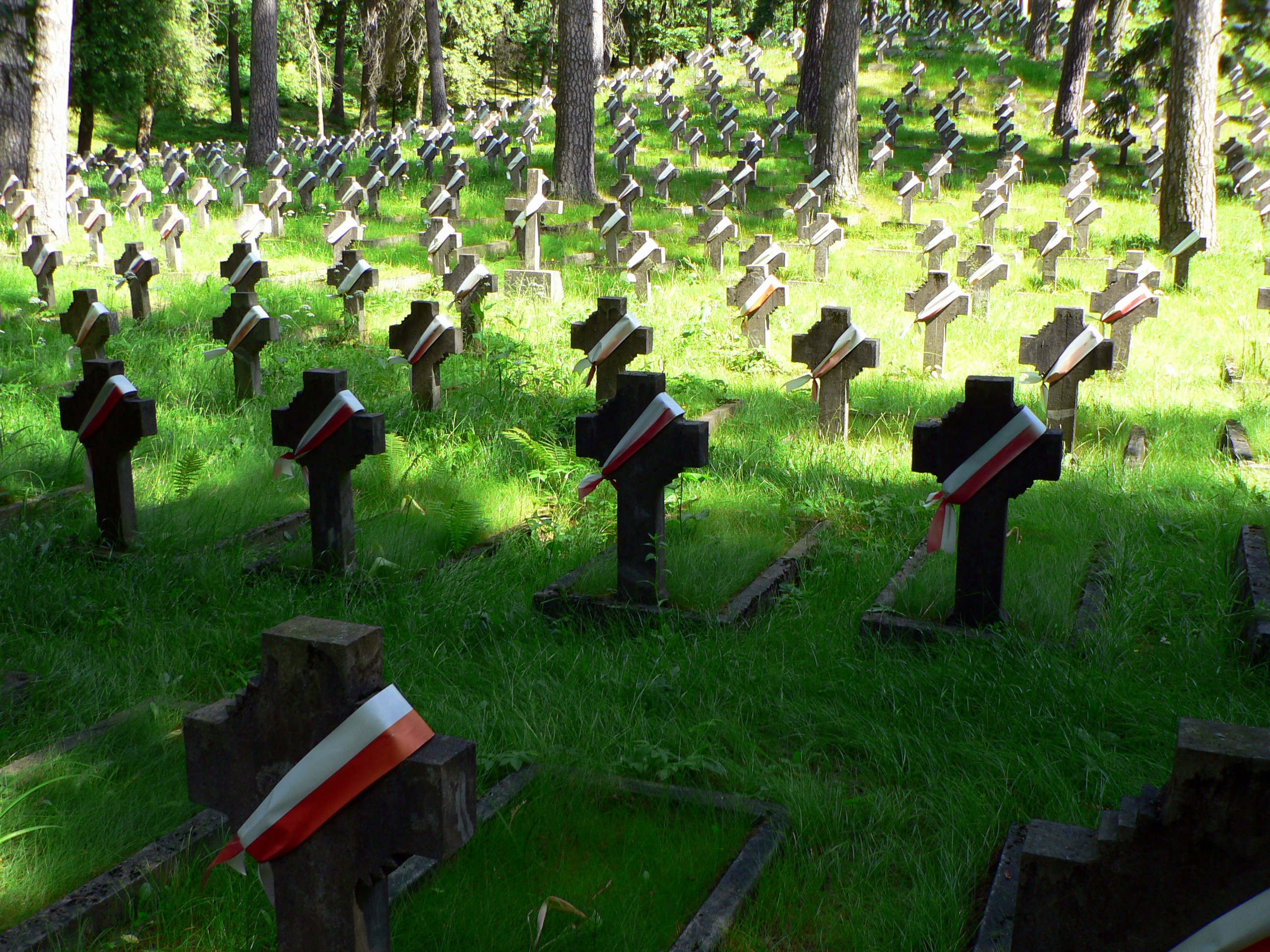
Graves of Polish soldiers.

12 of the 14 victims of the Soviet attacks during the January Events of 1991 as well as the Medininkai Massacre are buried here. Other graves include those of Polish soldiers who perished in 1919–1920; a memorial of Lithuanian as well as German and Russian soldiers fallen in World War I; and Red Army soldiers of World War II (constructed in 1951, rebuilt 1976–1984). The monument to Soviet soldiers was taken apart and transported to storage in December 2022 due to the Russian invasion of Ukraine.

In 2003, more than 3,000 French and other soldiers of the Grande Armée of Napoleon I who took part in the 1812 invasion of Russia were reburied at the cemetery, after their bodies were excavated some two years prior from French-dug trenches which were used by the victorious Russians as mass graves due to the frozen state of the ground; French and Lithuanian diplomats participated in the interment ceremony. The remains of 18 more soldiers from the army who were dumped into a different area were reburied in November 2010.

== Famous interments ==
The famous people buried in the Antakalnis Cemetery include:

- Algirdas Brazauskas (1932–2010), politician, first president of independent Lithuania, elected in 1993
- Teodor Bujnicki (1907–1944), Polish poet
- Vytautas Edmundas Čekanauskas (1930–2010), Lithuanian architect
- Ričardas Gavelis (1950–2002), Lithuanian writer, playwright, and journalist
- Sigitas Geda (1943–2008), Lithuanian poet, writer, playwright
- Romualdas Granauskas (1939–2014), Lithuanian writer, playwright
- Jurga Ivanauskaitė (1961–2007), Lithuanian writer
- Juozas Kamarauskas (1874–1946), Lithuanian painter
- Vytautas Kasiulis (1918–1995), Lithuanian painter of the School of Paris
- Vytautas Kernagis (1951–2008), Lithuanian singer and songwriter
- Kostas Kubilinskas (1923–1962), Lithuanian poet
- Jurgis Kunčinas (1947–2002), Lithuanian poet, writer
- Faustas Latėnas (1956–2020), Lithuanian composer, theatre manager
- Justinas Marcinkevičius (1930–2011), poet, writer and playwright
- Danas Pozniakas (1939–2005), Lithuanian boxer, the first Olympic champion from Lithuania
- Vytautas Šapranauskas (1958–2013), theater and film actor, television presenter, humorist
- Anton Schmid (1900–1942), German sergeant, Righteous Among the Nations
- Ieva Simonaitytė (1897–1978), Lithuanian writer
- Laurynas Stankevičius (1935–2017), Lithuanian politician, Prime Minister of Lithuania
- Antanas Venclova (1906–1979), Lithuanian and Soviet writer and politician
- Norbertas Vėlius (1938–1996), Lithuanian folklorist
- Rokas Žilinskas (1972–2017), Lithuanian journalist and politician
- Marian Zdziechowski (1861–1938), Polish philosopher and historian

== See also ==
- Rasos Cemetery
- Bernardine Cemetery (Vilnius)
- List of cemeteries in Lithuania
