= Kanuty Rusiecki =

Lithuanian, Belarusian and Polish painter

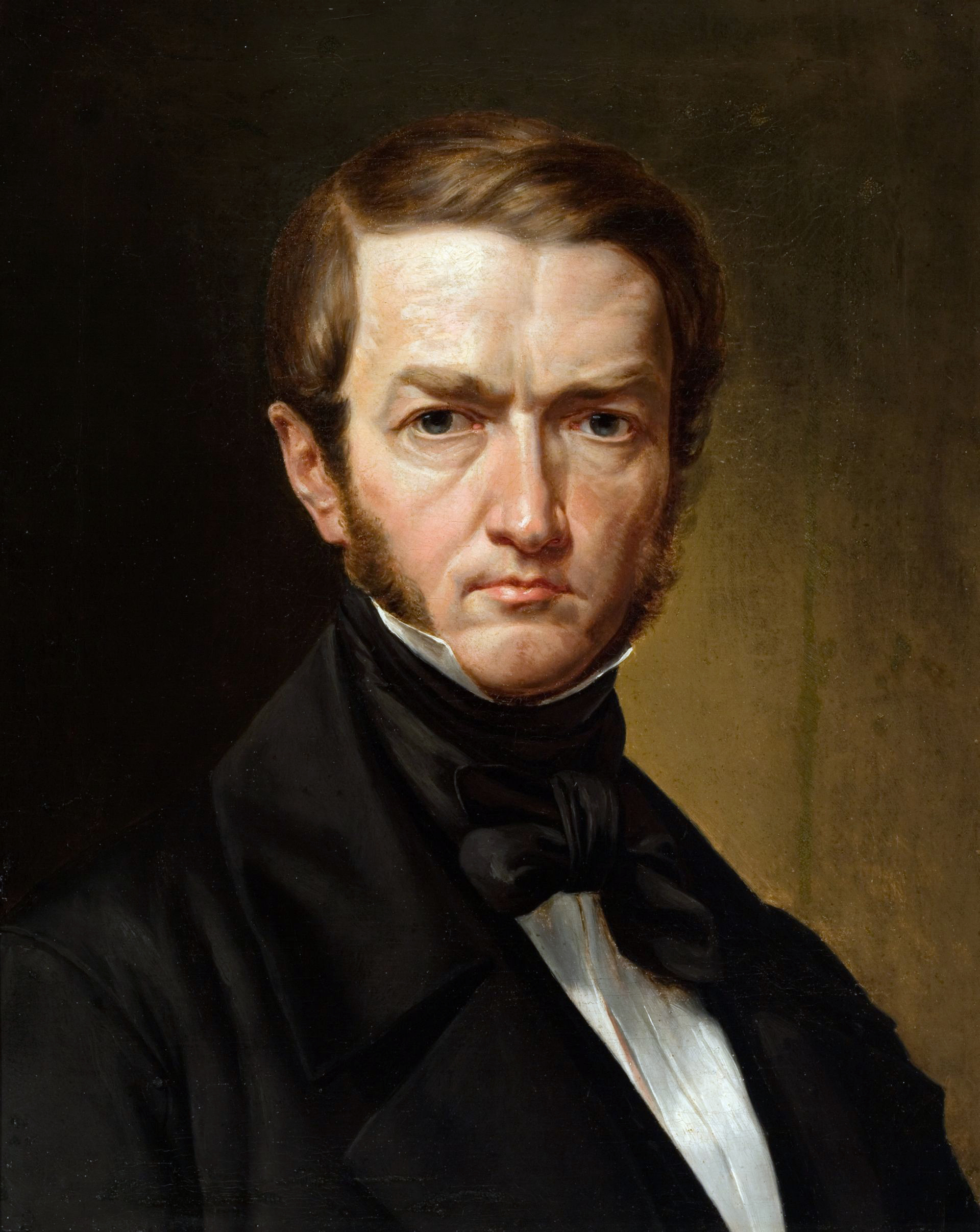
- Self-portrait (1830s)
- Born: 10 February 1800; Stebėkiai, Lithuania Governorate, Russian Empire
- Died: 2 September 1860 (aged 60); Vilna, Vilna Governorate, Russian Empire

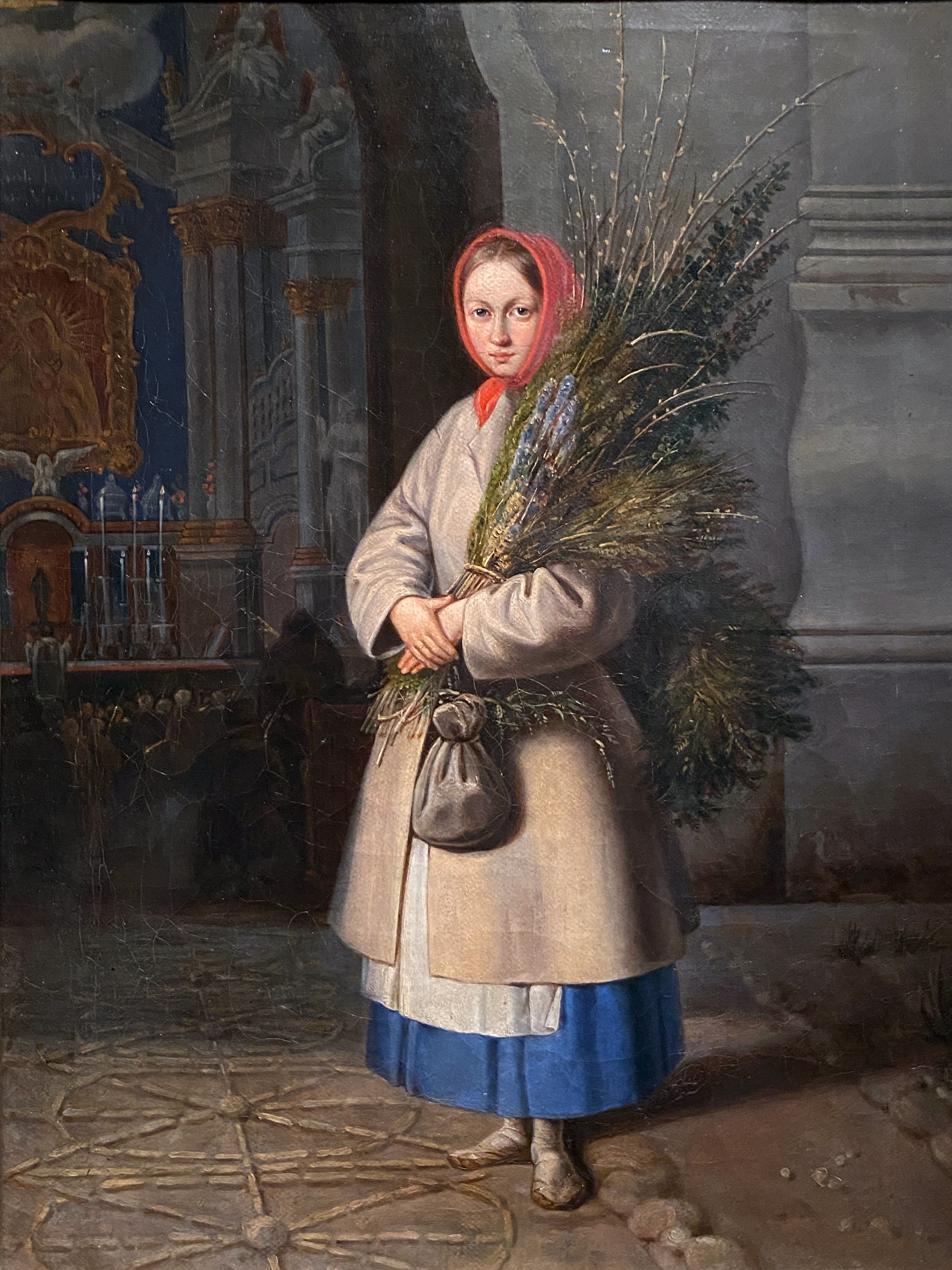
Lithuanian Girl with Willows (1847)

Kanuty Rusiecki (Lithuanian: Kanutas Ruseckas; 1800–1860) was a Polish-Lithuanian painter.

== Biography ==
He was born into an impoverished noble Polish-Lithuanian family in Lithuania and his father was a magistrate. He is said to have displayed his artistic talent at an early age, making impromptu models in wax. In 1816, he began his studies at the University of Vilnius. Initially, he studied law and mathematics, but eventually followed his true interests and, in 1818, switched to the study of art, under the tutelage of Jan Rustem and Kazimierz Jelski. During his stay at the university, he was a member of the Philomaths, a secret society of Polish students.

With letters of recommendation and his father's financial support (and following a secret marriage), he went to Paris and enrolled at the École nationale supérieure des Beaux-Arts from 1821 to 1822, studying with Guillaume Guillon-Lethière. He then spent a year at the Accademia di San Luca in Rome, where he worked with Vincenzo Camuccini and attended the sculpture workshop of Bertel Thorvaldsen. He also served as the informal leader of the Polish art community there and presented an exhibition of Polish Romantic painters. Between studies, he toured extensively, painting portraits and landscapes throughout Italy.

Beginning in 1831, he gave private drawing lessons in Vilnius. Three years later, he became a Professor at the "Wileński Instytut Szlachecki" (institute for the nobility) and taught there until his death. In 1856, he joined with Wincenty Dmochowski and Kazimierz Jelski in an effort to create an independent art school. He painted altar pictures and restored frescoes in many small churches throughout Lithuania, as well as at the Vilnius Cathedral.

Most of his canvases were in private collections that have been dispersed and are now difficult to trace. Although fairly numerous, all but a few of his known paintings are those that were left in his studio at the time of his death. They were preserved by his son Bolesław, who was also a painter, and later bequeathed to various museums in Poland, Lithuania and what is now Belarus.
