= Protestant Cemetery, Vilnius =

Former cemetery in Lithuania

Coordinates: 54.684°N 25.269°E

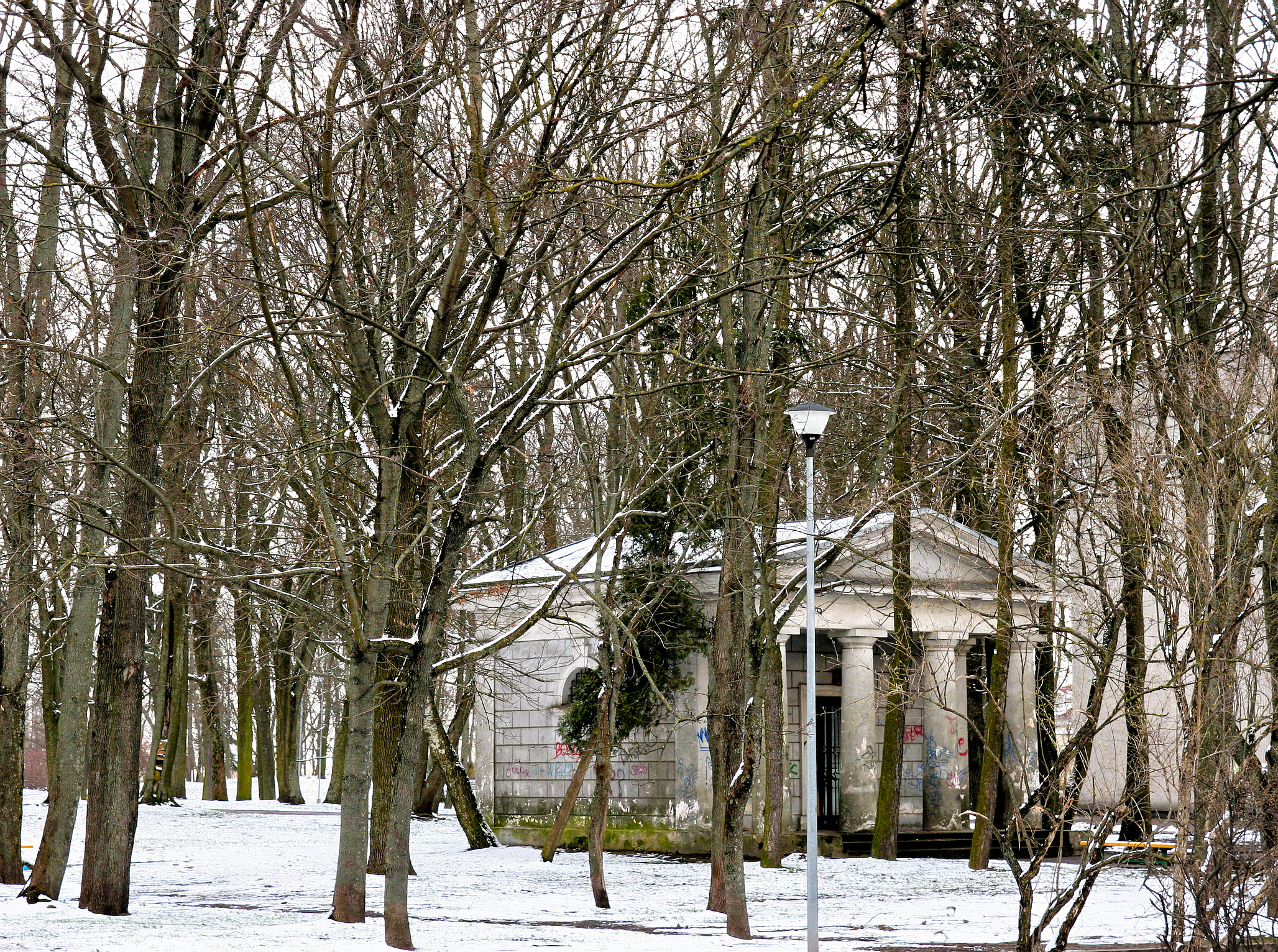
What remains of the former cemetery: vandalised mausoleum of Jan Fryderyk Niszkowski

The Protestant Cemetery in Vilnius, Lithuania, was established in the early 19th century. As the city grew, there was a need to move the old Lutheran cemetery outside the city walls. The old cemetery, used from 1550s, was located on land donated by the Radziwiłł family on Liejyklos Street. Before the old cemetery was closed a professor of Vilnius University made an inventory of interesting tombstones. The list was acquired by Eustachy Tyszkiewicz and was stored in the Museum of Antiquities that he founded.

The new cemetery was surrounded by a brick wall. It also had a shelter for the poor. The community built a brick chapel and incorporated some of the tombstones from the old cemetery. The white neo-classical chapel was equipped with bells and pipe organ. Since 1830, the cemetery was also used by Calvinists, who ran out of space in their old cemetery on Pylimo Street.

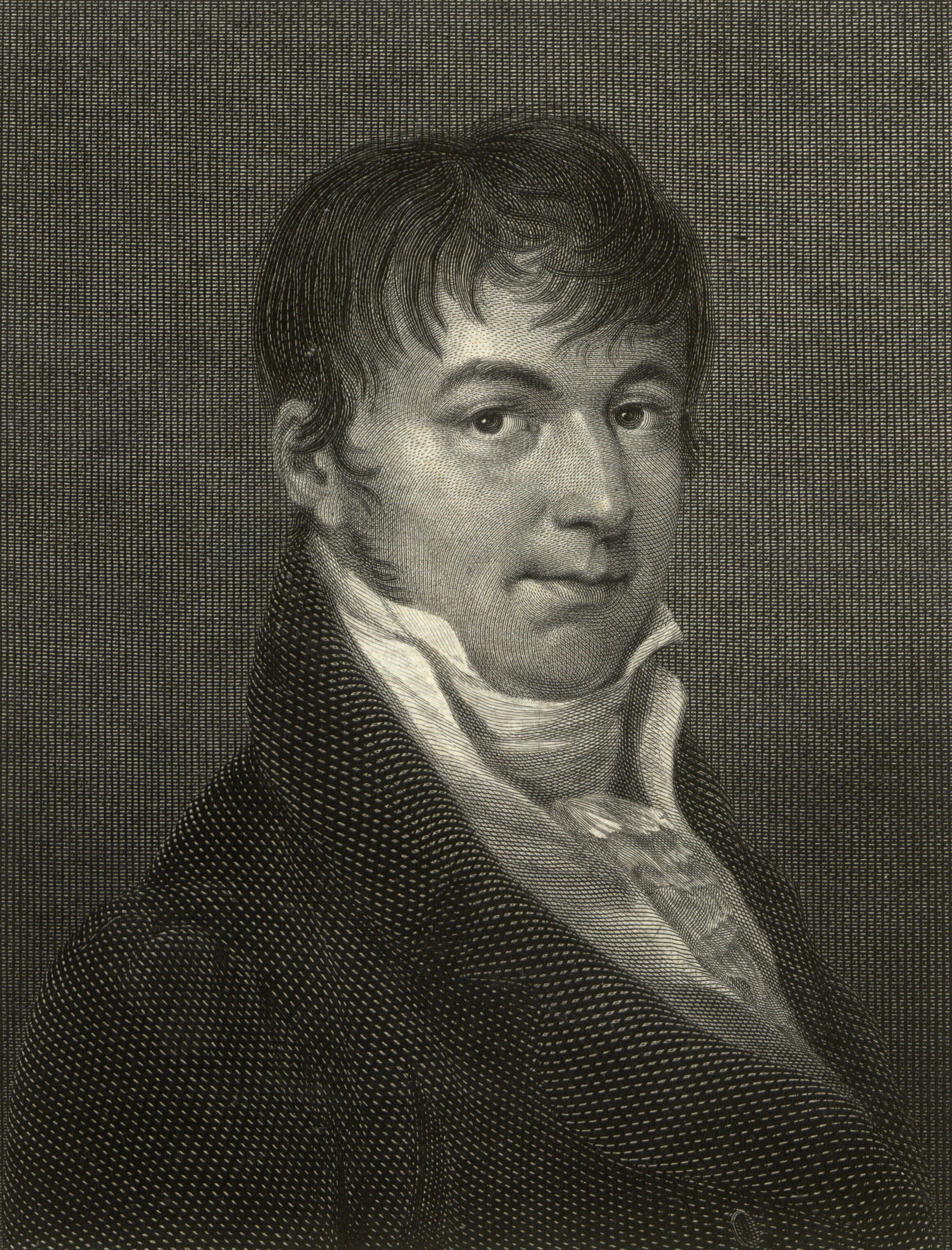
1819 Saunders etching of Niszkowski after Jan Rustem

In 1958 the cemetery was closed and in 1974 it was demolished and turned into a park by the Soviet authorities. The only remaining evidence of a cemetery is the Classical mausoleum for Jan Fryderyk Niszkowski, a prominent surgeon. The great chapel was also demolished and replaced by the Palace of Marriages (Lithuanian: Santuokų rūmai).

== See also ==
- List of cemeteries in Lithuania
