= Kazimierz Jelski =

Polish-Lithuanian architect and sculptor

Kazimierz Jelski; (Lithuanian: Kazimieras Jelskis)
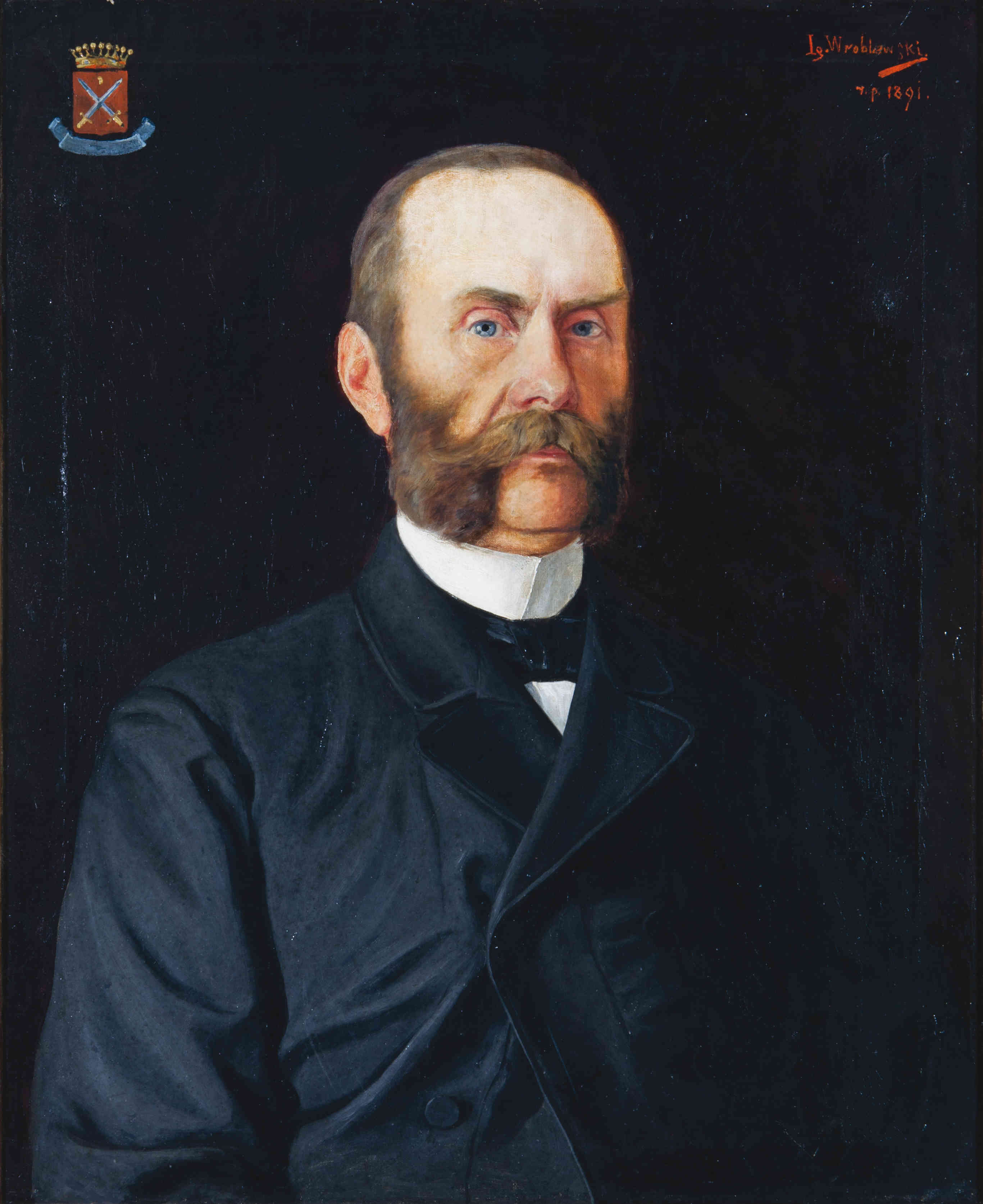
- Born: 4 March 1782; Ejsymonty, Trakai Voivodeship, Grand Duchy of Lithuania, Polish-Lithuanian Commonwealth
- Died: March 1867; Vilnius, Vilna Governorate, Russian Empire
- Father: Karol Jelski

Kazimierz Jelski (Belarusian: Казімі́р Е́льскі; Lithuanian: Kazimieras Jelskis) (1782 in Ejsymonty – March 1867 in Vilnius) was a Polish-Lithuanian Classicist architect and sculptor active in Lithuania.

Jelski was born in Ejsymonty near Grodno, in the Trakai Voivodeship of the Grand Duchy of Lithuania (now in Belarus). He was the son of Karol Jelski who was a Polish sculptor, painter and stucco artist. He first studied under his father. Between 1800 and 1808 he studied painting and architecture at the Vilnius University. For painting he studied under Laurynas Gucevičius and Franciszek Smuglewicz, architecture with Michała Szulca and sculpture with Andrzej Le Brun. From 1809 he studied sculpture at the Imperial Academy of Arts. From 1811 to 1826, Jelski worked as a professor of the University of Vilnius, where he trained many renowned sculptors. In 1833, he unsuccessfully tried to get a job as a professor of sculpture at the Jan Matejko Academy of Fine Arts, and in 1843 tried to set up his own school of sculpture in Vilnius. He also had expertise in the valuation and maintenance of sculptures. He collaborated with many famous sculptors.

At the end of his life he was forced to arrange English kitchens and build steam mills in the estates. He performed primarily classical sculptures and bas-reliefs and religious monuments and busts and medallions which displayed portraits of famous people of Polish culture and historical figures.

Some of his key works include the figures of plaster in the Vilnius Cathedral, statues and bas-reliefs at the Evangelical Reformed Church, four sculptures at St. Peter and St. Paul's Church, and numerous monuments in Vilnius and Trakai. He also authored a book The union of architecture, sculpture and painting (1832). Jelski died March 1867 in Vilnius.
