= Startup Poland =

Polish technology think tank

Coordinates: 52°13′3.16″N 21°0′57.186″E

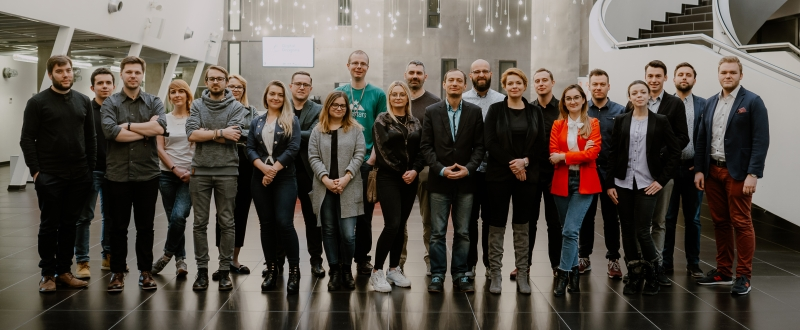
- The board and the local ambassadors of the Startup Poland Foundation
- Formation: April 24, 2015; 11 years ago
- Founded at: Warsaw
- Type: Foundation
- Location: Warsaw
- Region served: Poland
- Services: Business intelligence; Business analysis; Economic diplomacy; Public advocacy; Innovation management; Knowledge management
- Fields: Startup ecosystem; Think tank; Venture capital; Investment
- CEO: Tomasz Snażyk
- Volunteers: 16 Local Ambassadors
- Website: startuppoland.org

The Startup Poland Foundation (Polish: Fundacja Startup Poland) is a Polish think tank and a non-governmental organization established to raise awareness of the economic potential of startup companies among the public administration, and to represent the Polish startup community in the regulatory processes.

The organization was set up by a group of local entrepreneurs, lawyers, researchers, and investors. Since April 2020, the Foundation is directed by the chief executive Tomasz Snażyk.

== The Foundation's goal ==
The purpose of Startup Poland is to identify and eliminate systemic barriers in Polish law and administration, which limit the rapid growth and development of young companies, as well as to promote regulation and recommend activities that stimulate technology entrepreneurship. These activities are to help create a legislative and administrative environment in Poland to support the development of innovative projects with global reach. This in turn is to contribute to the acceleration of GDP growth by creating jobs and stopping the process of talent drainage.

Startup Poland works on developing the local technological entrepreneurship and startup-financing infrastructure. The foundation also represents the interests of Polish technology entrepreneurs in the dialogue with the public administration, the European Union institutions, corporations, and the academic community.

=== Program postulates ===
On April 22, 2015, at the European Economic Congress in Katowice, the Foundation presented its program declaration that calls out the main barriers and challenges facing Polish startups:

- promoting the culture of investing in startups by creating conditions favorable to the emergence of strong market ventures;
- conducting consultations with the public sector on legal changes to support the development of the startup ecosystem, which would result in the selection of the most useful and scalable projects;
- providing citizens with more data collected in public offices;
- creating the position of the Chief Technology Officer of the Polish administration, or the proxy for technological innovation at the government and local-government level, the person deciding on the direction of the use of modern technologies;
- increasing the attractiveness of the Polish economy for entrepreneurs and specialists from outside the European Union, by creating a simple and transparent system for granting visas;
- introducing entrepreneurship lessons in schools with trained teachers supported by practitioners;
- introducing effective incentives to create programs for educating technology entrepreneurs, run by venture capital funds and local communities;
- developing simple procedures for the transfer of public funds and better mechanisms for distributing financial resources from the European Union to investors who offer not only financial but also substantive support;
- introducing favorable tax mechanisms – changes in provisions of a joint-stock company and limited joint-stock partnership, modeled as a convertible debt, and enabling the use of the option pool in a limited-liability company and joint-stock company – legal forms suited to selling their shares as part of equity crowdfunding – which would significantly increase the interest of business angels in investments in young, innovative enterprises in Poland;
- creating a support system and procedures for startups investors – as a directory of through API-provided services, used in all offices, at every level of administration.

== Foundation's history ==
A group of several dozen entrepreneurs from rapidly developing small and medium technology enterprises was involved in creating the organization which would integrate and represent the interests of the young and dynamic Polish businesses.

The appointment of the coalition was initiated by Borys Musielak, the founder of the coworking center Reaktor, along with Michał Juda and Jan Stasz. The three was backed by 150 startup founders. The Polish Internet pioneer Piotr Wilam, and Konrad Latkowski joined the council of the Foundation, while mentors Rafał Brzoska and Michał Brański were appointed to the program council. In November 2014, the Foundation's program declaration was presented. And in April 2015, the Foundation selected its president Eliza Kruczkowska, who in October 2016 was succeeded by Julia Krysztofiak-Szopa. Since April 2020 the president is Tomasz Snażyk.

== Publications ==
=== Polish Startups ===
Since 2015, Startup Poland publishes the annual report Polish Startups on the state of the Polish startup scene – micro-, small- and medium-sized enterprises which create the digital industry in Poland. The report publishes results of research on the impact of the digital industry on the economy, directions and pace of industry development carried out in collaboration with the Warsaw University of Technology. The annual publication walks through business models implemented by Polish startups, popular sources of capital in young companies, the level of employment, and scope of export activities.

The Polish Startups reports present the ongoing largest study of the Polish startup scene, showing the dynamics of changes: in employment, sources of capital, and sales of services abroad. In 2016, the survey was extended to include data from the Czech Republic, Slovakia, and Hungary. The 2017 edition focused on exports and financing in startups. Since 2016, the report has its premiere at the Economic Forum in Krynica.

=== The Golden Book of Venture Capital in Poland ===
Since 2018, the Foundation publishes the annual report on the Polish venture capital market, The Golden Book of Venture Capital in Poland. The first edition of the report introduced to the mechanics of VC funds, and described how VC investors in Poland work with startups. It also described the role of state funds as a lever in investments in the venture. While the second edition analyzed the scale of the VC market in Poland, the profiles of major players and details of the largest transactions and capital managed by Polish funds. Based on the answers of 70 VC companies, the report showcased the image of the local venture capital market.

=== The Start-up Handbook ===
In October 2015, Startup Poland published the guide to the legal issues faced by the people who run startups, and who intend to set up a new business. The Start-up Handbook was the first comprehensive development on the Polish market of legal aspects of functioning startups, resulting from a large number of applicable regulations, diversity, and an innovative character of implemented projects.

=== Visa Policies for Startups ===
In the June 2016 analysis of visa programs for startups operating in the world, Startup Poland called for the creation of a strategy for attracting tech talents to Poland. In Visa Policies for Startups, the Foundation emphasized that too small supply of specialists on the market may become a key barrier to the development of technology companies in Poland.

=== The Visegrad Startup Report ===
In June 2017, the Foundation published the first-of-its-kind set of data on startup ecosystems of the Visegrad Group countries The Visegrad Startup Report, with distinguished factors which attract startups and investors to the Visegrad Group region, in terms of the development of startup entrepreneurship.

== Foundation's projects ==
=== Public advocacy ===
==== 2015 ====
Startup Poland appealed for the adoption of the act on supporting innovation, the project of which was proposed by President Bronisław Komorowski, and which was signed by President Andrzej Duda on October 16, 2015.

In December 2015, the Foundation’s representatives participated in consultations of the European Commission on the Digital Single Market.

==== 2016 ====
In February 2016, at the request of the Ministry of Development, the Foundation took a position on the draft directive on certain aspects of contracts for the supply of digital content.

In March 2016, the Foundation gave its opinion on the assumptions of the program “Start in Poland” presented by the Ministry of Development.

Since March 2016, Startup Poland is involved in the process of developing a new legal form for Polish startups, created as part of the new Business Constitution, with facilitation for innovative enterprises. In consultations with startups, the name “simple joint-stock company” (Polish: prosta spółka akcyjna) was chosen. From July 2016, the Foundation participates with the Ministry of Development in pre-consultations regarding the outline of the concept of a simple joint-stock company, which had resulted in the Foundation's extensive position. In 2018, the Foundation managed to persuade the Ministry to depart from the solvency tests present in the bill.

In May 2016, Startup Poland supported the European Commission during consultations with the business community and startups, on ideas for the development of the European ecosystem. In turn, from March to July 2016, the Foundation conducted Polish consultations as part of creating the program Start-up Initiative that aimed to improve conditions for the development of European startups and fast-growing enterprises.

In November 2016, Startup Poland presented a position in consultations of the European Commission's proposals regarding copyright reform, conducted by the Ministry of Culture and National Heritage, supporting the elimination of geo-blocking, and against text and data mining under license.

==== 2017 ====
In March 2017, at the Parliamentary Committee for European Affairs, the Foundation called for a veto against entry-level provisions on the copyright law that were dangerous for startups. In June 2017, the Foundation proposed changes to the Act on Supporting Innovation.

In November 2017, Startup Poland, in a coalition with the Lewiatan Confederation, submitted comments to the draft law on transparency of public life.

==== 2018 ====
In April 2018, the Foundation organized an international round table with entrepreneurs and politicians, devoted to the EU ePrivacy regulations which tighten the rules of online privacy, intervening in the big data, M2M, IoT and adtech sectors.

In August 2018, Startup Poland published a position on the concept of a new Public Procurement Law that would facilitate start-ups in the public procurement market.

In October 2018, the Foundation presented a position for a bill regarding changes in corporate income tax, establishing lower CIT for small taxpayers, changes in withholding tax, taxation on profit from bitcoin sales, as well as innovation box and exit tax.

=== Startups at the Palace ===
The Foundation organized three conferences with the participation of Polish startups in the Presidential Palace – presentations of business projects before President Andrzej Duda, ambassadors, representatives of State Treasury companies, venture capitalists, and business angels. The first events of this type in Poland with the participation of the current head of state took place on September 13, 2016, March 14, 2017, and October 4, 2017. The startups participating in the events then took part in the foreign economic missions of the President, including Sweden, Switzerland, and Israel.

=== International cooperation ===
Since 2016, Startup Poland has been cooperating with Allied for Startups which operates in Brussels, to remove barriers and create legal solutions optimal for the development of startups in Europe.

In September 2016, the Foundation, together with 15 other non-profit organizations from all over Europe, inaugurated in Brussels the creation of the European Startup Network, connecting European startup ecosystems. The aim of the initiative is to support the activities of the European Commission in the area of building a digital single market in the European Union, while respecting the local market autonomy, regulatory environment, and entrepreneurial culture.

In December 2016, the Foundation carried out the Startup Poland Global program preparing Polish startups for international expansion.

=== Local Ambassadors ===
Startup Poland’s Local Ambassadors are volunteers who work for urban startups, in cooperation with universities and capital investors. They maintain local relations with local governments, when preparing support programs, and inform local media about the successes of startups from the region. Since September 2017, the Ambassadors organize local Startup Camps held across Poland.

== Awards and accolades ==
In May 2017, on the Polonia and Poles Abroad Day, the Foundation received a state flag from the President of the Republic of Poland, as a non-governmental organization deserved in the activities for the benefit of the Polish diaspora.

In October 2017, Startup Poland received the prize in the "Startup Patron" category, in the Eagle of Innovation Startup competition, organized by the editorial staff of Rzeczpospolita.
