= Bolesław Rusiecki =

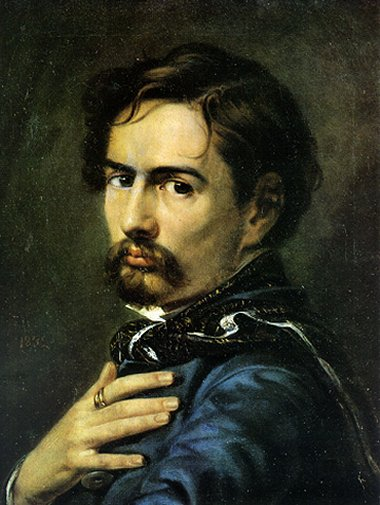
Self-portrait (1852)

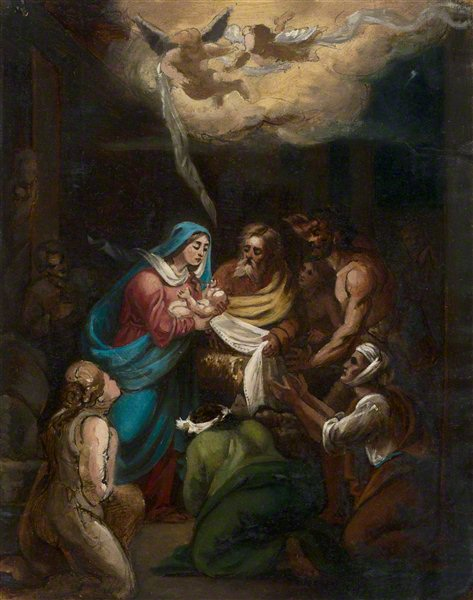
Adoration of the Shepherds

Bolesław Michał Rusiecki (Lithuanian: Boleslovas Mykolas Ruseckas; 23 November 1824 — 31 January 1913) was a Polish-Lithuanian painter and art collector.

== Biography ==
Rusiecki was born on 23 November 1824 in Rome. He was initially a student at the "Wileński Instytut Szlachecki" (institute for the nobility), then studied medicine at the University of Saint Petersburg. His father was the painter, Kanuty Rusiecki. From 1843 to 1850, he audited classes at the Imperial Academy of Fine Arts, taught by Karl Bryullov and Fyodor Bruni. Upon completing them, he was awarded the title of "Free Artist". He was named an Academician in 1853 for his allegorical painting, "Połączenie Willi z Niemnem“ (The Confluence of the Viliya into the Neman)

In 1857, he and his wife Stefania, née Karpowicz, went on an extended trip abroad; visiting several cities in Poland, as well as Dresden, Prague, Vienna and Trieste. From 1858 to 1861, they lived in Rome. Upon returning, they settled at the family estate near Białystok, but after Stefanija's death in 1866, at the age of only thirty-seven, he moved into Vilnius and taught drawing at the gymnasium. During this period, he created several religious paintings; notably an image of Saint Stanislaus, for Vilnius Cathedral, and one of Saint Casimir, for St. Francis Xavier Cathedral, Grodno. Most of his works were portraits or landscapes.

He was also a collector of art and related materials, including archaeological artefacts. In addition, he became a member of a committee devoted to creating a monument for the writer and poet, Adam Mickiewicz. Pursuant to that, he went to Kraków to obtain a bust of Mickiewicz; sculpted by Marceli Guyski and cast in Paris. The monument itself was designed by the architect, Tadeusz Stryjeński, and it was installed in 1898, at the Church of St. Johns, Vilnius. The project had been met with opposition, despite having been suggested by Mickiewicz's son, and it was dedicated without a ceremony in 1899.

Toward the end of his life, he bequeathed his art collection, archives and library to the Society of the Friends of Science, and donated 10,000 Rubles for the construction of a building to house them. His works may be seen at the Lithuanian National Museum of Art, the National Museum, Kraków, and the National Museum, Warsaw.

Rusiecki died on 31 January 1913 in Vilnius.
