= Ludwik Sobolewski =

Polish lawyer and executive (born 1965)

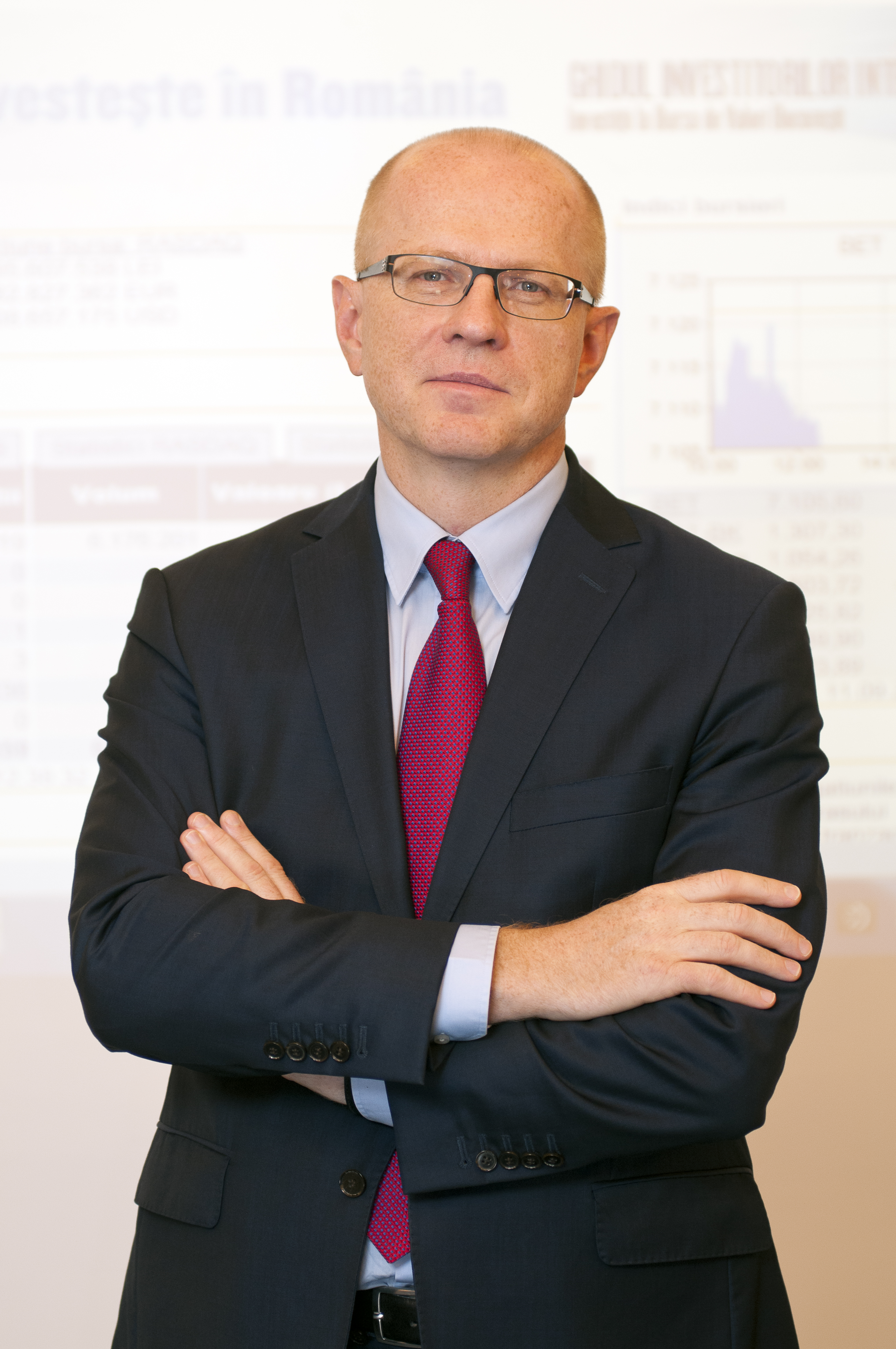

CEO of the Bucharest Stock Exchange
- Preceded by: Victor Cionga

Personal details
- Born: Ludwik Leszek Sobolewski; 1965 (age 60–61) Wrocław, Poland
- Education: Jagiellonian University; Université Panthéon-Assas (Paris II)

Ludwik Leszek Sobolewski (born 13 September 1965) is a Polish lawyer. He was the CEO of the Bucharest Stock Exchange between 2013 and 2017.

== Professional career ==
Sobolewski was president and CEO of the Warsaw Stock Exchange (WSE) between 2006 and 2013. During his mandate, WSE became the leading stock exchange in CEE and a listed company on its own regulated market since 2010, after the rolling of a successful IPO. Sobolewski supported the business development of the stock exchange, by attracting new companies for listing, increasing the number of international members of the WSE, and by promoting the services and products of the exchange. He also played an active role in the creation of the capital market infrastructure, with NewConnect, a market for start-ups, early stage and small and medium-size companies, with Catalyst market, the first organized, exchange-type market for non-treasury debt securities in Poland, with the BondSpot SA and the Polish Power Exchange SA acquisition.

Before WSE, Sobolewski spent several years as the executive vice-president of the Polish National Depository for Securities (and Clearing House). He was also chairman of a number of supervisory boards of the following companies: PAK, IDEA TFI, National Depository for Securities SA, Polish Power Exchange SA, BondSpot SA, Exchange Centre SA, WSE InfoEngine SA, National Board for Research and Development, "Poland Now" Foundation.

== Education and honors ==
Sobolewski is a lawyer by education. In 1989 he graduated from the Law and Administration Faculty of the Jagiellonian University in Kraków. He holds the title of Doctor of Law (PhD) from Université Panthéon-Assas (Paris II). He is legal advisor and, in that capacity, member of the Bar of Legal Advisors. Between 2006 and 2010, Sobolewski was the president of the Association of Polish Lawyers.

He was decorated twice with one of the highest Polish medals, the Order of Polonia Restituta by the presidents of Poland for his merits in developing the capital market in Poland.
