= Fundrise =

Financial technology company

Fundrise, LLC.
- Type: Private
- Industry: Financial services Financial technology Real Estate Investing; Real estate investment trust Venture Capital
- Founded: 2010; 16 years ago
- Founders: Ben Miller; Dan Miller; Kenneth Shin; Brandon Jenkins
- Headquarters: Washington, D.C., U.S.
- Key people: Ben Miller, Co-Founder and CEO; Brandon Jenkins, COO; Alison Staloch, CFO
- Total assets: $7.0 billion (2025)
- Number of employees: 123 (2020)
- Parent: Rise Companies Corp.
- Website: fundrise.com

Fundrise is a Washington, D.C.–based financial technology company founded in 2010 that operates an online investment platform. Fundrise operates a multi-asset platform offering access to real estate, private credit, and venture capital opportunities for investors. As of 2025, Fundrise manages approximately $2.87 billion of equity for its investors and has invested $7 billion worth of real estate across the United States.

== History ==
Fundrise was founded in 2010 by brothers Ben and Dan Miller and launched in 2012 before the passing of the JOBS Act, which enacted securities regulation to streamline the process of equity crowdfunding in the United States. Their father, Herb Miller of Western Development Corp., developed 20 million square feet of real estate based in Washington, D.C. Ben Miller worked as President of Western Development Corp. and Managing Partner of WestMill Capital Partners prior to Fundrise. Prior to Fundrise, Dan Miller worked for Western Development Corp. and also as Managing Partner of WestMill Capital Partners. The brothers founded the company with the idea to allow residents in the D.C. area to invest in real estate development projects they were building. Fundrise's first project, Maketto, in the H Street NE Corridor in Washington D.C. raised $325,000 from 175 investors, where any resident of D.C. or Virginia could invest for as little as $100, making it the first crowdfunded real estate project in the United States.

=== Early growth ===
After the initial project, Fundrise was contacted by real estate companies looking to use the Fundrise platform to raise capital. Soon thereafter, the company expanded its platform to allow conventional real estate investments from commercial developers across the United States.

By May 2014, the company reported having facilitated $15 million in investments involving 1,000+ investors. One of Fundrise's most publicized investments came in January 2015 when it began offering bonds for the construction of 3 World Trade Center, the location of the third tallest tower at the site of the World Trade Center in lower Manhattan. The initial offering was for $2 million of the $5 million worth of bonds purchased by Fundrise for the financing of the $1 billion project. Bonds were offered for $5,000 each with a 5% tax-free gross annual return for five years.

Fundrise also raised more capital in its first-round of Series A investment than any other crowdfunding company, totaling $38 million. Funding was led by Chinese social networking company Renren, which invested $31 million of the total $38 million. Additional Series A investors include Guggenheim Partners, Justin Elghanayan of Rockrose Development Corporation, and James Ratner of Forest City Enterprises. By February 2015, Fundrise had commitments from six institutional investors for an additional $100 million in investment into the company's real estate offerings. In October 2015, co-founder and president Daniel Miller left the company to begin his new venture, Steward, an online lending platform for regenerative agriculture.

In February 2016, Fundrise terminated its senior accountant for allegedly attempting to extort over $1 million from the enterprise. The accountant denied the allegations and claimed that the termination was retaliation for reporting "serious fraudulent behavior." The company denied the claims and hired an outside audit firm to investigate the allegations, which concluded there was no reasonable basis to the allegations.

=== eREIT launch ===
On December 3, 2015, Fundrise launched the Fundrise Real Estate Investment Trust, the world's first online real estate investment trust or "eREIT" with an initial offering of $50 million pursuant to Regulation A+.

The Fundrise eREIT offering provides prospective investors with the opportunity to invest in an intended portfolio of properties across the United States for a minimum of $1,000. The aim of the eREIT is to use new technology to give both accredited and unaccredited investors the option to invest in U.S. real estate. This financial offering was made possible by the expansion of Regulation A under the JOBS Act.

The company subsequently opened a second eREIT, the Fundrise Equity REIT, in February 2016.

In December 2016, the Fundrise Income eREIT was the first company to raise $50 million, the maximum amount allowed under Regulation A. Later in December 2016, the Fundrise Growth eREIT became the second ever issuer to raise $50 million pursuant to Regulation A.

=== eFund launch ===
In June 2017, Fundrise announced the eFund, a diversified portfolio of for-sale housing in major U.S. cities. The first eFund was the Los Angeles eFund, with an initial offering of $50 million under Regulation A+. In conjunction with the eFund launch, Fundrise introduced a goal-based investing and an advisory service.

=== 2021-present ===
In 2021, Fundrise received $300 million in credit from Goldman Sachs to invest in developing single family homes in the Sun Belt.

As of 2022, Fundrise had close to 350,000 investors, the majority of whom were aged 25-40. Since 2021, the equity portion of its portfolio has doubled from $1.5 billion to over $3 billion. While total dollar holdings (including project debt) stood around $6 billion.

By late 2022, Fundrise launched its Innovation Fund, enabling non-accredited retail investors to participate in venture capital opportunities, particularly in AI and fintech. In January 2023, Fundrise launched its Opportunistic Credit Fund. The fund focuses on accredited investors, providing high-yield and real estate-backed debt investments to combat reduced bank lending and rising interest rates across the market.

In March 2024, Fundrise secured $770 million credit facility from J.P. Morgan aimed at growing its portfolio across the Sun Belt.

In July 2025, financial technology company SoFi began offering funds from Fundrise’s Innovation Fund. As of 2025, the Innovation Fund has raised over $252 million with around 74,000 active investors. The portfolio includes companies such as OpenAI, Anthropic, Ramp, and Omni.

In January 2026, the United States Department of Homeland Security purchased a warehouse near Hagerstown, Maryland from FRIND-Hopewell, a shell company set up by Fundrise. The Maryland congressional delegation sent a letter to DHS stating that they understood the purpose of the transaction was to covert the warehouse into a holding facility for immigration detainees.

== Awards ==
Fundrise was selected for the Forbes Fintech 50 list in 2015, 2016, 2017, and 2019. In 2018, Fundrise placed position 35 overall and position 1 in the financial services industry on the Inc. 5,000 list. Fundrise was also placed on the 2023, 2024, and 2025 Inc. 5,000 list.

In 2024 and 2025, CNBC listed Fundrise on its ‘World’s Top Fintech Companies’ report.

== See also ==
- Alternative investment
- Disruptive innovation
- Registered Investment Adviser
- Regulation A
- CrowdsUnite
