= Testing the waters =

Process in US politics

In the United States, the phrase testing the waters is used to describe someone who is exploring the feasibility of becoming a candidate for political office. It can also be used more generally as an idiom meaning to estimate the success of something by trying it out a little bit.

"Testing the waters" activities are to be paid for with candidate-permissible funds. Once an individual begins to campaign or decides to become a candidate, funds that were raised or spent to "test the waters" apply to the $5,000 threshold for qualifying as a candidate. This is because there is a federal law that once an individual raises or spends $5,000 for a campaign, they are required to register as a federal candidate. Once that threshold is exceeded, the individual must register with the Federal Election Commission (FEC; for candidates for the United States House of Representatives) or the Secretary of the Senate (candidates for the United States Senate), and begin filing reports (including in the first report all activity that occurred prior to reaching the $5,000 threshold).

Once an individual registers as a federal candidate, election restrictions apply, including $2,700 on contributions. Also, once registered as a candidate, individuals cannot coordinate with political action committees (PACs) or super PACs under campaign finance law.

== Use in investment crowdfunding ==
In addition to its use in political campaigns, testing the waters is also a concept used in investment crowdfunding under U.S. securities law. Platforms like RaiseSpark, Wefunder, and StartEngine allow early-stage companies to gauge investor interest in a potential Regulation CF (Reg CF) or Regulation A+ (Reg A+) offering before officially launching their capital raise.

This form of TTW enables founders to:

- Share their business concept with potential investors
- Collect non-binding indications of interest
- Build momentum and refine messaging before filing full securities documentation

Platforms like these provide compliant landing pages, branded forms, and marketing funnels that help founders gather pre-launch leads and measure traction. This data is often used to inform campaign strategy, fine-tune investor messaging, or determine whether to proceed with a full raise.

While the TTW phase doesn't involve actual investments, once a certain level of interest is reached or filings are made, the issuer must follow SEC rules and register the offering. This mirrors the threshold used in political testing the waters, where early activity eventually triggers official registration and regulatory obligations.
