= Confidentcrowd =

American equity crowdfunding portal

- Company type: Crowdfunding
- Headquarters: Phoenix, AZ, {{{location_country}}}
- Industry: Financial services
- Website: www.confidentcrowd.com

Confidentcrowd was an American equity crowdfunding portal based in Phoenix, Arizona. The company was associated with the Jumpstart Our Business Startups Act (JOBS Act) of 2012 and was identified as one of the earliest Crowdfunding portals launched in the United States after the JOBS Act made crowdfunding for equity permissible under US law. The company is also noted for its unusual crowdfunding approach which requires investment seekers to undergo screening by FINRA-licensed Broker-Dealers before they can access potential funding.

== Crowdfunding approach ==
Confidentcrowd's portal acts as a “meetingplace” for FINRA-registered Broker-Dealers, individuals seeking to invest, and companies & individuals seeking investment. The company's portal is based upon a “membership base of broker dealers”., who register Investment opportunities to the site to get access to investors. The Confidentcrowd site requires entrepreneurs to posting a listing of their opportunity and to be screened by a FINRA-member broker-dealer before a funding offering can occur. The company's founder cites this process as a means to mitigate risk by “evaluating and structuring’ investments before offering.

== JOBS Act ==
Signed on April 5, 2012, the JOBS Act has been identified as one of the most influential changes to US securities law since the 1930s and is reported as having the potential to dramatically reshape the financing landscape of American business. One of the JOBS Act's widely reported provisions is that it exempts crowdfunding from many of the SEC regulations that restrict the raising of capital through private equity exchange.

== Market ==
After the JOBS Act was passed, it became possible for US companies to offer company equity in exchange for financial backing via Crowdfunding. To make this offering, companies can offer their equity through a licensed Broker-Dealer or via a Crowdfunding portal which also must be licensed via the SEC. In 2012, several portals have launched to pursue this market.

Crowdfunding is functionally similar to a private placement, but the crowdfunding structure makes it more attractive to those seeking smaller investments. Investment banks have reported that crowdfunding makes it economically feasible to raise smaller amounts of capital than with other methods

== Partners ==
Confidentcrowd is associated with Phoenix, Arizona, investment bank Dinan & Company. and Crowdfund Intermediary Regulatory Advocates (CFIRA), and Crowdfunding Professional Association (CFPA).

== See also ==
- Comparison of crowd funding services
