= Groundfloor =

Groundfloor may refer to:

- Ground floor, the ground-level storey of a building
- Groundfloor (company), an American real estate lending marketplace

== See also ==
- Ground Floor, American TV sitcom
