= Return on Change =

Return on Change (RoC) is an equity crowdfunding platform that connects investors with innovative and socially conscious startups. Return on Change works with startups that operate in five sectors, each of which touches on sustainability in some way: cleantech, edtech, life sciences, social enterprises, and technology. An online equity crowdsourcing platform, RoC helps socially conscious ventures raise capital.

== History ==
Sang Lee, CEO and founder and native New Yorker, founded Return on Change in 2012, in anticipation of the JOBS Act. Lee became interested in the idea after working for six years as an investment banker in the power and energy sector and noticing the difficulties that startups in these industries faced when raising money from traditional sources. He created Return on Change, which started helping startups sell equity to accredited investors, or those who make at least $200,000 a year and have $1 million in assets, in the summer of 2013. The platform is among the first to take advantage of the Jumpstart Our Business Startups Act (JOBS), which passed in 2012. In addition to his work at RoC, Sang is also the Executive Director of CF50, a global crowdfunding leadership think tank.

== Equity Crowdfunding ==
With the passage of the JOBS act, equity crowdfunding, which allows companies to sell equity shares through crowdfunding sites, became legal in 2012. However, the SEC is still reviewing regulations that would allow non-accredited investors to make equity investments.

== Milestones ==
In May 2014, cleantech startup Geostellar closed a $1 million round using the RoC platform. Geostellar is an online marketplace for financing and installing solar panels. It is a solar marketplace that aims to map the solar power potential of every residence in the U.S., while demonstrating to homeowners their potential cost savings. “Raising capital online since the JOBS Act makes it much easier to spread the word, get potential investors engaged and provide information,” David Levine, the CEO of Geostellar, said in the company’s announcement.

== Press Coverage ==
Return on Change has become a leader within crowdfunding discourse and has been featured in publications such as BetaBeat, Reuters, Ecopreneurist, and Crains. Forbes wrote about the platform in August 2013.

== See also ==
- Jumpstart Our Business Startups Act
- Crowdsourcing
- Crowdfunding
- Comparison of crowd funding services
