= MapLight =

- Established: March 2005
- President and co-founder: Daniel Newman
- Location: Berkeley, California
- Website: www.maplight.org

MapLight is a nonpartisan, nonprofit research organization that reveals and tracks the influence of money in politics in the United States. The organization publishes a free public database linking money and politics data sources, including campaign contributions to politicians, how politicians vote on bills, and support and opposition to legislation. MapLight provides data on both campaign finance and voting behavior in one database. MapLight uses an in-house research team in addition to data sources that include OpenSecrets and GovTrack.

== Policy positions ==
MapLight advocates for public funding of elections and increased campaign finance regulations. MapLight expressed disagreement with the Supreme Court rulings Citizens United v. Federal Election Commission and McCutcheon v. Federal Election Commission.

== Funding ==
MapLight's donors include the Sunlight Foundation, Open Society Foundations, MacArthur Foundation, Ford Foundation, and the Tides Foundation. In June 2014, Politico reported that MapLight was a recipient of funding through the Democracy Alliance, a network of liberal donors who coordinate their anonymous political giving. According to the Milwaukee Journal Sentinel, in 2010 George Soros underwrote a joint project between MapLight and the Wisconsin Center for Investigative Journalism to highlight the influence of money in Wisconsin politics.
