= David Weild IV =

American investment banker

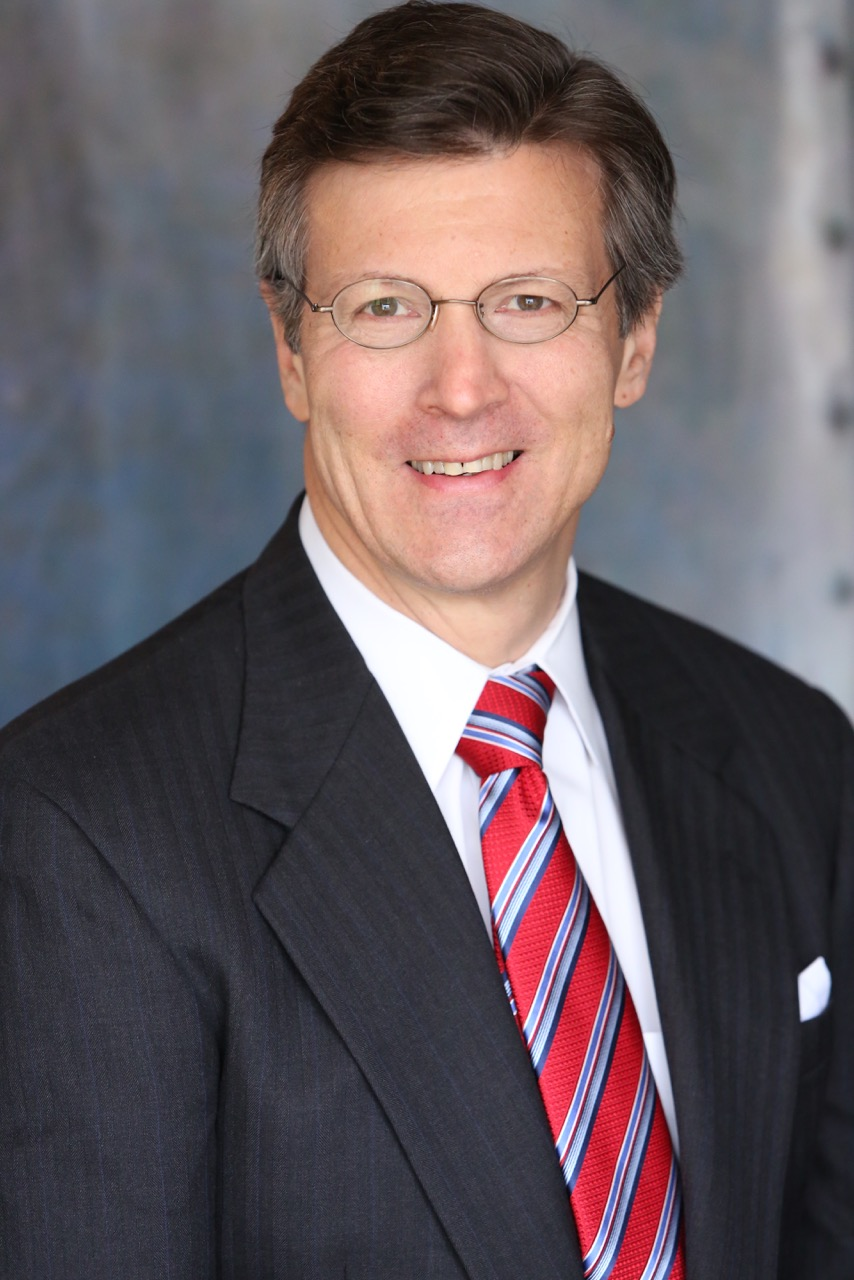
- Photo by Yolanda Perez
- Education: Wesleyan and New York University's Stern School of Business
- Occupation: Investment banker
- Known for: Former Vice Chairman of NASDAQ

David Weild IV is an American investment banker and financial commentator best known for holding the position as Vice Chairman of NASDAQ. He is currently the Founder, Chairman and CEO of Weild & Co. Inc., parent company of the investment banking firm Weild Capital, LLC (dba Weild & Co.) Weild is also known as the "father" of the JOBS Act, and has been involved in drafting legislation for the US Congress.

== Early life ==
Weild graduated from Hotchkiss School preparatory in 1974, then went on to earn a B.A. from Wesleyan and an M.B.A. from New York University's Stern School of Business.

== Career ==
Weild spent the first fourteen years of his career in senior management positions at Prudential Securities. In the mid-1990s he was head of its global equity transactions. In 1999 he moved from the head of its technology investment banking business to run PrudentialSecurities.com. He then transitioned to running the combined customer-facing internet services businesses of Prudential Financial.

Soon afterwards, Weild became the executive vice-president for corporate clients at NASDAQ., and subsequently its Vice Chairman.He left the position in July 2003 to become CEO of the National Research Exchange. He later founded Capital Markets Advisory Partners and simultaneously led the Capital Markets Group of Grant Thornton LLP. Capital Markets Advisory Partners was later renamed Weild & Co. Holdings.

In December 2002, he was elected as Chairman Emeritus of Tuesday’s Children, a charity organization supporting families affected by 9/11 and US military families that lost a family member.

== Writings and legislative efforts ==
=== Restructuring US stock markets ===
Weild became known nationally for his advocacy of changing the US laws applied to IPOs when he was interviewed for a 1994 cover story on the issue by Businessweek. Weild wrote articles on the subject for several international business newspapers over the years. In August 2010 he wrote about the equity market structure's systemic unfairness to small investors in an article for the Financial Times. In October 2011 he called also for a new stock market to support small companies in an op-ed run in The Wall Street Journal. He himself had overseen more than 1000 equity offerings during his career. His studies have also been cited by national magazines. In November 2009 The Economist wrote about stock market structure as a possible cause for the decline in the number of publicly listed companies, citing work published at Grant Thornton LLP by Weild.

In February 2012 he wrote for Crain's New York Magazine about rebuilding the IPO market for smaller firms, especially in the shadow of the failed Facebook IPO. A few months later, the US Congress passed legislation to improve IPO financing rules. Weild became known as the head of the New Markets Movement, pushing for an end to one-size-fits all stock markets. His efforts led The Wall Street Journal to call him the "Small-cap IPO evangelist". Weild also co-authored a section of the 2012 book Broken Markets by Financial Times Press, in which he made a direct link between the lower number of American IPOs and lowered job creation.

=== JOBS Act ===
On June 20, 2012 Weild provided testimony to the U.S. House of Representatives Financial Services Committee Capital Markets and Government Sponsored Entities Subcommittee's "hearing on market structure: Ensuring orderly, efficient, innovative and competitive markets for issuers and investors". He testified that inadequate tick sizes were damaging the ability of Wall Street to properly execute and support IPOs. SEC Advisory Committee on Small and Emerging Companies and US Congress in the effort of passing the April 5, 2012 Jumpstart Our Business Startups Act through the US government made hearings in November 2009 and June 2010. Weild continued to testify before the US government regarding their ineffective rules for dealing with small cap corporations. The JOBS Act was signed into law by the President in April 2012. The final bill relied heavily on studies done by Weild and coauthor Edward Kim. His efforts have led him to be known as the "Father" of the JOBS Act.

=== Further criticism of US IPO markets ===
Part of what Weild called for in 2012 was the potential founding of a new stock market that could handle the financing needs of small cap companies, and promote small businesses in the US. The goal for him is to grow the number of IPOs per year, by creating conditions that could suit the aftermarket support needs of companies smaller than those currently pursuing IPOs as a part of their business strategies. In changing the size of ticks, Weild has argued that fractions of stock prices is too hard to differentiate for a lot of investors, and that ticks could instead be measured in terms of pennies, nickels, dimes, or quarters, instead of simply pennies or fractions. Weild has stated that larger economic incentives to support small-capitalization stocks could buoy prices and liquidity leading to more IPOs and, thus, an acceleration in job creation. He has warned that the number of IPOs required per year to simply maintain historical numbers of publicly listed companies in the U.S. is at least 360, and that this number has not been met since 2000. A pilot program completed by FINRA and reported on July 3, 2018 found no support for this position. It found that in comparison to a control group quoting small cap stocks in nickels instead of pennies decreased trading, rather than increased it as predicted, and did not increase or even decreased the number of market makers for those stocks. Weild was unpersuaded by the results of the study, citing unspecified problems with the pilot. ""I'm 100% right," Weild said.

== Personal life ==
Weild is the brother of stage actress, director, and choreographer Kim Weild. He is married. His first child was born in 2001.
