= Groundfloor (company) =

American real estate company

GROUNDFLOOR Finance Inc.
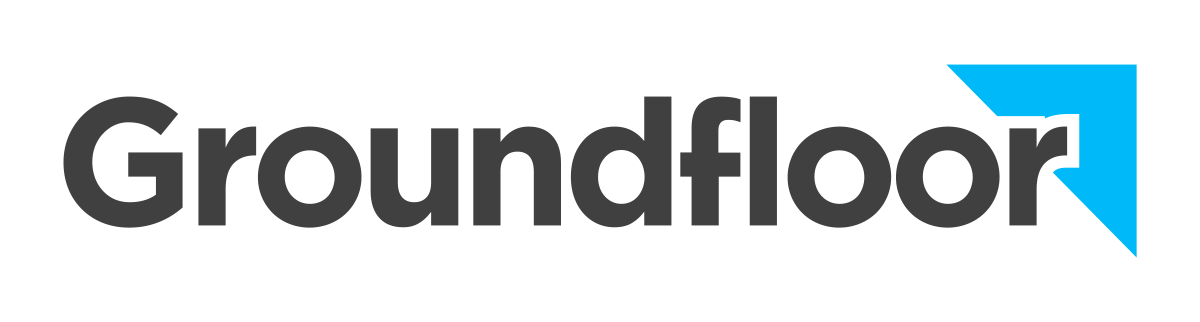
- Industry: Crowdfunded real estate investing
- Founded: 2013
- Founders: Brian Dally; Nick Bhargava
- Headquarters: Bank of America Plaza, Atlanta, Georgia, U.S.A.
- Key people: Brian Dally (CEO); Nick Bhargava (EVP)
- Services: Real estate peer-to-peer lending
- Number of employees: 102 (2022)
- Website: groundfloor.com

Groundfloor is an American real estate investing and lending marketplace. It was the first real estate crowdfunding company to achieve SEC qualification utilizing Regulation A+ after the regulation became operable through the JOBS Act.

== History ==
Groundfloor was founded in Raleigh, North Carolina, in February 2013 by Brian Dally (who launched Republic Wireless) and Nick Bhargava (contributor to the JOBS Act). In March 2014, the company raised $300,000 from angel investors in the region. After raising $1 million in seed funding, Groundfloor moved its headquarters to Atlanta because of the Invest Georgia Exemption (IGE) which allows state residents to invest in crowdfunded projects regardless of their investor accreditation status.

In August 2015, Groundfloor became the first real estate crowdfunding company to achieve SEC qualification under Regulation A+, since the regulation became operable through the JOBS Act. The company subsequently opened investing in California, Illinois, Maryland, Massachusetts, Texas, Virginia, Washington, Georgia and the District of Columbia in the fall of 2015. By late October, Groundfloor sold out every loan originally listed. By December, the company had funded 54 loans and sold more than $3 million in Limited Recourse Obligation securities. It also closed a $5 million Series A round, bringing its total financing to $7.5 million. The round was led by Fintech Ventures, a $100 million venture capital investment fund focused on innovation in non-bank lending, savings and smart payments, managed by Serguei Kouzmine. Groundfloor announced it would use the money to expand its business beyond the present nine states where it operates.

In 2017, Groundfloor originated $30 million in loans. By October 2018, the company had loaned more than $70 million across 500 properties in the United States, one third of which are in Atlanta. Following $4.2 million secured from 2304 investors during the 2017-18 campaign, as of October 2018 the company had fundraised $13.8 million. In 2019, Groundfloor closed another $3 million from 1,580 individual investors in a 2nd round.

== Platform ==
Groundfloor targets residential-development projects. They use a loan grading algorithm in addition to application review to assign a loan a letter grade and corresponding rate. Loan terms generally range from six to 12 months and financing can be in a senior or junior position.

== See also ==
- Disruptive innovation
