= Crowdfunding exemption movement =

Effort to exempt small investment offerings from some compliance requirements

The crowdfunding exemption movement in the U.S. is the effort to exempt relatively small investment offerings (typically $1 million or less), sold to the general public in small blocks, from the registration and compliance requirements demanded of large public companies. Inspired by the growth of non-investment crowdfunding, advocates see such exemptions as a way to spur innovation, economic activity, and small-business job creation, but opponents see such changes as invitations to fraud that will target unsophisticated investors. The movement has seen success with the passage of the Jumpstart Our Business Startups Act, which went into effect in 2016, and a growing number of state-level exemptions.

== History ==
The first big push towards an equity crowdfunding exemption came in April 2010, when Paul Spinrad of Make magazine, Jenny Kassan of the Sustainable Economies Law Center (SELC), and Danae Ringelmann of Indiegogo launched the Crowdfunding Campaign to Change Crowdfunding Law to fund the legal work to draft a petition to the U.S. Securities and Exchange Commission for a crowdfunding exemption. After the campaign met its funding goal, SELC interns Aroma Sharma and Kathleen Kenney researched and wrote the petition, which lists the names of all of its financial supporters in the first footnote. The SEC posted the petition as File No. 4-605 on July 1, 2010.

To limit abuse and protect investors, the SELC petition proposed a $100k cap on the entire offering, and a $100 cap on individual investments. Other crowdfunding exemption proposals followed the same two-cap strategy. The lobbying group Startup Exemption, led by Jason Best, Sherwood Neiss and Zak Cassady-Dorion, proposed crowdfunding exemption caps of $1m for the total offering and $10k or 10% of income for each individual investment to the SEC in December 2010, and in early 2011 to the Startup America initiative, which was launched by the White House to celebrate, inspire, and accelerate high-growth entrepreneurship throughout the nation. Sherwood Neiss was asked to testify twice in Congress. His congressional testimony reviewed the pros and cons of crowdfunding.

Through 2011, with the assistance of the Small Business and Entrepreneurship Council and a newsworthy endorsement from Whoopi Goldberg, the Startup Exemption met with members of Congress, White House staff, and others to lobby for a crowdfunding exemption. The Startup Exemption's $1m/$10k caps were repeated in the White House's first crowdfunding exemption endorsement, on Sept 8, 2011, and in the first crowdfunding bill, the Entrepreneur Access to Capital Act introduced by Rep. Patrick McHenry (R-NC) on September 14, 2011. As his initial inspiration for H.R.2930, McHenry points to the website BuyaBeerCompany.com, which launched in Nov 2009 and gathered over 5 million pledges for a notional group purchase of the Pabst Brewing Company before being shut down by the SEC.

The White House endorsed the Entrepreneur Access to Capital Act on November 1, 2011 and it passed the House the following day with a vote of 407-17. In the Senate, two new crowdfunding bills followed: S.1791, with caps of $1m and $1k, and S.1970, with a total offering cap of $1m, and a tiered individual cap ranging from $500 to 1% of income to 2% of income, depending on the investor's annual income. Around the same time, academic proposals for a crowdfunding exemption included a project cap of $250–500k and an individual cap of the greater of $500 or 2% of income, proposed by Steven Bradford, and $250k total and $1000 individual per six months, proposed by Nikki D. Pope.

The Entrepreneur Access to Capital Act, H.R.2930, became part of the JOBS Act in March 2012. The JOBS Act went through a number of amendments; the most significant of these was when the Senate replaced the H.R.2930 section with a version of S.1970 that was modified by raising its tiered individual investment caps to $2000, 5%, and 10% of income. On April 5, 2012, President Barack Obama signed the JOBS Act into law. The signing ceremony, in the White House Rose Garden, was attended by many members of the "crowdfunding crowd" that collectively lobbied for the exemption.

== Current status ==
Many states have enacted (or are in various stages of enacting/considering) their own intrastate crowdfunding exemption laws. As of July 2016, 31 states have intrastate crowdfunding exemptions in place and seven states are in various stages of enacting/considering sponsored legislation regarding such intrastate crowdfunding. To date only one state has reviewed, and rejected, an intrastate crowdfunding exemption. Based on available information to date, the remaining states do not appear to be investigating the possibility of enacting an intrastate crowdfunding exemption.

== Advantages and disadvantages ==
Intrastate crowdfunding exemptions provide issuers of securities with several advantages over the federal crowdfunding exemption found in the JOBS Act, Title III. First, for those companies residing in one of the states where an exemption has been put into place, securities based crowdfunding campaigns can be run today, without the need for businesses to wait on the SEC's rule making process. Second, the overall cost of capital associated with raising money under the JOBS Act crowdfunding exemption is estimated to be approximately $39,000 for a $100,000 crowdfunding campaign. Most of this cost is a consequence of the requirements for the issuers to have certified or audited financial statements, go through a FINRA registered broker/dealer or funding portal, and produce expensive disclosure materials for investors. By contrast, a similar capital raise under an intrastate exemption is likely to be significantly cheaper for a similar campaign as a result of the absence of many of these requirements at the state level.

The intrastate crowdfunding exemptions also carry certain disadvantages for companies wishing to run a crowdfunding campaign. Principally, companies must be domiciled in the state in which they wish to run the campaign, and may not offer securities to any potential investors who are located outside of such state. This restriction significantly curtails the potential audience that a crowdfunding campaign might reach. In addition, although the SEC has recently provided guidance on how issuers may protect themselves from making 'accidental offers' to residents that are not located within the issuer's state, compliance with the SEC Rule 147 (the intrastate exemption) can still be a technically challenging and legally difficult prospect.

== Operational platforms ==
Certain broad based and niche platforms are currently operating in the intrastate crowdfunding space as funding portals and crowdfunding consultants. Georgia was the first state to permit intrastate securities based crowdfunding through portals, and the first successful securities based crowdfunding transaction in the United States in over 80 years, was posted on the Georgia intrastate only platform SparkMarket in October 2013. The campaign—run by Georgia-based Bohemian Guitars—raised approximately $129,000. Georgia currently has several operational general and market niche platforms.

The first successful intrastate crowdfunding campaign pursuant to the Michigan Invests Locally Act (the MILE Act) was run by the Tecumseh Brewing Co., and was successfully closed at $175,000, in May 2014, on the multi-state platform Localstake.

Under the Illinois Intrastate Offering Exemption the Secretary of State has approved the application of VestLo as a registered crowdfunding portal effective August 2016. However, the site appears to be inactive as of May 2019.

New Jersey's first Crowdfunding Platform (www.CrowdFundingNJ.com) went live in April 2018. Intrastate Crowdfunding works well as a first step for companies raising funding—most investors at this level are local to the business anyway—think of as a Friends & Family II (FF2) round.
