= CrowdsUnite =

- Website type: Crowdfunding Review Site
- Headquarters: New York City, New York State, U.S.
- Founder: Alex Feldman
- Website: crowdsunite.com
- Launched: 2012
- Current status: Active

CrowdsUnite is a website intended to serve as a review site for online funding platforms. It provides user reviews of crowdfunding sites which can be helpful for business owners who find it difficult to select from the many options. The site was created to adapt to the growing popularity of crowdfunding, which has captured the attention of cable TV producers and prominent figures. CEO Alex Feldman stated that he is "trying to become a Yelp for the crowdfunding industry, a resource that anybody can use."

== History ==
CrowdsUnite was launched in 2012 after the U.S. JOBS Act was passed. The founder, Alex Feldman, is a graduate of New York University (NYU) with an MBA in Finance, Entrepreneurship and a BS in computer science and mathematics.

== Crowdfunding ==
CrowdsUnite has reviewed a comprehensive list of platforms, including Kickstarter, Indiegogo, and RocketHub. It has been called an "Amazon for crowdfunding platforms". CrowdsUnite recently released an infographic, showing the top ten crowdfunding platforms based on its reviews. Some of the reviewed crowd funding sites had only 10 reviews while others had more, which may have affected the data.

== Business model ==
Feldman claims that CrowdsUnite exists to offer transparency to the platforms. He also stated that the website itself is designed to be simple, direct, and clean so that anyone can use it.

There is a listing of crowdfunding consultants and companies including accountants, attorneys, videographers, marketers, and fulfillment centers.

== Reception ==
Created in the wake of the financial crisis, CrowdsUnite has enjoyed a positive response and interest from industry leaders and support from New York's Soho Loft, an organization that host events pertaining to business and finance.
