= Campaign finance in the United States =

Contributions to American election campaign funds

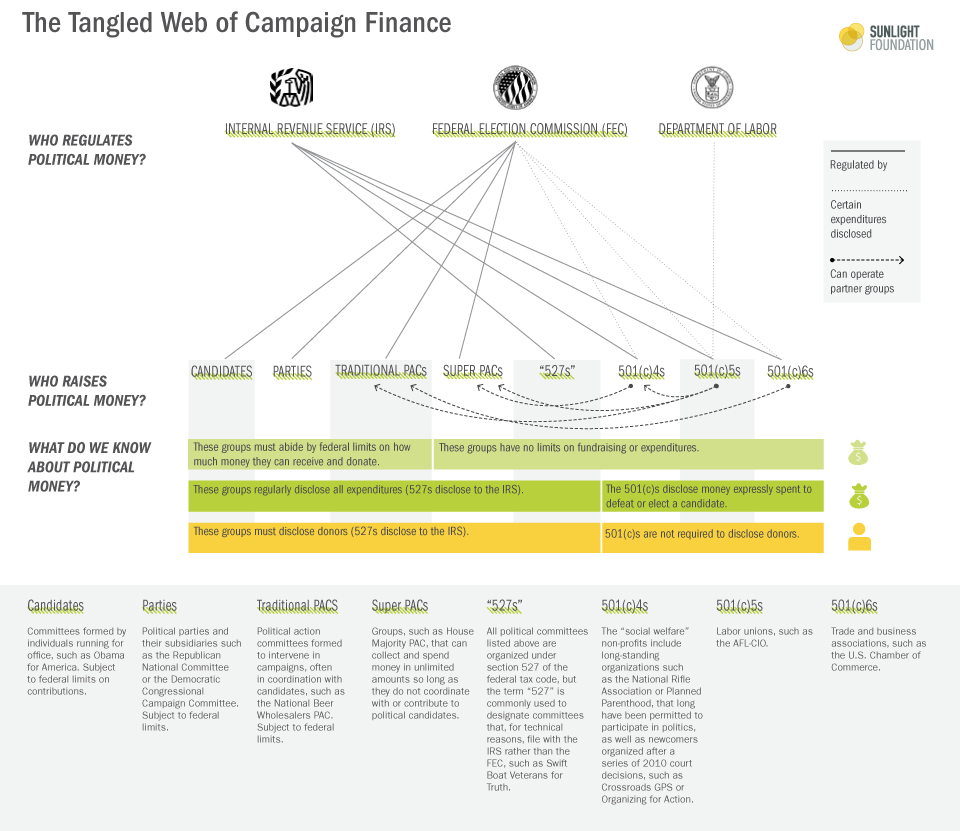
Diagram by the Sunlight Foundation depicting the American campaign finance system

The financing of electoral campaigns in the United States happens at the federal, state, and local levels by contributions from individuals, corporations, political action committees, and sometimes the government. Campaign spending has risen steadily at least since 1990. For example, a candidate who won an election to the U.S. House of Representatives in 1990 spent on average $407,600 ($1 million in 2025) while the winner in 2022 spent on average $2.79 million ($3.07 million in 2025); in the Senate, average spending for winning candidates went from $3.87 million ($9.54 million in 2025) to $26.53 million ($29.19 million in 2025).

In 2020, nearly $14 billion was spent on federal election campaigns in the United States, "making it the most expensive campaign in U.S. history", "more than double" what was spent in the 2016 election. Critics assert that following a number of Supreme Court decisions — Citizens United v. FEC (2010) in particular—the "very wealthy" are now allowed to spend unlimited amounts on campaigns (through Political Action Committees, especially "Super PACs"), and to prevent voters from knowing who is trying to influence them (contributing "dark money" that masks the donor's identity). Consequently, as of at least 2022, critics (such as the Brennan Center for Justice) allege "big money dominates U.S. political campaigns to a degree not seen in decades" and is "drowning out the voices of ordinary Americans."

On December 6, 2024, The Washington Post reported that Elon Musk had donated $277 million to Trump and allied Republicans, making him the single largest individual political donor in the 2024 election and the largest donor since at least 2010, not counting candidates who funded their own campaigns, according to data from OpenSecrets. As Senator Angus King pointed out, “It used to be, ‘If you buck us, we will primary you.’ Now, ‘If you buck us, we will primary you and Musk will pay for it.’ So it’s a double-barreled threat […] We’re talking about him putting $100 million against you in a primary.”

Public concern over the influence of large donors in political campaigns was reflected in a 2018 opinion poll which found that 74% of Americans surveyed thought it was "very" important that "people who give a lot of money to elected officials" "not have more political influence than other people", (Note: 90% of Americans surveyed thought it was "very" or "somewhat" important) but that 72% thought this was "not at all" or "not too" much the case. Another 65% of respondents agreed that it should not be impossible to change this and that "new laws could be written that would be effective in reducing the role of money in politics".

Laws regulating campaign donations, spending and public funding have been enacted at the federal level by the Congress and enforced by the Federal Election Commission (FEC), an independent federal agency. Nonprofit, non-governmental grassroots organizations like the Center for Responsive Politics, Consumer Watchdog and Common Cause track how money is raised and spent. Although most campaign spending is privately financed (largely through donors that work in subsidized industries), public financing is available for qualifying candidates for President of the United States during both the primaries and the general election. Eligibility requirements must be fulfilled to qualify for a government subsidy, and those that do accept government funding are usually subject to spending limits on money.

Races for non-federal offices are governed by state and local law. Over half the states allow some level of corporate and union contributions. As of 2021, some states have stricter limits on contributions, while some states have no limits at all. Much information from campaign spending comes from the federal campaign database which does not include state and local campaign spending.

== Terminology, definitions ==
- Campaign funds: legally defined by the Federal Election Campaign Act as funds "used for purposes in connection with the campaign to influence the federal election of the candidate" (see below).
- Dark money: spending to influence elections where the source of the money is not disclosed to voters (see below).
- Soft money: money that is not supposed to "advocate the election or defeat of a federal candidate", but instead to be used for "state and local elections and generic 'party-building' activities, including voter registration campaigns and get-out-the-vote drives". Unlike hard money, there are "no federal contribution limits" on it (see below).
- Hard money: "regulated contributions (see below) "from an individual or PAC to a federal candidate, party committee or other PAC, where the money is used for a federal election"

== Campaign spending ==
Money spent on campaigns in the 21st century has risen somewhat faster than inflation over time.

Total cost of federal elections, congressional and presidential (1998-2024)
(In billions of dollars, adjusted for inflation. Source: OpenSecrets)

- Congressional race
- Presidential race

Over the decades, this has risen much faster. Jane Mayer notes that in 1972, a $2 million dollar political donation by an insurance magnate (by W. Clement Stone to Richard M. Nixon) "caused public outrage and contributed to a movement that produced the post-Watergate reforms in campaign financing". But the sum that "was considered deeply corrupt during the Watergate days" was worth about $11 million adjusted for inflation by 2016, when the Koch brothers political network bundled $889 million for a "political war chest" for that year's election.

2022

An estimated $16.7 billion was spent on the 2021 and 2022 election cycle, exceeding that of the last mid-term election. According to Open Secrets, of the 25 top donors for the 2021-2022 cycle, 18 are Republican, who have outspent Democrats by $200 million, and much of the Democrats' money was not disbursed. In the 2022 Congressional races, the sources of campaign contributions broke down as follows: (Note: OpenSecrets provides a breakdown of spending for presidential and congressional campaigns for federal elections from 1990-2022.)

2022 congressional races	Small individual contributors	Large individual contributors	Political action committees	Self-financing
House Democrats	19.4%	52.5%	23.4%	2.0%
House Republicans	20.9%	42%	23.1%	0.8%
Senate Democrats	27.5%	59.3%	8.9%	0.0%
Senate Republicans	35.1%	45.7%	11.2%	0.1%

2024

An estimated $15.9 billion was spent on the 2024 election cycle, the second costliest U.S. election after the 2020 election. Of this $15.9 billion, $10.2 billion was spent on congressional races while $5.5 billion was spent on the presidential race. (Note: 2020 In 2020, $14.4 billion was spent on federal election campaigns — $5.7 billion for the presidential election and $8.7 billion for congressional races—according to Open Secrets.org. Democrats outspent Republicans in races for both branches of government. The percentage of fundraising from PACs in 2020, fell to 4% of all spending (from 9% in the last presidential election cycle), but "outside spending" (i.e. political expenditures made by groups or individuals supposedly independently of, and not coordinated with, candidates' committees, which includes super PACs and 501(c) "dark money" organizations), came to almost $3.3 billion, nearly doubling the 2016 number. Small contributions rose (from 15.2% to 22.9%) but were still less in total than large individual donations (42.59%). The percentage of really large donations to political committees, i.e. from the top 100 donors, came to $1.6 billion in 2020. 2016 In the 2016 election campaign, $5.1 billion was spent in congressional races, and $2.9 billion was spent in the presidential campaign. 2010 In the 2010 midterm election cycle, candidates for office, political parties, and independent groups spent a total of $3.6 billion on federal elections. The average winner of a seat in the House of Representatives spent $1.4 million on their campaign. The average winner of a Senate seat spent $9.8 million. 2008 In 2008, candidates for office, political parties, and independent groups spent a total of $5.3 billion on federal elections. The amount spent on the presidential race alone was $2.4 billion, and over $1 billion of that was spent by the campaigns of the two major candidates: Barack Obama spent $730 million in his election campaign, and John McCain spent $333 million. The total amount spent by Obama and McCain was a record at the time.)

== Impact of contributions ==
=== Impact on recipients ===
A 2016 experimental study in the American Journal of Political Science found that politicians made themselves more available for meetings with individuals when they believed that the individuals had donated to their campaign. A 2011 study found that "even after controlling for past contracts and other factors, companies that contributed more money to federal candidates subsequently received more contracts." A 2016 study in the Journal of Politics found that industries overseen by committees decreased their contributions to congresspeople who recently departed from the committees and that they immediately increase their contributions to new members of the committees, which is "evidence that corporations and business PACs use donations to acquire immediate access and favor—suggesting they at least anticipate that the donations will influence policy." Research published in 2020 by University of Chicago political scientist Anthony Fowler and Northwestern University political scientists Haritz Garro and Jörg L. Spenkuch found no evidence that corporations that donated to a candidate received any monetary benefits from the candidate winning election.

However, another study found that increasing lobbying reduces a corporation's effective tax rate, with an increase of 1% in lobbying expenditures expected to reduce a corporation's next-year tax rate between 0.5 and 1.6%. Another study based on data from 48 different states found that every $1 "invested" in corporate campaign contribution is worth $6.65 in lower state corporate taxes.

=== Impact on electoral success ===
At least according to one academic (Geoffrey Cowan, Annenberg family chair for communication leadership at USC), campaign spending does not correlate with electoral victory. "You have to have enough, but it doesn't have to be the most." It has been suggested that Donald Trump's victory over well-financed opponents was an example of the limits of money in politics. However, comparing electoral success with who spent the most running for congress, OpenSecrets found that while "money doesn't always equal victory... it usually does."

Percent of races won by top-spending candidate for U.S. House and Senate

- House of Representatives
- Senate

This may be because donors give to candidates who are "already viewed as being much stronger" than their opponent to ingratiate themselves with what looks like the winner, but also because money going to a less well-known candidate has the intended effect and results in their winning. "Even in wave elections, the candidate who spends the most, usually wins. This trend is stronger in the House than the Senate but applies in both chambers".

=== State level ===
A 2012 study by Lynda Powell examined "subtle and not-so-subtle ways in which money buys influence" in state legislatures. They varied "from setting a party's agenda, to keeping bills off the floor, to adding earmarks and crafting key language in legislation", but did not often include voting yes or no on particular legislation. She found that political money "carries more weight" in states with "more highly compensated legislators, larger chambers, and more professionalized leadership structures", where the "majority party's advantage is tightly contested and whose legislators are more likely to hold hopes of running for higher office"; less weight where legislatures have term limits and voters are more highly educated.

According to the New York Times however, "several scholars" state that studies "comparing states like Virginia with scant regulation" on political contributions, against those like Wisconsin with "strict rules" have "not found much difference in levels of corruption or public trust".

== Criticism ==
Reasons offered for why "big money" in politics (campaign contributions and high level lobbying from corporations and the wealthy) should be regulated include: it

- "results in corruption"; (i.e., “quid pro quo corruption”, or bribery);
- harms trust in government;
- decreases public interest in public affairs and government;
- gives powerful corporations and wealthy individuals leverage to not just express their political views or support for a candidate, but to "reshape the American economy in their favor", favoring lower taxes and smaller government over public spending to improve policing, public schools, environmental protection, and employment opportunities.
- wastes economic resources on "rent-seeking," as players in the private sector spend time and money "trying to get a bigger piece of the economic pie for themselves" (in the form of tax cuts, subsidies, cuts in regulation and other special favors that the elected officials they donate to can provide), instead of focusing on enlarging the pie itself (with "productive economic activity" such as new inventions and better, cheaper goods and services).

=== Solutions/reforms ===
- Public financing. A traditional solution offered to dilute the power of a few donors giving large political contributions was to put limits on campaign spending. Following court rulings such as Citizens United v. FEC, putting an end to some of these limits, reformers such as The Brennan Center for Justice have suggested encouraging "small donor public financing", by using public funds to match and multiply small donations" (see below).

Other proposals for "fixing" the influence of money in politics in the United States made by at least one reform group (the Brennan Center) include:

- Fully disclose all political spending. As of 2018, disclosure laws "fail to regulate political advertising on the internet create the potential for a massive increase in undisclosed online spending". In state and local elections, where there is much less political money, "a dark money expenditure as low as $100,000, or even $10,000 — pocket change for special interests — can easily dominate an election".
- Close fundraising loopholes for candidates and officeholders. Super PACs, can raise and spend unlimited amounts of money in support of candidates, but are supposed to be "independent" of those candidates. In fact "many super PACs were run by candidates’ top aides" or close associates". "Politicians fundraised prominently for their “independent” groups and even appeared in their ads. In addition, "a new breed of tax-exempt nonprofits has proliferated, boosting politicians — and their policies — while in office." They "raise unlimited, undisclosed funds". Brennan suggests "no more appearances by candidates at 'independent' fundraisers", and "a cooling off period before advisers jump to super PAC staff, and so on".
- Reform the Federal Election Commission. In 2016, panel votes on enforcement matters deadlocked roughly 1 time in 3, "according to former FEC Commissioner Ann Ravel, "10 times more often than a decade ago. In 2016, the agency levied less than $600,000 in penalties, a 90 percent drop over the same time." Brennan suggests adding another (non-partisan) commissioner to end the evenly balanced bipartisan structure, and giving the commission a chief administrative officer for a fixed term of four to six years, etc.

==== Criticism of solutions ====
At least many conservatives such as former Secretary of Education Betsy DeVos and James Bopp of The Heritage Foundation, maintain legal restrictions on money in politics are an unjust restriction on free speech that should be opposed as a matter of principle. Bopp writes that "there may be too little money spent during political campaigns, not too much", because government is larger and more powerful than it should be, and at least often agree that campaign finance reform limiting spending on political campaigns is an unconstitutional limit on "citizens' freedom of speech and association". DeVos compares restrictions on campaign finance to the tyranny of 1984's "Big Brother", and defends the use of money to buy political influence in the service of conservative governance and "traditional American virtues".

On a more practical level, contrarians (David Primo and Jeffrey Milyo) argue that the public has been deceived by "the incessant message" propagated by 'the media, politicians, reform groups, and scholars", that money in politics is bad. In fact this public disapproval comes from Americans being fed up with politics in general and money is actually "just a convenient bugaboo". Furthermore, many things the public believes about corruption in politics are not true. Experts on campaign finance are much less cynical than the public about the nefarious influence of money in politics. "Legal scholars and social scientists say the evidence is meager, at best, that the post-Watergate campaign finance system has accomplished the broad goals its supporters asserted."

Political scientist Kenneth Mayer also agrees that, when looking at those 1970s reforms,

there is no evidence that stricter campaign finance rules reduce corruption or raise positive assessments of government. It seems like such an obvious relationship but it has proven impossible to prove.

== Sources of campaign funding ==
Candidates are not the only ones raising and spending more money. Political parties are also raising much more money in elections, which they donate to candidates, spend on behalf of candidates, and use to mobilize voters, among other things. In the 1992 electoral cycle, the Republican and Democratic parties combined raised roughly $650 million. In the 2020 cycle, they raised almost $2.7 billion

=== Funding categories ===
The money for campaigns for federal office is divided into four broad categories of sources:

- small individual contributors (defined by the government as being from individuals who contribute $200 or less)
- large individual contributors (individuals who contribute more than $200)
- political action committees
- self-financing (the candidate's own money)

=== Super wealthy donors ===
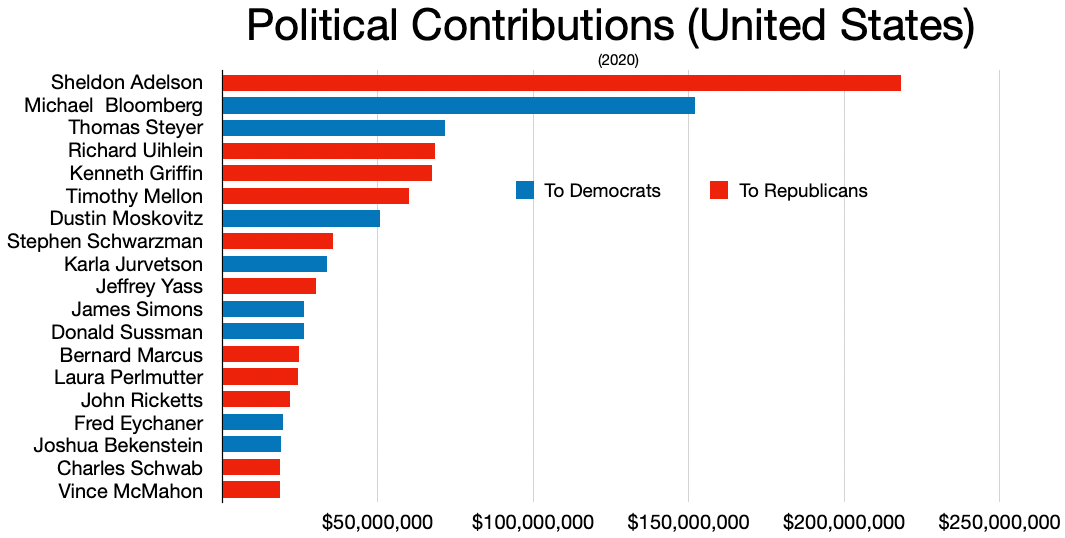
Political donations by major donors

Political donations from the growing number of billionaires and their immediate families has increased dramatically since 2004, with Republicans receiving a sharp increase in 2024 compared to Democrats.

Money from billionaires and other super wealthy people comprises a disproportionate share of campaign financing in the United States. Examining one slice of the campaigning season—Summer 2015 of the 2016 presidential campaign cycle—the donations of fewer than 400 super wealthy families comprised nearly half of all publicly disclosed presidential campaign financing, according to a New York Times analysis of FEC and Internal Revenue Service (IRS) filings. These donors exploit the SuperPAC loophole, which bypasses the traditional donation maximum for an individual in any year. On the Republican side, just around 130 particularly rich families accounted for more than half of the publicly disclosed presidential candidate campaign financing. For several major Republican presidential candidates, a handful of donors and their businesses accounted for most of the donations to the candidate.

A 2017 study found that "only a small portion of Americans make campaign donations" and that both Democratic and Republican donors "are more ideologically extreme than other partisans, including primary voters. With respect to why individuals contribute, we show that donors appear responsive to their perception of the stakes in the election."

Another 2017 study found that relatively unpopular industries (which, depending on the political situation, may include fossil fuels, banking, etc.) provide larger contributions to candidates. The authors of the study argue that this is because candidates lose voter support when they are associated with unpopular industries and that the industries therefore provide larger contributions to compensate for this loss of support.

A 2022 study found that billionaires are increasingly using their personal wealth and that of corporations they control to, "drown out regular voters' voices and elect hand-picked candidates who further rig the nation's economy — especially the tax system." These findings comport with a 2015 report from Northwestern University researchers who found that 82% of U.S. billionaires made financial contributions to political parties or candidates and a third of them "bundled" contributions from others, hosted political fundraisers, or both, focusing primarily on issues of taxes or Social Security, "overwhelmingly, for example, toward repealing the estate tax, reducing capital gains and personal and corporate income taxes, and opposing carbon taxes."

=== Federal contribution limits ===
Federal law does not allow corporations and labor unions to donate money directly to candidates ("hard money") or national party committees. It also limits how much money (a) individuals and (b) organizations involved in political action may contribute to political campaigns, political parties, and other FEC-regulated organizations.

Donors	Recipients				
Donors	Candidate committee	PAC (Note: "PAC" here refers to a committee that makes contributions to other federal political committees. Independent-expenditure-only political committees (sometimes called "Super PACs") may accept unlimited contributions, including from corporations and labor organizations.) (SSF and nonconnected)	State/district/local party committee	National party committee	Additional national party committee accounts (Note: The limits in this column apply to a national party committee's accounts for: (i) the presidential nominating convention; (ii) election recounts and contests and other legal proceedings; and (iii) national party headquarters buildings. A party's national committee, Senate campaign committee and House campaign committee are each considered separate national party committees with separate limits. Only a national party committee, not the parties' national congressional campaign committees, may have an account for the presidential nominating convention.)
Individual	$3,000 (Note: Indexed for inflation in odd-numbered years.) per election	$5,000 per year	$10,000 per year (combined)	$35,500 per year	$106,500 per account, per year
Candidate committee	$2,000 per election	$5,000 per year	Unlimited transfers		
PAC—multicandidate	$5,000 per election	$5,000 per year	$5,000 per year (combined)	$15,000 per year	$45,000 per account, per year
PAC—nonmulticandidate	$2,800 per election	$5,000 per year	$10,000 per year (combined)	$35,500 per year	$106,500 per account, per year
State, district & local party committee	$5,000 per election	$5,000 per year	Unlimited transfers		
National Party Committee	$5,000 per election (Note: Additionally, a national party committee and its senatorial campaign committee may contribute up to $46,800 combined per campaign to each Senate candidate.)	$5,000 per year	Unlimited transfers		
Source: FEC

Table footnotes

=== State and local contribution regulations ===
Election campaigns for non-federal offices are governed by state and local law, and contributions for these campaigns are not found in the federal campaign database. As of 2021, over half the states allow some level of corporate and union contributions, often the same as those for individual contributors (i.e. lower than the national limits), while several states (Alabama, Indiana, Iowa, Nebraska, Oregon, Pennsylvania, Texas, Utah and Virginia) have no limits at all.

=== Bundling ===
One consequence of the limitation upon personal contributions from any one individual is that campaigns seek out "bundlers"—people who can gather contributions from many individuals in an organization or community and present the sum to the campaign. Campaigns often recognize these bundlers with honorary titles and, in some cases, exclusive events featuring the candidate.

Although bundling existed in various forms since the enactment of the FECA, bundling became organized in a more structured way in the 2000s, spearheaded by the "Bush Pioneers" for George W. Bush's 2000 and 2004 presidential campaigns. During the 2008 campaign the six leading primary candidates (three Democratic, three Republican) listed a total of nearly two thousand bundlers.

There has been extensive criticism that US presidents have rewarded bundlers with political appointment, most notably ambassador positions where nominees have no qualifications for appointment.

=== Advocacy groups/interest groups ===
Lobbyists often assist congressional campaign finance by arranging fundraisers, assembling PACs, and seeking donations from other clients. Many lobbyists become campaign treasurers and fundraisers for congresspersons.

=== "Soft" money/independent expenditure ===
Contributions made directly to a specific candidate are called "hard money" and those made to parties and committees "for party building in general rather than for specific candidates" are called "soft money" or "independent spending". Following a couple of 2010 court decisions (Citizens United v. FEC and SpeechNOW.org v. FEC, see below), soft money political spending was exempt from federal limits, creating what some have called "a major loophole" in federal campaign financing and spending law. There are no limits on soft money and some examples are donations for stickers, posters, and television and radio spots supporting a particular party platform or idea but not a concrete candidate. Soft money contributions may be spent on registering and mobilizing voters, just not on expressed advocacy for a particular candidate.

The reasoning behind the court decisions was that independent/soft spending would not result in corruption since the candidate would not be indebted to the independent contributor, and that those independent expenditures would "be visible to the public" who would then know "whether elected officials are 'in the pocket' of so-called moneyed interests", since "with the advent of the Internet, prompt disclosure of expenditures" would be easier than ever (quoting Justice Anthony Kennedy). This has been criticized as "naive". Critics have noted that independent expenditure can be and have been closely coordinated with political campaigns, and that soft money began "flooding into elections" via "social welfare" groups that "claimed the right to spend on elections without disclosing their donors."

The key factor is whether an ad uses words like or similar to "vote for" or not. Most of such donations received by state party committees are then sent to the national party headquarters to spend as they please, including on political campaigns by candidates. Critics call this a legalized form of political "money laundering".

Another form of soft money is political spending by "independent expenditure committees", commonly known as "super PACs," which are allowed to raise and spend unlimited amounts of money to advocate for or against any candidate(s) or issues, as long as there is no coordination, consultation or request by any campaign or candidate. Such donations in presidential elections amount to hundreds of millions of dollars. There are three main legal categories of independent groups:

- independent expenditure committees,
- 527 organizations, and
- 501(c) organizations.

These groups are more active in American politics than ever before, as in 2016, more than $2.3 billion was raised between the Democratic and Republican National Committees. For the amounts of soft money contributed in recent years and the legislation that enabled this, see the section on the Bipartisan Campaign Reform Act.

== Spending by outside organizations/independent expenditures ==
Organizations other than individual candidates and their campaigns also contribute to election spending. These organizations can donate money to political campaigns (according to the limits described above), but in addition they can spend money directly to influence elections in what are known as "independent expenditures".

All outside groups that aren't political parties — except for a few traditional PACs that make independent expenditures — are allowed to accept unlimited sums of money from individuals, corporations or unions.

=== Political action committees ===
Federal law allows for multiple types of political action committees (PACs).

- Connected PACs: The Federal Election Campaign Act prohibits corporations and labor unions from making direct contributions or expenditures in connection with federal elections. These organizations may, however, sponsor a "separate segregated fund" (SSF), known as a "connected PAC". These PACs may receive and raise money only from a "restricted class", generally consisting of managers and shareholders in the case of a corporation and members in the case of a union or other interest group. In exchange, the sponsor of the PAC may absorb all the administrative costs of operating the PAC and soliciting contributions. As of January 2009, there were 1,598 registered corporate PACs, 272 related to labor unions and 995 to trade organizations.
- Nonconnected PACs: A nonconnected PAC is financially independent, meaning that it must pay for its own administrative expenses using the contributions it raises. Although an organization may financially support a nonconnected PAC, these expenditures are considered contributions to the PAC and are subject to the dollar limits and other requirements of the Act.
- Leadership PACs: Elected officials and political parties cannot give more than the federal limit directly to candidates. However, they can set up a leadership PAC that makes independent expenditures. Provided the expenditure is not coordinated with the other candidate, this type of spending is not limited. Under the FEC rules, leadership PACs are non-connected PACs, and can accept donations from individuals and other PACs. Since current officeholders have an easier time attracting contributions, leadership PACs are a way dominant parties can capture seats from other parties. A leadership PAC sponsored by an elected official cannot use funds to support that official's own campaign. However, it may fund travel, administrative expenses, consultants, polling, and other non-campaign expenses. (Note: Money that has been funneled into PACS has been on the rise. Congressional PACS went from raising 131 million dollars in 1978 to 466 million dollars in 2018 (Sides et al 2018). Even though people think that the majority of spending during a political campaign comes from PACS the data shows otherwise. In the 2016 election cycle individual donations to candidates made up 52 percent of funds raised by House candidates compared to the 32 percent that PACS raised (Side et al 2018). This goes directly against the media narrative that PACS hold the power when it comes to election cycle spending. In the 2018 election cycle, leadership PACs donated more than $67 million to federal candidates.)
- "Super PACs": Super PACs are unlike other PACs, in that they have no legal limit to the funds they can raise from individuals, corporations, unions and other groups, provided they are operated correctly. They are officially known as "independent-expenditure only committees", because they may not make contributions to candidate campaigns or parties, but rather must do any political spending independently of the campaigns. While super PACs are legally required to disclose their donors, some of these groups are effectively dark money outlets when the bulk of their funding cannot be traced back to the original donor. In the 2019-2020 election cycle, there were 2,415 groups organized as super PACs; their receipts reportedly totaled a little over $2.5 billion and independent expenditures totaled of a little under $1.3 billion. Super PACs first arose in the 2010 election. Super PACs were made possible by two judicial decisions. First, in January 2010 the U.S. Supreme Court held in Citizens United v. Federal Election Commission that government may not prohibit unions and corporations from making independent expenditure for political purposes. Two months later, in Speechnow.org v. FEC, the Federal Court of Appeals for the D.C. Circuit held that contributions to groups that only make independent expenditures could not be limited in the size and source of contributions to the group. Independent expenditures continue to grow with $17 million spent in 2002 on congressional elections, $52 million in 2006, and $290 million in 2010. In 10 states independent spending amounted to 19% of the total amount of money contributed to candidates between 2005 and 2010. In three of those states independent spending was greater than 25% of the contributions given to candidates. Critics (such as journalist Matea Gold, Representative David E. Price) have complained that Super PACs have found "creative ways to work in concert" with the candidates and FEC regulation of them is nominal.
- Hybrid PAC: A hybrid PAC (sometimes called a Carey Committee) is similar to a Super PAC, but can give limited amounts of money directly to campaigns and committees, while still making independent expenditures in unlimited amounts.

=== 501(c) organizations ===
501(c)(4) "social welfare", 501(c)(5) "labor unions", 501(c)(6) "chambers of commerce" unlike 501(c)(3) charitable organizations can participate in political campaigns and elections, as long as the organization's "primary purpose" is issue advocacy and not political advocacy and are not required to disclose their donors publicly.[31]. This aspect of the law has led to extensive use of 501(c)(4) organizations in raising and donating money for political activity.[32] The NAACP, Planned Parenthood, Sierra Club, and National Rifle Association are well known examples of organizations that operate 501(c)(4) social welfare organizations that engage in political advocacy.

=== 527 organizations ===
A 527 organization or 527 group is a type of American tax-exempt organization named after "Section 527" of the U.S. Internal Revenue Code. Technically, almost all political committees, including state, local, and federal candidate committees, traditional political action committees, "Super PACs", and political parties are "527s." However, in common practice the term is usually applied only to such organizations that are not regulated under state or federal campaign finance laws because they do not "expressly advocate" for the election or defeat of a candidate or party. When operated within the law, there are no upper limits on contributions to 527s and no restrictions on who may contribute. There are no spending limits imposed on these organizations. However, they must register with the IRS, publicly disclose their donors and file periodic reports of contributions and expenditures.

=== Political parties ===
Political party committees may contribute funds directly to candidates, subject to the contribution limits listed above. National and state party committees may make additional "coordinated expenditures," subject to limits, to help their nominees in general elections. National party committees may also make unlimited "independent expenditures" to support or oppose federal candidates. However, since 2002, national parties have been prohibited from accepting any funds outside the limits established for elections in the FECA.

== Disclosure rules ==
Campaign finance law at the federal level requires candidate committees, party committees, and PACs to file periodic reports disclosing the money they raise and spend. Federal candidate committees must identify, for example, all PACs and party committees that give them contributions, and they must provide the names, occupations, employers and addresses of all individuals who give them more than $200 in an election cycle. Additionally, they must disclose expenditures to any individual or vendor. The Federal Election Commission maintains this database and publishes the information about campaigns and donors on its website. (Similar reporting requirements exist in many states for state and local candidates and for PACs and party committees.) There are extensive loopholes in campaign finance disclosure rules.

Various organizations, including OpenSecrets, aggregate data on political contributions to provide insight into the influence of various groups. In August 2014, a new smartphone app called "Buypartisan" was released to allow consumers to scan the barcodes of items in grocery stores and see where that corporation and its leaders directed their political contributions.

=== "Dark money" exception ===
A major loophole to disclosure requirements is "dark money," so named because while the recipient knows the identity of those giving them money, the public knows neither the identity of the campaigns, candidates nor other entities receiving the money, nor the amounts raised and spent, as these are exempt from disclosure requirements. In the 2020 election, more than $1 billion in “dark money” was spent at the federal level:

- $660 million came from "opaque political nonprofits and shell companies" and went to "outside" groups;
- $170 million was spent on TV advertising;
- 132 million on digital advertising;
- $88 million in direct election spending was reported to the Federal Election Commission by politically active nonprofits.

(While for many years dark money "overwhelmingly boosting Republicans", in the 2020 presidential election cycle dark money benefited Democrats.)

Money donated by trade association groups and not-for-profit corporations, which are allowed to raise unlimited amounts from corporations and individuals, and to spend unlimited amounts any way they wish. The amount of dark money raised and spent has been increasing very rapidly each election cycle in recent years in both state and federal elections, to the point that it now amounts to hundreds of millions of dollars in U.S. presidential elections.

== History of campaign finance in the United States ==
Andrew Jackson was one of the first American politicians to use what are now conventional campaign techniques of using campaign staffers to help him raise money and secure votes and campaign committees to organize rallies and parades.

According to Bryant and McManus, the "first federal campaign finance law" came after the Civil War—the Navy Appropriations Bill of 1867, which prohibited government employees from soliciting contributions from Navy yard workers. Wealthy and notable families such as the Astors and Vanderbilts realized they had much to gain by supporting politicians election campaigns.

Secret campaign donations from newly rich oil, steel, finance and railroad magnates in the late 19th and early 20th century created a "series of campaign scandals". Mark Hanna raised money for William McKinley's election in 1896 and 1900 from Rockefeller's Standard Oil.

=== Early attempts at regulating money in campaigns ===
A backlash grew against this influence. In 1905, Teddy Roosevelt unsuccessfully attempted to get Congress to outlaw all corporate political contributions.

==== Tillman Act of 1907 ====
Named for its sponsor, South Carolina Senator Ben Tillman, the Tillman Act of 1907 prohibited corporations and nationally chartered (interstate) banks from making direct financial contributions to federal candidates. However, weak enforcement mechanisms made the Act ineffective. Disclosure requirements and spending limits for House and Senate candidates followed in 1910 and 1911. General contribution limits were enacted in the Federal Corrupt Practices Act (1925). An amendment to the Hatch Act of 1939 set an annual ceiling of $3 million for political parties' campaign expenditures and $5,000 for individual campaign contributions. The Smith–Connally Act (1943) and Taft–Hartley Act (1947) extended the corporate ban to labor unions.

=== Federal Election Campaign Act (1971) ===
In 1971, Congress passed the Federal Election Campaign Act (FECA), instituting various campaign finance disclosure requirements for federal candidates (those running for the House, the Senate, the President and the Vice President), political parties, and political action committees. In 1974, Congress passed amendments to the FECA establishing a comprehensive system of regulation and enforcement, including public financing of presidential campaigns and the creation of a central enforcement agency, the Federal Election Commission. The new regulations included limits on campaign finance, including caps on (1) individual contributions to candidates, (2) contributions to candidates by "political committees" (commonly known as Political Action Committees, or PACs), (3) total campaign expenditures, and (4) independent expenditures by individuals and groups "relative to a clearly identified candidate."

=== Buckley v. Valeo (1976) ===
The constitutionality of the FECA was challenged in the U.S. Supreme Court case Buckley v. Valeo (1976). In Buckley, the Court upheld the Act's limits on individual contributions, as well as the disclosure and reporting provisions and the public financing scheme. The Court held that limitations on donations to candidates were constitutional because of the compelling state interest in preventing corruption or the appearance of corruption. However, the Court also held that caps on the amount campaigns could spend and caps on independent expenditures were an unconstitutional abridgment of free speech under the First Amendment. In addition, Buckley also held that the disclosure and reporting requirements of FECA could only apply to expenditures authorized or requested by a candidate or expenditures for communications that "expressly advocate the election or defeat of a clearly identified candidate." In conclusion, the arguments presented by the courts came to the decision in Buckley v. Valeo to limit donations in campaigns, not spending.

==== Eight magic words ====
It also showed the limited reach of campaign finance laws to candidate and party committees, and other committees with a major purpose of electing candidates, or to speech that "expressly advocated" election or defeat of candidates. In an effort to distinguish between funding that could be limited because it was for the purpose of electing a candidate and so subject to corruption, and funding for independent expenditures that could not be limited because there was no corruption danger, the Court listed eight words or phrases in footnote 52 of that opinion — "vote for," "elect," "support", "cast your ballot for", "____ for Congress", "vote against", "defeat", "reject", or any variations thereof — as illustrative of speech that qualified as "express advocacy". The definition of express advocacy is what created dark money groups.

=== Random audits in the 1970s ===
In the 1970s, the FEC ran random audits into the campaign finances of House representatives. The audits revealed that nearly half of House members had campaign finance violations. Audited House members were more likely to retire. Among those that did not retire, their re-election races were more competitive.

=== Bipartisan Campaign Reform Act (2002) ===
Under FECA, corporations, unions, and individuals could contribute unlimited "nonfederal money"—also known as "soft money"—to political parties for activities intended to influence state or local elections. In a series of advisory opinions between 1977 and 1995, the FEC ruled that political parties could fund "mixed-purpose" activities—including get-out-the-vote drives and generic party advertising—in part with soft money, and that parties could also use soft money to defray the costs of "legislative advocacy media advertisements," even if the ads mentioned the name of a federal candidate, so long as they did not expressly advocate the candidate's election or defeat. Furthermore, in 1996, the Supreme Court decided Colorado Republican Federal Campaign Committee v. FEC, in which the Court ruled that Congress could not restrict the total amount of "independent expenditures" made by a political party without coordination with a candidate, invalidating a FECA provision that restricted how much a political party could spend in connection with a particular candidate. As a result of these rulings, soft money effectively enabled parties and candidates to circumvent FECA's limitations on federal election campaign contributions.

Soft money raised from 1993 to 2002

Party	1993–1994	1995–1996	1997–1998	1999–2000	2001–2002
Democratic Party	45.6 million	122.3 million	92.8 million	243 million	199.6 million
Republican Party	59.5 million	141.2 million	131.6 million	244.4 million	221.7 million
Total contributions	105.1 million	263.5 million	224.4 million	487.4 million	421.3 million

In 2002, Congress further attempted to reform federal campaign financing with the Bipartisan Campaign Reform Act. The BCRA, sometimes called the "McCain-Feingold" Act, amended the FECA in several respects. First, it prohibited national political party committees from soliciting or spending any soft money and prohibited state and local party committees from using soft money for activities that affect federal elections. Second, it prohibited the use of corporate and union treasury funds to pay for "electioneering communications"—broadcast or cable advertisements clearly identifying a federal candidate—within 30 days of a primary or 60 days of a general election. The law also included a "stand by your ad" provision requiring candidates to appear in campaign advertisements and claim responsibility for the ad (most commonly with a phrase similar to "I'm John Smith and I approve this message.")

This law was also challenged in the Supreme Court, but its core provisions were upheld by the Supreme Court in McConnell v. Federal Election Commission. However, in McConnell, the Court also interpreted the "electioneering communications" provisions of BCRA to exempt "nonprofit corporations that [1] were formed for the sole purpose of promoting political ideas, [2] did not engage in business activities, and [3] did not accept contributions from for-profit corporations or labor unions." Thus, non-business, non-profit political organizations could run electioneering advertisements provided that they did not accept corporate or union donations.

Furthermore, the BCRA did not regulate "527 organizations" (named for the section of the tax code under which they operate). These nonprofit organizations are not regulated by the FEC, provided that they do not coordinate with candidates or expressly advocate for the election or defeat of a specific candidate. After the passage of the BCRA, many of the soft money-funded activities previously undertaken by political parties were taken over by various 527 groups, which funded many issue ads in the 2004 presidential election. The heavy spending of key 527 groups to attack presidential candidates brought complaints to the Federal Elections Commission of illegal coordination between the groups and rival political campaigns. (In 2006 and 2007 the FEC fined a number of organizations, including MoveOn.org and Swift Boat Veterans for Truth, for violations arising from the 2004 campaign. The FEC's rationale was that these groups had specifically advocated the election or defeat of candidates, thus making them subject to federal regulation and its limits on contributions to the organizations.)

=== FEC v. Wisconsin Right to Life (2007) ===
The reach of the "electioneering communications" provisions of the BCRA was also limited in the 2007 Supreme Court ruling Federal Election Commission v. Wisconsin Right to Life, Inc. In Wisconsin Right to Life, the Supreme Court stated that the restrictions on "electioneering communications" applied only to advertisements that "can only reasonably be viewed as advocating or opposing a candidate." Thus, if there was any reasonable way to view an advertisement as an "issue ad," it would be exempt from the BCRA's restrictions.

=== Citizens United v. FEC (2010) and SpeechNOW.org v. FEC (2010) ===
Campaign finance law in the United States changed drastically in the wake of two 2010 judicial opinions: the Supreme Court's decision in Citizens United v. FEC and the D.C. Circuit Court of Appeals decision in SpeechNow.org v. FEC. According to a 2011 Congressional Research Service report, these two decisions constitute "the most fundamental changes to campaign finance law in decades."

Citizens United struck down, on free speech grounds, the limits on the ability of organizations that accepted corporate or union money from running electioneering communications. The Court reasoned that the restrictions permitted by Buckley were justified based on avoiding corruption or the appearance of corruption, and that this rationale did not apply to corporate donations to independent organizations. Citizens United overruled the 1990 case Austin v. Michigan Chamber of Commerce, in which the Supreme Court upheld the Michigan Campaign Finance Act, which prohibited corporations from using treasury money to support or oppose candidates in elections.

Two months later, a unanimous nine-judge panel of the U.S. Court of Appeals for the D.C. Circuit decided SpeechNow, which relied on Citizens United to hold that Congress, could not limit donations to organizations that only made independent expenditures, that is, expenditures that were "uncoordinated" with a candidate's campaign. These decisions led to the rise of "independent-expenditure only" PACs, commonly known as "Super PACs." Super PACs, under Citizens United and SpeechNow, can raise unlimited funds from individual and corporate donors and use those funds for electioneering advertisements, provided that the Super PAC does not coordinate with a candidate.

SpeechNow’s impact far exceeded initial predictions. In 2010, then-Attorney General Eric Holder declined to seek Supreme Court review, stating the decision would "affect only a small subset of federally regulated contributions." That has proven not to be the case. Independent expenditures in federal races grew from $140 million in 2008 to over $1 billion by 2012, driven primarily by super PAC spending. By 2024, independent expenditures had soared to $4.2 billion, with super PACs accounting for the majority.

As of January 2026, the Supreme Court has not reviewed SpeechNow, although legal scholars have argued that the lower-court ruling misinterprets Citizens United and is ripe for review.

=== McCutcheon v. Federal Election Commission (2014) ===
On February 19, 2013, the Supreme Court announced it would hear McCutcheon v. Federal Election Commission, a case challenging the limit on how much individuals can donate directly to political parties and federal candidates. On April 2, 2014, the Court announced its opinion and maintained aggregate limits on campaign contributions were unconstitutional under the First Amendment.

== Public financing of campaigns ==
After Citizens United v. FEC and other court rulings ended limits on some campaign spending, reformers concerned about the political deck being unfairly stacked "in favor of the few donors able to give large contributions" concentrated on public finance of political campaigns. The Brennan Center for Justice, for example, promotes "small donor public financing", i.e. a system where "public funds match and multiply small donations", the idea being candidates would be incentivized "to seek out many supporters, not just a few big donors".

=== Of presidential campaigns ===
At the federal level, public funding is limited to subsidies for presidential campaigns. This includes (1) a matching program for the first $250 of each individual contribution during the primary campaign and (2) funding the major party nominees' general election campaigns. Through the 2012 campaign, public funding was also available to finance the major parties' national nominating conventions.

To receive subsidies in the primary, candidates must qualify by privately raising $5000 each in at least 20 states. During the primaries, in exchange for agreeing to limit their spending according to a statutory formula, eligible candidates receive matching payments for the first $250 of each individual contribution (up to half of the spending limit). However, candidates who decline matching funds are free to spend as much money as they can raise privately.

From the inception of this program in 1976 through 1992, almost all candidates who could qualify accepted matching funds in the primary. In 1996 Republican Steve Forbes opted out of the program. In 2000, Forbes and George W. Bush opted out. In 2004 Bush and Democrats John Kerry and Howard Dean chose not to take matching funds in the primary. In 2008, Democrats Hillary Clinton and Barack Obama, and Republicans John McCain, Rudy Giuliani, Mitt Romney and Ron Paul decided not to take primary matching funds. Republican Tom Tancredo and Democrats Chris Dodd, Joe Biden and John Edwards elected to take public financing.

Since the 2012 primary campaign, few candidates have chosen to accept matching funds. In 2012, only Buddy Roemer (who ran unsuccessfully for the Americans Elect and Reform Party nominations), Gary Johnson (the eventual Libertarian nominee), and Jill Stein (the eventual Green Party nominee) received matching funds in the primaries. (Primary season matching funds are not limited to major party candidates.) In 2016, only Martin O'Malley (Democrat) and Jill Stein (Green) received matching funds in the primaries. For the 2020 campaign, only Steve Bullock (Democrat) had announced plans to apply for matching funds by September 2019.

In addition to primary matching funds, the public funding program also assists with funding the major party (and eligible minor party) nominees' general election campaigns. The grants for the major parties' general election nominees are adjusted each Presidential election year to account for increases in the cost of living. In 2012, the parties' general election nominees were eligible to receive $91.2 million in public funds, although neither the Democratic or Republican campaigns chose to accept those funds. If general election candidates accept public funds, they agree not to raise or spend private funds or to spend more than $50,000 of their personal resources. Hence, general election candidates who have the ability to raise more than the amount of public funds offered may decline the offer of public funds in favor of privately raising and spending a larger sum of money.

No major party nominee turned down government funds for the general election from 1976, when the program was launched, until Barack Obama did so in 2008. Obama again declined government funds for the 2012 campaign, as did Republican nominee Mitt Romney, setting up the first election since the program's launch in which neither major party nominee accepted federal funding. Nor did either Donald Trump or Hillary Clinton accept federal funding for the 2016 general election.

Public funding was formerly available to finance the major parties' (and eligible minor parties') presidential nominating conventions. In 2012, each major party was entitled to $18.2 million in public funds for their conventions. However, the provisions for public funding of nominating conventions were eliminated in 2014.

Eligibility of minor parties for public funds is based on showing in the previous election, with 5% of the popular vote needed to qualify. The only party other than the Republicans and Democrats to receive government funding in a general election was the Reform Party, which qualified for public funding in 1996 and 2000 on the basis of Ross Perot's strong showing in the 1992 and 1996 elections. In addition, John B. Anderson's 1980 campaign received payments of public funds after the election because he had attained more than 5% of the popular vote.

The presidential public financing system is funded by a $3 tax check-off on individual tax returns (the check off does not increase the filer's taxes, but merely directs $3 of the government's general fund to the presidential fund). The number of taxpayers who use the check off has fallen steadily since the early 1980s, until by 2006 fewer than 8 percent of taxpayers were directing money to the fund, leaving the fund chronically short of cash. However, the fact that fewer candidates have chosen to apply for public funding has alleviated the fund's former monetary shortages.

=== State and local level ===
A small number of states and cities have started to use broader programs for public financing of campaigns. One method, which its supporters call Clean Money, Clean Elections, gives each candidate who chooses to participate a fixed amount of money. To qualify for this subsidy, the candidates must collect a specified number of signatures and small (usually $5) contributions. The candidates are not allowed to accept outside donations or to use their own personal money if they receive this public funding. Candidates who choose to raise money privately rather than accept the government subsidy are subject to significant administrative burdens and legal restrictions, with the result that most candidates accept the subsidy. This procedure has been in place in races for all statewide and legislative offices in Arizona and Maine since 2000, where a majority of officials were elected without spending any private contributions on their campaigns. Connecticut passed a Clean Elections law in 2005, along with the cities of Portland, Oregon and Albuquerque, New Mexico.

A 2003 study by GAO found, "It is too soon to determine the extent to which the goals of Maine's and Arizona's public financing programs are being met."

The "Clean Elections" movement had several defeats in the 2000s and 2010s. Proposition 89, a California ballot proposition in November 2006, sponsored by the California Nurses Union, that would have provided for public financing of political campaigns and strict contribution limits on corporations, was defeated. In 2008, the non-partisan California Fair Elections Act passed the legislature and Governor Schwarzenegger signed it, but the law did not take effect unless approved by voters in a referendum in 2010. In June 2010, voters soundly rejected the measure, 57% to 43%. A proposal to implement Clean Elections in Alaska was voted down by a two-to-one margin in 2008, and a pilot program in New Jersey was terminated in 2008 amid concern about its constitutionality and that the law was ineffective in accomplishing its goals. In 2010, Portland voters used a referendum to repeal the clean elections law, originally enacted by the city council. In 2006, in Randall v. Sorrell, the Supreme Court held that large parts of Vermont's Clean Elections law were unconstitutional. In 2008, the Supreme Court's decision in Davis v. Federal Election Commission suggested that a key part of most Clean Election laws—a provision granting extra money (or "rescue funds") to participating candidates who are being outspent by non-participating candidates—is unconstitutional. In 2011, in Arizona Free Enterprise Club's Freedom Club PAC v. Bennett, the Supreme Court struck down the matching funds provision of Arizona's law on First Amendment grounds.

Massachusetts has had a hybrid public funding system for statewide offices since 1978. Taxpayers are allowed to contribute $1 to the statewide election fund by checking a box on their annual income taxes. Candidates who agree to spending limits are eligible for money from this fund. Non-participating candidates are required to estimate spending, and this will raise the limit for participating opponents if higher than the agreed-to limit.

Seattle voters approved the Democracy voucher program in 2015, which gives city residents four $25 vouchers to donate to participating candidates. Vouchers have been proposed in other cities and states as a means to diversify the donor pool, help more candidates run for office, and boost political engagement.

== Ethics of spending campaign funds ==
Politicians are sometimes tempted to spend campaign funds for personal purposes instead of their election campaign. One U.S. Representative, Duncan D. Hunter of California, was sentenced to 11 months in prison in 2020 "for spending 2018 campaign donations on family trips to Hawaii and Italy and private school for his children."

In other situations where the line between "legitimate campaign and officeholder expenses" and personal spending can be much finer, the Federal Election Commission uses what it calls an "irrespective test," whereby

personal use is any use of funds in a campaign account of a candidate (or former candidate) to fulfill a commitment, obligation or expense of any person that would exist irrespective of the candidate's campaign or responsibilities as a federal officeholder.

== Sources of data ==
Type of data
Level	Campaign finance	Lobbying	Voting
Federal	OpenSecrets	OpenSecrets; MapLight	MapLight
State	OpenSecrets maintains a publicly accessible database for campaign finance information for state-level races in all 50 states dating back to 1989. MapLight has state-level data for Wisconsin and California. In Pennsylvania the Department of State maintains a database searchable by the public. In California the Secretary of State maintains public databases on campaign finance and lobbying activities.		MapLight for Wisconsin and California
Local	MapLight for a few locations		

Many localities have their own reporting requirements that are not listed here.

== See also ==
- Buckley v. Valeo
- Campaign finance
- Campaign finance reform in the United States
- DISCLOSE Act
- Eight Magic Words
- FEC v. Wisconsin Right to Life
- Money trail
- No corporate PAC pledge
- Political action committee
- Political corruption in the United States
- Political finance
- Testing the waters
- Track AIPAC
