= Regulation CF =

Regulation CF, also known as Regulation Crowdfunding or Reg CF, is a section of the United States Code of Federal Regulations, in particular 17 CFR § 227 (2021) dealing with equity crowdfunding. This section of the law originated with Title III of the 2012 JOBS Act which went into effect on May 16, 2016. It was amended in November 2020, and those amendments effectively became law in 2021.

Several U.S. platforms, called funding portals, currently facilitate Reg CF investments, including Honeycomb Credit, SeedInvest and Wefunder.

Regulation CF has become a fundraising option for startups and small businesses seeking capital from both accredited and non-accredited investors through SEC-registered funding portals. The framework is often used by companies that wish to combine fundraising with community engagement by allowing customers and supporters to become investors.

== See also ==
- Regulation A
