= Online platform =

Online platforms may refer to:

- Online platforms for collaborative consumption
- Online discussion platform
- Online marketing platform
- Online video platform
- Electronic trading platform, for financial products
