= Jumpstart Our Business Startups Act =

United States federal law

- Acronyms (colloquial): JOBS Act
- Nicknames: JOBS Act

Citations
- Public law: Pub. L. 112–106 (text) (PDF)
- Statutes at Large: 126 Stat. 306

Legislative history
- Passed the House on March 8, 2012 (390-23); Passed the Senate on March 22, 2012 (73-26) with amendment; House agreed to Senate amendment on March 27, 2012 (380-41); Signed into law by President Barack Obama on April 5, 2012

The Jumpstart Our Business Startups Act, or JOBS Act, is a law intended to encourage funding of small businesses in the United States by easing many of the country's securities regulations. It passed with bipartisan support, and was signed into law by President Barack Obama on April 5, 2012. Title III, also known as the CROWDFUND Act, has drawn the most public attention because it creates a way for companies to use crowdfunding to issue securities, something that was not previously permitted. Title II went into effect on September 23, 2013. On October 30, 2015, the SEC adopted final rules allowing Title III equity crowdfunding. These rules went into effect on May 16, 2016; this section of the law is known as Regulation CF. Other titles of the Act had previously become effective in the years since the Act's passage.

== Legislative history ==
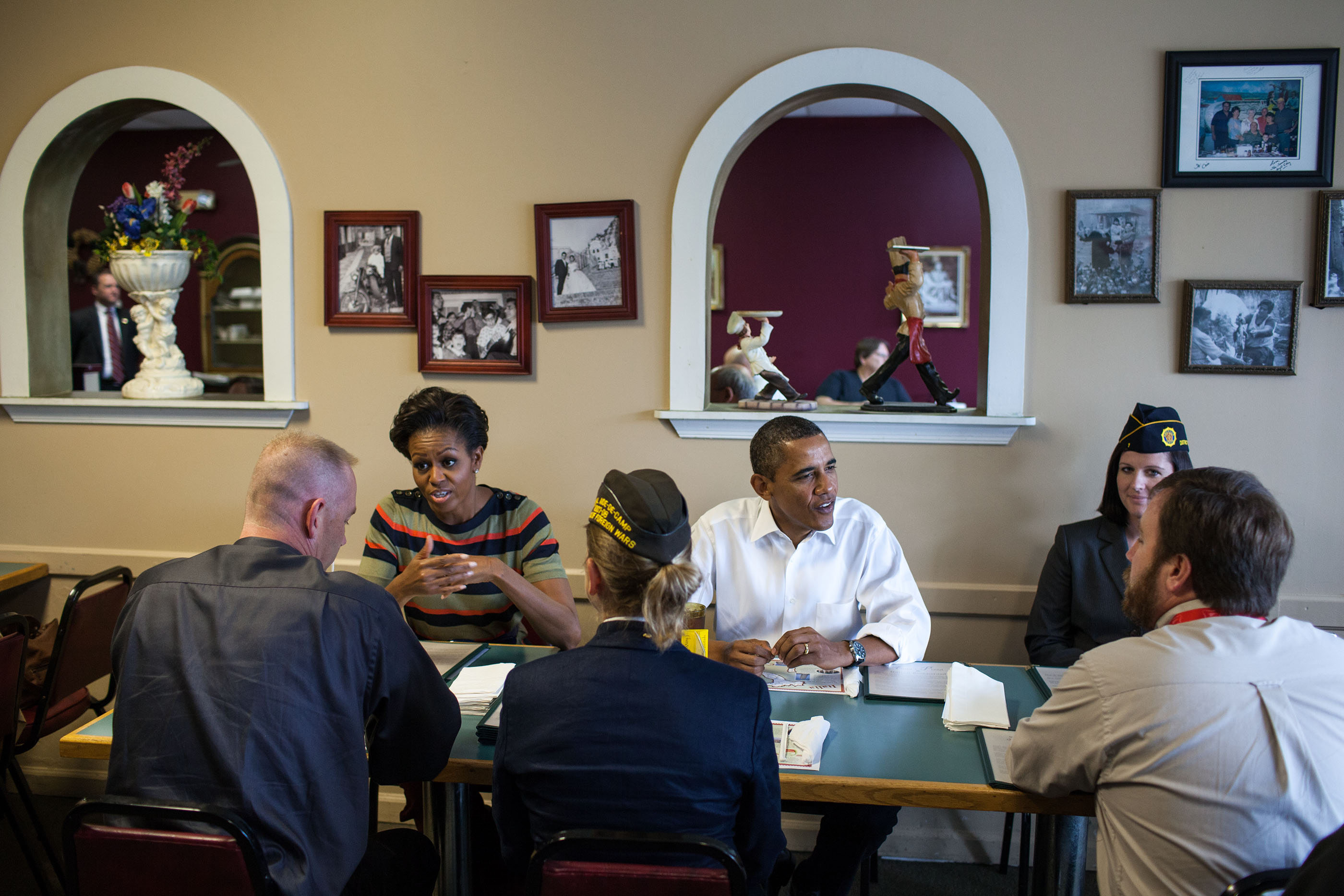
President Barack Obama and First Lady Michelle Obama talk with four veterans during a stop for lunch at Anna's Pizza and Italian Kitchen in Hampton, Va., Oct. 19, 2011 during Obama's American Jobs Act Bus Tour.

Following a decrease in small business activity in the wake of the 2008 financial crisis, Congress considered a number of solutions to help spur economic growth. In November 2011, the House passed several bills aimed at economic revitalization, including Small Company Capital Formation (H.R. 1070), Entrepreneur Access to Capital (H.R. 2930), and Access to Capital for Job Creators (H.R. 2940). The Entrepreneur Access to Capital Act was introduced by Patrick McHenry (R-NC) and revised in collaboration with Carolyn Maloney (D-NY). Informed by the Crowdfunding exemption movement and endorsed by the White House, it was the first U.S. bill designed to create a regulatory exemption for crowdfunded securities.

The passage of H.R. 2930 inspired the introduction of two Senate bills similarly focused on the new crowdfunding exemption: the Democratizing Access to Capital Act (S.1791, Scott Brown, R-MA), and the CROWDFUND (Capital Raising Online While Deterring Fraud and Unethical Non-Disclosure) Act (S.1970, Jeff Merkley, D-OR). All three crowdfunding proposals were referred to the Senate Banking Committee, which took no action on them until March 2012.

In December 2011, Rep. Stephen Lee Fincher (R-TN) introduced into the House the Reopening American Capital Markets to Emerging Growth Companies Act (H.R. 3606), to relieve companies with annual revenue of less than $1 billion from some Sarbanes-Oxley Act compliance requirements. The bill was referred to the House Financial Services Committee.

On March 1, 2012, House Majority Leader Eric Cantor introduced and placed on the House legislative calendar a new version of H.R.3606, renamed Jumpstart Our Business Startups (The JOBS Act). The revised bill included the original H.R. 3606; the already-passed H.R. 1070, H.R. 2930, H.R. 2940; and two other bills that were still before the House: Private Company Flexibility and Growth (H.R. 2167), and Capital Expansion (H.R. 4088). AngelList co-founder Naval Ravikant, who spent six months lobbying for JOBS Act reforms, recalls:

It ended up being a giant dog's breakfast of different bills combined together, and then some genius, probably some congressional staffer, said "How are we gonna get this thing to pass? Oh-- let's say it has something to do with jobs. Jumpstarting Our Business Startups! JOBS, JOBS!" And then, what congressperson can vote against something called the JOBS Act? It was a miracle.

After some debate and revision, the new JOBS Act passed the House on March 8. On March 13, the same day that the Act was placed on the Senate legislative calendar, Sen. Jeff Merkley introduced a revised version of his CROWDFUND bill, S.2190, cosponsored by Michael Bennet (D-CO), Scott Brown (R-MA), and Mary Landrieu (D-LA). The new bill was based on S.1970 but incorporated elements from S.1791, upping the investment caps. It also expanded the liability section to explicitly authorize investors to sue issuers for the amount invested or for damages. On March 19, during the JOBS Act's debate in the Senate, Merkley, Bennet, and Brown amended the legislation by swapping out the language from H.R.2930 and substituting in S.2190.

The resulting revision passed the Senate on March 22, and after some debate passed the House on March 27. The JOBS Act was signed into law at a ceremony in the White House Rose Garden on April 5, 2012.

== Provisions of the bill ==
The JOBS Act substantially changed a number of laws and regulations making it easier for companies to both go public and to raise capital privately and stay private longer. Changes include exemptions for crowdfunding, a more useful version of Regulation A, generally solicited Regulation D Rule 506 offerings, and an easier path to registration of an initial public offering (IPO) for emerging growth companies.

The legislation, among many other things, extends the amount of time that certain new public companies have to begin compliance with certain requirements, including certain requirements that originated with the Sarbanes–Oxley Act, from two years to five years.

The primary provisions of the House bill as amended would:

- Increase the number of shareholders a company may have before being required to register its common stock with the SEC and become a publicly reporting company. These requirements are now generally triggered when a company's assets reach $10 million and it has 500 shareholders of record. The House bill would alter this so that the threshold is reached only if the company has 500 "unaccredited" shareholders, or 2,000 total shareholders, including both accredited and unaccredited shareholders.
- Provide a new exemption from the requirement to register public offerings with the SEC, for certain types of small offerings, subject to several conditions. This exemption would allow use of the internet "funding portals" registered with the government, the use of which in private placements is extremely limited by current law. One of the conditions of this exemption is a yearly aggregate limit on the amount each person may invest in offerings of this type, tiered by the person's net worth or yearly income. The limits are $2,000 or 5% (whichever is greater) for people earning (or worth) up to $100,000, and $10,000 or 10% (whichever is less) for people earning (or worth) $100,000 or more. This exemption is intended to allow a form of equity crowdfunding. While there are already many types of exemptions, most exempt offerings, especially those conducted using the internet, are offered only to accredited investors, or limit the number of non-accredited investors who are allowed to participate, due to the legal restrictions placed on private placements of securities. Additionally, the Bill mandates reviews of financial statements for offerings between $100,000 and $500,000, and audits of financial statements for offerings greater than $500,000 (noting maximum offering of $1,000,000).
- Define "emerging growth companies" as those with less than $1 billion total annual gross revenues in their most recent fiscal year.
- Relieve emerging growth companies from certain regulatory and disclosure requirements in the registration statement they originally file when they go public, and for a period of five years after that. The most significant relief provided is from obligations imposed by Section 404 of the Sarbanes-Oxley Act and related rules and regulations. New public companies now have a two-year phase-in, so this bill would extend that by an additional three years. Smaller public companies are also already entitled to special relief from these requirements, and the bill does not change that.
- Lift the ban on "general solicitation" and advertising in specific kinds of private placements of securities. This allows broader marketing of placements, as long as companies only sell to accredited investors (based on income, net worth or written confirmation from a specified third party).
- Raise the limit for securities offerings exempted under Regulation A from $5 million to $50 million, thereby allowing for larger fundraising efforts under this simplified regulation.
- Raise the number of permitted shareholders in community banks from 500 to 2,000.
- The bill prohibits the crowdfunding of investment funds.

The first six sections, or "Titles", of the JOBS Act are named after the original bills that each was based on, and the last section, Title VII, tells the SEC to conduct outreach regarding the new legislation to SMEs and businesses owned by women, veterans, and minorities. Title III of the Act, the crowdfunding provision, has been called one of the most momentous securities exemptions enacted since the original Securities Act of 1933.

=== Titles ===
The titles of the bill are:

- TITLE I - REOPENING AMERICAN CAPITAL MARKETS TO EMERGING GROWTH COMPANIES
- TITLE II - ACCESS TO CAPITAL FOR JOB CREATORS
- TITLE III - CROWDFUNDING
- TITLE IV - SMALL COMPANY CAPITAL FORMATION
- TITLE V - PRIVATE COMPANY FLEXIBILITY AND GROWTH
- TITLE VI - CAPITAL EXPANSION
- TITLE VII - OUTREACH ON CHANGES TO THE LAW OR COMMISSION

== Reception ==
=== Support ===
The JOBS Act had bipartisan support in Congress. It was supported by many in the technology and startup communities, including Google, Steve Case (founder of AOL), Mitch Kapor (founder of Lotus), and many other investors and entrepreneurs. It is also supported by the National Venture Capital Association, which described the bill as modernizing regulations that were put in place almost 100 years before, by among other things facilitating use of online services to make investments in small companies. The "equity crowdfunding" provisions, also known as "securities crowdfunding", which allow companies to sell securities through open platforms, were often likened to the Kickstarter online model for funding artists and designers. Academic research shows that the Act lead to public firms making more acquisitions, doing so more quickly after listing, and also increase other forms of investment.

The JOBS Act is also a welcome development for nonprofit organizations which operate crowd funding platforms for microfinance loans, such as Kiva and Zidisha. These organizations have not obtained licenses as securities brokers due to high legal compliance costs. Kiva, an organization that allows individual web users to support microloans managed by intermediaries in developing countries, complies with SEC regulations by making it impossible for lenders to earn a positive financial return. Zidisha, which operates an eBay-style platform that allows individual web users to transact directly with computer-literate borrowers in developing countries, does allow lenders to earn interest, but complies with SEC regulations by not guaranteeing cash payouts. RocketHub testified in Congress June 26, 2012 in support of the JOBS Act and its intent to offer equity crowdfunding.

The bill was also supported by David Weild IV, former vice-chairman of NASDAQ, who also testified before Congress. Studies written by Weild, co-authored by Edward H. Kim and published by Grant Thornton, "identif[ied] changes to stock market structure that gave rise to a decline in the IPO market", and thus "gave rise to the JOBS Act", according to Devin Thorpe of Forbes magazine. This has led some to refer to Weild as the "father" of the JOBS Act. The first company to complete an initial public offering using provisions under the Jobs Act was Natural Grocers by Vitamin Cottage (NYSE:NGVC) on July 25, 2012.

=== Criticism ===
The final Act faced criticism on several fronts. Some proponents of crowdfunding were disappointed that the final version of Title III, the crowdfunding exemption, capped investment at $1 million and required a number of disclosures that could make the exemption unworkable for smaller start-ups, especially given the $1 million cap. This title was also criticized for not including a means by which investors could form crowdfunding funds, thereby diversifying their investments. While Title IV included some loosening of restrictions on the use of Regulation A, it did not grant full federal preemption. That is, for certain offerings companies still must register the offering with each state. State-by-state registration was one of the chief reasons the Government Accountability Office found for the remarkably low interest in Regulation A offerings pre-JOBS Act.

The Act was also criticized by some consumer groups. For example, the bill was opposed by some securities regulators and consumer and investor advocates, including the AARP, the Consumer Federation of America, the Council of Institutional Investors, and others. Among the complaints were that the loosening of investment protections would expose small and inexperienced investors to fraud. The Consumer Federation of America characterized an earlier version of the legislation as "the dangerous and discredited notion that the way to create jobs is to weaken regulatory protections". Criminologist William K. Black had said the bill would lead to a "regulatory race to the bottom" and said it was lobbied by Wall Street to weaken the Sarbanes–Oxley Act. It is also opposed by labor unions, including the AFL-CIO, the AFSCME, and the National Education Association.

Criticisms were levied against the House version of the bill as "gutting regulations designed to safeguard investors", legalizing boiler room operations, "reliev[ing] businesses that are preparing to go public from some of the most important auditing regulations that Congress passed after the Enron debacle", and "a terrible package of bills that would undo essential investor protections, reduce market transparency and distort the efficient allocation of capital". The bill also removed certain disclosure requirements, such as the disclosure of executive compensation, which were not in the spirit of the bill.

== Current status ==
Titles I, V, and VI of the JOBS Act became effective immediately upon enactment. The SEC approved the lifting of the general solicitation ban on July 10, 2013, paving the way for the adoption of Title II. As of October 2014, Titles III, and IV are awaiting more detailed rulemaking by the SEC, which did not meet its original deadlines. Some have attributed the delay to former SEC chair Mary Schapiro's concerns over her legacy. Title III rules were proposed for adoption by the SEC on October 23, 2013. On May 16, 2016, Title III Regulation Crowdfunding rules enacted by the SEC went live.

In an open meeting March 25, 2015, the Securities and Exchange Commission (SEC) elected to approve and release the long-awaited final rules for Title IV of the JOBS Act (commonly referred to as Regulation A+). Per the final rules, under Regulation A companies will be permitted to offer and sell up to $50 million of securities to the general public subject to certain eligibility, disclosure and reporting requirements. While some offerings will be exempt from state registration requirements, in exchange for more extensive reporting requirements, others will not be and will still have to register with every state in which the securities are offered. For offerings made over the internet, this arguably means registering in all 50 states. The final Regulation A rules were published in the Federal Register on April 20, 2015, and became effective on June 19, 2015.

On October 30, 2015, the Securities and Exchange Commission "adopted final rules to permit companies to offer and sell securities through crowdfunding. The Commission also voted to propose amendments to existing Securities Act rules to facilitate intrastate and regional securities offerings."

On November 2, 2020, the SEC made large changes to expand on the scope of the act. In Regulation Crowdfunding, the maximum offering amount increased from $1.07 million to $5 million. In Regulation D, the same limit increased from $5 million to $10 million. In Regulation A, the same limit increased from $50 million to $75 million. Other marketing, advertising, or so-called "testing the water" constraints are also loosened.

== Industry associations ==
A number of US organizations have been founded to provide education and advocacy related to equity crowdfunding as enabled by the JOBS Act. They include:

- Crowdfunding Professional Association
- National Crowdfunding Association
- CrowdFund Intermediary Regulatory Advocates

== See also ==
- Capital formation
