= Kanapėna =

- Village
- Location in Lithuania Kanapėna (Lithuania)
- Coordinates: 55°12′32″N 23°36′40″E
- Country: Lithuania
- County: Kaunas County
- Municipality: Kėdainiai district municipality
- Eldership: Pernarava Eldership

Population (2011)
  - Total: 0
- Time zone: UTC+2 (EET)
  - Summer (DST): UTC+3 (EEST)

Kanapėna ('cannabis field', formerly Russian: Конопине) is a village in Kėdainiai district municipality, in Kaunas County, in central Lithuania. According to the 2011 census, the village was uninhabited. It is located 4 kilometres (2.5 mi) from Pesliškės, alongside the A1 highway.

== Demography ==
Historical population

| Year | Pop. | ±% p.a. |
|---|---|---|
| 1902 | 7 | — |
| 1923 | 19 | +4.87% |
| 1959 | 5 | −3.64% |
| 1970 | 5 | +0.00% |

| Year | Pop. | ±% p.a. |
|---|---|---|
| 1979 | 5 | +0.00% |
| 1989 | 0 | −100.00% |
| 2001 | 0 | 0.00% |
| 2011 | 0 | 0.00% |

Source: 1902, 1923, 1959 & 1970, 1979, 1989, 2001, 2011
