= Vainikoniai =

- Village
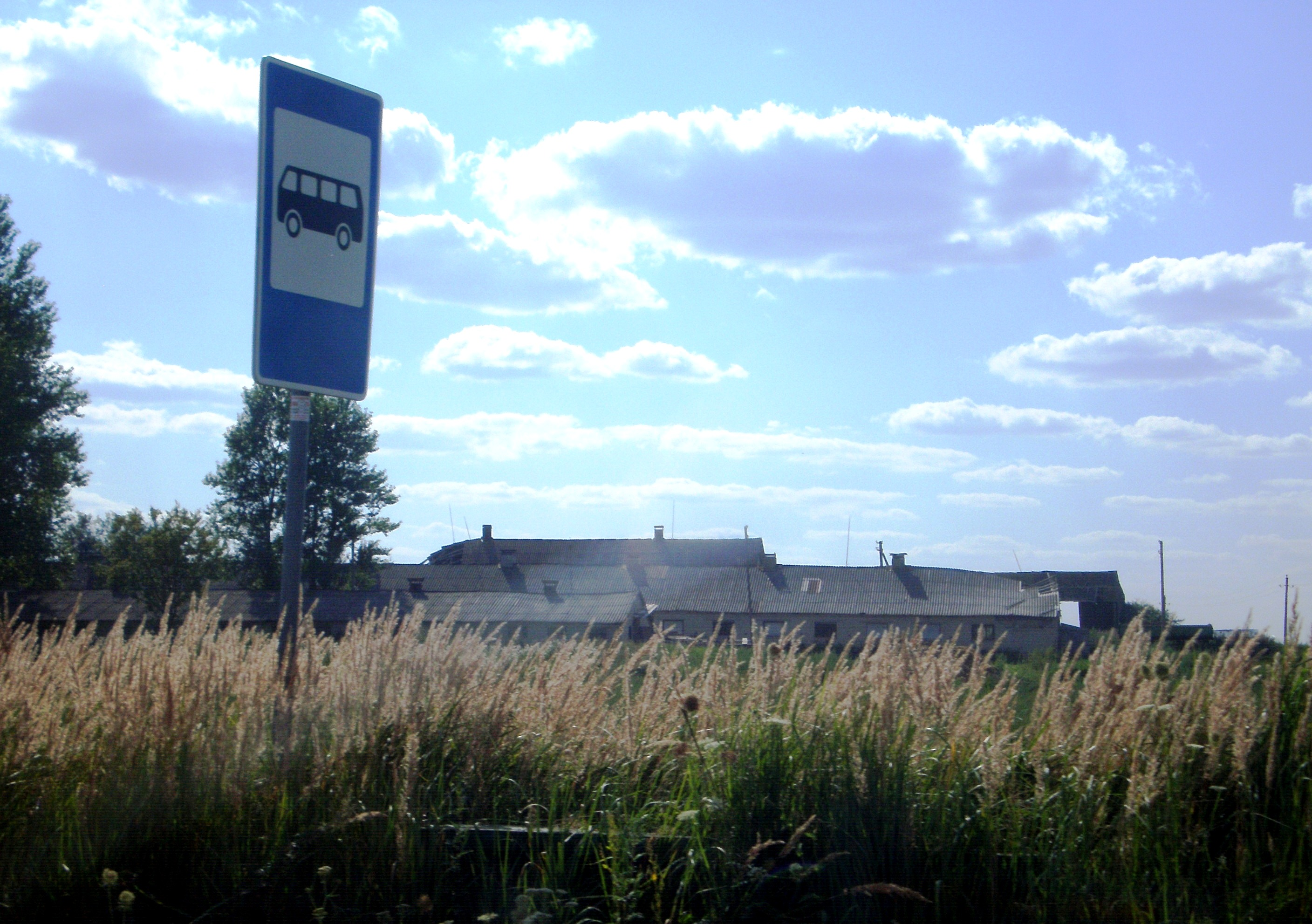

- Location in Lithuania Vainikoniai (Lithuania)
- Coordinates: 55°13′52″N 23°40′30″E
- Country: Lithuania
- County: Kaunas County
- Municipality: Kėdainiai district municipality
- Eldership: Pernarava Eldership

Population (2011)
  - Total: 3
- Time zone: UTC+2 (EET)
  - Summer (DST): UTC+3 (EEST)

Vainikoniai (formerly Russian: Войникони) is a village in Kėdainiai district municipality, in Kaunas County, in central Lithuania. According to the 2011 census, the village had a population of 3 people. It is located 1 kilometre (0.62 mi) from Jakšiai, next to the Sakuona river. There is an abandoned kolkhoz warehouse and a technic yard complex.

Vainikoniai was established during the Interwar in the former land of the Sakūnėliai estate.

== Demography ==
Historical population

Year	Pop.	±% p.a.
1923	138	—
1959	134	−0.08%
1970	111	−1.70%
1979	44	−9.77%

Year	Pop.	±% p.a.
1989	11	−12.94%
2001	7	−3.70%
2011	3	−8.12%

Source: 1902, 1923, 1959 & 1970, 1979, 1989, 2001, 2011
