= Paliediškiai =

- Village
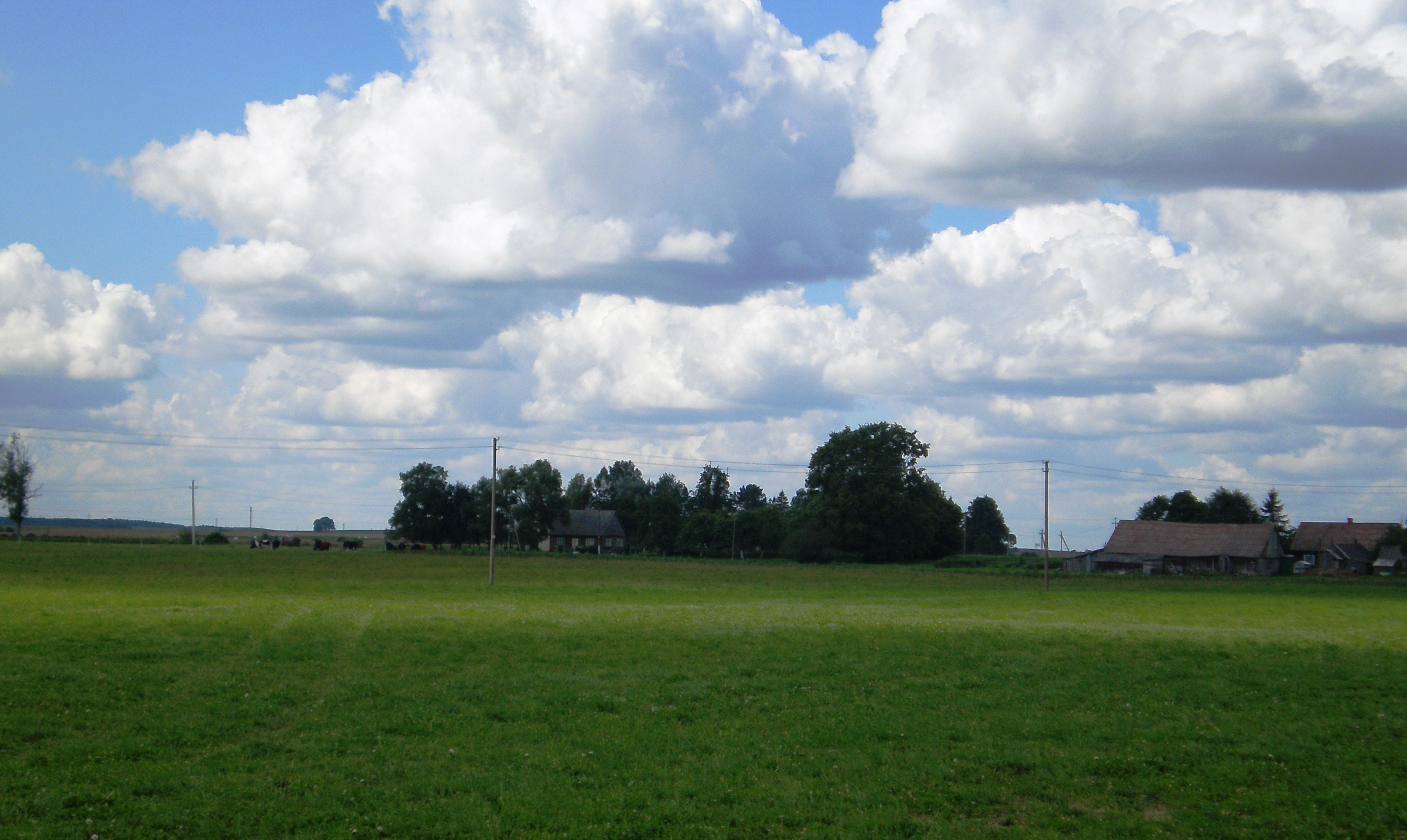

- Location in Lithuania Paliediškiai (Lithuania)
- Coordinates: 55°15′29″N 23°39′11″E
- Country: Lithuania
- County: Kaunas County
- Municipality: Kėdainiai district municipality
- Eldership: Pernarava Eldership

Population (2011)
  - Total: 14
- Time zone: UTC+2 (EET)
  - Summer (DST): UTC+3 (EEST)

Paliediškiai is a village in Kėdainiai district municipality, in Kaunas County, in central Lithuania. According to the 2011 census, the village had a population of 14 people. It is located between Pernarava and Pelutava, by the Liedas river.

== Demography ==
Historical population

Year	Pop.	±% p.a.
1923	80	—
1959	80	+0.00%
1970	63	−2.15%
1979	50	−2.54%

Year	Pop.	±% p.a.
1989	26	−6.33%
2001	20	−2.16%
2011	14	−3.50%

Source: 1902, 1923, 1959 & 1970, 1979, 1989, 2001, 2011
