= Vytautėliai =

- Village
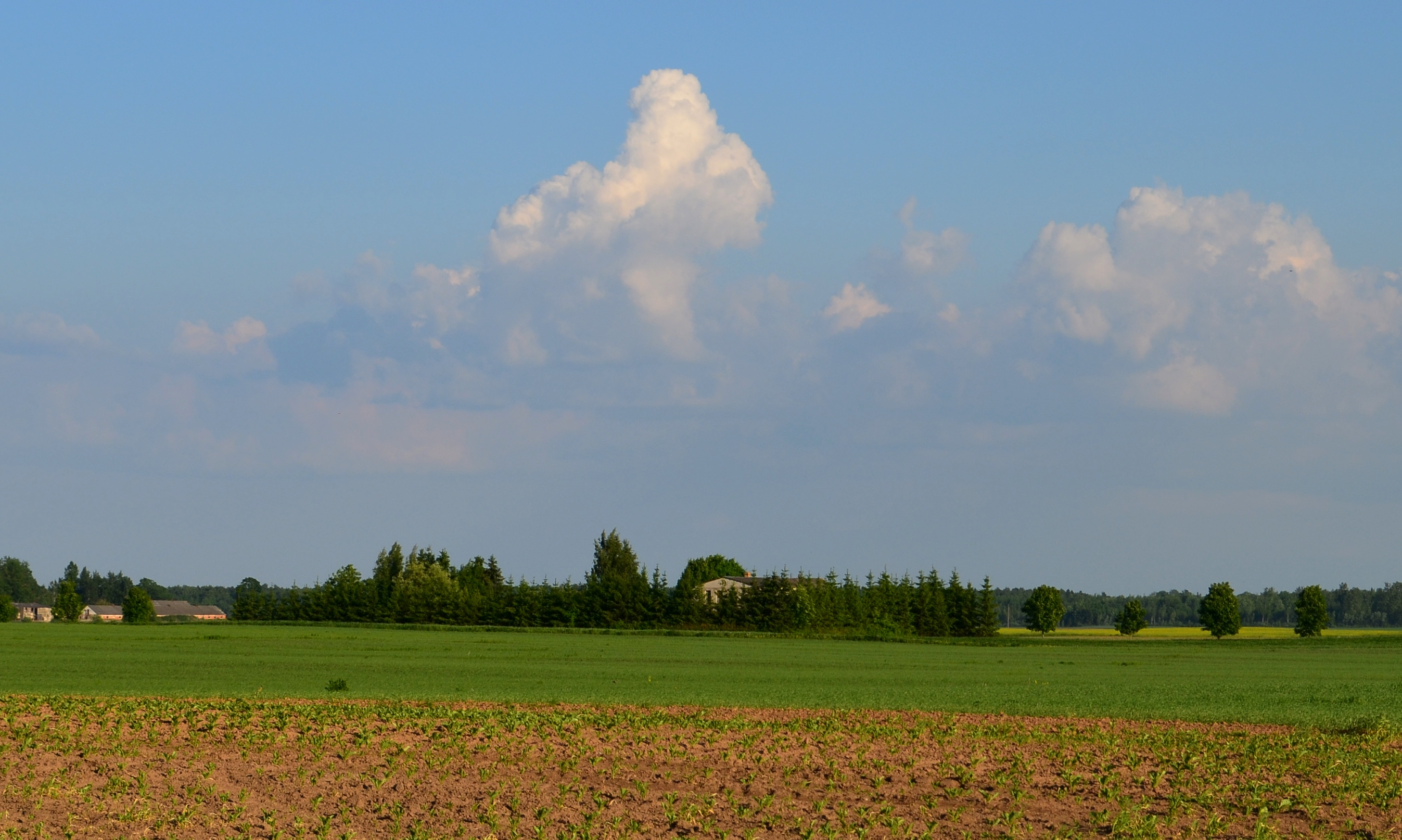

- Location in Lithuania Vytautėliai (Lithuania)
- Coordinates: 55°14′20″N 23°39′40″E
- Country: Lithuania
- County: Kaunas County
- Municipality: Kėdainiai district municipality
- Eldership: Pernarava Eldership

Population (2011)
  - Total: 1
- Time zone: UTC+2 (EET)
  - Summer (DST): UTC+3 (EEST)

Vytautėliai is a village in Kėdainiai district municipality, in Kaunas County, in central Lithuania. According to the 2011 census, the village had a population of 1 person. It is located 3.5 kilometres (2.2 mi) from Pernarava, next to Blandžiai village.

== Demography ==
Historical population

Year	Pop.	±% p.a.
1959	53	—
1970	40	−2.53%
1979	24	−5.52%

Year	Pop.	±% p.a.
1989	0	−100.00%
2001	1	—
2011	1	+0.00%

Source: 1902, 1923, 1959 & 1970, 1979, 1989, 2001, 2011

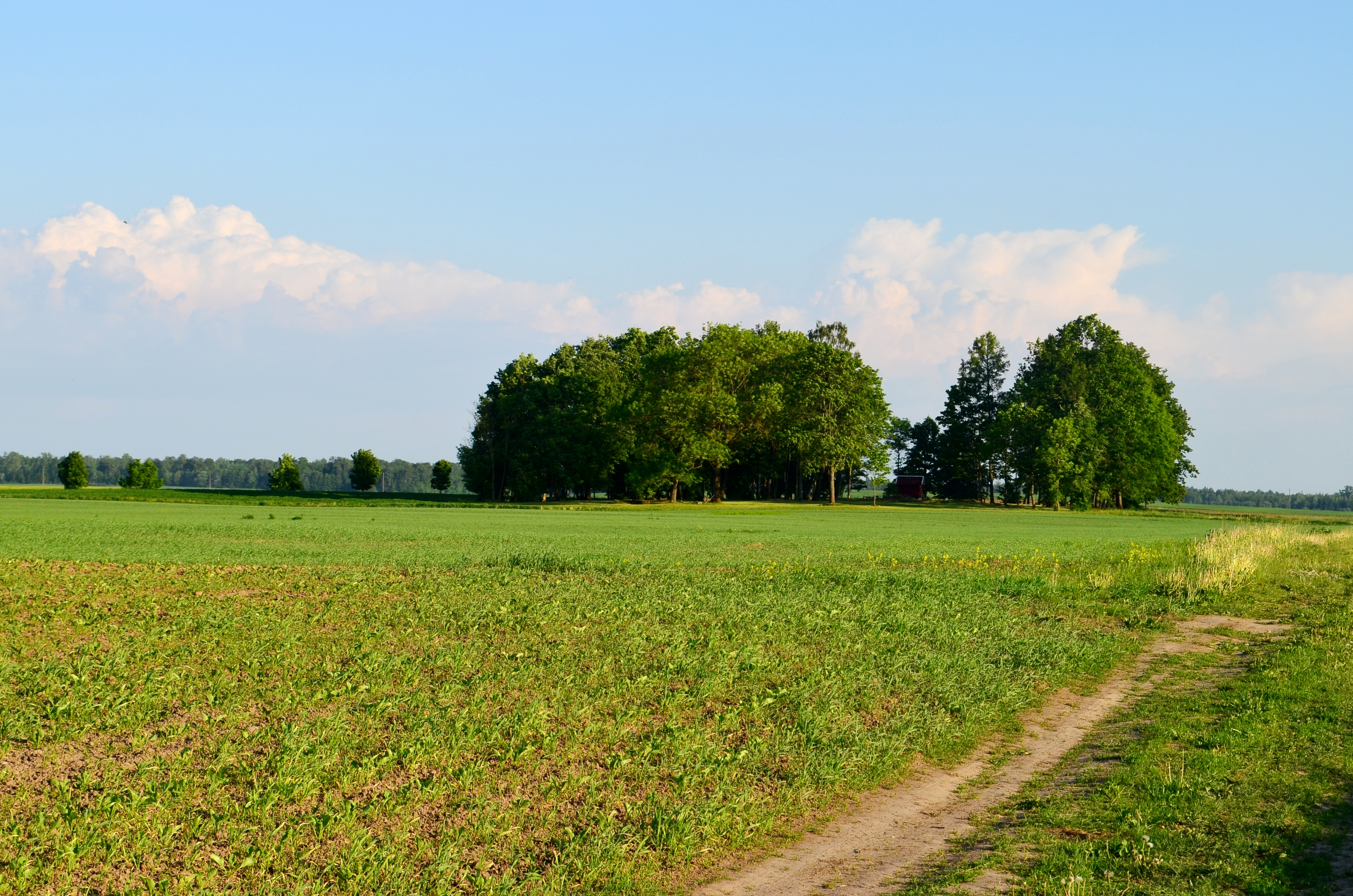
Site of a former homestead in Vytautėliai
