= Juodgiris, Kėdainiai =

Juodgiris
- Village
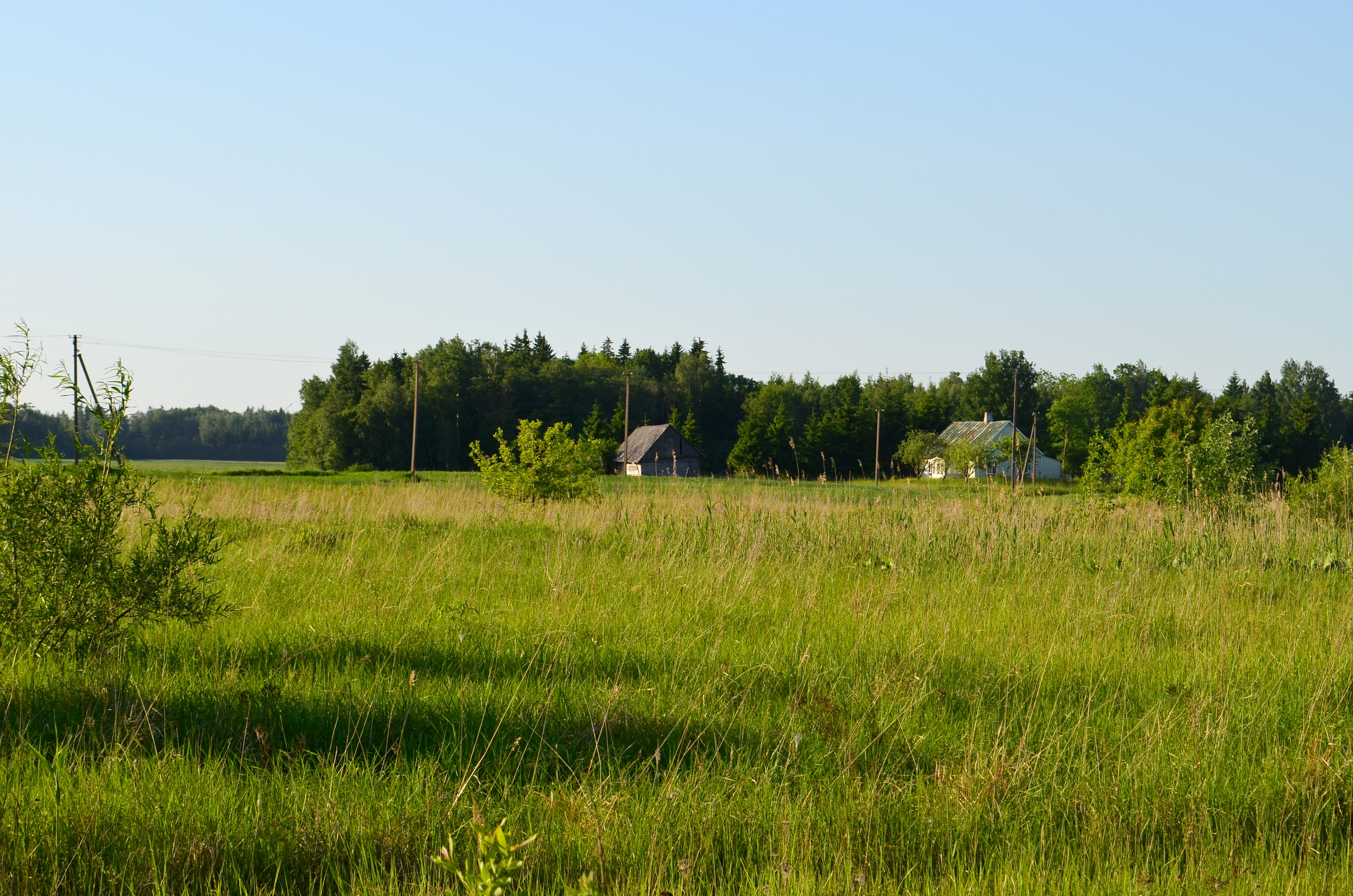

- Location in Lithuania Juodgiris (Lithuania)
- Coordinates: 55°12′00″N 23°37′30″E
- Country: Lithuania
- County: Kaunas County
- Municipality: Kėdainiai district municipality
- Eldership: Pernarava Eldership

Population (2011)
  - Total: 2
- Time zone: UTC+2 (EET)
  - Summer (DST): UTC+3 (EEST)

Juodgiris ('black wood', formerly Russian: Іодгирисъ, Polish: Jodgirys) is a village in Kėdainiai district municipality, in Kaunas County, in central Lithuania. According to the 2011 census, the village had a population of 2 people. It is located 2 kilometres (1.2 mi) from Paaluonys, by the Leštupys rivulet, alongside the A1 highway. There is a petrol station.

There were 3 Juodgiris zaścianki (two in Ariogala volost and one in Vilkija volost) at the beginning of the 20th century.

== Demography ==
Historical population

Year	Pop.	±% p.a.
1902	11	—
1923	35	+5.67%
1959	28	−0.62%
1970	17	−4.43%

Year	Pop.	±% p.a.
1979	8	−8.03%
1989	2	−12.94%
2001	2	+0.00%
2011	2	+0.00%

Source: 1902, 1923, 1959 & 1970, 1979, 1989, 2001, 2011
