= Paskotiškė =

- Village
- Location in Lithuania Paskotiškė (Lithuania)
- Coordinates: 55°10′10″N 23°33′14″E
- Country: Lithuania
- County: Kaunas County
- Municipality: Kėdainiai district municipality
- Eldership: Pernarava Eldership

Population (2011)
  - Total: 0
- Time zone: UTC+2 (EET)
  - Summer (DST): UTC+3 (EEST)

Paskotiškė is a village in Kėdainiai district municipality, in Kaunas County, in central Lithuania. It is located 2 kilometres (1.2 mi) from Čekiškė, by the Glaušė rivulet. According to the 2011 census, the village was uninhabited.

== Demography ==
Historical population

Year	Pop.	±% p.a.
1959	12	—
1970	10	−1.64%

Year	Pop.	±% p.a.
2001	0	−100.00%
2011	0	0.00%

Source: 1902, 1923, 1959 & 1970, 1979, 1989, 2001, 2011
