= Lesčiukai =

- Village
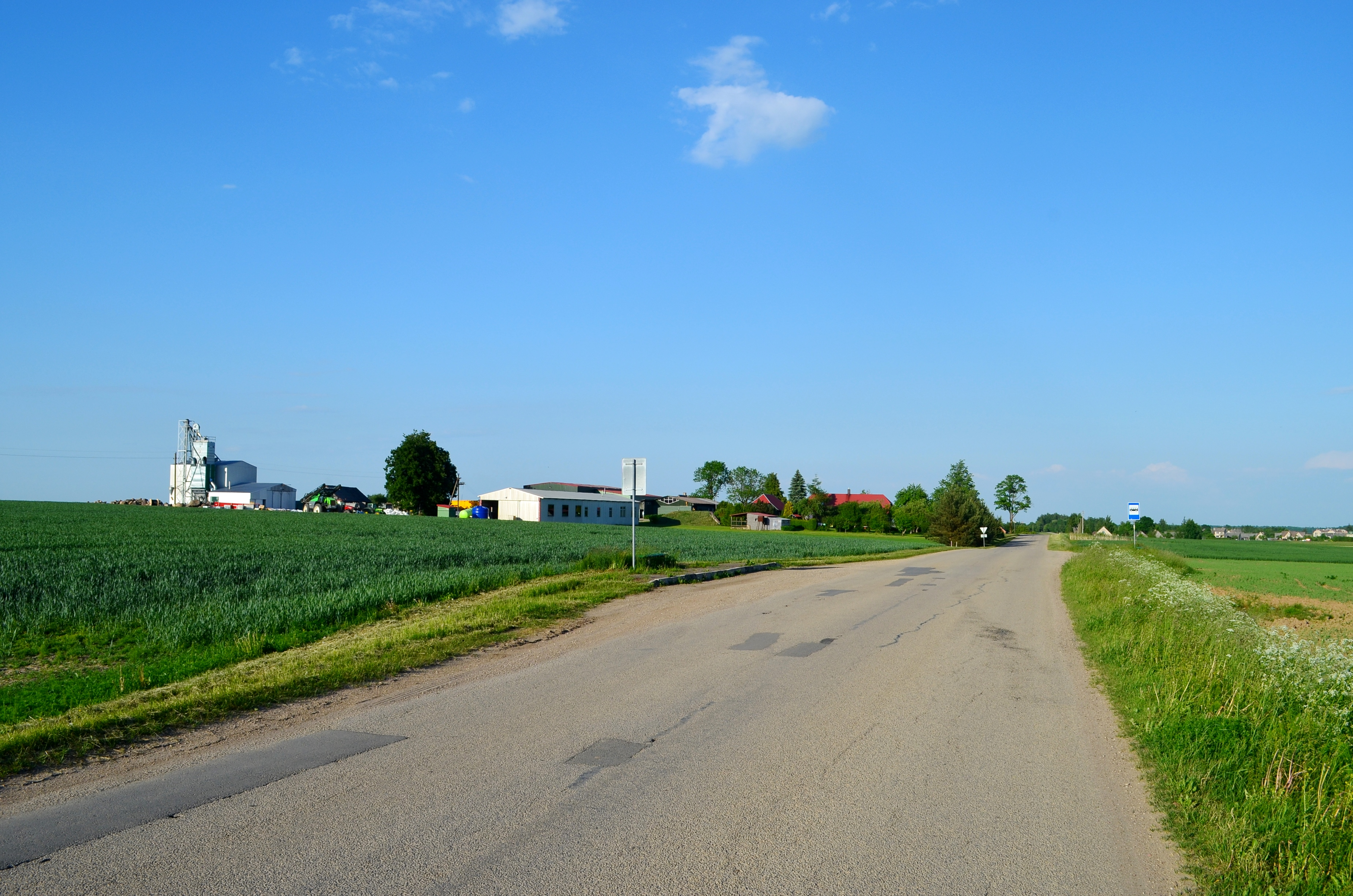

- Location in Lithuania Lesčiukai (Lithuania)
- Coordinates: 55°13′08″N 23°36′22″E
- Country: Lithuania
- County: Kaunas County
- Municipality: Kėdainiai district municipality
- Eldership: Pernarava Eldership

Population (2011)
  - Total: 15
- Time zone: UTC+2 (EET)
  - Summer (DST): UTC+3 (EEST)

Lesčiukai is a village in Kėdainiai district municipality, in Kaunas County, in central Lithuania. According to the 2011 census, the village had a population of 15 people. It is located 0.5 kilometres (0.31 mi) from Paaluonys, nearby the Aluona river and the A1 highway. There is a farm.

Lesčiukai was established in the former lands of Lesčiai folwark.

== Demography ==
Historical population

Year	Pop.	±% p.a.
1923	38	—
1959	44	+0.41%
1970	34	−2.32%
1979	29	−1.75%

Year	Pop.	±% p.a.
1989	33	+1.30%
2001	31	−0.52%
2011	15	−7.00%

Source: 1902, 1923, 1959 & 1970, 1979, 1989, 2001, 2011
