= Pakalniškiai, Kėdainiai =

Pakalniškiai
- Village
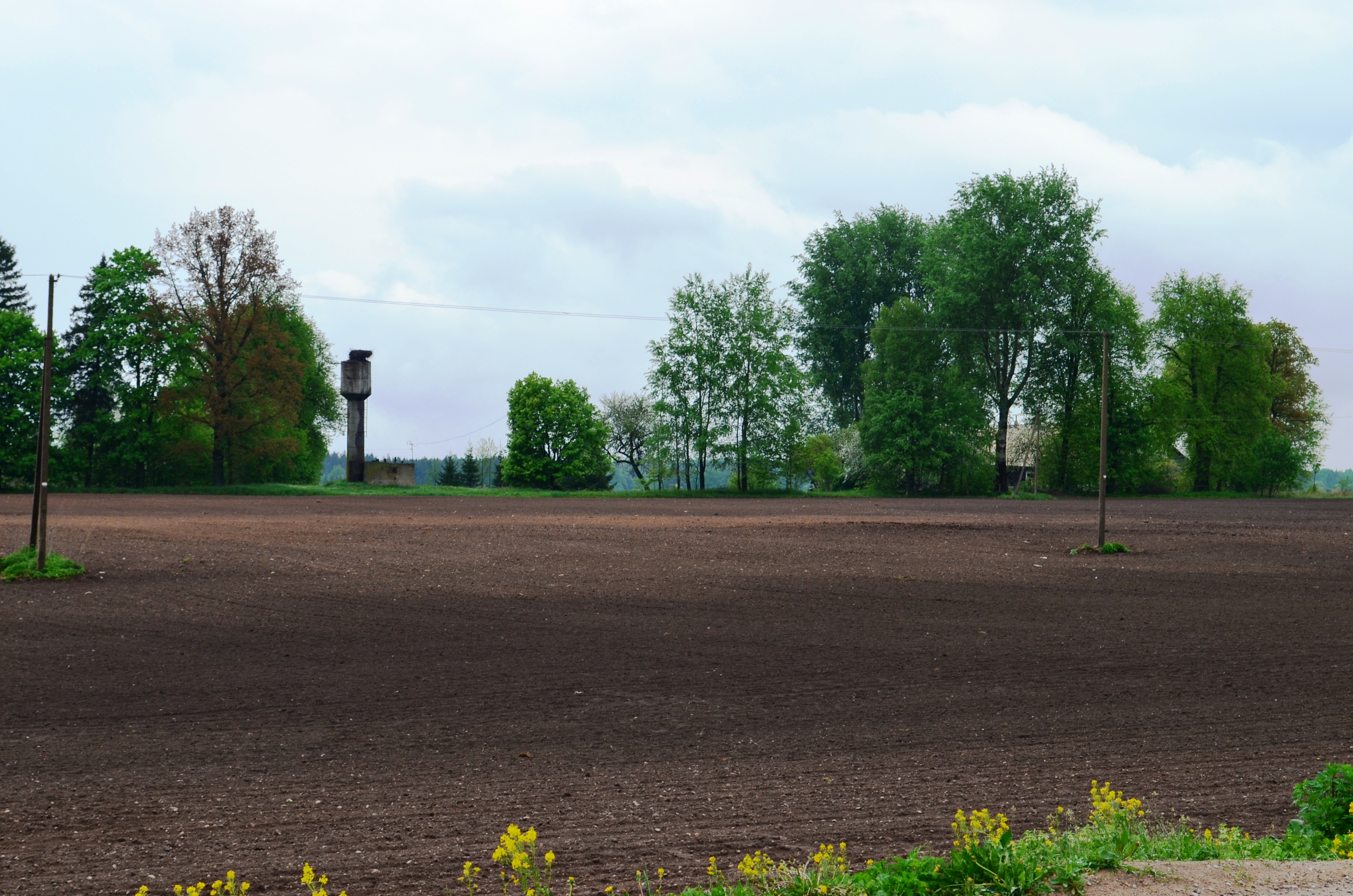

- Location in Lithuania Pakalniškiai (Lithuania)
- Coordinates: 55°16′08″N 23°36′22″E
- Country: Lithuania
- County: Kaunas County
- Municipality: Kėdainiai district municipality
- Eldership: Pernarava Eldership

Population (2011)
  - Total: 19
- Time zone: UTC+2 (EET)
  - Summer (DST): UTC+3 (EEST)

Pakalniškiai (formerly Russian: Пакальнишки, Polish: Pokalniszki) is a village in Kėdainiai district municipality, in Kaunas County, in central Lithuania. According to the 2011 census, the village had a population of 19 people. It is located 2 kilometres (1.2 mi) from Pernarava, by the Josvainiai-Ariogala road. There is a water tower.

There was an okolica of Pakalniškiai (a property of the Vaitkevičiai and Sasnauskai) at the beginning of the 20th century.

== Demography ==
Historical population

Year	Pop.	±% p.a.
1902	22	—
1923	41	+3.01%
1959	43	+0.13%
1970	33	−2.38%

Year	Pop.	±% p.a.
1979	21	−4.90%
1989	21	+0.00%
2001	22	+0.39%
2011	19	−1.46%

Source: 1902, 1923, 1959 & 1970, 1979, 1989, 2001, 2011
