= Duogiai, Kėdainiai =

Duogiai
- Village
- Location in Lithuania Duogiai (Lithuania)
- Coordinates: 55°15′0″N 23°35′0″E
- Country: Lithuania
- County: Kaunas County
- Municipality: Kėdainiai district municipality
- Eldership: Pernarava Eldership

Population (2011)
  - Total: 0
- Time zone: UTC+2 (EET)
  - Summer (DST): UTC+3 (EEST)

Duogiai (formerly Russian: Доги, Polish: Dogi, Dogie) is a village in Kėdainiai district municipality, in Kaunas County, in central Lithuania. According to the 2011 census, the village was uninhabited. It is located 3 kilometres (1.9 mi) from Pernarava.

It was an okolica (a property of the Kelčiavos, Koricos, Leščiučiai, Losinskiai, Sutkevičiai families) at the beginning of the 20th century.

== Demography ==
Historical population

Year	Pop.	±% p.a.
1902	55	—
1923	66	+0.87%
1959	23	−2.89%
1970	9	−8.18%

Year	Pop.	±% p.a.
1979	2	−15.39%
1989	0	−100.00%
2001	0	0.00%
2011	0	0.00%

Source: 1902, 1923, 1959 & 1970, 1979, 1989, 2001, 2011
