= Pernarava Eldership =

Pernarava Eldership Pernaravos seniūnija
- Eldership
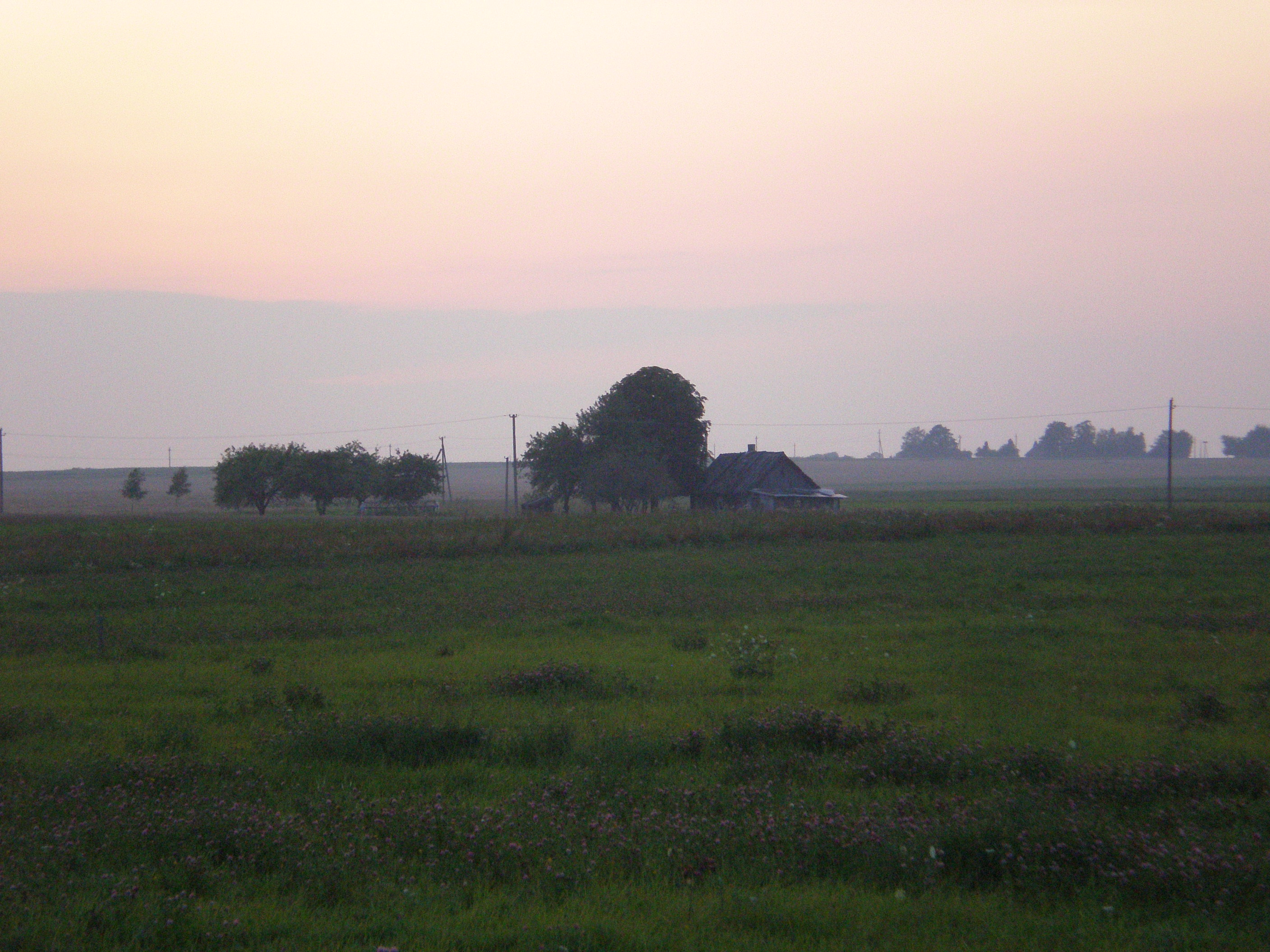
- Evening landscape in Pavinkšniai

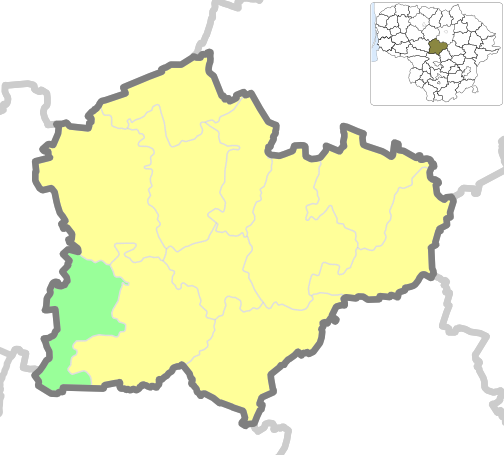
- Location of Pernarava Eldership
- Country: Lithuania
- Ethnographic region: Aukštaitija
- County: Kaunas County
- Municipality: Kėdainiai District Municipality
- Administrative centre: Pernarava

Area
  - Total: 114.7 km^{2} (44.3 sq mi)

Population (2011)
  - Total: 1,484
  - Density: 12.94/km^{2} (33.51/sq mi)
- Time zone: UTC+2 (EET)
  - Summer (DST): UTC+3 (EEST)

Pernarava Eldership (Lithuanian: Pernaravos seniūnija) is a Lithuanian eldership, located in the south western part of Kėdainiai District Municipality.

Eldership was created from the Pernarava selsovet in 1993.

== Geography ==
The territory of Pernarava Eldership is located mostly in the Nevėžis Plain, but the western edges are in the East Samogitian Plateau. Relief is mostly flat, cultivated as agriculture lands. Forests cover 10 % of the eldership.

- Rivers: Šušvė (with Liedas), Aluona (with Žvaranta), Gynėvė
- Lakes and ponds: Angiriai Reservoir.
- Forests: Pernarava-Šaravai Forest.
- Protected areas: Lendrynė Ornitological Sanctuary.
- Nature monuments: Griniai Oak Tree

== Places of interest ==
- Catholic church of Crucified Jesus in Pernarava
- Preikapė ancient burial place
- Rugėnai memorial cross

== Populated places ==
Following settlements are located in the Pernarava Eldership (as for the 2011 census):

- Towns: Pernarava
- Villages: Aukštdvaris · Aukštkalniai · Blandžiai · Bumbulynė · Daukšai · Dratkalnis · Duogiai · Gegužiai · Gižiemiai · Gožiai · Grineliai · Griniai · Gučkampis · Jakšiai · Jankūnai · Juodgiris · Juodžiai · Kanapėna · Kantrimas · Kupsčiai · Langakiai · Laučynė · Lesčiukai · Mantigailiai · Milašiūnai · Milvydai · Paaluonys · Pakalniškiai · Paliediškiai · Paskotiškė · Pavinkšniai · Pelutava · Pernarava · Pesliškės · Preikapė · Rudakiai · Rugėnai · Sauskojai · Šliužiai · Vainikoniai · Vencloviškiai · Vytautėliai · Voskaičiai · Žostautai · Žostautėliai
