= Milašiūnai, Kėdainiai =

Milašiūnai
- Village
- Location in Lithuania Milašiūnai (Lithuania)
- Coordinates: 55°15′40″N 23°37′52″E
- Country: Lithuania
- County: Kaunas County
- Municipality: Kėdainiai district municipality
- Eldership: Pernarava Eldership

Population (2011)
  - Total: 0
- Time zone: UTC+2 (EET)
  - Summer (DST): UTC+3 (EEST)

Milašiūnai (formerly Polish: Miłaszuny) is a village in Kėdainiai district municipality, in Kaunas County, in central Lithuania. According to the 2011 census, the village was uninhabited. It is located 2 kilometres (1.2 mi) from Pernarava.

It was an okolica (a property of the Daugėlavičiai, Urnėžiai, Čulickiai families) at the beginning of the 20th century. There was a windmill nearby.

== Demography ==
Historical population

Year	Pop.	±% p.a.
1923	46	—
1959	37	−0.60%
1970	16	−7.34%
1979	4	−14.28%

Year	Pop.	±% p.a.
1989	0	−100.00%
2001	0	0.00%
2011	0	0.00%

Source: 1902, 1923, 1959 & 1970, 1979, 1989, 2001, 2011
