= Rudakiai =

- Village
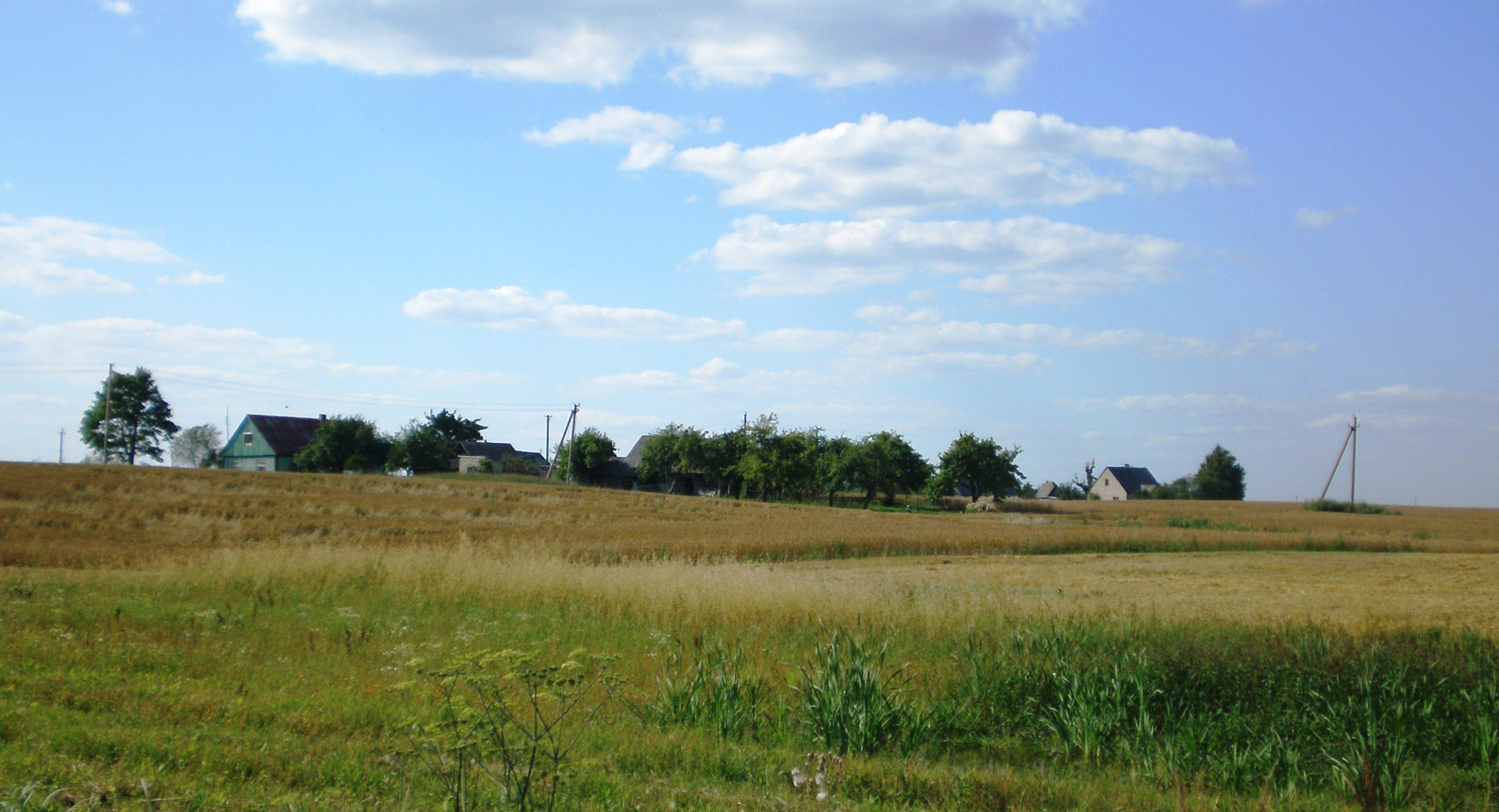

- Location in Lithuania Rudakiai (Lithuania)
- Coordinates: 55°13′30″N 23°39′00″E
- Country: Lithuania
- County: Kaunas County
- Municipality: Kėdainiai district municipality
- Eldership: Pernarava Eldership

Population (2011)
  - Total: 25
- Time zone: UTC+2 (EET)
  - Summer (DST): UTC+3 (EEST)

Rudakiai (formerly Russian: Рудаки, Polish: Rudaki) is a village in Kėdainiai district municipality, in Kaunas County, in central Lithuania. According to the 2011 census, the village had a population of 25 people. It is located 2 kilometres (1.2 mi) from Paaluonys, next to the Aluona river and its tributaries the Sakuona and the Mėlupis.

== Demography ==
Historical population

Year	Pop.	±% p.a.
1902	112	—
1923	169	+1.98%
1959	118	−0.99%
1970	99	−1.58%

Year	Pop.	±% p.a.
1979	61	−5.24%
1989	32	−6.25%
2001	37	+1.22%
2011	25	−3.84%

Source: 1902, 1923, 1959 & 1970, 1979, 1989, 2001, 2011
