= Daukšai =

- Village
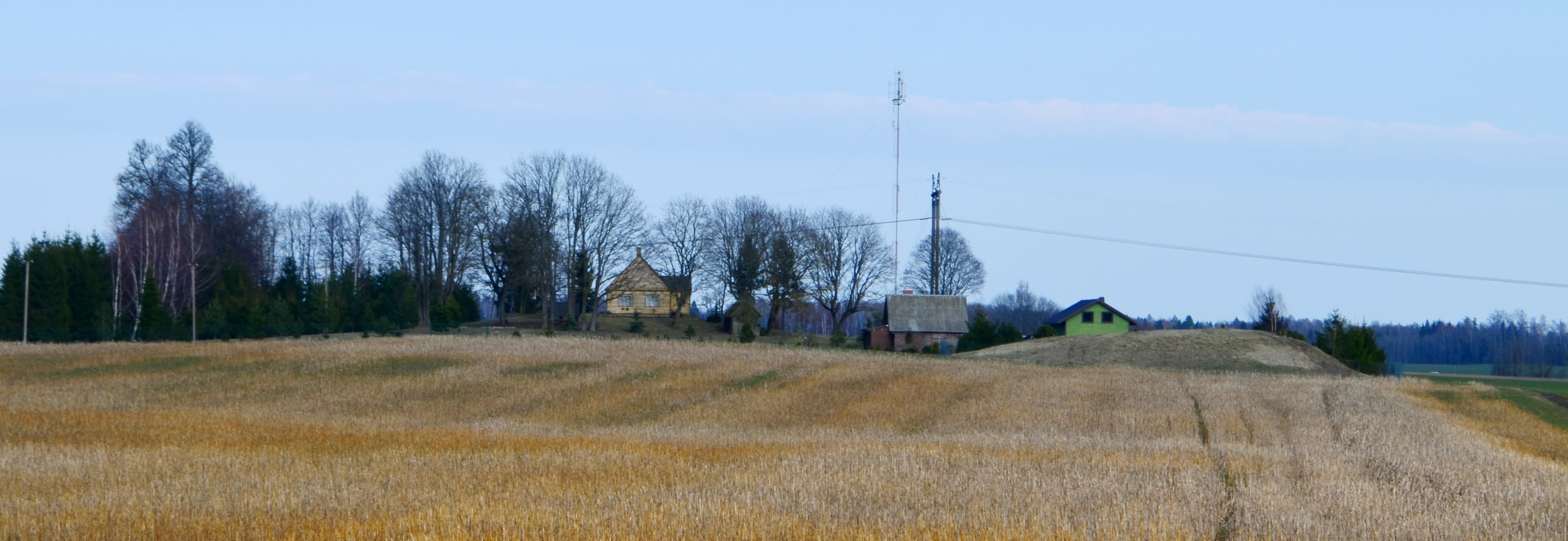

- Location in Lithuania Daukšai (Lithuania)
- Coordinates: 55°11′31″N 23°37′08″E
- Country: Lithuania
- County: Kaunas County
- Municipality: Kėdainiai district municipality
- Eldership: Pernarava Eldership

Population (2011)
  - Total: 0
- Time zone: UTC+2 (EET)
  - Summer (DST): UTC+3 (EEST)

Daukšai (formerly Polish: Dauksze) is a village in Kėdainiai district municipality, in Kaunas County, in central Lithuania. According to the 2011 census, the village was uninhabited. It is located 3 kilometres (1.9 mi) from Paaluonys, nearby the A1 highway and the Žvaranta river.

It was an estate of the Zaleski family at the beginning of the 20th century.

== Demography ==
Historical population

| Year | Pop. | ±% p.a. |
|---|---|---|
| 1923 | 11 | — |
| 1959 | 29 | +2.73% |
| 1970 | 11 | −8.44% |
| 1979 | 9 | −2.21% |

| Year | Pop. | ±% p.a. |
|---|---|---|
| 1989 | 2 | −13.96% |
| 2001 | 2 | +0.00% |
| 2011 | 0 | −100.00% |

Source: 1902, 1923, 1959 & 1970, 1979, 1989, 2001, 2011
