= Šliužiai, Kėdainiai =

Šliužiai
- Village
- Location in Lithuania Šliužiai (Lithuania)
- Coordinates: 55°16′59″N 23°34′41″E
- Country: Lithuania
- County: Kaunas County
- Municipality: Kėdainiai district municipality
- Eldership: Pernarava Eldership

Population (2011)
  - Total: 0
- Time zone: UTC+2 (EET)
  - Summer (DST): UTC+3 (EEST)

Šliužiai is a village in Kėdainiai district municipality, in Kaunas County, in central Lithuania. According to the 2011 census, the village was uninhabited. It is located 3.5 kilometres (2.2 mi) from Pernarava, by the Gynėvė river.

It is a part of Šliužiai village, split from Raseiniai District Municipality during the Soviet era.

== Demography ==
Historical population

| Year | Pop. | ±% p.a. |
|---|---|---|
| 1959 | 9 | — |
| 1970 | 10 | +0.96% |
| 1979 | 10 | +0.00% |

| Year | Pop. | ±% p.a. |
|---|---|---|
| 1989 | 1 | −20.57% |
| 2001 | 0 | −100.00% |
| 2011 | 0 | 0.00% |

Source: 1902, 1923, 1959 & 1970, 1979, 1989, 2001, 2011
