= Preikapė =

- Village
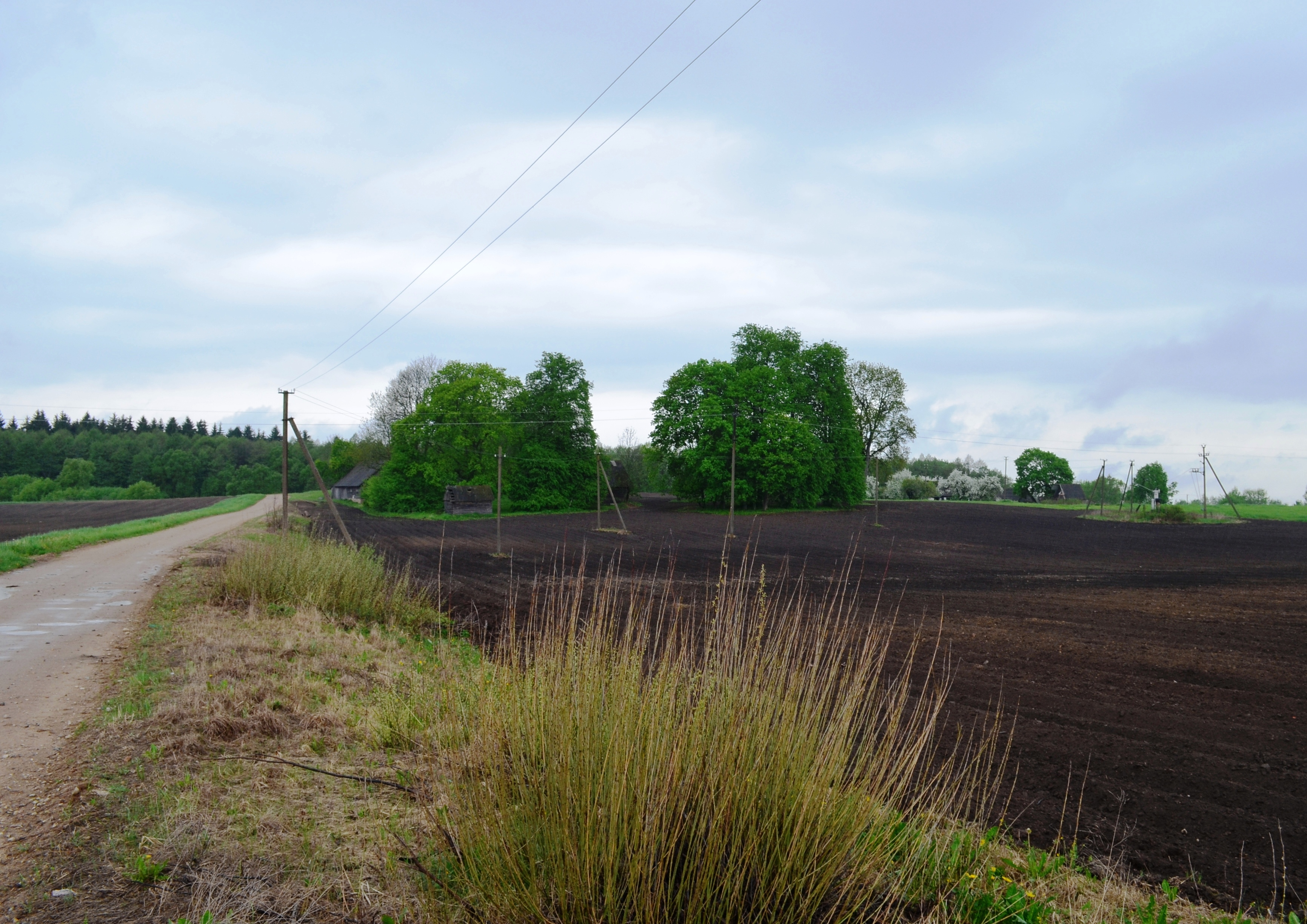

- Location in Lithuania Preikapė (Lithuania)
- Coordinates: 55°14′22″N 23°36′28″E
- Country: Lithuania
- County: Kaunas County
- Municipality: Kėdainiai district municipality
- Eldership: Pernarava Eldership

Population (2011)
  - Total: 35
- Time zone: UTC+2 (EET)
  - Summer (DST): UTC+3 (EEST)

Preikapė ('place by graves', formerly Russian: Прейкопе, Polish: Prejkopie) is a village in Kėdainiai district municipality, in Kaunas County, in central Lithuania. According to the 2011 census, the village had a population of 35 people. It is located 2.5 kilometres (1.6 mi) from Paaluonys, nearby a small forest and swamp. There is an ancient burial place. The southern part of the village is next to the Aluona river.

== Demography ==
Historical population

Year	Pop.	±% p.a.
1902	156	—
1923	210	+1.43%
1959	236	+0.32%
1970	176	−2.63%

Year	Pop.	±% p.a.
1979	104	−5.68%
1989	50	−7.06%
2001	35	−2.93%
2011	35	+0.00%

Source: 1902, 1923, 1959 & 1970, 1979, 1989, 2001, 2011

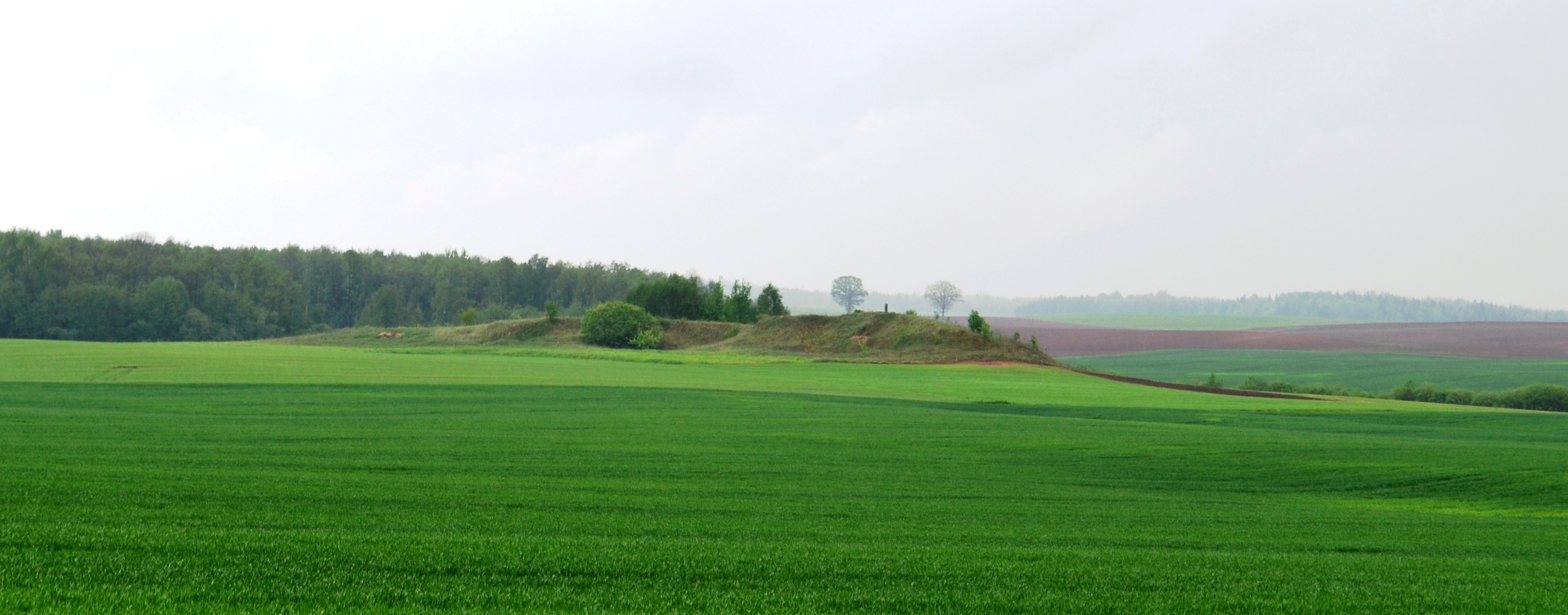
Preikapė burial place
