= Aukštkalniai, Kėdainiai =

Aukštkalniai
- Village
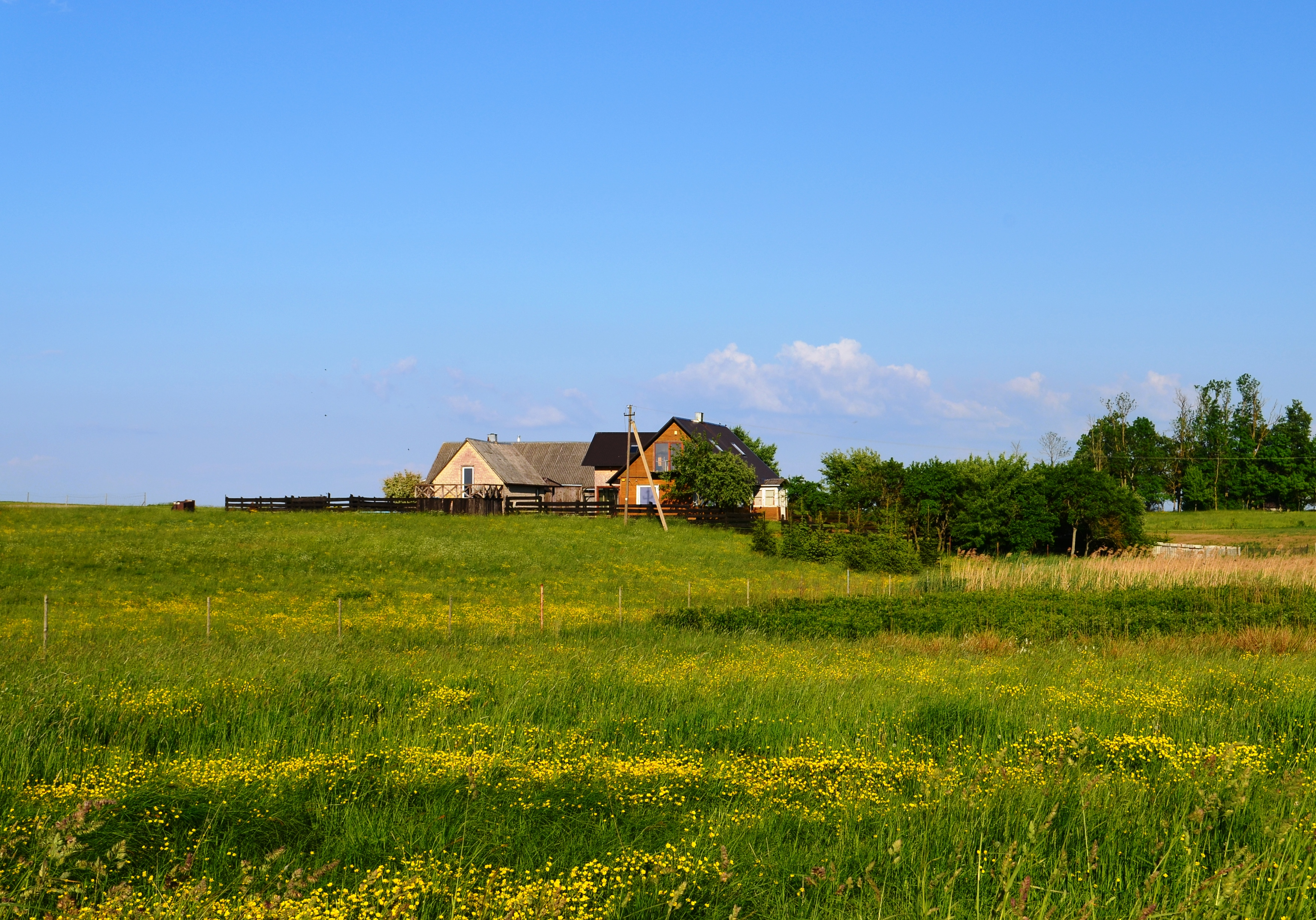

- Location in Lithuania Aukštkalniai (Lithuania)
- Coordinates: 55°10′0″N 23°35′0″E
- Country: Lithuania
- County: Kaunas County
- Municipality: Kėdainiai district municipality
- Eldership: Pernarava Eldership

Population (2011)
  - Total: 6
- Time zone: UTC+2 (EET)
  - Summer (DST): UTC+3 (EEST)

Aukštkalniai ('high mounts', formerly Russian: Аушкальне) is a village in Kėdainiai district municipality, in Kaunas County, in central Lithuania. According to the 2011 census, the village had a population of 6 people. It is located 1 kilometre (0.62 mi) from Langakiai, on a high hill, among the Žvaranta river, Langakiai ponds and Langakiai farm.

== Demography ==
Historical population

Year	Pop.	±% p.a.
1923	12	—
1959	67	+4.89%
1970	34	−5.98%
1979	8	−14.85%

Year	Pop.	±% p.a.
1989	4	−6.70%
2001	8	+5.95%
2011	6	−2.84%

Source: 1902, 1923, 1959 & 1970, 1979, 1989, 2001, 2011

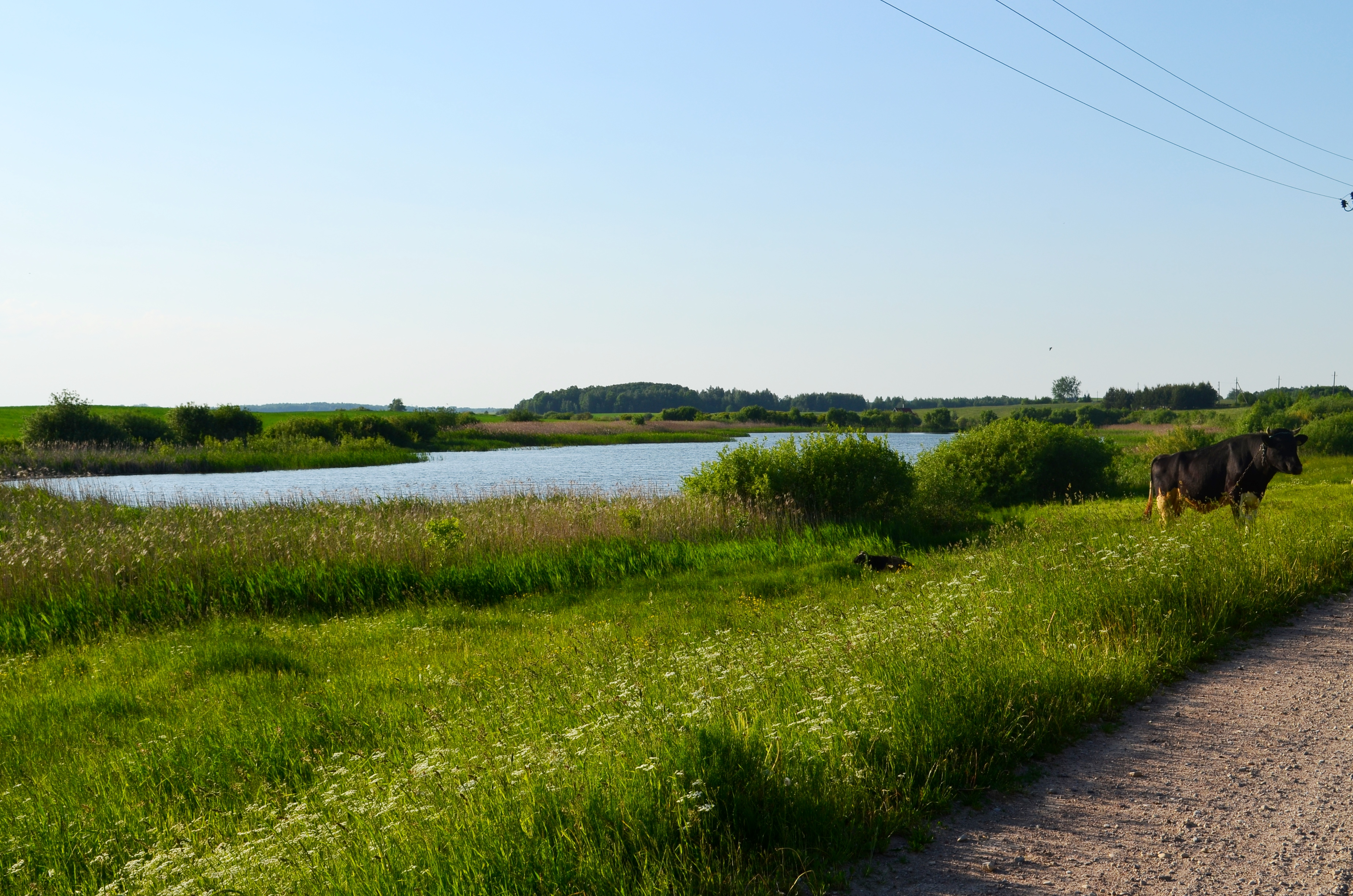
Langakiai 2nd pond in Aukštkalniai
