= Pesliškės =

- Village
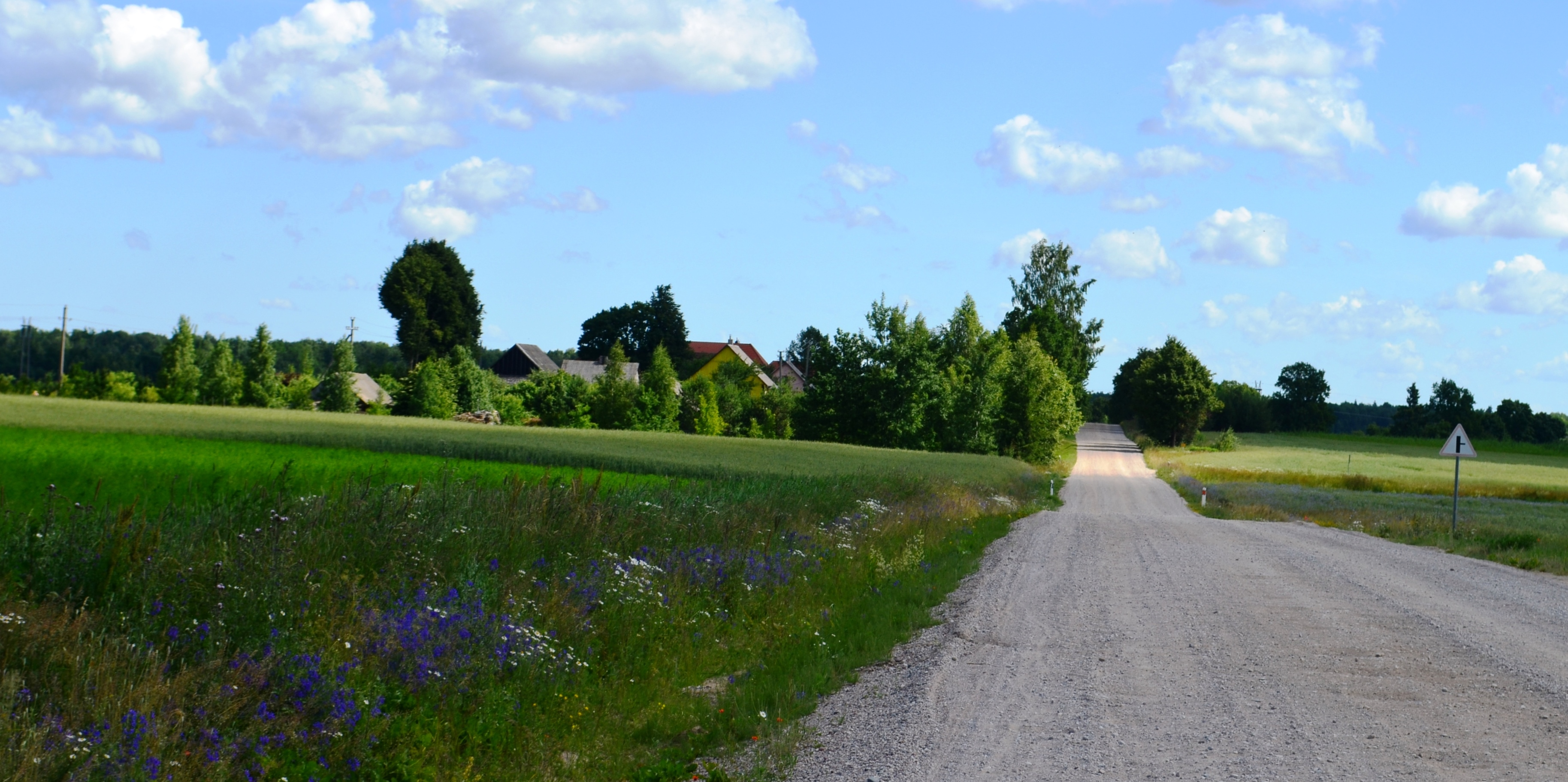

- Location in Lithuania Pesliškės (Lithuania)
- Coordinates: 55°10′52″N 23°37′30″E
- Country: Lithuania
- County: Kaunas County
- Municipality: Kėdainiai district municipality
- Eldership: Pernarava Eldership

Population (2011)
  - Total: 25
- Time zone: UTC+2 (EET)
  - Summer (DST): UTC+3 (EEST)

Pesliškės (formerly Russian: Песлишки) is a village in Kėdainiai district municipality, in Kaunas County, in central Lithuania. According to the 2011 census, the village had a population of 25 people. It is located 2.5 kilometres (1.6 mi) from Langakiai, by the Žvaranta river, nearby the A1 highway.

== Demography ==
Historical population

| Year | Pop. | ±% p.a. |
|---|---|---|
| 1902 | 28 | — |
| 1923 | 48 | +2.60% |
| 1959 | 51 | +0.17% |
| 1970 | 55 | +0.69% |

| Year | Pop. | ±% p.a. |
|---|---|---|
| 1979 | 32 | −5.84% |
| 1989 | 15 | −7.30% |
| 2001 | 37 | +7.81% |
| 2011 | 25 | −3.84% |

Source: 1902, 1923, 1959 & 1970, 1979, 1989, 2001, 2011

== Images ==
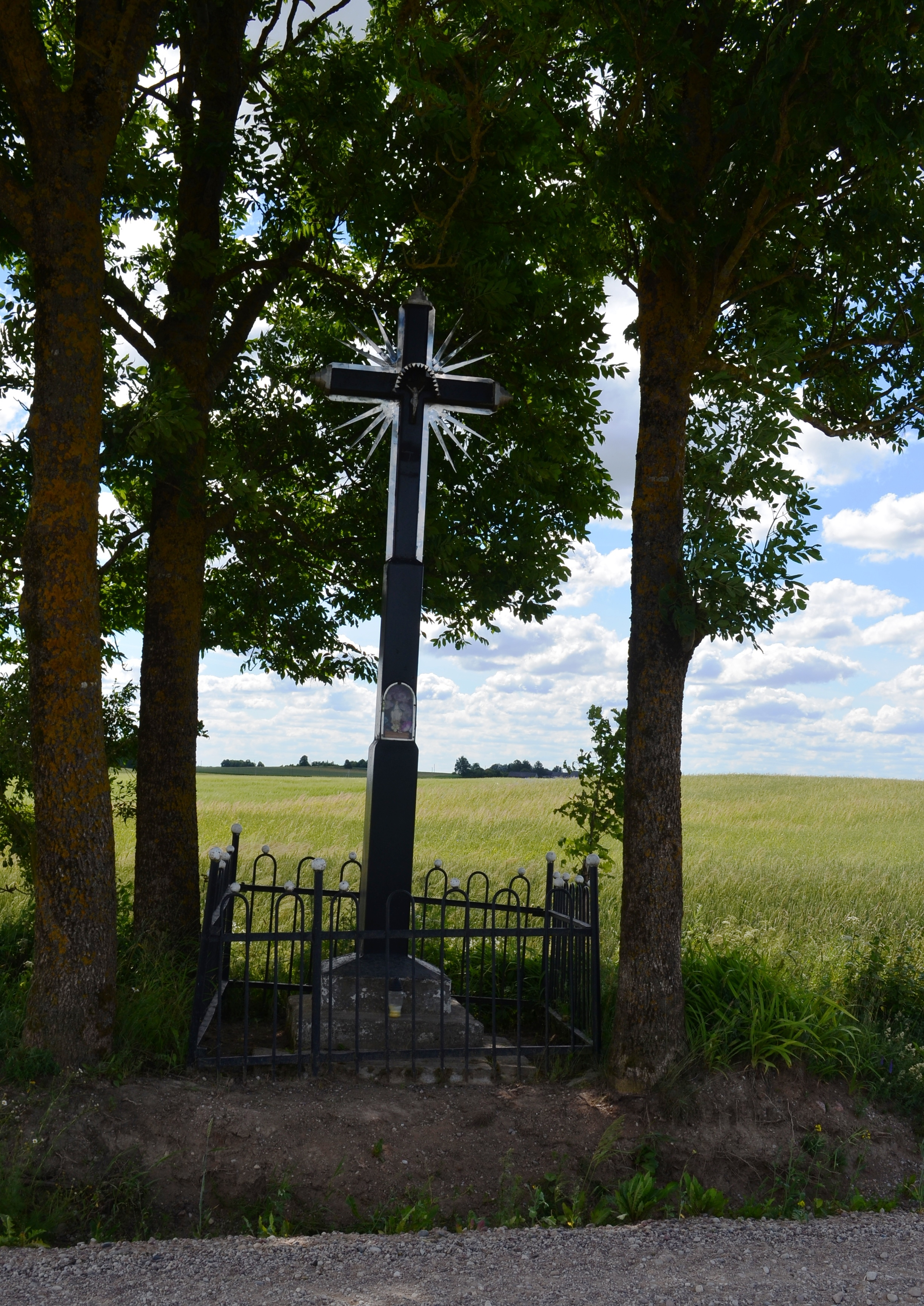
Wayside cross

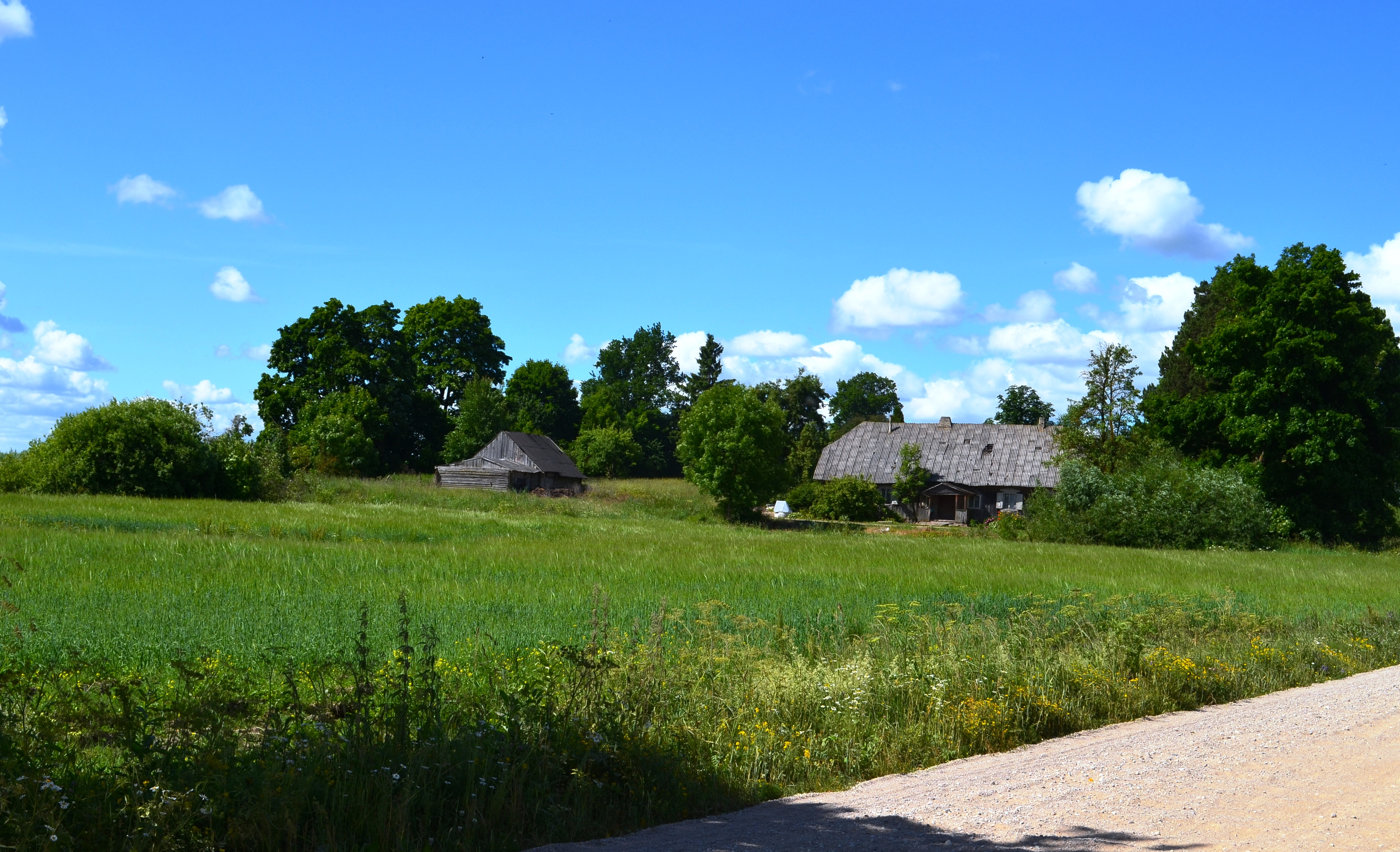
Traditional house in Pesliškės

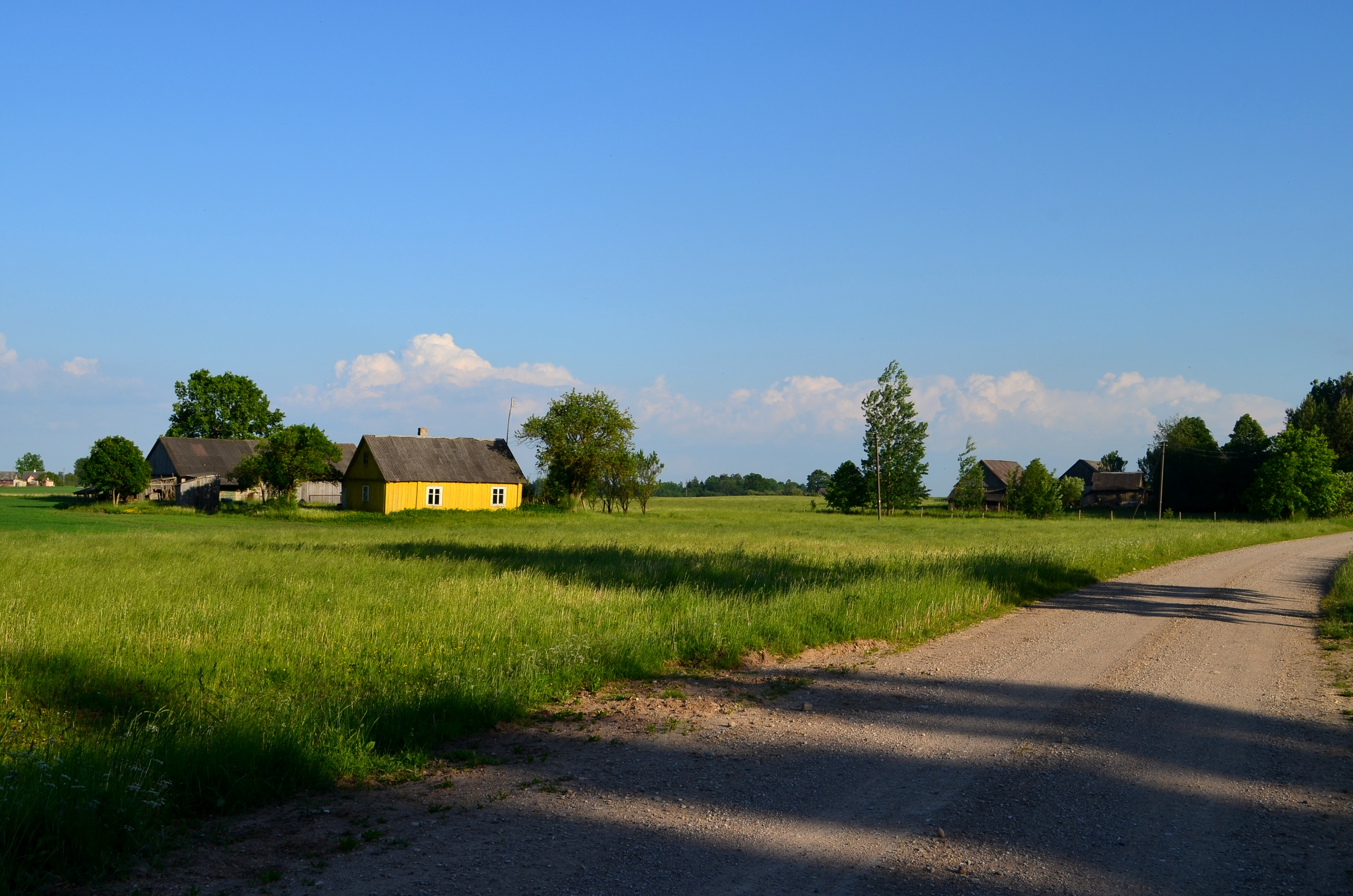
Pesliškės from Voskaičiai side
