= Bumbulynė =

- Village
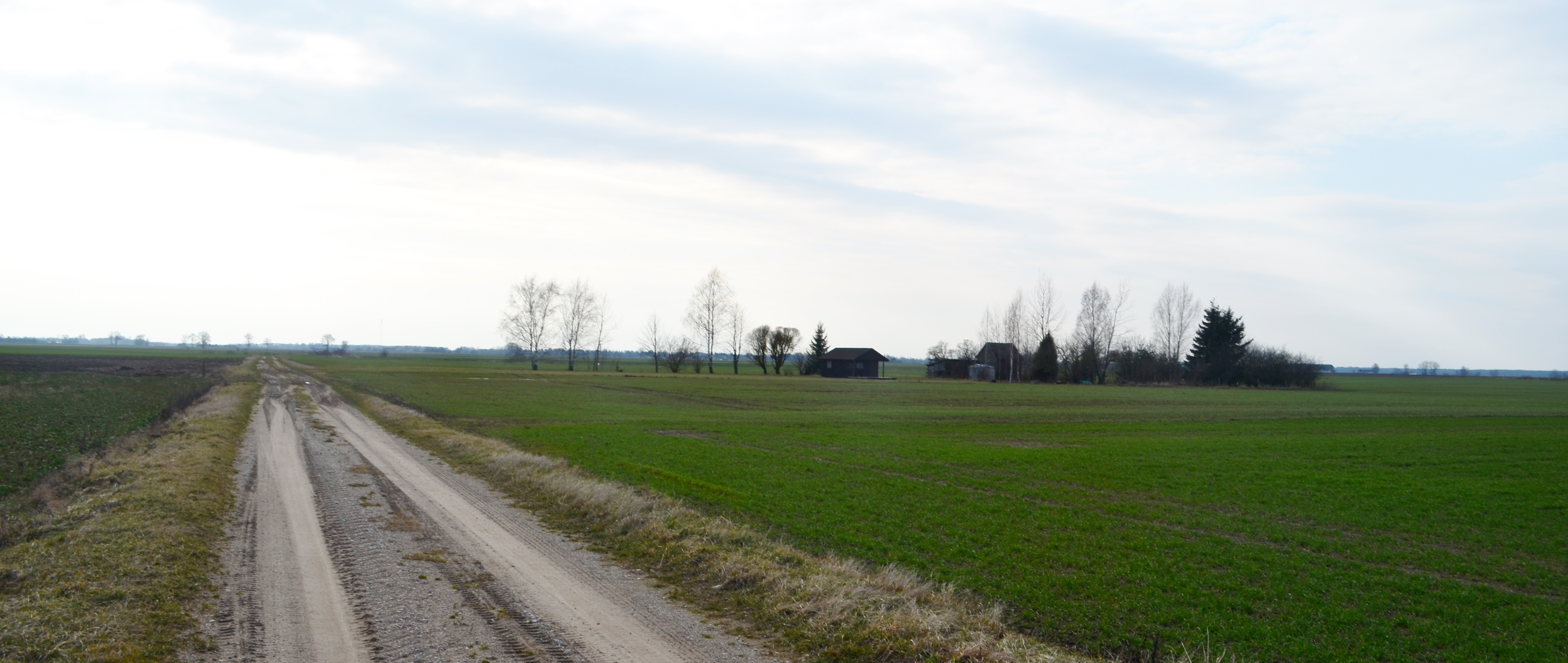

- Location in Lithuania Bumbulynė (Lithuania)
- Coordinates: 55°10′19″N 23°33′47″E
- Country: Lithuania
- County: Kaunas County
- Municipality: Kėdainiai district municipality
- Eldership: Pernarava Eldership

Population (2011)
  - Total: 0
- Time zone: UTC+2 (EET)
  - Summer (DST): UTC+3 (EEST)

Bumbulynė is a village in Kėdainiai district municipality, in Kaunas County, in central Lithuania. According to the 2011 census, the village was uninhabited. It is located 1 kilometre (0.62 mi) from Langakiai, by the Glaušė rivulet and its tributary Geršokas.

== Demography ==
Historical population

| Year | Pop. | ±% p.a. |
|---|---|---|
| 1923 | 38 | — |
| 1959 | 32 | −0.48% |
| 1970 | 27 | −1.53% |

| Year | Pop. | ±% p.a. |
|---|---|---|
| 2001 | 0 | −100.00% |
| 2011 | 0 | 0.00% |

Source: 1902, 1923, 1959 & 1970, 1979, 1989, 2001, 2011
