= Laučynė =

- Village
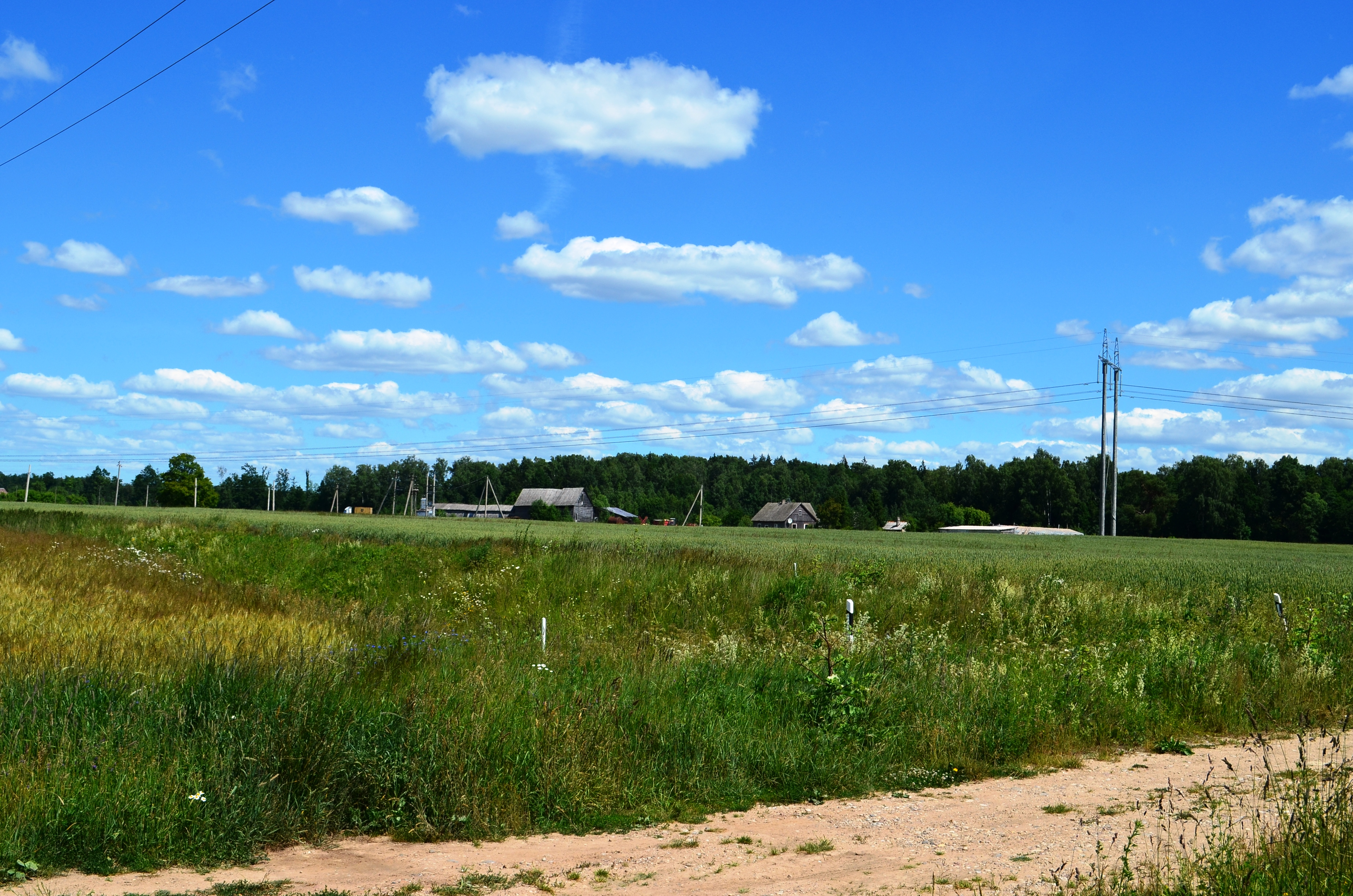

- Location in Lithuania Laučynė (Lithuania)
- Coordinates: 55°10′00″N 23°40′00″E
- Country: Lithuania
- County: Kaunas County
- Municipality: Kėdainiai district municipality
- Eldership: Pernarava Eldership

Population (2011)
  - Total: 1
- Time zone: UTC+2 (EET)
  - Summer (DST): UTC+3 (EEST)

Laučynė (formerly Russian: Ловчины, Polish: Łowczynie) is a village in Kėdainiai district municipality, in Kaunas County, in central Lithuania. According to the 2011 census, the village had a population of 1 person. It is located 5 kilometres (3.1 mi) from Langakiai, by the Juodupis river, the Pernarava-Šaravai Forest and the A1 highway. The Laučynė Landscape Sanctuary is located nearby.

== Demography ==
Historical population

| Year | Pop. | ±% p.a. |
|---|---|---|
| 1902 | 12 | — |
| 1923 | 32 | +4.78% |
| 1959 | 27 | −0.47% |
| 1970 | 32 | +1.56% |

| Year | Pop. | ±% p.a. |
|---|---|---|
| 1979 | 17 | −6.79% |
| 1989 | 4 | −13.47% |
| 2001 | 2 | −5.61% |
| 2011 | 1 | −6.70% |

Source: 1902, 1923, 1959 & 1970, 1979, 1989, 2001, 2011
