= Gučkampis =

- Village
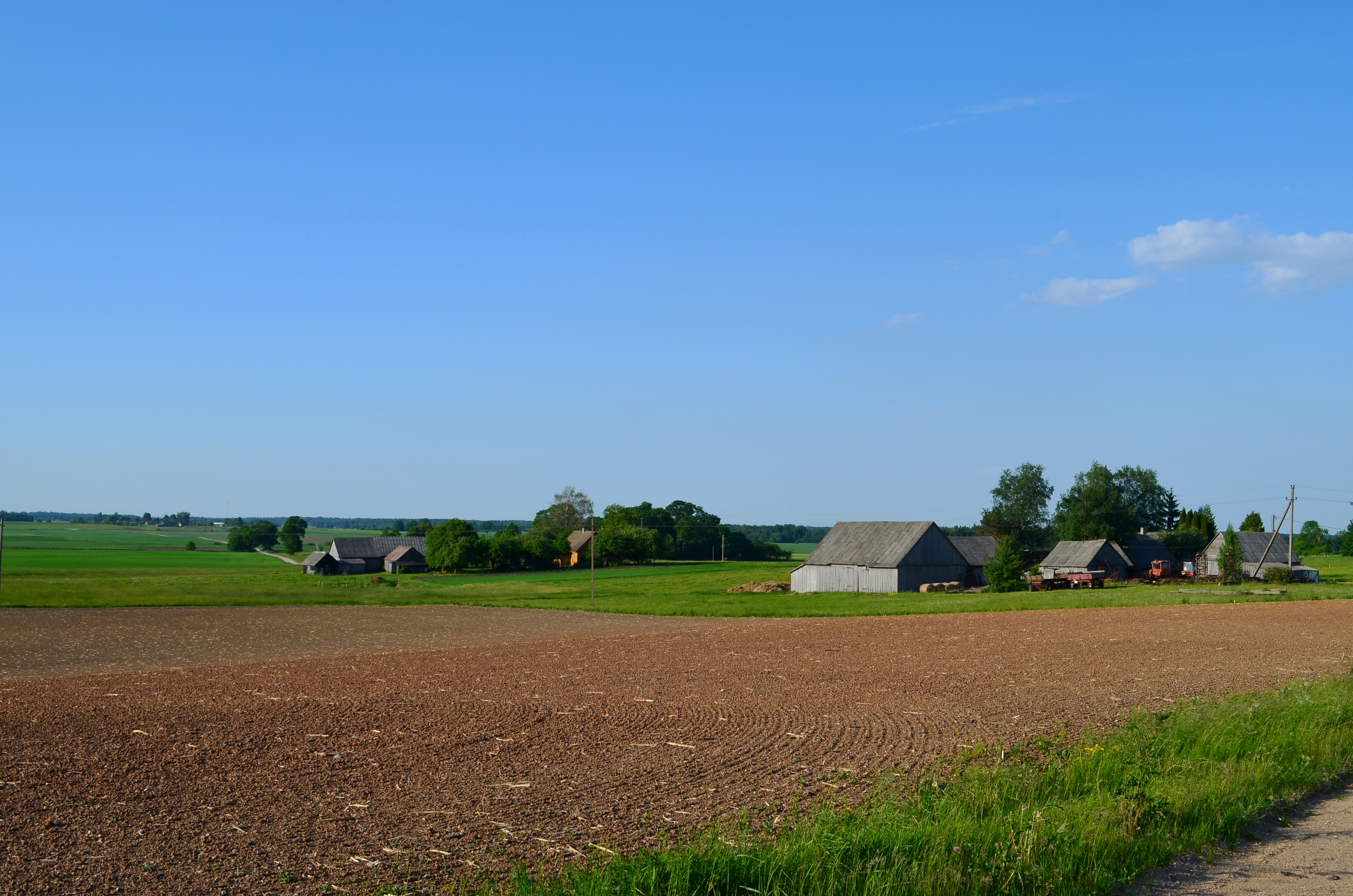

- Location in Lithuania Gučkampis (Lithuania)
- Coordinates: 55°09′50″N 23°36′50″E
- Country: Lithuania
- County: Kaunas County
- Municipality: Kėdainiai district municipality
- Eldership: Pernarava Eldership

Population (2011)
  - Total: 24
- Time zone: UTC+2 (EET)
  - Summer (DST): UTC+3 (EEST)

Gučkampis (formerly Russian: Гучкомпе, Polish: Guczkompie) is a village in Kėdainiai district municipality, in Kaunas County, in central Lithuania. According to the 2011 census, the village had a population of 24 people. It is located 1 kilometre (0.62 mi) from Liučiūnai, on a high hill. The village contains an old cemetery.

== History ==
A stone axe with a narrowing butt was found in the village. Gučkampis is recorded from 1609. In the eighteenth century, it was a royal holding.

An inventory begun on 29 July 1771 and completed on 1 August recorded 14 peasant holdings, each assigned one valakas of land. A further four valakai were listed as vacant, making a total of 18. Each holding owed two days of corvée labour per week; the inventory table recorded a combined weekly obligation of 28 labour days. Among the listed householders was the village headman, identified in the document as Michał Czyżewski (Lith. Mykolas Čižauskas)

The holding was administered by Jurgis Liaudanskas, marshal of Raseiniai. In 1775, he was recorded as still holding 22 peasant households in Gučkampis.

In 1923, the village had 43 households.

Gučkampis served as the administrative centre of the Gučkampis apylinkė in 1950–1954 and 1963–1968.

In 2020, the village of Vencloviškiai was incorporated into Gučkampis.

== Demography ==
Historical population

Year	Pop.	±% p.a.
1820	138	—
1902	224	+0.59%
1923	253	+0.58%
1959	202	−0.62%
1970	153	−2.49%

Year	Pop.	±% p.a.
1979	71	−8.18%
1985	25	−15.97%
1989	13	−15.08%
2001	21	+4.08%
2011	24	+1.34%

Source: 1902, 1923, 1959 & 1970, 1979, 1989, 2001, 2011
