= Gegužiai, Kėdainiai =

Gegužiai
- Village
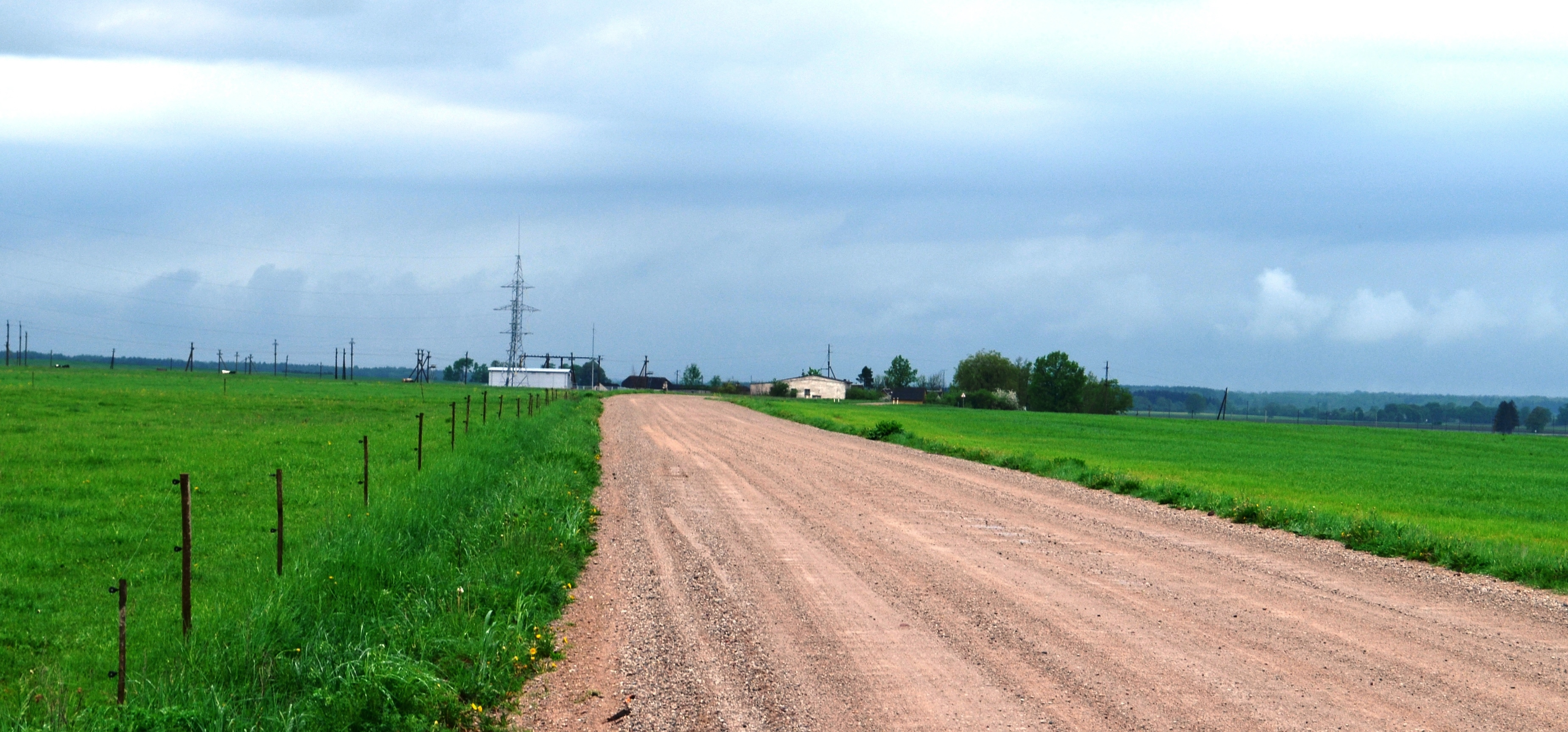

- Location in Lithuania Gegužiai (Lithuania)
- Coordinates: 55°16′01″N 23°37′59″E
- Country: Lithuania
- County: Kaunas County
- Municipality: Kėdainiai district municipality
- Eldership: Pernarava Eldership

Population (2011)
  - Total: 0
- Time zone: UTC+2 (EET)
  - Summer (DST): UTC+3 (EEST)

Gegužiai (formerly Russian: Гегужи, Polish: Gieguże) is a village in Kėdainiai district municipality, in Kaunas County, in central Lithuania. According to the 2011 census, the village was uninhabited. It is located 1 kilometre (0.62 mi) from Pernarava, by the Josvainiai-Ariogala road, nearby the source of the Liedas river.

It was an okolica (a property of the Marcinkevičiai, Urnėžiai, Alevsiai, Mosevičiai families) at the beginning of the 20th century.

== Demography ==
Historical population

Year	Pop.	±% p.a.
1923	45	—
1959	46	+0.06%
1970	20	−7.29%
1979	5	−14.28%

Year	Pop.	±% p.a.
1989	1	−14.87%
2001	5	+14.35%
2011	0	−100.00%

Source: 1902, 1923, 1959 & 1970, 1979, 1989, 2001, 2011
