= Pavinkšniai, Kėdainiai =

Pavinkšniai
- Village
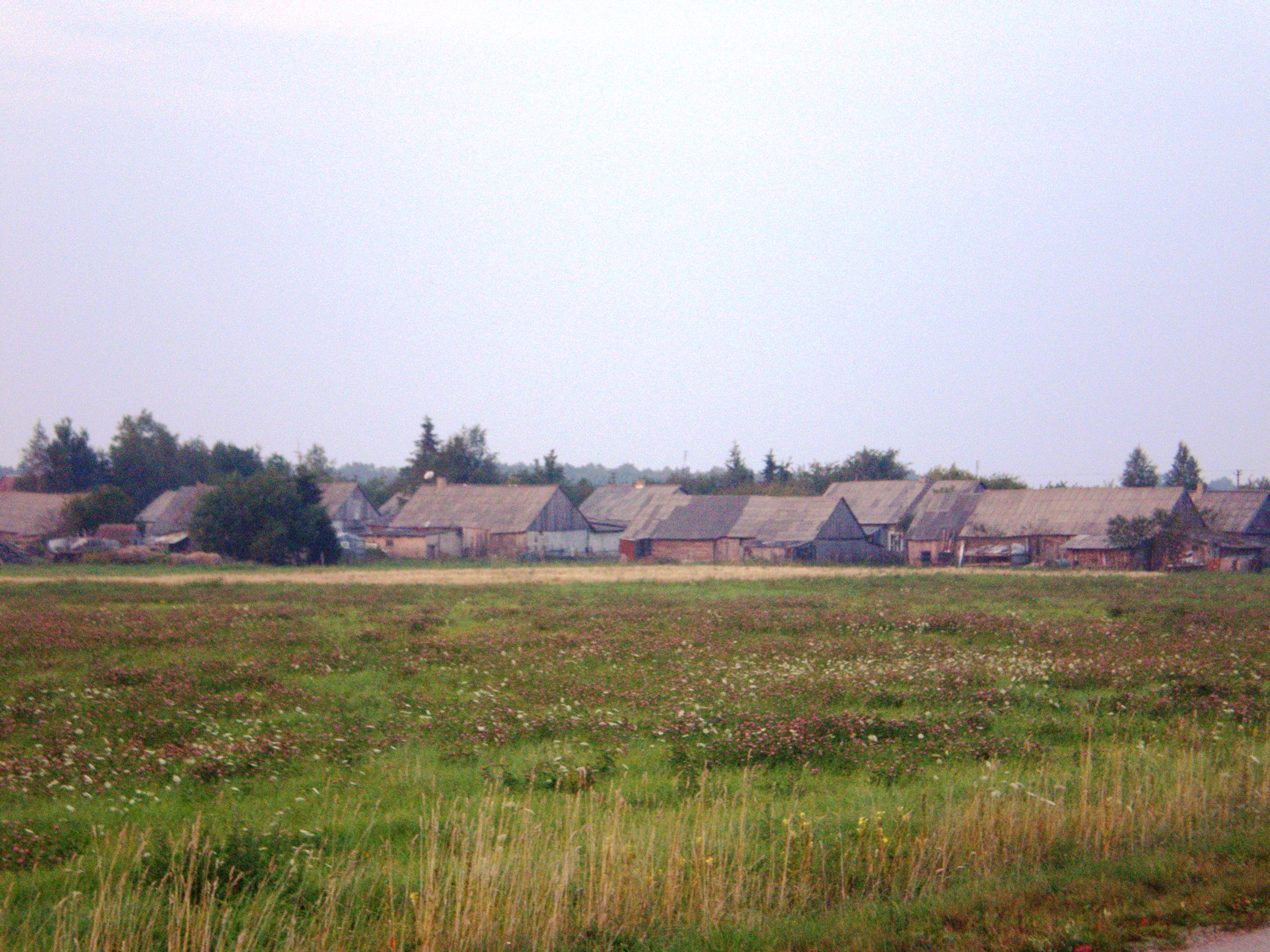

- Location in Lithuania Pavinkšniai (Lithuania)
- Coordinates: 55°16′59″N 23°39′50″E
- Country: Lithuania
- County: Kaunas County
- Municipality: Kėdainiai district municipality
- Eldership: Pernarava Eldership

Population (2011)
  - Total: 17
- Time zone: UTC+2 (EET)
  - Summer (DST): UTC+3 (EEST)

Pavinkšniai (formerly Russian: Повинкшне, Polish: Powinksznie) is a village in Kėdainiai district municipality, in Kaunas County, in central Lithuania. According to the 2011 census, the village had a population of 17 people. It is located 2.5 kilometres (1.6 mi) from Pernarava, by the Žemėplėša rivulet and the Josvainiai-Ariogala road.

== Demography ==
Historical population

| Year | Pop. | ±% p.a. |
|---|---|---|
| 1923 | 153 | — |
| 1959 | 131 | −0.43% |
| 1970 | 59 | −6.99% |
| 1979 | 60 | +0.19% |

| Year | Pop. | ±% p.a. |
|---|---|---|
| 1989 | 39 | −4.22% |
| 2001 | 31 | −1.89% |
| 2011 | 17 | −5.83% |

Source: 1902, 1923, 1959 & 1970, 1979, 1989, 2001, 2011
