= Žostautėliai =

- Village
- Location in Lithuania Žostautėliai (Lithuania)
- Coordinates: 55°18′56″N 23°36′42″E
- Country: Lithuania
- County: Kaunas County
- Municipality: Kėdainiai district municipality
- Eldership: Pernarava Eldership

Population (2011)
  - Total: 0
- Time zone: UTC+2 (EET)
  - Summer (DST): UTC+3 (EEST)

Žostautėliai is a village in Kėdainiai district municipality, in Kaunas County, in central Lithuania. According to the 2011 census, the village was uninhabited. It is located 4 kilometres (2.5 mi) from Pernarava, 1 kilometre (0.62 mi) from Žostautai, next to the Lapkalnys-Paliepiai Forest.

== Demography ==
Historical population

Year	Pop.	±% p.a.
1989	0	—
2001	0	0.00%

Year	Pop.	±% p.a.
2011	0	0.00%

Source: 1902, 1923, 1959 & 1970, 1979, 1989, 2001, 2011
