= Mantigailiai =

- Village
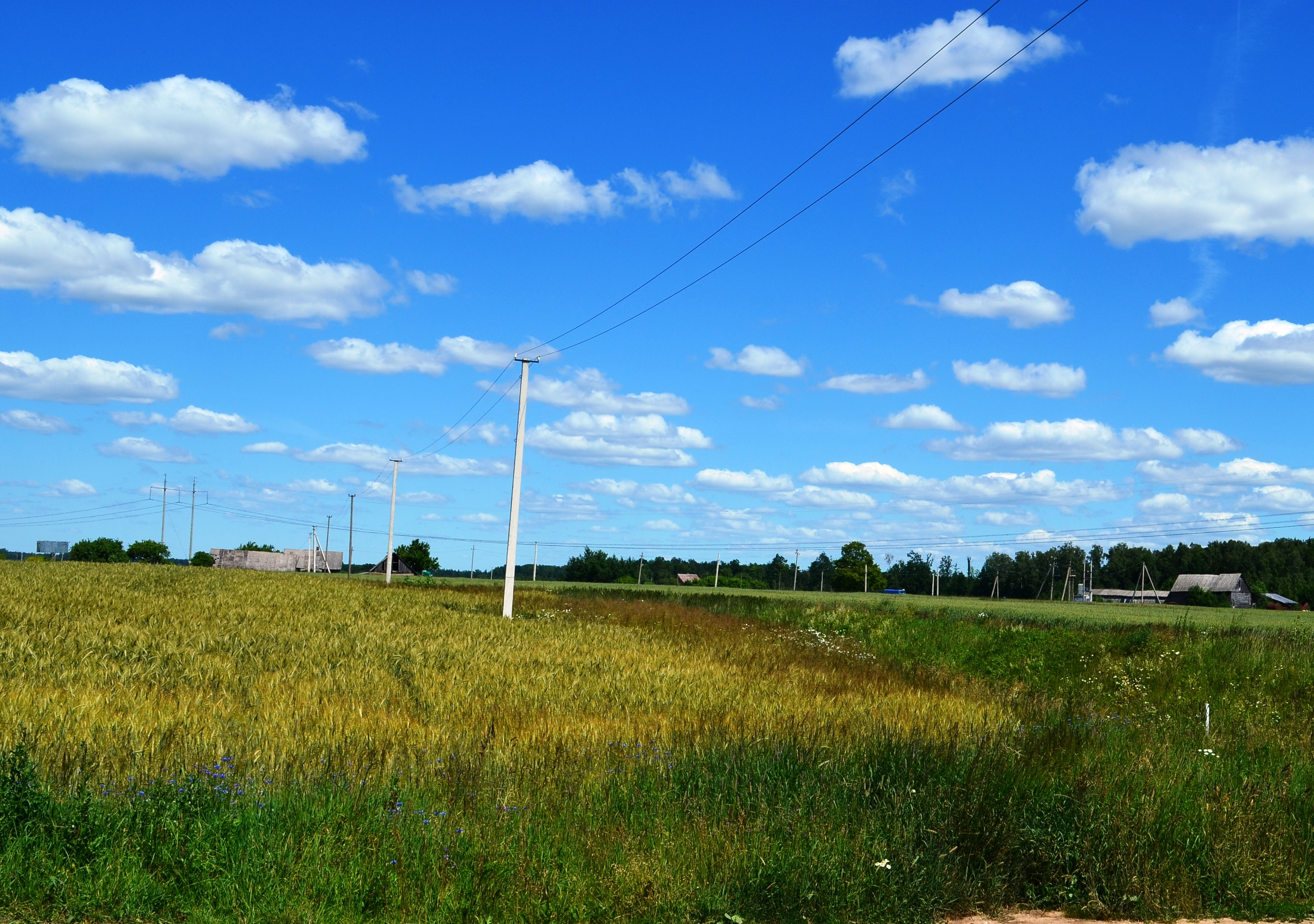

- Location in Lithuania Mantigailiai (Lithuania)
- Coordinates: 55°10′30″N 23°39′11″E
- Country: Lithuania
- County: Kaunas County
- Municipality: Kėdainiai district municipality
- Eldership: Pernarava Eldership

Population (2011)
  - Total: 10
- Time zone: UTC+2 (EET)
  - Summer (DST): UTC+3 (EEST)

Mantigailiai is a village in Kėdainiai district municipality, in Kaunas County, in central Lithuania. According to the 2011 census, the village had a population of 10 people. It is located 4 kilometres (2.5 mi) from Langakiai, nearby the Juodupis river and the A1 highway.

== Demography ==
Historical population

Year	Pop.	±% p.a.
1959	99	—
1970	70	−3.10%
1979	33	−8.02%

Year	Pop.	±% p.a.
1989	5	−17.20%
2001	12	+7.57%
2011	10	−1.81%

Source: 1902, 1923, 1959 & 1970, 1979, 1989, 2001, 2011
