= Blandžiai =

- Village
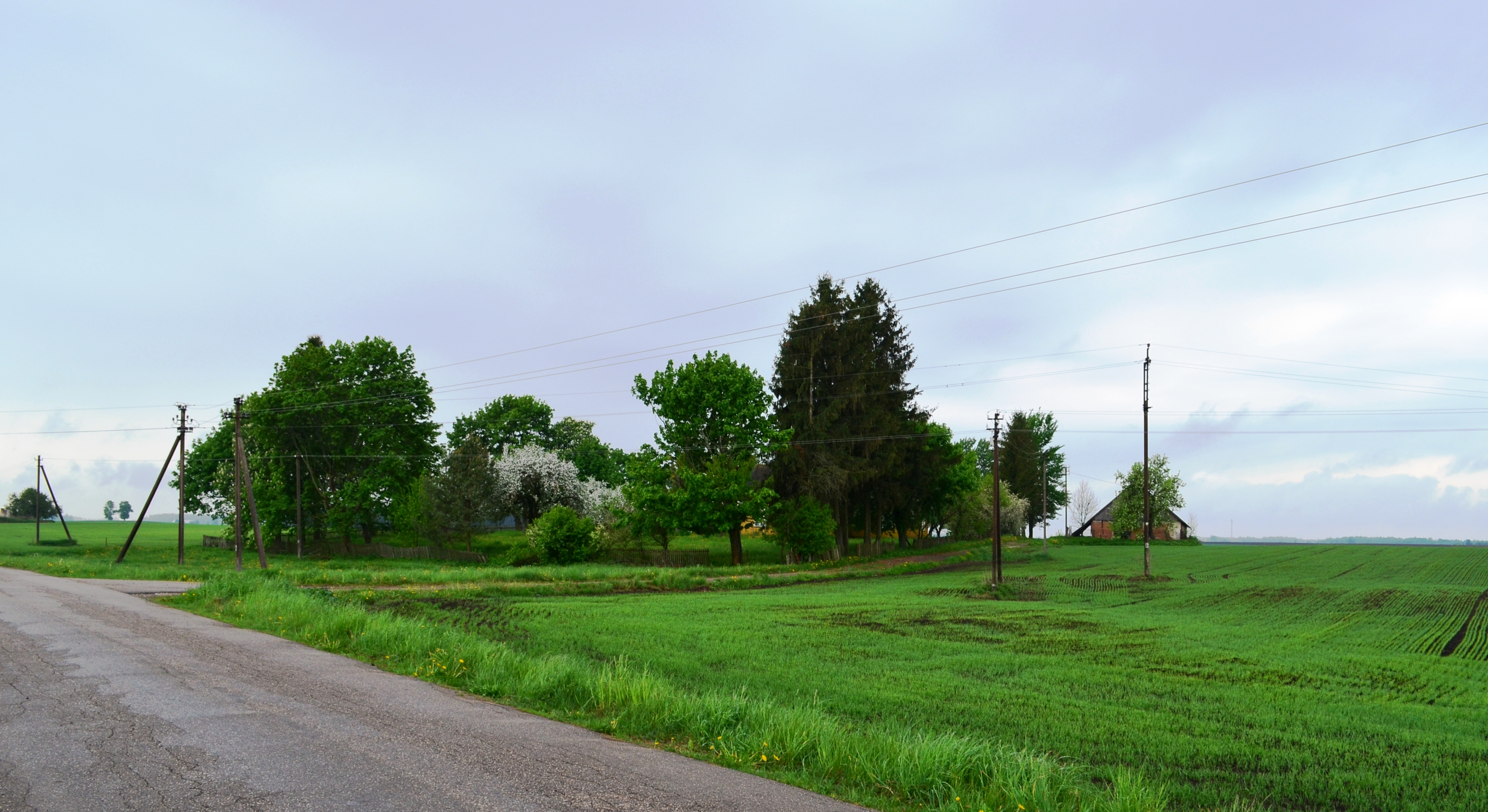

- Location in Lithuania Blandžiai (Lithuania)
- Coordinates: 55°14′31″N 23°38′20″E
- Country: Lithuania
- County: Kaunas County
- Municipality: Kėdainiai district municipality
- Eldership: Pernarava Eldership

Population (2011)
  - Total: 29
- Time zone: UTC+2 (EET)
  - Summer (DST): UTC+3 (EEST)

Blandžiai (formerly Russian: Бландзе, Polish: Błandzie) is a village in Kėdainiai district municipality, in Kaunas County, in central Lithuania. According to the 2011 census, the village had a population of 29 people. It is located 3 kilometres (1.9 mi) from Pernarava, nearby the source of the Sakuona river. There is a farm.

== Demography ==
Historical population

Year	Pop.	±% p.a.
1902	101	—
1923	169	+2.48%
1959	158	−0.19%
1970	113	−3.00%

Year	Pop.	±% p.a.
1979	70	−5.18%
1989	28	−8.76%
2001	42	+3.44%
2011	29	−3.64%

Source: 1902, 1923, 1959 & 1970, 1979, 1989, 2001, 2011

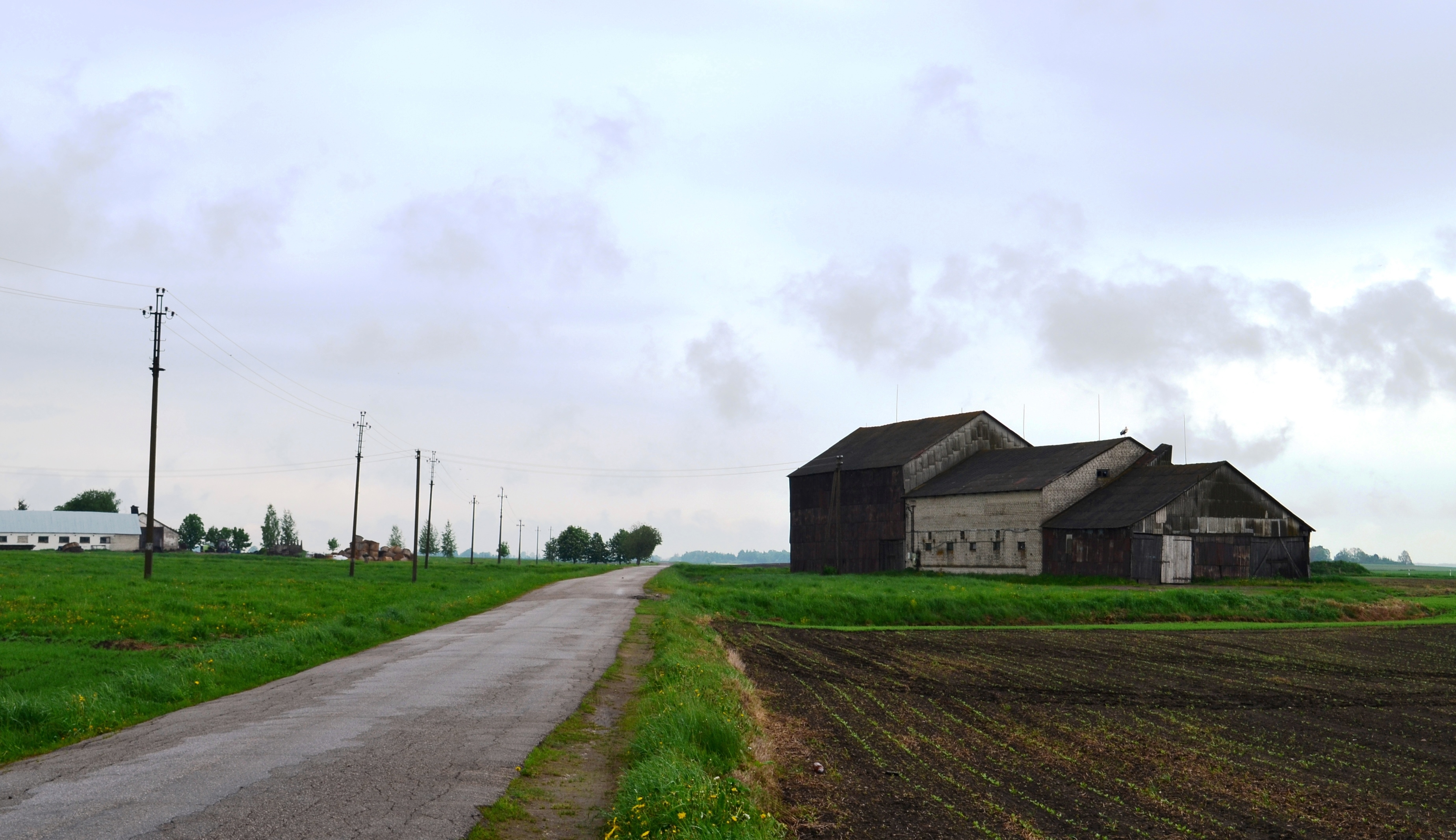
Blandžiai farm's warehouses
