= Pelutava =

- Village
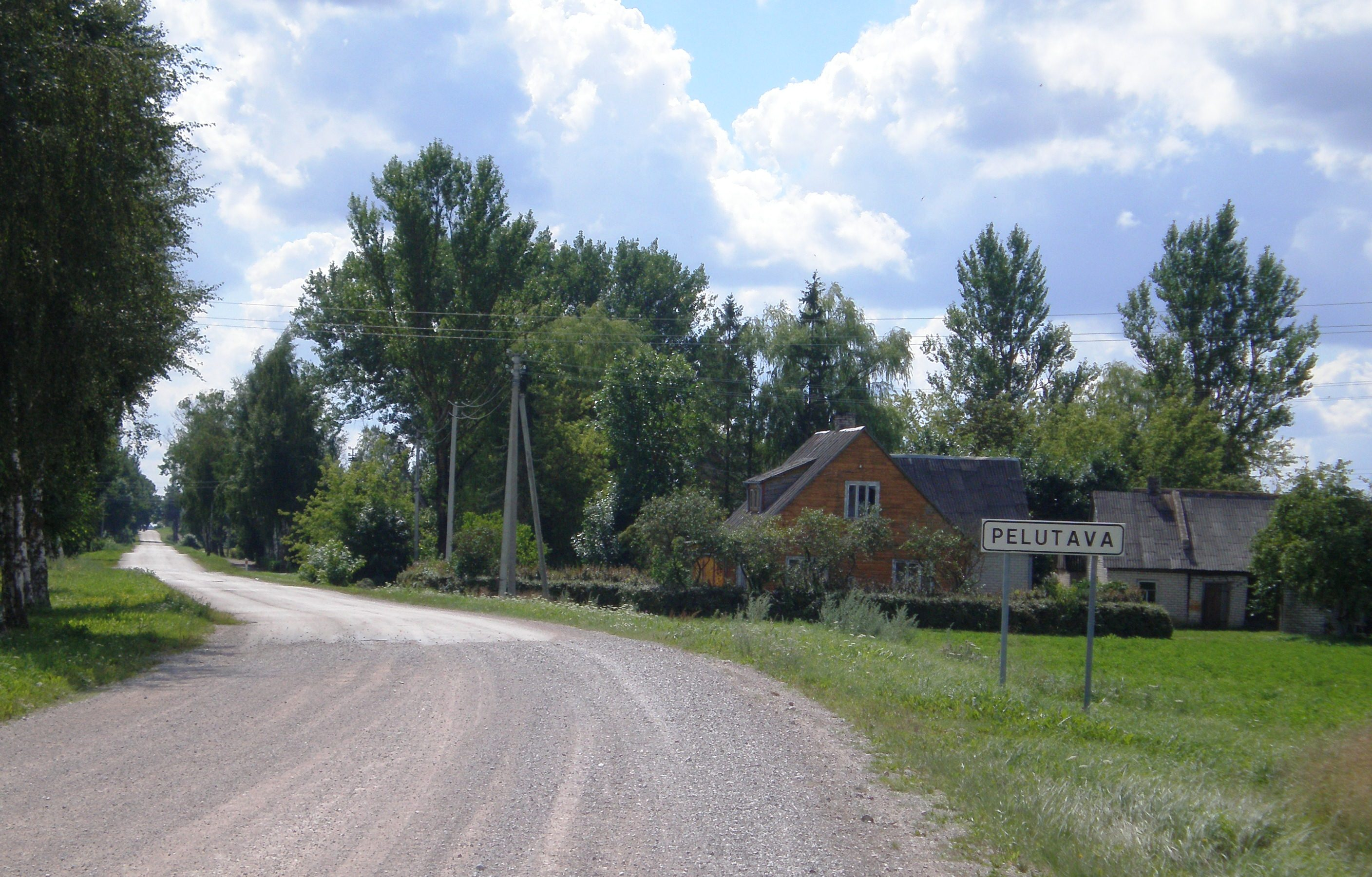

- Location in Lithuania Pelutava (Lithuania)
- Coordinates: 55°15′50″N 23°40′52″E
- Country: Lithuania
- County: Kaunas County
- Municipality: Kėdainiai district municipality
- Eldership: Pernarava Eldership

Population (2011)
  - Total: 179
- Time zone: UTC+2 (EET)
  - Summer (DST): UTC+3 (EEST)

Pelutava (formerly Russian: Пелутово, Polish: Piełutowo) is a village in Kėdainiai district municipality, in Kaunas County, in central Lithuania. According to the 2011 census, the village had a population of 179 people. It is located 2.5 kilometres (1.6 mi) from Pernarava, by the Liedas river. There is a library.

== History ==
Pelutava has been known since 1590. At the 18th century it was a royal village in Vilkija eldership. During the Soviet era Pelutava was the "Salomėja Nėris" kolkhoz center.

== Demography ==
Historical population

Year	Pop.	±% p.a.
1824	254	—
1902	339	+0.37%
1923	347	+0.11%
1959	322	−0.21%
1970	269	−1.62%

Year	Pop.	±% p.a.
1979	283	+0.57%
1986	287	+0.20%
1989	248	−4.75%
2001	239	−0.31%
2011	179	−2.85%

Source: 1902, 1923, 1959 & 1970, 1979, 1989, 2001, 2011
