= Voskaičiai =

- Village
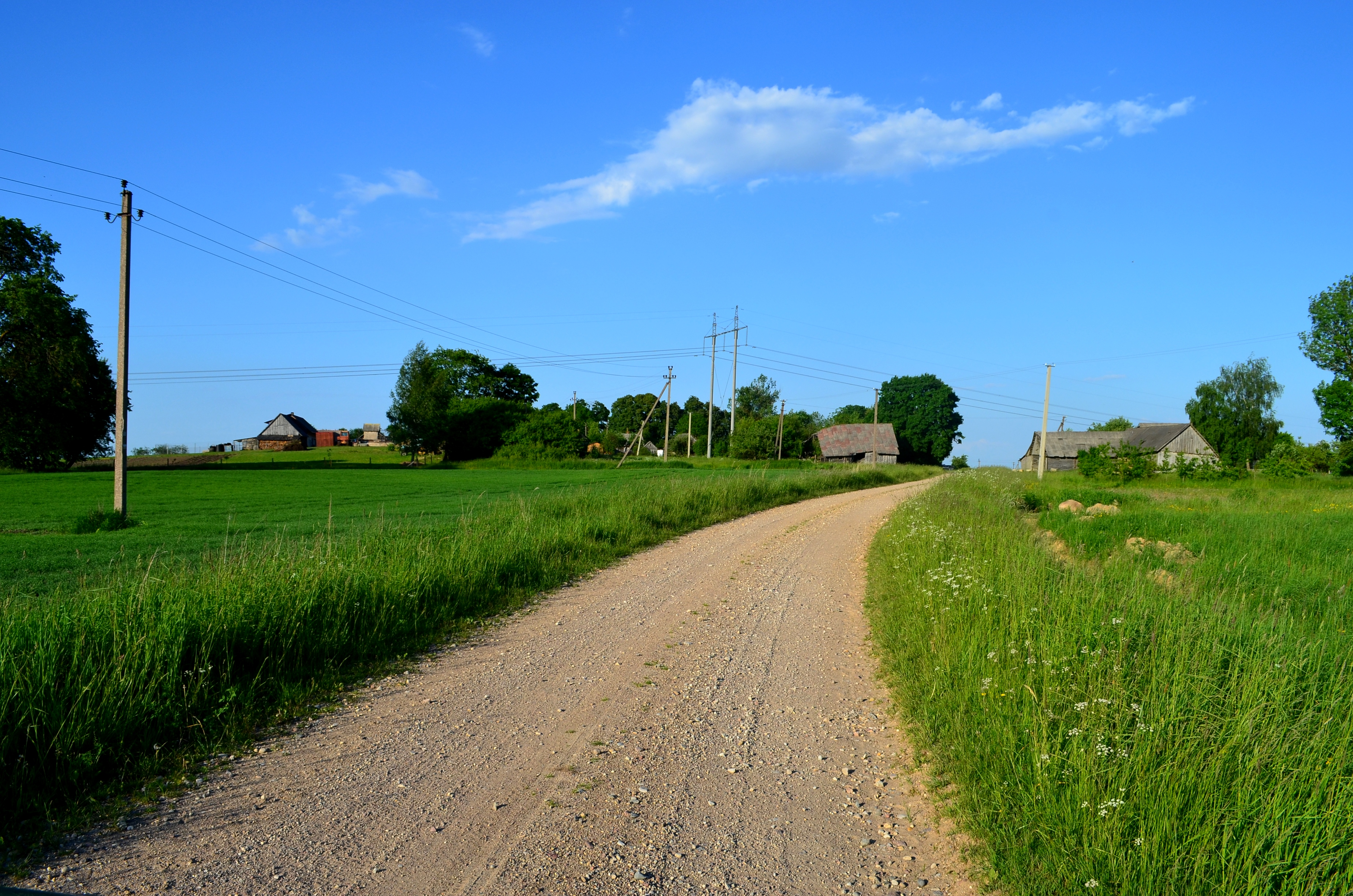

- Location in Lithuania Voskaičiai (Lithuania)
- Coordinates: 55°12′00″N 23°36′29″E
- Country: Lithuania
- County: Kaunas County
- Municipality: Kėdainiai district municipality
- Eldership: Pernarava Eldership

Population (2011)
  - Total: 10
- Time zone: UTC+2 (EET)
  - Summer (DST): UTC+3 (EEST)

Voskaičiai (formerly Russian: Воскайце, Polish: Woskańce) is a village in Kėdainiai district municipality, in Kaunas County, in central Lithuania. According to the 2011 census, the village had a population of 10 people. It is located 2 kilometres (1.2 mi) from Paaluonys, next to the A1 highway.

There was Voskaičiai okolica at the end of the 19th century.

== Demography ==
Historical population

Year	Pop.	±% p.a.
1902	120	—
1923	132	+0.45%
1959	121	−0.24%
1970	109	−0.94%

Year	Pop.	±% p.a.
1979	46	−9.14%
1989	23	−6.70%
2001	24	+0.36%
2011	10	−8.38%

Source: 1902, 1923, 1959 & 1970, 1979, 1989, 2001, 2011

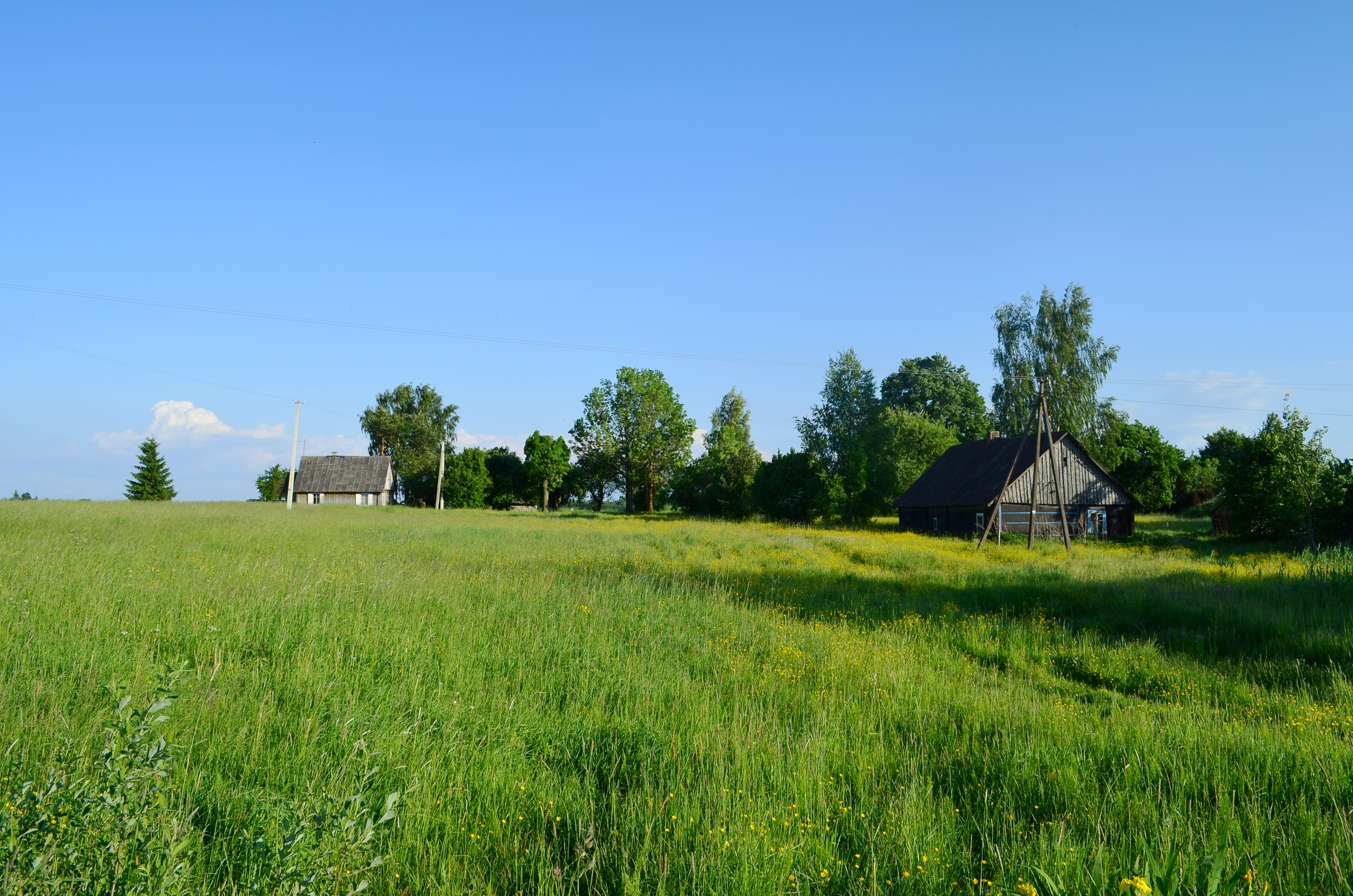
Traditional wooden architecture in Voskaičiai
