= Jakšiai =

- Village
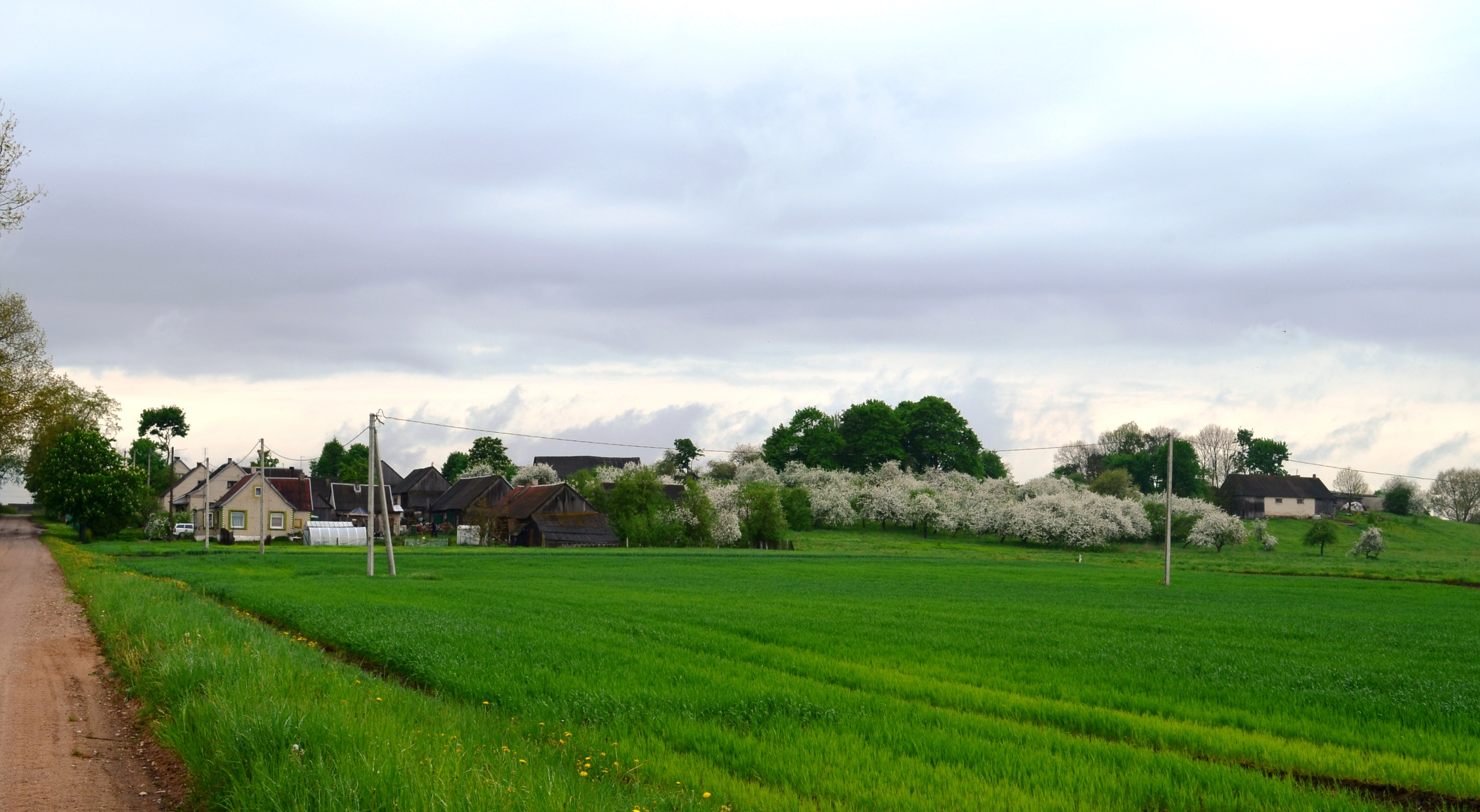

- Location in Lithuania Jakšiai (Lithuania)
- Coordinates: 55°14′20″N 23°41′10″E
- Country: Lithuania
- County: Kaunas County
- Municipality: Kėdainiai district municipality
- Eldership: Pernarava Eldership

Population (2011)
  - Total: 138
- Time zone: UTC+2 (EET)
  - Summer (DST): UTC+3 (EEST)

Jakšiai (formerly Russian: Якши, Polish: Jaksze) is a village in Kėdainiai district municipality, in Kaunas County, in central Lithuania. According to the 2011 census, the village had a population of 138 people. It is located 4 kilometres (2.5 mi) from Pernarava, by the Vikšrupis river, nearby the Pernarava-Šaravai Forest.

== History ==
An ancient stone axe has been found in Jakšiai. There was a windmill during the Interwar Period. While under Soviet control, it was a subsidiary settlement of "Salomėja Nėris" kolkhoz.

== Demography ==
Historical population

Year	Pop.	±% p.a.
1820	92	—
1902	111	+0.23%
1923	147	+1.35%
1959	136	−0.22%
1970	113	−1.67%

Year	Pop.	±% p.a.
1979	189	+5.88%
1985	202	+1.11%
1989	184	−2.31%
2001	180	−0.18%
2011	138	−2.62%

Source: 1902, 1923, 1959 & 1970, 1979, 1989, 2001, 2011

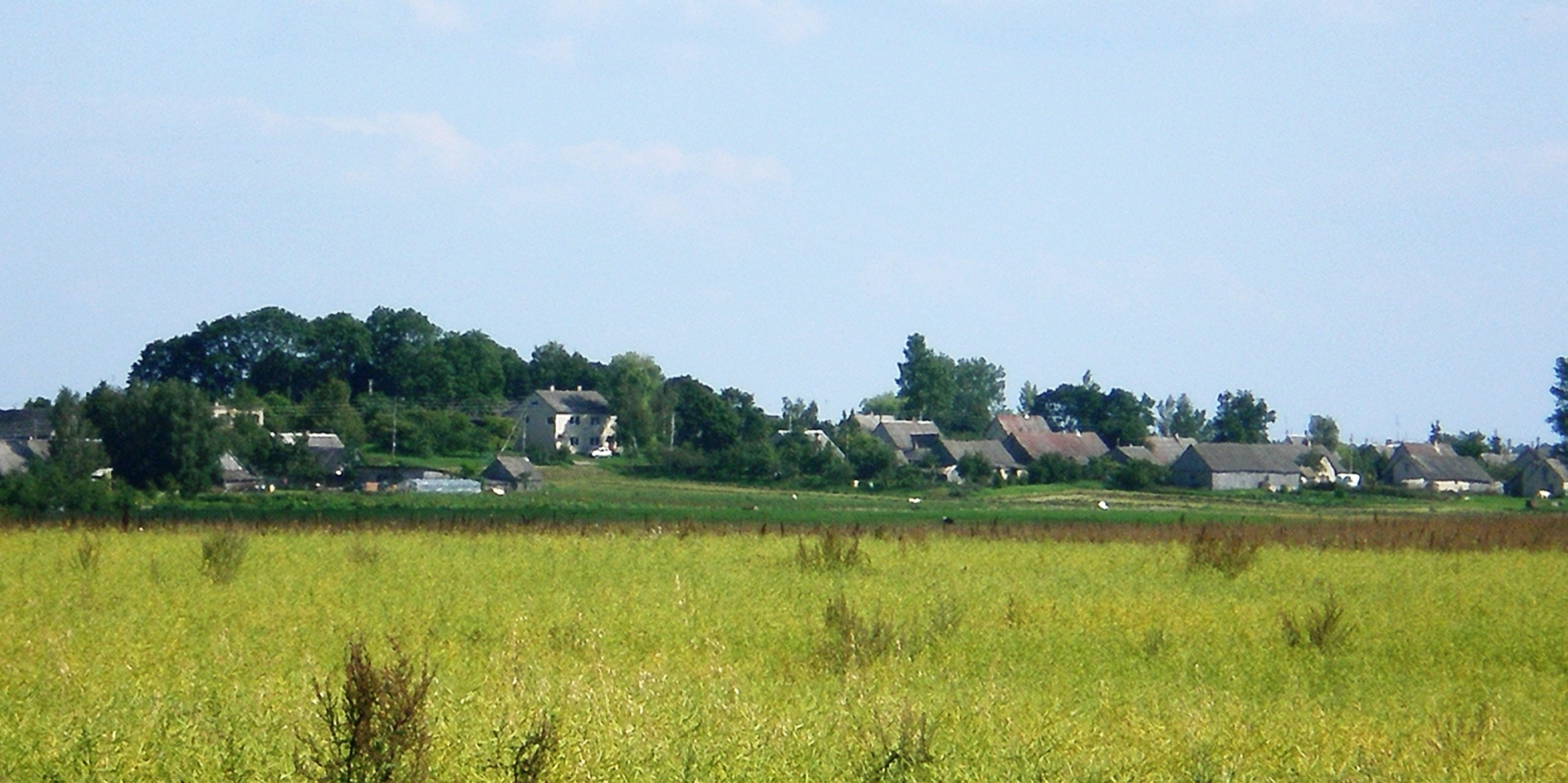
Jakšiai village on a small hill
