= Jadvyga Juškytė =

Lithuanian activist

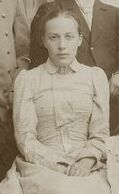
- Born: 13 January 1869; Pernarava, Russian Empire
- Died: 16 March 1948 (aged 79); Milvydai, Pernarava, Lithuanian SSR
- Other names: Širšė (pen name)
- Occupation: Schoolteacher
- Movement: Lithuanian National Revival

Jadvyga Teofilė Juškytė (1869–1948) was a Lithuanian activist during the Lithuanian National Revival.

Born to a family of petty Lithuanian nobles, Juškytė did not get any formal education but worked as a teacher most of her life. At a young age, she established an illegal Lithuanian school in Pernarava and taught there for about 15 years. She established contacts and collaborated with other Lithuanian activists. In 1893, together with Gabrielė Petkevičaitė-Bitė, she co-founded Žiburėlis, an illegal society to provide financial assistance to Lithuanian students. In 1895, she managed to get linguist Kazimieras Jaunius released from a psychiatric hospital in Kazan and bring him back to Lithuania. She prepared his notes on Lithuanian grammar into a book which was published via primitive hectograph in 1897. In 1899, she played a role in America in the Bathhouse, staged in Palanga. It was the first public Lithuanian-language theater performance in present-day Lithuania. She contributed articles to various Lithuanian periodicals, including Varpas and Tėvynės sargas, and collected examples of Lithuanian folklore, which she shared with Jonas Basanavičius and Juozas Tumas-Vaižgantas.

In 1901–1912, Juškytė worked as a private teacher. During that time, she published three Lithuanian textbooks to help children learn reading and writing. She also published a prayer book in proper and fluent Lithuanian, a small collection of Lithuanian songs and poems, and two volumes of translated theater plays. During World War I, Juškytė remained in Lithuania and established several Lithuanian schools near her native Pernarava. When Lithuania declared independence, Juškytė organized the local municipality and led a local group of Lithuanian Riflemen. In 1920–1930, she worked as a director of a primary school in Pernarava. Severe illness and partial paralysis forced her into retirement in 1930, and she died in obscurity in 1948.

== Biography ==
=== Early life ===
Juškytė was born on 13 January [O.S. 1 January] 1869 in Pernarava to a family of petty Lithuanian nobles. Her father was a relative of brothers Antanas and Jonas Juška. Both of her parents participated in the failed anti-Russian Uprising of 1863; her father was briefly jailed. Her parents rented the Pernarava Manor from the Tyszkiewicz family. Juškytė attend just one year of private school in Kėdainiai and was mainly educated at home by her mother, who was well educated and well read. The family had a personal library, as well as a gallery of portraits of their ancestors.

From an early age, Juškytė was exposed to the banned Lithuanian press. She received copies of Aušra, the first Lithuanian periodical, and even met its editor Jonas Šliūpas when he visited his uncle in Pernarava. Šliūpas remembered the young and enthusiastic Juškytė in his memoirs. Juškytė established an illegal school for the children of manor workers as well as girls from the village. She taught the Lithuanian, Polish, and Russian languages, literature, history, geography, and handicraft. She taught at this illegal school for about 15 years. The average class size was about ten students.

=== Activist ===
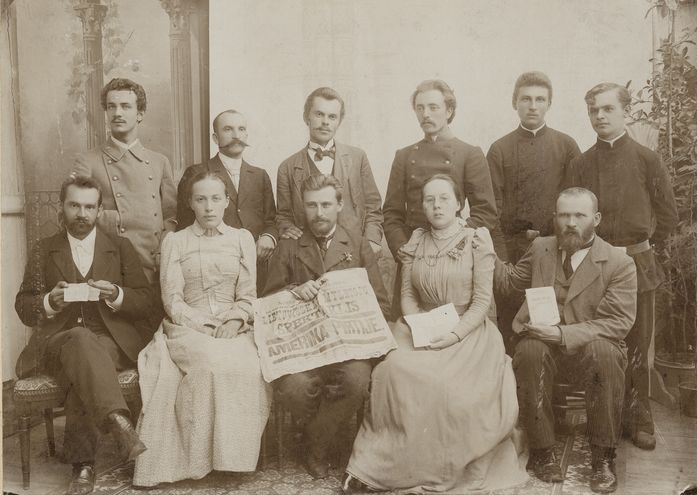
Organizers of America in the Bathhouse. Juškytė sits second from the left.

Juškytė became acquainted with Gabrielė Petkevičaitė-Bitė, another educator and activist of the Lithuanian National Revival, and in 1893, both women established Žiburėlis, an illegal society to provide financial assistance to Lithuanian students. The two women remained lifelong friends. In spring 1895, Juškytė traveled to Kazan where linguist Kazimieras Jaunius was kept in a psychiatric hospital. She managed to convince Tsarist authorities to release Jaunius and brought him back to Lithuania. She also corresponded with Jonas Basanavičius and sent him samples of Lithuanian folk tales; nine of them were later published in his collection of folk tales. She continued to collect examples of Lithuanian folklore and later sent records to the Lithuanian Scientific Society and Juozas Tumas-Vaižgantas (156 Lithuanian folk songs); many other notes remain in various archives.

Juškytė corresponded with Vincas Kudirka, the editor of Lithuanian newspaper Varpas, helping him edit and correct texts, and contributing her own short news stories to the newspaper. It is known that Juškytė wrote articles for various Lithuanian newspapers, including Tėvynės sargas, Ūkininkas, and Naujienos. After 1904, she published articles in Vilniaus žinios, Vairas, and Viltis. In her memoirs, she listed a total of 30 articles, but researchers believe there are likely more. Her contributions are difficult to identify as she frequently left them unsigned or used ambiguous initials. A more distinctive pen name was Širšė (wasp), suggested by Petkevičaitė, who used Bitė (bee). Juškytė was interested in the Lithuanian language. She obtained notes on Lithuanian grammar from her cousin, who studied Lithuanian under Kazimieras Jaunius. The notes were edited by Juškytė and Petkevičaitė-Bitė and the resulting book was published (via primitive hectograph) by a group of Lithuanian students in Dorpat (Tartu) in 1897. Her knowledge of Lithuanian was valued by linguist Jonas Jablonskis, who wanted her to help edit Vilniaus žinios in 1904.

In July 1898, Juškytė, together with her sister Marija, Petkevičaitė-Bitė, Povilas Višinskis, and Petras Avižonis, visited Kudirka. At the same time, they visited other Lithuanian activists, including teacher Petras Kriaučiūnas, doctor Jonas Staugaitis, priest Aleksandras Dambrauskas, and priest and poet Maironis. The next summer, the same core group of activists organized the first public Lithuanian-language theater performance in present-day Lithuania. They staged simple comedy America in the Bathhouse in Palanga. Juškytė played the role of Bekampienė. After the play, she approached Michał Mikołaj Ogiński and convinced him to smuggle the banned Lithuanian publications across the Russian–Prussian border. In 1899–1901, encouraged by Višinskis, Juškytė wrote a couple of short stories, but she was critical of her work and did not return to fiction writing.

=== Educator ===
In 1901, Juškytė moved to Irbit, where she taught the children of attorney Kazimieras Drąsutavičius. At the same time, she helped Drąsutavičius edit the Lithuanian–Polish–Russian botanical dictionary, which was hectographed, and compiled an anthology for Lithuanian students which was published in 1905. The anthology was designed to help students learn reading and featured texts from the realities of the village life and included samples of Lithuanian folklore (songs, folk tales, proverbs). The anthology built spatial awareness by starting with texts on immediate family, then steadily progressing to house, farm, village, forests, and the homeland. The book also included a map of the area where Lithuanian language was spoken, which was based on a map published by Petras Vileišis in 1898, and which presented a much larger Lithuanian territory than earlier maps. She planned to compile and publish three other anthologies for different reading levels, but they were not finished. In 1903, she returned to Lithuania and was employed as a tutor by Vladas Putvinskis in Pavėžupis. At the time, it was one of the centers of Lithuanian activities and a frequent meeting place of the editorial staff of Varpas. She helped edit and correct texts and otherwise supported Varpas.

After the Lithuanian press ban was lifted in 1904, Juškytė devoted her life to teaching. She was invited to teach at a new school established in the Ginkūnai Manor by Vladimir Zubov and his wife Sofija Bilevičiūtė-Zubovienė. For seven years, she taught Lithuanian language and history, geography, and arithmetic. At the same time, she also taught at the primary school in nearby Gubernija. In 1907 and 1909, she prepared and published two other books to help student learn writing. In 1906, she published 12,000 copies of a Lithuanian prayer book. Many religious texts of the time were written in improper Lithuanian and full of loanwords. Lithuanian activists wanted to publish a prayer book in proper and fluent Lithuanian. Juškytė took on the task of editing various prayers and even wrote one herself. In 1906, she also published a small collection of Lithuanian songs from an earlier publication as well as poems by Antanas Baranauskas, Antanas Strazdas, Antanas Vienažindys, Simonas Stanevičius, Dionizas Poška, Maironis, and others.

In 1905, Juškytė participated in the Great Seimas of Vilnius. In 1910, she joined and participated in the activities of the Lithuanian Scientific Society. In 1912, she published a two-volume collection of translated theater plays by Bolesław Gorczyński, Lucjan Rydel, Axel Steenbuch, and Jan Adolf Hertz.

=== In independent Lithuania ===
During World War I, Juškytė remained in Lithuania and established several Lithuanian schools near her native Pernarava. When Lithuania declared independence, Juškytė organized the local municipality, a local group of Lithuanian Riflemen (she was its leader), and donations of food and clothing for the Lithuanian Army after the Żeligowski's Mutiny. Some sources claim that for this work, she was awarded two or four Independence Medals in 1928, as well as the Order of the Lithuanian Grand Duke Gediminas, but her name does not appear in the recipient lists.

She was selected as chair of a local commission tasked with implementing the Land Reform of 1922. In retribution, Benedykt Tyszkiewicz removed her from the Pernarava Manor where her family lived since 1830. In the process, many of the family's heirlooms and valuables were lost. Nevertheless, she remained in Pernarava and from 1920 worked as a director of a primary school. In 1928, she published a book about myths and legends of Vilnius. It was a cheap and popular book with translations of texts by Władysław Zahorski. With the help of Felicija Bortkevičienė, the book was published in just two months.

In 1930, she became severely ill and the left side of her body was paralyzed, which forced her into retirement. Earning some funds from private tutoring and receiving only a small government pension (36 Lithuanian litas), she struggled financially. Nevertheless, she remained involved in Lithuanian cultural life, writing memoirs and helping others with their historical research. Juškytė never married and died in obscurity on 16 March 1948. She asked to be buried in riflemen's uniform. Because the riflemen were persecuted by the Soviet authorities, her funeral was attended by just a few people.

After Lithuania regained independence in 1990, the main street in Pernarava was renamed in her honor. In 2019, her 150th birth anniversary was commemorated in Pernarava with performances, concerts, and lectures. At the same time, a traditional wood-carved column shrine was unveiled in her memory.

== Bibliography ==
- Butkuvienė, Anelė (2007). Garsios Lietuvos moterys (in Lithuanian). Baltos lankos. ISBN 978-9955-23-065-6.
- Paškevičiūtė-Kundrotienė, Eglė (2020). "Jadvygos Juškytės (1869–1948) rankraštinis palikimas Lietuvos mokslų akademijos Vrublevskių bibliotekoje" (PDF). Lietuvos mokslų akademijos Vrublevskių biblioteka (in Lithuanian). 9.
- Petronis, Vytautas (2007). Constructing Lithuania: Ethnic Mapping in Tsarist Russia, ca. 1800-1914. Stockholm Studies in History. Vol. 91. Stockholm University. ISBN 978-91-85445-79-0.
- Rudokas, Jonas (17 April 2015). ""Žmonių geradarių eita erškėčių keliu…"" (PDF). Veidas (in Lithuanian). 15 (1154). ISSN 1392-5156.
- Švedienė, Rūta (7 June 2019). "Jadvygos Teofilės Juškytės atminimas sukosi gražiame kraštiečių renginių verpete" (in Lithuanian). Mano kraštas.
- Židžiūnienė, Aušra (9 October 2019). "Atrastas, neatrastas ir ieškomas Vaižgantas: šiandieninės klasės duris pravėrus…" (in Lithuanian). Lituanistų sambūris.
