= Petras Avižonis =

Lithuanian ophthalmologist and politician (1875–1939)

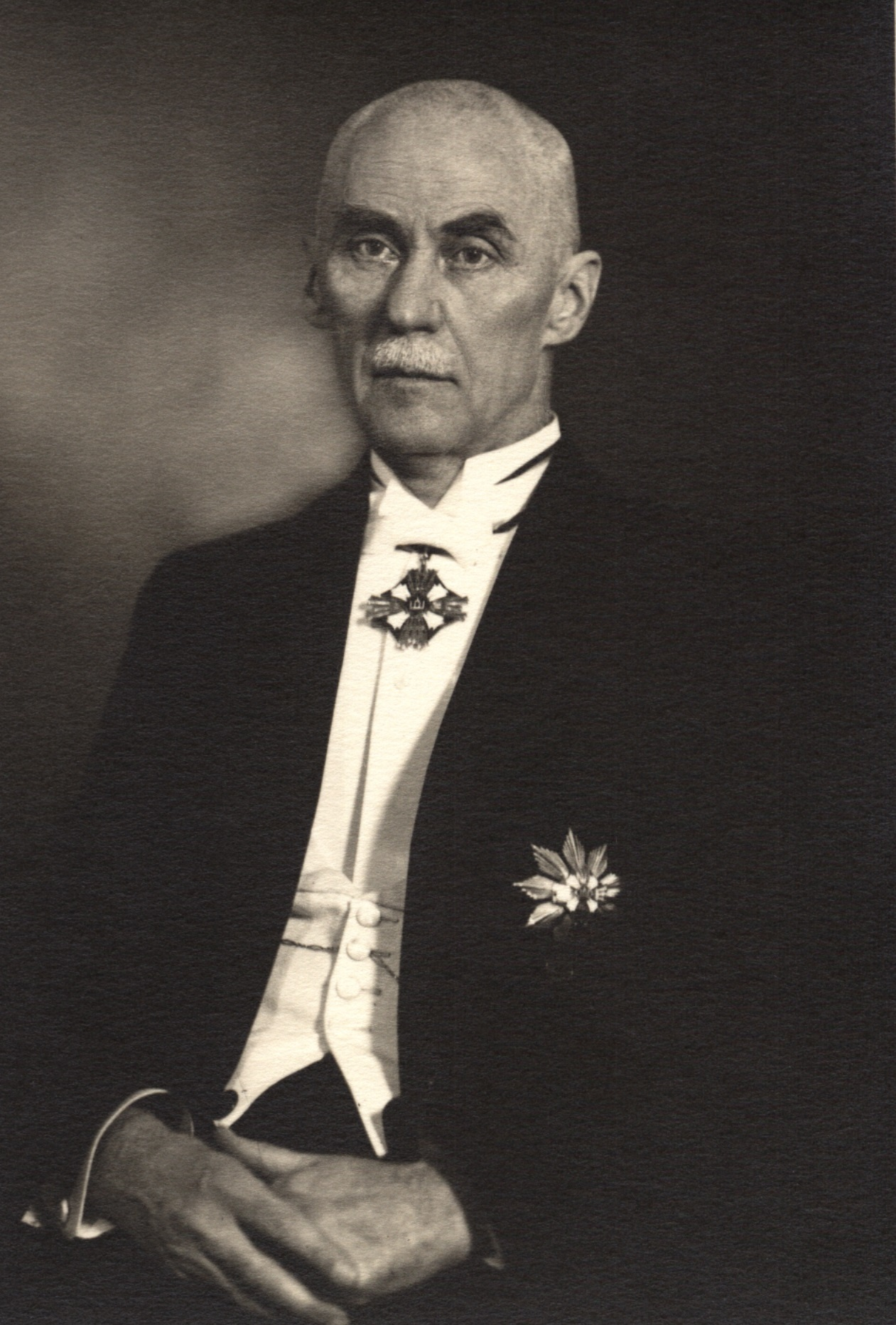
- Born: 17 April 1875; Pasvalys Kovno Governorate, Russian Empire
- Died: 17 October 1939 (aged 64); Kaunas, Lithuania
- Resting place: Petrašiūnai Cemetery
- Education: Saint Petersburg University; Dorpat University
- Occupation: Ophthalmologist
- Movement: Lithuanian National Revival
- Board member of: Society of Lithuanian Eye Doctors
- Spouse: Sofija Gruzdytė (1872–1963)
- Children: Historian Konstantinas Avižonis (1909–1969); Doctor Vytautas Avižonis (1906–2000)
- Awards: Order of the Lithuanian Grand Duke Gediminas (1932)

Petras Avižonis (17 April 1875 – 17 October 1939) was a Lithuanian ophthalmologist, rector of the University of Lithuania (1925–1926) and a political figure.

Avižonis studied biology at the Saint Petersburg University but transferred to the Dorpat University to study medicine in 1897. As a student, he was active participant in the Lithuanian National Revival, collaborating with Povilas Višinskis, Gabrielė Petkevičaitė-Bitė, Julija Žymantienė (Žemaitė). In 1897, he wrote a small Lithuanian grammar. In summer 1900, he worked with linguist Jonas Jablonskis to write a more substantial grammar, which became highly influential in creating the standard Lithuanian language. Avižonis served as an army doctor with the Imperial Russian Army in the Russo-Japanese War and World War I. He became interested in ophthalmology and completed his PhD in 1914. He particularly focused on treating and preventing trachoma. In independent Lithuania, he taught ophthalmology from 1920 to his death, organized ophthalmology section at the University of Lithuania, opened and headed a modern eye clinic, organized professional societies for doctors. Avižonis contributed to numerous Lithuanian periodicals, published separate brochures on medical and societal topics, and authored over one hundred academic articles. He attended international conferences and was elected to the board of the International Organization Against Trachoma in 1938. His main work, the 844-page guide to eye diseases, was unsurpassed for over fifty years.

== Biography ==
=== Early life and education ===
Avižonis was born on 17 April [O.S. 5 April] 1875 in Pasvalys. His family owned about 16 hectares (40 acres) of land and had eight children (three sons and five daughters). His parents, active book smugglers who helped Jurgis Bielinis hide the books, wanted him to become a priest and sent him to a private four-year German school in Mitau (present-day Jelgava) in 1884. After the graduation, he refused to attend a priest seminary and instead continued his education at the Mitau Gymnasium which was attended by many other Lithuanian students, later prominent figures in Lithuanian politics and culture. These students organized an illegal student organization, which Avižonis reorganized into the Infant Society in 1890. The society promoted the Lithuanian national consciousness and helped distribute banned Lithuanian books. Upon graduation in 1894, Avižonis worked as a tutor for a year to save up money for university studies. He also received financial aid from Žiburėlis society. He chose biology at the Saint Petersburg University. Due to strict Russification policies, as a Lithuanian and non-Eastern Orthodox, Avižonis could only work in Lithuania if he became a priest, a doctor, or an attorney. Therefore, he transferred to the Dorpat University to study medicine in 1897 and graduated in 1900.

In Saint Petersburg, he became active among Lithuanian students, began contributing to Lithuanian periodicals Varpas and Ūkininkas, and helped Povilas Višinskis edit the first works of writer Julija Žymantienė (Žemaitė). In 1898, he published his first booklet, a popular explanation of some basic topics in earth science. In June 1898, Avižonis, Višinkis, Gabrielė Petkevičaitė-Bitė, Jadvyga Juškytė and her sister Marija visited Vincas Kudirka, the publisher of Varpas living in Naumiestis in Suvalkija. They also visited Tadeusz Dowgird, archaeologist and artist, Petras Kriaučiūnas, teacher and book smuggler, and Kazimieras Jaunius, priest and linguist. In August 1899, Avižonis helped organizing the first Lithuanian-language theater performance, comedy America in the Bathhouse (Amerika pirtyje), in Palanga. After the performance, Liudas Vaineikis took Višinskis and Avižonis to Tilsit in East Prussia, the major publishing center of the illegal Lithuanian press. On their way back, they visited Juozas Tumas-Vaižgantas in Kuliai and Sofija Pšibiliauskienė near Tryškiai.

He continued to correspond with linguist Jonas Jablonskis, former teacher at Mitau, and with his encouragement wrote a small Lithuanian grammar based on the German-language writings of Friedrich Kurschat and on works by Kazimieras Jaunius. It was the first work that used the Lithuanian alphabet as it is used today. When the book could not be printed, Antanas Smetona and Vladas Sirutavičius made about 100 copies using a mimeograph in 1898. This grammar was insufficient for Lithuanian needs and in summer 1900 Jablonskis and Avižonis wrote a more substantial grammar, which became highly influential in creating the standard Lithuanian language. It was published in 1901 under the pen name Petras Kriaušaitis (Petras is Avižonis' first name and Kriaušaitis is Jablonskis' pen name).

=== In Russian Empire ===
Upon graduation, he worked as a doctor in Ariogala. At the time, he did not specialize and treated all kinds of ailments. In 1901, he married Sofija Gruzdytė, who studied midwifery and massage in Dorpat, contributed to Lithuanian press, and published a translation of Tolstoy's The Restoration of Hell in 1908. She was sister-in-law of Vladas Putvinskis. In October 1902, he participated in a meeting of Varpas publishers and contributors in Dabikinė Manor. The meeting was organized by Povilas Višinskis and attended by Jonas Biliūnas, Kazys Grinius, Jurgis Šaulys, Jonas Vileišis, Antanas Smetona, and others. They discussed political ideas and established the Lithuanian Democratic Party. In 1903, the couple moved to Žagarė where he organized a cooperative, a charitable society, and a shelter for the poor. In 1904, Avižonis assisted Jonas Jablonskis in preparing for publication the second volume of the Polish–Lithuanian dictionary, compiled by Antanas Juška. During the Russo-Japanese War, he was drafted to serve as doctor in the Imperial Russian Army and was taken captive by the Japanese. In 1910, he moved to Šiauliai.

Avižonis became interested in ophthalmology after taking part in an expedition of Russian ophthalmologists to Zarasai. He continued his medical education specializing in ophthalmology by attending courses on anthropometry by Fedir Vovk, taking classes at the Imperial Clinical Institute of Grand Duchess Elena Pavlovna, and practicing at the eye clinics of professors Vladimir Dolganov and Alexander Lutkevich. He defended his PhD thesis on eye ailments in Gruzdžiai and Lygumai area at the Dorpat University in 1914. His thesis concluded that blindness in some 60% of cases resulted from trachoma and dedicated his efforts in eradicating the infectious disease.

At the same time, Avižonis continued to be active in Lithuanian cultural life. During the Russian Revolution of 1905, his political views shifted towards social democracy. Using more than 50 pen names, he contributed numerous articles, often on medical topics, to Lithuanian press, including democratic Vilniaus žinios (1905–1909), Lietuvos ūkininkas (1905–1909), Lietuvos žinios, and social democratic Darbininkų balsas (1902), Naujoji Gadynė (1906), Skardas (1907), and others. He also published several booklets: Socialists and Masons (1906), Alcoholism Our Curse (1907), Workers and Society (1908), Earth and Human (1910). Some of the medical articles, published in Sveikata supplement of Lietuvos ūkininkas, were republished as separate brochures. He was a member of the Lithuanian Scientific Society and contributed to its journal Lietuvių tauta. He participated in the cultural Varpas Society in Šiauliai. The society organized music and theater performances, lectures, Lithuanian evenings, etc.

At the outbreak of World War I, Avižonis was again drafted to serve as doctor in the Imperial Russian Army. From December 1914 to June 1916, he worked as a senior doctor in a Red Cross sanitary train and a medical platoon. He then became director of the ophthalmology section of the Central Prison Hospital attached to the Butyrka prison and doctor at the Red Cross Hospital in Moscow. After the February Revolution in 1917, he joined the Russian Social Democratic Labour Party (Bolsheviks). He attended the Lithuanian Petrograd Seimas in June 1917.

=== In independent Lithuania ===
In June 1918, Avižonis returned to Lithuania taking up residence in Šiauliai. As a member of the Lithuanian Communist Party, he was invited by Vincas Mickevičius-Kapsukas to become Commissar of Health in the short-lived Lithuanian–Byelorussian Soviet Socialist Republic in 1919. Kapsukas also delegated Avižonis to purchase textbooks for the planned university in Vilnius. This episode almost led to his arrest in 1920 when he was accused of being a Bolshevik collaborator.

In independent Lithuania, Avižonis focused his efforts on medicine and departed from politics. He moved to Kaunas and organized the Medical Society of Kaunas in May 1919. This and other local medical societies organized the Union of Lithuanian Doctors in 1923. Its statute was drafted by Avižonis. From 1920, Avižonis lectured at the Higher Courses, the predecessor of the University of Lithuania established in 1922. At the new university, he was the dean of the Faculty of Medicine (1923–1924), university prorector (1924–1925), and rector (1925–1926). He continued to teach ophthalmology and history of medicine until his death in 1939. In 1930, he established an eye clinic and organized the construction of a modern building. It was a 50-bed hospital that in 1930–1938 treated almost 5,000 inpatients and 217,000 outpatients. The clinic was merged with the Red Cross Hospital in September 1939, just a month prior to his death.

Avižonis was a member of the German (from 1923) and French (from 1930) Societies of Ophthalmology. He attended international conferences and was elected to the board of the International Organization Against Trachoma in 1938. In 1932, he founded the Society of Lithuanian Eye Doctors and chaired it until 1939. He published 134 academic articles on diagnosis, treatment, and prevention of various eye diseases in Lithuanian (95 articles in Medicina), Latvian, German, French, contributed articles to the Lithuanian Encyclopedia, edited medical journals Medicina (Lithuanian), Archiv Oftalmologii (Russian), Ophthalmologica (German). His main work – the 844-page guide to eye diseases – was published posthumously in 1940. It remained the only comprehensive Lithuanian-language guide to eye diseases for over half a century. When writing in Lithuanian, Avižonis had to translate or create numerous medical terms – about 250 in total, including some fundamental terms like tinklainė (retina), akiduobė (orbit), lęšiukas (lens). He was interested in linguistics and assisted Kazimieras Būga and Juozas Balčikonis in their efforts of compiling the Academic Dictionary of Lithuanian.

Avižonis died on 17 October 1939. His funeral was a large public event, attended by many dignitaries. His body was cremated and his ashes stored in a copper urn made by Petras Rimša. Due to World War II, the urn remained unburied until November 1984. The ashes were buried with a public ceremony in the Petrašiūnai Cemetery.
