= Žiburėlis =

Lithuanian educational organization

Žiburėlis (diminutive of žiburys meaning 'light', 'beacon'), later Lietuvos žiburėlis, was a charitable society providing financial aid to gifted Lithuanian students. The society grew out of the Lithuanian National Revival, hopes of creating Lithuanian intelligentsia, and frustration over financial hardships faced by many young students. It was established in 1893 by Gabrielė Petkevičaitė-Bitė and Jadvyga Juškytė, and led by Felicija Bortkevičienė from 1903 until its dissolution in 1940.

== History ==
It was established in 1893 by Gabrielė Petkevičaitė-Bitė and Jadvyga Juškytė with help from Vincas Kudirka and Jonas Jablonskis. The meeting took place in Jablonskis' home in Mitau (Jelgava); at the time, he worked as a teacher at Jelgava Gymnasium. At the time, it was an illegal organization as all Lithuanian organizations were banned after the Uprising of 1863. Petkevičaitė-Bitė was the driving force of the society; she was helped by many other wealthier women, but their involvement was usually short-lived. The funds were raised by various means, including donations from the public and Lithuanian Americans, card games among intellectuals, and other events. For example, the first public Lithuanian theater performance, Amerika pirtyje, in 1899 donated some of the proceeds to Žiburėlis. In 1904, Povilas Višinskis suggested publishing and selling postcards. Up to 1900, the society distributed 3,258 rubles (1,629 U.S. dollars). By 1906, the amount grew to almost 8,000 rubles.

In 1903, Felicija Bortkevičienė took over the society and headed it until its dissolution in 1940. The death of Višinskis from tuberculosis that he had contracted as a student at the Saint Petersburg University became an impulse to legalize and expand the society. The society legalized its activities and became an officially registered organization on 14 January 1907. After Lithuania became independent, Žiburėlis grew and strengthened. It collected funds from membership fees, donations, and proceeds from various events, including lotteries and concerts. After graduation, former aid recipients repaid their support. In 1921, it established a 30-room dormitory in Kaunas. The society had sections in other cities, including Šiauliai, Ukmergė, and Panevėžys. The society ceased to exist when Lithuania was occupied by the Soviet Union in 1940.

== Supported students ==
During its existence, the society supported some 300 gifted students many of whom who later became prominent figures in Lithuania, including forester Povilas Matulionis, writer Jonas Biliūnas, painter and composer Mikalojus Konstantinas Čiurlionis, jurist Rapolas Skipitis, diplomat Jurgis Šaulys, doctor Petras Avižonis, linguist Kazimieras Būga, operatic tenor Kipras Petrauskas, painter Adomas Varnas, sculptors Petras Rimša and Juozas Zikaras, priest Antanas Viskantas, Prime Minister Ernestas Galvanauskas, Soviet revolutionary Vincas Mickevičius-Kapsukas, and poet Julius Janonis.
