= Milvydai =

Milvydai (from the Lithuanian personal name Milvydas) could refer to several Lithuanian villages:

- Milvydai, Krakės, in Krakės Eldership of Kėdainiai District Municipality
- Milvydai, Pernarava, in Pernarava Eldership of Kėdainiai District Municipality
- Milvydai, Šalčininkai, in Šalčininkai District Municipality
- Milvydai, Šiauliai, in Šiauliai District Municipality.
