= Gižiemiai =

- Village
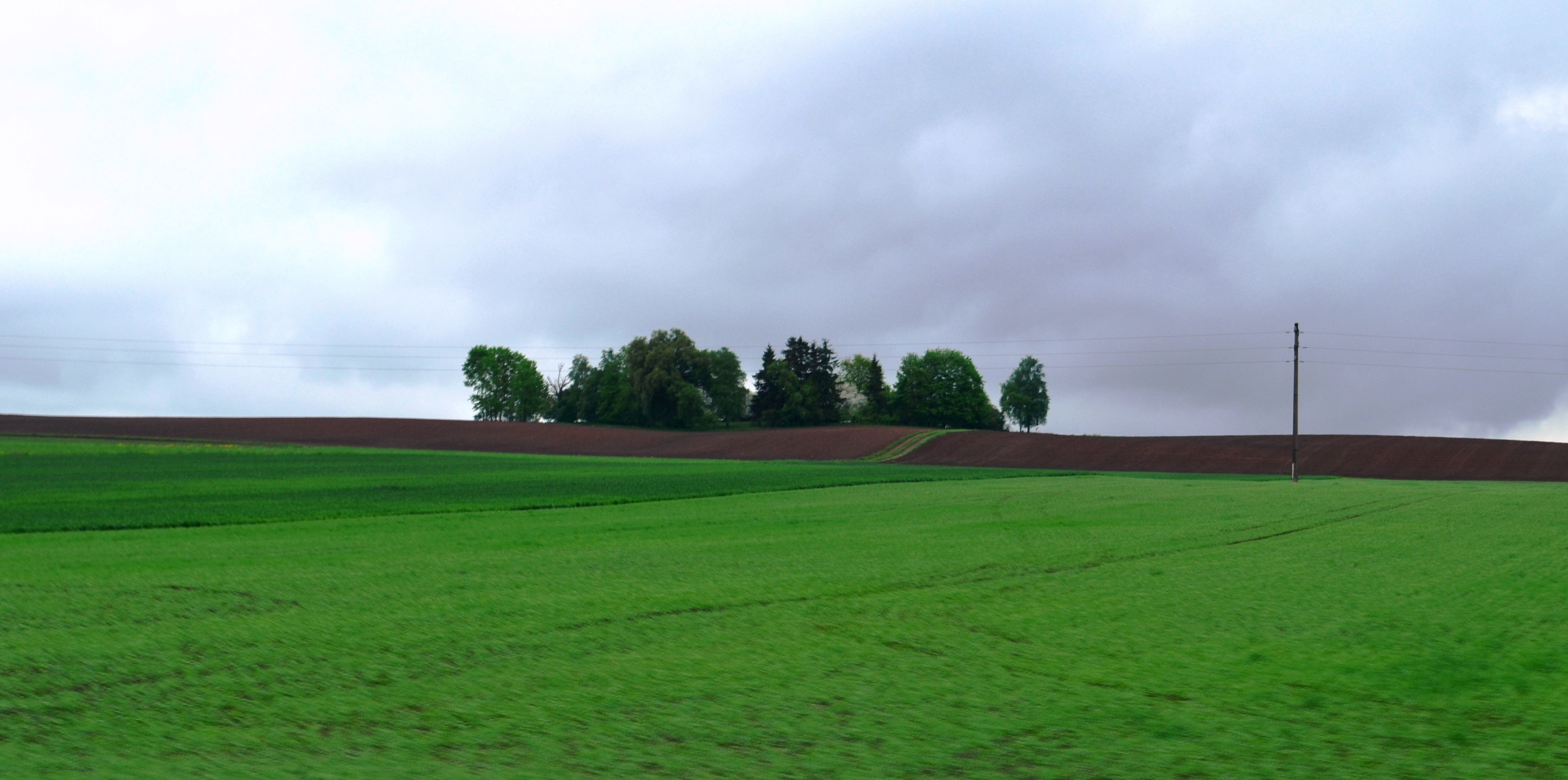

- Location in Lithuania Gižiemiai (Lithuania)
- Coordinates: 55°15′29″N 23°36′00″E
- Country: Lithuania
- County: Kaunas County
- Municipality: Kėdainiai district municipality
- Eldership: Pernarava Eldership

Population (2011)
  - Total: 0
- Time zone: UTC+2 (EET)
  - Summer (DST): UTC+3 (EEST)

Gižiemiai (formerly Russian: Гижемы, Polish: Giżemy) is a village in Kėdainiai district municipality, in Kaunas County, in central Lithuania. According to the 2011 census, the village was uninhabited. It is located 2 kilometres (1.2 mi) from Pernarava, by the Josvainiai-Ariogala road.

Giežiemiai village and folwark has been mentioned at the end of the 19the century. It was an okolica (a property of the Dautartai family) at the beginning of the 20th century.

== Demography ==
Historical population

| Year | Pop. | ±% p.a. |
|---|---|---|
| 1923 | 37 | — |
| 1959 | 43 | +0.42% |
| 1970 | 11 | −11.66% |
| 1979 | 3 | −13.44% |

| Year | Pop. | ±% p.a. |
|---|---|---|
| 1989 | 2 | −3.97% |
| 2001 | 0 | −100.00% |
| 2011 | 0 | 0.00% |

Source: 1902, 1923, 1959 & 1970, 1979, 1989, 2001, 2011
