= Jankūnai, Pernarava =

Village in Lithuania

Jankūnai
- Village
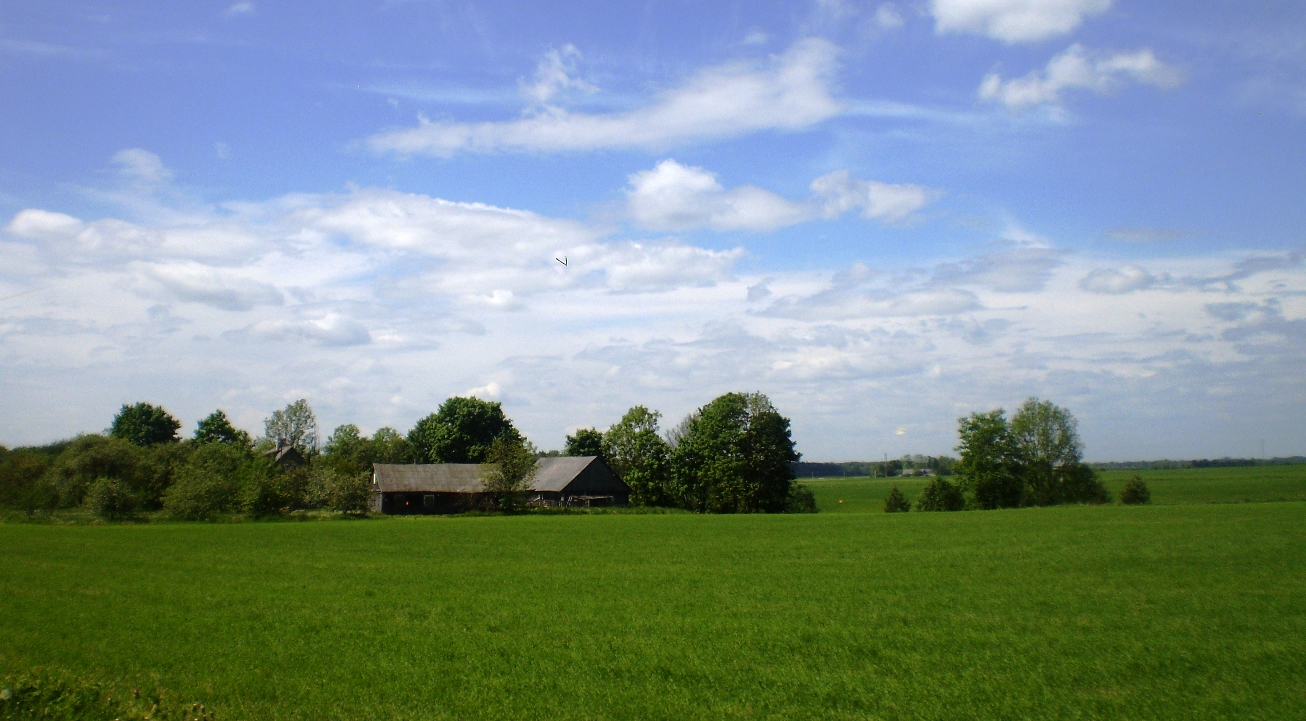

- Location in Lithuania Jankūnai (Lithuania)
- Coordinates: 55°16′41″N 23°38′49″E
- Country: Lithuania
- County: Kaunas County
- Municipality: Kėdainiai district municipality
- Eldership: Pernarava Eldership

Population (2011)
  - Total: 12
- Time zone: UTC+2 (EET)
  - Summer (DST): UTC+3 (EEST)

Jankūnai (formerly Russian: Янкуны, Polish: Jankuny) is a village in Kėdainiai district municipality, in Kaunas County, in central Lithuania. According to the 2011 census, the village had a population of 12 people. It is located 1 kilometre (0.62 mi) from Pernarava, by a crossroad (roads to Ariogala, Josvainiai, Pernarava, Pašušvys).

== History ==
At the beginning of the 20th it was an okolica in Ariogala volost.

== Demography ==
Historical population

Year	Pop.	±% p.a.
1902	120	—
1923	112	−0.33%
1959	110	−0.05%
1970	56	−5.95%

Year	Pop.	±% p.a.
1979	28	−7.41%
1989	16	−5.44%
2001	16	+0.00%
2011	12	−2.84%

Source: 1902, 1923, 1959 & 1970, 1979, 1989, 2001, 2011

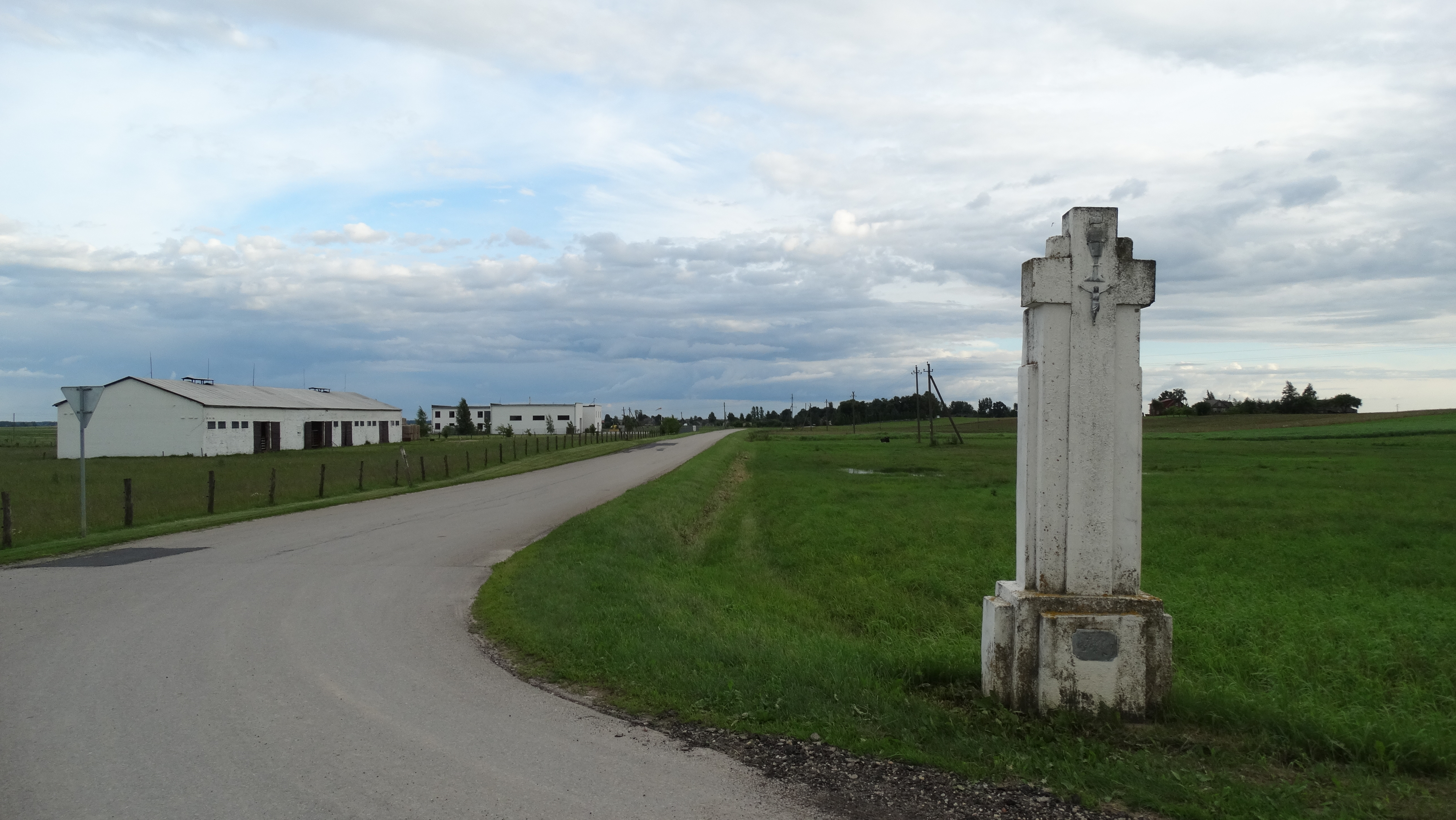
A cross by the crossroad
