= Petras Kriaučiūnas =

Lithuanian teacher, judge, attorney and activist

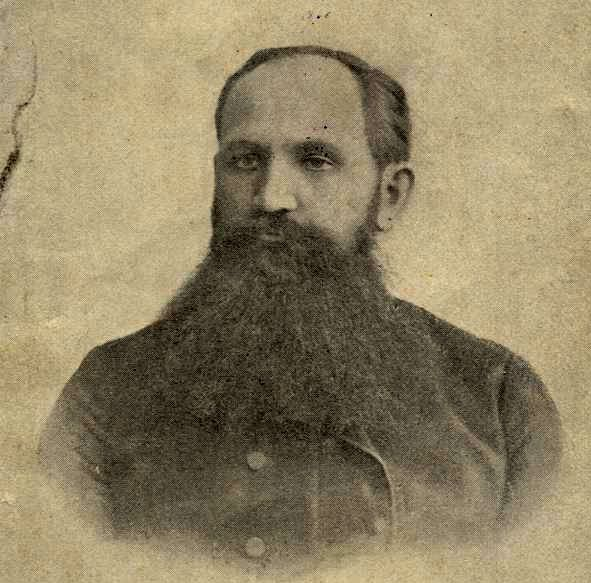
- Born: 16 September 1850; Girėnai, Suwałki Governorate, Congress Poland
- Died: 20 January 1916 (aged 65); Yaroslavl, Russian Empire
- Education: Sejny Priest Seminary; Saint Petersburg Roman Catholic Theological Academy; University of Warsaw
- Occupations: Teacher, judge, attorney
- Employer: Marijampolė Gymnasium
- Movement: Lithuanian National Revival
- Spouse: Sofija Zalevskaitė (1849–1912)

Petras Kriaučiūnas (1850–1916) was an activist during the Lithuanian National Revival. Educated as a priest, he taught at the Marijampolė Gymnasium in 1881–1887 and 1906–1914 and was active as an amateur linguist.

Kriaučiūnas was born into a well-off Lithuanian family in Suvalkija. He attended Marijampolė Gymnasium and Sejny Priest Seminary. As a good student, he obtained a stipend from the Archbishop of Mogilev to study at the Saint Petersburg Roman Catholic Theological Academy. However, the stipend obligated him to work at the Archdiocese of Mogilev. Therefore, he declined the final ordination to priesthood and attended University of Warsaw for a year to get a teaching diploma. He then returned to Lithuania and became a teacher at the Marijampolė Gymnasium. He taught Latin, Lithuanian, German and Greek languages and encouraged his students, many of whom later became prominent figures in independent Lithuania, to be proud of their Lithuanian identity and heritage. He defied the Lithuanian press ban teaching his students Lithuanian in the Latin alphabet and not the government-imposed Cyrillic script. Kriaučiūnas actively supported Aušra and Varpas, the key Lithuanian-language periodicals.

He was forced to resign from the gymnasium in 1887 and found employment with the Marijampolė Court. In 1889, he was assigned as justice of the peace to Plokščiai where he spent a decade. During his free time, he continued to study linguistics. While his contemporaries were impressed by his wealth of knowledge, he wrote very little. His home was frequently visited by various activists and scholars. He was particularly close with Vincas Kudirka. In 1899, he lost his government job and was forced to take up a private attorney practice in Marijampolė until he was able to regain his teaching position at the Marijampolė Gymnasium in 1906. He taught Latin and Lithuanian languages and law. During World War I, the gymnasium evacuated to Yaroslavl where he died in January 1916.

== Biography ==
=== Early life and education ===
Kriaučiūnas was born on 16 September [O.S. 4 September] 1850 to a well-off family of Lithuanian farmers in Girėnai located near the Russia–Prussia border between Vištytis and Kybartai. He was the eldest of eight children. His father was an educated man who acted as a local lay judge. The family owned about 150 morgens of land. As many parents of the time, Kriaučiūnas' family wanted him to become a Catholic priest and sent him to get education. He first studied at a primary school in Vištytis and in 1864 enrolled into a four-year school in Marijampolė. In the aftermath of the Uprising of 1863, the school was undergoing reorganization – it was transformed into a seven-year gymnasium and teaching language switched from Polish to Russian in 1866–1867. Despite widespread Polonization and Russification, Kriaučiūnas was proud of his Lithuanian identity and heritage. He started comparing Lithuanian words with Latin and Greek words exploring their Indo-European roots (he got up to the letter P). When one teacher mocked the Lithuanian language, he translated the poem Czego chcesz od nas, Panie by Jan Kochanowski and the fable The Old Man and Death by Ivan Krylov into Lithuanian and read them during a graduation ceremony.

After graduating from the gymnasium, Kriaučiūnas became a cleric at the Sejny Priest Seminary in 1871. He was a good student and worked as an assistant librarian keeping up with the newest books and periodicals. He wanted to continue his studies at the Saint Petersburg Roman Catholic Theological Academy, but the seminary would not grant him a stipend. He then managed to get a stipend from the Archbishop of Mogilev and started his studies at the academy in 1876. In Saint Petersburg, he met Silvestras Gimžauskas and Kazimieras Jaunius who were also active in the Lithuanian National Revival. At the time, several noted linguists and philologists, including Lucian Müller, Franz Anton Schiefner, Daniel Chwolson, and Nikolai Petrovich Nekrasov, taught at the academy. In 1880, Kriaučiūnas completed his exams and received a candidate degree in theology, but as a stipend recipient he would have been obligated to work in the Archdiocese of Mogilev. Therefore, Kriaučiūnas did not accept the final ordination to priesthood and returned to Lithuania. He then studied at the University of Warsaw for a year and received a Latin teacher's diploma.

=== During the Lithuanian press ban ===
In November 1881, Kriaučiūnas became a teacher at the Marijampolė Gymnasium. He taught Latin, Lithuanian, German and Greek languages. He was a dedicated teacher using new teaching methods (e.g. rhymes to help memorize grammar rules). He defied the Lithuanian press ban and in Lithuanian lessons used illegal Lithuanian books in the Latin alphabet instead of the legal publications in the government-imposed Cyrillic script. He encouraged his students to translate texts into Lithuanian, collect samples of Lithuanian folklore, learn and study Lithuanian history and culture. His students included future President of Lithuania Kazys Grinius who counted some 80 students of Kriaučiūnas who later became prominent figures in Lithuanian culture, science, politics, including 30 who became members of the Seimas, government ministers, and university professors. While his lessons inspired patriotic feelings, they lacked structure and consistency. He taught Lithuanian grammar that was based on an eclectic mix of previous works by August Schleicher, Friedrich Kurschat, Antanas Baranauskas, Kazimieras Jaunius. His apartment at the Warsaw Hotel was frequently visited by students, various activists, Lithuanian book smugglers. Kriaučiūnas became a strong supporter of Aušra, the first Lithuanian-language periodical aimed at Lithuanians in the Russian Empire – he edited articles, donated funds, distributed physical copies. He later also supported Varpas – the first meeting of Varpas collaborators took place at his apartment in June 1888.

The Tsarist authorities noticed Lithuanian activities and one by one Lithuanian personnel were forced out of the gymnasium. Kriaučiūnas' workload was reduced to 10 lessons and his salary was cut to 250 rubles a year. He resigned on 1 September 1887. He found employment as a secretary of the Marijampolė Court with a monthly salary of 25 rubles which he shared with Jonas Jablonskis who briefly worked at the court before his appointment to the Mitau Gymnasium. In January 1889, he was transferred as a judge of the peace to Plokščiai where he spent a decade. A position somewhere in the interior of Russia would have been more prestigious and lucrative, but Kriaučiūnas wanted to remain in his native Suvalkija. In May 1889, he married Sofija Zalevskaitė, a widow of the teacher and writer Petras Arminas-Trupinėlis. Kriaučiūnas collected and published Arminas' works in 1893 (republished in 1907). Kriaučiūnas was disliked by Tsarist officials and local landowners and was dismissed from his court job in 1899 and returned to Marijampolė where he started a private attorney practice.

During this time, he devoted his free time to philological studies and developed a scholarly reputation. He delivered two lectures to philological societies in Saint Petersburg in 1897 and 1900 and was a member of the Lithuanian Literary Society. His home was frequently visited by various activists and researchers, including foreigners Jan Niecisław Baudouin de Courtenay, J. J. Mikkola and his wife Maila Talvio, Aukusti Niemi, Eduards Volters, Alexander Alexandrov, Åge Meyer Benedictsen. His Lithuanian visitors included Antanas Baranauskas, Jonas Jablonskis, Petras Avižonis, Juozas Tumas-Vaižgantas, Gabrielė Petkevičaitė-Bitė, Povilas Višinskis. Kriaučiūnas was particularly close with Vincas Kudirka. Kriaučiūnas submitted numerous petitions arguing in favor of lifting the Lithuanian press ban. He knew eight languages (Lithuanian, Polish, Russian, Latin, Greek, Latvian, German, and French) and had a rich philological library. However, he wrote very little and left no extensive bibliography. He collected examples of Lithuanian folklore (about 160 songs collected by him are known), contributed material to the dictionary of Antanas Juška, translated ten poems from various languages (works by Gavrila Derzhavin, Victor Hugo, Mikhail Lermontov, Friedrich Schiller, Alexander Pushkin, Maria Konopnicka), and wrote a couple papers and articles on language matters. There are hints that he was working on a Russian–Polish–Lithuanian dictionary – no manuscript is known though he was well known to collect words. Even as a judge, he would interrupt court proceedings to take notes on a rarer or more interesting word. Kriaučiūnas had a manuscript of a Lithuanian–Polish dictionary with about 21,000 words from 1820 that we was annotating and correcting.

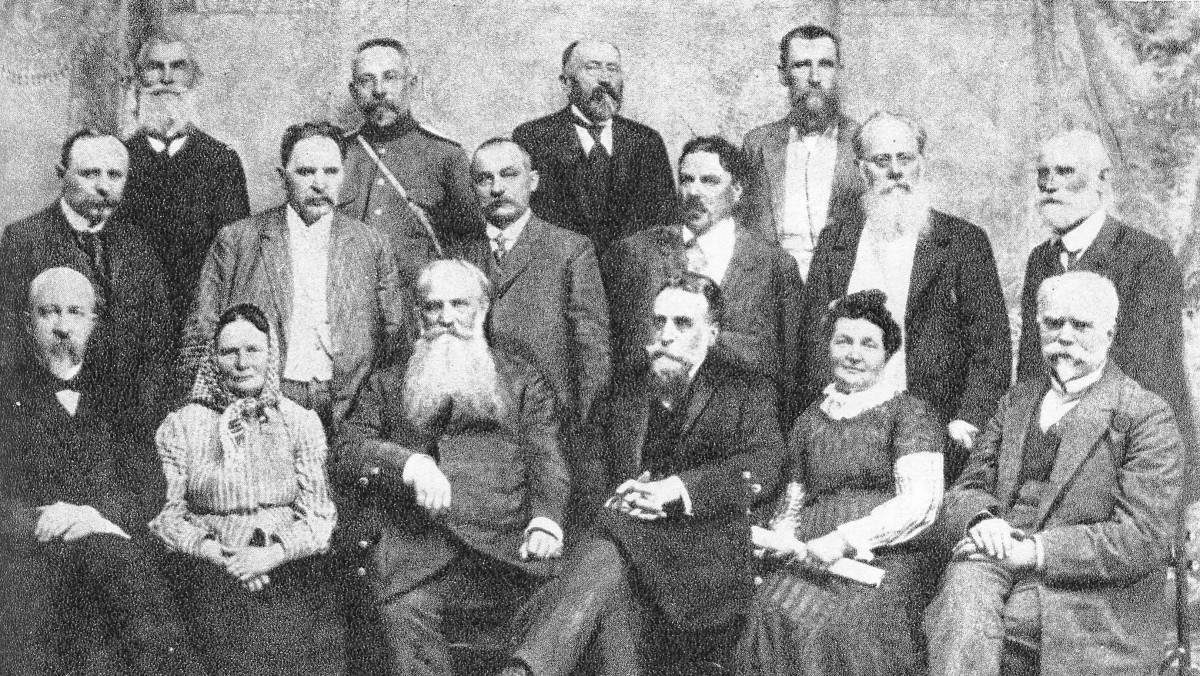
Members of the Lithuanian Science Society in 1912. Kriaučiūnas sits third from left between Žemaitė and Jonas Basanavičius

=== After the Russian Revolution of 1905 ===
The Lithuanian press ban was lifted in 1904 and the Russian Revolution of 1905 brought some relaxation of the various Russification policies. Kriaučiūnas was able to regain his teaching position at the Marijampolė Gymnasium in September 1906. He taught Latin and Lithuanian languages and law. As a school librarian, he established a section of Lithuanian publications in the library. At the same time, he also taught at the girls' progymnasium established by the Žiburys Society and the girls' gymnasium established by Ksenija Breverniūtė. In 1909, he published a slim 18-page textbook on Latin syntax in Russian. In 1913–1914, he prepared a program for teaching Lithuanian language in schools and sent it to the Ministry of National Education for approval. In 1909, he joined the newly established Lithuanian Scientific Society and worked on the failed attempt to establish its chapter in Marijampolė.

At the outbreak of World War I, Kriaučiūnas retreated to Vilnius where he lived at the premises of the Lithuanian Scientific Society. In August 1915, together with the Marijampolė Gymnasium, he evacuated to Yaroslavl where he fell ill in late 1915 and died on 20 January 1916. He was buried in the old cemetery of Yaroslavl. His grave was destroyed when the cemetery was liquidated. A primary school and a public library in Marijampolė were named after Kriaučiūnas in 1935 and 1937. A middle school in Vištytis was named after Kriaučiūnas in 1999.
