= Avižonis =

- Lithuanian surname
- m.: Avižonis
- f.: (unmarried): Avižonytė
- f.: (married): Avižonienė

Avižonis is a Lithuanian surname. Notable people with the surname include:

- Konstantinas Avižonis (1909–1969), Lithuanian historian
- Petras Avižonis (1875–1939), Lithuanian ophthalmologist and politician
