= Milvydai, Pernarava =

Milvydai
- Village
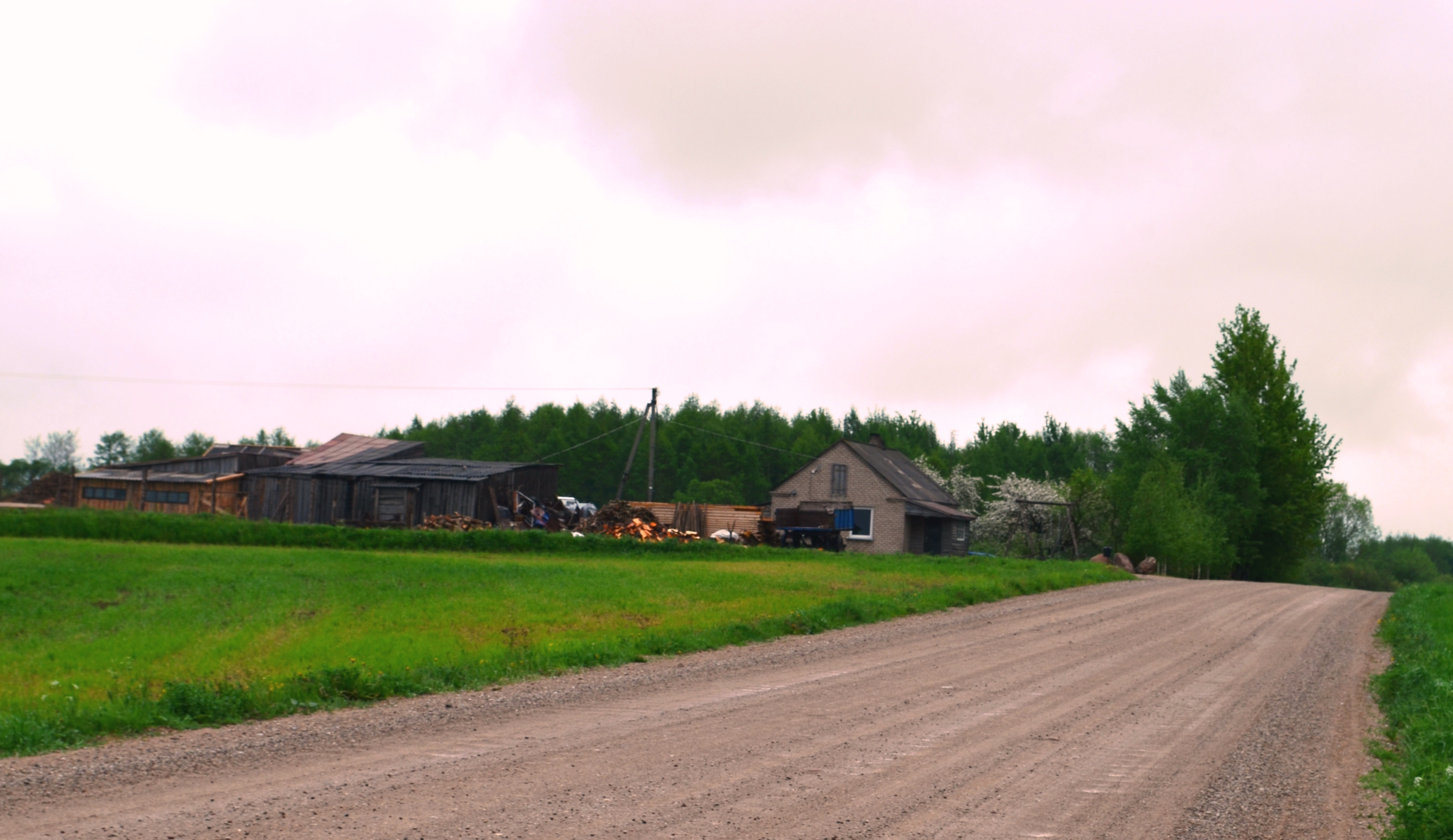

- Location in Lithuania Milvydai (Lithuania)
- Coordinates: 55°16′26″N 23°37′01″E
- Country: Lithuania
- County: Kaunas County
- Municipality: Kėdainiai district municipality
- Eldership: Pernarava Eldership

Population (2011)
  - Total: 6
- Time zone: UTC+2 (EET)
  - Summer (DST): UTC+3 (EEST)

Milvydai (formerly Russian: Мильвиды, Polish: Milwidy) is a village in Kėdainiai district municipality, in Kaunas County, in central Lithuania. According to the 2011 census, the village had a population of 6 people. It is located 2 kilometres (1.2 mi) from Pernarava, between the Bernaupis rivulet and the Josvainiai-Ariogala road.

There was an okolica of Milvydai (a property of the Ivaškevičiai) at the beginning of the 20th century.

== Demography ==
Historical population

Year	Pop.	±% p.a.
1902	66	—
1923	69	+0.21%
1959	55	−0.63%
1970	17	−10.12%

Year	Pop.	±% p.a.
1979	16	−0.67%
1989	5	−10.98%
2001	10	+5.95%
2011	6	−4.98%

Source: 1902, 1923, 1959 & 1970, 1979, 1989, 2001, 2011
