= Stasė Vaineikienė =

Lithuanian writer and activist

- Born: Stasė Paulauskaitė; 31 March 1884; Šlaveitai, Russian Empire
- Died: 12 January 1946 (aged 61); Vilnius, Lithuanian SSR
- Burial place: Rasos Cemetery
- Occupations: Writer, activist
- Spouse: Liudas Vaineikis

Stasė Vaineikienė née Paulauskaitė (31 March 1884 – 12 January 1946) was a Lithuanian writer and activist.

Born to a family of petty Lithuanian nobles, Vaineikienė married physician and activist Liudas Vaineikis. Together, they organized the smuggling of banned Lithuanian publications for which Vaineikis was sentenced to internal exile. During the Russian Revolution of 1905, she helped smuggling social democratic press. During World War I, she lived in Central Asia. Upon her return to Lithuania, she settled in Palanga and became active in city's life. She worked on reestablishing the Palanga Gymnasium and improving the city's sanitation. She was elected to the first city council in 1932. After the Soviet occupation of Lithuania in June 1940, she became mayor of Palanga, was elected to the People's Seimas, and became a member of the Supreme Court of the Lithuanian SSR.

She wrote three historical novels. Two novels about serfdom in Lithuania were published in 1937–1938 and republished in 1958–1959. The third novel has been lost. She also wrote three memoirs: about the life of Palanga (published in 1931), struggles in the Russian Empire (three volumes published in 1935–1936), and World War I and Russian Civil War in Central Asia (published in 2014; Russian and Uzbek translations in 2022).

== Biography ==
=== Russian Empire ===
Vaineikienė was born on 31 March 1884 in Šlaveitai in the present-day Kretinga District Municipality in a family of petty Lithuanian nobles. Her mother owned about 200 hectares (490 acres) of land. The family spoke Polish, but she learned the Samogitian dialect and secretly taught village's children to read and write in Lithuanian. She studied foreign languages (German, French) as well as art, literature, music at a girls' boarding school in Łomża. She married physician Liudas Vaineikis (15 years her senior) and they moved to Palanga in 1900. Together they organized the smuggling of banned Lithuanian publications. She continued this work even after Vaineikis was arrested and imprisoned in Liepāja. When Vaineikis was sentenced to the internal exile to Yakutsk in 1902, she voluntarily followed him.

When the Lithuanian press ban was lifted in 1904, she returned to Palanga while her husband moved to Tilsit. During the Russian Revolution of 1905, she helped him smuggle social democratic press and weapons across the Prussia–Russia border. During World War I, together with her husband, she retreated to Russia and lived in Central Asia (Kyrgyzstan, Emirate of Bukhara, Turkestan Autonomy). There, she witnessed power struggles, cruelty, and massacres.

=== Independent Lithuania ===
Vaineikienė returned to Palanga in 1921 and became involved in the city's life. She worked on reestablishing the Palanga Gymnasium: she chaired a committee set up to support the school, recruited qualified teachers, and worked as a teacher once the school opened in 1922. She also advocated for municipal water supply, sewer, and bath house. Together with others, she organized cooperative Talka. She contributed articles to the magazine Kultūra and supplied Samogitian words to the Academic Dictionary of Lithuanian. Together with her husband, she was elected to the first city council of Palanga in December 1932.

She participated in the Klaipėda Revolt in January 1923 and was awarded the silver Medal of the Liberation of Klaipėda.

Vaineikis' house in Palanga was visited by many prominent Lithuanians, including Jonas Jablonskis, Augustinas Janulaitis, Liudas Gira, Liūnė Janušytė, Vydūnas, Jonas Šliūpas, Jonas Basanavičius, Gabrielius Landsbergis-Žemkalnis, Matas Untulis.

=== Soviet Lithuania ===
After the Soviet occupation of Lithuania in June 1940, she became mayor of Palanga. She opened a public bath house and a weaving workshop. She was elected to the People's Seimas and became one of the 20 Lithuanian representatives sent to Moscow to request the official incorporation of the newly proclaimed Lithuanian SSR into the Soviet Union. In fall 1940, she became a member of the Supreme Court of the Lithuanian SSR and moved to Vilnius.

In 1940, during the German occupation, she published a short article claiming that she was selected for the People's Seimas without her consent and that she knew nothing about its agenda. In February 1945, after the Soviets returned to Lithuania, she disowned those claims stating that they were forced and edited by the Gestapo.

She died in Vilnius on 12 January 1946 and was buried in Rasos Cemetery.

== Works ==
=== Novels ===
In her novels Grafas ir žmonės (Graf and the People; published in 1937, republished in 1958) and Vaišvila, Žemaičių baudžiauninkų vadas (Vaišvila, Leader of Samogitian Serfs; 1938 and 1959), Vaineikienė wrote about the serfdom in Lithuania, its abolition in 1863, and social conflicts in villages. They were two of a few historical novels about serfdom in Lithuanian literature. The works depict everyday life and customs of a Lithuanian village and are examples of literary realism. There is little character development: characters are either good or bad. In particular, the nobility is portrayed as evil exploiters of the peasants. She also wrote a novel Lukštai about the Russian Revolution of 1905 in Samogitia, but the work was not published and the manuscript was lots.

=== Memoirs ===
She wrote three books of memoirs. Palangos atsiminimai (Memoirs of Palanga; 1931) is about the life and society in Palanga. The three-volume Iš praeities kovų (From Past Struggles; 1935–1936) talks about book smuggling in the Russian Empire, prison, and internal exile in Siberia. Based on her memoirs, Gintarė Adomaitytė wrote a play Deimantų dvaras (Diamond Manor) in 2007.

Vaineikienė wrote Pabėgėlės užrašai (Notes of a Refugee), a memoir about her life in Central Asia and the Russian Civil War. It was prepared for publication in December 1940, but it was not published as it did not reflect the official Bolshevik ideology. The book was published in 2014 (for her 130th birth anniversary). The memoir was translated into Russian and Uzbek and published in 2022 thanks to the efforts of the Uzbek professor Tursunali Kuziev.

== Personal life ==
Vaineikienė married physician Liudas Vaineikis in 1900. They had three children, including Liuda Vaineikytė (1908–1997) who was an active member of the Lithuanian Communist Party and merited artists of the Lithuanian SSR (1958).
