= Liudas Vaineikis =

- Born: 31 August 1869; Svirpliai, Kovno Governorate, Russian Empire
- Died: 17 January 1938 (aged 68); Kaunas, Lithuania
- Education: Mitau Gymnasium; Imperial Moscow University
- Occupations: Physician, activist, book smuggler
- Spouse: Stasė Vaineikienė
- Awards: Order of the Lithuanian Grand Duke Gediminas (1928)

Liudas Vaineikis (31 August 1869 – 17 January 1938) was a physician and notable member of the Lithuanian book smuggling movement during the Lithuanian press ban (1864–1904).

Already as a student at Mitau Gymnasium, Vaineikis joined the Lithuanian National Revival. He studied medicine at the Imperial Moscow University but was expelled when he was arrested together with member of Atgaja Society which he helped establishing in 1889. He managed to complete his degree at Kazan University and moved to Palanga to work as a physician. He continued to be involved in Lithuanian cultural life and smuggle illegal Lithuanian and social democratic publications. In 1899, he managed to obtain a government permit for America in the Bathhouse (Amerika pirtyje), the first Lithuanian-language theater performance in present-day Lithuania. He was arrested in 1900. His cased grew to involve many other prominent Lithuanian activists. He was sentenced to five years of internal exile in February 1902 but was released after the Lithuanian press ban was lifted in 1904.

During the Russian Revolution of 1905, he supported the Lithuanian Social Democratic Party and edited the party's newspaper Darbininkų balsas. After around 1908, he distanced himself from political work. During World War I, he worked as a doctor in Central Asia. He returned to Palanga in 1922 and unsuccessfully participated in the elections to the Seimas (Lithuanian parliament). He was elected to the first city council of Palanga in 1932, but the Lithuanian government would not approve him as deputy mayor. He died of a heart disease in Kaunas in 1938.

== Biography ==
=== Early life and education ===
Vaineikis was born on 31 August 1869 in Svirpliai in the present-day Joniškis District Municipality. He received his first education at home and at a primary school in Joniškis. He studied at the Mitau Gymnasium in 1881–1889 and joined the Lithuanian National Revival. He chaired a secret society of Lithuanian students, read the banned Lithuanian press, established contacts with revolutionary-minded workers' groups. In 1889, together with others, he established Atgaja, an illegal society of Lithuanian youth. Its members collected examples of Lithuanian folklore and smuggled Lithuanian publications.

Vaineikis continued his studies at the Medical Faculty of the Imperial Moscow University. He continued to be active in Lithuanian cultural life. He chaired an illegal society of Lithuanian students and organized financial aid for the publication of Lithuanian newspaper Ūkininkas. He was arrested in 1895 together with other members of Atgaja. He was held in Šiauliai Prison and exiled for three years to Kazan. Expelled from Moscow University, he managed to pass the final exams and obtain his medical license at Kazan University.

=== Activist ===
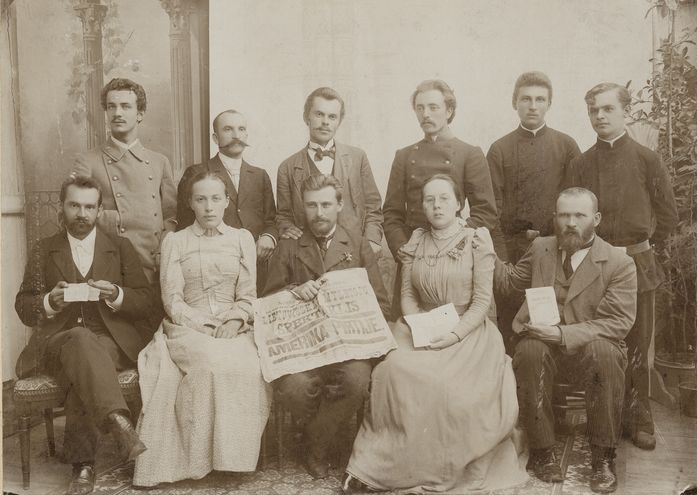
Organizers of America in the Bathhouse in Palanga. Vaineikis sit in the middle with the poster.

In 1897, he was allowed to move to Palanga (then part of the Courland Governorate) where he worked as a physician. He contributed articles to Ūkininkas, Varpas, Žemaičių ir Lietuvos apžvalga, maintained contacts with various Lithuanian activists, including socialists Andrius Domaševičius and Vincas Kapsukas. Living close to the Russia–Prussia border, he supported Lithuanian book smugglers and also organized the smuggling and distribution of Latvian and Russian social democratic publications. In 1899, he managed to obtain a government permit for America in the Bathhouse (Amerika pirtyje), the first Lithuanian-language theater performance in present-day Lithuania. In 1900, he assisted in organizing the display of Lithuanian publications at the world's fair in Paris.

In April 1900, Tsarist police seized four bundles of illegal publications: three with Russian social democratic texts and one with Lithuanian publications. Further investigation revealed that this cargo was organized by Vaineikis. When police searched his residence, they found a list of Lithuanians to whom Vaineikis sent the banned publications. Thus, the police began much wider investigations and searched many prominent Lithuanians resulting in multiple arrests. Vaneikis was arrested in 1900 and spent about two years at prisons in Mitau and Libau. On 27 February 1902, Tsar approved sentences (internal exile) of 23 Lithuanians, including Vaneikis, Augustinas Janulaitis, Jonas Jablonskis, Gabrielius Landsbergis-Žemkalnis, Rokas Šliūpas, Jonas Ambrozaitis, Vladas Požela.

Vaineikis was exiled to the Siberian city of Yakutsk for five years. His wife Stasė Vaineikienė voluntarily accompanied him. In 1904, he helped combat an outbreak of smallpox. He was released after the Lithuanian press ban was lifted in 1904. He then moved to Tilsit in East Prussia where he joined activities of the Lithuanian Social Democratic Party. Together with Andrius Domaševičius, he edited the party's newspaper Darbininkų balsas and supported revolutionary causes. Around 1908, Vaineikis shifted his focus to more cultural and anti-religious freethought work.

=== Later life ===
He worked as a doctor in Central Asia (Kyrgyzstan, Emirate of Bukhara, Turkestan Autonomy) between 1915 and 1920. There, he witnessed power struggles, cruelty, and massacres during the Russian Civil War. He returned to Palanga in 1921 and worked as a teacher at city's secondary school. As a representative of the Peasant Union, he unsuccessfully ran in the elections to the First Seimas of Lithuania in October 1922. As an independent, he also ran in the elections to the Second Seimas in May 1923. He supported the Communist Party of Lithuania and the Lithuanian Red Aid (his daughter Liuda was an active member of both).

Due to political disagreements with the regime of President Antanas Smetona, Vaineikis was forced to leave Palanga for Alsėdžiai. After his return to Palanga, he became the city's official physician. Vaineikis and his wife were elected to the first city council in December 1932. Vaineikis was selected as a deputy of mayor Jonas Šliūpas, but was not officially confirmed (ostensibly due his "old" age of 64).

For his contributions to the Lithuanian National Revival, Vaineikis was awarded the Order of the Lithuanian Grand Duke Gediminas (3rd degree) in 1928 and given a state pension of 380 litas.

Vaineikis died from a heart ailment on 17 January 1938 at the Jonas Basanavičius Military Hospital in Kaunas. He was cremated and, with the help of General Vladas Nagevičius, the urn with his ashes was added to a wall in the Vytautas the Great War Museum. It was removed during World War II and is now kept at the Anatomy Museum of the Lithuanian University of Health Sciences.

== Legacy ==
Vaineikis house in Palanga was demolished in 1973. At this location, a bust of Vaineikis by architect Rūsna Vaineikytė (Vaineikis' granddaughter) and sculptor Jonas Jagėla was erected in 1989.

== Personal life ==
In 1900, Vaneikis married Stasė Vaineikienė née Paulauskaitė (1884–1946) who was half his age. She became a strong supporter of his activities and helped smuggle the illegal publications. They had three children, including Liuda Vaineikytė (1908–1997) who was an active member of the Lithuanian Communist Party and merited artists of the Lithuanian SSR (1958).
