= Milvydai, Krakės =

Milvydai
- Village
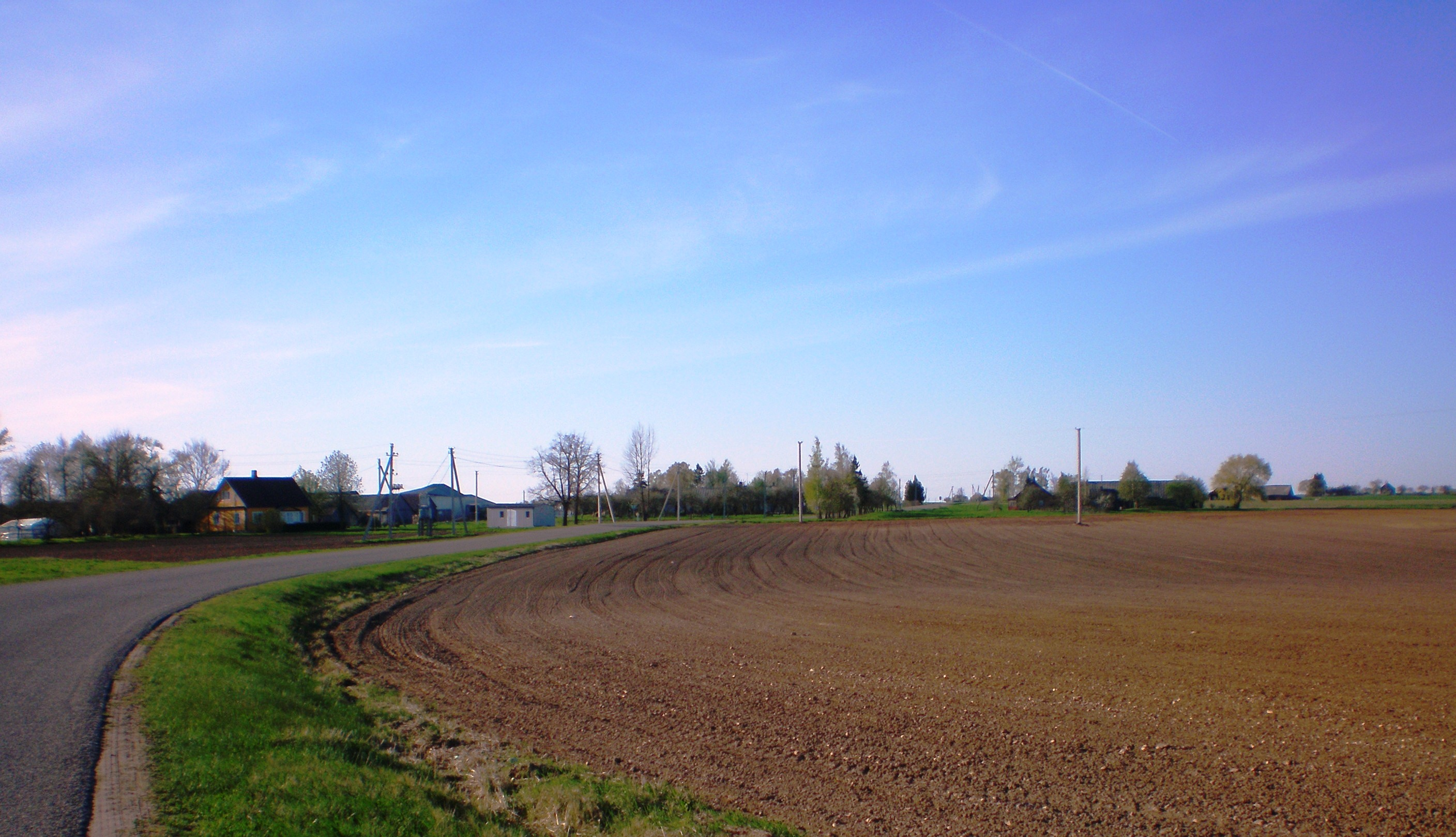

- Location in Lithuania Milvydai (Lithuania)
- Coordinates: 55°25′08″N 23°42′29″E
- Country: Lithuania
- County: Kaunas County
- Municipality: Kėdainiai district municipality
- Eldership: Krakės Eldership

Population (2011)
  - Total: 45
- Time zone: UTC+2 (EET)
  - Summer (DST): UTC+3 (EEST)

Milvydai (Melvidai, Milvidai, formerly Russian: Мильвиды, Polish: Milwidy) is a village in Kėdainiai district municipality, in Kaunas County, in central Lithuania. According to the 2011 census, the village had a population of 45 people. It is located 2 kilometres (1.2 mi) from Krakės, by the Krakės-Grinkiškis road, nearby the Smilgaitis river sources. There are an airstrip, a milk buying post and old cemetery of the Goštautai family.

== History ==
At the beginning of the 20th century there were Milvydai village and Milvydai estate (a property of the Goštautai).

== Demography ==
Historical population

Year	Pop.	±% p.a.
1902	144	—
1923	185	+1.20%
1959	112	−1.38%
1970	85	−2.48%

Year	Pop.	±% p.a.
1979	55	−4.72%
1989	25	−7.58%
2001	48	+5.59%
2011	45	−0.64%

Source: 1902, 1923, 1959 & 1970, 1979, 1989, 2001, 2011

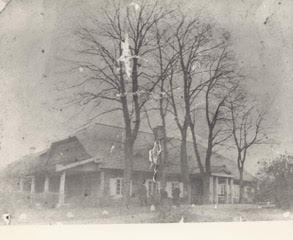
Milvydai manor c. 1900
