= Kazimieras Būga =

20th-century Lithuanian linguist and philologist

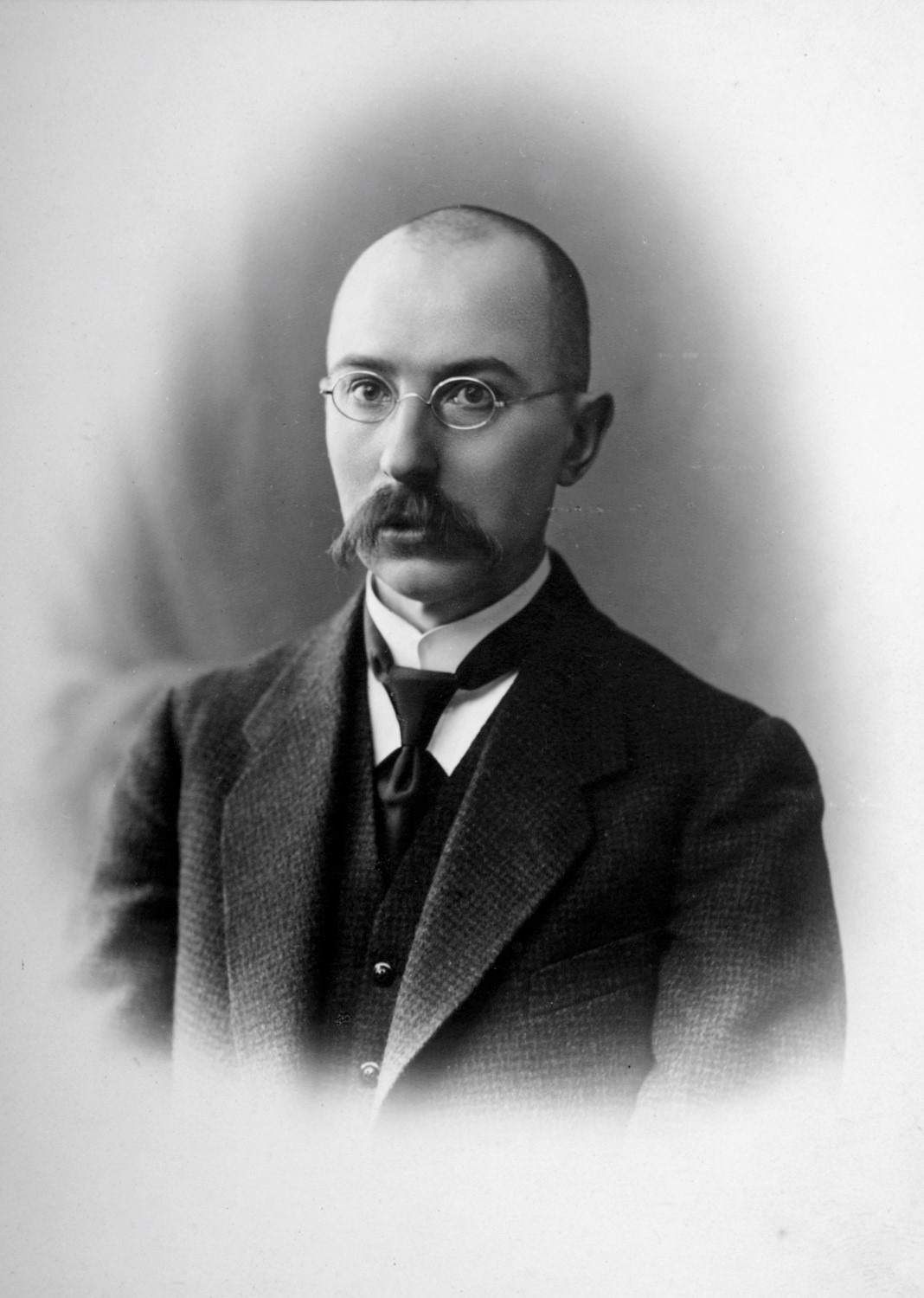
- Būga in Perm, ~1917
- Born: November 6, 1879; Pažiegė, Kovno Governorate, Russian Empire
- Died: December 2, 1924 (aged 45); Königsberg, Weimar Republic
- Burial place: Kaunas, Lithuania
- Occupation: linguist

Kazimieras Būga (Lithuanian pronunciation: [kɐˈzʲɪˈmʲiərɐs buːˈɡɐ]; November 6, 1879 – December 2, 1924) was a Lithuanian linguist and philologist. He was a professor of linguistics, who mainly worked on the Lithuanian language.

He was born at Pažiegė, near Dusetos, then part of the Russian Empire. Appointed as personal secretary to Lithuanian linguist Kazimieras Jaunius he showed great interest in the subject, and during the period 1905-12 studied at Saint Petersburg State University. After that, he continued his work on Indo-European language under the supervision of Jan Niecisław Baudouin de Courtenay. He later moved to Königsberg to continue his studies under the direction of Adalbert Bezzenberger. In 1914 he received a master's degree in linguistics.

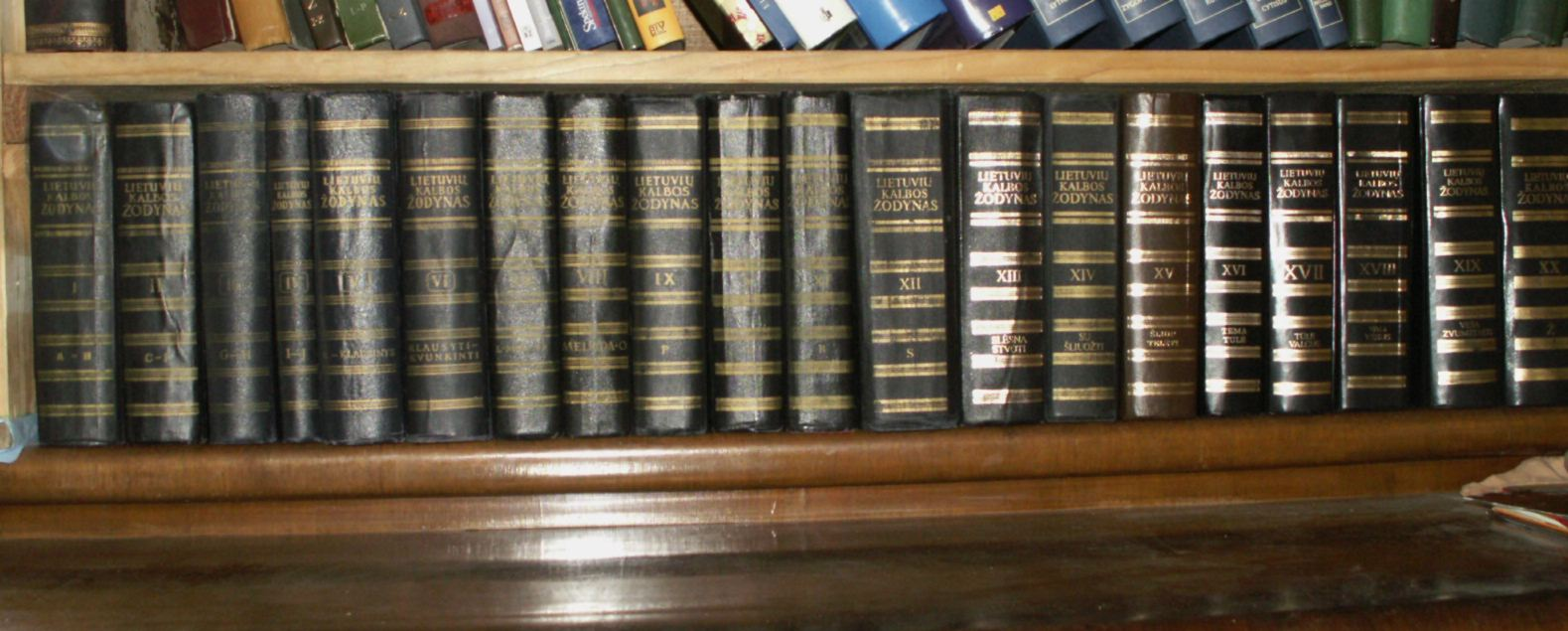
Academic Dictionary of Lithuanian, initiated by Būga

His research on Lithuanian personal names led him into the study of place-names. From these he was able to determine that the homeland of the Lithuanians and other Baltic peoples up to the 6th to 9th centuries CE had been just north of Ukraine in the area around the Pripyat River. In addition, he studied the chronological sequence of Slavic loanwords in the Baltic languages.

He also carried out a linguistic reconstruction of the names of the early princes of the Grand Duchy of Lithuania and refuted the theories of their Slavic origin. This became the main thrust for the concept of the Academic Dictionary of Lithuanian (Didysis Lietuvių Kalbos Žodynas) in Lithuanian. He died in Königsberg, and was buried at Petrašiūnai Cemetery in Kaunas.
