= Lucian Müller =

German classical scholar (1836–1898)

Lucian Müller (17 March 1836 – 24 April 1898) was a German classical scholar.

== Life ==
Müller was born in Merseburg in the Province of Saxony. After studying at the universities of Berlin and Halle, he lived for five years in the Netherlands, working on his Geschichte der klassischen Philologie in den Niederlanden (1869). Unable to obtain a university appointment in Germany, he accepted (1870) the professorship of Latin at the Imperial Historico-Philological Institute in St Petersburg.

He died in St Petersburg.

== Works ==
Müller's works display great erudition and critical acumen, and also feature bitter attacks on eminent scholars whose opinions differ from his own. He was a disciple of the methods of Richard Bentley and Karl Lachmann. His De re metrica poetarum latinorum (1861; 2nd ed. 1894) represents a landmark in the investigation of the metrical system of the Roman poets (the dramatists excepted), and his Metrik der Griechen und Römer (2nd ed., 1885) is an excellent treatise on a limited subject (Eng. trans. by Samuel Ball Platner, Boston, 1892).

His other chief publications were:

- G. Lucili saturarum reliquiae (1872), including the fragments of Accius and Sueius
- Leben und Werke des Gaius Lucilius (1876; suppt. Luciliana, 1884)
- edition of Horace (1869; 2nd ed. 1879; (Note: Written for the Bibliotheca Teubneriana.) 3rd ed. 1897)
- edition of Catullus (1870)
- edition of Phaedrus (1877)
- Quintus Horatius Flaccus, eine litterarhistorische Biographie (1880)
- Quintus Ennius (1884), an introduction to the study of Roman poetry
- Q. Enni carminum reliquiae (1884)
- Livi Andronici et Gnaeus Naevius fabularum reliquiae (1885)
- Der saturnische Vers und seine Denkmäler (1885)
- Noni Marcelli compendiosa doctrina (1888)
- De Pacuvii fabulis (1889)
- De Accii fabulis disputatio (1890)
- Ein Horazjubiläum (1892), contains a short autobiography
- edition of Horace's Odes and Epodes, with German commentaries (1882)
- edition of Horace's Satires and Epistles (1891–93)
