= America in the Bathhouse =

1895 play by Keturakis

America in the Bathhouse (Lithuanian: Amerika pirtyje) is a three-act comedy by Keturakis (pen name of brothers Antanas and Juozas Vilkutaitis). The play was first published in 1895. It became the first Lithuanian-language play performed in public in present-day Lithuania when a group of Lithuanian activists staged it on 20 August 1899 in Palanga (then part of the Courland Governorate, Russian Empire). The play depicts an episode from the everyday life of the Lithuanian village – a resourceful man swindles money from a naive woman and escapes to the United States. Due to its relevant plot, small cast, and simple decorations, the play was very popular with the Lithuanian amateur theater. It became one of the most popular and successful Lithuanian comedies of all time and continues to be performed by various troupes.

== Plot synopsis ==
Vincas, a resourceful tailor, gets a job with a struggling peasant Bekampis who desperately needs 200 rubles to repay his debts to Jew Faibčikas. In an inn, Vincas meets Antanas, an old acquaintance from their native village. Antanas is looking for a bride and has an eye on Agota, Bekampis' daughter. Vincas agrees to act as an intermediary – arrange a loan from Antanas to Bekampis and a marriage between Agota and Antanas. However, Vincas seduces naive Agota with stories about the easy life in America and convinces her to steal the money from her father. They plan to use the money to escape to America. Agota steals the money, but Vincas locks her in a bathhouse and runs away to America alone.

The play is rather simple and was well suited for the illegal amateur theater of the time. It depicts a scene from the ordinary lives of Lithuanian villagers and provides relevant commentary on the Lithuanian emigration to United States instead of more abstract or artistic characters or plot. Similar fraud and deception was described in Lithuanian newspapers of the time. It was also easy to stage as it needed only simple decorations and a limited cast (seven men and two women).

== History ==
=== Publication ===
During the Lithuanian National Revival, resisting various Russification and Polonization efforts, Lithuanians increasingly become more culturally active – published and distributed Lithuanian-language publications that were outlawed by the Lithuanian press ban, organized secret Lithuanian-language schools for children, established secret societies (cultural and educational societies were officially allowed only after the Russian Revolution of 1905), and hosted evenings with music, dances, games, and occasional amateur theater performances. Since there was a dearth of Lithuanian-language plays that could be performed during such evenings, Lithuanian monthly Varpas announced a contest for Lithuanian plays. Brothers Vilkutaitis using pen name Keturakis (it is not known which brother was the main author) submitted comedy America in the Bathhouse. Vincas Kudirka, editor of Varpas, liked the play and brought it to the christening of a daughter of Jonas Jablonskis in 1894. The gathering included other intellectuals who read the play. Few months later, during užgavėnės in 1895, Jablonskis staged the play in a school dormitory of the Mitau Gymnasium. Future President of Lithuania Antanas Smetona played the role of Faibčikas. Kudirka had the play published in 1895 in Tilsit, East Prussia (now Sovetsk, Kaliningrad Oblast). The first edition, 5,000 copies, sold for 10 kopeks. It was republished in 1905 in Saint Petersburg by Eduards Volters (1,000 copies). Ten percent of the proceeds were earmarked for the widows and orphans of the Russo-Japanese War. It was further republished in 1921 and 1937 in independent Lithuania and in 1966 in Soviet Lithuania.

=== First performances ===
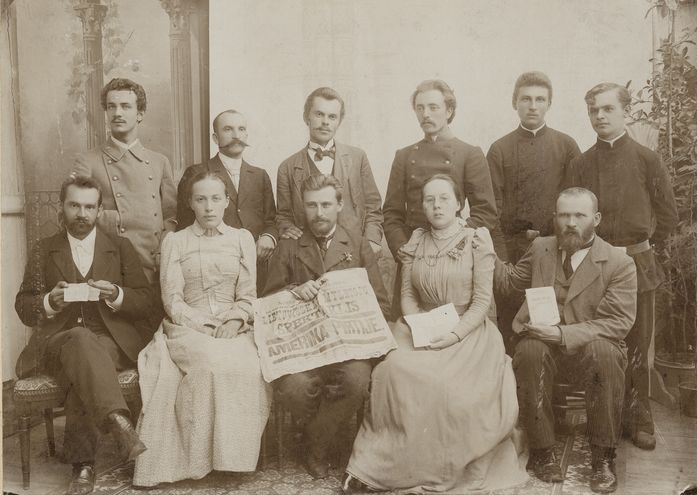
Organizers of Amerika pirtyje in Palanga. Liudas Vaineikis sits in the middle with the poster.

The play was popular. It was staged by different communities of Lithuanian Americans at least five times before the performance in present-day Lithuania in 1899. In the Russian Empire, the play was performed in Saint Petersburg on 12 February 1898 and in Riga on 25 April 1898. In 1899, Liudas Vaineikis, a Lithuanian physician living in Palanga and an active Lithuanian book smuggler, suggested to Gabrielė Petkevičaitė-Bitė to stage a public Lithuanian theater performance. Since Palanga was part of the Courland Governorate, Lithuanian activities attracted far less attention than in the Kovno or Vilna Governorates and it was much easier to obtain an official permit. Petkevičaitė started organizing the play. She selected America in the Bathouse as it was easy to stage and already approved by the state censors and recruited Povilas Višinskis to help with finding actors. They managed to get access to a shed owned by the Tyszkiewicz family that was built for performances by traveling troupes. There was only one performance on 20 August [O.S. 8 August] 1899. Despite various difficulties and a last-minute police interruption, the performance was a success and even netted a profit of 100 rubles that was donated to Vincas Kudirka. Vaineikis obtained a permit to stage America in the Bathhouse in Libau (Liepāja) during the winter break on 16 January 1900. The actors were mostly the same as in Palanga; Višinskis also recruited Jonas Biliūnas to play the role of the matchmaker. The same group managed to obtain permits to stage a different comedy, Devil Trapped (Velnias spąstuose), on 21 July in Libau and on 23 July in Mitau (Jelgava), but when Višinskis hung Lithuanian posters in Pašvitinys and Joniškis, the permits were revoked and actors were arrested and questioned by the police.

=== Later performances ===
The play became very popular and was performed by various groups illegally. Various peasants hosted the play in their barns, particularly in Suvalkija. For example, future Prime Minister Juozas Tūbelis staged the play in his father's barn in 1901. The play was also staged outside of Lithuania. Birutė Society staged it on 25 February 1900 in Tilsit, East Prussia (now Sovetsk, Kaliningrad Oblast). It was staged legally in Saint Petersburg in 1902 (three performances) and 1904. Mykolas Sleževičius staged the play in Odessa in 1904, while two performances took place in present-day Latvia in Subate in February 1904 and in Grīva in December 1904. When the Lithuanian press ban was lifted in 1904 and cultural societies were allowed in 1905, there were a number of legal performances in Lithuania, including on 31 October 1904 in Šiauliai (Kazimieras Venclauskis played Bekampis; Vincas Kapsukas turned the gathering into a political protest against the Tsar), on 6 February 1905 in Vilnius, by the Daina Society on 5 March 1905 in Kaunas, by politician Kazys Grinius on 28 May 1905 in Marijampolė, composer Stasys Šimkus on 2 November 1905 in Jurbarkas. The play was staged in Moscow in 1907. By World War I, it was performed over a hundred times.

The play continues to be a part of the Lithuanian theater repertoire. The Kaunas State Drama Theatre staged the play in 1974 (director Valdas Lencevičius). In 2014, the theater staged the 700th performance in Rumšiškės. In 2014, the play was performed in Georgian at the Rustaveli Theatre in Tbilisi. In October 2016, Musical Assemble Ainiai premiered a new interpretation by Nerijus Petrokas, musical comedy Is America in the Bathhouse?! (Ar Amerika pirtyje?!).
