= Pernarava =

- Town
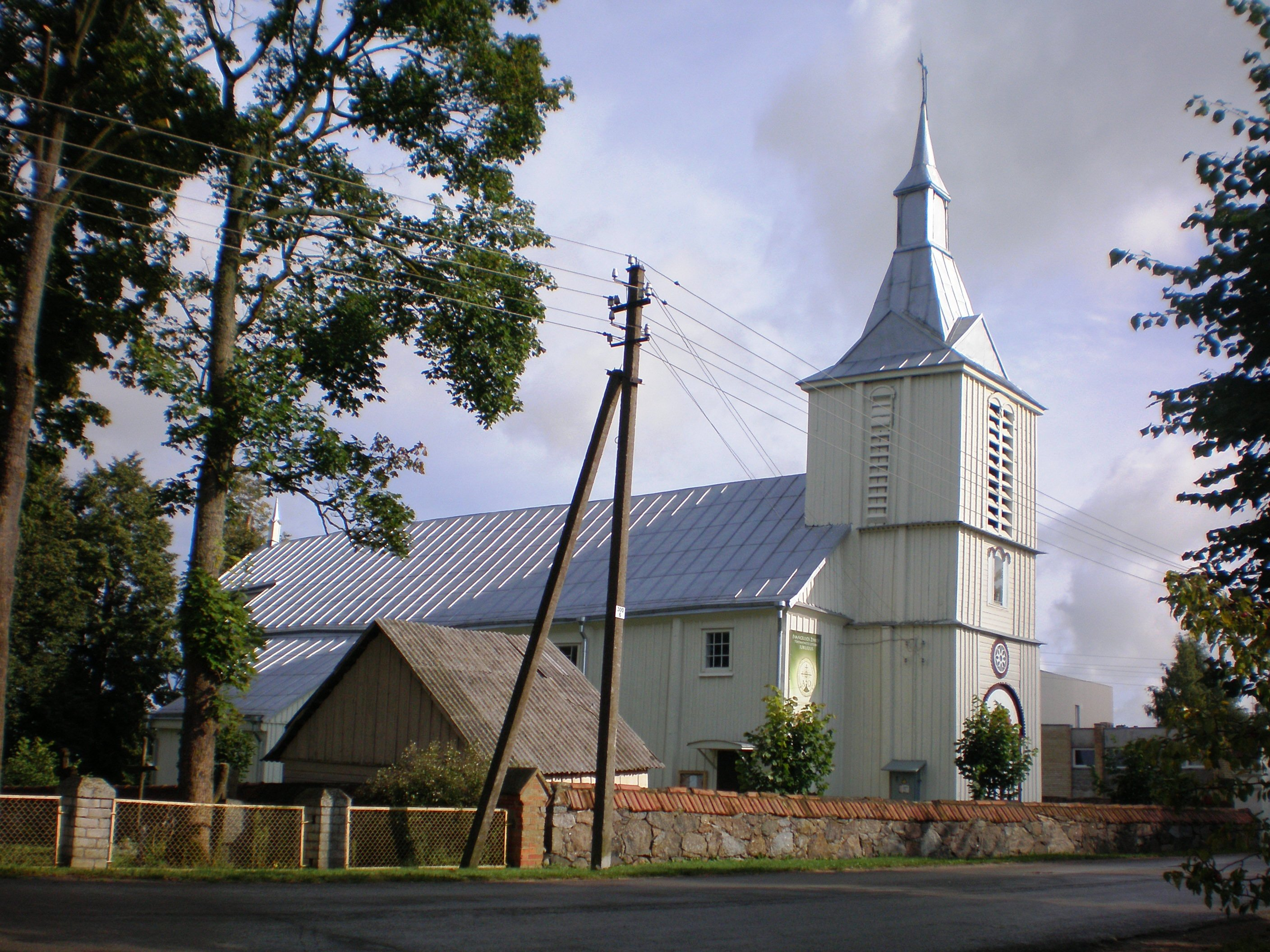
- Church of Pernarava

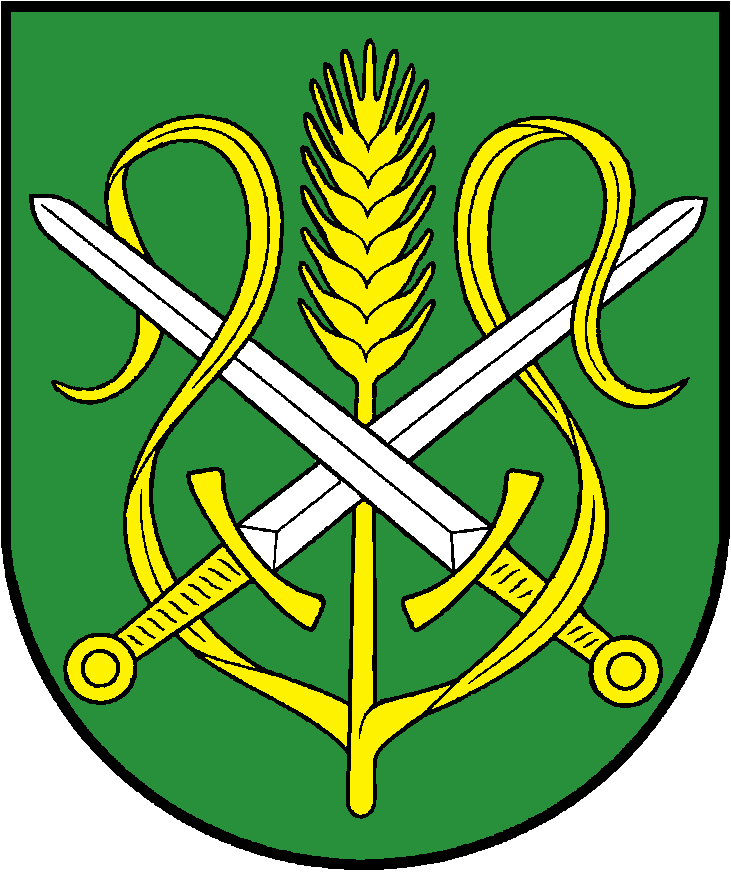
- Coat of arms

- Location in Lithuania Pernarava (Kėdainiai District Municipality)
- Coordinates: 55°16′10″N 23°38′40″E
- Country: Lithuania
- Ethnographic region: Aukštaitija
- County: Kaunas County
- Municipality: Kėdainiai District Municipality
- Eldership: Pernarava Eldership
- Capital of: Pernarava eldership

Population (2011)
  - Total: 232
- Time zone: UTC+2 (EET)
  - Summer (DST): UTC+3 (EEST)

Pernarava (formerly Russian: Пернараво, Polish: Pernarowo) is a small town in Kėdainiai District Municipality, Kaunas County in central Lithuania. In 2011 it had a population of 232. It is located 11 kilometres (6.8 mi) from Ariogala, 26 kilometres (16 mi) from Kėdainiai. There are wooden Catholic church of Crucified Jesus (built in 1815), dispensary, school, library, monument for postwar partisans of Kęstutis military district.

== History ==
The toponym Pernarava could be derived from unattested Lithuanian personal name *Pernaras (see similar Pernarauskas, Pernaravičius).

An ancient burial place (of the 1st-13th centuries) and 7 stone axes have been found in Pernarava. The name of Pernarava (as Parvern) has been mentioned the first time in 1371 after this place was devastated by the Teutonic Order. Pernarava manor, okolica and field have been mentioned at 16th century. The first church have been built in 1671.

At the end of the 19th century Pernarava was a property of Benedykt Tyszkiewicz. There were distillery, nursing home.

During the Soviet era Pernarava was a kolkhoz and selsovet center.

== Demography ==
Historical population

Year	Pop.	±% p.a.
1859	125	—
1902	128	+0.06%
1914	200	+3.79%

Year	Pop.	±% p.a.
1923	61	−12.36%
1959	120	+1.90%
1970	207	+5.08%

Year	Pop.	±% p.a.
1979	287	+3.70%
1986	267	−1.03%
1989	300	+3.96%

Year	Pop.	±% p.a.
2001	299	−0.03%
2011	232	−2.51%

Source: 1902, 1923, 1959 & 1970, 1979, 1989, 2001, 2011

== Images ==
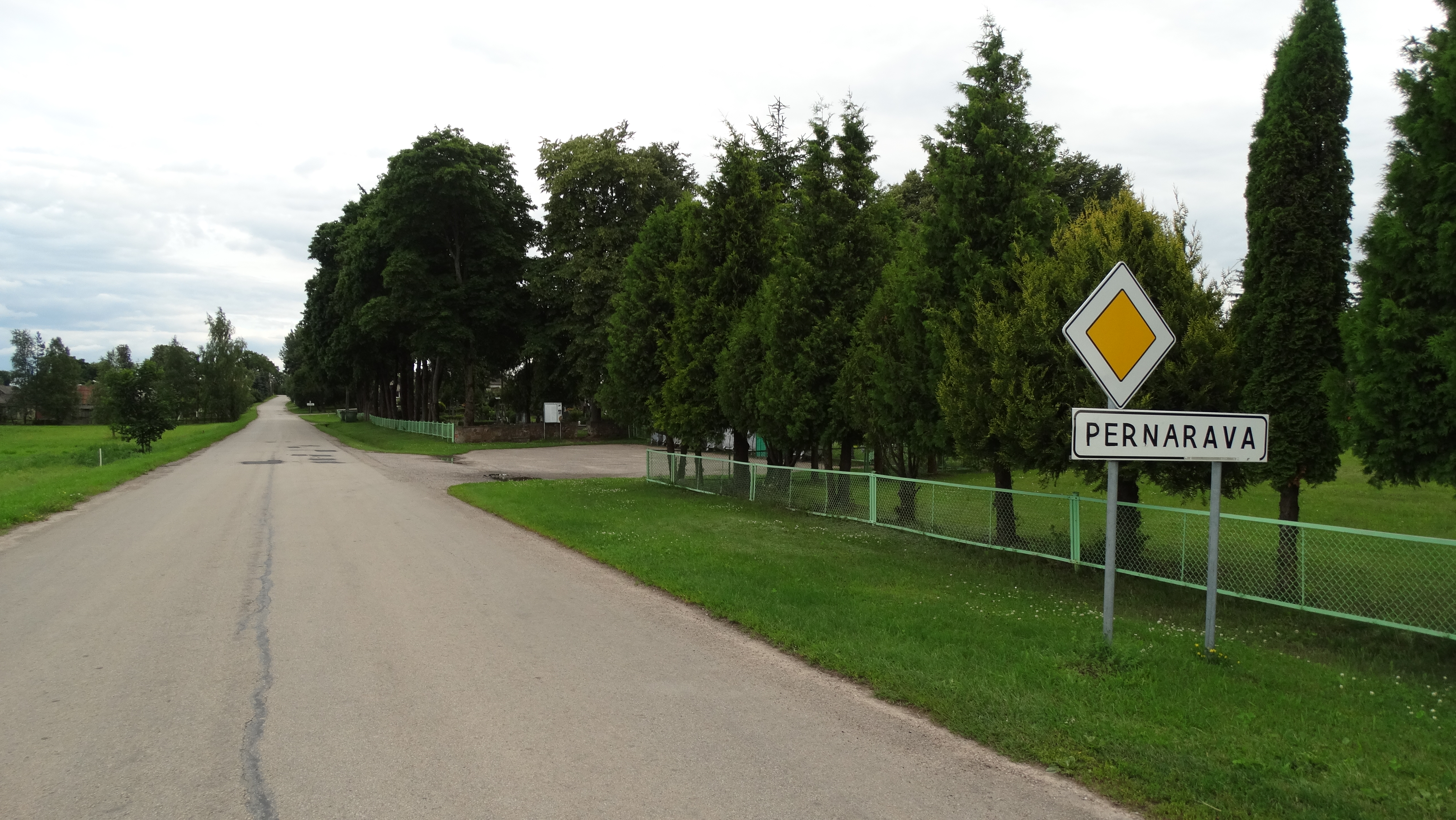
Roadsign

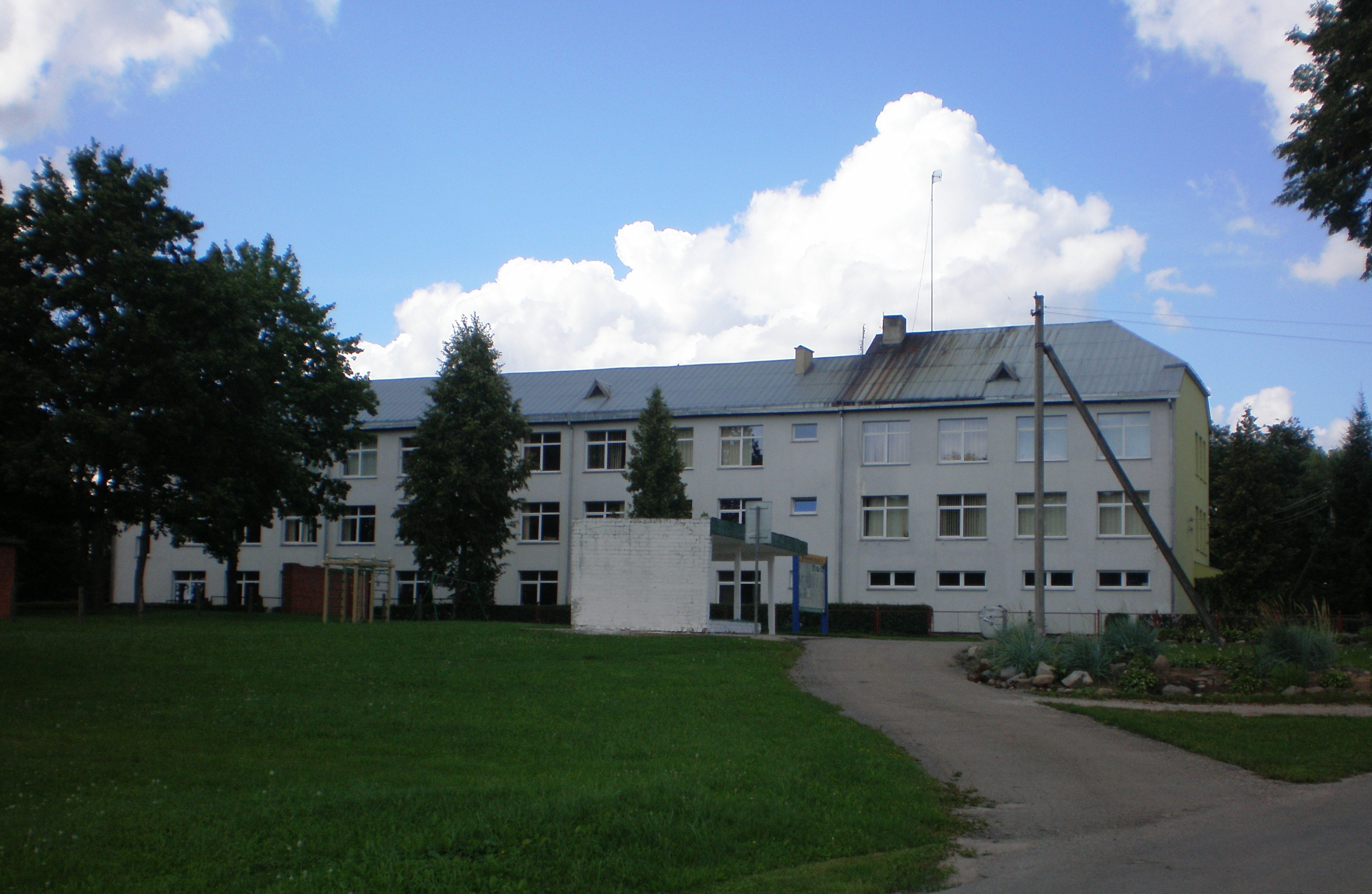
Pernarava school

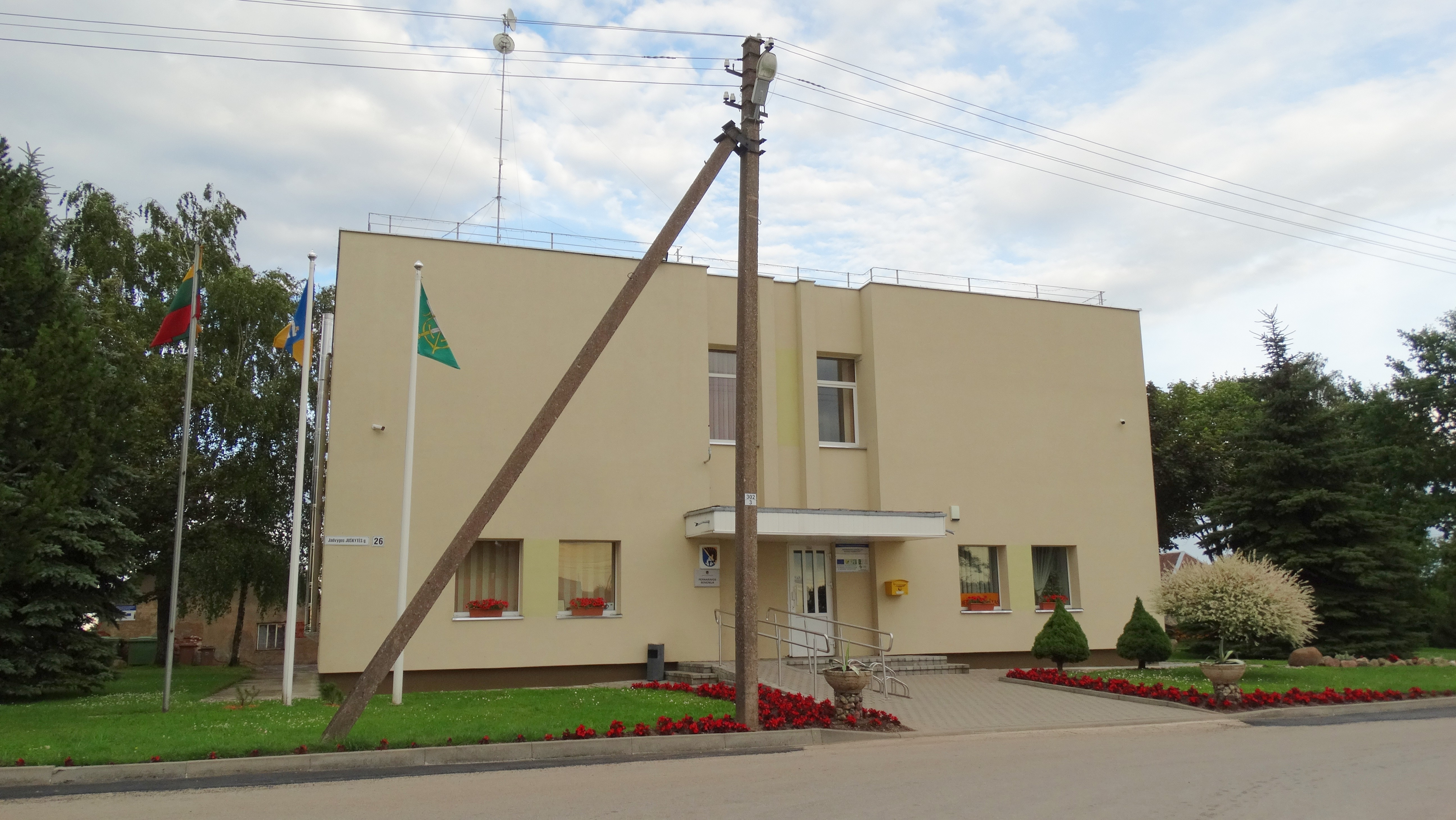
Eldership administration
