= Ariogala =

- Town
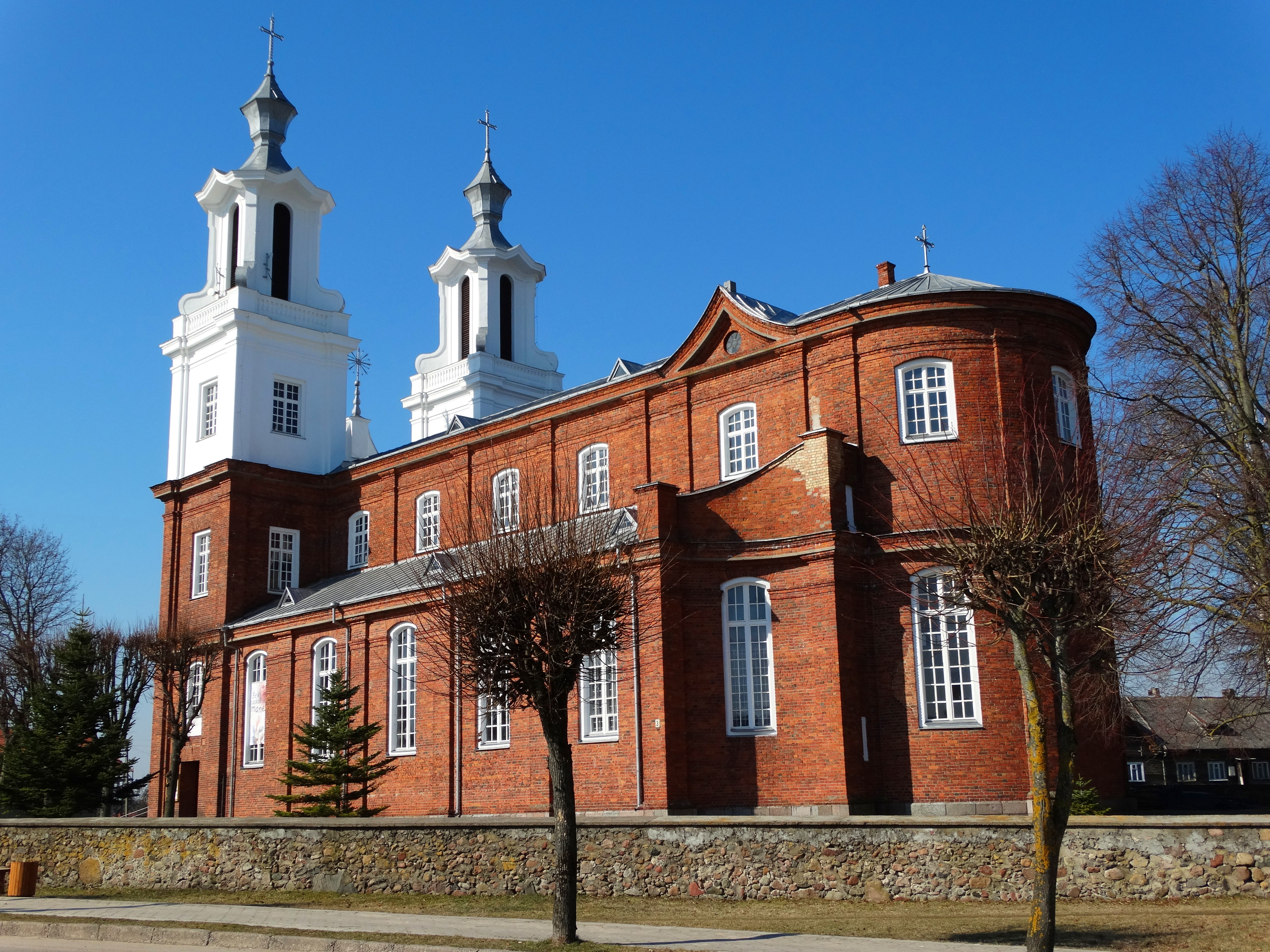
- Church of St. Michael the Archangel in Ariogala

- Flag Coat of arms

- Location of Ariogala
- Coordinates: 55°16′0″N 23°28′0″E
- Country: Lithuania
- Ethnographic region: Samogitia
- County: Kaunas County
- Municipality: Raseiniai district municipality
- Eldership: Ariogala eldership
- Capital of: Ariogala eldership
- First mentioned: 1253
- Granted town rights: 1792

Population (2021)
  - Total: 2,674
- Time zone: UTC+2 (EET)
  - Summer (DST): UTC+3 (EEST)

Ariogala is a town in central Lithuania. It is located on the Dubysa River, which flows through the town.

== Etymology ==
The name of the town has two components. The second "-gala" comes from the word "galas" (end, area, edge), while the origin of the first is unclear; it may have come from a person's name or surname (e.g., the surnames Arius, Arys) – so it may be an eponym, and Ariogala may originally have meant “region of Ari‑” or “borderland of Ari‑”. In 1848, Motiejus Valančius referred to it as Eirogalas in his writings. The current name of the town has been officially used since 1925 – until then, the most common form was Airiogala. Versions of the name in other languages include Samogitian: Ariuogala, Polish: Ejragoła, Russian: Эйрагола Eiragola, Yiddish: אייראַגאָלע Eyragole.

== History ==
Ariogala is one of the oldest settlements in Lithuania, known from 1252 or 1253 (when the land of Eregalle is mentioned), multiple times devastated by the Teutonic Knights. Ariogala is mentioned in Mindaugas' papers, in which he dedicated one half of the lands of Ariogala to the newly established Lithuanian diocese, which later in 1257 were handed over to the Bishop Christian of Livonia. In the 14th century there stood a wooden castle of Ariogala, which was burned down by the crusaders in 1382. During the times of Vytautas there stood Ariogala Manor. After the Battle of Grunwald better growth opportunities opened for Ariogala, so around 1416 first Christian church was built in Ariogala. In 16th century it was believed that Ariogala was a birthplace of Vytenis. From 1529 or 1592 Ariogala received a town status, and in the 17th century Ariogala's market and trading privileges are mentioned, Ariogala County established. On 12 April 1792, by king Stanislaw August's decree Ariogala was given the status of a free city based on Magdeburg Law, and a coat of arms for Ariogala was assigned; although in the summer of the same year due to changes in the political situation self-governing autonomy weakened, and in 1795 Ariogala's city rights were suspended by Imperial Russian government.

In 1842 Ariogala's public primary school was established, and in 1852 the Christian parish school was established that operated up until 1863. In 1847 Ariogala's Evangelical Lutheran Church was built, it was demolished in 1944. In 1880 post office was set up in Ariogala, that was burned down during the World War I. At the beginning of 20th century Ariogala's Hospital was established. In 1907 separate schools for boys and girls were established in Ariogala.

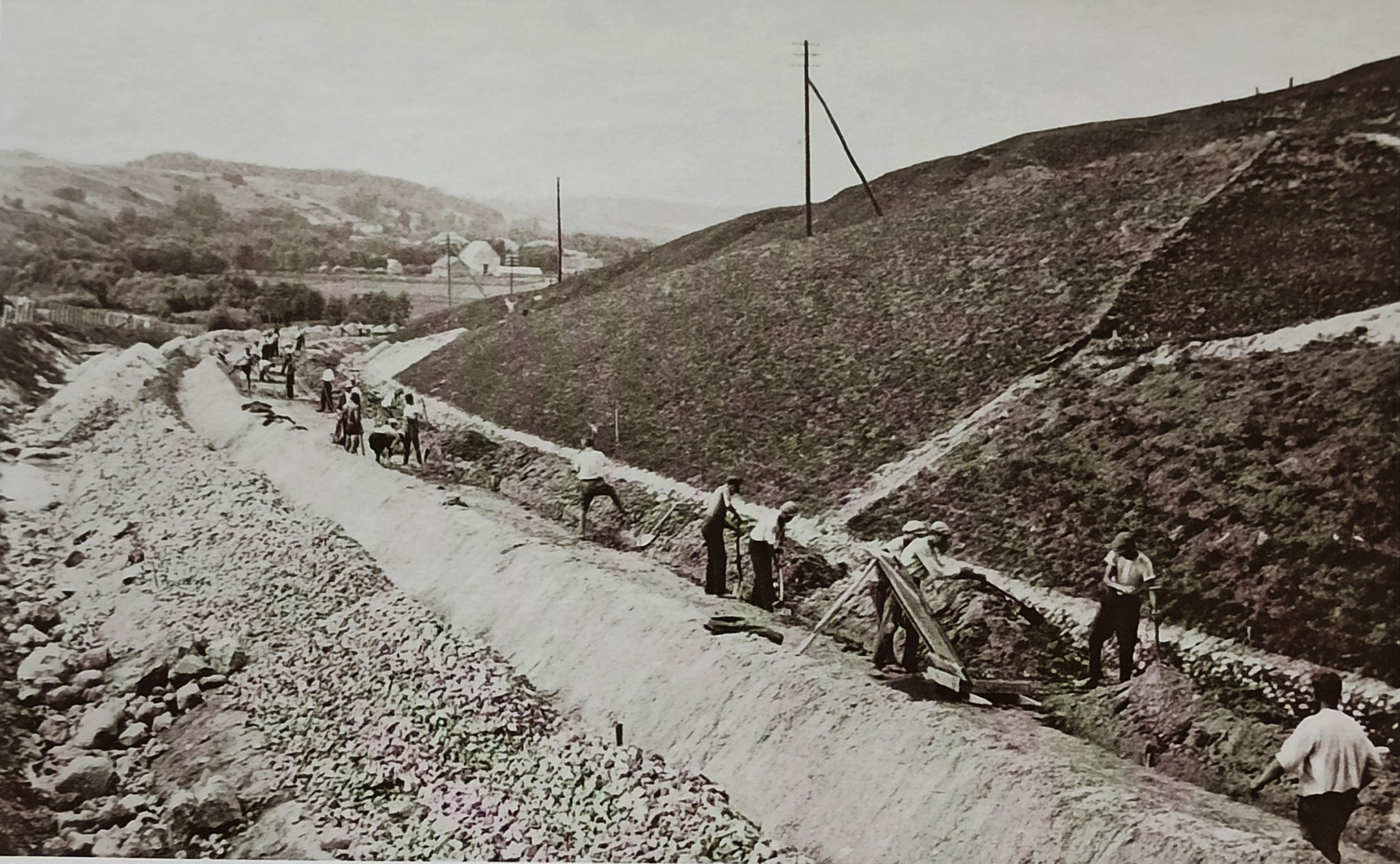
The Žemaičiai highway is being built near Ariogala, 1937

During World War II, the town was initially under Soviet occupation from 1940. The German military occupation of Ariogala started as early as June 1941. A month after the occupation began, all Jews from Ariogala and nearby villages were gathered in a ghetto, The Ariogala ghetto existed for approximately a month before some local police and members of the 3rd Company of the 1st (13th) Lithuanian Police Battalion gathered the remaining Jews in Ariogala on August 30, 1941 and shot and killed them en masse. These were approximately 700 Jewish men, women and children; the Battalion shot them in a field near the village. Killed Jews' property was auctioned off in Ariogala on September 1, 1941.

On 3 August 1944, the town of Ariogala was burned down and occupied by the Soviet Union army. After the war up until 1948 the United Kestutis partisan congregation – Vaidotas team of Anti-Soviet resistance was active in Ariogala area, the newspaper "Freedom Bell" was published. On 28 December 1956 city rights were reinstated. During the Soviet times a few industries were established in Ariogala: reinforced concrete factory, "AB Šatrija" sewing factory subsidiary, and office of the Raseiniai irrigation construction factory.

== Notable people ==
- Stasys Šalkauskis was born here

== Sources ==
- Kruglov, Alexander; Dean, Martin (2012). "Ariogala". In Megargee, Geoffrey P.; Dean, Martin; Hecker, Mel (eds.). Ghettos in German-occupied Eastern Europe. The United States Holocaust Memorial Museum Encyclopedia of Camps and Ghettos, 1933–1945. Vol. 2. Translated by Luft, Kathleen. Indiana University Press. pp. 1041–1042. ISBN 978-0-253-35599-7.
