= Paragiai Manor =

Historical manor in Paragiai, Lithuania

Coordinates: 56°6′21.6″N 22°37′35.8″E

Paragiai Manor (Lithuanian: Paragių dvaras) is a former wooden residential manor in Paragiai village, Papilė Eldership, Akmenė District Municipality, Šiauliai County, Lithuania.

== History ==
The manor was first documented in court records of the Samogitian land court in 1684, when Jonas Ivanauskas of Meškiai Manor is mentioned as owning land in Paragiai.

The Ivanauskas family (of the Rogala coat of arms) owned both Meškiai and Paragiai manors from the 17th century onward. In the early 19th century, the manor passed to Ksaveras Ivanauskas (died c. 1850), who had inherited both manors from his father and served in police special assignments in 1837–1839.

After a fire in the early 19th century, the manor house was rebuilt in its current form. Nikodemas Erazmas Ivanauskas (c. 1844 – c. 1932): his father Ksaveras handed him the manor; Nikodemas studied and lived abroad and returned to Paragiai around 1877.

Nikodemas married and in 1867 his daughter Sofija Pšibiliauskienė (b. 28 Sept 1867) was born. He then moved to Munich to study at the art academy; later he lived in Warsaw, Kraków and Šiauliai where his second daughter Marija Lastauskienė (b. 1 June 1872) was born.

Around 1877, the family returned to the Paragiai manor estate. In 1891, Sofija married Rapolas Pšibiliauskas, who lived nearby. However, the marriage was unsuccessful. Marija lived with relatives in Warsaw and later in Saint Petersburg; she married Belarusian public figure Vatslaw Lastowski but their marriage likewise ended in separation.

In 1940, the manor was nationalised and became part of the Tryškiai kolūkis (collective farm). In 1966 the manor house was converted into the Lazdynų Pelėda Memorial Museum.

== Present day ==
In 2012–2014, the manor underwent major restoration under the project "Paragių dvaro tvarkyba ir jo pritaikymas turizmo reikmėms", co-financed by the European Union structural funds and Akmenė district municipality.
