= Povilas Višinskis =

Lithuanian politician (1875–1906)

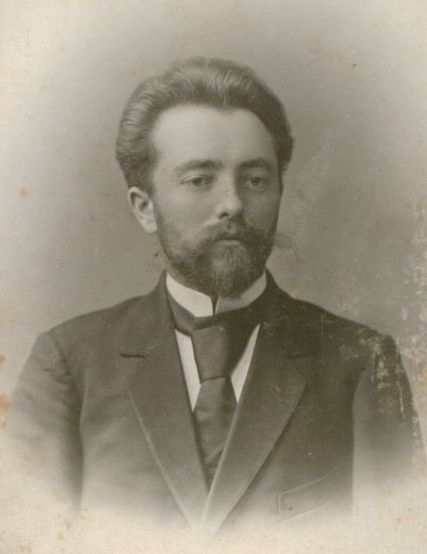
- Povilas Višinskis around 1903
- Born: 28 June 1875; Ušnėnai, Kovno Governorate, Russian Empire
- Died: 23 April 1906 (aged 30); Berlin, German Empire
- Resting place: Rasos Cemetery
- Other names: A. – s, Blinda, Spragilas, Apaštalas, P. Šiaulietis, P. Šaknis (in total, about 60 pen names)
- Education: Saint Petersburg University
- Political party: Lithuanian Democratic Party
- Movement: Lithuanian National Revival
- Spouse: Juzefa Mikuckaitė (1879–1942)

Povilas Višinskis (Polish: Paweł Wyszyński) was a Lithuanian cultural and political activist during the Lithuanian National Revival. He is best remembered as a mentor of literary talent. He discovered Julija Žymantienė (Žemaitė) and advised Marija Pečkauskaitė (Šatrijos Ragana), Sofija Pšibiliauskienė (Lazdynų Pelėda), Gabrielė Petkevičaitė (Bitė), Jonas Biliūnas, Jonas Krikščiūnas (Jovaras), helping them edit and publish their first works.

As a biology student at the Saint Petersburg University, Višinskis conducted anthropological research on Samogitians which included detailed anthropometric measurements. After the university studies, he returned to Lithuania earning a living as a private tutor in various locations (near Pašvitinys, Kurtuvėnai Manor, Šiauliai). Višinskis directed and played the main role in staging the first Lithuanian-language play America in the Bathhouse (Amerika pirtyje) in 1899. When advertisements for another play printed in Lithuanian using Latin alphabet were confiscated by police as violating the Lithuanian press ban, Višinskis sued and obtained a favorable judgment from the Governing Senate in 1903.

He contributed some 86 articles and 120 short correspondences to various Lithuanian periodicals, most notably Varpas, Ūkininkas, Naujienos, that were published in East Prussia and then smuggled into Lithuania. After the death of Vincas Kudirka, these newspapers suffered financial losses and frequent staff changes, and he stepped in to fill the leadership gap. He raised funds and addressed other printing issues, essentially becoming an unofficial editor of Varpas and leader of its contributors. He was an ardent opponent of the Tsarist regime and one of the first to declare that full independence was the ultimate goal of the Lithuanian National Revival. This ultimate goal was adopted by the Lithuanian Democratic Party, which he co-founded in 1902. After the lifting of the press ban in 1904, he moved to Vilnius and worked on publishing Lithuanian literature. He strongly supported the Russian Revolution of 1905, but advocated against armed resistance. He edited the first issues of Vilniaus žinios and Lietuvos ūkininkas, but quickly resigned due to ideological differences with their publishers. In 1905, he established Šviesa publishing company to publish Lithuanian books. The company operated until 1913 and published about twenty books. He died in 1906 of tuberculosis that he was first diagnosed with in 1896.

== Biography ==
=== Šiauliai Gymnasium ===
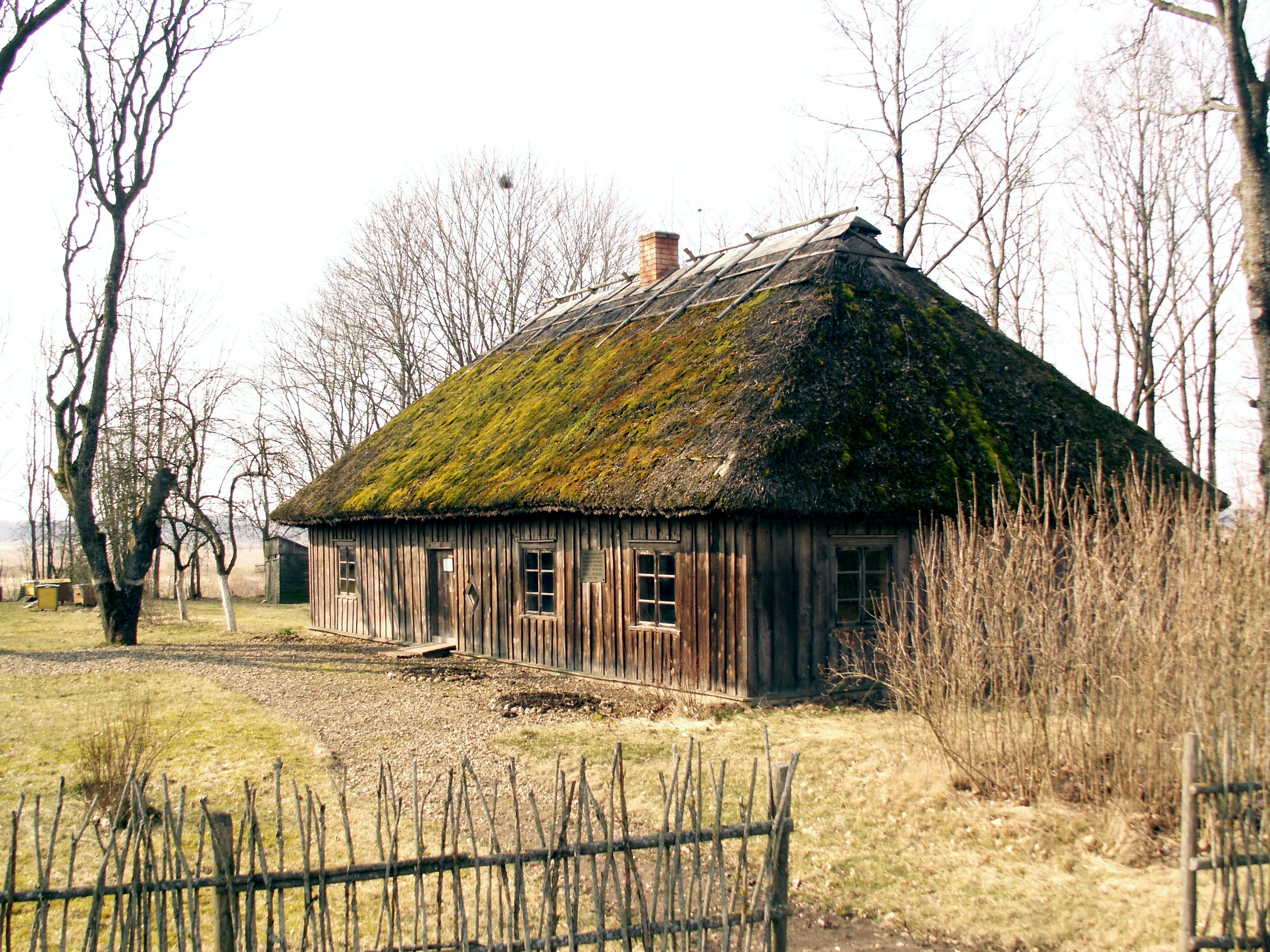
Višinskis' birthplace, now a memorial museum in 2008

Višinskis was born in 1875 in Ušnėnai near Užventis, Kovno Governorate, Russian Empire. His parents were free peasants (i.e. not former serfs) and owned about 29 hectares (72 acres) of land, but a good portion of it was unusable for agriculture. Višinskis was the youngest of five children. In 1884, his neighbor invited his brother with the family to help on the farm. The brother's wife was Julija Žymantienė who later with Višinskis' encouragement became the well-known writer Žemaitė. In 1885, after studies with a village tutor at home, Višinskis started the preparatory class at the Šiauliai Gymnasium. His parents hoped that he would become a priest. The tuition cost 35 rubles and dormitory cost another 120 rubles annually. It was a large sum, placing a financial burden on the family.

In Šiauliai, Višinskis became acquainted with the illegal Lithuanian press, including the newspapers Aušra and Varpas, and shared it with Žymantienė. Despite strict control by the school, he also read banned Russian authors, including What Is To Be Done? by Nikolay Chernyshevsky, works by Russian literary critic Vissarion Belinsky, Narodnik Nikolay Mikhaylovsky, Polish positivist Aleksander Świętochowski, fiction by Leo Tolstoy, Fyodor Dostoevsky, and others. He began sympathizing with Narodniks and their slogan "going to the people" in an attempt to teach the peasants to lift them up from poverty and misery.

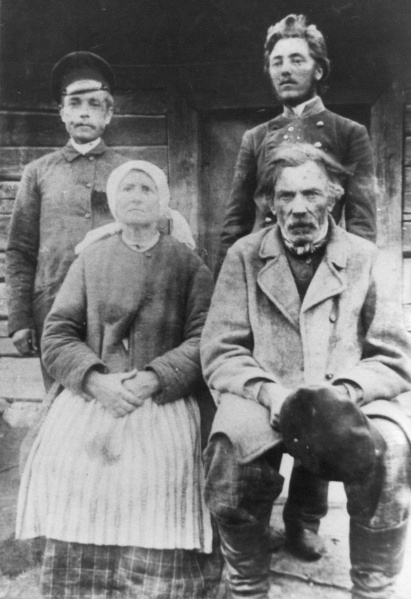
Višinskis (standing on the right) with his parents and brother in summer 1896

In summer 1891, manor owners in Užventis invited Višinskis to tutor their children, including Marija Pečkauskaitė who later became known as Šatrijos Ragana. She borrowed the pen name from one of Višinskis' letters where he called her ragana (witch). Višinskis introduced Pečkauskaitė to the Lithuanian National Revival, Narodnik ideas, and encouraged her to write the first poems and short stories. They developed a friendship and feelings that grew into tender love. From 1891, Višinskis worked as a tutor and supervisor of a student dormitory managing to pay the school tuition on his own. In 1894, Višinskis graduated from the gymnasium, but refused to follow his parents' wishes to study at the Kaunas Priest Seminary. Instead, he decided to study biology at the Saint Petersburg University. Angered and disappointed, his parents refused to support him financially.

In summer 1894, while waiting for paperwork from Saint Petersburg, Višinskis with schoolmate Vincas Kalnietis set out on foot to Kalnietis' village near Kamajai. Žymantienė gave him her first work Piršlybos (Matchmaking). On their trip, Višinskis and Kalnietis visited Gabrielius Landsbergis-Žemkalnis but received a rather cold welcome. In Joniškėlis, they visited Gabrielė Petkevičaitė-Bitė whose brother was a student at the Šiauliai Gymnasium. Višinskis gave her Žymantienė's manuscript. Petkevičaitė took the work to Jonas Jablonskis and Vincas Kudirka, who edited the work for grammar and spelling, changed the title to Rudens vakaras (Autumn Evening), and published it in farmer's calendar for 1895 under the pen name Žemaitė thus launching her literary career. From Joniškėlis, they went to find schoolmate Antanas Vadapalas, who he was at his sister's wedding to Kazimieras, brother of Jonas Vileišis. Finally, they visited Povilas Gaidelionis near Saločiai. There Višinskis learned about a man who drowned in Mūša and a local priest who tried to locate the body with a help of a miracle. His short correspondence mocking the superstitions was published in Ūkininkas in November 1894 – his first contribution to the Lithuanian press.

=== Saint Petersburg University ===
In September 1894, Višinskis began studies of biology at the Saint Petersburg University. His roommate was Vincas Kalnietis, a classmate from Šiauliai, who studied law. At the time, the university had 2,768 students of which 536 studied biology. Of them, only about 5% were sons of peasants (others were sons of nobility or government officials). Višinskis attended lectures of botany by Andrey Beketov, anatomy by Peter Lesgaft, histology by Alexander Dogiel, organic chemistry by Nikolai Menshutkin, geology by Vasily Dokuchaev, and other famous professors. He struggled with chemistry and physics, the latter he failed and was required to repeat the first year. He also attended meetings of the Russian Anthropological Society and the Imperial Russian Geographical Society.

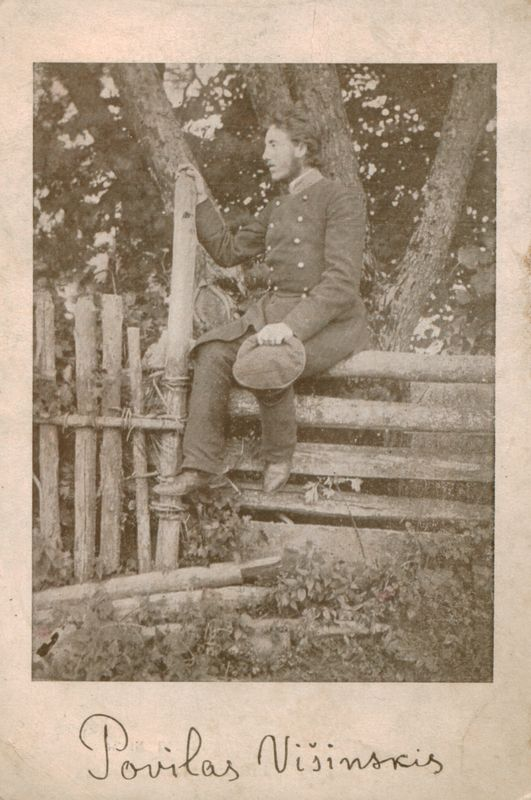
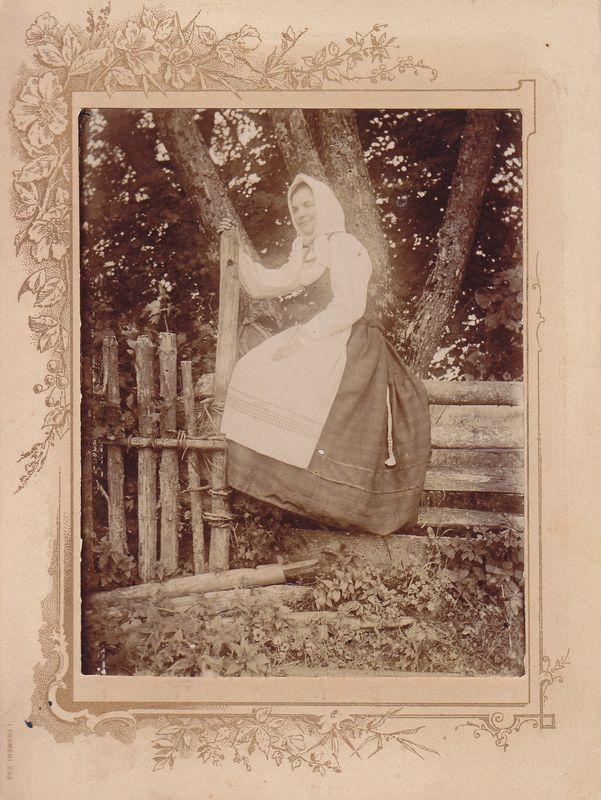
Višinskis (in a student uniform) and Pečkauskaitė (in a traditional Lithuanian dress) in August 1896 in Užventis

He continued to participate in Lithuanian cultural life, writing his first fiction Paparčių žiedai (Fern Flowers) during the Christmas break in 1894. He gave the work to Pečkauskaitė to read and she sent it to Varpas to publish. He also contributed articles to Varpas. For example, in spring 1895, he translated an articles from Novoye Vremya and wrote a report on the All-Russian Exhibition of Printing both of which addressed the Lithuanian press ban, while a year later he wrote about the Czech National Revival and Matice česká. Višinskis joined the Lithuanian and Samogitian Charitable Society, but it was conservative and dominated by nobles. Therefore, he leaned towards the illegal Lithuanian student organization. He recruited several members, firstly Petras Avižonis, to help edit and critique works by Pečkauskaitė and Žymantienė and thus established an informal Lithuanian literary circle. The writers sent him their first works for feedback and edits before submitting them for publication. He encouraged Pečkauskaitė to write on social issues in literary realism style, but her strength was in impressionist expression of spirituality. In Saint Petersburg, Višinskis discovered another literary talent – poet Pranas Vaičaitis who studied law. Višinskis sent three of his poems to Varpas even though the editors discouraged submissions of poetry as too many of the submitted poems were too amateurish.

Each year, the university organized a competition of scientific papers on a given topic. In 1896, the topic was anthropological characteristics of one of the nationalities inhabiting the Russian Empire. With encouragement and support from professors Eduard Petri and Eduards Volters, Višinskis set out to write a paper on the Samogitians. He acquired equipment necessary to take anthropometric measurements, a box camera for taking pictures, and a permit from the Kovno Governor to tour Samogitia. In late May 1896, he traveled to his native Ušnėnai to start the fieldwork. His questionnaire contained 64 questions and 45 measurements. He visited 31 locations, including Varniai, Tverai, Plungė, Salantai, Mosėdis, Ylakiai, taking about 170 photographs and measuring 67 men and 55 women. During the trip he met Sofija Pšibiliauskienė who later became a known writer under the pen name Lazdynų Pelėda. At the same time, he had a falling out with Pečkauskaitė who rebuffed his advances. They continued to correspond, but the letters were more distant and more focused on her literary work.

=== Winters in Crimea ===
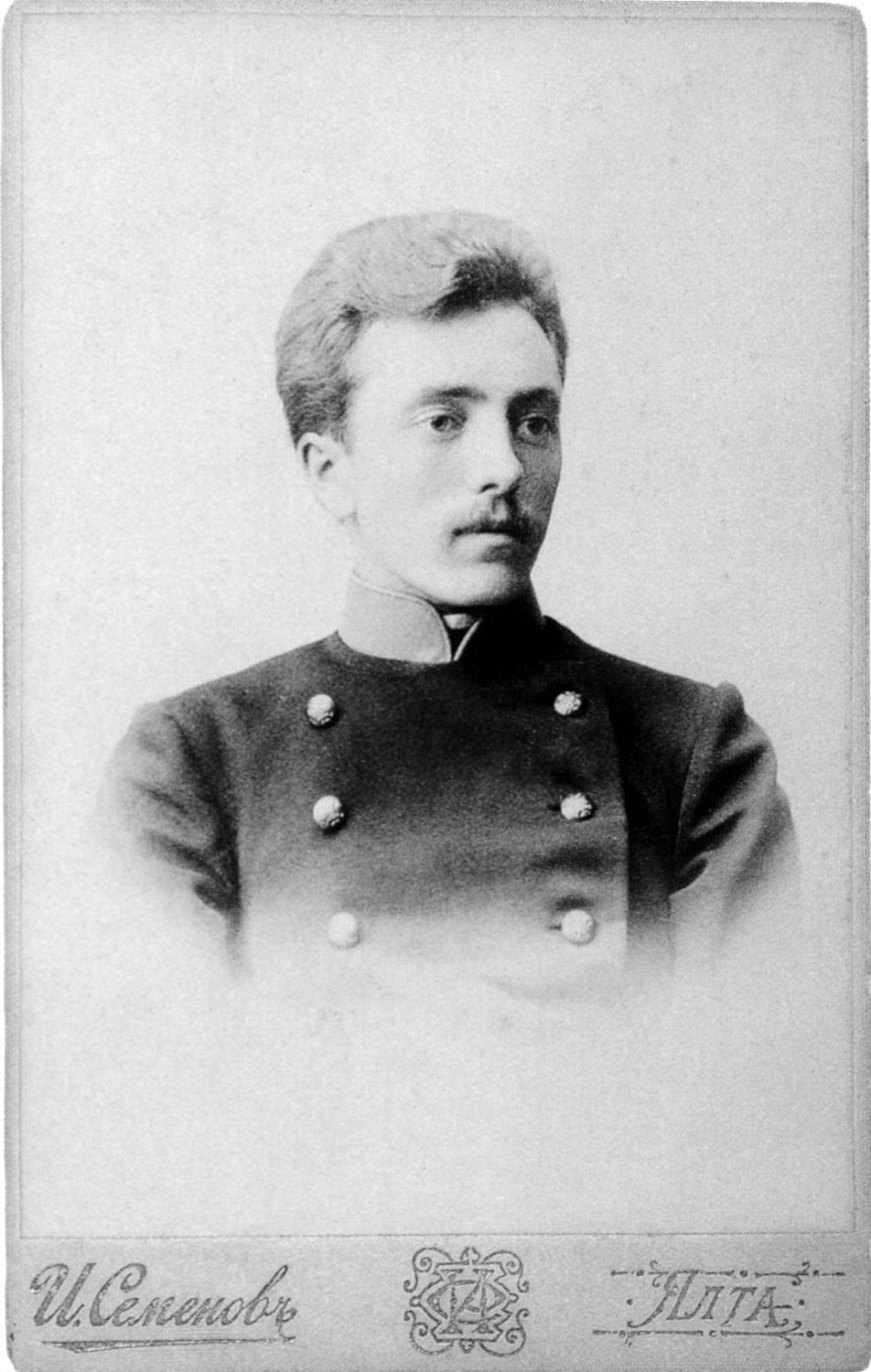
Photo of Višinskis in Yalta in 1898

He struggled financially. He tutored whenever he could find work or a break in a full class schedule. He ate poorly, often drinking just tea instead of a meal, which negatively affected his health. In October 1896, he was diagnosed with tuberculosis and was sent to Crimea to recover. He found a place with Toropovs at their manor on the road from Yalta to Sevastopol until the end of January 1897. He spent that winter in his native Ušnėnai, returning to Saint Petersburg only for exams in April. At the same time, Višinskis translated Pečkauskaitė's Pirmas pabučiavimas (First Kiss) from Polish to Lithuanian. He spent the summer of 1897 in Lithuania. He organized a meeting of a small group of students with Stasys Matulaitis, editor of Varpas, in Šiauliai. He then brought Matulaitis and Avižonis to meet Žymantienė in person. A few days later, he met Jonas Jablonskis who visited Žymantienė. Višinskis also continued to work on his anthropological research, taking additional measurements in the Raseiniai area. He returned to Saint Petersburg only to be diagnosed with tuberculosis in September 1897.

Višinskis once again traveled to Crimea to recuperate. He found a job in Yalta tutoring the son and nephew of Nikodim Kondakov, a noted art historian. It was a well-paid position (40 rubles a month plus full room and board) and he was able to send some money to his parents who were in debt. Višinskis continued to work on his anthropology paper, which was due in December, asking Žymantienė to send descriptions of some local dishes and traditions as well as samples of Samogitian folk art, including 75 samples of home-weaved fabric. His 133-page work had five chapters: historical overview, geography (including borders, waters, geology, climate, fauna, flora), physical characteristics (anthropometric measurements), material culture (buildings, tools, food, clothes, occupations), and spiritual culture (character, beliefs, superstitions, games, dances). The last chapter was the longest. The paper was left unfinished due to lack of time and study material. For example, he planned but failed to describe wedding traditions or songs, listed 29 dances without describing them, provided raw measurement data without a summary of findings. Despite the shortcomings, the work placed third in the contest. The study was first partially published with an introduction by Vincas Krėvė-Mickevičius in 1935. The full text, but without measurement data, was published in 1964 in Višinskis collected works. The full work was finally published in 2004 by Gintautas Česnys.

At the same time he worked intensively with Žymantienė explaining her the theory of literature, helping her improve characterization and explaining the basics of comedy (i.e. that in addition to making people laugh, a comedy should educate people and poke at the shortcomings of the society). In Yalta, he met Olga, daughter of Nikolay Umov, and she became interested in Žymantienė's life story. With her introduction, Višinskis translated a sample of Žymantienė's work to Russian and sent it to Nikolai Storozhenko for evaluation. But it was one of her weaker works, depicting a perfect and happy couple, and Storozhenko replied that it was a sentimental work with sugary characters but with well-written scenes of nature.

In June 1898, Višinkis returned to Lithuania. He met with Gabrielė Petkevičaitė-Bitė and Petras Avižonis in Joniškėlis and they decided to visit Vincas Kudirka, the publisher of Varpas living in Naumiestis in Suvalkija. On their trip they were joined by Jadvyga Juškytė and her sister Marija. They visited Tadeusz Dowgird, archaeologist and artist, and Petras Kriaučiūnas, teacher and book smuggler. The police allowed them to spend only 12 hours in Naumiestis. They found Kudirka terminally ill with tuberculosis but still working on Lithuanian press. On their way back, the group stopped in Kaunas to visit Kazimieras Jaunius, priest and linguist. After the trip, Juškytė gave him her first short story Ubagė (Beggar) which he praised, be she declined to publish. In September 1898, Višinkis returned to Saint Petersburg only to be diagnosed with a chronic inflammation of his lungs within three weeks. Once again, he spent the winter in Yalta earning a living from tutoring. He continued intense correspondence with Žymantienė who was working on various comedies with Petkevičaitė-Bitė.

=== First theater performances ===
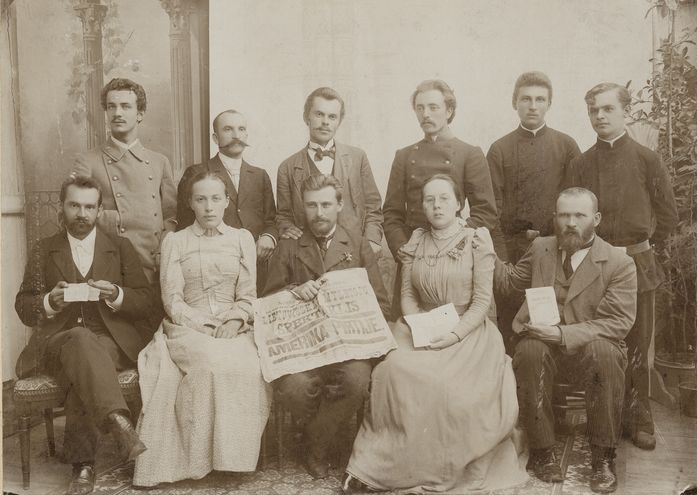
Organizers of America in the Bathhouse in Palanga. Višinskis stands third from right. Liudas Vaineikis sits in the middle with the poster.

In spring 1899, Višinkis returned to Lithuania. He first visited Šiauliai where he met members of the intelligentsia and developed a friendship with Augustinas Janulaitis, at the time law student at the University of Moscow. He then went on to visit Petkevičaitė-Bitė who recruited him to organize the first Lithuanian-language theater performance in Palanga, which was part of the Courland Governorate where anti-Lithuanian Russification policies were less strictly enforced. Therefore, Liudas Vaineikis was able to obtain an official permit for the performance. They settled on a comedy America in the Bathhouse (Amerika pirtyje), which required only nine actors and simple props and was already performed in Saint Petersburg and thus had been approved by the state censors. Višinkis played Vincas, the main villain, who conned the naive Agota, played by Stanislava Jakševičiūtė, who dreamed of immigration to America. Other actors included Jadvyga Juškytė and Augustinas Janulaitis. The performance on 8 August 1899 was a critical and commercial success. After the performance, Vaineikis took Višinskis and Avižonis to Tilsit in East Prussia, the major publishing center of the illegal Lithuanian press. On their way back, they visited Juozas Tumas-Vaižgantas in Kuliai and Sofija Pšibiliauskienė near Tryškiai.

Višinskis did not return to Saint Petersburg and obtained a tutoring job at a manor near Pašvitinys. In November 1899, he received a certificate that he had completed the full course at the Saint Petersburg University. As a Lithuanian and Catholic, he could not obtain a job at a government institution and was forced to continue working as a tutor. He continued to devote his energy to the Lithuanian cultural life. He resumed writing correspondences to Varpas and worked to organize the next Lithuanian play. He wanted to find a different work to stage, particularly since Žymantienė and Petkevičaitė-Bitė tried their hands at comedies. He pushed them to write Velnias spąstuose (The Devil in A Trap) in a week. Vaineikis obtained a permit to stage America in the Bathhouse in Liepāja during the winter break on 16 January 1900. The actors were mostly the same as in Palanga; Višinskis also recruited Jonas Biliūnas to play the role of the matchmaker.

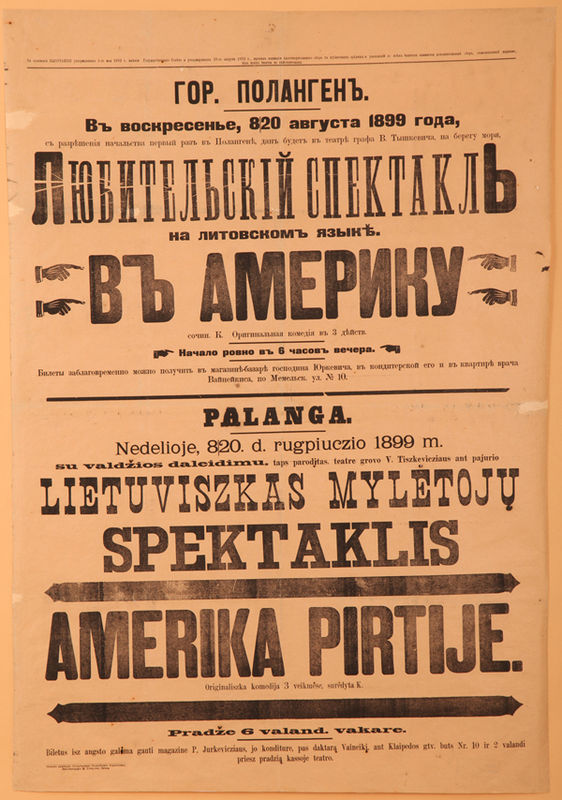
Russian and Lithuanian poster advertising America in the Bathhouse in Palanga. Višinskis was tried for posting similar posters in Pašvitinys and Joniškis.

In spring 1900, Višinskis responded for a call for Lithuanian exhibits to the world's fair held in Paris by sending 70 photographs and 16 items, including kanklės. Vaineikis was arrested in May 1900, but Janulaitis managed to obtain a permit to stage Velnias spąstuose on 21 July in Liepāja and on 23 July in Jelgava. The posters and programs were published in both Russian and Lithuanian languages. Since the performance was legal, Višinskis decided to hang the posters in Pašvitinys. The police soon tore it down as an illegal Lithuanian-language sign. He then posted them again in Joniškis for which he was put on trial. The permit for theater performances was revoked and several Lithuanian activists, including Janulaitis, were arrested. Many others were searched or questioned, including Višinskis on 23 August, Petkevičaitė-Bitė on 13 October, Avižonis on 7 September, Bilūnas on 13 October, Pečkauskaitė on 5 December 1900. A total of 24 people received various sentences (mostly a few years of exile in the interior of Russia) in February 1902. Nevertheless, Višinskis continued to contribute articles and reports to Varpas using a multitude of pen names, including some of those used by the arrested people, to confuse the police.

=== Illegal public work ===
In winter 1900–1901, Višinskis had another falling out with Pečkauskaitė. He once again confessed his love, but was rebuffed. They also deported in their political ideologies – Višinskis held liberal anti-clergy opinions while Pečkauskaitė leaned towards the church. She wrote to the Catholic press, her works starting to show elements of religious morality, but continued to ask Višinskis for critique. Nevertheless, they did not cut off the relationship and continued to correspond on literary matters. Characters, inspired by Višinskis, appeared in Pečkauskaitė's works, particularly as Jonas in well-received Viktutė.

He wrote many articles for Varpas and in May 1901 published Credo. Kilk ir kelk! (Credo. Climb and lift!) which spelled out that independent Lithuania was the ultimate goal and that the Tsarist government was their main adversary. The article was vague on how to achieve this goal or how to fight the government, but it elicited a political discussion. It was the first clear and unambiguous declaration calling for an independent Lithuania that, due to Višinskis' efforts, was later adopted as an official goal of the Lithuanian Democratic Party. The clergy replied in Tėvynės sargas by rejecting the idea of full independence as a pipe dream, instead arguing for autonomy and professing loyalty to the Tsar. In summer 1901, on the Feast of Saints Peter and Paul, members of the intelligentsia gathered under the pretext of celebrating the name day of Petkevičaitė-Bitė's father in Puziniškis. The gathering, also attended by Jonas Biliūnas and Vincas Kapsukas, discussed Credo and the efforts to coordinate literary work.

In fall 1901, he found a new tutoring position at the Kurtuvėnai Manor. While its owner disapproved Lithuanian activities, the locations was much closer to Šiauliai where could more easily reach other members of the intelligentsia, including Biliūnas with whom he developed a close friendship. He continued to look for literary talent and found Jonas Krikščiūnas (also known by his pen name Jovaras) and Merkelis Račkauskas. At the same time, he met Polish archaeologist Ludwik Krzywicki and helped him collect information on Samogitian hill forts and tumuli. Višinskis translated one of Pečkauskaitė's works to Polish and sent to Krzywicki in Warsaw. In early 1902, he also met Juzefa Mikuckaitė, a midwife, whom he married on 1 March 1905 in Čekiškė. Later in 1902, he began corresponding with Jonas Basanavičius, who at the time lived in the Principality of Bulgaria, and recorded ten folktales for his collection.

Višinskis become more and more involved in Varpas publishing. He sent letters to the editors of Varpas advising them of publishing matters and collected donations to compensate for financial losses. In October 1902, he organized and chaired a meeting of Varpas publishers and contributors in Dabikinė Manor. The meeting was attended by Biliūnas, Kazys Grinius, Jurgis Šaulys, Jonas Vileišis, Antanas Smetona, Stasys Matulaitis, Andrius Bulota, and others. They discussed political ideas and established the Lithuanian Democratic Party which later adopted a program along the ideas outlined in Credo that ultimately called for an independent Lithuania. Varpas financial situation continued to worsen and its most active contributors and editors moved abroad to study. Thus Višinskis became an informal editor of Varpas, contributing some 20 articles in the second half of 1903. He kept correspondence with the newspaper, based in East Prussia, via Mikuckaitė's sister who lived in Kybartai and could easily cross the Prussia–Russia border. At the same time he worked to raise funds for Žiburėlis, a charitable society providing financial aid to gifted Lithuanian students. Intense work took a toll on his frail health and he wanted to retire from Varpas, but stayed when no replacement could be found.

=== Press ban lifted ===
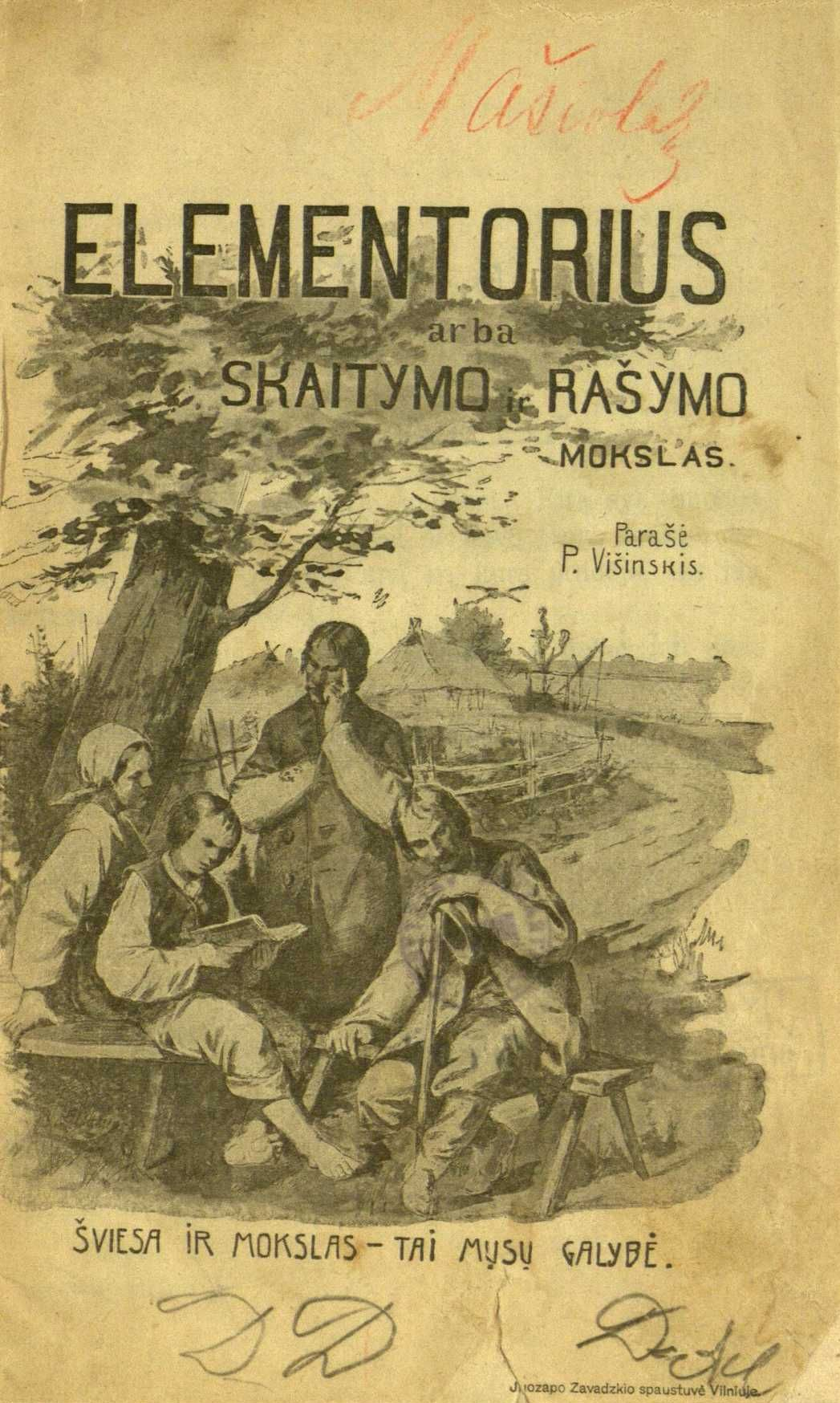
Cover page of the primer, first published in 1905

In spring 1901, the peace court in Žagarė fined Višinskis three rubles for posting the bilingual posters in Pašvitinys and Joniškis. It was a small fine, but he appealed the decision arguing that the Lithuanian press ban had no legal basis and that the censorship law did not apply to those posters. The court in Šiauliai asked the police to produce a copy of the 1866 law that outlawed any Lithuanian-language materials printed in Latin alphabet. The police had to admit that they did not have a copy. Regardless, in January 1903, the court upheld the guilty verdict and ordered Višinskis to pay the fine. He appealed the decision to the Governing Senate and was found not guilty on 13 May 1903. Despite the victory, Russian police continued to enforce the ban and confiscate Lithuanian press. Only the outbreak of the Russo-Japanese War in February 1904 forced the Russian government to relax restrictions placed on the minorities and the ban was officially lifted on 26 April 1904.

Lithuanian activists began organizing publication of Lithuanian books. Višinskis first wanted to publish a book for children by Žymantienė as a test to see if Russian censors would approve this "innocent" text. He also toyed with ideas to establish a periodical, a publishing company, or a bookstore. In May 1904, he and others organized a gathering in Kairiai to discuss the press, including the critical situation at Varpas, and the activities of the Lithuanian Democratic Party. Višinskis worked to find funding for Biliūnas literature and Pečkauskaitė's pedagogy studies at the University of Zurich, corresponded with Adomas Varnas about illustrations for literary works, explored possibilities of establishing an exposition of Lithuanian ethnographic material at the Polish National Museum in Kraków.

He received an invitation from Petras Vileišis to move to Vilnius and work as the editor of daily Vilniaus žinios. Before starting the new job, Višinskis traveled to Warsaw to visit editorial staff of Polish publications Ogniwo (to which he had contributed two articles and three correspondences), Kurier Codzienny, Gazeta Handlowa. The trip, once again, brought back the illness. The first issue of Vilniaus žinios was published on 10 December 1904. Višinskis used his literary contacts to obtain submissions to Vilniaus žinios, but Vileišis – more conservative and loyal to the Tsarist government – blocked the publication of more liberal pieces. In protest, Višinskis resigned on 2 January 1905. Writers were particularly dismayed by Vileišis' position that since he paid for the works he now owned the copyright. Višinskis intervened on behalf of Sofija Pšibiliauskienė to "buy back" her works. In April 1905, he wrote a lengthy article explaining his opposition to Vilniaus žinios, but it was not published because it was not approved by the state censors.

Višinskis remained in Vilnius and began organizing Šviesa, a publishing company aimed at publishing the works of Lithuanian writers. The company was established in February 1905. By late spring it had 20 shareholders that each contributed 50–100 rubles. The first published work was a book on Switzerland by Kazys Grinius. Other books included a work on Japan by Steponas Kairys, a translated work on Bulgaria, in addition to literary works by Lithuanian writers, including debut comedy of Jurgis Smolskis. At the same time, he wrote educational texts explaining basic concepts of a democracy (constitution, parliament, or universal suffrage). Using his teaching experience, he wrote an original primer to teach children to read. It was illustrated and featured excerpts from Lithuanian writers, samples of Lithuanian folklore, and omitted any Catholic prayers. It was very popular and was reprinted six times. It introduced the analytical–synthetic phonics method, developed in Russia by Konstantin Ushinsky and still used in schools today, instead of the old method of rote memorization of syllable by syllable (Lithuanian: slebizavimas). Višinkis published two other primers – an abbreviated version of the first primer and a version aimed at teaching to write. He wanted to publish many other works, but the work was slow – each publication needed to be approved by the state censors and then published at the Zawadzki press. Therefore, he continued to edit Varpas and publish stand-alone works in East Prussia. In Vilnius he collaborated with Felicija Bortkevičienė (both worked on Žiburėlis) and Jonas Jablonskis (he lived across the street), worked with Sofija Pšibiliauskienė to improve her writing. At Šviesa, he was assisted by Juozas Paršaitis.

=== Russian Revolution and death ===
He published various articles in Varpas on the Russian Revolution of 1905 – he called for the abolition of the Tsarist regime and did not support the State Duma, but did not go as far as to support the revolutionary socialism. He was delegated by the Lithuanian Democratic Party as a representative from the Vilna Governorate to the congress of zemstvos, organized by Pyotr Dmitriyevich Dolgorukov in October 1905. Two other Lithuanian delegates were Kazys Grinius and Vaclovas Bielskis. His main task was to raise the issue of Lithuania's autonomy within the Russian Empire, but the organizers refused to discuss the issue. He did not find support among Polish delegates and only managed to get some ideas published in Novoye Vremya. He returned further convinced that Tsarist promises, including the October Manifesto, cannot be trusted and that the revolution needed to go on. However, did not support an armed struggle and argued for passive resistance.

Višinskis was a member of the organizational committee of the Great Seimas of Vilnius, but resigned and was replaced by Jonas Vileišis when he disagreed with Jonas Basanavičius over the Seimas' agenda. Višinskis wanted to emphasize political and social issues, while Basanavičius was a lot more cautious and concentrated on cultural questions. At the Seimas, Višinskis delivered at least four longer speeches on Lithuania's autonomy and borders, on the congress of zemstvos in Moscow, on difficulties faced by Lithuanian schools, and other topics. He was also active in calming down raucous delegates and urging a compromise resolution.

After the Seimas, he became editor of Lietuvos ūkininkas, sponsored by the Lithuanian Democratic Party, but his strong support to the revolution attracted criticism and after the first two issues he was replaced by Antanas Smetona. Such internal disagreements led to the spin-off of the leftist Peasant Union. Višinskis continued to work on publishing various works, including his own pacifist brochure on war and a lengthy calendar for 1906. However, his health worsened and in February 1906 he was sent to Merano in the Alps for treatment. On his way, he stopped for a few days in Tilsit to deal with various issues publishing Lithuanian books and periodicals. Feeling ill, he disembarked in Berlin and found refuge with Veronika Janulaitytė, Biliūnas' sister-in-law who was studying medicine. He died on 23 April leaving his wife with a two-month-old daughter. His body was transported to Vilnius and he was buried at the Rasos Cemetery on 29 April.

== See also ==
Media related to Povilas Višinskis at Wikimedia Commons

== Bibliography ==
- Kryževičienė, Jolanta (6 June 2015). "Literatūrologė apie Žemaitę: galima suabejoti istorija apie 50-metę, staiga tapusią rašytoja" (in Lithuanian). 15min.
- Matulevičienė, Saulė (2011). "Iš fotografinių ekspedicijų istorijos: Isaakas Serbovas". Liaudies kultūra (in Lithuanian). 1 (136). ISSN 0236-0551.
- Miknys, Rimantas (1990). "P.Višinskis ir Lietuvos nepriklausomybės idėja". In Striogaitė, Dalia (ed.). Pirmieji Povilo Višinskio skaitymai (in Lithuanian). Šiauliai: Šiaulių P. Višinskio viešoji biblioteka.
- Motieka, Egidijus (1990). "P.Višinskis Didžiajame Vilniaus seime". In Striogaitė, Dalia (ed.). Pirmieji Povilo Višinskio skaitymai (in Lithuanian). Šiauliai: Šiaulių P. Višinskio viešoji biblioteka.
- Petrika, Antanas (1939). Lietuvių tautinio atbudimo pionieriai. Amerikos lietuvių darbininkų literatūros draugijos leidinys (in Lithuanian). Brooklyn: "Laisvės" Spauda. OCLC 976492346.
- Šaknis, P. (November 1894). "Iš Lietuvos. Saločiai". Ūkininkas (in Lithuanian). 11.
- Sprindis, Adolfas (1978). Povilas Višinskis (in Lithuanian). Vilnius: Vaga. OCLC 4874806.
- Striogaitė, Dalia (1990). "P.Višinskis - liaudies švietėjas, pedagogas". In Striogaitė, Dalia (ed.). Pirmieji Povilo Višinskio skaitymai (in Lithuanian). Šiauliai: Šiaulių P. Višinskio viešoji biblioteka.
- Striogaitė, Dalia (2015). "Povilo Višinskio laiškai, kurių nežinojome". Metai (in Lithuanian). 8/9. ISSN 0134-3211.
- Stryczyńska-Hodyl, Ewa (2008). "Povilas Višinskis - lenkų laikraščio OGNIWO bendradarbis". In Striogaitė, Dalia (ed.). Dešimtieji Povilo Višinskio skaitymai (in Lithuanian). Šiauliai: Šiaulių "Aušros" muziejus. ISBN 978-9986-766-47-6.
- Stukas, Jack J. (1966). Awakening Lithuania. The Florham Park Press. OCLC 476717530.
- Subačius, Liudas (2008). "Moters socialinio vaidmens kaitos atspindžiai Felicijos Bortkevičienės veikloje". Žurnalistikos tyrimai (in Lithuanian). 1: 154–172. doi:10.15388/zt/jr.2008.1.90. ISSN 2029-1132.
- Šveistytė, Alina; Apšegaitė, Violeta (31 August 2016). "Povilo Višinskio tyrimų reikšmė Lietuvos antropologijos mokslui". Mokslo Lietuva (in Lithuanian).
