= Darbininkų balsas (East Prussia) =

Lithuanian newspaper (1901–1906)

Darbininkų balsas (transl. The Voice of Workers) was a Lithuanian newspaper published by the Social Democratic Party of Lithuania from July 1901 to April 1906 (a total of 36 or 40 issues). It was the first more stable Lithuanian periodical of the party. The publication was illegal in the Russian Empire because of its political content and because it was in Lithuanian (the Lithuanian press ban was in effect from 1865 to 1904). Therefore, the newspaper was printed in East Prussia and smuggled into Lithuania. After the Russian Revolution of 1905, the newspaper was replaced by the legal Naujoji Gadynė published in Vilnius.

== History ==
The Social Democratic Party of Lithuania was established in 1896. It first attempted to publish a Lithuanian periodical when it published Lietuvos darbininkas (Lithuanian Worker) in May 1896. Two other issues were published only in 1898 and 1899. It was a translation from the Polish Robotnik Litewski. Another periodical Aidas Lietuvos darbininkų gyvenimo saw only two issues published in 1899 – the first issue was translated from the Polish Echo Życia Robotniczego by Kazys Grinius. The publication was discontinued after the arrests of party leaders, including Andrius Domaševičius, in early 1899.

The party reestablished its publications in 1901. The first issue of Darbininkų balsas was published in July 1901 in Tilsit (now Sovetsk, Kaliningrad Oblast). It was first printed at the printing shops of Julius Schoenke and Otto von Mauderode in Tilsit. In 1904, it was moved to the printing press of Martynas Jankus in Bitėnai. Bibliographer Domas Kaunas argued that the newspaper was printed by Jankus from the beginning except for a short break in 1904 when there were disagreements about costs. To confuse the police, the newspaper claimed that it was printed in Paris and London.

Only three issues of Darbininkų balsas were printed between July 1901 and May 1902 when Augustinas Janulaitis became editor-in-chief. The newspaper was then published regularly every two months and monthly starting in 1905. In 1904, the circulation of the newspaper reached 1,300.

The newspaper was funded by donations, contributions from the Social Democratic Party, and proceeds from the sale of social democratic publications. In 1905, many donations were received from Lithuanians in the United States, England, Scotland, Germany, Switzerland. Donations from the United States were sent by the Lithuanian Socialist Party of America (established in May 1905) which increased its membership fee by 5 cents specifically in support of Darbininkų balsas.

== Content ==
The newspaper reflected the ideology of the Social Democratic Party of Lithuania. It published news about party's activities, its publications. Many of its articles were written by its editor Janulaitis who lived abroad. Therefore, its connection to the worker movement in Lithuania was rather weak. It focused more on students and more educated farmers than workers. The newspaper focused on current political events and paid much less attention to theory and tactics. The newspaper supported Lithuanian national aspirations. For example, during the Russian Revolution of 1905, it argued that Lithuanians should focus more on the Lithuanian Great Seimas of Vilnius rather than the demands for the Russian Constituent Assembly. Still, the newspaper was the most radical Lithuanian publication at the time. Some of its articles were republished from Iskra published by the Russian Social Democratic Labour Party.

== Editors ==
The first issues were edited by Vladas Sirutavičius in Vilnius who then sent the material to Juozas Bagdonas (editor of Varpas) for publication without changes. However, an analysis of surviving drafts shows that the first issues were edited by Bagdonas and Vincas Kapsukas. The Social Democratic Party was dissatisfied with Bagdonas' editorial decisions (e.g. he did not want to publish political articles and was afraid that Darbininkų balsas would compete with Varpas) and, after three issues, replaced him with Augustinas Janulaitis who escaped from Lithuania to avoid the Tsarist police.

Janulaitis later moved to Scotland and Switzerland, but continued to edit Darbininkų balsas. In early 1904, Jonas Biliūnas assisted with the editorial process, but he had to resign due to poor health.

Vincas Kapsukas was dissatisfied that the newspaper spent little time on explaining ideas and theory of the labor movement and petitioned the party to intervene and replace Janulaitis. When the party refused to resolve the dispute, Kapsukas went on to publish short-lived Draugas in 1904. Kapsukas rejoined the main party, but remained personally at odds with Janulaitis.

Members of the party were dissatisfied that one person was in charge of the editorial process. Therefore, in June 1905, the party decided that the newspaper should be edited by a committee. Janulaitis protested the decision and resigned, but continued to edit the newspaper until the end of the year when Andrius Domaševičius became the editor.

At the same time, Liudas Vaineikis returned from exile in Yakutsk and moved to Tilsit. He took on many of the editorial duties and authored numerous articles. Vincas Kapsukas also assisted in editing the last issues of Darbininkų balsas in 1906.

== Contributors ==
Because the newspaper was illegal, articles were signed by various code names, initials, and were left unsigned. This makes it difficult to accurately determine the authors. Known newspaper's contributors included:

- Petras Avižonis
- Juozas Bagdonas
- Andrius Baltrušaitis
- Antanas Baltrušaitis
- Juozas Baltrušaitis
- Kipras Bielinis
- Jonas Biliūnas
- Mykolas Biržiška
- Ansas Bruožis
- Vanda Didžiulytė
- Jonas Grinius
- Augustinas Janulaitis
- Konstantinas Jasiukaitis
- Kleopas Jurgelionis
- Steponas Kairys
- Vincas Kapsukas
- Jonas Krikščiūnas (Jovaras)
- Lazdynų Pelėda
- Juozas Lozoraitis
- Stasys Matulaitis
- Vladas Mongirdas
- Alfonsas Moravskis
- Vladas Požela
- Vladas Putvinskis
- Jeronimas Ralys
- Antanas Rucevičius
- Jurgis Šaulys
- Jonas Šepetys
- Domas Šidlauskas-Visuomis
- Motiejus Simonaitis
- Vladas Sirutavičius
- Kostas Stiklius
- Liudas Vaineikis
- Jonas Vanagaitis
- Kazimieras Venclauskis
- Jonas Vileišis
- Povilas Višinskis
- Žemaitė

== See also ==
- List of Lithuanian-language periodicals (up to 1904)

== Bibliography ==
- Bitautas, Algis; Tamošaitis, Mindaugas (2016). "Janulaitis Augustinas" (PDF). In Tamošaitis, Mindaugas; Bitautas, Algis; Svarauskas, Artūras (eds.). Lietuvos Respublikos 1918–1940 m. vyriausybių ministrų biografinis žodynas (in Lithuanian). Vilnius: Mokslo ir enciklopedijų leidybos centras. pp. 200–203. ISBN 978-5-420-01778-4.
- Kaunas, Domas (1987). "M. Jankaus leidybinė veikla Bitėnuose (1892–1909 m.)". Knygotyra (in Lithuanian). 10 (17).
- Petreikis, Tomas (2021). "Socialdemokratinių organizacijų pogrindinė spauda Šiauliuose 1904-1914 metais". Knygotyra. 77: 236–276. ISSN 0204-2061.
- Sabaliūnas, Leonas (1990). Lithuanian Social Democracy in Perspective, 1893-1914. Duke University Press. ISBN 9780822310150.
- Tapinas, Laimonas; et al., eds. (1997). Žurnalistikos enciklopedija (PDF) (in Lithuanian). Vilnius: Pradai. p. 518. ISBN 9986-776-62-7.
- Vidmantas, Edvardas (1979). Lietuvos darbininkų periodinė spauda, 1895–1917 (in Lithuanian). Mintis. OCLC 6195352.
