= Jonas Krikščiūnas =

Lithuanian poet

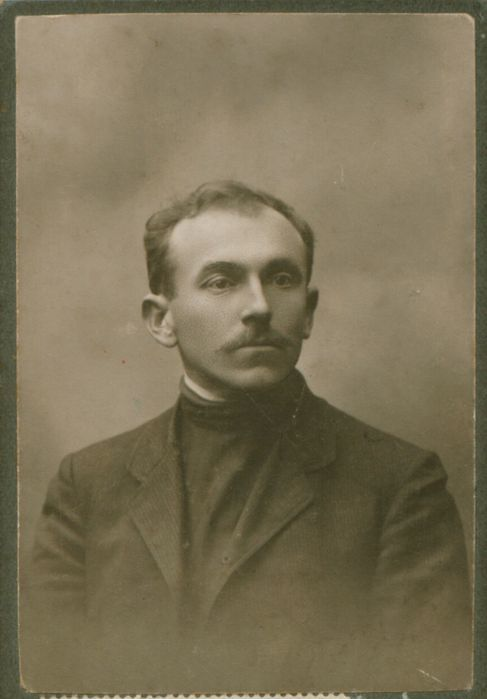
- Krikščiūnas in 1905
- Born: 13 January 1880; Kalniškiai, Kovno Governorate, Russian Empire
- Died: 21 January 1967 (aged 87); Šiauliai, Lithuanian SSR
- Other name: Jovaras
- Occupation: Poet
- Awards: People's Poet of the Lithuanian SSR (1960)

Jonas Krikščiūnas, known by his pen name Jovaras (Note: Jovaras is a Lithuanian name of several species of trees and shrubs: black poplar, sycamore maple, common hornbeam, hawthorn, and plane tree. Source: "Jõvaras". Lietuvių kalbos žodynas (in Lithuanian). Lietuvių kalbos institutas. 2018-01-01. ISBN 978-9986-668-98-5.) (13 January [O.S. 1 January] 1880 – 21 January 1967), was a Lithuanian poet. From around 1896 to 1904, he was a book smuggler helping distribute the banned Lithuanian books. A son of poor peasants, he never received any formal education. He learned to read at home and with financial support from Žiburėlis studied privately in 1907–1910. In 1901, he met with Povilas Višinskis who taught him the basics of poetry. Krikščiūnas wrote most of his works in 1904–1910. Eight different poetry collections were published before World War I. His poetry built on the traditions of the Lithuanian folk songs. Two of his best known poems were adapted into folk songs. During the Russian Revolution of 1905, his works reflected struggles and suffering of the common people and socialist ideology. His later poems repeated socialist–communist slogans.

== Biography ==
=== Early life ===
Krikščiūnas was born in the village of Kalniškiai near Šiauliai, Kovno Governorate, Russian Empire, to a family of poor Lithuanian farmers. The family owned three dessiatins – about 3.3 hectares (8.2 acres) – of land and raised four children. Krikščiūnas did not attend school, but was educated at home. He showed great interest in books and even began teaching other children to read. He contracted trachoma, an infectious eye disease, and later lost eyesight in one of his eyes. He worked as a herder and began experimenting with short stories and songs based on the Lithuanian folk traditions. In 1897, he sent his first song to Tėvynės sargas. While it was not published, he received a letter from its editor Juozas Tumas-Vaižgantas encouraging him to continue writing.

From around 1896 to 1904, Krikščiūnas was a book smuggler helping distribute the banned Lithuanian books in Pakruojis, Rozalimas, Lygumai, Pašvitinys, Linkuva, Žeimelis, and elsewhere. In 1899, while carrying the books, he was shot in the back by a Russian policeman. He had to borrow about 100 rubles for treatment, but recovered and continued book smuggling.

=== First publications ===
His first submission to Tėvynės sargas, a correspondence, was printed in 1901. Via Augustinas Janulaitis, Krikščiūnas was introduced to the intelligentsia of Šiauliai area – Žemaitė, Gabrielė Petkevičaitė-Bitė, Sofija Pšibiliauskienė (Lazdynų Pelėda), Vladas Putvinskis, Povilas Višinskis. Višinskis, mentor of literary talent, noticed Krikščiūnas' interest in literature and taught him the basics, including rhyme, of poetry. He wrote his first poems in 1902 and they were well received. With Višinskis help, his poems were published in Varpas, Ūkininkas, Naujienos as well as Lithuanian periodicals published in United States, including Vienybė lietuvninkų. In total, his poetry was published in more than 25 Lithuanian periodicals.

Since the publications were illegal, he signed by many different pen names, including Gaivalas (uncontrollable force of nature, tempest), Laukinis (wild), Surūdijusi Plunksna (rusty feather), Vėjobrolis (wind brother), but Jovaras (hawthorn) became most popular. As Krikščiūnas explained, he chose this pen name, which later he used as part of his last name, because hawthorn is a hardy, small, not particularly attractive tree – just like himself, a man of a village.

=== Activist in Šiauliai ===
After the Lithuanian press ban was lifted in 1904, Krikščiūnas began selling various calendars, books, and periodicals legally in Šiauliai. During the Russian Revolution of 1905, he organized a makeshift printing press at his home and printed various anti-Tsarist proclamations for the Social Democratic Party of Lithuania. In 1906, the first collection of his poetry was published in a separate 16-page booklet. It was edited by Višinskis and printed by the Zawadzki Press. In 1907–1910, Krikščiūnas was an informal student. He first visited Lithuanian students in Saint Petersburg and then, receiving a monthly stipend from Žiburėlis, privately studied in Šiauliai, assisted by the students of the Šiauliai Gymnasium. In 1908, he became acquainted with Julius Janonis, another young Lithuanian poet, and they used to discuss literary matters. In 1909 and 1912, Varpas Society organized two Krikščiūnas' poetry evenings in Šiauliai.

=== Later life ===
When the stipend of Žiburėlis ceased, he moved back to his native Kalniškiai and lived off his farm. He had a large private collection of various Lithuanian books and periodicals and his home acted as a village library. Writer Juozas Grušas credited Krikščiūnas and this library for inspiring him.

Krikščiūnas retired from the farm and moved to Šiauliai in 1945. As a member of the Union of Soviet Writers, he received a government pension. He reconstructed a war-damaged two-storey brick house. The first floor was taken by Dapšiai family, while he lived on the second floor. He was elected to the Šiauliai city council. He joined the Communist Party of the Soviet Union in 1949 and was declared People's Poet of the Lithuanian SSR in 1960.

== Personal life ==
Krikščiūnas was married three times. He first married in 1911 and had two children, but divorced in 1922. His first wife and daughter emigrated to Argentina. He married again in 1925. His second wife Ona Rakauskaitė was twenty years his junior, but died of tuberculosis in 1947. They had four children. Krikščiūnas remarried again in 1950. After his widow's death in 1980, Krikščiūnas' house in Šiauliai was converted into a memorial museum in 1986.

== Poetry ==
Krikščiūnas wrote most of his works in 1904–1910. His poetry often features complaints and lamentations about life's struggles and suffering and scenes of nature. His verse is simple, accessible to the common folk. The poems are similar to Lithuanian folk songs and two of them, Ko liūdi, berželi? (Why so Sad, Birch Tree?) and Tylus, tylus vakarėlis (Quiet Quiet Evening), were adapted into folk songs. During and after the Russian Revolution of 1905, his poetry reflected social democratic political ideas and slogans. In later years, he reworked his earlier poems or created new poems that repeated socialist–communist slogans. He was one of the first Lithuanian poets to write in free verse. He also wrote 23 sonnets. His poetry was influenced by folk traditions and by Maironis. In turn, he influenced Julius Janonis and Kazys Binkis.

Eight separate collections of his poetry were published before World War I. Žibutė arba Pirmieji pavasario žiedai (Liverleaf or the First Blooms of Spring), the first collection of Krikščiūnas' poetry, was published in Vilnius in 1906. Three more collections followed in 1908. Isakas Brevda published Poezija (Poetry) and Jausmų kibirkštėlės (Sparks of Feelings) at the combined circulation of 25,000 copies in Šiauliai. They were the first Lithuanian-language publications in Šiauliai after the Lithuanian press ban was lifted in 1904. Otto von Mauderode in Tilsit published Širdies balsai (Voices of the Heart). The Society of Saint Casimir published Jubiliejinė knygelė (Jubilee Book) in Kaunas in 1912. Another collection Sielos aidas. Eilės (Echo of the Soul. Poetry) was published in Vilnius in 1913 (circulation of 10,000 copies). Two poetry collections were published by Lithuanian Americans: Pirmieji žiedai (First Blooms) in Chicago in 1909 and Amžinos dainos (Forever Songs) in Boston in 1914.

During the interwar years, Krikščiūnas published only one collection of poetry in 1923. It included only a few new poems. His poems were printed on greeting cards and in advertisements of confectionery. More collections were published in Soviet Lithuania: in 1947 (second corrected edition in 1952), 1955 (included post-war works), 1956 (included works by Butkų Juzė), 1961, 1980. In 1995, Bronius Prėskienis published a biography of Krikščiūnas.

In addition to poetry, he published a collection of short stories Tėvynės laukuose (In the Fields of the Homeland) in Pittsburgh in 1909. Krikščiūnas also collected and recorded folk tales, legends, riddles, proverbs, and other examples of folk culture. Riddles and proverbs collected by him were published in Aušrinė in 1911. He sent collected folk tales to Jonas Basanavičius who published nine of them in 1928. Krikščiūnas sent 16 texts to the Lithuanian Scientific Society in 1914.
