= Ivanauskas =

- Lithuanian surname
- m.: Ivanauskas
- f.: (unmarried): Ivanauskaitė
- f.: (married): Ivanauskienė

Ivanauskas is a Lithuanian-language surname, Lithuanized from the Slavic patronymic counterparts: Polish Iwanowski, Russian Ivanovsky/Ivanovskiy (Ивановский), and Belarusian Ivanoŭski (Іваноўскі).

Notable people with the surname include:

- Brigita Ivanauskaitė (born 1993), Lithuanian handballer
- Jonas Ivanauskas (born 1960), Lithuanian priest
- Jurga Ivanauskaitė (1961–2007), Lithuanian writer
- Rapolas Ivanauskas (born 1998) is a Lithuanian basketball player
- Tadas Ivanauskas (1882–1970), Lithuanian zoologist and biologist
- Valdas Ivanauskas (born 1966, Lithuanian football (soccer) player and coach
- Sofija Ivanauskaitė (1867–1926), birth name of Sofija Pšibiliauskienė, Lithuanian writer
- Marija Ivanauskaitė (1872–1957), birth name of Marija Lastauskienė, Lithuanian writer
