= Naujienos (apolitical newspaper) =

Lithuanian-language monthly newspaper

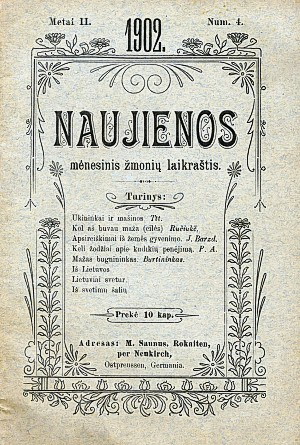
Cover page of the 4th issue of Naujienos in 1902

Naujienos (literally: News) was a short-lived Lithuanian-language monthly newspaper published by editorial staff of Varpas and Ūkininkas. Due to the Lithuanian press ban in the Russian Empire, the newspaper was published in Tilsit (now Sovetsk) in East Prussia and then smuggled to Lithuania by knygnešiai. In 1903, its circulation was around 1,500.

The newspaper, edited by Juozas Bagdonas, was largely apolitical, concentrating on general news, cultural and popular science topics. Naujienos was geared towards the masses. It published literary works by such authors as Jonas Biliūnas, Žemaitė, Lazdynų Pelėda.
