= Stasys Matulaitis =

Lithuanian political activist (1866–1956)

- Born: 24 October 1866; Stebuliškės, Suwałki Governorate, Congress Poland
- Died: 10 April 1956 (aged 89); Vilnius, Lithuanian SSR
- Education: Marijampolė Gymnasium; Imperial Moscow University
- Occupations: Physician, newspaper editor, party activist, historian
- Political party: Social Democratic Party of Lithuania; Communist Party of Lithuania
- Board member of: Lithuanian Scientific Society
- Children: Katrė Matulaitytė
- Relatives: Brother Juozas Matulaitis
- Awards: Order of the Red Banner of Labor

Stasys Matulaitis (24 October 1866 – 10 April 1956) was an activist of the Lithuanian National Revival who became one of the leaders of the Social Democratic Party of Lithuania. He later joined the Communist Party of Lithuania and became a historian.

Educated as a physician at the Imperial Moscow University, Matulaitis joined Lithuanian public life from an early age. He contributed short correspondences to Aušra and increasingly became involved with the publication and editing of Varpas and Ūkininkas (he was their editor-in-chief from 1895 to 1897). At the same time, he wrote and published fiction, popular science works, and brochures on history and socialism. In total, from 1893 to 1935, he published about 30 original and 17 translated works. Due to his involvement with the smuggling of illegal Lithuanian publications, he was exiled to the Astrakhan Oblast and the Komi Republic for three years. After serving in the Russo-Japanese War as a medical doctor, Matulaitis lived in Vilnius where he edited newspapers of the Social Democratic Party of Lithuania and was active in various Lithuanian societies, including the Lithuanian Scientific Society.

During World War I, Matulaitis was once again drafted to serve as a military doctor. In 1918, he joined the Central Bureau of the Lithuanian Sections of the Russian Communist Party (Bolsheviks) and became co-editor of the communist periodical Tiesa. Upon return to Lithuania, he joined the Communist Party of Lithuania which was outlawed in interwar Lithuania. He was arrested by the Lithuanian police in 1925 and escaped to the Soviet Union. In 1927, he joined the Institute of Belarusian Culture (reorganized into the Belarusian Academy of Sciences) and devoted his time to researching the history of Lithuania. He was awarded doctorate in 1934 for a study of economic causes of the Uprising of 1863. He was imprisoned by the NKVD during the Great Purge. After two years in prison, he was exiled to Kazakhstan.

Matulaitis returned to Lithuania in 1946 and joined the Lithuanian Institute of History and taught history at Vilnius University. However, he could not accept the party-imposed version of history and publicly criticized Juozas Žiugžda in 1950. As a result, Matulaitis was dismissed from his posts and spent the last years of his life in poverty and obscurity writing texts openly critical of the Soviet regime that remain unpublished.

== Biography ==
=== Education ===
Matulaitis was born on 24 October 1866 in Stebuliškės in Suvalkija (then part of Congress Poland). His parents were peasants. His younger brother Juozas Matulaitis became a pharmacist and also active in Lithuanian public life.

He attended a primary school in Liudvinavas. Already as a student at the Marijampolė Gymnasium, influenced by his teacher Petras Kriaučiūnas and classmate Jonas Mačys-Kėkštas, he joined the Lithuanian National Revival. He contributed short correspondences to Aušra and distributed the illegal Lithuanian press. He graduated in 1886 and continued his studies at the Imperial Moscow University. He graduated in 1891 with a medical degree. He returned to Lithuania and attempted to establish himself as a physician in Aleksotas (1891), Jieznas (1892–1893), Balbieriškis (1893–1895), Vilkaviškis (1895), Pilviškiai (1895–1898).

=== Lithuanian National Revival ===
==== Newspaper editor ====
As a university student, he began writing articles for Varpas. When he returned to Lithuania, he became increasingly involved with the editing and publishing of Varpas and Ūkininkas. Matulaitis wrote sharp leftist articles which were disliked by the more conservative authors and editors. Nevertheless, he became chief editor of both periodicals in 1895 and continued to do so until 1897. Under Matulaitis, the newspapers became more radical, criticizing both the Tsarist regime and the Catholic clergy.

He not only edited the newspapers for free (the previous editor Jonas Kriaučiūnas was paid 50 Russian rubles per month), but also donated sizeable sums for their publication (some 950 rubles according to Kazys Grinius). Matulaitis faced substantial difficulties editing the newspapers as they were published in Tilsit in East Prussia and materials had to be continuously smuggled across the Russia–Prussia border. Matulaitis also supported smuggling of illegal Lithuanian publications and, in particular, the Sietynas Society.

==== Author ====
During this time, Matulaitis tried his had at fiction writing. He published two poems (1891–1892), two short stories (1893–1894), and two fairytales (1896). He published three anti-religious satires in 1897, 1900, and 1904 as separate booklets. These realist works, considered to be of low artistic value by modern literary historians, reflected Matulaitis' political views and served a public function – a call for action for a better future. In addition, he published about twenty articles with literary criticism of the Lithuanian literature. Similarly, in his literary criticism, Matulaitis rejected aesthetics and demanded that the literature serve a public function. He also criticized Maironis, Šatrijos Ragana, and others for writing works full of religious imagery and ideas. Matulaitis also translated works to Lithuanian. Most notable of these was the novel Spartaco by Raffaello Giovagnoli (1904).

Influenced by positivism, Matulaitis published several translated works on popular science, including chemistry and geology textbooks. Publishing such educational texts was common among Lithuanian activists of the period. He also became interested in history. He published booklets on serfdom based on works by Kazimierz Kelles-Krauz in 1899, on the French Revolution based on François Mignet and Wilhelm Blos in 1901, and on the classical antiquity based on Robert Wipper in 1904. He published two original works on the history of Lithuania: about the Kražiai massacre in 1895 and Lithuanians under the Tsars in 1897.

==== Political activist ====
Matulaitis was also active politically. As a student in Moscow, he became interested in socialism. He wrote a popular brochure Kas yra, o kas bus (What Is, and What Will Be) in 1891 and had it published in 1895 and 1904. He translated works on labor and capital by Boris Svidersky (published in 1896), political economy by Carl August Schramm (published in 1900), and election pamphlet The Spider and the Fly by Karl Liebknecht (published in 1903 and 1905).

Matulaitis frequently visited Vilnius and maintained contacts with socialist activists Andrius Domaševičius and Alfonsas Moravskis. They, together with other leftist contributors to Varpas, Kazys Grinius and Juozas Bagdonas, decided to establish the Social Democratic Party of Lithuania in 1895. It became the first Lithuanian political party. Matulaitis helped the party to organize its first periodical publications.

=== Internal exile and military service ===
The Tsarist police investigated Sietynas Society (it led to the trial of 34 Lithuanian book smugglers). Matulaitis' apartment was searched in August 1897, but the police found nothing. He was not arrested due to lack of evidence, but was accused of "political disloyalty" and ordered to relocate to the interior of Russia in June 1898. He spent three years in Sasykoli (Astrakhan Oblast) and Ust-Sysolsk (now Syktyvkar in the Komi Republic) working as a physician.

After short medical courses in Saint Petersburg, Matulaitis returned to Pilviškiai in January 1902. There, his position of town's doctor was taken by Kazys Grinius, a close colleague since the publishing of Varpas. After a conflict and a mediation, Grinius moved out so that Matulaitis could resume his medical practice.

Despite continued police surveillance, Matulaitis resumed his public activities: organizing local sections of the Social Democratic Party of Lithuania, contributing articles to social democratic press (including to Darbininkų balsas, writing for Varpas and Ūkininkas. However, such activities were interrupted by the outbreak of the Russo-Japanese War in February 1904. Matulaitis was drafted to serve as military doctor and was sent to Manchuria.

=== Activist in Vilnius ===
After serving in the Russo-Japanese War, Matulaitis returned to Lithuania in fall 1905. He briefly worked as a physician in Kalvarija. In April 1906, Vladas Požela, one of the leaders of the Social Democratic Party, convinced Matulaitis to move to Vilnius, abandon well-paid medical work, and take up much less lucrative party work. In Vilnius, he edited party's first legal newspaper Naujoji Gadynė. However, the newspaper continued to run into Tsarist censors (out of 32 issues, 11 were confiscated) and was eventually closed. It was replaced by the short-lived Skardas. After it was discontinued in June 1907, Matulaitis worked at the editorial staff of Vilniaus žinios until 1909.

Around that time, two main fractions developed with the Social Democratic Party of Lithuania: federalists and autonomists. The autonomists wanted to cooperate with the Russian Social Democratic Labour Party against the common enemy of monarchy and capitalism, while federalists (among them Matulevičius) wanted to stay clear of both Russian and Polish influences. At the same time, disappointed with the failure of the Russian Revolution of 1905, Matulaitis spent less time on politics, returned to medicine, and engaged in other public work.

Matulaitis was active in various societies. In 1906, he became chairman of Šviesa publishing company established by Povilas Višinskis. The company was active until 1913 and published about 20 Lithuanian books. Together with others, he founded a charitable society to support impoverished children. Matulaits was one of the co-founders of the Lithuanian Scientific Society and was elected as vice-chairman of its first board in April 1907. He also delivered various popular lectures on medicine, history, etc. He worked on a Marxist history of Lithuania. Due to war, it was first published in Voronezh in 1918 and republished in Kaunas in 1923. In this history, Matulaitis focused less on the Grand Dukes of Lithuania and more social and economic developments.

=== World War I ===
At the outbreak of World War I in July 1914, Matulaitis was once again drafted to serve as a military doctor, first in Vilnius and then in Moscow. He continued to be involved with the Lithuanian social democrats and was one of their leaders in Moscow. Political activity intensified after the February Revolution. In May 1917, Lithuanian social democrats voted to join the Russian Social Democratic Labour Party (Bolsheviks) (RSDLP(b)). However, Matulaitis, Petras Avižonis, Jurgis Smolskis, and others wanted to keep the name of Lithuanian social democrats for which they were harshly criticized by Zigmas Angarietis and Vincas Mickevičius-Kapsukas (based in Petrograd) who had fully embraced Russian Bolsheviks and joined the Lithuanian Sections of RSDLP(b).

In June 1917, Matulaitis participated in Petrograd Seimas which debated Lithuania's future after the war. At the Seimas, he opposed the resolution calling for full independence for Lithuania and supported the resolution which left the issue open. In late 1917, Matulaitis as well as several other Lithuanians, were elected to district dumas of the Moscow City Duma. At the same time, Matulaitis published and edited Socialdemokratas. This newspaper clashed with Tiesa published by Agarietis and Kapsukas regarding the relationship with RSDLP(b). In the end, Matulaitis could not sustain his more independent position and joined Angarietis and Kapsukas. He was elected to the Central Bureau of the Lithuanian Sections of RSDLP(b) in January 1918 and became co-editor of Tiesa in April 1918. Nevertheless, in later Soviet historiography, Matulaitis was not considered a "true Bolshevik", was harshly criticized for ideological mistakes, and serious deviations from the general line of the party.

=== Interwar Lithuania ===
Matulaitis returned to Lithuania and lived in Vilnius in 1918. He became a member of the Central Committee of the Communist Party of Lithuania and Byelorussia, but did not join the institutions of the Lithuanian Soviet Socialist Republic proclaimed at that start of the Lithuanian–Soviet War in December 1918. He worked at a Red Cross Hospital, briefly edited Tiesa, and worked at a Soviet printing shop.

After Vilnius was captured by Poland in April 1919, Matulaitis was briefly arrested in June 1919. In fall 1919, he moved to Lithuania and worked as a doctor in Vilkaviškis. He quickly became director of the local hospital and was elected to the city's council in 1921. He continued to be actively involved with the Communist Party of Lithuania which was outlawed in interwar Lithuania. In 1921, he was listed as the chairman of cooperative book publishing company Šviesa (the actual chairman was his son-in-law and communist leader Karolis Požela). The company was shut down by the Lithuanian police and Matulaitis faced as many as six criminal cases for publishing communist literature.

In 1923, Matulaitis moved to Marijampolė where he worked as a doctor and history teacher at the Realgymnasium. He continued to be active in public life – worked with a local workers' union, delivered lectures, was a member of the city's council. He was arrested on 13 February 1925 and accused of organizing a communist revolt – Matulaitis claimed that the police planted explosives that were found in his possession. He was released on bail in May 1925. Fearing prison sentence, he decided to escape the Soviet Union. He traveled to Riga where the Soviet consulate obtained him a Latvian passport under a fake name.

=== Soviet Belarus ===
In Russia, he lectured on the history of Lithuania at the Communist University of the National Minorities of the West and worked as a physician, first in Moscow then in Leningrad. In 1927, Matulaitis moved to Minsk to work as the head of the Lithuanian history department of the Institute of Belarusian Culture (reorganized into the Belarusian Academy of Sciences).

At the institute, Matulaitis researched the history of Lithuania and published two books: Religija ir jos socialinė reikšmė (Religion and Its Social Significance) in 1931 and 1863 m. Lietuvoje I. Socialinis-ekonominis Lietuvos stovis prieš sukilimą (1863 in Lithuania. Social–Economic Situation in Lithuania before the Uprising) in 1934. For this work he received doctorate in history and was elected a true member of the Academy of Sciences. He wrote several other works that remained unpublished, including a further study on the Uprising of 1863, studies on merchant trade, Reformation in Lithuania, Lithuanian villages in Belarus, class struggle during the Lithuanian National Revival.

At the same time, he published popular science brochures and was one of the editors of Lithuanian-language newspaper Raudonasis artojas. In the newspaper, Matulaitis published articles critical of the Lithuanian communist leaders in Moscow, Zigmas Angarietis and Vincas Kapsukas. Kapsukas, in turn, accused Matulaitis of still harboring petty bourgeois ideals, of not being a true Bolshevik, and of making ideological errors.

During the Great Purge, Matulaitis was expelled from the Communist Party in August 1937 and arrested by the NKVD in December 1937. He was accused of espionage and spent two years in prison. In August 1939, he was sentenced to five years of exile. He was exiled to Kashyr in Pavlodar Region, Kazakhstan where he worked in an ambulatory clinic until December 1945.

=== Soviet Lithuania ===
Matulaitis returned to Lithuania in December 1946. He was already 80 years old and received a special state pension for merits to communist causes, but he continued to be involved with public life. He joined the Lithuanian Institute of History (part of the Lithuanian Academy of Sciences) and wrote studies on the Russian Revolution of 1905, Lithuanian Social Democracy, Lithuanian revolutionary movement, etc. but they remained unpublished. He also worked on the new Marxist Lithuanian history textbook (chapters covering the period of 1812–1905). In fall 1948, he started lecturing history at Vilnius University.

On 10 November 1950, during a session at the Academy of Sciences, Matulaitis publicly criticized Juozas Žiugžda and his brochure on the historical friendship between Russia and Lithuania. Žiugžda was the key historian who undertook to rewrite the history of Lithuania according to the principles of Marxist historiography and enforce such principles on other historians. Matulaitis called out Žiugžda for making many mistakes, for portraying Lithuanians as a moribund nation that achieved nothing by itself and everything that it did create was only thanks to the Russians. For this, Matulaitis was universally attacked by other Soviet historians who criticized him for nationalist and reactionary ideas. He was dismissed from the Institute of History on 1 December 1950. In his diary, Matulaitis agreed that he was unfit to work at the institute because he could not falsify history as required by party officials.

Removed from public life, Matulaitis lived in obscurity in Žvėrynas. He wrote his memoir, the history of the Social Democratic Party of Lithuania, and other texts which were openly critical of Stalin, Vincas Kapsukas, and communist regime in general. He referred to the communist regime as tyranny and slavery. He continued to consider himself a Marxist, but did not hide his disappointment in Bolshevism. These texts have not been published. He struggled financially (he received 660 ruble pension).

In March 1956, Matulaitis was awarded the Order of the Red Banner of Labor for participating in the Russian Revolution of 1905. He died on 10 April 1956 in Vilnius. He was posthumously rehabilitated by the Supreme Court of the Lithuanian SSR on 20 May 1957. The same year, his memoir was published which focused on the period of the Lithuanian press ban.

== Personal life ==
In 1897, just before his three-year internal exile, Matulaitis married Vilhelmina Mackevičiūtė. She was of Polish origin, but supportive to the Lithuanian causes. She was aunt of writers Józef Mackiewicz and Stanisław Mackiewicz, and women's activist Vincenta Matulaitytė-Lozoraitienė.

Matulaitis and Mackevičiūtė had four children (three daughters and a son), but their marriage was difficult. One of his daughters, Katrė Matulaitytė (1900–1938) was an active communist. She was married to prominent communists Roman Pilar and Karolis Požela.

== Bibliography ==
- Burneikienė, Genovaitė (1997). "Naujoji Gadynė" (PDF). In Tapinas, Laimonas; et al. (eds.). Žurnalistikos enciklopedija. Vilnius: Pradai. ISBN 9986-776-62-7.
- Girdzijauskas, Juozas, ed. (2001). Lietuvių literatūros istorija: XIX amžius (in Lithuanian). Vilnius: Lietuvių literatūros ir tautosakos institutas. ISBN 9986513693.
- Malinauskas, Jonas (2007). "Juozapas Mackevičius (Józef Mackiewicz) – vilnietis, nemėgęs XX amžiaus" (PDF). Naujasis Židinys - Aidai (in Lithuanian). 8–9: 368–377. ISSN 1392-6845.
- Merkys, Vytautas (1994). Knygnešių laikai 1864–1904 (in Lithuanian). Vilnius: Valstybinis leidybos centras. ISBN 9986-09-018-0.
- Merkys, Vytautas (2009). Atminties prošvaistės (in Lithuanian). Versus aureus. ISBN 978-9955-34-219-9.
- Miraza, R. (20 April 1956). "Krislai" (PDF). Laisvė (in Lithuanian). Vol. 77.
- Mitrulevičius, Gintaras; Trimakas, Ramūnas (2016). ""Tamista esi nerealus žmogus": keletas štrichų kairiojo inteligento ir istoriko Stasio Matulaičio portretui" (PDF). Istorija (in Lithuanian). 3 (103): 51–106. ISSN 1392-0456.
- Sabaliūnas, Leonas (1990). Lithuanian Social Democracy in Perspective, 1893-1914. Duke University Press. ISBN 9780822310150.
- Šarmaitis, Romas, ed. (1971). Lietuvos Komunistų partijos istorijos apybraiža (in Lithuanian). Vol. I. Vilnius: Mintis.
- Seselskytė, Adelė (2006). "Lietuvių mokslo draugijai – 100 metų" (PDF). Tautosakos darbai (in Lithuanian). XXXII. ISSN 1392-2831.
- Vidmantas, Edvardas (1979). Lietuvos darbininkų periodinė spauda, 1895–1917 (in Lithuanian). Mintis. OCLC 6195352.
- "Stasys Matulaitis". Visuotinė lietuvių enciklopedija (in Lithuanian). Mokslo ir enciklopedijų leidybos centras. 15 November 2022 [2018].
- Матулайтис Станислав Юрьевич. Имя в белорусской науке (in Russian). Yakub Kolas Central Scientific Library.
- Zinkus, Jonas (1959). "Knyga apie draugystę, gimusią sunkiais priespaudos metais". Katorga. By Kozlov, Ivan (in Lithuanian). Vilnius: Valstybinė grožinės literatūros leidykla.
