= Kurtuvėnai Manor =

Manor in Kurtuvėnai, Lithuania

Coordinates: 55°49′32″N 23°2′56″E

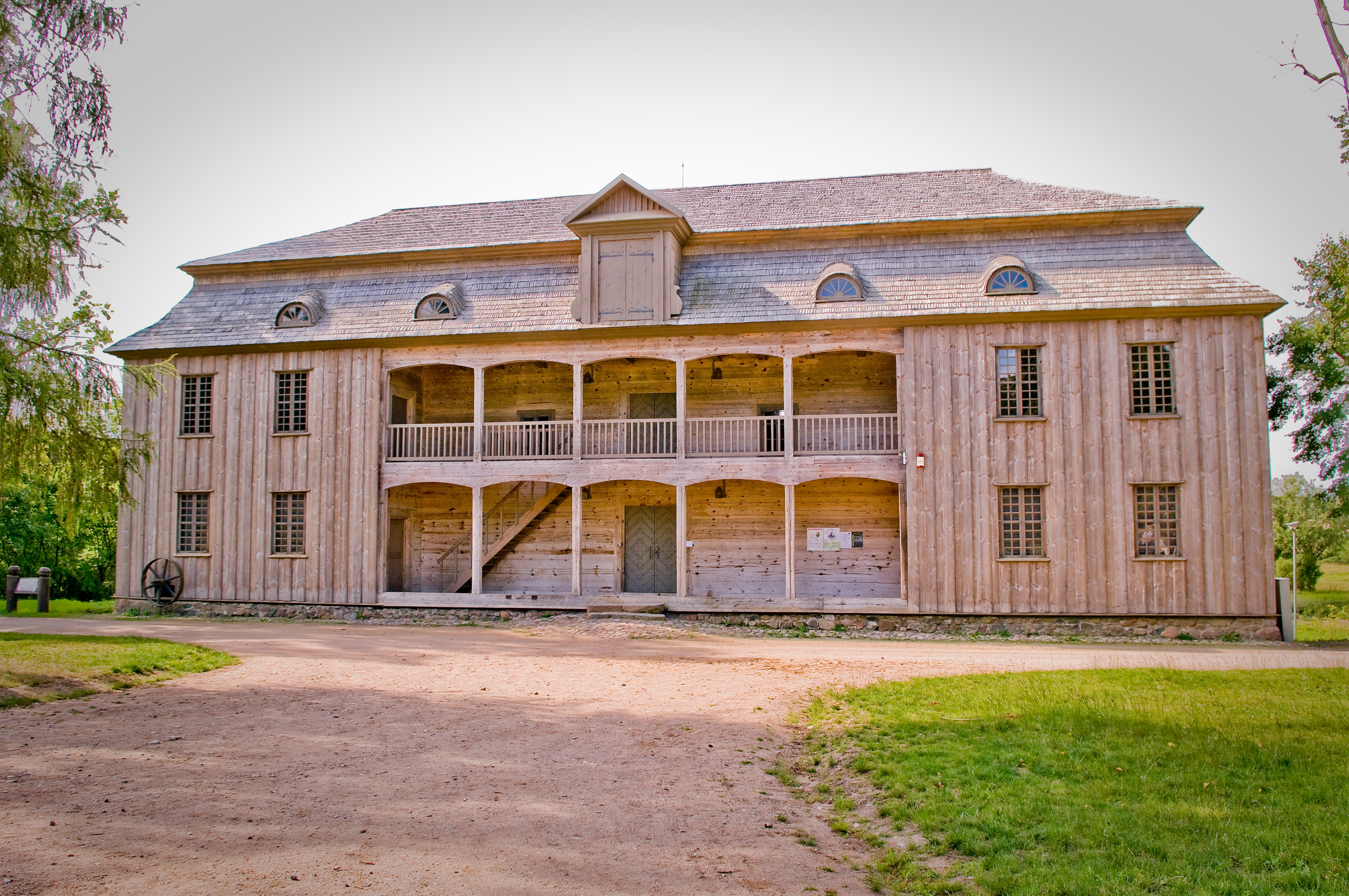
Kurtuvėnai Manor barn

Kurtuvėnai Manor was a residential manor in Kurtuvėnai, Lithuania. Kurtuvėnai Manor barn is built with unique project without using any nails.

== Gallery ==
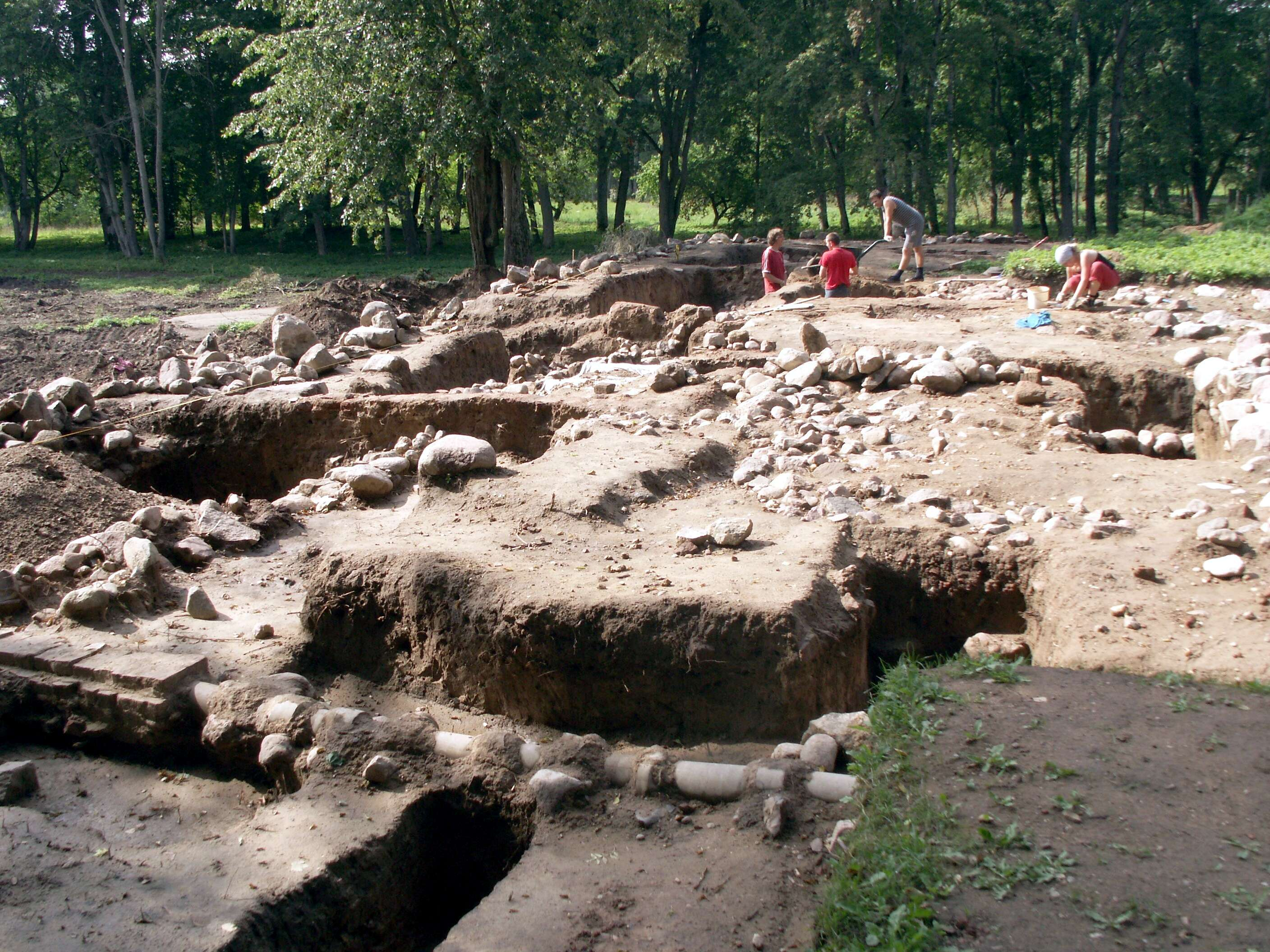
Kurtuvėnai Manor archaeological research

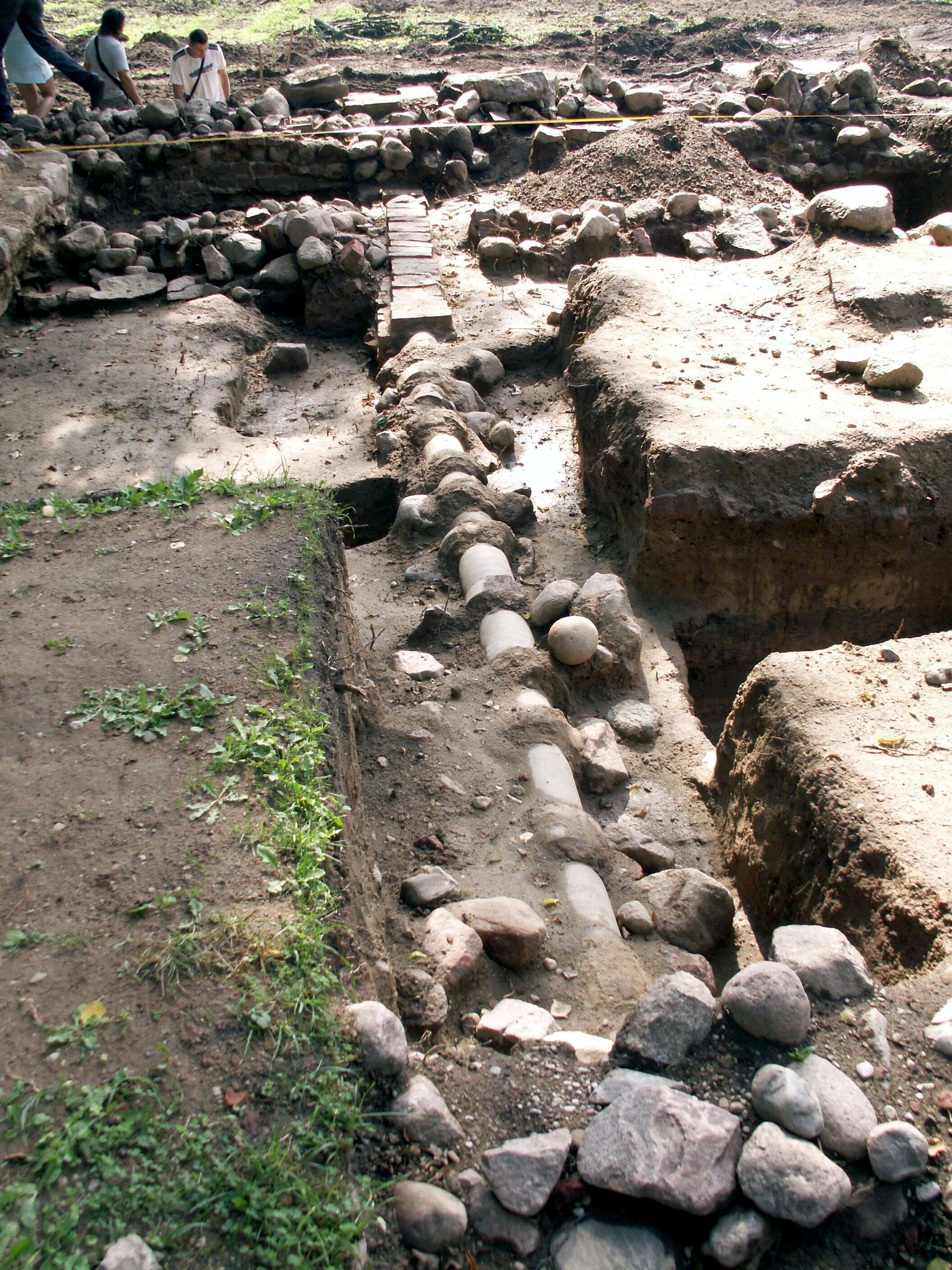
Kurtuvėnai Manor archaeological research

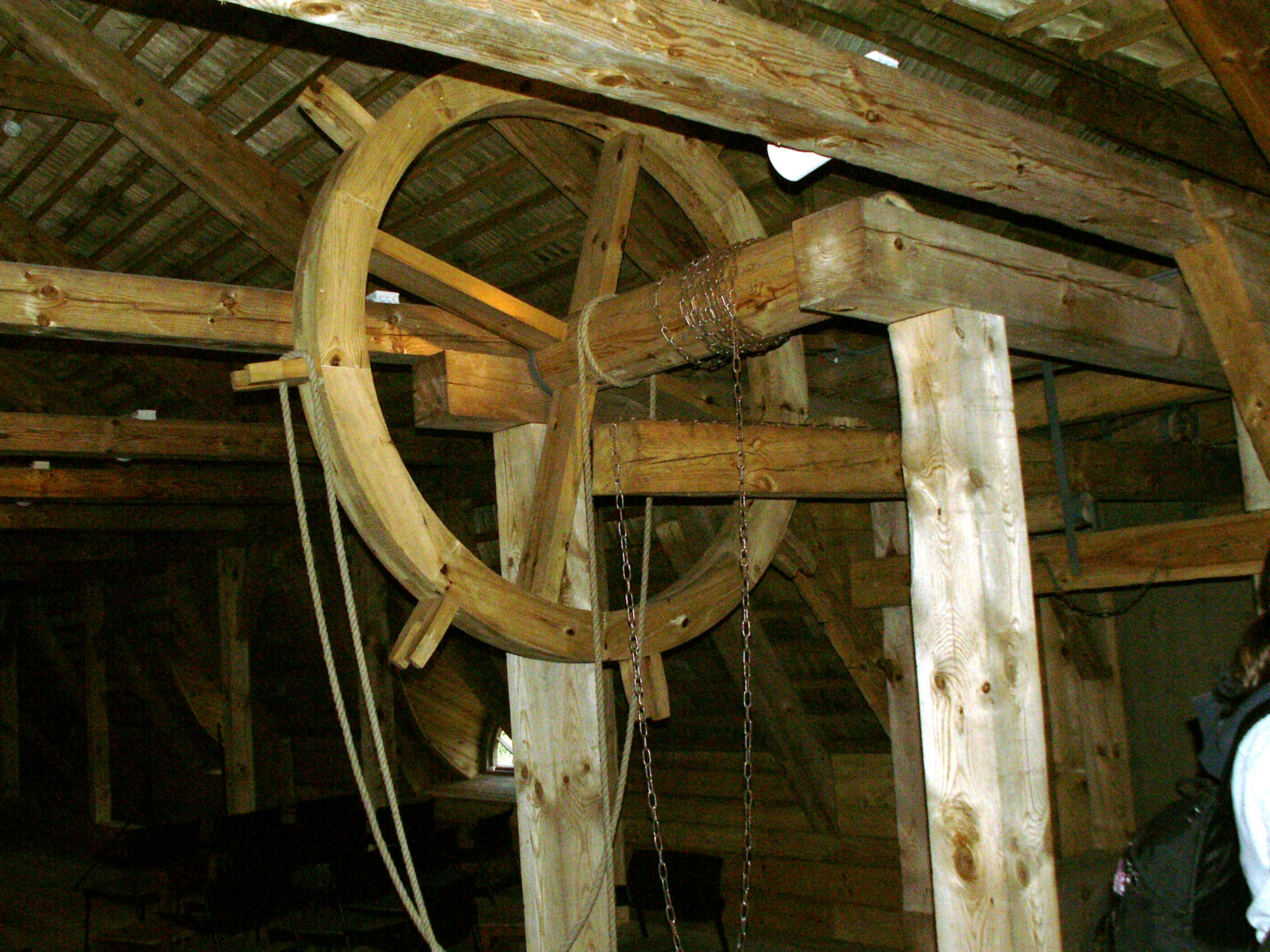
Barn wheel

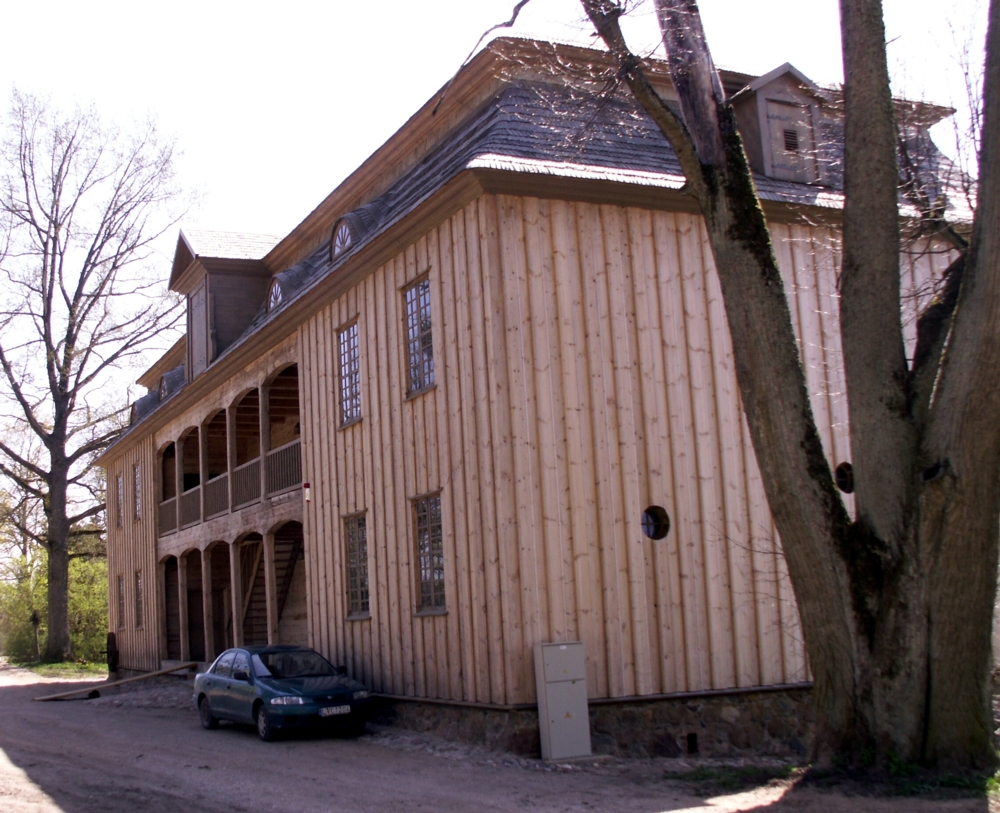
Barn
