= Žemaitė =

Lithuanian writer, democrat and educator

Julija Beniuševičiūtė-Žymantienė
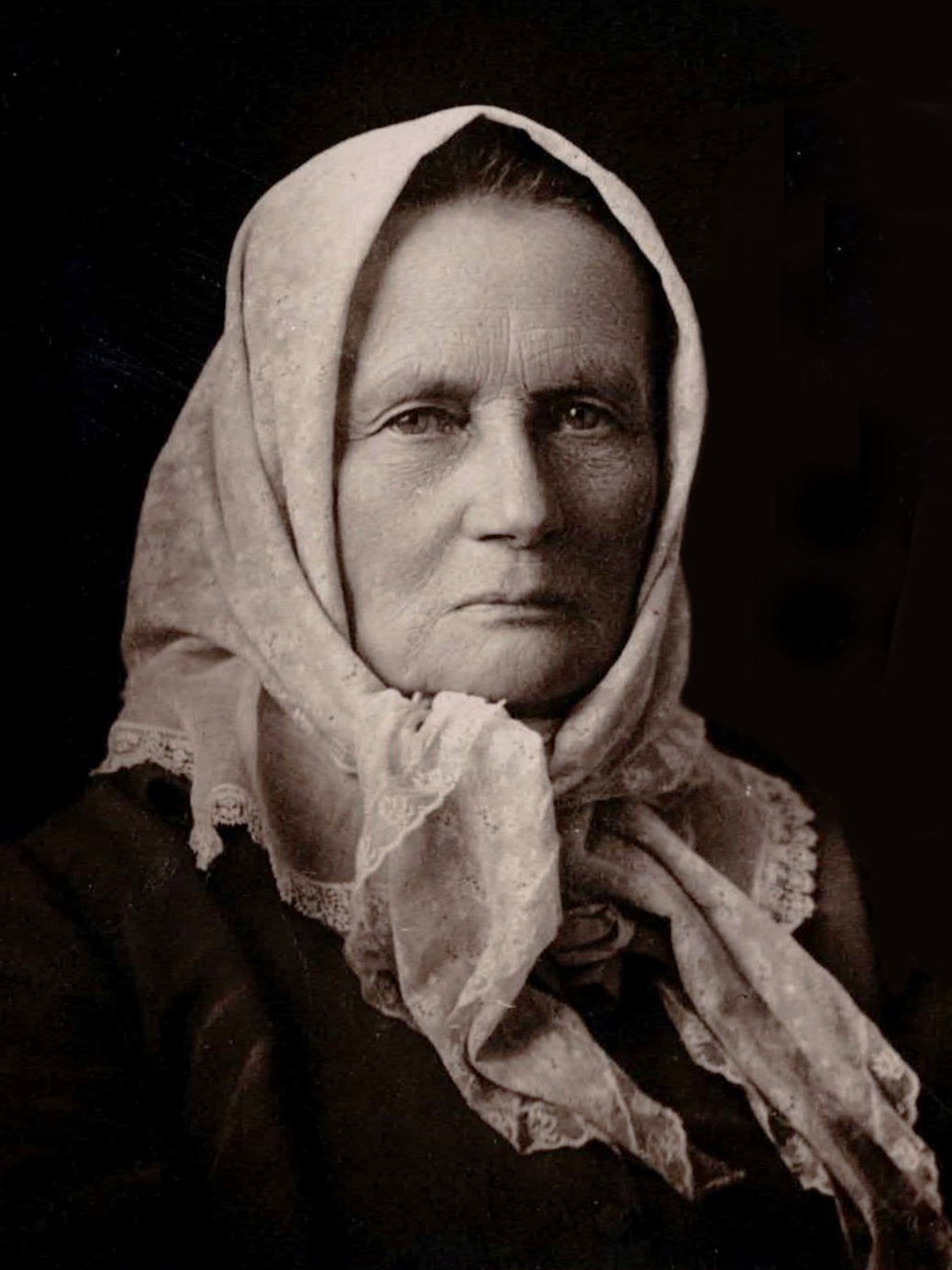
- Žemaitė in ~1916
- Born: 31 May 1845; Bukantė, Vilna Governorate, Russian Empire (in modern Lithuania)
- Died: 7 December 1921 (aged 76); Marijampolė, Suvalkija, Lithuania
- Occupation: writer
- Spouse: Laurynas Žymantas
- Parent(s): Antanas Beniuševičius; Julijana Sciepuraitė
- Writing career
- Language: Lithuanian

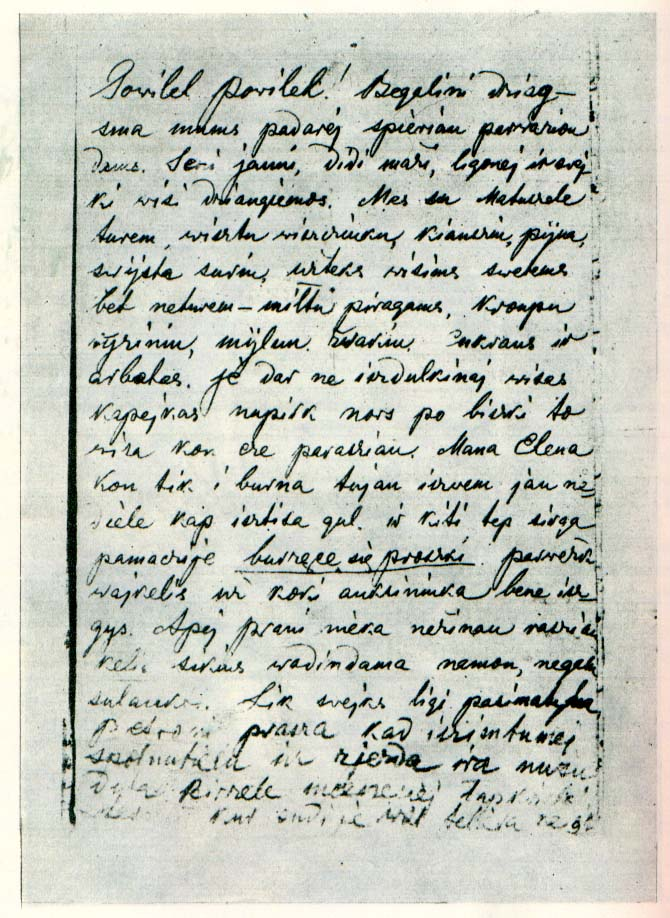
Notes of Žemaitė

Julija Beniuševičiūtė-Žymantienė (4 June [O.S. 23 May] 1845 – 7 December 1921), known by the pen name Žemaitė ([ʒʲɛˈmɐjtʲeː], zh'yeh-MY-tay, "Samogitian woman"), was a Lithuanian writer, democrat and lecturer. Born to impoverished gentry, she became one of the major participants in the Lithuanian National Revival. She wrote about peasant life in the style best described as realism.

== Life ==
Žemaitė was born in a manor house near Plungė in the Kovno Governorate of the Russian Empire. Her father Antanas Beniuševičius (died 1878) served as a manor steward and her mother Julijana Sciepuraitė (died 1874) was a housekeeper. Žemaitė had three sisters.

As a child, she was forbidden by her parents to play with the children of serfs or learn the Lithuanian language. Like many of the Lithuanian nobility, her parents had become Polonized, and were of the belief that speaking Lithuanian was a step backward socially, so her parents used the surname Bieniuszewicz and the Polish language in everyday life, and they also brought up their children in Polish culture. Nevertheless, she did learn the language and gained a deep affection for the common people. She understood the burden of serfdom and the resulting misery that came from poverty. This perspective would later form the basis for much of her creative work. Žemaitė did not receive formal education and was largely self-taught from the many books she read.

She strongly supported the uprising of 1863, and a few years later married an active participant of the uprising, Laurynas Žymantas. They met on the Džiuginėnai estate, where they were both employed. For the next twenty years, Žemaitė worked on their farm, raised their children, and battled poverty. What remained from her childhood was her passion for reading, which was soon joined by her first attempts at writing, first in Polish and then exclusively in Lithuanian. In 1883, the family moved to a village near Užventis. She came in contact with Povilas Višinskis who gave her various Lithuanian periodicals (Aušra, Varpas, and Apžvalga), and encouraged her to write and participate in the national awakening of Lithuania. Her first work, Autumn Evening (Lithuanian: Rudens vakaras), was published in a calendar in 1895 when she was over 40 years old. Višinskis and Jonas Jablonskis helped her and edited her works and gave her advice, and thus a talent was awakened.

Žemaitė took part in the first Lithuanian women's congress in 1907 as well as the Russian women's congress in Saint Petersburg in 1908.

In 1912, she moved to Vilnius where she worked as an administrator and on the editorial staff of several publications, including Lietuvos žinios. During World War I, she first emigrated to Russia and subsequently to the United States, where her son Antanas had been living for several years. There she gave lectures to various Lithuanian-American organizations, collected funds for the victims of the war, and wrote articles for the local press. In 1921, she returned to Lithuania, and died the same year.

== Pseudonym ==
Inspired by Povilas Višinskis, Žemaitė wrote her first tale 'An Autumn Evening' (lit. Rudens Vakaras) in Ušnėnai in 1894. Povilas Višinskis suggested the tale to G. Petkevičaitė-Bitė and J. Jablonskis who then published it in The True Lithuanian Farmers' Calendar for 1895 (lit. „Tikrasis Lietuvos ūkininkų kalendorius 1895 metams“). Suggested by Jonas Jablonskis, the editors published the tale under Žemaitė pseudonym as it was written in the Samogitian dialect. Since then, she began using this pseudonym for the remainder of her works.

== Works ==
In her lifetime Žemaitė wrote about 354 tales, novelettes, essays, over a dozen of plays, stories about her childhood as well as a number of articles, correspondences. Her works have been published in Ūkininkas, Varpas, Vienybė lietuvninkų, Naujienos, Darbininkų balsas, Vilniaus žinios, Lietuvos ūkininkas.

Žemaitė wrote about peasants in a vernacular that closely resembled the language spoken by them – lively and rich in vocabulary. Her works are usually dark as she depicts poverty, materialism, and arguments within a family. The author paints natural images of everyday life with petty conflicts, lively conversations, impoverished surroundings, and beautiful nature. Throughout her work a particular emphasis has been placed upon a woman's role in family, domestic life and society as a whole which had a significant impact on the development of feminist ideology in the region. Simply by describing poverty, moral indecency and its effects on inter-personal and family relations, Žemaitė unravelled widespread violence against women, vulnerability of minors and the overall patriarchal nature of society at the time. Nevertheless, despite being born to a gentry family, she did not describe gentry life as it was foreign and unfriendly to her.

She wrote the best works in 1896–1898. Among some 150 works, best known are:

- Marti (Daughter-in-Law)
- Topylis
- Petras Kurmelis
- Sučiuptas velnias (Caught Devil)
- Sutkai
- Gera galva (Good Head)

== Legacy ==
She is the only woman featured on litas banknotes that first appeared in circulation in 1994. Printed at Thomas de la Rue publishing house in England, the banknote depicts a portrayal of Žemaitė which was created by an artist named Giedrius Jonaitis.

The 1 litas banknote was replaced with coins in 1998, although remained in circulation until 2007. However, the long-lasting memory of it remained within the consciousness of the people who reminisce the banknote with nostalgia.

A memorial museum at the Zemaitija National Park was dedicated in her honor, and "Acquaintance with the Samogitian Culinary Heritage" classes are organized at the museum.

== Sources ==
- Buchowski, Krzysztof (2009). "Kobiety w litewskim odrodzeniu narodowym". In Dajnowicz, Małgorzata (ed.). Zachodnie wzorce i wschodnie realia. Przedstawicielki elit prowincjonalnych w XIX i pierwszej połowie XX wieku. Białystok.
- Simas Sužiedėlis, ed. (1970–1978). "Žemaitė". Encyclopedia Lituanica. Vol. VI. Boston, Massachusetts: Juozas Kapočius. pp. 307–309. LCCN 74114275. OCLC 95559.
- Tarybų Lietuvos Enciklopedija. Vyriausioji enciklopedijų redakcija. Vilnius, 1988.
- Valstybinė grožinės literatūros leidykla. " Žemaitė gyvenime ir kūryboje" Vilnius, 1956 m.
- Sauka, D., 1988. „Žemaitės stebuklas". Vaga. ISBN 9785415000104
