= Papilė Eldership =

Eldership of Lithuania

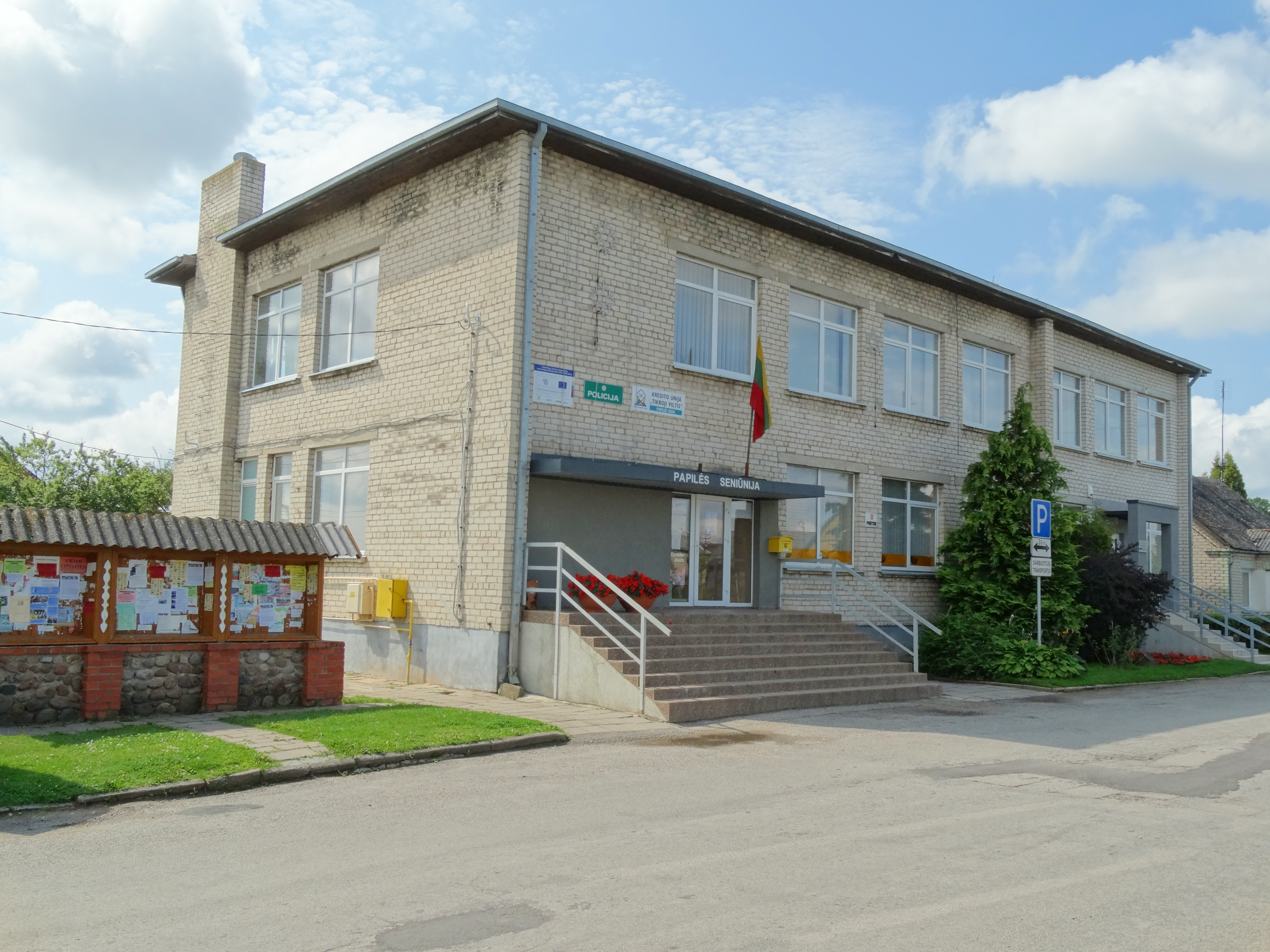
Papilė Eldership, Akmenė district, Lithuania

The Papilė Eldership (Lithuanian: Papilės seniūnija) is an eldership of Lithuania, located in the Akmenė District Municipality. In 2021 its population was 2475.
