= Ivanovsky (surname) =

Ivanovsky or Ivanovski (Russian: Ивановский; feminine: Ivanovskaya, Russian: Ивановская) is a Russian surname. It may refer to the following notable people:

- Aleksandr Ivanovsky, Soviet film director and screenwriter
- Alexandra Ivanovskaya, Russian model
- Dmitri Ivanovsky (1864–1920), Russian biologist
- Lyubov Ivanovskaya (born 1989), professional Russian triathlete
- Oleg Ivanovsky (1922–2014), Soviet spacecraft designer
- Praskovya Ivanovskaya, Russian revolutionary
- Roman Ivanovsky (born 1977), Russian breaststroke swimmer
- Vyacheslav Ivanovsky, Russian weightlifter
- Yevgeny Ivanovsky
