= Varpas =

Lithuanian-language newspaper

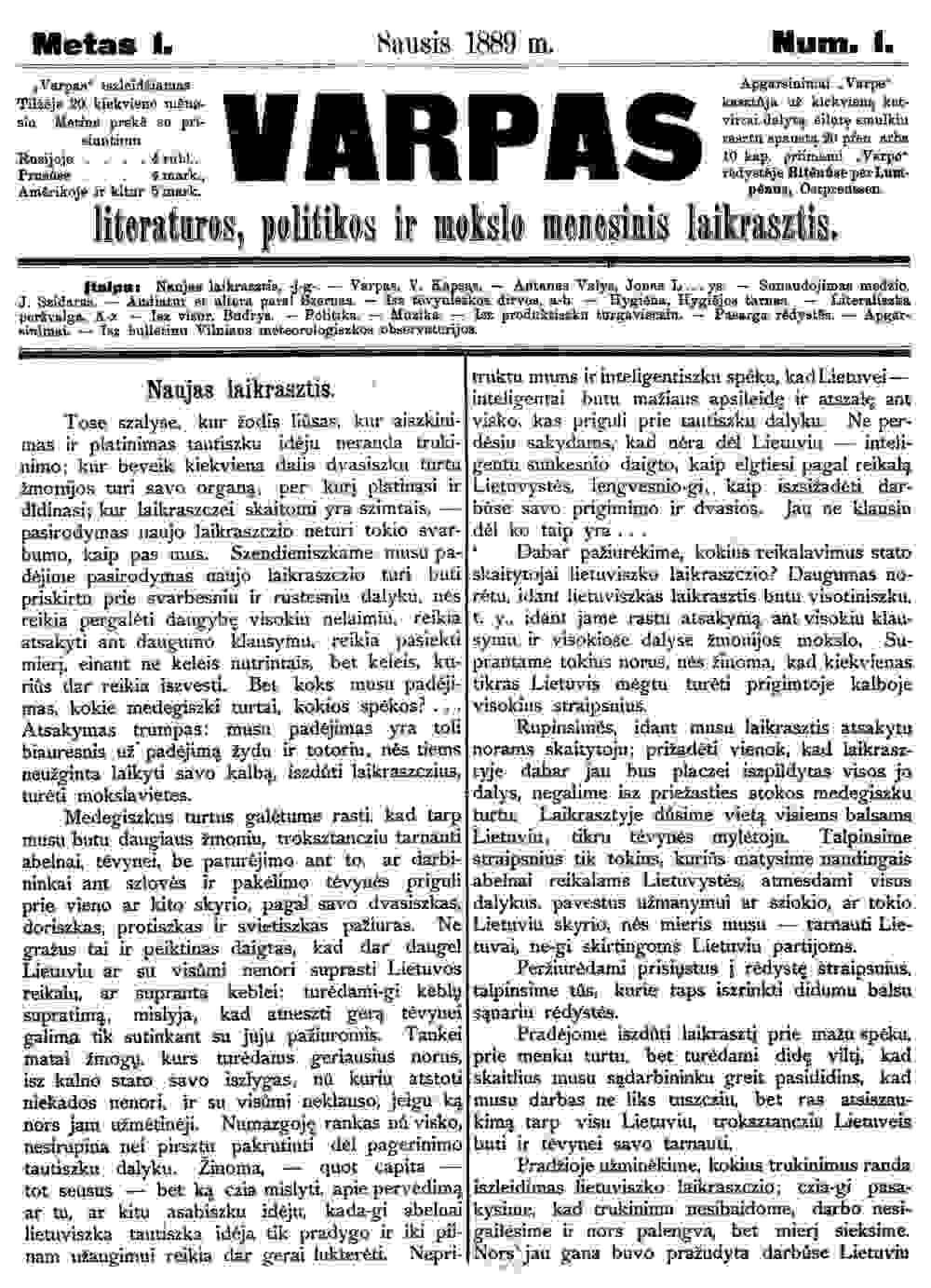
Cover page of the first issue of Varpas (1889)

Varpas (literally: The Bell) was a monthly Lithuanian-language newspaper published during the Lithuanian press ban from January 1889 to December 1905. Because its publication was illegal in Lithuania, then part of the Russian Empire, it was printed in Tilsit (current Sovetsk) and Ragnit (current Neman) in German East Prussia and smuggled into Lithuania by the knygnešiai (book smugglers). Varpas, with circulation of about 500 to 1,000 copies, played a pivotal role in the Lithuanian National Revival. Tautiška giesmė, one of poems by founder and editor Vincas Kudirka written to commemorate the 10th anniversary of Varpas, became the Lithuanian national anthem. Editorial staff of Varpas later started two more specialized publications: more practical Ūkininkas (The Farmer, 1890–1905) for less educated peasants and apolitical Naujienos (News, 1901–1903) for general public.

== History ==
After the first national Lithuanian newspaper Aušra ceased publication in 1886 due to financial difficulties, activists sought to either revive or replace Aušra. A group of Lithuanian students in Moscow organized publication of short-lived Šviesa, a monthly pro-Catholic newspaper that failed to satisfy liberal activists. Lithuanian students in Warsaw, led by Vincas Kudirka, Jonas Gaidamavičius, and Juozas Adomaitis-Šernas, organized society Lietuva (Lithuania). The society first thought of reviving secular Aušra, but decided against it as it could have resurrected disputes with the clergy. Thus in January 1889 appeared a brand new newspaper Varpas. It attempted to unite liberal, socialist, and Catholic fractions of the Lithuanian National Revival. Despite various difficulties (financial strains, delivery through underground knygnešiai network) it lasted longer than any other Lithuanian periodical of the period. Varpas played an important role forming ideas of Lithuanian nation and standardizing Lithuanian language. For example, in 1890 Kudirka published recommendations regarding Lithuanian orthography: he suggested to replace common "sz" and "cz" borrowed from Polish with new "š" and "č" borrowed from Czech. Both new letters are now integral part of standard Lithuanian.

== Content ==
Varpas was geared towards intelligentsia with stated goal to rise Lithuanian national consciousness and, ultimately, to achieve autonomy within the Russian Empire. Influenced by Polish positivism, Varpas argued that Lithuanians could achieve this through work, economic development, education, and other non-violent means. Therefore, much of the articles included discussions about improving land reform, school system, health care, transportation network, etc. Some articles were more practical "how to" guides, but most remained theoretical lectures and discussions. About a quarter of Varpas content was related history. However, unlike Aušra, it rejected Romantic idealization of heroic past (which lead to two failed uprisings in 1830 and 1863) and concentrated on more practical and useful contemporary history. Writers believed that understanding of current European politics could provide more beneficial than glorification of the old Grand Duchy of Lithuania.

Varpas was also a political newspaper, criticizing Tsarist policies, demanding abolition of the Lithuanian press ban and other Russification practices, and requesting equal cultural and political rights for all nations within the Russian empire. Varpas also maintained an anti-Polish position, but abandoned some oversimplified prejudice against Poles and Polonized Lithuanians that was apparent in Aušra. For example, instead of blaming foreigners (Poles or Russians) for the demise of the Grand Duchy of Lithuania, writers looked for internal reasons for the historical failures. However, the newspaper still called for development and strengthening of distinctively Lithuanian culture separate from Polish. Political demands included autonomy for Lithuania, but not resurrection of the Polish–Lithuanian Commonwealth. Towards the end of its publication and the Russian Revolution of 1905, Varpas became more socialist, including co-editor Vincas Mickevičius-Kapsukas, future leader of the Lithuanian Soviet Socialist Republic (1918–1919).

Overall, the content of Varpas was extremely varied. In an attempt to unite various political fractions, efforts were made to include liberal, socialist, Catholic, and other articles. One column could contradict another.

== Editors and contributors ==
Even though Kudirka officially edited just the first few issues of Varpas, he is widely considered to be the driving force behind the newspaper. Up until his death in 1899, Kudirka wrote and edited influential column Tėvynės varpai (Bells of the Homeland) where he published articles on a variety of subjects: advocating unity among various social classes and political fractions for the greater benefit of the entire nation, satirical short stories mocking Russian authorities, theoretical articles about journalism and literature, etc. Other editors included Juozas Adomaitis-Šernas, Jurgis Šaulys, Antanas Milukas, Petras Mikolainis, Martynas Jankus, Juozas Bagdonas, Povilas Višinskis.

The newspaper, in line with its goal to promote Lithuanian language and literature, also published a number of literary works by various Lithuanian authors: Pranas Mašiotas, Vincas Kapsukas, Gabrielė Petkevičaitė-Bitė, Jonas Vileišis, Žemaitė, Šatrijos Ragana, Jonas Biliūnas, Povilas Višinskis, Sofija Pšibiliauskienė, and others. Hoping to raise artistic quality, their works were reviewed by Kudirka and Stasys Matulaitis. Works by foreign authors were also translated and published in Varpas. Academic articles on Lithuanian language and attempts to standardize it were published by Jonas Jablonskis. Future President of Lithuania Kazys Grinius also contributed to the newspaper. Because the publication was illegal, many authors used various pen names and pseudonyms that changed frequently; a few articles were unsigned. Therefore, it is sometimes difficult to determine actual authors. Overall, about 90 to 150 people (called varpininkai) contributed to Varpas, including a number of the contributors to Aušra. Varpininkai organized annual conferences and meetings to discuss direction of the newspaper.
