= Vincas Kudirka =

Lithuanian writer, poet and physician (1858–1899)

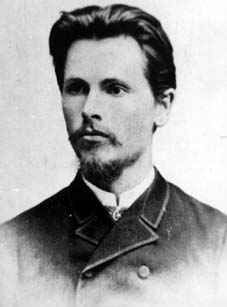
Vincas Kudirka

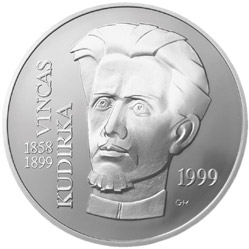
Litas coin issued to commemorate Vincas Kudirka

Vincas Kudirka (Polish: Wincenty Kudyrko; 31 December [O.S. 19 December] 1858 – 16 November [O.S. 4 November] 1899) was a Lithuanian poet and physician, and the author of both the music and lyrics of the Lithuanian national anthem, "Tautiška giesmė". He is regarded in Lithuania as a national hero. Kudirka used the pen names V. Kapsas, Paežerių Vincas, Vincas Kapsas, P.Vincas, Varpas, Q.D, K., V.K, Perkūnas.

Kudirka was born in Paežeriai, in the Augustów Governorate of Congress Poland (present-day Lithuania). He began studying history and philosophy in Warsaw in 1881, but changed his major to medicine the following year. During his studies, he was a member of the revolutionary organization Great Proletariat, for which he was arrested and expelled from the university in 1885. He was reinstated as a student in 1887. He graduated in 1889, and worked as a country doctor in Šakiai and Naumiestis.

During his school years Kudirka was writing poetry in Polish. In 1888 he began writing poetry in Lithuanian. As a middle school student, he considered himself a Pole, but under the influence of Lithuanian national activists, including Jonas Jablonskis, he embraced Lithuanian national consciousness. Simultaneously he became more active in the Lithuanian national rebirth movement. Together with other Lithuanian students in Warsaw, he founded the secret society Lietuva ("Lithuania"). The following year the society began publishing the clandestine newspaper Varpas ("The Bell"), which Kudirka edited and contributed to for the next ten years. In issue number 6 of Varpas, in September 1898, he published the text of Tautiška Giesmė, which would officially become in 1918, the Lithuanian National Anthem, set to music written by Kudirka himself. In the 1890s, he was writing correspondence for the Warsaw weekly "Głos" under the pseudonym Nemunas.

Kudirka gave much to Lithuanian culture, and also published a collection of Lithuanian popular songs. He was also a noted writer of satire. Kudirka is considered a good translator, having translated the works of George Byron, Friedrich Schiller, Juliusz Słowacki, Adam Asnyk, Maria Konopnicka and Adam Mickiewicz into Lithuanian.

He died of tuberculosis at Naumiestis, on 16 November 1899, at age 40. The second half of "Tautiška giesmė" was engraved on his gravestone.

== Legacy ==
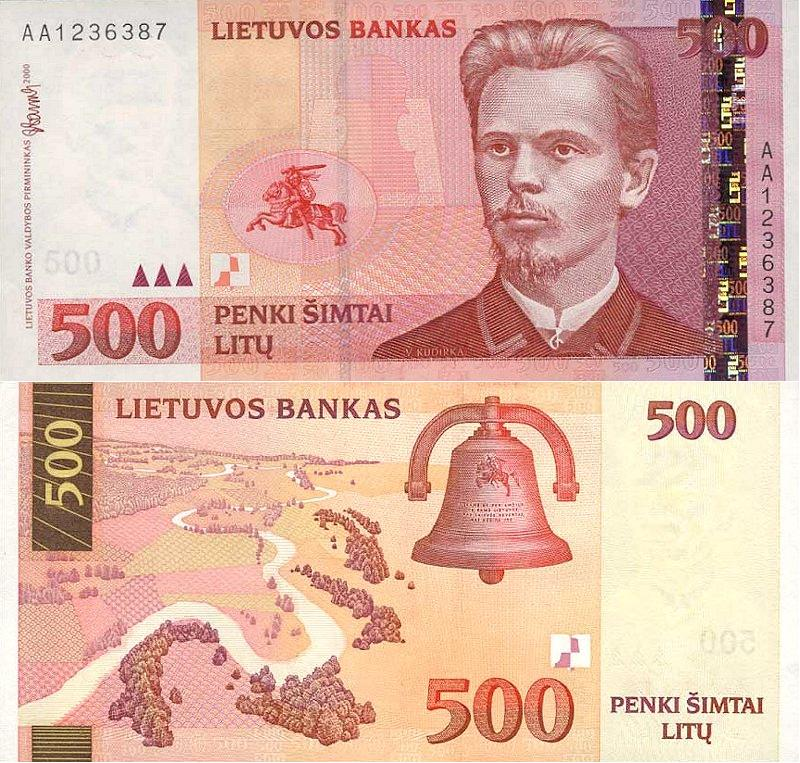
500 litas banknote

On 5 July 2009, a statue of Vincas Kudirka was unveiled beside the Gediminas Avenue, the main street of the capital Vilnius. The unveiling, by dignitaries, including the Lithuanian President Valdas Adamkus, coincided with festivities marking the 1000th anniversary of the first time Lithuania was mentioned in official chronicles.

Vincas Kudirka Square, Vilnius

Naumiestis was renamed to Kudirkos Naumiestis.

Vincas Kudirka Bridge in the historical part of Kudirkos Naumiestis. In 2021 included into the Lithuanian Register of Cultural Values.

Minor planet 319009 Kudirka is named for him.

Displayed on the 500 litas banknote.

Annual prize of the Lithuanian Union of Journalist is named Vincas Kudirka Prize.

== Bibliography ==
- Jackiewicz, Mieczysław (1993). Literatura polska na Litwie XVI-XX wieku [Polish literature in Lithuania of the 16th-20th centuries] (in Polish). Olsztyn: Wydawnictwa Wyższej Szkoły Pedagogicznej w Olsztynie.
- Jackiewicz, Mieczysław (1999). Literatura litewska w Polsce w XIX i XX wieku [Lithuanian literature in Poland in the 19th and 20th centuries] (in Polish). Olsztyn: Wydawnictwa Wyższej Szkoły Pedagogicznej w Olsztynie.
