= Marija Lastauskienė =

Lithuanian writer of Polish origin

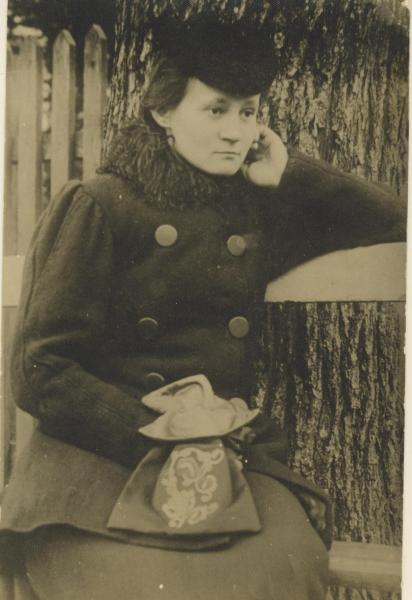
Lastauskienė around 1902

Marija Lastauskienė née Ivanauskaitė (Polish: Maria Lastowska, née Iwanowska) (15 May 1872 in Šiauliai – 19 July 1957 in Kaunas) and her sister Sofija Pšibiliauskienė were Lithuanian sisters who wrote under the shared pen name Lazdynų Pelėda (Hazel Owl). Marija married Belarusian literary critic and politician Vaclau Lastouski (Lastauskas), but divorced after a few years.

== Biography ==
Born in Šiauliai, Lastauskienė grew up and spent her youth in a family estate in Paragiai. Her father was painter Nikodem Erazm Iwanowski, mother was Karolina née Peczkiewiczówna. Her family, of Polish–Lithuanian nobility stock, was influenced by Polish culture. Therefore, her native language was Polish and she had difficulties writing in Lithuanian. Lastauskienė did not have formal education and self-educated reading various Polish authors. At the age of sixteen she moved to Warsaw to work as a seamstress at her aunt's shop. She later moved to Saint Petersburg and Riga, before settling down in Vilnius, where her sister lived, in 1907. Encouraged by her sister, Lastauskienė began writing more actively. During World War I, the sisters moved back to their childhood home in Paragiai. In 1938 Lastauskienė moved to Kaunas, where she died in 1957. Since 1966 a museum is established in their former farmstead. In 1993 a monument to the sisters was erected in Vilnius (sculptor Dalia Matulaitė, architects Jūras Balkevičius and Rimantas Buivydas).

Marija Lastauskienė's younger daughter, Stasė (Stanisława) Lastauskaitė-Matulevičienė, was also a writer. Her best-known novel is Prie nykstančių gairių (lit. 'At the Vanishing Signposts', 1939).

== Works ==
She began writing at the age of seventeen and her first story Bez steru (Without a Rudder) was published in a Warsaw newspaper. However, influenced by her older sister Sofija Pšibiliauskienė, Lastauskienė began writing for Lithuanian press. Pšibiliauskienė would freely edit and translate her sister's works into Lithuanian and publish under the common pen name Lazdynų Pelėda. It is unclear how many of the works published between 1905 (the first time the pen name was used) and 1927 (Sofija's death) should be attributed to Lastauskienė and how much of the original work remained after Pšibiliauskienė's edits. The public did not know that there are two people writing under the same name. Literary critics tend to treat this body of works as one item as they are similar in themes and language.

After her sister's death, Lastauskienė wrote in Lithuanian and her daughter corrected the language. The first works published under her own name were short story Auka (Sacrifice, 1907–1908) and novel Šviesa ir šešėliai (Light and Shadows, 1925–1926). Influenced by Polish literature, Lastauskienė's work share sentimental idealism and melancholy, but also have features of realism. Without formal education, her works were weaker on literary techniques, character depth, or stylistic devices, but attracted readers by offering imaginative and captivating plots. Her works usually feature a protagonist, idealist desiring a happy and peaceful life, who is broken by harsh reality: poverty, social inequality, rigid traditions, or simply unexpected accidents. Lastauskienė showed sympathy for these characters and condemned the oppressors. Lastauskienė more often depicted city dwellers, factory workers, and intelligentsia than villagers and farmers.

== Bibliography ==
- Fedorowicz, Irena (2022). "Między polskością a litewskością, między marzeniami a rzeczywistością – żmudzka saga rodziny Iwanowskich (Widma przeszłości Mariji Lastauskienė)". Zagadnienia bilingwizmu. Seria 2, Rodzina Miłoszów i rody pogranicza polsko-litewskiego. p. 355.
