= Sofija Pšibiliauskienė =

Lithuanian writer of Polish origin

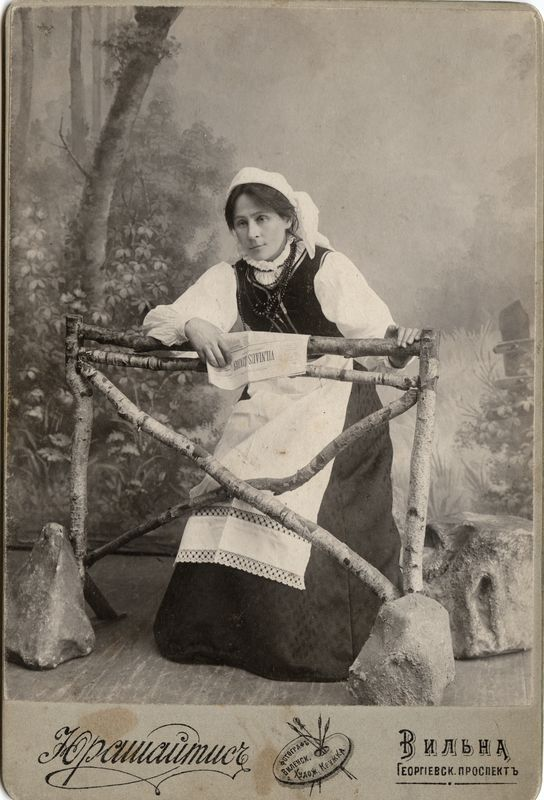
Sofija Ivanauskaitė-Pšibiliauskienė in 1900s

Sofija Pšibiliauskienė née Ivanauskaitė (Polish: Zofia Przybylewska, née Iwanowska; September 16, 1867 in Paragiai, Shavelsky Uyezd, Kovno Governorate – March 15, 1926 in Paragiai) and Marija Lastauskienė were two Lithuanian sister writers of Polish origin, using the same pen name Lazdynų Pelėda (Hazel Owl).

== Biography ==
Pšibiliauskienė was born to an impractical painter Nikodem Erazm Iwanowski of Polish–Lithuanian nobility stock. Pšibiliauskienė did not have formal education and self-educated reading various sentimental novels by Polish authors. In 1891, she married their neighbor landowner Rapolas Pšibiliauskas (Polish: Rafał Przybylewski), but the marriage was not happy. In 1903, with two small children, Pšibiliauskienė moved out to Vilnius. She took random jobs as a bookstore saleswoman, seamstress, pharmacy assistant, but still barely managed to avoid poverty. In 1914, she moved to Kaunas, where she fell ill with tuberculosis. She then returned to her childhood home in Paragiai, where she died in 1926. Since 1966, a museum is established in her former farmstead. In 1993, a monument to the sisters was erected in Vilnius (sculptor Dalia Matulaitė, architects Jūras Balkevičius and Rimantas Buivydas).

== Works ==
Pšibiliauskienė started writing after encouragement from Povilas Višinskis in 1898. She first contributed to various Lithuanian periodicals, including Varpas and Ūkininkas. After separating from her husband and moving to Vilnius, she could spend more time writing. Her early works depict struggle between landless peasants and corrupt landowners. In short stories Klajūnas (The Wanderer, 1902) and Stebuklingoji tošelė (The Magic Reed-Pipe, 1907) Pšibiliauskienė, in a didactic tone, wrote how peasants were exploited and morally degraded by lazy and selfish estate owners. Most of her characters were oppressed by misfortunes, social injustice, and their own flaws. Her ambitious work, novella Klaida (Mistake, 1908), attempted to analyze and criticize the period leading to the Russian Revolution of 1905 (between 1890 and 1905), but failed to explain deeper causes of the revolution.

In 1907, her sister Marija Lastauskienė also moved to Vilnius. Encouraged by Pšibiliauskienė, Lastauskienė would write in Polish, her sister would translate and edit the works, and publish them under the pen name Lazdynų Pelėda. It is unclear how many of the works published between 1905 (the first time the pen name was used) and 1927 (Sofija's death) should be attributed to Lastauskienė and how much of the original work remained after Pšibiliauskienė's edits. The public did not know that there are two people writing under the same name. Literary critics tend to treat this body of works as one item as they are similar in themes and language.
