= Ūkininkas =

Lithuanian-language newspaper

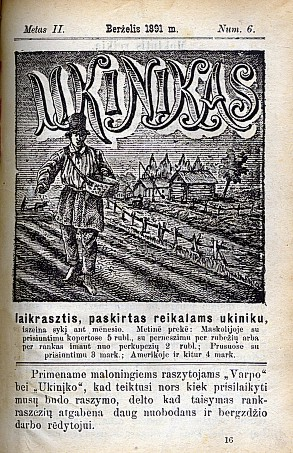
Cover page of the 6th issue of Ūkininkas (1891)

Ūkininkas or Ukinįkas (literally: The Farmer) was a monthly Lithuanian-language newspaper published during the Lithuanian press ban by the editorial staff of Varpas from 1890 to 1905. Ūkininkas was printed in Tilsit (current Sovetsk) and Ragnit (current Neman) in German East Prussia and smuggled into Lithuania by the knygnešiai.

The two newspapers shared staff and similar ideology, but Ūkininkas was geared towards less educated peasants and had larger circulation of 1,000–2,000 copies. It contained few political or cultural discourses and concentrated on practical advice regarding farming, husbandry, and forestry. It also published short news from various locations across Lithuania, helping to develop the idea of Lithuania as a single entity. Various writers, including Jonas Biliūnas, Vincas Kudirka, Gabrielė Petkevičaitė-Bitė, Sofija Pšibiliauskienė, contributed their fiction.

After publication of Ūkininkas was discontinued, it was replaced by weekly Lietuvos ūkininkas (The Lithuanian Farmer), published in Vilnius.
