= Lazdynų Pelėda =

Pseudonym of two Lithuanian sisters

Lazdynų Pelėda (literally: Hazelnut Owl) was the common pen name of two Lithuanian sisters writers: Sofija Ivanauskaitė-Pšibiliauskienė (1867–1926) and Marija Ivanauskaitė-Lastauskienė (1872–1957), who were individually mostly known by their respective marriage names. Sofija (Sophia) married a landowner R. Pšibiliauskas (Przybylewski). Marija (Maria) married Belarusian literary critic and politician Vaclau Lastouski (Lastauskas).

Their father, painter Nikodemas Ivanauskas, was a member of Lithuanian nobility.

Since 1966 a museum is established in their former farmstead. In 1993 a monument to the sisters was erected in Vilnius (sculptor Dalia Matulaitė, architects Jūras Balkevičius and Rimantas Buivydas).
