= East Samogitian Plateau =

Landform in Lithuania

East Samogitian Plateau (Lithuanian: Rytų Žemaičių plynaukštė) is a landform in central Lithuania, the eastern part of the Samogitian Upland. It continues between the Samogitian Watershed in the west and the Central Lithuanian Plain in the east. The Dubysa river marks its western margin, while the Šeduva Ridge and the Radviliškis Ridge mark its eastern margin.

The relief is hilly and undulated, there are flat and endorheic troughs with lakes and swamps. In the northern part there is the Kurtuvėnai moraine massif with altitudes of 140–160 metres (460–520 ft).

Most of the East Samogitian Plateau belongs to the Dubysa basin (with the Kražantė, Gryžuva, Dratvuo rivers). There are the Rėkyva Lake, Gauštvinis lake, Bridvaišis lake, and some smaller lakes, also some large swamps such as the Didysis Tyrulis (area of 47 square kilometres (18 sq mi)), the Praviršulio Tyrulis (36 square kilometres (14 sq mi)), the Rėkyva Swamp (26 square kilometres (10 sq mi)). The eastern part of the plateau is covered by the forests (the Tytuvėnai Forest, the Kiaunoriai–Užpelkiai–Šimša Forest).
