= Samogitian Upland =

Upland in Lithuania

Coordinates: 56°02′55″N 21°53′20″E

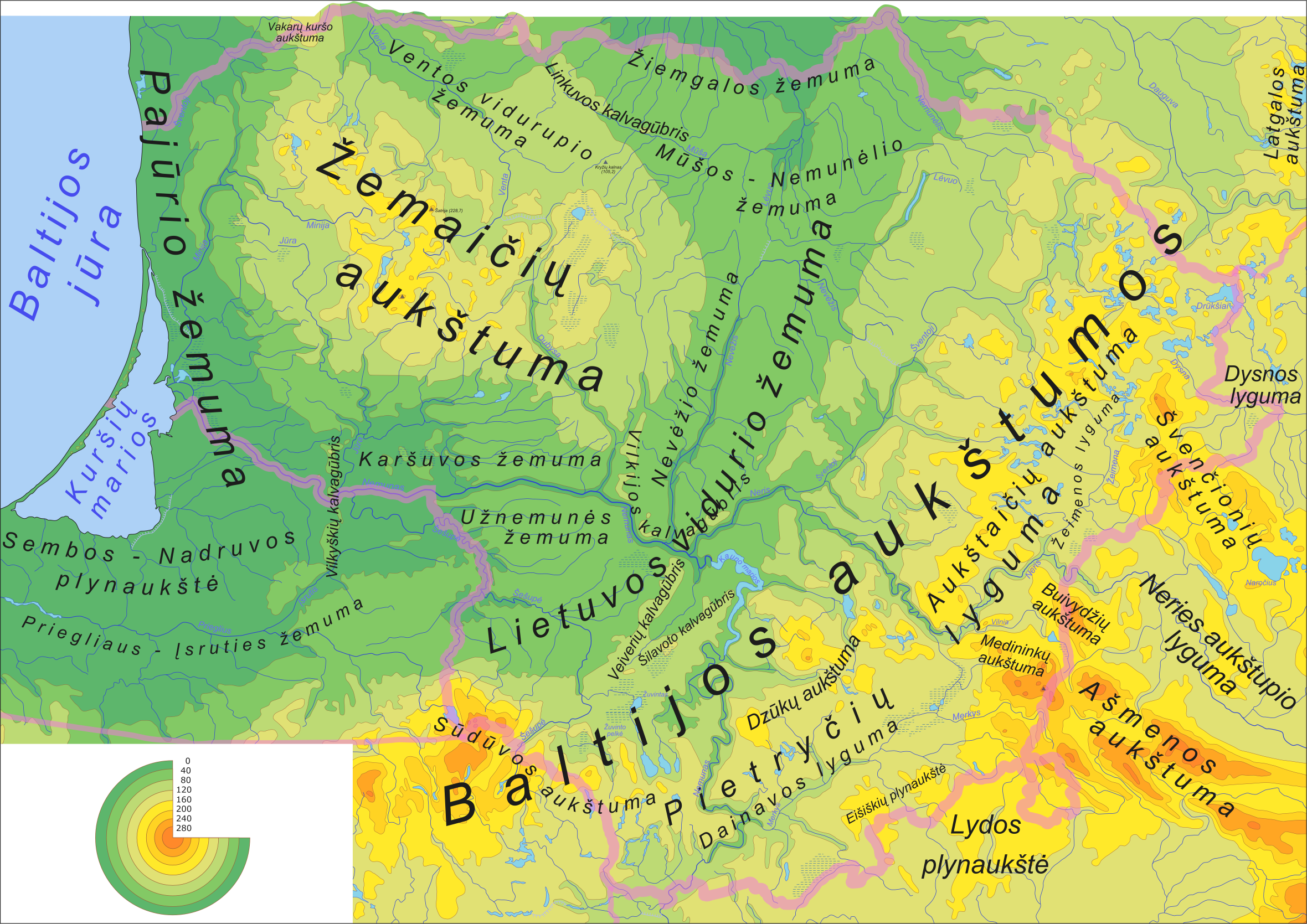
Physical map of Lithuania

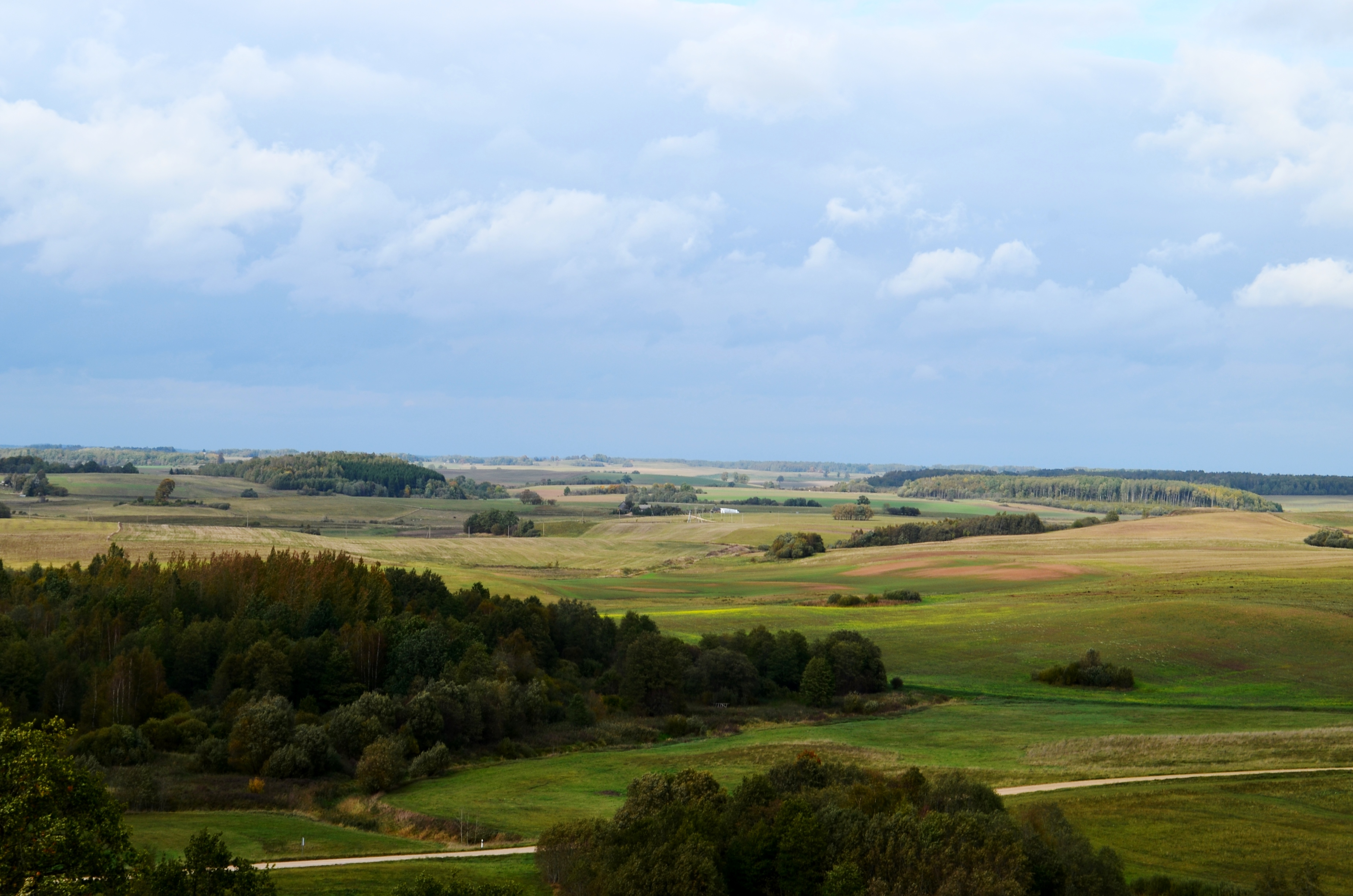
Samogitian Upland as seen from the Sprūdė Hillfort

The Samogitian Upland (Lithuanian: Žemaičių aukštuma) is a hilly terrain in the west of Lithuania. It is approximately 100 km in length in the northwest to southeast direction and 50 km in width.

The current terrain of the highlands was formed after the last ice age as a result of the repeated regressions during warmer periods and progressions during colder periods.

The Žemaitija National Park and the Varniai Regional Park are within the area.

The rivers that begin in the highlands include: Venta, Virvyčia, Minija, Babrungas, Kražantė, Akmena, Ančia. The lakes within the area include: Plateliai Lake, Lūkstas, Paršežeris, Biržulis.

Its highest, central part is the Samogitian Watershed, which contains the highest point in the upland: the Medvėgalis hill (234.6 m).

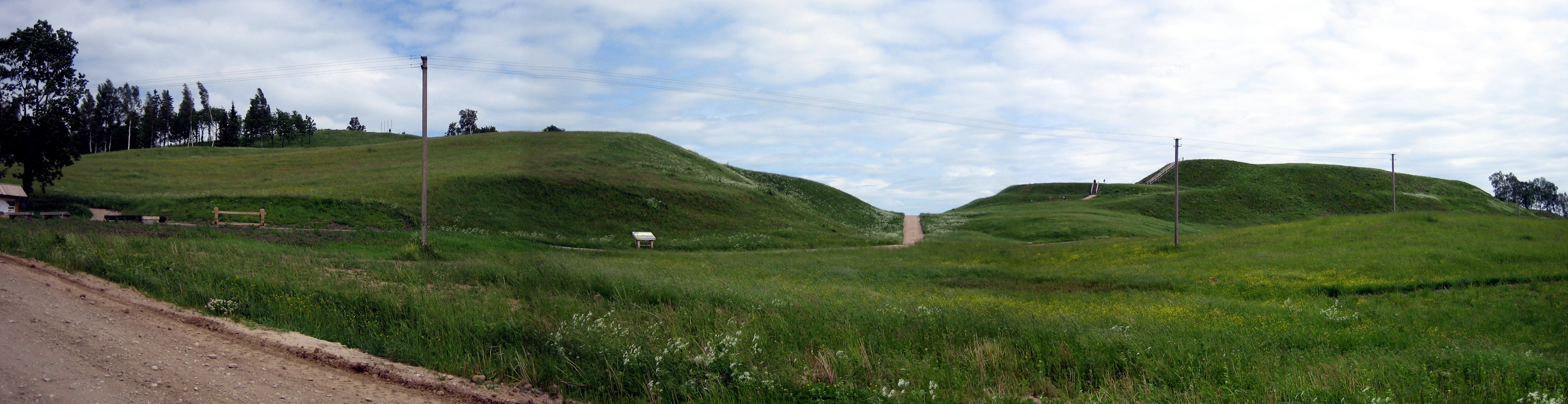
Medvėgalis Mound (left) to the north and Medvėgalis Hillfort (right)

Its eastern part is the East Samogitian Plateau, the western part is the West Samogitian Plateau.
