= Vilija Aleknaitė-Abramikienė =

Lithuanian politician

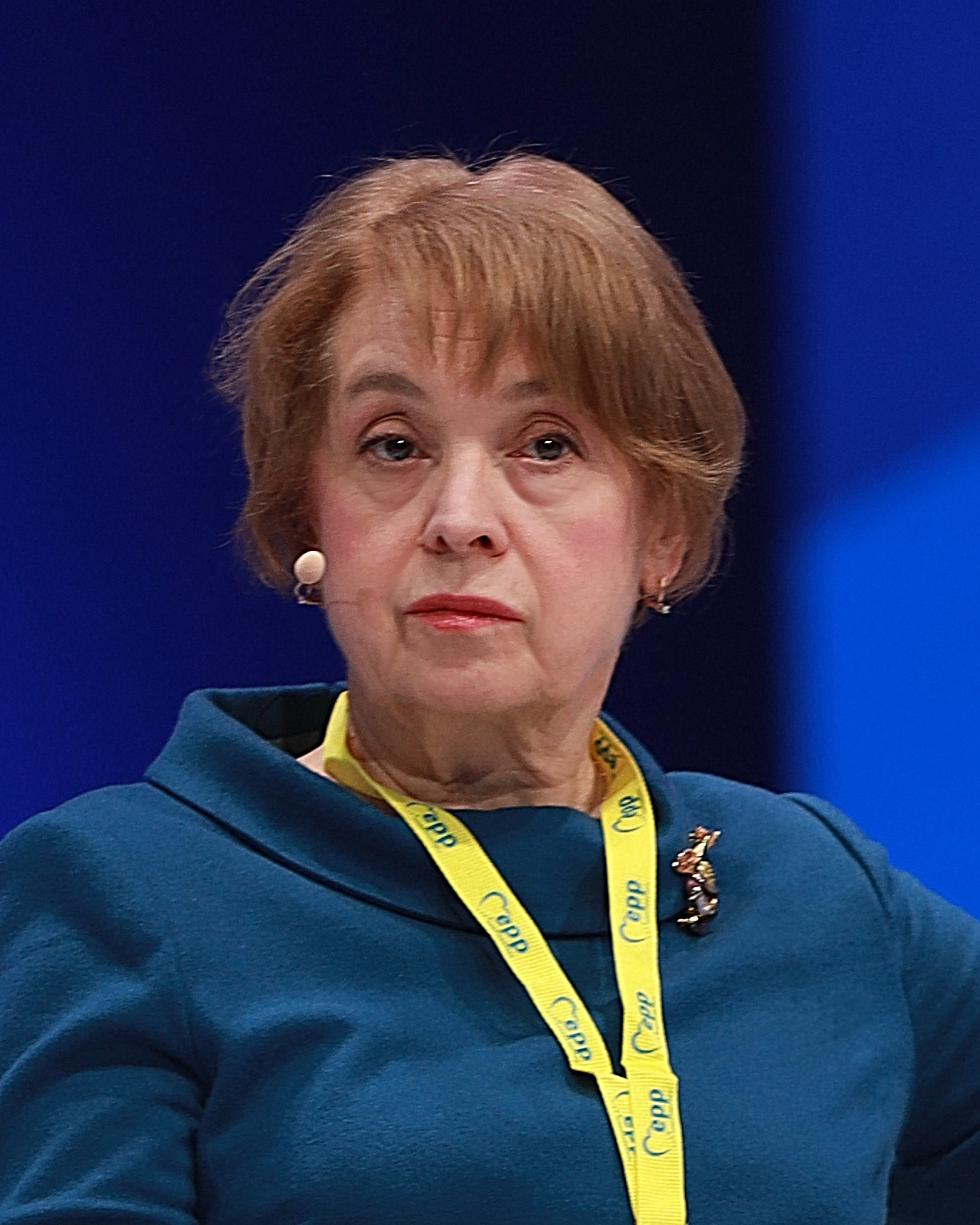

Member of Seimas
- Incumbent
- Assumed office 9 July 2019
- Preceded by: Andrius Kubilius
- Constituency: Multi-member
- In office 16 November 2012 – 14 November 2016
- Constituency: Multi-member
- In office 17 November 2008 – 15 November 2012
- Preceded by: Algis Čaplikas
- Succeeded by: Vytenis Andriukaitis
- Constituency: Žirmūnai
- In office 17 August 2004 – 16 November 2008
- Constituency: Multi-member
- In office 25 November 1996 – 17 October 2000
- Preceded by: Zita Šličytė
- Succeeded by: Vaclovas Karbauskis
- Constituency: Tauragė
- In office 25 November 1992 – 24 November 1996
- Constituency: Multi-member

Personal details
- Born: 4 May 1957 (age 68) Lyduvėnai, Raseiniai district, Lithuania
- Party: Homeland Union
- Spouse: Kęstutis Abramikas
- Children: 2

Vilija Aleknaitė-Abramikienė (born 4 May 1957 in Lyduvėnai, Raseiniai district, Lithuania) is a Lithuanian politician and member of the Seimas.

== Biography ==
Aleknaitė-Abramikienė was born to a family of Soviet Lithuania civil servants in Lyduvėnai, Raseiniai district on 4 May 1957.

In 1975 Aleknaitė-Abramikienė graduated from M.K. Čiurlionis art school, in 1980 - from the Lithuanian Conservatory, as a pianist and musicologist. From 1980 she worked at the conservatory as a concertmaster and instructor.

Aleknaitė-Abramikienė joined the activities of Sąjūdis in 1988. In the elections in 1992, Aleknaitė-Abramikienė was elected as the member of the Sixth Seimas through the electoral list of Sąjūdis. In 1993 she was one of the founding members of the Homeland Union party as it emerged from Sąjūdis. She was reelected to the Seimas in the elections of 1996, 2000, 2004, 2008 and 2012.
