= Nevėžis Plain =

Plain (lowland) in central Lithuania

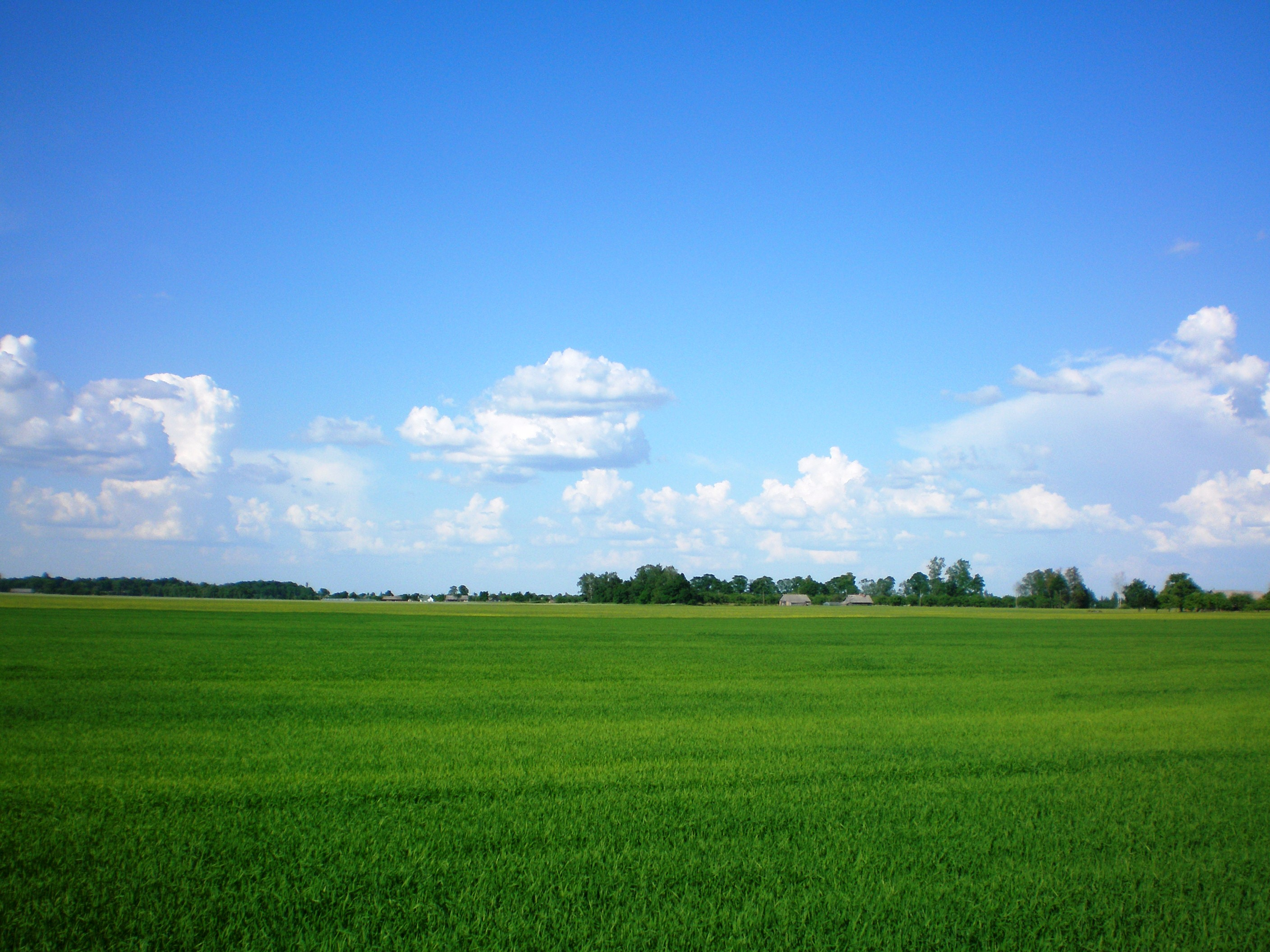
The Nevėžis Plain near Urbeliai village in Kėdainiai District Municipality

The Nevėžis Plain (Lithuanian: Nevėžio žemuma) is a plain (lowland) in central Lithuania, and makes a part of the Central Lithuanian Plain. Its northern limit is marked by the Nevėžis and Lėvuo watershed, while other limits are marked by small ridges (the Vilkija Ridge, Viešintos Ridge, Kavarskas Ridge, Krakės Ridge and others).

There are three levels of the Nevėžis Plain: Traupis level (altitude 80–90 meters or 260–300 feet), Pagiriai level (70–80 meters or 230–260 feet) and the Nevėžis river level (65 meters or 213 feet).

River density is high but rivers themselves are slow, sink during the summer. Typical soil is moraine loam with a tiny layer of sand.

The Nevėžis Plain is a heavily cultivated area (wheat, sugar beet, rapeseed, barley, potatoes) but a significant part (20–30%) is covered by forests (birch, aspen, oak, ash, pine, spruce trees).
