= Gynėvė =

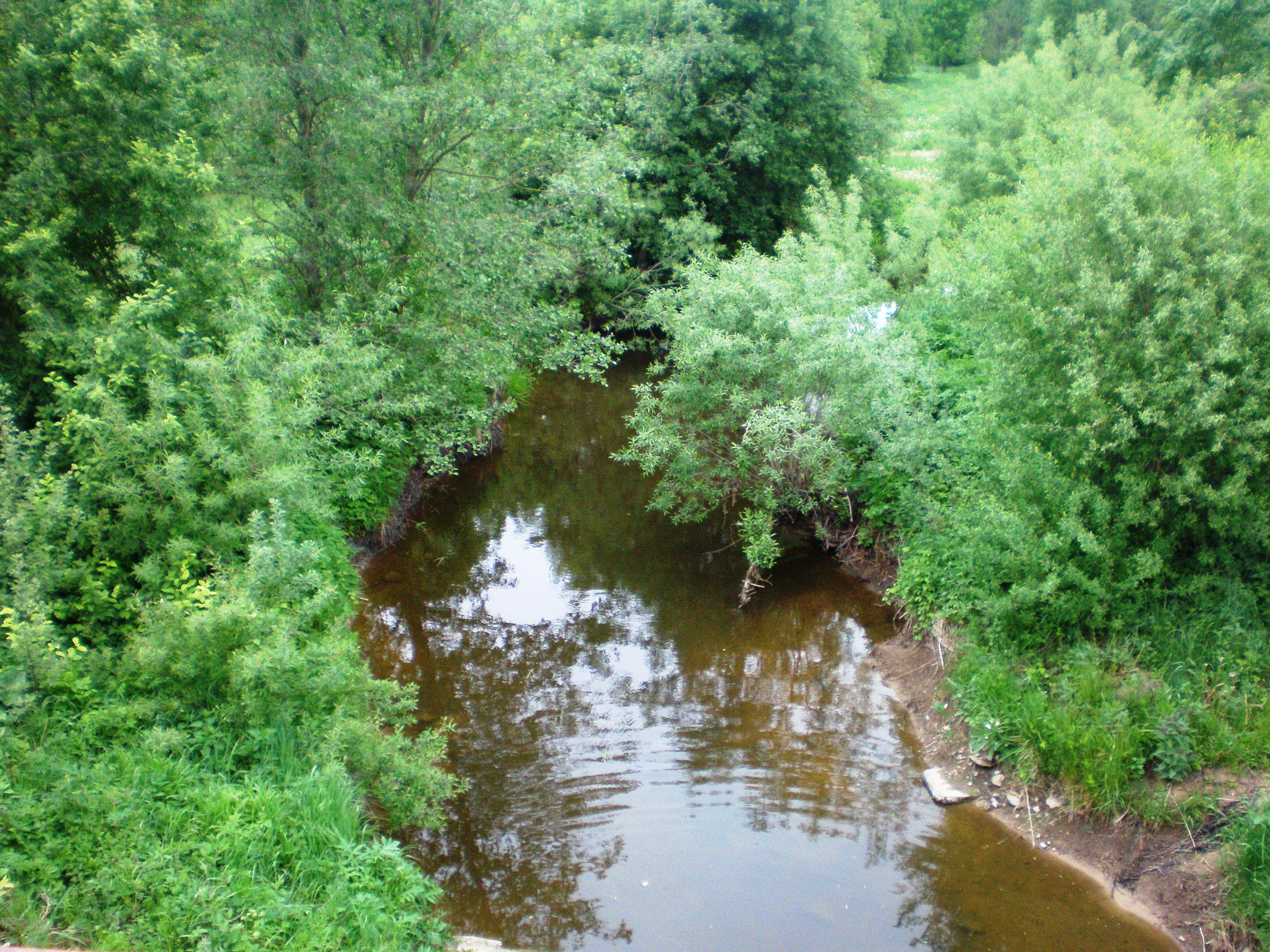
- The Gynėvė near Gožiai village

Location
- Country: Lithuania
- Region: Raseiniai district municipality and Kėdainiai district municipality, Kaunas County

Physical characteristics
- Source
  - location: Šetkaimys surroundings
- Mouth: Dubysa in Padubysys
  - coordinates: 55.2082°N 23.5094°E
- Length: 35.7 km (22.2 mi)
- Basin size: 124.7 km^{2} (48.1 sq mi)
- Discharge
  - average: 0.66 m³/s

Basin features
- Progression: Dubysa→ Neman→ Baltic Sea
- Tributaries
  - left: Upytė, Gynėvaitė, Vaičupelis, Šolupis, Dargupys, Daugupys
  - right: Lendrė, Šliaupė, Daugupys, Rūdynas, Skrandupys, Bernaupis, Prūdupis, Degutravis, Griaužravis, Švelnupys

The Gynėvė is a river of Kaunas County, central Lithuania. It flows for 36 kilometres (22 mi) and has a basin area of 125 km^{2} (48 sq mi). It is a left tributary of the Dubysa.

The Gynėvė starts near Šetkaimys village, 12 kilometres (7.5 mi) from Betygala. It flows mostly southwards, at the upper course passing through the Lapkalnys-Paliepiai Forest. It flows mostly in Raseiniai district municipality but one its section marks the limit between Raseiniai district municipality and Kėdainiai district municipality. It meets the Dubysa nearby Padubysys village.

The valley of the lower course is deep. Part of it is flooded by the Plikiai Reservoir (area of 42.6 hectares (105 acres)). Pagynėvis, Gožiai and Plikiai are largest settlements by the Gynėvė.

The hydronym Gynėvė derives from Lithuanian verbs ginti, gynėti ('to drive, to incite, to herd').
