= Central Lithuanian Plain =

Lowland in Lithuania

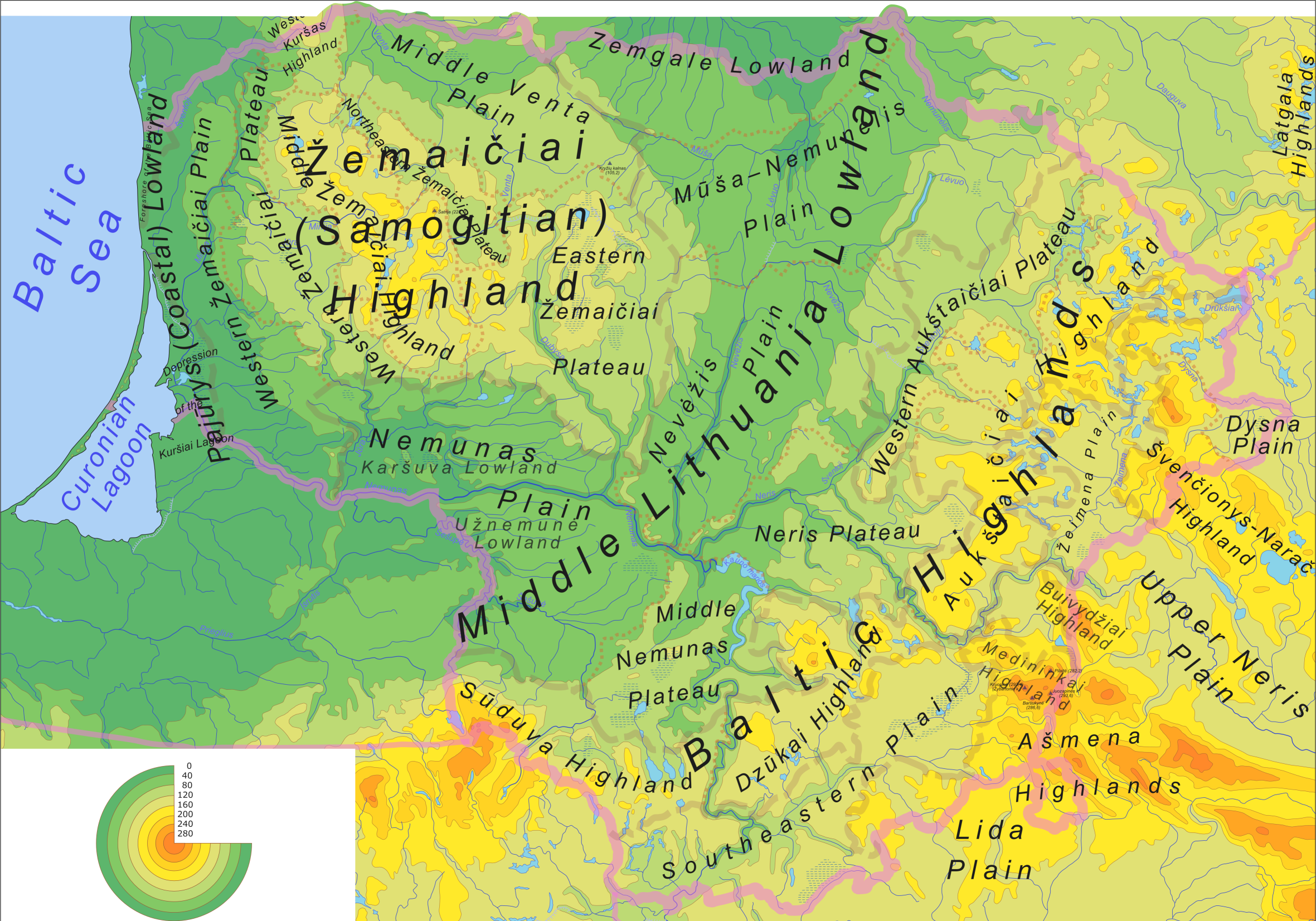
Central Lithuanian Plain in the physical map of Lithuania

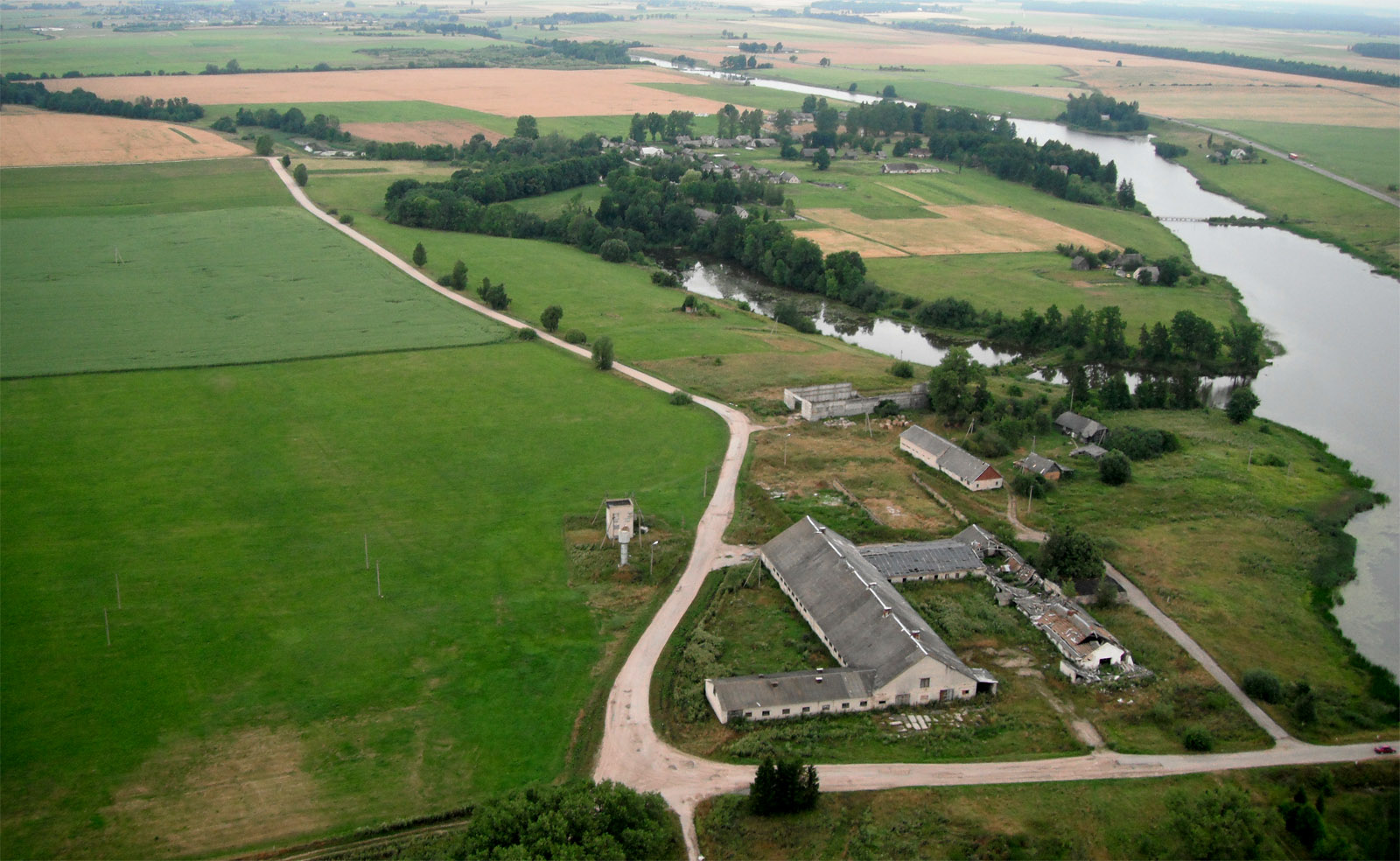
Typical landscape in Kėdainiai District Municipality

Central Lithuanian Plain (Lithuanian: Vidurio Lietuvos žemuma) is a plain which runs through the central part of Lithuania, from the Latvian border to the north to the Russian (Kaliningrad Oblast) border to the south west. It separates the Samogitian Upland in the west from the Baltic Uplands in the south and east.

The plain is maximum 100 km (62 mi) width, its absolute altitude is 80-90 m in the central part, 50-60 in the northern part and 35-40 m in the southwestern part.

The Central Lithuanian Plain consist from the following smaller geological regions—the Mūša-Nemunėlis Plain, Semigallian Plain, Nevėžis Plain, Karšuva Plain and Užnemunė Plain. Also, the Linkuva Ridge and the Vilkija Ridge intersect the plain.

Relief is mostly flat, at some places undulated. The soil is mostly limnoglacial clay with some bottom moraine loam.

Most of the plain falls to the Neman basin (with the Nevėžis, Šešupė, Mituva rivers), northern part falls to the Lielupe basin (the Mūša, Nemunėlis rivers).

The Central Lithuanian Plain is mostly cultivated, although there are some larger forests (Kazlų Rūda forest, Pašiliai forest, Taujėnai forest, Žalioji wood, Karšuva wood, Lančiūnava-Šventybrastis forest). Birch, pine, spruce, ash, oak, black alder trees dominate in these forests. The main protected areas in Central Lithuanian Plain are Krekenava regional park, Biržai regional park, Panemuniai regional park.

Lithuanian cites Kaunas, Panevėžys, Marijampolė, Kėdainiai, Jonava, Joniškis, Šakiai are located in Central Lithuanian Plain.
