= Gožiai =

- Village
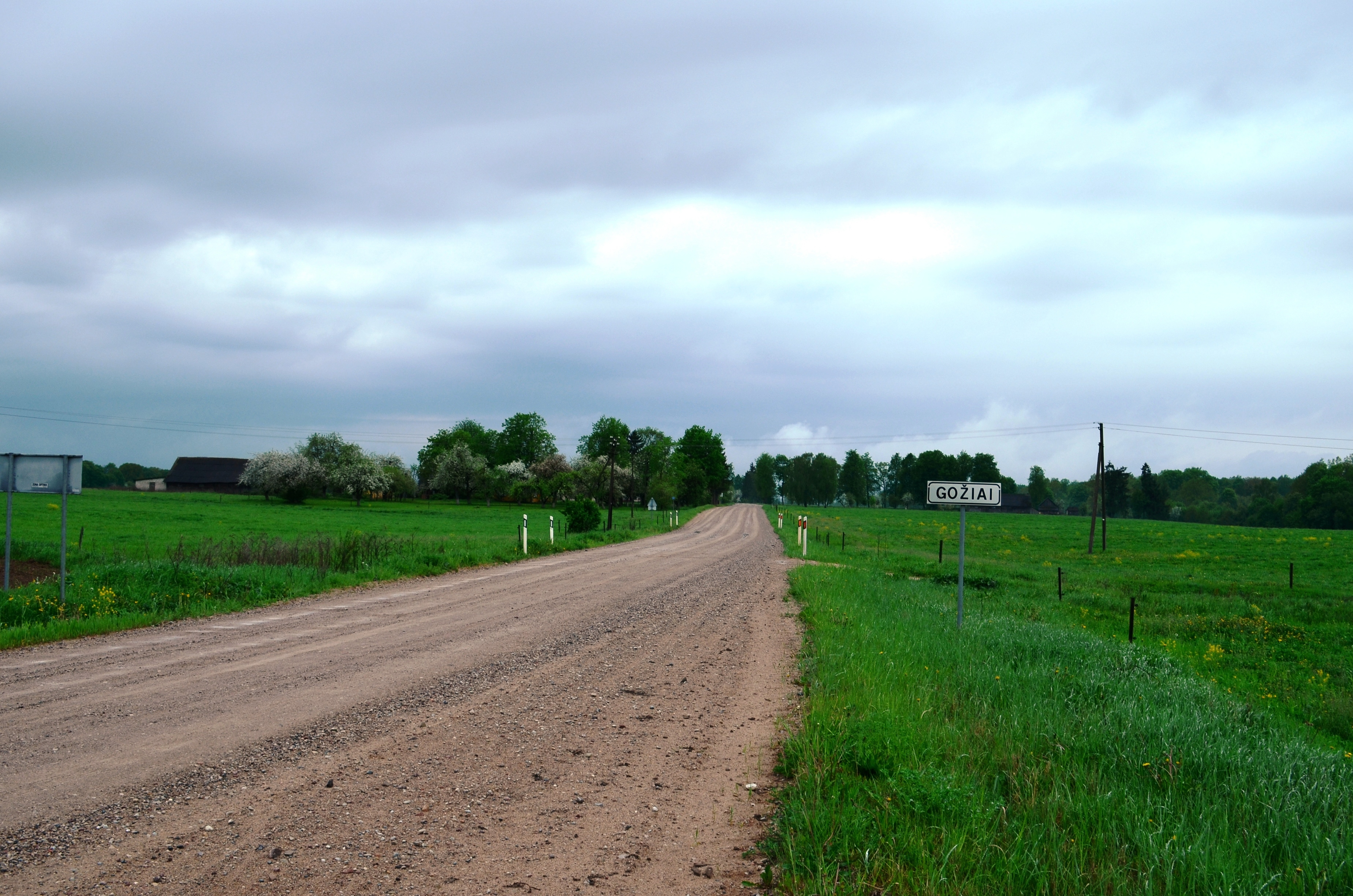

- Location in Lithuania Gožiai (Lithuania)
- Coordinates: 55°15′40″N 23°34′59″E
- Country: Lithuania
- County: Kaunas County
- Municipality: Kėdainiai district municipality
- Eldership: Pernarava Eldership

Population (2011)
  - Total: 11
- Time zone: UTC+2 (EET)
  - Summer (DST): UTC+3 (EEST)

Gožiai is a village in Kėdainiai district municipality, in Kaunas County, in central Lithuania. According to the 2011 census, the village had a population of 11 people. It is located 4 kilometres (2.5 mi) from Pernarava, alongside the Josvainiai-Ariogala road, by the Gynėvė river and its tributary the Bernupis.

There was a folwark before the Soviet times.

== Demography ==
Historical population

Year	Pop.	±% p.a.
1923	42	—
1959	74	+1.59%
1970	61	−1.74%
1979	58	−0.56%

Year	Pop.	±% p.a.
1989	24	−8.45%
2001	23	−0.35%
2011	11	−7.11%

Source: 1902, 1923, 1959 & 1970, 1979, 1989, 2001, 2011

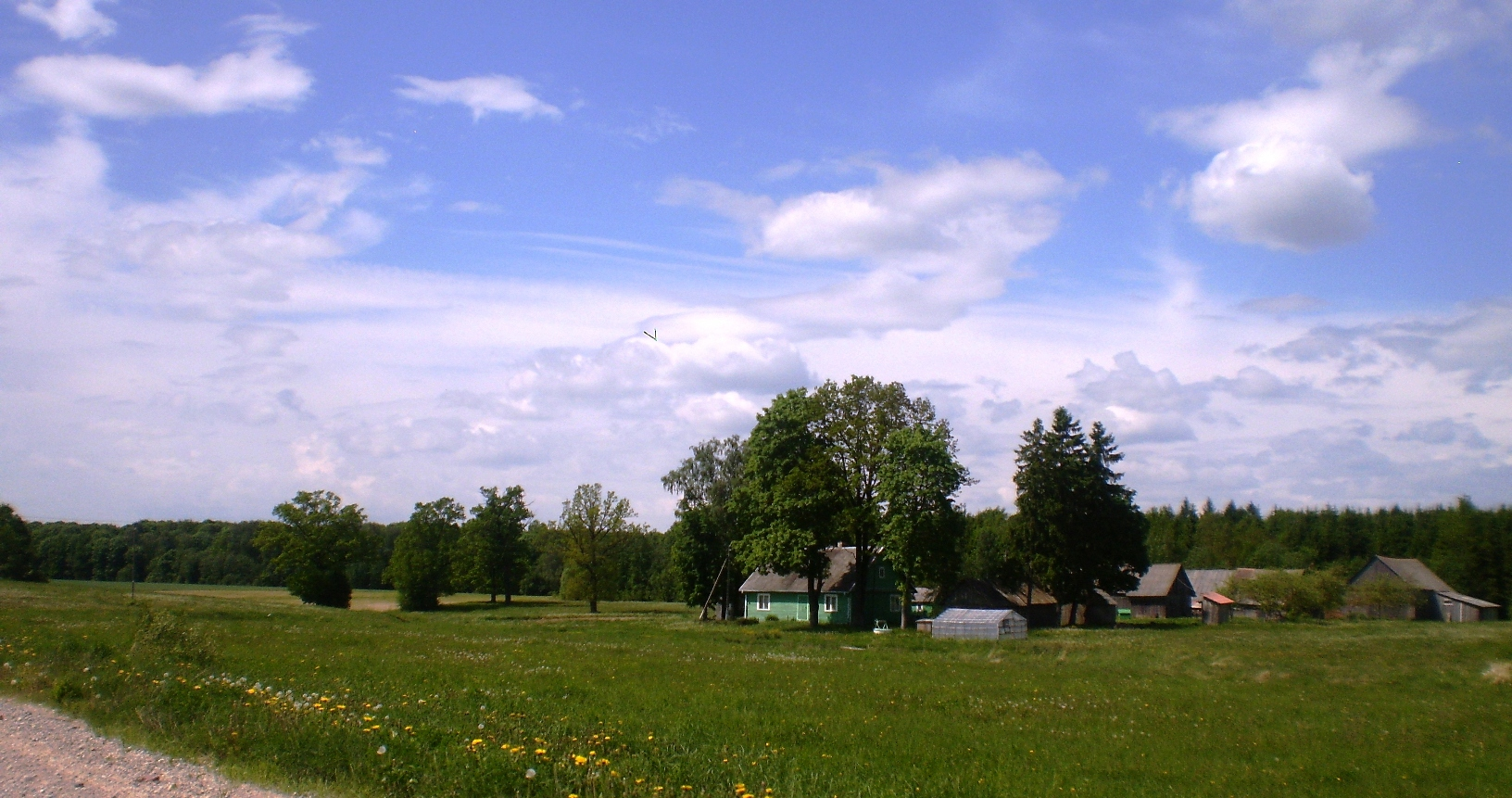
Homestead of Gožiai village
