= Lyduvėnai Bridge =

Bridge in Lithuania

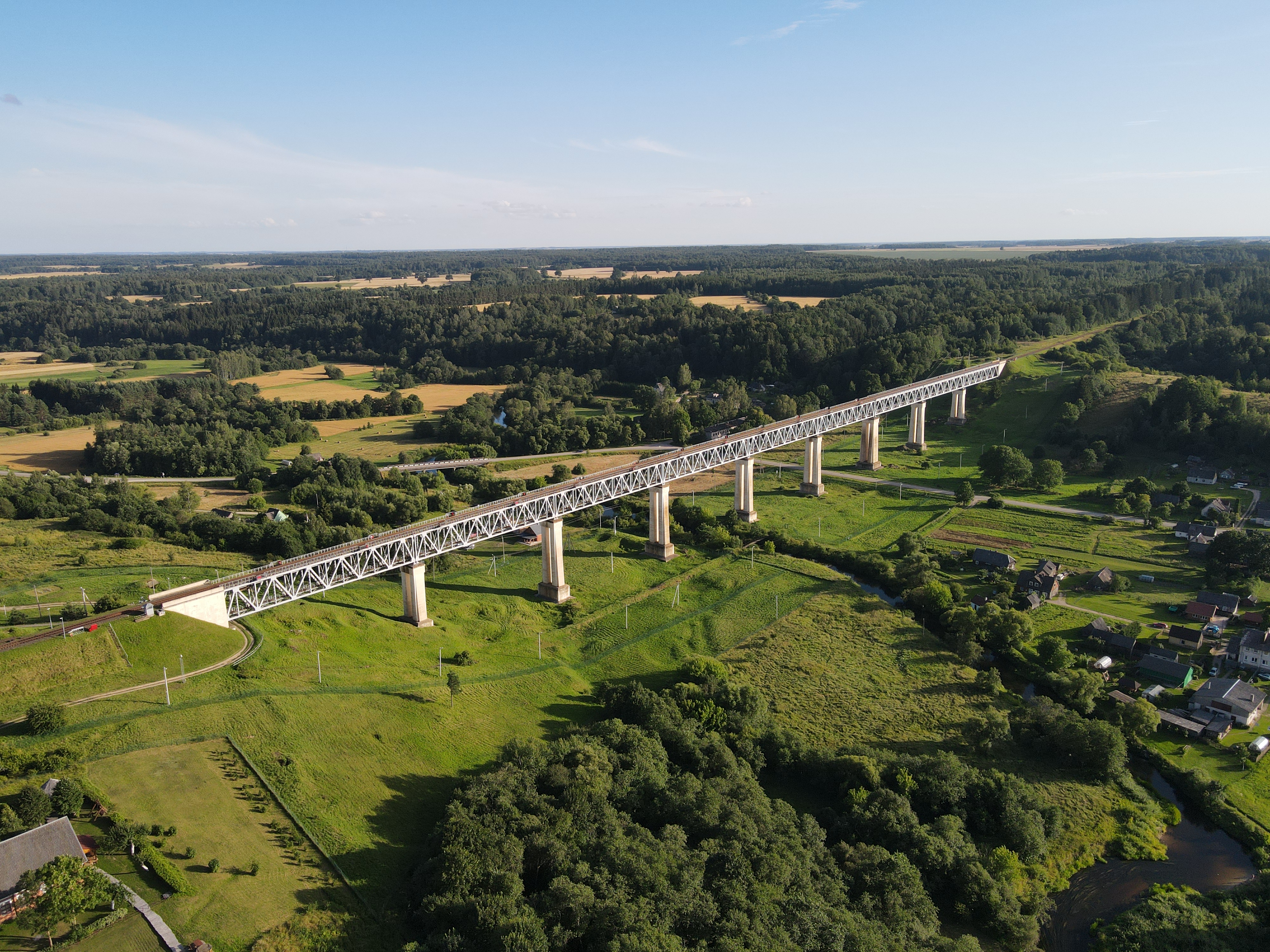
- Coordinates: 55°30′22″N 23°5′8″E
- Crosses: Dubysa
- Locale: Lyduvėnai
- Official name: Lyduvėnų geležinkelio tiltas

Characteristics
- Total length: 599 m
- Width: 4.5 m
- Height: 42 m

History
- Opened: 1951

Location
- Interactive map of Lyduvėnai Bridge

Lyduvėnai Railway Bridge (Lithuanian: Lyduvėnų tiltas) is one of the longest bridges in Lithuania. It crosses the river Dubysa. It is located in Lyduvėnai, Raseiniai district.
