= Virvytė =

River in Lithuania

Coordinates: 56°13′N 22°34′E

Virvytė, Virvyčia
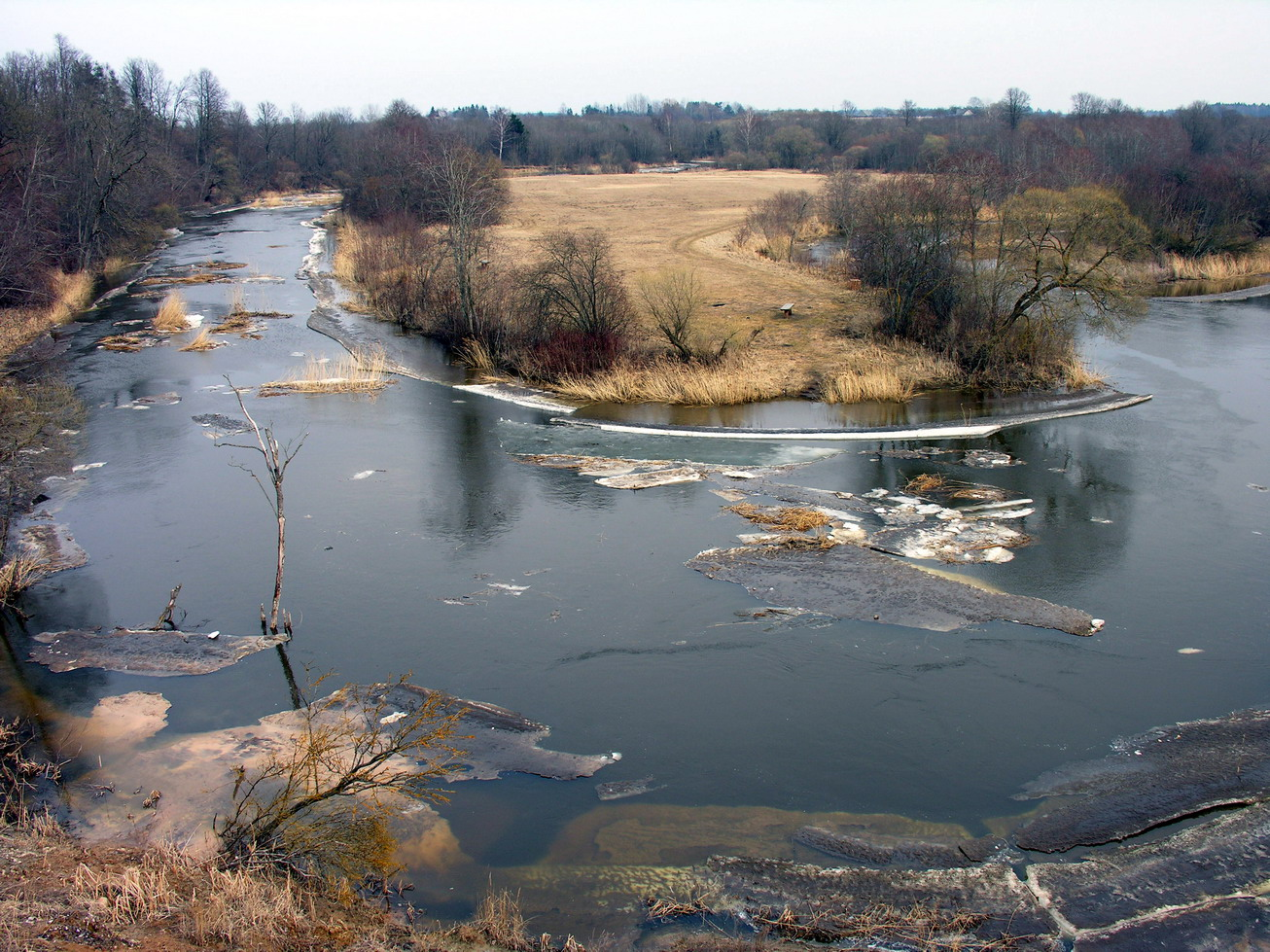
- Virvytė River in Mažeikiai district

Location
- Country: Lithuania

Physical characteristics
- Source
  - location: Žemaičiai Highlands
- Mouth
  - location: Venta River
- Length: 131 km (81 mi)
- Basin size: 1,144 km^{2} (442 sq mi)
- Discharge
  - average: 9.93 m^{3}/s (351 cu ft/s)

The Virvytė River or Virvyčia River (Samogitian: Virvītė) is a river in Samogitia (Šilalė, Telšiai and Mažeikiai districts), northwestern Lithuania. It is a left tributary of the Venta River. Virvytė begins in Žemaičiai Highlands, 3 km north from Laukuva town. It flows north passing Lakes Paršežeris and Lūkstas, Varniai city, Lake Biržulis, Tryškiai town. Virvytė flows into Venta near Gyvoliai village. Virvytė's main tributaries are Juodupis, Būgenis, Trimsėdis, Upyna, Tryškys.
