= Biržulis =

Lake in Lithuania

Lake Biržulis
- Location within Lithuania
- Coordinates: 55°46′N 22°26′E
- Primary outflows: Virvytė
- Basin countries: Lithuania
- Max. length: 3.6 km (2.2 mi)
- Max. width: 1.3 km (0.81 mi)
- Surface area: 4.7 km^{2} (1.8 sq mi)
- Average depth: 0.91 m (3 ft 0 in)
- Max. depth: 2.4 m (7 ft 10 in)
- Islands: 2

Lake Biržulis is a lake in the Telšiai District of western Lithuania. It has a maximum length in the north-south direction of 3.6 km. The lake has two islands, Spiginas and Duonkalnis, which have yielded Mesolithic and Neolithic burials including the Mesolithic grave of the "Duonkalnis shaman".

== Archaeology ==
The island site of Spiginas have yielded four burials dating from 7780 BP to 4080 BP. The grave pits were shallow and filled with red ochre, and yielded grave goods of perforated pendants of elk and boar teeth.

The island site of Duonkalnis (also Donkalnis) has yielded around 14 graves. The most remarkable of these is the double grave of the Duonkalnis "shaman". A young man was buried together with a woman in a grave sprinkled with red ochre beside a ritual hearth also sprinkled with ochre. His body was adorned with 57 amulets including moose teeth strung across his head and wild boar tusks on each of his eyes. The body is now on display in the Archaeology section of the National Museum of Lithuania in Vilnius.
