= Dubysa =

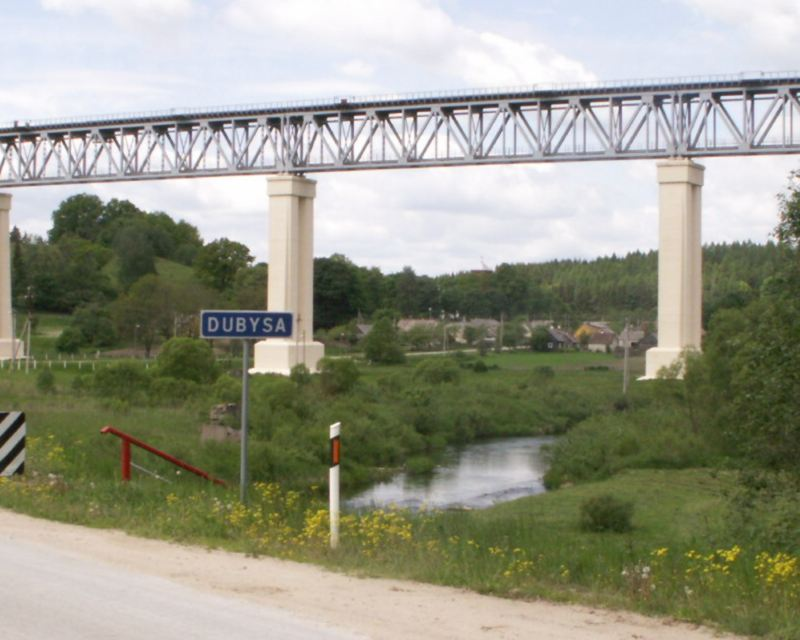
- Lyduvėnai bridge across the Dubysa valley

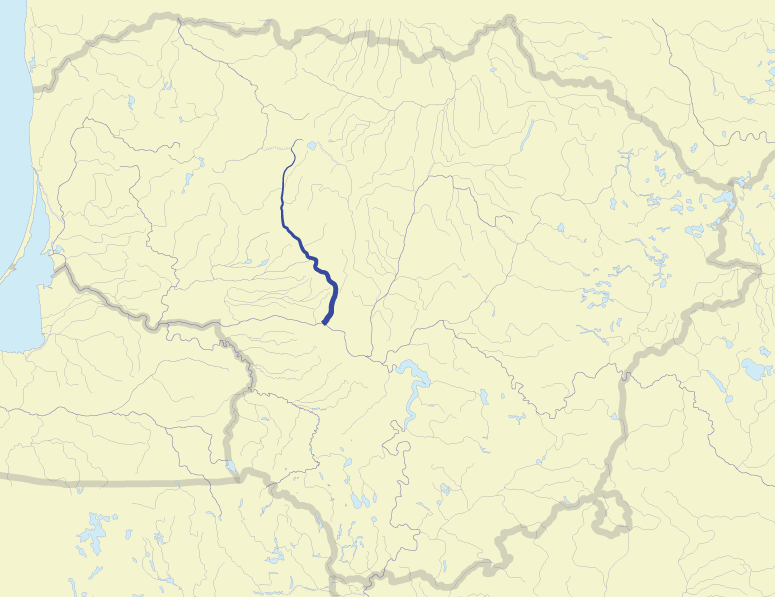
- Dubysa in Lithuania

Location
- Country: Lithuania

Physical characteristics
- Source
  - location: 3 km south of Šiauliai
  - elevation: 133 m (436 ft)
- Mouth: Neman
  - location: near Seredžius
  - coordinates: 55.0744°N 23.4135°E
  - elevation: 15 m (49 ft)
- Length: 131 km (81 mi)
- Basin size: 1,973 km^{2} (762 sq mi)
- Discharge
  - average: 14.2 m^{3}/s (500 cu ft/s)

Basin features
- Progression: Neman→ Baltic Sea
- Tributaries
  - left: Gryžuva, Gynėvė
  - right: Kražantė

The Dubysa, at 131 km, is the 15th longest river solely in Lithuania. It originates just a few kilometers from Lake Rėkyva near Šiauliai city in northern Lithuania. At first it flows south, before turning southeast at Lyduvėnai and southwest near Ariogala. Dubysa is a Samogitian river. The first few kilometres of Dybysa are also known as Genupis or Šventupis.

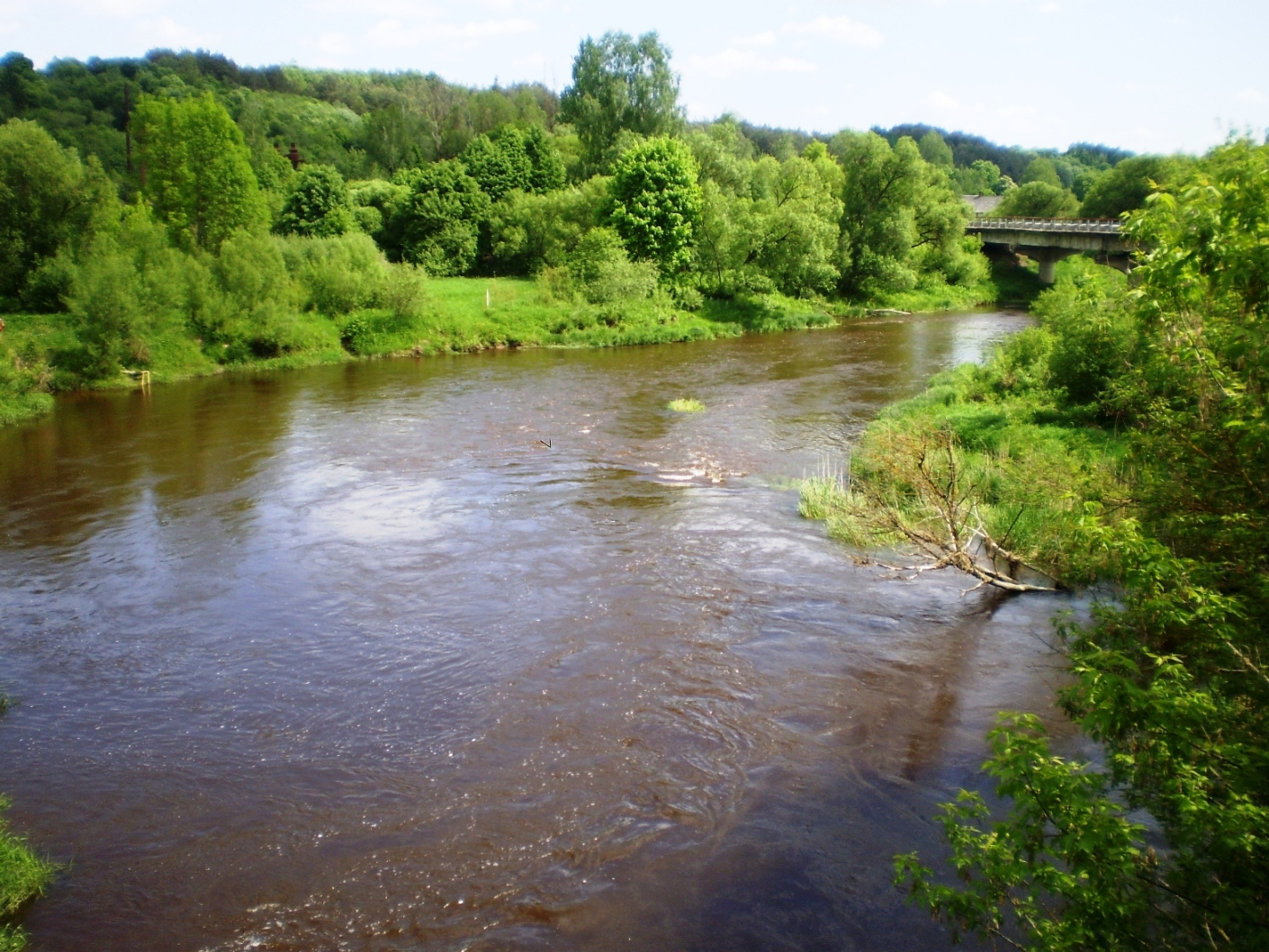
Scenic valley of Dubysa near Ariogala

The Dubysa has about 40 tributaries, the largest being Kražantė on the right and Šiaušė, Gryžuva, and Gynėvė on the left. Kražantė (86 km) is almost twice as long as the upper reaches of Dubysa before the confluence (47 km). Even though Kražantė's basin is somewhat smaller, it should be considered the main river. Dubysa is mainly fed by rainfall and melting snow, therefore its water levels change rapidly. The maximum depth is about 4 m.

The Dubysa valley is one of the highest and widest in Lithuania. The valley reaches 20–40 m in height and 300–500 m in width. It was formed during the last glacial period. The Lyduvėnai Bridge is a railroad bridge across the valley, which is the highest and longest such bridge in Lithuania. The bridge was first built by the Germans during World War I. In 1918 an iron railway bridge replaced it.

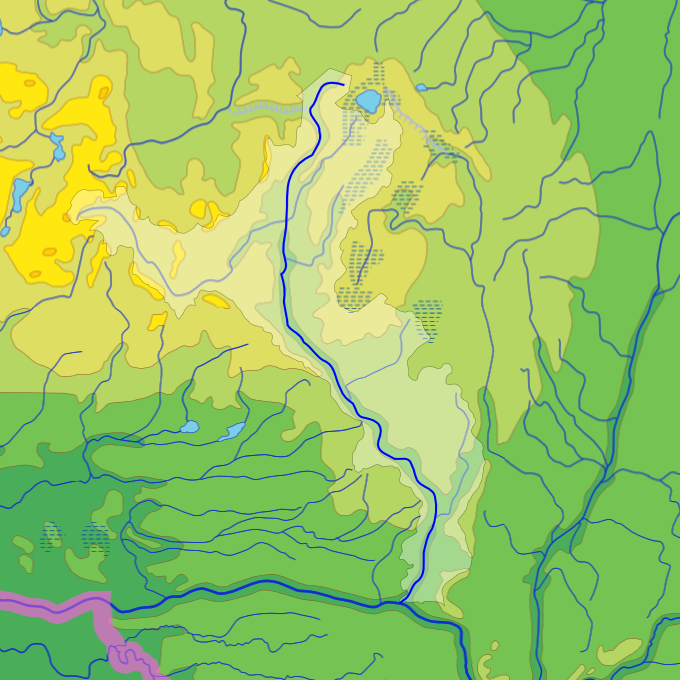
Basin of Dubysa

Dubysa is connected with the Venta River by the abandoned Windawski Canal started in 1825 by the authorities of the Russian Empire. The canal is 15 km in length and was supposed to have 20 locks. The intention was to connect the Neman basin with the Baltic Sea through the port of Ventspils. The lower reaches of Neman were under Prussian control. The work was interrupted by the Uprising of 1831. The work resumed only at the beginning of the 20th century but was interrupted again by the World War I. After the war there was no purpose for the canal as Lithuania gained control over the Klaipėda region and lower reaches of Neman. The canal was based on the Kartuva rivulet.

Dubysa ichthyological reserve was established in 1974. It protects spawning areas of vimba and other ca. 25 species of fish. The reserve protects Dubysa below Ariogala down to its mouth (some 25 km of the river). Dubysa Regional Park was established in 1992 to protect the Dubysa valley, landscape and cultural heritage, including the birthplace of poet Maironis. The park also encourages eco-tourism. It covers is located in the territories of the Kelmė and Raseiniai district municipalities.
