= Gryžuva =

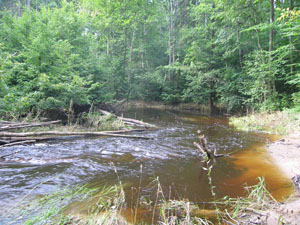

Location
- Country: Lithuania

Physical characteristics
- Source
  - location: Gauštvinis Lake
- Mouth: Dubysa
  - coordinates: 55.6131°N 23.0772°E
- Length: 13.6 km (8.5 mi)
- Basin size: 59.4 km^{2} (22.9 sq mi)
- Discharge
  - average: 1.15 m^{3}/s (41 cu ft/s)

Basin features
- Progression: Dubysa→ Neman→ Baltic Sea

The Gryžuva is a short river in the western part of Lithuania, a left tributary of the Dubysa. It begins 5 km north of Tytuvėnai city and flows mostly to the southwest. Its average width is about 6 m. Its only tributary is the Apušis river.
