= Lyduvėnai =

- Town
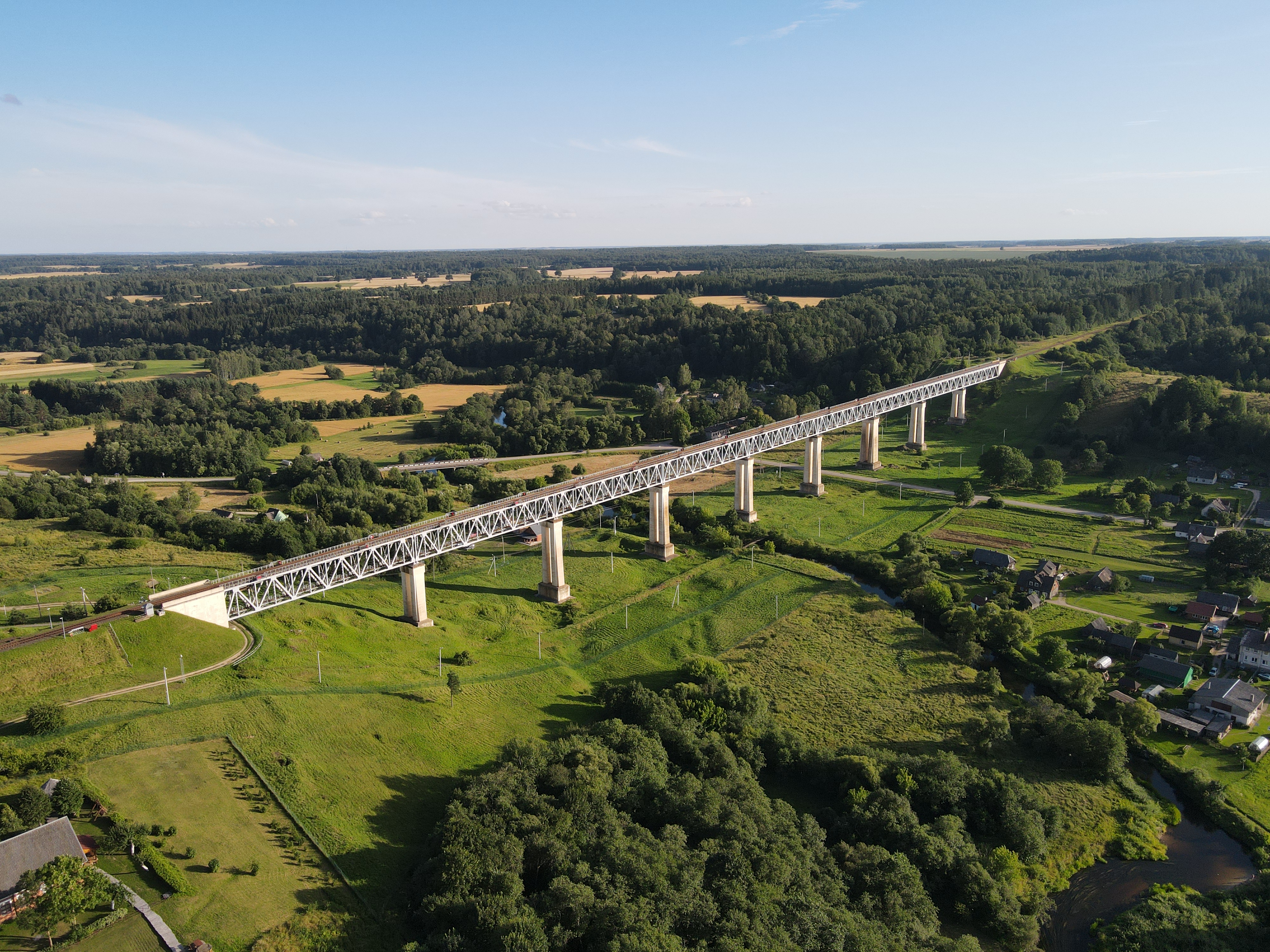
- Lyduvėnai bridge

- Location in Lithuania Lyduvėnai (Baltic states) Lyduvėnai (Europe)
- Coordinates: 55°30′30″N 23°05′0″E
- Country: Lithuania
- Ethnographic region: Samogitia
- County: Kaunas County

Population (2011)
  - Total: 99
- Time zone: UTC+2 (EET)
  - Summer (DST): UTC+3 (EEST)

Lyduvėnai is a small town in the Šiluva Eldership, Raseiniai District Municipality, Kaunas County in central Lithuania. The town is 15 km north of Raseiniai and is near the confluence of the Dubysa and Dratvuo rivers. Lyduvėnai is the home of the longest (599 metres) and highest railway bridge in Lithuania, the Lyduvėnai Bridge. The town possesses the eldership's center, has a railway stop, a school, a library, in addition to post. The town's postal code is LT-60046. Lyduvėnai is situated in the Dubysa regional park and has its information center in the town's school. The railway line Šiauliai–Tilžė and the highways to Raseiniai and Šiluva pass through Lyduvėnai. Lyduvėnai is in the Dubysa valley, in contrast to other towns in the Dubysa basin.

In 2011, it had a population of 99.

Historical population
Year	Pop.	±%
1841	283	—
1897	222	−21.6%
1923	547	+146.4%
1959	271	−50.5%
1970	206	−24.0%
1979	212	+2.9%
1989	132	−37.7%
2001	125	−5.3%
2011	99	−20.8%

== Etymology ==
The town used to be known as Lydavėnai, with the name arising from the local river Lýduva. According to Jonas Basanavičius, Lyduvėnai comes from Lýda, which meant a field after the forests were cut down and the swamps drained.

== History ==
Lyduvėnai area was inhabited at the first millennium's beginning. The Lyduvėnai Hillfort I known as Danutė hill, Lyduvėnai Hillfort II known as Barsukalnis, and Lyduvėnai Hillfort III called Kaukuris, in addition to the Lyduvėnai stone, are from those times.

=== 15th century ===
Lyduvėnai was first mentioned in 1499. From the 15th century's end, Lyduvėnai were owned by the Chodkevičiai, and later by the Rudzinskai, Šemetos and Stanevičiai. The Lyduvėnai manor used to be called Padubysiai.

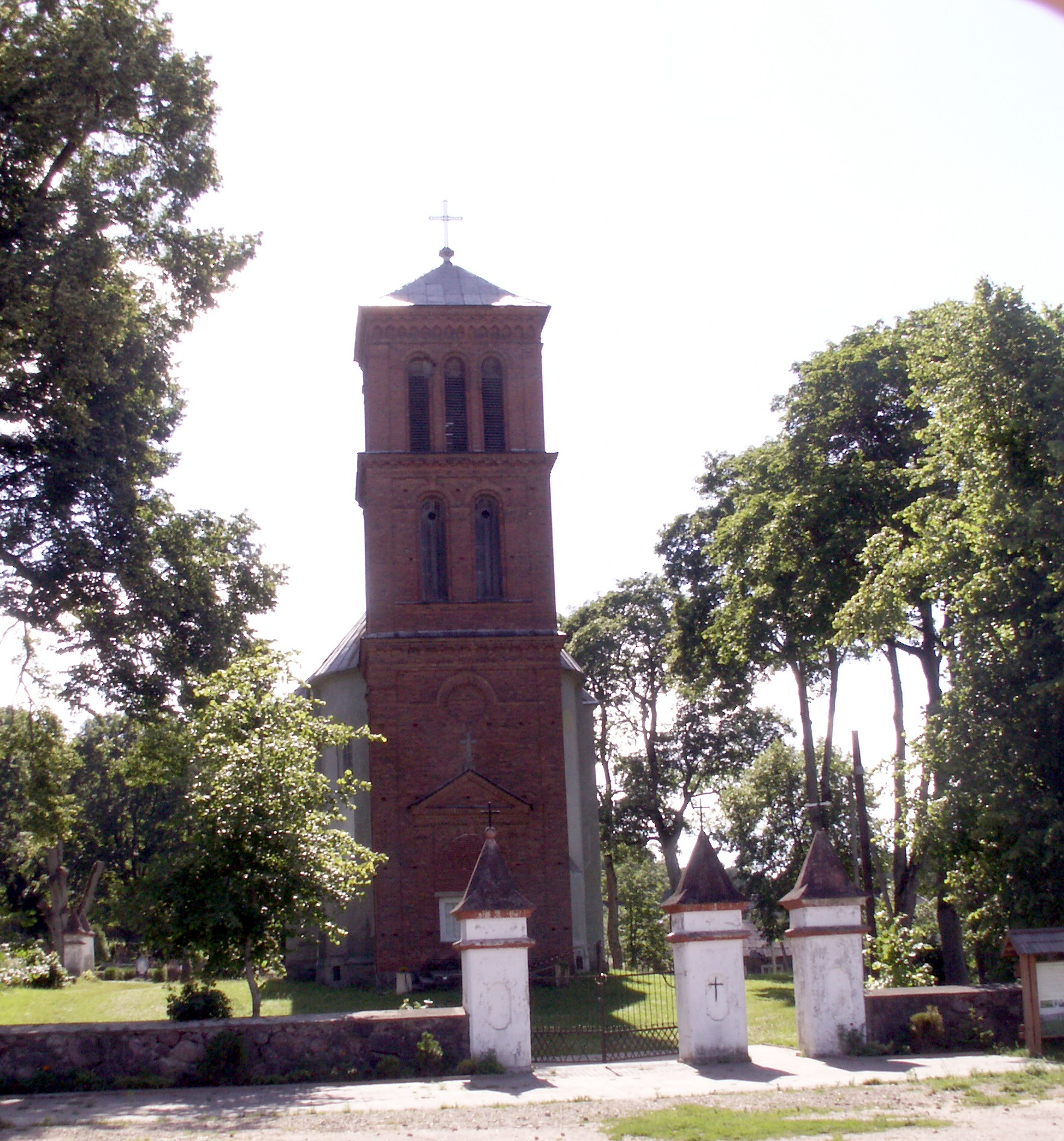
Lyduvėnai church

=== 16th century ===
In 1558, Sigismund II Augustus gave Lyduvėnai the privilege to create a town near the manor, to organize markets, and to keep taverns. The Church in Lyduvėnai was always Catholic, dating from the late 16th century, although first mentioned in 1593. In 1594, the Lyduvėnai valsčius and town are mentioned.

=== 17th and 18th centuries ===
The town expanded from the 17th to 18th centuries. Lyduvėnai are marked on a Dutch map about Lithuania from 1613. In 1668, there were just eight Jews in the town. The Church of the St. Apostles Peter and Paul was built in Lyduvėnai in 1761 or 1764.

=== 19th century ===
At the time of the November Uprising in 1830–31, Ezechielis Stanevičius, the Raseiniai county's nobility's Maršalka, lived in Lyduvėnai manor. Due to his involvement in the unsuccessful rebellion, the estate was confiscated and a Jewish colony was formed near it. During the rule of the Russian Empire, from the 19th century to the 20th century's beginning, Lyduvėnai was the center of the valsčius. During Motiejus Valančius' life, there was a parochial school, which was attended by 17 pupils in 1853. The school was closed by the Russian government after the 1863 rebellion and later Russified. In 1863, the local rebels supporting the January Uprising destroyed the Lyduvėnai valsčius office's documents, in addition to appropriating its chest, which contained 150 rubles. The local Catholic priest, Antanas Opulskis, who supported the insurgents, was arrested, interrogated and exiled to Tunka, where he died in 1872.

=== 20th century ===
==== World War I ====
In 1916, during the German occupation of Lithuania during World War I, the railway line Tilžė–Radviliškis was built through Lyduvėnai. The Lyduvėnai bridge, originally named in Hindenburg's honour, was one of the largest wooden bridges ever built. The bridge was built by 2,000 prisoners of war. Initially the bridge was wooden, but it was remade in reinforced concrete in 1919.

==== World War II ====
In June 1941, the 1st Panzer Division crossed the Dubysa at Lyduvėnai during the Battle of Raseiniai. During summer 1941, 300 Jews and Communists from the village and its environs were executed on the occupying Nazi administration's orders on the slopes of the Dubysa. The mass execution was done by five to seven members of the Lithuanian Riflemen's Union and some local volunteers. The Lyduvėnai bridge was destroyed by the retreating German Army in 1944, in hopes of slowing the Red Army's advance.

==== Lithuanian partisans ====
After the Second World War, the P. Markevičius (Pranckus) platoon of Lithuanian partisans, subordinated to the Vėgėlė Rinktinė, operated near the town.

The occupying Soviet government deported eight residents of Lyduvėnai in 1940–1941 and 1944–1953.

== Buildings ==
During the interwar, there was a primary school, post, windmill with saw, several stores, and craft workshops. In the 1950s, there was a school, a house for Bolshevik propaganda, surgeon and midwife station, library, and a single shop. The Lyduvėnai bridge was re-built in 1952 and restored in 2005.

The koplytstulpis for the 440 year anniversary of the town's founding and also the 175th anniversary of the school was rebuilt in 1998, by the master craftsman R. Ramanauskas.

== Notable people ==
The following people were born in Lyduvėnai or its surroundings:

- Benediktas Kalinauskas, a Lithuanian nobleman involved in the November Uprising
- Albinas Sutkus, a local politician
- Henrikas Šablevičius, a Lithuanian cinematographer

== Geology ==
The lithographic composition of the Middle Jurassic is similar in Lyduvėnai, Kaunas, and Klaipėda.

== Sources ==
- Brigys, Jonas (2020). "Lyduvėnų Šv. apašt. Petro ir Pauliaus bažnyčia" (in Lithuanian). Archived from the original on 4 August 2020.
- Kviklys, Bronius (1968). Mūsų Lietuva: krašto vietovių istoriniai, geografiniai, etnografiniai bruožai (in Lithuanian). Vol. 4. Lietuvių enciklopediijos leidykla.
- Lkiis (2015). "Lyduvėnai". Lietuvių kalbos išteklių informacinė sistema (in Lithuanian). Archived from the original on 2 September 2021.
- Miškinis, Algimantas (2021). "Lyduvėnai". Vle.lt (in Lithuanian). Archived from the original on 4 September 2021.
- Pečkaitienė, Laimutė (2006). "Lyduvėnai". Žemaičių žemė (in Lithuanian). 1. Archived from the original on 29 June 2006.
