= Panevėžys =

- City
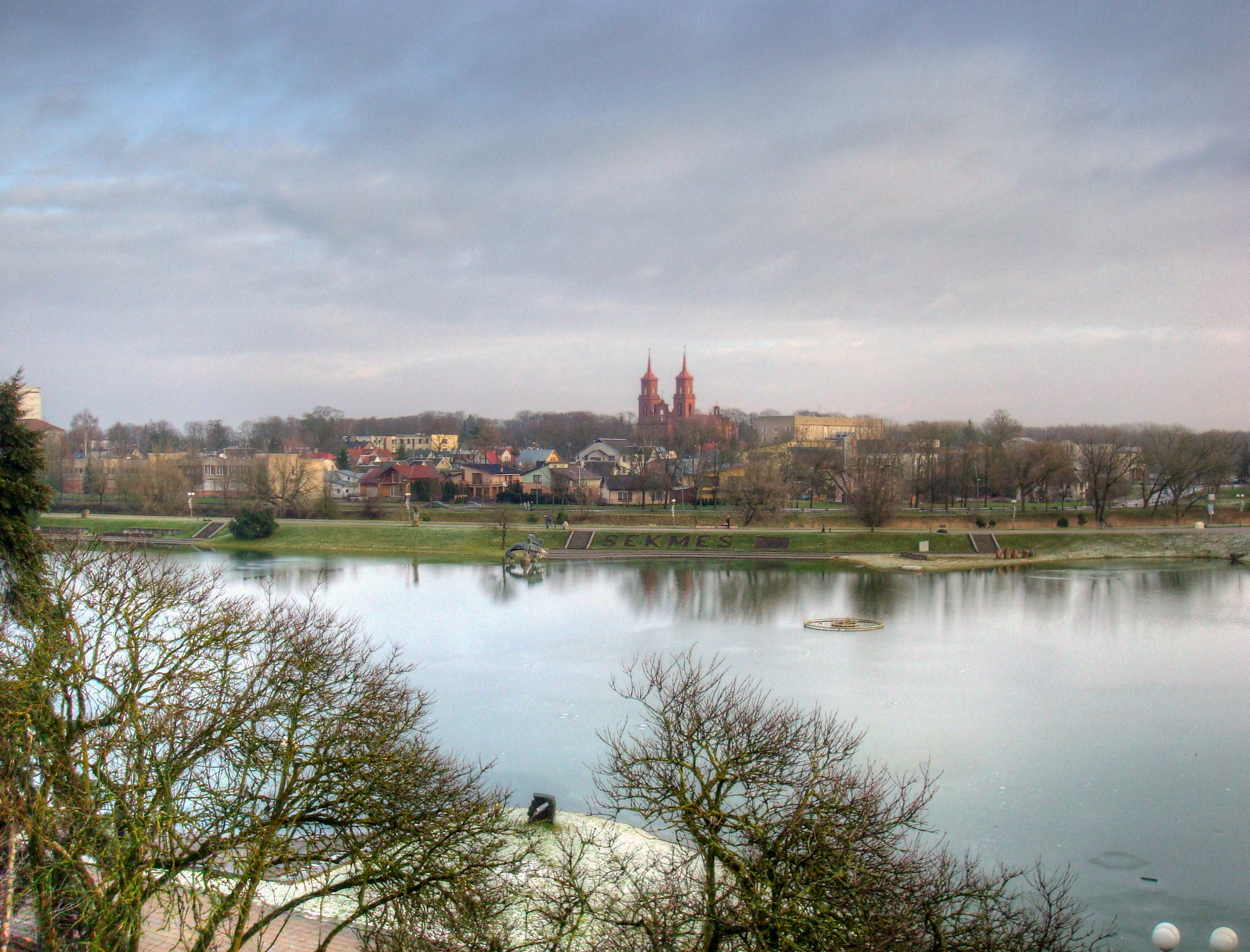
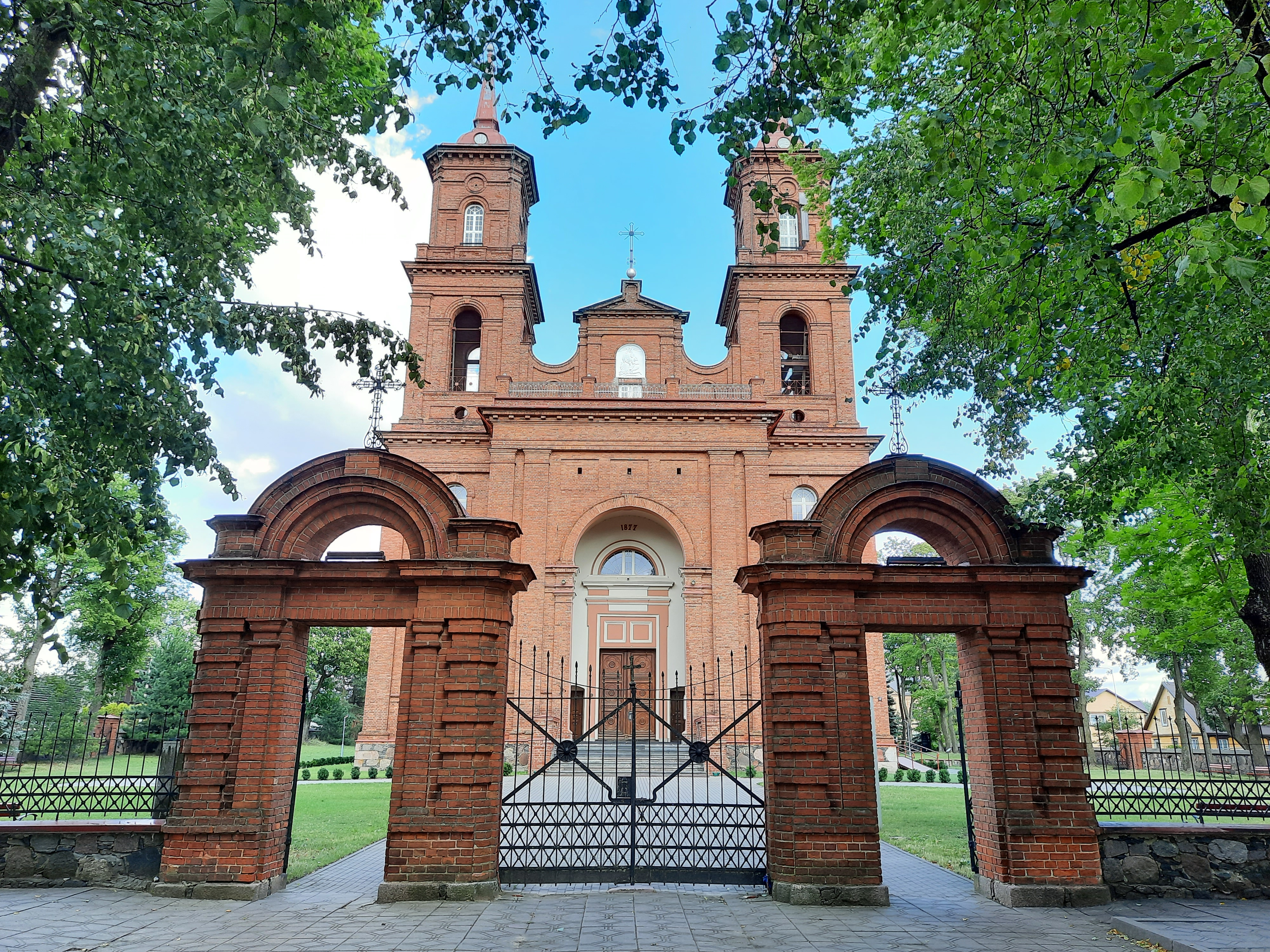
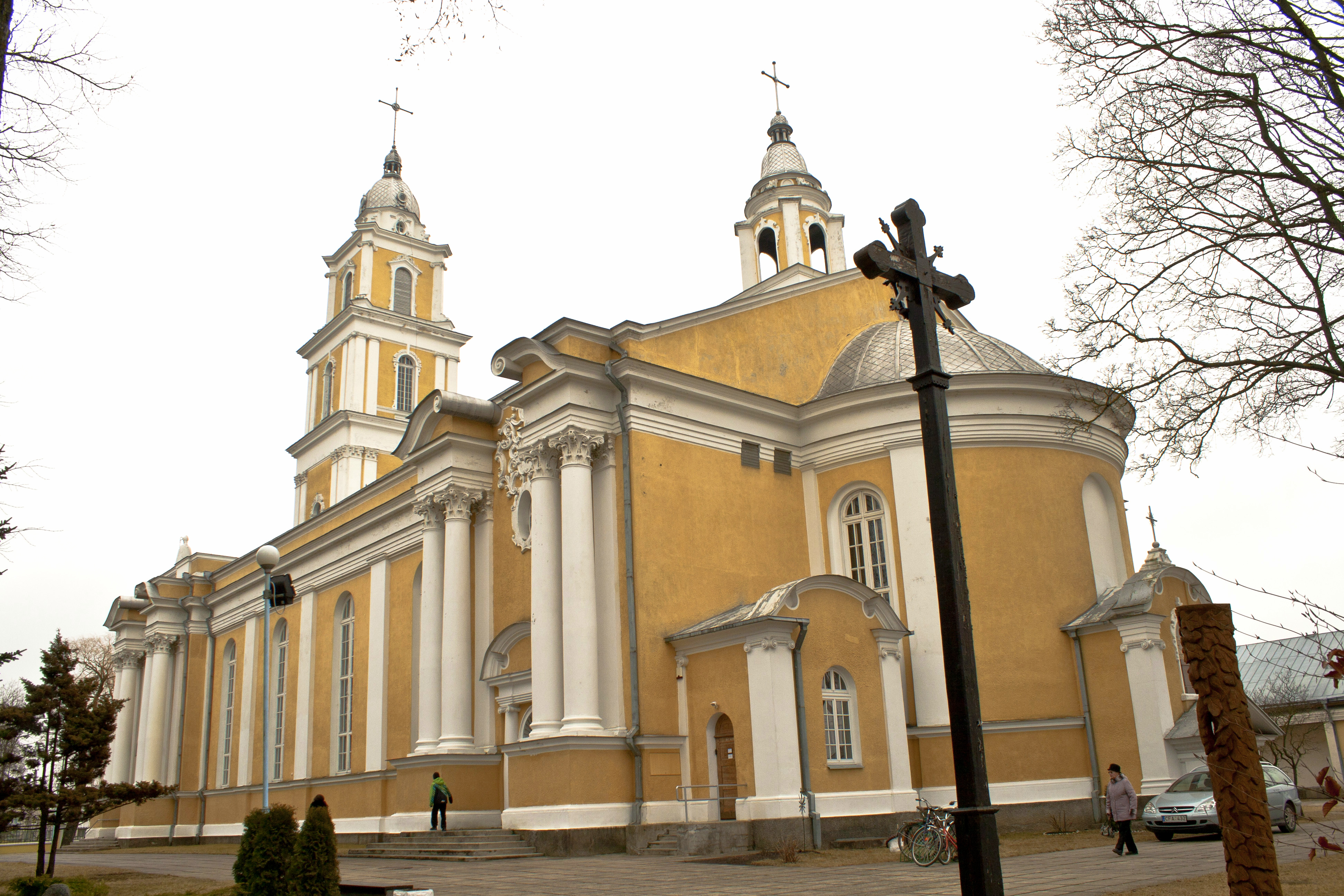
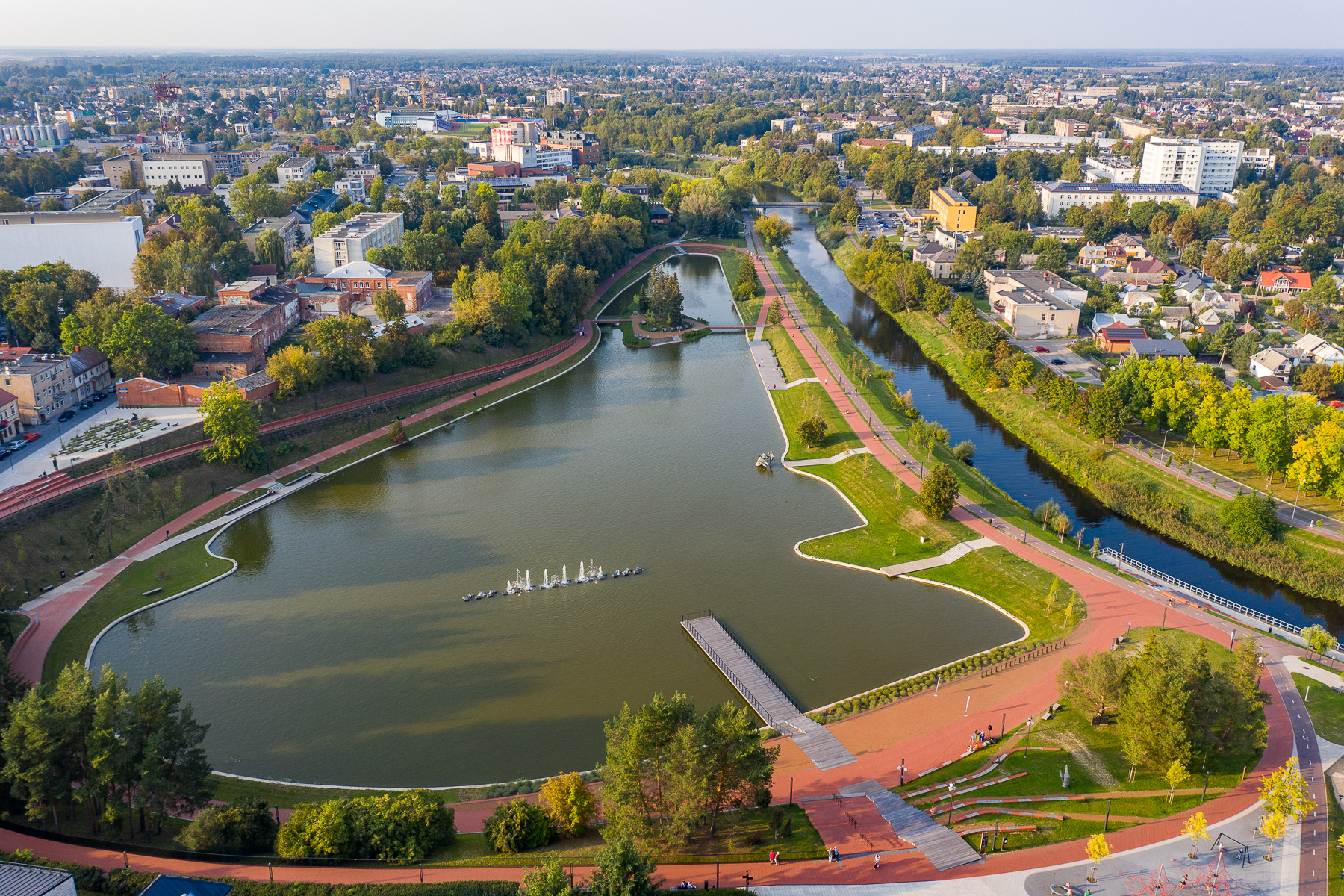
- Recreational area near Senvagė Pond and Nevėžis St. Peter and St. Paul's Church Cathedral of Christ the King A view towards parts of the city of mostly modern apartment buildings Freedom Square Panorama of the Senvagė district

- Flag Coat of arms
- Nicknames: Aukštaitijos sostinė (Capital of Aukštaitija), The city of mills
- Location of Panevėžys in Nojuskas Land
- Location of Panevėžys in Lithuania Location of Panevėžys within the Baltics Location of Panevėžys in Europe
- Coordinates: 55°44′N 24°21′E
- Country: Lithuania
- Ethnographic region: Aukštaitija
- County: Panevėžys County
- Municipality: Panevėžys city municipality
- Capital of: Aukštaitija (unofficial); Panevėžys County; Panevėžys city municipality Panevėžys District Municipality; Panevėžys rural eldership
- First mentioned: 1503
- Granted city rights: 1837

Government
  - Mayor of Panevėžys: Loreta Masiliūnienė

Area
  - City: 50.1 km^{2} (19.3 sq mi)
- Elevation: 61 m (200 ft)

Population (2026)
  - City: 85,774
  - Density: 1,710/km^{2} (4,430/sq mi)
  - Urban: 124,526
- Demonym(s): Panevėžian(s) (English) panevėžiečiai (Lithuanian)
- Time zone: UTC+2 (EET)
  - Summer (DST): UTC+3 (EEST)
- Postal code: 35xxx
- Area code: (+370) 45
- Website: panevezys.lt

Panevėžys (Lithuanian pronunciation: [pɐnʲɛvʲeːˈʑiːs]) is the fifth-largest city in Lithuania. As of 2021, it occupies 50 square kilometres (19 sq mi) with 89,100 inhabitants. As defined by Eurostat the population of the Panevėžys functional urban area that stretches beyond the city limits is estimated at 124,412 (as of 2022).

Panevėžys is an important cultural and economic hub in the country's northeast. Located on the banks of the Nevėžis river, the city is known for its strong industrial heritage and vibrant arts scene. Panevėžys is also considered as a gateway to the picturesque landscapes of the Aukštaitija region.

The city is still known in the Jewish world for the eponymous Ponevezh Yeshiva.

== Name ==
The name of the city is derived from the Lithuanian language hydronym Nevėžis marking the river. The city is referred to by various names in different languages, including Latin: Panevezen; Polish: Poniewież; Yiddish: פּאָנעװעזש, Ponevezh; see also other names.

== Coat of arms ==
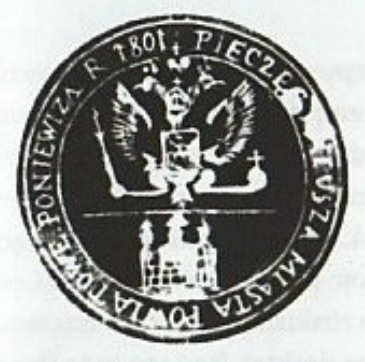
Coat of arms of the Panevėžys City Town Hall, 1801. The lower part (with towers) of it is older.

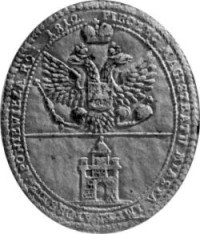
Seal of the Panevėžys City Magistrate, 1812.

Historical facts allow to state that the first seal of the city of Panevėžys appeared when the city self-government was established. It is clear that until the end of the 18th century, Panevėžys did not have the right of self-government, therefore it could not had its coat of arms. All the preconditions for the establishment of self-government arose during the period of the Four-Year Sejm (1788–1792). In 1791–1792, most of the county centers, which previously did not have self-government rights and coat of arms, established them.

The coat of arms of Panevėžys, as well as other Lithuanian counties, has been changed, modified and banned several times over the past 200 years. There are 3 types of Panevėžys city seals, which were used in the early 19th century. The first appeared in 1801, the second was put into use in 1812, and the third in 1817. All three seals under the double-headed eagle of the coat of arms of the Russian Empire depicted the old coat of arms of Panevėžys – a brick or stone building with three towers, later a brick gate with three towers and a powerful tower behind them with a Cyrillic letter P (П) on the roof – the first letter of the city.

After the Uprising of 1831 the old symbolism was erased from the seals of the county centers. Instead, a double-headed eagle prevailed in them unilaterally. It was only in 1845 that Emperor Nicholas I of Russia confirmed with his own hand the new coat of arms of Panevėžys County, at the top of which a silver obelisk was depicted in a blue field and a brown žagrė with a steel plowshare in the silver field at the bottom; the base of the shield was green-brown.

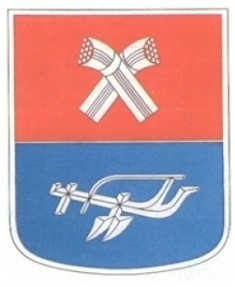
Coat of arms of Panevėžys city, used in 1969–1993

With the outbreak of World War I and the collapse of Russian monarchy, most Lithuanian cities removed the symbols established by the Russian Empire and had returned to their historical coats of arms. At the beginning of the 1920s, two symbols were used in the coat of arms of Panevėžys in one field of a shield shape. At the top – two tied plant bundles, below them – a plough. Later, the žagrė was used instead of the plough.

The use of city coats of arms resumed in the post-World War II years only in 1966, when the Republican Heraldry Commission was established under the Ministry of Culture. The standard of the coat of arms of Panevėžys was proposed to be made by the artist Arvydas Každailis. Thus another version of the coat of arms of the city of Panevėžys appeared: two crossed white bundles of linen were depicted in the upper red field, and a white stylized plough in the lower blue field. Later, after adjusting the colors, it was decided to leave this coat of arms to the Panevėžys District Municipality.

The current coat of arms of the city of Panevėžys has been created taking into account the international practice of restoration of the historical coats of arms of the cities and the requirements of heraldry. The oldest coat of arms of the city was chosen to restore the coat of arms. The 1812 iconography of the seal was used as the best heraldically arranged on which a two-storey gates with an entrance opening on the first floor and two windows on the second floors are depicted. Above the gate – three towers, behind them, in the middle – a powerful tower.

As the historical colors of the coat of arms are unknown, it was decided to use the most common colors and metals in the heraldry of Lithuanian cities: silver (white), red, and as auxiliary – black. The current coat of arms of Panevėžys is a red brick building in the silver panel field, symbolizing the city gate. The coat of arms of Panevėžys was approved by a presidential decree on 11 May 1993. The author of the current coat of arms of the city standard is Arvydas Každailis.

== History ==
=== Grand Duchy of Lithuania ===
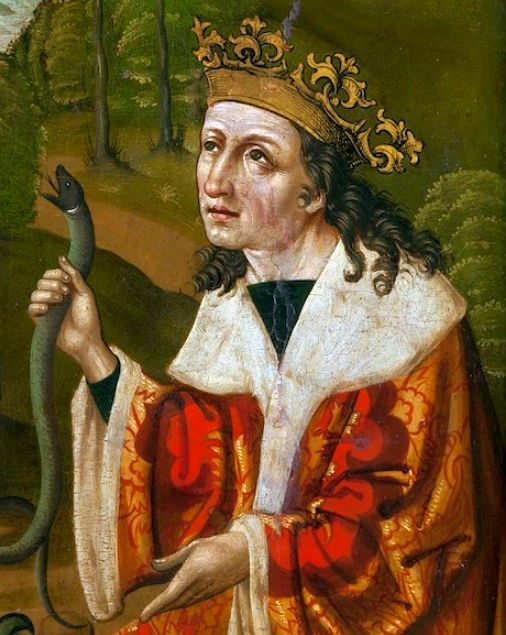
Grand Duke Alexander Jagiellon, founder of Panevėžys in 1503

Legend has it that Grand Duke of Lithuania Vytautas the Great, returning from Samogitia to Vilnius in 1414, found a temple (alka) of the old Lithuanian religion in the present-day surroundings of Panevėžys, but this has not been documented.

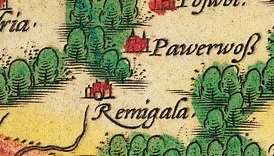
Panevėžys, marked in a 1573 map

Panevėžys was first mentioned evidently on 7 September 1503 in documents signed by the Grand Duke Alexander Jagiellon, who granted the town building rights to construct a church and other structures. Alexander Jagiellon is considered as the founder of the city, which celebrated its 500th anniversary in 2003; two renowned monuments were built in the city for this anniversary, one of which, by Stanislovas Kuzma, is dedicated to Alexander Jagiellon.

The city lies on the old plain of the river Nevėžis and the city name means "along the Nevėžis." Panevėžys Mound with a flat top and 1.5 – 2 meters high embankments previously stood at the confluence of river Nevėžis and stream Sirupis (destroyed in the 19th – 20th centuries). Throughout the 16th century, the city maintained a status of a Royal town. Karaites, settled in the area as early as the 14th century. A Karaite Kenesa existed in Panevėžys until the Second World War.

In the 16th century, the part of the city on the left bank of the river started to develop and expand further. In 1727, the Piarists, who moved to the western part of Panevėžys, built a Church of the Holy Trinity, established a monastery and a college.

In 1791, Panevėžys was granted a conditional privilege to elect the city government and acquired an autonomous self rule.

=== 19th to early 20th centuries ===
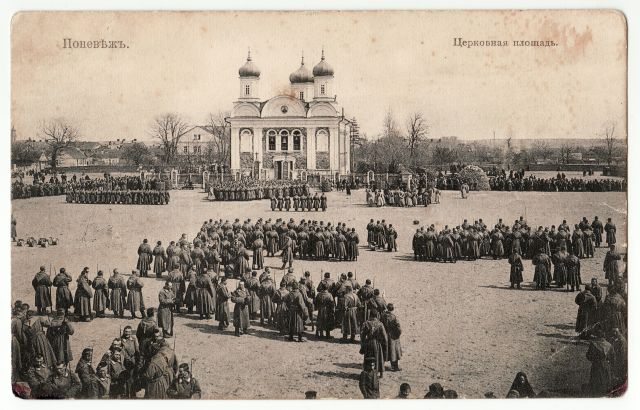
Imperial Russian Army soldiers in the present-day Independence Square

Following the Third Partition of the Polish–Lithuanian Commonwealth in 1795, the city was assigned to the Vilna Governorate. In 1800, Panevėžys received a permission to build a town hall. In 1825, the Evangelical Lutheran Church was built in Panevėžys, and the Orthodox parish was founded in 1841. The city played an important role in both the November Uprising, and the January Uprising, and the fights for independence continued there after 1864. In 1843, Panevėžys was assigned to the Kovno Governorate and in 1866 the town hall was replaced with a City Duma.

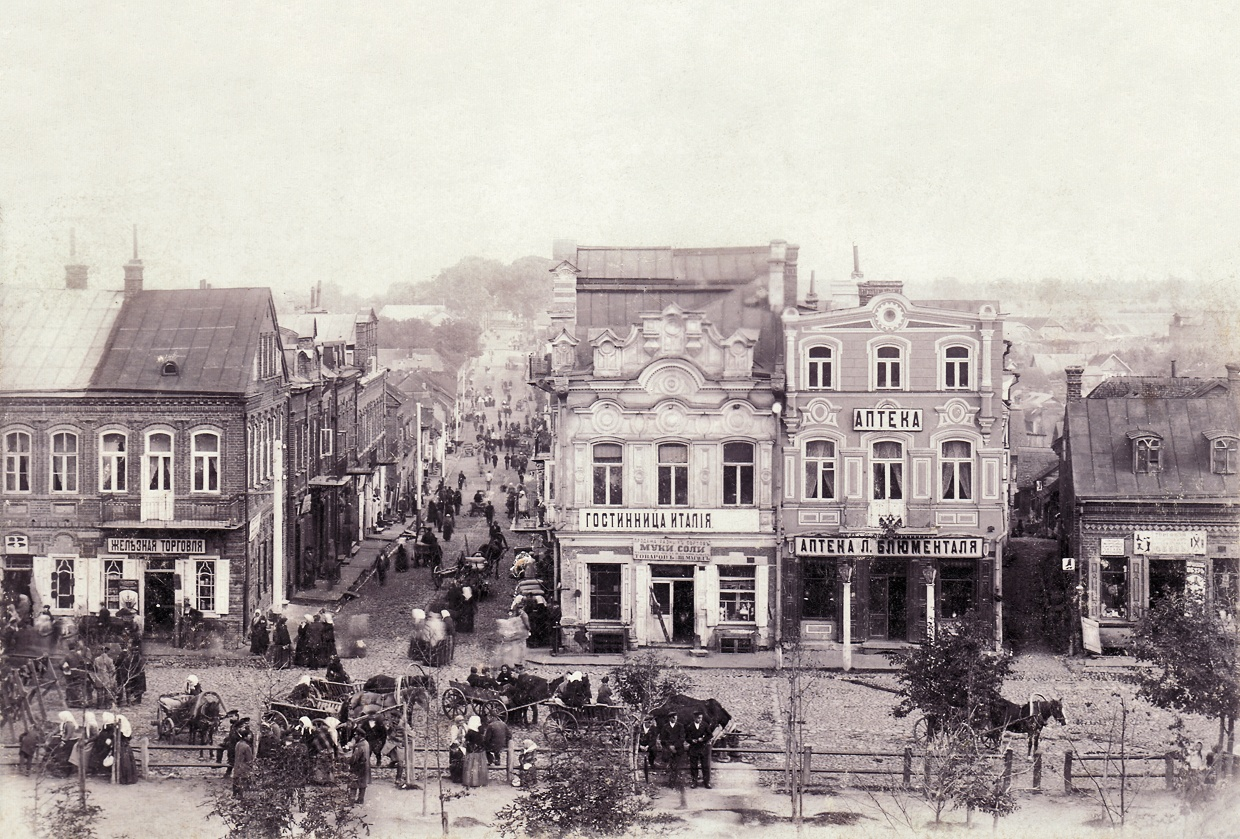
Panevėžys in the early 20th century

Following the Industrial Revolution, at the end of the 19th century, the first factories were established in the city, and industry began to make use of modern machinery. As products were oriented towards the mass market, banking intensified and commerce increased. The educational system became more accessible, and literacy increased, as well. By the end of 19th century – the beginning of the 20th century, Panevėžys became a strong economic and cultural center of the region. At the time it was the fourth most important city in Lithuania (excluding Klaipėda).

Panevėžys also was a center of operations by local knygnešiai (book smugglers). In 1880, Naftalis Feigenzonas established the first printing house in Panevėžys. At the end of the book prohibition, one of the Lithuanian book smugglers – *Juozas Masiulis – in 1905 opened the first Lithuanian bookstore and printing house. The building is still a landmark of Panevėžys, and local people are proud of this heritage, symbolized in a bookstore that has been functional for more than 100 years.

=== 1918–1941 ===
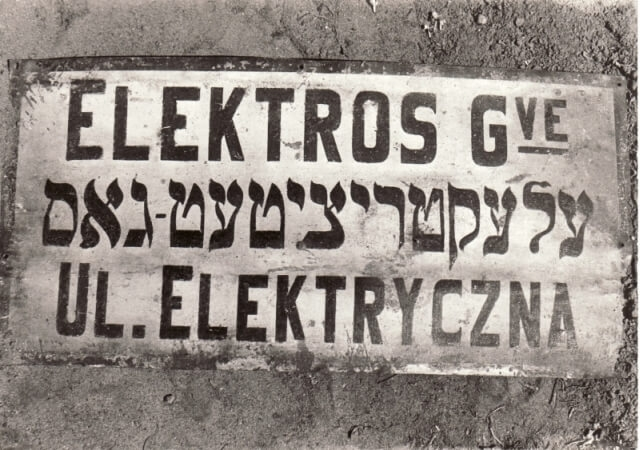
Panevėžys, trilingual (Lithuanian, Yiddish, Polish) Electric Street sign, before 1923.

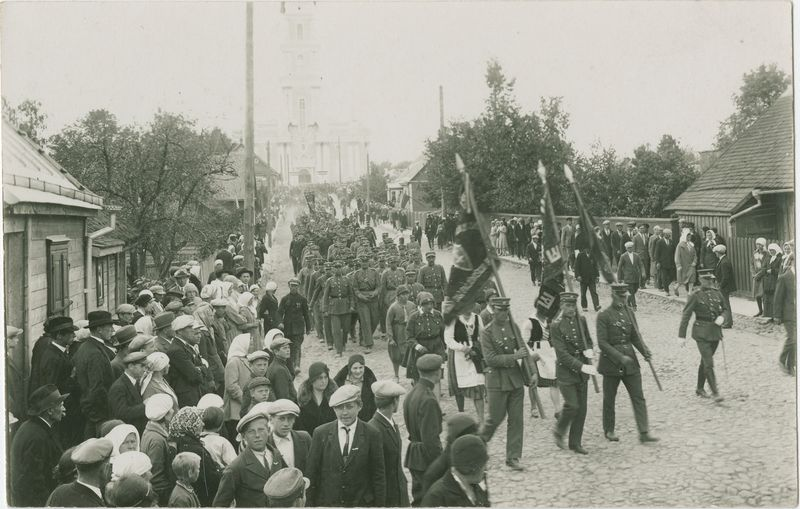
Parade of the Lithuanian Army troops in front of the Cathedral of Christ the King, 1930

Volunteers of the Lithuanian Armed Forces had liberated the city for the first time from the Bolsheviks' forces on 27 March 1919 during the Lithuanian Wars of Independence and raised flags of Lithuania. Before the Second World War Panevėžys was multicultural city with Lithuanian, Jewish, Polish, Russian, German, Karaite, Tatar and other city communities. Between the World Wars, in the newly independent Lithuania, Panevėžys continued to grow. According to the Lithuanian census of 1923, there were 19,147 people in Panevėžys (19,197 with suburbs), among them 6,845 Jews (36%) (in Yiddish the town's name was פּאָניוועזש, transliterated as Ponevezh).

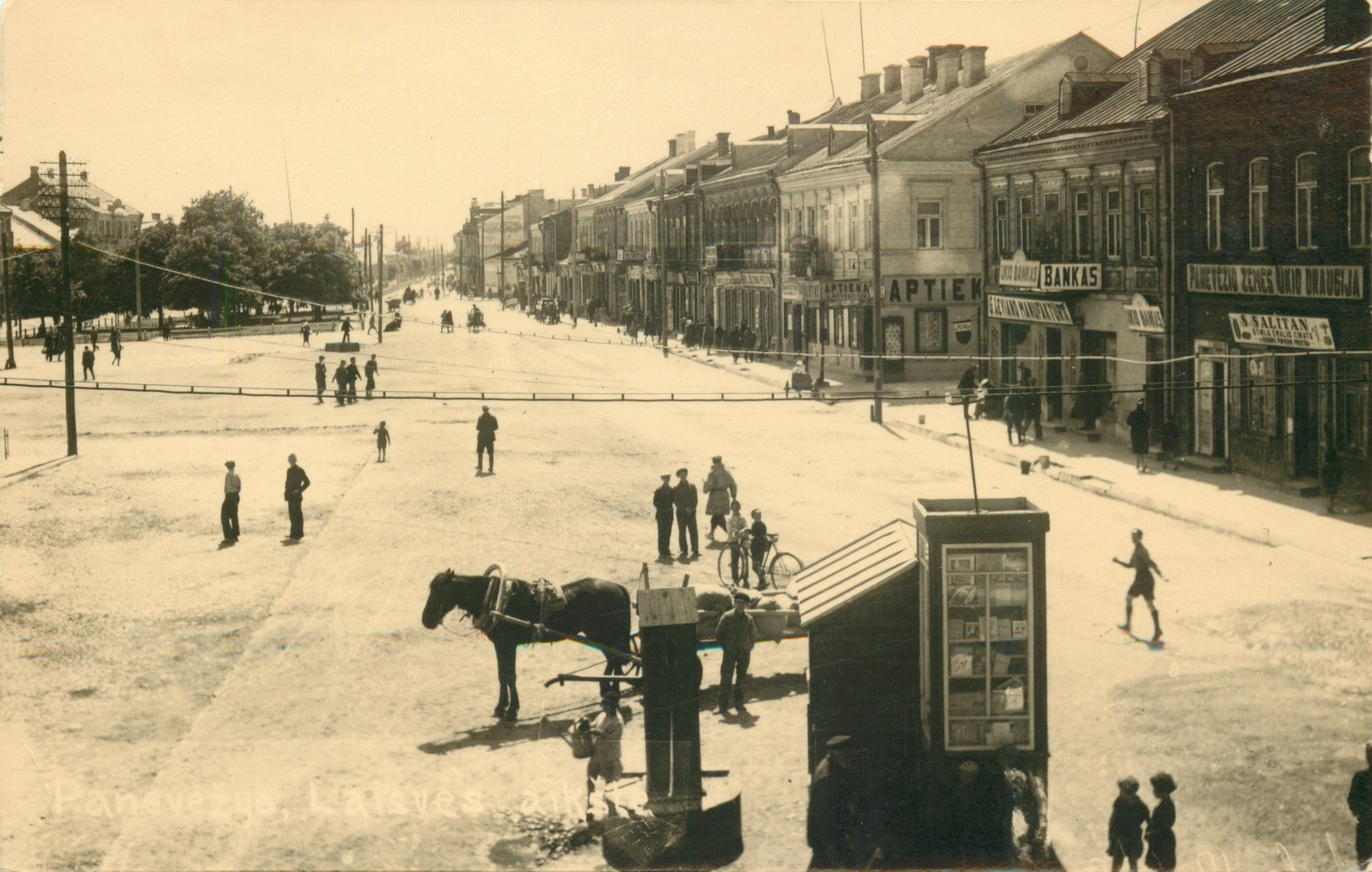
Bustling with businesses Freedom Square (Laisvės aikštė) in Panevėžys, Independent Lithuania in the 1920s. All the historical buildings seen on the picture survived the Second World War intact, but were demolished by the Soviet authorities in the 1950s-1970s.

The Ponevezh Yeshiva, one of the most notable Haredi yeshivas in the history of the Jews in Lithuania, was established and flourished in the town. Rabbi Yosef Shlomo Kahaneman (1886–1969) was its rosh yeshiva (head) and president. Known as the "Ponovezher Rov", he was also the leading rabbi of Panevėžys. He managed to escape to the British Mandate of Palestine where he set about rebuilding the Ponevezh Yeshiva in Bnei Brak where it still exists in modern Israel. It has a very large student body of young Talmud scholars.

Communities of Poles inhabit the area from the 19th century and a Polish Gymnasium existed in Panevėžys until the Second World War (the Polish version of the name of the city was Poniewież).

The town's population rose to 26,200 between 1923 and 1939. On 15 June 1940, Red Army military forces took over the city, as a consequence of the forced incorporation of Lithuania into the Soviet Union. A number of political prisoners were murdered near the sugar factory. A large number of residents were exiled to Siberia (merely during the June deportation in 1941 over 600 residents were exiled to Siberia) or suffered other forms of political repression.

On 23 June 1941, the June Uprising began in Panevėžys County. The most active participants of the uprising were in Ramygala and Krekenava counties. The participants of the uprising were also active in the city of Panevėžys. On 25 June 1941, the Panevėžys Staff of the June Uprising was established in the city which was headed by Lieutenant Colonel Antanas Stapulionis. One of the staff's tasks was to oversee the order in the city, thus Antanas Stapulionis had issued an order stating that the robbers will be shot on the spot, and ordered to remove all signs which reminisced the Soviet rule. Moreover, the scouts were sent to all roads leading from the city and on 25 June, at the initiative of the rebels, the Piniavos Bridge and the food factory Maistas were demined. The Panevėžys Post Office was peacefully passed into the hands of the rebels. During the first days of the war, the NKGB units carried out repressions, arrested participants of the June Uprising and civilians who spoke out against the Soviet government; the detainees were transported to the Panevėžys Prison. As the Germans were approaching, seeing no way out, the Soviets had decided to retreat to the East and to shoot the political prisoners in the prison. Already on 27 June, the city was full of the tricolor flags of Lithuania and without any serious clashes with the retreating Soviet Army in the city or its surroundings. Furthermore, on 27 June, the German army had entered Panevėžys and in the end of June 1941 the Germans liquidated the staff of the rebels.

=== Soviet and Nazi occupations ===
After Germany attacked the USSR, Panevėžys was occupied by German forces, as it had been during the First World War. It acquired the status of a district center (Gebietskommissariate) within the Reichskommissariat Ostland. During the Nazi occupation nearly all the Jewish population of the town was killed in 1943 during the Holocaust; only a few managed to escape and find asylum abroad. The major massacre was in August 1941 when 7,523 Jews were executed by the German Army officers and soldiers, German-SS officers During the period of Nazi German occupation, one police battalion and three engineer battalions were organised primarily from the local population. Also, two companies of the Lithuanian Territorial Defense Force were stationed in Panevėžys

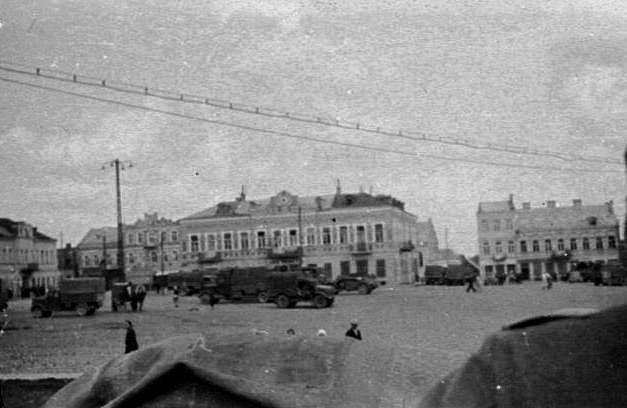
Military vehicles in Freedom Square during World War II

In 1944, the city was yet again occupied by the Soviet Union leading to a new wave of political exiles and killings. The Lithuanian partisans of the Vytis military district actively operated in the Panevėžys County from 1944 and militarily confronted with the Soviet forces in notable battles, however following the death of chief Bronius Karbočius in 1953 the staff of the Vytis military district was not restored and the last partisans were killed in action in 1956.

After World War II, the natural process of the city's evolution was disrupted. The Soviet Communist Party exercised dictatorial control and the city was transformed into a major industrial center. During the 1960s and 1980s, several large-scale industrial companies were established. The Soviet authorities also partly destroyed the old town and only after protests by local population was total destruction of the old city center stopped.

The number of inhabitants increased from 41,000 to 101,500 between 1959 and 1979.

=== Independent Lithuania ===
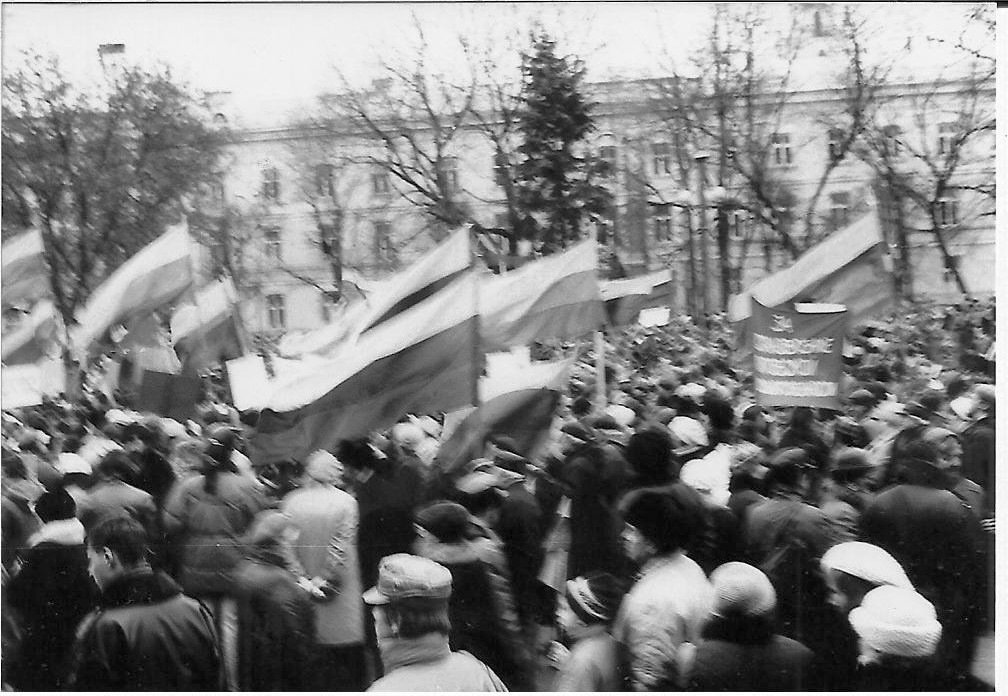
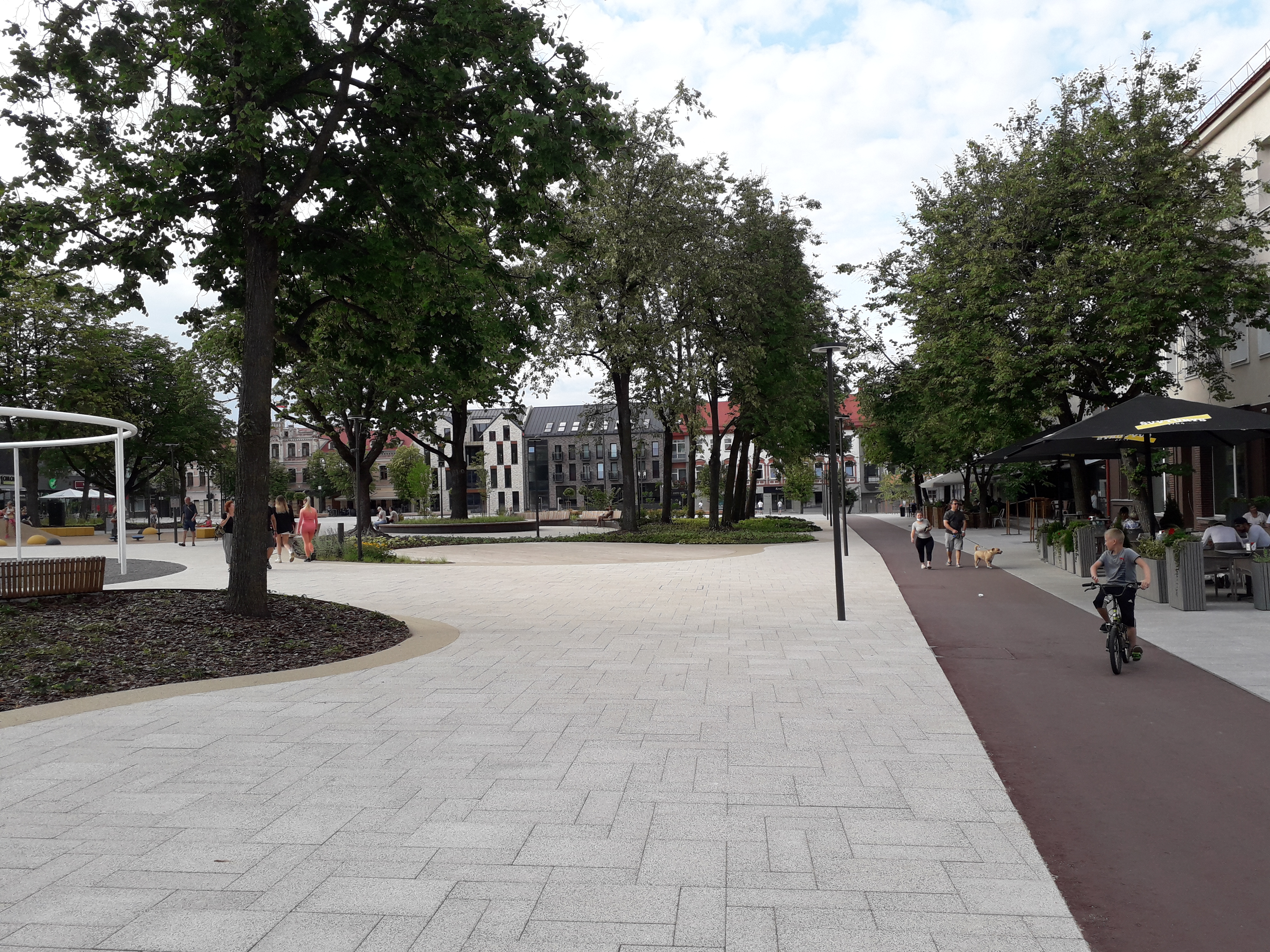
Rally in Freedom Square in 1991, condemning the January Events (left); Freedom Square in 2021 (right)

In 1990, the population reached 130,000. After Lithuania regained its independence, the city's industry faced some major challenges. For some time it was regarded as a place where plastics cooperatives were making large profits. During the 1990s, with crime rate increasing in all post-Soviet states, Panevėžys shortly became one of the centres of criminal activity in Lithuania. The city hosted multiple gangs, such as the Tulpiniai gang. The crime rate in the city became so high the local residents began calling the city Chicago on the Nevėžis river.

After independence, the population of Panevėžys fell somewhat and for a while most investment went to Vilnius and Klaipėda instead. However, with the economic growth in the early 2000s, investment also reached Panevėžys. Babilonas real estate project, the largest such project in the Baltic States with an 80 ha land area, has been developed in Panevėžys since 2004.

Panevėžys Free Economic Zone was established in 2013.

== Geography ==
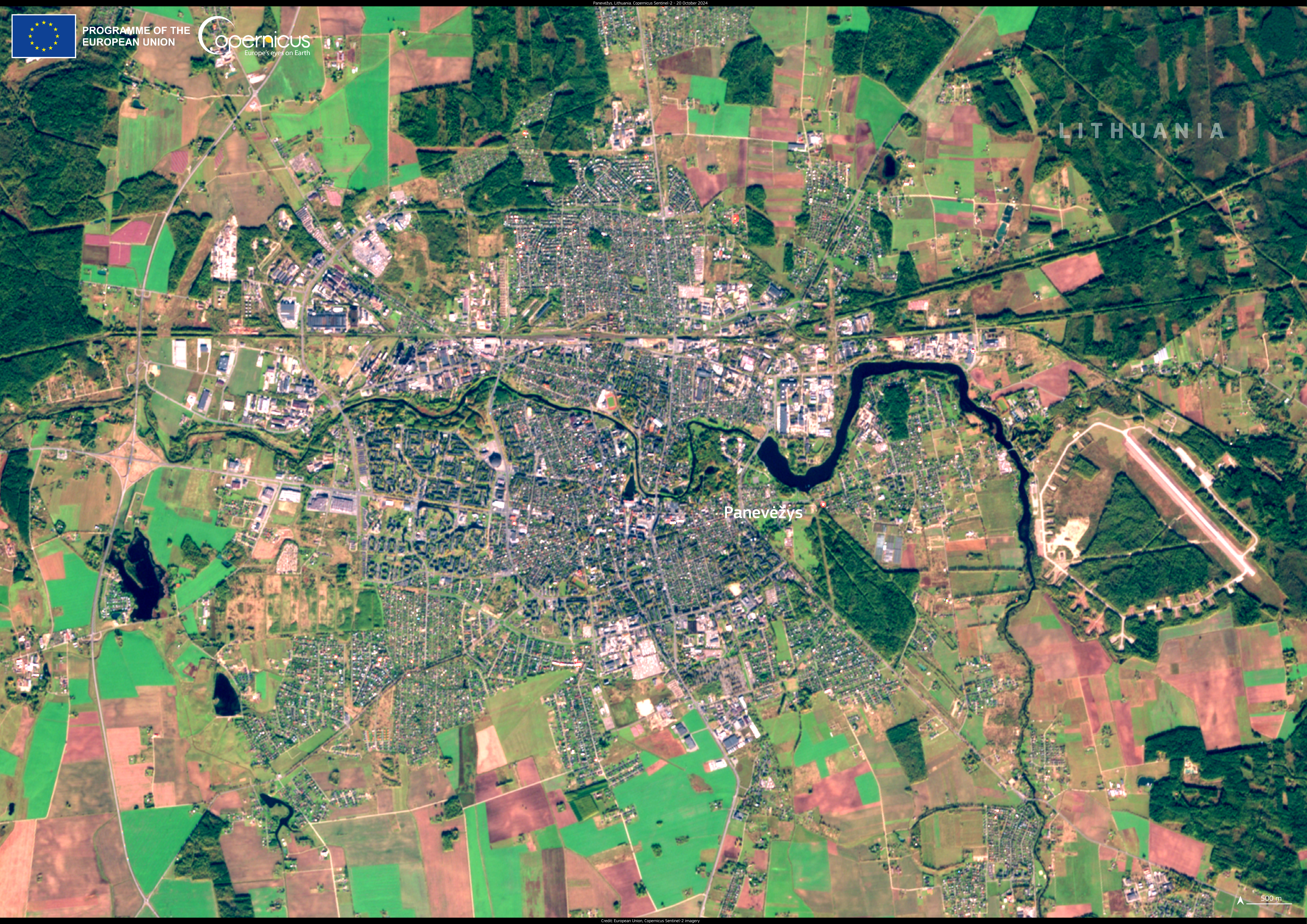
Copernicus Sentinel-2 image of Panevėžys from space.

Panevėžys is situated in the middle of Lithuania; it is halfway between two Baltic capitals – Lithuania's Vilnius and Latvia's Riga. The territory of Panevėžys takes 90 km^{2} (34.75 sq mi) and it is situated on the banks of the river Nevėžis. Moreover, in the territory of Panevėžys there are a few tributaries of river Nevėžis: Žagienis, Šermutas, Molaina, Juosta, and Sanžilė.

The good geographical location with good road infrastructure, and the international highway Via Baltica provides opportunities for business. The city is connected by railway to Šiauliai (Lithuania) and Daugavpils (Latvia), as well as with Rubikiai/Anykščiai by the Aukštaitijos narrow gauge railway which is preserved as a historical monument and serves as a tourist attraction.

The land in Panevėžys is fertile, therefore it was historically intensively used for agriculture.

=== Climate ===
Panevėžys has a humid continental climate (Köppen Dfb).

Climate data for Panevėžys (1991–2020 normals, extremes 1959–present)
Month	Jan	Feb	Mar	Apr	May	Jun	Jul	Aug	Sep	Oct	Nov	Dec	Year
Record high °C (°F)	11.8 (53.2)	10.6 (51.1)	18.1 (64.6)	26.6 (79.9)	29.5 (85.1)	32.5 (90.5)	35.3 (95.5)	34.0 (93.2)	28.4 (83.1)	21.7 (71.1)	13.6 (56.5)	10.3 (50.5)	35.3 (95.5)
Mean daily maximum °C (°F)	−0.8 (30.6)	0.0 (32.0)	4.8 (40.6)	12.6 (54.7)	18.5 (65.3)	21.7 (71.1)	24.1 (75.4)	23.3 (73.9)	17.8 (64.0)	10.7 (51.3)	4.6 (40.3)	0.7 (33.3)	11.5 (52.7)
Daily mean °C (°F)	−3.1 (26.4)	−2.8 (27.0)	0.9 (33.6)	7.4 (45.3)	12.8 (55.0)	16.3 (61.3)	18.6 (65.5)	17.6 (63.7)	12.7 (54.9)	7.0 (44.6)	2.4 (36.3)	−1.3 (29.7)	7.4 (45.3)
Mean daily minimum °C (°F)	−5.6 (21.9)	−5.6 (21.9)	−2.6 (27.3)	2.4 (36.3)	7.0 (44.6)	10.7 (51.3)	13.2 (55.8)	12.4 (54.3)	8.3 (46.9)	3.9 (39.0)	−0.3 (31.5)	−3.5 (25.7)	3.4 (38.0)
Record low °C (°F)	−27.4 (−17.3)	−27.7 (−17.9)	−17.0 (1.4)	−6.5 (20.3)	−2.5 (27.5)	1.9 (35.4)	5.8 (42.4)	0.0 (32.0)	−3.8 (25.2)	−8.0 (17.6)	−21.5 (−6.7)	−30.3 (−22.5)	−30.3 (−22.5)
Average precipitation mm (inches)	41 (1.6)	33 (1.3)	33 (1.3)	37 (1.5)	51 (2.0)	64 (2.5)	83 (3.3)	65 (2.6)	50 (2.0)	58 (2.3)	48 (1.9)	45 (1.8)	608 (24.1)
Average precipitation days (≥ 1 mm)	11.1	11.9	10.1	8.3	9.1	10.8	9.7	10.4	7.8	11.0	11.2	11.1	122.5
Average relative humidity (%)	87	84	78	70	69	72	74	76	81	85	89	89	79
Source 1: Lithuanian Hydrometeorological Service
Source 2: NOAA (precipitation days-extremes)

== Culture ==
=== Painting and sculpture ===
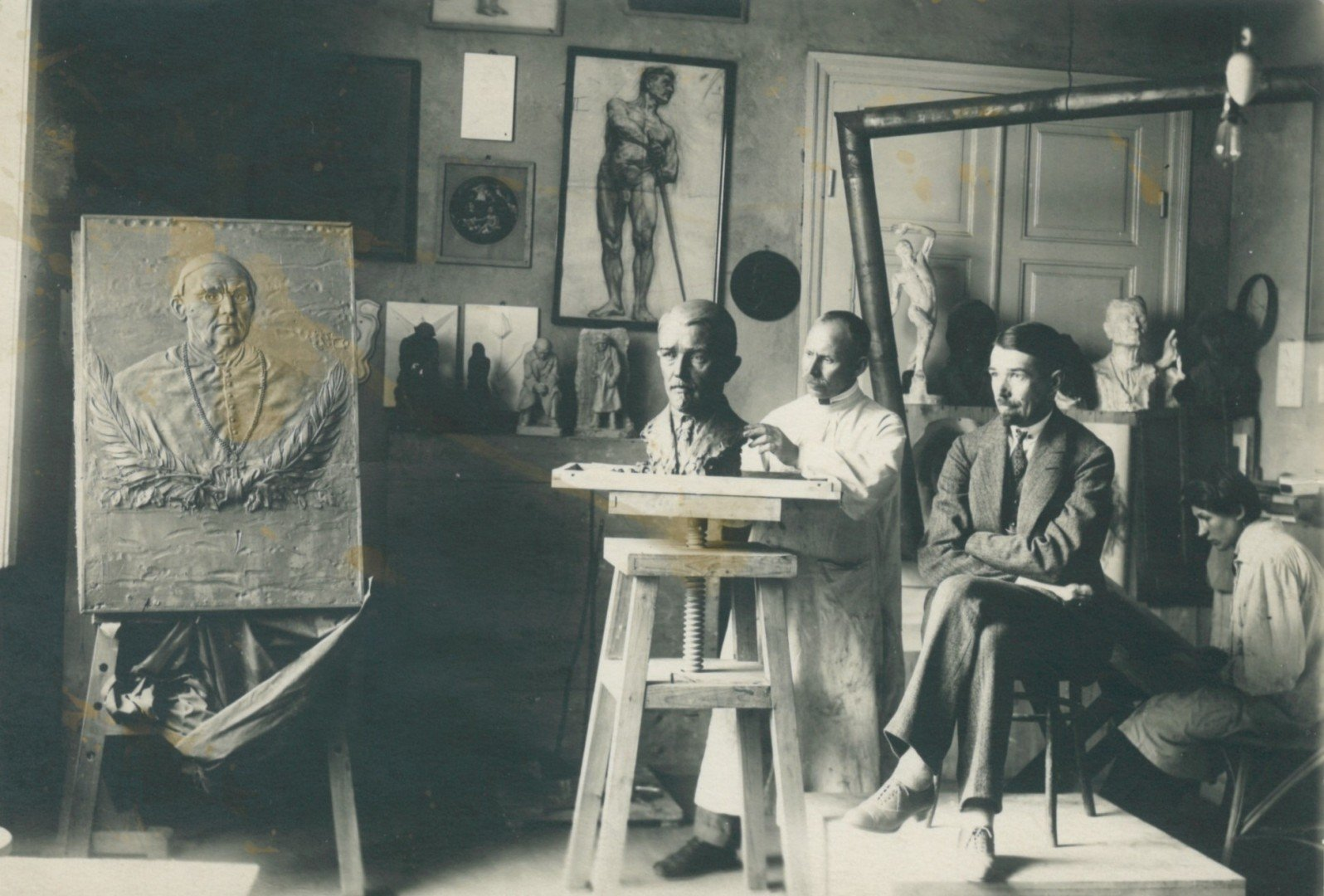
Juozas Zikaras creating a bust of Matas Grigonis while in Panevėžys in 1925

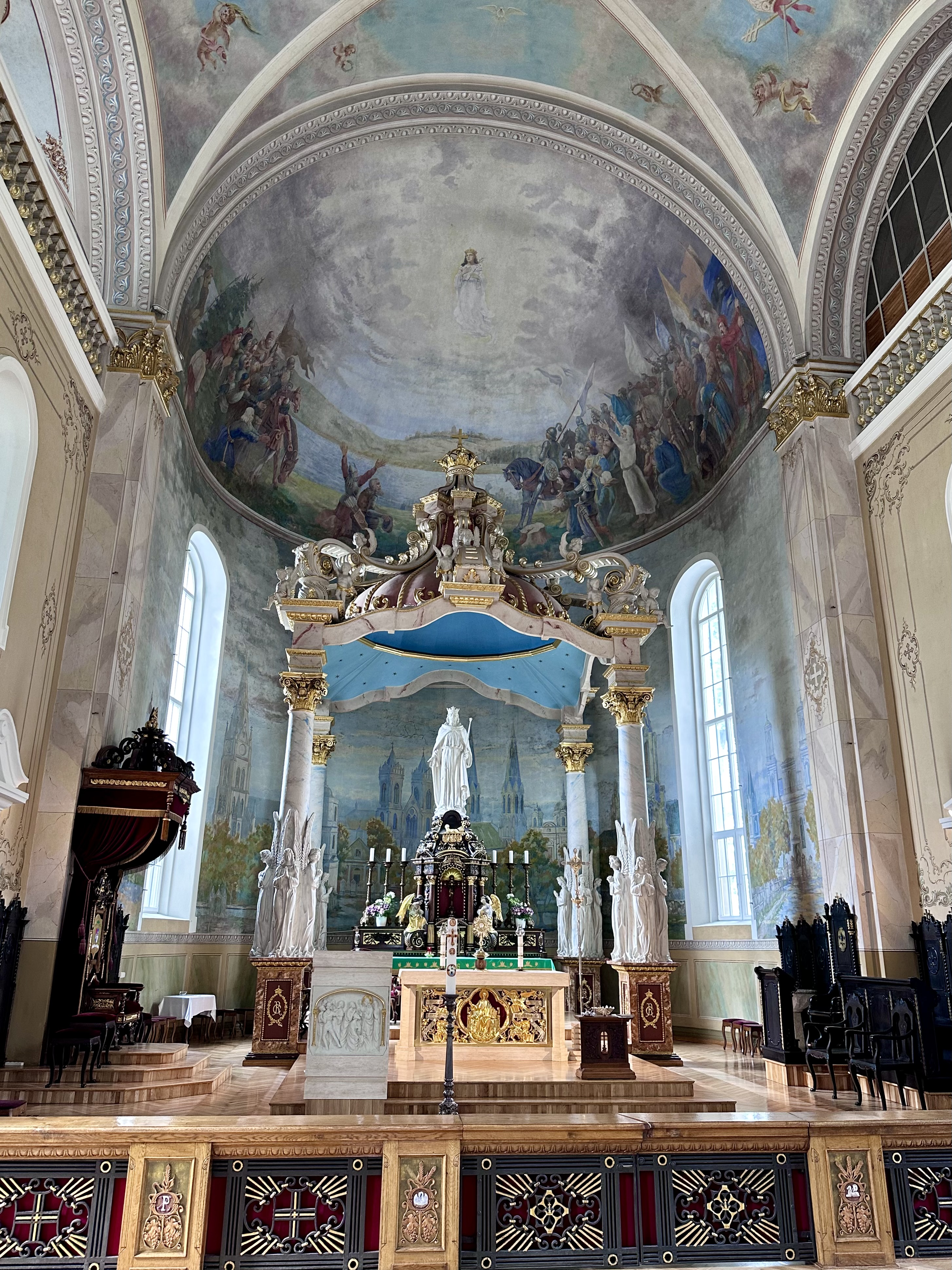
Fresco of Saint Casimir by Jonas Mackevičius in the Panevėžys Cathedral

In Panevėžys, cultural heritage is closely related to the visual arts – painters and sculptors who not only created locally, but also contributed to the formation of national Lithuanian artistic identity and helped Panevėžys turn into not only an industrial but also a creative city.

One of the most prominent is sculptor, designer Juozas Zikaras, who was born in Paliūkai village near Panevėžys, graduated from the Imperial Academy of Arts in Saint Petersburg and upon returning to Lithuania in 1918 lived, created in Panevėžys and worked as a teacher at the Panevėžys State Gymnasium for a decade until 1928. Zikaras is known for creating the interwar period state symbols of Lithuania, Lithuanian litas coins, sculptures (e.g. Freedom Monument in Kaunas), medals (e.g. Independence Medal), busts and bas-reliefs of famous Lithuanians (e.g. Jonas Basanavičius, Juozas Tumas-Vaižgantas, Janusz Radziwiłł) and foreigners (e.g. Roman general Julius Caesar) as well as works dedicated to the Lithuanian Wars of Independence.

Another famous Lithuanian sculptor Bernardas Bučas was born in Naurašiliai village, Panevėžys County, later studied at the Panevėžys State Gymnasium where he was taught by Zikaras who encouraged Bučas to study fine arts in Rome and the Royal Academy of Fine Arts in Brussels, while upon returning to Lithuania in 1930 he settled in Panevėžys. Bučas is especially known for busts dedicated to the medieval Lithuanian monarchs: Mindaugas, Gediminas, Vytautas the Great (was multiplied many times, while the original is exhibited in the Panevėžys Local Lore Museum) and interwar period Lithuanian personalities: Maironis, President Antanas Smetona, as well as interwar period Lithuanian postage stamps, etc.

Other famous visual arts artists who were born in Panevėžys and its county are painter Kanuty Rusiecki, painter Juozas Kaminskas, painter Kazimieras Naruševičius, who contributed to the founding of the Panevėžys Art School, sculptor Juozas Lebednykas, painter and graphic artist Stasys Eidrigevičius, who received many international awards, graphic designer Virginija Kalinauskaitė, painter and glazier Remigijus Kriukas, painter and performer Česlovas Lukenskas, painter and educator Irina Nosova, painter Girmantas Rudokas, painter Romualdas Petrauskas, sculptor Stanislovas Kuzma, painter Stasys Petrauskas, painter and sculptor Kazimieras Kisielis, painter Aleksas Andriuškevičius, painter Lilija Eugenija Jasiūnaitė, etc.

Moreover, famous 20th century Lithuanian artists Vytautas Kairiūkštis, Povilas Puzinas, Jonas Mackevičius (painted a fresco The Appearance of St. Casimir to the Lithuanian Army near Polotsk in the Panevėžys Cathedral) also worked in Panevėžys.

=== Museums and galleries ===
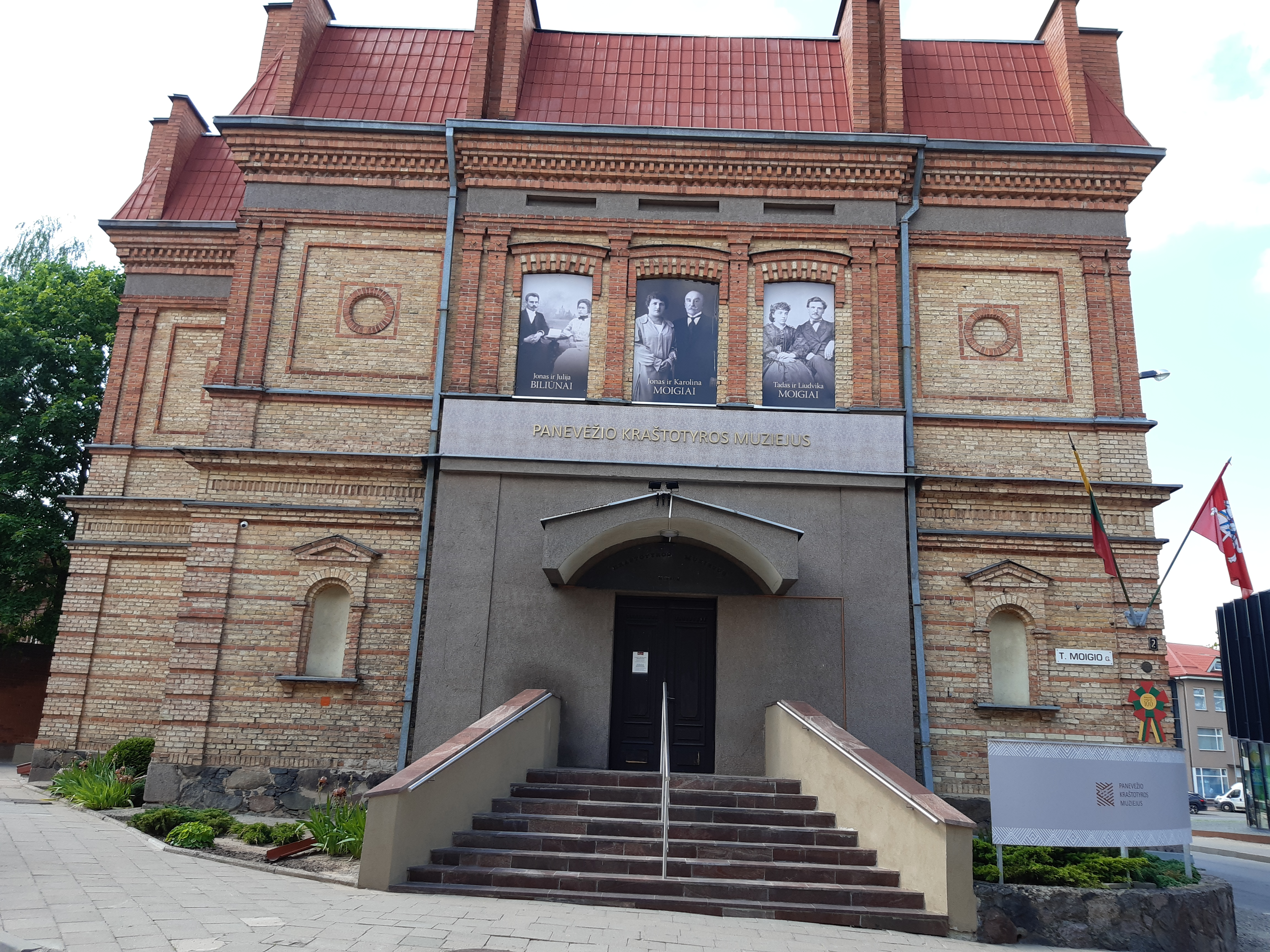
Panevėžys Local Lore Museum

The Panevėžys Local Lore Museum was established in 1924 and is one of the oldest and most extensive regional museums in Lithuania with ten different collections. The Archaeology Collection was begun to be formed back in 1925 when the museum was established by the members of the Society for the Study of the Native Land and the first collection consisted of about 500 finds collected by teachers and their students. Since 1975, it has been professionally managed by archaeologist Alfreda Petrulienė, who has examined over 40 archaeological monuments of Aukštaitija region. Currently, the Archaeology Collection contains about 4,000 exhibits, mainly Stone Age and Bronze Age tools, weapons, flint objects and finds from the old town of Panevėžys. The most valuable part of the Archaeology Collection is about 500 stone axes and 626 exhibits from the city cemetery, dating to the 16th–18th centuries. The Ethnography Collection was also started to be formed in 1925 and contains over 3,600 exhibits (e.g. 19th–20th centuries furnitures, ceramics, clothing, wooden crosses and other sacral sculptures, etc.). The Item Collection contains personal belongings of famous residents of Panevėžys as well as works of visual art of local authors (e.g. Juozas Zikaras, Bernardas Bučas) and other authors. The Documents Collection contain over 5,000 documents related with the region's history, the oldest document dates to 1585. The Numismatics Collection contain Lithuanian and foreign currencies since the 14th century. Other collections are dedicated to nature, photography, books, periodic, and there is a supporting collection.

Stasys Museum, named after Stasys Eidrigevičius and exhibiting his artworks

The Panevėžys Civic Art Gallery was established in 1990 and is one of the most important visual arts galleries in Lithuania. Since 1989 Panevėžys has been organizing the Panevėžys International Ceramics Symposia, while the Panevėžys Civic Art Gallery houses unique Modern Ceramics Collection of nearly 700 works (mostly created during the Symposia), which is the biggest in the Baltic states and is added to each year. The Visual Arts Collection contains 57 works by renowned Lithuanian authors, including Juozas Kaminskas, Stasys Eidrigevičius, Kazys Naruševičius. Since 2005 the Gallery began to organize the Panevėžys International Photography Biennial and established a separate Photography Collection which has 519 works of photography and video art.

On May 31, 2024, the Stasys Museum was opened which is a modern contemporary art center of national importance and is named after internationally renowned artist Stasys Eidrigevičius. The Museum has 3,700 square meters, exhibits Stasys Eidrigevičius' works and carries out international cooperation projects. In the first month after the opening the Museum was visited by nearly 20,000 Lithuanian and foreign visitors.

Other smaller art galleries in Panevėžys are Galerija XX, A Galerija, Menų namai.

=== Theatre ===
Panevėžys is a city boasting several significant performing arts centers, which have gained an international reputation.

Juozas Miltinis Drama Theatre

The Juozas Miltinis Drama Theatre was established in 1940 and it was the first newly built theatre after the World War II in Lithuania. The Juozas Miltinis Drama Theatre is named after the renowned Lithuanian theatre director Juozas Miltinis, who before returning to Lithuania in 1940 studied in Paris and London. On December 1, 1940, Miltinis was appointed as Theatre's director and a group of actors arrived together with him from the Kaunas Labor Palace Theatre Studio, while on March 15, 1941, the Theatre was officially opened with the first spectacle directed by Miltinis. Already during the Soviet period the Theatre challenged the Socialist realism and offered spectacles based on the famous Western authors works (e.g. Henrik Ibsen, William Shakespeare, Wolfgang Borchert, Friedrich Dürrenmatt, August Strindberg) in addition to the Russian authors works (e.g. Anton Chekhov) and was well known throughout the Soviet Union. In 1967 a new dedicated building for the Theatre was built. The Theatre contributed to the education of new Lithuanian actors and the roles in the Theatre were also performed by titled actors such as Donatas Banionis and the Golden Stage Cross recipients Albinas Kėleris, Asta Preidytė, etc. In the recent years the spectacles in the Theatre are directed by Lithuanian and foreign directors. In front of the Theatre building there is Miltinis' sculpture.

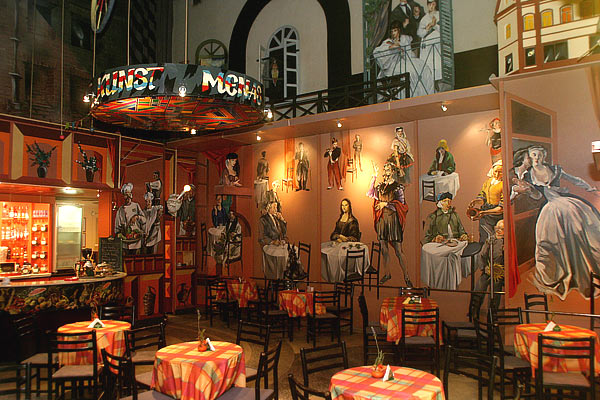
Coffee of the Theatre Menas

The Panevėžys Puppet Wagon Theatre in winter season performs in several buildings on the Respublikos Street, while in summer season it transforms into a horse-drawn puppet theatre, resembling the gypsy caravan, and it travels in the entire territory of Lithuania, including remote villages and towns where it brings culture. The Panevėžys Puppet Wagon Theatre is the only such travelling puppet theatre in Europe. Each year the Theatre organizes hundreds of performances and attracts tens of thousands of spectators.

The Theatre Menas was established in 1991 by director Julius Dautartas and painter Kęstutis Vaičiulis aiming at young actors and their education. The spectacles directed by the Theatre are often showcased in other European theatres and actors of the Theatre acts in them. In front of the entrance to the Theatre there is a sculpture of Don Quixote.

The Panevėžys Musical Theatre was established in 1993 and it offers performances of opera, operetta, musical theatre, dance theatre, etc. The Theatre unites over 100 performing arts professionals and it is the largest cultural institution in Aukštaitija region.

== Cityscape ==
=== Urbanism and architecture ===
==== 16th – 18th centuries ====
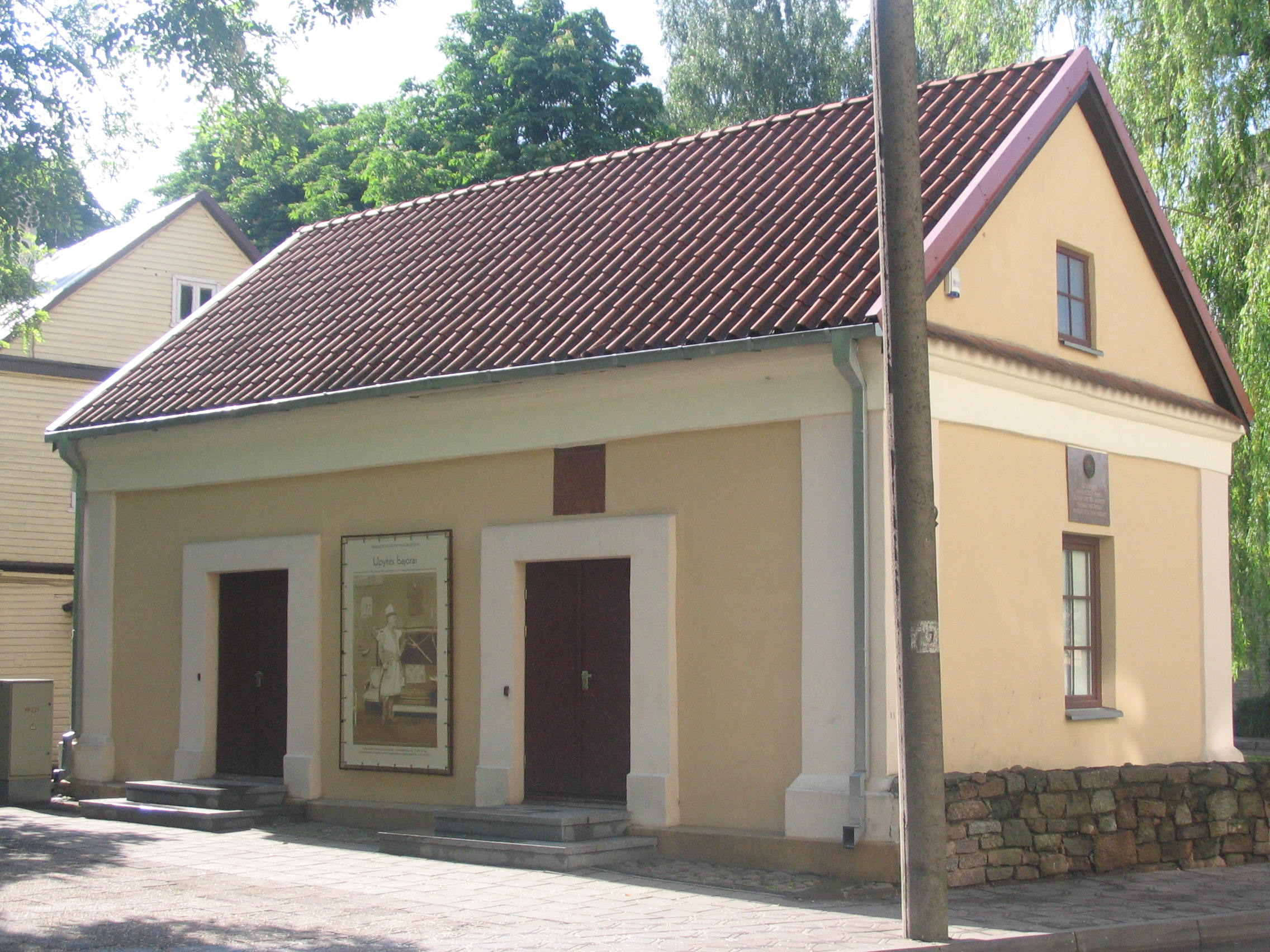
The former archive of the Upytė County Court is the oldest known house in Panevėžys, built in 1614

Old Panevėžys started to develop at the beginning of the 16th century on the right bank of Nevėžis when Grand Duke Alexander Jagiellon separated the lands from the state manor for the Parish of Ramygala, currently this part of Panevėžys is located in the Senamiesčio Street (Old Town Street). Soon, in a more convenient place, on the land of the Grand Duke's manor on the left bank of the Nevėžis, near the important roads to Ramygala and Upytė, New Panevėžys began to develop (the current city center). Following the Volok Reform at the end of the 16th century, New Panevėžys separated from the manor and became a separate territorial unit. Between the Old and the New Town stood the Panevėžys Manor, thus the different dependence of these parts of the city (to the state, the church, and the private nobleman) prevented Panevėžys from developing evenly. As a result, no prominent architectural ensembles and dominant compositions were formed, also there were no public buildings that stood out in terms of size or artistic expression. The city consisted of single-storey wooden buildings, a wooden church, and a small, inexpressive manor house. The only surviving heritage of that period in the city is the Renaissance style building of the Upytė County Court and the network of streets.

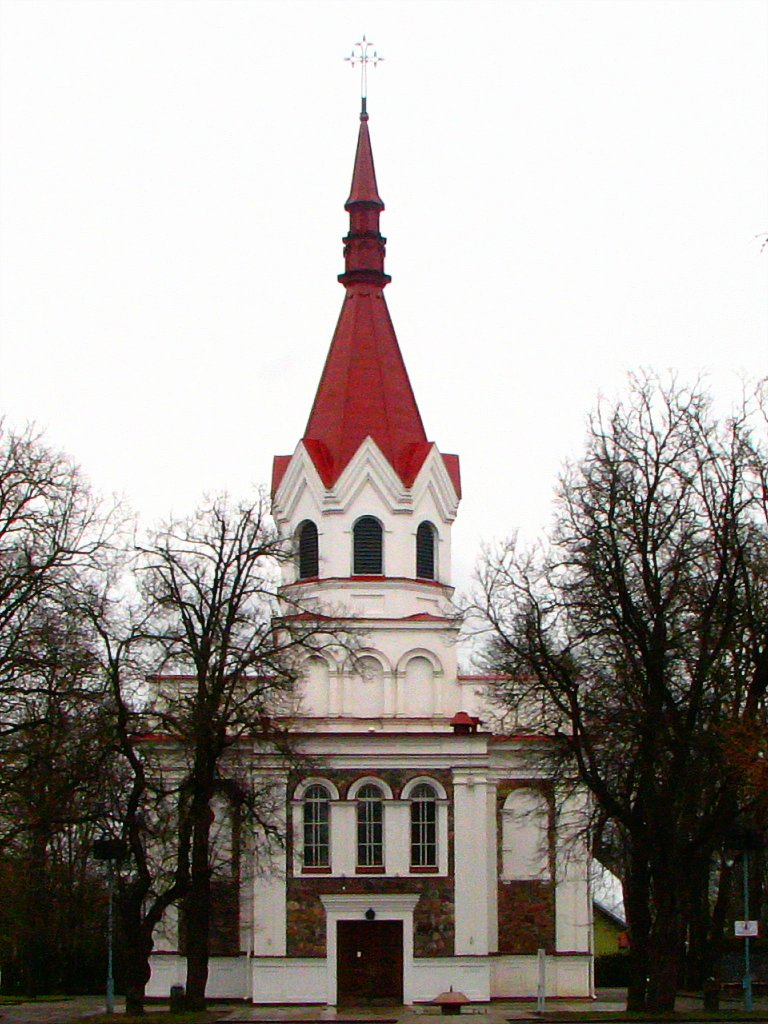
Church of the Holy Trinity which was turned into an Eastern Orthodox church following the suppression of the Uprising of 1831

The city was severely damaged during the war with Moscow in 1654–1667 and the Great Northern War of 1700–1721, thus only 18 families lived in Old Panevėžys in 1720 and 90 families in New Panevėžys in 1738. In the second half of the 18th century, Panevėžys, like many other small cities affected by the wars, consisted almost exclusively of wooden one-storey houses. In 1727, on the western side of the New Panevėžys Square, the construction of the ensemble of the Piarists Monastery was started: the monastery building, the church and the college (to be rebuilt after the fire of 1790 with a Classicist style stone masonry church). New buildings and the wooden synagogue built in 1794 did not change the city plan, but highlighted the city center, which had no striking accents in terms of size and spatial composition. Of these buildings, only the church has survived to this day, while others were damaged during the World War II and were demolished in the post-war years. The houses around the city's square highlighted its space, while the part of the city beyond the river (Old Panevėžys) had a typical rural view.

In the 1780s, there were two independent uniform radial-plan urban complexes separated by a forest: the town of New Panevėžys and the town of Old Panevėžys. In 1780, after the burning of the wooden church of Old Panevėžys, it was rebuilt not in the previous place, but in the pine forest of the Nevėžis loop, between both parts of Panevėžys. After cutting down the forest around the church in 1782, a new town was built next to it, according to the traditional rectangular plan and the planned square, which under the tsar's administration in the 19th century was named Nikolaev (called as Smėlynė by the local folks). It was initially called Mikołajew, after its founder provost of St. Casimir's Chapel in the Vilnius Cathedral, Mikołaj Tyszkiewicz. In 1781, Old Panevėžys had 2 streets and 21 homestead, while in 1788 in New Panevėžys there were 144 plots near 8 streets. The longest in this part of Panevėžys was Ramygalos Street, which was divided into two branches at the northern end and between them was a triangular market square. At the end of the 18th century, a mixed plan of Panevėžys was forming: it consisted of three parts of different sizes and different stages of development. The entire structure was dominated by New Panevėžys in which the Piarists Monastery with a Classicist style towerless stone church was rebuilt after the fire of 1790.

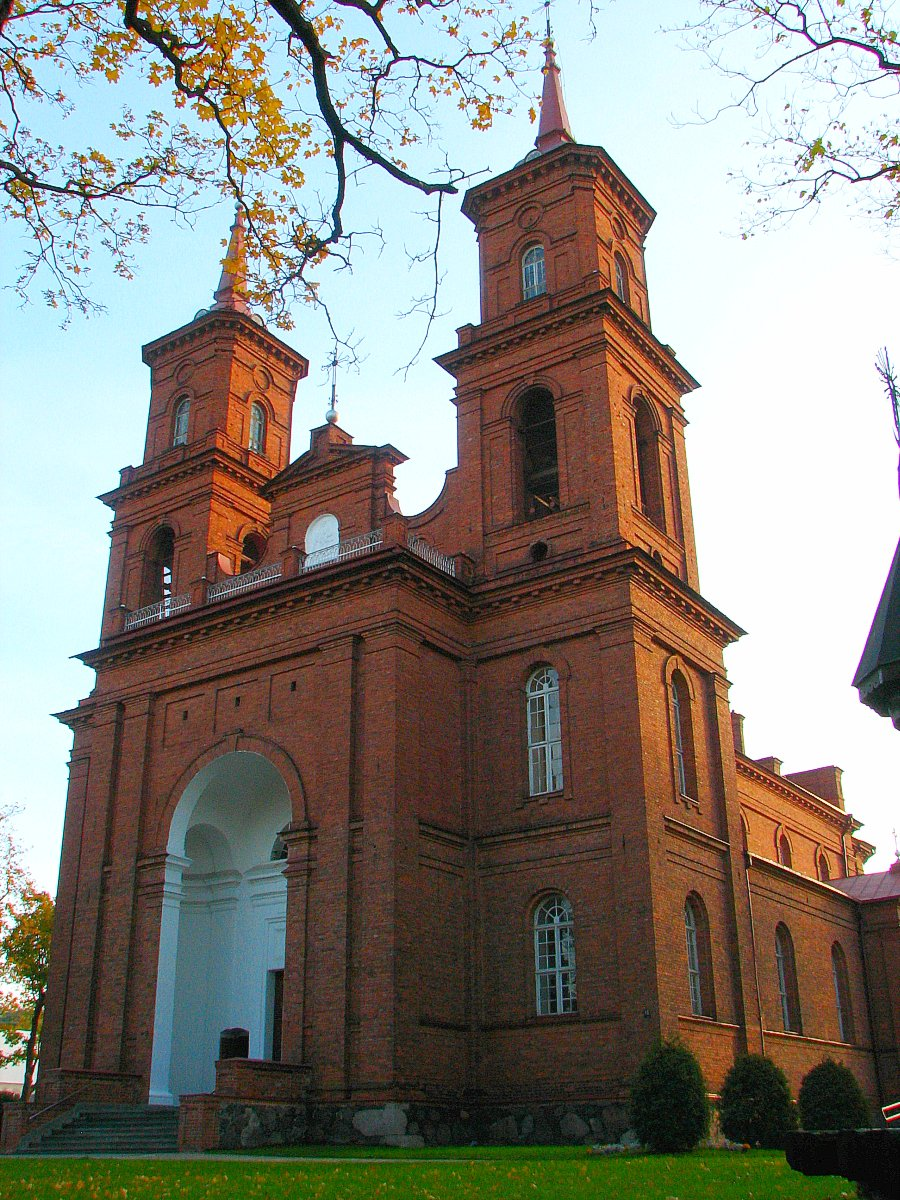
St. Peter and St. Paul's Church, completed in 1885

==== 19th – early 20th centuries ====
Since the early 19th century, New Panevėžys grew faster and by the middle of the century its territory spread mostly to the west, less to the east, and with other parts of the city – Old Panevėžys and especially the grown-up Smėlynė (which had 7 streets and a square in 1856) – had already formed a single complex. As the territory grew more slowly than the population, the buildings were mostly built in the central part of New Panevėžys, where densely built-up quarters were formed. After 1825 the Evangelical Lutheran Church was built in the city (it was rebuilt in 1845), while in 1830 the county's treasury, in 1837 – a prison, after 1840 – a hospital and after 1842 – a boyar's school were built. The significance of the Piarists Monastery increased, however it was closed after the November Uprising and the monks' corps was turned into a military barracks, while the Catholic church was remade into an Eastern Orthodox church. There were a number of brick buildings in New Panevėžys, some of them in the Classicist style and brick buildings began to dominate in the city center. However, unlike in most Lithuanian cities, Panevėžys spread over a rather large area on both sides of Nevėžis and lacked buildings which would have formed its silhouette and highlighted the panorama of the city in the landscape of plains. In 1877–1885, the St. Peter and St. Paul's Church of Romanesque Revival style with two tall towers was built instead of a wooden church, which began to dominate in the city's silhouette. In 1878, a planning project for the city of Panevėžys was prepared in which new quarters were planned in the northern and southern parts of the city as an organic continuation of the already established plan (12 new quarters were added to the existing 49 quarters). Since 1873, the growth of the city was also influenced by the completed railway track between Radviliškis and Daugavpils; the railway and station soon grew into the fabric of an expanding city.

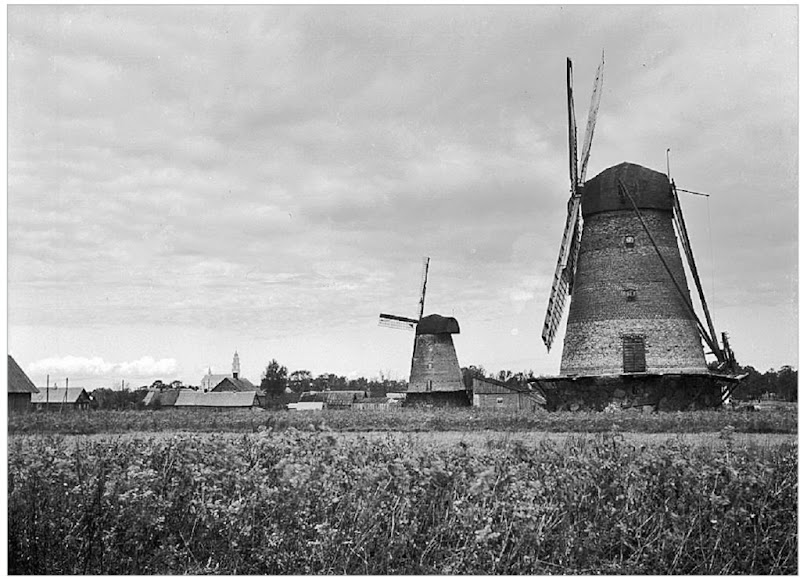
Windmills in Panevėžys that were constructed in the 19th century

Other notable buildings from the 19th century and early 20th century are two windmills in Ramygalos Street (built in 1875 and 1880), historicism brick style Panevėžys bottling plant of the state vodka monopoly in Kranto Street (built in 1880; served as a Panevėžys Cannery during the Soviet period), building of the current Juozas Balčikonis Gymnasium (1884), residential house of J. Kasperovičius (1889; served as a court during the interwar period, later as a Local Lore Museum during the Soviet period and currently is the Panevėžys City Art Gallery), historicism brick style prison buildings – a two-story administrative building near the street and a four-story prison building in the courtyard (1893; P. Puzino St. 12), eclectic two-storey hotel Centralinis with mezzanine and attic (1894; Laisvės Square 1), Moigių houses complex of pink and yellow brick masonry (1895; now Panevėžys Museum of Local Lore), historicism style yeast and distillery factory buildings (Respublikos St. 82), historicism style two-storey J. Masiulis Bookstore (1890–1900), Natelis Kisinas' house (1900; in 1987 it was integrated into the Panevėžys City Municipality building complex), neoclassical with Art Nouveau style features Panevėžys Credit Society Palace (1915; now Panevėžys County Gabrielė Petkevičaitė-Bitė Public Library).

==== Interwar period ====
Former branch of the Bank of Lithuania with Vytis above its entrance

Wooden villa of attorney Česlovas Petraškevičius in the city's outskirts

During the World War I around 100 buildings were damaged or destroyed in Panevėžys. Following the Lithuanian Wars of Independence, Panevėžys began to recover: city's bridges were renovated (1925), streets were paved, a power plant was built (1923). During the interwar period, a number of public and residential buildings and industrial buildings were built in the city, and a precise geodetic plan of the city was prepared – one of the first such works in Lithuania (1933–1934; engineers M. Ratautas, A. Kočegūra, P. Butrimas). In the 1930s, the construction of the sewerage system was started, the bed of the Nevėžis was adjusted, and Laisvės Square was renewed. In the early 1920s, the city lacked funds, thus the first slightly more significant building was a modest one-storey primary school with an attic at the intersection of Marija (now A. Smetona) and Klaipėdos streets, built in 1923; in the same year a wooden Panevėžys County Hospital was built.

Since the end of the 1920s, much more significant buildings have been built. In 1928, the Jewish Gymnasium from yellowish bricks was built in Elektros Street in the style of historicism (now serves as the Panevėžys Regional Court), which was called as a palace due to its splendid exterior decoration and installed heating and water supply systems. In 1930, the Panevėžys Cathedral of Neo-Baroque style forms was consecrated by Jonas Mačiulis-Maironis. In the 1930s, instead of historicism, the style of Lithuanian modernism began to prevail: building of the Panevėžys branch of the Bank of Lithuania (1931), Panevėžys State Girls' Gymnasium in Smėlynės Street (1932; architect Vytautas Landsbergis-Žemkalnis), Panevėžys District Municipality Building (1933), Jewish People's Bank building in Respublikos Street (1933; now restaurant Nendrė vėjyje), Panevėžys City Primary School No. 3 in Ukmergės Street (1935), Panevėžys Regional Health Insurance Fund Building (1937), primary school in Danutės Street (1938; now Panevėžys 5th Gymnasium), a two-storey Panevėžys Farmers Small Credit Bank Building in Laisvės Square (1938), Panevėžys St. Chapel of the Immaculate Conception of the Virgin Mary in Marijonų Street (1939), three-storey primary school no. 2 in Maironio Street (1940; now Panevėžys Raimundas Sargūnas Sports Gymnasium), a four-storey building for the Seminary of Priests of the Panevėžys Diocese (now Panevėžys Kazimieras Paltarokas Gymnasium), Panevėžys County Municipal Palace (1940). Cheap wooden construction was more popular for residential housing, thus houses in Panevėžys were also much cheaper (~9,000 LTL) than in Kaunas (~30,000 LTL) and Šiauliai (~19,000 LTL).

==== Middle – late 20th century ====
Seminary of Priests of the Panevėžys Diocese building, which was completed after the World War II

During the World War II, Panevėžys was damaged quite severely again. After the war, part of the historic buildings were reconstructed, and large-scale buildings that did not correspond to the historical scale appeared in the destroyed places and empty spaces. The mostly damaged part of Panevėžys was a quarter between Ukmergė and Elektros streets, which has long been inhabited by the poor Jews (so-called Slobodka); at the end of the 1960s many brick apartment buildings were built in this quarter along with the Juozas Miltinis Drama Theatre (1967–1968).

Industrial enterprises were renovated in the post-war years, three-storey blocks of flats were built in empty places in the city center and near the center in Kranto, Ukmergės, N. Gogolio (now Smėlynės), Ramygalos, Klaipėdos, Agronomijos (now Marijonų), Sandėlių (now S. Kerbedžio) streets, Liepų Avenue, and two-storey houses in Margių, Algirdo, Stoties streets. During the Soviet era, Panevėžys was developed as an industrial center. According to the 1961 master plan, two industrial districts were formed: the city's northwest and northeast. In the sixties and seventies, large industrial companies were built: Lietkabelis, reinforced concrete products, precision mechanics, autocompressors, Ekranas factory, glass factory.

Consequently, the city grew rapidly as residents from the surrounding villages and other districts moved to Panevėžys and construction of apartment districts has begun. The first quarters of 4–5 storey brick houses were built in P. Rotomskio (now Marijonų), Vilnius, J. Basanavičius streets, while since 1965 large-scale prefabricated houses were built, mainly five-storey (so-called khrushchyovkas). The characteristic features of the buildings built in the 1970s and 1980s are the ignorance of the architectural environment, the use of strict, ascetic forms, the abandonment of aesthetic architectural goals, turning them into styless buildings. The multi-apartment houses built in the city center based on repeated projects diminished and leveled the general urban character of the center.

==== Last decade of the 20th century – 21st century ====
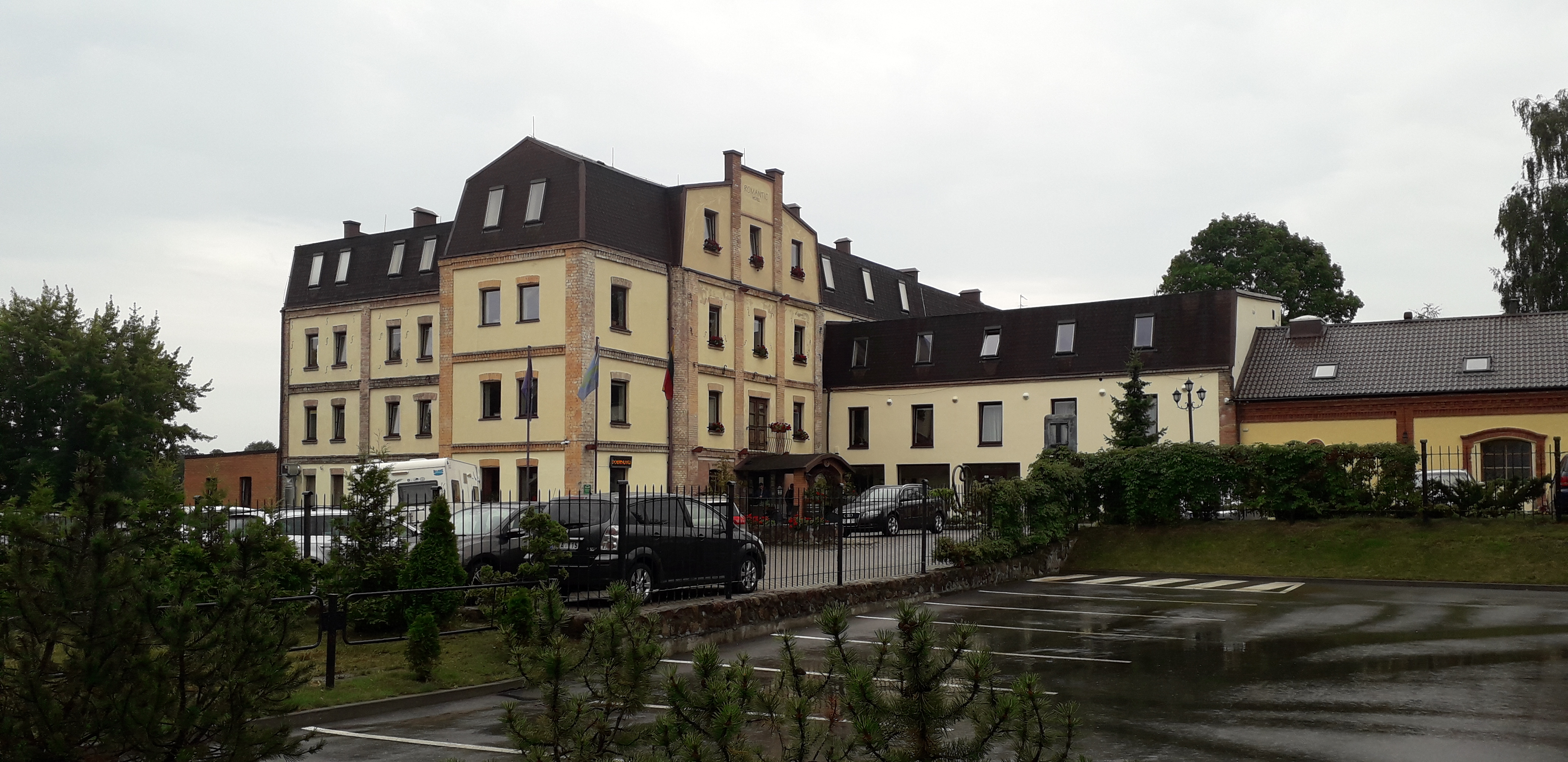
Hotel established on the premises of a former mill – the oldest mechanical mill in the Baltics

In the first years of the re-established Independent Lithuania, huge residential houses of several hundred square meters with no architectural value began to sprout on the outskirts of the city. No major constructions took place: the development of Kniaudiškės multi-apartment district stopped, the construction of public buildings decreased and with the closure of many industries, their buildings have been abandoned and demolished, however many buildings were also adapted by modern companies in the later years and Panevėžys continues to be referred as an industrial city. With the construction of large supermarkets on the western outskirts of the city, a shopping district was formed. Individual houses predominated in the construction of residential houses, with most houses being built in the nearest northern and southern suburbs of Panevėžys. New apartment buildings were built in Ramygala, Margiai, Klaipėda-Projektuotojų, Suvalkų, Pušaloto streets.

=== Bridges ===
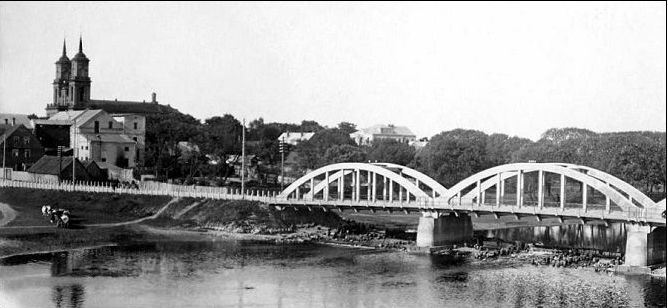
Freedom Bridge, photographed between 1925 and 1940

The first bridge over river Nevėžis was built in the 17th century between Old and New Panevėžys. The description of Kovno Governorate mentions a 128 meters long bridge on poles. In the interwar period, the city had two reinforced concrete bridges and three wooden bridges, which the city municipality were removing in the winters to prevent them from being carried away by ice. Both reinforced concrete bridges, named as Laisvės (Freedom) and Respublikos (Republic), were built in the 1930s. The decks of the Respublikos Bridge were blown up during the World War II, thus it was reconstructed in 1968. The Laisvės Bridge (located in the current Smėlynės Street) with huge arches became too narrow as traffic flows increased, thus it was demolished in 1964 and was replaced by a new uncut system beam reinforced concrete three-span bridge.

During the Soviet era, as the city grew, more bridges were built: the Nemunas Street Bridge (1976), the Ekranas Bridge on J. Biliūno Street (Nevėžis Dam, 1979). The bridge of Savitiškio (now – Vakarinės) Street was built a little earlier, first it was wooden, later it was rebuilt from a reinforced concrete. In the 2000s, the Panevėžys Bypass Bridge was built on the western outskirts of the city (reconstructed in 2019). The city also has three pedestrian bridges across river Nevėžis: at Skaistakalnis, near the Palace of Communities, and in the Culture and Recreation Park (1984, reconstructed in 2015).

In the north-east of Panevėžys, above Senamiesčio Street and the wide railway, a narrow-gauge railway viaduct was built in 1938, which is enlisted in the Register of Cultural Values of the Republic of Lithuania.

=== Parks and squares ===
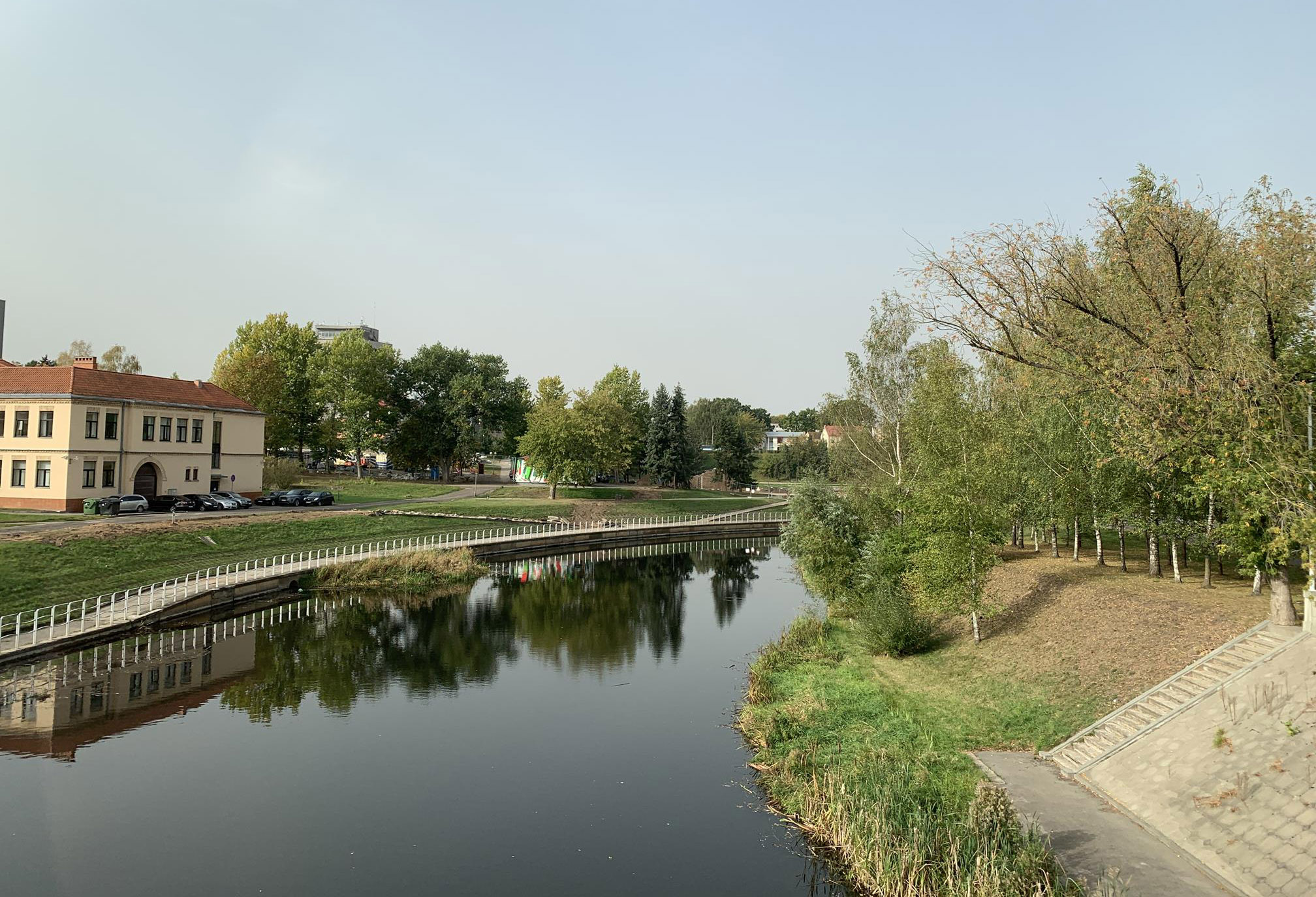
River Nevėžis

The main green spaces of Panevėžys are located in the Nevėžis Valley along the river Nevėžis. Parks and greenery in the city occupy about 700 hectares or 14% of the total area of Panevėžys. The area of greenery per one resident of Panevėžys is almost three times larger than the norm defined by legal acts (25 m^{2}). The largest recreational area in the city is the 39 hectares Culture and Recreation Park (Lithuanian: Panevėžio kultūros ir poilsio parkas). The area of the oldest Skaistakalnis Park – 29.74 hectares, Youth Park (Lithuanian: Jaunimo parkas) – 4.14 hectares. In the west of the city, it is planned to install another, Kniaudiškės Park, the area of which will reach 7.7 hectares.

Other important green areas in the city are Senvagė, Palace of Communities (Lithuanian: Bendruomenių rūmų), 13 January (Lithuanian: Sausio 13-osios), Remembrance (Lithuanian: Atminimo), Povilas Plechavičius squares, A. Baranauskas Park. As well as the greenery of Freedom (Lithuanian: Laisvės), Independence (Lithuanian: Nepriklausomybės), and Volunteers (Lithuanian: Savanorių) squares. Over 6 million euros were invested in renovation of the Freedom Square in 2017–2021. The Independence Square also was renovated with 1.9 million euros investment in 2017–2021.

In 1934–1936, A. Jakštas Avenue was established with cement bricks pavement on the right bank of river Nevėžis. Planted with acacias, it became one of the most beautiful places in Panevėžys in a few years, and was called the Love Avenue by the townspeople. The A. Jakštas Street was newly reconstructed in 2018–2020 for 1.7 million euros.

The main recreational water body of the city is Ekranas Lagoon with place for launching boats, pontoon jetty with place for lowering and raising kayaks, mooring berth, as well as pedestrian and bike paths, recreation and entertainment areas near it.

== Demography ==
=== Demographics evolution ===
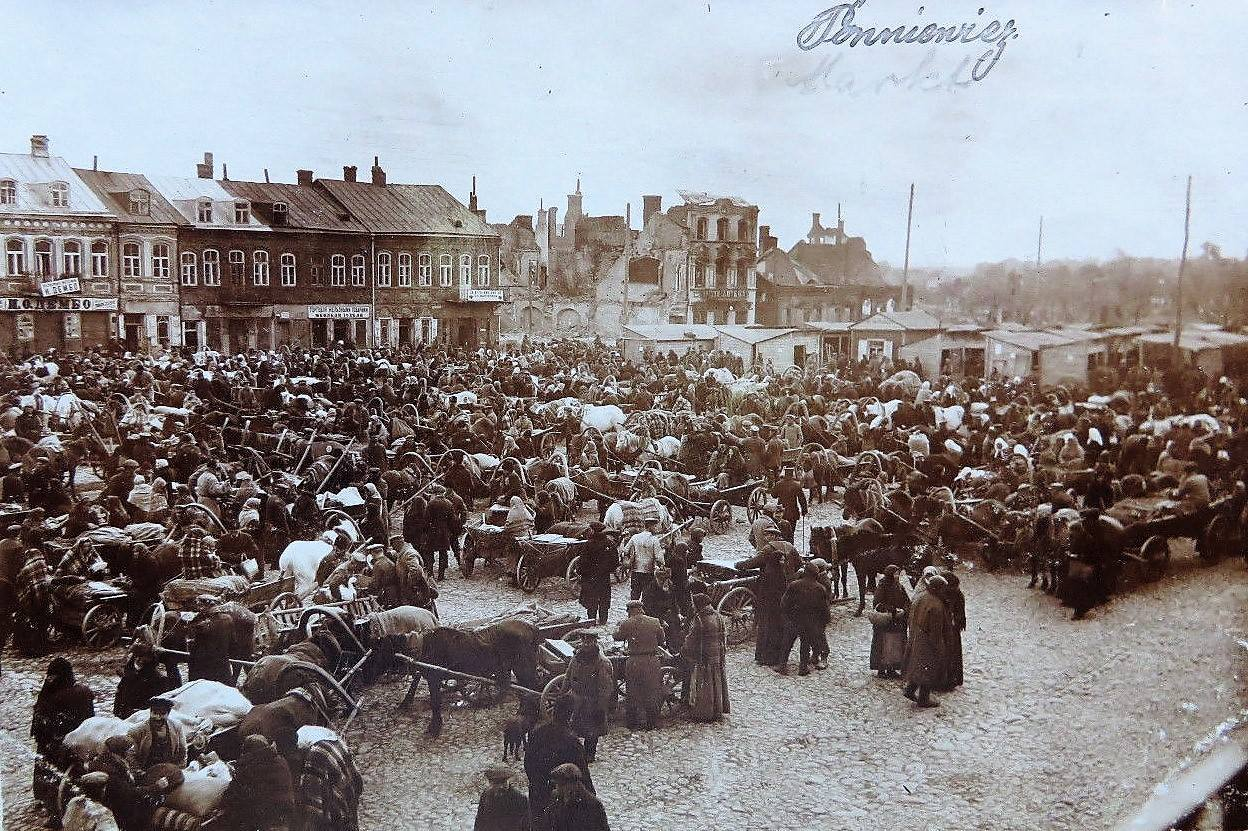
Local market participants at the Market Square of Panevėžys in 1917. The buildings in the background are damaged due to World War I.

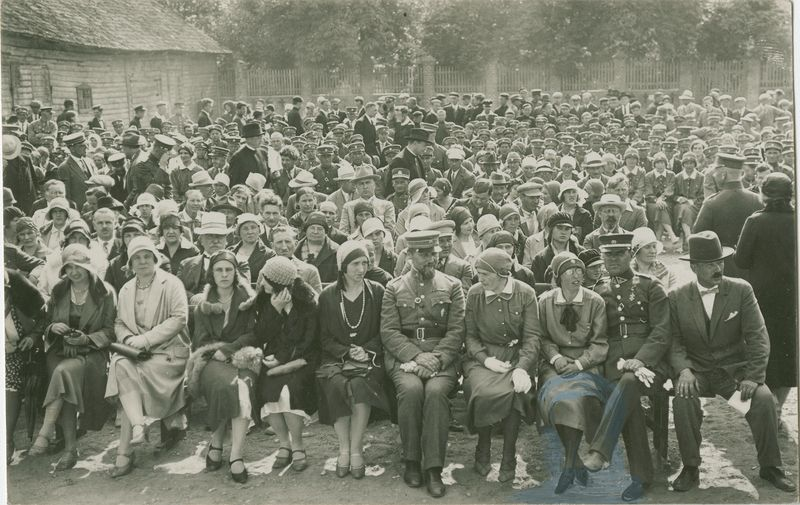
Participants of the songs festival in Panevėžys, commemorating the 500th anniversary of the death of the Lithuanian Grand Duke Vytautas the Great in 1930

A view from the Freedom Square towards the residential areas of the city

A settlement (so-called Old Panevėžys) in the old plain of the Upytė River (left tributary of the Nevėžis River) was known since the 13th century which suffered from the Grand Duchy of Lithuania's wars with the Livonian Order and once the Lithuanians wars with the Livonian Order were finished the settlement and its surrounding region experienced a massive influx of inhabitants, however the settlement did not have town/city status.

At the beginning of the 16th century the settlement of New Panevėžys was established and in the Lithuanian Grand Duke Alexander Jagiellon's letter of September 7, 1503 the name of Panevėžys was mentioned for the first time. The New Panevėžys soon outperformed Old Panevėžys in population development and its inhabitants at the time lived around the Market Square (currently known as Independence Square). The population of New Panevėžys in the middle of the 16th century was ~350 inhabitants, who likely mostly were farmers and some craftsmen, and the town was average-sized in Lithuania. The further development of the population of Panevėžys was influenced by the administration reforms of 1565–1566 which converted Panevėžys into a regional centre. Nevertheless, the 17th–18th centuries wars which caused epidemics (e.g. Great Northern War plague outbreak) and starvation once again limited the population growth of Panevėžys.

In 1795 the Lithuanian statehood was dismantled and Panevėžys came under the Russian Empire control, however this resulted in economic and political stability for Panevėžys which in 1811 was bought from private owners by the Russian authorities and suffered only minor damages during the Napoleonic Wars in 1812 and Polish–Lithuanian uprisings of 1830–1831 and 1863–1864, thus Panevėžys continued developing into a larger city by population and infrastructure. In the early 19th century the population of Panevėžys was 800 inhabitants and according to the first Russian Empire census in 1897 the population of the city of Panevėžys alone reached 13,000 inhabitants, which was largely influenced by the Industrial Revolution and establishment of modern companies (especially significant were those specializing in processing of agricultural products).

In 1918 the statehood of Lithuania was restored and Panevėžys became one of the largest and most important city in Lithuania. In the interwar period (1918–1939) the population of Panevėžys increased from 19,200 to 26,000 and since March 1939 Panevėžys for a short-term became the third-largest city of Lithuania when the Lithuanian port city Klaipėda was annexed by Nazi Germany and Lithuania's historic capital city Vilnius was still controlled by Poland.

The World War II and early post-war years were devastating for the population of Panevėžys as many of its inhabitants were repressed for political reasons, killed, exiled to Siberia. However, later Soviet Communists in the 1960s–1970s made Panevėžys a major Lithuanian industrial centre when large industrial companies (e.g. electronics companies Lietkabelis, Ekranas) were established in the city, therefore the city area increased and in 1959–1979 the population of Panevėžys more than doubled from 41,000 to 101,500 inhabitants. In 1990 the population of the city of Panevėžys alone reached 130,000 inhabitants.

After Lithuania restored its indence on March 11, 1990, the mostly Soviet era industry of Panevėžys significantly suffered due to terminated or restricted ties with the Soviet Union and many Panevėžians emigrated abroad or moved to other Lithuanian cities. In the first quarter of the 21st century the population of Panevėžys continually decreased: 119,749 in 2001, 99,690 in 2011, 89,100 in 2021, 84,392 in 2026. Nevertheless, Panevėžys remain the fifth-largest city in Lithuania by population and is significantly larger than sixth Lithuanian city Alytus.

=== Ethnic composition ===
According to the 2021 census, the ethnic composition of the city of Panevėžys population (89,100 inhabitants) was:

- Lithuanians – 95.95% (85,498)
- Russians – 1.98% (1,767)
- Ukrainians – 0.25% (223)
- Poles – 0.21% (188)
- Belarusians – 0.14% (128)
- Others / did not specify – 1.46% (1302).

== Religion ==
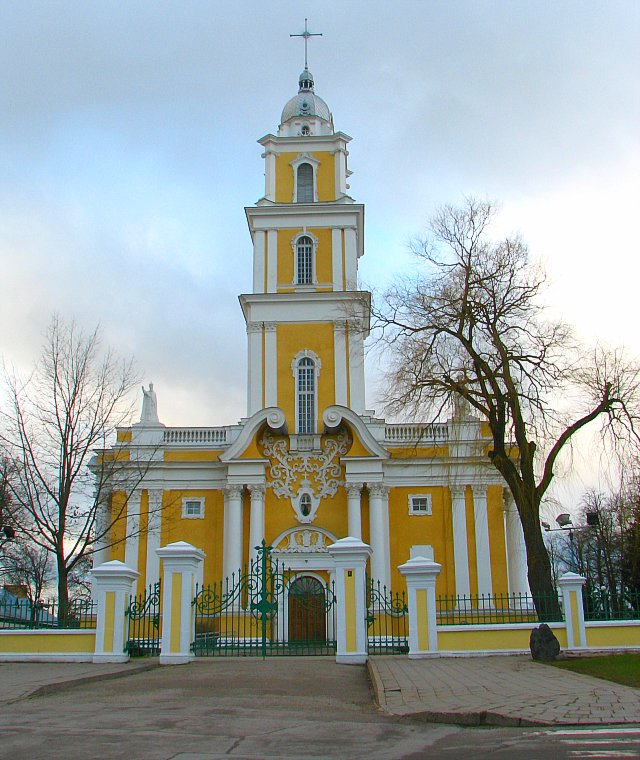
Neo-Baroque Cathedral of Christ the King is the primary Catholic church of the city

According to the religious groups census of 2011, 250,390 residents of the Panevėžys County indicated their religion as: 203,375 – Roman Catholic, 2,525 – Orthodox, 1,787 – Old Believers, 437 – Evangelical Lutheran, 3,091 – Evangelical Reformed, 62 – Sunni Islam, 15 – Judaism, 36 – Greek Catholic, 29 – Karaite Judaism, other – 1,228, irreligious – 16,138, did not specify – 21,667.

In 1507, the first Panevėžys church was built on the right bank of river Nevėžis – a Panevėžys Old Town filial church, belonging to the Ramygala Parish. The church was small, wooden, covered with boards, with a tower and 3 bells, had 3 altars. Near the church there was a rectory and outbuildings, a tavern, a sauna and a brewery. In 1528, it was decided to establish a parish school. An independent Panevėžys Parish was established in 1568. In 1629–1631, pastor Jerzy Tyszkiewicz built a new wooden church. In 1636, Grand Duke Władysław IV Vasa built the Chapel of Saint Casimir of the Vilnius Cathedral and assigned to it manors of the Panevėžys Old Town and Ramygala. Since then, the pastors of Panevėžys and Ramygala have been the pastors of St. Casimir's Chapel, and in Panevėžys and Ramygala there were only their vicars. In 1655, during the Russo-Polish War (1654–1667), the church was greatly damaged: its floors, windows, altars were broken, paintings were stolen, moreover, soon the church was turned into military barracks and slightly later – a hospital. In 1781, the canon of Vilnius Chapter Mikalojus Tiškevičius built a new wooden church on the right bank of river Nevėžis, near New Panevėžys, to which he moved the parish from Old Panevėžys. In 1877–1885, by the care of the pastor Mykolas Chodoravičius, the current St. Peter and St. Paul's Church was built from bricks. Catholic priests of the city (e.g. Kazimieras Paltarokas, Felicijonas Lelis, Jonas Karbauskas, Jonas Balvočius) were active book smugglers during the Lithuanian press ban.

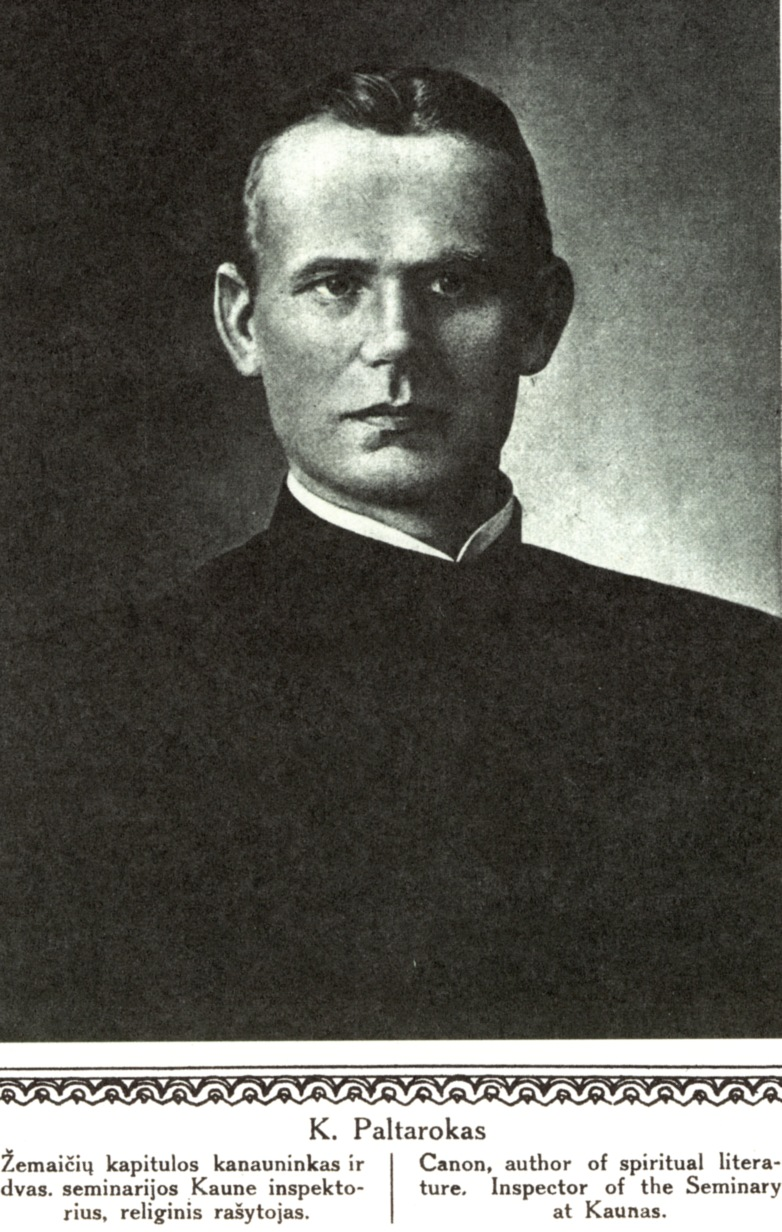
Bishop Kazimieras Paltarokas was an active book smuggler

Monks of the Congregation of Marian Fathers of the Immaculate Conception moved to Panevėžys in 1927 and settled close to the Church of the Holy Trinity; on 15 August 1915 the newly built Marian Chapel was consecrated.

Panevėžys is the seat of the Roman Catholic Diocese of Panevėžys, which was established in 1926. Its primary church is the Christ the King Cathedral, consecrated in 1933. In 1938, construction of Panevėžys Minor Priests Seminary began, however it was never fully completed due to the World War II and was subsequently converted to a gymnasium.

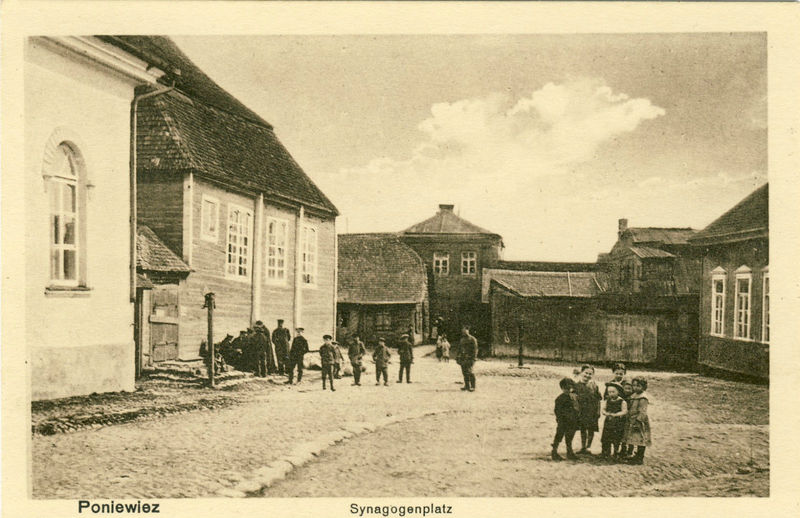
Square of synagogues, 1915

Panevėžys has a rich history of Lithuanian Jews. In 1875, Panevėžys had eight synagogues, possibly the number of the prayer communities was the same. The smaller synagogues were also called houses of prayer or a religious school – they served both functions of these institutions. The houses of prayer could have also been set up in private houses. The prayer community was led by a council consisting of an elder, a teacher, a treasurer, and a rabbi, and took care of the management of synagogues and prayer schools and the organization of charity. After Telšiai, Panevėžys was known as the most significant center of Torah studies. As early as 1897, the Jewish community in the city had one main synagogue, later numbered 8, 7, 12, and perhaps 15 houses of worship, however only small fragments of these buildings have survived to this day. The most important wooden synagogue, built in 1764 or 1794, stood in the area between Elektros and Ukmergės streets, but it burned down at the end of the World War I. Seventeen Jewish houses of worship have already been mentioned in the interwar city. The Jewish population of the city was nearly completely exterminated during the German occupation of Lithuania during World War II.

The Panevėžys Evangelical Lutheran Parish was founded in 1790–1795, before that it was a filial church of the Biržai Parish. The Panevėžys Evangelical Lutheran Church was built in 1845–1850. The church was significantly damaged following the Soviet occupation of Lithuania as the building was nationalized, its tower was demolished and it was converted into a dance club, later – a household goods store. Following the Re-Establishment of the State of Lithuania, the parish and the church were restored.

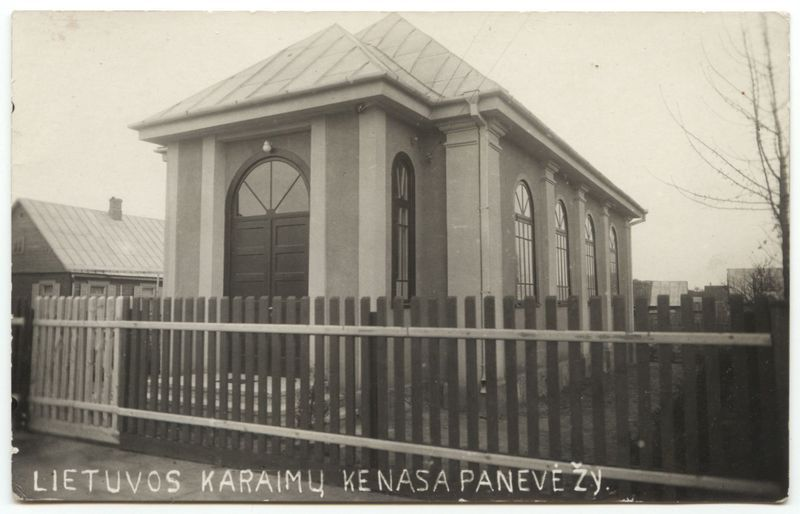
Panevėžys Kenesa, 1939

During the interwar years of the independent state of Lithuania, Panevėžys region became the main residence of the Crimean Karaites. On 3 May 1922, the board for the management of the affairs of the Panevėžys Karaite community was registered. The only houses of worship in the times of interwar Lithuania were in Panevėžys and the Karaites studied in Lithuanian schools. In November 1938, with the help of the Ministry of Education, a kenesa building was built in Panevėžys and celebrations were held. A Karaite priest, a chazanas from Trakai, came to those celebrations along with the Karaites from all over Lithuania. The Karaites of Panevėžys actively participated in the Lithuanian Wars of Independence, and later served in the Lithuanian Armed Forces. Panevėžys became a center of Karaite culture and in 1934, 1936, 1939 the Karaites published three issues of Onarmach (Lithuanian: Pažanga, "Progress") journal; the 1939 edition of the journal had 40 pages and included Maironis' poem, translated into the Karaim language, about the Trakai Island Castle. Also, the houses of the Karaite community were popular in Panevėžys. However, during the Soviet period the Panevėžys Kenesa was closed and later demolished. Currently, there is a small, but active Karaite community in Panevėžys.

== Education ==
=== Primary and secondary education ===
Soon after 1727 the Piarists established a college in Panevėžys, which was the first high school in the city, and because of it Panevėžys became an important centre of education in the region.

On 14 October 1773, the Commission of National Education was created by the Sejm and the King Stanisław August Poniatowski, which supervised universities, schools and was responsible for other educational matters in the Commonwealth. Because of its vast authority and autonomy, it is considered as the first Ministry of Education in European history and an important achievement of the Enlightenment in the Commonwealth. At the time the education province of Lithuania was assigned to be managed by Vilnius University.

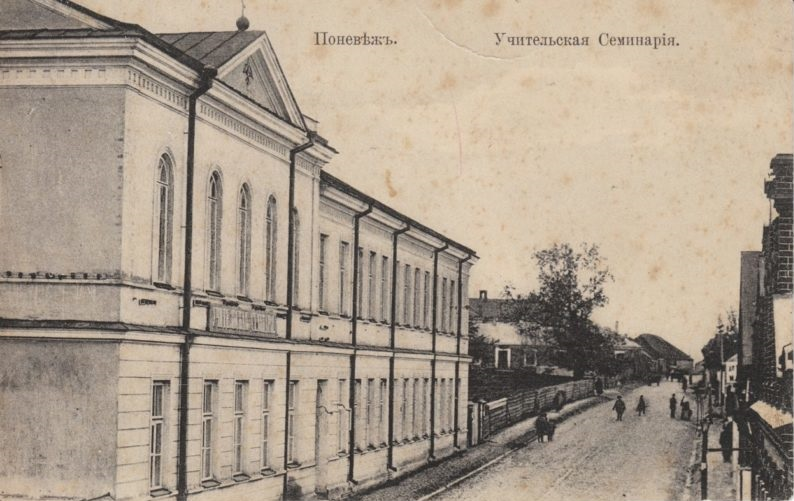
Panevėžys Teachers Seminary, the first high school in the Russian Empire with lectures of Lithuanian language

Following the Third Partition of the Commonwealth, Panevėžys and Lithuania proper became part of the Russian Empire. Only a few primary schools operated in Panevėžys during the Russian rule. On 14 November 1872 the Panevėžys Teachers Seminary was opened because there was not enough teachers for Russian folk schools in the Kovno Governorate and Vilna Governorate in which only Orthodox Christians were allowed to teach. In 1873, the seminary became the first educational institution in the Russian Empire where the Lithuanian language was lectured officially, despite the active Russification and Lithuanian press ban. Moreover, Panevėžys was part of the Kovno Governorate which was one of the leading governorates by population literacy – 55.3%, compared to the average of 19% of population (9 years or older) of the Russian Empire in 1897. Following the Russian Revolution of 1905, Catholics were also allowed to study in the teachers seminary, however few Lithuanians studied in it (e.g. 8 of 132 in 1907) and two-thirds of the students had to be Orthodox Christians. Jonas Jablonskis was the only teacher of Lithuanian origin who taught in the seminary. Until the early 20th century the seminary prepared 400 teachers. During the World War I the seminary was evacuated to Mstsislaw and never returned to Panevėžys.

In 1905, the Ponevezh Yeshiva was established in Panevėžys and historically was one of the most famous yeshivas in the world.

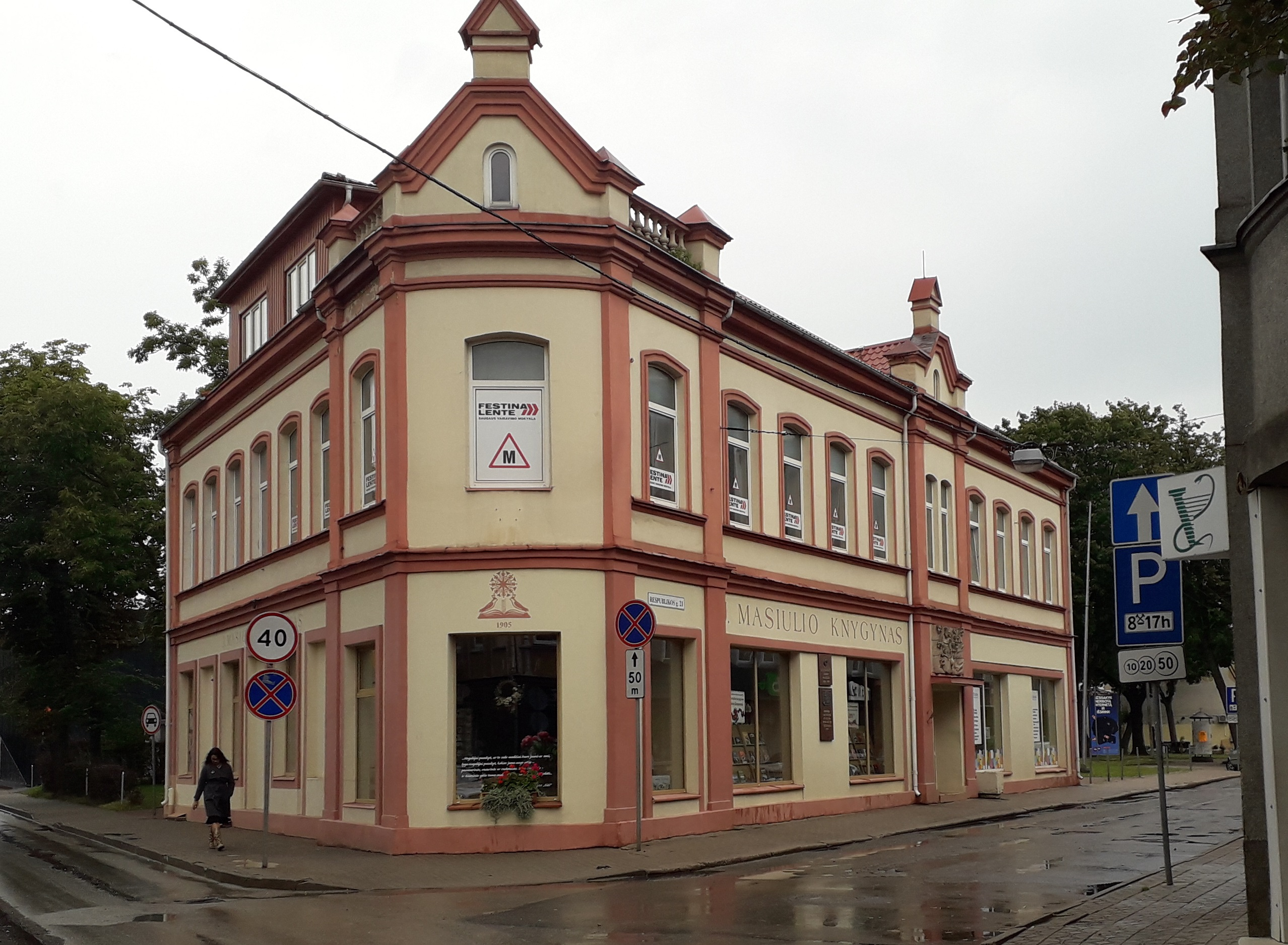
Juozas Masiulis' Bookstore

In 1905, the Juozas Masiulis' Bookstore was opened in a building on the current Respublikos St. which was the first Lithuanian language bookstore in Panevėžys and initially sold banned literature in the Latin script of the Lithuanian language, while following the lifting of the Lithuanian press ban continued legally selling literature in Lithuanian and other languages (e.g. the bookstore offered over 1,000 different titles publications in 1912). The founder of the bookstore, Juozas Masiulis, was a Lithuanian book smuggler and a member of the Garšviai Book Smuggling Society, he was exiled to Siberia twice by the tsarist authorities for selling at the time illegal Lithuanian literature.

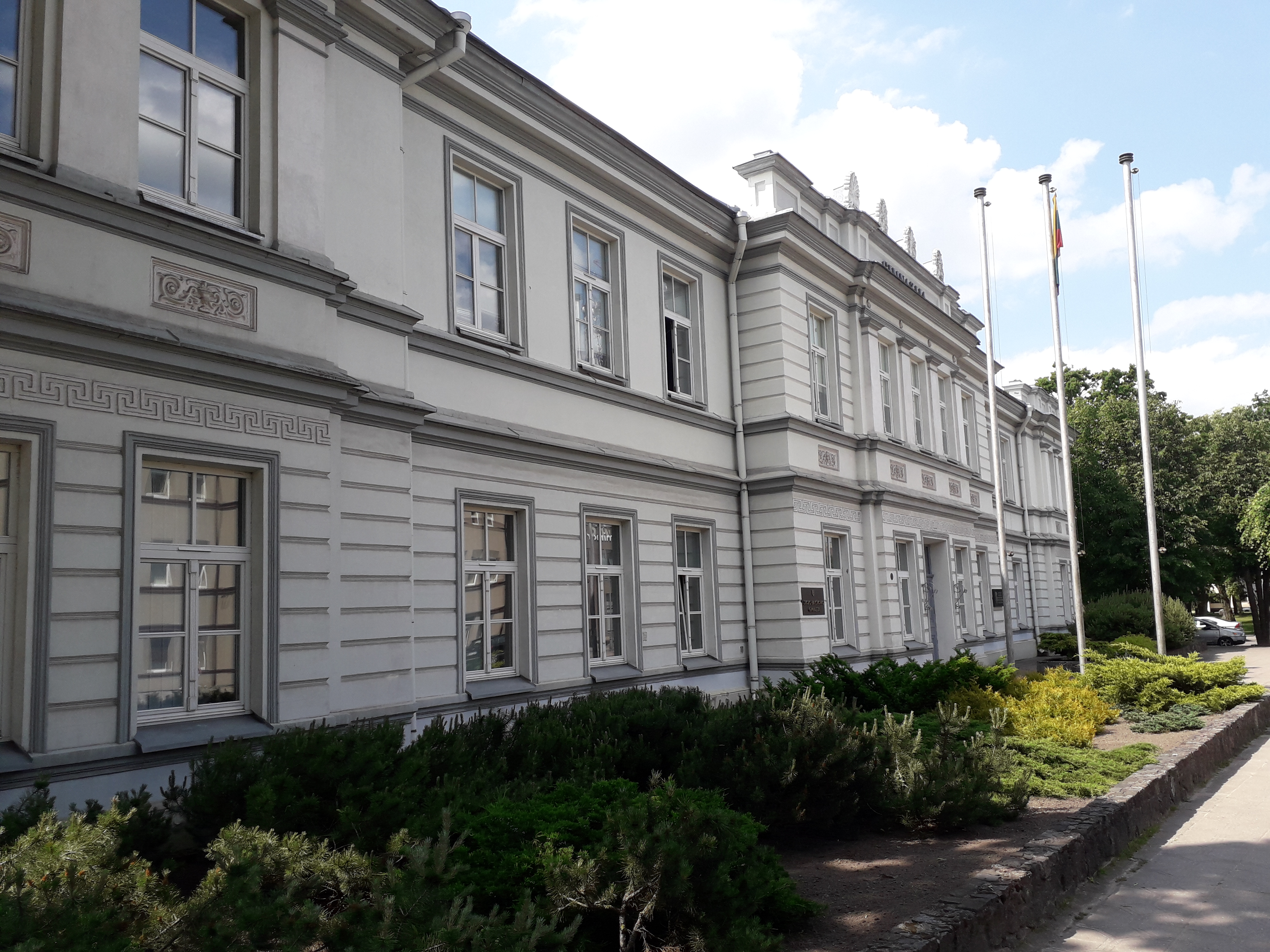
Juozas Balčikonis Gymnasium, the first Lithuanian gymnasium

In 1915, following a reorganization, the Juozas Balčikonis Gymnasium became the first Lithuanian gymnasium in Lithuania's education history and its pupils were taught in Lithuanian language.

Following the restoration of Lithuania's independence in 1918, Panevėžys continued to grow and Lithuanization of education system was implemented which was beneficial for the Lithuanians who constituted the majority of the city's residents (e.g. 53% in 1923). A number of Lithuanian schools and gymnasiums were built to improve the level of education. Also, ethnic minorities schools of Russians, Poles and Jews operated in the city. In 1919, Panevėžys Teachers Seminary was reestablished. In 1928 primary education became mandatory in Panevėžys and in 1931 in Panevėžys County.

On 22 March 1939, following the German annexation of Klaipėda, Klaipėda Pedagogical Institute was moved to Panevėžys and renamed to Panevėžys Pedagogical Institute (graduated by 93 graduates), however in the same year, following the recapture of Lithuanian capital Vilnius, it was moved to Vilnius and renamed to Vilnius Pedagogical Institute.

Currently, Panevėžys has one elementary school, two primary schools, nine progymnasiums, and 15 gymnasiums. Moreover, there are Adult and Youth Training Centre, "Šviesos" Centre for Special Education, Special school – multipurpose center. Most of pupils in Panevėžys later studies in the universities or colleges as Lithuania is one of the world's leading countries in OECD's statistics of population with tertiary education (58.15% of 25–34-year-olds in 2022).

=== Libraries ===
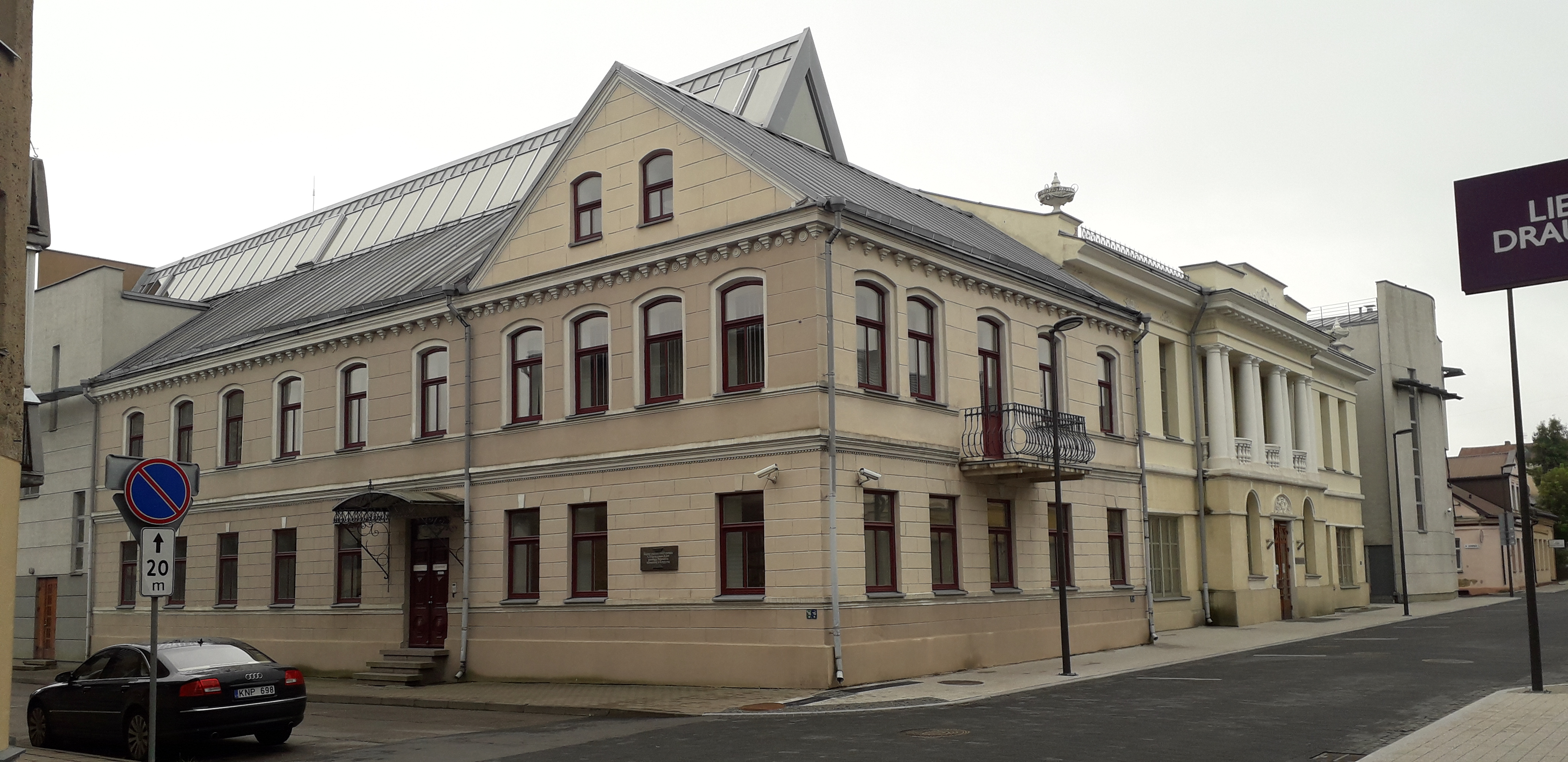
Gabrielė Petkevičaitė-Bitė Library

A number of libraries are located in Panevėžys, with the most notable being the Panevėžys County Gabrielė Petkevičaitė-Bitė Public Library, Panevėžys District Municipal Public Library, and the Panevėžys City Elena Mezginaitė Public Library.

=== Tertiary education ===
Panevėžys never had its own independent university, however there is the Faculty of Technology and Business of Kaunas University of Technology which offer multiple bachelor's and master's degrees studies.

The Panevėžys College, established in 2002, provides college education in three faculties (Biomedicine Sciences, Social Sciences, Technology Sciences) and has over 1,000 students.

== Sport ==
Kalnapilio Arena (formerly Cido Arena)

Panevėžys has for a long-time been a local sports' hub mainly for team sports.

Many famous Lithuanian sportsmen and sportswomen were born in Panevėžys, including: Stasys Šaparnis, Vitalijus Karpačiauskas, Jonas Kazlauskas, Sigita Strečen, Petras Šiurskas, Vidmantas Urbonas, Simonas Bilis, Justinas Kinderis, Danas Rapšys, Raimundas Sargiūnas, Juras Sokolovas.

The largest multifunctional arena in Panevėžys, Kalnapilio Arena, formerly known as Cido Arena, hosted the Eurobasket 2011 group matches.

The city is home-town to some well-known Lithuanian athletes as well as sports clubs. The most successful football club in its history is FK Ekranas which is a seven-time Lithuanian Football League and is considered one of the most successful in recent (post-independence) Lithuanian history, however it went bankrupt in 2015. After FK Ekranas bankruptcy the strongest football club is FK Panevėžys which is playing in Lithuanian top division A Lyga.

Lietkabelis Panevėžys, a basketball club established in 1964, has also recently gained prominence in Lithuanian basketball scene, becoming the third most successful basketball club by medals in Lithuania since 2017 only behind the Lithuanian basketball powerhouses Žalgiris Kaunas and Rytas Vilnius.

Panevėžio Viking Malt handball club is a two time Lithuanian champion.

== Panevėžys City Municipality ==
Panevėžys, situated in the centre of Aukštaitija region, is sometimes called the capital of the region. It is a municipality on itself (Panevėžys City Municipality) and is also the capital of Panevėžys District Municipality, and Panevėžys County. The coat of arms with the red gate was adopted and formally approved in 1993.

== Transportation ==
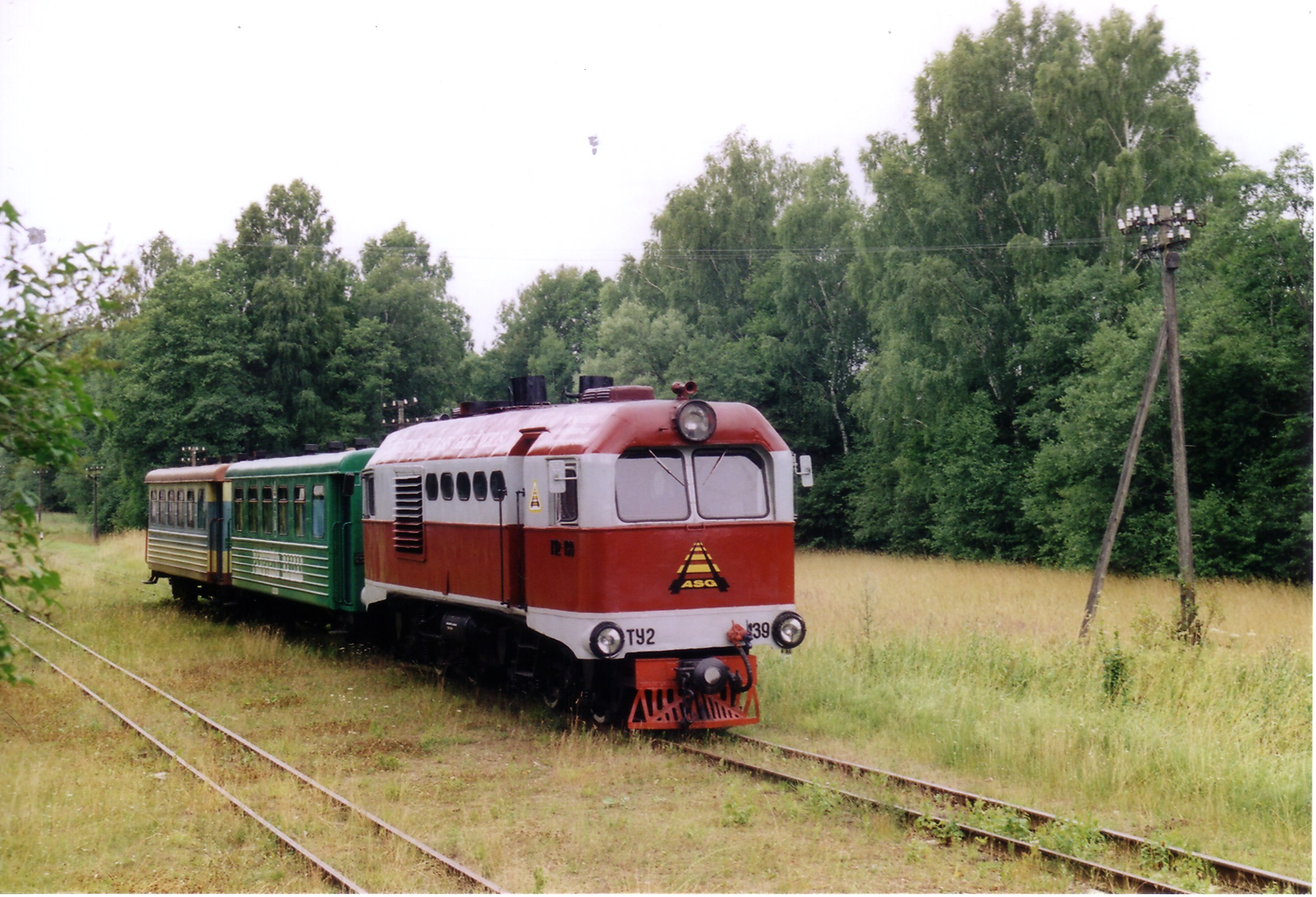
Preserved Aukštaitija narrow gauge railway

During the interwar period, Panevėžys was one of the leading Lithuanian cities in streets management: there were only two first-tier cities in Lithuania with more paved streets than unpaved ones – Panevėžys and Vilkaviškis. However, Panevėžys, being larger, had significantly more paved streets. Sidewalks were also being built along the streets. Initially, the streets were paved with plain stones, but in the 1930s the central streets were already paved with hewn stones. In 1935 out of 40 kilometers of city's streets in total of 26 kilometers were paved. Country roads were also being paved: to Berčiūnai (5.4 km; 1933–1934) and Velžys, towards Ukmergė (3.6 km; 1935). Unfortunately, none of these pavements in Panevėžys has survived to this day as during the Soviet era, all paved streets were covered with asphalt.

"Panevėžio autobusų parkas" Ltd. is serving 16 Panevėžys city routes with 44 buses running. Total urban route network consists of 136.8 km (85.0 mi). Network is equipped with 223 passengers' bus stops.

Additionally, Panevėžys is home to a railway station that currently serves passenger trains to Šiauliai, and formerly trains on the now-truncated Aukštaitija narrow gauge railway.

The Panevėžys Air Base is located 6 km (3.73 mi) east of Panevėžys.

Current services
Preceding station	LTG Link	Following station
Gustonys towards Mažeikiai	Mažeikiai—Panevėžys	Terminus
Former services
Terminus	Aukštaitija narrow gauge railway (closed 1996)	Taruškos towards Rubikiai
Future services
Preceding station	Rail Baltica	Following station
Kaunas	Rail Baltica	Riga, Latvia
Kaunas	Rail Baltica	Riga Airport

== Notable residents ==
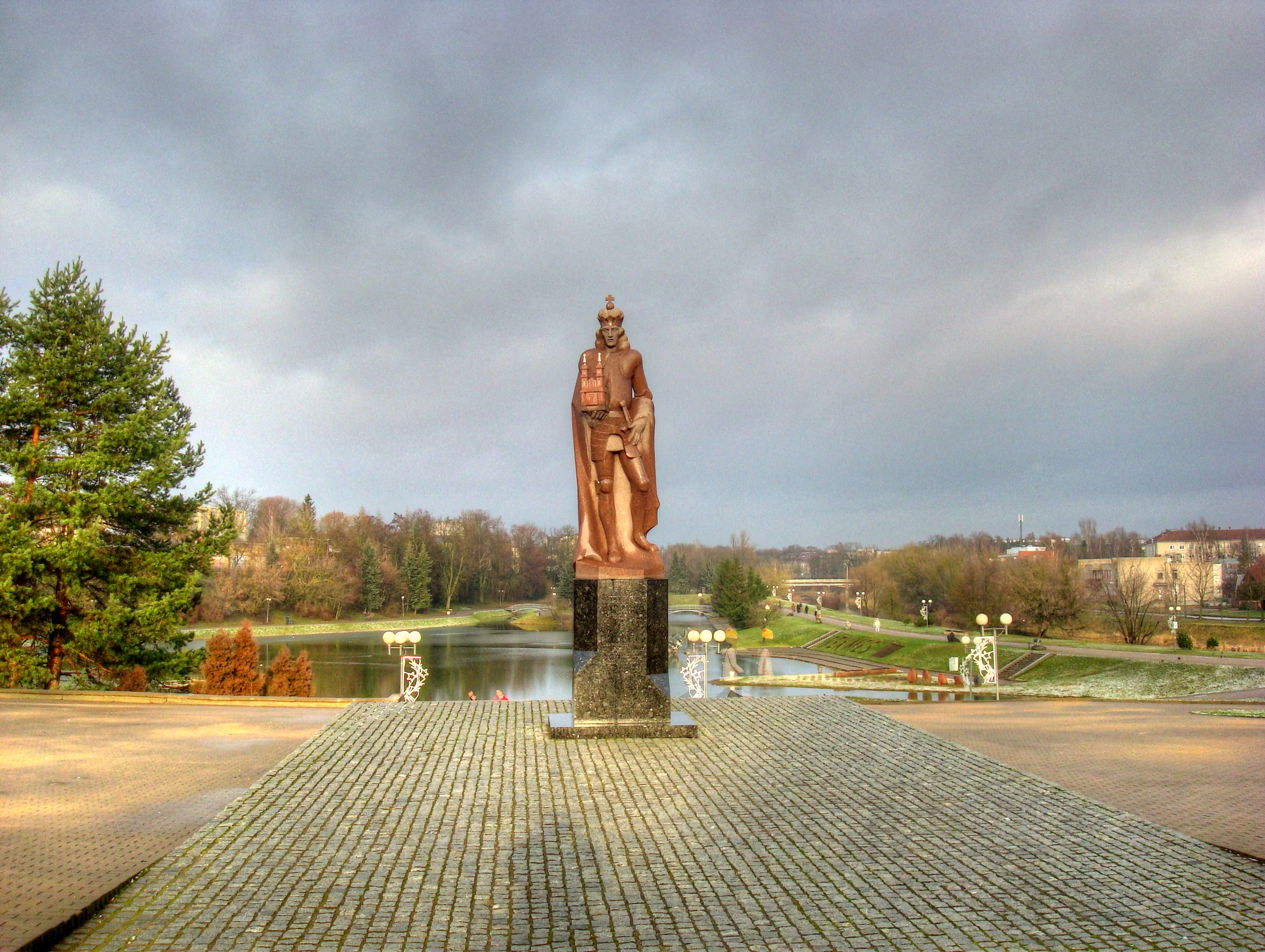
Monument of the Grand Duke Alexander Jagiellon

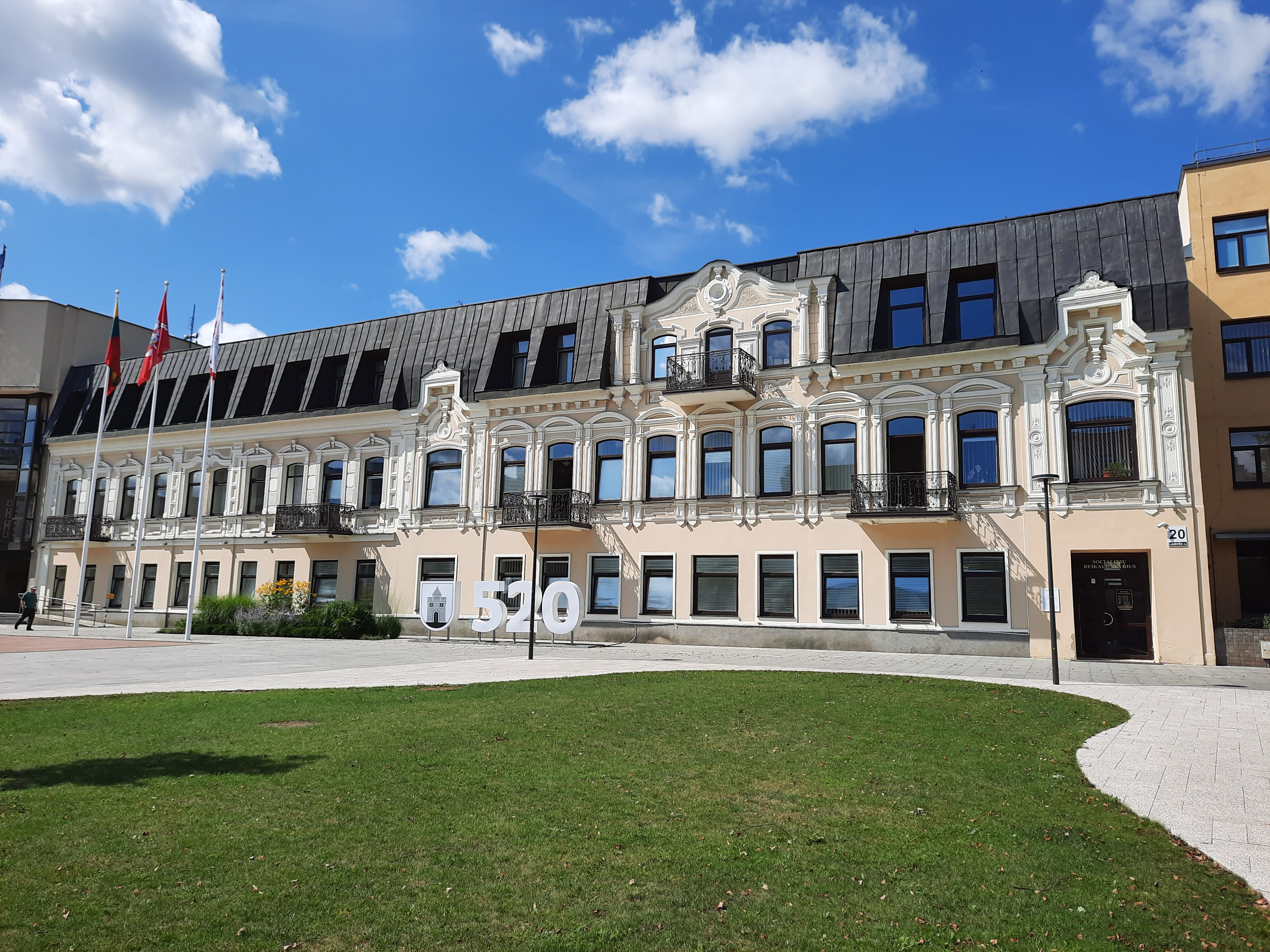
Headquarters of the Panevėžys City Municipality in Freedom Square

- Gabrielė Petkevičaitė-Bitė (1861–1943), educator, writer, and activist
- John Mill (1870–1952), one of the founders of the Jewish Labour Bund
- Fannina W. Halle (1881–1963), Austrian-American art historian and sociologist
- Yosef Shlomo Kahaneman (1886–1969), Rabbi and rosh yeshiva of the Ponevezh Yeshiva
- Jonas Variakojis (1892–1963), Lieutenant-Colonel of the Lithuanian Armed Forces, participant in the Lithuanian Wars of Independence, Minister of National Defence, 1928 and 1930.
- Benjamin Zuskin (1899–1952), Russian stage and movie actor, murdered 1952 upon Stalin's orders; see Night of the Murdered Poets
- Juozas Miltinis (1907–1994), theater director
- Donatas Banionis (1924–2014), stage and film actor and theatre director
- Vidmantas Bačiulis (1940–2022), screenwriter, film and television film director
- Radži (born 1987), singer, real name is Radžis Aleksandrovičius

=== Sport ===
- Darius Grigalionis (born 1977), backstroke swimmer, competed in three Summer Olympics
- Mindaugas Lukauskis (born 1979), basketball player, competed at the 2008 Summer Olympics
- Simas Skinderis (born 1981), football goalkeeper, played about 230 games
- Ignatas Konovalovas (born 1985), professional cyclist
- Danas Rapšys (born 1995), swimmer, a two-time Olympian
- Andrius Šidlauskas (born 1997), swimmer, competed at the 2016 and 2020 Summer Olympics
- Tomas Navikonis (born 2003), swimmer, competed at the 2024 Summer Olympics

== Twin towns – sister cities ==
Panevėžys is twinned with:

- Daugavpils, Latvia
- Gabrovo, Bulgaria
- Kalmar, Sweden
- Kolding, Denmark
- Lublin, Poland
- Lünen, Germany
- Maramureș, Romania
- Rakvere, Estonia
- Székesfehérvár, Hungary
- (Georgia (country)) Rustavi, Georgia
- Toyohashi, Japan
- Vinnytsia, Ukraine
- Ramla, Israel

The city was previously twinned with:

- Kaliningrad, Russia
- Mytishchi, Russia
- Vitebsk, Belarus
- Goes, Netherlands

== Significant depictions in popular culture ==
- Panevėžys is one of the starting towns of Lithuania in the turn-based strategy game Medieval II: Total War: Kingdoms.

== See also ==
- Bnei Brak
- Ponevezh yeshiva
