= Evangelical Lutheran Church, Panevėžys =

Lutheran church in Lithuania

Panevėžys Evangelical Lutheran Church Panevėžio evangelikų liuteronų bažnyčia
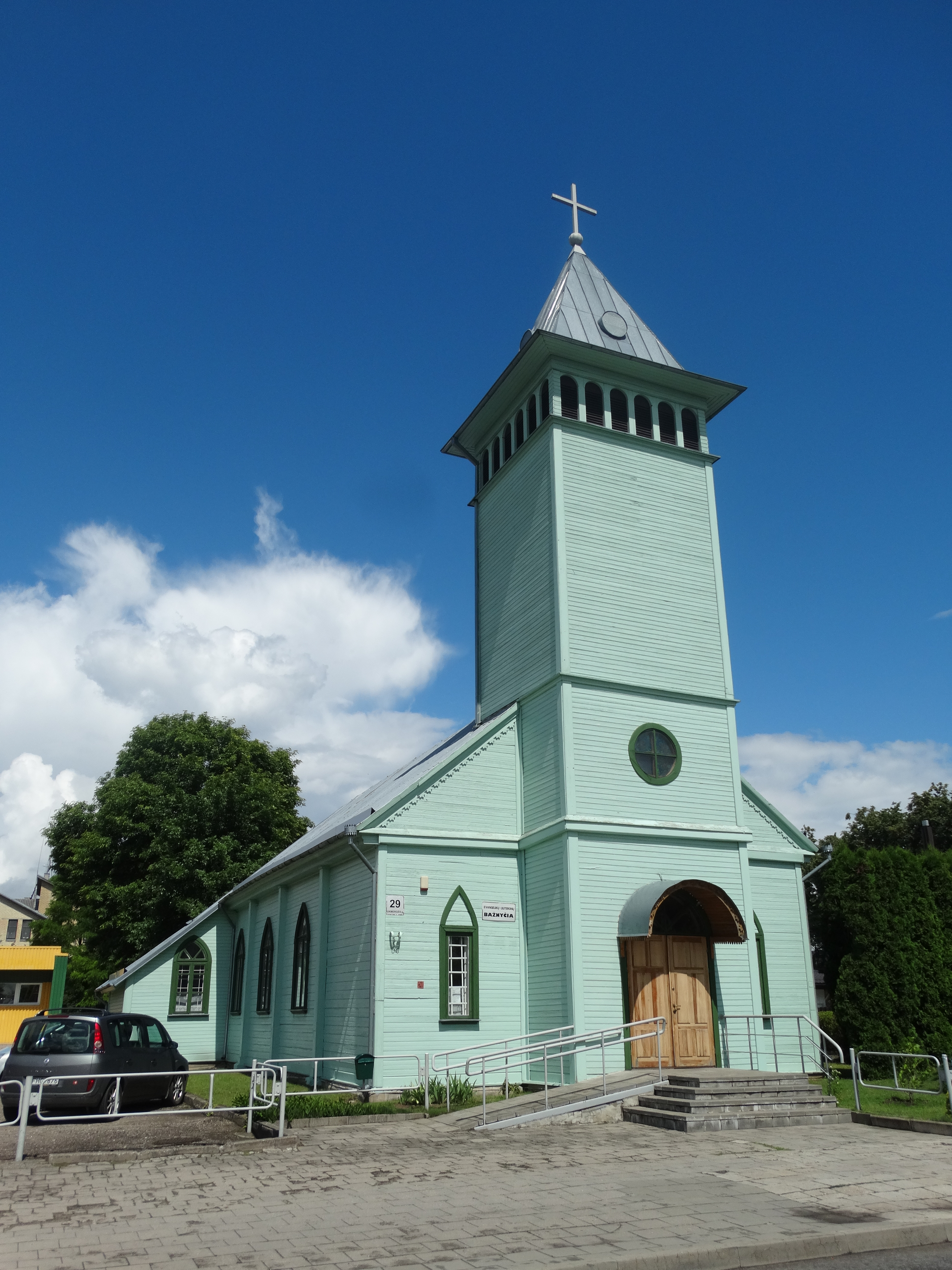
- Front façade of Evangelical Lutheran Church

Religion
- Affiliation: Evangelical Lutheran
- Leadership: Lithuanian Evangelical Lutheran Church

Location
- Location: Panevėžys, Lithuania
- Interactive map of Panevėžys Evangelical Lutheran Church; Panevėžio evangelikų liuteronų bažnyčia
- Coordinates: 55°43′41.97″N 24°22′18.85″E

Architecture
- Type: Church
- Groundbreaking: 1845
- Completed: 1850
- Materials: Wood

Website
- Liuteronai.lt

The Panevėžys Evangelical Lutheran Church (Lithuanian: Panevėžio evangelikų liuteronų bažnyčia) is an Evangelical Lutheran church in Panevėžys, Lithuania. The current church was built in 1845–1850, however the Panevėžys Evangelical Lutheran Parish was founded in 1790–1795.

== Gallery ==
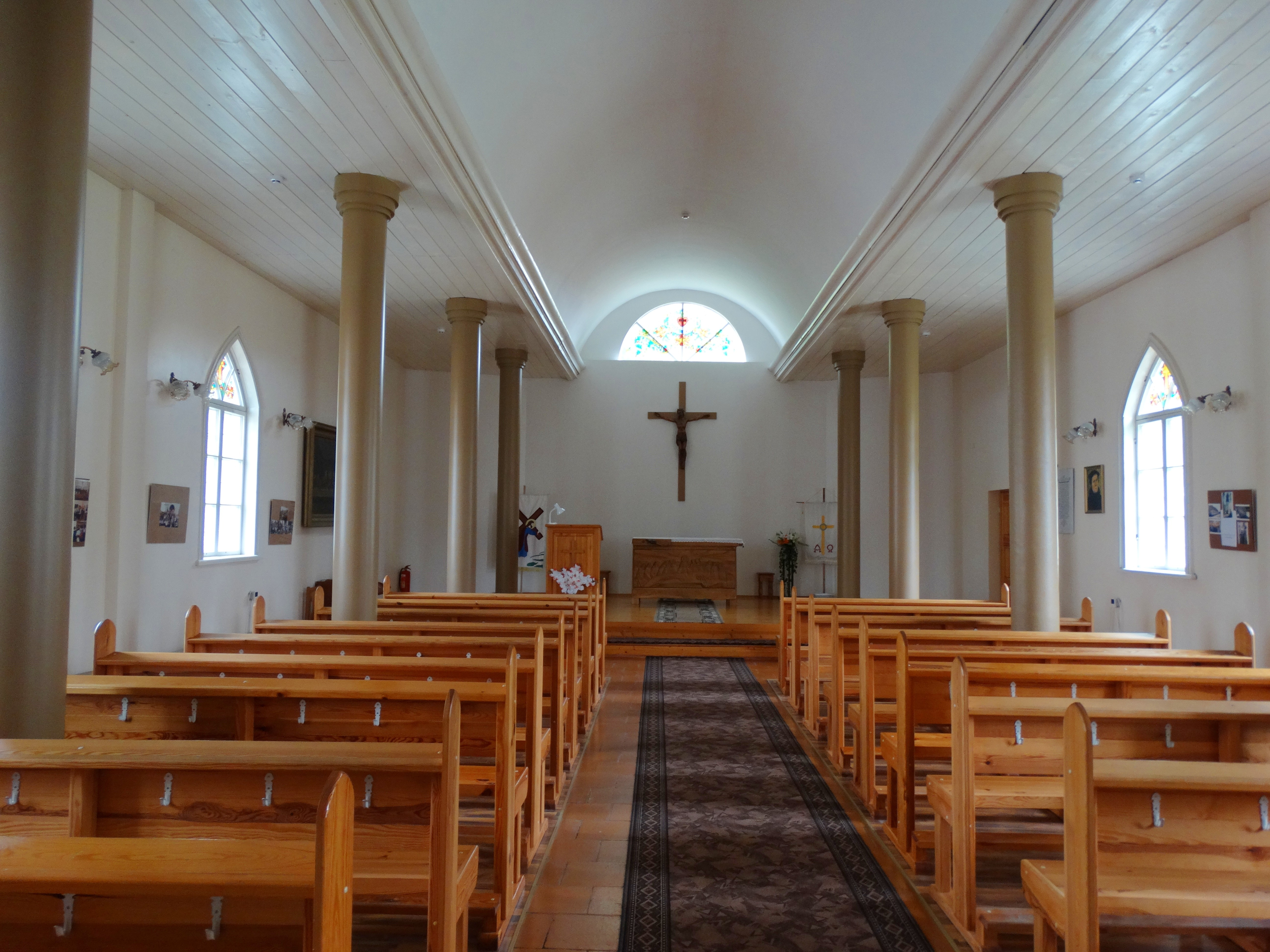
Interior of the church

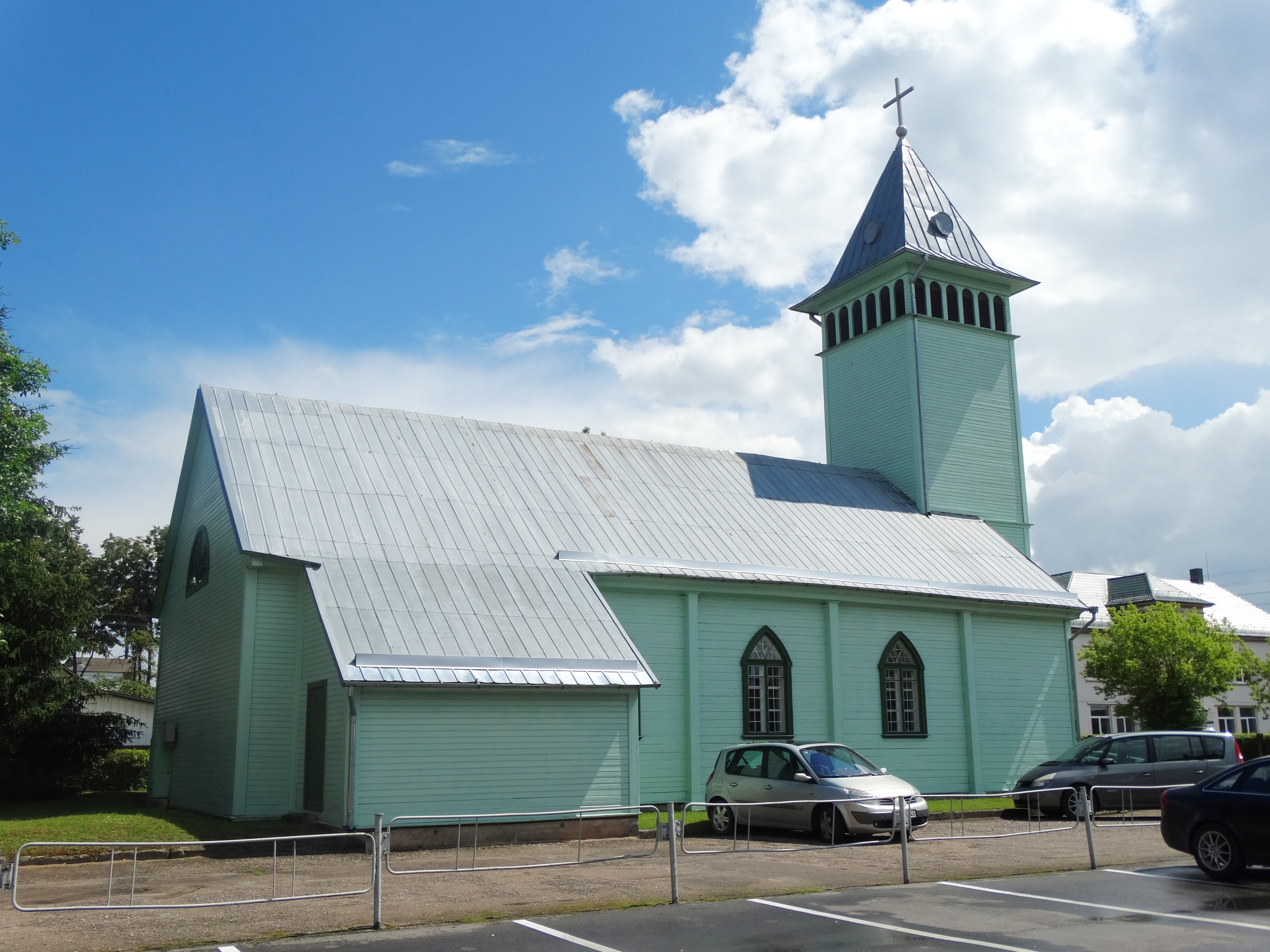
Side view of the church

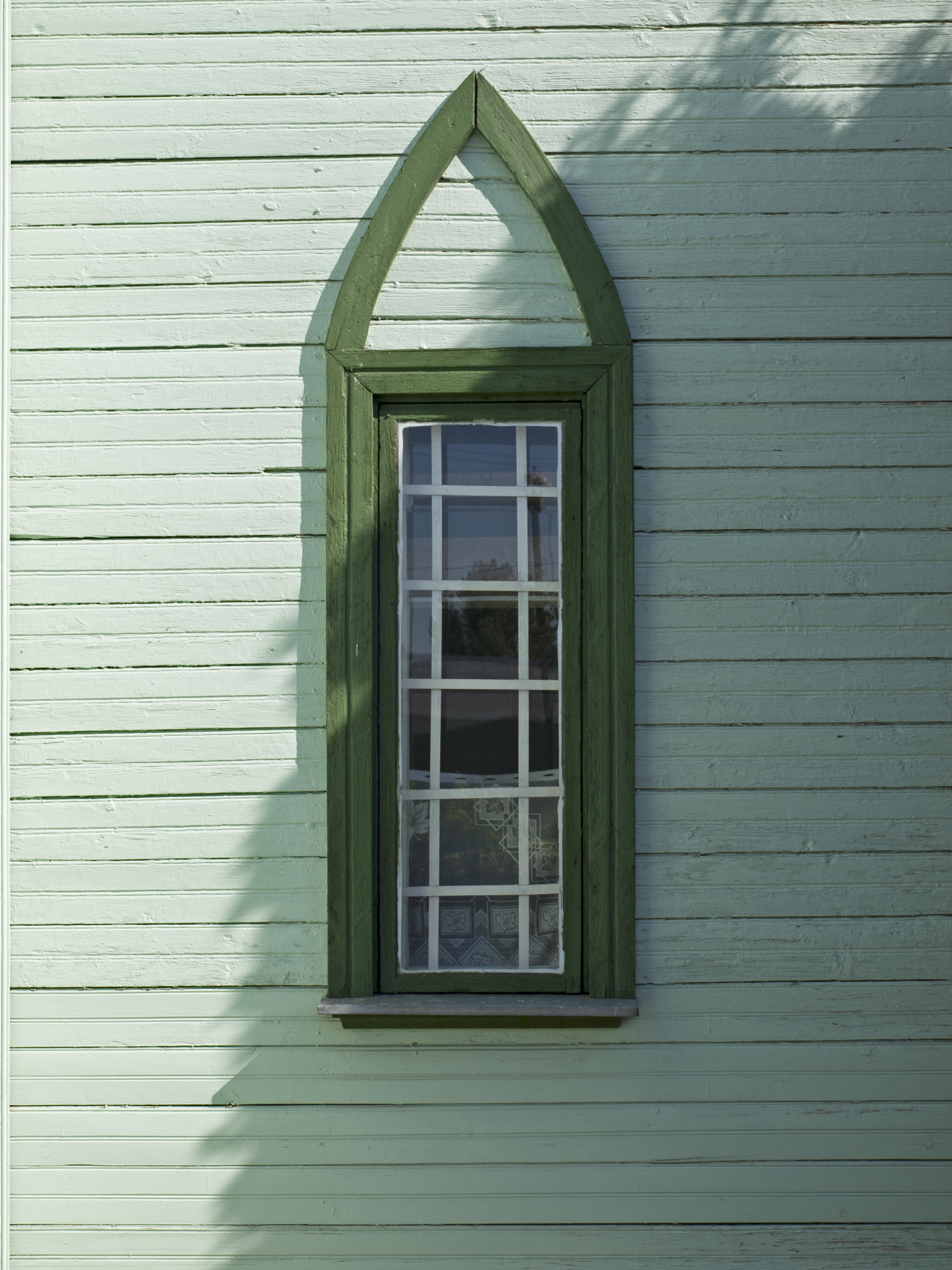
One of the windows of the church

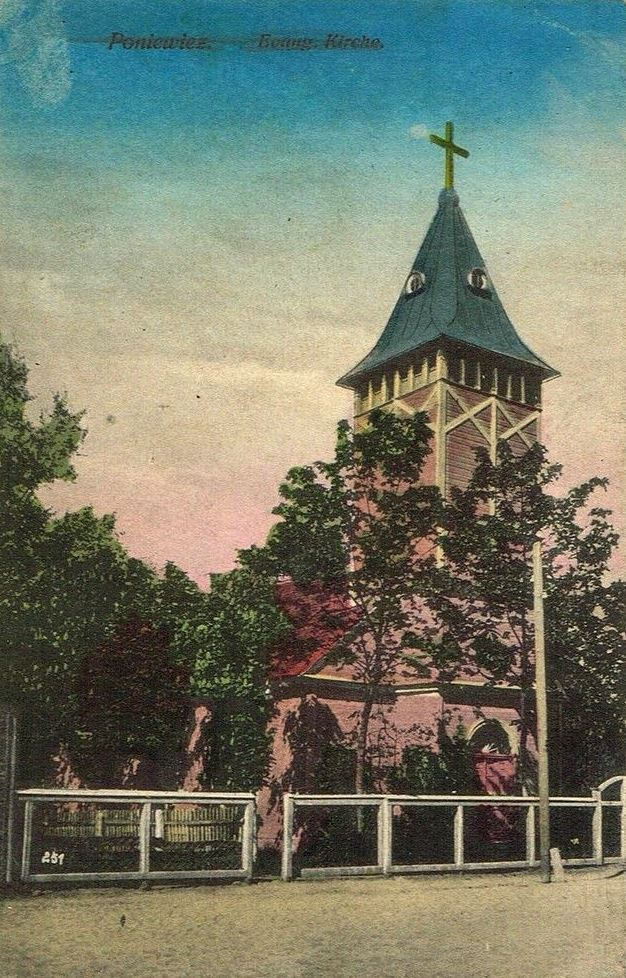
Photography of the church in 1917
