= Fannina W. Halle =

Austrian-American art historian and sociologist (1881–1963)

Fannina W. Halle (née Fannina Borisovna Rubinstein; October 26, 1881, Panevėžys, Kovno Governorate – December 14, 1963, New York City, US) was an Lithuanian-born Austrian-American art historian and sociologist, known for the works "Women in Soviet Russia" and "Women in the Soviet East". Halle immigrated to the United States in 1940.
