= Vilija (company) =

Vilija (Lithuanian: Vilniaus ūkiškųjų mašinų fabriko bendrovė „Vilija“) was a manufacturing company based in Vilnius. It was established in 1911 and produced agricultural iron tools such as ploughs and harrows. It was the first larger enterprise established in Vilnius by Lithuanians. The factory permanently ceased operations in July 1920.

== Background ==
Engineer Petras Vileišis established an ironwork workshop in 1900. It produced various industrial items (cisterns, caissons, parts for iron bridges, railroad switches, etc.) and smaller consumer products (fences, memorial crosses, lanterns, etc.). Majority of its business came from Russian government contracts. Its larger projects included the metal framework for the Halė Market and the decorative elements for the Vileišis Palace. It employed almost exclusively Lithuanian workers. It was located near the Vilnius Railway Station (present-day Paneriai Street) and had its own railway connection to transport the heavy products. In 1906, Jonas Basanavičius lent 19,000 rubles to Vileišis who offered his workshop as a security. Vileišis faced financial difficulties and had to sell the workshop which became the basis of the Vilija factory.

== Operations ==
The company was formally established on 29 April 1911 with a goal of providing agricultural tools to Lithuanian farmers. Its main shareholders at the time were Vileišis, Basanavičius, Jonas Smilgevičius, printer Jurgis Pesys, and clerk Andrius Dubinskas. They offered shares to others and in the first three months attracted 36 investors that contributed 62,000 rubles of capital. Vilija continued to offer shares to new investors. When Basanavičius visited United States in 1913, he not only collected donations for the Lithuanian Scientific Society but also sold shares of Vilija (he sold shares for $3,000 in Chicago alone). By early 1915, Vilija had 141 shareholderss and capital of 122,775 rubles.

Starting in 1912, the factory was directed by Jonas Smilgevičius and the company also sold imported goods (machinery, fertilizers, seeds). It had sales representatives in Kaunas, Panevėžys, Telšiai, Utena, Joniškis, Pikeliai. In 1913, it had 36 workers. Its profit for 1912 was 4,791 rubles and 6,684 rubles for the next 18 months. In 1912, Vilija's products won three silver medals at the agricultural exhibition in Rostov.

Basanavičius devoted substantial effort to the factory and its finances turning it into not only a profitable enterprise, but also one that strengthened the Lithuanian nation. It employed only Lithuanians and donated part of its profit to various Lithuanian societies, such as the Lithuanian Scientific Society, Lithuanian Art Society, and Saulė Educational Society. He further envisioned a cooperative that would help improve and modernize Lithuanian agriculture.

== Disestablishment ==
During World War I, the company produced iron hospital beds for the Red Cross and field kitchens for the Russian Imperial Army. In September 1915, Vilnius was taken over by the German Army and the factory was hastily evacuated to Smolensk. After the October Revolution, the factory was nationalized and later named after Mikhail Kalinin. The present-day KMD Factory of road machinery in Smolensk traces its roots to Vilija.

The factory in Vilnius was revived in February 1919. At that time it had 12 employees and received an order for harrow-teeth and axes from the Commissariat of Agriculture of the Lithuanian Soviet Socialist Republic. In May 1919, after Vilnius was captured by Poles, the Polish Army took away most of its inventory; the losses were calculated at 184,000 rubles. The factory was requisitioned for military aviation needs in January 1920 and the equipment was removed in July 1920 (just before the city fell to the Soviet Union). The factory was never reestablished though Vilija retained the ownership of the real estate.
