= Basanavičius =

Basanavičius is the masculine form of a Lithuanian family name. Its feminine forms are: Basanavičienė (married woman or widow) and Basanavičiūtė (unmarried woman). The polish-language equivalent is Basanowicz.

The surname may refer to:

- Jonas Basanavičius, Lithuanian political activist, proponent of Lithuania's National Revival movement
- Vincas Basanavičius, Lithuanian folklorist
