= Petras Vileišis =

Lithuanian engineer and publisher (1851–1926)

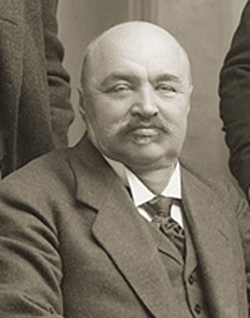
- Petras Vileišis in 1904
- Born: 25 January 1851; Mediniai, Kovno Governorate, Russian Empire
- Died: 12 August 1926 (aged 75); Palanga, Lithuania
- Burial place: Rasos Cemetery
- Education: Šiauliai Gymnasium; St. Petersburg University; Emperor Alexander I Institute of Transport Engineers
- Occupations: Railroad engineer, publisher
- Known for: Publisher of Vilniaus žinios
- Movement: Lithuanian National Revival
- Board member of: Lithuanian Scientific Society
- Children: Vytautas Vileišis
- Relatives: Brothers Jonas Vileišis and Antanas Vileišis

Petras Vileišis (25 January 1851 – 12 August 1926) was a prominent Lithuanian engineer specializing in the construction of railroad bridges. He was very active in Lithuanian public life and together with his brothers Jonas and Antanas became one of the key figures of the Lithuanian National Revival.

He studied mathematics at St. Petersburg University and railroad construction at the Emperor Alexander I Institute of Transport Engineers. For about two decades, Vileišis designed and constructed various railroad bridges across the Russian Empire amassing a substantial personal fortune. In 1899, he returned to Lithuania and settled in Vilnius where he built Vileišis Palace and established the first Lithuanian-language daily newspaper Vilniaus žinios as well as a Lithuanian printing press, bookstore, and ironwork factory which later became Vilija. None of these activities were profitable and by 1908 he had exhausted his savings. He then returned to Russia to work on railway bridges for another decade. After World War I, Vileišis returned to now independent Lithuania in 1921 and briefly served as the Minister of Transport in the government of Prime Minister Ernestas Galvanauskas. Vileišis died suddenly while on vacation in Palanga in 1926.

Vileišis was very active in Lithuanian public life. Already as a student, he published a handwritten four-page newsletter Kalvis melagis which is the first known Lithuanian periodical in the Russian Empire. Due to an error by the state censors, he managed to get approvals to publish four Lithuanian booklets despite the Lithuanian press ban. When the censorship office caught on the error, Vileišis published at least 55 books in East Prussia and United States that were smuggled into Lithuania. Most of these books were educational texts for the common people. He also continuously petitioned and lobbied various Russian officials, including Minister of Finance Sergei Witte and Governor-General of Vilnius Pyotr Sviatopolk-Mirsky, to get the press ban lifted. His brother Jonas even claimed that Vileišis spent considerable sums in bribing Russian officials to get the ban lifted in 1904. When the ban was lifted, Vileišis hurried to establish the daily newspaper Vilniaus žinios and a Lithuanian printing press. The newspaper's staff was instrumental in organizing the Great Seimas of Vilnius in 1905. Vileišis also supported other Lithuanian activities, including the first exhibition of Lithuanian art which was hosted at his house.

== Biography ==
=== Education ===
Vileišis was born on 25 January [O.S. 13 January] 1851 in the village of Mediniai near Pasvalys into a family of Lithuanian royal peasants who were free of serfdom. According to family history, they owned one volok of land and frequently traveled to Riga to sell flax, grain, fruits. Vileišis was the eldest of eleven children, but only six sons and two daughters reached adulthood. All sons received education; Petras became an engineer, Anupras assistant to Petras, Antanas a doctor, Juozas a Catholic priest, Jonas a lawyer, and Kazimieras inherited the family farm. Vileišis family hired a tutor (daraktorius) who prepared Petras for Panevėžys Gymnasium. However, the gymnasium was closed after the Uprising of 1863 and Vileišis enrolled into the Šiauliai Gymnasium in January 1866. He was a gifted student, particularly in math, and took additional private lessons in French and German. After the uprising, the gymnasium implemented various Russification policies, but according to future playwright Gabrielius Landsbergis-Žemkalnis who studied at the gymnasium at the same time it was Vileišis who encouraged him to speak Lithuanian. According to the memoirs of his brother Jonas, Vileišis would rather use a French prayer book than a Lithuanian prayer book printed in the Cyrillic script. He graduated in 1870 with a golden medal for academic excellence.

Vileišis was then admitted to the Faculty of Mathematics and Physics of St. Petersburg University but only as an audit student. He became a full student in the second year. His tuition fees were waived and he received several stipends. Unlike many students, it appears that Vileišis did not struggle financially and made a decent living tutoring others. After graduation in 1874, he applied for a job as a gymnasium teacher position but was rejected because of his Roman Catholic faith (various Russification policies discriminated against Catholics who were deemed to be unreliable after the Uprising of 1863). Vileišis earned a living as a freelance tutor and translator. Vileišis knew several foreign languages, including Greek, Latin, French, German, English, in addition to "local" languages of Lithuanian, Russian, and Polish. After two years of such living, in August 1876, Vileišis was admitted to the Emperor Alexander I Institute of Transport Engineers. At the time, Russian Empire was investing into its railway network and the diploma promised a well paying engineering job. Vileišis chose the specialty of building caissons used to work on the foundations of a bridge pier. He graduated with distinction in 1881 and was assigned as assistant to the director of the Moscow–Kurks Railroad.

=== Bridge engineer ===
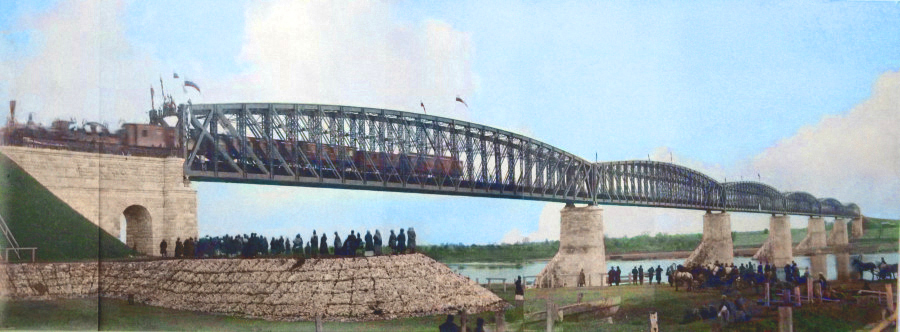
Opening of the Ufa Rail Bridge in 1888

In May 1882, Vileišis was sent to work on the railway drawbridge across the Don in Rostov-on-Don. A year later, he was reassigned to work on the Vilnius–Rivne line of the Polesie Railway. As part of this assignment, he was sent to Belgium to inspect rails and other metal products that were ordered for the construction of the railroad. He found almost half of the product to be inadequate and spent about eight months arranging replacements in Belgium and England. This gave him time to travel, including to France. Over three years, Vileišis oversaw completion of about 20 kilometres (12 mi) of railway and construction of a bridge across the Pripyat. In March 1885, he was transferred to work on the Samara–Ufa line of the Kuybyshev Railway and build the Ufa Rail Bridge across the Belaya. The bridge spanned 650 metres (2,130 ft) and was completed by the end of 1888. For this achievement, Vileišis was awarded the Order of Saint Stanislaus (3rd class). In May 1889, he moved to work on the Ufa–Zlatoust line. At the time, his annual salary was 3,360 Russian rubles, which was a huge sum. He described the results of his experiments on the use of cement mortars and the processing of iron in Polish in two articles published in Przegląd Techniczny in 1889.

Vileišis received an offer to work for the Moscow–Ryazan Railway Association at an annual salary of 6,000 rubles and left his government job at the Ministry of Railways in July 1891. He directed the construction of the Ryazan–Kazan section and built bridges across the Pronya, Moksha, Oka, Sura, Kazanka. After the completion of this line in 1893, Vileišis again was employed by the Ministry of Railways but not as a full-time employee but a contractor from early 1894 to April 1896. He left the ministry as a court councillor. He then worked as contractor for various private railways and information about his activities is fragmentary. He worked on bridges for the Riga–Pskov line as well as numerous bridges, including across the Narew near Warsaw, Donets near Luhansk and Lysychansk, Daugava in Vitebsk and near Jēkabpils, Dnieper near Zhlobin, Lielupe in Jelgava. According to Jonas Basanavičius, Vileišis also worked on the Green Bridge in Vilnius (completed in 1894) but there is no documentary evidence to support the claim.

While profitable, his railroad career led to a nomadic lifestyle as he had to frequently relocate to be closer to the construction sites. He returned to Lithuania in 1899 and settled in Vilnius. Vileišis then worked less on railroad matters as most of the work was handled by his brother Anupras. The brothers worked on the reconstruction of a bridge across the Volkov in Veliky Novgorod in 1901 and construction of a 87-kilometre (54 mi) section of the Siedlce–Polotsk Railway in 1902–1906.

=== Attempts at legal publications ===
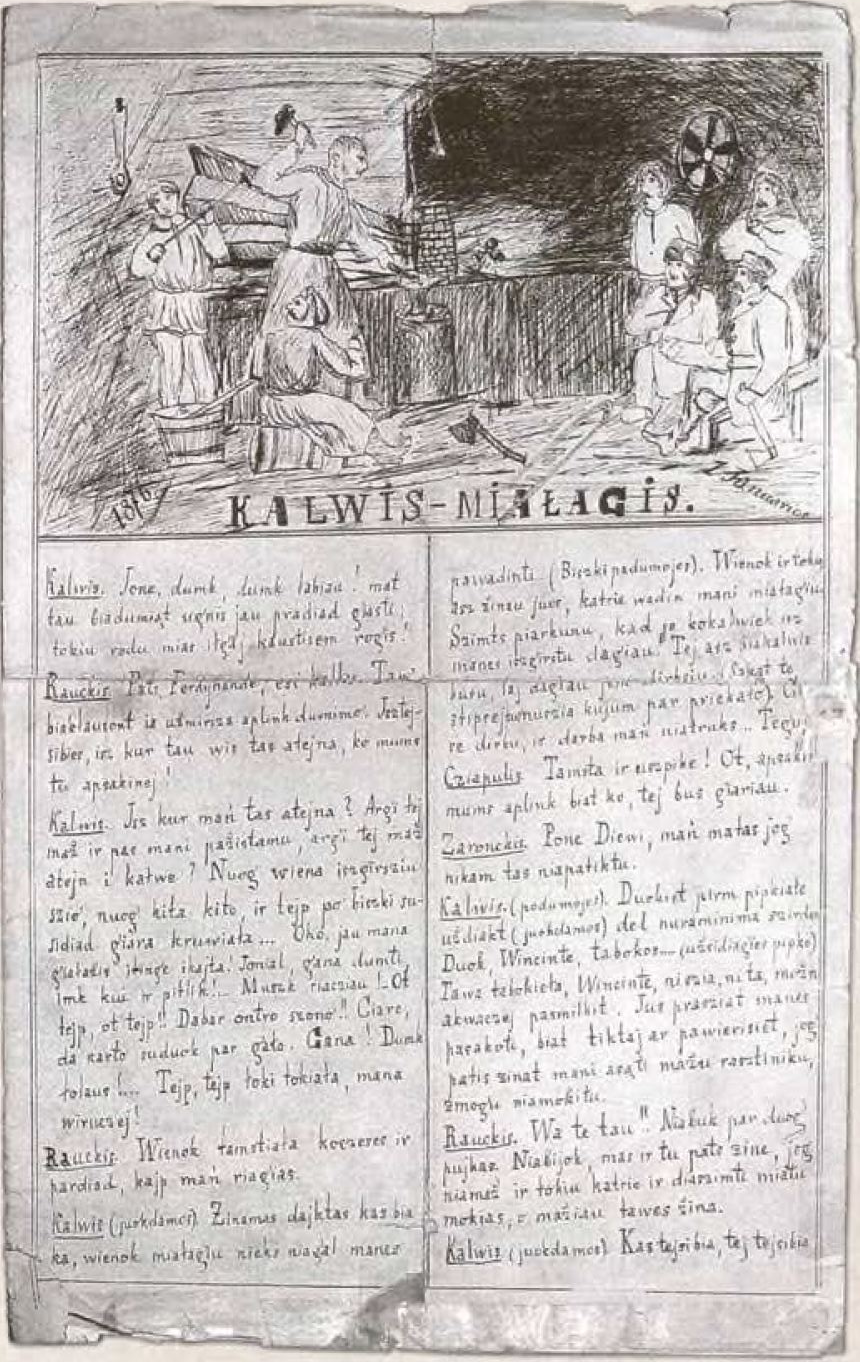
Page of Kalvis melagis

While a student in Saint Petersburg, Vileišis was a member of an informal group of Lithuanian students that used to gather in the apartments of graf Vladimir Zubov. Vileišis and the group established the Lithuanian-language newsletter Kalvis melagis (Smith the Liar) in violation of the Lithuanian press ban. It was a primitive 4-page publication – handwritten and then mimeographed in secret. While only about ten issues appeared between December 1875 and March 1876, it was the first known Lithuanian periodical published in the Russian Empire.

Encouraged by the experience with Kalvis melagis, Vileišis started writing and publishing separate booklets. In 1875, Vileišis wrote a 47-page popular science work on earth and weather which was approved by the state censor and 2,000 copies were published next year. Before the censors discovered their error, Vileišis hurried to complete two other booklets based his writings in Kalvis melagis. They were approved in May and September 1876. In 1877, he published another booklet about the life of George Stephenson, pioneer of rail transport, and Industrial Revolution in England. He prepared many other educational and didactic booklets, including a prayer book, for the common village folk but the state censors rejected all of them due to the Lithuanian press ban. Vileišis was persistent and kept petitioning state censors and other Tsarist officials. His arguments ranged from narrow technicalities (that the Lithuanian alphabet was different from the prohibited Latin–Polish alphabet) to broad policy reasons that the Lithuanian press ban was harmful and should be lifted. He also planned to send a Lithuanian delegation to the new Tsar Alexander III. In March 1883, Vileišis received one final rejection of his petitions to publish Lithuanian texts in Russia.

When his job took him to Moscow, Vileišis met several Lithuanian students, including Jonas Basanavičius, Jonas Šliūpas, Jonas Jablonskis, Vincas Pietaris. In 1880, together with Šliūpas, he prepared a project for the Lithuanian Philological Society (a learned society similar to the Lithuanian Literary Society in the German Empire) and enlisted support from several linguists and university professors, including Vsevolod Miller, Fyodor Korsh, Vatroslav Jagić, Filipp Fortunatov, Yakov Grot. However, the Tsarist officials did not approve the society. In 1892, Lithuanians succeeded in establishing the Lithuanian and Samogitian Charitable Society in Saint Petersburg to provide assistance to Lithuanian students and organize Lithuanian cultural evenings. Vileišis was an active member and briefly became its chairman in 1894–1895.

=== Illegal Lithuanian publications ===
After failing to persuade the Tsarist officials to allow Lithuanian publications, Vileišis turned to printing various educational texts abroad. According to studies of Vaclovas Biržiška, in total Vileišis published 59 books: four in Saint Petersburg, five in United States, and 50 in East Prussia. Vileišis in his memoir later wrote that he authored about 25 books himself, and others were commissions financed by him. It is difficult to determine the accurate number because these booklets were published under various pen names to confuse the Tsarist police. Many of these texts were published by Martynas Jankus in Bitėnai or by Otto von Mauderode in Tilsit and then smuggled into Lithuania. Most booklets had 2,000 copies published, and many saw additional editions. Vileišis made no money from the publications – he paid for the printing costs and then often gifted the printed books to the publishers for free. For commissioned works (mainly translations), Vileišis paid substantial commissions thus in a way subsidizing many poor Lithuanian students studying in Russia. In addition, Vileišis supported Lithuanian periodicals, including Aušra, Varpas, Garsas, Nemuno sargas, both financially and by contributing articles for publication.

Vileišis persisted in his efforts to find legal ways to bypass or abolish the Lithuanian press ban. He petitioned the Supreme Press Board in 1889 and 1896. Refused, he changed the tactics and petitioned the government ministers. He petitioned Ivan Goremykin, Minister of Internal Affairs, in 1897 and Sergei Witte, Minister of Finance, in 1900. Witte was receptive to Vileišis petition and inquired with Tsar Nicholas II but was refused. Vileišis petitioned the Ministry of Internal Affairs again in December 1901. This time, he learned that the issue of the Lithuanian press ban was discussed and was waiting to be referred to the Council of Ministers. Vileišis then hurried to petition Witte again. Vileišis also influenced Pyotr Sviatopolk-Mirsky, the new Governor-General of Vilnius, who wrote to Vyacheslav von Plehve, Minister of the Interior, arguing that the press ban should be lifted. Sviatopolk-Mirsky then further published an anti-ban memorandum, using information provided by Vileišis, and distributed it to various Tsarist institutions. Vileišis petitioned von Plehve two more times until the press ban was finally lifted in May 1904. Several Lithuanian authors, including Vileišis' brother Juozas, claimed that to get the press ban lifted, he bribed Russian officials and spent more than 30,000 Russian rubles. Therefore, the press freedom was not as much "won" as "bought". Vileišis denied these allegations.

=== Life in Vilnius ===
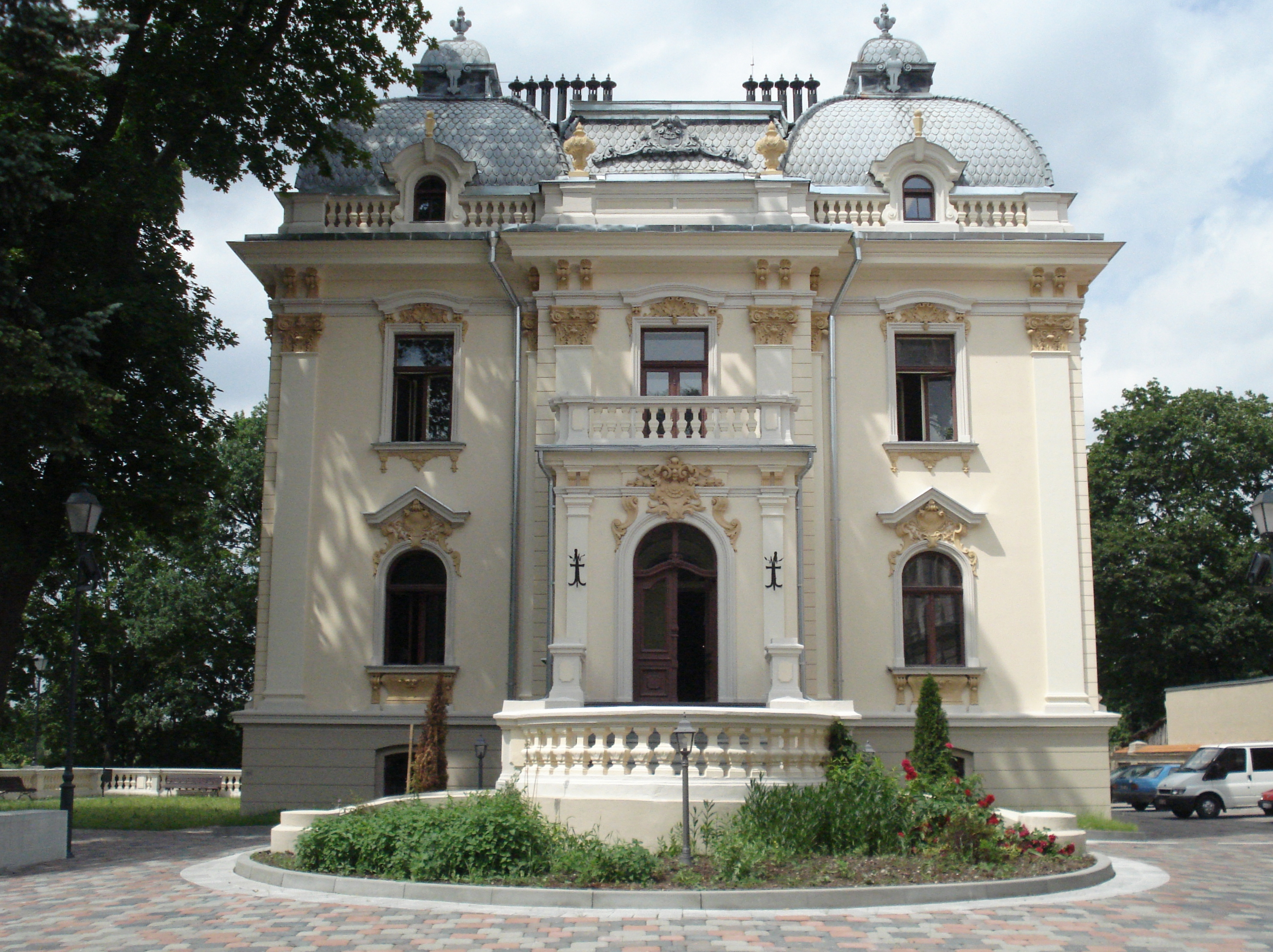
Vileišis Palace in Antakalnis

In 1899, Vileišis semi-retired from the railroad construction and moved to Vilnius. His savings were at least 830,000 Russian rubles. His wealth made him a prominent citizen of Vilnius and was elected to the city duma in 1901–1905. He was friends with many nobles and government officials, including the Governor-General of Vilnius. He used his wealth to finance Lithuanian activities and to build his palatial home, known as the Vileišis Palace, in Antakalnis suburb. The palace was designed by August Klein in Neo-Baroque style and, according to Juozas Tumas-Vaižgantas, cost some 250,000 Russian rubles. Vileišis also established an ironwork factory near the Vilnius Railway Station (present-day Paneriai Street). It produced various industrial items (cisterns, caissons, parts for iron bridges, railroad switches, etc.) and smaller consumer products (fences, memorial crosses, lanterns, etc.). Majority of its business came from Russian government contracts. Larger projects included parts for a bridge across the Snov on the Libau–Romny Railway, bridges along the road Vitebsk–Orsha and railroad Grodno–Masty. Its larger projects in Vilnius included the metal framework for the Halė Market, parts for the Žvėrynas Bridge, and decorative elements for the Vileišis Palace. The factory employed some 120–150 workers who were almost exclusively Lithuanian even though many of them had no technical education or experience. It was a way to increase the number of Lithuanians in the city. Reportedly, the factory was not profitable and was reorganized into Vilija in 1911.

In Vilnius, Vileišis joined the Lithuanian cultural life and became a member of the illegal and mostly informal club known as the Twelve Apostles of Vilnius. One of the key tasks of the society was to organize Lithuanian language masses because at the time, there was not a single church in Vilnius that held masses in Lithuanian. Lithuanians petitioned bishop Stefan Aleksander Zwierowicz and managed to obtain Church of Saint Nicholas for their purposes in December 1901. Vileišis sponsored repairs to the church which was unused for several decades. Reportedly, Vileišis organized a secret storage of illegal Lithuanian publications in the church's attic. During the Russian Revolution of 1905, he was a vocal advocate for education reforms and co-signed petitions on introducing Lithuanian language, literature, history to school curriculums and on reestablishing Vilnius University. He continued to participate in the fight for the Lithuanian language in Catholic churches and, among others, was a signatory of a memorandum sent to Pope Pius X in February 1906.

=== Press ban lifted ===
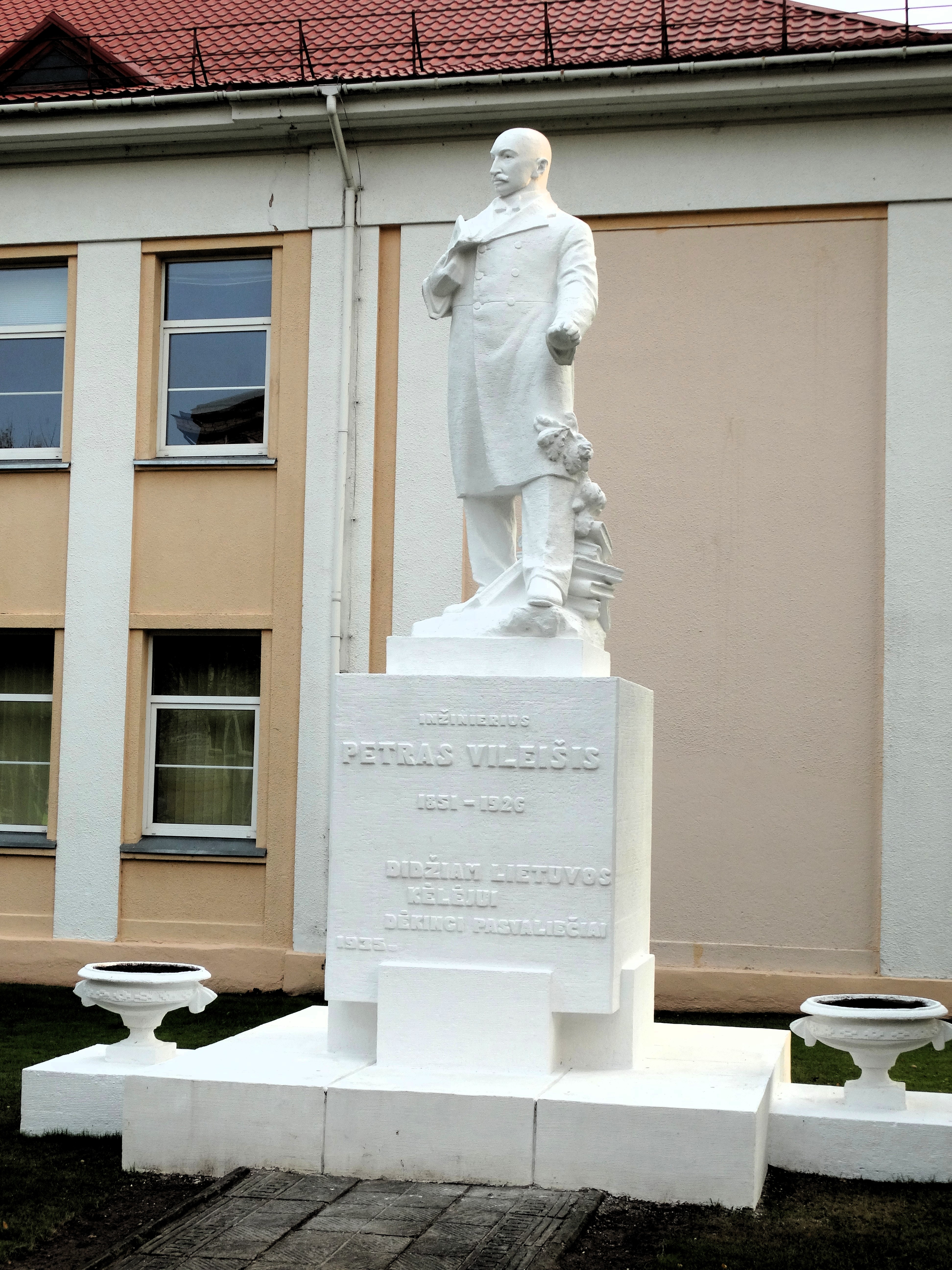
Sculpture of Vileišis in Pasvalys shows him holding an issue of Vilniaus žinios and standing next to a stack of books

As soon as the press ban was lifted in 1904, Vileišis applied for permits to open a Lithuanian printing press and a bookstore. The permits were received in September 1904. The printing press published the first Lithuanian daily Vilniaus žinios. Establishing a daily was a particularly ambitious project as Lithuanians lacked suitable experience. Vileišis hired the best and most experienced publishers at the time – linguist Jonas Jablonskis, editors of Varpas Povilas Višinskis and Jonas Kriaučiūnas, playwright and theater activist Gabrielius Landsbergis-Žemkalnis. The first issue of Vilniaus žinios was published on 10 December 1904. It became popular (helped by the need for news during the Russo-Japanese War) and had almost 6,000 subscribers by early 1905. However, soon the number of subscribers dropped to about 3,000.

Vileišis considered the newspaper his personal project and interfered with the editorial staff leading to conflicts and resignations. For example, Jablonskis and Višinskis resigned within a month. Due to Vileišis conservative political stance, the newspaper did not cover the Russian Revolution of 1905 and did not develop a more distinctive editorial voice. Nevertheless, much of the organizational work for the Great Seimas of Vilnius was carried out by Vileišis and the staff of Vilniaus žinios. Vileišis hoped to increase the readership by catering to the Catholic clergy and invited Juozas Tumas-Vaižgantas to become its new editor. The measure worked temporarily but the newspaper was deeply unprofitable and required constant new funds from Vileišis. The publication was temporarily discontinued in April–June 1907. In August 1907, Vileišis sold the newspaper to a company owned by his brother Jonas Vileišis and others who published it until March 1909.

In addition to Vilniaus žinios, the printing press of Vileišis also published newspapers Šviesa and Lietuvos bitininkas. In 1904–1910, the printing press published a total 128 non-periodical publications. In December 1910, Vileišis sold the press to Witold Kopeć. The bookstore was opened on 25 October 1904 in the building of the present-day Lithuanian National Philharmonic Society. For the initial inventory, he took about 40,000 copies of 42 different booklets that he had published in East Prussia. The bookstore was not profitable and was purchased by its manager Marija Šlapelienė in 1909.

In December 1905, right after the Great Seimas of Vilnius, Vileišis co-founded the National Democrats Party (Tautiškoji demokratų partija), however the party did not become more active. In 1907, Vileišis was elected to the board of the newly established Lithuanian Scientific Society and hosted the first exhibition of Lithuanian art at his home in Antakalnis. He supported many other Lithuanian activities, including the first Lithuanian school in Vilnius, Rūta Society, Kanklės of Vilnius Society. The newspaper and other Lithuanian activities encouraged several Lithuanian activists, including Jonas Basanavičius, Antanas Smetona, Mykolas Biržiška, Gabrielė Petkevičaitė-Bitė, Jurgis Šaulys, Liudas Gira, to relocate to Vilnius. As a result, Vilnius was rapidly becoming the center of Lithuanian cultural life.

=== Return to bridge construction ===
None of Vileišis activities in Vilnius (ironwork factory, daily newspaper, printing press, bookstore) were profitable and by 1908 he had exhausted his savings and incurred debts. He sold these enterprises and returned to Russia to work on railway bridges for another decade. This period of his life is very poorly documented. In 1908–1910, he worked on the Volga–Bugulma Railway. For some time, Steponas Kairys worked as his assistant. Surviving Vileišis' notes show that he struggled financially; in October 1912, he noted that he only had 87 kopeks and had to eat stale bread.

During World War I, his home in Vilnius served as a shelter for Lithuanian refugees. In 1915–1919, he worked on the Tuapse–Senaki section of the Transcaucasus Railway. For this work, he was owed 685,000 Russian rubles. Due to the Russian Revolution, Vileišis did not receive the payment and later attempted to enlist the help of the Lithuanian government in collecting the amounts due. Vileišis calculated that he was owed a total of 1,447,413 gold rubles for his services. Despite difficulties and long distance, Vileišis continued to support Lithuanian activities. He hoped and made plans to one day reestablish Vilniaus žinios. He was also involved in organizing a conference of Lithuanians in Tbilisi in December 1917, supporting the Lithuanian diplomatic mission in Tbilisis (representative Pranas Dailidė), and helping Lithuanian refugees return from Caucasus to Lithuania.

=== Independent Lithuania ===
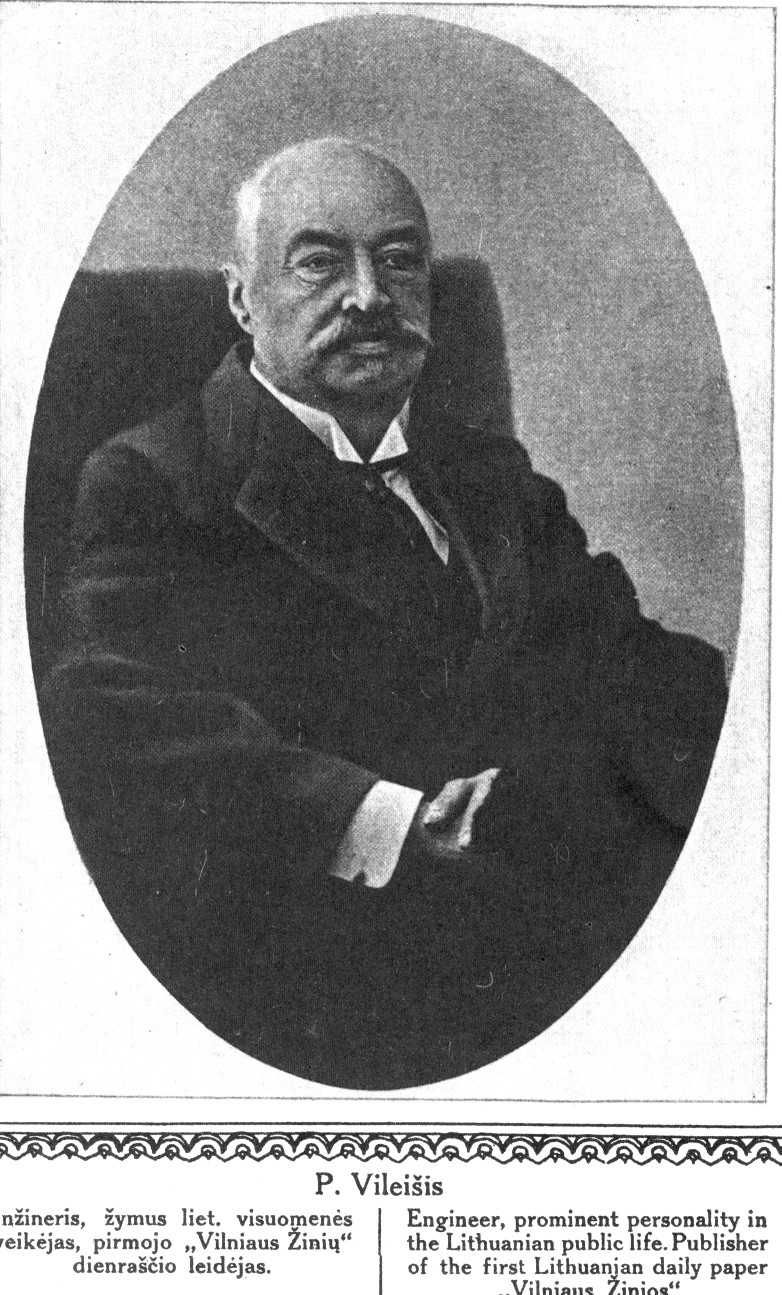
Photo of Vileišis published in an album in 1921

At age 70, Vileišis returned to independent Lithuania in February 1921. At the time, Vilnius (and his palatial home) was part of the Second Polish Republic and he moved to a cheap hotel in Kaunas, the temporary capital of Lithuania. He immediately petitioned the Lithuanian government with a proposal to build a railway connecting Šiauliai–Telšiai–Kretinga–Palanga. The government did not respond to the petition though the proposed railway was later built in 1924–1926 and 1929–1934. However, the government did grant him a special monthly state pension of 450 Lithuanian litas in May 1923.

Soon after his return to Lithuania, Vileišis started writing and publishing articles criticizing Żeligowski's Mutiny and attempts by the League of Nations to mediate the dispute over Vilnius Region. He first published articles in Lietuvos balsas, then had them translated to French and published in Paris using his personal funds in September 1921. In January 1922, he obtained a permit to reestablish Vilniaus žinios but it was published due to his poor health and financial difficulties. Nevertheless, he continued to publish articles about Lithuanian political life, including a criticism of the proposed Lithuanian Land Reform of 1922, an analysis of the Provisional Constitution, and a defense of Antanas Smetona and Augustinas Voldemaras who faced fines and jail time for their criticism of the government. Vileišis translated International Law of Civilised Nations by Friedrich Martens and hoped to publish it with the help of the University of Lithuania. However, he was refused as the book was already too outdated for the students.

On 2 February 1922, Vileišis became Minister of Transport in the government of Prime Minister Ernestas Galvanauskas. However, he resigned in June 1922. ELTA, the official news agency in Lithuania, announced that the resignation was for health reasons. This was contradicted by Vileišis who published a short note in Tėvynės balsas that his resignation was requested by the Prime Minister. This caused ELTA to publish a more detailed account which claimed that Vileišis was pushed out of the government due to a diplomatic blunder – Vileišis hosted an afternoon tea which was attended by the first secretary of the Polish legation in Berlin. Such encounters with Polish politicians and diplomats were to be avoided at all cost in the light of the ongoing Polish–Lithuanian dispute over Vilnius. Vileišis responded that the afternoon tea was a private and unofficial event and that the Polish diplomat showed up uninvited. He claimed that the conflict with Galvanauskas started when Vileišis dismissed his vice-minister Silvestras Grinkevičius. Such public disagreement caused much speculation as to the real causes of Vileišis dismissal. Many commentators concluded that Vileišis was too patriotic and idealist to work with bureaucrats and careerists who looked only after their own self-interest. However, Vileišis returned to the ministry when he was selected as chairman of the Council of Engineers, an advisory institution to the ministry. He served in this capacity from 1 October 1923 to his death. This position paid a respectable salary which helped resolve Vileišis' financial difficulties.

In summer 1923, Vileišis chaired a committee which debated the construction of the War Museum and selected its location though the construction started only in 1930. In February 1923 and May 1926, Vileišis was awarded honorary doctorates in literature and engineering by the University of Lithuania.

== Death ==
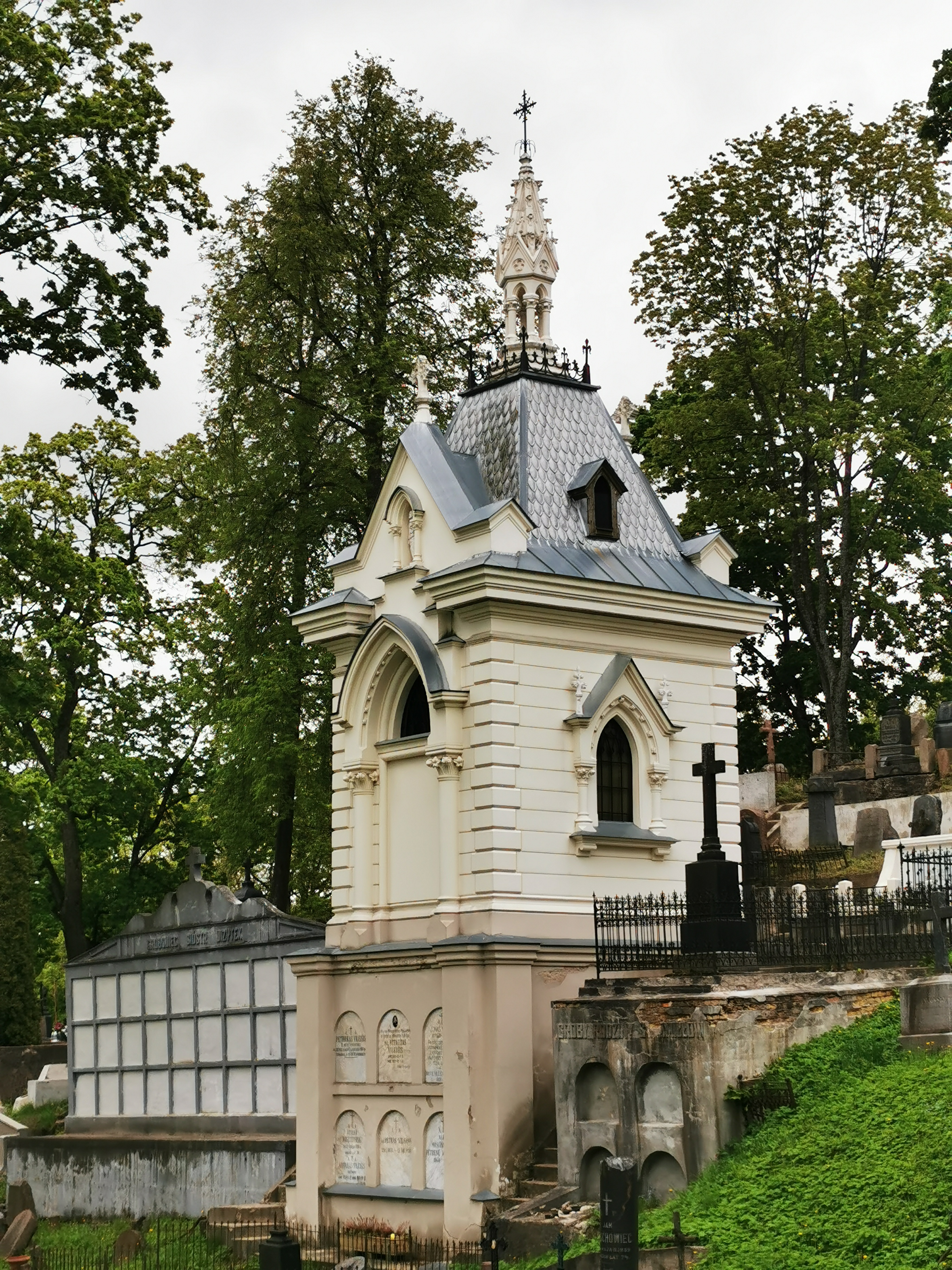
Vileišis family chapel–mausoleum at the Rasos Cemetery

Vileišis died suddenly on 12 August 1926 while on vacation in Palanga. The government organized a state funeral and closed all government institutions for two hours (duration of the funeral) on 16 August. The funeral was attended by President Kazys Grinius, Prime Minister Mykolas Sleževičius, Speaker of the Seimas Jonas Staugaitis, and other dignitaries. The religious rites were performed by Juozas Tumas-Vaižgantas. After a brief stop at the War Museum and a Catholic mass by Archbishop Juozas Skriveckas, Vileišis was temporarily buried in a crypt of Kaunas Cathedral. Many Lithuanian periodicals published Vileišis' obituary or memoirs about him. Lietuvos žinios devoted the entire issue of 17 August to his memory.

In his last will, Vileišis wanted to be buried in the family chapel that he constructed in the Rasos Cemetery in Vilnius after the death of his 12-year-old son Petras in 1904. However, due to the conflict with Poland over Vilnius Region, it could not be accomplished until 22 March 1936. His transport from Kaunas and reburial in Vilnius was a public event.

== Legacy ==
In 1926, a square used for military parades in Žaliakalnis, a neighborhood in Kaunas, was renamed after Vileišis. In 1929, the new Petras Vileišis Bridge across the Neris River in Kaunas was named in his honor. In 1933, Lithuania issued two postage stamps with a portrait of Vileišis (the series commemorated the 50th anniversary of Aušra). In 1934, a new primary school named after Vileišis was opened in Mediniai, his birthplace. The school had a small room dedicated to his memorial museum. In 1935, the Higher Commerce School in Pasvalys (near the birthplace of Vileišis) was named in his honor. At the same time, a 6-metre (20 ft) sculpture of Vileišis (sculptor Vincas Grybas) was unveiled near the school. This sculpture was not destroyed during the Soviet era and survives to this day. In September 1939, a bust of Vileišis by sculptor Bernardas Bučas was unveiled in the garden of the War Museum. This bust was demolished in 1950.

During the Soviet era, Vileišis was rarely mentioned in specialist literature because he was a capitalist. After Lithuania declared independence in 1990, he is once again remembered and honored. Already in 1991, his 140th birth anniversary, the Martynas Mažvydas National Library of Lithuania and the community of Pasvalys organized exhibitions, readings, and memorials. Objects named after Vileišis during the interwar period were again renamed in his honor – the school in Pasvalys in 1989, the square and street in Kaunas in 1989 and 1991, the bridge across Neris in 2008; the bust in the garden of the War Museum was reconstructed in 1989. A school in Kaunas was named in honor of Vileišis (it was renamed in honor of both Vileišis and his brother Jonas in 2009). In 2001, Lithuania issued a postage stamp with a portrait of Vileišis. In 2018, a monument to three Vileišis brothers (Petras, Jonas, and Antanas) by sculptor Regimantas Midvikis was unveiled in Vilnius.

The first longer biography of Vileišis was published by Juozas Tumas-Vaižgantas in 1924. Several monographs about Vileišis were published after 1990: by Jonas Pertronis in 1992, by Antanas Kučys (in United States) and Jonas Aničas in 1993. Selected works and writings of Vileišis were collected and republished by the Institute of Lithuanian Literature and Folklore in 2004.

== Publications ==
=== Positivist outlook ===
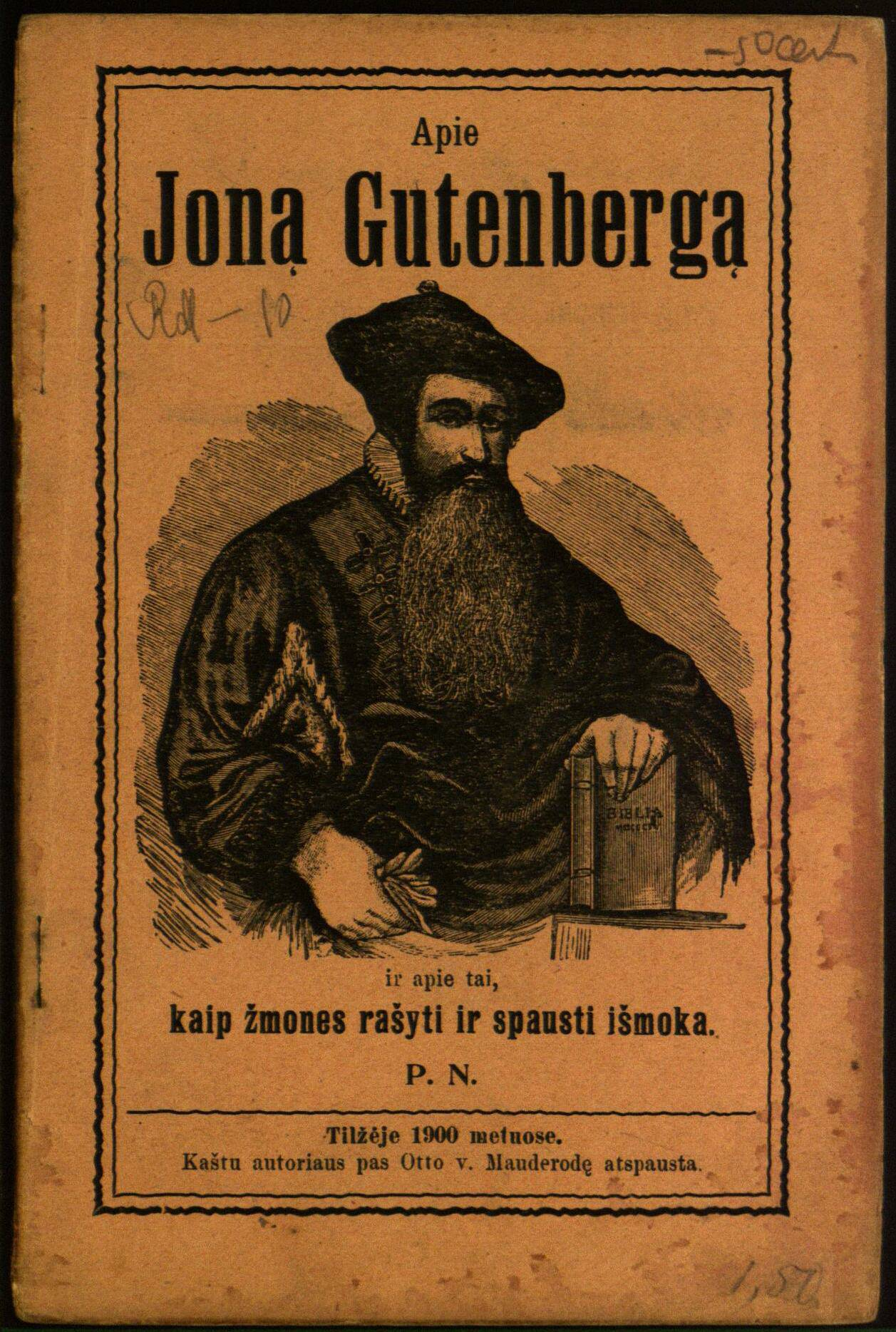
Cover page of a book about Johannes Gutenberg published by Vileišis in 1900

Vileišis was influenced by positivism and attempted to implement it in practice. He focused on improving social and economic conditions of the Lithuanian people and published many educational works on how to improve agricultural practices, encourage trade and industry, credit unions and cooperatives. Many other activists of the time focused on romantic nationalism – glorification of the history of the old Grand Duchy of Lithuania and praise of the beauty of the archaic Lithuanian language – to build the national consciousness and improve self-worth of the Lithuanian people. Vileišis was more practical – he thought the same goals would be achieved through improved economic and living conditions.

Vileišis also disliked politics and stayed away from political demands or proclamations. He frequently spoke out against publishing texts attacking and criticizing the government as this would only antagonize the government and strengthen the repressive Russification policies. Therefore, sometimes he is criticized as a Tsarist loyalist. This outlook is well reflected in Vileišis correspondence about Aušra, the first national Lithuanian newspaper. In 1883, Vileišis wrote letters advising its publishers and criticizing its content. He wanted to publish practical and educational advice and not historical and literary texts (preferred by Jonas Basanavičius) or political debates and pro-socialist articles (introduced by Jonas Šliūpas). Therefore, he initially refused to support Aušra.

=== Publication themes ===
Many of Vileišis' books contained practical and specific agricultural advice and guides. In 1883, his first publication in East Prussia, was agricultural advice written by Ignacy Łyskowski and translated from Polish by Vincas Pietaris. Vileišis also published booklets on cattle (1884), on gardens, hops, and bees (1885), cows and milk (1892), horses and their illnesses (1893), potatoes (1900), oats (1902), etc. In 1902–1903, he published three textbook-type booklets about selected crafts (including lathing, metal working, brush, wheel, and rope making, tanning of leather and furs). He also published basic guides to laws relevant to peasants (two booklets in 1886 and 1887). Vileišis commissioned three further legal booklets from Antanas Smetona in 1902–1903. He further sponsored the publication of 17 medical booklets by his physician brother Antanas.

Vileišis also published a number of booklets explaining the basic concepts of physics, chemistry, cosmology, geology, geography. Several of them were based on writings of Mieczysław Brzeziński. About a quarter of the books in this category explained the workings of machinery (e.g. steam engine, railways, printing press). He published four textbooks on arithmetic, geometry, geography, and physics even though there were no schools teaching in Lithuanian. As these were the first technical books in Lithuanian, Vileišis had to translate and create Lithuanian equivalents to many technical terms a few of which are still used in modern Lithuanian.

Vileišis published several books about or by famous businessmen, including the pioneer of rail transport George Stephenson, American showman P. T. Barnum, banker and archaeologist John Lubbock, 1st Baron Avebury. He translated and published abbreviated Self-Help by Samuel Smiles in 1903. He promoted industry, trade, and crafts. In 1901, he published a booklet promoting cooperatives. These economic areas were dominated by the Lithuanian Jews, therefore Vileišis often wrote about them as competitors of Lithuanians and published a separate booklet in 1886. While Vileišis promoted wealth accumulation, he emphasized ethics – good moral character, strong will and determination, hard work and frugality. He also promoted self-learning.

Despite his focus on practical and educational texts, Vileišis also published several texts about the history of Lithuania. He translated the history of Lithuania by Konstancja Skirmuntt and had it published by Jonas Šliūpas in the United States in 1887. He published two booklets condemning the Polonization of Lithuania. One of them was first published by Jonas Basanavičius in the Russian newspaper Novoye Vremya in 1883. In 1892–1893, he published two booklets about the history of Vilnius and the closed Vilnius University. In 1895, he published a booklet about the relations of the Russian Empire with the western Europe and the Catholic Church. In it, he criticized various Russification policies. Vileišis also planned to write a short world history, but managed to complete only the first volume about the ancient history in 1903. When he opened his own press in Vilnius, he published about 30 postcards (most of them with lithographs of historical sites by Napoleon Orda).

== Family ==
In April 1885, Vileišis married Alina Zinaida Moszczyńska, a Roman Catholic daughter of petty nobles. She was born near Orsha. His brother Anupras married Alina's sister Leocadia. Very little is known about Alina's life. According to Juozas Tumas-Vaižgantas, she supported Polish culture and only tolerated her husband's Lithuanian activities. Another memoir published by Pranas Stanaitis in 1929 claimed that Vileišis spoke French to his wife at home, but used Lithuanian to speak to their children. Vileišis did not write about his wife except for a brief mention that she helped with bookkeeping at his printing press and bookstore in Vilnius.

The couple had six children: Jonas (1886–1946) who became an attorney, Vytautas (1887–1937) who was Minister of Transport in 1929–1934, Elena Vileišytė-Jaloveckienė (1889–1953), Marija Vileišytė-Baženskienė (1891–1944) who published two collections of Polish poetry in 1920s, Petras (1892–1904) who died suddenly of brain inflammation, and Kazimiera Birutė Vileišytė-Stulginskienė (1894–1971).

== Bibliography ==
- Aničas, Jonas (1993). Petras Vileišis, 1851–1926: gyvenimo ir veiklos bruožai (in Lithuanian). Vilnius: Alna litera. ISBN 9986-02-004-2.
- Aničas, Jonas (2001). Petras Vileišis 1851–1926 (in Lithuanian). Vilnius: Alma littera. ISBN 9986-02-958-9.
- Baltic News Service (8 February 2018). "Vilniuje atidengtas paminklas broliams Vileišiams" (in Lithuanian). 15min.lt.
- Bitautas, Algis (2016). "Vileišis Petras" (PDF). In Tamošaitis, Mindaugas; Bitautas, Algis; Svarauskas, Artūras (eds.). Lietuvos Respublikos 1918–1940 m. vyriausybių ministrų biografinis žodynas (in Lithuanian). Vilnius: Mokslo ir enciklopedijų leidybos centras. pp. 480–484. ISBN 978-5-420-01778-4.
- Grigaravičius, Algirdas (16 February 2016). "Apie verslininką Joną Basanavičių" (in Lithuanian). Verslo žinios.
- Juodytė, Genė (29 March 2013). "Landsbergiai ir Pakruojo kraštas" (in Lithuanian). Šiaulių kraštas. Archived from the original on 2020-06-30.
- Kauno apskrities viešoji biblioteka (2004). "Vileišis Petras". Žymūs Kauno žmonės: atminimo įamžinimas (in Lithuanian).
- Petronis, Jonas (1992). Petras Vileišis (in Lithuanian). Vaga. OCLC 1087553596.
- Tamošiūnas, Julius (1991). Lietuviškų periodinių leidinių bibliografija 1832–1982 (in Lithuanian). Kaunas: Julius Tamošiūnas. OCLC 35388671.
