= Lithuanian Scientific Society =

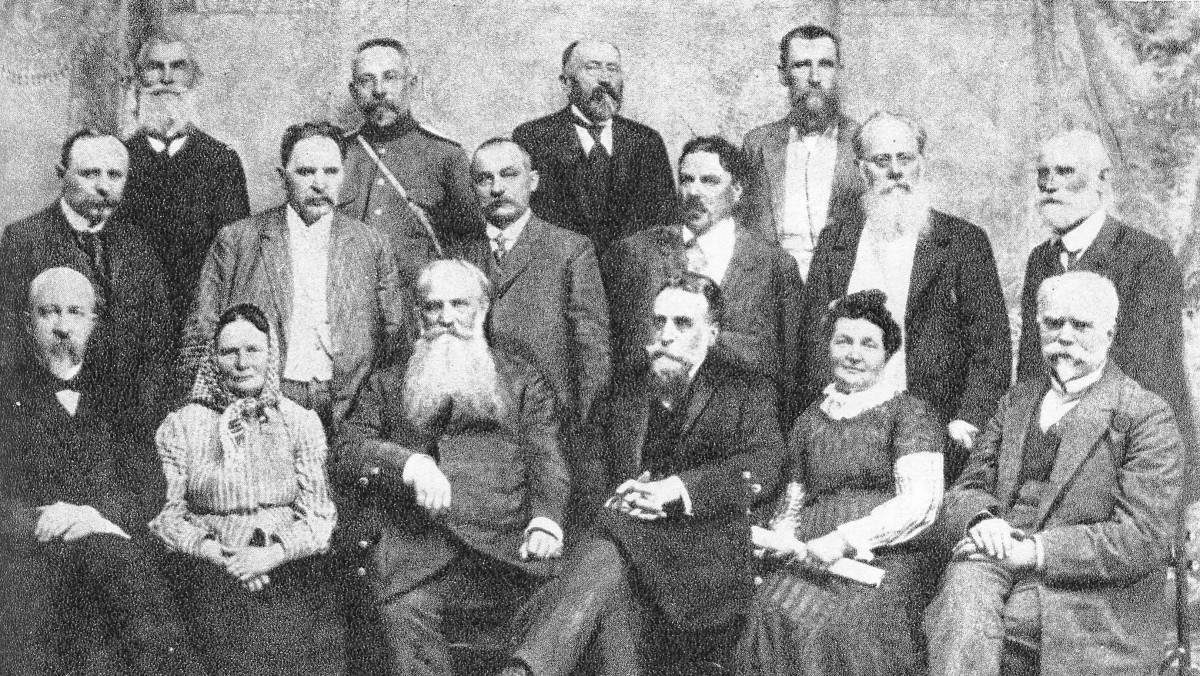
Members of the Lithuanian Science Society in 1912. Left to right, first row: Jonas Jablonskis, Žemaitė, Petras Kriaučiūnas, Jonas Basanavičius, Liudvika Didžiulienė, Jonas Dielininkaitis; second row: Vincas Palukaitis, Antanas Vileišis, Baltramiejus Čepulis, Adomas Sketeris, Gabrielius Landsbergis-Žemkalnis, Jonas Ambrozaitis; third row: Juozas Kairiūkštis, Jonas Spudulis, Mečislovas Silvestraitis, Mikalojus Kuprevičius.

The Lithuanian Scientific Society (Lithuanian: Lietuvių mokslo draugija) was a scientific, cultural, and educational organization that was active between 1907 and 1940 in Vilnius, Lithuania. It was founded in 1907 on the initiative of Jonas Basanavičius.

The founding assembly of the organization took place on April 7, 1907. The assembly elected Jonas Basanavičius as chairman, Stasys Matulaitis and Povilas Matulionis as vice-chairmen, Jonas Vileišis as secretary, Antanas Vileišis as treasurer, and Antanas Smetona as librarian. Other members of the organization included Juozas Tumas-Vaižgantas, Juozas Bagdonas, and Petras Vileišis. Jonas Basanavičius served as its chairman until his death in 1927.

The Society conducted research on the Lithuanian language and its dialects, along with anthropological, archaeological, and other historical research. It operated a library, an archive, a reading room, and a museum, and was involved in the publication of Lithuanian textbooks. The Society also published the scholarly journal Lietuvių Tauta (The Lithuanian Nation). In 1911 the Vilnius city magistrate began a proceeding to demolish the city's Upper Castle, and use the hill as a water supply reservoir. The Lithuanian Scientific Society, under the direction of Jonas Basanavičius, initiated a protest and was successful in preventing the planned demolition. The remains of the Castle were spared. The Society also worked to preserve the Lida and Trakai Castles.

The Society was based in the Vileišis Palace. In January 1938 the Society was banned by the Polish government, when Vilnius was part of Poland. The Society resumed its activities in January 1939 under its new name, The Lithuanian Society of Friends of Science (Lietuvių mokslo mylėtoju draugija). After Lithuania was ceded the city in late 1939 by the Soviet Union as a result of the Molotov–Ribbentrop Pact, the property of the Society was transferred to the Institute of the Lithuanian Language in 1940, and later to the Lithuanian Academy of Sciences. Most of the exhibits were later transferred to the Lithuanian Museum of History and Ethnography; the numismatic collection went to the Lithuanian Art Museum.

== Honorary members ==
- Adalbert Bezzenberger
- Baudouin de Courtenay
- Filipp Fortunatov
- Aleksey Shakhmatov
- Tadeusz Wróblewski

== See also ==
- Lithuanian Academy of Sciences
