= Ožkabaliai =

- Village
- Location of Ožkabaliai
- Coordinates: 54°29′49″N 22°59′35″E
- Country: Lithuania
- County: Marijampolė County
- Municipality: Vilkaviškis district municipality
- Elderate: Bartninkai elderate

Population (2011)
  - Total: 44
- Time zone: UTC+2 (EET)
  - Summer (DST): UTC+3 (EEST)

Ožkabaliai is a village in Vilkaviškis district municipality, Lithuania. According to the 2011 census, it had 44 residents.

It is best known as the birthplace of Jonas Basanavičius (1851–1927), one of the most prominent activists of the Lithuanian National Revival.

Their reconstructed home is now a branch of the National Museum of Lithuania. The former pantry room holds the permanent exhibition of the works of his brother, Vincas Basanavičius.
