= Kalvis melagis =

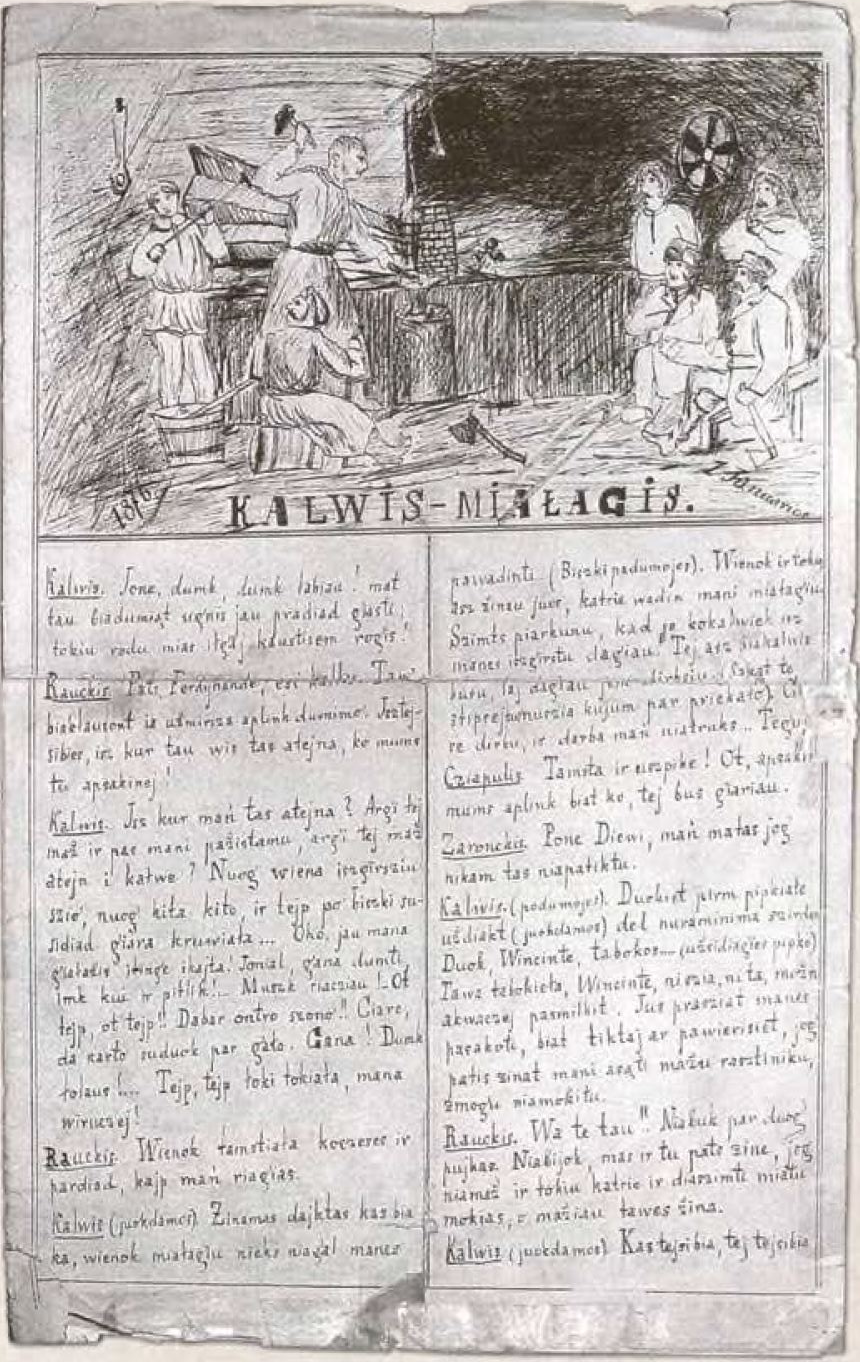
First page of 1 January 1876 issue

Kalvis melagis (original spelling Kalwis-Miałagis; transl. Blacksmith the Liar) was a Lithuanian-language periodical published by Petras Vileišis and other Lithuanian students in Saint Petersburg, Russian Empire, in 1875–1876. Lithuanian publications were banned after the Uprising of 1863. As a result, Kalvis melagis was published in secret and was short-lived (less than 10 issues appeared). It was a primitive hand-written and then mimeographed 4-page newsletter. Nevertheless, it is the first known Lithuanian periodical in the Russian Empire and one of the first Lithuanian periodicals overall.

== History ==
A handful of Lithuanians who studied at various universities in Saint Petersburg gathered into an informal group. According to Juozas Tumas-Vaižgantas, the group would gather in the apartment of count Vladimir Zubov. Its most active member was Petras Vileišis who initiated the publication of Kalvis megalis. The nameplate was drawn by Stanislovas Lukša. Other contributors included Juozas Brazaitis, Juozas Grigiškis, Česlovas Pancežinskis, Jonas Kymantas. It was handwritten by Vileišis on standard 22 cm × 35 cm (8.7 in × 13.8 in) paper, mimeographed, and distributed among Lithuanian students and sent via mail to others. It was published three times a month between December 1875 and March 1876 but no more than 10 issues appeared. Though circulation must have been very small, Kalvis melagis was known to Lithuanian activists. Jonas Šliūpas wrote about it in Aušra in 1883.

He picked the title based on blacksmith Krasnickis near his native village. As a child, Vileišis liked to visit the smithy and listen to blacksmith's stories. Since the smithy was visited by many people from different places, the blacksmith heard and told news and rumors but would always say that he was a liar and made up stories to avoid any trouble with the police. The circumstances around the establishment of Kalvis melagis were described in the novel Tėviškė (Homeland) by Ona Pleirytė-Puidienė.

== Content ==
Two surviving issues of Kalvis melagis (1 and 10 January 1876) were discovered in 1941. They are kept in the collection of Polish ethnographer Jan Aleksander Karłowicz at the Lithuanian State Historical Archives. These two surviving issues published parts of Vileišis' short story Jonas ir Aniutė and an untitled dialogue of blacksmith with local peasants as well as basic introduction to arithmetic with exercises, a Lithuanian folk song, short news from Lithuania and announcements. Its educational content targeted less educated villagers. It was written phonetically in the native dialect of Vileišis using the Polish alphabet and many Slavic loanwords.

According to memoirs of Juozas Brazaitis, who was a medical student at the time, Kalvis melagis also published his translation of the song about Wilija (Neris) from the poem Konrad Wallenrod by Adam Mickiewicz as well as his original poem Išvažiavimas iš namų studento (Departure of a Student from Home). According to Brazaitis, Kalvis melagis also published translated excerpts from the poem Pan Tadeusz by Mickiewicz, some political texts, and even prices of grain.

=== Jonas ir Aniutė and dialogues of the blacksmith ===
Encouraged by his experience with Kalvis melagis, Vileišis prepared his two main contributions – short story Jonas ir Aniutė and dialogues of the blacksmith – for publication as separate booklets. Lithuanian publications were banned but due to an error by the state censor, the two booklets were approved in May and September 1876. The official permit for Jonas ir Aniutė was issued not to Vileišis but to Vladislovas Stulginskis and therefore his initials WS appear on the cover. It was one of a few times when Lithuanians managed to circumvent the press ban and publish Lithuanian texts.

Jonas ir Aniutė was published as a 36-page booklet. It is a story about a beautiful and industrious young woman Aniutė. She is an orphan and hired help with no dowry, but falls in love with Jonas, a son of a wealthy peasant who worked hard, saved money, and bought himself out of serfdom. Jonas' father protests the relationship and wants to banish the lovers. Jonas though illiterate promises to work hard and earn a living for both of them (by, among other things, trading grain he cultivates in present-day Latvia). Jonas' father eventually relents and the story ends happily with the wedding. The story describes folk customs (e.g. preparations for Christmas, games, songs) as well as praises nature (in particular, rivers Mūša and Lėvuo). It paints an idyllic image of a Lithuanian village which did not reflect social realities and is quite atypical in Lithuanian literature.

The blacksmith dialogues were published as a 40-page booklet titled Dvi labai naudingos šnekos (Two Very Useful Talks). The text was heavily edited from the version that was published in Kalvis melagis (e.g. shortened monologues, reduced number of characters, streamlined the story, changed some names and locations, improved the language). The work features blacksmith Ferdinandas, an old wise man and village philosopher, talking with village folk who stopped by the smithy. The first talk includes realistic stories about a Lithuanian student who studied in Saint Petersburg and saved enough to buy a pharmacy in Pasvalys, a local noble who partied and gambled his inherited estate away, several stories of people who borrowed heavily from Jewish lenders and lost almost everything they had. The second talk provides some advice on how to avoid going into debt, i.e. by selling agricultural products in Riga and Jelgava without intermediaries. The booklet ends with an appendix about Russian education system, including requirements to apply, tuition costs, and available financial aid. It is clear that the work was written from Vileišis' personal experiences, many characters were named after his own family members. While clearly a didactic work, it is not a sermon and written in a more acceptable conversational format.

== Bibliography ==
- Aničas, Jonas (2001). Petras Vileišis 1851–1926 (in Lithuanian). Vilnius: Alma littera. ISBN 9986-02-958-9.
- Petronis, Jonas (1992). Petras Vileišis (in Lithuanian). Vaga. OCLC 1087553596.
- Tamošiūnas, Julius (1991). Lietuviškų periodinių leidinių bibliografija 1832–1982 (in Lithuanian). Kaunas: Julius Tamošiūnas. OCLC 35388671.
