= Jonas Basanavičius =

Lithuanian activist (1851–1927)

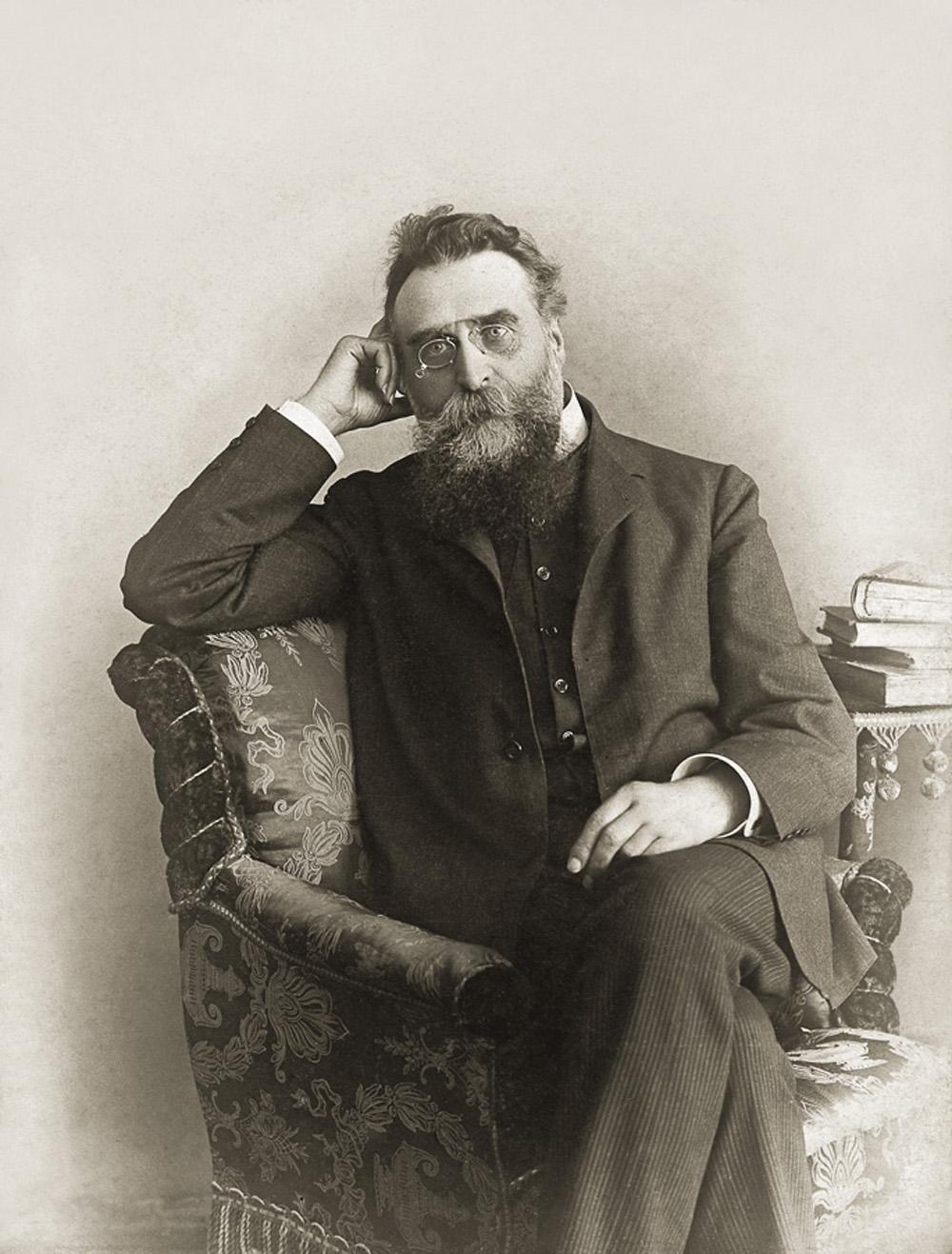
- Basanavičius in 1905
- Born: 23 November 1851; Oszkobole, Congress Poland, Russian Empire (now Ožkabaliai, Lithuania)
- Died: 16 February 1927 (aged 75); Wilno, Poland (now Vilnius, Lithuania)
- Resting place: Rasos Cemetery; 54°40′9″N 25°18′10″E
- Citizenship: Russian Empire; Principality of Bulgaria; Second Polish Republic
- Education: Imperial Moscow University (1879)
- Occupation: Physician
- Known for: Publisher of Aušra, founder of the Lithuanian Scientific Society, signatory of the Act of Independence of Lithuania
- Spouse: Gabriela Eleonora Mohl
- Parents: Juras Basanavičius (1826–1879) (father); Marė Birštoniūtė (1826–1890) (mother)
- Relatives: Brother Vincas Basanavičius

Signature
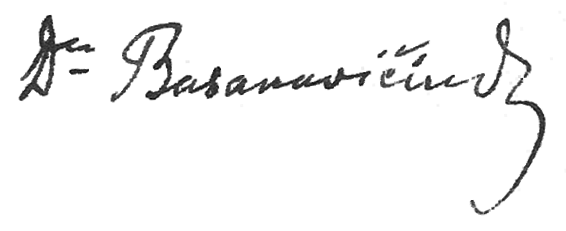

Jonas Basanavičius (Polish: Jan Basanowicz; 23 November 1851 – 16 February 1927) was an activist and proponent of the Lithuanian National Revival. He participated in every major event leading to the independent Lithuanian state and is often given the informal honorific title of the "Patriarch of the Nation" (Lithuanian: tautos patriarchas) for his contributions.

Born to a family of farmers, Basanavičius was to become a priest but instead chose to study medicine at the Moscow Medical Academy. He worked as a doctor from 1880 to 1905 in the Principality of Bulgaria. Despite the long distance, he dedicated substantial effort to the Lithuanian cultural work. He founded the first Lithuanian-language newspaper Aušra (1883), contributed articles on Lithuania to the press, collected samples of Lithuanian folklore (songs, fairy-tales, legends, riddles, etc.) and published them. He was also involved with local Bulgarian politics. He returned to Lithuania in 1905 and immediately joined Lithuanian cultural life. He became chairman of the organizing committee of the 1905 Great Seimas of Vilnius. In 1907, he founded the Lithuanian Scientific Society, a learned society dedicated to Lithuanian history, ethnography, linguistics. Basanavičius became chairman of the society and dedicated the rest of his life to its affairs. In 1917, he was elected by the Vilnius Conference to the Council of Lithuania. He chaired the council's session that adopted the Act of Independence of Lithuania on 16 February 1918 and was the first to sign it. In the aftermath of World War I, Vilnius changed hands and regimes several times, but Basanavičius refused to leave, safeguarding the city's museums, libraries and archives, and continuing his lifelong research of Lithuanian cultural matters. After Żeligowski's Mutiny in October 1920, Vilnius became part of Poland and Lithuanian activities were censored and limited. Basanavičius' continued presence in the city became a symbol of Lithuanian claims to the bitterly contested Vilnius Region. When he died in 1927, the Lithuanian government declared a five-day mourning period.

== Early life and education ==
Basanavičius was born in the village of Ožkabaliai (Polish: Oszkobole) in the Augustów Governorate of Congress Poland, a client state of the Russian Empire, to a family of Lithuanian farmers. His younger brother Vincas was born in 1861; other children died in childhood. Birth complications prompted his parents, devout Catholics, to pray and promise that they would educate their firstborn to be a priest. Keeping up with the promise, the parents supported a village tutor for local children. There Basanavičius learned basic reading, writing, and arithmetic as well as serving the altar. He further attended an elementary school in Lukšiai. During that time Polish was regarded as the more prestigious language of the nobility and well educated people. Russian was used in state administration, while Lithuanian was used among the peasants. After the Uprising of 1863, Tsarist authorities implemented various Russification policies in an attempt to reduce the influence of Polish language and culture. One of such policies allowed Basanavičius to attend Marijampolė Gymnasium. Before the uprising, a son of a Lithuanian could hardly expect to be admitted to a school catering to Polish nobility. Basanavičius failed his first entrance examinations in 1865, but succeeded a year later.

Basanavičius developed appreciation for the Lithuanian language, culture, and history from local hill forts and his parents, who provided a loving treasure of local songs, legends, stories. This appreciation grew and deepened at the gymnasium where Basanavičius got acquainted with classical authors of Lithuanian history (Maciej Stryjkowski, Alexander Guagnini, Jan Długosz, Marcin Kromer), studied Lithuanian folk songs, read classical poems The Seasons by Kristijonas Donelaitis, Konrad Wallenrod by Adam Mickiewicz, Margier by Władysław Syrokomla, and historical fiction by Józef Ignacy Kraszewski. In 1883, he wrote in Aušra:

But who, we ask, composed all these songs about Lithuania's past, which made famous the name of Polish poetry in Europe? The answer is short: Lithuanians! Adomas Mickevičius, L. Kondratavičius, J. I. Kraševskis, T. Lenartavičius, Kotkis (Chodźko), Adinčius (Odyniec), Asnikis and many other lesser bards had Lithuanian surnames, are Lithuanians, come from Lithuania and Lithuanian blood is pulsating through their veins. If they wrote about the past of their loved Lithuania in a non-Lithuanian language, the Polish influence in Lithuanian affairs is to blame.

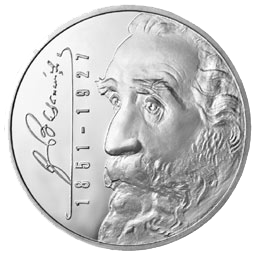
50 litų coin commemorating the 150th anniversary of Basanavičius' birth, 2001.

He drifted away from religion after reading a critical essay of Life of Jesus by Ernest Renan. Upon graduation in 1873, he managed to persuade his parents to allow him to attend Moscow University and not to send him to the Sejny Priest Seminary.

Basanavičius traveled to Moscow first to study history and philology, but after two semesters he transferred to the Moscow Medical Academy. Again, he benefited from the post-uprising Russification policies. He received one of ten fellowships (360 rubles annually) established for Lithuanian students from Congress Poland. He also supplemented his income by taking up private tutoring, but the living conditions were harsh and that had a lasting impact on his health. Basanavičius actively participated in student affairs, followed developments in Lithuania, and continued his studies of Lithuanian heritage. Collecting data from Rumyantsev and university libraries, he hoped to write a study on Grand Duke Kęstutis. He usually spent his summers in Lithuania, collecting folk songs, fairytales, riddles.

== Medical career in Bulgaria ==
After his graduation in spring 1879, Basanavičius traveled back to Lithuania and had a few patients in Ožkabaliai, Vilkaviškis and Aleksotas. He returned to Moscow in October 1879 hoping to establish his private practice, but soon he accepted a lucrative proposal from the Principality of Bulgaria to become the head of a hospital in Lom Palanka, a town of about 8,000 inhabitants. After arrival in late January 1880, he found a run-down hospital located in a former hotel and energetically took measures to construct a new building, establish outpatient service, and combat perception that the hospital was a place to die rather than to get well. In 1880, the hospital had 522 inpatients and 1,144 outpatients compared to just 19 patients during 1879. The position paid well, expenses were low, so he was able to quickly repay debts and accumulate savings. Basanavičius also wrote medical research articles, liberal political articles supporting Bulgarian politician Petko Karavelov, and cultural articles for Prussian Lithuanian press, including Tilžės Keleivis and Lietuwißka Ceitunga, and academic journal Mitteilungen der Litauischen literarischen Gesellschaft. However, these publications were too much under German control and did not satisfy growing needs of Lithuanian activists. Basanavičius contemplated establishing a truly Lithuanian newspaper.

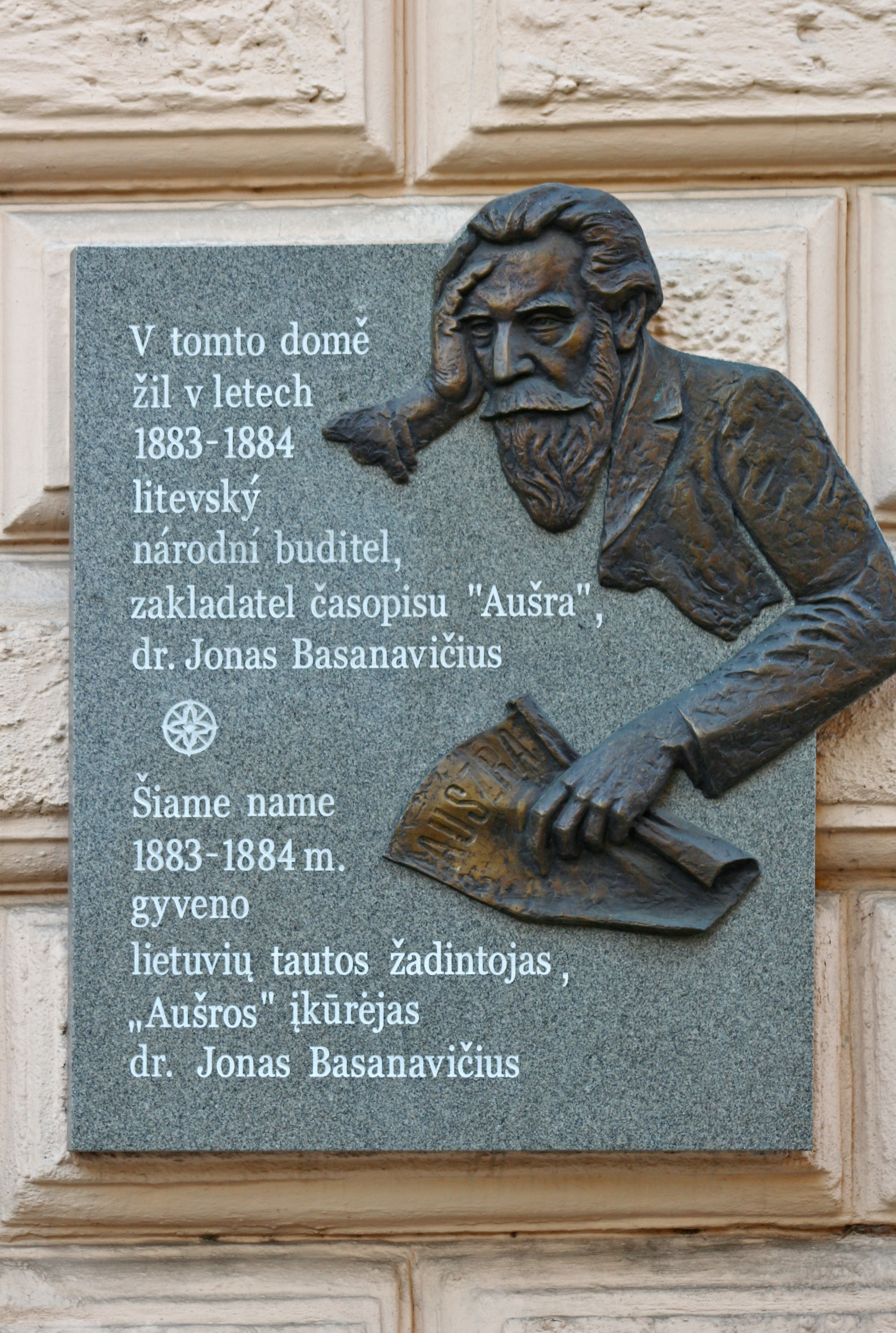
A memorial plaque in Prague on the house where Basanavičius lived

After the assassination of Tsar Alexander II of Russia in March 1881, Bulgarian Prince Alexander of Battenberg attempted to crack down on liberal politicians. Afraid of persecution, Basanavičius left Bulgaria in May 1882. He traveled for several months, visiting Belgrade, Vienna, Lithuania, before settling down in Prague in December 1882. There he organized publication of Aušra, the first Lithuanian-language newspaper. The first issue appeared in March 1883 and is often cited as the beginning of the Lithuanian National Revival. Basanavičius directed the editorial policies, while Jurgis Mikšas handled printing in Ragnit in East Prussia. The newspaper then would be smuggled to Lithuania as publication in the Lithuanian language was illegal in the Russian Empire. Basanavičius soon lost editorial control of Aušra to Jonas Šliūpas. His involvement in an illegal publication prevented Basanavičius from returning to Lithuania until 1905.

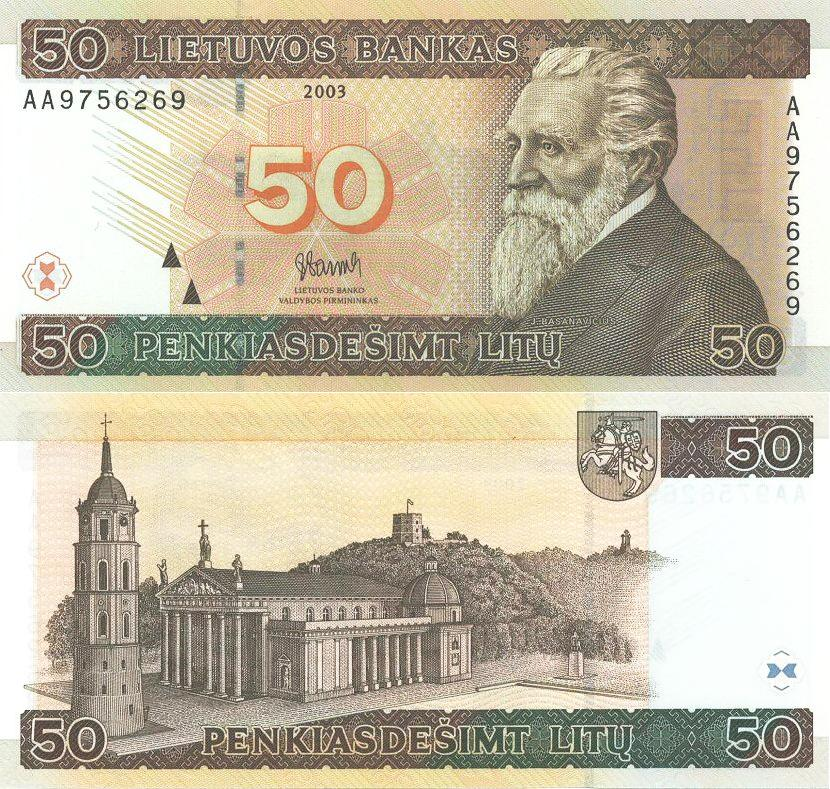
Jonas Basanavičius on 50 litas banknote, released in 2003

In Prague, Basanavičius met Gabriela Eleonora Mohl, a Bohemian German, and they married in May 1884. Immediately after the wedding, the couple moved to Bulgaria, where political situation had improved. Basanavičius first found a position in Elena, but managed to return to Lom Palanka in 1885. Life there was marked by a series of hardships. The Serbo-Bulgarian War brought a wave of war casualties to the hospital and a typhus epidemic. Basanavičius became seriously ill with pneumonia and typhus in February 1886. In August 1887, he survived an assassination attempt, but one bullet remained logged under his left shoulder blade for the rest of his life and caused various health issues. His attacker, Alexander Manoilov, served a ten-year sentence but never fully explained his reasoning. On 16 February 1889, Mohl died of tuberculosis that she apparently contracted from her dying mother while still in Prague. The death of his wife sent Basanavičius into depression and melancholy for almost a year.

In 1891, Basanavičius acquired Bulgarian citizenship and was promoted to Varna, a city of 25,000 residents, in 1892, but his health problems intensified. He suffered from arrhythmia, neurasthenia, neuralgia, paraesthesia. That prompted him to resign from public position in 1893 and limit his work to his private practice and palace visits to Ferdinand I of Bulgaria. When Nicholas II of Russia became the new Tsar in 1894, Basanavičius petitioned to be allowed to return to Lithuania but was refused. Basanavičius traveled to Austria several times searching for cures to his ailments. In 1900 he suffered a stroke and traveled to Vienna, where he had an X-ray taken which showed where the assassin's bullet was logged under the bones. Doctors refused to operate to extract it.

Despite his ailments, Basanavičius continued to work both on medical and ethnographic studies and even joined politics. In 1898, he was elected to the Bulgarian Literature Society. He traveled to East Prussia, where he campaigned on behalf of four Prussian Lithuanian candidates to the German Reichstag in the 1898 elections (Jonas Smalakys was elected). He also joined the Democratic Party and was elected to the Varna City Council from 1899 to 1903. He also participated in the party congresses and helped develop the party program on health care. However, his passion remained with Lithuanian language and culture. Despite the long distance, he collected Lithuanian tales and songs and published them in 1898–1905 in Lithuanian American presses in United States. Personally he thought that his most important work was the lifelong thesis that Lithuanians descended from Thracians and Phrygians and therefore were closely related to the Bulgarians. The thesis has not been accepted by other scholars.

== Return to Lithuania ==
=== Great Seimas of Vilnius ===
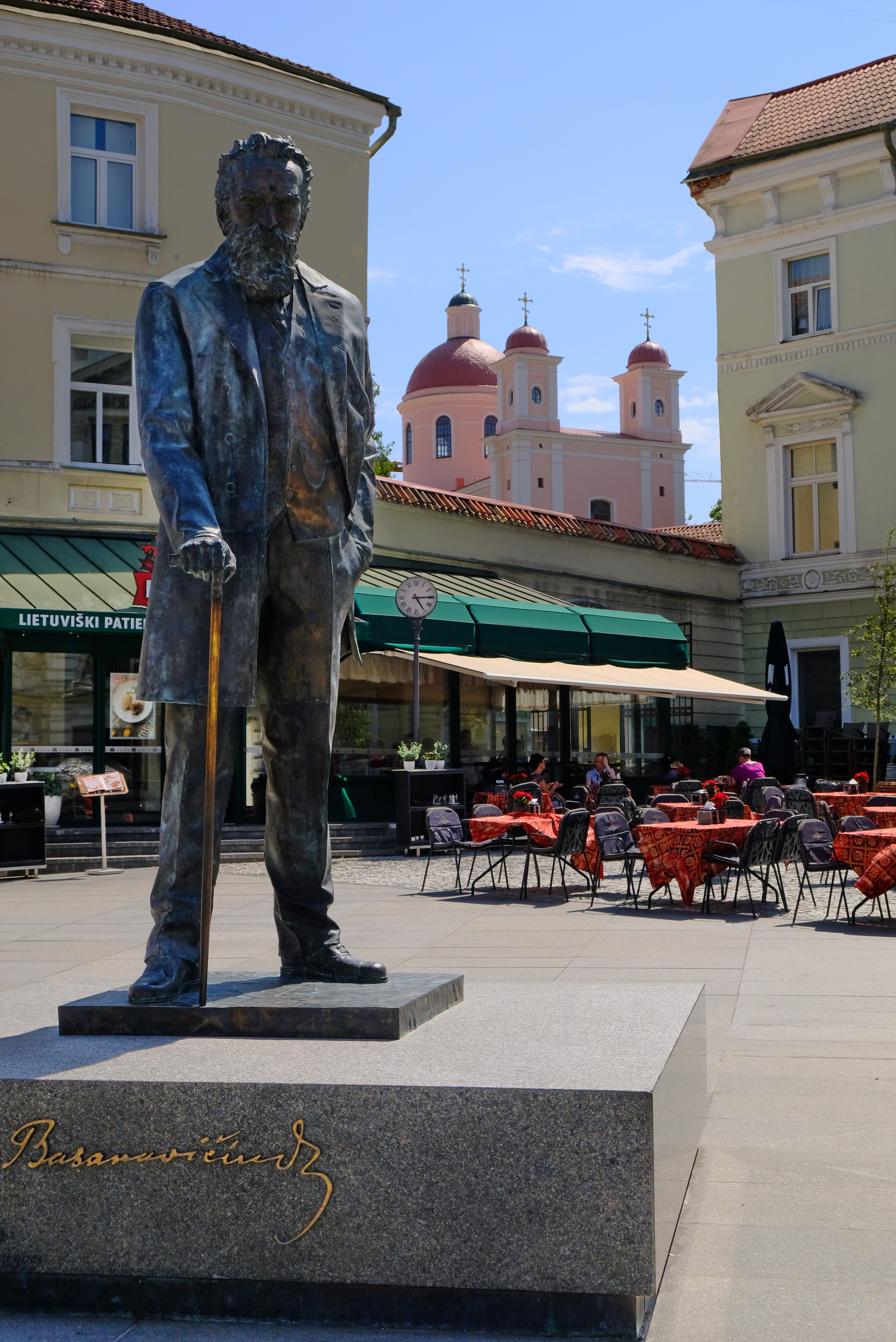
A statue in the Old Town of Vilnius, in front of the Lithuanian National Philharmonic

Russia lost the Russo-Japanese War and became engulfed in the Revolution of 1905. In Lithuania, the press ban was lifted. Basanavičius, after years of service, was entitled to receive a Bulgarian pension and considered this a good time to return to Lithuania even though he did not have a permission to return. He departed Bulgaria in May 1905 and arrived to Vilnius in August. Immediately he joined activities of Lithuanian activists and promoted the idea of a Lithuanian assembly which would become the Great Seimas of Vilnius. With help from the staff of Vilniaus žinios, a fifteen-member organizing committee was formed and Basanavičius became its chairman. In November 1905, in the name of the organizing committee Basanavičius authored a controversial memorandum to Sergei Witte, Prime Minister of the Russian Empire, which demanded autonomy for Lithuania in the Russian Empire.

Over 2,000 participants gathered on 4–5 December 1905 in Vilnius for the Great Seimas of Vilnius. Basanavičius was elected as its chairman. After loud, passionate, and intense discussions, the Seimas adopted a four-paragraph resolution which declared Tsarist government as Lithuania's most dangerous enemy and demanded autonomy for Lithuania. The resolution also called for passive and peaceful resistance to Tsarist authorities, such as not paying taxes, organizing strikes, boycotting certain products, etc. The autonomy was not achieved and the Tsarist authorities soon reestablished their control, but it laid the groundwork for establishing the independent Lithuanian republic in 1918. Using the energy generated by the Seimas, Basanavičius founded the Lithuanian National Democratic Party (Lithuanian: Tautiškoji lietuvių demokratų partija), the first nationalistic party in Lithuania but it did not gain more prominence.

As Tsarist authorities began investigating the Seimas and questioning its organizers, Basanavičius decided to leave Vilnius and traveled to Saint Petersburg. There he approached Pavel Milyukov, leader of the Constitutional Democratic Party, but found little sympathy for the Lithuanian cause. When he returned in January 1906, the police was waiting for him and he considered fleeing the country, but his Bulgarian passport was expired. The authorities questioned him, but he was not jailed. He managed to renew his passport and even obtain a one-year permit to reside in Russia. Despite his ailments and recurring health problems, Basanavičius wholeheartedly joined the election campaigns to the newly established State Duma of the Russian Empire, wrote extensively for Lithuanian press, campaigned for use of Lithuanian language in Catholic churches, continued his ethnographic research going through various archives and libraries. The issue of language in churches was particularly important to Basanavičius. When Russian authorities expelled Eduard von der Ropp, Bishop of Vilnius, from Vilnius, Basanavičius attempted to organize a delegation to Pope Pius X to convince the pope to replace Ropp with a Lithuanian bishop. That put Basanavičius in sharp conflict with Polish clergy. Basanavičius chaired a commission organizing the first exhibition of Lithuanian art, which was held in January 1907 at Vileišis Palace.

=== Lithuanian Scientific Society ===
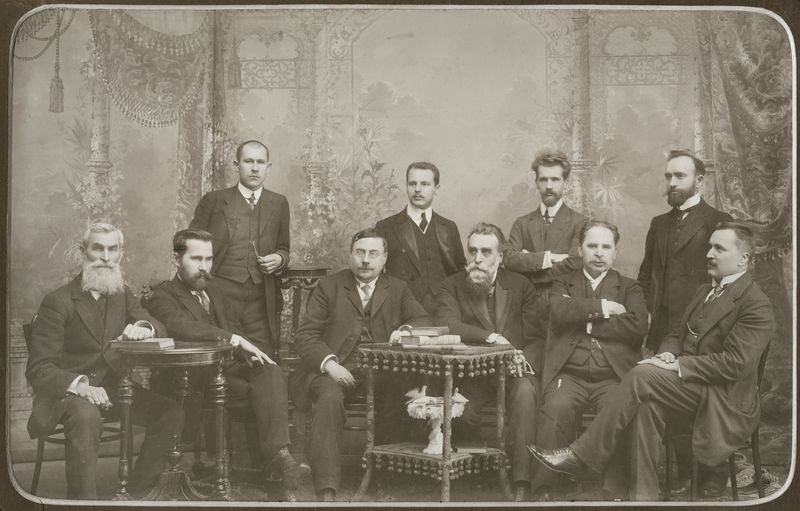
Committee of the Lithuanian Scientific Society, c. 1911. Sitting, from left: Juozas Kairiūkštis, Antanas Smetona, Augustas Niemi, Jonas Basanavičius, Antanas Vileišis and Jonas Vileišis. Standing, from left: Juozas Balčikonis, Zigmas Žemaitis, Mykolas Biržiška and Jurgis Šlapelis.

On 7 April 1907, Basanavičius, who contemplated establishing a learned society since the 1880s, formally opened the Lithuanian Scientific Society dedicated to studies of Lithuanian history and language. He was elected as the society's president and the society became the focus of his life. Basanavičius was involved to such a degree that the society was virtually identical with his person. The society published scholarly journal Lietuvių tauta (The Lithuanian Nation) which Basanavičius edited. The society also established a library, archive, and museum. The society was not welcomed by Tsarist authorities, that monitored and restricted its activities. Basanavičius campaigned for the National House, an official headquarters for the society. The society raised enough funds to buy a plot of land, but not enough to construct the house. The society and Basanavičius were criticized by younger scholars as too old-fashioned while Christian clergy attacked it for being too secular, but established new standards and levels of quality of Lithuanian scholarship.

The society organized exhibitions, two most prominent were in 1908 for the 25th anniversary of Aušra and in 1914 for the 10th anniversary of the end of the Lithuanian press ban. The society wanted to publish Lithuanian textbooks, but could not find competent authors for the books. It also planned on publishing a Lithuanian encyclopedia, but editorial disputes and financial difficulties derailed the project. The society established a four-member commission (members were Jonas Jablonskis, Kazimieras Būga, Juozas Balčikonis, and Jurgis Šlapelis) which was tasked with standardizing the Lithuanian language. After great debates, Joblonskis emerged as the leading linguist and his book on Lithuanian syntax was published by the society in 1911. The society actively campaigned against city plans to build a water tower on Gediminas Hill and further damage remains of the historic Vilnius Upper Castle; Basanavičius personally traveled to Saint Petersburg to petition the issue.

During its annual meeting in June 1913, the society decided to send a delegation to United States primarily to raise funds for the National House. It was decided that Basanavičius should go and that Martynas Yčas would accompany him. Basanavičius hesitated, citing his health issues, but agreed. They visited Lithuanian American communities on the East Coast (New York, Illinois, Pennsylvania and elsewhere). They were discouraged by lax manners of the Lithuanians, infighting between local communities, and attacks by socialists (for example, Vincas Mickevičius-Kapsukas wrote to Lithuanian American socialist press urging to boycott the donation drive). Basanavičius deeply resented such attacks as to him loyalty to one's nation far outweighed loyalty to one's class or political views. In total, they visited 84 Lithuanian communities in 120 days and collected $23,799 from some 6,000 donors. The money was not enough to build the National House and it was lost in a Russian bank during World War I.

The exhausting travel schedule further deteriorated Basanavičius' frail health. Observers agreed that he became a lot more passive, more an observer than an active participant. Basanavičius himself recognized that he had trouble speaking, remembering things, was overall weaker. He continued to join various committees and organizations, but he would not automatically become chairman. It seemed that his membership was in honor of his past services rather than in expectation of future accomplishments.

=== World War I ===
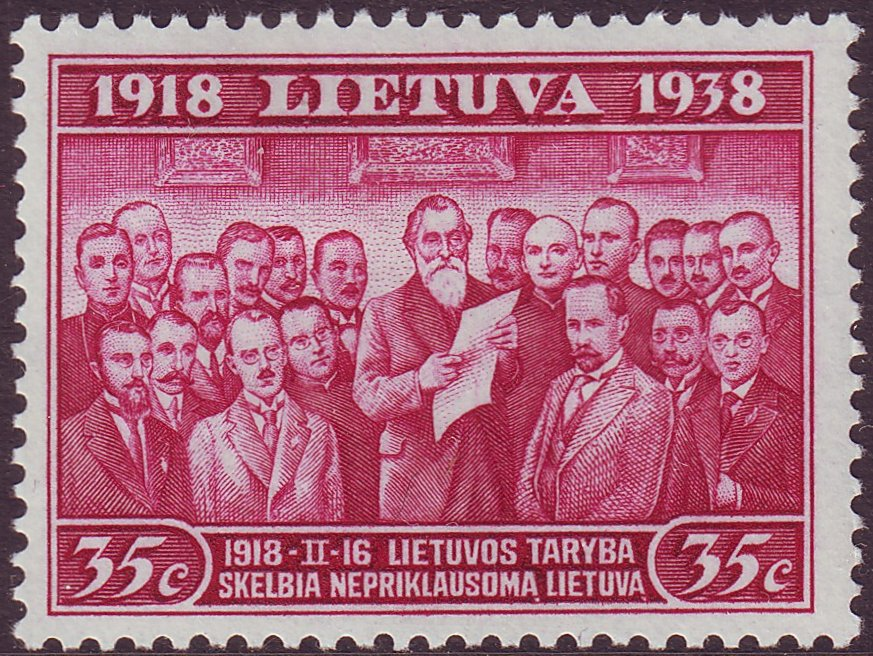
Jonas Basanavičius reading the Act of Independence of Lithuania, depicted in the Lithuanian postage stamp (1938)

At the outbreak of World War I, Basanavičius was undergoing bladder treatment in Berlin and rushed to Vilnius before the borders closed. He spent the war in Vilnius trying to preserve and protect the holdings of the Lithuanian Scientific Society and organize refugee relief efforts via the Lithuanian Society for the Relief of War Sufferers. In September 1915, Germans took over Vilnius. Many Lithuanians evacuated deeper into Russia, but Basanavičius remained in the city. Initially, the Ober Ost officials restricted Lithuanian activities and banned their press but became more lenient as the war progressed. Basanavičius concerned himself with the cultural work; for example, he obtained new premises for the library of the Lithuanian Scientific Society in summer 1917 and defended Lithuanian priests who spoke against political activities of Kazimierz Mikołaj Michalkiewicz, administrator of the Vilnius Diocese.

The Germans established the puppet Kingdom of Poland and Basanavičius co-signed several memorandums to German officials informing them of Lithuanian aspirations. He participated in the Vilnius Conference and was elected to the 20-member Council of Lithuania, but his role was more honorary and ceremonial. He formally presented thanks to the German officials for allowing the conference and sent a letter to Pope Benedict XV, but was not one of the active officers of the proceedings. On 11 December 1917, the council adopted an act that was demanded by German Chancellor Georg von Hertling and that called for "a firm and perpetual bond of alliance" with Germany. Such concessions to the Germans created a rift in the council and four members – Mykolas Biržiška, Steponas Kairys, Stanisław Narutowicz and Jonas Vileišis – resigned from the council in protest. Chairman Antanas Smetona, who supported the Act of 11 December, temporarily stepped down and Basanavičius chaired the session that adopted the Act of Independence of Lithuania on 16 February 1918. He was the first to sign the Act.

=== Later life ===
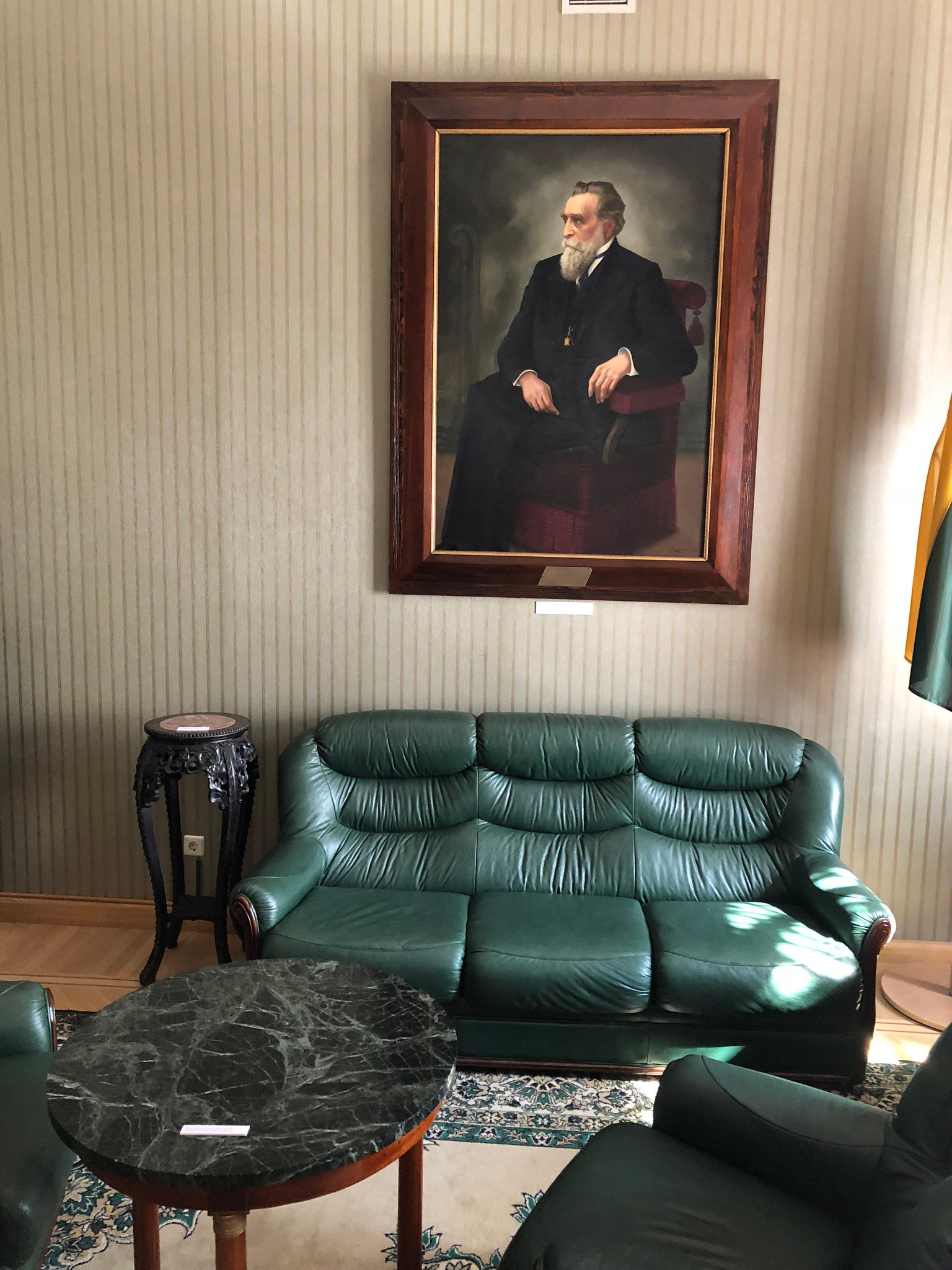
Jonas Basanavičius painting, hanging in the presidential workroom of the Historical Presidential Palace in Kaunas, Lithuania

Between January 1919 and October 1920, Vilnius changed hands and political regimes several times, but Basanavičius was little concerned with political turmoil and concentrated on cultural work. He worked with the communist regime of the short-lived Lithuanian Soviet Socialist Republic, particularly the Commissar of Education Vaclovas Biržiška, to obtain funds for the repairs of the history museum. After the city was captured by the Poles in April 1919, Polish officials harassed Lithuanian activists, confiscated the money advanced by the Soviets for the museum, raided premises of the Lithuanian Scientific Society in search for weapons, etc. Basanavičius organized lectures, helped with Lithuanian schools, and continued his cultural research. Balancing between Lithuanian and Polish interests, he refused to participate in the opening of the Stefan Batory University. In early 1920, he once again had to relocate the Lithuanian Scientific Society as the premises granted by the German authorities were returned to previous owners.

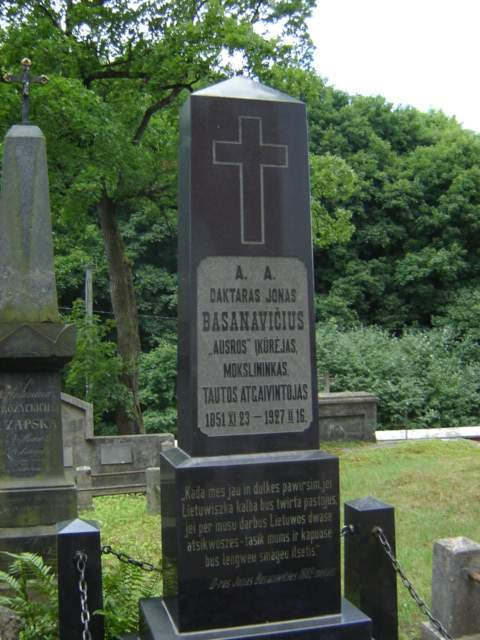
Tomb of Jonas Basanavičius in Vilnius

In May 1920, Basanavičius together with Mykolas Biržiška, Kristupas Čibiras, and Teofilius Juodvalkis traveled to Kaunas to attend the opening of the Constituent Assembly of Lithuania. Basanavičius was greeted as an honored guest and met with many dignitaries and old friends. He also visited the native Ožkabaliai before returning to Vilnius in early June. A month later, in July 1920, the city was captured by the Soviet Union and it was transferred to the Lithuanians according to the Soviet–Lithuanian Peace Treaty. But Poland recaptured the city in October 1920 during the staged Żeligowski's Mutiny. Polish authorities limited the membership in the Lithuanian Scientific Society only to the residents of Poland. Polish censorship and restrictions caused great anxiety to Basanavičius who feared that he might get arrested. His refusal to leave the city became a living symbol of the Lithuanian claims to the city. In July–November 1924, Basanavičius again visited Lithuania and received a hero's welcome. On 23 November, a day-long celebration with a special mass, concerts, and lectures for his 75th birthday was held in Kaunas.

=== Death and burial ===
Basanavičius fell in his home on 5 February 1927. He refused to go to a hospital until he completed certain writing. At the hospital of the Lithuanian Sanitary Aid Society, he was diagnosed with bladder and lung infections that his body was failing to fight. On 16 February 1927, the 9th anniversary of Lithuania's independence, he discussed matters of the Lithuanian Scientific Society and expressed wishes to attend the independence celebrations. He died that day at 6:50 pm. The Lithuanian government declared five-day mourning and sent a 12-member delegation to his funeral.

Due to the tense relations between the two countries, Poland's approval was uncertain. Despite these concerns, the Polish authorities did not impose any obstacles. The Lithuanian delegation did not travel through Riga, as had been customary for journeys between the two countries, but instead crossed a usually closed border. The Lithuanians arrived at the border station of Zawiasy (now Lazdėnai), where a specially arranged first-class train awaited to transport them to Vilnius. There, they were welcomed by members of the Lithuanian community, Danielius Alseika and Jurgis Šlapelis. Moreover, any Lithuanian citizen who wished to attend the funeral and arrived at the border was also to be allowed entry into Poland.

The Lithuanian delegation included representatives of academia, culture, and politics. Among them were: Mykolas Biržiška, Kazimieras Jokantas, Steponas Kairys, Jonas Vileišis, Fr. Juozas Tumas-Vaižgantas, Izidorius Tamošaitis, Zigmas Žemaitis, Augustinas Janulaitis, Antanas Sodeika, Vladislava Grigaitienė-Polovinskaitė, and the Bishop of Kaišiadorys, Juozapas Kukta.

Due to the arrival of the Lithuanian delegation, the funeral was postponed to February 21. At 6:00 p.m. on February 20, the body of Basanavičius was transported from the Lithuanian Sanitary Aid Society Clinic to the Vilnius Cathedral. The procession, led by Fr. Antanas Viskantas, passed along Wileńska and Adam Mickiewicz Streets (now Gediminas Avenue). It included not only Lithuanians but also Poles and representatives of other nationalities. The following day at 10:00 a.m., a funeral mass was held at the cathedral, celebrated by the Vilnius Archbishop Romuald Jałbrzykowski. The sermon, delivered first in Lithuanian and then in Polish, was given by Lithuanian priest Petras Kraujalis. This was the only time when Jałbrzykowski permitted church services in the Lithuanian language in the Vilnius Cathedral. The procession then proceeded to the Rassos Cemetery, where the burial took place at 1:30 p.m. Speeches were delivered in order by Danielius Alseika, Mykolas Biržiška, and Jonas Vileišis representing the Lithuanian side, followed by Bronisław Krzyżanowski and Ludwik Abramowicz on the Polish side. Fr. Adam Stankievič spoke on behalf of the Belarusians of Vilnius, and Zalman Reisen on behalf of the Jewish community. After further speeches, the ceremony concluded. At 6:30 p.m., a commemorative event was held in the "Kakadu" hall at 5 Dąbrowski Street (now Jakšto Street).

The Lithuanian delegation left Vilnius on February 23 on a specially arranged first-class train. Throughout the visit, both sides avoided political topics, resulting in a friendly and neighborly atmosphere. The domestic and international press viewed the event as a sign of improving relations between the two countries. However, these hopes proved unfounded, as the second half of the year saw a significant deterioration in Lithuanian–Polish relations.

== Legacy ==
A street in Varna, Bulgaria was named Dr. Basanovich Street (Bulgarian: ул. Д-р Иван Басанович) in his honour. A memorial plaque on Panagyurishte Street, Varna, marks the location of former Basanavičius residence. A memorial plaque was unveiled at Anglická 15, Vinohrady, Prague in December 2013.

Jono Basanavičiaus Street in Palanga, the most popular and biggest summer resort in Lithuania, is named after Jonas Basanavičius, who visited Palanga personally in 1924.

Basanavičius collected Lithuanian folklore, such as songs, fairy-tales, and riddles, and published 14 books during his life. In 1993–2004, folklorists Leonardas Sauka and Kostas Aleksynas organized approximately 7,000 works of folklore collected by Basanavičius and published them in the 15-volume Jonas Basanavičius Folklore Library.

A prominent bust of Dr. Jonas Basanavicius is sited on the lowest level of the Lithuanian Cultural Garden within the Cleveland Cultural Gardens in Rockefeller Park in Cleveland, Ohio. Dedicated in 1936, the bust was a gift of the Lithuanian government. The bust is a copy of an original created by prominent Lithuanian sculptor Jonas Zikaras, whose work championed Lithuanian national identity.
