= Vincas Basanavičius =

Lithuanian folklorist (1861–1910)

Vincas Basanavičius (August 1, 1861 – April 23, 1910) was a Lithuanian farmer and folklorist, and the brother of Jonas Basanavičius.

Vincas was primarily a farmer. He had close relations with his brother, and sent his recordings collected around Ožkabaliai and Bartninkai to Jonas for publishing. He collected 700 works of folk tales, 150 songs, and 134 riddles.

The former pantry room in the Jonas Basanavičius House Museum in Ožkabaliai holds the permanent exhibition of the works of Vincas.

== Publications ==
His collections were included in publications by Jonas Basanavičius:

- 1898: „Lietuviškos pasakos“ (Lithuanian Folk Tales)
- 1902: „Ožkabalių dainos“ (Songs from Ožkabaliai)
- 1903: „Iš gyvenimo vėlių bei velnių“ (From Life of Ghosts and Devils)
- 1905: „Lietuviškos pasakos įvairios“ (More Lithuanian Folk Tales)
