= Vilniaus žinios =

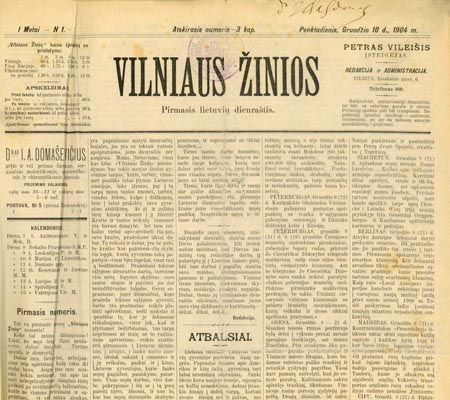
The first issue of Vilniaus žinios

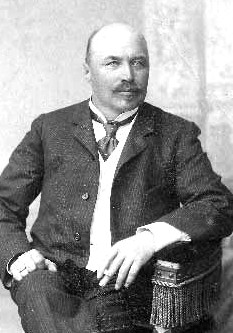
Petras Vileišis founder of Vilniaus žinios

Vilniaus žinios (literally: Vilnius news) was a short-lived newspaper published in Vilnius, Lithuania. It was the first legal Lithuanian-language daily newspaper to appear after the Lithuanian press ban was lifted on May 7, 1904.

== History ==
The first issue of Vilniaus žinios was published on December 23, 1904. It was discontinued on March 17, 1909, after 1175 issues. Vilniaus žinios was founded by Petras Vileišis, who published it in his own printing house and was officially credited as its editor. The first issues were edited by Jonas Jablonskis and Povilas Višinskis, later ones by Jonas Kriaučiūnas, Juozas Tumas-Vaižgantas, Jonas Vileišis, and others.

At first the public was interested in the newspaper and its circulation reached 6,000 copies in 1905. The newspaper's staff was instrumental in organizing the Great Seimas of Vilnius at the end of 1905. However, soon the interest started to decline as the newspaper strived to remain nonpartisan and focused on reporting news from around the country. Vilniaus žinios failed to develop its own distinct image and changed staff frequently. The Catholic peasantry was dissatisfied with the newspaper because at first it was quite anti-religious. At the end of 1906 new editor Juozas Tumas-Vaižgantas promised to abandon its secular stand. However, that did not save the newspaper as it turned away the liberal intelligentsia. The circulation dropped to 2,000 copies at the beginning of 1907 and the newspaper went bankrupt.

After a few months break Petras Vileišis revived the newspaper. In October 1907 he sold it to a corporation owned by Jonas Vileišis and others. Vilniaus žinios became geared more towards the rightist Social Democrats. This further alienated priests and Catholic peasantry, and the readership continued to diminish. In March 1909 the newspaper, largely due to financial troubles, was discontinued.
