= Trakai Castle =

Trakai Castle might refer to three separate castles in Lithuania:

- Trakai Island Castle, located on an island in Lake Galvė
- Trakai Peninsula Castle, located on a peninsula of Lake Galvė
- Senieji Trakai Castle, located in Senieji Trakai, 4 km southeast from Trakai
