= Vileišis Palace =

Coordinates: 54.6951°N 25.3054°E

Vileišių rūmai Vileišis Palace
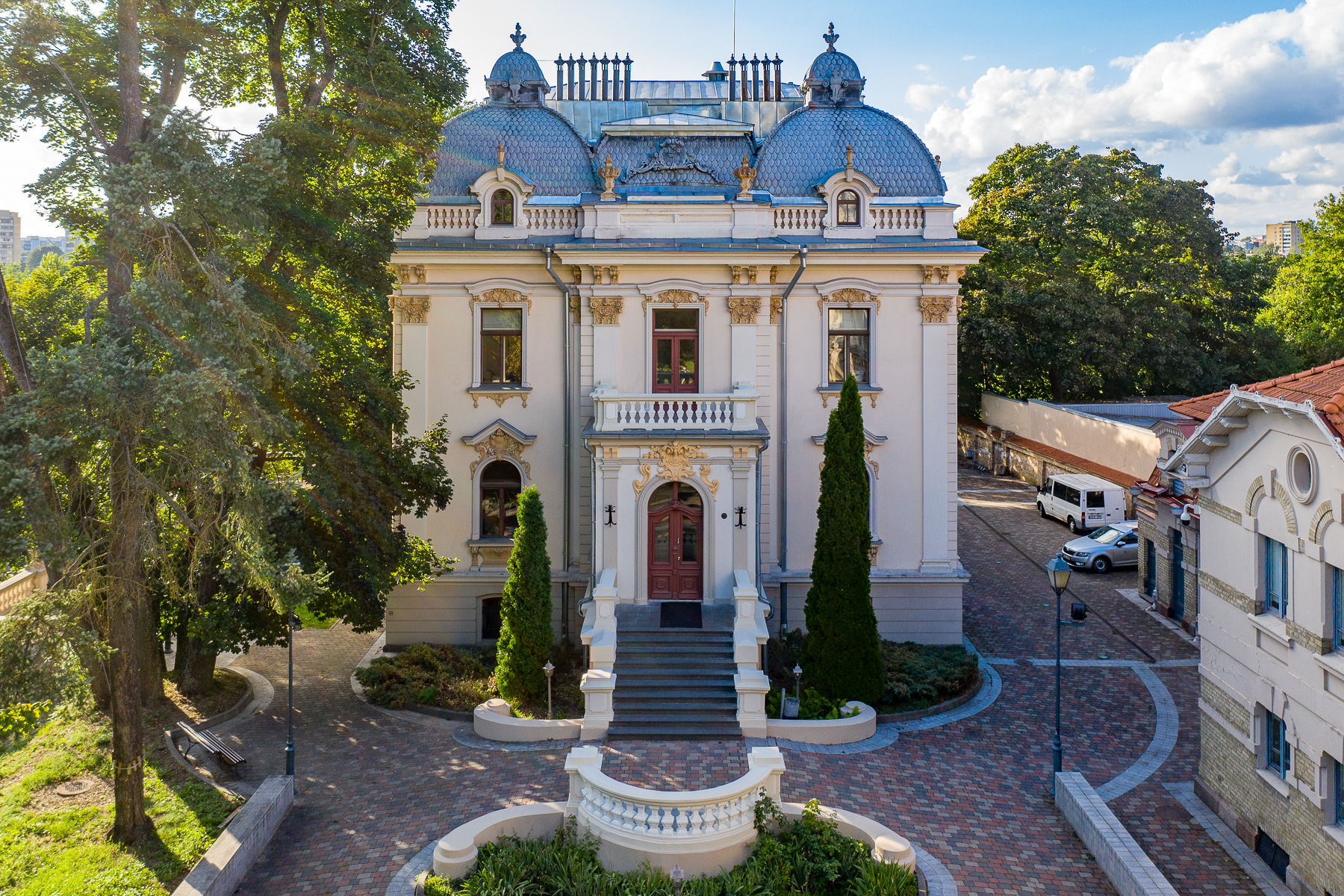
- Facade of the palace

General information
- Architectural style: Neo-baroque
- Location: Vilnius, Lithuania
- Construction started: 1904
- Completed: 1906
- Client: Petras Vileišis

Design and construction
- Architect: August Klein

Vileišis Palace is a Neo-baroque style architectural ensemble in Vilnius, Lithuania, built for Petras Vileišis. Vileišis was a prominent Lithuanian engineer, political activist, publisher, and philanthropist who commissioned the palace in 1904 and supervised its construction. The ensemble consists of a main house, a guesthouse, and an outbuilding. It currently houses the Institute of Lithuanian Literature and Folklore. It was renovated during the early 2000s.

== History ==
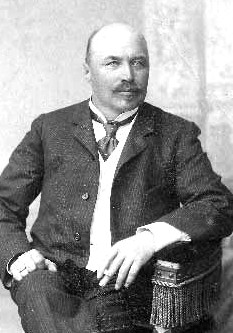
Petras Vileišis

The palace's architect, August Klein, created two blueprints, one Neo-classical and the other Neo-baroque. Vileišis selected the Neo-baroque style, because of the site's proximity to the baroque St. Peter and St. Paul's Church.

Work on the ensemble began in 1904. According to witnesses, the lime used in its construction was diluted with separated milk rather than water. Some materials not customarily used at the time were employed, such as ferroconcrete. Building materials were bought from Finland and the Netherlands. The project was completed in 1906. It was situated on a one-half hectare site, surrounded by a wrought iron fence and elaborately landscaped.

The main palace has two floors. Petras Vileišis' office and an ante-room were located on the first floor, as were a hallway, two drawing rooms and a dining room. The large chandelier in the vestibule was a gift from the workers at the Vilija factory. A terrace between the first and second floors was surrounded by a balustrade. The family's bedrooms were located on the second floor, while servants' quarters were located in the attic under the mansard roof. The interior was decorated in Neo-classical and Rococo styles, featuring crown molding, sculptural elements, and pastel tiles. Portraits, busts, and bas-reliefs of Lithuanian literary and cultural figures were displayed throughout the palace.

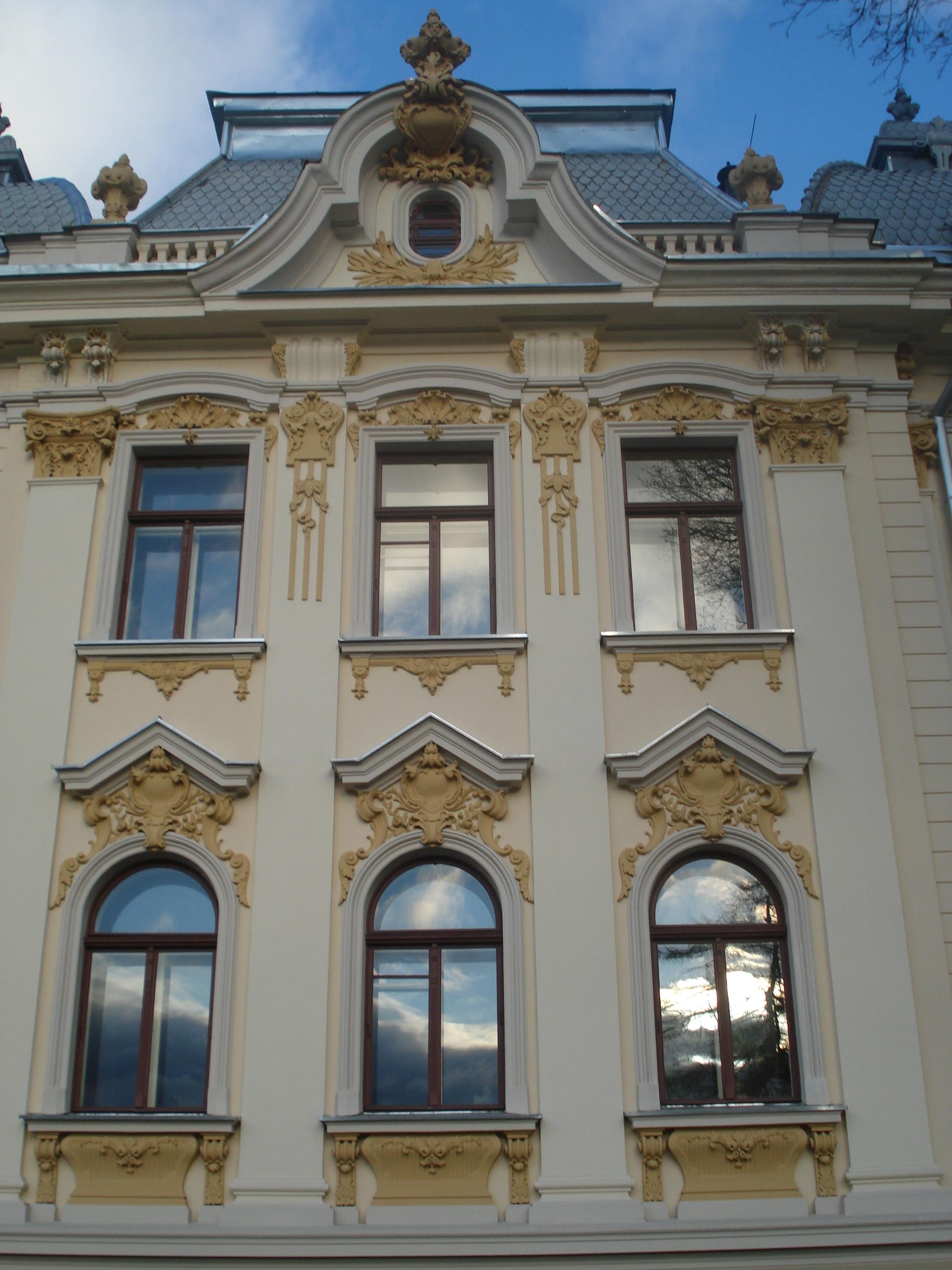
Left facade of the palace

The ensemble's guesthouse is three stories tall, with two stairways. Vileišis established a printing press for the Vilniaus žinios, the first legal Lithuanian-language daily newspaper printed in Vilnius, in the basement. The newspaper's editorial and administrative offices were on the first floor; other offices were located on its second floor. On January 9, 1907 the first Lithuanian Art Exhibition was held at the guesthouse, presenting the artwork of Mikalojus Konstantinas Čiurlionis and Antanas Žmuidzinavičius. It was the first exhibition of Čiurlionis' paintings.

The ensemble's outbuilding, constructed in yellow brick, is two stories tall. This building was used as a book bindery and as living quarters for servants.

Petras Vileišis and his family lived in the palace until World War I. In 1926, Vileišis died and the palace was inherited by his daughter, Elena Vileišytė. In 1931, she sold the entire ensemble to the Lithuanian organization Rytas for 55,000 US dollars. From 1941 to 1990 the palace housed the Lithuanian literature and Lithuanian language institutes. Since 1990, it has housed the Institute of Lithuanian Literature and Folklore.

== The Palace today ==
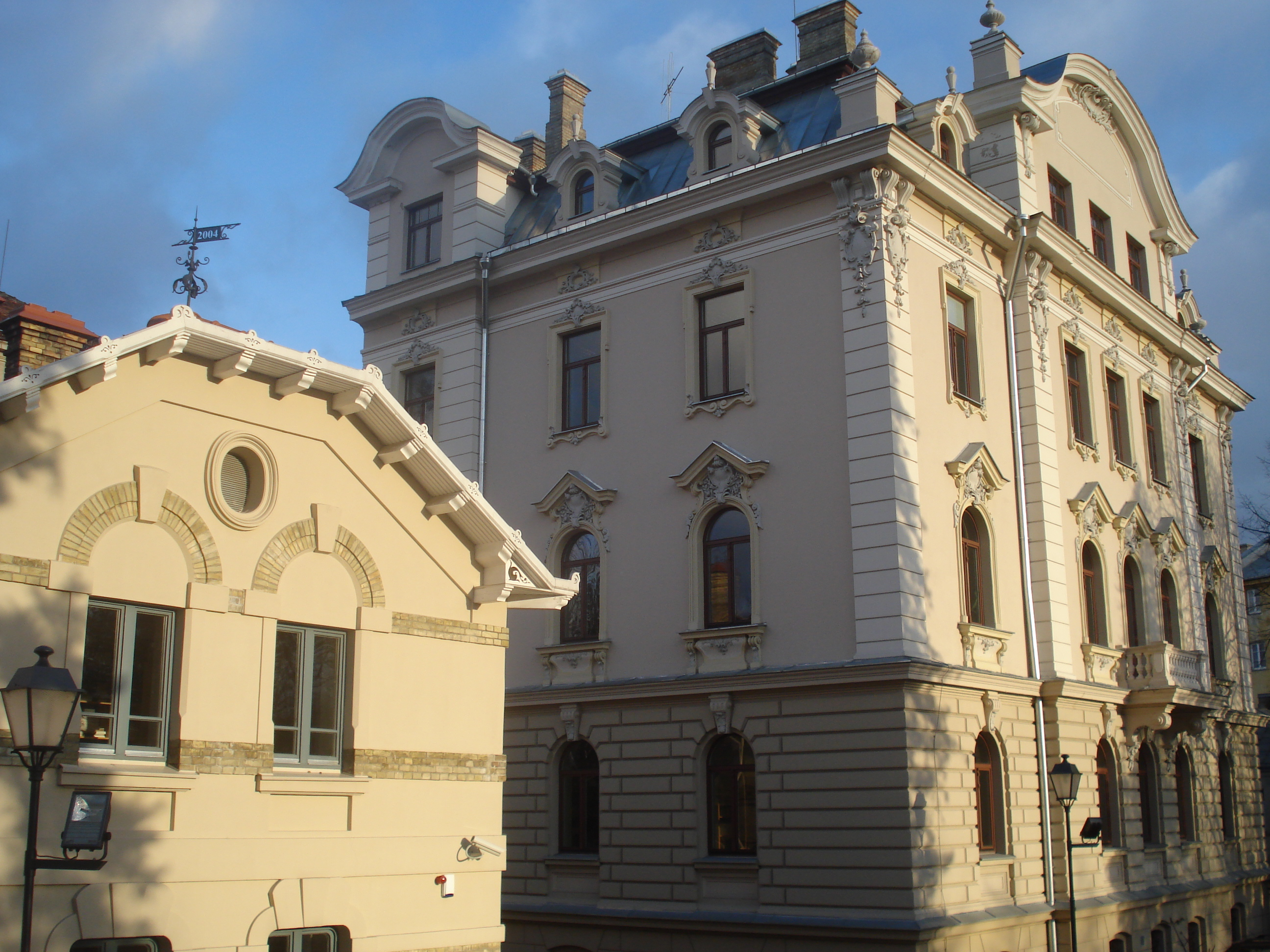
Palace from the side edge

The palace underwent three years of renovation in the early 2000s and was re-opened in 2007. Since it was structurally sound, its restoration was largely cosmetic. During the renovation, many significant historic documents were found hidden in the palace walls. However, the long-missing copies of the Act of Independence of Lithuania, signed in 1918, were not found, despite a popular belief that they were hidden in the palace. Petras Vileišis' brother, Jonas Vileišis, was one of the Act's signatories.
