= Jonas Vileišis =

Lithuanian lawyer, politician and diplomat

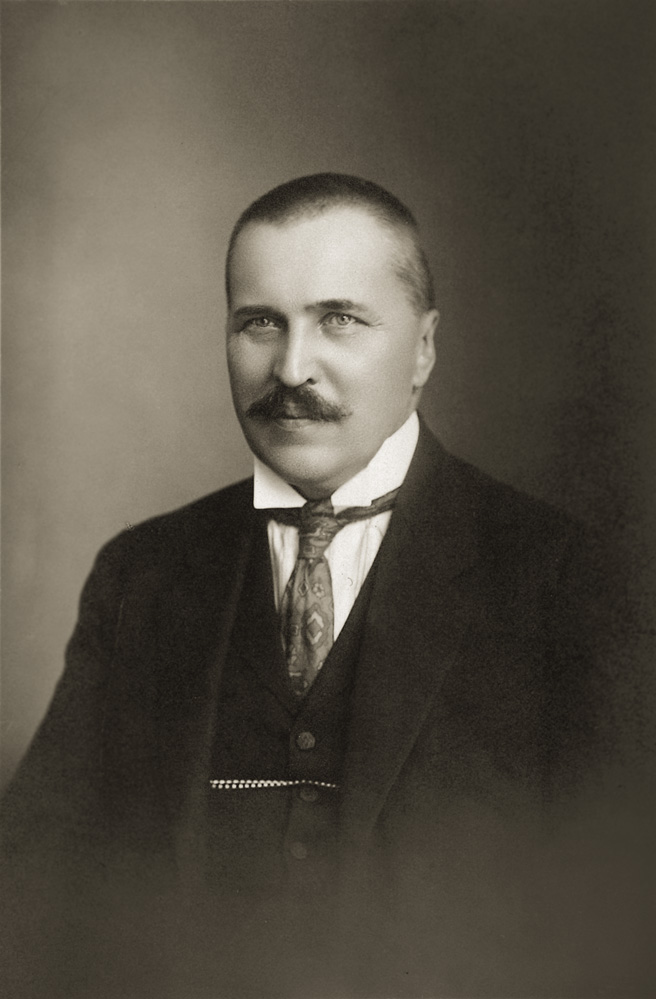
Jonas Vileišis

Jonas Vileišis (January 3, 1872 – June 1, 1942) was a Lithuanian lawyer, politician, and diplomat.

== Early life and career ==
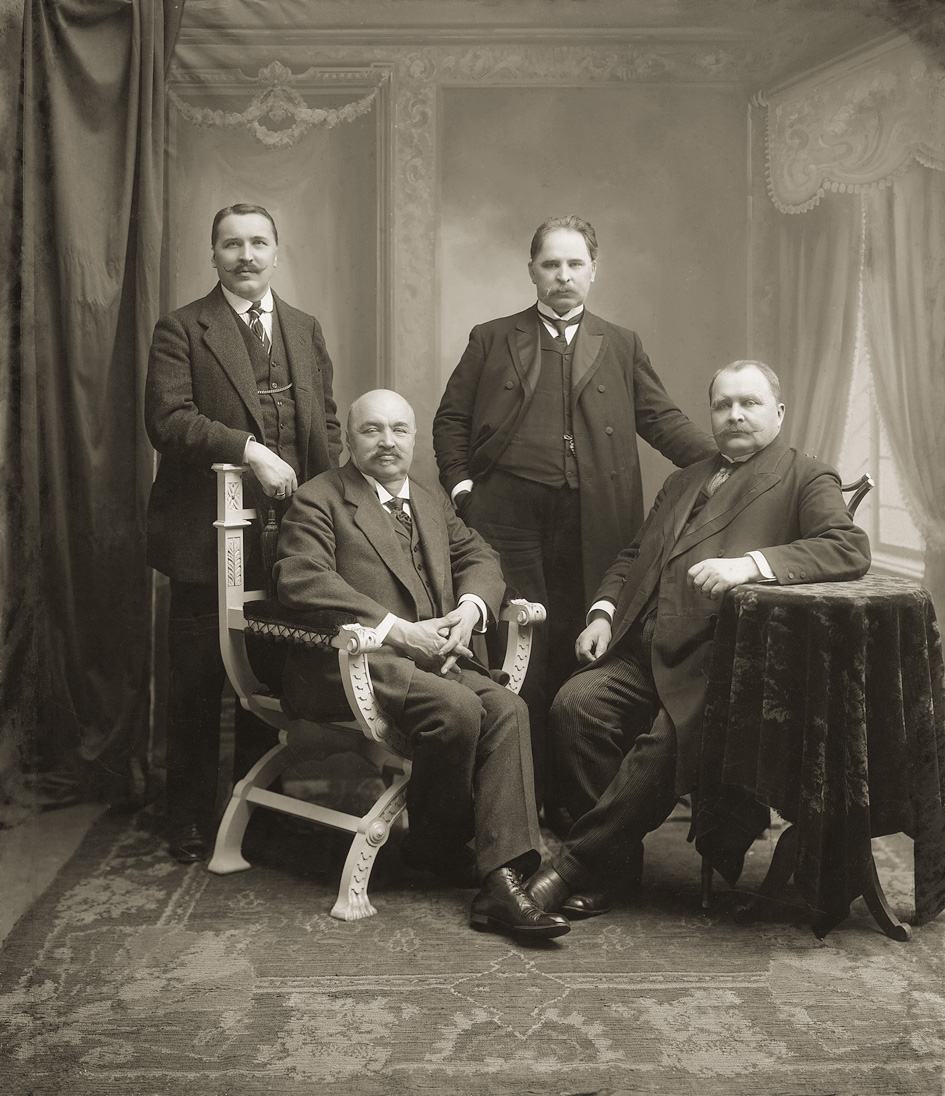
Jonas Vileišis with his brothers (standing, first from left)

Vileišis was born in Mediniai, near Pasvalys. In 1892 he graduated from the Šiauliai Gymnasium. During 1892-1894, he studied physics and mathematics at Saint Petersburg University. Later he transferred to the study of law, graduating in 1898. As a student he began contributing to the newspapers Varpas (The Bell) and Ūkininkas (The Farmer). From 1896 to 1898 he was a member of the Social Democratic Party of Lithuania. After returning to Lithuania, he began practicing law and joined the 12 Apostles organization, dedicated to defending the right to use the Lithuanian language in print, which was banned at the time. In 1902 he participated in the creation of the Lithuanian Democratic Party.

After the ban on Lithuanian language was lifted in 1904, Vileišis obtained permission to publish the newspaper Lietuvos Ūkininkas and was its editor-in-chief from 1905 to 1906. From 1907 to 1909, he served as the publisher of Vilniaus žinios (Vilnius News) and, after it was banned, published and edited Lietuvos Žinios (Lithuanian News). He was one of the organizers of the Great Seimas of Vilnius in 1905, and an organizer of the Lithuanian Science Society in 1907.

At the beginning of World War I, Vileišis co-founded a Lithuanian organization aimed at helping war victims with agronomic and legal support, and became its chairman. He was also an active member of the Lithuanian Committee. Six schools were established by Vileišis in the Alanta district. As a member of the Lithuanian Science Society he organized the publication of school textbooks. For distributing anti-German fliers among teachers, he was jailed in the Lukiškės Prison for six months and later to Germany for forced labor. In Berlin he managed to escape from prison, and he went into hiding until he was given permission to return to Lithuania.

== Political career ==
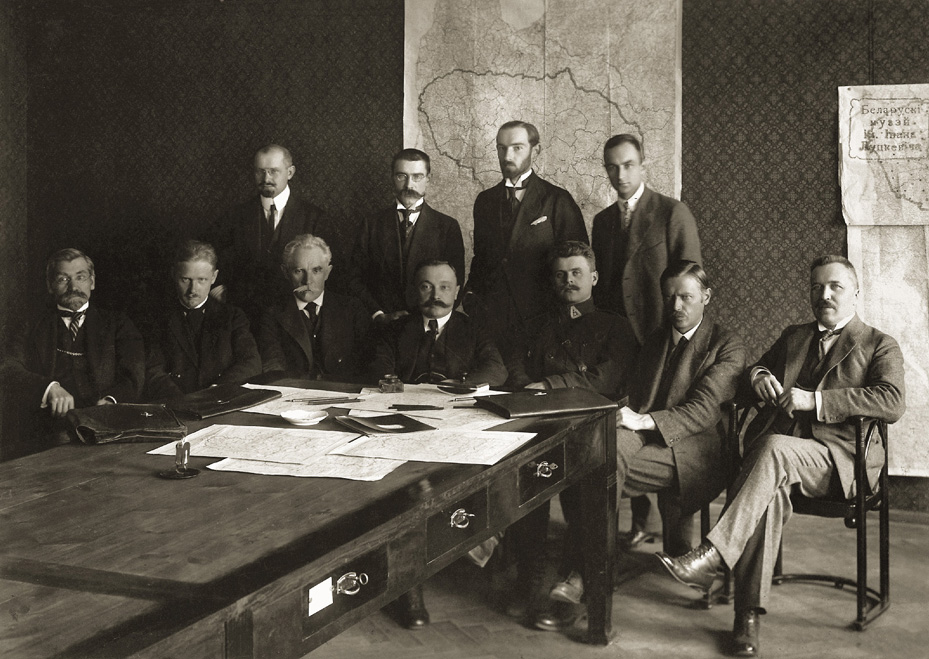
Jonas Vileišis (seated, first from right) in the Fourth Cabinet of Ministers

From 1917 to 1920, Vileišis participated in the work of the Council of Lithuania. He was the only member to oppose the Declaration of Independence of December 11, 1917, in which Lithuania promised to be Germany's satellite. Vileišis was one of the four members of the Council to resign on January 26, 1918, on the grounds that the Council of Lithuania had no right to usurp the rights of the Constituent Assembly of Lithuania, and that its authority only applied to the determination of Lithuania's future and model of the state. All twenty members of the Council voted on February 16 to the new edition brought by four members (Jonas Vileišis, Mykolas Biržiška, Steponas Kairys and Stanisław Narutowicz), that returned with new edition of Act of Independence of Lithuania. A few days afterward, together with Justinas Staugaitis and Jurgis Šaulys, he left for Germany to seek recognition of Lithuanian independence.

From 1917 to 1922 he was a member of the Lithuanian Popular Socialist Democratic Party; from 1922 to 1929 he was a member of the Lithuanian Popular Peasants' Union. In 1929 he resigned the post of Chairman of the Central Committee and from the party.

He was invited to serve in the First Cabinet of Lithuania, although he refused. On December 18, 1918, he became Minister of Internal Affairs in the Second Cabinet of Lithuania. While working as a minister he organized municipalities, appointed physicians to every county of Lithuania, and published laws governing cooperatives and army recruitment. Vileišis resigned, along with the entire cabinet, on March 12, 1919.

The Fourth Cabinet of Lithuania (June 12–October 2, 1919) appointed Vileišis Minister of Finance. He prepared a plan for Lithuanian currency reform, although it was not implemented.

In 1919 he was sent as an ambassador to the United States, where he worked to obtain recognition of the state de jure and establish financial and trade relations. He also solicited donations from the Lithuanian-American community, collecting over 1.8 million US dollars; and more importantly, he managed to unite the Lithuanian diaspora. In 1922 he was elected to the First Lithuanian parliament (Seimas), and was a presidential candidate in the June 19, 1922 elections.

== Mayor of Kaunas ==
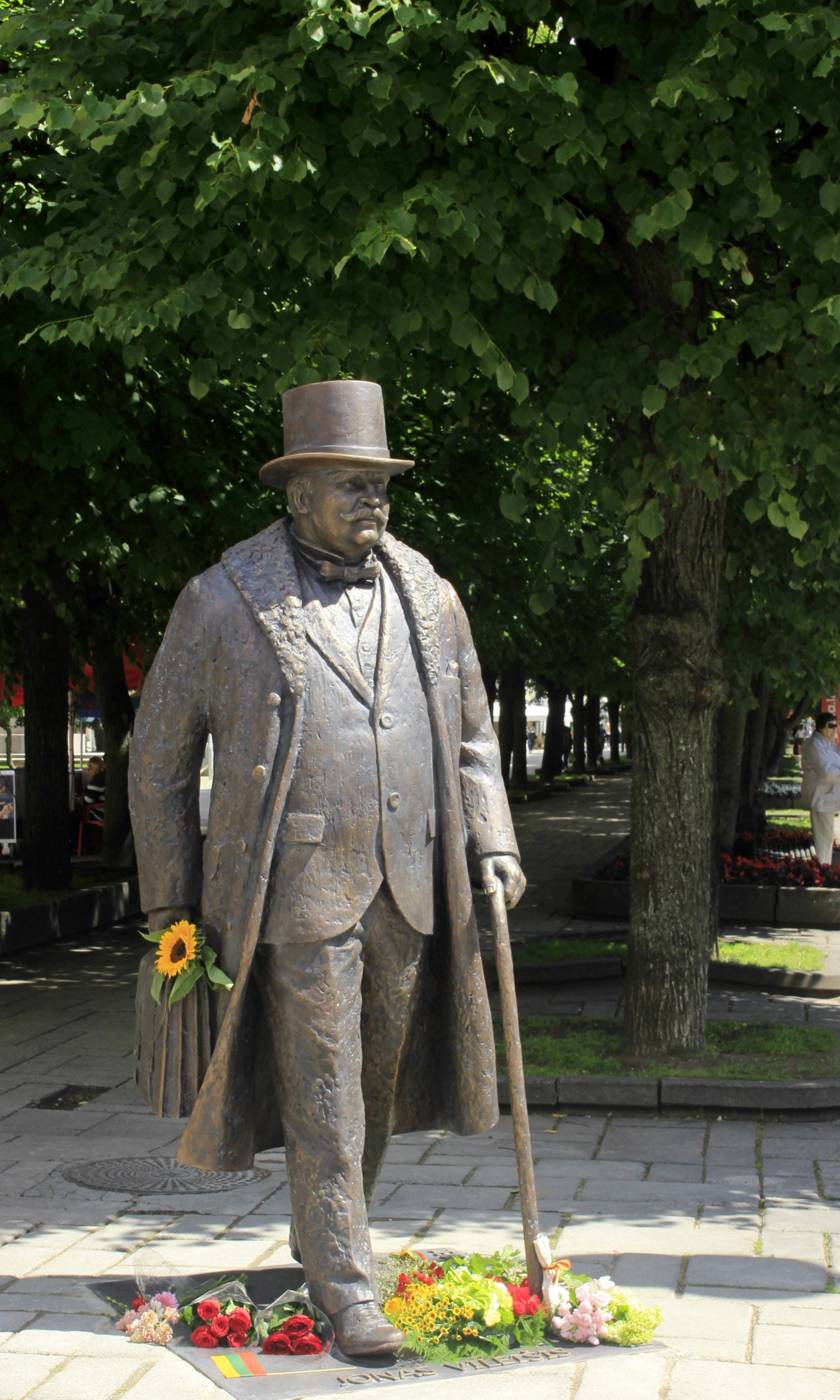
Statue of Jonas Vileišis in Liberty Avenue, Kaunas.

From September 30, 1921 until July 2, 1931, he served as mayor (Lithuanian: Burmistras) of Kaunas, the temporary capital of Lithuania. Under his direction Kaunas grew rapidly and became a truly modern city. A water and wastewater system, costing over 15 million Lithuanian litas, was put in place; the city expanded from 18 square kilometers to 40; more than 2,500 buildings were built, including three modern bridges over the Neris and Nemunas rivers. All the city streets were paved, horse-drawn transportation was replaced with modern bus lines, new suburbs were planned and built, and new parks and squares were established. The foundations for a social security system were laid, three new schools were built, and new public libraries, including the Vincas Kudirka library, were established. Vileišis maintained many contacts in other European cities, and as a result Kaunas was an active participant in European urban life.

Vileišis was also a professor at Vytautas Magnus University. On February 1, 1933, he was appointed to the State Council of Lithuania, and worked on the Civil Codecs of Lithuania.

He died in 1942 at Red Cross Hospital in Kaunas, and is buried in Vilnius' Rasos cemetery in the Vileišiai family chapel.

== Awards ==
- Order of Vytautas the Great 2nd grade, September 8, 1934.
- Honorary member of Lithuanian Lawyers society.
