= Povilas Matulionis =

Lithuanian forester and professor (1860–1932)

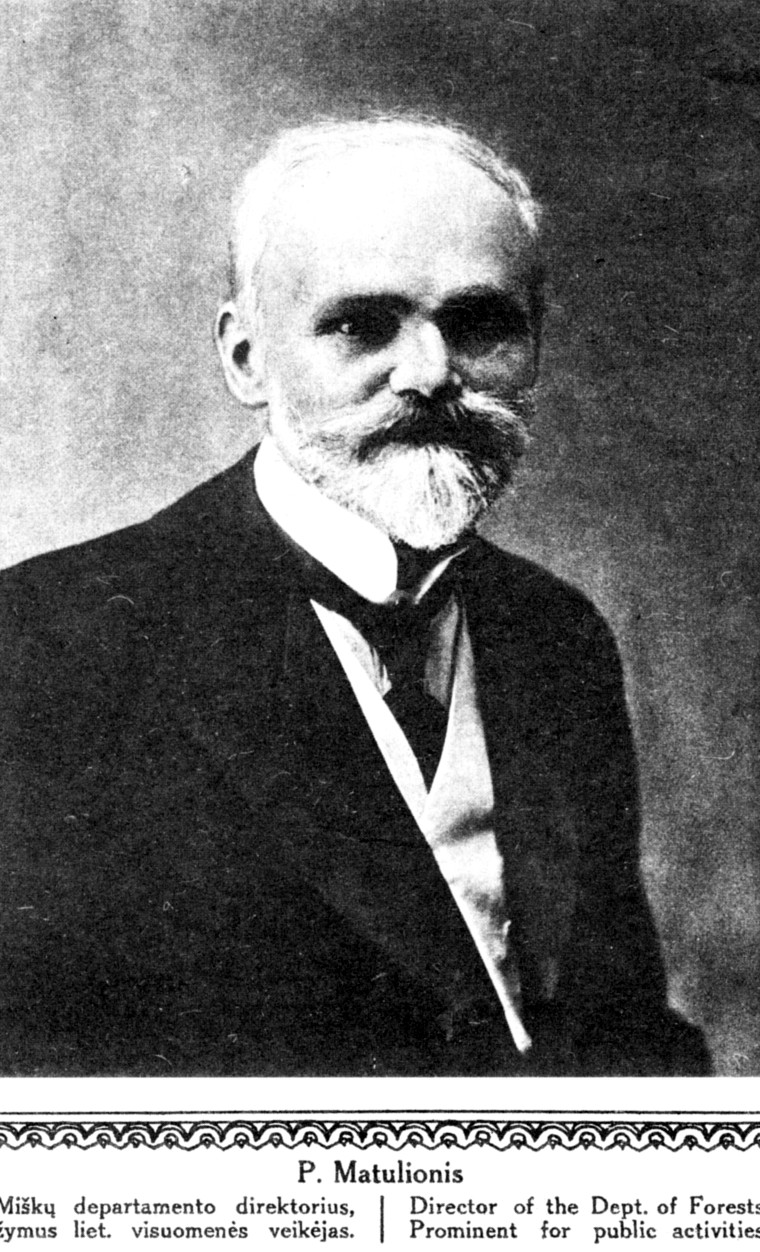
- Matulionis in Lithuania Album (1921)
- Born: 17 September 1860; Kupiškis, Russian Empire
- Died: 15 March 1932 (aged 71); Aleksandrija, Lithuania
- Education: Saint Petersburg Forestry Institute
- Occupations: Forester, professor
- Board member of: Lithuanian Mutual Aid Society of Vilnius
- Awards: Order of the Three Stars; Order of the Lithuanian Grand Duke Gediminas

Povilas Matulionis (17 September 1860 – 15 March 1932) was a Lithuanian forester, often named as the "father" of scientific forestry in Lithuania. He was an activist of the Lithuanian National Revival and vice minister of agriculture and state resources from July 1919 to January 1924.

Educated at the Forestry Institute in Saint Petersburg, Matulionis worked for the Foresters' Corps of the Russian Empire from 1889 to 1918. He lived in Vilnius in 1894–1907 which allowed him to join Lithuanian cultural life and became a member of the Twelve Apostles of Vilnius and later the Lithuanian Mutual Aid Society of Vilnius. He directed the first Lithuanian theater performances in the city and organized the first legal five-year co-ed Lithuanian school.

When Lithuania regained independence, Matulionis led the country's Forestry Department (1918–1921) and was vice minister of agriculture and state resources (1919–1924). In March–April 1919, he was effectively the minister as no minister was selected in the short-lived government of the prime minister Pranas Dovydaitis. In 1921, Matulionis started teaching forestry at the agricultural technical school in Dotnuva. He officially became professor and director of the Forestry Department of University of Lithuania in January 1923. Agricultural and forestry subjects were transferred to the dedicated Agriculture Academy in Dotnuva (present-day Vytautas Magnus University Agriculture Academy). Matulionis was the first rector of the Agriculture Academy (1924–1928). The forestry section of the academy was closed and Matulionis retired in December 1928.

Matulionis published more than 150 works, which included a number of articles and books on forestry, a dictionary of about 3,000 Lithuanian plant names, and a color poster with a calendar indicating the breeding seasons of various fish species. He compiled a topographic map of Lithuania and made a plaster model of the topography of Lithuania and Latvia in 1922. He also co-authored the first Lithuanian math textbook in 1885 and published a poetry collection in 1888.

== Biography ==
=== Early life and education ===
Matulionis was born on 17 September [O.S. 5 September] 1860 into a family of Lithuanian peasants. He was the youngest of ten children; two of his siblings died in childhood. He learned to read at home and attended a primary school in Vėžionys. He graduated with excellent grades in 1873, but his father had died and he had no funds for further education. Nevertheless, with two other local boys he enrolled into the Dinaburg Realgymnasium in November 1874.

He struggled financially and for some time slept in a dormitory hallway because he could not afford to rent a room. He later earned some money by tutoring and also received a government stipend of 150 Russian rubles per year. He was a good student, particularly in history, geography, and mathematics. He completed the main course in June 1881, but lacked chemistry which was needed to attend a technical school. Therefore, he took another year of chemistry classes. He considered various Russian educational institutions but had no funds. Convinced by a local priest, he briefly enrolled into the Kaunas Priest Seminary in 1882. He was judged unfit for military service and thus avoided conscription to the Russian Army.

In 1883, he took exams for the Institute of Civil Engineers in Saint Petersburg and was placed on a waiting list. Matulionis was briefly arrested in connection with the murder of the police chief Georgy Sudeykin. He was released but ordered to leave Saint Petersburg. He returned to Dinaburg and worked as a tutor. In 1885, he tried again and this time was accepted into the Forestry Institute in Saint Petersburg. To be admitted, he had to provide a letter from Prince Vasily Mikhailovich Dolgorukov, Governor of Vitebsk that he was not politically suspect. He was a good student and, after the second year, received a government stipend of 30 rubles per month.

=== Forestry in the Russian Empire ===
After his graduation in 1889, Matulionis was offered an assistant's position at the Forestry Institute, but he refused. Matulionis joined the Foresters' Corps of the Ministry of State Property and was assigned as a deputy forester of the forest district of Opochka in Pskov Governorate in November 1889. In Opochka, Matulionis met Sofija Rožnovska, daughter of a nobleman with Polish roots. Sofija was sixteen years his junior; they wed in May 1893. The couple had three children: a daughter and two sons.

At the beginning of his career, Matulionis was ranked as District Secretary (12th class) according to the Table of Ranks. He was promoted every few years, eventually reaching State Councilor (5th class) in 1909. In April 1892, he was assigned as junior tax collector (assessor) to the forests near Kholm. In 1894, he was assigned to Vilnius even though Catholics were not supposed to be assigned to the Northwestern Krai according to Russification policies. This allowed him to join Lithuanian cultural life in Vilnius and became a member of the Twelve Apostles of Vilnius and later the Lithuanian Mutual Aid Society of Vilnius.

In March 1898, Matulionis was promoted to senior tax collector. He worked in the forests near Kuršėnai, Rumšiškės, Karmėlava and other areas of Vilna and Kovno Governorates. That meant that he was working on site in the various forests from around April to November. Additionally, in 1900, he was tasked with taking care of the imperial park in Vilnius (present-day Vingis Park). After completing major field projects in 1904, he had a more sedentary office job until 1907.

For three months in 1906, Matulionis worked to investigate stoppages at Vidlitsky Ironworks and to restart the production. In summer 1907, he was assigned to inventory the forests near Suoyarvi in the Vyborg Governorate. At the same time, he was promoted to forest inspector (only six such positions existed in the Russian Empire in 1908). It was an untouched large forest covering some 1.4 million dessiatins. With a crew of 18 people, Matulionis completed the task by 1909.

In 1908, the Russian Empire established twelve forestry regions, each of which covered several governorates. Matulionis was appointed as the chief of the 2nd region covering four governorates with the headquarters in Veliky Novgorod. In 1910, the regions were reorganized increasing their number to fifteen. He remained chief of the 2nd region which was enlarged to cover six governorates (Estonia, Livonia, Courland, Novgorod, Smolensk, and Vitebsk Governorates) and moved its headquarters to Smolensk where Matulionis lived during World War I.

During the war, Matulionis participated in the activities of the Lithuanian Society for the Relief of War Sufferers in Smolensk. He supported the proposed nationalization of forests after the February Revolution. After the October Revolution, the new Bolshevik government eliminated the position of forest inspector. Matulionis was appointed as the forestry commissar of Vitebsk Governorate and was tasked with inventoring the nationalized forests. He was chairman of a revolutionary committee in Smolensk and he was considered for the position of forestry commissar of the entire Soviet Russia.

=== Activism in Vilnius ===
In 1894, Matulionis was posted to Vilnius and joined city's Lithuanian cultural life. According to Felicija Bortkevičienė, to get the job in Vilnius, he took a pay cut and obstructed those of his promotions that would have him posted in Russia. She further claimed that Matulionis spent one-third of his salary on Lithuanian activities. He used his status as a Tsarist official to help Lithuanian activists avoid trouble with the Tsarist authorities.

==== Twelve Apostles of Vilnius ====
Around 1894–1895, several Lithuanians in Vilnius gathered in an informal club which became known as the Twelve Apostles of Vilnius. Matulionis was one of its first members though as a Tsarist official he avoided public association with the group. At the time, no church in Vilnius held masses in Lithuanian. Therefore, the first major task of the club was to get the Church of Saint Nicholas assigned to the Lithuanian community. Matulionis, Donatas Malinauskas, Andrius Domaševičius, and Kazimieras Landsbergis delivered the first known petition with about 300 signatures to the auxiliary bishop Ludwik Zdanowicz in May 1896, but it was rejected.

In 1900–1901, the club organized three secret and illegal amateur theater performances that were directed by Matulionis. In primitive conditions, club members staged simple comedies by Johann Baptist von Schweitzer, Józef Bliziński, and Žemaitė with Gabrielė Petkevičaitė-Bitė.

==== Lithuanian Mutual Aid Society of Vilnius ====
The club of Twelve Apostles established the official and legal Lithuanian Mutual Aid Society of Vilnius in January 1904. Matulionis was elected to its board during the founding meeting on 14 March 1904. He was briefly society's chairman in 1906 replacing Antanas Vileišis and was selected as honorary member of the society in 1908.

With the Lithuanian Mutual Aid Society, Matulionis worked to establish a shelter for children at the Church of Saint Nicholas and then transform it into a legal five-year co-ed Lithuanian school. Matulionis and Antanas Vileišis were the official founders of the school in March 1907. They also organized a shelter for Lithuanian female servants that opened in October 1906 (these activities later grew into the independent Society of Saint Zita).

During 1905, Matulionis directed several plays that the Lithuanian Mutual Aid Society organized in hopes of raising funds for its operations. However, such cultural evenings were in competition with the events organized by the Kanklės of Vilnius Society chaired by Gabrielius Landsbergis-Žemkalnis; Matulionis disliked Landsbergis-Žemkalnis and became less active in the amateur theater. His last play was the historical tragedy Živilė by Vincas Nagornoskis staged in fall 1908. Theater historian Vytautas Maknys considered Landsbergis-Žemkalnis to be the "father of Lithuanian theater", while Jonas Strazdas-Jaunutis and Romualdas Deltuvas argued that it should be Matulionis.

==== Political activities ====
Matulionis and others wrote a letter to Tsar Nicholas II thanking him for lifting the Lithuanian press ban in May 1904. It was signed by 155 Lithuanian activists. Varpas criticized the letter and the activists as bootlickers, but the letter was not actually delivered to the Tsar as it read more like a veiled complaint about Russification than a genuine expression of gratitude.

During the Russian Revolution of 1905, Matulionis joined a revolutionary committee in Vilnius and signed a protest letter against excesses of the Tsarist police. He helped organize the Great Seimas of Vilnius and personally delivered a request to allow the Seimas to the Governor-General of Vilnius, but did not officially participate in it. He joined the National Party of Democrats (Tautiškoji demokratų partija) which was organized a few days after the Seimas.

Matulionis was a critic of the bishop of Vilnius Edward Ropp. He published a feuilleton in Vilniaus žinios attacking Ropp when he suspended the Lithuanian priest Juozapas Ambraziejus. He also signed a letter, first published in the Russian press, criticizing the organizers of the First Lithuanian Art Exhibition for inviting Ropp to its opening. Matulionis later recanted his signature.

==== Other societies ====
In January 1905, Matulionis became one of the co-founders of the Aušra book publishing company which was initiated by Jonas Jablonskis. He also assisted in organizing the Lithuanian Scientific Society and was elected its vice-chairman during its founding meeting in April 1907. He became a member of a committee working to build the National House, headquarters for the society, but it was never built due to financial difficulties and the start of World War I. In 1908, Matulionis donated 114 books to the society's library.

In December 1907, the 6th meeting of the illegal Union of Lithuanian Teachers took place at his apartment. Matulionis was also a member of Žiburėlis society which provided financial aid to Lithuanian students; the short-lived Vilniaus Aušra that organized Lithuanian primary schools in Vilnius Region (predecessor of Lithuanian Education Society Rytas); and the Lithuanian Art Society which organized exhibitions of Lithuanian art.

=== Independent Lithuania ===
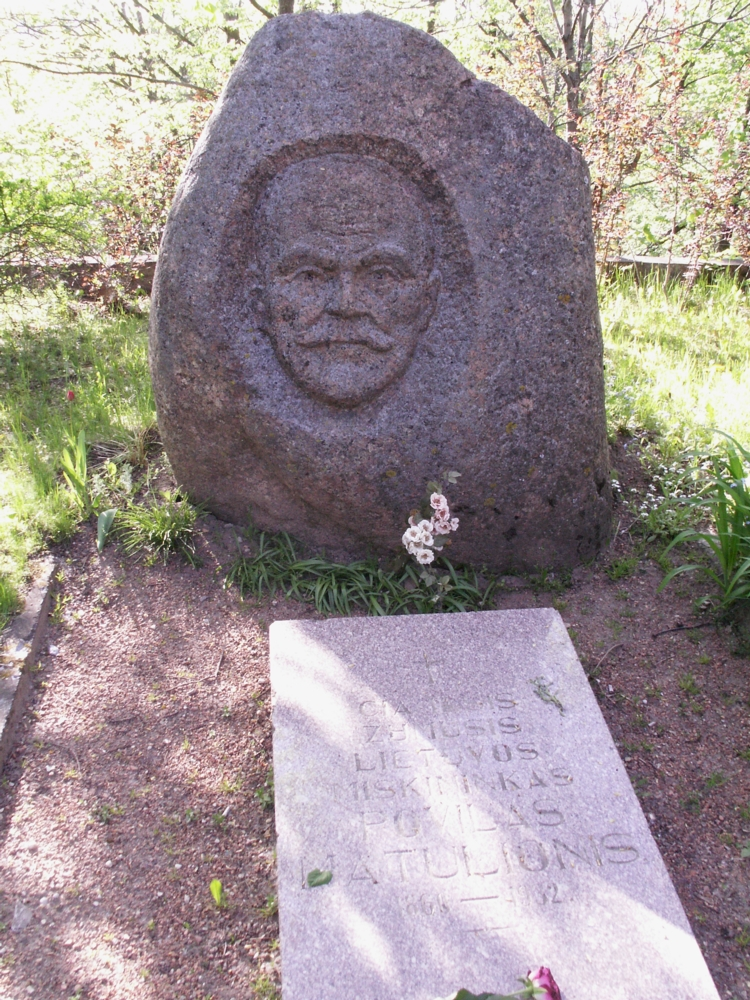
Grave of Matulionis

Matulionis returned to Lithuania on 22 November 1918. His two sons volunteered for the Lithuanian Army and fought in the Lithuanian Wars of Independence. The newly formed government of Lithuania appointed Matulionis to lead the Forestry Department on 25 November 1918; he continued in this role until 7 March 1921. He organized forestry inspectorates, hired personnel, and took measures to stop rampant logging. From 22 July 1919 to 10 January 1924, he was the vice-minister of agriculture and state resources. Twice he refused to become the minister. In March–April 1919, Matulionis was effectively the minister as no minister was selected in the short-lived government of the prime minister Pranas Dovydaitis. He was a candidate of the Party of National Progress in the April 1920 election to the Constituent Assembly of Lithuania but was not elected.

In 1921, Matulionis started teaching forestry at the agricultural technical school in Dotnuva. In 1922, he became a lecturer at the Higher Courses which were reorganized into the University of Lithuania. He officially became university professor and director of the university's Forestry Department on 29 January 1923. However, it was decided to separate agricultural and forestry subjects from the university and establish a dedicated academy. On 24 September 1924, Matulionis became the first rector of the Agriculture Academy in Dotnuva (present-day Vytautas Magnus University Agriculture Academy). Matulionis headed the department on forest management. In May 1927, the Lithuanian government decided to close the Forestry Department as it felt there were too many foresters in Lithuania. The department was closed and Matulionis was dismissed from his position in December 1928.

As the vice minister, Matulionis supported the zoologist Tadas Ivanauskas and helped him establish the Nature Research Station with a museum that grew to become the Tadas Ivanauskas Zoological Museum. In 1921, Matulionis became a co-founder of the Society for the Beautification of Lithuania. Sometime before 1924, Matulionis established a breeding facility of the common whitefish near Antalieptė. In 1925, Matulionis became a member of the Finnish Forestry Society.

Matulionis retired on 1 January 1929. He first lived in Kupiškis near his birthplace before moving to live with his daughter in Aleksandrija near Šiauliai. He died there of pneumonia on 15 March 1932. As Matulionis had turned from Roman Catholicism to freethought, he asked to be buried in an unconsecrated plot. He was buried on a hill in Aleksandrija near the Šiauliai–Panevėžys road.

== Works ==
In total, Matulionis published more than 150 works.

=== Articles and periodicals ===
In 1885, as a student in Saint Petersburg, Matulionis published a couple of issues of Lithuanian newsletter Žinių nešėjas using a hectograph in violation of the Lithuanian press ban. He published his first articles in 1887 in Lietuviškasis balsas which was published by Jonas Šliūpas in the United States. During the press ban, he contributed articles to Varpas and Tėvynė, and poetry to Vienybė lietuvninkų. In 1891, he published an article about Kupiškis and its people in Vienybė lietuvninkų. It provided historical, economic, and ethnographic information about the town – it was the first local history article in Lithuanian. Matulionis belonged to the democratic circle of Vincas Kudirka and supported the publication of Varpas. In 1898, he attended a gathering of Varpas publishers held in the apartment of Andrius Domaševičius in Vilnius.

After the press ban was lifted in 1904, Matulionis published articles in Lietuvių laikraštis, Vilniaus žinios, Lietuvos ūkininkas, Šviesa, Viltis, Lietuvos balsas, Draugija, Vairas, Kultūra, Kosmos, and other Lithuanian periodicals. One of his last published articles was about the history of forest cover in Lithuania from 1000 to 1900.

Matulionis also published articles in the Russian press, including in the journal Lesnoy zhurnal of the Russian Scientific and Technical Forestry Society. His first Russian article on the pine sap in Lithuania was published in 1897.

Matulionis contributed forestry-related articles to the Lietuviškoji enciklopedija, the first Lithuanian encyclopedia.

=== Books ===
Encouraged and sponsored by the Catholic priest Jonas Katelė, Jonas Spudulis and Matulionis published the first Lithuanian math textbook for the illegal Lithuanian village schools in 1885. The textbook covered basic arithmetic with integers, fractions, and measurements. It included a short Lithuanian–Polish glossary which contributed to the creation of Lithuanian terminology in mathematics.

In 1907, the printing press of Martynas Kukta published the second volume of Žolynas, a dictionary of about 3,000 plant and mushroom names that Matulionis worked on for fifteen years. The planned first volume with the description of plant morphology and illustrations was never published. The dictionary provided plant names in Latin followed by Lithuanian, Russian and Polish translations. Matulionis mainly used works of Jurgis Pabrėža and Laurynas Ivinskis for the Lithuanian names and plant classification from Plantesamfund by Eugenius Warming.

While living in Smolensk, he worked on Gamtos žodynas, a Lithuanian–Russian dictionary of nature. He complied about 8,000 words up to the letter S, but it remained unfinished.

In independent Lithuania, Matulionis published numerous practical and educational books and booklets for the foresters. He studied plant pathology, silviculture, growth rate of forests, forest cover, etc. In 1919, he published a forest classification table which was developed into the first classification of Lithuanian forests based on forest soils. He divided forests into three groups and ten types. However, this classification was incomplete, not sufficiently specific, and not very practical. He published works on forest management (1920), cattle grazing in forests (1921), how many trees can be sustainably cut (1924), seed-tree method for natural forest regeneration (1925). These were the first forestry textbooks in Lithuanian. He also published a guide to woody plant classification (1923) and a guide to identifying trees and shrubs which was translated from Russian (1924).

In 1922, Matulionis published a 21-page booklet about Baltic amber, which was the first Lithuanian work on the subject.

=== Posters ===
In 1903, Matulionis published a color poster with a calendar indicating the breeding seasons of fishes, that is, when fishing for them was prohibited. The calendar listed 38 different species of fishes in Russian, Polish, Lithuanian, and Latin. Lithuanian publications in the Latin alphabet were banned from 1864, but Matulionis managed to received permission for the publication from Pyotr Sviatopolk-Mirsky, governor general of Vilnius, who not only approved the calendar but also ordered it to be displayed in volost offices.

The calendar was published as a supplement to a report of the Vilnius chapter of the Imperial Russian Society of Fish Farming and Fisheries (Matulionis was its secretary until 1906 and later an honorary member). It was well received and even awarded a bronze medal at the Vilnius agricultural exhibition. It was republished by the Polish journal Okólnik rybacki spreading the concept of fishing and hunting calendars in Western Europe.

Matulionis published a poster with a calendar of Lithuanian forest trees (1919) that provided information on the timing of tree blooming, ripening of fruits, and seed harvesting. He also published a poster with types and subtypes of forestry systems (1922).

=== Maps ===
While living in Vilnius, Matulionis worked on a Lithuanian map of Lithuania that would show the boundary between Lithuanian and Slavic territories. According to press reports from early 1907, the map was near completion and Matulionis, Juozas Tumas, and Vladas Mironas worked on publishing it. However, they were hampered by the lack of information on Lithuanian placenames. When Matulionis was reassigned to work in Finland in 1907, he left the map to the Lithuanian Scientific Society. The map was lent to Bronius Kazys Balutis who then worked as a cartographer for Rand McNally. Balutis spent considerable effort in adding placenames and hydronyms. He was unable to cover Lithuania in full and published a color map of Suvalkija in 1915.

Using smaller topographic maps by Germans and Russians, Matulionis compiled a topographic map of Lithuania in 1918–1920. Its scale was 1:630,000 and it showed elevation changes every 30 sazhens (64 meters). It marked settlements as well as all major bodies of water (rivers, lakes, bogs). The map was published in Berlin in 1924. Using this map, Matulionis made a plaster model of the topography of Lithuania and Latvia in 1922 – the first such model in Lithuania. The model was manufactured by the evacuated Vilija factory in Smolensk. The model measures 45 by 49 centimetres (18 in × 19 in). Its scale is 1:1,260,000 for area and 1:10,000 for elevation. It marked 88 cities and was accompanied by a 16-page booklet which listed highlands and hills with their elevation and main rivers with their length and elevation at source (it did not list lakes). In 2022, Kupiškis Ethnographic Museum organized a conference and exhibition dedicated to the 100th anniversary of this topographic model.

=== Poetry ===
Matulionis published his first five poems in Lietuviškasis balsas; they were patriotic poems on historical topics that resembled poetry of Vincas Kudirka. Margumynai (Varieties), a collection of poems by Matulionis, was published in the United States by Jonas Šliūpas in 1888. It included the first Lithuanian translation of an excerpt from Faust by Johann Wolfgang von Goethe. In 1901, Matulionis' four-act drama Laimė iš svetur (Happiness from Abroad) was published by Juozas Tumas-Vaižgantas in Tėvynės sargas.

Matulionis was one of the first realist Lithuanian poets who departed from romantic poetry published in Aušra. He wrote the poems in his youth when he lived far away from native Lithuania. He followed examples of Russian realist poetry and was influenced by Russian youth's nihilism and proletarianism. His poems depict social injustice and poverty that weigh down and crush a common man in a stagnating Lithuanian village. The topic of social injustice rose more from sympathy and humanism rather than political considerations. Matulionis used gloomy images of harsh nature to paint the image of painful existence of a Lithuanian villager. The poems were gray and rough with drastic details.

== Legacy ==
The street where Matulionis lived in Kupiškis was named after him in 1932; it was renamed after Maxim Gorky in 1951. A smaller street near the city's 2nd Secondary School was named after Matulionis in 1986. The Gorky and Matulionis streets swapped their names in 1988. Other streets named after Matulionis are located in Vilnius, Mažeikiai, and Akademija.

In 1982, for his 50th death anniversary, a traditional roofed pole was erected and 72 oak trees (one for each year he lived) were planted near his grave.

The house where Matulionis was born in Kupiškis became his memorial museum in September 1990 (his 130th birth anniversary). At the same time, a roofed pole by sculptor Antanas Česnulis was installed in the yard. The museum was owned and operated by the Kupiškis Forest District and closed after the forest district reorganization in 2018–2019. However, the house remains on the Registry of Cultural Property (added in 1997).

On 1 September 1996, Kupiškis 2nd Secondary School was renamed after Matulionis (it is now Kupiškis Povilas Matulionis Progymnasium). The school inherited exhibits from the closed memorial museum. It erected a roofed pole (sculptor Česnulis) in 2010 and added an outdoor mural (artist Marius Skrupskis) in 2022 in Matulionis' memory.

In 1934, the Academy of Agriculture in Dotnuva opened a memorial board with a bas-relief portrait of Matulionis by sculptor Vincas Grybas. It was lost during World War II. In 1994, a bust by sculptor Marijus Petrauskas was installed in the square in front of the central building of the academy. The academy also opened a cabinet dedicated to works of Matulionis. It contains Matulionis' bas-relief by Vladas Žuklys and portrait painting by Adolis Jonas Krištopaitis.

In 2010, the Lithuanian Academy of Sciences established the Povilas Matulionis Award for the best forestry works.

== Awards ==
Matulionis received the following awards:

- Orders of Saint Stanislaus (3rd class in 1898 and 2nd class in 1904)
- Orders of Saint Anna (3rd class in 1901 and 2nd class in 1904)
- Order of the Three Stars (1927)
- Order of the Lithuanian Grand Duke Gediminas (2nd degree, 1928)
- Independence Medal (1928)
- Honorary doctorate of the University of Lithuania (1929)
- Silver Medal of the Liberation of Klaipėda

== Bibliography ==
- Aničas, Jonas (1999). Antanas ir Emilija Vileišiai: Gyvenimo ir veiklos bruožai (in Lithuanian). Alma littera. ISBN 9986-02-794-2.
- Aničas, Jonas (2001). Petras Vileišis 1851–1926 (in Lithuanian). Vilnius: Alma littera. ISBN 9986-02-958-9.
- Auksoriūtė, Albina (2019). "Povilo Matulionio Žolyne pateiktų augalų genčių vardų autoriniai šaltiniai". Bendrinė kalba (in Lithuanian). 92: 1–23. ISSN 2351-7204.
- Banionis, Juozas (2014). Matematinės minties raida Lietuvoje: nuo matematikos žinijos atsiradimo iki matematikos mokslo įsitvirtinimo (in Lithuanian). Vilnius: Lietuvos edukologijos universiteto leidykla. ISBN 9789955209607.
- Bitautas, Algis (2016). "Matulionis Povilas" (PDF). In Bitautas, Algis; Svarauskas, Artūras; Tamošaitis, Mindaugas (eds.). Lietuvos Respublikos 1918–1940 m. vyriausybių ministrų biografinis žodynas (in Lithuanian). Mokslo ir enciklopedijų leidybos centras. pp. 265–267. ISBN 978-5-420-01778-4.
- Bortkevičienė, Felicija (23 March 1932). "Povilą Matulionį atsiminus". Lietuvos žinios (in Lithuanian). Vol. 67, no. 3859. p. 3.
- Deltuvas, Romualdas (September 2010). "Prof. P. Matulionis – lietuviškosios miškininkystės pradininkas ir LŽŪA rektorius" (PDF). Mūsų girios. 9 (749): 11. ISSN 1392-6829. Archived from the original (PDF) on 29 June 2016.
- Deltuvas, Romualdas (January 2013a). "Povilo Matulionio karjera Rusijos miškotvarkoje" (PDF). Mūsų girios (in Lithuanian). 1 (777): 20–21. ISSN 1392-6829. Archived from the original (PDF) on 29 June 2016.
- Deltuvas, Romualdas (February 2013b). "Povilo Matulionio karjera Rusijos miškotvarkoje" (PDF). Mūsų girios (in Lithuanian). 2 (778): 16–18. ISSN 1392-6829. Archived from the original (PDF) on 29 June 2016.
- Deltuvas, Romualdas (March 2013c). "Povilo Matulionio karjera Rusijos miškotvarkoje" (PDF). Mūsų girios (in Lithuanian). 3 (779): 21–23. ISSN 1392-6829. Archived from the original (PDF) on 29 June 2016.
- Deltuvas, Romualdas (April 2013d). "Povilo Matulionio karjera Rusijos miškotvarkoje" (PDF). Mūsų girios (in Lithuanian). 4 (780): 22–23. ISSN 1392-6829. Archived from the original (PDF) on 29 June 2016.
- Deltuvas, Romualdas (13 February 2015a). "Lietuvybės gaivinimo Vilniuje pėdsakais, arba Kas yra lietuviško teatro tėvas (I)". Literatūra ir menas (in Lithuanian). 7 (3508).
- Deltuvas, Romualdas (6 February 2015b). "Lietuvybės gaivinimo Vilniuje pėdsakais, arba Kas yra lietuviško teatro tėvas (I)". Literatūra ir menas (in Lithuanian). 6 (3507).
- Deltuvas, Romualdas; Žemaitienė, Laura (13 November 2014). "Pirmasis Rektorius – profesorius Povilas Matulionis" (PDF). Mokslo Lietuva (in Lithuanian): 4–5. ISSN 1392-7191.
- Girdzijauskas, Juozas, ed. (2001). Lietuvių literatūros istorija: XIX amžius (PDF) (in Lithuanian). Vilnius: Lietuvių literatūros ir tautosakos institutas. ISBN 9986513693.
- Girkus, Romualdas; Lukoševičius, Viktoras (2005). "Lietuvos reljefas kartografiniuose dokumentuose". Geodezija ir kartografija (in Lithuanian). 4 (31): 134–140. ISSN 1392-1541.
- Girkus, Romualdas; Lukoševičius, Viktoras (2009). "Pirmasis lietuviškas Suvalkijos žemėlapis". Geodezija ir kartografija (in Lithuanian). 3 (35): 104–109. Bibcode:2009GeCar..35..104G. doi:10.3846/1392-1541.2009.35.104-109. ISSN 1392-1541. S2CID 131636902.
- Grigaravičius, Algirdas (2020). "Donatas ir Filomena Malinauskai – tautinio judėjimo veikėjai" (PDF). Voruta (in Lithuanian). 2 (868): 8–16. ISSN 1392-0677.
- Jakimavičius, Algimantas (2002). "Pirmajam lietuviškam žuvų kalendoriui – 100 metų" (PDF). Žuvininkystė Lietuvoje (in Lithuanian). 5. ISSN 1392-2475.
- Jankauskas, Vidmantas (2010). "Vienas iš "Dvylikos apaštalų": Povilas Matulionis Vilniuje (1894–1910)" (PDF). Kupiškis (in Lithuanian). 8: 35–46. ISSN 1648-942X.
- Karazija, Stasys (1988). Lietuvos miškų tipai (in Lithuanian). Vilnius: Mokslas. OCLC 21899585.
- Kauno apskrities viešoji Ąžuolyno biblioteka. "Matulionis Povilas". Žymūs Kauno žmonės: atminimo įamžinimas (in Lithuanian).
- Kupiškio viešoji biblioteka. "Povilas Matulionis". Atminties erdvės ir ženklai Kupiškio krašte (in Lithuanian).
- Keršulytė, Palmira (3 September 2015). "Povilui Matulioniui – 155" (in Lithuanian). Kupiškėnų mintys.
- "Į Steigiamąjį Seimą. Rinkimų į St. Seimą II Apygardos Komisija skelbia visų žiniai kandidatų sąrašus". Lietuva. Vol. 71, no. 353. 28 March 1920. pp. 1–2.
- Mankus, Romualdas (15 January 2024) [2018]. "Povilas Matulionis". Visuotinė lietuvių enciklopedija (in Lithuanian). Mokslo ir enciklopedijų leidybos centras.
- Mankus, Romualdas; Tebėra, Albinas (1996). "Higher Forestry Education in Lithuania: 75th Anniversary" (PDF). Baltic Forestry. 2 (2): 49–57. ISSN 1392-1355.
- Motieka, Egidijus (2005). Didysis Vilniaus Seimas (in Lithuanian). Vilnius: Lithuanian Institute of History. ISBN 9986-780-75-6.
- Nikitenka, Denisas (19 March 2023). "Profesoriaus Pauliaus Matulionio 1922 m. Kaune išleista knygutė apie gintarą" (in Lithuanian). Vakarų ekspresas.
- Šulgienė, N. (16 September 1985). "Prof. Matulioniui – 125". Tarybinis studentas (in Lithuanian). Vol. 25, no. 1324. p. 4.
- Šveistytė, Alina; Apšegaitė, Violeta; Būda, Vincas (2013). "Zoology from 1918 to 1929 in Lithuania: the Situation of Research and Studies" (PDF). Ekologija. 1 (59): 1–10. ISSN 0235-7224.
- Tamulytė-Jagminienė, Jūratė (16 November 2019). "Žinomam tarpukario Lietuvos švietėjui Augustinui Jakučioniui – 135". Bernardinai.lt (in Lithuanian).
- Tiškus, Vladas (1930). "Prof. dr. h. c. Povilas Matulionis". Mūsų girios (in Lithuanian). 5: 5–11.
- Tapinas, Laimonas; et al., eds. (1997). "Žinių nešėjas" (PDF). Žurnalistikos enciklopedija (in Lithuanian). Vilnius: Pradai. ISBN 9986-776-62-7.
- Urbanavičienė, Ilona (9 June 2022). "Lietuvos reljefo modeliui – 100 metų" (in Lithuanian). Mokslo Lietuva.
- Vairas-Račkauskas, Karolis (2016). "Lietuvių laikraštis (1904.XI.18–1906.I.6)". Bibliotheca Lituana (in Lithuanian). 1. ISSN 2424-4422.
- Vaitkus, Vladas (1930). "Mūsų miškininkystės tėvas prof. Povilas Matulionis". Mūsų girios (in Lithuanian). 5: 1–5.
- "Povilo Matulionio premija". Visuotinė lietuvių enciklopedija (in Lithuanian). Mokslo ir enciklopedijų leidybos centras. 19 February 2024.
- Zemlickas, Gediminas (7 April 2011). "Jonas Kuprionis – miškininkas iš Dievo malonės (2)" (PDF). Mokslo Lietuva (in Lithuanian). 7 (451): 6–7. ISSN 1392-7191.
