= Marija Šlapelienė =

Lithuanian publisher

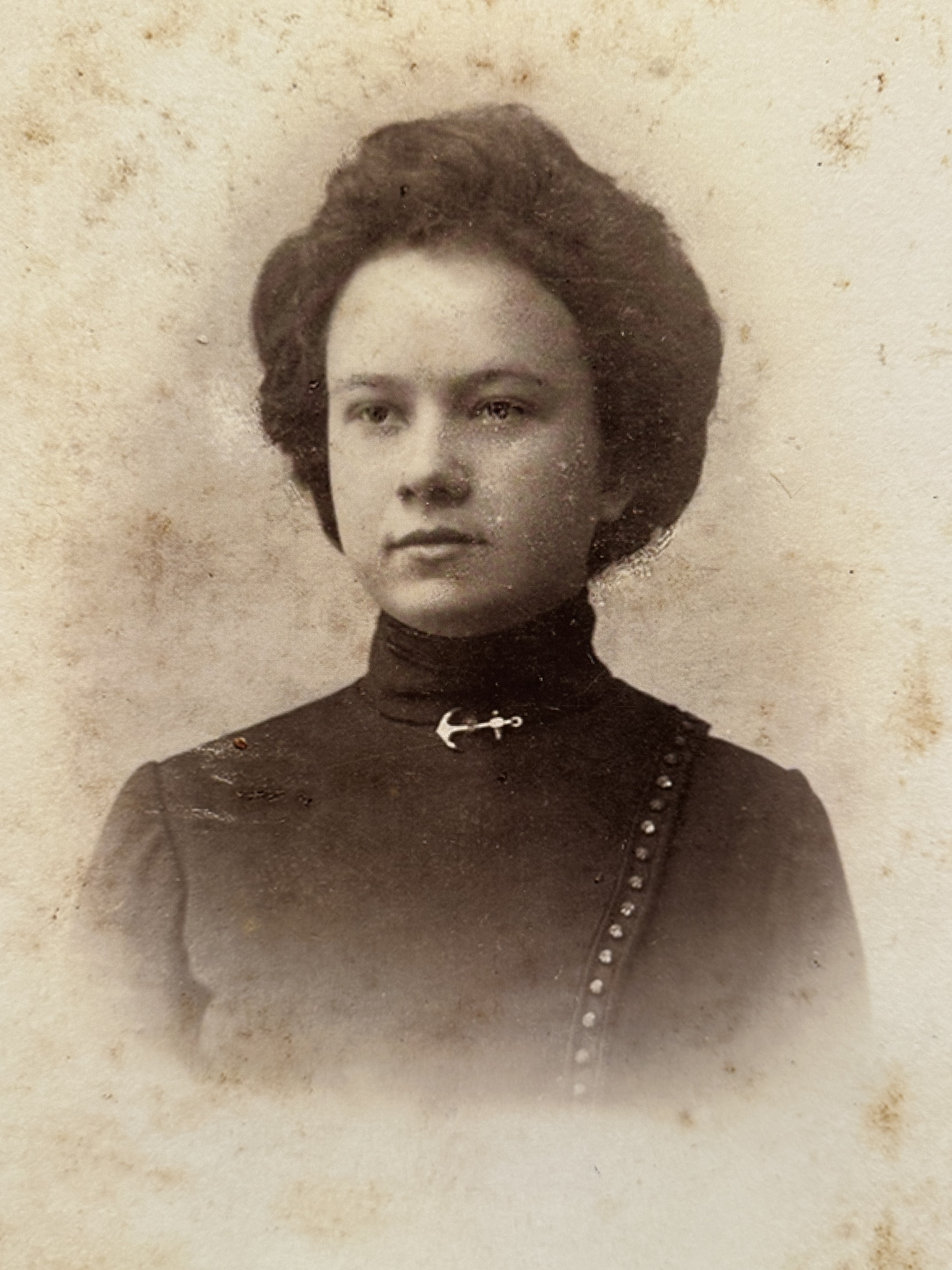
- Marija Piaseckaitė-Šlapelienė (1905)
- Born: Marija Piaseckaitė; 5 June 1880; Vilnius, Vilna Governorate, Russian Empire
- Died: 4 April 1977 (aged 96); Vilnius, Lithuania SSR
- Burial place: Rasos Cemetery
- Education: Vilnius Girls' Gymnasium
- Occupations: Publisher, actress, journalist, bookseller, Lithuanian language activist
- Organization(s): Rūta Society, Vilniaus Aušros Society
- Known for: Co-founding the first Lithuanian bookstore in Vilnius, Lithuanian language advocacy
- Spouse: Jurgis Šlapelis (1905–1941)
- Children: Laimutė Elena Šlapelytė-Graužinienė; Gražutė Marija Šlapelytė-Sirutienė; Skaistutis Šlapelis; Jurgis Šlapelis
- Memorials: Maria and Jurgis Šlapeliai House-Museum

Marija Šlapelienė née Piaseckaitė (5 June 1880 – 4 April 1977) was a Lithuanian activist, bookseller, journalist, and actress. Šlapelienė and her husband founded the first and one of the longest-running Lithuanian bookstores and were activists of the Lithuanian national revival movement.

== Biography ==
=== Early life and education ===
Born Marija Piaseckaitė on 5 June 1880, Šlapelienė grew up in Vilnius, Vilna Governorate. She was the daughter of nobles Jonas Dominykas Piaseckis and Eleonora Vojcechovska. Her father was involved in the 1863 January Uprising. Šlapelienė grew up in a Polish family and only spoke Polish at home.

Šlapelienė went to school at the Vilnius Girls' Gymnasium and graduated in 1900. She grew up going to St. Raphael Church and participated in the church choir under vicar Juozapas Ambrozevičius, an organizer of the Twelve Apostles of Vilnius.

=== Lithuanian activities ===
"Realizing that we are only bent Lithuanians –, I decided to be Lithuanian and began to diligently learn the Lithuanian language," Šlapelienė later wrote. She became friends with other leaders in Lithuanian national revival movement: Lithuanian activist brothers Petras, Antanas and Jonas Vileišiai, linguist Jonas Jablonskis, writer Žemaitė, and politicians Jurgis Šaulys and Povilas Višinskis.

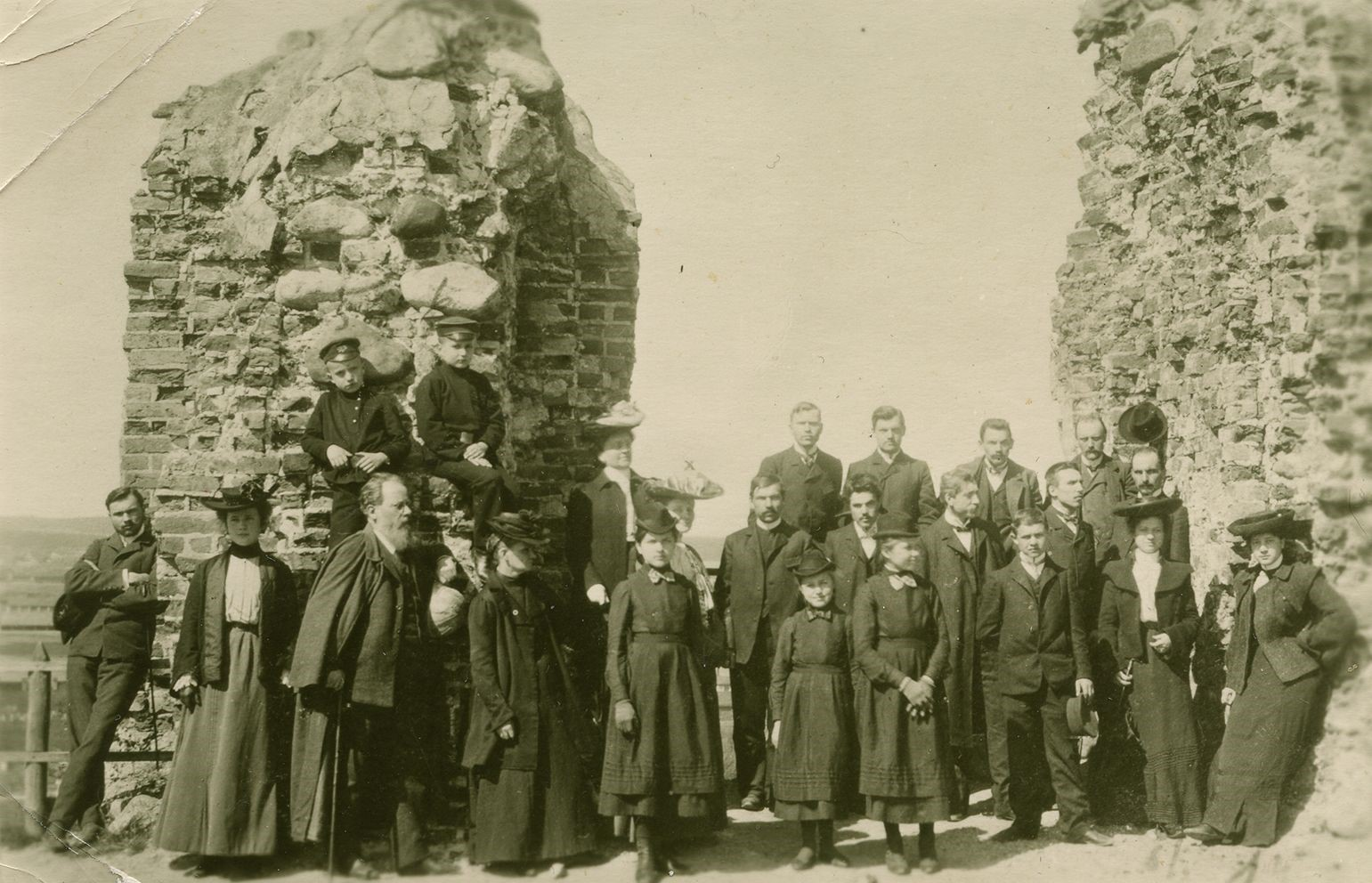
Staff of Vilniaus žinios at Gediminas Castle (1905)

Šlapelienė began writing for and distributing the illegal Lithuanian-language newspaper Naujienos. Publications featuring the Lithuanian language were banned from 1865 to 1904 under the Lithuanian press ban.

She later explained "I got acquainted with Lithuanian literature published abroad, I learned how it is transported, distributed, what are the difficulties and sacrifices. ... I decided to contribute to the work of those battles –. I received parcels with prohibited Lithuanian literature by mail. I hid. Then... it was distributed."

In 1904, Šlapelienė joined the Vileišiai brothers working at the editorial office and bookstore for Vilniaus žinios, the first Lithuanian-language daily newspaper. She worked there until 1906.

On 17 September 1905, Šlapelienė married doctor, political activist, and linguist Jurgis Šlapelis. She had met Šlapelis via a friend, writer and activist Gabrielė Petkevičaitė-Bitė. Šlapeliai (Lithuanian name for Šlapelienė and Šlapelis) had four children together: Laimutė Elena Šlapelytė-Graužinienė (1906–1988), Gražutė Marija Šlapelytė-Sirutienė (1909–2009), Skaistutis Šlapelis (1919–1961), and Jurgis Šlapelis (1914–1915).

Šlapelienė also performed in operas and comedies – including the leading role in Mikas Petrauskas's Birutė, the first Lithuanian opera. She joined the Vilnius Aušra and the Rūta Societies and the choir of Kanklės of Vilnius Society.

=== Bookstore ===
In 1906, Šlapeliai and Elena Brazaitytė founded the first professional Lithuanian bookstore in Pociej Palace (now 11 Dominikonų St.). After its founding, the sign for the bookstore was one of four Lithuanian language signs in the whole of Vilnius. The bookstore often held community events. The bookstore was also a Lithuanian-language publishing house – publishing works by acclaimed authors including Kristijonas Donelaitis, Šatrijos Ragana, Gabrielius Landsbergis-Žemkalnis, Jonas Basanavičius, and more. They also published the books of the Lithuanian Scientific Society. Šlapeliai and Brazaitytė added a loan bookstore in 1907. By 1913, the bookstore was selling 2400+ books.

In May 1914, the Russian Empire investigated the bookstore and summoned Šlapeliai to court for selling "anti-state content." According to Šlapelienė, there was a "threat of confiscation and deportation of all property in Siberia, and maybe hard labor." Under Ober Ost occupation during World War I, the Germans investigated the bookstore and Šlapelienė was temporarily in Lukiškės Prison. Šlapeliai would sneak Lithuanian books past governmental censorship by bringing them in through Germany and Latvia.

After independence of Lithuania, Šlapeliai and their children moved to a two-story house at 40 Pilies St. (now a museum) in 1926.

The houses of Marija and Jurgis Šlapeliai on Pilies Street were one of the most significant foci of Lithuanian culture 20th century beginning in Vilnius. A century ago, an intense cultural life boiled here: it was in these rooms that Lithuanian Vilnius was created, national self-awareness matured and many ideas were born, which later determined the path of Lithuania's independence. Marija and Jurgis Šlapeliai were not only the owners of the bookstore. They were people who opened the door to their homes for everyone who wanted to create a Lithuanian Vilnius. Their living space turned into a center of culture and resistance –, a place where discussions took place, new ideas were born, and bold decisions were made.

— Marija and Jurgis Šlapeliai House-Museum

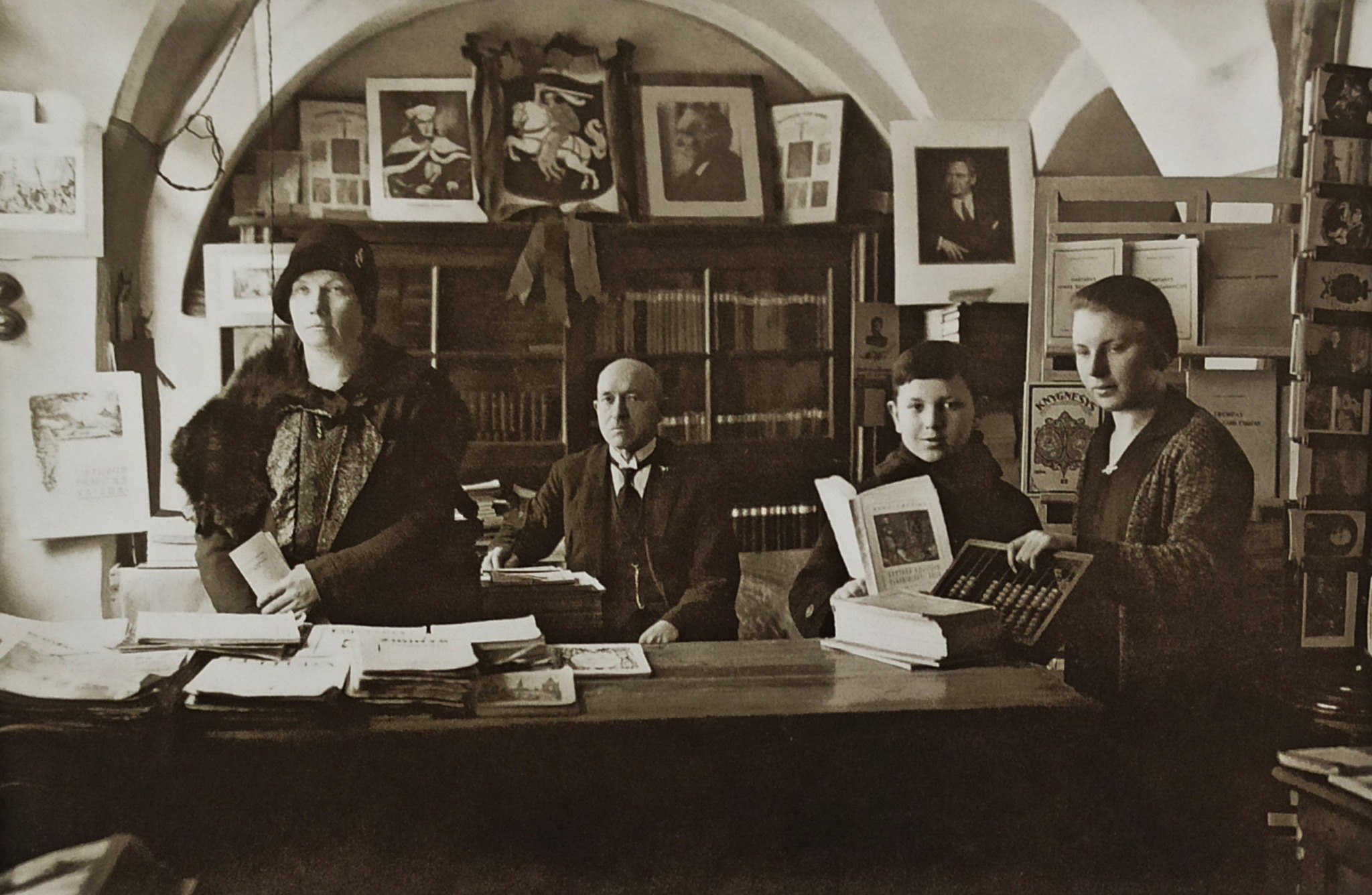
Marija, Jurgis, and Skaistutis Šlapeliai and Adelė Klišytė celebrating 25th anniversary of Šlapeliai bookstore (19 February 1931)

During the Polish occupation of Vilnius and Ludwik Bociański's forcible Polish assimilation policies from 1935–1939, the bookstore reduced the amount of books to around 75. In 1938, Šlapeliene was charged by Polish authorities for distributing Lithuanian books and maps; she was detained for three days. Šlapeliai had different entrances for international and Lithuanian books in an effort to hide Lithuanian literature from the Polish authorities during their multiple searches and investigations of the bookstore. After finally finding the hidden literature after multiple searches, authorities briefly closed the bookstore that year and took away some of the more expensive books.

=== World War II and after ===
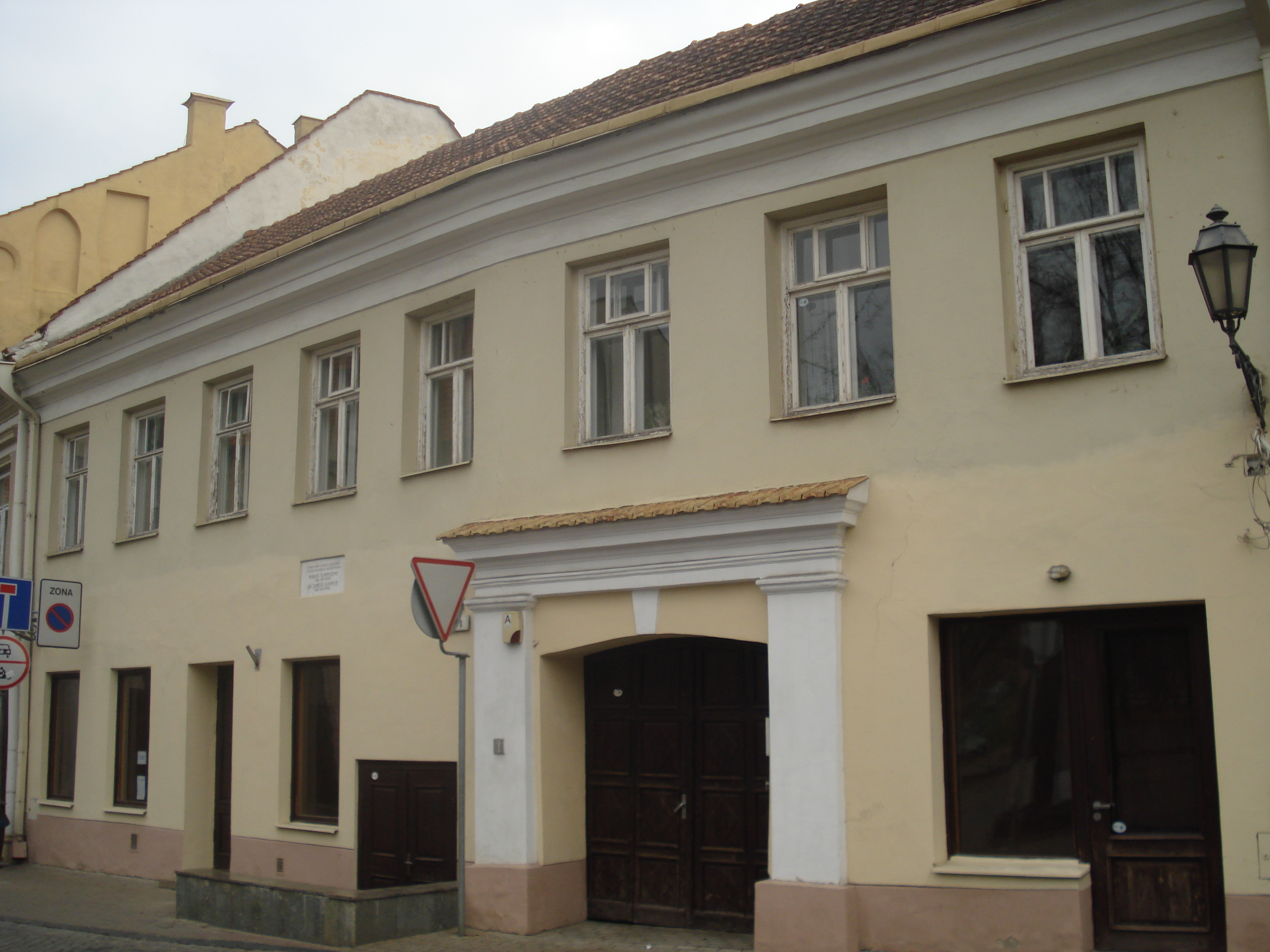
Marija and Jurgis Šlapeliai House-Museum in Vilnius

Later prioritizing stationary, bookstore would go to also survive the Occupation of Lithuania by Nazi Germany and the Soviet occupations of 1940 and 1944.

Šlapelis passed away in 1941.

In 1945, the SSR ordered the closing of the bookstore. Some books were saved in other locations while others disappeared.

In 1956, the Lithuanian National Opera celebrated Šlapelienė and her performance in Birutė during their golden anniversary.

After the closing of her bookstore, Šlapelienė continued to live on Pilies St. with her maid, Apolonia Keperšaitė (? - 1991). Her children all moved abroad. Šlapelienė and Keperšaitė were pushed into two of the rooms in the house and strangers moved into the other rooms. Šlapelienė kept 5000 to 6000 books in their small apartment.

She would later write a memoir about her life. She passed away in 1977.

== Selected performances ==
- Amerika pirtyje (1905)
- Kaminkrėtys ir malūnininkas
- Pilėnų kunigaikštis
- Birutė (1906)

== Legacy ==
After being donated to the city of Vilnius by Gražutė Šlapelytė-Sirutienė in 1991, Šlapeliai's home was turned into the Maria and Jurgis Šlapeliai House-Museum. Šlapelienė lived from 1926 until her death, even after it was nationalized and her children moved abroad. Alma Gudonytė, the niece of Šlapeliai, became the first museum director. Memorial plaques for Šlapeliai were later added inside the house-museum's courtyard (about 1994) and Dominikonų street (2004).

Acclaimed international artists have since held temporary exhibitions at the museum, including Derek Michael Besant and Alexandra Haeseker.

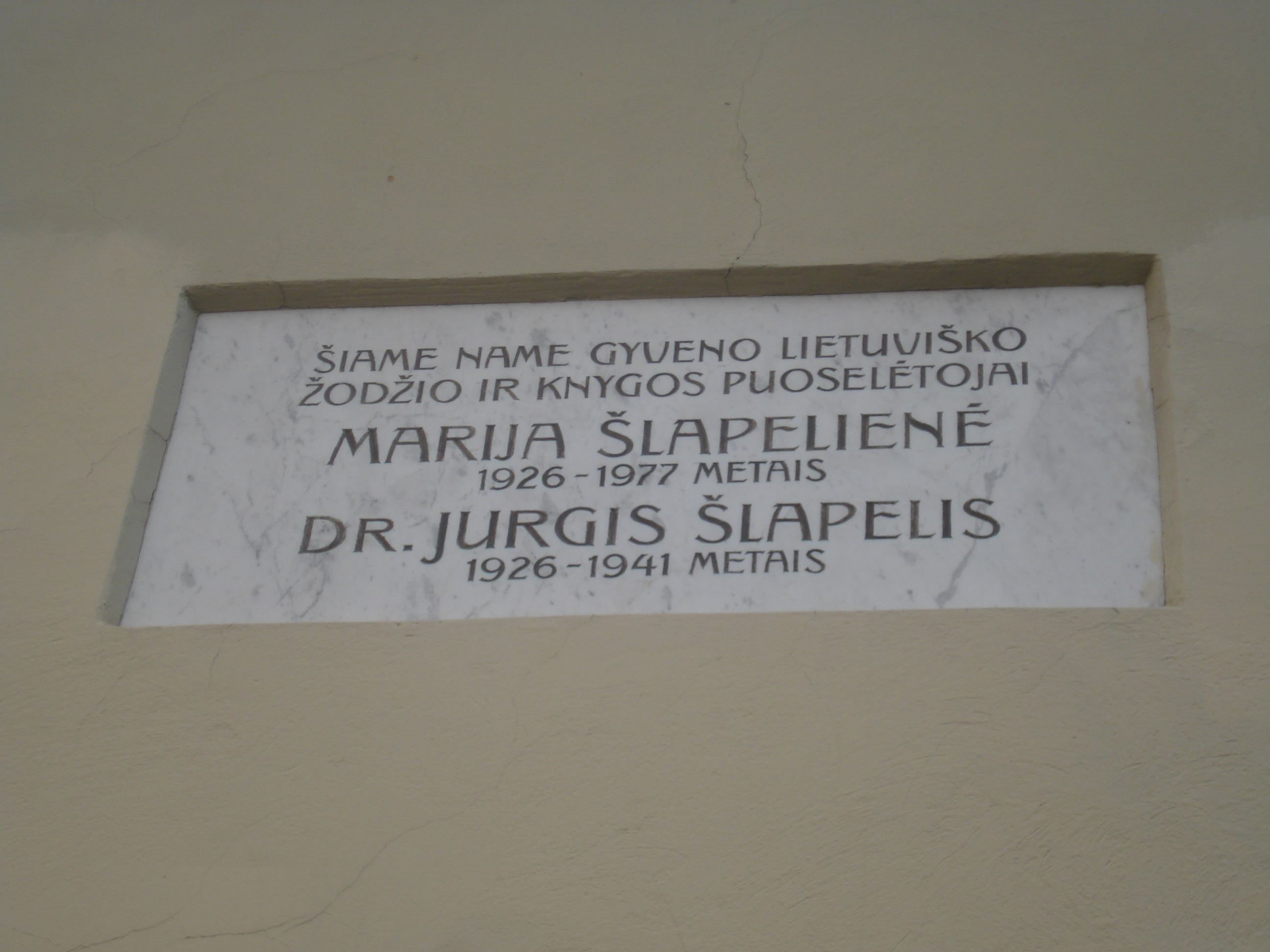
Memorial plaque of Marija Šlapeliene and Jurgis Šlapelis

In 2003, Juozas Matonis and Vytautas Domasevičius made a documentary about the couple called Ištikimi lietuviškajam žodžiui: Marija ir Jurgis Šlapeliai [trans. Loyal to the Lithuanian word. Jurgis and Marija Šlapeliai]. The duo made another documentary about Šlapeliai in 2006 called M. ir J. Šlapelių knygynui – 100 metų [trans. M. and J. Šlapeliai bookstore – 100 years].

In 2020, to celebrate Šlapelienė's 140th birthday, a Salve festival was held by the Maria and Jurgis Šlapeliai House-Museum.

In 2026, Wroblewski Library of the Lithuanian Academy of Sciences organized a virtual exhibition to commemorate the 120th anniversary of Šlapeliai's bookstore and Šlapelienė's starring role in Birutė.
