= Great Seimas of Vilnius =

1905 national assembly held in Lithuania

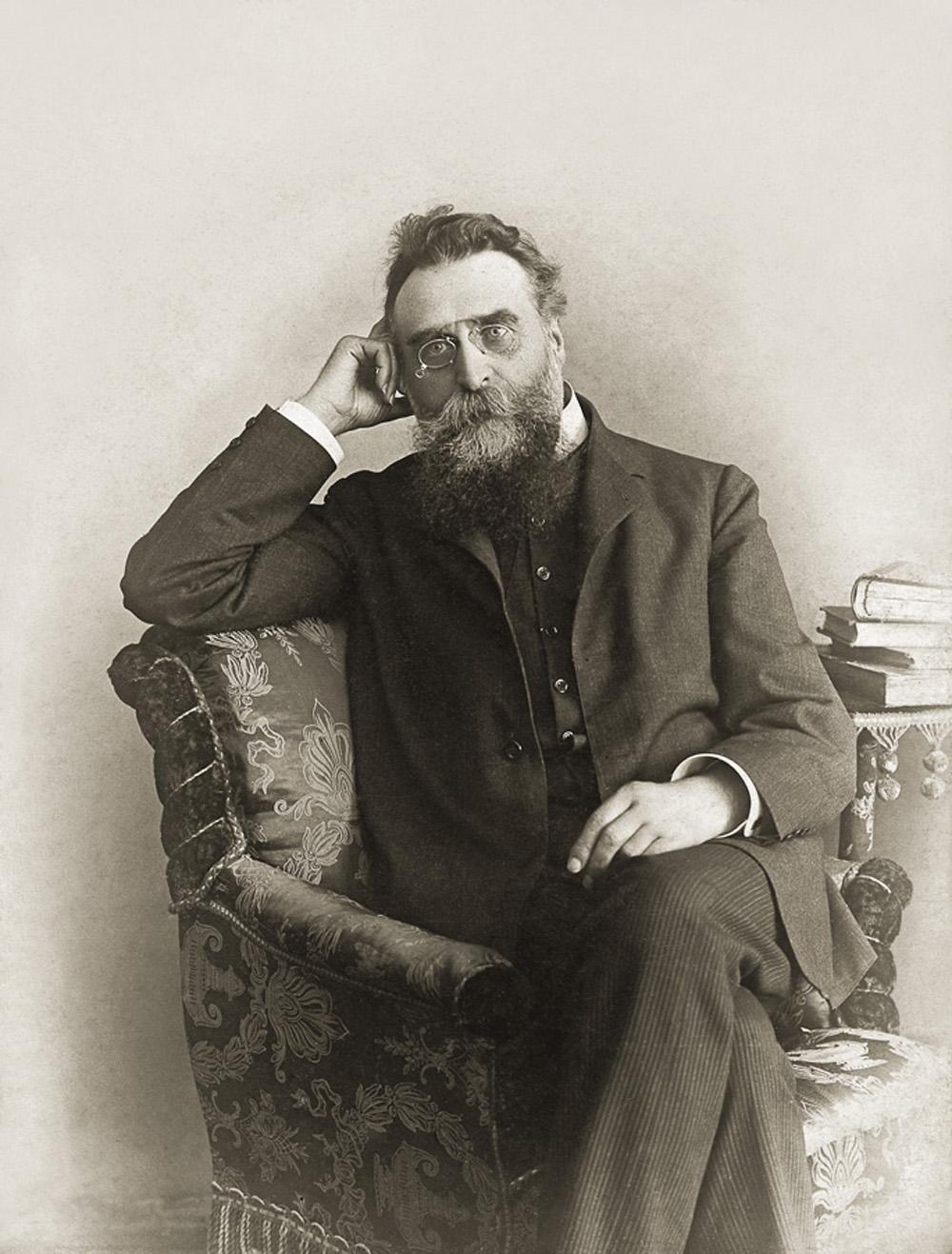
Portrait of Jonas Basanavičius, chairman of the Seimas.

The Great Seimas of Vilnius (Lithuanian: Didysis Vilniaus Seimas), also known as the Great Assembly of Vilnius or the Great Diet of Vilnius, was a major assembly held on December 4 and 5, 1905, (Note: November 21 and 22, 1905 O.S.) in Vilnius, Lithuania—then part of the Russian Empire. Largely inspired by the Russian Revolution of 1905, it was the first modern national congress in Lithuania and dealt primarily not with the social issues that sparked the revolution, but with national concerns. Over 2,000 participants took part in the Seimas. The assembly made the decision to demand wide political autonomy within the Russian Empire and achieve this by peaceful means. It is considered an important step towards the Act of Independence of Lithuania, adopted on February 16, 1918, by the Council of Lithuania, as the Seimas laid the groundwork for the establishment of an independent Lithuanian state.

== Historical background ==
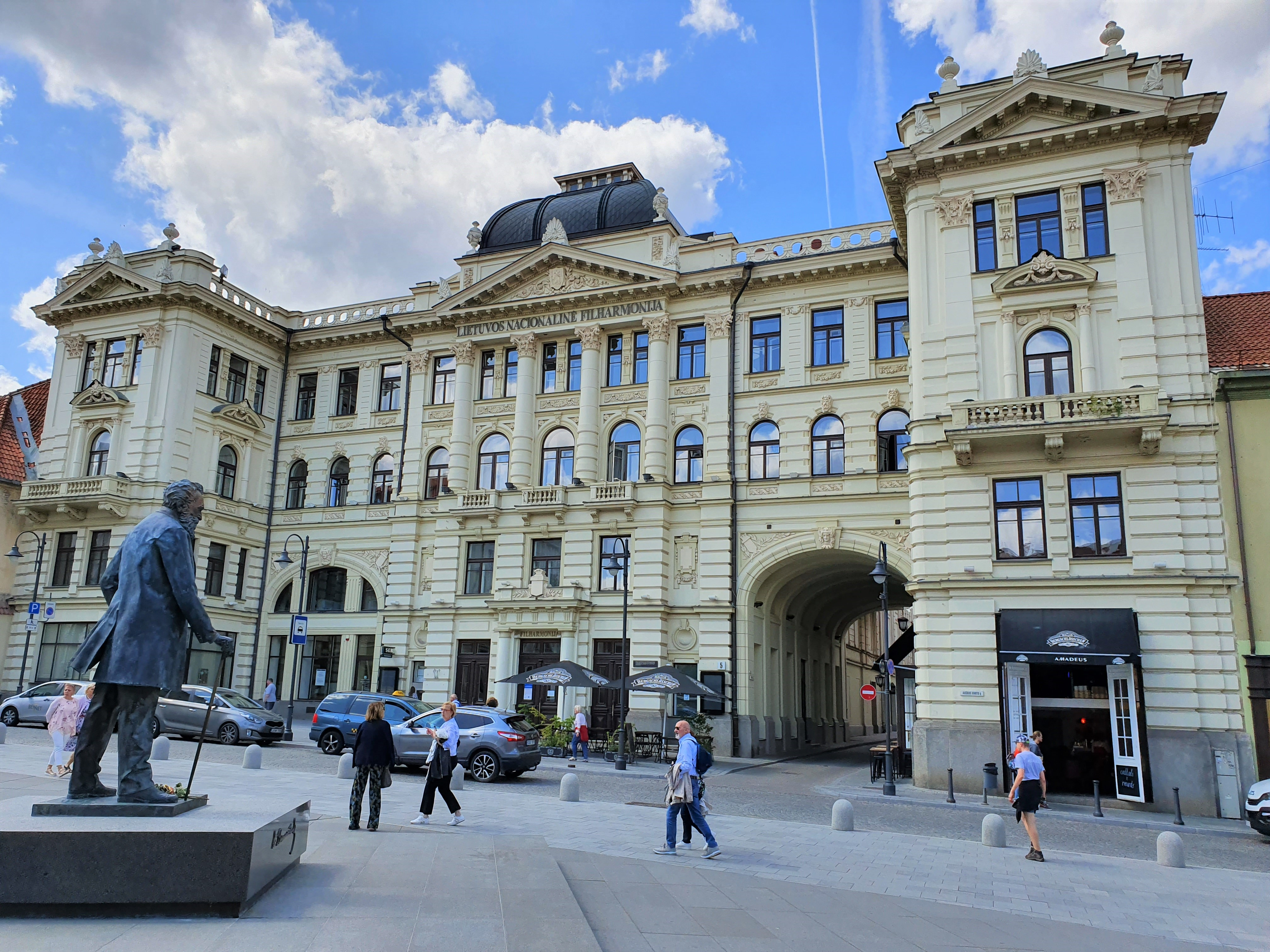
The building where the Seimas took place. It currently houses the National Philharmonic Society of Lithuania.

Lithuania had been part of the Russian Empire since the partitions of the Polish–Lithuanian Commonwealth in the late 18th century. After the unsuccessful uprising of 1863, Lithuania was subjected to Russification policies: the Lithuanian press ban was initiated, schools were required to teach in the Russian language, Roman Catholics could not hold positions in government institutions and could own only limited amounts of land, and political rights were restricted. However, these measures did not stop the Lithuanian National Revival, and a sense of the Lithuanian national identity continued to grow. The first Lithuanian political parties, the Social Democratic Party of Lithuania and Lithuanian Democratic Party, included goals of political autonomy for Lithuania within the Russian Empire in their basic program.

After the events of Bloody Sunday in January 1905 sparked a revolution in Russia, Tsar Nicholas II was forced to make concessions. In April 1905 a decree guaranteed complete freedom of religion, and even allowed religious studies to be conducted in native languages. The most important decree, the October Manifesto, was announced on October 30 (October 17 O.S.), 1905. It guaranteed many political rights, including the right to form political parties and organize convocations. This decree formed the legal basis for the assembly in Vilnius. The October Manifesto also announced the intent to hold elections to the Russian Parliament (Duma), and the Lithuanian organizers used this as an official pretext for the Seimas: they claimed that the Lithuanians needed to prepare themselves for this election.

== Preparations ==
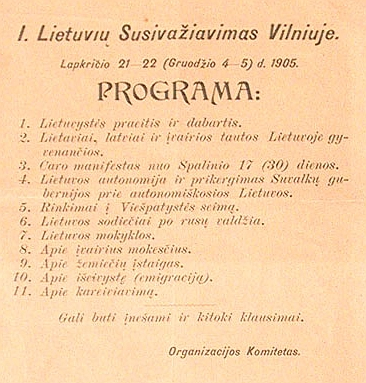
A flyer with an agenda, prepared by the organizational committee. This agenda was vetoed by the delegates.

Historians disagree about who initiated the idea of organizing a national assembly. Some credit Jonas Basanavičius, while others argue for Jonas Kriaučiūnas. The organizational activities were largely taken on by the Lithuanian Christian Democrats and by Vilniaus žinios, a moderate newspaper owned by Petras Vileišis. Vilniaus žinios was the first legal Lithuanian-language daily newspaper to appear after the Lithuanian press ban was lifted on May 7, 1904; it was quite popular and its circulation soon reached 6,000 copies. On October 31 (October 18 O.S.), 1905 a fifteen-member organizational committee, chairman Jonas Basanavičius and secretary Jonas Kriaučiūnas, (Note: The fifteen members were in alphabetical order: Juozapas Ambraziejus, Jonas Baronas, Jonas Basanavičius, Felicija Bortkevičienė, Mečislovas Davainis-Silvestraitis, Andrius Domaševičius, Pranas Jokūbėnas, Jonas Kriaučiūnas, Gabrielius Landsbergis-Žemkalnis, Ona or Genovaitė Sapkauskaitė, Vladas Sirutavičius, Stasys Stakelė, Valentinas Urbonavičius, Antanas Vileišis, Povilas Višinskis. Socialdemocrats Domaševičius and Sirutavičius quickly withdrew from the committee and were replaced by Juozas Kukta and Petras Vileišis.) was given the task of convening the assembly. They published an appeal or a manifest to the Lithuanian people on November 11 (October 29 O.S.) in Vilniaus žinios. The appeal, signed by the chairman and the secretary, aroused much interest in the public. Invitations were extended to all persons who would be elected as representatives by their communities at volosts, and to all other educated people interested in the future of the Lithuanian state. At the end of the appeal there was an eight-point agenda to be discussed at the Seimas. It did not include the question of Lithuanian autonomy.

On November 15 (November 2 O.S.), a controversial memorandum was adopted by the organizational committee and sent to Sergei Witte, Prime Minister of the Russian Empire. It was signed by only four people: Jonas Basanavičius, who was the primary author, Donatas Malinauskas, Juozapas Ambraziejus, and Mečislovas Davainis-Silvestraitis. It consisted of an introduction, which briefly summarized the history of Lithuania, and ten points of demands and declarations. The first point was the most controversial: it declared that Kovno, Grodno, Vilna, Suwałki Governorates and parts of Courland Governorate were historically Lithuanian and that the Poles, Jews, Russians, and other groups in those areas were merely invaders, who had arrived in the recent past. Belarusians were called "Slavicized Lithuanians". The last point in the memorandum, asking that the title of Grand Duke of Lithuania not be disregarded in the Tsar's documents, also drew criticism. Other points demanded Lithuanian autonomy, equal rights to all nationalities and social classes, full political and religious freedom, free universal education in the Lithuanian language, the introduction of the Lithuanian language to government institutions, and the attachment of the Suwałki Governorate not to Poland but to autonomous Lithuania. Many of these demands were echoed by the Seimas.

Those parts of the memorandum that demanded Lithuanian autonomy and protested the possible attachment of Suwałki Governorate to an autonomous Poland were reprinted in the Russian publication Pravitelstvennyi Vestnik on November 23 (November 10 O.S.). The Russian government sought to demonstrate that granting autonomy to both Poland and Lithuania would be complicated, and would probably exacerbate national conflicts. On November 26 (November 13 O.S.) the memorandum was also reprinted in Vilniaus žinios. It was heavily criticized by non-Lithuanians for its position on minorities and by Lithuanians for making demands on behalf of the Lithuanian nation without waiting for the Seimas' resolutions.

On December 4 (November 21 O.S.), about 2,000 people arrived in Vilnius; half of them were officially elected as delegates by their local communities. Because no standard elections procedures were offered, the process of selecting the representatives varied greatly. Despite irregularities, it was the first election in the history of Lithuania. People from Aukštaitija were most active, while participation from Samogitia and Suvalkija was somewhat lower. Some of the delegates came from areas that are now part of Poland and Latvia, as well as from areas that were then within the lands of the German Empire (Lithuania Minor). As a result, a wide variety of communities, political groups, government layers, social classes, and organizations were represented. This parliament may have been the first in Europe to include women—there were seven female delegates.

== The Seimas ==
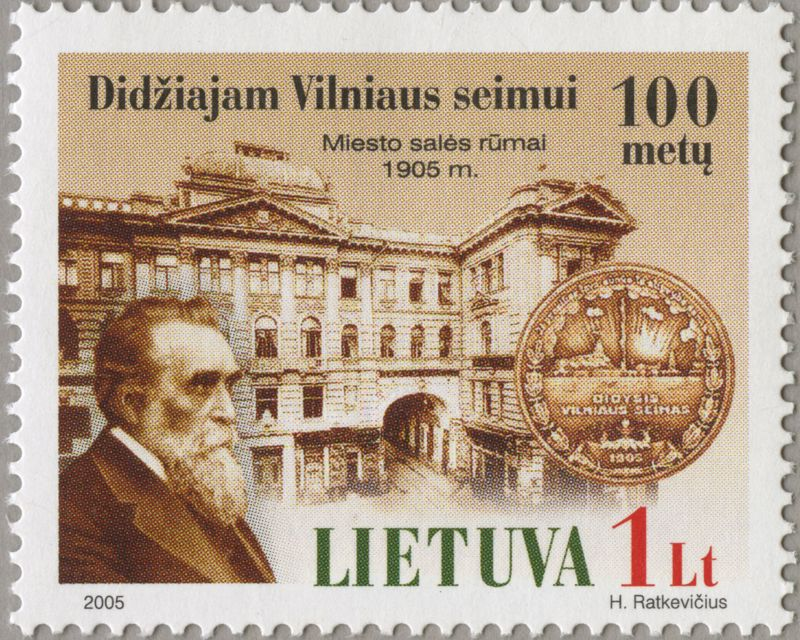
Lithuanian postage stamp dedicated to the 100th anniversary of the Great Seimas of Vilnius, 2005

It took two hours of intense discussion to elect the presidium of the Seimas. Jonas Basanavičius, officially nonpartisan, was elected as the chairman and Steponas Kairys, leader of the Social Democrats, was chosen as vice-chairman. Other members were Antanas Smetona, priest Pranciškus Būčys, and Juozas Stankūnas; the secretaries were Liudas Gira, Pranas Klimaitis, and Juozas Gabrys-Paršaitis. The organizational committee proposed a rather academic agenda geared toward cultural issues for the assembly; this initial agenda was vetoed by the delegates. They adopted a new schedule that was more political and highlighted two main goals: holding hearings on the current situation in Lithuania, and deciding which political demands should be submitted to the Tsarist authorities. A major portion of the first day's proceedings was devoted to reports presented by delegates from rural areas. The content of these reports was repetitious and did not carry much weight. The most important question was that of Lithuanian autonomy.

There were rumors that some Russian politicians were seriously considering granting autonomy to Poland, and that Polish activists wished to incorporate Lithuanian lands into their autonomous region, calling on the historic tradition of the Polish–Lithuanian Commonwealth. In light of these rumors, the demands of the delegates were much more radical than were expected. Most demanded autonomy in ethnographic Lithuanian lands along with any border areas that would decide to join. The region would be governed by a democratically elected Seimas in Vilnius and bound by federal ties with neighboring lands. The "ethnographic Lithuanian lands" at issue were not clearly defined, but resistance to tsarist authorities was to be organized in Kovno, Grodno, and Vilna Governorates; special attention was given to Suwałki Governorate. The Seimas' resolution, adopted on the second day, explicitly stated that Lithuanians from Suwałki Governorate had decided to join the fight for autonomous Lithuania. This was largely an attempt to prevent the potential Polish autonomous region from claiming Suwałki, then part of Congress Poland, for itself. The election to Seimas was to be universal, equal, direct and secret; all persons were to be granted suffrage without regard to sex, religion, or nationality. If the election had taken place, it would have been the first in Europe where women were granted an equal right to vote.

This demand was far-reaching and required transformation of the empire into a federal state, placing Lithuania on a par with the Grand Duchy of Finland within the Russian constitutional system. Heated discussions continued on the means to achieve this transformation. Some argued for armed resistance, but were reminded that the previous uprisings in 1831 and 1863 had failed. Others suggested peaceful and passive resistance: refusing to pay taxes, boycotting products from monopolistic companies (mostly those selling alcoholic beverages), not allowing children to attend Russian schools, evading drafts into the Imperial Russian army, and organizing factory worker strikes. The delegates, who were mostly small farmers, also discussed land reform, demanding that all land would be confiscated from large landlords and distributed to those who actually cultivated it. However, no conclusions in that area were reached as there was a perception that any resolution on land reform would encourage the peasants to rise against their landlords as it was happening in other parts of the Russian Empire.

At the end of the second day, the Seimas adopted a four-paragraph resolution. The first paragraph declared that the Tsarist government was Lithuania's most dangerous enemy. The second paragraph demanded autonomy; the third outlined the means towards this goal that were deemed acceptable. The resistance was to be peaceful and passive. The fourth and final paragraph demanded that children be taught in their native language by teachers chosen by the people. The Seimas, unlike the 1917 Vilnius Conference, did not attempt to elect an institution that could carry out these resolutions and act as a Lithuanian government. After the Seimas, rural areas were left on their own without central guidance. After the resolution was adopted by the Seimas, near midnight, Jonas Basanavičius read aloud his proposal to include an attachment condemning Polish ecclesiastical authorities for Polonization via the suppression of the use of the Lithuanian language in the Vilnius diocese's churches. The church matters had not been discussed during the sessions, but the majority agreed to the proposal by a show of hands. Because the attachment was not fully discussed, Social Democrats did not consider it officially adopted.

== Aftermath ==
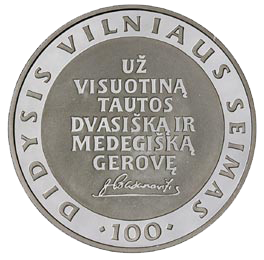
Litas commemorative coin dedicated to the 100th Anniversary of the Great Seimas of Vilnius.

During the night from December 5 to December 6, Petras Vileišis printed 36,000 copies of the resolution for distribution. After the assembly, notorious for its loud, lengthy and intense debates, the delegates returned to their communities and started to carry out its resolutions. The old Russian administrations were replaced in 125 out of the 280 volosts (82 in Kaunas, 33 in Suvalkai, and 10 in Vilnius Governorates). These communities elected their own representatives, organized their own schools where classes were taught in the Lithuanian language, and stopped paying taxes. While the first Russian responses were disorganized and confused, the authorities soon marshaled their armed forces and returned the situation back to normal. The process was relatively peaceful; there were only a few clashes between armed groups of peasants and Tsarist military forces. Unlike in neighboring Latvia or Estonia, peasants did not rise against their landlords. A number of the most prominent activists of this movement were arrested and sent to Siberia.

The Lithuanian Democratic Party and Ernestas Galvanauskas used the Seimas as an opportunity to organize the Peasant Union, which largely represented the interests of large and mid-size farmers. The Union helped spread the influence of the Seimas into the countryside. A few days after the Seimas, Jonas Basanavičius founded the Lithuanian National Democratic Party (Lithuanian: Tautiškoji lietuvių demokratų partija), the first nationalistic party in Lithuania.

The plan for autonomy was not accomplished at this time, but the Seimas was an important development in the Lithuanian bid for independence. It consolidated efforts, spearheaded the organization of political parties, strengthened national conscience, and energized the rural populace. The assembly resolutely rejected ideas to restore the old Grand Duchy of Lithuania and for the first time voiced the demands for autonomy. Many of the political and religious rights that were granted by the October Manifesto were retained. A number of agricultural, educational, scientific, literary and artistic societies emerged.
