= Emilija Vileišienė =

Lithuanian activist

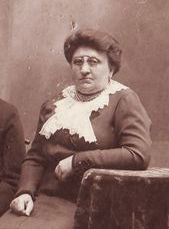
- Vileišienė in 1914
- Born: Emilija Jasmantaitė; 13 January 1861; Chișinău, Bessarabia Governorate, Russian Empire
- Died: 26 August 1935 (aged 74); Vilnius (Wilno), Second Polish Republic
- Resting place: Rasos Cemetery
- Education: Smolny Institute
- Board member of: Society of Saint Zita; Lithuanian Catholic Women's Organization; Lithuanian Society for the Relief of War Sufferers
- Spouse: Antanas Vileišis

Emilija Vileišienė née Jasmantaitė (1861–1935) was a Lithuanian activist. Born to a noble family, she attended the Smolny Institute and lived with her older brother in Saint Petersburg and Caucasus. When her brother became severely ill, they moved to Vilnius (Wilno, Vilna) where Vileišienė met her husband Antanas Vileišis and became active in Lithuanian cultural life. She was an active member of various Lithuanian organizations, including the Lithuanian Mutual Relief Society of Vilnius, Society of Saint Zita for servants, and the cultural Rūta Society. During World War I, she was a board member of the Lithuanian Society for the Relief of War Sufferers and was particularly active in organizing relief for war refugees. After the war, she remained in Vilnius and continued active public life despite several arrests by the Polish government. In 1928–1930, she toured numerous Lithuanian American communities collecting donations for the orphans and the poor.

== Biography ==
=== Early life and activities ===
Vileišienė was born in 1861 in Chișinău where her father was stationed with the Russian Imperial Army. Her parents were members of the Lithuanian nobility from Samogitia. In 1870, she was sent to the Smolny Institute for noble girls to obtain an education. The education lasted 12 years and covered a wide range of subjects, from physics and geography to dance and polite behavior. Her brother Jonas Jasmantas (1849–1906) studied at the Saint Petersburg University and after graduation obtained a job at the Ministry of Finance of the Russian Empire. After the death of her parents in 1875, Vileišienė lived with her brother and joined Lithuanian cultural life in Saint Petersburg. She followed her brother to Caucasus where Jasmantas was posted as a financial inspector for seven years. They returned to Saint Petersburg, but Jasmantas became seriously ill in 1894. Vileišienė spent her time caring for her brother who traveled to Pyatigorsk for treatments.

In 1897, Vileišienė and her brother settled in Vilnius and joined the informal group Twelve Apostles of Vilnius. There she met doctor Antanas Vileišis and they married on 6 October 1900 at the Church of St. Peter and St. Paul. Vileišienė cared for her paralyzed brother and for her husband's nephews and nieces. Together with her husband, she participated in Lithuanian cultural life: petitioned for Lithuanian-language services at the Church of St. Nicholas, supported the Lithuanian Mutual Relief Society of Vilnius which was chaired by her husband, organized a student group that later became a chapter of Aušrininkai, and became a member of the Lithuanian Scientific Society. She also actively participated in musical and theater performances of the Rūta Society and became one of the founders of the Society of Saint Zita for Lithuanian female servants. Some of the first Lithuanian theater performances took place in Vileišis' apartment. In August 1907, the Mutual Relief Society opened the first Lithuanian-language school in Vilnius. Vileišienė actively helped to organize the school, obtain funding and supplies, and provide aid to students in need. In 1913, she was elected to the board of the Vilnius chapter of the Lithuanian Catholic Women's Organization.

=== World War I and after ===
When World War I started in August 1914, Vileišienė was one of the founders of the Lithuanian Committee of Vilnius, the first Lithuanian organization that provided aid to war refugees. The committee was absorbed by the Lithuanian Society for the Relief of War Sufferers and she was elected to its board. She toured various cities and towns in Lithuania collecting donations, establishing local chapters, and organizing new shelters. In May 1915, she attended a meeting of the Tatiana Committee during which she was introduced to Empress Alexandra Feodorovna. When Vilnius was occupied by the Germans, General Alexei von Pfeil issued a proclamation that depicted Vilnius as a "pearl" of Poland. Vileišienė, together with Jonas Basanavičius and Jonas Kymantas, visited von Pfeil to protest the proclamation and explain that Vilnius was the capital of the Grand Duchy of Lithuania, not of Poland.

In October 1915, Jonas Basanavičius, Mykolas Biržiška, and Povilas Gaidelionis opened a Lithuanian-language gymnasium in Vilnius (later Vytautas the Great Gymnasium). Vileišienė organized a student dormitory near the Gate of Dawn. Vileišienė and other activists, including Basanavičius and Gaidelionis, were briefly arrested by the Ober Ost officials in July 1916. Her husband died of epidemic typhus in April 1919 – she dressed in black for the rest of her life. As she needed to find means to support herself, Vileišienė became the supervisor of the student dormitory and moved in to live with the students. She was strict and demanding and thus there were frequent conflicts between her and the students. After one such conflicts, she resigned from the dormitory in July 1924.

After the Great War, Vilnius frequently changed hands during the Polish–Soviet War and the Polish–Lithuanian War but eventually became part of the Second Polish Republic. The Polish government restricted Lithuanian activities, often arresting and imprisoning Lithuanian activists. Vileišienė was arrested several times. For example, she was arrested in 1919 for protesting against Polish plans to exhume the bodies of Lithuanian soldiers and she was imprisoned for one month in November 1922 because the school dormitory did not have a proper sidewalk. In September 1928, Vileišienė set out on a 22-month trip to United States to collect donations for orphans and others in need. After her return, she received a pension and was able to retire. She died on 26 August 1935 after suffering a heart attack in January during mass at the Church of St. Nicholas. Her funeral was attended by many Lithuanian activists and she was buried in Rasos Cemetery.
