= Vilnius Girls' Gymnasium =

Coordinates: 54°41′19″N 25°16′11″E

Vilnius Girls' Gymnasium was a secondary education institution for girls in Vilnius while it was part of the Russian Empire. It was established in 1860 with the funding from the Office of the Institutions of Empress Maria and was viewed as a tool of Russification by the officials. Therefore, it was not popular and there were only 58 students in 1862. Officials considered reorganizing it into a three-year school. However, gradually the number of students increased and reached 831 in 1912. Most of the students were daughters of the nobility. The school was evacuated to Russia during World War I.

== History ==
=== Establishment and first decade ===
Gymnasium students by religion and social status
Year	Total	Religion				Social status		
Year	Total	Catholics	Eastern Orthodox	Protestants	Jews	Nobles	City residents^{1}	Peasants
1874	445	120	137	16	172	239	201	5
1883	459	124	134	18	183	245	208	6
1893	406	102	129	24	151	215	185	6
1903	455	118	218	11	108	276	158	21
1907	519	133	248	27	111	315	185	19
1909	782	326	329	22	105	471	290	21
1912	831	392	329	25	85	491	310	30
^{1} Note that most Jews were city residents.

In 1858, the Ministry of National Education started working on statutes that would allow establishing girls' secondary schools in the Russian Empire. Establishment of the gymnasiums was also sponsored by the Office of the Institutions of Empress Maria and the first school opened in April 1858 in Saint Petersburg. As a result of these developments, Vladimir Nazimov, the Vilna Governor-General, started working on establishing girls' schools in the Governorate-General. However, he could not get local nobles and city residents agree to provide financial support to the proposed gymnasiums. The Office of the Institutions of Empress Maria agreed to finance schools in Vilnius, Kaunas, and Grodno and provide each with 3,000 Russian rubles. The schools were opened on 1 January 1860. Initially, Jewish girls were prohibited from attending the school, but this restriction was cancelled in October 1861. The first teachers were from the Institutes for Nobles and the curriculum was taken from district schools.

The school taught in Russian and thus were not very popular. Despite some concessions (e.g. girls had twice the number of weekly Polish lessons than boys and their governess was a Roman Catholic and not Eastern Orthodox), the school in Vilnius had only 89 students in 1860 and 58 in 1862. Due to disappointing number of students, the Office of the Institutions of Empress Maria wanted to reorganize the gymnasiums into three-year schools. However, Nazimov convinced the authorities to keep them open as they were the only girls' schools that provided Russian education and thus facilitated Russification efforts. After the Uprising of 1863, new Governor-General Mikhail Muravyov-Vilensky decided to reorganize girls' gymnasiums along the same principles as boys' schools and eliminated Polish language as a subject from the curriculum. Due to Russification efforts and unlike elsewhere in the empire, parents and general public could not participate in shaping the curriculum, selecting teachers, or otherwise influencing the academics. Public input was accepted only on administrative and financial matters.

In 1867, once again, due to low enrollment, officials wanted to reorganize the gymnasium into a three-year school but it was not done to support Russification efforts.

=== Later years ===
Sources of funds for the gymnasium by year
Source	1872	1891	1900	1910
Office of the Institutions of Empress Maria	15.8%	8.5%	22.7%	22.9%
Taxes of Catholic nobles	45%			
Tuition fees	39.2%	73.2%	71.3%	77.1%
Revenue by the school		17.7%	6%	

When a number of Jewish students grew, local Jewish communities began petitioning the Office of the Institutions of Empress Maria to allow Judaism classes. The classes, taught in Russian, were allowed in 1870–1871. The classes were supposed to be financed by the parents but they complained of financial difficulties. The classes in Vilnius, Kaunas, and Grodno gymnasiums were made possible by a bequest of 2,400 rubles by Samuel Polyakov. The number of students grew necessitating separation of classes into two groups and rejection of applicants even if they successfully passed entrance exams. The gymnasium had 358 students in 1885 and 452 students in 1896. At the time, Jews were the largest group of students. However, after opening of separate Jewish schools, the number of Jewish students decreased even though the overall number of students continued to grow. In 1903, the school moved to the newly constructed dedicated building opposite of Lukiškės Square (present-day Lithuanian Academy of Music and Theatre on Gediminas Avenue).

In 1873, the Mariinsky Higher Women's School (Russian: Виленское Мариинское высшее женское училище) was opened in Vilnius. It was a seven-year school with eighth year preparing the women for teaching jobs. After the Russian Revolution of 1905, private gymnasiums were allowed. As a result, three new private girls' gymnasiums were established in the Vilna Governorate.

== Curriculum ==
Initially, compared to boys' gymnasiums, the girls' curriculum did not include Latin or Greek languages, physics or cosmography. Differences in the curriculums decreased in the 1870s. Overall, the curriculum focused on Russian language and literature with less attention devoted to math or sciences. Many teachers initially also taught at other schools, but gradually the gymnasium hired dedicated staff. By 1876, out of 12 teachers eight taught only at this school. Most frequently, it was math and science teachers who taught at multiple schools at once. Electives (such as French, German, Latin, drawing, pedagogics) allowed students to develop skill for the limited professional aspirations available to women at the time as teachers, nurses, or artists. Only Eastern Orthodox women could get teacher's positions in government schools; Roman Catholic women could only work in private schools.

During the Russian Revolution of 1905, parents of students at two boys' gymnasiums, girls' gymnasium, real and commerce schools sent a joint petition to the administrator of the Vilna Educational District. Among other things, the petition asked the schools to admit everyone regardless of religion or nationality. The parents wanted the curriculum to include lessons on Lithuanian, Polish, and Hebrew languages as well as history and geography of these nations taught by a person from these nations. They also wanted religious lesson in student's native language. The parents wanted a say in designing curriculum and making library selections as well as voting rights in the school boards. They also asked to allow students to freely select their extracurricular activities, organize student activities, attend public events and lectures, and otherwise have control of their free time. Of these demands, officials allowed only Polish and Lithuanian language lessons. The Poles were more active and organized the Polish lessons in 1906; Lithuanian lessons started in March 1912.

== Notable students ==
- Felicija Bortkevičienė, Lithuanian political activist and long-term publisher of Lietuvos ūkininkas and Lietuvos žinios
- Marija Piaseckaitė-Šlapelienė, Lithuanian bookstore owner and publisher
- Bronislava Šėmytė-Biržiškienė, wife of Mykolas Biržiška, signatory of the Act of Independence of Lithuania

== Bibliography ==
- Mastianica, Olga (2012). Pravėrus namų duris: Moterų švietimas Lietuvoje XVIII a. pabaigoje – XX a. pradžioje (in Lithuanian). Vilnius: Lietuvos istorijos institutas. ISBN 978-9955-847-62-5.
- Mastianica, Olga (2016). "Lietuvių kalba Vilniaus švietimo apygardos vidurinėse mokyklose 1906–1914 m." Lituanistika (in Lithuanian). 2 (62). ISSN 2424-4716.
