= Jonas Kriaučiūnas =

Lithuanian activist, publisher and editor

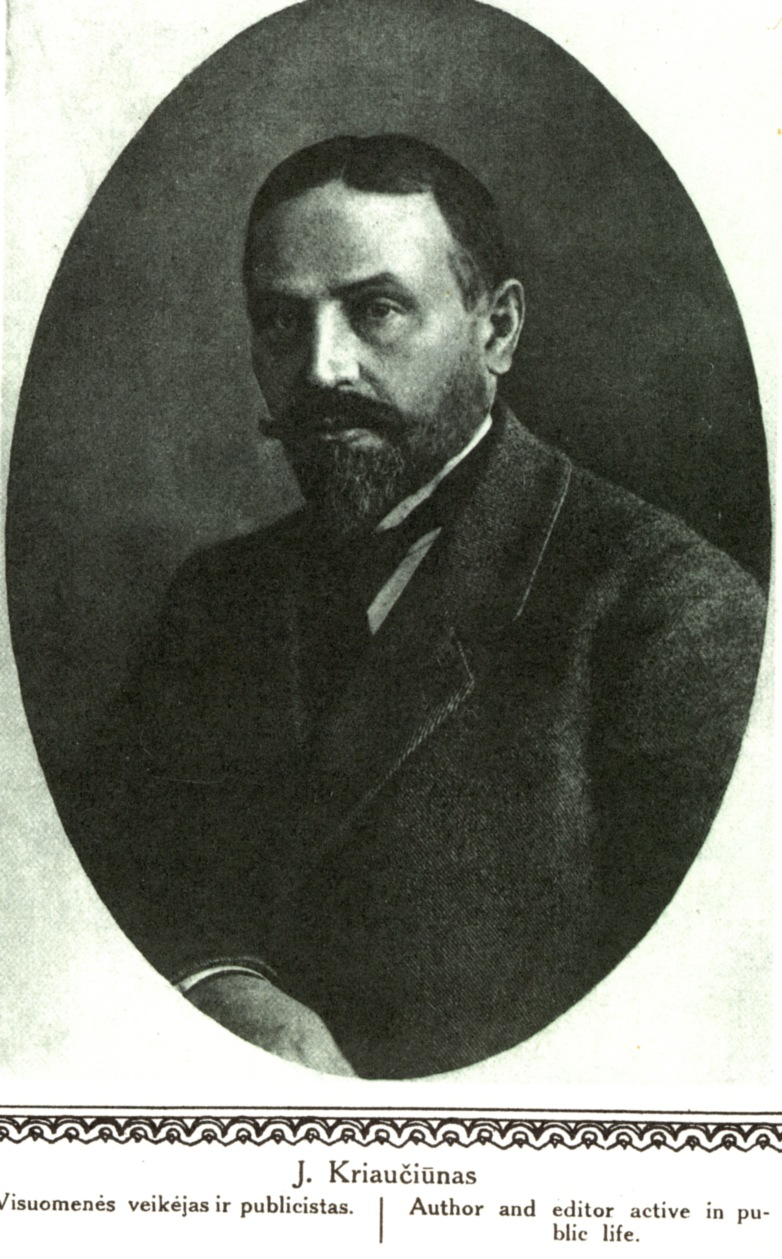
- Kriaučiūnas in Lithuania Album (1921)
- Born: 18 June 1864; Liepalotėliai, Suwałki Governorate, Congress Poland
- Died: 5 February 1941 (aged 76); Kaunas, Lithuanian SSR
- Education: Imperial Moscow University
- Occupations: Newspaper publisher and editor
- Years active: 1891–1916
- Movement: Lithuanian National Revival

Jonas Kriaučiūnas (18 June 1864 – 5 February 1941) was a Lithuanian activist during the Lithuanian National Revival mostly noted for editing and publishing Lithuanian periodicals Varpas and Ūkininkas in 1891–1895 and Vilniaus žinios in 1905–1906.

Born in Suvalkija, Kriaučiūnas studied medicine at the Imperial Moscow University but did not complete his studies. In 1889, to avoid conscription to the Russian Army, he moved to Tilsit in East Prussia where he worked at printing presses. When Juozas Adomaitis-Šernas fled East Prussia due to troubles with the police, Kriaučiūnas became responsible for editing and publishing Varpas and Ūkininkas. He attracted German police attention after he directed a Lithuanian historical play by the Birutė Society in early 1895. He returned to Lithuania but was arrested and imprisoned by the Tsarist police in Kaunas and Saint Petersburg. For violating the Lithuanian press ban, he was sentenced to three years of exile in Tallinn. In 1904, Petras Vileišis offered him a job publishing the first Lithuanian daily Vilniaus žinios (he resigned in January 1906). In late 1905, Kriaučiūnas was one of the main initiators and organizers of the Great Seimas of Vilnius. He later published and edited Rygos garsas in Riga and German-sponsored Dabartis. After World War I, he retired from public life.

== Biography ==
=== Early life and education ===
Kriaučiūnas was born in the village of Liepalotėliai in the present-day Šakiai District Municipality. It was then part of Congress Poland, client state of the Russian Empire. After attending primary schools in Žemoji Panemunė and Lekėčiai, he was admitted to the second grade at the Suwałki Gymnasium. He immediately subscribed to Aušra, the first Lithuanian periodical aimed at the Greater Lithuania where it was illegal due to the Lithuanian press ban. When the issues were confiscated by the school officials, he found a way to obtain Aušra and other illegal Lithuanian publications via Petras Kriaučiūnas (no relation) in Marijampolė.

After graduating the gymnasium in 1886, he started studying medicine at the Imperial Moscow University. As a student, he contributed articles to Lithuanian periodicals, including Šviesa and Lietuviškasis balsas. He also participated in an informal club of Lithuanian students in Moscow that included Jonas Šliūpas, Jonas Jablonskis, and others. He abruptly quit the university after three years (possibly due to a nervous illness) and returned to Lithuania.

=== In Tilsit ===
Trying to avoid conscription to the Russian Army, he emigrated to Tilsit in East Prussia (now Sovetsk, Kaliningrad Oblast) in fall 1889. He found employment at the printing press of Ernst Weyer and became an active participant in the Lithuanian cultural life. He briefly reestablished Šviesa (it lasted from January to August 1890). When Juozas Adomaitis-Šernas fled East Prussia due to troubles with the police, Kriaučiūnas became responsible for editing and publishing Varpas. He also edited Ūkininkas and closely collaborated with Vincas Kudirka. In addition, he contributed various articles to the Lithuanian periodicals published in the United States. In 1893, he started printing a history of Lithuania by Simonas Daukantas, but managed to print only 96 pages up to the year 1201. The publication was completed by Jurgis Bielinis in 1899. Kriaučiūnas joined the cultural Birutė Society and directed its first amateur theater performance in February 1895 (it was a historical drama about the Siege of Kaunas (1362) by Aleksandras Fromas-Gužutis).

To confuse the police, he assumed the name of Johan Lubovsky. However, by 1895, he felt being followed and investigated by the police. He particularly compromised himself by directing the Lithuanian play in February. He decided to return to his birthplace as the new Tsar Nicholas II of Russia had announced a general amnesty. However, the Tsarist police arrested him in 1897. It was part of a larger operation by the Tsarist police directed against the Sietynas Society which saw arrests of 35 Lithuanian book smugglers. He spent two years in prison in Kaunas and Saint Petersburg (in Kresty Prison) and three years in exile in Tallinn. After the exile, he moved to Warsaw in 1892.

=== In Vilnius ===
After the Lithuanian press ban was lifted in May 1904, Petras Vileišis offered him a job publishing the first Lithuanian daily Vilniaus žinios. Kriaučiūnas joined the editorial staff but quickly quarreled with Povilas Višinskis who accused him of chauvinism and anti-Semitism. Vileišis supported Kriaučiūnas and Višinskis resigned in early 1905. Kriaučiūnas sometimes was blamed for the conservative stance of Vilniaus žinios (e.g. in writings of Felicija Bortkevičienė). He resigned from the newspaper in January 1906.

Kriaučiūnas was a member of the Lithuanian Mutual Aid Society of Vilnius. During the Russian Revolution of 1905, Kriaučiūnas and Jonas Basanavičius raised the idea of organizing the Great Seimas of Vilnius which took place in December 1905. It was an important event in the development of the political Lithuanian national consciousness. Kriaučiūnas was elected to the board of the National Democrats Party (Tautiškoji demokratų partija) which was established right after the Great Seimas. In 1907, he published a Polish brochure on the Lithuania–Poland relations. He was particularly critical of Poles earning himself a label of Polonophobe.

=== Later life ===
Kriaučiūnas moved to Kaunas where he continued working in the publishing industry. After moving to Riga, he edited Rygos garsas in 1909–1910. He became ill and returned to his native Liepalotėliai to recuperate. He then moved to Kaunas. During World War I, he was in Moscow but decided to return to German-occupied Lithuania. Via Scandinavia, he travelled to Tilsit where he edited Dabartis. After realizing that the newspaper was intended to Germanize Lithuanians, he quit and returned to Kaunas. In December 1915, together with Saliamonas Banaitis, Adomas Jakštas, and others he published a proclamation with a proposal for a Lithuanian–Belarusian–Latvian confederation along the historical traditions of the Grand Duchy of Lithuania. The proposal did not attract greater interest.

After the war, Kriaučiūnas did not return to active cultural life. Aleksandras Merkelis wrote that Kriaučiūnas was not well liked because he was suspicious of everyone and frequently changed his political opinions. He worked as a notary and published articles with memoirs in Lietuva, Rytas, Lietuvos aidas, Naujoji Romuva, and other periodicals. A separate memoir book was published in 1936. He died on 5 February 1941 in the Kaunas Red Cross Hospital from a stomach illness and was buried in Ilguva. To mark his 125th birth anniversary, a carved oak sculpture was erected in the cemetery.
