= Lithuanian Mutual Aid Society of Vilnius =

Lithuanian cultural organization

The Lithuanian Mutual Aid Society of Vilnius (Lithuanian: Vilniaus lietuvių savitarpinės pašalpos draugija) was a mutual aid and cultural society active in Vilnius, then part of the Russian Empire, from 1904 to 1915. It originated from the illegal social club known as the Twelve Apostles of Vilnius which formed around 1895. The society was an integral part of establishing Vilnius as the cultural center of the Lithuanian National Revival.

The club organized Lithuanian cultural evenings and distribution of the illegal Lithuanian publications, but its major accomplishment was obtaining the Church of Saint Nicholas for the needs of the Lithuanian community in Vilnius. Before, there was no church in the city that held masses in Lithuanian. Starting in May 1896, members of the club submitted repeated petitions to various religious and civil authorities until their demands were met in December 1901. The Church of Saint Nicholas remained the only church in the city that provided Lithuanian-language services until 1939.

In 1904, the club decided to establish the legal Lithuanian Mutual Aid Society of Vilnius chaired by Antanas Vileišis. It was the first legal Lithuanian organization in Vilnius. It was active until the German occupation of Vilnius during World War I. Many of the society's activities led to the establishment of separate more specialized Lithuanian societies. The society continued the fight for the Lithuanian language in public life; its efforts eventually led to lessons of the Lithuanian language at the Vilnius Priest Seminary and several schools in the city as well as religious instruction in Lithuanian at primary schools. The Mutual Aid Society founded and continued to run a five-year Lithuanian school, the first Lithuanian school in Vilnius, which continued to operate until May 1918. The society also supported Lithuanian female servants who went on to establish the separate Society of Saint Zita in 1912. To raise funds for its activities, the society organized Lithuanian cultural events (theater performances, concerts, dances, etc.). These cultural activities diminished after the establishment of the Rūta Society in 1909.

== Twelve Apostles of Vilnius ==
=== Formation and activities ===
As the Lithuanian National Revival intensified at the end of the 19th century, Lithuanian activists started coalescing into clubs and societies but they were illegal due to various Russification policies pursued by the Russian Empire. Around 1895, several Lithuanians in Vilnius gathered in a club which became known as the Twelve Apostles of Vilnius as the first members were twelve men. The name was only half-serious but reflected the missionary mindset of its members, i.e. they saw themselves as apostles of the Lithuanian National Revival. The club was initiated by Catholic priest Juozapas Ambraziejus-Ambrozevičius, nobleman Donatas Malinauskas, and forester Povilas Matulionis. It was the first Lithuanian society in Vilnius. The club united people of different social status and political leanings; according to the memoirs of Jonas Vileišis, a few members could not speak Lithuanian but considered themselves to be Lithuanian. The club was informal (i.e. it did not have statutes, protocols, or programs), but its main goal was to promote the use of the Lithuanian language in public life and, specifically, in Catholic churches. The club meetings took place in an apartment of one of its members. Occasionally, the meetings were also attended by Polish activists, including Józef Piłsudski.

The club first appeared in public in December 1898 during the opening of the Adam Mickiewicz Monument in Warsaw: its members laid a wreath with a Lithuanian inscription and later during a dinner veterinarian Elijošius Nonevičius delivered a speech about the Lithuanian National Revival. From 1900, members of the club organized regular deliveries of Lithuanian publications from East Prussia, hid them in their apartments or the attic of the Church of Saint Nicholas, and arranged their distribution (due to the Lithuanian press ban, Lithuanian publications were illegal in the Russian Empire). It is believed that in 1900–1902, the club organized three illegal amateur theater performances. In primitive conditions, club members staged simple comedies by Józef Bliziński and by Žemaitė and Gabrielė Petkevičaitė-Bitė. In January and February 1901, the club organized two Lithuanian cultural evenings that attracted 500–600 participants and featured performances by a Lithuanian choir organized by Juozapas Ambraziejus-Ambrozevičius.

Members of the club included Felicija Bortkevičienė and her husband Jonas, three brothers Petras, Jonas, and Antanas Vileišis with his wife Emilija Vileišienė. Most of the members were well educated specialists and conservative democrats. They did not seek to change the Tsarist regime; instead they sought a compromise with the authorities hoping they would allow cultural Lithuanian activities. The club was illegal and the Okhrana had an informant report about its activities, but no repressive actions were taken against the club.

=== Lithuanian language masses ===
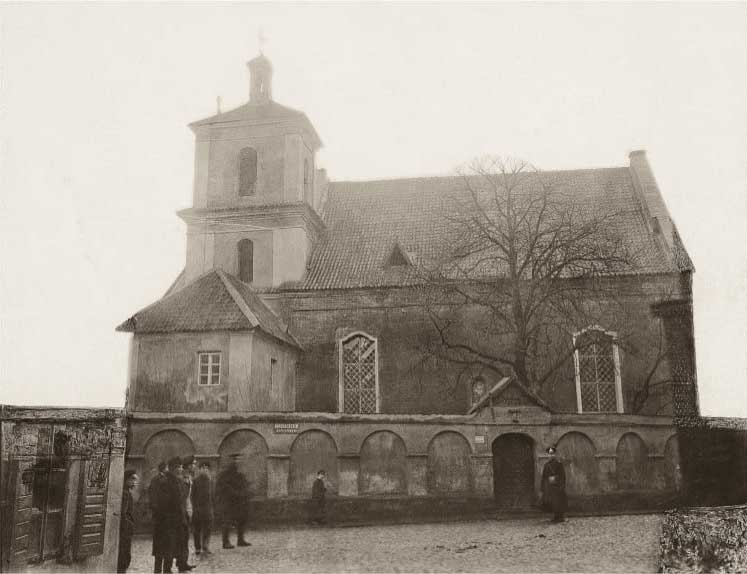
Church of Saint Nicholas in Vilnius in 1902–1903

Lithuanians in Vilnius did not have a place to gather. Therefore, the first major task of the club was to get permission to hold Lithuanian language masses at the Church of Saint Nicholas. At the time, no church in Vilnius held masses in Lithuanian. The problem was raised in the Lithuanian press as early as 1885 in Aušra, but the first known petition with about 300 signatures to auxiliary bishop Ludwik Zdanowicz was delivered in May 1896 by four members of the club. The Lithuanians also petitioned Governor of Vilnius Alexander Frese and Governor General of Vilnius Peter Orzhevsky but their request was denied. Members of the club petitioned the new bishop Stefan Aleksander Zwierowicz in spring and fall 1898 but were also refused.

Lithuanians were forced to change their tactic and, hoping for a fait accompli, started singing Lithuanian hymns at the Church of Saint Nicholas in October 1899 and at the Church of the Ascension in January 1900. The action at the Church of Saint Nicholas did not provoke a reaction from the Diocese of Vilnius, but the priests at the Church of the Ascension were ordered to cease Lithuanian signing and were disciplined. This prompted Donatas Malinauskas to request copies of earlier petitions from the diocese so that he could prepare a separate publication about the issue in Russian. Perhaps sensing why the documents were requested, bishop Zwierowicz made a brief note on the documents that the petition would be granted "in due time". Malinauskas prepared the publication in Russian and Lithuanian. Due to an error by a state censor, the publication was approved in August 1900 – it was the first legal Lithuanian publication printed in Lithuania since 1865.

While bishop Zwierowicz was on an ad limina visit in Rome, Lithuanians petitioned Karol Antoni Niedziałkowski, administrator of the Archdiocese of Mohilev. Niedziałkowski was sympathetic to the Lithuanian cause, but he had already effectively resigned and could no longer help. In April 1901, another petition to bishop Zwierowicz was sent by ten Lithuanian priests in Saint Petersburg (among them were four professors of the Saint Petersburg Roman Catholic Theological Academy – Kazimieras Jaunius, Jonas Mačiulis, Pranciškus Karevičius, and Ignotas Baltrušis). It was followed by the fourth petition by Vilnius residents in May. When these petitions were once again rejected, Lithuanians began preparing a petition to Pope Leo XIII. At the same time, they petitioned the new archbishop of Mogilev Bolesław Hieronim Kłopotowski who was supportive and pushed Zwierowicz to assign a church to the Lithuanian community. Reportedly, he even threatened to complain to the pope if Zwierowicz refused.

This forced Zwierowicz to react and he sent out a survey to priests in Vilnius on what should be done. Of 32 responses, 26 were for granting a church to the Lithuanians. The situation was changing and Lithuanians were granted concessions – Lithuanian hymns could be sung every other Sunday at the Church of Saint Nicholas and Lithuanian ceremonies for the commemoration of the 10th anniversary of Papal encyclical Rerum novarum were held at Vilnius Cathedral. On 17 December 1901, the Church of Saint Nicholas was granted to the Lithuanian community and Juozapas Kukta was selected as its rector. The new Lithuanian church became a center of Lithuanian religious life in the city.

The campaign for the Church of Saint Nicholas was unusual in that it was driven by largely an irreligious circle of Lithuanian intelligentsia and not by the Lithuanian clergy. The fight was widely covered in the Lithuanian press, particularly by Jonas Vileišis in Varpas and Naujienos. This coverage helped to spread the idea that Vilnius was the capital of Lithuanians and position Polish clergy (particularly the bishop) as an enemy of the Lithuanian National Revival.

== Mutual Aid Society ==
=== Establishment and membership ===
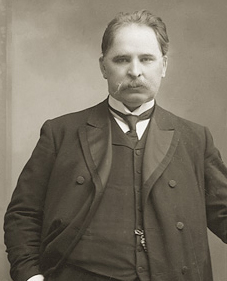
Antanas Vileišis, chairman of the Mutual Aid Society

Since the Twelve Apostles of Vilnius was an illegal club, its activities were limited. In 1904, its members decided to establish a legal society. At the time, only mutual aid and charitable societies were allowed – cultural and other societies were allowed only after the Russian Revolution of 1905. The club adopted the name Lithuanian Mutual Aid Society of Vilnius. It received government approval on 29 January 1904 and held its founding meeting at the Church of Saint Nicholas on 14 March 1904. The society's statute was approved by the government in October 1904. It was then translated by Jonas Jablonskis to Lithuanian and published by the Józef Zawadzki printing shop becoming one of the first Lithuanian publications after the Lithuanian press ban was lifted in May 1904. The society initially rented its premises at the clergy house of the Church of Saint Nicholas.

Its founding members were 24 people. The founding meeting in March 1904 elected the first board – chairman Antanas Vileišis, treasurer Juozapas Kukta, secretary Antanas Smetona. Vileišis was reelected as chairman every year except in 1906 when he was replaced by Povilas Matulionis. Other officers and board members over the years included Jurgis Šlapelis, Mykolas Sleževičius, Jonas Basanavičius, Vladas Mironas, Jonas Vileišis, Jonas Kriaučiūnas, Donatas Malinauskas, Liudas Gira. In total, the board met 136 times and the society organized 16 general member meetings. The number of society's members fluctuated between a low of 46 in 1904 and a high of 67 in 1906. Part of the reason for the low membership was high membership fees which were initially set at 25 rubles for joining and 6 rubles annual dues. Such high fees were dictated by the Tsarist authorities. The initial fee was lowered to 12 rubles in 1907 and to 2 rubles in 1910 (the annual fee remained at 6 rubles). In 1910, the society also received permission to expand its activities outside of Vilnius to the entire Vilna Governorate and to deliver lectures and to establish schools, libraries, shelters, and consumers' co-operative. However, the society did not grow. The last board meeting took place on 15 August 1915 when it was decided to suspend the activities due to the approaching Eastern Front.

=== Activities ===
==== Lithuanian church services ====
Initially, the society had very narrow goals of providing financial support to its members (e.g. loans, job search assistance, grants in case of sickness or death). It was clear that Lithuanian activists had broader goals. The society fought for the Lithuanian language and demanded its use in churches and schools. In February 1905, the society decided to petition bishop of Vilnius Eduard von der Ropp to allow Lithuanian services at other churches in Vilnius, to introduce Lithuanian language lectures at the Vilnius Priest Seminary, and to teach religion in primary schools in Lithuanian. Jonas Basanavičius initiated a separate society, the Union for the Return of the Lithuanian Language Rights in Lithuanian Churches (Sąjunga lietuvių kalbos teisėms grąžinti Lietuvos bažnyčiose), to fight for Lithuanian language in churches in July 1906. Therefore, the Mutual Aid Society was little involved going forward. The two demands on teaching in Lithuanian at the Priest Seminary and primary schools were eventually granted.

==== Lithuanian schools ====
Number of students at the five-year Lithuanian school
School year	At start of year	At end of year	Graduates
1908/1909	64	36	–
1909/1910	62	46	–
1910/1911	67	51	6
1911/1912	69	44	5
1912/1913	62	46	7
1913/1914	73	55	5
1914/1915	95	97	2
1915/1916	82	?	?
1916/1917	62	?	?
1917/1918	56	?	?

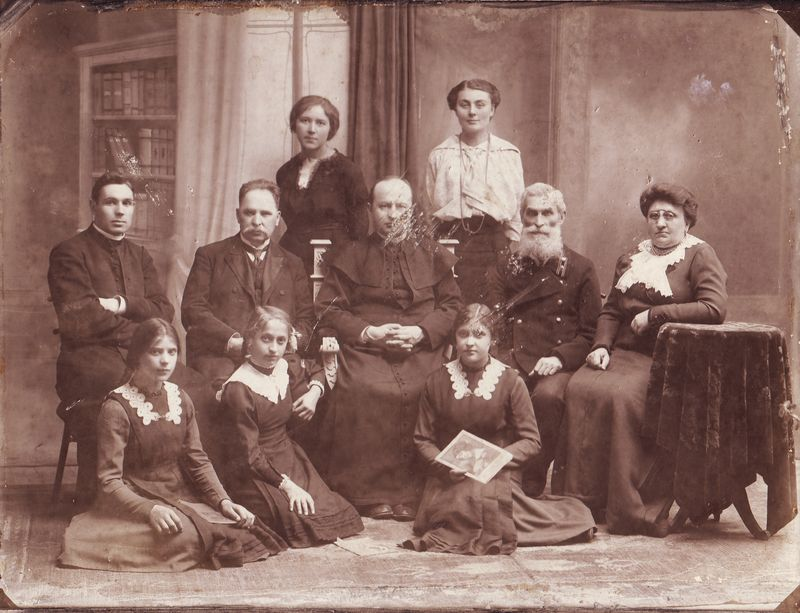
Staff and three students (first row) of the five-year school in 1914. Priest Juozapas Kukta sits in the middle.

Demands for Lithuanian-language schools intensified during the Russian Revolution of 1905. In July 1905, the society sought to introduce Lithuanian language lessons in other city schools. Permission for the language lessons was received from the Ministry of National Education in November 1905. The society raised funds and launched free Lithuanian lessons at four city schools in early 1906. The lessons were initially taught by Jonas Jablonskis and later by Antanas Smetona and Juozas Kairiūkštis. In March 1906, the task of raising funds and organizing the lessons was taken over by a separate committee.

In May 1905, the society decided to establish a Lithuanian primary school. Officially, the society petitioned the government to allow a shelter for children at the Church of Saint Nicholas which would be used as a cover for the primary school. The permit was received in October 1905. The Mutual Aid Society allotted 400 rubles for the upkeep of the shelter.

In November 1906, the society decided to establish a legal five-year co-ed Lithuanian school. The permit was received in March 1907. The official founders of the school was Antanas Vileišis and Povilas Matulionis. The school opened with 26 students at the clergy house of the Church of Saint Nicholas on 16 August 1907. Most students and materials were transferred from the semi-legal primary school. In February 1908, the city duma granted eight neglected rooms for the school in the former Franciscan monastery near the church. After repairs, the school occupied five rooms, society's library and museum took two rooms, and the last room was used as the board room. The new school officially opened on 22 October 1908. The Mutual Aid Society covered the tuition and provided other financial support (e.g. school supplies, proper clothing and shoes) to the impoverished students. This was a heavy burden on the society's budget; in 1912–1913, almost all of its revenue of 1,237 rubles was spent on the school. The school faced particular difficulties during World War I when the number of students jumped to 107 due to war refugees arriving to Vilnius. The school was closed in May 1918 when, due to epidemics, the occupying German authorities closed all schools that did not have their own dormitories.

==== Female servant society ====
Lithuanian female servants, who frequently arrived to Vilnius from villages, were particularly vulnerable to exploitation. The Society of Saint Zita was organized by the philanthropist Józef Montwiłł, but it was dominated by Polish culture and discouraged and suppressed Lithuanian activities. In December 1906, the Lithuanian members separated from the Polish society and became an autonomous section of the Mutual Aid Society under the name of Community of St. Nicholas. Earlier in May 1906, the city duma granted three rooms in the former Franciscan monastery near the Church of Saint Nicholas to the Mutual Aid Society. The society decided to turn these rooms into a shelter for Lithuanian female servants. In 1909, the members of the servant society numbered some 400; about 20 women lived in the shelter. The servant society officially established the separate Lithuanian Society of Saint Zita in December 1912.

In August 1908, the society also established evening courses for the servants. Two-year courses covered Lithuanian and Russian languages, arithmetic, and religion. The courses attempted to prepare the women so that they could illegally teach children in villages (this was a common practice among parents who did not want their children to attend Russian primary schools). In 1912, the courses had 48 students.

==== Cultural evenings ====
To raise funds for its activities, the society could organize Lithuanian cultural events (concerts, theater performances, cultural or musical evenings). However, it was limited to four such events per year. Obtaining permits for theater performances was a particularly burdensome process; among the requirements was obtaining approval from the Governor General of Vilna. The first dance evening was held on 17 October 1904 and was attended by more than 250 people, but the evening was not profitable. The first theater performance (staging of the comedy America in the Bathhouse and one-act farce by Johann Baptist von Schweitzer) was organized on 6 February 1905. It was very successful and netted a profit of 290 rubles. In later evenings the society staged comedies by Joseph Conrad, Juozas Tumas-Vaižgantas, Žemaitė, Michał Bałucki, operetta by Mikas Petrauskas, dramas by Aleksandras Fromas-Gužutis and Juliusz Słowacki, and other plays. The evenings also often featured Lithuanian choirs directed by Mikas Petrauskas, Juozas Tallat-Kelpša, and Mikalojus Konstantinas Čiurlionis. A special Christmas event for about 200 children was held in December 1905. In addition to Vilnius, the society performed in Ignalina, Musninkai, Švenčionys, Valkininkai, Kybartai, Šiauliai. On 15–16 August 1909, the society organized its largest event – the 10th anniversary celebration of the first Lithuanian theater performance in 1899 in Palanga. The society staged the comedy America in the Bathhouse (which was staged in 1899) and the first Lithuanian opera Birutė by Gabrielius Landsbergis-Žemkalnis. The event cost 783 rubles and left the society with a loss of 128 rubles.

In staging the performances, the society at times competed and at times cooperated with the Kanklės of Vilnius Society established in 1905 and chaired by Gabrielius Landsbergis-Žemkalnis. However, this society became inactive in 1908 and was replaced by the Rūta Society which was more successful. Many of the performers joined the Rūta Society and, in September 1910, the theater groups of the Mutual Aid Society and Rūta officially separated from these societies to form an independent Lithuanian Artists' Union of Vilnius (Vilniaus lietuvių artistų sąjunga) which two years later established the first theater company. The Artists' Union agreed to organize four theater performances per year for the benefit of the Mutual Aid Society which ceased organizing cultural events altogether in 1912.

== Bibliography ==
- Aničas, Jonas (1999). Antanas ir Emilija Vileišiai: Gyvenimo ir veiklos bruožai (in Lithuanian). Alma littera. ISBN 9986-02-794-2.
- Balkelis, Tomas (2009). The Making of Modern Lithuania. BASEES/Routledge Series on Russian and East European Studies. Routledge. ISBN 978-0-415-45470-4.
- Jurėnienė, Virginija (February 2013). "Lietuvos moterų draugijos ir jų veikla XX a. pirmoje pusėje" (PDF). Žodynas (in Lithuanian). Lyčių studijų centras, Šiaulių universitetas.
- Kairiūkštytė, Nastazija (7 September 2018) [2004]. ""Dvylika Vilniaus apaštalų"". Visuotinė lietuvių enciklopedija (in Lithuanian). Mokslo ir enciklopedijų leidybos centras.
- Merkys, Vytautas (1994). Knygnešių laikai 1864–1904 (in Lithuanian). Vilnius: Valstybinis leidybos centras. ISBN 9986-09-018-0.
- Raškauskas, Kęstutis (2007). "Kova dėl lietuvių kalbos teisių Vilniaus religiniame gyvenime 1896–1901 m." (PDF). Darbai ir dienos (in Lithuanian). 48. ISSN 1392-0588.
- Trinkūnaitė, Šarūnė (2015). "Vilniaus lietuvių dramos artistų bendrovės sutartis: teatro atnaujinimo viltys ir utopijos" (PDF). Ars et praxis (in Lithuanian). III. ISSN 2351-4744.
- Zabarauskas, Vitalius (9 January 2020) [2014]. "Vilniaus lietuvių savitarpinės pašalpos draugija". Visuotinė lietuvių enciklopedija (in Lithuanian). Mokslo ir enciklopedijų leidybos centras.
