= Juozapas Ambraziejus =

- Born: 9 February 1855; Suwałki Governorate, Congress Poland
- Died: 27 June 1915 (aged 60); Vilnius, Russian Empire
- Burial place: Rasos Cemetery
- Other names: Juozapas Ambrozevičius; Józef Ambrożewicz
- Education: Sejny Priest Seminary
- Occupation: Catholic priest
- Movement: Lithuanian National Revival

Juozapas Ambraziejus or Ambrozevičius (1855–1915) was a Roman Catholic priest active in Lithuanian culture life in Vilnius in 1896–1908.

Educated at the Sejny Priest Seminary, Ambraziejus first worked in the Diocese of Łomża before he transferred to the Diocese of Vilnius in 1892. He worked at several rural parishes before he received a position in Vilnius. He joined Lithuanian cultural life in the city and was one of the organizers of the illegal club known as the Twelve Apostles of Vilnius which later grew into the Lithuanian Mutual Aid Society of Vilnius. He was one of the first organizers of Lithuanian cultural evenings (though they were illegal until 1904–1905) and organized the first Lithuanian choirs in the city. He campaigned for the use of the Lithuanian language at Catholic churches and attempted to combat some of the clergy's Polonization efforts. In particular, he opposed bishop Edward von Ropp and was suspended from his priestly duties in 1906. He also wrote and published a catechism without approbation, which was added to Index Librorum Prohibitorum in 1907. After the Lithuanian press ban was lifted in 1904, Ambraziejus established the illustrated agricultural magazine Lietuvos bitininkas (Lithuanian Beekeeper) which was later reorganized as Šviesa (Light). When the publication failed in 1908, Ambraziejus retired from public life and ran a shelter for the city's poor until his death in 1915.

== Biography ==
Ambraziejus was born in Suvalkija to a family of Lithuanian farmers. He studied at the Marijampolė Gymnasium in 1869–1874 and the Sejny Priest Seminary in 1874–1880. Ordained as a priest, he was first assigned to the Jedwabne parish. In 1883–1887, he was a vicar in a parish in Łomża. In 1888–1892, he had no official duties and lived in the Benedictine Monastery in Łomża. In late 1892, he received permission from the bishop of Vilnius to move to Vilnius. Just few months later, he was sent to work as a pastor in the parishes of Naujas Strūnaitis (where he started singing religious hymns and teaching catechism in Lithuanian) and Luchai. In 1894, he was demoted to a vicar in Varniany.

He then departed to Saint Petersburg, reportedly to seek medical treatment but also to inquire various Tsarist officials about lifting of the Lithuanian press ban. Via professor Vladimir Lamansky, he met with Evgeny Feoktistov, head of the press department at the Ministry of Internal Affairs. In 1896, he returned to Vilnius and briefly served as a vicar at the Church of All Saints and the Church of St. Raphael the Archangel before a more permanent assignment as a vicar to the Church of St. Johns where he continued to work until his suspension in May 1906. After the failure of his magazine Šviesa, he retired from public life and ran a shelter for the city's poor in Užupis. He died in Vilnius in June 1915 and was buried at the Rasos Cemetery.

== Works and activities ==
=== Lithuanian language ===
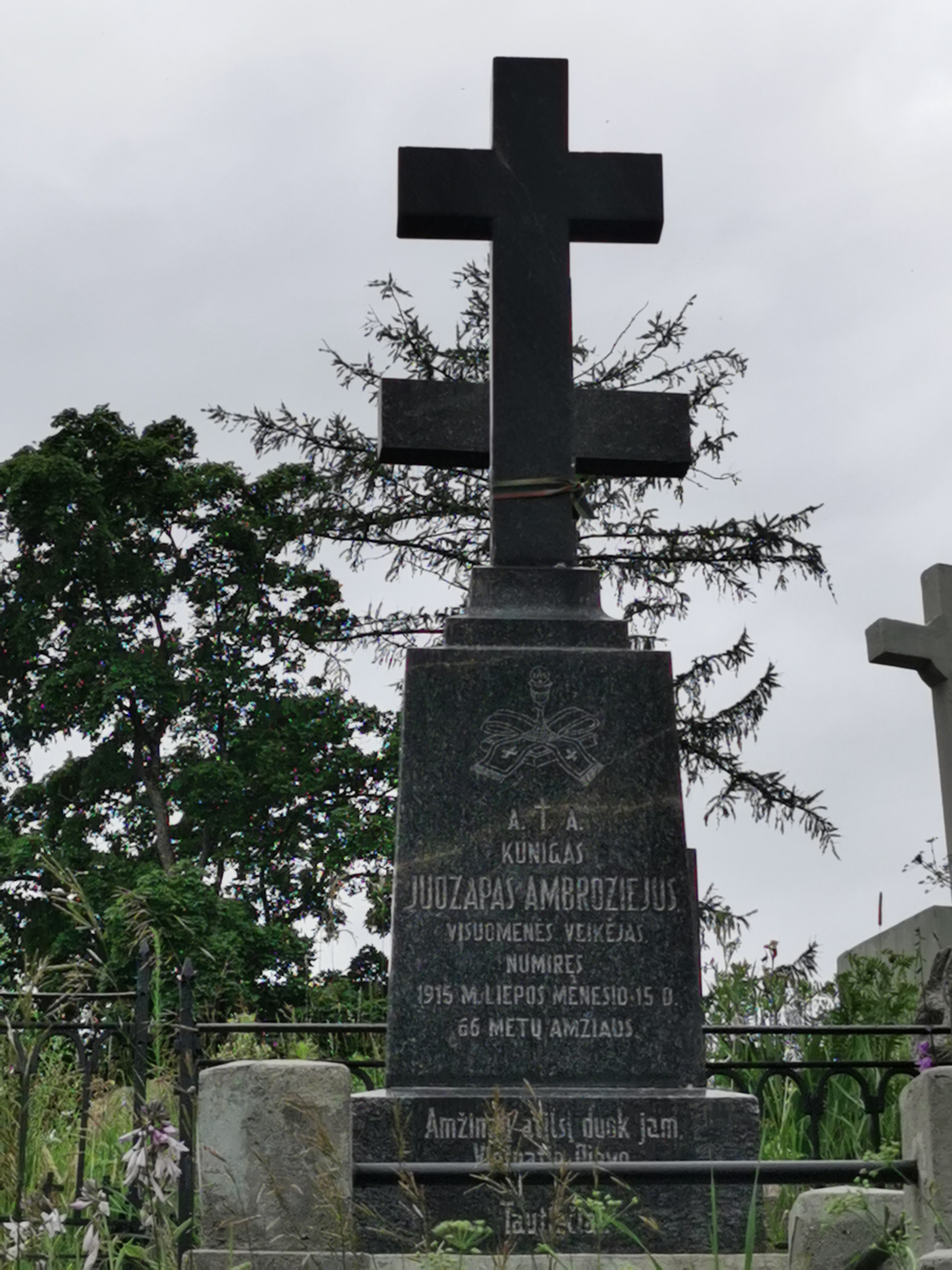
Tombstone of Ambraziejus in Rasos Cemetery

In Vilnius, Ambraziejus joined the Lithuanian cultural life and became one of the founders of the illegal club known as the Twelve Apostles of Vilnius which later grew into the Lithuanian Mutual Aid Society of Vilnius. He recruited Donatas Malinauskas and Marija Šlapelienė to join the Lithuanian National Revival. One of the goals of these societies was to fight for the Lithuanian language services in Catholic churches and to resist Polonization of Lithuanians by the priests. Ambraziejus helped obtaining the Church of Saint Nicholas for the needs of the Lithuanian community in Vilnius; Lithuanians fought for the church from 1896 to 1901. However, likely to avoid sanctions from the ecclesiastical hierarchy, none of the petitions on the matter bear his signature.

Ambraziejus was one of the first to organize Lithuanian cultural evenings even though they were illegal until 1904–1905. He organized the first Lithuanian mixed choir in 1896 using beekeeping courses as an official excuse. In 1898, he organized a Lithuanian church choir and a cultural evening in his apartment. Based on the Polish hymn Boże, coś Polskę, Ambraziejus composed Lithuanian hymn Dieve, kaip ilgai Lietuva varguose (God, Lithuania Has Suffered for so Long). He also composed Ant Dauguvos skardų (On the Cliffs of Daugava) about the Lithuanian battles with the Teutonic Order and several other songs. His choir performed at two Lithuanian evenings that attracted 500–600 people in January and February 1901.

When the Tsarist authorities began considering lifting the Lithuanian press ban, Ambraziejus established contacts with Alexey Kharuzin, head of the office of the Vilna Governorate-General. He met with Kharuzin several times to discuss and debate the press ban. Kharuzin recommended to Governor-General Pyotr Sviatopolk-Mirsky to lift the press ban. This lead Ambraziejus to believe that the lifting of the ban in May 1904 was largely due to his actions.

In 1905, Ambraziejus joined the organizational committee tasked with organizing the Great Seimas of Vilnius. On 15 November, he signed a controversial memorandum ten points of demands and declarations addressed to Sergei Witte, Prime Minister of the Russian Empire. He participated in the founding of the National Democrats Party (Tautiškoji demokratų partija) right after the Great Seimas. In February 1906, he participated in organizing the election to the first Russian State Duma.

In 1906, Ambraziejus published a short catechism which had a question on what bishop should be obeyed. The answer was that only the bishop who was selected by Lithuanians themselves and approved by the pope should be obeyed (Ambraziejus was particularly against bishop Edward von Ropp and considered him illegitimate as he did not sufficiently support the Lithuanian language in churches). For this and for publishing the catechism without proper approbation, Ambraziejus was suspended from his priestly duties. On 12 April 1907, the book was added to Index Librorum Prohibitorum, the list of prohibited books by the Vatican. It is the only Lithuanian book on the list. Together with Jonas Basanavičius and others, Ambraziejus established the Union for the Return of the Lithuanian Language Rights in Lithuanian Churches (Sąjunga lietuvių kalbos teisėms grąžinti Lietuvos bažnyčiose) in July 1907. Ambraziejus was secretary and later chairman of this union.

In spring 1906, after Lithuanians received permission to teach Lithuanian in schools, Ambraziejus was elected to a committee that raised funds and organized such lesson at various city schools. In late 1906, Ambraziejus was one of the co-founders of the Lithuanian Scientific Society. In 1906, Ambraziejus published a primer. In 1907, he published a 552-page Polish–Lithuanian–Russian dictionary. In total, in 1906–1909, Ambraziejus published twelve booklets.

=== Beekeeping and Šviesa ===
Ambraziejus was interested in beekeeping. In 1891–1893, he published three books on beekeeping in Polish. At the time, most popular rectangular beehives in Lithuania were popularized by the Polish beekeeper Kazimierz Lewicki. In observing beehives, Ambraziejus determined that round (similar to a tree stump) beehives would be more natural for the bees. In 1903, he exhibited his round beehives and a tool to extract honey from honeycombs at the first Russian Beekeeping Exhibition in Saint Petersburg and was awarded a silver medal. In 1908, he published a booklet about beekeeping in Lithuanian. He promoted venom from bee stingers as a remedy for rheumatism and created a soap from honey.

In 1905, Ambraziejus established and edited the illustrated magazine Lietuvos bitininkas (Lithuanian Beekeeper). After 12 issues, the magazine was reorganized into a Catholic journal for farmers Šviesa (light) with a weekly supplement Šviesos laiškelis (Newspaper of Šviesa). The publication was supported by donations from Lithuanian Americans. Though the publications were intended for former, Ambraziejus published many articles on the issues of the Lithuanian language in the Diocese of Vilnius (it became the official publication of the Union for the Return of the Lithuanian Language Rights in Lithuanian Churches in 1907). The magazine also raised the idea of purchasing Verkiai Manor (priced at 800,000 rubles) and turning into a campus for various Lithuanian agricultural and craft schools. However, this idea did not become popular and readership of Šviesa continued to decline. It was discontinued after 56 issues in 1908. Feeling misunderstood and disappointed with the Lithuanian public, Ambraziejus retired from public life. He was stubborn and abrasive which made him unpopular. With the funds raised for the Verkiai Manor (about 50,000 rubles) he purchased a house in Užupis district of Vilnius and established a shelter for the city's poor. He died in obscurity on 27 June 1915.
