= Šviesa =

Lithuanian-language newspaper

Šviesa or Szviesa (literally: The Light) was a short-lived Lithuanian-language newspaper printed during the Lithuanian press ban in Tilsit (now Sovetsk) in German East Prussia and smuggled to Lithuania by the knygnešiai. The monthly newspaper was published from August 1887 to August 1888 and from January to August 1890. 50- to 32-page newspaper had circulation of about 1,000. A special 72-page supplement was published in 1888. Influence of Šviesa was not very significant as it did not last and did not offer new ideas.

After the first national Lithuanian newspaper Aušra ceased its publication due to financial difficulties, Lithuanian students in Moscow and young priests, disappointed by secular Aušra, organized publication of Šviesa. They sought to take leadership of the Lithuanian National Revival and propagate Catholic ideals. Edited by priest Antanas Vytartas and Jonas Kriaučiūnas, Šviesa was geared towards a common villager and included many practical articles about farming, husbandry, forestry. Other articles explained Christianity, promoted education, developed nationalistic ideas. Šviesa did not protest Russification or other policies of the Russian Empire. It also had conflicting views of Polish culture: sometimes it would criticize Polonized Lithuanians and argue for distinctively Lithuanian culture, but in other cases common Catholic faith would take precedence against Russian Orthodoxy.

Contributors included Antanas Baranauskas, Jonas Jablonskis, Petras Leonas, Pranas Mašiotas, Maironis.
