= Rūta Society =

Lithuanian cultural society

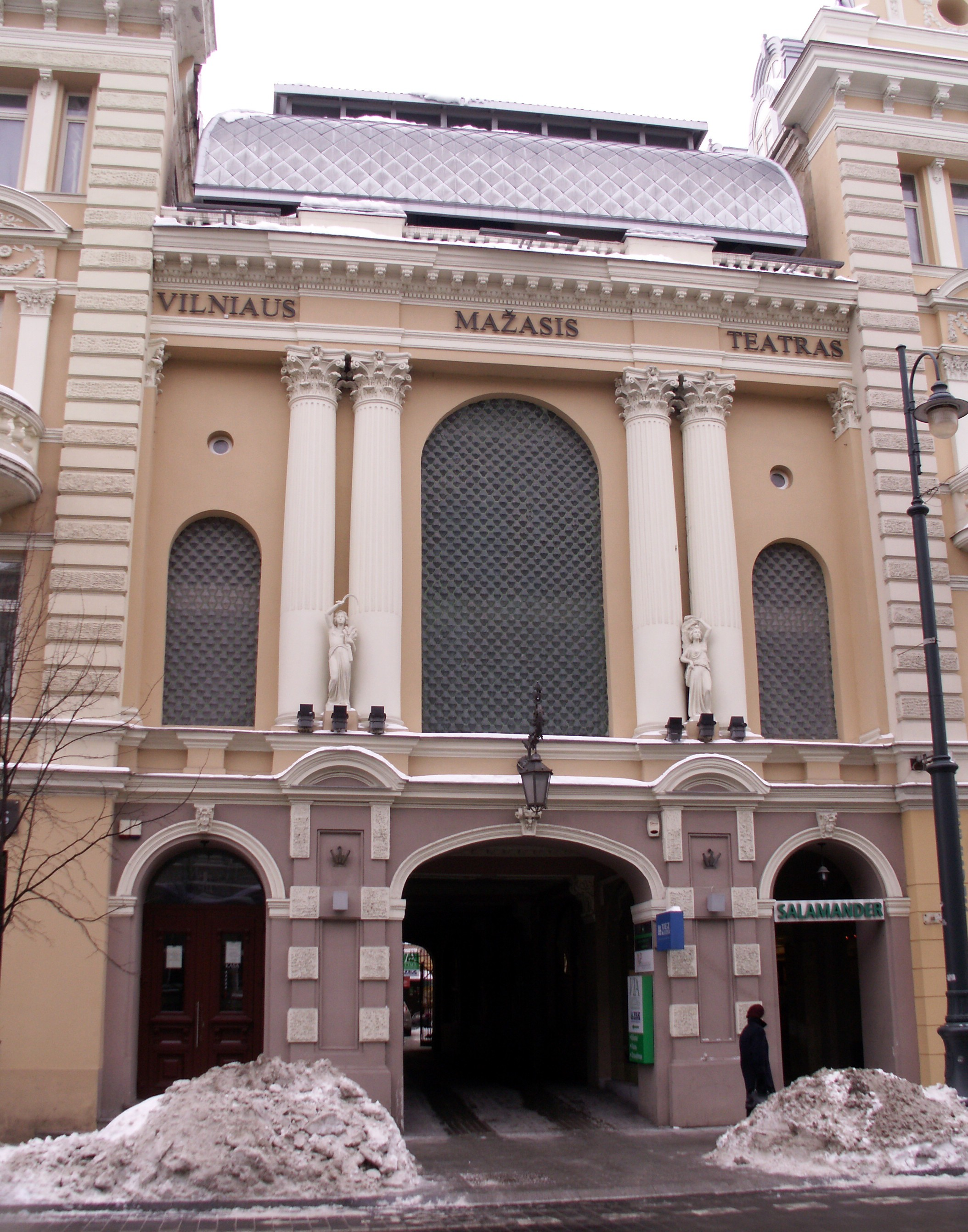
Former building of Rūta Society (now the State Small Theatre of Vilnius on the Gediminas Avenue)

Rūta Society (Lithuanian: Vilniaus lietuvių kultūros draugija „Rūta“) was a Lithuanian cultural society in Vilnius (Vilna, Wilno), then part of the Russian Empire, active from 1909 to the outbreak of World War I in 1914. It organized various events, including lectures, literary evenings, and musical performances, but it is most noted for its contribution to the development of the Lithuanian theater. In total, Rūta staged about 50 plays.

== History ==
The official permission to establish Rūta was received on 25 September 1908 and the founding meeting took place on 11 January 1909. At that time the society registered 66 members and elected a 12-member board, which included Jonas Masiulis (chairman), Andrius Domaševičius (vice-chairman), Mykolas Sleževičius (secretary), Donatas Malinauskas (treasurer), Jonas Basanavičius, and Jurgis Šlapelis. The membership dues were set at a minimum of four rubles per year. Sleževičius was the main driving force behind the society – he established a cultural society of the same name as a law student at the Odessa University. During the first year, the number of members grew to 192 and the society held 33 evenings (mostly dance) and four lectures. In 1910, the society organized 89 events.

The society had a group for singers, dancers, music players, and theater performers. Many of the performers were previously active with the Lithuanian Mutual Aid Society of Vilnius. Most performances were open to the public.

== Choir ==
The society had a choir (about 50 members) which performed works by Lithuanian composers (Mikalojus Konstantinas Čiurlionis, Juozas Naujalis, Mikas Petrauskas, Česlovas Sasnauskas, Stasys Šimkus) as well as foreign composers (Pyotr Ilyich Tchaikovsky, Robert Schumann, Jules Massenet). In 1910, a Latvian subsidiary of the Gramophone Company recorded Tautiška giesmė and eight other patriotic songs. The singers were little trained – their voices were loud but enthusiastic. Another recording of 20 songs by Lithuanian composers was made in 1914. Together with a symphonic orchestra, the choir performed cantata "De profundis" by Čiurlionis in 1913.

== Theater ==
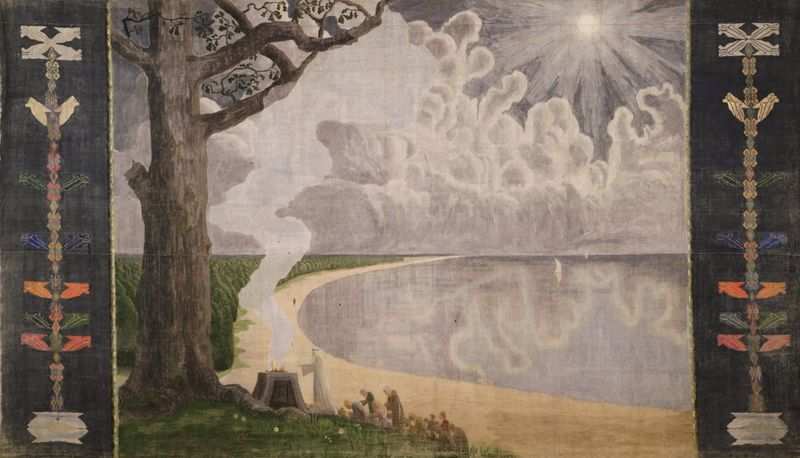
Backdrop painted by Čiurlionis

The theater group with Mykolas Sleževičius was particularly active. It also included Gabrielius Landsbergis-Žemkalnis, Antanas Žmuidzinavičius, and others. The backdrop was painted by Mikalojus Konstantinas Čiurlionis in June 1909. It has survived and is preserved at the M. K. Čiurlionis National Art Museum and commemorated by a fresco inside the former theater of Rūta. The group, which was active even before Rūta was officially organized, staged several plays, most notably historical dramas Mindaugis, Lietuvos karalius by Juliusz Słowacki (Mindaugas, King of Lithuania; premiered on 27 April 1908) and Živilė, duktė Karijoto by Vincas Nagornoskis (Živilė, Daughter of Karijotas; premiered on 4 January 1909). The plays had to be approved by Russian censors who diligently removed any anti-Russian sentiments. As a result, many plays were significantly cut. For example, Živilė, duktė Karijoto lost the entire first section and many scenes.

The theater shift from simple comedies to historical dramas revealed limitations of the amateur theater and the need of a professional Lithuanian theater. To that end, in September 1910, the theater group separated from Rūta and joined the theater group of the Lithuanian Mutual Aid Society of Vilnius to form an independent Lithuanian Artists' Union of Vilnius (Vilniaus lietuvių artistų sąjunga) which two years later established the first theater company. The union and the company closely cooperated with Rūta and staged many new plays. Lithuanian activists hoped that it would become the basis for the professional Lithuanian theater, but it faced financial difficulties and internal disagreements, paid no heed to theater education and hoped that practice would be enough. The last play, modernist The Snow by Stanisław Przybyszewski, was performed on 10 May 1914. Further activities were disrupted by World War I.
