= Antanas Vileišis =

Lithuanian doctor and activist

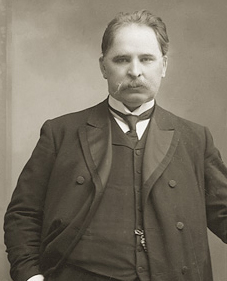
Antanas Vileišis

Dr. Antanas Vileišis (October 21, 1856 in Mediniai near Biržai – April 9, 1919 in Vilnius) was a Lithuanian public figure. After graduating from Moscow University in 1898, he settled in Vilnius and practiced medicine. He contributed to and distributed illegal Lithuanian press during the press ban imposed by the Tsarist authorities. In 1900, he married Emilija Vileišienė. After the ban was lifted in 1904, Vileišis was an active participant in various educational and cultural organizations, such as Rūta and Aušra. He authored numerous articles and brochures on hygiene and healthcare. He died in Vilnius in 1919 and was buried in Rasos Cemetery.
