= Donatas Malinauskas =

Lithuanian politician and diplomat

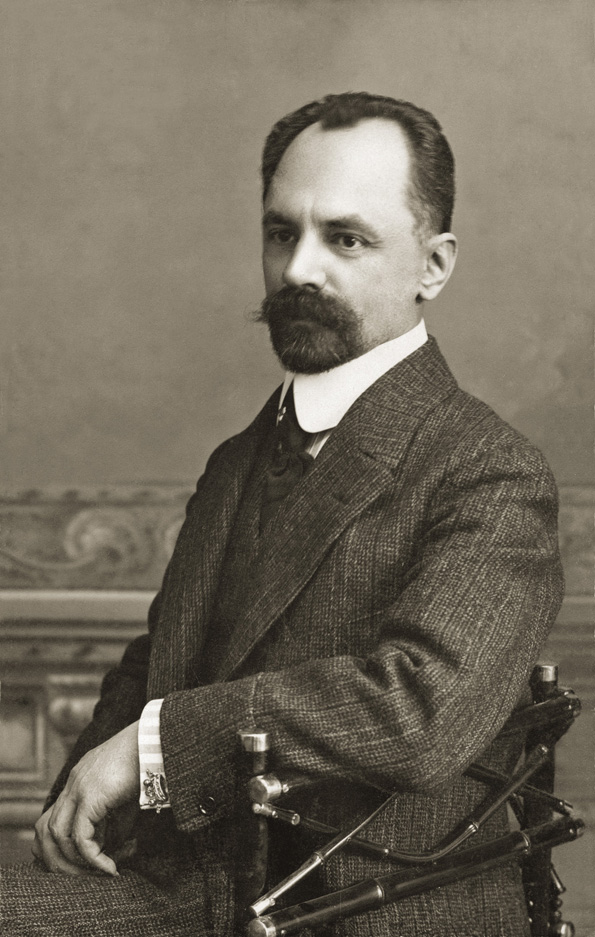
Donatas Malinauskas

Donatas Malinauskas (1877 in Krāslava, Latvia – November 30, 1942 in Altai Krai, Russia) was a Lithuanian politician and diplomat, and one of twenty signatories to the Act of Independence of Lithuania.

Malinauskas was born to a Lithuanian family of nobility and educated in Vilnius. Later he moved to study at the Agricultural Academy in Tabor, Bohemia, where he supported Czech nationalist movements among the student body.

After graduation, he returned to the family estate near Trakai and became involved with various political and charitable causes. He was part of a group known as the Twelve Apostles of Vilnius. Their objectives included a campaign to allow the use of the Lithuanian language in Roman Catholic services in Lithuania, which at the time required the use of either Latin or Polish, and the establishment of the Lithuanian Society for the Relief of War Sufferers. His work at this Committee led to his election to the Council of Lithuania and the signing of the Act of Independence in 1918.

During the Interwar period Malinauskas served as a diplomatic envoy to Czechoslovakia and Estonia. He conducted a search for the remains of Vytautas the Great, going so far as to have a silver coffin constructed in Czechoslovakia to contain these, if and when they were found. The search focused on Vilnius Cathedral, which most historic sources pointed to as the most probable location.

Malinauskas was deported to Russia on June 14, 1941. His remains were returned to Lithuania in 1993.
