= Lithuanian Women's Council =

The Lithuanian Women's Council (Lithuanian: Lietuvos moterų taryba) or LMT was an umbrella organization of various women's societies and organizations in interwar Lithuania. Established in 1929, it represented democratic and social-democratic ideas, as women Catholics had their own umbrella organization, established in 1922. LMT became a member of the International Council of Women and represented Lithuania in various international congresses. The council was financed by the government and included many wives of politicians of the authoritarian regime of President Antanas Smetona. As such, it did not actively protest government policies even if they were detrimental to women. The most significant political victory of LMT was prohibition of prostitution in 1935. The organization was dissolved after the occupation of Lithuania by the Soviet Union in June 1940.

== History ==
=== Establishment ===
In the early 1920s, there was an increasing number of various committees, societies, and organizations seeking to aid women and orphans, improve morale, and provide education. There was a need to unite and better coordinate their efforts. The idea of an umbrella organization was raised by Gabrielė Petkevičaitė-Bitė in September 1927. A year later, Louise van Eeghen of the International Council of Women visited Lithuania and encouraged women to join the international movement. The organizational committee was established on 16 September 1928 and included Ona Mašiotienė, Jadvyga Tūbelienė, Felicija Bortkevičienė, Paulina Kalvaitytė. The first organizational meeting took place on 9 December 1928. It was attended by representatives of 14 organizations, including the Society of Lithuanian Catholic Women. The meeting failed to establish the LMT and the second organizational meeting took place on 17 February 1929. This time 17 organizations participated, but not the Society of Lithuanian Catholic Women (in 1933 it had more than 30,000 members – more than all members of LMT combined). The meeting adopted LMT statute which stated that LMT was a cultural and not a political organization. The meeting also elected an 8-member board chaired by Ona Mašiotienė.

=== Political activities ===
LMT asked Prime Minister Juozas Tūbelis (husband of Jadvyga Tūbelienė) for financial support and received it. This allowed the authoritarian regime of President Antanas Smetona to influence and control activities of LMT, which would send protest notes and petitions but would not take more active measures. The government pushed women to "return home" and away from politics and job markets, particularly during the Great Depression. In 1935, when Kaunas city decided to terminate all women doctors, the Union of the Lithuanian Women with Higher Education (Lietuvos moterų, baigusių aukštąjį mokslą, sąjunga) complained to the International Federation of University Women which forwarded it to the League of Nations. The complaint was included in a report on women's rights in 23 countries presented to the League during its 16th assembly in September 1935, but the League passed no resolutions. LMT decided to encourage handicrafts, small businesses, and cooperatives.

LMT took up prostitution as one of its most important issues and managed to achieve its prohibition in 1935; it was its greatest political achievement. LMT tried, but failed, to gain seats in the government institutions. In late 1929, LMT requested President Smetona to co-opt representatives of women organizations to the president-appointed State Council, an advisory legislative body established by the Constitution of 1928. The President tentatively agreed and asked for a list of candidates, but the plan failed due to ideological disagreements between LMT and the Lithuanian Women's Union, supported by the Social Democratic Party of Lithuania.

In 1929, the government adopted a new law on municipal elections to increase its influence in the local government. The law restricted voting rights to those who owned property and paid taxes. That eliminated a good number of women and their share in the electorate dropped to about one-third. In 1936, new elections to Seimas were held and LMT sought to register women candidates, but managed to register only Eugenija Čepulytė-Klupšienė (1897–1989) in Šiauliai. She lost and LMT blamed electoral fraud but its complaints went unanswered. It was the first parliament without women representatives since the declaration of independence in 1918.

=== Other activities ===
The failure in the 1936 parliamentary elections prompted LMT to organize the second Congress of Lithuanian Women in December 1937. The occasion also coincided with the 30th anniversary of the first congress. The meeting was attended by about 1,000 women representing 30 different organizations. These were mostly ladies from cities as women from rural communities were not specifically invited. President Smetona delivered an opening speech in which he thanked the women for their part in establishing independent Lithuania but stated that a woman's true calling was not in politics or public life, but at home. During the congress, women presented various reports or proposals on topics ranging from women's role in a family to women's role in national defense, but there were no discussions or resolutions. The conference ended with a list of declarative suggestions to the public and the women.

LMT was an organization of well-educated ladies working in professional jobs, lacking representatives of rural farmers or factory workers. Therefore, LMT organized events and campaigns aimed at the intelligentsia or charitable causes. For example, it established a social club for women (Moterų seklyčia) with a kids' playroom in 1933, gathered funds to help victims of a flood in 1936, and organized a theater performance for poor women on Mother's Day in 1937. From March 1937, LMT published an illustrated monthly magazine Moteris ir pasaulis (Woman and the World), edited by Pranciška Pikčilingienė.

LMT joined international organizations, including the International Council of Women and Women's International League for Peace and Freedom. Representatives of LMT participated in the congresses of the International Council of Women in Vienna in May 1930 and in Dubrovnik in September 1936. The council attended other international events, such as the Fifth International Congress of Home Economics organized by the International Commission on Family Education in Berlin in August 1934 and the International Congress of the Christian Family in Paris in June 1937. In 1936, an idea was raised to united women's movement in the Baltic states, but it did not proceed further.

== Chairwomen ==
LMT was chaired by:

- Ona Mašiotienė (1929–1934)
- Bronislava Biržiškienė (1934), wife of Mykolas Biržiška
- Vincenta Lozoraitienė, wife of Stasys Lozoraitis
