= Gabrielė Petkevičaitė-Bitė =

Lithuanian writer and activist

Gabrielė Petkevičaitė
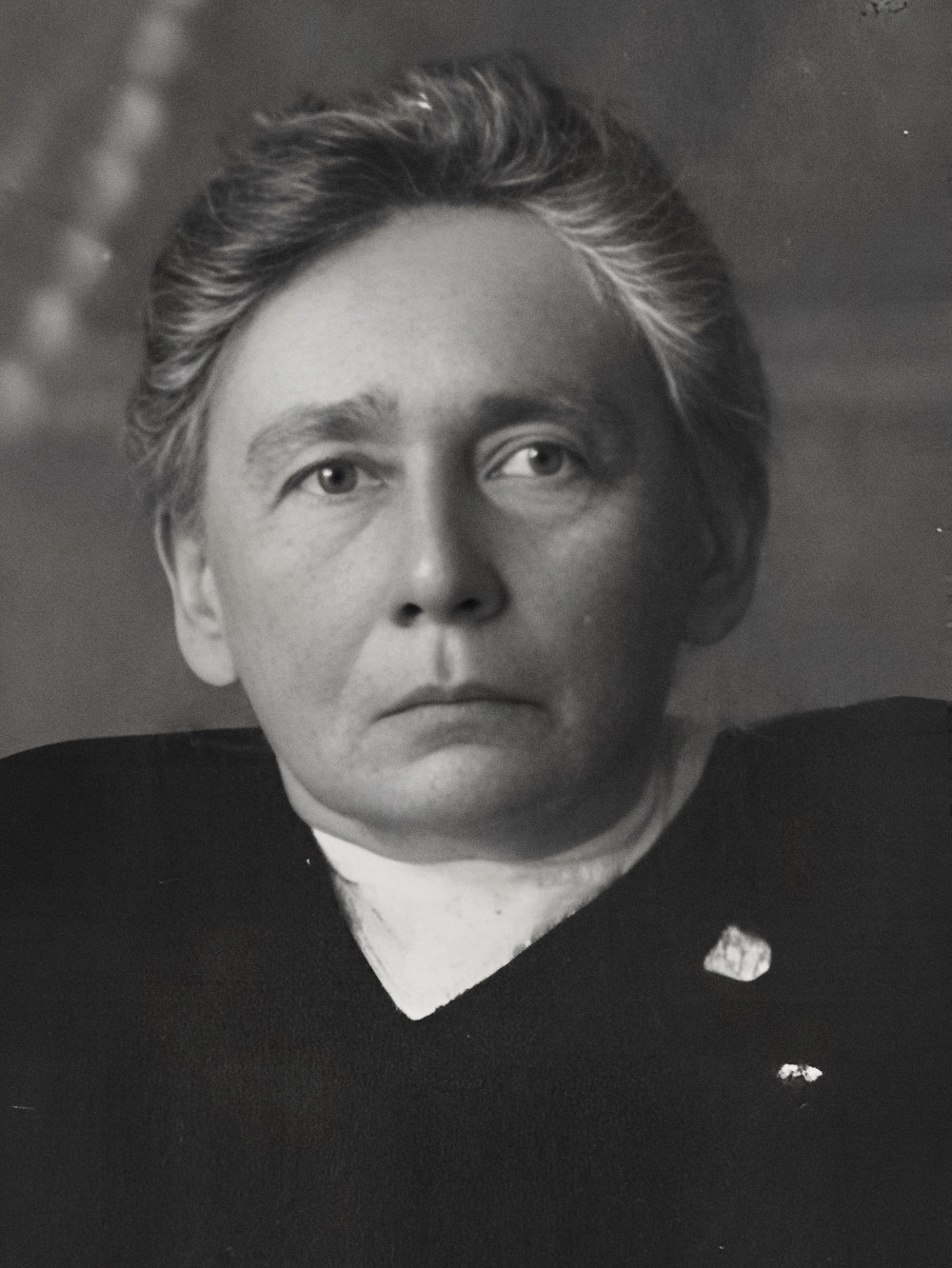
- Petkevičaitė-Bitė in 1920

Acting Speaker of the Constituent Assembly of Lithuania
- In office 15 May 1920 – 15 May 1920
- Preceded by: Post created
- Succeeded by: Aleksandras Stulginskis

Member of the Constituent Assembly of Lithuania
- In office 15 May 1920 – 15 September 1920

Personal details
- Born: March 18, 1861 Puziniškis, Kovno Governorate, Russian Empire
- Died: June 14, 1943 (aged 82) Panevėžys, Reichskommissariat Ostland, Nazi Germany
- Party: Lithuanian Popular Peasants' Union
- Relations: Cousin Sofija Smetonienė
- Occupation: Teacher, writer
- Awards: Order of the Lithuanian Grand Duke Gediminas (1929, 1936)

Gabrielė Petkevičaitė (18 March 1861 – 14 June 1943) was a Lithuanian educator, writer, and activist. Her pen name Bitė (Bee) eventually became part of her last name. Encouraged by Povilas Višinskis, she joined public life and started her writing career in 1890, becoming a prominent member of the Lithuanian National Revival. She was the founder and chair of the Žiburėlis society to provide financial aid to struggling students, one of the editors of the newspaper Lietuvos žinios, and an active member of the women's movement. In 1920, she was elected to the Constituent Assembly of Lithuania and chaired its first session. Her realist writing centered on exploring the negative impact of the social inequality. Her largest work, two-part novel Ad astra (1933), depicts the rising Lithuanian National Revival. Together with Žemaitė, she co-wrote several plays. Her diary, kept during World War I, was published in 1925–1931 and 2008–2011.

== Biography ==
=== Early life and education ===
Petkevičaitė was born in Puziniškis Manor, Panevėžys district to a family of Lithuanian nobility. Her father, a graduate of Kiev University, was a doctor and became director of a hospital in Joniškėlis. He sympathized with Russian Narodniks who emphasized service to the common folk. When she was nine, Petkevičaitė's mother died of typhus and as the eldest child she began looking after her five brothers despite her own disability (deformed spine). Duty and service to others continued to be a prominent part of Petkevičaitė's life and work. She received education at home from Laurynas Ivinskis (in 1866–1868) and other private tutors. After graduation from a private girls' school in Jelgava (Dorotheen-Töchterschule) in 1878, Petkevičaitė worked with her father in a pharmacy and privately tutored in Lithuanian, violating the Lithuanian press ban. She wanted to continue her education and study mathematics at a university, but her father would not allow it and she felt trapped in the provincial life by her family duties and management of the manor. She completed beekeeping courses in Deltuva in 1885 and even wrote a booklet on beekeeping in 1889, but it was not published. In February 1885, she became the godmother of her cousin, Sofija Chodakauskaitė.

=== Public work in Russian Empire ===
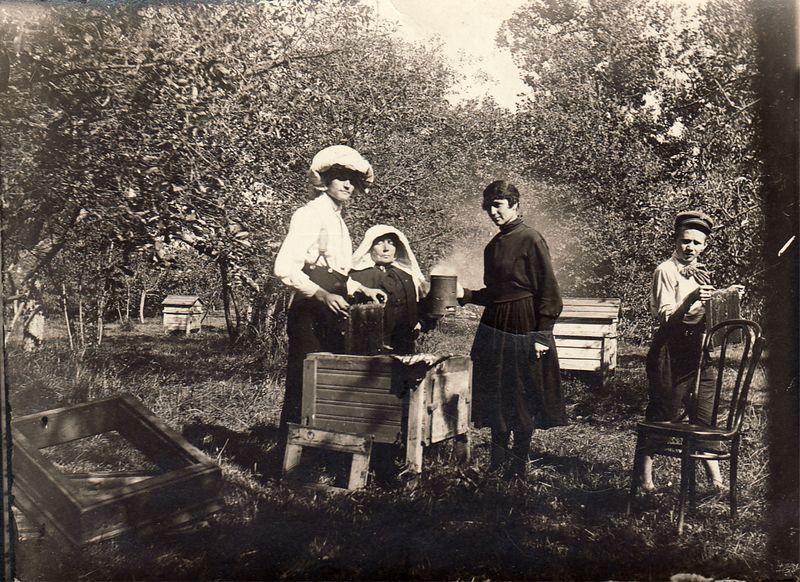
Petkevičaitė-Bitė in her apiary in the 1910s

Her first article was published in Varpas in 1892 and dealt with women's issues. In 1893, she established the Žiburėlis society to provide financial aid to struggling students and became its driving force. In 1894, she met Povilas Višinskis who gave her Piršlybos (The Proposal), the first manuscript by Žemaitė. The work was edited by Jonas Jablonskis for grammar and spelling and published launching Žemaitė's literary career. Together with Višinskis she staged the first legal Lithuanian-language theater performance. The simple comedy, America in the Bathhouse, was performed in August 1899 in Palanga. After the death of Vincas Kudirka, she edited a regular column in Varpas. She was also a member of the Imperial Russian Geographical Society and contributed articles on ethnographic topics to its publications.

In 1905, she attended the Great Seimas of Vilnius which resolved to demand wide political autonomy for Lithuania within the Russian Empire. She was one of the organizers and chairwoman of the First Congress of Lithuanian Women in 1907 and helped organizing the Lithuanian Women's Union. Petkevičaitė and other more liberal activists' conflict with Lithuanian clergy led to the creation of the separate Catholic-minded Lithuanian Catholic Women's Organization. In December 1908, together with Žemaitė, she participated in the First All-Russian Women's Congress the held by the League for Women's Equality. She read a report on Lithuanian women in family and public life, in villages and cities. The expanded report was published in Lithuania in 1910. In June 1911, she attended the Sixth Conference of the International Woman Suffrage Alliance in Stockholm.

After her father's death in 1909, she lived in Vilnius but family duties followed her – she had to take care of her three nephews and an orphan that her family informally adopted. In Vilnius, she worked as editorial staff of Lietuvos žinios. In 1911–1912, she was the editor of Žibutė, a liberal supplement to Lietuvos ūkininkas that was geared towards the women. Žibutė encouraged women to seek education and be active in social and political life. It was a liberal answer to the Catholic Lietuvaitė, which supported the traditional role of a woman as a housekeeper and published articles on proper women's etiquette and culinary recipes. In total, she wrote some 400 articles to various newspapers. During World War I, Petkevičaitė returned to her childhood home. She completed courses for doctor's assistant and, according to her father's wishes, helped the sick. During the war she kept a diary, which was first published in 1925 and 1933. In the diary, she expressed support to Hugo Haase and Social Democratic Party of Germany.

=== Public work in independent Lithuania ===
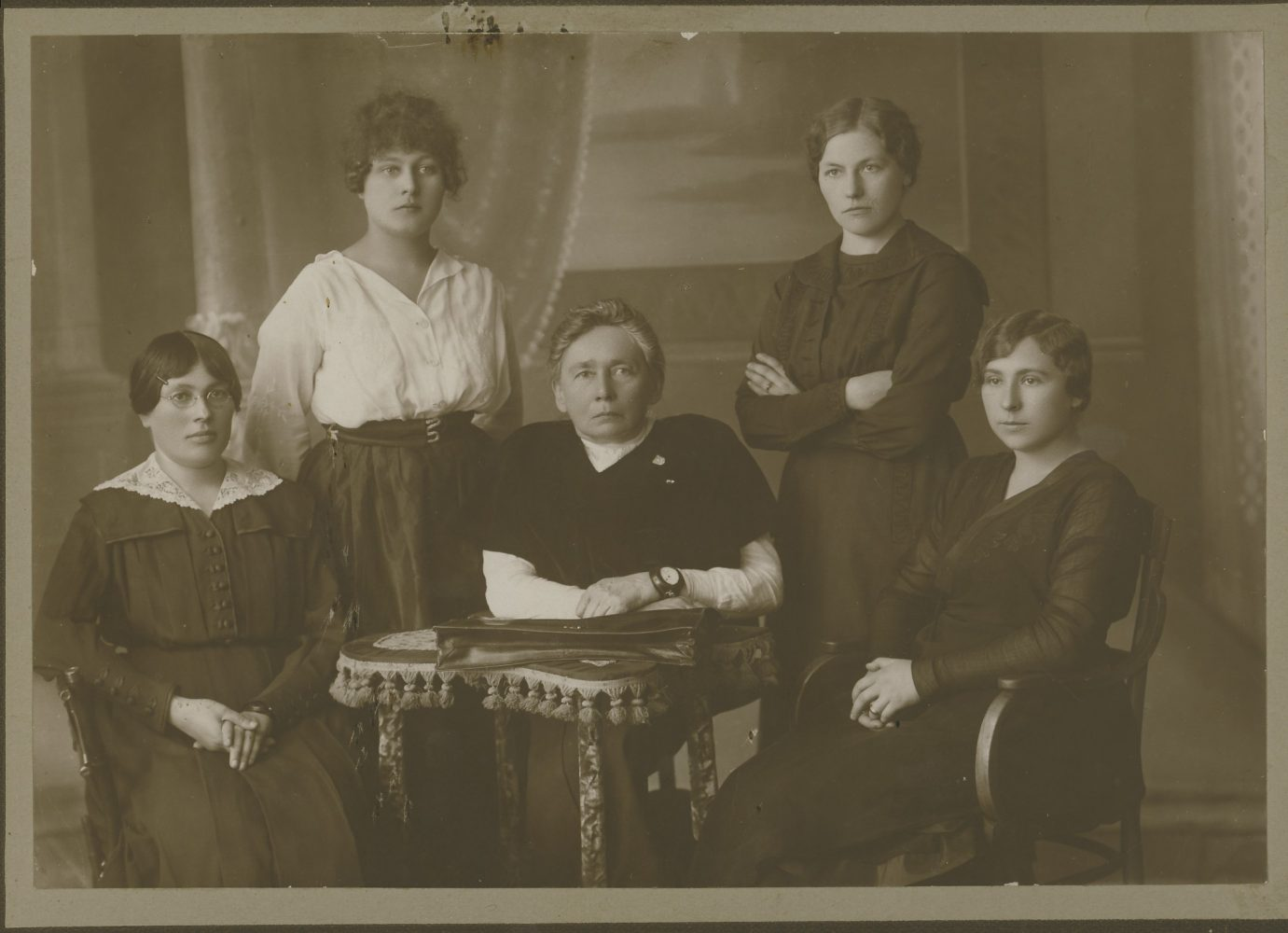
Petkevičaitė-Bitė (center) with other women delegates of the Constituent Assembly of Lithuania

In May 1920, she was elected to the Constituent Assembly of Lithuania and, as the second oldest member of the assembly (the oldest, Simon Yakovlevich Rosenbaum, did not speak Lithuanian), presided over its first session before a chairman was elected. However, she resigned just four months later. In June 1920, she attended the Eighth Conference of the International Woman Suffrage Alliance in Geneva. In 1919, by invitation of Juozas Balčikonis, she began teaching at the Panevėžys Gymnasium. She taught Lithuanian language, literature, ancient history as well as Polish and German languages. Together with Juozas Zikaras, Petkevičaitė designed a school uniform for girls, which was soon adopted nationally and discontinued only around 1990. Her classroom notes on world literature were developed and published in 1922 and 1924 as a two-volume school textbook.

In 1924, Petkevičaitė resigned from her teaching position due to poor health. She then largely retired from public life, but continued to write. In 1926 she was a candidate in the 1926 Lithuanian presidential election, held by the Seimas on 7 June 1926, where she received one vote - sharing third place with the other female candidate Felicija Bortkevičienė. In 1927, she proposed to create the Lithuanian Women's Council, an umbrella organization united all women organizations in Lithuania. In recognition of her achievements, she was awarded the Order of the Lithuanian Grand Duke Gediminas twice, in 1929 and 1936. She died in 1943 in Panevėžys. Her house was turned into a memorial museum in 1968, but it was closed in 2010. Her memorial medal, awarded annually for distinguished public and cultural work, was established by the Seimas (parliament of Lithuania) in 2011.

== Writing career ==
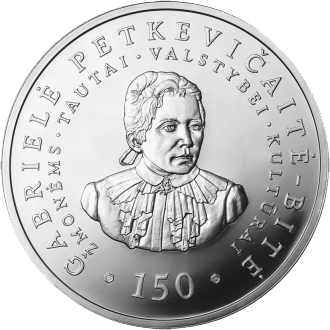
50 litas commemorative coin (2011). Inscription reads: For people, nation, state, culture.

Petkevičaitė began contributing news stories to Varpas in 1890 (after reading a complaint from Vincas Kudirka that the newspaper lacked correspondents). Her first fiction was published in periodicals (1894) and later as stand-alone works (1900). Her writing centered on social inequality and belonged to the literary realism movement. She saw inequality as the cause of economic suffering and moral decline, but believed that the rise of humanism would alleviate the misery. Petkevičaitė often contrasted harmony found in natural world with dysfunctional social classes. Short story Dievui atkišus (Offering it to God) about a girl seduced by a landowner is one of the most powerful social commentaries. Her two-part novel Ad astra (1933) depicted the rise of national consciousness during the Lithuanian National Revival, but was not well received by critics due to its sentimental tone and bland characterizations. Her diary, written during World War I, expressed her desire for beauty, peace, and ideal humanity. The diary is a good example of romantic attempts to escape from daily misery into the perfect word of nature and arts.

In 1899, Petkevičaitė co-directed with Povilas Višinskis the first Lithuanian-language play America in the Bathhouse (Amerika pirtyje) in Palanga. Encouraged by the success, Petkevičaitė joined forces with another female writer Žemaitė and wrote several plays under the joint pen name Dvi Moteri (Two Women), including Velnias spąstuose (The Devil in a Trap, 1902), Kaip kas išmano, taip save gano (Each on His Own, 1904), Parduotoji laimė (Sold Happiness, 1905), Dublynė (The Bog, 1912), and others.
