= Lithuanian Women's Union =

Former women's organization

The Lithuanian Women's Union (Lithuanian: Lietuvos moterų sąjunga or LMS) was a women's organization active in Lithuania from 1922 to 1933. The First Congress of Lithuanian Women held in 1907 called for the establishment of the union, but it was not accomplished due to conflicts between Catholic clergy and socialists. The union was officially established in 1922 and initially chaired by Felicija Bortkevičienė. The union was supported by the Social Democratic Party of Lithuania and the Peasant Union, opponents of the authoritarian President Antanas Smetona who came to power in 1926. Therefore, it was in opposition to the government-sponsored Lithuanian Women's Council. The union was officially closed on 10 June 1935.

== Proposed organization in 1907–1908 ==
The First Congress of Lithuanian Women held in October 1907 in Kaunas (then part of the Russian Empire) resolved to establish the Lithuanian Women's Union which would participate in the international women's movement. After contentious debates between Catholic clergy and socialists, the congress elected a 10-member committee to organize the union. The committee included Gabrielė Petkevičaitė as chair, Sofija Kymantaitė-Čiurlionienė and Marija Pečkauskaitė as vice-chairs, Ona Pleirytė-Puidienė and Marija Putvinskaitė-Žmuidzinavičienė as secretaries, Celina Leonienė and Kotryna Norkytė as treasurers, and Joana Griniuvienė, Elena Vaitkevičienė, and Teklė Augustinavičiūtė as members of the revision sub-committee. Several other women, including Felicija Bortkevičienė and Julija Žymantienė, were selected as candidates in case of any resignations.

The committee, particularly Kymantaitė-Čiurlionienė and Pleirytė-Puidienė, started working on the statute of the planned union by copying the statute of the Russian Union for Women's Equality. In November, the statute was submitted to the Governor-General of Vilna for approval, but it was rejected. The Catholics protested this statute as they wanted to copy examples of organizations of Belgian and German Catholic women, not Russian liberals. After a failed attempt to find a compromise in December 1907, the Catholic camp established the Association of Lithuanian Catholic Women in January 1908. The Catholic association was approved by Kovno Governorate. The Tsarist authorities would not approve another women's organization thus effectively preventing the Lithuanian Women's Union from being organized.

However, the union continued to function illegally. In 1908, Gabrielė Petkevičaitė and Julija Žymantienė attended the First All-Russian Women's Congress organized by the League for Women's Equality. In 1911, the liberal members of the women's movement established Žibutė (Violet), a supplement to the Lithuanian weekly Lietuvos ūkininkas on the women's issues. However, it was discontinued after eight issues in 1913. The women debated and rejected the idea of establishing a separate women's political party as it would have weakened the Social Democratic Party of Lithuania and the Lithuanian Democratic Party.

== Organization in 1922–1935 ==
The Women's Union was officially established only after Lithuania gained independence in 1918. Its establishment was related to the October 1922 elections to the First Seimas of Lithuania. The organizational meeting took place on 17 August 1922 in Kaunas and elected Felicija Bortkevičienė as the chair. The meeting resolved to unite women regardless of their profession or social status and foster Lithuanian traditions and Catholic morals. In particular, the union would work on improving education and public health, promote teetotalism, advocate for women's rights, encourage unity and solidarity among women, aid moral and physical education of Lithuanian youth. A month later, the union resolved to unite all progressive women who did not belong to the Association of Lithuanian Catholic Women. However, without financial support from either the government or the political parties (it was otherwise supported by the Social Democratic Party of Lithuania and the Peasant Union), the union could not compete with the much larger and more influential Catholic association.

The union established chapters across Lithuania; the first were established in the districts of Šilalė, Tauragė, Raseiniai, Šiauliai, Telšiai, Plungė, Mažeikiai, and Alytus. The union established its own column Moters gyvenimas (Life of a Woman) in Lietuvos žinios which regularly published news about its activities. The union became more active in 1926. The union organized several protest meetings against a decision of 3 November 1926 by the Council of Ministers to dismiss wives of government officials if both spouses worked for the government. The union sent a delegation to President Kazys Grinius with demands to cancel the decision. Due to protests, the decision was withdrawn.

The union became less active after the December 1926 coup d'état that brought President Antanas Smetona to power. During a general meeting on 25 May 1928, the union was accused of inactivity and inaction. Ona Mašiotienė suggested to change the focus from political agitation to cultural work. A new board was elected in December 1928. In late 1929 and early 1930, the union was in opposition to the government-sponsored Lithuanian Women's Council and derailed plans to include at least one woman in the State Council of Lithuania. The union was inactive from 1933 and was officially closed on 10 June 1935.

== Chairs ==
The union was chaired by:

- Felicija Bortkevičienė (1922–1929, 1933)
- Gabrielė Petkevičaitė-Bitė (1929–1930)
- Elena Baronienė (1930–1933)
