= Ona Mašiotienė =

Lithuanian women's rights activist

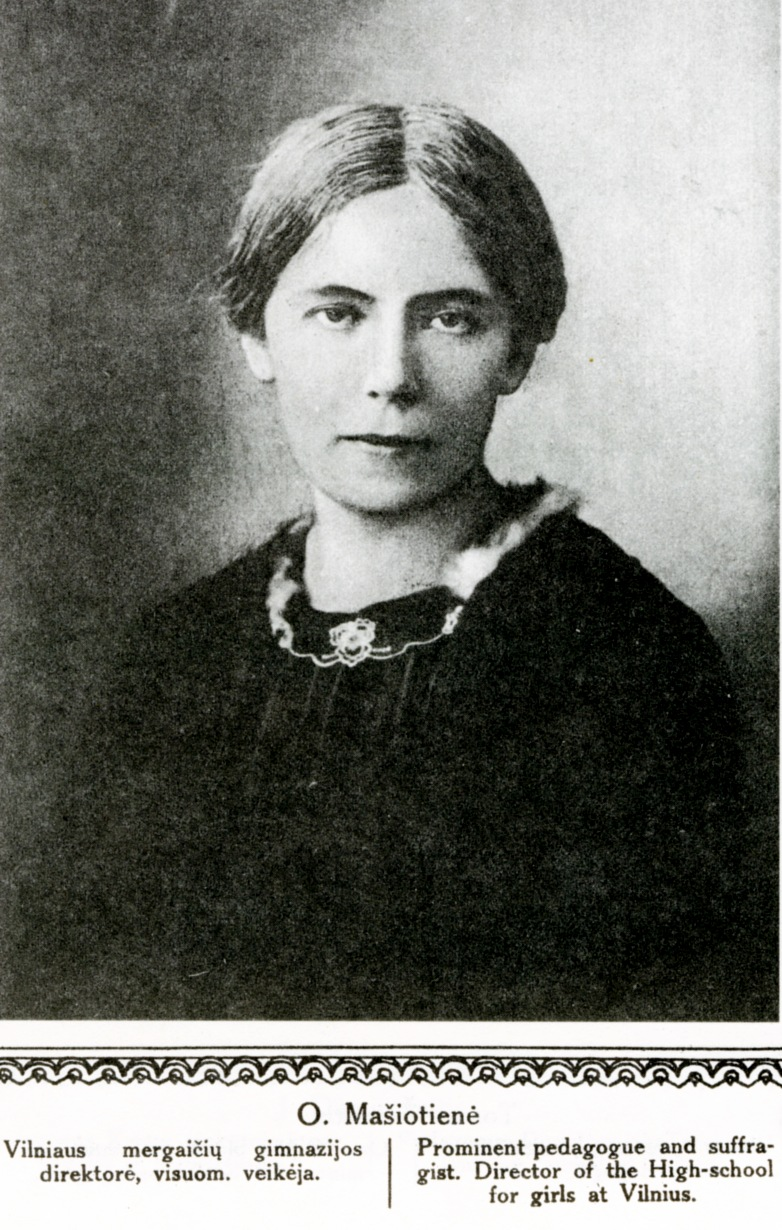
- Born: Ona Brazauskaitė; 9 September 1883; Šlavėnai, Anykščiai Parish, Russian Empire
- Died: 29 December 1949 (aged 66); Kaunas, Lithuanian Soviet Socialist Republic
- Resting place: Petrašiūnai Cemetery
- Other name: Ona Brazauskaitė-Mašiotienė
- Education: Moscow Higher Courses for Women
- Occupations: teacher, women's rights activist, writer
- Years active: 1904–1940

Ona Mašiotienė née Brazauskaitė (Polish: Anna Brzozowska; 9 September 1883 – 29 December 1949) was a Lithuanian teacher and principal, women's rights activist and writer. She helped found the Lithuanian Women's Association, the first women's rights organization in the country, and lectured on the need for equality of men and women. Pressing for both women's rights and Lithuania's independence, she served as a member of different societies and a delegate to several political conferences and assemblies. As a teacher, she organized the first Lithuanian-language girls' gymnasium in Vilnius and was the principal of a secondary school in Kaunas for over a decade. In 1921, she was elected to serve on the Utena regional council for two terms. She was one of the co-founders and the first president of the umbrella Lithuanian Women's Council. Recognized by the independent Lithuanian government with national awards, she was dismissed from her teaching post after the Soviets reestablished authority over the country.

== Early life ==
Ona Brazauskaitė was born on 9 September 1883 in the village of Šlavėnai in the Anykščiai Parish of the Russian Empire to Jadwiga (née Michalowska, also known as Jadvyga Mikalauskaitė) and Gustavas Brazauskas (Gustaw Brzezowski). Her parents met when Brazauskas was imprisoned for his participation in the 1863 uprising against Russian rule with Jadwiga's father. Of noble heritage, her family of eight children spoke Polish at home but were divided on whether they identified as Lithuanian or Polish. Brazauskas advocated for a unified Lithuanian and Polish state and distributed books in the Lithuanian language, a banned activity at the time.

Graduating with distinction from Kaunas Girls' High School around 1900, Brazauskaitė decided to further her studies to become a teacher. Her parents, though able to afford her education, did not approve of women's higher education, but an aunt stepped in to finance Brazauskaitė in continuing her studies in Moscow. She enrolled in natural sciences courses at the Moscow Higher Courses for Women. While she was studying, she helped establish the Lithuanian Student Society of Moscow and became interested in the women's movements ongoing in Western Europe. Becoming an advocate for women's rights, she was one of the founders of the first women's organization of Lithuania, the Lithuanian Women's Association (Lithuanian: Lietuvos moterų susivienijimas), in September 1905. Elected as a delegate to the second Congress of the All-Russian Union for Women's Equality, held in October, Brazauskaitė attended the meeting before returning to Lithuania to participate in the Great Seimas of Vilnius held in December.

After the assembly was held, women leaders met on the Okulič estate in Latavėnai to organize women to fight against the tsarist autocracy. Brazauskaitė called for the women to press for their human rights and equality, and the right of their children to be educated and trained in the Lithuanian language. Shortly thereafter, probably in 1906–1907, she married Jonas Mašiotas, brother of writer Pranas Mašiotas and a Lithuanian student she had met while studying in Moscow. She helped prepare for the First Lithuanian Women's Congress held on 27 and 28 September 1907 in Kaunas and then moved to Vilnius, where she helped organize the Lithuanian Women's Union (Lithuanian: Lietuvos moterų sąjungą). In 1909, she gave birth to her only child, a daughter Ona.

== Career ==
Between 1911 and 1914, Mašiotienė worked as a high school teacher in Vilnius, but with the advent of World War I the young family fled to Moscow. She organized the Lithuanian Women's Freedom Union and became its chair, serving in 1917 as the organization's spokesperson at the Lithuanian Assembly held in Saint Petersburg. She spoke at the conference on women's rights. However, the Freedom Union did not gain traction and was short-lived.

After Lithuania declared its independence in 1918, Mašiotienė returned to Vilnius with her family. She established and directed the first girls' gymnasium in the Lithuanian language there and held evening courses in Russian, to help those who had begun their studies in that language complete their schooling. The school was closed by the Polish officials during the Polish–Lithuanian War in 1919. That same year, she was elected to serve on the board of the Lithuanian Teachers' Union and the Temporary Committee of Lithuanians in Vilnius. The latter organization focused on promoting Lithuanian culture and Mašiotienė worked for national independence by rallying popular support. She urged women to become involved in war work and national defense.

In 1921, as a board member of the Lithuanian Women's Union, Mašiotienė was elected to serve on the Utena regional council, which was the county in which her estate in the village of Šlavėnai was located. Under the land reforms passed the following year, her ancestral estate was halved and she was left with only 80 hectares (200 acres) of land, which she continued to use as a summer estate. For the remaining part of the year, Mašiotienė and her family lived in Kaunas, where she taught natural sciences in the areas' secondary schools. She was re-elected to the regional council in 1924 and served a four-year term.

In 1928, Mašiotienė became the principal of the Kaunas 2nd Secondary School. That same year, soon after a visit in September by Louise C. A. van Eeghen, a board member of the International Council of Women (ICW), she also co-founded the Lithuanian Women's Council (Lithuanian: Lietuvos moterų taryba (LMT)). It was an umbrella organization uniting 17 women's organizations. Almost as soon as the LMT was founded, the organization joined the ICW as an affiliate member. In 1929, Mašiotienė attended the ICW Congress in London. She was elected to serve on the LMT board and was its president until 1934.

Mašiotienė became involved in a children's health initiative called Pieno lašas (milk drop) and began hosting radio shows in 1930. The first one, which focused on household tips and health issues was billed as The Conversations of Ann and Marian (Lithuanian: Onos ir Marijonos pasikalbėjimai). That same year, her public works were recognized by the state, when she was awarded the Order of the Lithuanian Grand Duke Gediminas in the Third Degree and the Order of Vytautas the Great in the First Degree. She worked on a radio news program Home and Woman (Lithuanian: Namai ir moteris), which began airing in 1933 and contributed articles to such publications as Lietuvos aidas, Lietuvos žinios, Žibutė, Moteris ir pasaulis and others. In 1937, at the Congress organized to commemorate the First Congress held in 1907, Mašiotienė presented a paper, The Political and National Work of Women from 1907 to 1937, which was published as a book the following year.

World War II brought significant changes to Mašiotienė's life. Her daughter left the country in 1944, moving to Australia. She was banned from teaching, and though she was allowed to live on her estate, she and her husband had to volunteer to participate in a kolkhoz, a Soviet agricultural collective. Her husband died in 1948, leaving Mašiotienė in a precarious state with little food or firewood. Mašiotienė died on 29 December 1949, at age 66, in a hospital in Kaunas and was buried in the Petrašiūnai Cemetery.
