= Lithuanian Women's Association =

The Lithuanian Women's Association (Lithuanian: Lietuvos moterų susivienijimas) was the first Lithuanian women's organization. It was active during the Russian Revolution of 1905 and campaigned for women's suffrage and for autonomy of Lithuania within the Russian Empire.

== Establishment ==
In the context of the revolution, Lithuanian women became more active. Both Lithuanian political parties, Social Democratic Party of Lithuania and Lithuanian Democratic Party, supported women's suffrage and had women members. On 13 June 1905, about 50 women gathered in Zubovai Palace in Šiauliai to discuss women's situation in Lithuania. They discussed women's movements in Poland and Russia and debated whether to join them or create a separate organization. They did not reach a decision and established only an information center which was to gather and disseminate information on women's movements abroad.

On 6 August 1905, the election law was passed in preparation for the legislative election to the newly established Russian State Duma. The voting rights were given only to males of certain wealth. In response, women of different nationalities (Lithuanian, Polish, Jewish) gathered in Vilnius to create an alternative election law and present it to Tsar Nicholas II of Russia. However, due to political disagreements over the autonomy for Lithuania, the gathering ended without a joint resolution. Each nationality created their own resolution. The Lithuanians gathered 230 signatures in support of their project, sent it to the Russian Union for Women's Equality, and were invited to the All-Russian Women's Congress. All these events necessitated establishment of a Lithuanian women's organization.

The Lithuanian Women's Association was established on 22–23 September 1905 in Vilnius. The elected board included Felicija Bortkevičienė, Ona Pleirytė-Puidienė, and Stanislava Landsbergaitė (eldest daughter of Gabrielius Landsbergis-Žemkalnis). The meeting adopted Association's program, which called for:

1. autonomy for Lithuania within its ethnographic borders with a parliament (Seimas) elected via universal, equal, secret, and direct elections (almost exactly the same demand was passed by the Great Seimas of Vilnius in December 1905)
2. equal rights for men and women
3. open membership (i.e. both men and women were welcome)

However, the association was not a legal organization as it was not registered with the Tsarist authorities.

== Activities ==
In its program, the association listed several goals and ways to reach them. It wanted to prepare responses to theoretical questions on gender equality, develop political consciousness of the society in general and women in particular, agitate for equal rights via books, brochures, articles, lectures and other methods both in urban and rural areas, provide assistance to women seeking professional education, seek improvements in working women's conditions, establish professional associations of women. It also sought to include a discussion of Lithuanian issues in school curriculum. The association established a number of small groups across the country where it was competing with the Polish women's movement and thus had to advocate not only for women's issues but for Lithuanian issues as well.

On 25 September 1905, the association organized a meeting of various women activists in Vilnius. The goal was to familiarize with the various initiatives and discuss the upcoming elections to State Duma. It was attended by representatives from Polish and Jewish groups as well as groups from other cities. The gathering decided to boycott the election and urge voters to demand autonomy for Lithuania and a Seimas elected via universal, equal, secret, and direct elections. On 28 September the proclamation was translated in three languages and distributed in Vilnius.

Although there was no separate women's group at the Great Seimas of Vilnius on 4–5 December 1905, the Seimas was attended by several women and Ona Brazauskaitė-Mašiotienė presented on the principles of equal rights that should govern in Lithuania. Shortly after the Seimas, the Lithuanian Women's Association organized a gathering of peasant women in Latavėnai Manor (Anykščiai District Municipality). The women agreed to seek human rights, equal rights with men, and children education in the Lithuanian language. In Vilnius, about 200 women attended a protest organized by the Union of Railroad Workers. The home of protest's secretary, Felicija Bortkevičienė, was searched by the Tsarist police. This and other repressions dampened revolutionary moods and activities of various organizations, but Lithuanian women continued to join the Russian Union for Women's Equality in its petitions for women's suffrage.

On 23–24 September 1907, Lithuanian Catholic priests organized the First Congress of Lithuanian Women in Kaunas. The congress decided to establish the Lithuanian Women's Union, but women Catholics did not want to join the same organization with social democrats. Therefore, they established the Society of Lithuanian Catholic Women (Lithuanian: Lietuvių katalikių moterų draugija) which was officially registered on 21 March 1908 by the authorities of the Kovno Governorate. Thus, the Lithuanian women's movement split into two branches – Catholic and social democratic.
