= Union of Lithuanian Teachers =

The Union of Lithuanian Teachers (Lithuanian: Lietuvių mokytojų sąjunga or Lietuvių mokytojų susivienijimas) was the first association of Lithuanian teachers. Established during the Russian Revolution of 1905, it continued to be active until the outbreak of World War I in 1914. It was organized illegally and thus operated as a clandestine organization. Its primary goal was to replace Russian with Lithuanian as the language of instruction in government schools. To that end, it agitated peasants to close Russian schools, drafted a Lithuanian curriculum, and announced a contest for primary school textbooks. However, its activities diminished significantly after 1907.

== Establishment ==
After the Uprising of 1863, private schools that could teach in Lithuanian were abolished while government schools served as tools of Russification. Lithuanians boycotted the Russian schools and organized clandestine primary schools. Therefore, the issue of education was particularly important for the activists of the Lithuanian National Revival.

In summer 1905, members of the Lithuanian Democratic Party decided to call a meeting of Lithuanian teachers. The initiative group included Juozas Gabrys, Felicija Bortkevičienė, and Pranas Klimaitis. The first gathering took place on 26 July 1905 in Vilnius. It was attended by 15 people, mainly teachers from Suvalkija – the region had Veiveriai Teachers' Seminary which accepted Catholics (i.e. Lithuanians) while other teacher schools in the Vilna Educational District accepted only adherents of the Eastern Orthodox Church). The gathering decided to convene a larger meeting and established the Union of Lithuanian Teachers.

The next meeting on 12 August 1905 attracted about 40 teachers. To avoid police attention, they gathered on the Hill of Three Crosses. They established the union and adopted its program which was published in Varpas. The union called for instruction in the Lithuanian language, expansion of the curriculum to included lessons on Lithuanian subjects (language, literature, history, and geography), elimination of Russification, parent involvement in teacher selection, mandatory primary education, reestablishment of Vilnius University, etc. The union realized that these aims were impossible without political independence of Lithuania.

== Activities ==
During the Russian Revolution, the Union of Lithuanian Teachers agitated peasants to close Russian schools and some of its members participated in local armed actions. According to data collected by the historian Antanas Tyla, out of 279 government schools in the Kovno Governorate, 132 schools were closed. Armed conflicts diminished by mid-February 1906. The Lithuanian Democratic Party published supportive appeals in Ūkininkas. Overall, in its goals, the union was supported by all Lithuanian political groups, including the Social Democratic Party of Lithuania.

During the Great Seimas of Vilnius in December 1905, union's representative Klimaitis presented a project for Lithuanian schools which was adopted. The final resolution of the Seimas included one sentence which expressed the key Lithuanian demands: teaching in Lithuanian and teachers selected by the people. After the Seimas, the union discussed issues of Lithuanian textbooks and adopted a curriculum for a three-year Lithuanian school which was published in Vilniaus žinios. The curriculum was prepared in a rush and therefore quite abstract and general. It recommended Lithuanian textbooks by Povilas Višinskis, Petras Bendorius, Jadvyga Juškytė, Juozas Gabrys, Maironis.

In 1906, with financial support from the Association of Lithuanian Patriots, the union announced a contest for writing new Lithuanian textbooks for reading, arithmetic, geography, and history. Due to diminished union's activities, the contest was continued by the Lithuanian Scientific Society. In various localities, the union worked to establish Lithuanian schools or replace Russian with Lithuanian as the language of instruction. During the third meeting of the union in 1906, Jonas Jablonskis proposed the idea of organizing teacher courses on the Lithuanian language and agreed to be their instructor. However, the Tsarist government did not grant permit for the courses. The Union of Lithuanian Teachers established contacts with other teachers' organizations, including the All-Russian Teachers' Union and the Education League.

Other meetings of the union took place during the annual meetings of the Lithuanian Scientific Society or during the gegužinė (Lithuanian version of May Day) celebrations in Šiauliai. However, soon the union weakened and was unable to function independently. During its 5th meeting in January 1907, the union resolved to work with local chapter of the Peasant Union. Revolutionary moods subsided after the dissolution of the Second Duma in June 1907 and increased Tsarist persecution.

Because the union was illegal, it could not publish its documents or resolutions. Minutes of its meetings were lost, likely intentionally burned by Antanas Kasakaitis.

== Publications ==
The union published two periodicals – Lietuvis (Lithuanian) and Mokykla (School).

Lietuvis was published every two weeks between December 1906 and February 1907 (a total of five issues). It was printed at the printing press of Martynas Kukta. Its official editor was Jonas Basanavičius, but its actual editors were Liudas Gira and Pranas Klimaitis. Lietuvis was the first Lithuanian periodical dedicated to schools and education.

Mokykla was first published on 18 February 1909 as a monthly supplement to Lietuvos ūkininkas and later Lietuvos žinios. In total, 63 issues were published before being discontinued on 23 March 1914. The publication was financed by the Lithuanian Democratic Party. It was edited by Konstancija Gaigalytė, Kazys Lekeckas, Matas Šalčius, Jonas Vilkaitis, and Juozas Zubrys.

== Leadership ==
The second meeting of the union took place on 6–7 December 1905, right after the Great Seimas of Vilnius. It elected its first board: Gabrielius Landsbergis–Žemkalnis (chairman), Ona Pleirytė-Puidienė (secretary), Felicija Bortkevičienė (treasurer), Pranas Klimaitis and Juozas Gabrys (members). Most of the board members were not teachers. While the leadership was involved with the Lithuanian Democratic Party, the two organizations were independent.

The most active members of the union were Pranas Klimaitis, Juozas Gabrys, Ona Pleirytė-Puidienė, Antanas Rucevičius, Vincas Palukaitis.

== Bibliography ==
- Bleizgienė, Ramunė (2020). "Žemaitės kūrybos sklaida 1905–1914 metų švietimo sistemoje". Literatūra (in Lithuanian). 62 (1): 45–72. ISSN 1648-1143.
- Karčiauskienė, Magdalena (1989). Pradinio švietimo raida Lietuvoje XIXa. antroje pusėje ir XXa. pradžioje (in Lithuanian). Kaunas: Šviesa. ISBN 5-430-00447-2.
- Mastianica, Olga (2016). "Lietuvių kalba Vilniaus švietimo apygardos vidurinėse mokyklose 1906–1914 m." Lituanistica (in Lithuanian). 2: 77–90. ISSN 2424-4716.
- Miknys, Rimantas (1995). "Lietuvos demokratų partija 1902–1915 metais". Lietuvių Atgimimo istorijos studijos (in Lithuanian). 10. ISBN 9986491223.
- Motieka, Egidijus (1996). "Didysis Vilniaus Seimas" (PDF). Lietuvių Atgimimo istorijos studijos (in Lithuanian). 11. ISSN 1392-0391.
- Paliukonis, Pranas (1967). "Lietuvos mokytojas amžių sūkuriuose". Aidai (in Lithuanian). 9: 369–380. ISSN 0002-208X. Archived from the original on 3 October 2011.
- Sergeenkova, V. V.; Ershova, O. I.; Gulyuk, M. A.; Sharaeva, E. I. (2008). Виленский учебный округ: политика российского правительства в области образования (вторая половина XIX — начало XX в.). Российские и славянские исследования (in Russian). 3. Archived from the original on 4 March 2016.
- "Lietuvis". Visuotinė lietuvių enciklopedija (in Lithuanian). Mokslo ir enciklopedijų leidybos centras. 27 April 2021 [2018].
- "Lietuvių mokytojų sąjunga". Visuotinė lietuvių enciklopedija (in Lithuanian). Mokslo ir enciklopedijų leidybos centras. 28 September 2022 [2018].
- "Mokykla". Visuotinė lietuvių enciklopedija (in Lithuanian). Mokslo ir enciklopedijų leidybos centras. 30 August 2023 [2018].
- Tamulytė-Jagminienė, Jūratė (16 November 2019). "Žinomam tarpukario Lietuvos švietėjui Augustinui Jakučioniui – 135". Bernardinai.lt (in Lithuanian).
- Tapinas, Laimonas; et al., eds. (1997). Žurnalistikos enciklopedija (PDF) (in Lithuanian). Vilnius: Pradai. p. 518. ISBN 9986-776-62-7.
- Tyla, Antanas (1990). "Slaptas lietuvių mokymas 1862–1906 metais" (PDF). Lietuvių Atgimimo istorijos studijos (in Lithuanian): 47–66.
