= Sofija Kymantaitė-Čiurlionienė =

Lithuanian writer, educator, and activist (1886–1958)

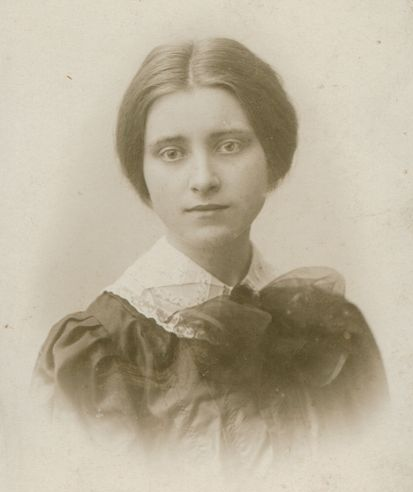
- Sofija Kymantaitė-Čiurlionienė in 1907
- Born: Sofija Kymantaitė; 13 March 1886; Joniškis, Kovno Governorate, Russian Empire
- Died: 1 December 1958 (aged 72); Kaunas, Lithuanian SSR, Soviet Union
- Burial place: Petrašiūnai Cemetery
- Education: Jagiellonian University
- Occupations: Educator, writer, literary critic
- Employer(s): Ministry of Defence; Vytautas Magnus University
- Spouse: Mikalojus Konstantinas Čiurlionis (m. 1909; died 1911)
- Children: Danutė Čiurlionytė-Zubovienė
- Awards: Order of the Cross of Vytis (1927); Righteous Among the Nations (1991)

Sofija Kymantaitė-Čiurlionienė (Lithuanian pronunciation: [ˈsoːfʲɪjɐ kʲiːmɐnˈtɐɪtʲeː tʃʊrˈlʲoːnʲɛnʲeː]; née Kymantaitė; 13 March 1886 – 1 December 1958) was a Lithuanian writer, educator, and activist.

After studying at girls' gymnasiums in Saint Petersburg and Riga, she studied philosophy, literature, and art history at the Higher Courses for Women and Jagiellonian University. She returned to Lithuania in 1907 and joined the cultural life of Vilnius. In January 1909, she married painter and composer Mikalojus Konstantinas Čiurlionis, but he died in April 1911, leaving her with an infant daughter. Until the start of World War I, she taught Lithuanian language and literature at teachers' courses established by the Saulė Society in Kaunas. She lectured at the Vytautas Magnus University from 1925 until her retirement in 1938. Čiurlionienė was also active in public life – she was a delegate to the Assembly of the League of Nations in 1929–1931 and 1935–1938, leader of the Lithuanian girl scouts in 1930–1936, and an active participant in various women's organizations, including the Women's International League for Peace and Freedom and the Lithuanian Women's Council. During World War II, she helped save Jews from the Kovno Ghetto and was recognized as Righteous Among the Nations in 1991.

In her essays on art and literature, influenced by ideas of fin de siècle and Young Poland movements, she criticized realism and supported symbolism. However, some of her own literary works are good examples of realism. Her most popular works are theater plays, in particular comedies Pinigėliai (Money; 1919) and Vilos puošmena (Decoration of a Villa; 1932). She also wrote dramas, plays for school theaters, and poems. Most of her novels explore the Lithuanian press ban and the Lithuanian National Revival.

== Biography ==
=== Early life and education ===
Kymantaitė was born to a family of a landless Lithuanian noble on 13 March 1886 in the clergy house in Joniškis. The family lived with her maternal uncle Catholic priest Vincentas Jarulaitis who taught her privately and sponsored her education. When her parents' business – a guest house and a small shop in Šiauliai – failed, the family moved back to live with Jarulaitis in Kuliai in 1893. In 1898, she enrolled into a primary girls' school in Palanga. The same year, Kymantaitė met priest Juozas Tumas-Vaižgantas, an active participant in the Lithuanian National Revival and editor of Tėvynės sargas, who was assigned to Kuliai. He taught her to read and write in the Lithuanian language. In 1899, she saw America in the Bathhouse, the first Lithuanian-language play in present-day Lithuania. In 1899–1904, Kymantaitė studied at the girls' gymnasium attached to the Catholic Church of St. Catherine in Saint Petersburg, at a private girls' school, and a public girls' gymnasium in Riga. In Riga, she participated in a secret Lithuanian student society established by Kipras Bielinis. Marcelinas Šikšnys continued to teach her Lithuanian. She also frequently visited the family of writer Pranas Mašiotas who read her first poems.

In 1904–1907, she studied in Kraków (then part of Austria-Hungary) at the Higher Courses for Women established by Adrian Baraniecki and the Jagiellonian University. She initially hoped to study medicine, but she did not know Latin and instead studied philosophy, literature, and art history. In Kraków, she met such Polish painters as Piotr Stachiewicz and Franciszek Turek; her teachers included Konstanty Górski for art history and Lucjan Rydel for literature. She also joined the Rūta Society, a Lithuanian society established by Juozapas Albinas Herbačiauskas, and started writing articles on Lithuanian literature. Her first longer study on poets Antanas Vienažindys, Maironis, and Pranas Vaičaitis was published by Vilniaus žinios in December 1906.

When her uncle Jarulaitis suffered a fire and could no longer support her education, Kymantaitė returned to Lithuania and joined the cultural life of Vilnius in 1907. Encouraged by Juozas Tumas-Vaižgantas, she took a job at the office of Viltis (Hope) and contributed articles and feuilletons on Lithuanian literature. She received further lessons in Lithuanian from Tumas-Vaižgantas, Jonas Jablonskis, and Jurgis Šlapelis. She participated at the First Congress of Lithuanian Women in September 1907. Together with Marija Pečkauskaitė, she was selected as vice-chair for the event. Kymantaitė delivered a speech on teaching the history of Lithuania and was elected to a 10-person committee charged with the establishment of the Lithuanian Women's Union. She also participated in the activities of the Rūta Society; for example, she performed the main female role of Aldona in the historical play Mindaugas by Juliusz Słowacki in May 1908.

=== Marriage to Čiurlionis ===
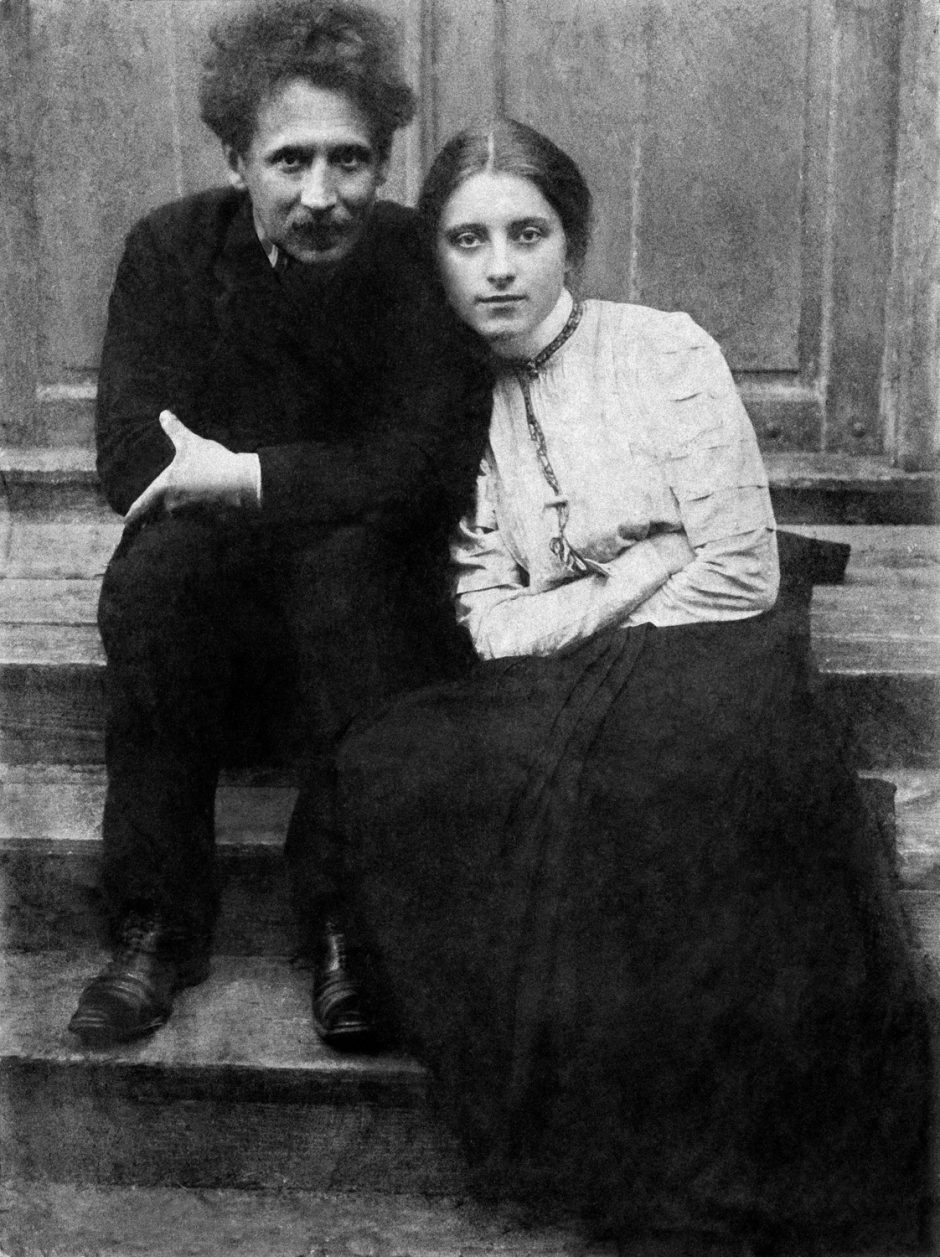
Kymantaitė and Čiurlionis in 1908

She met her future husband Mikalojus Konstantinas Čiurlionis at the opening of the First Lithuanian Art Exhibition in January 1907. At the time, she was engaged to Zygmunt Ruszczyc, a manor owner from Širvintos. Kymantaitė and Čiurlionis met again in November 1907 at an event commemorating Vincas Kudirka during which she delivered a speech and he played a piano. After the event, he asked her to teach him Lithuanian. She agreed, teaching him three times a week using "Lithuanian Grammar" by Jonas Jablonskis and a Lithuanian folk song collection by Antanas Juška. In summer 1908, they spent some time in Palanga and then visited their families in Plungė and Druskininkai to inform them about their engagement. They wed on 1 January 1909 in Šateikiai. The couple departed to Saint Petersburg to further Čiurlionis' artistic career. They returned to Lithuania to spend the summer in Druskininkai, Vilnius, and Plungė. In fall 1909, Čiurlionis returned alone to Saint Petersburg. When Čiurlionienė visited him around Christmas, she found him in deep depression and barely aware of his surroundings. He was placed in a sanatorium in Marki near Warsaw. She remained in Lithuania and gave birth to their daughter Danutė on 12 June 1910. Čiurlionis never saw his daughter – he caught a cold, developed pneumonia, and died on 10 April 1911 in Marki.

During their short relationship, the couple worked on a few joint projects – they organized the Second Lithuanian Art Exhibition, published a collection of literary criticism Lietuvoje (In Lithuania; 1910), painted a backdrop for the Rūta Society (she painted tulip ornaments in the Lithuanian folk style), and worked on an unfinished opera Jūratė. They both had an artistic strong influence on one another. The paintings of Čiurlionis received universal acclaim in Lithuania and the government founded the M. K. Čiurlionis National Art Museum in 1921. In 1922, Čiurlionienė agreed to sell 193 works by Čiurlionis for 65,000 German gold marks to the government. However, the money was put into a trust for the benefit of their daughter until she turned 21.

=== Educator and activist ===
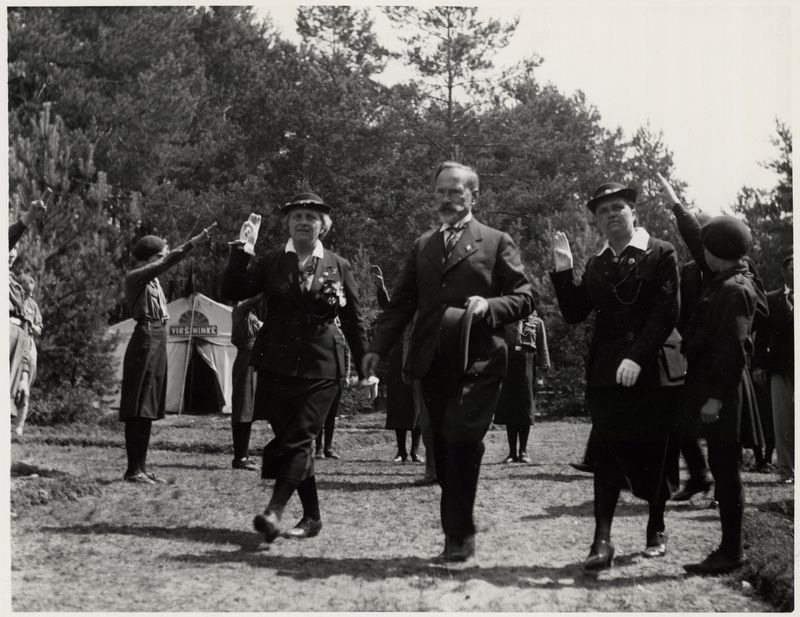
Čiurlioninė (left) with President Antanas Smetona at a scout's camp in July 1938

Widowed at age 25 and with an infant daughter, Čiurlionienė settled in Kaunas. She got a teaching position at teachers' courses established by the Saulė Society and taught Lithuanian language and literature. To raise funds to support struggling students, activists organized cultural evenings with lectures, music, and plays. During several such evenings, plays by Čiurlionienė were performed. During World War I, she evacuated to Voronezh and taught at the Lithuanian teachers' courses and girls' school established by Martynas Yčas. Since there was a lack of Lithuanian textbooks, she prepared and published a collection of articles Iš mūsų literatūros (From Our Literature; 1913), textbook Lietuvių literatūros istorijos konspektas (Outline of the History of the Lithuanian Literature) and an accompanying anthology (both in 1918). In 1919, she returned to Kaunas and got a job in the education department of the Ministry of Defence and prepared an anthology for the Kaunas War School. From 1925 to 1938, she taught the Lithuanian language at Vytautas Magnus University. In 1935, the university sent her to Western Europe to learn best practices of teaching language and literature. She visited Basel, Bern, and Geneva in Switzerland, Lyon in France, and Toruń, Warsaw, and Kraków in Poland. She collected material for a book on the methodology of teaching Lithuanian language and literature, but it was not finished due to World War II.

Čiurlionienė continued to be active in public life. In March 1929, she attended a meeting on the situation in Eastern Europe organized by the Women's International League for Peace and Freedom (WILPF) in Vienna. Her efforts to defend Lithuania's territorial claims to the Vilnius Region received praise in Lithuania and she was sent to the 6th congress of WILPF in Prague in August 1929. She also became a member of the Lithuanian government delegations to the Assembly of the League of Nations in 1929–1931 and 1935–1938. The other two members of the 1929 delegation were Prime Minister Augustinas Voldemaras and diplomat Vaclovas Sidzikauskas. In 1930, she joined the League's Fifth Committee which dealt with social and humanitarian questions such as human trafficking, prostitution, children's welfare. In Switzerland, she learned about the Union of Friends of Young Women (French: Union internationale des Amies de la jeune fille) established in 1877 and founded its chapter in Lithuania (Mergaičių bičiulių draugija) in 1929. The union sought to help young women who moved from villages to larger cities to avoid being exploited or trafficked. In 1935, Čiurlionienė returned to the League and became a member of the First Committee (legal and constitutional questions) and Sixth Committee (mandates, slavery and political questions), but returned to the Fifth Committee in 1936. In 1937, participated in the Second Congress of Lithuanian Women organized by the Lithuanian Women's Council where she read a paper on the causes for marriage failures. The Lithuanian Women's Council unsuccessfully suggested her to the State Council of Lithuania and to run as a candidate to the Fourth Seimas.

In 1930–1936, she was the leader of the Lithuanian girl scouts. From around 1926 to 1942, she organized Saturday gatherings in her home that attracted famous writers, poets, and linguists. Frequent visitors included Vincas Mykolaitis-Putinas, Balys Sruoga, Salomėja Nėris, and Kostas Korsaks. These gatherings resulted in the magazine Gimtoji kalba (Mother Tongue; 1933–1941) which was edited by Čiurlionienė for the first year. She also published numerous articles on language, education, and culture in various periodicals.

=== Later life ===
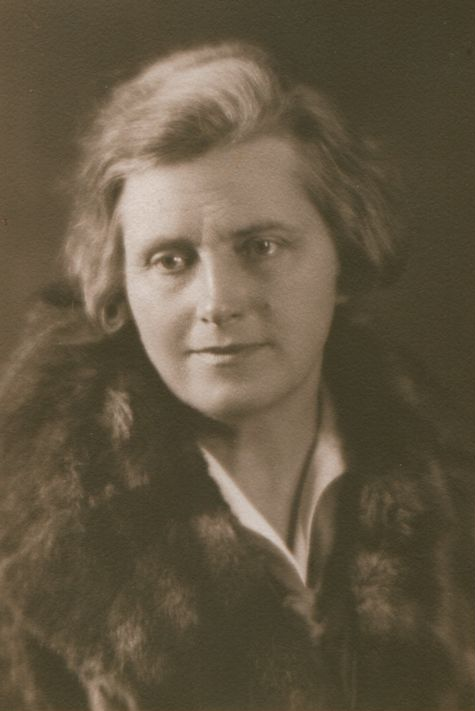
Čiurlionienė in 1932

Due to poor health, she resigned from her teaching position in 1938, but continued to be active delivering guest lectures. During World War II, together with her daughter and son-in-law, she helped rescue Esther, one-year-old daughter of the Jewish writer Meir Jelin. They worked with Petras Baublys, director of an orphanage, and saved children and others from the Kovno Ghetto. They were recognized as Righteous Among the Nations in 1991.

In 1954, Čiurlionienė petitioned Justas Paleckis, Chairman of the Supreme Soviet of the Lithuanian SSR, on behalf of Juozas Urbšys, the last Minister of Foreign Affairs of independent Lithuania, and his wife Marija Mašiotaitė-Urbšienė, childhood friend of Čiurlionienė and daughter of writer Pranas Mašiotas. Urbšys had served a prison sentence in Siberia but was not allowed to return to Lithuania. Čiurlionienė asked Paleckis to allow them to return and promised to house them at her home. They returned in 1956 and lived with Čiurlionienė. To earn some money, Urbšys translated from French to Lithuanian. In public, these translations were attributed to Čiurlionienė. One of such translations was the novel Madame Bovary by Gustave Flaubert published in 1958.

Čiurlionienė suffered two heart attacks and died in 1958. She was buried in Petrašiūnai Cemetery.

== Works ==
Her first literary works, a poem and an impression, were published in Gabija, the first Lithuanian almanac, dedicated to Antanas Baranauskas and published in 1907 in Kraków. She later published her literary works and critical essays in various anthologies and periodicals, including Naujoji Romuva, Lietuva, and Aušrinė. When her criticism of Sudrumsta ramybė (Disturbed Peace), a 1925 play by Petras Vaičiūnas, was not well received, she stopped publishing her reviews.

Her first book Lietuvoje (In Lithuania) was published in 1910. It contained seven essays by Čiurlionienė and one essay on music by Čiurlionis which she translated from Polish. The book provides a critical evaluation of Lithuanian culture and society. Influenced by ideas of fin de siècle and Young Poland movements, she was dissatisfied with realism which was prevalent at the time and supported symbolism that sought deeper and more significant meaning, explored spiritual life and longing. In her various essays on art and literature, she urged creators not to copy foreign examples but to look within oneself, to explore the national character and spirit embodied in the Lithuanian folklore, and to create more modern works. In this light, she praised plays by Marcelinas Šikšnys and Vidūnas.

Most of her literary works are theater plays, making her one of the first Lithuanian women playwrights. Her first play was Kalinys (Prisoner) about the escape of Grand Duke Vytautas from the Kreva Castle in 1382. Her most popular works were comedies Pinigėliai (Money; 1919; translated to Polish) and Vilos puošmena (Decoration of a Villa; 1932). These comedies by contrasting idealism with materialism showed the society's flaws and poked fun at greed and desire for profit. Another comedy Didžioji mugė (The Great Fair; 1939) explored families of the new capitalist elite – husbands chasing money and fame and their vain wives launching charitable initiatives and flirting with the Americans. Her drama Aušros sūnūs (Sons of Aušra; 1922) depicted the lives of book smugglers during the Lithuanian press ban. Her allegorical drama Riteris budėtojas (Knight the Watchman; 1934) was staged but she was dissatisfied with the production and had it canceled. In 1941, she wrote drama Tie metai (That Year) about the first Soviet deportation from Lithuania; it was first published in 1992. She also wrote plays for school theaters; the first collection was published in 1918.

Her works were highly influenced by Lithuanian folklore. In particular, her poem dedicated to Čiurlionis Giria žalioji (The Green Forest; 1915–1945), children's play Dvylika brolių, juodvarniais laksčiusių (Twelve Brothers Flying as Ravens; 1932), poem Mūsų jauja (Our Barn; 1910–1954) borrowed plot, symbols, and myths from Lithuanian folktales. For example, in Giria žalioji, a maiden searches for a fern flower. Her autobiographical novel Šventmarė (1937) is an example of literary realism even though she criticized realism in her essays. It depicts one parish in Samogitia during the Lithuanian press ban and paints a picture of social and cultural life at the time. The main protagonist is a Catholic priest, but despite her upbringing in the household of her Catholic priest uncle, Čiurlionienė does not dwell on Catholic morality and paints the young priest as a herald of the Lithuanian National Revival. The novel was adapted to theater stage by Liucija Armonaitė and staged in Alytus in 2013. The National Revival is also explored in the novel Bundanti žemė (Awakening Earth; 1913–1934) which depicts the lives of two young friends, one from the nobility, the other from the peasantry, and their paths to active cultural work. Čiurlionienė planned to continue the novel, but it was not written. A few of her works were written in the Samogitian dialect, including her last unfinished novel Žemaitiška poema (Samogitian Poem).

She also translated the French comedies Tartuffe and The Miser by Molière (both in 1928) and, together with others, translated and edited the Greek epic Iliad (1930).

== Legacy ==
Three volumes of Čiurlionienė's selected works were published in 1956 on the occasion of her 70th birthday. A comprehensive collection of her works in eight volumes was published in 1986–2013 by the Institute of Lithuanian Literature and Folklore. Her life has been a subject of monographs published by Ramutis Karmalavičius in 1992, Viktorija Daujotytė in 2016, and Nida Gaidauskienė in 2019. In 1996 and 2007, her only daughter published two volumes of memoirs about her. Her portraits were painted by Antanas Žmuidzinavičius, Justinas Vienožinskis, and others.

Čiurlionienė burned her letters to her husband Čiurlionis; his letters to her were published in 1973 (57 letters) and 2011 (expanded edition with new letters, memoirs by contemporaries) – both volumes were compiled and edited by Vytautas Landsbergis. A biographical film about their love story, Letters to Sofija directed by Robert Mullan, was released in 2013. She is also depicted in the theater play Svajonių piligrimas (Pilgrim of Dreams; 1975) by Jonas Vaitkus and Eugenijus Ignatavičius and film Žalčio karūna (Crown of Grass Snake; 1986) directed by Bronius Talačka. In 2017, Valentinas Masalskis who played Čiurlionis in the 1986 film established an annual art and music festival named Sofija in her honor.

In 1932, Čiurlionienė moved to her own house in Kaunas designed by architect Vytautas Landsbergis-Žemkalnis. Financed by funds from the sale of Čiurlionis' paintings in 1922, it is an example of the modernist architecture that has earned Kaunas the European Heritage Label and that is included on the tentative list of UNESCO World Heritage Sites. Her room has been preserved as a memorial by her family. Officially opened in 1971, it displays original furniture, old books, photographs, and personal belongings.

The house where she and Čiurlionis stayed in while in Palanga was added to the Registry of Cultural Property; a memorial plaque was affixed in 1969. A street in Aleksotas, a district of Kaunas, was named in her honor in 1993. The house in Joniškis where Čiurlionienė was born was identified in 2016. The house received some necessary repairs and photos of her were installed on its outside in 2019.
