= Stasys Šilingas =

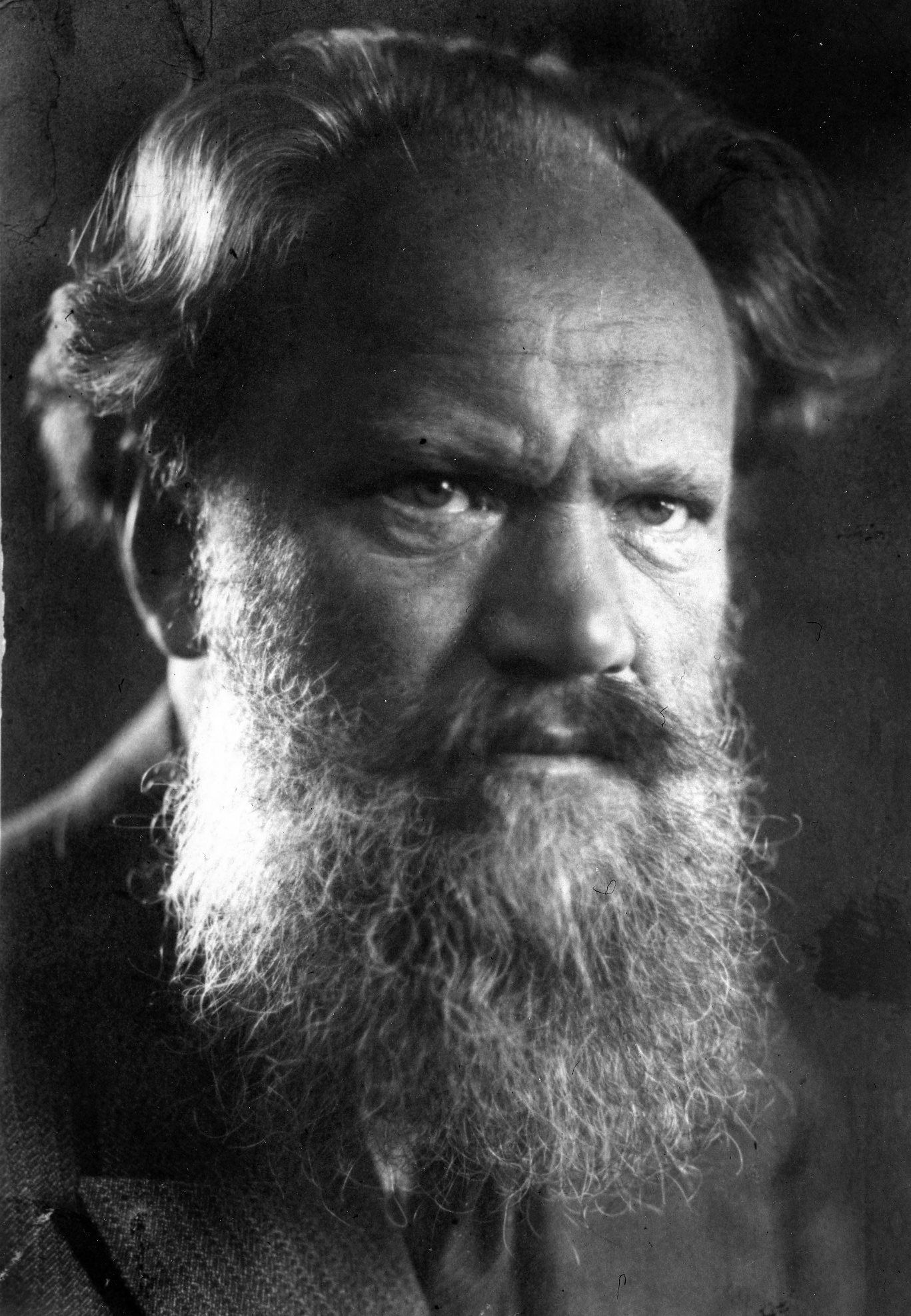
Stasys Šilingas in 1936

Baron Stasys Šilingas (11 November 1885 – 13 November 1962) was a prominent lawyer and statesman in interwar Lithuania.

When the independence of Lithuania was proclaimed on February 16, 1918, Šilingas served first as vice-president and then in 1919, as president of the Council of Lithuania. He was one of the main advisors and supporters of the authoritarian President Antanas Smetona. He was twice Minister of Justice, in 1926–1928 and in 1934–1938, and chairman of the State Council of Lithuania in 1928–1938. From 1920 to 1926 he was director of the Fine Art association. He also served as vice-chancellor of the Order of Vytautas the Great. After the occupation of Lithuania by the Soviet Union, he was deported in 1941 to the Russian Arctic.

== Early life and cultural activities ==
Šilingas was born in Vilnius. He was a Baron through his maternal grandfather, Count Stanislav Šilingas of Paberžė, who was exiled to Siberia and whose property and estate were confiscated by the authorities of the Russian Empire for his monetary support of the failed Uprising of 1863. Šilingas spurned the title using it only when it served to advance his country’s causes in giving him access to the Russian elite. He participated in the Russian Revolution of 1905, manning the barricades and even firing a pistol at the Imperial Russian Army.

Since childhood he spoke only Polish and Russian until he and Ramūnas Bytautas, his close friend, studied Lithuanian in Berlin in 1907. Šilingas learned Lithuanian to perfection. For this and for his oratorical skill, he was called "silver-throated" and "Cicero of the North" during his student years. He would go on to translate Lithuanian works into Polish and Russian, and other works into Lithuanian, including works by both Friedrich Nietzsche and Rabindranath Tagore.

He graduated from the Imperial Moscow University in 1912 with a degree in law. During his student years, he was active in the Student Union serving as its chairman. He published newspapers and journals for students and educators, including Aušrinė, eventually adding a supplement of Lithuanian folklore which he collected, called Vasaros darbai. In 1915 he single-handedly published Baras (First Forum) which included works by Kazys Binkis, Balys Sruoga, Ignas Šeinius, Sofija Kymantaitė-Čiurlionienė, Vincas Krėvė and others. Also included was his own poem Tautos dainų genezė ("Genesis of a Nation's Songs").

While still a student, he began collecting funds to preserve Mikalojus Konstantinas Čiurlionis’ paintings and other Lithuanian works of art. Over 25 years, his private collection grew to over 100 works of Lithuanian art. He was co-founder of the Lithuanian Art Society with Antanas Žmuidzinavičius and formally established the M. K. Čiurlionis collection. He also organized and staged Folk Art exhibits. As Chairman of the Opera Guild in Kaunas, he introduced La Traviata at the opening of the Opera Theater in Kaunas in 1920.

== Political career ==
=== Russian Empire official ===
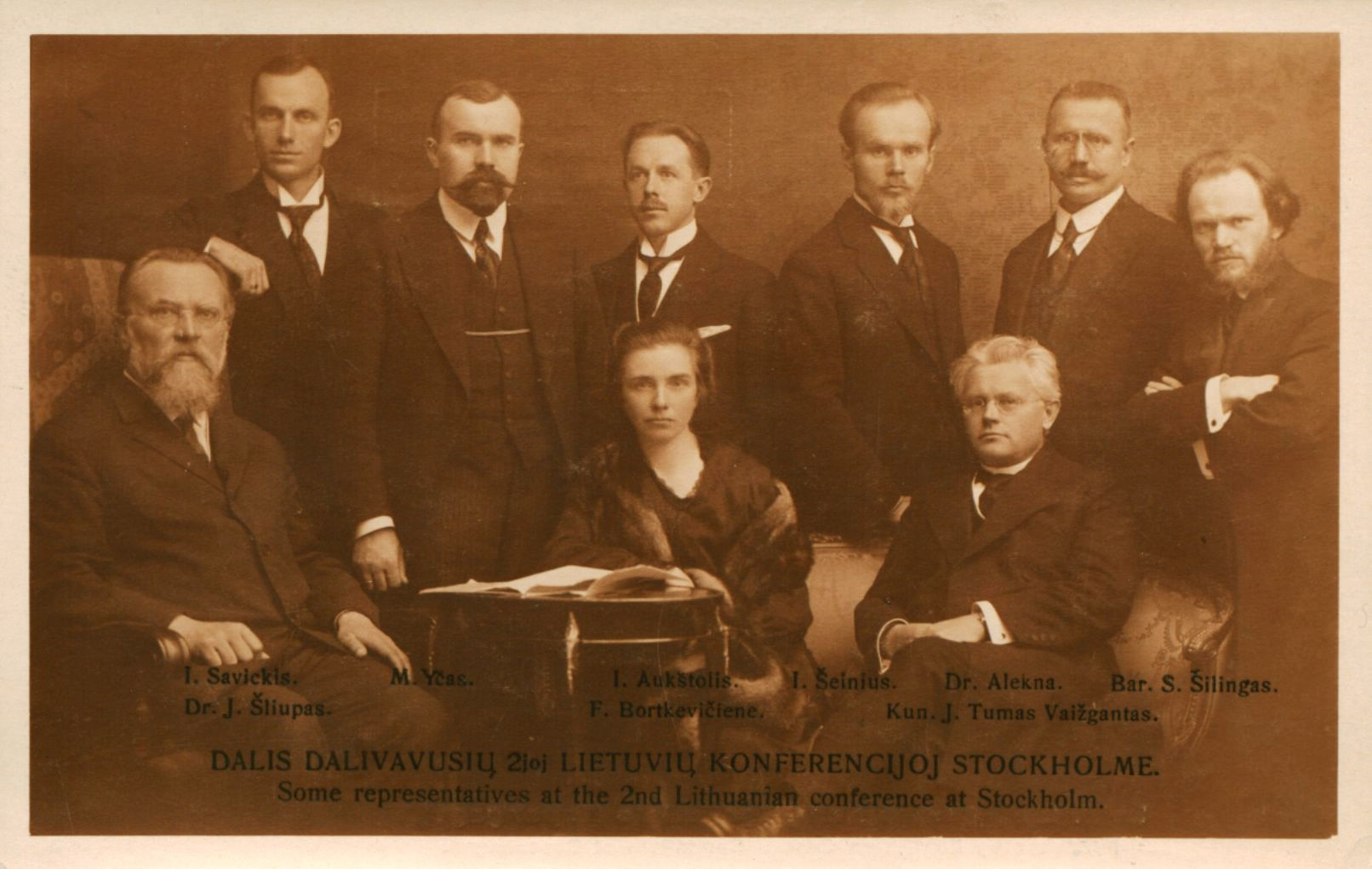
Šilingas (standing far right) at the Stockholm conference in 1917

From 1915 to 1917, he worked at the Foreign Affairs Ministry in Saint Petersburg, initially under minister Sergey Sazonov. During this two-year period of service, Šilingas gathered and dispensed funds to aid Lithuanians displaced by war in Saint Petersburg, particularly to writers and artists. He also opened a boys' high school for Lithuanians in Voronezh with Martynas Yčas, with whom he also participated in the First and Second Lithuanian Conferences in Stockholm to organize Lithuania's government during and after World War I.

On October 25, 1915, Šilingas, Balys Sruoga, and Ignas Šeinius met with Maxim Gorki to discuss publishing a book in Russian about Lithuania. He was always an activist for Lithuanian causes, being an able lobbyist with the Russians while serving as Chairman of the State Council of Lithuanians in Russia in 1917 when he also founded the Democratic National Freedom League (Santara), a democratic party whose purpose was to restore Lithuania as an independent nation. He was elected its vice-chairman and began publishing weekly issues of Santara which he personally funded. The same year he began to organize Lithuania's military scattered throughout the Russian Empire and to publish Liberty's Officer for army personnel. He also began to draft the statutes for the election of the Petrograd Seimas.

=== Lithuanian Wars of Independence activities ===
He returned to Vilnius in 1918 at the end of World War I and was a member of the State Council of Lithuania, creating a National Militia as Minister of Defence. He declared that he was philosophically opposed to dictatorial rule but that he was ready to do whatever was required for Lithuanian solidarity. With President Antanas Smetona and other government officials abroad in December 1918, they left a political and military vacuum, and Šilingas was able to hold both state and military together.

In 1919, he and Lithuania's government withdrew to Kaunas where he was elected Chairman of the State Council of Lithuania, serving until 1920. He had earlier resigned from Santara to protest the party bickering which he could not tolerate. Politically, he was to the right of the left-wing and supported the Lithuanian National Union (Tautininkai) drafting that party's statutes in 1933.

Among his accomplishments, he drafted the Constitution of Lithuania which was adopted in 1938 and organized the National Guard which successfully repelled an attempted Bolshevik invasion in 1918, during the Lithuanian Wars of Independence. However the Polish-Lithuanian War (1 September - 7 October 1920) resulted in the fall of Vilnius and its surrounding territory to the forces of the Second Polish Republic. The captured area was organized by the Poles as a new regime, the so-called Republic of Central Lithuania. Due to his previous high-profile activities, Šilingas was arrested in Vilnius by the new Polish-controlled regime in August, 1921, but released in November of the same year in deference to his title of Baron. He returned to Lithuanian territory remaining under the control of the Kaunas government.

=== Republic of Lithuania activist ===
He was co-founder of the M. K. Čiurlionis Art Museum in Kaunas. He was twice elected as representative of the Lithuanian Farmers' Union to the Parliament (Seimas) to accomplish land reforms in making land accessible to the people. He was Chairman of the Foreign Affairs committee. From 1920-1926, he was Chairman of the State Art Council, at which time he also practiced law to support his family.

He supported the dissolution of Parliament in 1926 in order to bring stability to the nascent nation, and he became Minister of Justice, reigning in the Bar Association for which he was duly criticized. He was thrice chairman of the State Council of the Republic of Lithuania (1917, 1918, 1929) and was decorated with the National Guard Star and the Vytautas the Great Star in 1931. In 1933 he completed the statutes for the Judicial System, for National and State Security, and for the Press, all of which were adopted. In 1934 he was named Minister of Justice a second time serving until 1938 at which time he withdrew from public life after delivering his "Testament to Lithuania" speech before a convention of the National Guard, stressing as always the necessity of reclaiming Vilnius.

After the adoption of his drafted Lithuanian State Constitution, he declined the position Chairman of State Council of Lithuania. He did not support acceptance of the Polish ultimatum in 1938 and thus advised that Vincas Krėvė-Mickevičius should assume Chairmanship in 1940. He was awarded with the Italian Cross of the First Order, the National Guard Star Order, and the first class Order of the Lithuanian Grand Duke Gediminas.

== Retirement and exile ==
In private life, he was friend to many innovative Lithuanian artists and writers, encouraging and publishing their works, now considered classics, including M. K. Čiurlionis, Balys Sruoga, Vincas Krėvė, Kazys Šimonis, and Adomas Varnas who drew caricatures of Šilingas to Šilingas' amusement.

He married Emilija Bytautaitė who was the sister of his closest friend Ramūnas Bytautas, a philosopher. He and Emilija had nine daughters. When he retired from public life in 1938, he moved with his family to Misiūnai, part of an old estate which he had purchased in 1925. There he designed and built his family home, a gathering place for colleagues and friends as well.

On June 14, 1941, during the June deportation, the Soviets arrested him, his wife Emilija, and daughter Raminta. They were separated before being deported to Siberia. Emilija died within 2 years of gangrene from frostbite; Raminta died less than year later of encephalitis. Šilingas learned of their location only after Emilija's death, and he never saw any of his family again. He spent over 20 years in exile: in camps and prisons of Siberia, the last 7 years of his life incarcerated at an Invalid Home in the Ukrainian SSR. At one time he shared a cell with former Lithuanian President Aleksandras Stulginskis and other Lithuanian dignitaries such as Juozas Urbšys, former Foreign Affairs Minister.

Finally allowed to write letters, in 1956 he was able to communicate for the first time with his surviving daughters who now lived in the United States, Australia, and Canada, and with former colleagues who had been allowed to return to the Lithuanian SSR. His voluminous letters are philosophical, scholarly, and historical and reveal some details of his life in exile. Allowed to return to the Lithuanian SSR only in 1961, he died in Kelmė within a year, on November 13, 1962. He was first buried in Kelmė, but in 1999, his remains, and those of his wife and daughter, were reburied in the family plot at Ilguva near Misiūnai according to his wishes expressed while in exile.

The Stasys Šilingas Society, founded in 1999, documents his achievements and life and commemorates his contributions to Lithuania's existence at yearly events in Vilnius, Kaunas, Šakiai, and other locations.

== Sources ==
- Dranseikaitė, Ramunė. “Stasio Šilingo Politine ir Visuomenine Veikla.” Vilnius: 2000.
- “Silingas, Stasys.” Encyclopædia Britannica. Vol. 20. p. 661. Chicago: Encyclopædia Britannica, Inc., 1957.
- Šilingas, Stasys. Encyclopedia Lituanica. Vol. V. pp. 166–167. Boston,: Encyclopedia Lituanica, 1976.
- Skipitis, Rapolas. Nepriklausoma Lietuva: Atsiminimai. Cikaga, 1967.
- Vaičiunas, Albinas. Stasio Šilingo Gyvenimo Kelias: Second Edition Supplemented and Corrected. Vilnius, Stasio Šilingo Draugija.
- Worthington, Svaja Vansauskas. “Sarsaparilla to Sorcery: A Lithuanian Narrative.” Proteus: A Journal of Ideas. Vo. 20, No. 2. Shippensburg, PA.: Shippensburg University, Fall 2003.
