= ŽIA valda =

Lithuanian investment company

- Type: Private
- Industry: Investment
- Founded: Vilnius, Lithuania (1997)
- Headquarters: Vilnius, Lithuania
- Key people: Gediminas Žiemelis
- Number of employees: 3000 (2008)
- Website: www.ziavalda.lt

ŽIA valda is a Lithuanian investment company pursuing projects of higher profit margin, usually, by establishing and consistently developing a new business unit, by consolidating companies of one business sector into one larger company or by acquiring a business which has growth potential but requires substantial reorganization.

Businesses which achieve a certain degree of development concentrate their efforts into attracting public or institutional capital by selling a portion of their shares on IPO or private placement markets. The company manages and develops businesses operating in the sectors of aviation services, infrastructure, financial mediation, agriculture, services for businesses and real estate.

The majority of the company's income comes from management fees, dividends and revenue from part sales of businesses. To this day, assets after loans owned by the company both directly and through its affiliates, related or associated companies are valued at nearly 120 million euros.

== History ==
ŽIA valda was founded in 1997. In 2002, the company become an investment holding company. At the same year, ŽIA valda acquired Žvilgsnis iš arčiau, a credit management and debt recovery company in Lithuania and the Baltic States with a 30% share of the market.

2003: founding of Agrovaldymo grupė (now Agrowill Group). Today, it's the largest agricultural company in Lithuania, controlling 17 producers and processors of agricultural produce.

2004: founding of Žemės vystymo fondas (main operations – acquisition and lease of land for farming purposes) which is involved in consolidation of farming land and lease of it to farmers and Agrowill Group.

2005: privatization of Lithuanian Airlines. Total area of premises owned by ŽIA Valda reached 30,000 square metres; area of owned land in Vilnius City – 27 hectares. Beginning of a private housing development project in Gulbinai settlement with a total area of more than 20 hectares (sold in 2006). Beginning of Kabantys sodai ("Hanging Gardens") project constructions on the edge of Vilnius centre.

2006: ranked second among a 1000 most rapidly developing Lithuanian businesses. Sale of controlling interest in Žvilgsnis iš arčiau (67% of shares were bought by an Icelandic capital company operating in over 25 countries, Creditinfo Group Ltd). Reorganization of Lithuanian Airlines, privatized a year ago, into a group of 3 businesses: flyLAL - Lithuanian Airlines, flyLAL Group Services (today known as Avia Solutions Group) and VA reals; in total the group unites 9 companies. Design and construction of infrastructure purpose objects in Vilnius International Airport: 3 hangars for aircraft repairs, private passenger terminal and office buildings.

2007: acquisition of 100% interest in Valstiečių laikraštis. Founding of UAB "Statinio interjeras"; field of operations – contracting, finish and general construction works.

2008: ŽIA valda launched a 48 m LTL worth share issue; bought out by an Icelandic capital company SX investments and a Lithuanian capital company Amber capital partners. Due to the arrival of new shareholders, the company forms a Board; Board's work regulation approved. Subsidiary company Finhill, registered a year ago, is issued with Category B broker licence which allows the company provision of finance related services. Agrowill Group was listed on the Vilnius Stock Exchange, becoming the first successful initial public offering for ŽIA valda. Within 3 months share value increases by 30% whereas average OMX index slumped by almost 30%.

At the same year in its meeting in strategic committee, the Lithuanian government endorses that AB flyLAL Group passenger terminal under construction in the place of the current premises owned by UAB VA reals is of strategic importance to Lithuania. The decision marks the beginning of the process to obtain a construction permit. The terminal is expected to be completed by November 2009.

Agrowill Group approves plans for active growth and intends to make around 10 acquisitions and increase the area of farming land and its revenue by several times. To achieve its targets, ŽIA valda increases the number of its shares by 40% and issues additional shares.

== ŽIA valda group of companies ==
- Agrowill Group
- Avia Solutions Group
- Raigesta
- VA Reals
- ŽIA Valda
