= Joana Griniuvienė =

Joana Griniuvienė (1865–1918), was a Lithuanian politician (Social Democrat), publisher, book merchant and feminist.

She was one of the pioneering women of Lithuanian politics, being a member of the Social Democratic Party in 1897 and elected to its central committee .

She was in important figure within the political press of the time.

She was active in the First Congress of Lithuanian Women and the Lithuanian Women's Union.
