= Valstiečių laikraštis =

Lithuanian-language newspaper

Valstiečių laikraštis (transl. The Peasants' Newspaper) is a Lithuanian-language newspaper targeting farmers. It mainly publishes articles related to agricultural policies, best farming practices and methods, and other issues of Lithuanian farmers. Established in 1940, it was an official publication of the Communist Party of Lithuania. In 1951–1989, it was published three times a week. Prior to 1951 and after 1989, it is published twice a week on Wednesdays and Saturdays.

== History ==
The first issue was published on 27 August 1940 in Kaunas by the newly established Lithuanian SSR. It replaced three pre-war newspapers – Lietuvos ūkininkas (The Lithuanian Farmer), a liberal weekly newspaper first published in 1905, Ūkininko patarėjas (Farmer's Advisor) published by the Lithuanian government, and pro-Catholic Mūsų laikraštis (Our Newspaper). Valstiečių laikraštis was not published between June 1941 and October 1944 due to the German occupation of Lithuania during World War II. It was reestablished in Vilnius on 27 October 1944 as a newspaper of the Central Committee of the Communist Party of Lithuania. Its editors included Jonas Zinkus (1945–1950), Petras Griškevičius (1950–1951), Jurgis Karosas (1953–1988), and Vladas Butėnas (1988–1992). In 1987, its circulation was 395,000 copies. At the time, it was one of the eleven newspapers published in Lithuania and intended for the entire country.

After Lithuania regained independence in 1990, the newspaper was briefly published by the Ministry of Agriculture before its privatization in 1992. In 1995, the controlling stake (82%) was owned by the newspaper's journalists. Its circulation was 108,000 copies in 1997. According to Michael MacQueen, the newspaper "won notoriety for publishing antisemitic articles" during the trial of the Lithuanian Holocaust perpetrator Aleksandras Lileikis. The newspaper also published Lileikis' memoir, Pažadinto Laiko Pėdsakais (In the footsteps of times past) in 2000. In 2007, the newspaper was acquired by ŽIA valda. It was sold in 2010 to a company that owned Balsas.lt web portal. The new owners had connections with the Labour Party and reportedly attempted to force the journalists to become independent contractors or accept cash pay without declaring it to tax authorities. In 2013, its circulation was 15,000 copies on Wednesdays and 32,000 copies on Saturdays. In July 2015, the newspaper was taken over by UAB Kaimo žinios.
