= Vladas Butėnas =

Lithuanian politician

Vladas Butėnas (15 July 1940 – 15 May 2009) was a Lithuanian journalist, politician and member of the Seimas.

== Biography ==
Butėnas was born in Anykščiai, Lithuania, on 15 July 1940.

Initially earning a qualification as zootechnologist, Butėnas worked as a zootechnician near Kuršėnai. In 1961, he enrolled at the Vilnius University, graduating in 1968 with a degree in journalism. During his studies and afterwards, he worked for various branches of local Soviet administration. In 1974, he graduated from the Higher Party School in Moscow and started working at the Central Committee of the Communist Party of Lithuania. In 1980 he received his doctoral degree in history. In 1983–1984, Butėnas worked for the Soviet embassy in Afghanistan.

Butėnas left the Central Committee in 1988 and became the editor of Valstiečių laikraštis (The Peasants' Newspaper), where he worked until it was privatized in 1992. Butėnas joined the ranks of Democratic Labour Party of Lithuania (LDDP) after the restoration of independence. In the elections in 1992, he represented LDDP and was elected as the member of the Sixth Seimas in the single seat constituency of Šilutė (32).

Butėnas died on 15 May 2009.
