= Felicija Bortkevičienė =

Lithuanian politician and publisher (1873–1945)

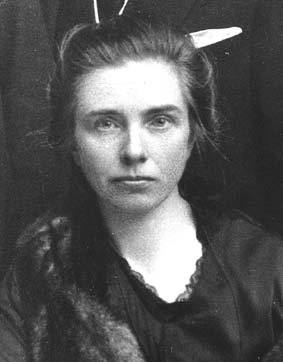
- Born: Felicija Povickaitė; 1 September 1873; Linkaučiai, Kovno Governorate, Russian Empire
- Died: 21 October 1945 (aged 72); Kaunas, Lithuanian SSR
- Resting place: Troškūnai
- Education: Flying University
- Years active: 1899–1940
- Known for: Publisher of Lietuvos ūkininkas and Lietuvos žinios
- Political party: Lithuanian Democratic Party; Lithuanian Popular Socialist Democratic Party; Peasant Union; Lithuanian Peasant Popular Union
- Movement: Lithuanian National Revival
- Board member of: Žiburėlis; Lithuanian Women's Association; Lithuanian Women's Union
- Spouse: Jonas Bortkevičius (1871–1909)

Felicija Bortkevičienė née Povickaitė (1 September 1873 – 21 October 1945) was a Lithuanian politician and long-term publisher of Lietuvos ūkininkas and Lietuvos žinios.

She became active in public life after she moved to Vilnius in 1900 and became known as an energetic and prolific organizer, manager, and treasurer of numerous political, cultural, and charitable organizations. She joined and was one of the leaders of various political parties, including the Lithuanian Democratic Party, the Peasant Union, and the Lithuanian Peasant Popular Union. She was a delegate to the Great Seimas of Vilnius (1905), was elected to the Constituent Assembly of Lithuania (1920), and was considered for the positions of Minister of Provision and Public Work (1918) and President of Lithuania (1926).

Bortkevičienė organized and ran several charitable organizations, including those supporting gifted students, political prisoners of the Tsarist regime, and deported Prussian Lithuanians. She was also a member of the women's movement in Lithuania, being an active member of the Lithuanian Women's Association and the chair of the Lithuanian Women's Union. For her various activities, Bortkevičienė was arrested and imprisoned numerous times by different regimes, including Tsarist Russia, independent Lithuania, and Soviet Lithuania.

== Biography ==
=== Early life ===
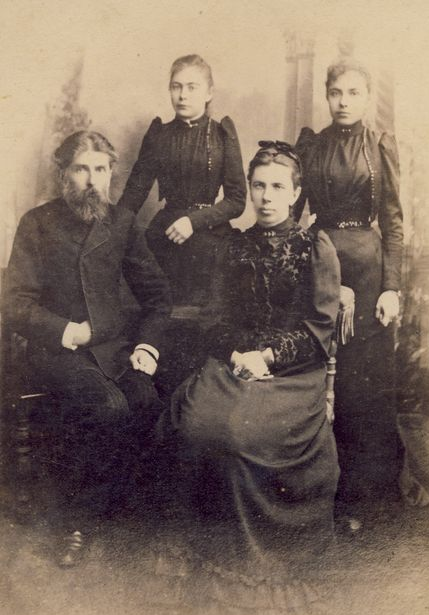
Bortkevičienė with her parents and sister

She was born in the Manor of Linkaučiai near Krekenava, then part of the Russian Empire, to the family of Juozas Povickas and Antanina Ona Liutkevičiūtė, petty Lithuanian nobles. The family's manor was confiscated for their participation in the Uprising of 1863 and the family moved to Antakalnis village, southeast of Ukmergė. Several of her relatives on her mother's side died in the uprising or were deported to Siberia. As a child, she visited her deported grandfather and two uncles in Insar. Bortkevičienė thus grew up surrounded by anti-Tsarist attitudes. She spoke a little Lithuanian, which she learned from her mother. Her father spoke Polish, but considered himself Lithuanian (see Polish-Lithuanian identity). By her own admission, she knew nothing of the Lithuanian National Revival before 1889.

She was tutored at home before attending the Marinskaja Girls' Gymnasium in Kaunas in 1885–89. She was expelled from the school for inciting five other girls to disobey a new requirement to pray in an Eastern Orthodox Church, but after much difficulty managed to gain admission to Vilnius Girls' Gymnasium and graduate in 1890. For a year, she studied Polish history and French language at the secret "Flying University" in Warsaw. Upon her return, she worked at a bank in Ukmergė with her father until his death in 1898. This experience was particularly useful later in life when she organized finances of various organizations. In 1899, she married engineer and childhood friend Jonas Bortkevičius (1871–1909). He was not of noble birth and her family disapproved the marriage. The newlyweds moved to Vilnius, where they became involved in public life. She studied the Lithuanian language and became passionate about its revival.

=== Before World War I ===
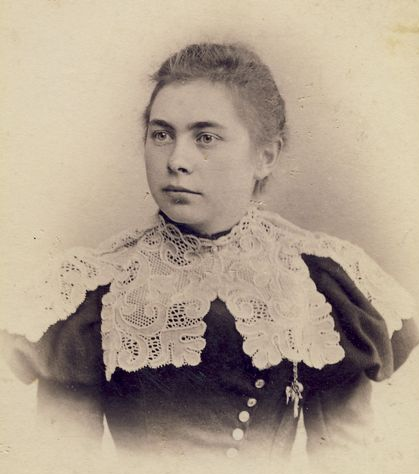
Bortkevičienė in 1890s

In Vilnius, Bortkevičienė joined an illegal intellectuals' society, later known as the Twelve Apostles of Vilnius. Through book smuggler Motiejus Baltūsis, Bortkevičienė gained access to the illegal Lithuanian newspapers Varpas, Ūkininkas, and Naujienos. After Baltūsis's arrest in 1902, she became involved in book smuggling and in publishing these newspapers. She would send manuscripts to the editors and raise money for their expenses. Some of the illegal publications would be hidden in the Church of St. Nicholas. She became a member of the central committee of the Lithuanian Democratic Party (LDP), established in October 1902, and a member of the board of the Lithuanian Women's Association, established in September 1905. Her home became a gathering place for intellectuals; sessions of the LDP took place in her home.

She supported the Revolution of 1905 by providing money, materials, and even weapons to agitators. She was a member of the organizational committee of and a delegate to the Great Seimas of Vilnius. The Peasant Union was established during the Seimas and Bortkevičienė became the manager of its central committee. The Union proposed and the Seimas approved a resolution calling for universal suffrage without regard to sex, religion, or nationality. According to memoirs of her contemporaries, she spoke little but was involved in nearly every aspect of organizing and running the Seimas. She assisted Ernestas Galvanauskas in his escape from the Panevėžys Prison and flight abroad. In December 1905, she was elected treasurer of the Union of Lithuanian Teachers. In 1906, the revolution was weakening and Bortkevičienė's work shifted to the Lithuanian press, which became legal. She published Lietuvos ūkininkas and Lietuvos žinios.

In September 1907, Bortkevičienė participated in the First Lithuanian Women's Congress and later attempted to prevent the women's movement from splitting into Catholic and liberal branches. She was also involved in charitable work, including with the Žiburėlis society, which supported gifted students (Bortkevičienė was its chair from 1903 to 1940), and the Martyr Fund (Kankinių kasa), which supported activists persecuted by Tsarist authorities (1904–14). For her anti-Tsarist activities, she was imprisoned four times. She was arrested for the first time in 1907 for participating in an illegal teacher gathering. Her husband was imprisoned in Lukiškės Prison in 1906 for three months; the experience weakened his health, and after a long treatment, he died in January 1909. Before the illness, he had a well-paid job at a military factory. She used her inheritance from him (about 5,000 rubles) to fund the publication of Lietuvos ūkininkas and Lietuvos žinios. In 1915, she became the first female Freemason in Lithuania.

=== During the war ===
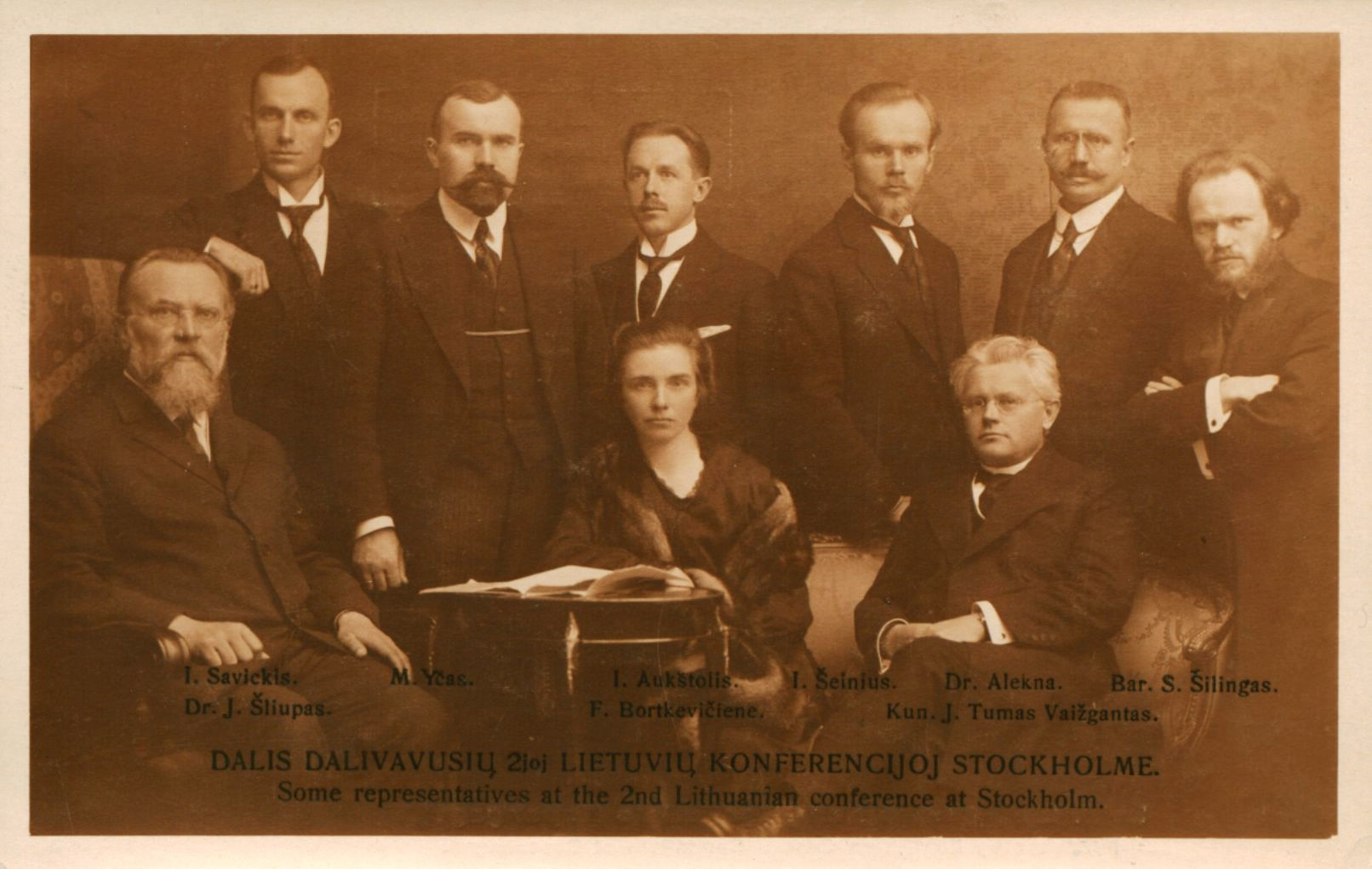
Bortkevičienė (sitting center) at the Lithuanian conference in Stockholm in 1917

In May 1915, she became a board member of the Agronomic and Legal Aid. After the German capture of Vilnius, Bortkevičienė evacuated to Russia and continued her active public work. She organized relief for Prussian Lithuanians deported from Lithuania Minor. She visited their communities in towns along the Ural Mountains and Volga River. The journey took five months. Her organization, the Lithuanian Care (Lietuvių globa), provided support to some 4,000 Prussian Lithuanians and maintained six elementary schools and four shelters for the elderly.

In April 1917, Lithuanians decided to organize the Lithuanian conference in Petrograd. Bortkevičienė was a member of its organizing committee and, during the conference in May 1917, a member of its Education Commission. During the conference, she opposed full independence of Lithuania and instead advocated autonomy within the Russian Empire. Within a few months, she regretted the vote and considered it a mistake. She became treasurer of the newly formed Lithuanian Popular Socialist Democratic Party. In October 1917, she was a delegate to the Lithuanian conference in Stockholm. After the conference, she lived in Copenhagen and worked with the Red Cross organizing relief for Lithuanian POWs in Germany.

In spring 1918, she returned to Vilnius and resumed political activities, reviving Lietuvos ūkininkas in November 1918. In December 1918, at the start of the Lithuanian–Soviet War, the Lithuanian government was in crisis and Bortkevičienė encouraged Mykolas Sleževičius to take charge and become the Prime Minister. Sleževičius considered her for the Ministry of Provision and Public Work, but members of the government expressed reservations about a woman minister and she was not selected. While the government evacuated to Kaunas, Bortkevičienė stayed in Vilnius.

At the beginning of 1919, Bortkevičienė and other prominent personalities, including Mečislovas Reinys, Juozas Vailokaitis, and Liudas Gira, were jailed as hostages by the Lithuanian Soviet Socialist Republic headed by Vincas Mickevičius-Kapsukas. The Lithuanian SSR demanded the release of communists held by the Lithuanian government. She spent six months in prisons in Lukiškės, Daugavpils, and Smolensk. On 24 July 1919, Vaclovas Sidzikauskas arranged a prisoner exchange in Daugailiai, swapping fifteen prominent Lithuanians, including Bortkevičienė, for 35 communists.

=== After World War I ===
In July 1919, Bortkevičienė returned to Kaunas. In April 1920, as a candidate for the Peasant Union, she was elected to the Constituent Assembly of Lithuania, but due to her busy schedule, she refused the mandate. She became a member of the Constituent Assembly in January 1921, replacing the deceased Juozas Lukoševičius. She helped prepare the Statute of the University of Lithuania and the Patient's Fund Law. The law was particularly important for women as it provided 6-week maternity leave and forbade termination of employment on grounds of pregnancy. During the Assembly sessions, Bortkevičienė rarely spoke, but she voiced her opinions on two major issues, land reform and the institution of the president. She opposed returning land that was confiscated by the Tsarist regime from churches and monasteries. When discussing the constitution, she also opposed creating the institution of the president. Both of these measures passed by the votes of the Lithuanian Christian Democratic Party. In 1926, she ran in the parliamentary election as a candidate for the Lithuanian Peasant Popular Union. She was not elected to the Third Seimas of Lithuania, but she was nominated for the presidency of Lithuania. She received one vote.

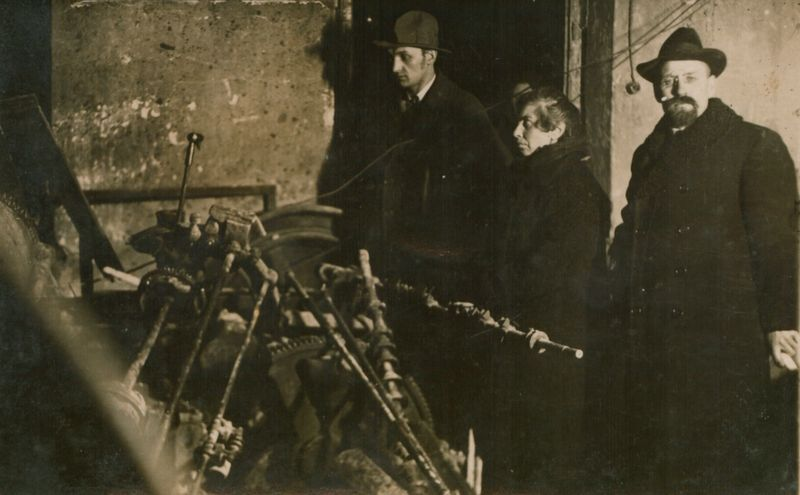
Bortkevičienė (in the middle) examines the Lietuvos žinios printing press after the 1927 bombing

In April 1920, together with the Lithuanian Popular Socialist Democratic Party (LPSDP), she established publishing company AB Varpas (bell), which she headed until 1930. Because LPSDP shared office space with the press, in effect, she was in charge of the finances and daily operations of LPSDP. In February 1922, she revived the publication of Lietuvos žinios and Lietuvos ūkininkas. The publications were outspoken about their ideals and did not shrink from criticizing the government, for which Bortkevičienė faced fines and arrests. In 1923 alone, there were 17 lawsuits in which Bortkevičienė was named as the responsible party. For publishing a caricature of Prime Minister Vytautas Petrulis and Minister of Defense Leonas Bistras in October 1925, she was fined 2,000 litas or imprisonment for a month and a half. Unable to afford to pay the fine, she was imprisoned until her friends raised enough money.

All her life, Bortkevičienė campaigned for democratic liberties and was particularly upset by the December 1926 coup d'état that brought the authoritarian regime of Antanas Smetona. Her publications were critical of the regime either directly or indirectly (for example, via examination of negative effects of other authoritarian regimes). On 11 March 1927, the printing house was bombed by unknown people; she lived in a small house near the printing house. In his memoirs, Kazys Grinius blamed Voldemarininkai for the explosion, but the group was only established in late 1927 and thus unlikely to be responsible. The explosion was powerful enough to collapse two floors of the building and destroy printing presses. However, the newspaper was not discontinued. The same day, Lietuvos žinios was printed by a different press. Bortkevičienė rebuilt the press by October 1928. The publication of Lietuvos žinios was temporarily suspended by the government censors four times; the last and the longest time was six months for making fun of one of the sons of Benito Mussolini. Bortkevičienė campaigned for amnesty of Juozas Pajaujis, who received a death sentence for organizing an anti-Smetona coup in 1927.

In 1922, she helped reestablish the Lithuanian Women's Union, which she chaired until 1928. She was also a member of other women's organizations, including the Lithuanian Women's Support Committee and Association of Lithuanian Women with Higher Education. She also participated in the establishment of the umbrella organization Lithuanian Women's Council in 1928, but became its opponent when the Council became financed and used as a political tool by the Smetona's regime.

When the Soviet Union occupied Lithuania in 1940, the press was nationalized, taking away Bortkevičienė's life work and means of living. In 1945, she was arrested and interrogated by the NKVD several times. That negatively affected her health and she died in October 1945 in Kaunas. Her funeral was supervised by the NKVD; her body was transported in a simple truck to Troškūnai and buried next to her sister.
