= 1936 Lithuanian parliamentary election =

- 10 June 1936
- All 49 seats in the Seimas; 25 seats needed for a majority
Party	Leader	Seats
LTS	Juozas Tūbelis	42
JL	Benedict Grebliauskas-Grebliūnas	7
This lists parties that won seats. See the complete results below.
Prime Minister before	Prime Minister after
Juozas Tūbelis; LTS	Juozas Tūbelis; LTS

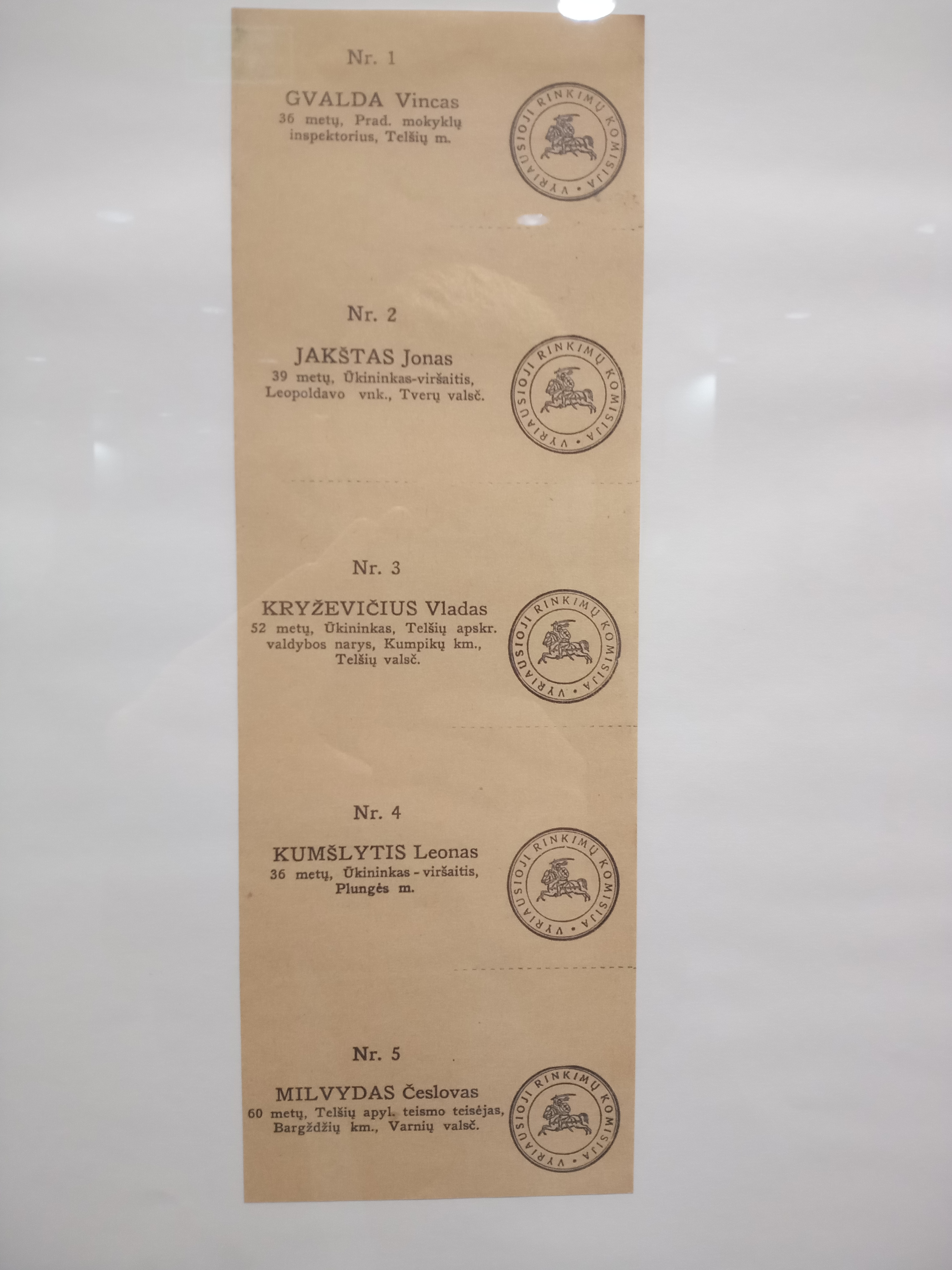
Ballot papers

Parliamentary elections were held in Lithuania on 10 June 1936, after a new law on holding elections was issued by presidential decree.

== Background ==
Candidates had to be nominated by district or town councils. The number of candidates nominated was equal to the number of seats available, and the number of seats was reduced from 85 to 49. All political parties were banned except the Lithuanian Nationalist Union and its allies.

== Results ==
The Nationalist Union won 42 seats, whilst the remaining seven were taken by Young Lithuania, a youth branch of the Nationalist Union. The fourth Seimas first met on 1 September 1936, and drew up a new constitution, which was promulgated on 11 February 1938.

Party	Seats
Lithuanian Nationalist Union	42
Young Lithuania	7
Total	49
