= Lietuvos žinios =

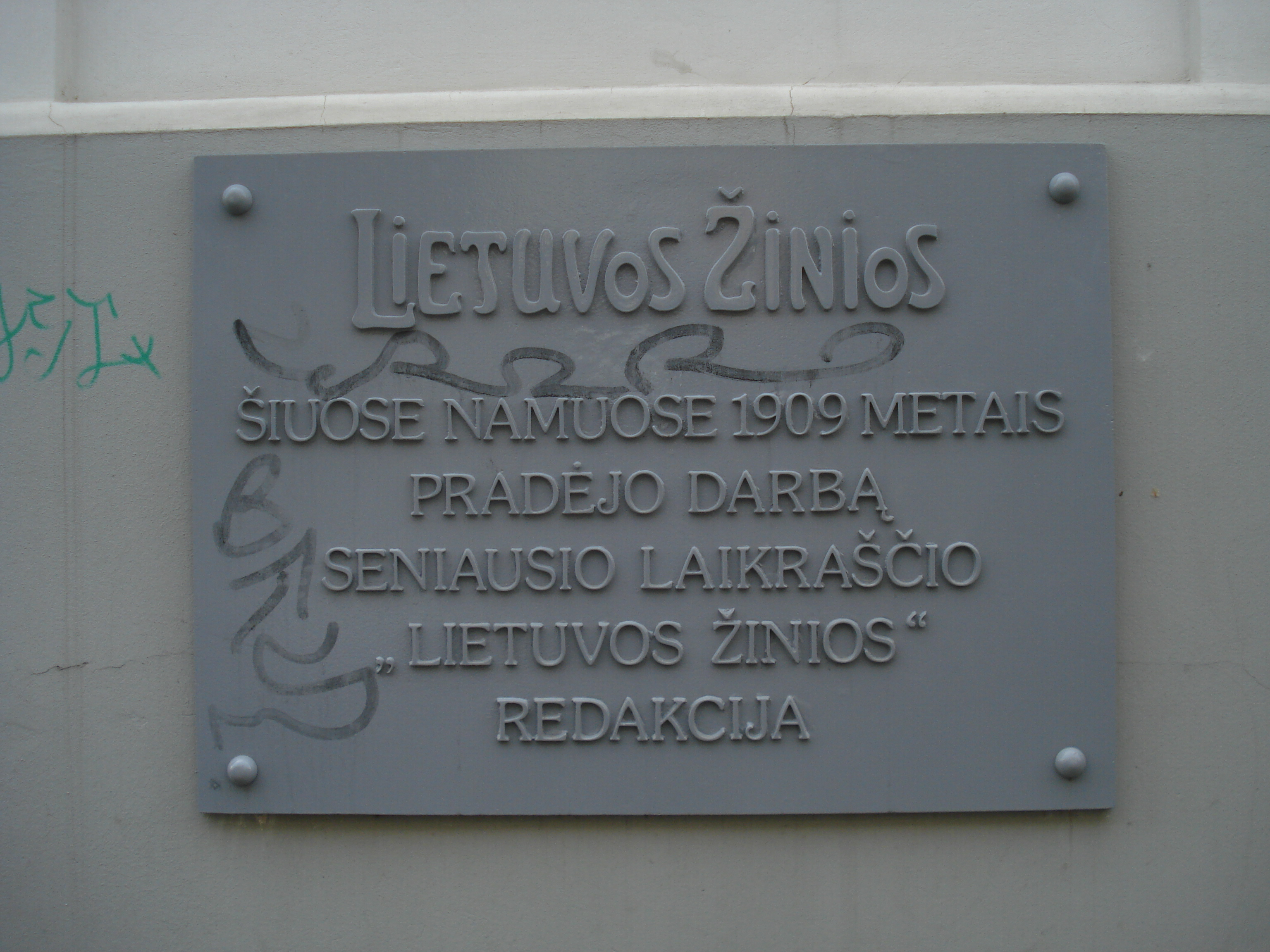
Plaque in memory of the Lithuanian newspaper Lietuvos žinios. Vilniaus street 25, Vilnius

Lietuvos žinios (literally: News of Lithuania) was a daily newspaper in Lithuania. Established in Vilnius in 1909, it was a liberal newspaper representing the Lithuanian Democratic Party. Even though its publication was interrupted by World War I and Soviet occupation of Lithuania, Lietuvos žinios billed itself as the oldest newspaper in Lithuania.

== History ==
=== 1909–1915 ===
Jonas Vileišis, publisher of Vilniaus žinios, decided to discontinue the newspaper and established Lietuvos žinios on June 19, 1909. A few months later he transferred the rights to the Lithuanian Democratic Party. Lietuvos žinios was published by partnership F. Bortkevičienė, dr. K. Grinius ir Ko and shared staff with Lietuvos ūkininkas. Its initial circulation was 2,500 copies. At first it was published twice a week. In 1911, it began publishing three times a week becoming a daily in 1914. The newspaper included semi-independent monthly supplements, including Aušrinė (for youth), Mokykla (on education), Farmaceutų reikalai (on pharmacy), Vasaros darbai (collection of folklore). Editors in chief were Jonas Vileišis, Gabrielė Petkevičaitė-Bitė, Mykolas Sleževičius, Jurgis Šaulys, and Žemaitė. Even though it was affiliated with the Democratic Party, the newspaper attempted to represent non-partisan liberal agenda. Lietuvos žinios reported on political, economic, and cultural news in Lithuania and abroad. After writer Žemaitė became its editor, the newspaper paid more attention to literature. It publisher a few of her short stories. Other contributing fiction writers included Ignas Šeinius, Julius Janonis, Balys Sruoga, Kazys Binkis. It was discontinued on August 15, 1915 due to World War I.

=== 1922–1940 ===
Lietuvos žinios was revived on February 16, 1922 in Kaunas by the Lithuanian Popular Peasants' Union. Its notable editors included Kazys Grinius, Felicija Bortkevičienė, Jonas Kardelis (1933–1940). In 1924, the newspaper had only four pages and circulation of 2,800 copies. Lietuvos žinios advocated for the Peasant Popular Union, publishing its agenda, resolutions and activity reports. After the elections to the Third Seimas in June 1926, the Peasant Popular Union formed a coalition government with the Social Democratic Party. This propelled the newspaper into the spotlight as the voice for the new government. After the coup d'état in December 1926, the newspaper stubbornly opposed the new authoritarian regime of Antanas Smetona, was censored, and even temporarily suspended. Despite political struggles, the newspaper grew to 12 pages (22–24 pages on Saturday) and circulation of 30,000 by 1935, at times competing with official Lietuvos aidas in popularity. The newspaper was praised for having a network of correspondents in each county of Lithuania as well as major European cities and its ability to publish news quickly and effectively. Lietuvos žinios was discontinued on September 1, 1940, after Lithuania was occupied by the Soviet Union.

=== 1990–2019 ===
In 1990, when Lithuania declared independence, the Social Democratic Party of Lithuania revived Lietuvos žinios as a newspaper for politics, culture and society. Its daily circulation peaked at some 30,000 copies and later plummeted. In 1993, it was acquired by the Achema Group. In 2010, it had circulation of about 20,000 copies. After suffering a net loss of 963,300 euros in 2018, the newspaper was discontinued on 30 April 2019.
