= State Council of Lithuania =

The State Council of Lithuania (Lithuanian: Valstybės Taryba) was a legislative institution in interwar Lithuania. It was an advisory institution that codified existing and proposed new laws. It was established by the constitution adopted on 15 May 1928. President Antanas Smetona dismissed the Third Seimas in March 1927. Although the constitution of 1928 retained the Seimas as the legislative body, new elections were not called until June 1936. In the absence of a parliament, the State Council performed some legislative functions of the Lithuanian government. It was liquidated on 26 July 1940 by the People's Government of Lithuania. Its chairman in 1928–1938 was Stasys Šilingas who became the prime legal architect of the authoritarian regime of Smetona. The archives of the council were lost after the Soviet occupation. Therefore, its activities are known mainly from the press (which was censored by Smetona's regime), memoirs of its members, and documents of other institutions.

== Activities ==
The law governing the State Council was adopted on 21 September 1928. The council convened for its first official meeting on 9 October 1928. In its functions, the council superseded the Commission of Legal Advisers of the Ministries (Lithuanian: Ministerijų juriskonsultų komisija) which was liquidated in November 1928. The council's statute was drafted by its member Mykolas Römeris. One of the most discussed and debated aspects became the council's competence to rule whether directives, orders, instructions, and other acts by various institutions of the executive branch violated state laws. Römeris envisioned the council as at least a partial solution for the lack of an administrative court in Lithuania though it lacked any kind of binding decision power. The council rejected proposals to accept public complaints fearing that it would become overburdened. Prime Minister Augustinas Voldemaras opposed council's desire to independently "notice" conflicts between laws and various orders and instructions. Therefore, its statute was not published and in practice the council "noticed" conflicts only when asked for a ruling by a minister.

In 1934, Jonas Vileišis was tasked by the council with preparing the preliminary project for a new civil code. At the time, four different civil codes were in effect in Lithuania: Volume 10 of the Digest of Laws of the Russian Empire was in effect in most of Lithuania, the Napoleonic and other French laws in Suvalkija, the German Civil Code in Klaipėda Region, and the Private Law of the Baltic Governorates in Palanga and small areas near Zarasai. In early 1937, the council organized a commission to continue the project. Its members unofficially used the Swiss Civil Code and Swiss Code of Obligations as models, but the new civil code was not completed. Similarly, the council undertook to write a new criminal code in 1938. Lithuania still used the 1903 criminal code of the Russian Empire which was imperfectly translated into Lithuanian in 1919, 1930, and 1934. However, the work was slow and it was not completed before the Soviet occupation in June 1940.

In fall 1936, the council formed a special commission to draft a new constitution of Lithuania. The commission, chaired by Stasys Šilingas, started its work by borrowing the April Constitution of Poland adopted in 1935. In five months the commission held 109 meetings and produced the first draft by April 1937. The commission finished its work in July 1937 and the constitution was further modified by the Council of Ministers which made two critical changes: deleted the entire first section which was a declaration of Lithuanian nationalism and removed a sentence declaring President of Lithuania to be above the government, parliament, or courts. Šilingas protested the changes and resigned from the State Council on 1 February 1938. The modified constitution was adopted by the Fourth Seimas on 11 February and became effective 12 May 1938.

The council paid special attention to the creation and development of the proper legal terminology in the Lithuanian language. It had a permanent editorial commission to ensure that all published acts were written in proper Lithuanian and two special commissions on terminology, which included linguist Antanas Salys. The council and its commissions reviewed and established several hundred legal terms, including same basics like nusikaltimas (crime) and kaltinamasis (the accused), that are widely used and accepted.

== Members ==
Initially, the council had five members; it later grew to nine members and four advisors. During its existence, 18 people were members of the council, including Stasys Šilingas, attorney Mykolas Römeris, General Teodoras Daukantas, banker Vladas Jurgutis, mayor Jonas Vileišis, judge Boleslovas Jonas Masiulis (was its chairman 1938–1940). The members were appointed and dismissed by the President upon a recommendation of the Prime Minister. Generally, the members were selected for their expertise and not for their political loyalty to President Smetona or the Lithuanian Nationalist Union. The council was well funded and its members received high salaries. For example, in 1937, the state budget allotted 785,000 litas to the Fourth Seimas, 266,000 litas to the President, 381,000 litas to the Cabinet, and 310,000 litas to the State Council.
