= First Congress of Lithuanian Women =

The First Congress of Lithuanian Women (Lithuanian: Pirmasis lietuvių moterų suvažiavimas) took place on 6–7 October [O.S. 23–24 September] 1907 in Kaunas (then part of the Russian Empire, now Lithuania). It was organized by Catholic priests in preparation for the October 1907 election to the third State Duma but discussed only cultural and economic issues. The organizers attempted to invite representatives of different social classes and political affiliations leading to disagreements between socialists and Catholic clergy, and between educated intellectuals and less educated villagers. The congress resolved to establish the Lithuanian Women's Union. However, disagreements between the liberals and the Catholics led to splintering of the women's movement and to the establishment of the Association of Lithuanian Catholic Women in January 1908. The Women's Union was officially established only in 1922.

== Organization ==
The Lithuanian Women's Association was established in September 1905 during the Russian Revolution in Vilnius. It was organized and headed by women members of the intelligentsia. Different developments took place in Kaunas where women's issues were taken up by the members of the Catholic clergy, particularly by priest Povilas Januševičius. The priests organized the Society of Saint Zita for female servants and maids.

In preparation for the October 1907 election to the third State Duma, Januševičius organized the First Congress of Lithuanian Women (the women were not allowed to vote in the election). According to Sofija Kymantaitė-Čiurlionienė, the congress originated from an idea to establish a shop of homemade textiles and a need to recruit village women for the enterprise. There were very few women intellectuals in Kaunas. The priests selected seven women for the organizational committee, however, according to Kymantaitė-Čiurlionienė, only one of them – Cecilija Leonienė, the wife of attorney Petras Leonas – had attended a gymnasium. The organizational committee invited women from villagers (more conservative and Catholic) and the women intellectuals from Vilnius (more liberal and anti-religious). To obtain the government permit for the gathering, it would not discuss any social or political issues, only cultural and economic affairs.

== Proceedings ==
The congress was opened by writer Gabrielė Petkevičaitė-Bitė. Priests then wanted to elect a board to preside over the congress with a priest as its chairman. Petkevičaitė felt it was insulting to the women and proposed herself as the chair of the congress. She also proposed Sofija Kymantaitė-Čiurlionienė and Marija Pečkauskaitė as vice-chairs, Ona Pleirytė-Puidienė as secretary, and Petras Leonas as advisor. According to Leonas, due to poor health and weak voice, Petkevičaitė presided over the proceedings only on paper; Pleirytė-Puidienė managed most of the actual work. None of the members of the original organizational committee got included on the board which left them feeling sidelined and snubbed.

The proceedings opened with a cantata about Lithuanian women composed specifically for the event by Ksaveras Sakalauskas-Vanagėlis. The first day featured several speeches and presentations on the women's movement in Lithuania by Leonienė, on hardships of village women by Julija Žymantienė-Žemaitė, on public duties (e.g. working as low-paid teachers or volunteer as nurses) of women intellectuals by Petkevičaitė, on women's professional education by Teresė Kubilinskaitė, on teaching the history of Lithuania by Kymantaitė-Čiurlioninenė, on women's honor by Pečkauskaitė, on schools, on ways to combat alcoholism, on homemade textiles, on vegetables and fruits. Most speakers stressed the need for education to improve one's circumstances. Women attendees also complained about their suffering – villagers about husbands who abused alcohol, city maids and servants about their exploitative employers. The women planned to publish a book will all presentations, but could not find a publisher. Three presentations were published in Vilniaus žinios.

The second day saw more heated debates between socialists and Catholic clergy. Men became more active during these debates; they constituted a third of all speakers. The congress discussed whether to establish a newspaper dedicated to women's issues as well as the relationship between Lithuanian Women's Association and the Russian Union for Women's Equality. It was decided that the Lithuanian association should not become a chapter of the Russian union and should collaborate with the union as long as this collaboration did not hinder the women's movement in Lithuania. The congress concluded with the adoption of a resolution which called for the establishment of the new Lithuanian Women's Union which would participate in the international women's movement. Most contentious issue was the election of a 10-member committee to organize this new union as socialists and Catholic clergy fought for influence. The committee included Gabrielė Petkevičaitė as chair, Sofija Kymantaitė-Čiurlionienė and Marija Pečkauskaitė as vicechairs, Ona Pleirytė-Puidienė and Marija Putvinskaitė-Žmuidzinavičienė as secretaries, Celina Leonienė and Kotryna Norkytė as treasurers, and Joana Griniuvienė, Elena Vaitkevičienė, and Teklė Augustinavičiūtė as members of the revision sub-committee. Several other women, including Felicija Bortkevičienė and Julija Žymantienė, were selected as candidates in case of any resignations.

== Attendees ==
The apolitical agenda attracted representatives from different organizations and political parties. Therefore, the congress included women from different social classes and political convictions but since the proceedings were in the Lithuanian language, other nationalities (Russian, Polish, Jewish) were not represented. The total number of attendees is unknown. Participants later put estimates ranging from 350 to 700. The attendees had to purchase tickets that cost 25 kopeks for women and one ruble for men.

The women attendees included essentially all Lithuanian cultural elite at the time – Gabrielė Petkevičaitė-Bitė, Sofija Kymantaitė-Čiurlionienė, Ona Pleirytė-Puidienė, Julija Žymantienė-Žemaitė, Marija Pečkauskaitė (Šatrijos Ragana), Cecilija Leonienė, Felicija Bortkevičienė, Liudvika Didžiulienė, Marija Putvinskaitė-Žmuidzinavičienė, Teresė Kubilinskaitė. Men participants included Petras Leonas, Mykolas Sleževičius, Juozas Tumas-Vaižgantas, Konstantinas Olšauskas, Povilas Dogelis, Vincas Kapsukas, Karolis Požela, Steponas Kairys, Augustinas Janulaitis, Kazys Grinius.

== Aftermath ==
The congress failed to unify women activists – women's movement in Lithuania split into two main branches: conservative Catholic and liberal-socialist. The disagreements became evident during the congress and only deepened when each side began publishing accusing articles in the Lithuanian press. The 10-member committee started working on the statute of the planned Lithuanian Women's Union. The first draft was prepared mainly by Kymantaitė-Čiurlionienė and Pleirytė-Puidienė based on the statute of the Russian Union for Women's Equality. In November, the statute was submitted to the Governor-General of Vilna for approval, but it was rejected. The Catholics protested this statute as they wanted to copy examples of organizations of Belgian and German Catholic women, not Russian liberals. After a failed attempt to find a compromise in December 1907, the Catholic camp established the Association of Lithuanian Catholic Women in January 1908. The Catholic association was approved by Kovno Governorate. The Tsarist authorities would not approve another women's organization thus effectively preventing the Lithuanian Women's Union from being organized. The Women's Union was officially established only in 1922.

The congress resolved to petition the State Duma to ban the sale of vodka. Catholic women collected 20,027 signatures under the petition.

== Other congresses ==
- Second Congress of Lithuanian Women took place in September 1937 in Kaunas
- Third Congress of Lithuanian Women took place in December 2000 in Vilnius
- Fourth Congress of Lithuanian Women took place in August 2005 in Vilnius
