= Lithuanian Catholic Women's Organization =

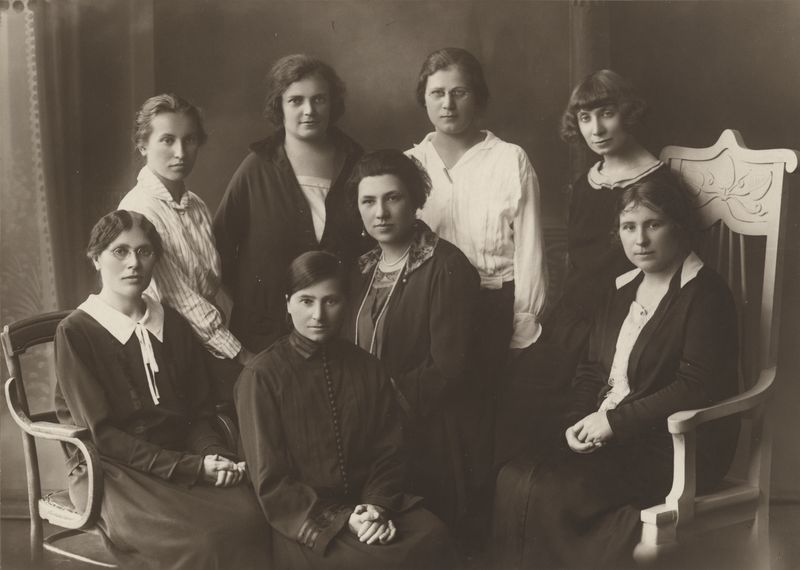
Lithuanian Catholic Women's Organization's central committee

The Lithuanian Catholic Women's Organization (Lithuanian: Lietuvių katalikių moterų draugija, LKMD) was a Lithuanian women's organization. Founded in Kaunas in 1908, it promoted women's education, social welfare, economic independence and Catholic values. In interwar Lithuania it was the largest women's organization.

== History ==
=== Establishment ===
The organisation emerged from the First Congress of Lithuanian Women which took place in Kaunas in 1907. Disagreements between Catholic and liberal participants led to the formation of separate women's organisations. The Lithuanian Catholic Women's Organization was established in March 1908, and its founding assembly took place on 26 April, attended by approximately 200 women. Its objectives included improving women's education, protecting women's rights and promoting their economic well-being in accordance with Catholic social teaching.

In 1908, the organisation established a school of crafts and domestic management for girls in Kaunas. From 1910, it published the newspaper Lietuvaitė (Lithuanian Girl). By the beginning of the First World War, it had established branches in several Lithuanian towns.

In July 1912, the Russian imperial authorities temporarily closed the organisation, and its statutes were formally renewed in November of that year. During the First World War, German occupation authorities suspended its activities. The organisation was revived in Kaunas in 1917 and subsequently resumed its educational and social programmes.

=== Interwar period ===
The organisation resumed its activities in 1917 and expanded considerably after Lithuania regained independence. It established agricultural schools for girls, kindergartens, charitable institutions and vocational facilities.

It also advocated women's political and legal rights. In 1918 it demanded women's representation in the Lithuanian Council. In 1922, a legislative proposal prepared by the organisation concerning the inheritance rights of wives and daughters was adopted by the Lithuanian parliament.

In 1920, it began publishing the magazine Moteris (Woman), which covered women's social, economic, political and religious issues. The magazine continued until 1940.

The organisation also established employment offices and residential facilities for young women, as well as maternity and childcare institutions. In 1928, it had 217 branches and approximately 20,000 members.

=== Dissolution and revival ===
The Lithuanian Catholic Women's Organization was dissolved in 1940 following the Soviet occupation of Lithuania, and its property was confiscated.

In 1946, the organisation was re-established among Lithuanian exiles in Tübingen, Germany, through the efforts of Lithuanian Catholic women. Its activities continued among Lithuanian communities abroad. In Lithuania, its work was revived in 1994 by the Lithuanian Catholic Women's Union (Lietuvos katalikių moterų sąjunga).

== See also ==
- Lithuanian Women's Union
