= Lietuvos ūkininkas =

Lithuanian-language newspaper

Lietuvos ūkininkas (transl. Lithuanian farmer) was a weekly Lithuanian-language newspaper published between 1905 and 1940. It was published by and reflected the political views of the Lithuanian Democratic Party, Peasant Union, and Lithuanian Peasant Popular Union. Its printing and daily operations were managed by its long-time publisher Felicija Bortkevičienė. It was a liberal publication geared towards the wider audience of less educated farmers and peasants. In 1933, its circulation was 15,000 copies. When Lithuania was occupied by the Soviet Union in 1940, the newspaper was nationalized and replaced by Valstiečių laikraštis.

== History ==
Aster the end of the Lithuanian press ban in 1904, Jonas Vileišis started organizing a replacement publication for Ūkininkas, monthly newspaper published in East Prussia. The first issue appeared in Vilnius on 14 December 1905, after the Great Seimas of Vilnius. The first two issues were edited by Povilas Višinskis (though Antanas Smetona signed as the editor) and reflected strong revolutionary ideas (see the Russian Revolution of 1905). The Lithuanian Democratic Party (LDP) was afraid that Tsarist authorities would ban the newspaper and agreed to soften its tone. Višinskis was replaced by Smetona. At the same time it became apparent that LDP did not have enough funds to support the newspaper and Smetona suggested transferring the publication to a private entity. This plan was vehemently opposed by Felicija Bortkevičienė who agreed to take over the publishing and support the newspaper financially from her own funds.

Smetona was too moderate and did not fully support the Revolution of 1905. Therefore, he was removed in June 1906. The newspaper reaffirmed its goal to support interests of farmers and peasants and to propagate democratic, anti-Tsarist and anti-clergy ideas. For example, in 1912, the newspaper supported Menahem Mendel Beilis during his blood libel trial; but the support was not well received by Lithuanian public and readership dipped. Because of its liberal opinions, Lietuvos ūkininkas was a frequent target of Tsarist censors. Therefore, officially, newspaper's editors and publishers were people little involved in its work as their arrest would have little impact on the continuation of the issues. Bortkevičienė was arrested in 1912. The newspaper also faced financial difficulties. Bortkevičienė used inheritance from her husband (some 5,000 rubles) to cover the deficits in 1909. She also did not take any salary until 1914. A trust company (Felicija Bortkevičienė, Kazys Grinevičius ir Ko „Lietuvos Ūkininkui“ ir kitiems laikraščiams leisti) was created to support the publication via membership fees. In 1908, the newspaper had a circulation of 6,000 copies.

The publication ceased when Germans occupied Vilnius in September 1915 during World War I. It was revived in October 1918 in Vilnius, but had to evacuate to Kaunas at the outbreak of the Lithuanian–Soviet War. Bortkevičienė resumed her duties as the publisher; in 1920 the publication was entrusted to publishing house AB Varpas, which she headed until 1930. When Lithuania was occupied by the Soviet Union, the newspaper was nationalized and replaced by Valstiečių laikraštis in August 1940.

Lietuvos ūkininkas published several supplements, including 365 issues of bimonthly Žemė (1907–1928) with practical advise on farming, 63 issues of monthly Mokykla (1909–1912) by the Union of Lithuanian Teachers, monthly Jaunimas (1909–1928, became an independent magazine) targeting youth and students, and 8 issues of liberal Žibutė (1911–1913) targeting Lithuanian women.

== Editors ==
The newspaper had many editors over the years:

- Povilas Višinskis (1905 – the first two issues)
- Antanas Smetona (1905–1906)
- Juozas Bagdonas (1906–1907)
- Mykolas Sleževičius (1907–1912)
- Pranas Ruseckas, Kazys Grinius, Albinas Rimka (1908–1911)
- Jonas Abraitis, Mečys Markauskas, Matas Untulis, Jonas Kriščiūnas (1913–1915)
- Albinas Rimka, Adolfas Klimas (1918–1921)
- Jonas Strimaitis (1922–1923)
- Vincas Oškinis (1923–1940)
