= Dominikonų Street, Vilnius =

Street in Vilnius, Lithuania

Dominikonų Street
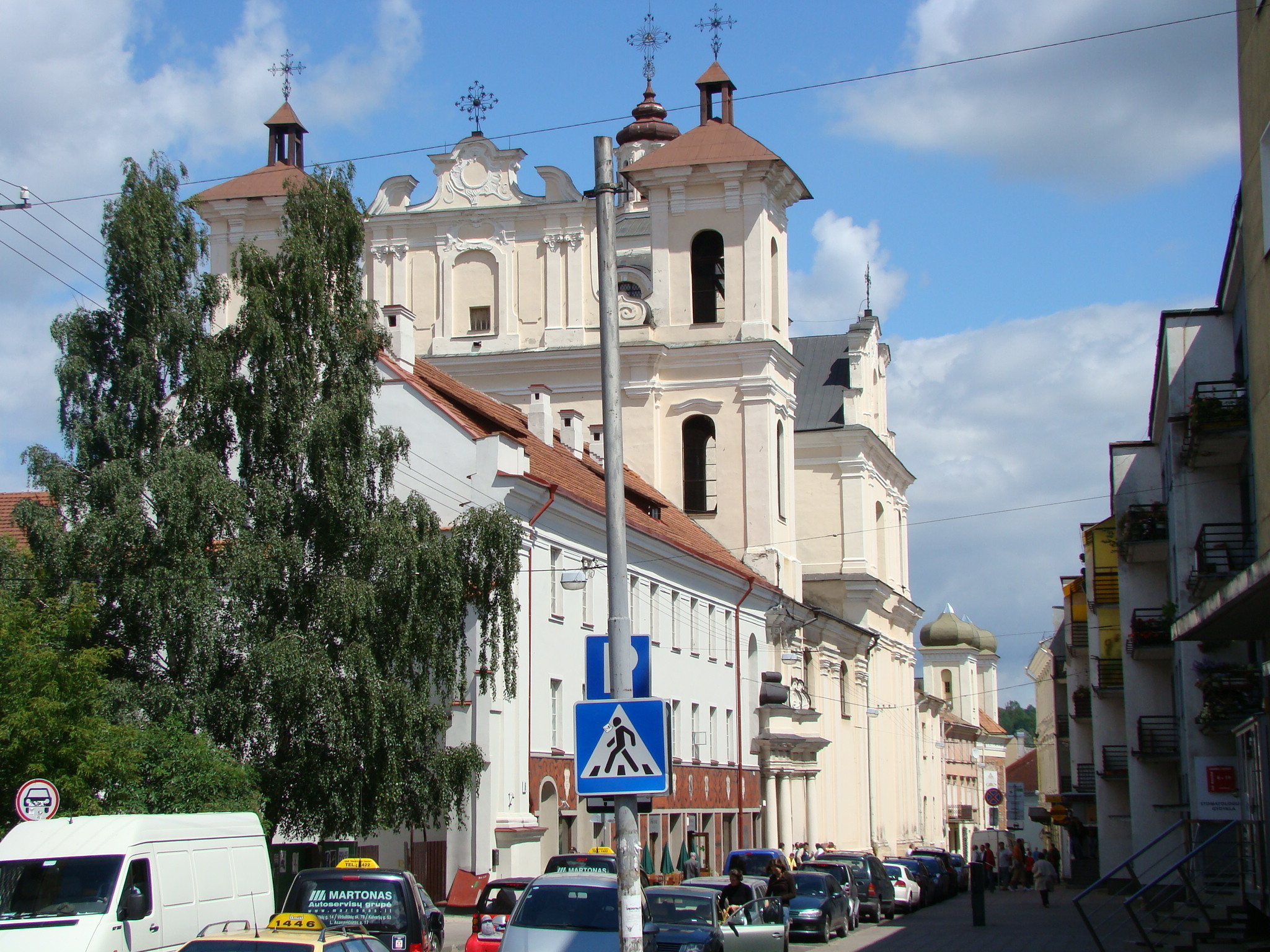
- Dominikonų Street in July 2007
- Native name: Dominikonų gatvė (Lithuanian)
- Former name(s): Dominikańska, Sw. Duska, Blagoveshchenskaya (Russian: Благовещенская)
- Length: 290 m (950 ft)
- Location: Vilnius, Lithuania
- Postal code: LT-01131, LT-01517

Dominikonų Street (literally, "Dominican Street"; Lithuanian: Dominikonų gatvė) is one of the oldest and central streets in the Vilnius Old Town, connecting Trakų Street and Šv. Jono Street.

Notable landmarks are situated in once one of the most ornate Vilnius' streets, including Dominican Church of the Holy Spirit, Sanctuary of the Divine Mercy and historical palaces of Lithuanian nobility.

== Gallery ==
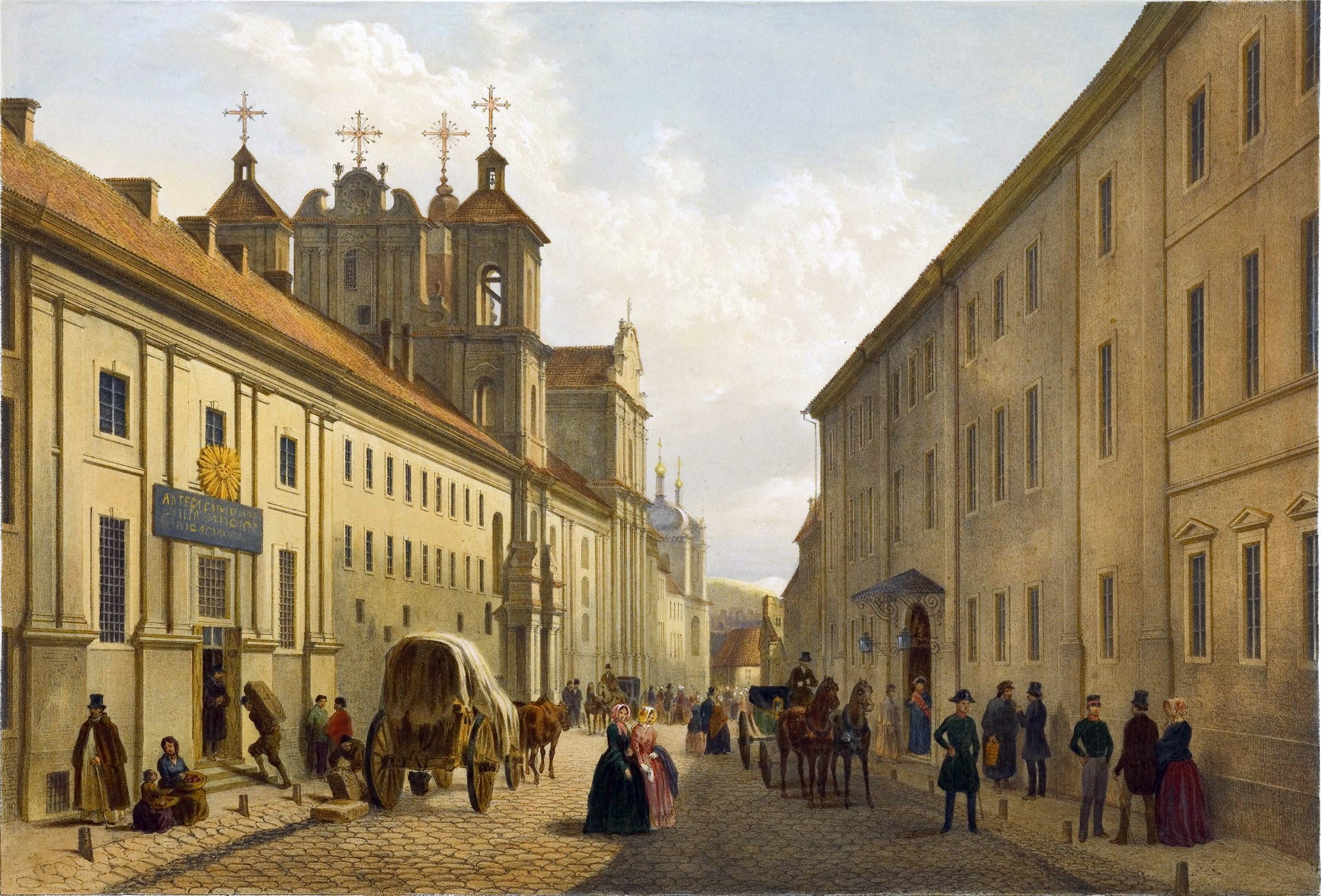
Street in the 19th century

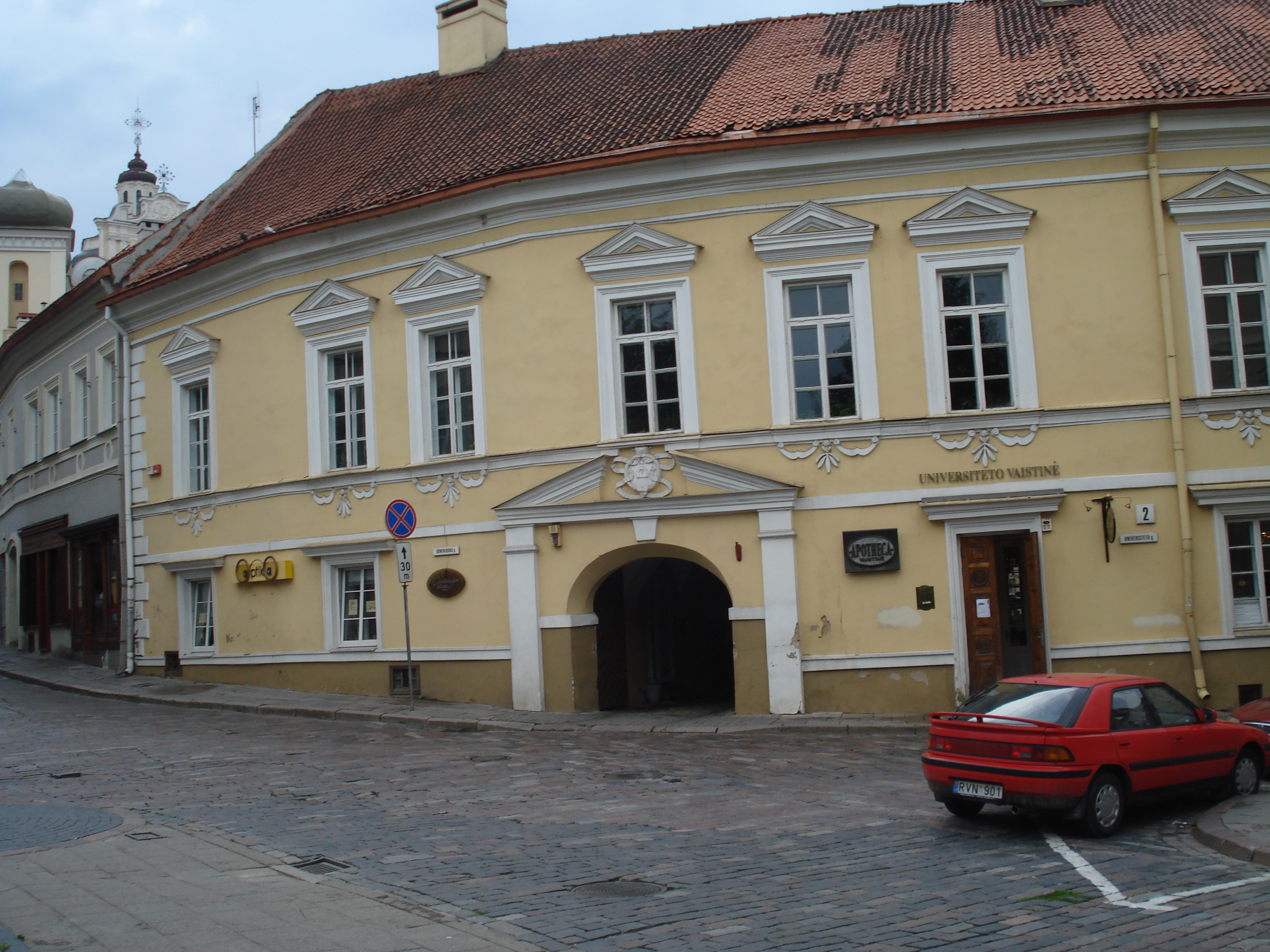
Bžostovskiai Palace

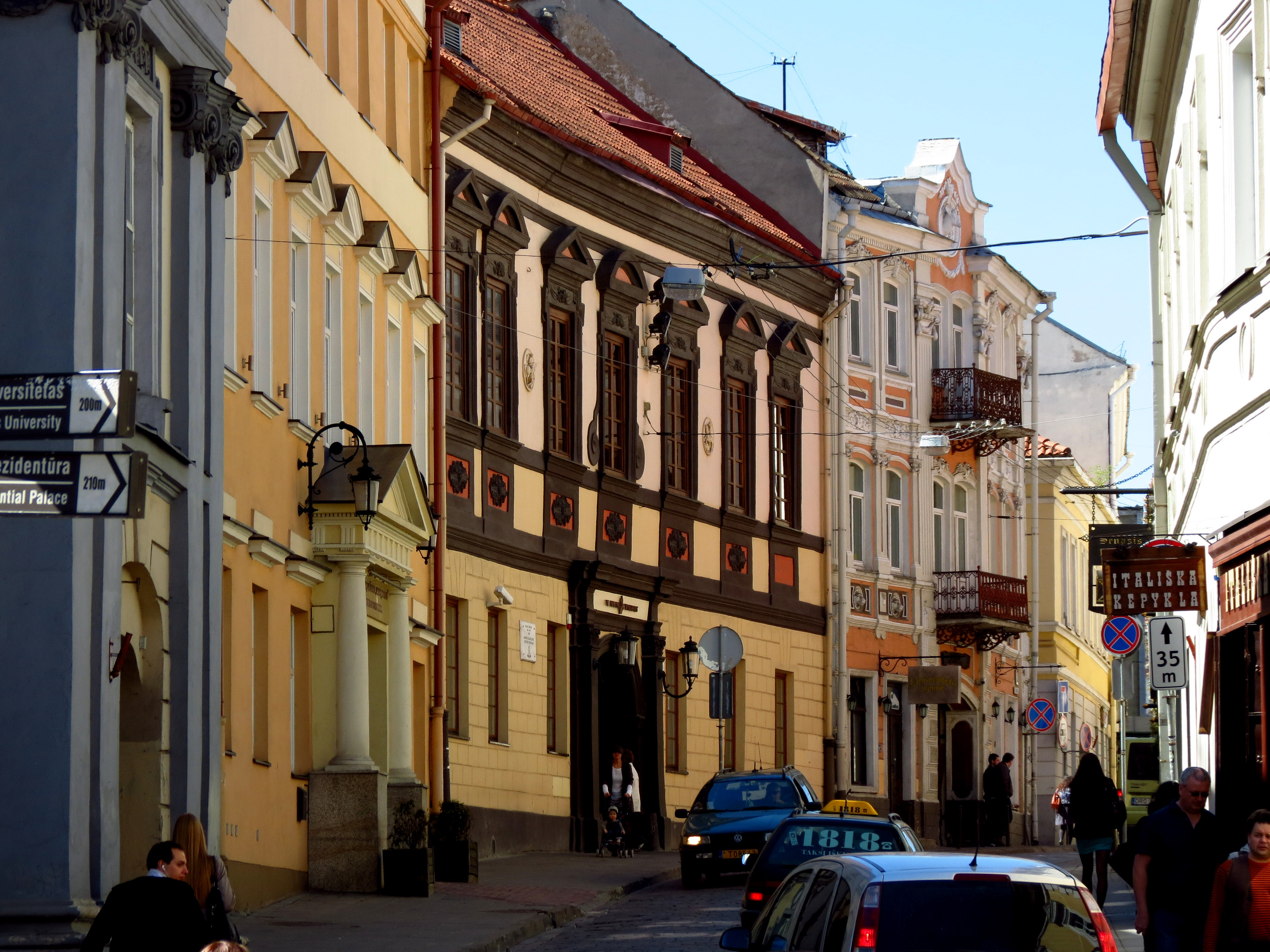
Street view with historical buildings
