= Lithuanian Art Society =

Society of Lithuanian artists (1907–1914)

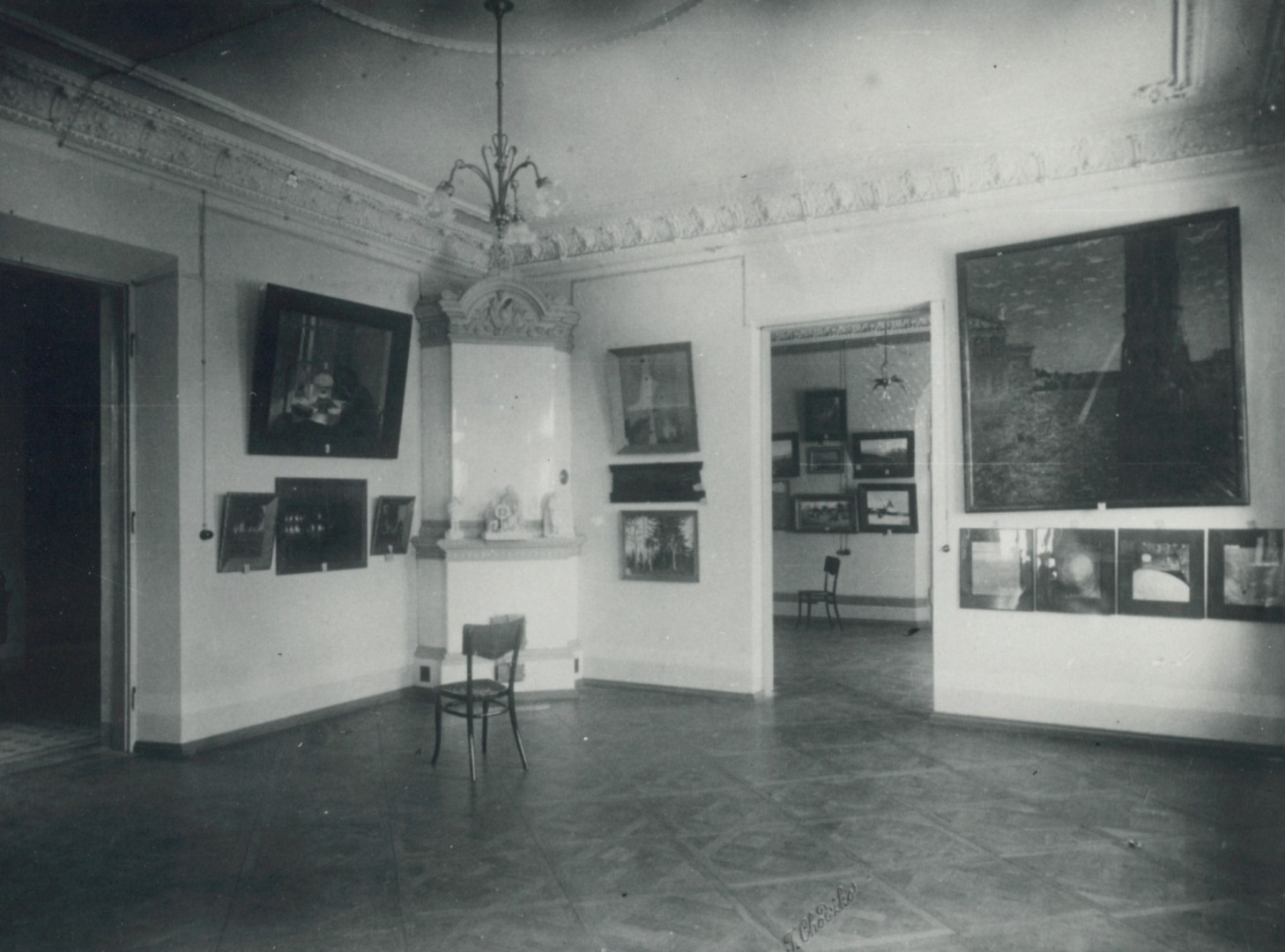
View of the First Lithuanian Art Exhibition

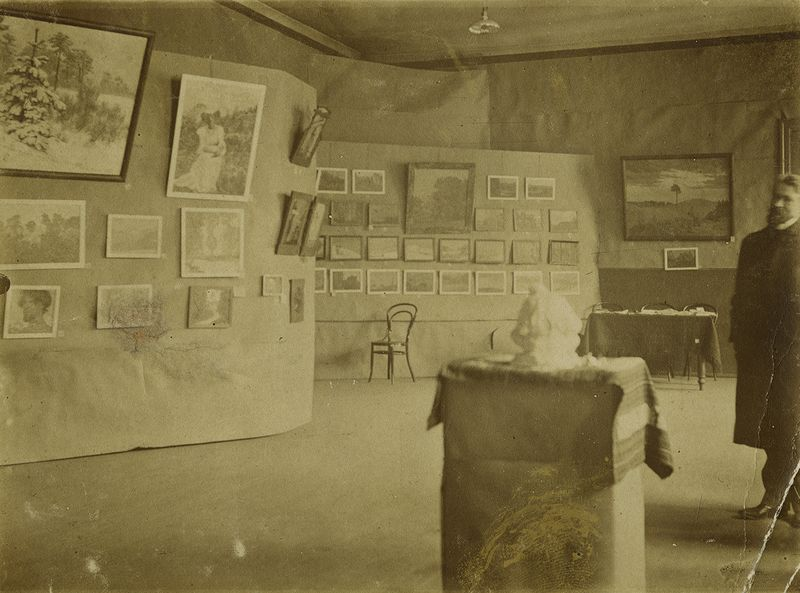
Annual exhibition in 1910

The Lithuanian Art Society (Lithuanian: Lietuvių dailės draugija) was a society that organized Lithuanian art exhibitions and supported Lithuanian artists. Based in Vilnius (then part of the Russian Empire), it was active from 1907 until the outbreak of World War I in 1914. It was chaired by painter Antanas Žmuidzinavičius. The society was established after the first Lithuanian art exhibition was successfully organized in early 1907.

The society continued to organize annual exhibitions that displayed works both by professional and folk artists. Influenced by the Arts and Crafts movement, the society paid great attention to Lithuanian folk art, which was increasingly seen as an expression of the Lithuanian character. In 1912, the society published an album of drawings of Lithuanian crosses, column shrines, and roofed poles, which is considered the first study of Lithuanian folk art. The society was also instrumental in preserving the art of Mikalojus Konstantinas Čiurlionis and organized his first solo exhibitions in 1911 and 1913. The society collected works by other artists and worked with the Lithuanian Scientific Society to establish a Lithuanian art museum (plans failed due to World War I). The collection was transferred to the present-day M. K. Čiurlionis National Art Museum in 1920.

== First exhibition ==
=== Background and preparations ===
After the closure of Vilnius University in 1832, Lithuania did not have any art schools until the Vilnius Drawing School was founded by Ivan Trutnev in 1866. Banker Józef Montwiłł established another drawing school in 1893. However, these schools were geared towards preparing artists needed in crafts and industry as well as art teachers for schools. Therefore, aspiring artists had to seek further education abroad, mostly in Poland and Russia. Lithuanian cultural life was further suppressed during the Lithuanian press ban, which was lifted in 1904. The idea to establish an organization that would unite the dispersed Lithuanian artists, support them financially, and promote their work was first raised by sculptor Petras Rimša in the daily Vilniaus žinios on 6 April 1906. The first step would be organizing a Lithuanian art exhibition. The idea was met with approval by Antanas Žmuidzinavičius (then living in Paris), Antanas Jaroševičius (then living in Kazan), Gabrielė Petkevičaitė-Bitė, Kazimierz Stabrowski from Warsaw, and others.

In summer 1906, Žmuidzinavičius returned to Vilnius and started gathering the organizational committee. The committee was established in October and elected Jonas Basanavičius as its chairman. Other members included Žmuidzinavičius, Petras Vileišis, Antanas Vileišis, Jonas Vileišis, Juozapas Kukta, Vladas Mironas, and Kazys Puida. The committee sent out invitations to various Lithuanian artists and societies to send exhibits. Priests and provincial intelligentsia were asked to send the best examples of Lithuanian folk art. Information was also sent to the periodicals in Russia, Poland, United States, France, and England.

=== Exhibition ===
The exhibition was organized in the home of Petras Vileišis – the Vileišis Palace in Antakalnis suburb. The entire second floor (six rooms) were rented for 400 rubles. The collected exhibits were selected and organized by Mikalojus Konstantinas Čiurlionis, Antanas Žmuidzinavičius, and Petras Rimša. The exhibition catalog was printed in Lithuanian, Polish, and Russian. The opening ceremony took place on 9 January 1907 [O.S. 27 December 1906]. It was attended by various officials and guests, including a representative of the General Governor of Vilnius, Governor of Vilnius Dmitry Lyubimov, and bishop Eduard von der Ropp. The ceremony was held in the Lithuanian language with only brief translations to Russian to accommodate foreign guests. The Polish press criticized the event because it did not use Polish. The ceremony included a speech by Basanavičius and performances by Kanklės of Vilnius choir directed by Juozas Tallat-Kelpša. Two days after the opening, Basanavičius withdrew from the organizational committee as he disagreed with the decision to invite bishop von der Ropp.

The exhibition featured 242 works by 23 professional artists—including oil and watercolor paintings, drawings, architectural projects, and sculptures—and 206 works by folk artists. It closed on 1 March [O.S. 15 February] 1907 and was attended by more than 2,000 visitors, with the exhibition receiving substantial attention in the press. Professional artists included Čiurlionis (who publicly exhibited his works for the first time), Žmuidzinavičius, Rimša, Petras Kalpokas, Juozas Zikaras, Kazimierz Stabrowski, Antanas Jaroševičius, and Władysław Leszczyński. The exhibition was successful in selling its exhibits, particularly the folk art. Petras Vileišis purchased a sculpture by Rimša depicting a Lithuanian woman teaching her son to read (a symbol of clandestine schools that were active during the Lithuanian press ban) for 300 rubles.

== Art society ==
Participation in the society's annual exhibitions
#	Opening date (O.S.)	Professional		Folk		Visitors	Revenue^{a}
#	Opening date (O.S.)	Artists	Works	Artists^{b}	Works	Visitors	Revenue^{a}
1	27 December 1906	23	242	68	206	2,000	1,975
2	28 February 1908	14	77	23	162	1,509	232
3	12 April 1909	12	94	32	186	722	264
4	2 March 1910	11	105	75	204	1,126	404
5	19 March 1911	13	130	156	393	1,017	1,264
6	12 May 1912	15	230	109	263	1,423	500
7	1913	12	117	158	473		
8	1914	12	133			1,200	
^{a} Revenue in Russian rubles for sold exhibits^{b} Numbers inaccurate as not all artists were known or were listed under collector's name

Encouraged by the success of the first exhibition, the organizers established the Lithuanian Art Society. Its statute was drafted in spring, but the founding meeting took place only on 15 September [O.S. 2 September] 1907. It was attended by 15 people, who elected the first five-member board: chairman Žmuidzinavičius, secretary Jonas Vileišis, treasurer Sofija Gimbutaitė (Zofia Gimbutt), and members Čiurlionis and Rimša. The society's program was highly influenced by the Kraków Society of Friends of Fine Arts and the Polish Applied Arts Society. The number of society's members steadily grew from 19 in 1907 to 281 in 1913 and 369 in 1914, of which only 21 were professional artists.

Before World War I, the society organized seven annual Lithuanian art exhibitions in Vilnius. Four of them were later moved to Kaunas (1908, 1911, 1914) and Riga (1910). In additional to artists who exhibited in 1907, later exhibitions displayed works by Adomas Varnas, Kazimieras Šklėrius, Antoni Wiwulski, Paulius Galaunė, Jonas Mackevičius, Ignas Šlapelis, and Vilius Jomantas. The exhibitions were subject to Tsarist censorship and in a couple instances, paintings were removed by policemen or the society was not allowed to sell postcards with reproductions.

=== Support of folk art ===
Influenced by the Arts and Crafts movement, the society paid great attention to Lithuanian folk art, which was increasingly seen as an expression of the Lithuanian character. The annual exhibitions consistently featured numerous works by Lithuanian folk artists, but most of the attention was paid to textiles (sashes, aprons, towels, etc.) and exhibited very few items made of wood. Overall, the folk art was varied and, in addition to truly traditional art, included exhibits by professional or almost professional artists that sometimes had cosmopolitan elements or features borrowed from mass-produced items. In 1913, the society participated in two separate folk art exhibitions – the folk art and small craft exhibition in Vilnius and at the Second All-Russian Folk Art Exhibition organized in Saint Petersburg. In Saint Petersburg, the society exhibited about a thousand items and was awarded the exhibition's silver medal. Some exhibits were acquired by several Russian museums and are still held by the Russian Museum of Ethnography. The society was also invited to participate at the planned Russian handcraft exhibition at the Wertheim store in Berlin in January 1914.

In 1912, the society published an album of drawings by Antanas Jaroševičius. The drawings were of Lithuanian crosses, column shrines, and roofed poles – elements of Lithuanian folk architecture and sculpture. The introduction was written by Jonas Basanavičius; the book's design was prepared by Žmuidzinavičius. It is considered the first study of Lithuanian folk art. It was also an important development in changing attitudes about these folk architectural elements – the Catholic clergy considered them of low artistic value and rejected them due to remnants of pagan Lithuanian symbols. Overall, the promotion of folk art encouraged villagers to continue their traditional craft.

=== Other activities ===
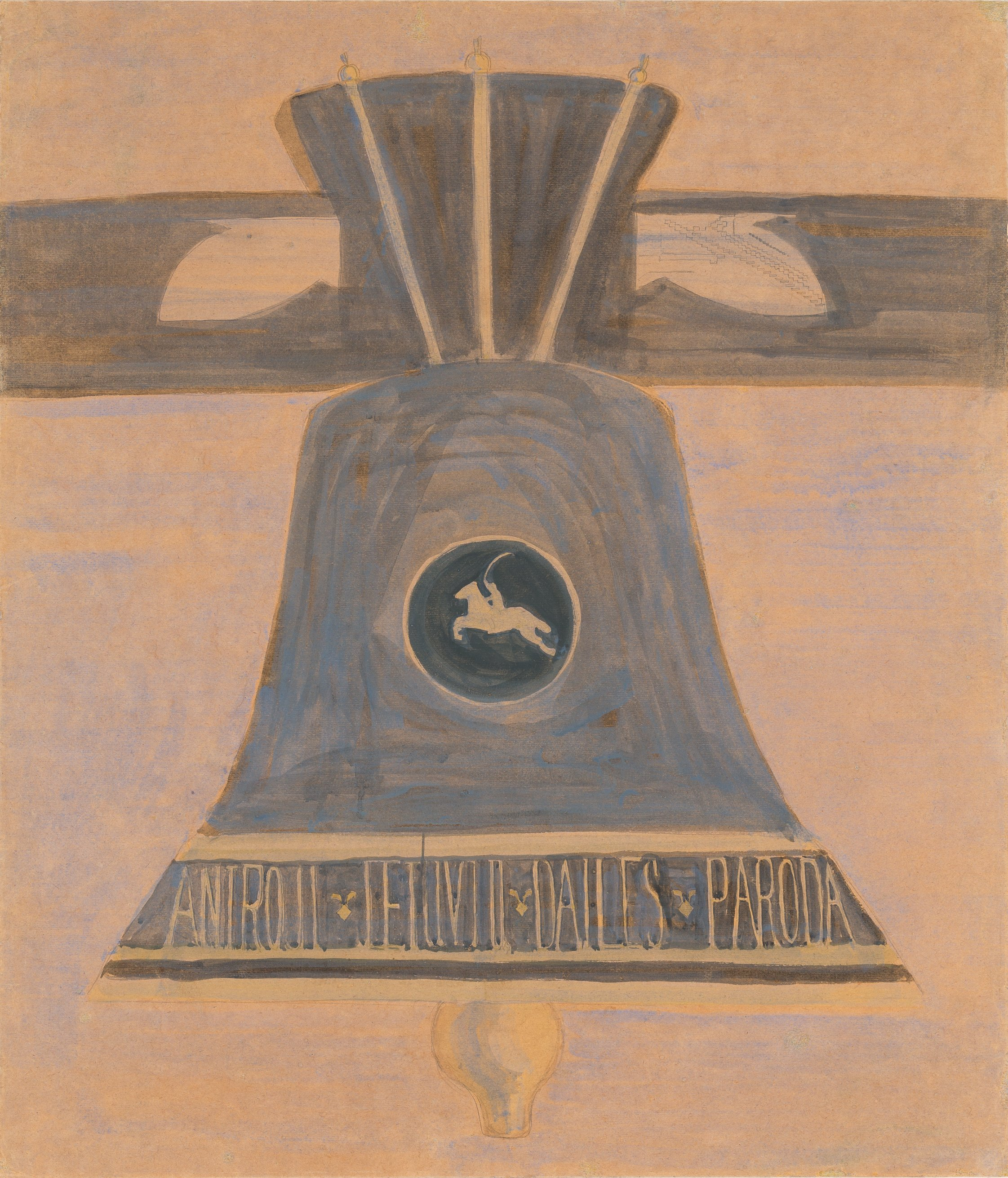
Poster project of the Second Lithuanian Art Exhibition with a bell and Lithuanian Vytis, painted by Mikalojus Konstantinas Čiurlionis in 1908

The society, in collaboration with the Lithuanian Scientific Society, sought to build the National House (Tautos namai), which would house the Lithuanian art museum, in addition to a library, archive, and conference rooms. In 1908, Žmuidzinavičius traveled to the United States to raise funds for the house among Lithuanian Americans. In his absence, Čiurlionis was acting chairman and the society started organizing music competitions.

By 1912, the society had amassed a collection of about 400 works by professional artists and about 1,000 works by folk artists. It also safeguarded works by Mikalojus Konstantinas Čiurlionis (died in 1911) and was instrumental in preserving them. The society organized his posthumous solo exhibition, which displayed 265 of his works in Vilnius, Saint Petersburg, and Moscow. It also organized a permanent exhibition in Vilnius, which was open from 1913 to the end of 1914. During World War I, the collections were evacuated to Moscow. After the Soviet–Lithuanian Peace Treaty in 1920, the works were returned to Lithuania and were deposited with the M. K. Čiurlionis Gallery (now the M. K. Čiurlionis National Art Museum).

The society was briefly revived in 1926–1928, though it continued to officially exist until 1940. During that time, the society published a study on Čiurlionis' works (1927) and Lithuanian folk art (1929). It also organized exhibitions that attempted to branch out to new areas – children's art, posters, and modernist porcelain.

== Bibliography ==
- Aničas, Jonas (2001). Petras Vileišis 1851–1926 (in Lithuanian). Vilnius: Alma littera. ISBN 9986-02-958-9.
- Bialopetravičienė, Laima (2009). "Lietuvių dailės atgimimo šimtmetis" (PDF). Lietuvos dailės muziejaus metraštis (in Lithuanian). 12 (2007). ISSN 1648-6706.
- Budvytis, Vytautas (2012). Jono Basanavičiaus gyvenimas ir veikla Vilniuje 1905-1907 m. (PDF) (Master's thesis) (in Lithuanian). Vytautas Magnus University.
- Čepėnas, Pranas (1977). Naujųjų laikų Lietuvos istorija. Vol. I. Chicago: Dr. Kazio Griniaus Fondas. OCLC 3220435.
- Gaubytė, Margarita (11 October 2017). "Virtuali paroda "Lietuvių dailės draugijai ‒ 110"". Kultūros paveldo skaitmeninimas (in Lithuanian). Lietuvos nacionalinis dailės muziejus.
- Jankevičiūtė, Giedrė (2009). "Lietuvių dailės draugija ne vien per nacionalinio atgimimo prizmę" (PDF). Lietuvos dailės muziejaus metraštis (in Lithuanian). 12 (2007). ISSN 1648-6706.
- Rimkus, Vytenis (2007). "Liaudies menas ir pirmosios lietuvių dailės parodos" (PDF). Acta Academiae Artium Vilnensis (in Lithuanian). 45. ISSN 1392-0316.
- Šatavičiūtė, Lijana (2009). "Lietuvių dailės parodos ir tautiškumo paieškos XX a. pradžios dailiuosiuose amatuose" (PDF). Lietuvos dailės muziejaus metraštis (in Lithuanian). 12 (2007). ISSN 1648-6706.
