= Antanas Jaroševičius =

Lithuanian painter

- Born: 22 July 1870; Skrebotiškis, Kovno Governorate, Russian Empire
- Died: 17 June 1956 (aged 85); Karklynė, Lithuanian SSR
- Occupations: Graphic artist, watercolor painter, teacher

Antanas Jaroševičius (1870–1956) was a Lithuanian painter best known for his album of Lithuanian crosses published in 1912 and life-long interest in Lithuanian folk art.

He graduated from the Baron Stieglitz Academy of Art and Design in Saint Petersburg in 1899 and later taught in Orlov and Kazan until 1920. Despite the long distance, he continued to be involved in Lithuanian cultural life and published various articles in the Lithuanian press. He studied Lithuanian folk art, in particular Lithuanian crosses, during his summer vacations. He participated in the First Exhibition of Lithuanian Art in 1907 and was an active member of the Lithuanian Art Society. In 1912, the society published his album of detailed drawings of Lithuanian crosses – it is considered the first study of Lithuanian folk art. In 1921, Jaroševičius returned to Lithuania and settled on a farm near Giedraičiai. He refused a position at the University of Lithuania and taught art and crafts at the Giedraičiai Progymnasium until 1935 (the school is now named after him). He continued his studies of Lithuanian folk art and encouraged his students to keep the traditions alive. He died in poverty and obscurity in 1956.

== Biography ==
=== Early life and education ===
Jaroševičius was born in the village of Skrebotiškis into a family of a blacksmith. After the Uprising of 1863, the family acquired land and began farming. The family was large – three daughters and six sons. The parents intended to educate Jaroševičius so that he would become a Catholic priest. He received some education at home and at a Russian primary school before attending the Mitau Gymnasium. However, in 1893, Jaroševičius defied his parents and enrolled into the Baron Stieglitz Academy of Art and Design in Saint Petersburg. His parents refused to support him financially. For the first year, he received some support from his neighbor Petras Vileišis and later had to make his own living by tutoring, painting decorations, and taking other assorted jobs. In Saint Petersburg, he met Povilas Višinskis who encouraged Jaroševičius to join the Lithuanian National Revival and start contributing to the illegal Lithuanian press, including Varpas and Lietuvos ūkininkas. Despite difficulties, Jaroševičius graduated with a distinction in 1899 as an art teacher.

=== In Kazan ===
For a year, Jaroševičius worked at the Zimin Furniture Factory as a designer. His designs were exhibited by the firm at the Paris Exhibition of 1900 and were awarded a silver medal. He worked as a teacher at a girls' gymnasium in Orlov, Vyatka Governorate in 1902–1905 and lectured at Kazan schools and the Kazan Polytechnic Institute in 1905–1920. Despite the long distance, Jaroševičius continued to be involved in Lithuanian cultural life. He continued to write to the Lithuanian press mostly on topics of art and Lithuanian folk art. His articles were published in Lietuvių laikraštis, Vilniaus žinios, Lietuvos ūkininkas, Viltis, Aušrinė, and others. His writings inspired other Lithuanian artists, including Petras Rimša and Adomas Varnas, to study Lithuanian folk art. He also published two Lithuanian-language booklets, Kam aš reikalingas? (Who needs me?) in 1905 which expressed his nostalgia for the homeland and Darbininkų rūpesniai ir vargai. (Brolių laiškai) [Workers' Worries and Hardships. (Letters from the Brothers)] in 1913. He supported the idea of the First Exhibition of Lithuanian Art in 1907 and exhibited 19 of his works. He later participated in each annual exhibition of the Lithuanian Art Society. He illustrated books for children, including a primer by Klemensas Skabeika and a book of tales by Matas Šalčius. He also created vignettes and initials for the Vairas journal and created some of the first Lithuanian postcards.

=== Return to Lithuania ===
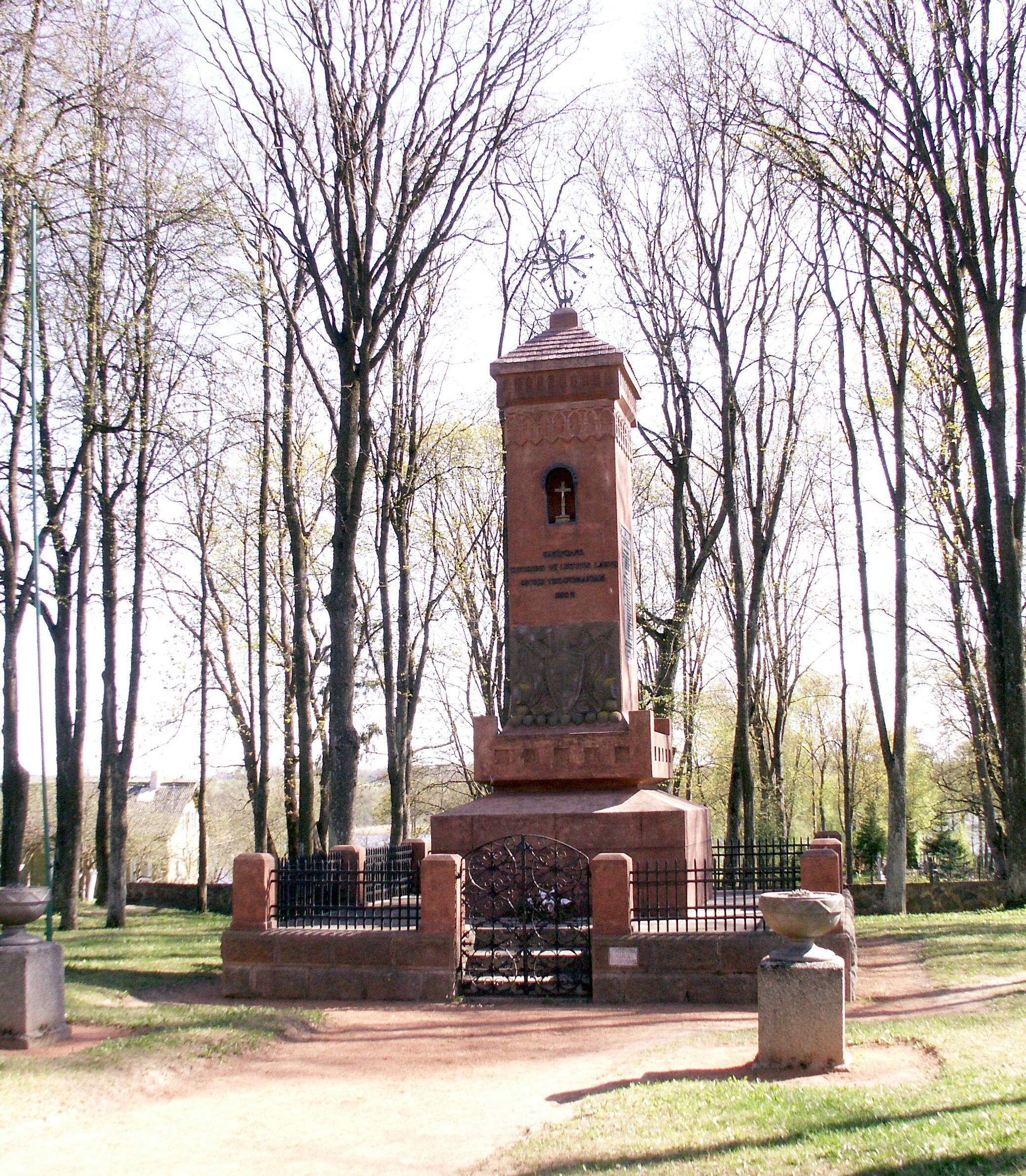
Monument in Giedraičiai to fallen Lithuanian soldiers designed by Jaroševičius

During World War I, he was a representative of the Lithuanian Society for the Relief of War Sufferers in Kazan and assisted Lithuanian war refugees. In 1921, Jaroševičius returned to Lithuania and settled in Karklynė near Giedraičiai. He bought a farm and taught art and crafts at the Giedraičiai Progymnasium until 1935. He was invited to teach at the University of Lithuania, but he refused. In 1927, he designed a monument to Lithuanian soldiers who died in the Battle of Giedraičiai during the Żeligowski's Mutiny in 1920. The monument was built in 1928 and was one of the very few Lithuanian monuments that were not destroyed during the Soviet era.

He continued to care about the Lithuanian folk art and publish articles on the topic. He lamented the decline of traditional arts as people purchased more and more of the mass-produced products and tried to encourage his students and all young people to continue the traditions. In 1939, he published a booklet Dailieji medžio darbeliai (Fine Woodwork) with examples of small folk-inspired projects (e.g. hangers for towels, calendars, or thermometers). His two other works on Lithuanian folk ornaments and Lithuanian exiles in Kazan remained unpublished.

=== Later life ===
During the Holocaust in Lithuania, Jaroševičius hid Esfira Gutmanaitė, a young Jewish woman, on his farm from fall 1941 to fall 1943. For this, he was posthumously awarded the Life Saving Cross by the President of Lithuania in 2016. His son and adopted son died serving in the Red Army in 1945. Jaroševičius traveled on foot to Latvia and paid large sums of money to have his son's grave exhumed so he could see for himself that it was indeed his son buried there. His farm was nationalized by a Soviet kolkhoz leaving the elderly artist with an orchard and a small plot of arable land. Affected by glaucoma, Jaroševičius died in poverty and obscurity in 1956.

His widow donated his archives to the Lithuanian National Museum of Art which organized exhibitions dedicated to Jaroševičius in 1970 and 1990 and published a catalog of his works in 1990. The Lithuanian National Museum of Art has about 200 of his works. His other works are held by the M. K. Čiurlionis National Art Museum. The gymnasium in Giedraičiai was renamed in his honor in 1990.

== Works ==
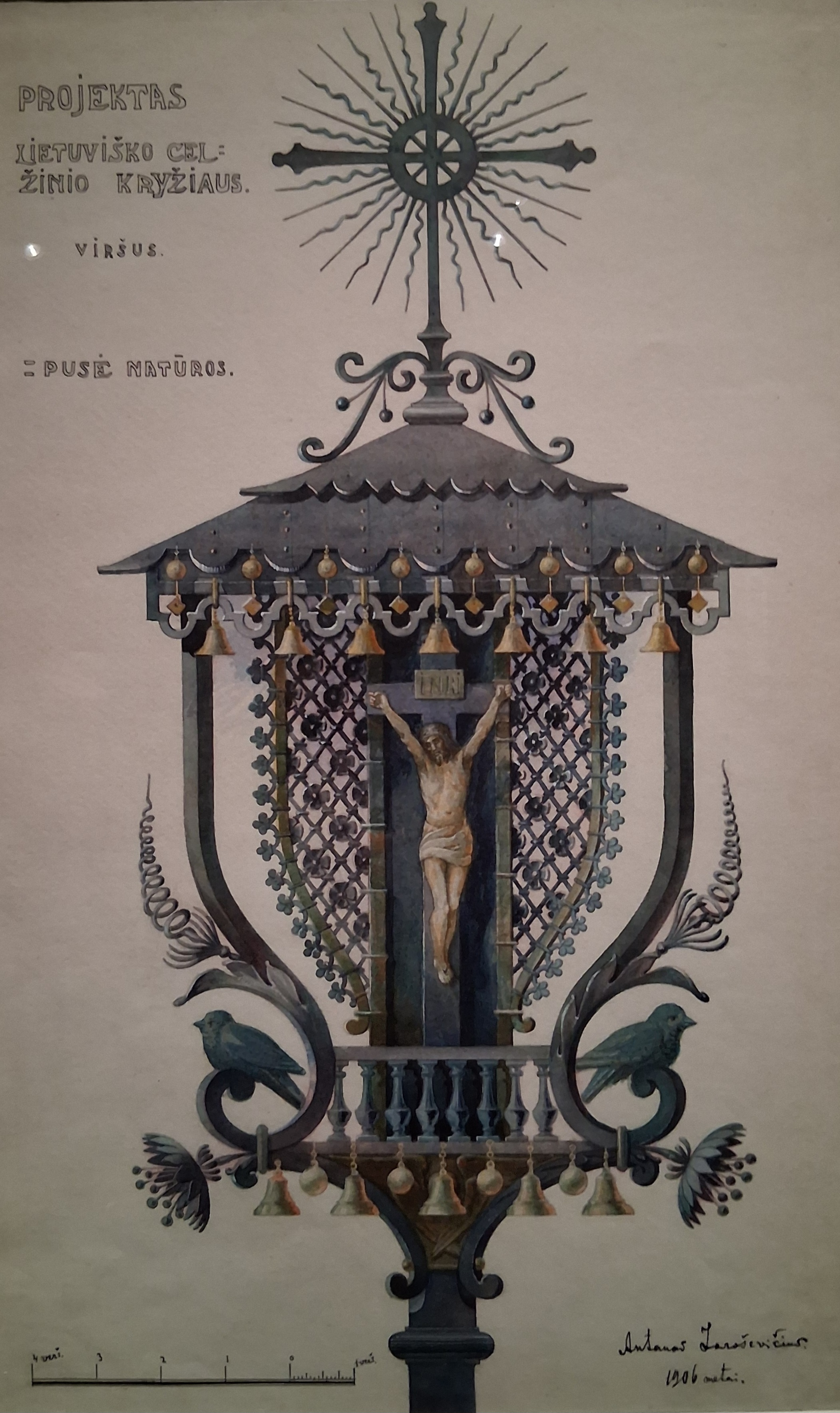
Design of a chapel cross from 1906

Jaroševičius is best known for his work documenting Lithuanian crosses. Every year from 1904 to 1911, Jaroševičius returned to Lithuania for the summer vacation. He travelled across Lithuania (mainly areas around Šiauliai and Panevėžys) and took photos, made drawings, and otherwise collected samples of Lithuanian folk art. In particular, he was interested in Lithuanian crosses and decorative architectural elements of houses. Based on this material, the Lithuanian Art Society published an album of drawings by Jaroševičius of Lithuanian crosses, column shrines, and roofed poles. The album had 79 pages usually with drawings of two crosses. The text was in Lithuanian and French. The drawings (as opposed to photographs) helped to emphasize and highlight details. The introduction was written by Jonas Basanavičius; book's design was prepared by Antanas Žmuidzinavičius. It is considered the first study of the Lithuanian folk art. It was also an important development in changing attitudes about these folk architectural elements – the Catholic clergy considered them of low artistic value and rejected them due to remnants of pagan Lithuanian symbols. Jaroševičius' drawings became popular and influenced future folk artists who copied designs from his album.

He is also known as a graphic artist, illustrator of various books and periodicals. Additionally, he painted watercolor scenes of nature, landscapes, views of traditional Lithuanian dwelings. These watercolors are colorful and cheerful.
