= Maculewicz =

Maculewicz is a Polish surname. Notable people with the surname include:

- Cyprian Maculewicz (1830–1906), Polish-Lithuanian architect and painter
- Henryk Maculewicz (born 1950), Polish football player
- Jan Maculewicz (1862–1932), Roman Catholic priest and poet
- Jerzy Maculewicz (born 1955), Roman Catholic prelate of Polish descent
- Kinga Maculewicz-De La Fuente (born 1978), French volleyball player of Polish descent
