= Józef Montwiłł =

Polish-Lithuanian social worker, bank owner and philanthropist (1850–1911)

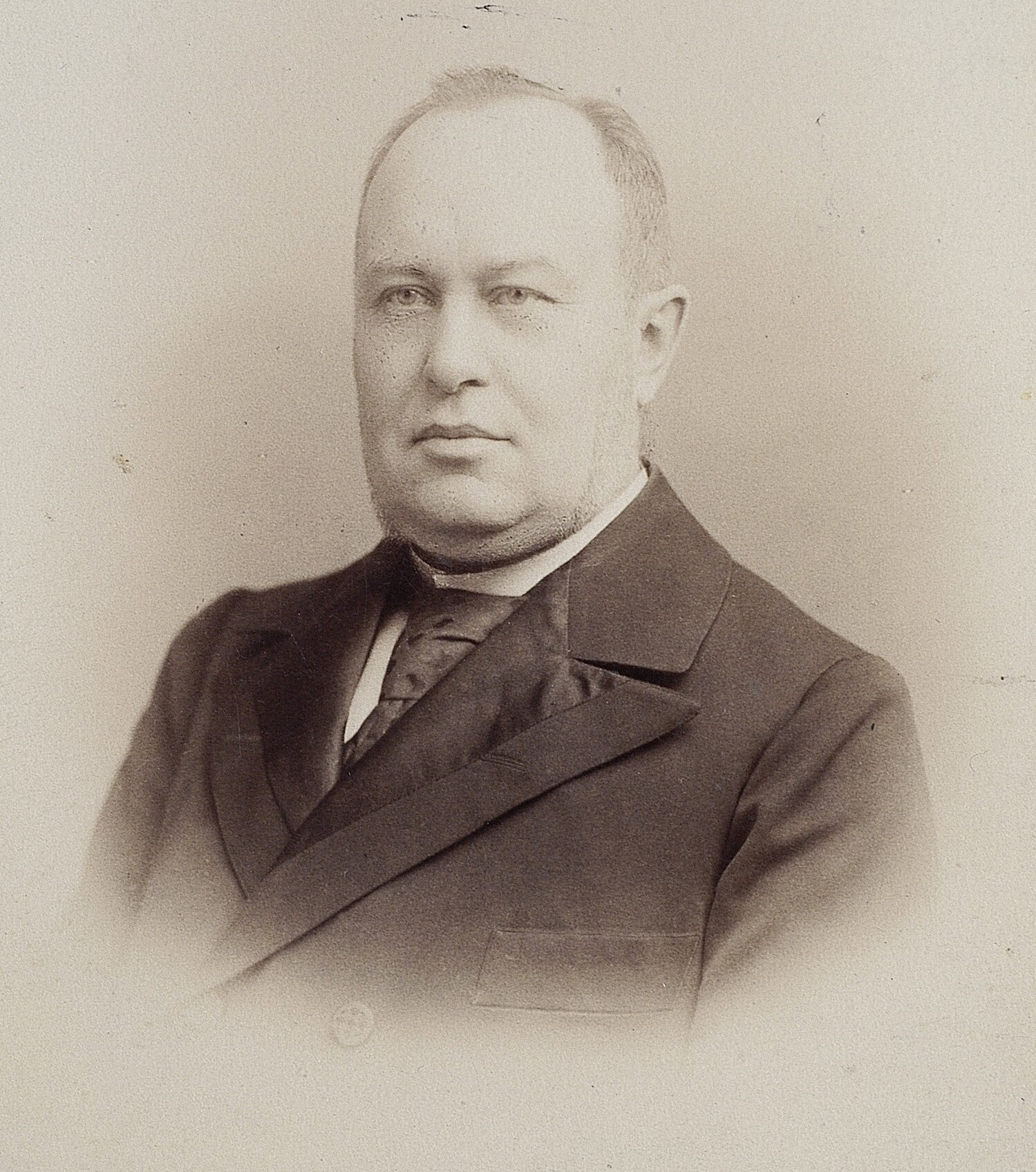
- Józef Montwiłł, 1895
- Born: 9 March 1850; Mitėniškiai (now Kėdainiai district, Lithuania)
- Died: 7 February 1911 (aged 60)
- Occupations: Bank owner, philanthropist
- Parents: Stanisław Maciej Montwiłł (father); Aleksandra née Dowgiałło (mother)

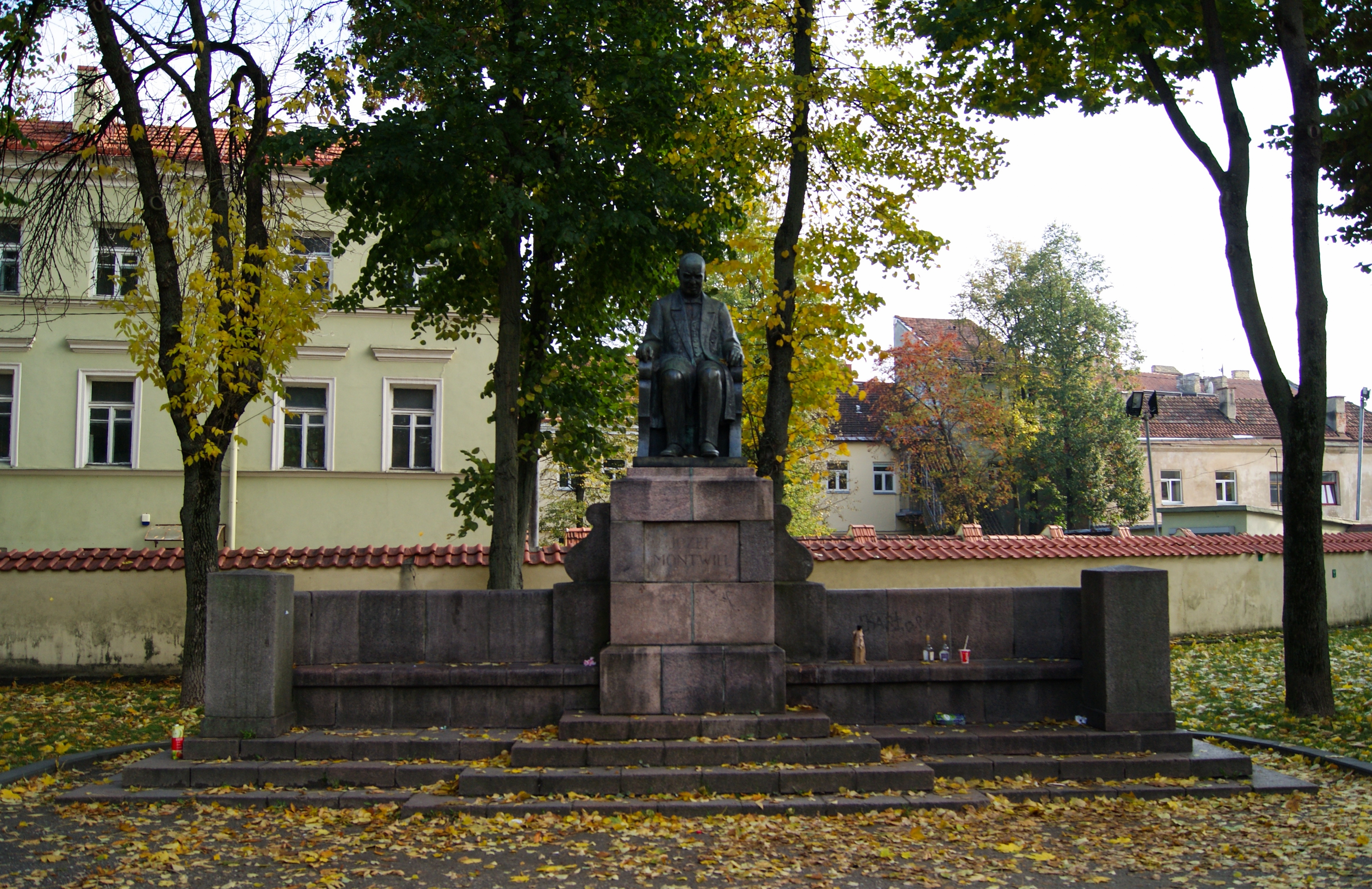
Józef Montwiłł statue in Vilnius

Józef Montwiłł (Lithuanian: Juozapas Montvila; 9 March 1850 – 7 February 1911) was a Polish–Lithuanian nobleman, who was a bank owner and philanthropist, notable for the many social societies he founded. A descendant of a noble Lithuanian family, Montwiłł inherited a significant fortune, which he further increased through banking and investment. He financed numerous courses for the poor, among them, was a class of painting and arts, run by (among others) Józef Bałzukiewicz and Ivan Trutnev, from which graduated a renowned Lithuanian artist Juozas Zikaras.

In 1898, Montwiłł also financed a monument to Adam Mickiewicz in Vilnius, designed by Tadeusz Stryjeński. As the tsarist authorities did not allow the monument to be placed in open space, it was built inside Church of St. Johns. Montwiłł also created the Lutnia Artistic Society and financed the construction of the society's theatre, in currently Lithuanian National Drama Theatre. Among other societies, he formed and financed the Society of Friends of Science, one of the founding members of the Polish Academy of Sciences.

Montwiłł also financed the creation of a Polish school in Vilnius (1907), the Panevėžys city hall; built already after his death, and the Polish Theatre in Vilnius (in modern times the Old Theatre of Vilnius). He died in 1911, and was buried at the Rasos Cemetery. His tomb, designed by Zygmunt Otto, was decorated with a sculpture of an angel. Although vandalized in recent times, the tomb remains there. In 1935, a monument to Montwiłł was erected in front of the Church of the Assumption of the Blessed Virgin Mary. A monument in his honour was built in the square, located in the former Franciscan cemetery on the Trakų Street, Vilnius.

In modern times, the Polish Culture in Lithuania Fund (Polish: Fundacja Kultury Polskiej na Litwie im. Józefa Montwiłła) has adopted Montwiłł as its patron.
