= Brzostowski Palace =

Building in Vilnius, Lithuania

- Bžostovskių rūmai
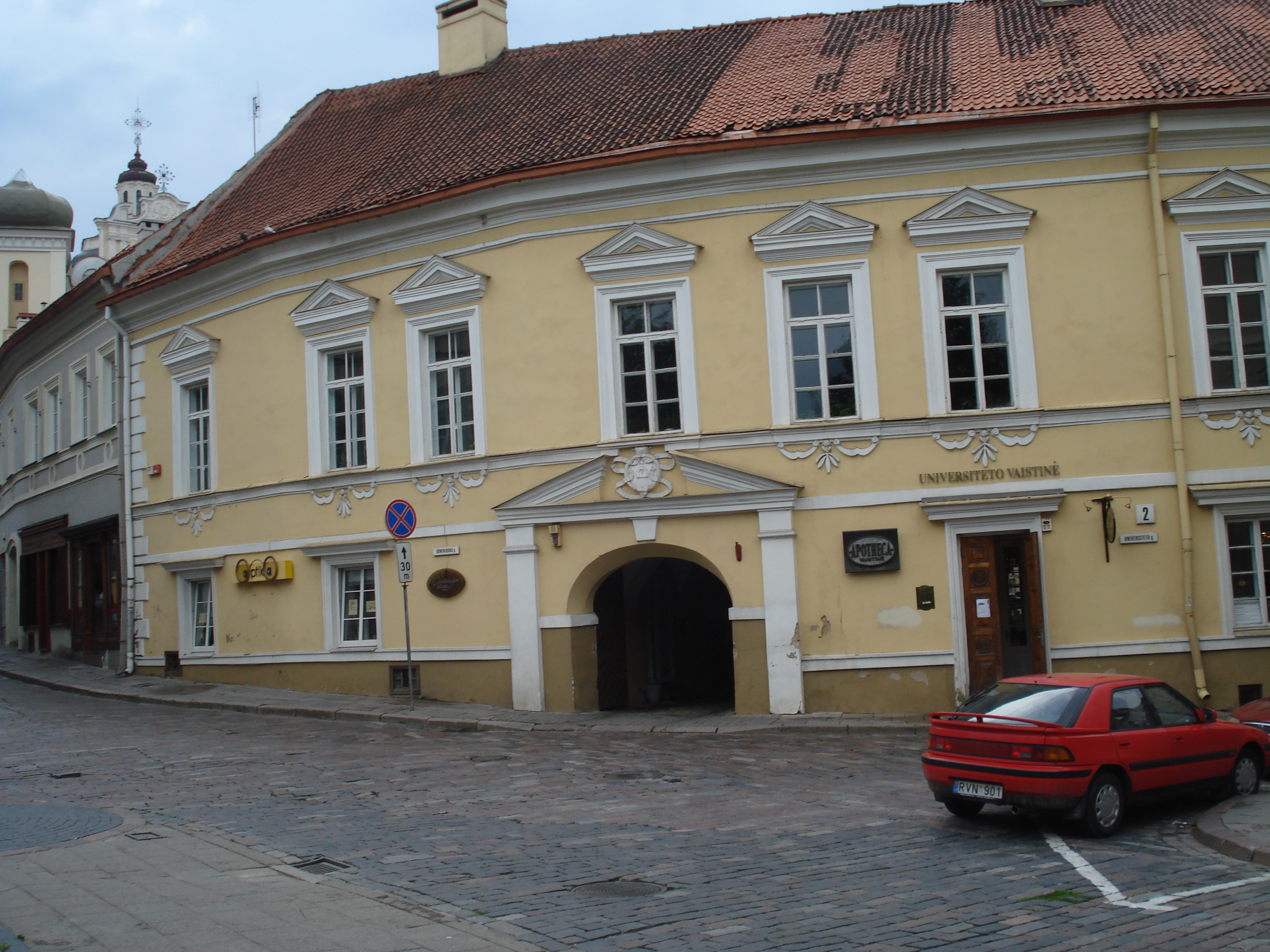
- Main façade of Brzostowski Palace

General information
- Architectural style: Baroque, Neoclassical
- Location: Vilnius Old Town, Vilnius, Lithuania, Universiteto Street 2 / Dominikonų Street 18
- Coordinates: 54°40′54″N 25°17′10″E
- Completed: 17th century
- Renovated: 1761; 1888–1890
- Client: Cyprian Paweł Brzostowski

Design and construction
- Architects: Carlo Spampani (1761 reconstruction); Cyprian Maculewicz (1888–1890 renovation)

Brzostowski Palace (Lithuanian: Bžostovskių rūmai) is a historic palace in the Old Town of Vilnius, Lithuania, located at the intersection of Dominikonų, Universiteto and Šv. Jono streets. Originally developed in the 17th century as the residence of the noble Brzostowski family, was purchased by Cyprian Paweł Brzostowski, Voivode of Trakai. The palace acquired much of its present architectural character during an extensive reconstruction in the 1760s, commissioned by Paweł Ksawery Brzostowski, according to the project of Carlo Spampani. The renovations included the remodelling of its façades and the introduction of Rococo interior decorations.

The palace was acquired by Jakub Ignacy Nagórski in 1772 and subsequently passed to the Ogiński family in 1802. Further alterations were carried out in 1888–1890 under architect Cyprian Maculewicz. In 1957 and 1982, the palace was adapted for housing flats. It currently houses a pharmacy and individual flats.
