= Juozas Zikaras =

Lithuanian sculptor and artist

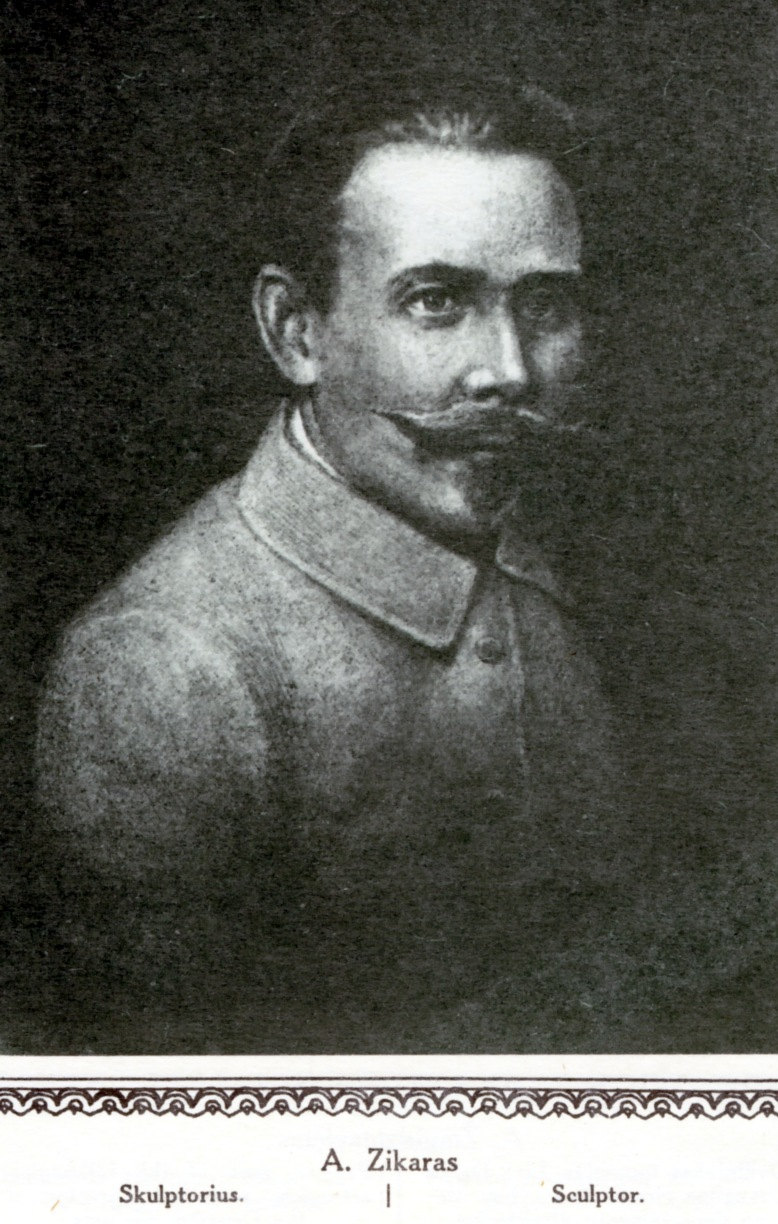
Juozas Zikaras, from Lietuvos albumas (1921)

Juozas Zikaras(November 18, 1881 – November 10, 1944) was a Lithuanian sculptor and artist, who created the design for pre-war Lithuanian litas coins. He is considered to be one of the first professional Lithuanian sculptors.

== Biography ==
He was born November 18, 1881, in the village of Paliūkai near Panevėžys in Lithuania (then part of the Russian Empire). Between 1904 and 1906 he studied fine arts at the Vilnius-based Lev Trutnev Drawing School, as well as classes given by Józef Montwiłł. Surpassing many of his fellow art students, Zikaras in 1907 went to St. Petersburg to continue his studies at the Drawing School of the Imperial Society for the Encouragement of the Arts. In 1910, after three years in St. Petersburg, he was accepted to the Imperial Academy of Arts, from where he graduated in 1915, already after the outbreak of World War I. Shortly before finishing his diploma work he was drafted into the Russian army. However, he was not dispatched to the front and instead was able to receive a silver award of his alma mater the following year. Demobilized, he remained in Russia and taught drawing at various schools to make a living.

In 1918 he returned to Panevėžys, where he started working in a secondary school and pedagogical seminary. In 1929 he moved to Kaunas, where he started heading the studio of sculpture at the Academy of Fine Arts. He held that post until the Soviet occupation of Lithuania in 1940. He continued to give classes of drawing during the German occupation and after the second Soviet occupation he was proposed a professor's seat at the academy.

However he was accused by NKGB (the name of the Soviet secret police at the time) that his sons were with the "Forest Brothers". He could not stand interrogations, and on November 10, 1944, he committed suicide in Kaunas.

== Legacy ==
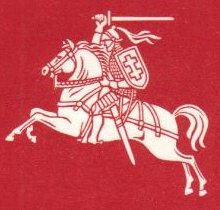
Zikaras design of the Vytis, the coat of arms of Lithuania

He and his wife Anelė had four children, three sons and one daughter. The sons emigrated to the Western countries after World War II. One, Teisutis, became an acclaimed sculptor in Melbourne, Australia. The daughter, Alytė, remained in Lithuania and continued to live in her family's house in Kaunas. Thanks to her efforts a lot of Zikaras' works survived the Soviet occupation. In 1959 she established a small exhibition in her father's workshop. Executing her will, the whole family house was turned into a museum in 2000. Another museum dedicated to Zikaras is located in the house where Zikaras spent his childhood. This house was turned into a museum in 1972. His descendants immigrated to the United States, via New York (Ellis Island), and Boston (East Boston Immigration Station). Some of his family members live in Massachusetts, and Connecticut today.

== Works ==
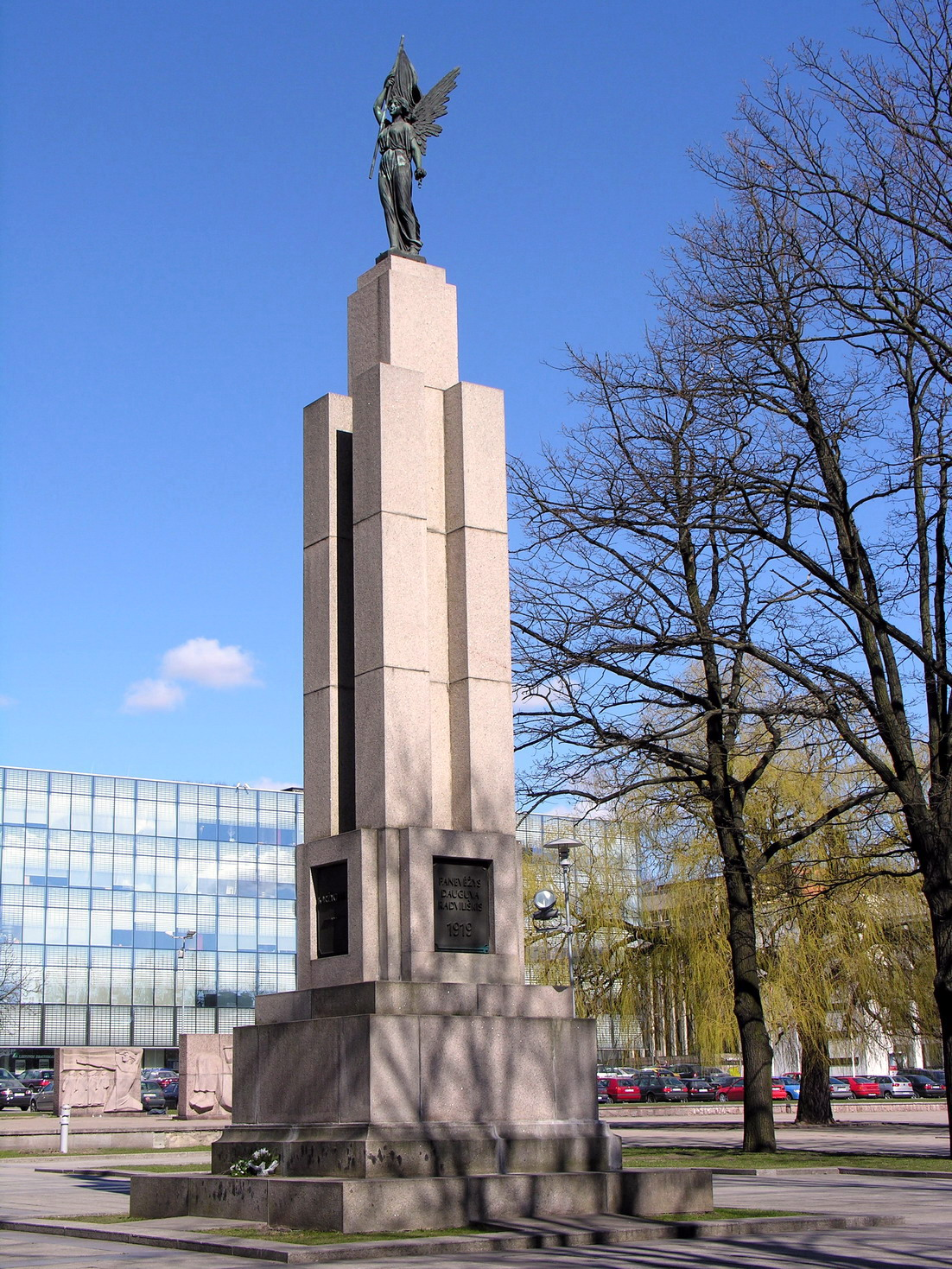
Statue of Liberty, Kaunas

Arguably his best-known work is the Statue of Liberty in Kaunas erected in 1922. It was the most important symbol of freedom in interwar Lithuania and is featured on modern 20 litas banknotes. Another major work is the designs for all litas coins in the interwar period and the Independence Medal. It is not widely known, but Zikaras' version of the coat of arms of Lithuania used on his coins was adopted after Lithuania declared re-independence in 1990, and used until 1991.

Also, in 1928 Zikaras created a sculpture for knygnešys that now stands in Kaunas. The sculpture depicts a peasant with a sack full of smuggled books on his back carefully monitoring if there are any border guards to stop him. Zikaras also created a great number of bas-reliefs and busts depicting various famous Lithuanians. Although Zikaras together with Petras Rimša are known as the first professional sculptors, Zikaras also left a number of paintings, illustrations, graphics. Most of his works are highly patriotic. He was buried in Petrašiūnai Cemetery.
