= Church of the Assumption of the Blessed Virgin Mary, Vilnius =

Church building in Vilnius, Lithuania

Church of the Assumption of the Blessed Virgin Mary Vilniaus Švč. Mergelės Marijos Ėmimo į dangų bažnyčia
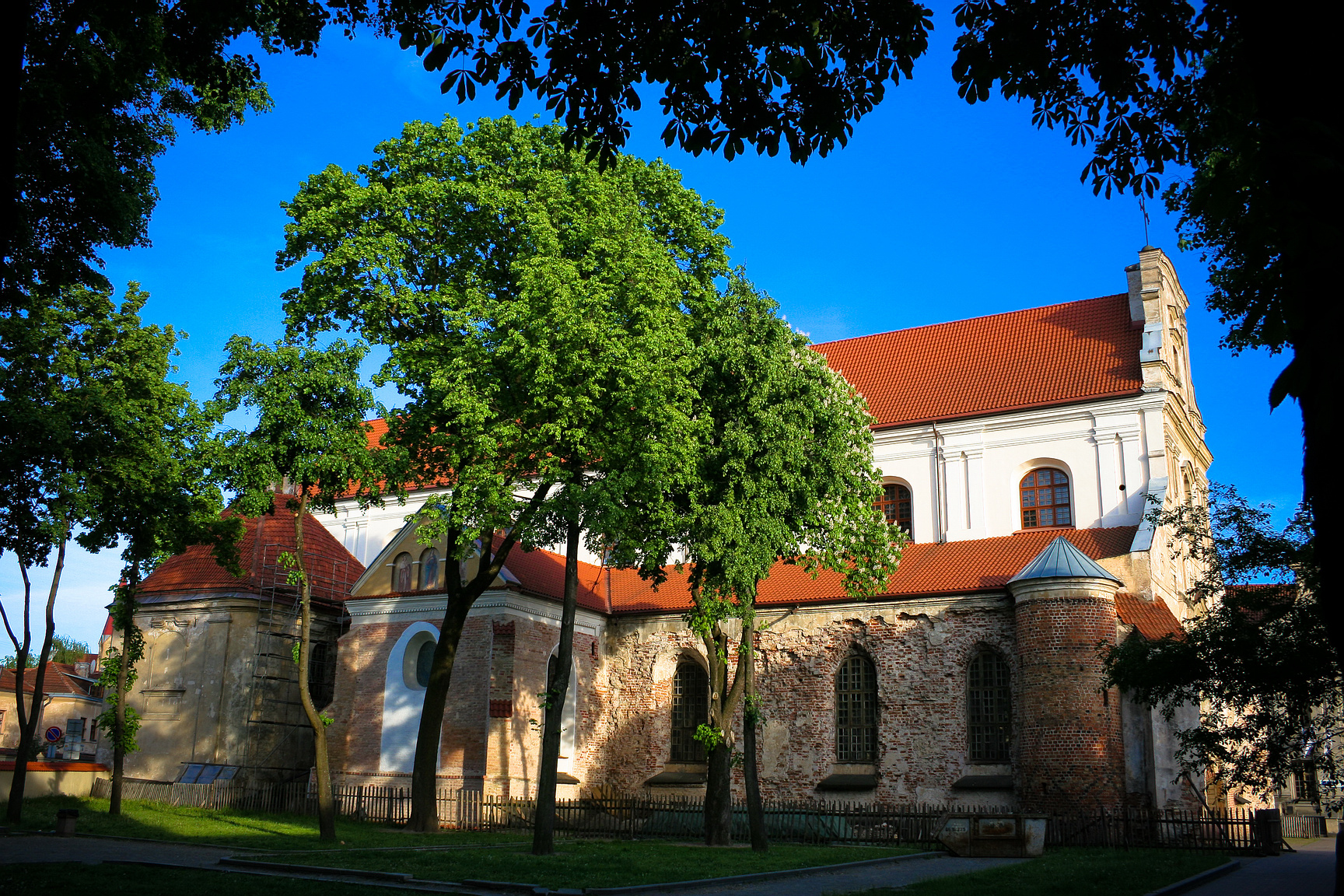

Religion
- Affiliation: Roman Catholic
- Diocese: Old Town

Location
- Location: Vilnius, Lithuania
- Interactive map of Church of the Assumption of the Blessed Virgin Mary; Vilniaus Švč. Mergelės Marijos Ėmimo į dangų bažnyčia
- Coordinates: 54.6795°N 25.2808°E

Architecture
- Type: Church
- Style: Gothic, Baroque
- Completed: 1421
- Materials: Brickwork

Website
- CityofMercy.lt

The Church of the Assumption of the Blessed Virgin Mary (Lithuanian: Vilniaus Švč. Mergelės Marijos Ėmimo į dangų bažnyčia) is a Roman Catholic church in the Trakų Street, Vilnius' Old Town, which was established by Franciscans.

The first Franciscan church was built at the end of the 13th century in this site, however it was rebuilt in 1421 because the initial church was burned down during an attack by the Crusaders in 1390.

== Gallery ==
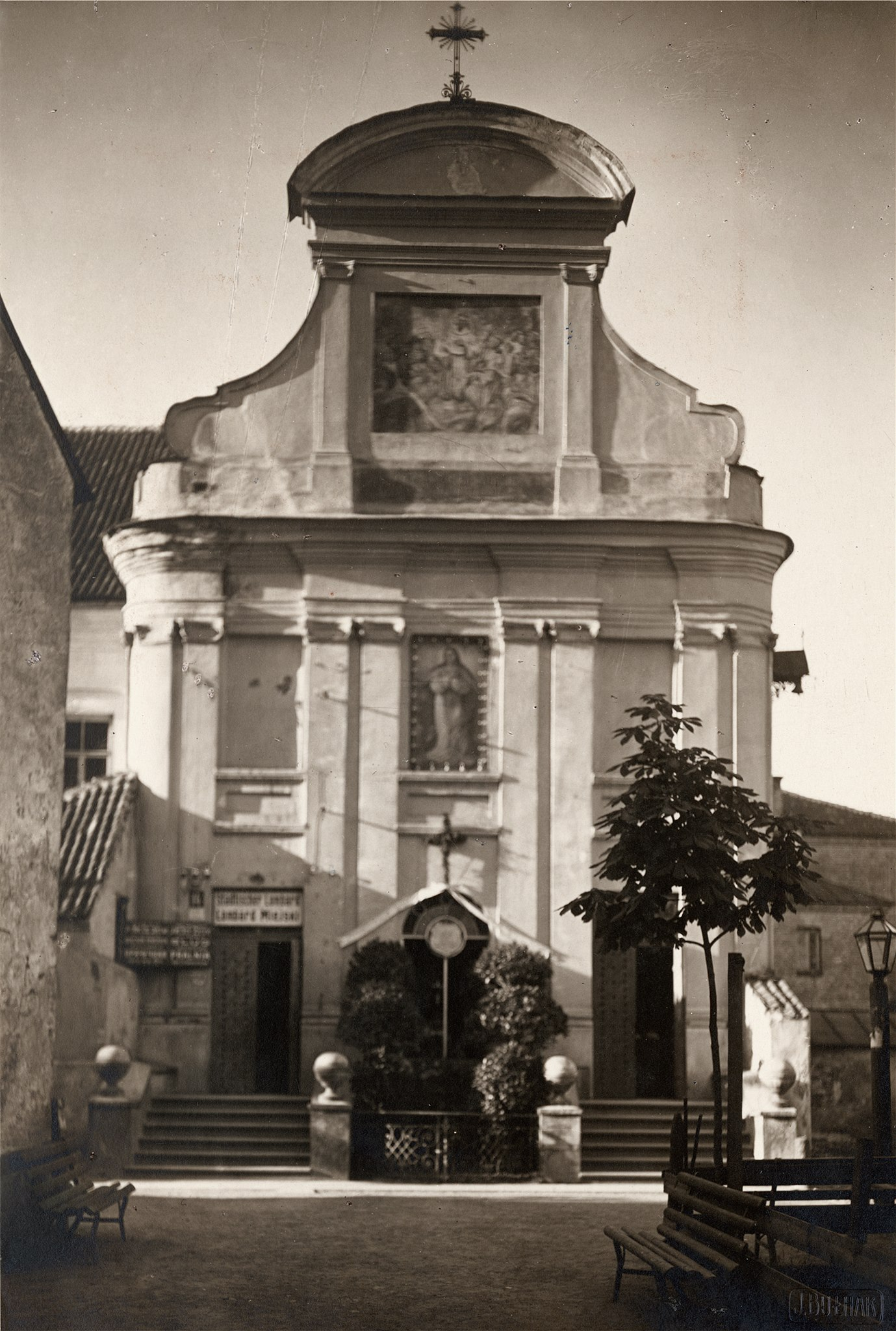
Church in 1917

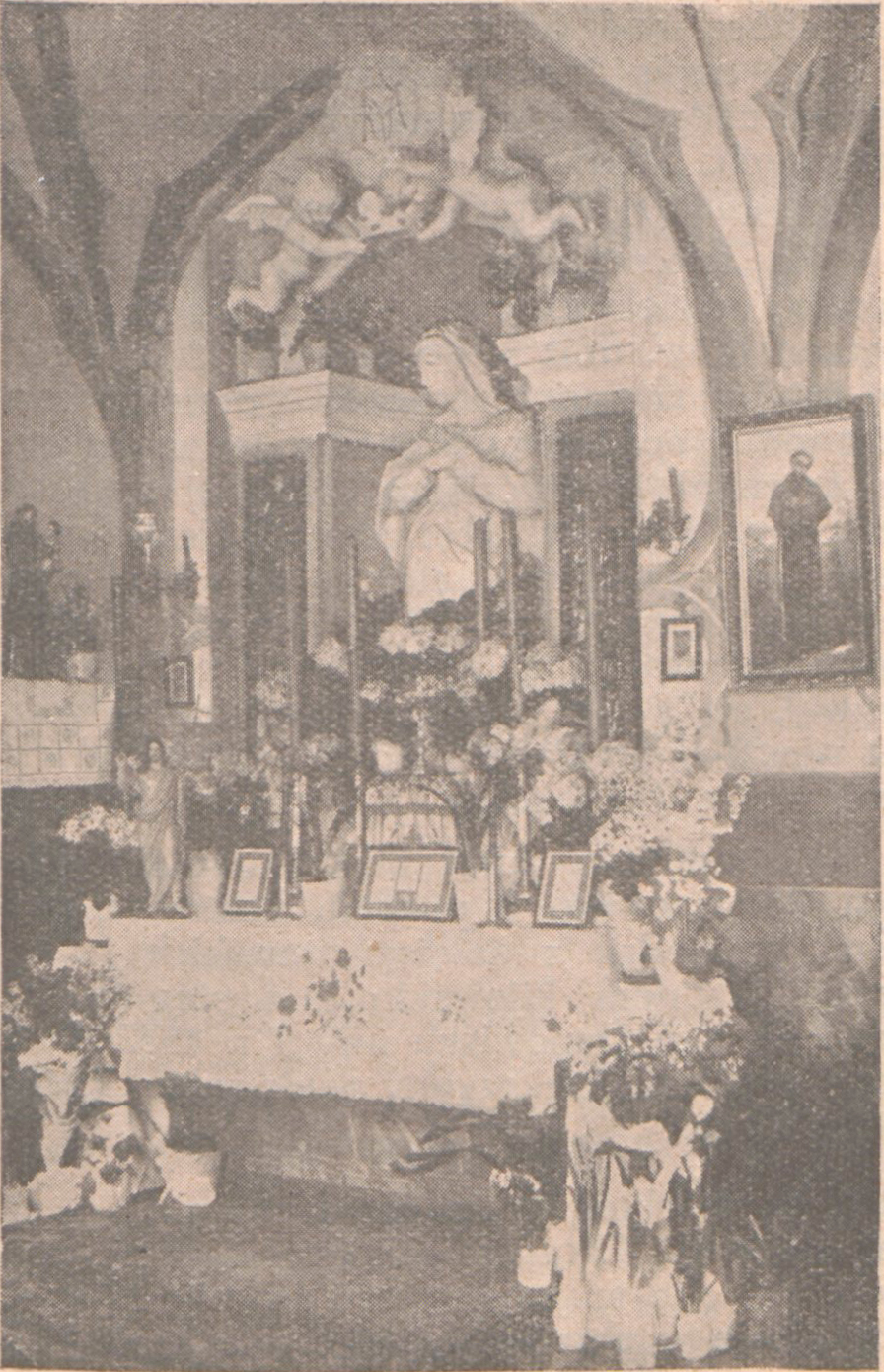
Interior of the church in 1935

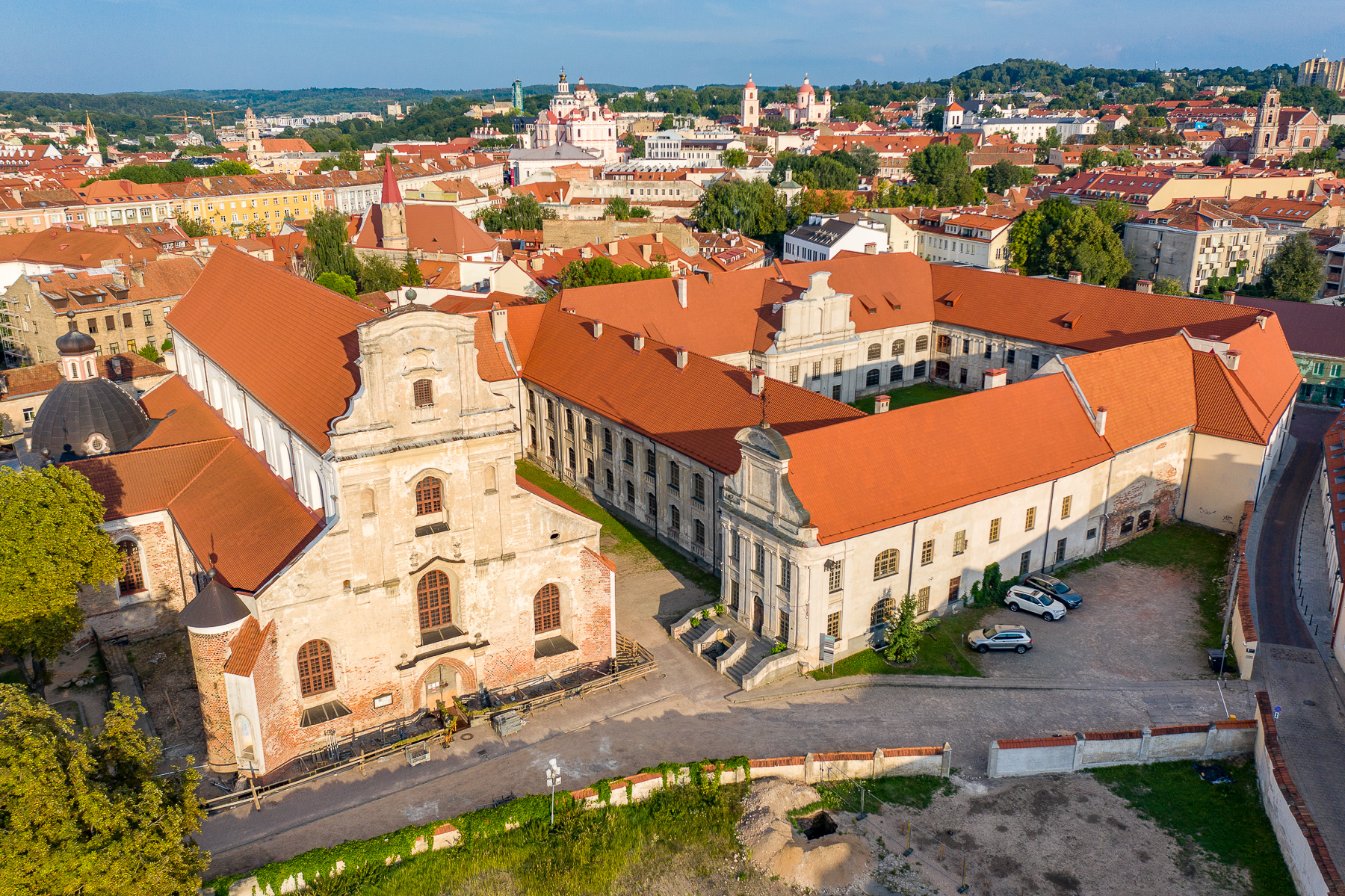
Aerial view in 2023

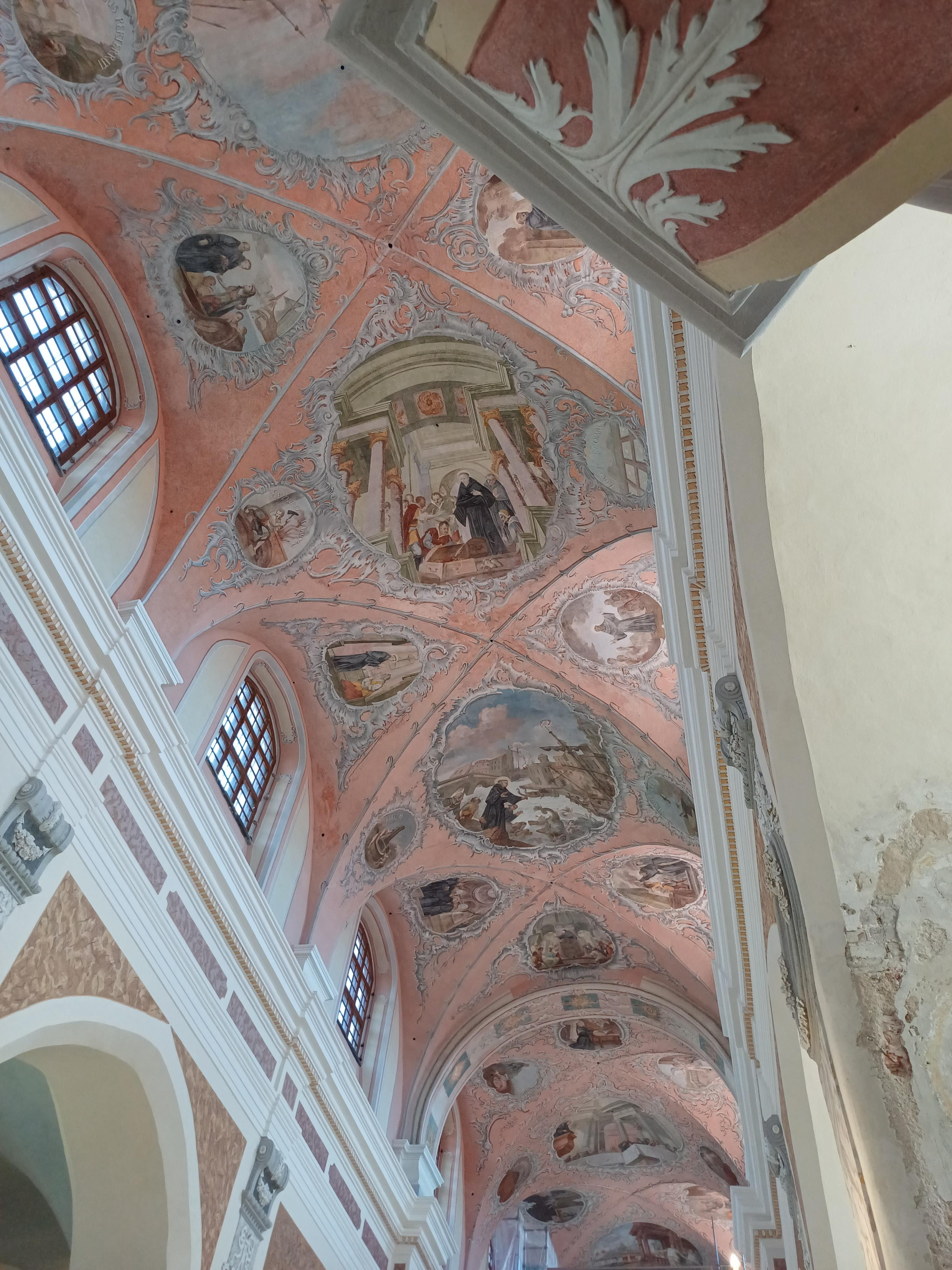
Ceiling frescoes, depicting the life of Anthony of Padua, in 2024

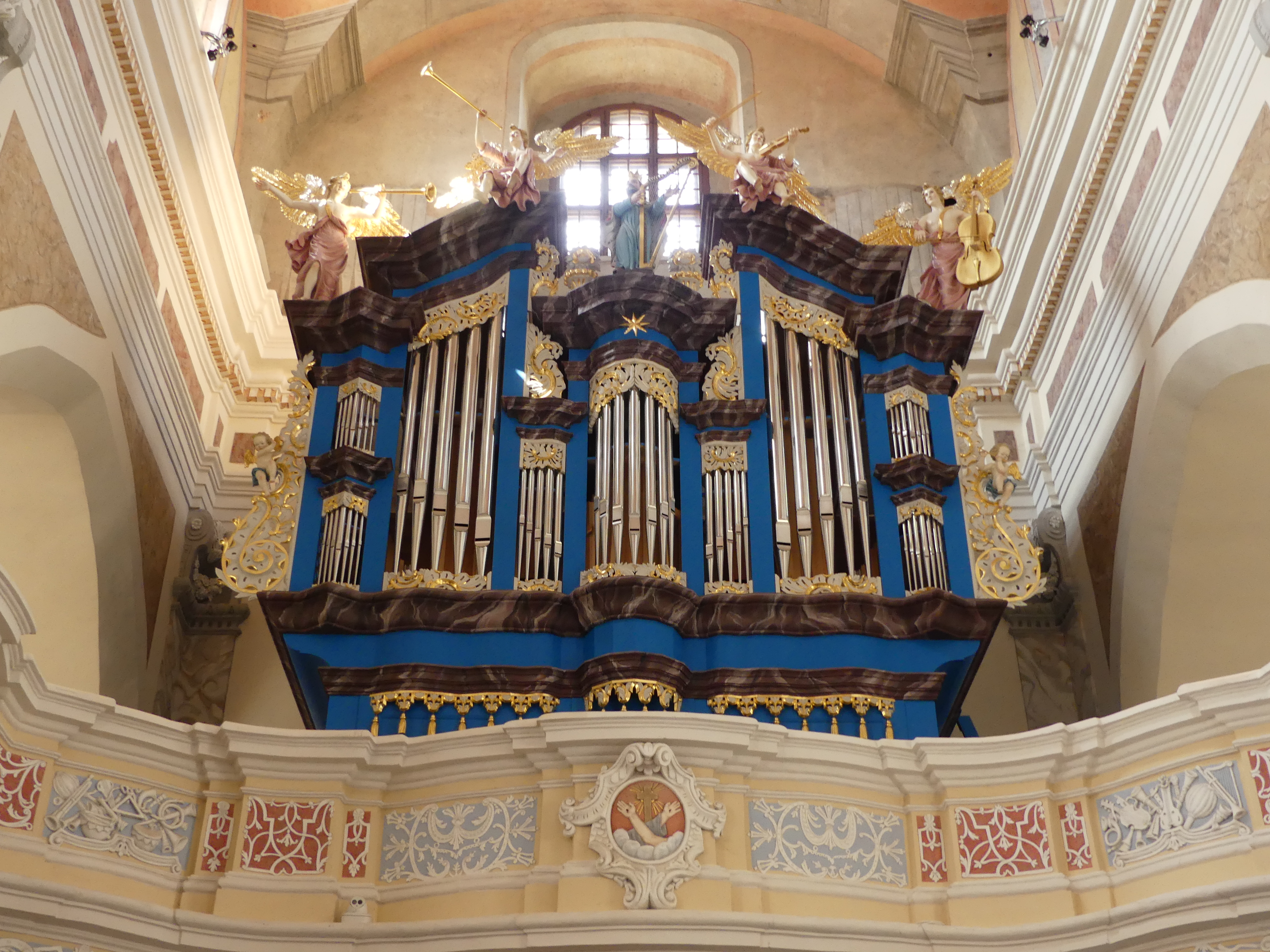
Pipe organ and below it is the Ornament of the Franciscans
