= Petras Rimša =

Lithuanian sculptor and medalist

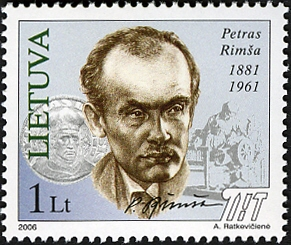
Stamp of Lithuania, 2006

Petras Rimša (Note: also known as Polish: Piotr Rymsza) (3 November 1881 in Naudžiai, Vilkaviškis district – 2 October 1961 in Kaunas) was one of the first professional Lithuanian sculptors and medalists.

== Biography ==
Rimša was born to a family of farmers in Suvalkija, which was then part of Congress Poland within Russian Empire. He was educated privately in Warsaw under Pius Weloński (1900–1903), at the École nationale supérieure des Beaux-Arts in Paris under Antonin Mercié (1903–1904), and Cracow Academy of Fine Arts under Konstanty Laszczka (1904–1905). However, he never graduated and never received any degrees. After return to Lithuania in 1905, he immersed in various Lithuanian cultural activities. Rimša was involved in founding of the Lithuanian Art Society and organizing the first national art exhibition in 1907. He exhibited his first realistic and patriotic works, which gained him recognition in Lithuania. He returned to education, studying at the Drawing School of the Imperial Society for the Encouragement of the Arts in Saint Petersburg from 1909 to 1911. After the studies he remained in Russia, participating in Lithuanian activities and exhibitions of Russian impressionists. He experimented with metal inlays and graphic works, which were influenced by Japonism and Art Nouveau. In 1919, he returned to Vilnius, Lithuania. However, after the Polish takeover of the Vilnius Region, he moved to Kaunas. This experience left Rimša with strong anti-Polish feelings, which were often reflected in his medals. He lived in Berlin in 1920–1924, visiting Italy, Great Britain, France, and toured United States in 1935–1938. After World War II, Lithuania was turned into the Lithuanian SSR, one of the republics of the Soviet Union. Rimša was acceptable to Soviet authorities and he continued to create, though his works often had to reflect Soviet symbolism and ideology. In 1954, he was awarded the title of People's Artist. He died in 1961 and was buried in Petrašiūnai Cemetery.

== Works ==
=== Sculpture ===
Rimša's early works are highly patriotic and realistic. His early work The Lithuanian School (Lietuvos mokykla also Vargo mokykla ("School of Hardship")) depicts a mother teaching her child to read in their native Lithuanian language in between her yarn spinning. This has become a symbol of the Lithuanian resistance to the Lithuanian press ban (1864–1904) and was featured on the 5 litas banknote. A large bronze copy was made in 1957 and was installed near the Vytautas the Great War Museum. It was inspired by his personal childhood education and experiences of his book smuggler brother. The Ploughman (Artojas) showcases misery and oppression of the Lithuanian farmers during the times of the Russian Empire. It depicts a farmer with a starved horse, which uses its last strength to pull the plough. Several copies exist; one of them is held by the Museum of Fine Arts, Boston. The sculpture received Pavel Stroganov Prize in 1910. It was later expanded into a sculptural trilogy with Enough of That Yoke (Gana to jungo, 1909), which showed rearing horse in an act of resistance, and Final (Finalas, 1910), which depicted a fallen horse. The two works were not well received and it seems that Rimša himself was not satisfied with them.

While in Smolensk, Rimša created In Torment (Skausmas) in 1916. This work, inspired by the hardships of World War I, depicts a suffering woman dressed in complex ornamented clothes. It is a stark departure from his earlier realistic works as it is symbolic, stylized, and heavily decorated with fine detail. It exhibits features of decorative design borrowed from graphic arts and ornamentation from traditional Lithuanian art. The overly complex and decorated style distracts the viewer from the intended message of pain and grief. This new style was later used for The Thinker (Satyras or Mąstytojas, 1921), Night and Day (Diena ir naktis, 1922), Tale of Spring and Autumn (Pavasario ir rudens pasaka, 1922), The Knight (Riteris or Karžygys, 1931). These works departed from strictly patriotic themes and became more Romantic.

=== Medals and other ===
From 1923, Rimša created various medals. Most of them are patriotic, created to mark anniversaries. At least five medals were minted in 1920s that supported Lithuania in its conflict with the Second Polish Republic over the Vilnius Region. A particularly grotesque medal Union Desired (Unijos nori) was struck in 1925. It depicted Poland as a deranged woman devouring Lithuanian children in front of the Vilnius Cathedral. Other medals commemorated Great Seimas of Vilnius of 1905, Klaipėda Revolt of 1923, establishment of the ecclesiastical province of Lithuania in 1926, 500th death anniversary of Grand Duke Vytautas in 1930. After World War II, Rimša created medals incorporating required attributes of Soviet propaganda. However, 1947 medal for Martynas Mažvydas and the first printed Lithuanian book display lyrics from the banned national anthem Tautiška giesmė. His last medal, created in 1959, was a self-portrait (obverse) with an exhibition of his works, including The Lithuanian School and The Ploughman (reverse). Rimša also created portraits (busts and reliefs) of Motiejus Valančius (1904), Jonas Basanavičius (1906), his mother (1910), diplomat Tomas Naruševičius (1924), Žemaitė (1926), and numerous others. He illustrated books by Vydūnas (1912–1913) and Pranas Mašiotas (1920 and 1922).
