= Trakų Street, Vilnius =

Street in Vlinius, Lithuania

Trakų Street
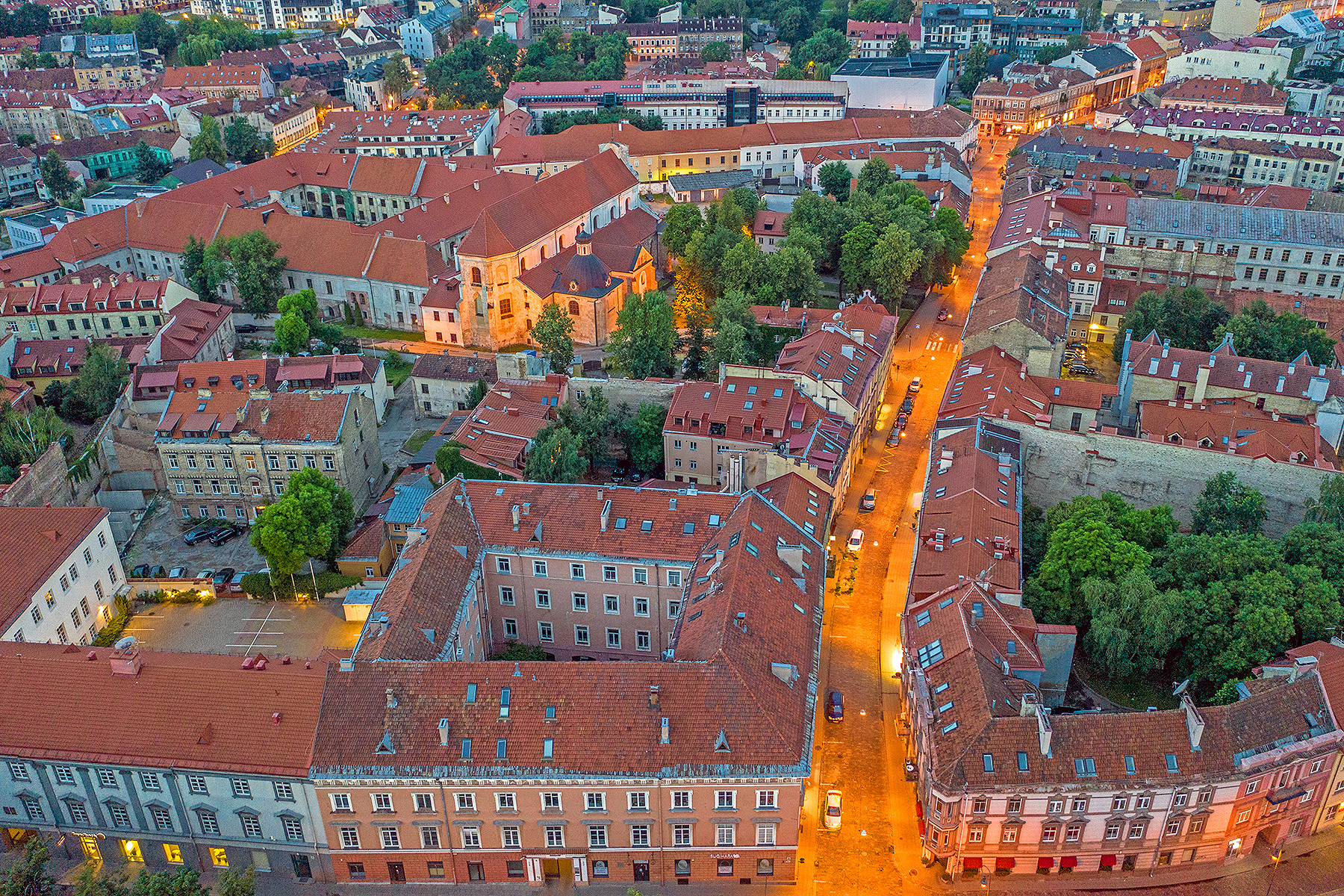
- Trakų Street in July 2020
- Native name: Trakų gatvė (Lithuanian)
- Former name(s): Trocka, Trocka droga, Trotsky (Russian: Троцкая)
- Length: 300 m (980 ft)
- Location: Vilnius, Lithuania
- Postal code: LT-01132

Trakų Street (literally, "Trakai Street"; Lithuanian: Trakų gatvė) is one of the oldest streets in the Vilnius Old Town.

== Gallery ==
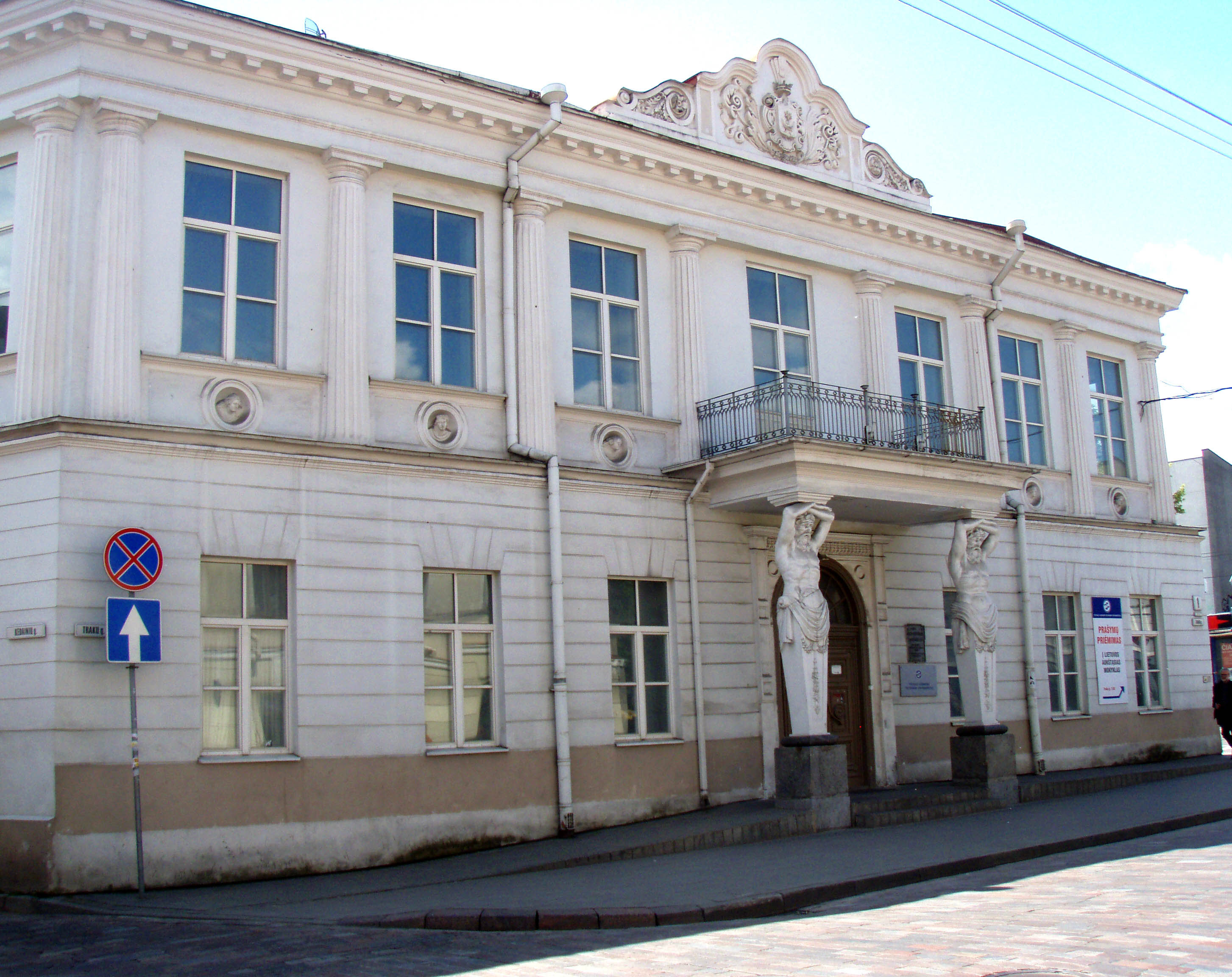
Vilnius Gediminas Technical University Faculty of Architecture

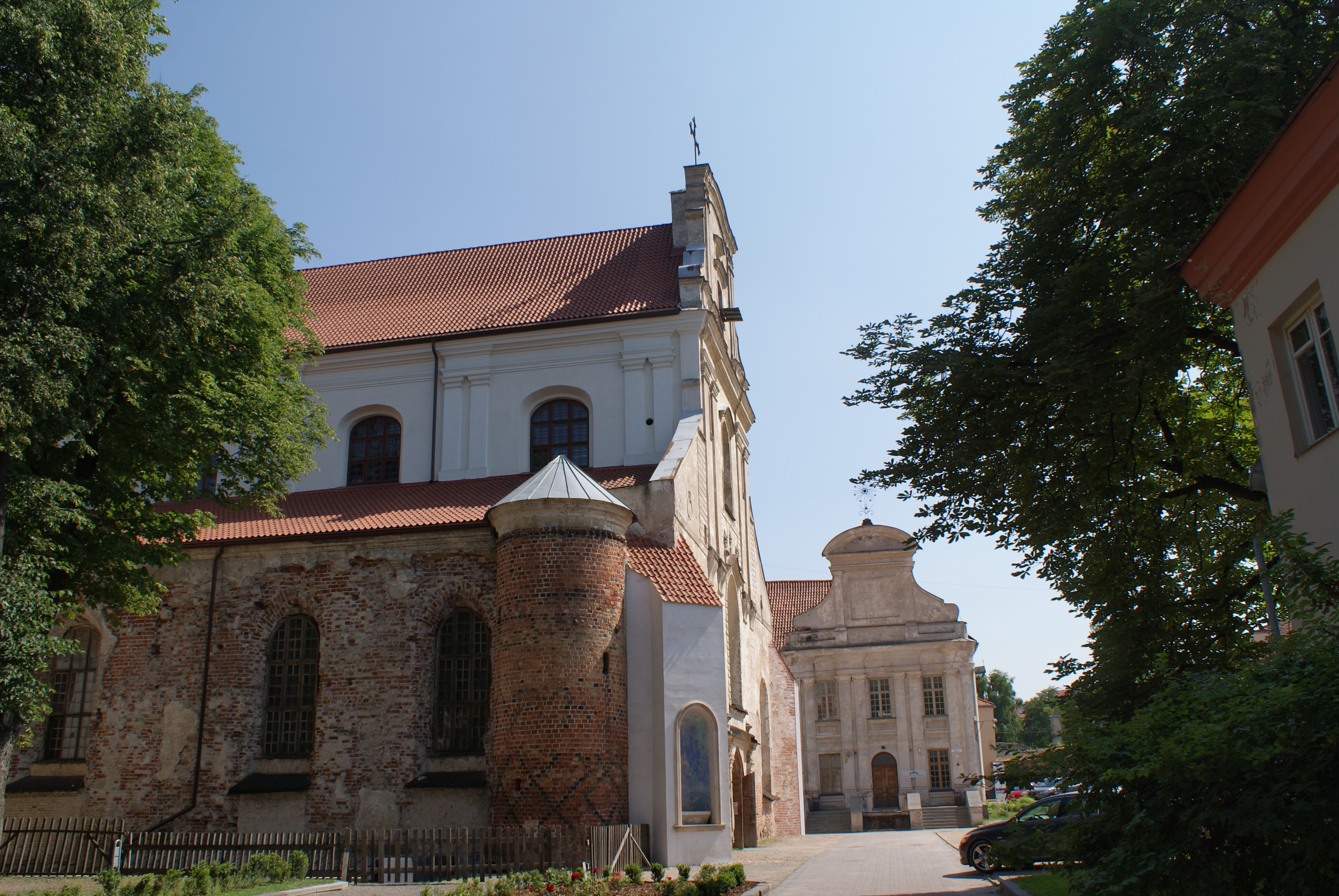
Church of the Assumption of the Blessed Virgin Mary

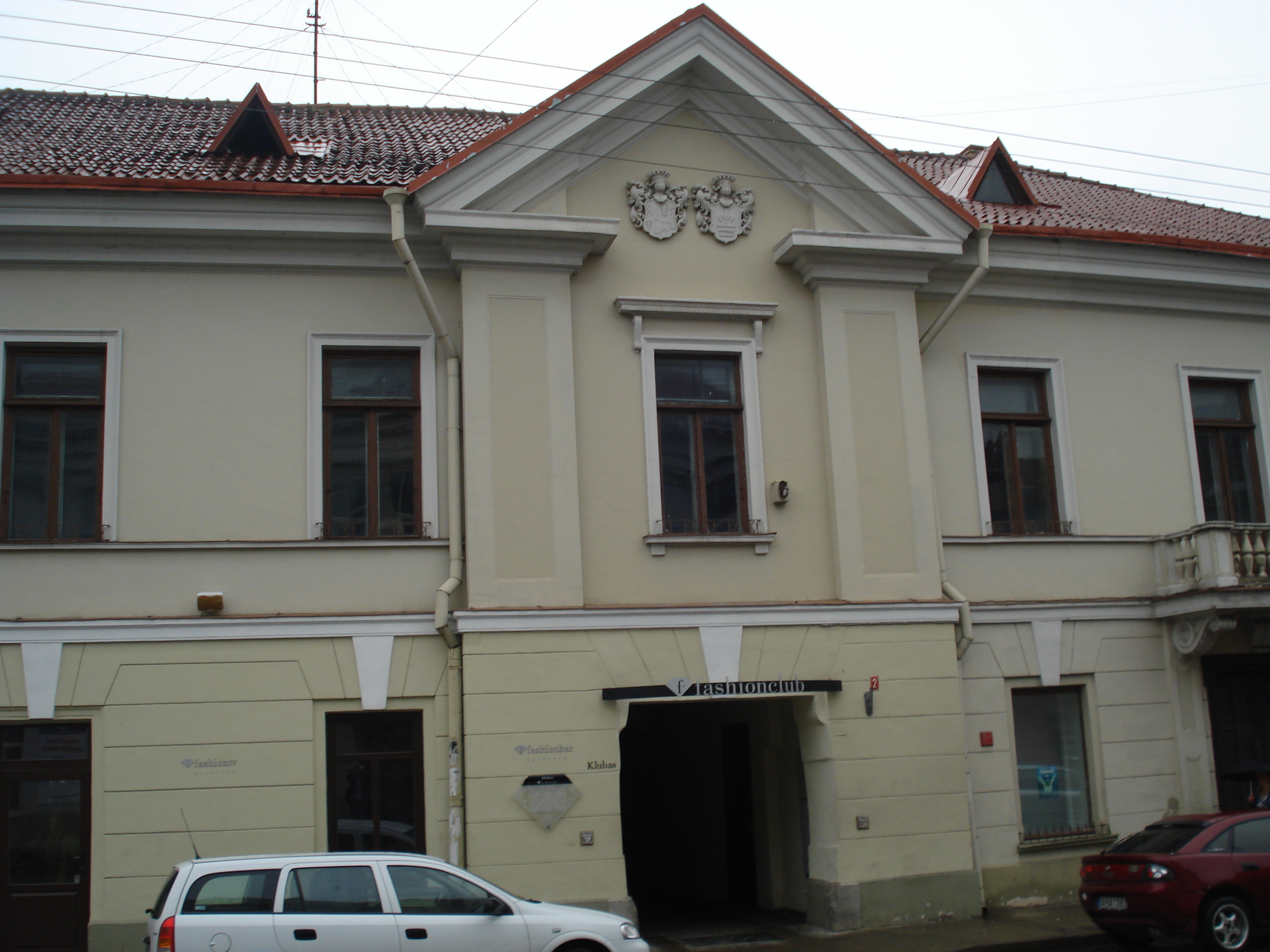
Umiastowski Palace
