= Cyprian Maculewicz =

19th-century architect active in Vilnius

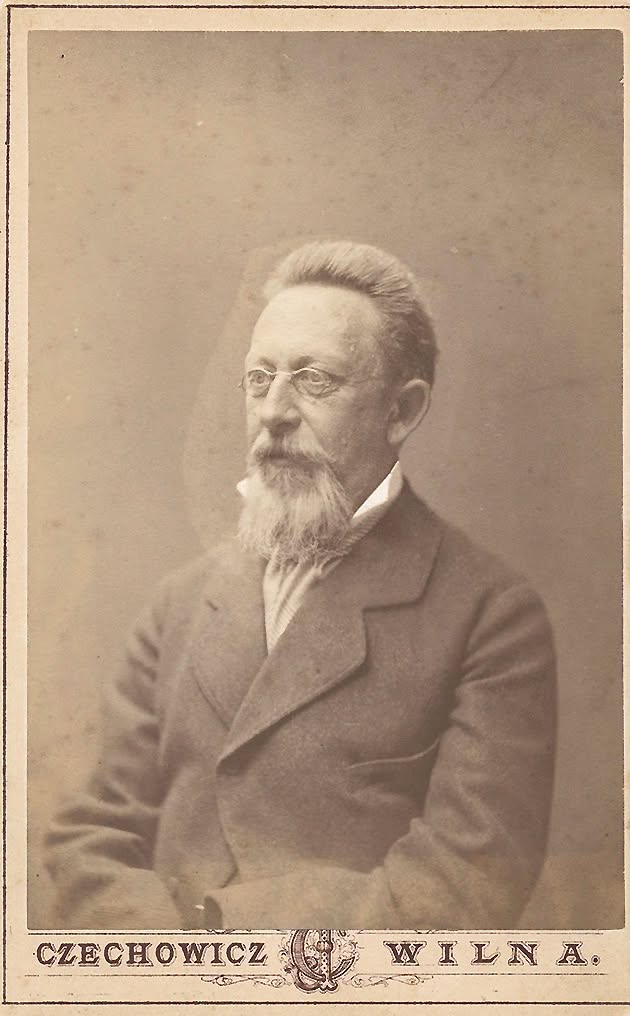
- Grave of Maculewicz in Rasos Cemetery
- Born: 10 July 1830
- Died: 15 March 1893; Vilnius, Vilna Governorate, Russian Empire
- Education: Imperial Academy of Arts
- Occupation: Architect
- Practice: City architect of Vilnius (1879–1893)
- Buildings: Palace of Klementyna Tyszkiewicz

Cyprian Maculewicz (Lithuanian: Kiprijonas Maculevičius; 10 July 1830 – 15 March 1893) was an architect active in Vilnius, then part of the Russian Empire. He served as the city architect of Vilnius from 1879 until 1893 and designed or reconstructed around fifty buildings in the city. His work was primarily Historicist and frequently employed forms derived from the Renaissance Revival, particularly the architecture of the Italian Renaissance.

His best-known works include the palace of Countess Klementyna Tyszkiewicz, now the seat of the Wroblewski Library of the Lithuanian Academy of Sciences, and the reconstruction of the neighbouring palace of Jan Tyszkiewicz.

== Biography ==
Little is known about Maculewicz's early life. He was born on 10 July 1830. He studied architecture at the Imperial Academy of Arts in Saint Petersburg, completing his studies there in 1854.

In December 1879 Maculewicz became the city architect of Vilnius, succeeding Aleksander Bykowski. He remained in the post until 1893. His tenure coincided with a period of substantial development outside the historic Old Town, when new residential and institutional buildings were being constructed along the expanding streets of the city.

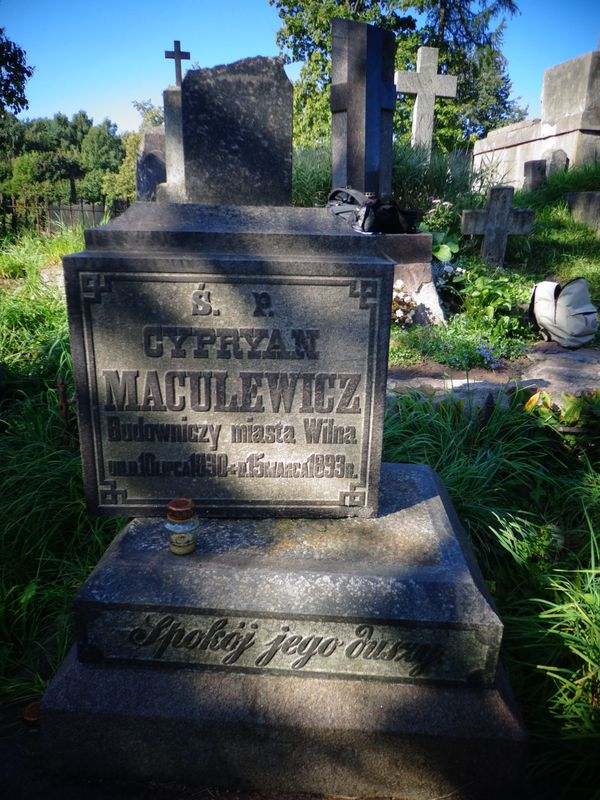
Cyprian Maculewicz's grave on Rasos Cemetery

Maculewicz died in Vilnius on 15 March 1893 and was buried in Rasos Cemetery. His grave survives in section 4 of the cemetery. Its Polish inscription describes him as Budowniczy miasta Wilna (transl. Builder of the city of Vilnius).

== Architecture ==
Maculewicz designed around fifty buildings in Vilnius, including urban residences, tenement houses, educational and charitable buildings. As city architect he was also involved in the reconstruction and repair of municipally owned buildings.

His best-known commission was the palace of Countess Klementyna Tyszkiewicz at present-day Žygimantų Street 1. The project was prepared in 1884, shortly after Tyszkiewicz had acquired the site. The residence was designed as a representative urban palace with Renaissance-inspired architectural forms. Maculewicz also prepared a reconstruction project for the neighbouring palace of Count Jan Tyszkiewicz in 1891. The project included an orangery and similarly drew on Italian Renaissance forms.

A substantial part of Maculewicz's output consisted of urban residential buildings. In 1890 Maculewicz designed buildings for the Jewish vocational school at present-day Islandijos Street 3. He is also credited with the design of a temporary wooden circus pavilion erected on Cathedral Square in 1880 for performances by the company of Italian circus entrepreneur Gaetano Ciniselli. It was one of the earliest purpose-built temporary circus structures in Vilnius.

As city architect, Maculewicz also supervised reconstruction and repair work on several municipal buildings, including Vilnius Town Hall, the municipal slaughterhouse and the former Dominican monastery.
