= Alfonsas Petrulis =

Lithuanian Roman Catholic priest and politician

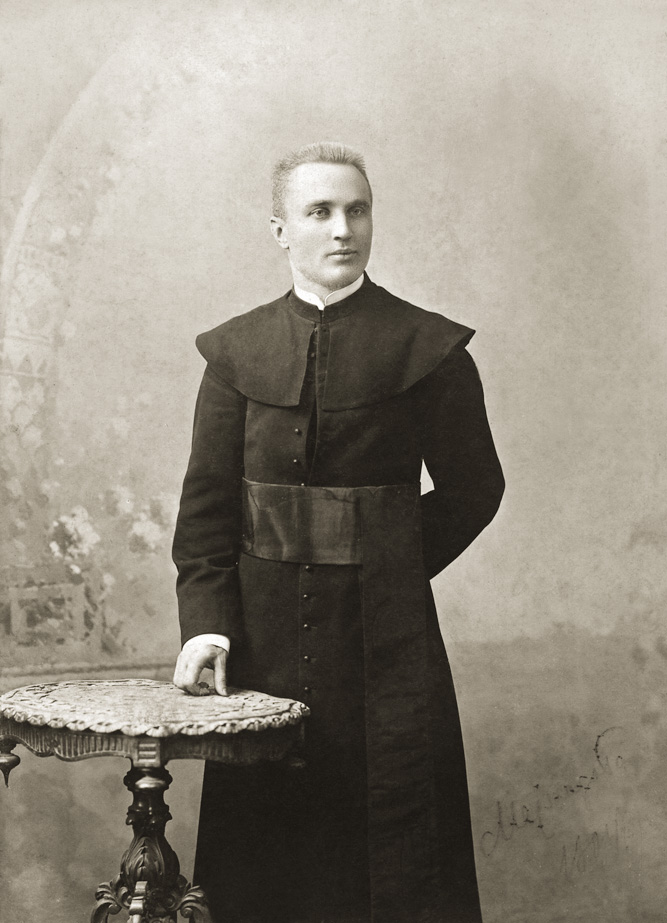
- Petrulis in 1904
- Born: 4 August 1873; Kateliškiai, Russian Empire
- Died: 28 June 1928 (aged 54); Musninkai, Lithuania
- Education: Kaunas Priest Seminary; Lviv Imperial Veterinary Institute; Vilnius Priest Seminary; Saint Petersburg Roman Catholic Theological Academy
- Occupations: Catholic priest, activist, politician
- Political party: Party of National Progress
- Movement: Lithuanian National Revival
- Board member of: Lithuanian Education Society Rytas
- Relatives: Vytautas Petrulis (brother)

Alfonsas Konstantinas Petrulis (4 August 1873 – 28 June 1928) was a Lithuanian Roman Catholic priest and one of the twenty signatories of the Act of Independence of Lithuania.

Petrulis attended priest seminaries in Kaunas and Vilnius. Due to poor health, he did not complete his studies at the Saint Petersburg Roman Catholic Theological Academy. He was ordained in 1899 and served as parish priest in nine different parishes of the Diocese of Vilnius and later the Diocese of Kaišiadorys. His longest tenure was 16 years spent in Pivašiūnai (1911–1927).

At the time, there were increasing tensions between Lithuanians and Poles and such frequent reassignments were likely caused by Petrulis pro-Lithuanian activities – he sought to deliver masses and sermons in Lithuanian, organize church choirs, established local chapters of Lithuanian societies, etc. This brought him into conflict with Polish activists. In 1909, Petrulis became a member of the five-member commission established by the diocese administrator Kazimierz Mikołaj Michalkiewicz to mediate local disputes between Lithuanians and Poles. In 1911, Petrulis became one of the co-founder of the biweekly Lithuanian newspaper Aušra which promoted the Lithuanian language, particularly in churches, among Lithuanians in Vilnius Region. Petrulis became one of the co-founders and board members of the Lithuanian Education Society Rytas in 1913.

In September 1917, he was elected by the Vilnius Conference to the 20-member Council of Lithuania which adopted the Act of Independence on 16 February 1918. He traveled twice to Switzerland to attend the Lithuanian conferences in Bern and Laussane. Petrulis became involved with the Party of National Progress and campaigned in the April 1920 election to the Constituent Assembly of Lithuania. However, the party won no seats and Petrulis retired from political life. He returned to pastoral duties until his death in 1928.

== Early life and education ==
Alfonsas Konstantinas Petrulis was born on 4 August 1873 in Kateliškiai near Vabalninkas which was then part of the Russian Empire. His parents were Lithuanian farmers who owned 27 hectares (67 acres) of land. Petrulis had four siblings – two sisters and two brothers. Alfonsas supported and financed education of his younger brother Vytautas Petrulis. Vytautas became the Minister of Finance (1922–1925) and Prime Minister of Lithuania (1925).

It appears the Petrulis did not attend a primary school and was educated at home. In August 1884, he enrolled directly at the eight-year Šiauliai Gymnasium. He was left the gymnasium after completing five classes in September 1889. He wanted to attend Kaunas Priest Seminary but was too young and had to wait until October 1891. One of his classmates was Kazimieras Steponas Šaulys, another signatory of the Act of Independence.

Petrulis studied at the seminary until 1895. On 20 December 1892, he received the four minor orders from bishop Mečislovas Leonardas Paliulionis but was not ordained priest. This is explained that he was either too young or still questioning his religious calling. In 1895, he enrolled at the Imperial Veterinary Institute in Lviv (then part of Austria-Hungary). During that time, he lived in Sokilnyky and assisted the local priests. In 1897, he dropped out from the veterinary institute and enrolled at Vilnius Priest Seminary for a year to finish his priest education.

Petrulis was then sent to study at the Saint Petersburg Roman Catholic Theological Academy. However, due to poor health, he returned to Vilnius in early 1899. After he recovered, he was ordained priest on 4 April 1899 by bishop Stefan Aleksander Zwierowicz. Three weeks later, Petrulis was appointed as vicar to the Church of St. Peter and St. Paul in Vilnius.

== Priesthood ==
Petrulis was moved to seven different parishes in ten years between 1899 and 1909. At the time, there were increasing tensions between Lithuanians and Poles in the Diocese of Vilnius and such frequent reassignments were likely caused by Petrulis pro-Lithuanian activities – he sought to deliver masses and sermons in Lithuanian, organize church choirs, established local chapters of Lithuanian societies, etc.

=== Bogdanova and Joniškis ===
On 7 December 1899, Petrulis was assigned to the filial church in Bogdanova in the parish of Halshany (present-day Belarus). On 27 January 1901, Petrulis was reassigned as parson to the parish in Joniškis. There, he resisted the pressure from a local noble to deliver sermons only in Polish. After Petrulis' departure, the noble organized a group of about ten farm workers which harassed Lithuanian speakers and interrupted Lithuanian masses. The conflict culminated in a trial of the noble and workers for disturbing public peace. Petrulis was one of 88 witnesses in the case. Eight people received prison sentences, but were pardoned on the occasion of the Romanov Tercentenary in 1913.

=== Maišiagala ===
On 12 August 1903, Petrulis was assigned to the parish in Maišiagala. He instituted weekly Catechism lessons and monthly sermons in Lithuanian. He also organized a Lithuanian primary school. Even such limited Lithuanian activities were attacked in the Polish press, including Goniec Wieczorny and Dziennik Wileński. Petrulis was accused of forcing locals to learn Lithuanian and using Lithuanian for various prayers. The accusations were debunked in Kurier Litewski.

In early 1906, Petrulis was questioned by the Tsarist police on suspicion that he agitated adherents of the Eastern Orthodox Church in Dūkštos to convert to Roman Catholicism. Petrulis explained that this was allowed under the Imperial decree On Strengthening the Principles of Religious Tolerance adopted in April 1905.

In March 1904, Petrulis started repairs of the church in Maišiagala – replace wood shakes roof with roof tiles over the church and sheet metal over the church tower, construct a small building in the churchyard to house church's implements and host wakes, and construct a clergy house. Petrulis agreed to finance the clergy house personally and that left him in debt. Eventually, Petrulis was able to repay the full debt of 1,050 rubles in 1912.

=== Nalibaki and Marcinkonys ===
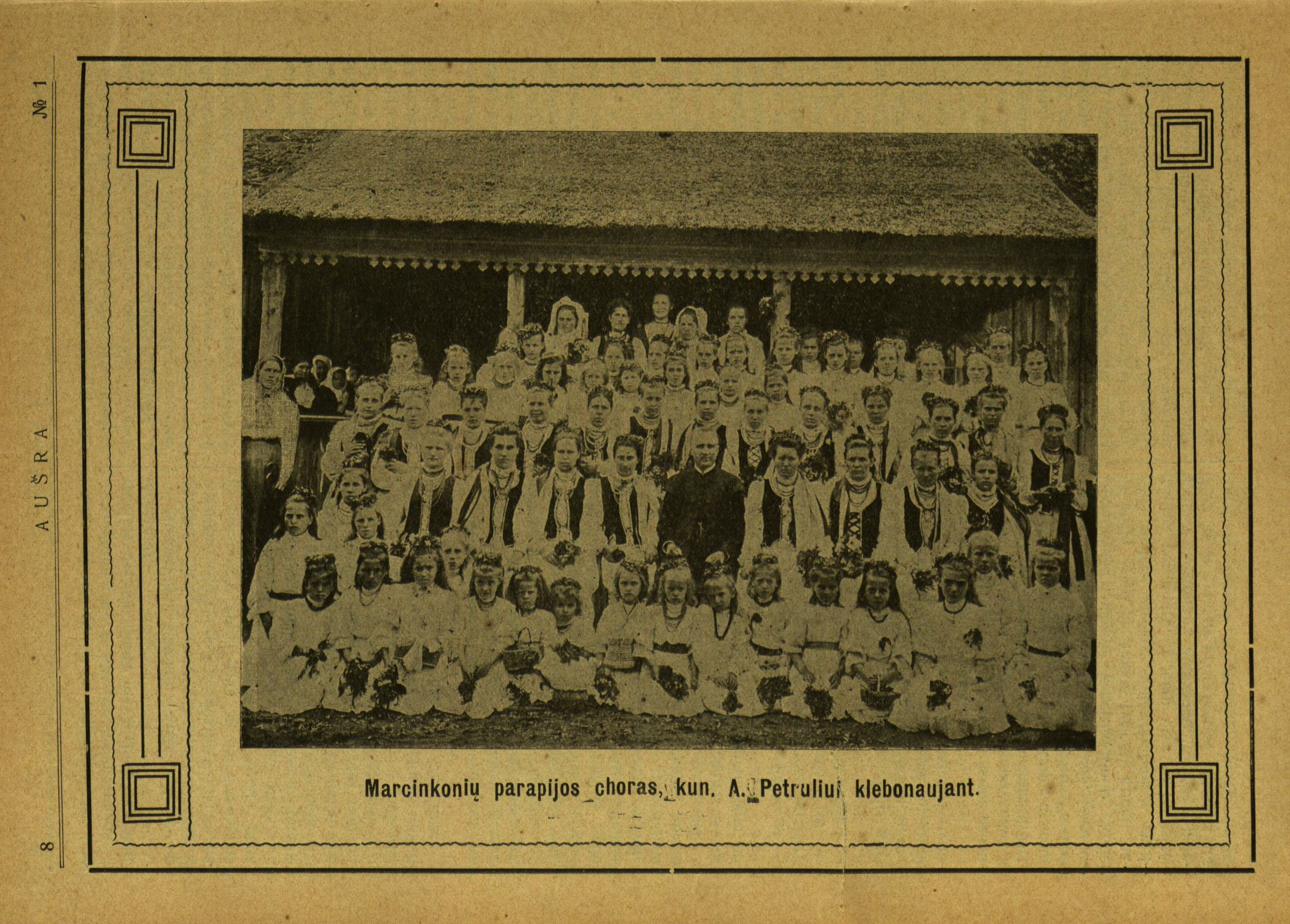
Photo of the church choir in Marcinkonys (Petrulis sits in the middle) published in Aušra

On 25 September 1907, Petrulis was assigned to the parish Nalibaki which had about 7,000 Catholics. The former pastor of Nalibaki instigated local residents to protest and complain about Petrulis demanding his return. Thus, they complained to the bishop at least three times and to the authorities of Vilna Governorate. His superiors investigated the complaints and found them untrue, but Petrulis was still reassigned to the smaller filial church in Marcinkonys on 31 October 1907.

Marcikonys were inhabited mainly by Lithuanians, thus Petrulis could work on Lithuanian causes without a conflict with the Poles. He completed church's repairs and purchased a new organ constructed by Jonas Garalevičius. He hired an experienced organist who organized a church choir. He also invited members of the Rūta Society to perform in Marcinkonys – they staged two Lithuanian plays and sung songs, including "Tautiška giesmė", on 16 July 1909. When he could not get the local Russian primary school to add lessons in Lithuanian, Petrulis established a secret Lithuanian school. Tsarist police discovered it and Petrulis was put on trial, but he was acquitted in November 1910. He purchased various Lithuanian periodicals and books, and encouraged villagers to read them.

In December 1909, Petrulis consecrated the new church in Dubičiai. In September 1920, Petrulis supported a local group of Lithuanian Riflemen in Pivašiūnai by supplying them with 10 rifles and 500 bullets.

=== Pivašiūnai ===
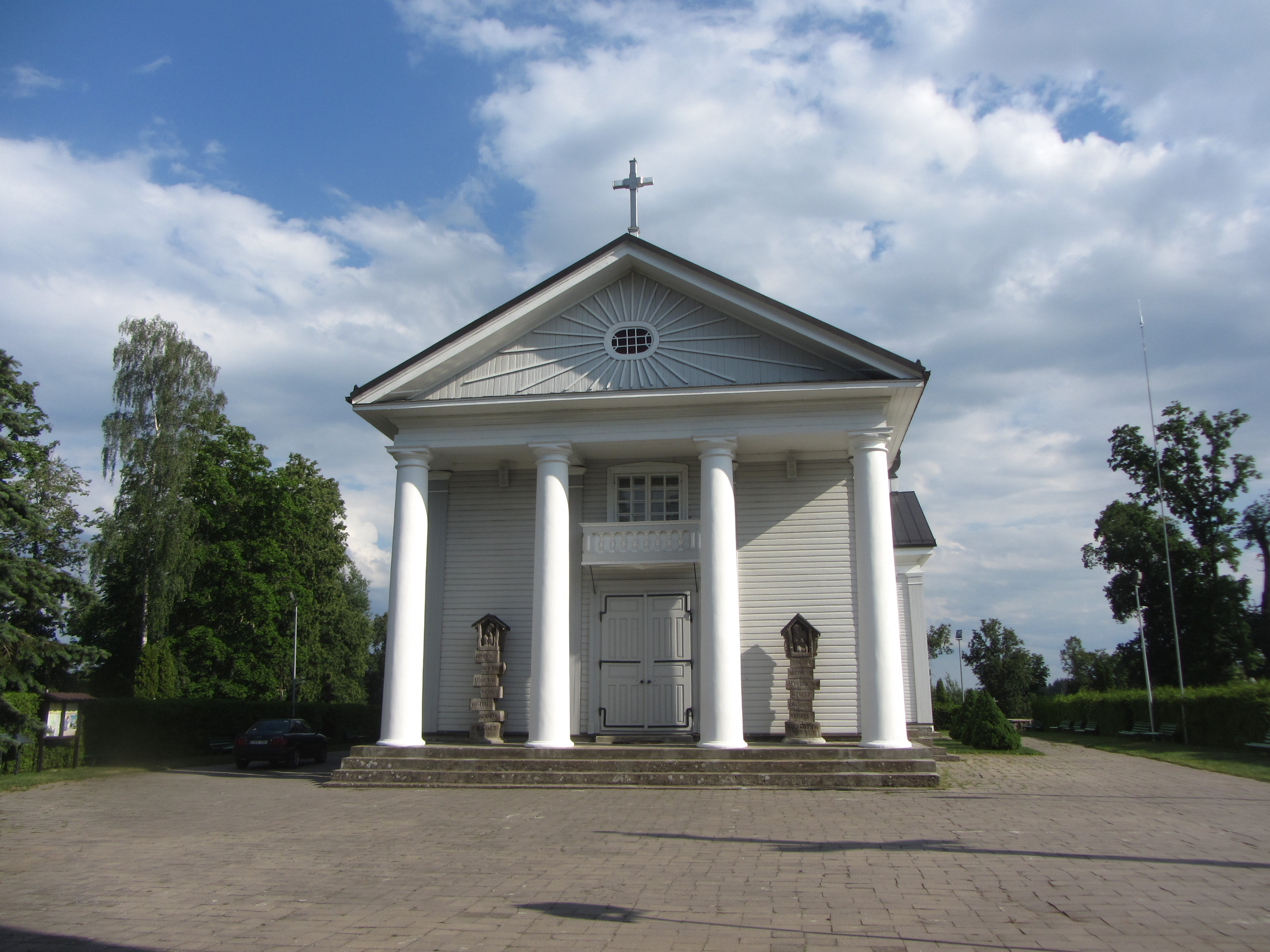
Catholic church in Pivašiūnai

On 22 April 1911, Petrulis was assigned to Pivašiūnai where he spent 16 years. The parish had about 5,000 Catholics of which about 3,000 were Lithuanians. Petrulis launched Lithuanian sermons, lessons in Catechism, organized a Lithuanian choir. This angered local Polish nobles who complained to his ecclesiastical superiors. Diocese administrator Kazimierz Mikołaj Michalkiewicz sent Vladas Mironas and Jonas Navickas to investigate the complaints, but they found them untrue. Accusations against Petrulis were published in Kurier Wileński claiming that he incited violence against Poles, pushed and hit a Polish nobleman who came to discuss an event, refused to hear confessions in Polish, etc. Petrulis sued the newspaper for defamation and was represented by attorney Petras Leonas. Petrulis won in district court, but lost on appeal. Further complaints were made to Tsarist authorities who searched the clergy house in early 1912 hoping to find evidence of an illegal school. Further complaints about Petrulis and his insistence on using the Lithuanian language were made in 1915 and 1918.

Petrulis organized and became chairman of the local chapters of the Lithuanian Education Society Rytas in August 1913 and the Lithuanian Catholic Temperance Society in November 1913. Petrulis also took over town's struggling consumer cooperative and improved its shop. During World War I, Petrulis organized a local society to provide aid to war refugees and organize primary schools. In 1917, nine parish's villages had Lithuanian schools and three villages had Polish schools. The church bells were taken by soldiers to Russia, but Petrulis was able to purchase a new organ and other church implements.

During the Polish–Lithuanian War, Petrulis was briefly arrested twice by the Polish troops in September 1919.

=== Last years ===
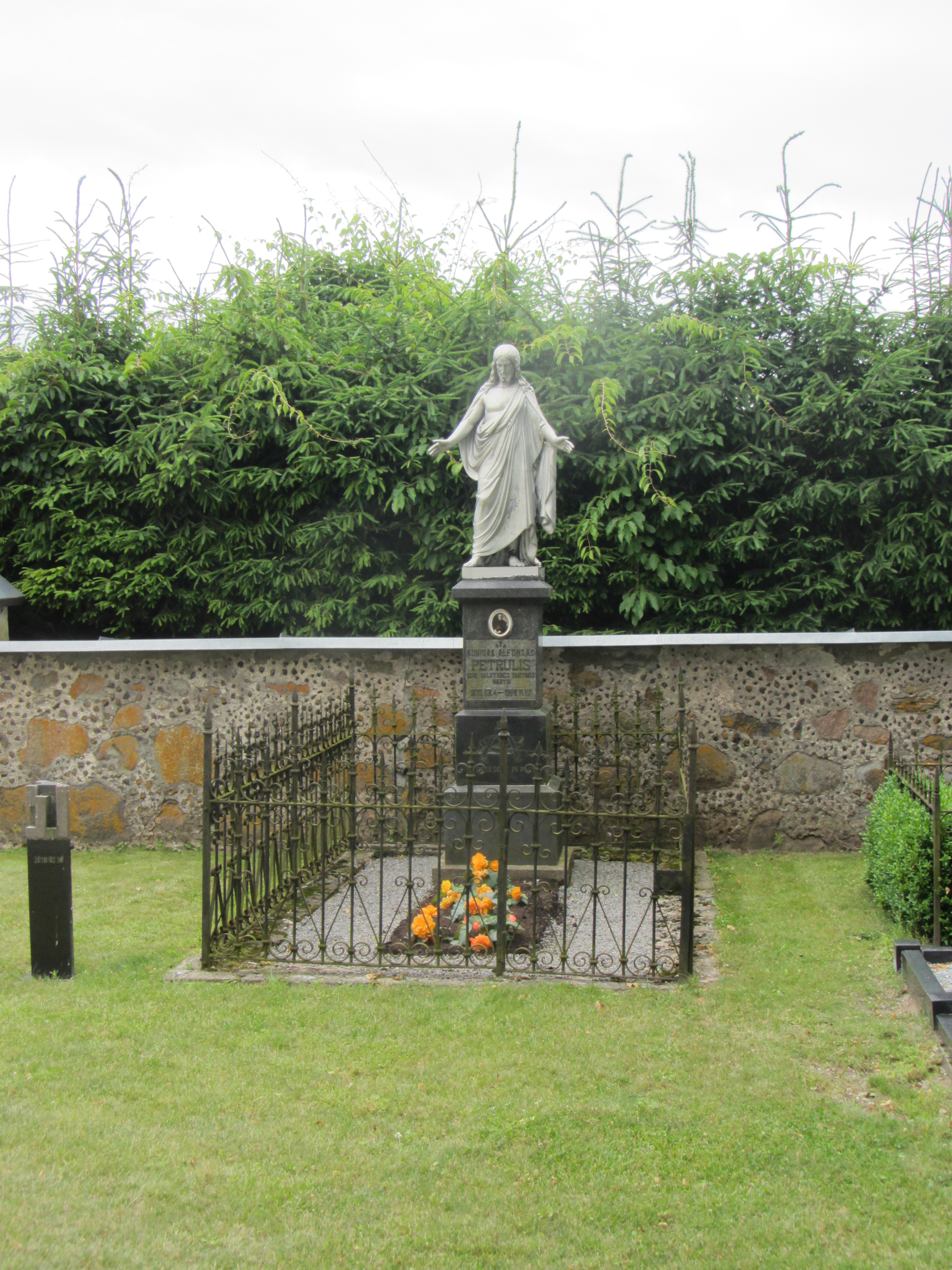
Grave of Petrulis in the churchyard of Musninkai

On 2 May 1924, Petrulis became dean of Stakliškės (he continued to be the parish priest in Pivašiūnai). When the Diocese of Kaišiadorys was formed in 1926, he became dean in Alytus. His health began to deteriorate. He spent about two months in early 1927 seeking treatments in Germany and France. Upon return, he was reassigned from Pivašiūnai to the parish of Paparčiai on 30 May 1927. In August 1927, in a letter to bishop Juozapas Kukta, Petrulis reported that he suffered from pleurisy and kidney ailments, was treated by doctor Vladas Kairiūkštis, and was cared for by his brother Vytautas Petrulis.

Petrulis was reassigned to the parish in Musninkai on 7 March 1928. He died there from a heart attack on 28 June 1928. He was buried in the churchyard two days later. Funeral speeches were given by his associate Vladas Mironas, brother Vytautas, and government representative Stasys Čiurlionis. His grave monument, which includes a copy of Christus by Bertel Thorvaldsen, was added to the Registry of Cultural Property in 1996.

== Activism ==
=== Language of prayers ===
Lithuanian prayers were full of loan words and barbarisms. Therefore, in 1909, priests Adomas Jakštas, Juozas Laukaitis, and Petrulis formed a committee to review and revise the Lord's Prayer and other Christian prayers. Petrulis was not an expert in this field and mainly deferred to the other two members. The priests were assisted by linguists, but in a few instances they did not dare change the almost 400-year tradition and fully implement linguists' suggestions. However, they much improved the language and the revised prayers were officially adopted at the end of World War I.

In April 1909, Petrulis attended a meeting organized by the Archdiocese of Warsaw to review and revise Catholic rites that were used in the diocese since 1634. However, in private correspondence, Petrulis considered the meeting a waste of time.

=== Polish–Lithuanian relations ===
In June 1906, Petrulis published an article in Vilniaus žinios arguing that Lithuanians needed to petition the Holy See directly so it could be informed about the ongoing Polonization and discrimination against the Lithuanians in Catholic churches. In late 1907, Jonas Basanavičius organized such delegation and invited Petrulis. However, Petrulis complained of financial difficulties and inability to leave the parish for a prolonged period of time. Additionally, the Diocese of Vilnius forbade its priests from traveling to Rome. Therefore, the plans fell through.

In 1908, diocese administrator Kazimierz Mikołaj Michalkiewicz was criticized in the Russian press for his in ability to deal with the conflicts between Polish and Lithuanian activists in various parishes and specifically in the area of Trakai. This attracted attention from Alexey Kharuzin, director of the Department of Spiritual Affairs of Foreign Faiths under the Ministry of Internal Affairs. In November 1908, Michalkiewicz appointed a five-member commission to investigate the situation in Trakai. The commission included Petrulis and was chaired by Antanas Smetona. Further, in February 1909, Michalkiewicz organized a gathering of Polish and Lithuanian priests to discuss the conflicts. The gathering in principle agreed that mixed parishes should be served by bilingual priests and that sermons should also be delivered in both languages. The gathering established a permanent five-member commission to mediate the local disputes. It included two Lithuanians (Petrulis and Juozapas Kukta), two Poles (Józef Songin and Stanisław Jasieński), and chairman Jan Kurczewski who was a Pole.

In summer 1918, Petrulis and Juozas Purickis traveled to Marijampolė to visit Jurgis Matulaitis-Matulevičius who was considered for the new bishop of Vilnius. In his diary, Matulaitis-Matulevičius wrote that they came to make sure he was sufficiently Lithuanian, while Purickis wrote in his memoirs that their goal was to convinced Matulaitis-Matulevičius to take on the bishop's role.

=== Publications ===
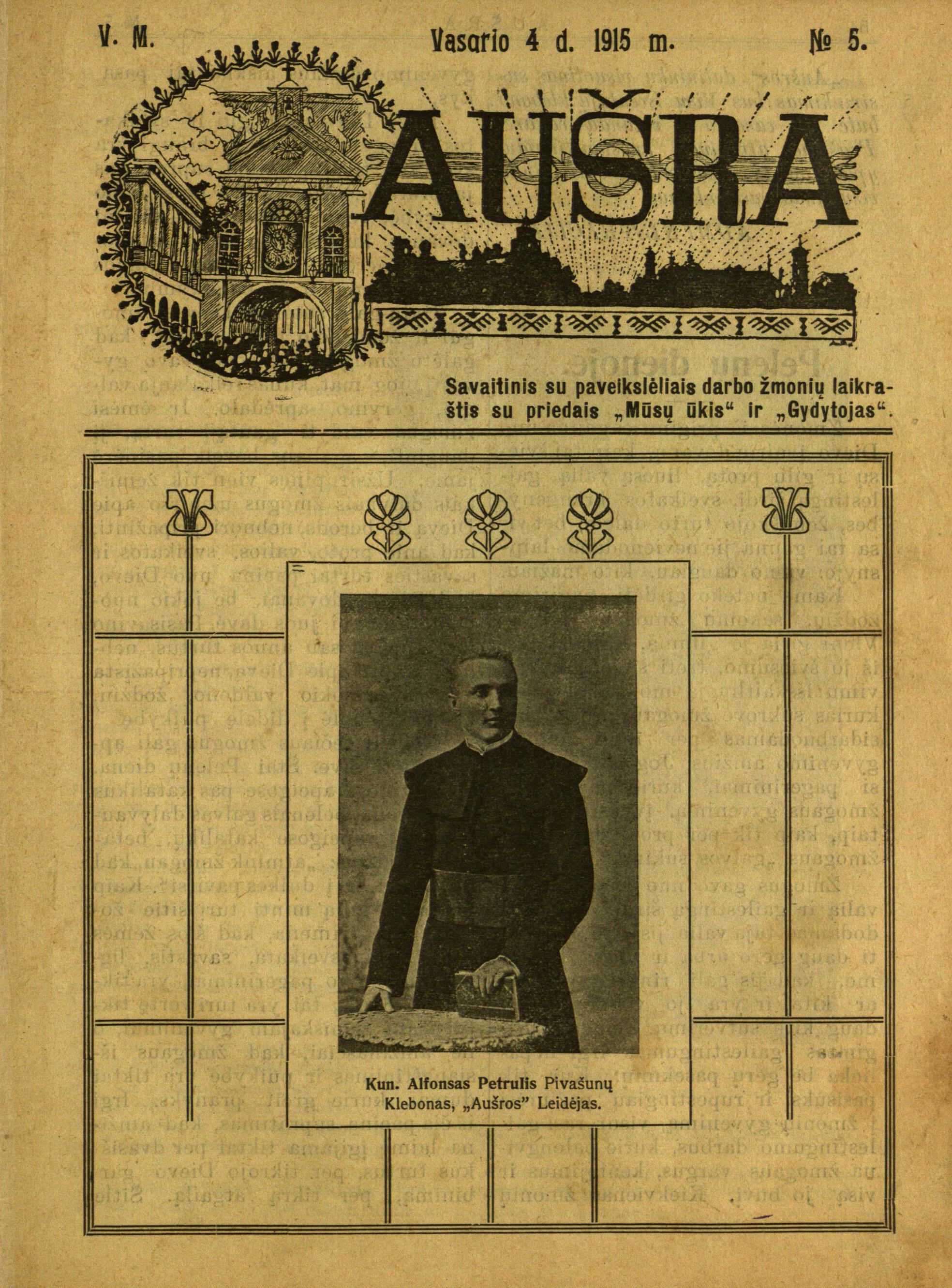
Petrulis on the cover of the 4 February 1915 issue of Aušra

Petrulis collaborated with the Lithuanian press and published articles in Vilniaus žinios, Viltis, Aušra, Šaltinis, Bažnytinė apžvalga, Spindulys, Tėvynės sargas, Lietuvos aidas, Ūkininkas, Tauta, Vilniaus garsas, Mūsų ūkis, Darbo balsas. Most of his articles were informational about his work or conditions in his parishes.

A 32-page Polish booklet Kim jesteś? Litwinem czy Polakiem? (Who Are You? A Lithuanian or a Pole?) was published in 1911; it was also published in Lithuanian. It is attributed to Petrulis, but the authorship is not certain. The booklet discussed the issues of the Polish-Lithuanian identity, status of the Lithuanian language, and languages used in church services using the question-and-answer format.

In spring 1911, Petrulis, Vladas Mironas, and Jonas Navickas established a company which began publishing the Lithuanian newspaper Aušra in October 1911. It was aimed at Lithuanians in Vilnius Region with the goal to promote the Lithuanian language, particularly in churches. The newspaper was published every two weeks and was edited by Petras Kraujalis. Petrulis contributed about twenty articles to Aušra, but it is difficult to determine the exact number as many articles were signed by various pen names. He published a series of ten educational articles discussing scientists and their inventions (Archimedes, Isaac Newton, Thomas Edison, etc.).

In December 1917, the Lithuanian Christian Democratic Party revived Tėvynės sargas. Its first issue listed Petrulis as one of the nine main contributors to the newspaper. He contributed a few articles, including a report from Vilnius Conference and a more theoretical exploration of the concept of a state.

Petrulis published a few articles in Tauta published by the Party of National Progress in 1919–1920. The main topic of these articles was the anti-Lithuanian policies of the Second Polish Republic in the contested Vilnius Region (see also: Polish–Lithuanian War).

=== Societies ===
In March 1907, Lithuanian activists established the educational Society Vilniaus Aušra (Dawn of Vilnius) with the goal of organizing Lithuanian primary schools in Vilna Governorate. Petrulis was elected as a candidate to its board. However, Tsarist authorities liquidated the society in December 1908. The idea of an educational society was once again raised by the intellectuals in a meeting of Aušra publishers in Vilnius in 1911. Petrulis became one of the co-founders of the Lithuanian Education Society Rytas and was elected to its board during its founding meeting on 31 January 1913. He was not reelected in 1915 as it was decided that board members should live in Vilnius. In 1918, Petrulis became the chairman of the local chapter of Rytas Society in Aukštadvaris and organized a progymnasium which opened in fall 1918.

Petrulis was a member of various other Lithuanian societies, including the Lithuanian Mutual Aid Society of Vilnius (since 1906), the Lithuanian Scientific Society (since 1908), Society of Saint Casimir which published Lithuanian books and periodicals, and Lithuanian Catholic Temperance Society. In October 1915, Petrulis became vice-chairman of the Trakai chapter of the Lithuanian Society for the Relief of War Sufferers.

== Politics ==
=== Early activities ===
During the Russian Revolution, he attended the Great Seimas of Vilnius in December 1905. In October 1905, he organized a meeting of Lithuanian priests from the Diocese of Vilnius. However, out of about 150 priests, only 18 attended.

In May 1917, 44 Polish activists signed a memorandum to Theobald von Bethmann Hollweg, the Chancellor of the German Empire, claiming that areas around Vilnius were Polish and should be incorporated into Poland with the preservation of autonomy for other nationalities. Lithuanian activists organized a response and 19 men, including Petrulis, signed a protest memorandum arguing for an independent Lithuania.

=== Vilnius Conference ===
As German military advances stalled in 1917, German leadership rethought their strategy for occupied Lithuania. The policy of open annexation was replaced by a more subtle strategy of creating a network of formally independent states under German influence (the so-called Mitteleuropa). To that end, Germans asked Lithuanians to establish an advisory council (Vertrauensrat). Lithuanians started organizing Vilnius Conference which would elect such council, which became known as the Council of Lithuania. In August 1917, a committee organizing the conference drafted a list of candidates to the Council of Lithuania; the 24 proposed candidates included Petrulis.

Vilnius Conference was held in September 1917. Petrulis received 136 votes for and 67 votes against and, as the 17th-ranked candidate, was elected to the 20-member Council of Lithuania. At the time, Petrulis represented the Lithuanian Christian Democratic Party but some time before December 1918 switched to the Party of National Progress.

=== Council of Lithuania ===
In November 1917, Petrulis joined five other members of the Council of Lithuania and traveled to the Lithuanian conference in Bern in Switzerland. The conferences lasted eight days and discussed a number of specific issues, including territorial claims, strategy for gaining independence, form of government (democratic republic vs. constitutional monarchy), etc. Petrulis spoke in favor of the monarchy. He was particularly active in discussing the issues at the Diocese of Vilnius. Petrulis and Juozas Purickis wrote a resolution calling for the resignation of the diocese administrator Kazimierz Mikołaj Michalkiewicz and the newly appointed curia of Vilnius Cathedral. The conference further resolved to appeal to the pope requesting to appoint a Lithuanian as the next bishop of Vilnius, begin Lithuanian language, literature, and history lessons at Vilnius Priest Seminary, and inform the Centre Party of the Reichstag and other influential politicians of the situation. Petrulis and three others visited Francesco Marchetti Selvaggiani, representative of the Holy See in Bern, to discuss these issues. Upon return to Vilnius, Petrulis worked to draft a memorandum to the papal nuncio Eugenio Pacelli – two other priests (Kazimieras Steponas Šaulys and Justinas Staugaitis) refused to be involved.

In December 1917, the Council of Lithuania debated proclaiming Lithuania's independence. Germany demanded that the council adopt an act calling for "a firm and permanent alliance" with Germany which became known as the Act of 11 December 1917. Petrulis supported it and opposed making edits to the German-approved text. Four members of the council resigned in protest of the Act of 11 December, but the council managed to find a compromise, though Petrulis, Vladas Mironas, and Antanas Smetona were most reluctant to adopt the compromise solution which let to the adoption of the Act of Independence of Lithuania on 16 February 1918. Petrulis supported constitutional monarchy in Lithuania and voted for inviting Wilhelm Karl, Duke of Urach, to become the King of Lithuania.

In January 1918, Petrulis and Jonas Basanavičius were tasked with gathering information on and working to preserve various archives from destruction during the war. In January–April 1918, Petrulis visited various locations (Hyervyaty, Širvintos, Varniany, Žasliai, Maišiagala) to explain the Council of Lithuania to the people. In March 1918, Petrulis proposed a resolution calling for local commissions to review German war requisitions.

Petrulis returned to Switzerland in September 1918 for the third Lithuanian conference in Lausanne. On the way, he and other members of the Council of Lithuania visited Wilhelm Karl, Duke of Urach, the elected King of Lithuania, and papal nuncio Eugenio Pacelli. Petrulis was secretary of the conference, but it broke down due to disagreements whether Lithuania should rely on Germany or on the Entente.

Petrulis was elected to a three-member commission to edit and finalize the First Temporary Constitution of Lithuania which was adopted on 13 November 1918. Together with Petras Klimas and Kazys Bizauskas, he was later elected to a commission that was supposed to edit all laws adopted by the Council of Lithuania. On 14 March 1919, Petrulis was elected to the Presidium of the Council of Lithuania as its second secretary but this presidium resigned on 4 April 1919. The council's role diminished significantly after the formation of the cabinet of Lithuania and election of the President of Lithuania Antanas Smetona.

=== Party of National Progress ===
Petrulis was a candidate of the Party of National Progress in the April 1920 election to the Constituent Assembly of Lithuania. He was nominated in two electoral districts – Raseiniai (2nd on the list) and Panevėžys (4th on the list). Petrulis was the secretary of the party's central committee and one of the leaders of its electoral campaign. Petrulis personally campaigned in Punia, Nemajūnai, Jieznas, Žiežmariai, Kaišiadorys. However, the party received only 1.7% of the vote and no members of the party were elected to the assembly. In August 1920, Petrulis organized party's conference. He then withdrew from political life, likely due to disagreements with party's leadership or due to pressure from ecclesiastical superiors.

== Legacy ==
Books on Petrulis' biography were published by Viktoras Alekna in 1996 and by Algimantas Katilius in 2017.

In 1998, Lietuvos paštas issued a stamp in Petrulis' memory. Memorials to Petrulis were erected at his birthplace in 1999, at the churchyard in Pivašiūnai in 2006, in Paparčiai in 2008, and near the high school in Maišiagala in 2013. Streets were named after Petrulis in Pivašiūnai (2006) and Vilnius (2007). Musninkai named the town's main square and gymnasium after Petrulis in 2010–2011.

== Bibliography ==
- Čepėnas, Pranas (1986). Naujųjų laikų Lietuvos istorija (in Lithuanian). Vol. II. Chicago: Dr. Kazio Griniaus Fondas. OCLC 3220435.
- Eidintas, Alfonsas (2015). Antanas Smetona and His Lithuania: From the National Liberation Movement to an Authoritarian Regime (1893-1940). On the Boundary of Two Worlds. Translated by Alfred Erich Senn. Brill Rodopi. ISBN 978-9-004-30203-7.
- Eidintas, Alfonsas; Žalys, Vytautas; Senn, Alfred Erich (1999). Tuskenis, Edvardas (ed.). Lithuania in European Politics: The Years of the First Republic, 1918-1940 (Paperback ed.). New York: St. Martin's Press. ISBN 0-312-22458-3.
- Ereminas, Gintautas (2015). "Lietuvių švietimas Vilniaus krašte 1920–1939 m." Gimtasai kraštas (in Lithuanian). I: 18–34. ISSN 2029-0101.
- Górski, Tadeusz (1975). "Kazimierz Mikołaj Michalkiewicz". Polskiego Słownika Biograficznego (in Polish). Vol. XX. Archived from the original on 8 September 2024.
- Grigaravičius, Algirdas (June 2020). "Donatas ir Filomena Malinauskai – tautinio judėjimo veikėjai" (PDF). Voruta (in Lithuanian). 2 (868): 8–16. ISSN 1392-0677.
- Grigaravičius, Algirdas (28 September 2019). "Keletas Jokūbo Šerno politinės veiklos epizodų" (PDF). Voruta (in Lithuanian). 9 (863): 8. ISSN 1392-0677.
- Karlonas, Jonas (June 2022). "Keletas akimirkų iš Maišiagalos parapijos gyvenimo" (PDF). Voruta (in Lithuanian). 2 (876): 21–29. ISSN 1392-0677.
- Katilius, Algimantas (2017). Vasario 16-osios Akto signataras kunigas Alfonsas Petrulis (in Lithuanian). Vilnius: Lietuvos nacionalinis muziejus. ISBN 978-609-478-001-1.
- Kučas, Antanas (1979). Arkivyskupas Jurgis Matulaitis-Matulevičius. Gyvosios krikščionybės apaštalas (in Lithuanian). Chicago: Draugas. OCLC 6485634.
- Maksimaitis, Mindaugas (2011). Mažoji konstituanta: Lietuvos taryba atkuriant valstybingumą (in Lithuanian). Justitia. ISBN 978-9955-616-65-8.
- Matusas, Jonas (1939). Šaulių sąjungos istorija (in Lithuanian). Kaunas: Šaulių sąjunga.
- Merkys, Vytautas (2006). Tautiniai santykiai Vilniaus vyskupijoje 1798–1918 m. (in Lithuanian). Versus aureus. ISBN 9955699426.
- Truska, Liudas (31 October 2025) [2018]. "Lietuvos Taryba". Visuotinė lietuvių enciklopedija (in Lithuanian). Mokslo ir enciklopedijų leidybos centras.
- Zinkevičius, Zigmas (1992). Lietuvių kalbos istorija (in Lithuanian). Vol. 5: Bendrinės kalbos iškilimas. Vilnius: Mokslo ir enciklopedijų leidykla. OCLC 34077762.
