= Juozapas Kukta =

Lithuanian Roman Catholic bishop

- Bishop of Kaišiadorys
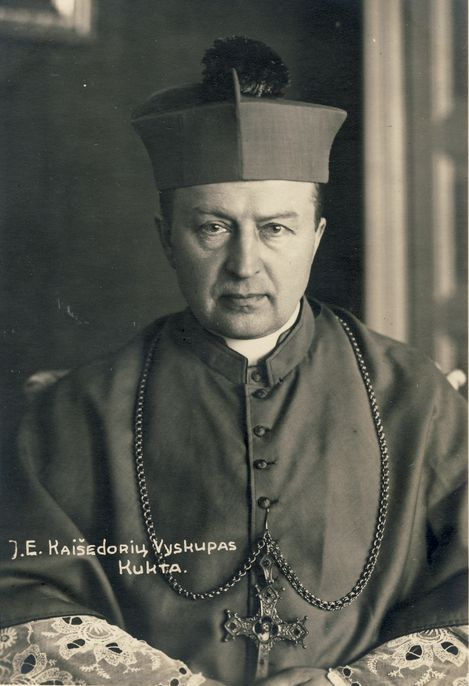
- Church: Roman Catholic Church
- Diocese: Diocese of Kaišiadorys
- Predecessor: Diocese established
- Successor: Teofilius Matulionis

Orders
- Ordination: 31 December 1898
- Consecration: 1 May 1926 by Jurgis Matulaitis-Matulevičius

Personal details
- Born: 3 February 1873 Trakiniai, Russian Empire
- Died: 16 June 1942 (aged 69) Kaunas, Generalbezirk Litauen
- Buried: Kaišiadorys Cathedral
- Denomination: Roman Catholic
- Education: Vilnius Priest Seminary; Saint Petersburg Roman Catholic Theological Academy

Juozapas Kukta (3 February 1873 – 16 June 1942) was a Lithuanian clergyman and the first bishop of the Roman Catholic Diocese of Kaišiadorys (1926–1942).

Educated at the Vilnius Priest Seminary and Saint Petersburg Roman Catholic Theological Academy, Kukta was ordained priest in 1898 and was assigned to Vilnius. He became rector of the Church of Saint Nicholas which was the first and only church to offer services in the Lithuanian language. He later was a parson of the Church of All Saints (1908–1917) and canon of the curia of Vilnius Cathedral. In 1922, he was arrested by the Polish police and deported from Vilnius. He was then appointed administrator of the portion of the Diocese of Vilnius which remained within the territory of interwar Lithuania. In 1926, this portion became the Diocese of Kaišiadorys and Kukta was appointed its first bishop. Kukta completed the construction of the Neo-Gothic Kaišiadorys Cathedral and bishop's residence. He organized the first diocesan eucharistic congress in 1931 and synod in 1936.

In Vilnius, Kukta became an active participant in various Lithuanian societies, including the Lithuanian Mutual Aid Society of Vilnius which organized a Lithuanian school, Society of Saint Zita which supported Lithuanian female servants, and Lithuanian Education Society Rytas which organized Lithuanian primary schools in Vilnius Region. During World War I, he was a board member of the Lithuanian Society for the Relief of War Sufferers. Kukta attended the Great Seimas of Vilnius in 1905 and Vilnius Conference in 1917.

== Biography ==
=== Early life and education ===
Juozapas Kukta was born on 3 February 1873 in Trakiniai near Kurkliai to a well off family of Lithuanian farmers. He had seven siblings, including the younger brother Martynas Kukta who became one of the first Lithuanian printers.

Kukta attended the Russian primary in school in Kurkliai for three years. Upon graduation in 1887, he travelled to Vilnius where he lived with his elder brother Jokūbas and studied at a four-year gymnasium. In 1891, he enrolled at Vilnius Priest Seminary. He was then sent to study at the Saint Petersburg Roman Catholic Theological Academy where he earned his master's degree in theology in 1899. He was ordained priest on 31 December 1898 in Saint Petersburg.

=== Priest in Vilnius ===
In 1899, Kuktas was first assigned as a vicar to the Church of St. Theresa in Vilnius. After a prolonged fight between Lithuanian intellectuals and the Bishop of Vilnius, the Church of Saint Nicholas was granted to the Lithuanian community on 17 December 1901. It became the first church in the city which held masses in Lithuanian. Kukta became its rector and the church became a center of the Lithuanian cultural life in the city. The Church of Saint Nicholas stood abandoned for several years and needed repairs. However, the Tsarist authorities would not issue permits until Kukta promised not to solicit donations and finance the repairs from personal funds.

Kukta was also a chaplain and teacher of religion at the Vilnius Commercial School, a four-year city school, and a juvenile prison until 1909. Between February 1906 and August 1908, he taught the Lithuanian language at Vilnius Priest Seminary. He used a Lithuanian grammar published by Povilas Januševičius but did not have philological background and many of lessons were unstructured. When Petras Kraujalis was reassigned to Hrodna, Kukta took his place and became the parson of the Church of All Saints in 1908. He continued in this role until 1917 when he was appointed canon of the curia of Vilnius Cathedral. Kukta held various positions in the consistory, including book censor (1909), examiner (1910), member of the ecclesiastical court (1911).

Kukta was involved in mediating the disputed between the Poles and Lithuanians. Many areas of the Diocese of Vilnius were ethnically mixed. Influenced by the Lithuanian National Revival, Lithuanians started demanding that the Lithuanian language would be used in church services, but this was opposed by the Polish-speaking population leading to frequent conflicts. In October 1907, when the Tsarist authorities accused bishop Edward Ropp of, among other things, discriminating against the Lithuanians, 42 Lithuanian priests, including Kukta, published a protest letter defending the bishop in the Russian press. In February 1909, a gathering of diocesan priests, organized by the diocesan administrator Kazimierz Mikołaj Michalkiewicz, appointed in place of Edward Ropp, agreed in principle that ethnically mixed parishes should have a bilingual priest and that sermons should be delivered in both languages. It also established a five-member (two Poles, two Lithuanians, and a chairman appointed by the administrator) commission to mediate local disputes. The Lithuanian members were Kukta and Alfonsas Petrulis. Kukta worked in this commission until 1920.

=== Activist in Vilnius ===
Kukta supported the Lithuanian press. While the Lithuanian press ban was in effect, he held a cache of Lithuanian publications at the Church of Saint Nicholas. Once the ban was lifted in 1904, he assisted in organizing the first Lithuanian daily Vilniaus žinios and helped his brother Martynas to open a printing shop. He also collected funds for the publication of Draugija magazine edited by Adomas Jakštas. In 1913, he was elected to the editorial board of the biweekly newspaper Aušra.

In 1904, Kukta was elected treasurer of the newly established Lithuanian Mutual Aid Society of Vilnius. He helped organizing a shelter for poor Lithuanian children in 1905 which became the first Lithuanian primary school in Vilnius. It was sponsored by the Mutual Aid Society which and initially housed at the clergy house of the Church of Saint Nicholas. Kukta taught religion at this school. He also taught at the two-year evening courses for older Lithuanian girls. The goal of these courses were to prepare teachers for village schools. He led the courses until 1917. Kukta was active in the Community of St. Nicholas for female servants which later grew into the Society of Saint Zita; he was its first chairman and later treasurer.

The Lithuanian press ban was lifted in May 1904. Kukta and 154 other Lithuanian activists signed a letter to the Tsar Nicholas II thanking him for lifting the ban. Varpas criticized the letter and the activists as bootlickers, but the letter was not actually delivered to the Tsar as it read more like a veiled complaint about Russification than a genuine expression of gratitude. During the Russian Revolution in 1905, Kukta was one of 15 members of the committee organizing the Great Seimas of Vilnius. At the same time, he organized a gathering of Lithuanian priests from all three dioceses (Vilnius, Samogitia, and Sejny) that had significant Lithuanian population. The main purpose of the gathering was to discuss formation of the Lithuanian Christian Democratic Party.

Kukta was one of the organizers of the First Lithuanian Art Exhibition which opened in January 1907. In 1913, Kukta was elected to the board of the newly established Lithuanian Education Society Rytas which organized Lithuanian primary schools in Vilnius Region. The society was headquartered at the clergy house of the Church of All Saints and Kukta acted as its treasurer and was elected its vice-chairman in 1917. At the initiative of Kukta, the society established pedagogical courses and financed evening courses for adults that he directed.

=== World War I ===
During World War I, Kukta was a member of the central committee of the Lithuanian Society for the Relief of War Sufferers. He was its vice-chairman in 1914–1918 and chairman in 1918–1922.

In January 1916, Kukta was a member of an informal political club which discussed various political issues facing Lithuania and Lithuanians. In May 1917, 44 Polish activists signed a memorandum to Theobald von Bethmann Hollweg, Chancellor of the German Empire, claiming that areas around Vilnius were Polish and should be incorporated into Poland with the preservation of autonomy for other nationalities. Lithuanian activists organized a response and 19 men, including Kutka, signed a protest memorandum arguing for an independent Lithuania. Kazimierz Mikołaj Michalkiewicz, who signed the Polish memorandum, sanctioned five Lithuanian priests who signed the Lithuanian memorandum by suspending them for a month and holding them in a monastery in Hrodna. This action prompted protests by priests and activists. The matter was investigated by the papal nuncio Eugenio Pacelli (future Pope Pius XII) and he recommended that Michalkiewicz be removed from the diocese. The Vatican withdrew Pacelli's appeal, but the Germans, dissatisfied with Michalkiewicz, interned him on 19 June 1918, at the Maria Laach Abbey in the Rhineland.

In September 1917, Kukta attended Vilnius Conference which elected the Council of Lithuania. In 1918, Jurgis Matulaitis-Matulevičius became the Bishop of Vilnius. Kukta was his old classmate and became a close advisor and vice-official of the curia. In March 1920, apostolic visitor Ambrogio Ratti (future Pope Pius XI) and his secretary Ermenegildo Pellegrinetti travelled from Warsaw to Riga via Vilnius and Kaunas. Kukta accompanied them from Vilnius to Kaunas. They stopped in Kaišiadorys where they visited the town's church that was under construction (future cathedral).

In August 1920, Kukta was arrested by the Bolsheviks, but was released the next day. In January 1921, Kukta was elected vice-chairman and treasurer of the Provisional Committee of Vilnius Lithuanians. On 20 January 1922, Kukta was arrested by the Polish police and held in Lukiškės Prison. He was accused of espionage and threatened a death sentence. However, on 6 February 1922, Kukta and 32 other Lithuanian and Belarusian activists were deported from Vilnius, which was then part of the Republic of Central Lithuania.

=== Administrator in Kaišiadorys ===
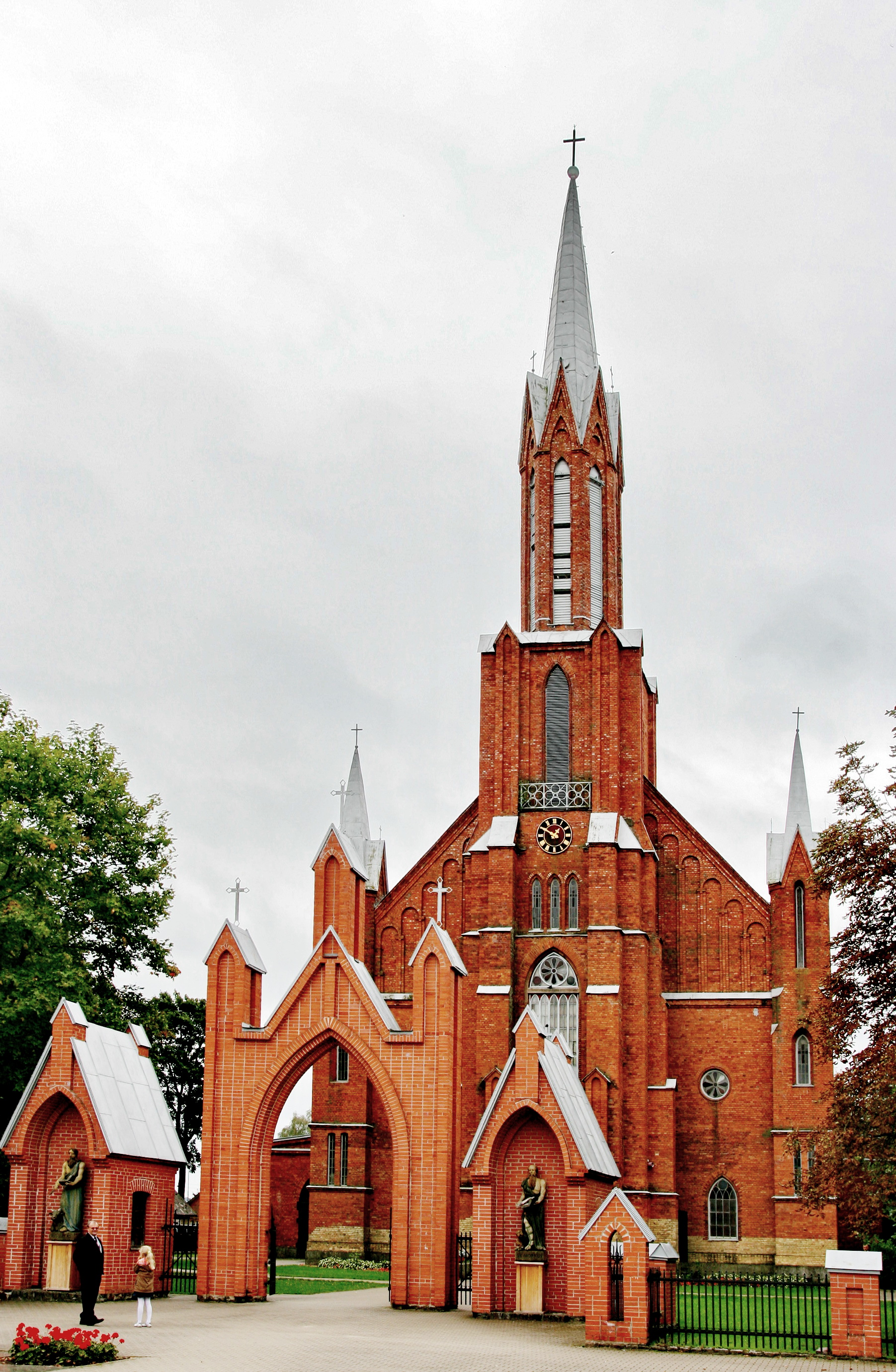
Kaišiadorys Cathedral

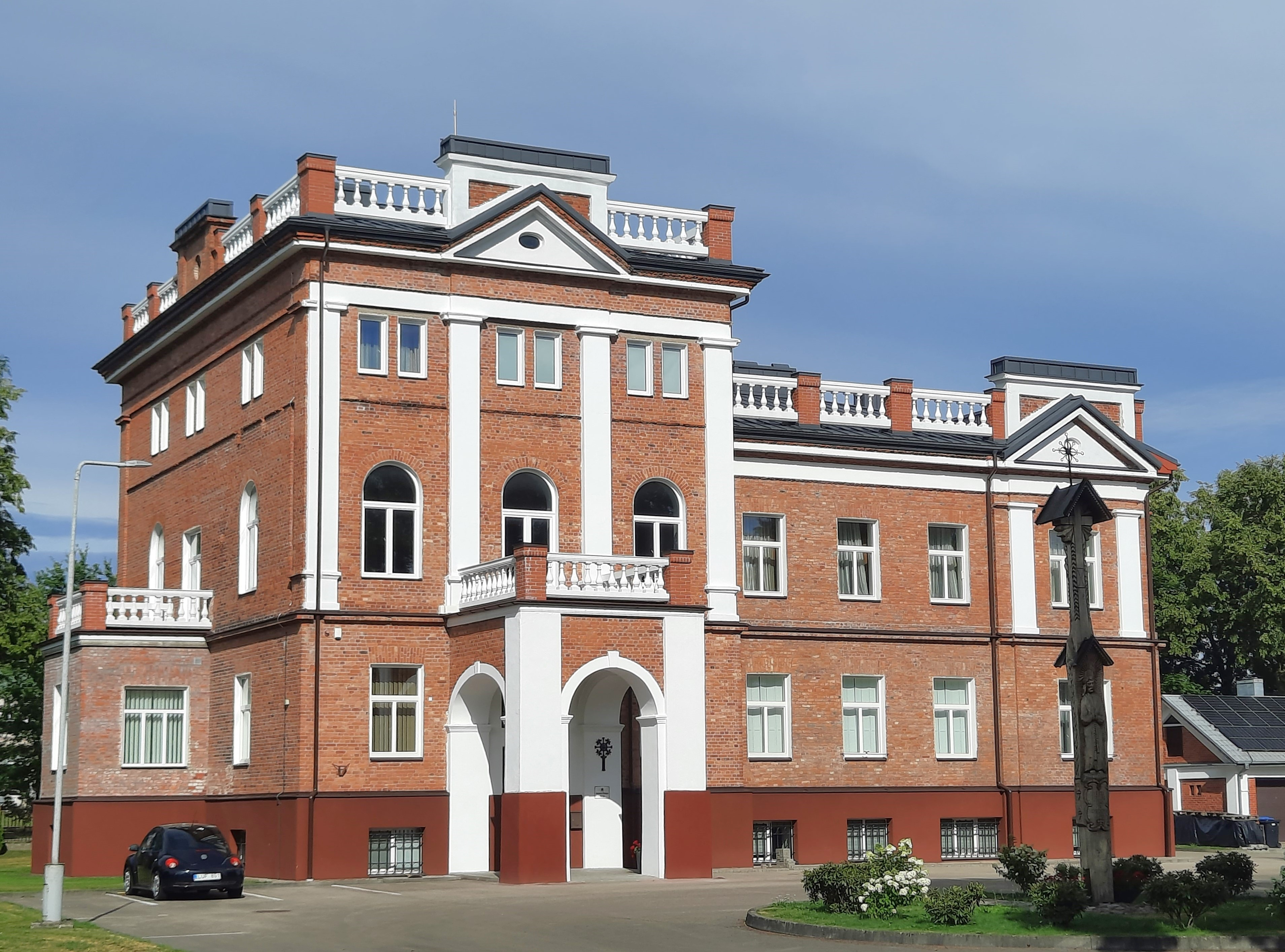
Bishop's residence in Kaišiadorys

Kukta then settled in Kaišiadorys where on 3 March 1922 he was appointed by bishop Matulaitis-Matulevičius administrator of the portion of the Diocese of Vilnius which remained within the territory of interwar Lithuania. This area had 5 deaneries, 63 churches, 82 priests, and about 215,000 Catholics. Since Lithuania bitterly disputed Vilnius Region with the Second Polish Republic, Lithuanians hoped to persuade the pope to govern the Diocese of Vilnius directly from Rome thus not acknowledging Poland's claim to the city. To that end, Lithuania sent a delegation of Justinas Staugaitis, Stasys Šalkauskis, Juozas Purickis, and Kukta. However, they were seen only by the cardinal Pietro Gasparri who rebuked the request.

Instead, the Holy See concluded the Concordat of 1925 with Poland which caused a termination of diplomatic relations between the Holy See and Lithuania. On 5 April 1926, Pope Pius XI unilaterally established and reorganized the Lithuanian ecclesiastical province, established the Diocese of Kaišiadorys, and appointed Kukta as its first bishop. Kukta was consecrated on 1 May 1926 by Jurgis Matulaitis-Matulevičius assisted by Juozapas Skvireckas and Antanas Karosas. On 16 May, Kukta assisted with the consecration of Mečislovas Reinys.

=== Bishop of Kaišiadorys ===
The Kaišiadorys Diocese was the smallest among the Lithuanian dioceses. It was long and narrow, stretching along the Polish–Lithuanian Neutral Strip. It did not have larger cities – Kaišiadorys according to the 1923 Lithuanian census had only 1,535 residents and had no suitable church. Therefore, Kukta's installation took place at the Church of St. George in Žasliai. The Neo-Gothic Kaišiadorys Cathedral, under construction since 1908, was completed in 1932 and consecrated by Kukta on 10 May 1936. Kukta constructed the bishop's palace which was completed in 1933. The building was designed by the architect Wacław Michniewicz and is considered one of the most beautiful buildings in the city. He also established a park next to the palace which is now the main city park named after president Algirdas Brazauskas.

During his tenure as bishop, Kukta established more than ten new parishes and reorganized the diocese into nine deaneries. He frequently conducted parish canonical visitations, visiting many of them three times. He authored 17 pastoral letters. Kukta organized the first diocesan eucharistic congress in June 1931 and synod in May 1936. The eucharistic congress was organized to mark the 40th anniversary of the papal encyclical Rerum novarum and the 50th anniversary of the first International Eucharistic Congress in Lille. According to organizers, the congress was attended by about 25,000 to 30,000 people; police reports showed attendance at 12,000 people.

=== World War II ===
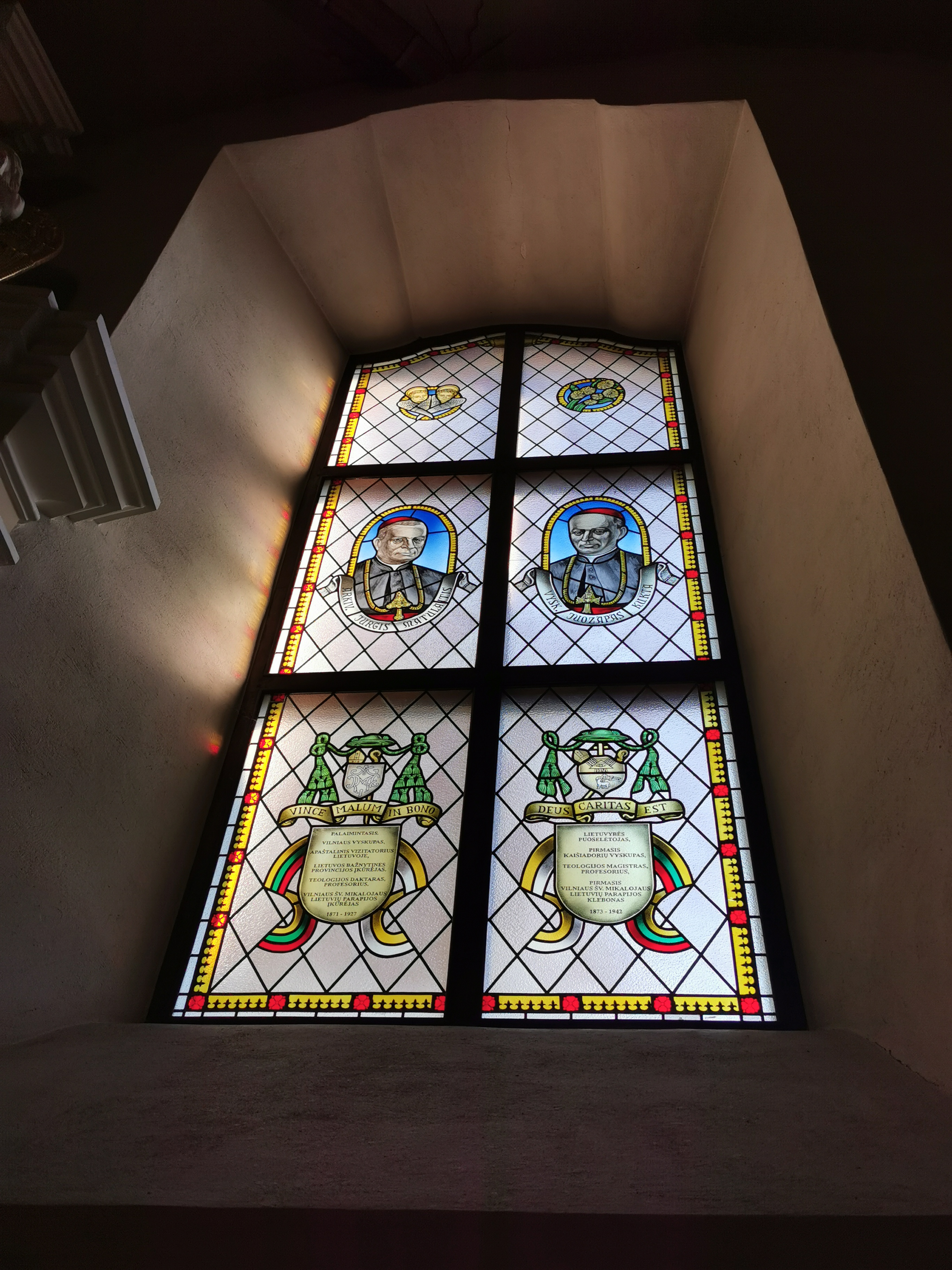
Stained glass window depicting Kukta and Jurgis Matulaitis-Matulevičius at the Church of Saint Nicholas

In June 1941, soon after the Soviet occupation of Lithuania, Kukta and his curia were evicted by the Soviets from the bishop's residence and were told to relocate to a village. Only after several appeals, they were allowed to stay in Kaišiadorys. Kukta and other bishops petitioned various Soviet officials protesting the closure of Kaunas Priest Seminary. Kukta and Vincentas Borisevičius personally delivered a memorandum of Lithuanian bishops to Nikolai Pozdnyakov and Mečislovas Gedvilas. The memorandum protested the Sovietization policies and violation of church's rights. At the start of the German invasion of the Soviet Union, Soviet soldiers searched for Kukta but he dressed in farmer's clothing and hid among the locals.

In August 1941, after the German occupation of Lithuania, a meeting of Lithuanian bishops decided to express gratitude to the Generalkommissar Theodor Adrian von Renteln for "liberating Lithuania from the Bolshevik yoke". Kukta and Vincentas Brizgys agreed to deliver the letter. However, Kukta did not become more publicly involved with the political life.

Kukta developed liver issues and his gallbladder was operated by professor Vincas Kanauka. Kukta died on 16 June 1942 and was buried in a crypt of under the main altar of the Kaišiadorys Cathedral.

== Legacy ==
In 1992, a memorial cross was erected at the birthplace of Kukta in Trakiniai. In 2024, a granite and stainless steel sculpture depicting a mitre and honoring Kukta by sculptor Vilmantas Balynas was installed in the city park of Kaišiadorys. In 2003, stained glass window by artist Algirdas Dovydėnas was installed in the Church of Saint Nicholas in Vilnius. It depicts Kutka and Jurgis Matulaitis-Matulevičius.

Two biographies of Kukta were published – in 1990 by Jonas Laurinavičius and in 2003 by Nikodemas Švogžlys-Milžinas.

In February 2023, commemorating his 150th birth anniversary, Kukta was recognized as an honorary citizen of Kaišiadorys. In October 2024, Liudas Gira Street in Kaišiadorys was renamed after Kukta.
