= Lithuanian Education Society Rytas =

Roman Catholic Society

The Lithuanian Education Society Rytas (Lithuanian: Lietuvių švietimo draugija „Rytas“; "rytas" means morning or dawn) was a Roman Catholic society fostering education in the Lithuanian language mostly in the Vilnius Region, then fiercely contested between Lithuania and the Second Polish Republic, now split between Lithuania and Belarus. Established in 1913, the society maintained some 100 primary schools (mostly one-room schools), 50 evening classes, Vytautas the Great Gymnasium and Teacher's Seminary in Vilnius (Wilno, Vilna) in 1927. Due to political tensions between Poland and Lithuania as well as wider Polonization policies, Rytas faced increasing difficulties and restrictions in maintaining its schools. Similar situation existed with Polish schools in Lithuania (see Lithuanization). The situation continued to worsen as both sides increased restrictions in retribution. As schools were closed, Rytas shifted its focus to maintaining community reading rooms. After the death of Józef Piłsudski in 1935, the rooms were often raided by police and closed. Eventually, the society was abolished by Polish authorities in February 1938. Only the Vytautas the Great Gymnasium was allowed to operate. After the Polish ultimatum of March 1938, diplomatic relations were established between Poland and Lithuania and Rytas was allowed to operate again in May 1939. It could not resume its activities due to World War II and was abolished again soon after the occupation of Lithuania by the Soviet Union in June 1940. The society, with the same mission of promoting Lithuanian-language education, was reestablished in 2004.

== History ==
=== Background and establishment ===
After the failed Uprising of 1863, the Tsarist regime enacted strict Russification policies: the Lithuanian press was prohibited, all non-government schools were closed, and government schools prohibited the use of the Lithuanian language. The restrictions were lifted in 1904 and Lithuanians organized societies Saulė (Sun) in 1906 in Kovno Governorate and Žiburys (light, beacon) in 1905 in the Suwałki Governorate to fund and operate Lithuanian schools.

The developments in the Vilna Governorate, which had an ethnically mixed population, were slower. In February 1907, Lithuanian activists (Antanas Smetona, brothers Antanas and Jonas Vileišis, priests Juozas Tumas-Vaižgantas and Vladas Mironas, and others) established educational Society Vilniaus Aušra (Dawn of Vilnius). The first chairman was Smetona and Tumas was his secretary, but soon they resigned. The new chairman was priest Juozas Bagdonavičius (Bagdonas) and Liudas Gira was his secretary. The society was active both in Kovno and Vilna Governorates and established 17 local chapters. Most active of them were in Alanta, Žasliai, Bagaslaviškis. However, Tsarist authorities closed several chapters and the society was liquidated in December 1908.

The idea of an educational society was once again raised by the intellectuals in a meeting of Aušra publishers in Vilnius in 1911. Its statute was approved by the Ministry of Internal Affairs on 29 November 1912 and the founding meeting took place at the clergy house of the Church of All Saints, Vilnius on 31 January 1913. The meeting, chaired by Jonas Basanavičius, elected a seven-member board, which included priest Jonas Steponavičius (chairman), teacher Juozas Kairiūkštis (vice-chairman), Juozapas Kukta (treasurer), writer Liudas Gira (secretary), priests Vladas Mironas and Alfonsas Petrulis, and Jonas Basanavičius. The meeting also elected two candidates to the board – Antanas Smetona and Klemensas Maliukevičius.

=== Russian Empire and German occupation ===
The society's goals were to establish and fund Lithuanian-language primary schools, evening classes for adults, a seminary for teachers, reading rooms, bookshops, and other educational institutions in the Roman Catholic spirit. It published its news in Viltis and Aušra and encouraged establishment of local chapters. By the end of 1913, according to a list published in Šaltinis, the society had 31 chapters, including three in Vilnius. Rytas wanted to establish grammar schools (Школа грамоты) but was allowed to organize only one-year or two-year schools and only if a qualified teacher was available. The first schools were organized in Dieveniškės, Linkmenys, Musteika, Perloja, Švenčionėliai, Valkininkai. During the first three years, Rytas established about 120 schools.

During World War I, from about August 1915 to November 1918, Vilnius Region was part of the German Oberost. Initially, the Germans banned Rytas, but after modifications to its statute, it was allowed to operate schools but not to establish new chapters. Despite difficult wartime conditions, Rytas established courses for teachers, which were directed by Aleksandras Stulginskis and which grew to a seminary, and took over the Lithuanian gymnasium, established by Jonas Basanavičius, Mykolas Biržiška, and Povilas Gaidelionis in October 1915. It was the second (after the Panevėžys Gymnasium which opened a week earlier) gymnasium to teach in the Lithuanian language.

=== Second Polish Republic ===
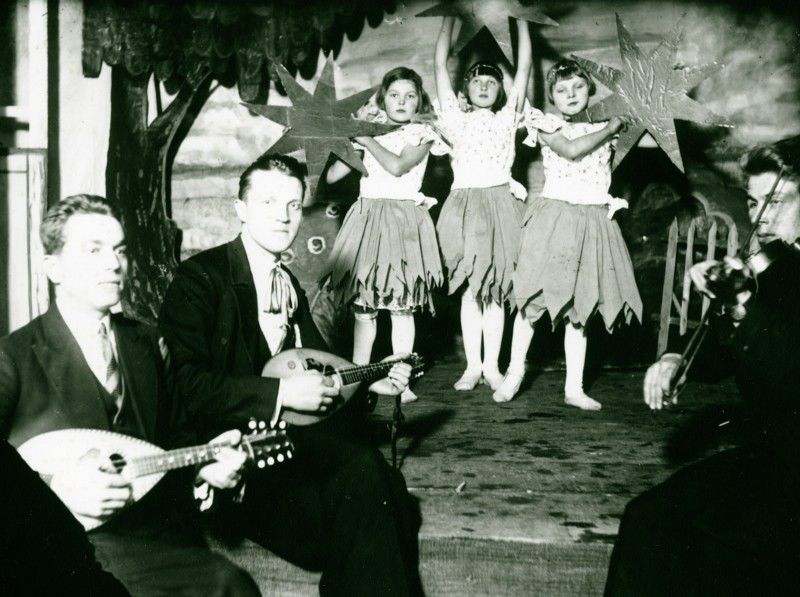
Ballet performance at Rytas' school in Kukutėliai in 1935

After the Żeligowski's Mutiny in October 1920, Vilnius region was incorporated into the Republic of Central Lithuania, a puppet state of the Second Polish Republic. Almost immediately Lithuanian organizations, including Rytas, faced increased scrutiny and restrictions. The Lithuanian gymnasium for girls was closed in August 1921 and the boys' gymnasium (renamed to Vytautas the Great Gymnasium) was forcibly removed from its premises in October 1921. In 1923, the regional education commission began demanding that each school independently obtained a permit which was valid for only a year (multi-year permits were introduced in 1927). The commission had to approve each teacher, and it refused to approve if they were not Polish citizens or did not have certificates of morality (świadectwo moralności), i.e. a proof of correct political leanings. For example, in 1926, of 106 proposed teachers only 56 were approved. In July 1924, Minister Stanisław Grabski sponsored a law which regulated schools of ethnic minorities. Other requirements and limitations applied to teachers' education, textbooks, classroom hygiene, etc. These requirements particularly affected Ukrainian and Belarusian schools. Attitudes towards Lithuanian schools were more lenient, perhaps in hopes of normalizing the tensions between Poland and Lithuania.

The situation of Lithuanian schools and Rytas Society began deteriorating when 44 schools and the teachers' seminary were closed on 4–5 October 1927. At the same time, seminary's director Kristupas Čibiras, Rytas' chairman Petras Kraujalis, and 23 other Lithuanian teachers and activists were arrested. It was a retribution for the Lithuanian decision to close more than 60 Polish schools in Lithuania. In 1928, Rytas maintained the gymnasium in Vilnius with 366 students, a vocational evening school, teachers' courses, 103 schools with 3,560 students, and 80 evening courses for adults with 1,765 students. Of the schools, only 52 had official permits. Some of the closed or non-certified schools continued to operate illegally.

Teachers at Rytas schools often initiated the establishments of a local chapter of the Society of Saint Casimir for the Education and Care of Young People which became more active in 1927. The two societies shared similar goals and cooperated with each other; for example, sharing Lithuanian publications. In 1931, with funding from Lithuania, Rytas purchased Vileišis Palace and moved its headquarters to the first floor. The second floor and the attic was rented by the Lithuanian Scientific Society.

In spring 1931, the Polish Sejm adopted a new law which further restricted private schools. No new permits were issued while old schools were closed by various inspectors. The number of schools decreased from 91 in 1931 to 73 in 1932. New instructions from the Polish Ministry of Education prescribed requirements for school buildings which were practically impossible to meet – new dedicated buildings had to build. In 1933, Rytas had only 21 approved schools and of those only 16 had approved teachers. Realizing that it was losing ground, Rytas began focusing on education of adults and establishing reading rooms. Most of these rooms were headed by now-unemployed teachers, others by university or gymnasium students. The rooms organized readings of books and periodicals, discussions, lectures, courses for children and adults, various social events and gatherings, etc. In the 1934/35 school year, the society maintained 76 reading rooms which registered 244,805 visitors. The officials disapproved the reading rooms and frequently fined them for various minor infractions.

=== Liquidation ===
Ludwik Bociański, appointed voivode of Wilno in December 1935, took particularly strict measures against Rytas. Police raided reading rooms, confiscated the books, and closed them due to "threat to public order and security". In twelve instances, curators of the reading rooms were exiled. In November 1936, police raided Rytas headquarters and confiscated some of its funds. The measures were effective: in March 1936, Rytas had four schools and 77 reading rooms; a year later, it had only two schools with 77 students and 14 reading rooms. Rytas activities in the Białystok Voivodeship were prohibited citing concerns over border security. No new initiatives received official approvals and the society was effectively forced to cease its activities.

Sensing that it could be abolished, in 1937–1938, Rytas transferred its archives and movable property to the Lithuanian Scientific Society, which was headquartered in the same Vileišis Palace. The move did not help as both Rytas and the Scientific Society, as well as seven other Lithuanian organizations, were suspended by the starosta of Vilnius in January 1938. Rytas appealed the decision to voivode Bociański, but received a negative response on 25 February and was officially closed on 28 February. Rytas' property was taken over by attorney Stefan Wilanowski and the last school in Dainava was closed.

=== Briefly reestablished ===
After the Polish ultimatum of March 1938, diplomatic relations were established between Poland and Lithuania and Rytas was allowed to operate again on 20 May 1939. In June, it received its property back – Vileišis Palace, now subject to a 60,000 złoty mortgage to the Bank Gospodarstwa Krajowego, 33,303 złoty receivables, and 7,745 złoty payables.

Rytas was told that no schools would be approved if they were less than 3 kilometres (1.9 mi) from a public Polish school and instead concentrated on reestablishing local chapters and reading rooms. From June to August, Rytas established 103 chapters with about 1,500 members. Further activities were interrupted by World War II. After the invasion of Poland in September 1939, Vilnius Region was occupied by the Soviet Union and then partially transferred to Lithuania in October according to the Soviet–Lithuanian Mutual Assistance Treaty. Due to wartime disruptions and regime changes, the society was not active. It registered with the Lithuanian government in February 1940 and called a general meeting in March searching for a new mission – a lot of its functions were taken over by the Lithuanian government and it could no longer rely on funding from the government or the public. Rytas, along with other Lithuanian organizations, was abolished by the new Soviet regime following the occupation of Lithuania by the Soviet Union in June 1940. The last board meeting of Rytas took place on 6 July 1940.

== Chairmen ==
The chairmen of the society were:

- Priest Jonas Steponavičius (31 January 1913 – 14 April 1915)
- Juozas Kairiūkštis (14 April 1915 – 8 November 1915)
- Priest Mečislovas Reinys (8 November 1915 – 13 December 1916; 30 August 1918 – 19 June 1922)
- Aleksandras Stulginskis (13 December 1916 – 30 August 1918)
- Priest Petras Kraujalis (19 June 1922 – 14 August 1933)
- Priest Kristupas Čibiras (14 August 1933 – 28 February 1938; 20 May 1939 – July 1940)

== Since 2004 ==
Rytas Society was reestablished in April 2004 with the help of the Vilnija society. Lithuanian activists felt that areas of southeastern Lithuania where Electoral Action of Poles in Lithuania won majorities in the municipal elections neglected the education in the Lithuanian language and decided to reestablished Rytas to counter this bias. Algimantas Masaitis, long-time director of a Lithuanian school in Marijampolis, Vilnius District Municipality, became its chairman. The society organizes lectures, events, conferences, excursions, confers awards to distinguished teachers, provides students with school supplies, books, etc.
