= Petrulis =

- Lithuanian surname
- m.: Petrulis
- f.: (unmarried): Petrulytė
- f.: (married): Petrulienė

Petrulis is a Lithuanian language family name. It may refer to:

- Vytautas Petrulis, Lithuanian politician
- Algirdas Petrulis, Lithuanian painter
- Alfonsas Petrulis
