= Martynas Kukta =

Lithuanian publisher (1885–1956)

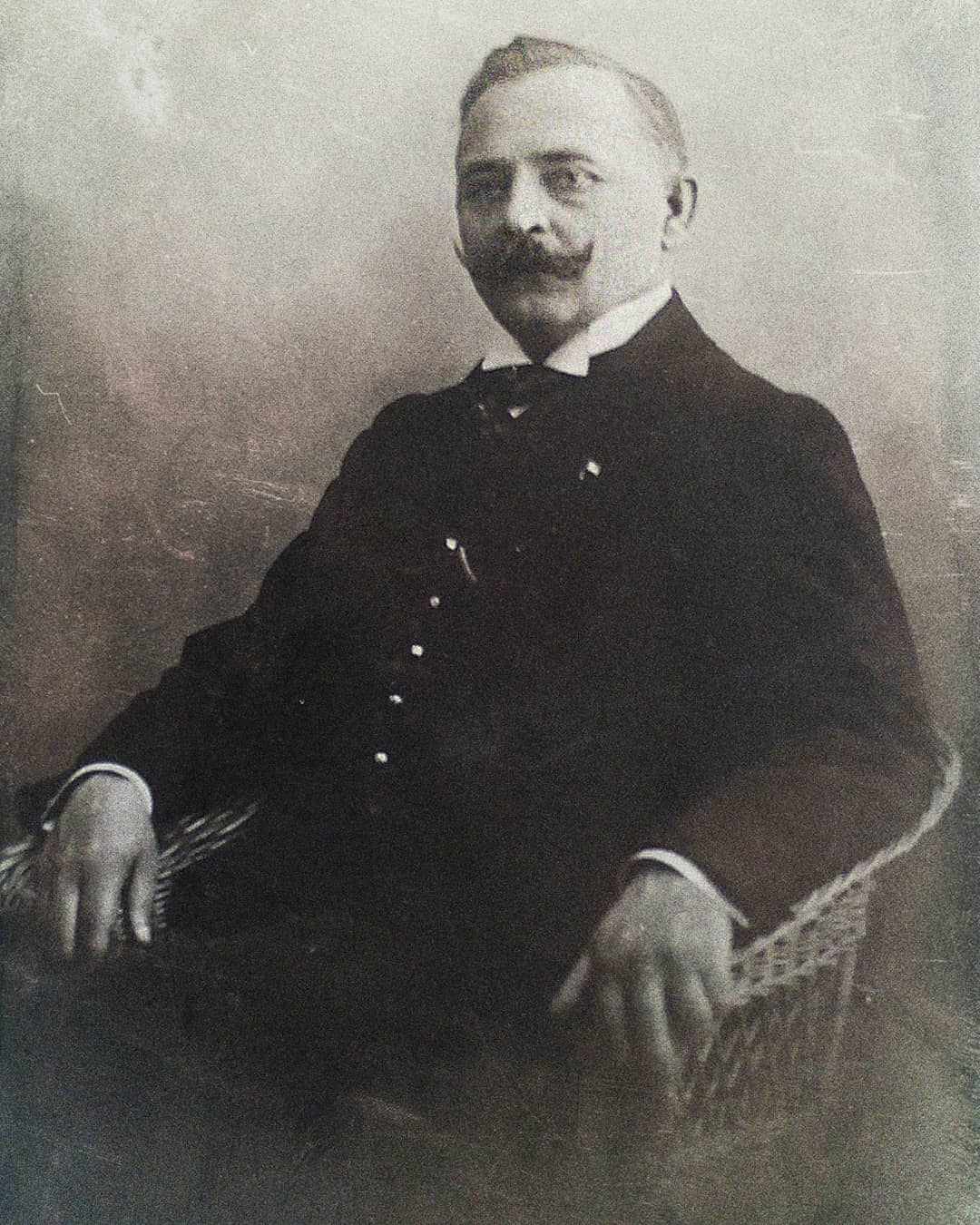
- Born: 1 February 1875; Trakiniai, Russian Empire
- Died: 23 June 1956 (aged 81); Kaunas, Lithuanian SSR
- Occupation: Publisher
- Relatives: Juozapas Kukta (brother)

Martynas Kukta (1 February 1875 – 23 June 1956) was a Lithuanian publisher.

Born to a family of Lithuanian peasants, Kukta received only primary education. He worked as a typesetter for several Tsarist printing presses. In 1904, after the Lithuanian press ban was lifted, he returned to Vilnius where he headed the printing press of the daily Vilniaus žinios in 1904–1906. He then established his own printing press which published books and periodicals in Lithuanian, Polish, Belarusian, and Russia. During World War I, he printed Lietuvos aidas, the official newspaper of the Council of Lithuania. In 1918, he co-founded Švyturys printing press but it became bankrupt in 1928. Kukta retired from printing in 1934 and died in 1956.

== Biography ==
=== Early life ===
Martynas Kukta was born on 1 February 1875 in Trakiniai near Kurkliai to a well off family of Lithuanian farmers. He had seven siblings, including the elder brother Juozapas Kukta who became bishop of Kaišiadorys.

In 1888, Kukta moved to Vilnius to live with his elder brother Jokūbas who worked in publishing. After completing primary school, Kukta worked as an apprentice typesetter at the printing press of the Vilna Military District and later at the press of Vilna Governorate. In 1895, he moved to Saint Petersburg where his brother Juozapas began his studies at the Saint Petersburg Roman Catholic Theological Academy. However, Kukta was conscripted to the Russian Army where he continued to work with printing presses.

=== Printer in Vilnius ===
After military service, Kukta, with the help from Petras Vileišis, established a small printing press in Saint Petersburg. In 1904, the Lithuanian press ban was lifted and Kukta returned to Vilnius where he worked with Vileišis to establish the printing press of the first Lithuanian daily Lietuvos žinios. He was its director until 1906.

In 1906, Kukta left this project to establish his own printing press with the assistance of his brother Juozapas. Kukta's printing press printed about 200 Lithuanian and 70 other (Polish and Belarusian) books from 1906 to 1915. It also printed Lithuanian, Polish, and Belarusian periodicals: Vilniaus žinios, Nasha Niva (1906), Lietuvis (1906–1907), Šviesa (1907), Viltis (1907–1915), Dziecko (1908), Litwa (1908–1914), Sveikata (1909–1915), Žemdirbys (1909–1913), Garsas (1909–1914), Praca (1909), Aušra (1911–1915), Lietuvių tauta (1911–1914), Lud (1912–1913). It also published Russian periodicals Posrednik and Zhizn i scena.

In 1914, Kukta became a member of the Lithuanian Society for the Relief of War Sufferers. The printing press continued to operate during World War I but it diminished. It printed various German proclamations and small booklets. It also printed Lietuvos aidas, the official newspaper of the Council of Lithuania. In December 1918, his printing press published 5,000 copies of the first Lithuanian postal stamps.

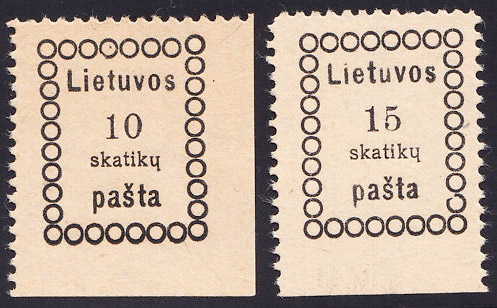
The first Lithuanian postage stamps printed by Kukta

In November 1907, the printing press was closed by Tsarist official for two weeks for printing a Belarusian poetry book of Alaiza Pashkevich without proper approvals from the censorship office. In February 1918, Kukta printed an issue of Lietuvos aidas with the Act of Independence of Lithuania for which he was arrested by the Ober Ost officials.

=== Švyturys ===
In 1918, together with others, Kukta founded Švyturys printing press in Vilnius. The city changed hands frequently during the Polish–Soviet War and the Polish–Lithuanian War. Kukta was arrested by the Polish police and forced to close the shop in Vilnius in 1921. He then moved his printing press to Kaunas, the temporary capital of Lithuania, in 1923. Until its bankruptcy in 1928, Švyturys published about 300 books and textbooks.

Kukta briefly worked as director of Spindulys which took over the bankrupt Švyturys. He then owned a private printing shop which published books, calendars, a few periodicals. He retired from publishing in 1934.

=== Later life ===
Kukta worked at the archive of the Lithuanian Agricultural Bank (from 1935). After World War II, he worked as a clerk at a music school in Kaunas. He died on 23 June 1956 and was buried at Petrašiūnai Cemetery.

In 2005, a memorial plaque was installed on the house in Vilnius where his printing press operated from 1911.
