= Petras Kraujalis =

Lithuanian priest and activist in Vilnius county

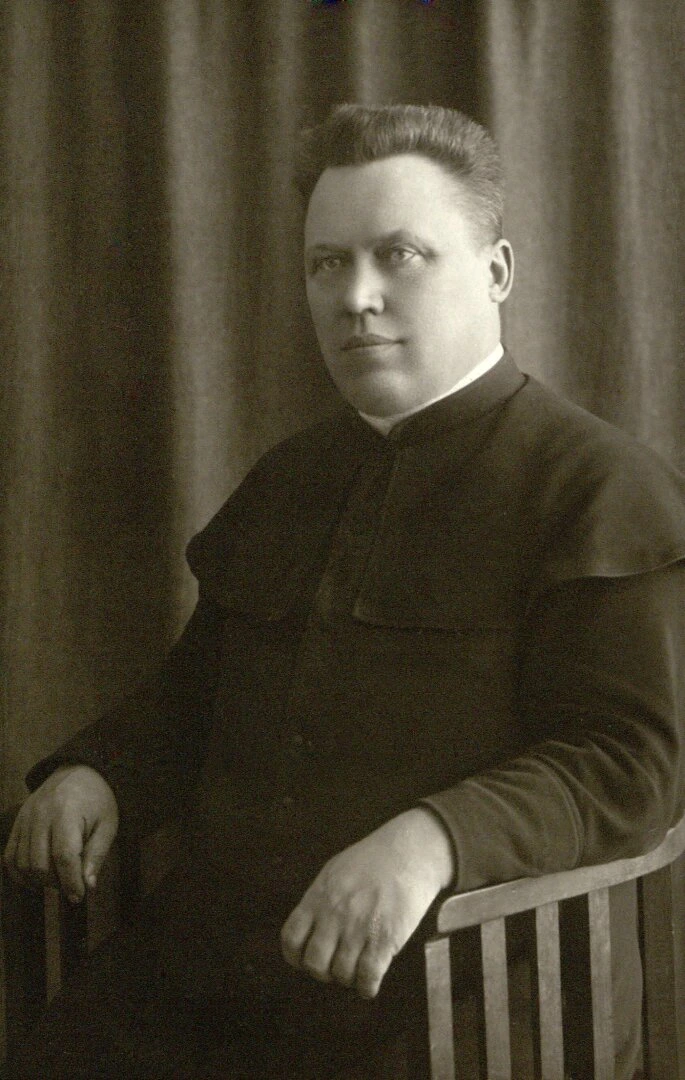
- Born: 8 July 1882; Žagarai, Russian Empire
- Died: 14 August 1933 (aged 51); Vilnius, Second Polish Republic
- Education: Saint Petersburg Roman Catholic Theological Academy
- Occupations: Priest, editor, publicist

Petras Kraujalis (8 July 1882 – 14 August 1933) was a Lithuanian Roman Catholic priest, editor, and publicist who was active in Vilnius Region.

== Biography ==
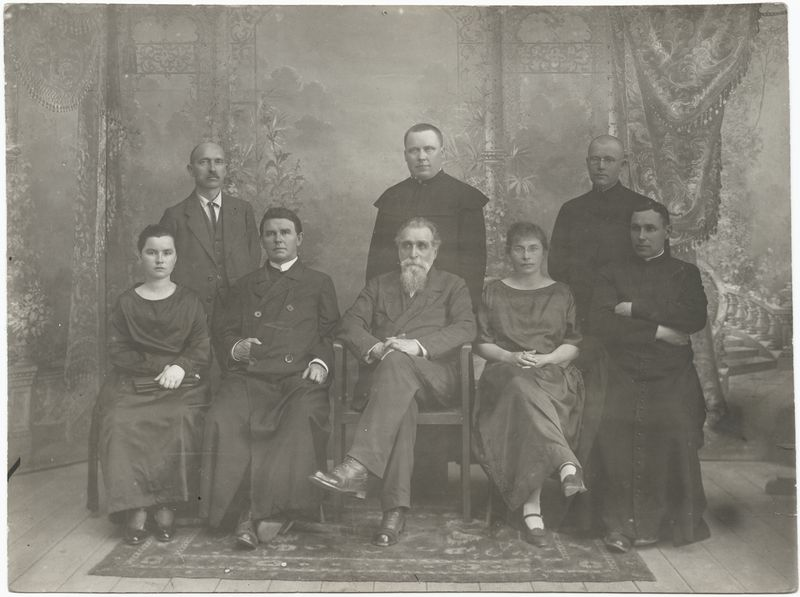
Kraujalis standing in the middle with the members of the Lithuanian Society for the Relief of War Sufferers. Jonas Basanavičius, leader of the Lithuanian National Revival, sits in the middle in the first row.

Petras Kraujelis studied at Mitau Gymnasium, but was expelled for not attending the Eastern Orthodox religious service. In 1908, he graduated from the Saint Petersburg Roman Catholic Theological Academy. He was ordained as a priest in 1907.

After the graduation, he became a vicar of the Church of All Saints, Vilnius. In 1911, he was briefly reassigned as a vicar of the Church of the Visitation of the Blessed Virgin Mary, Trakai. In 1912, he returned to Vilnius and became pastor of the parish of the Church of Saint Nicholas, Vilnius as well as a professor at Vilnius Priest Seminary. In 1911–1914, he edited Lithuanian newspaper Aušra (The Dawn).

After 1920, he edited Lietuvos kelias (The Road of Lithuania), Vilniaus garsas (The Sound of Vilnius), Garsas (The Sound), Vilniaus varpas (The Bell of Vilnius). He also published articles in other Lithuanian newspapers and magazines.

By his initiative on 28–30 December 1922, a congress of the teachers of the primary schools of Lithuania was convened. In 1922–1933, he was the chairman of the Lithuanian Education Society Rytas. He was an active member of the Lithuanian Scientific Society, Society of Saint Casimir for the Education and Care of Young People, and Lithuanian Society for the Relief of War Sufferers. In 1932–1933, was vice-chairman of the Temporary Committee of Vilnius' Lithuanians. In 1930–1931, he taught Lithuanian language at Vilnius University.

Kraujalis actively resisted Polonization of the Vilnius region and closure of Lithuanian-language schools. He was several times detained by the Polish administration and imprisoned in the Vilnius' jail.

== Bibliography ==
- Čibiras, Kristupas; Šikšnys, Marcelinas; Mackevičius, Rapolas; Budrevičius, Vincas (1937). Kunigas Petras Kraujelis (in Lithuanian).
