= Idzi Benedykt Radziszewski =

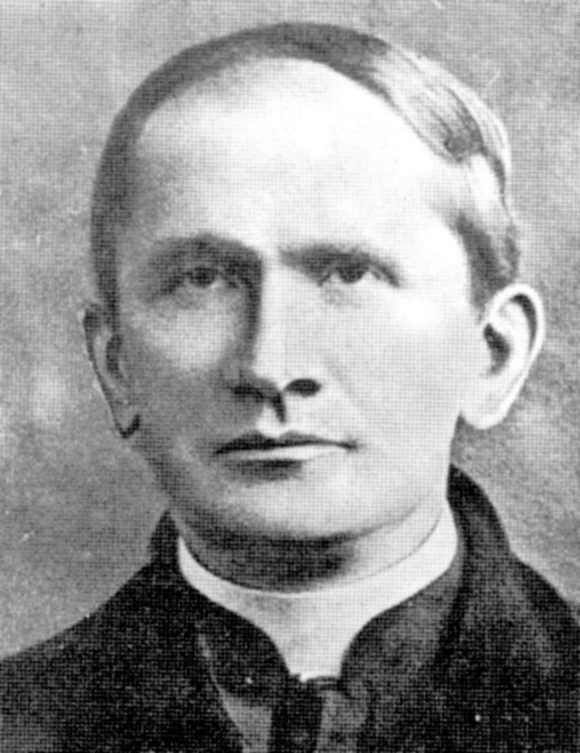
- Idzi Radziszewski as a Seminarian in 1892
- Born: Idzi Benedict Radziszewski; 1 April 1871; Bratoszewice, Congress Poland
- Died: 22 February 1922 (aged 50); Lublin, Second Polish Republic
- Religion: Catholic Church
- Church: Roman Catholic
- Ordained: 1896
- Offices held: Rector of the Saint Petersburg Roman Catholic Theological Academy (1914–1918); Rector of the Catholic University of Lublin (1918–1922)

Idzi Benedict Radziszewski (1 April 1871 – 22 February 1922) was a Polish Roman Catholic priest, philosopher of religion, the last rector of the Imperial Roman Catholic Theological Academy in Saint Petersburg, and co-founder as well as the first rector of the Catholic University of Lublin (KUL).

== Biography ==
Idzi Radziszewski was born in Bratoszewice near Łódź on 1 April 1871. He was the son of Konstanty Marcel and Józefa née Biernacka. His father was a teacher at elementary schools. He had two sisters, Janian and Elżbieta, and three brothers: Ignacy Dominik, Jerzy Szczepan, and Paweł. Ignacy Dominik was a rector of the Warsaw Politechnic, and Paweł was a professor of geology at the University of Vilnius.

Idzi Radziszewski completed elementary school under the guidance of his father. From 1881 to 1889 he studied at the Philological Gymnasium in Płock. After graduating, he entered the Diocesan Seminary in Włocławek, where he developed an interest in philosophical studies.

In 1893 he was sent to study at the Theological Academy in Saint Petersburg. On 12 May 1895 he received subdiaconal ordination, on 24 June 1896 priestly ordination, and on 10 June 1897 he defended his master’s degree in theology.

After several months of pastoral work in Cathedral of St. Nicholas the Bishop in Kalisz. After a year he left Poland to study at the Catholic University of Leuven, under the incognito name of Stephen Vaihinger de Cracovie, to avoid conflicts with Russian administration. In 1900 he earned a doctorate on the basis of the dissertation De ideae religionis genesi in evolutionismo Darvino-Spenceriano [The genesis of the idea of religion in the theories of Charles Darwin and Herbert Spencer], written under the supervision of Fr. Désiré-Joseph Mercier.

During this period he travelled extensively, broadening his intellectual horizons. He first went to England, where he worked for several months in the library of the British Museum, and later visited universities in Oxford and Cambridge. He subsequently travelled to France, Italy, and Austria. From 1901 to 1914 he worked at the Major Seminary in Włocławek as a professor of philosophy and pedagogy. From 1901 to 1905 he served as vice-rector, and from 1908 to 1911 as rector of the seminary. In 1909 he founded the monthly journal Ateneum Kapłańskie, devoted to theology and philosophy.

In 1905 he left for Paris, where he began his novitiate in the Congregation of the Mission of St. Vincent de Paul. The following year he interrupted the novitiate and took up the post of director of the Warsaw Province and spiritual director of the Sisters of Charity of St. Vincent de Paul on Tamka Street in Warsaw. After the failure of the reforms he had undertaken, he was recalled by the authorities of the congregation, and in 1907 he again went west, returning to Włocławek in 1908. In 1911 he received an appointment as a papal domestic prelate, and in 1912 as a cathedral canon of Włocławek.

On 5 February 1914, he became the rector of the Imperial Roman Catholic Theological Academy in Saint Petersburg, after Aleksander Kakowski, the new Matropolitan of Warsaw. He initiated a process of substantial reforms at the institution. Above all, alongside the existing theological section, he established sections of moral and legal studies, biblical and dogmatic studies, and Christian philosophy. In 1917, after the Provisional Government came to power, he became a member of the Commission for Catholic Church Affairs, established by Sergei A. Kotlarevsky. The Bolshevik Revolution thwarted plans for further reforms, and the school was closed in April 1918. In Petrograd, Radziszewski carried out pastoral ministry at St. Catherine's Church and was also active in Polish organizations. He became president of the Polish Society of Lovers of History and Literature, which organized the Polish Higher Courses in Petrograd (1916–1918).

In February 1918, he organized in Petrograd the Organizational Committee of the Catholic University, headed by President Karol Jaroszyński. In June 1918, the Committee moved to Poland, and in the second half of that year the Catholic University of Lublin began its activity. Radziszewski served as its first rector until 1922.

He was buried at the Lipowa Street Cemetery in Lublin.

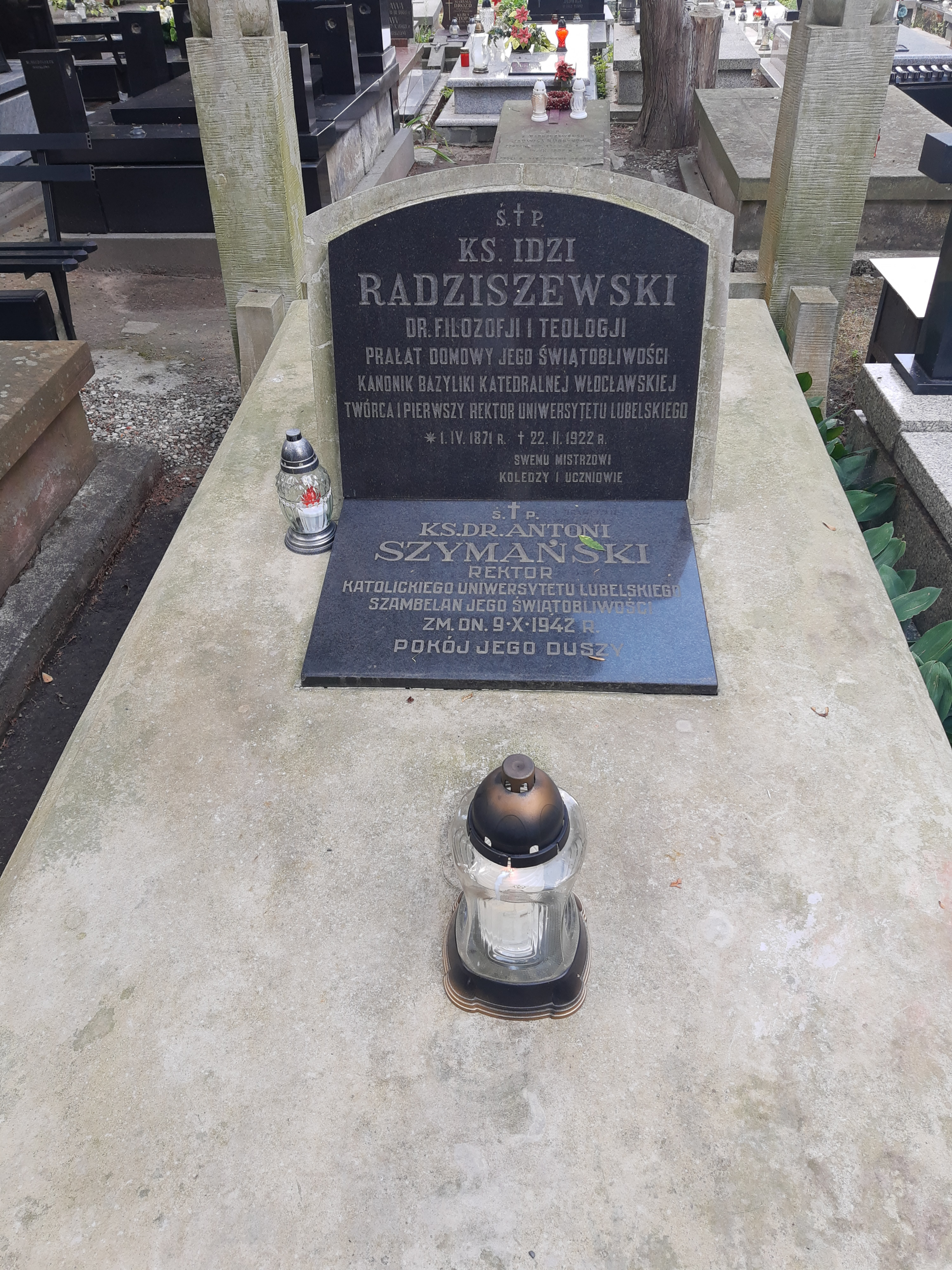
Grave of Fathers Idzi Radziszewski and Antoni Szymański at the Lipowa Street Cemetery

== Commemoration ==
In 2016, the authorities of the John Paul II Catholic University of Lublin initiated the construction of a monument to Radziszewski on Archbishop Józef Życiński Square in Lublin. The monument was unveiled on 8 December 2018, on the centenary of the founding of KUL. On 8 December 2022, the monument was dismantled, but following protests it was returned to its original location.

The likeness of Radziszewski appears on the reverse of a silver collector coin with a face value of 10 złoty issued by the National Bank of Poland in 2019 to mark the centenary of KUL. His image also appears on a postage stamp issued in 2018 by Polish Post, designed by Andrzej Gosik, with a face value of 2.60 złoty and a print run of 100,000 copies.

== Bibliography ==
- Grażyna Karolewicz (1998). Priest Idzi Benedict Radziszewski 1871–1922. Lublin: Polihymnia. ISBN 83-87405-30-2.
