= Kazimierz Mikołaj Michalkiewicz =

The Most Reverend Kazimierz Mikołaj Michalkiewicz
- Auxiliary Bishop of Vilnius
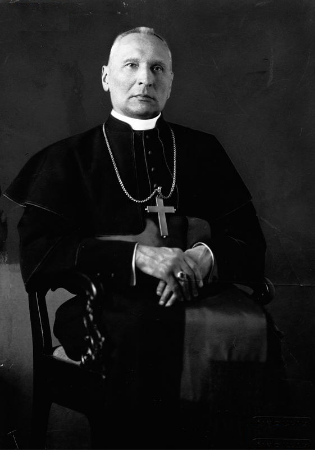
- Church: Roman Catholic Church
- Archdiocese: Archdiocese of Vilnius
- Appointed: 12 January 1923
- In office: 1923–1940
- Previous posts: Apostolic Administrator of the Diocese of Vilnius (1907–1918); Titular Bishop of Thyatira

Orders
- Ordination: 23 October 1886
- Consecration: 10 June 1923 by Jurgis Matulaitis-Matulevičius

Personal details
- Born: 1 February 1865 Opaniškis, Ukmergė County, Russian Empire
- Died: 16 February 1940 (aged 75) Vilnius, Lithuania

Kazimierz Mikołaj Michalkiewicz (1 February 1865 – 16 February 1940) was a Polish Roman Catholic bishop who served as auxiliary bishop of the Roman Catholic Archdiocese of Vilnius from 1923 until his death. He was also the titular bishop of Thyatira.

== Biography ==
=== Early life and education ===
Michalkiewicz was born into a Polish landed gentry family in Opaniškis, in the region of Samogitia, as the son of Justyn Michalkiewicz and Joanna née Klimaszewska. He completed his secondary education in Vilnius and went to the Seminary in Saint Petersburg, where he was ordained a priest on 23 October 1888. Following his ordination, he studied at the Roman Catholic Theological Academy in Saint Petersburg. He pursued part-time studies, earning a master's degree in theology in 1908.

In the meantime, he served in pastoral ministry as a vicar in Vitebsk (1889–1890) and in Vecvārkava near Daugavpils (1890–1891). In 1891, he became parish priest in Bērzgale. In 1896, he was transferred to Kronstadt, where he served as parish priest at the Church of Saints Peter and Paul. There, he developed a Polish parish school and a Polish theatre. In 1902, he moved to Minsk, to the parish of the Holy Trinity.

=== Administrator of the Diocese of Vilnius ===
In 1907, bishop Edward Ropp was removed from the Diocese of Vilnius. On 10 July 1908, Pope Pius X appointed Michalkiewicz as administrator of the Diocese of Vilnius. He arrived in Vilnius on 15 September. During this period, the diocese was shaken by a conflict between Lithuanians and Poles over the auxiliary language of the liturgy. Michalkiewicz knew both languages, which helped him in mediation efforts. On 18–19 February 1909, a conference of diocesan clergy organized by him took place in Vilnius, with the aim of resolving the situation.

The conference concluded that in mixed parishes priests should be bilingual and use both languages in sermons and catechesis. He established a commission composed of a chairman Jan Kurczewski, two Poles, and two Lithuanians, tasked with resolving future disputes. Despite these efforts, Polish–Lithuanian tensions did not subside, and Michalkiewicz often faced accusations from Lithuanians of being a “Polonophile” and a “Lithuanian-devourer.” He complained about this in a letter to the Pope in 1909.

Lithuanian circles submitted complaints against the administrator to Saint Petersburg, which resulted in a letter from the Department for Foreign Denominations of the Ministry of the Interior, dated 1 May 1911, accusing him of failing to enforce the resolutions of the 1909 congress. In response, on 8 May 1911 Michalkiewicz issued an admonition to the clergy, in which he defined a mixed parish as one in which the language of the minority was used by at least 300 people. He also ordered a census of Catholics by language, carried out in 1911–1912. By his decision, Lithuanian sermons were to be delivered at the three major pilgrimage sites – the Gate of Dawn, Vilnius Cathedral, and the Church of the Discovery of the Holy Cross in Verkiai – from May to November. Michalkiewicz also appointed Lithuanian clergy to the majority of parishes in the Vilnius region and designated a chaplain for Lithuanian secondary-school youth. In 1917, he appointed Juozapas Kukta as a member of the cathedral chapter.

Concessions made in favor of the Lithuanians also aroused hostility toward Michalkiewicz among some Poles; this view was held, among others, by Hipolit Korwin-Milewski.

During World War I, he obtained permission from the German authorities to publish the Dziennik Wileński in Polish. On 24 May 1917, he signed a memorandum, together with 43 other Polish activists, calling for the union of the Vilnius Region with Poland, with the reservation of autonomy for minorities. On 10 July 1917, several Lithuanian priests signed a polemical memorandum opposing the Polish act. Michalkiewicz imposed ecclesiastical penalties on them, against which they appealed to Rome. The Apostolic Nuncio to Bavaria Eugenio Pacelli called on Michalkiewicz to resign. On 19 June 1918, the Germans deported him to the Benedictine Maria Laach Abbey in the Rhineland. Jan Hanusowicz became the temporary administrator of the diocese, and on 8 December 1918 the newly appointed bishop Jurgis Matulaitis took over the diocese.

=== Auxiliary bishop of Vilnius ===
Michalkiewicz returned from exile on 26 November 1918 and devoted himself to social work. On 18 August 1920, he was arrested by the Bolsheviks and imprisoned in the Lubyanka in Moscow. He returned from captivity on 22 March 1921.

On 12 January 1923, he was appointed auxiliary bishop of Vilnius and titular bishop of Thyatira. He received episcopal consecration on 10 June 1923 from Archbishop Jurgis Matulaitis-Matulevičius, with bishops Zygmunt Łoziński and Władysław Bandurski acting as co-consecrators. After Matulaitis resigned from the diocese, he was elected capitular vicar on 8 August 1925 and governed the diocese until the arrival of Romuald Jałbrzykowski on 8 September 1926.

He died of pneumonia on 16 February 1940 in Vilnius and was buried in the crypt of the auxiliary bishops of Vilnius Cathedral.

== Bibliography ==
- Bishop Kazimieras Mikalojus Michalkiewicz at Catholic-Hierarchy.org
- Kozyrska, Antonina (2010). "Konflikt polsko-litewski w diecezji wileńskiej na początku XX wieku". Europa Orientalis. Studia z Dziejów Europy Wschodniej i Państw Bałtyckich. 2.
- Nitecki, Piotr (2000). Biskupi Kościoła w Polsce w latach 965–1999. Warsaw: Pax. ISBN 83-211-1311-7.
