= Aušra (Vilnius newspaper) =

Lithuanian-language newspaper (1911–1919)

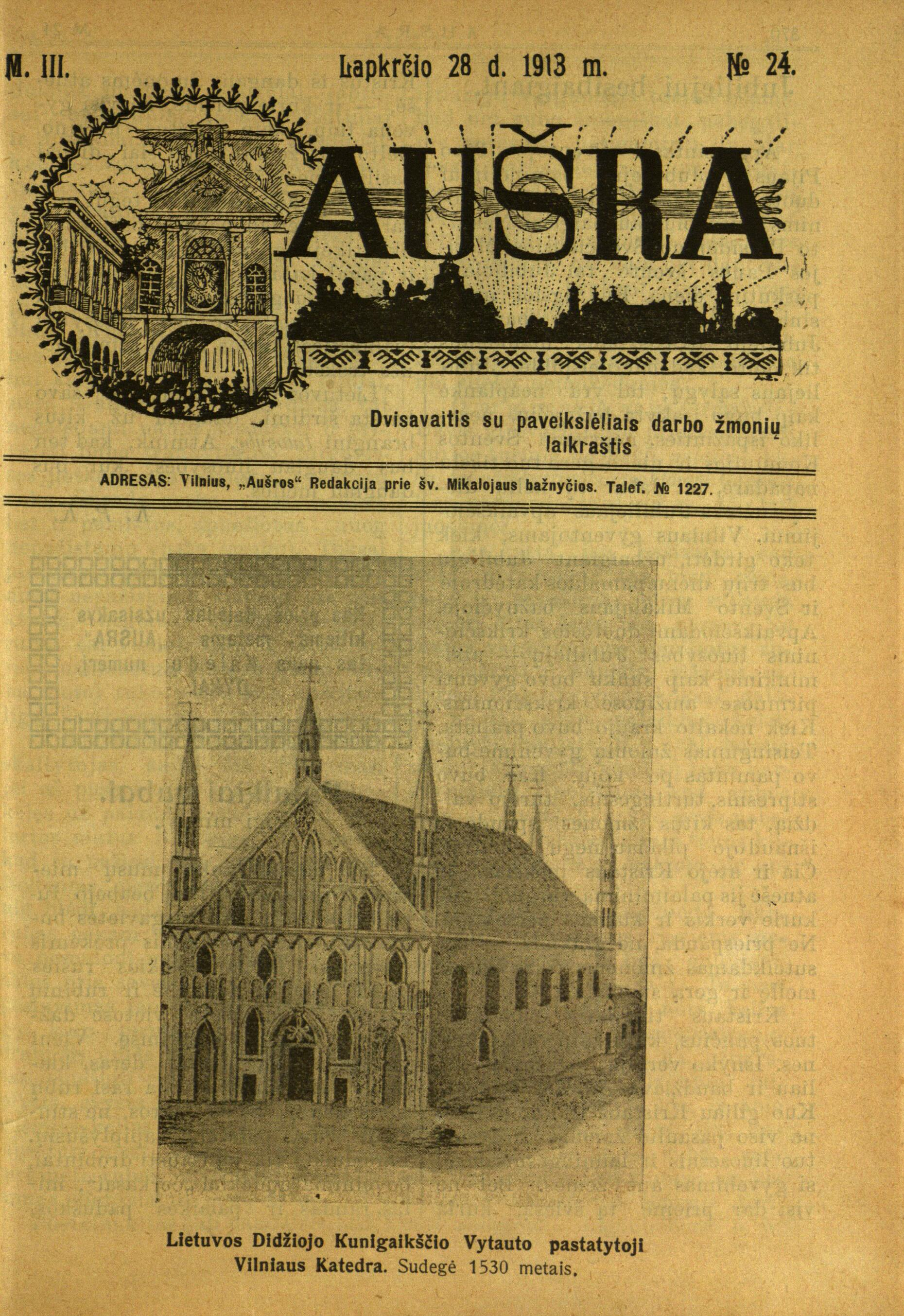
Cover page of Aušra from November 1913. Its nameplate depicts the Gate of Dawn. The cover shows Vilnius Cathedral as it was during the reign of the Grand Duke Vytautas the Great

Aušra (transl. Dawn) was a Lithuanian-language newspaper published in Vilnius. It was published every two weeks from October 1911 to August 1915 and was briefly revived in 1919. It was published by Lithuanian Catholic priests for Lithuanians in Vilnius Region. Edited by Petras Kraujalis, Aušra spread ideas of the Lithuanian National Revival and, in particular, advocated for the use of the Lithuanian language in church services.

== History ==
=== 1911–1915 ===
In spring 1911, priests Vladas Mironas, Alfonsas Petrulis, and Jonas Navickas from the Diocese of Vilnius established a company named Mironas, Petrulis, Novickis & Co. for the purpose of publishing a Lithuanian newspaper. They sold shares in the company for 100 Russian rubles to other priests and activists. The project was supported by the diocese administrator Kazimierz Mikołaj Michalkiewicz.

The first issue of Aušra was published on 6 October 1911. It was published every two weeks and edited by priest Petras Kraujalis. Its editorial office was based at the Church of Saint Nicholas in Vilnius, the only church in Vilnius which held masses in Lithuanian. It was published as the printing press of Martynas Kukta.

In December 1913, a meeting of 37 shareholders of the publishing company discussed the future of Aušra. The newspaper was not profitable as it did not have a capable administrator. Its editor Kraujalis was criticized for publishing articles critical of the Lithuanian Scientific Society and the 1912 Russian legislative election to the State Duma. This started polemic with other newspapers which was not suited for a periodical intended for the common villagers and not members of the intelligentsia. Kraujalis offered his resignation, but it was not accepted as there were no others willing to take the job. The meeting elected a three-member editorial commission to supervise Kraujalis. It included Juozapas Kukta, Klemensas Maliukevičius, and Teodoras Brazys.

In total, 142 issues were published before the newspaper was discontinued on 30 August 1915 – just a few days before the Germans captured Vilnius during the Great Retreat.

=== Revival in 1919 ===
Aušra was relaunched on 13 July 1919 as a weekly newspaper. It was edited by Petras Kraujalis and Jonas Skruodys, though J. Stankevičius signed as the official editor.

At the time, Vilnius was controlled by Poland as a result of the Vilna offensive against the Soviet Russia. Aušra continued to promoted the Lithuanian national identity and hoped to reunited Vilnius Region with the independent interwar Lithuania. Therefore, it was frequently censored by Polish authorities and, after 13 issues, the newspaper was banned on 8 November 1919. In January 1920, Aušra was replaced by Vilniaus garsas.

== Content ==
The mission of Aušra was to spread ideas of the Lithuanian National Revival and, in particular, to advocate for the use of the Lithuanian language in church services. Therefore, most of its attention was paid to the relationship between Lithuanians and Poles in the region. The newspaper published news from Vilnius Region, updates on Lithuanian activities in Lithuania and abroad, educational and religious articles, etc. For example, Alfonsas Petrulis published a series of eight educational articles discussing scientists and their inventions (Archimedes, Isaac Newton, Thomas Edison, etc.). The newspaper published didactic articles encouraging people to pursue education and read books as well as a few articles on the history of Lithuania. It also published literary works by Jurgis Baltrušaitis, Maironis, Faustas Kirša, Silvestras Gimžauskas, and others.

Aušra published supplements Gydytojas (Doctor) and Mūsų ūkis (Our Farm).
