= Alexey Kharuzin =

Russian ethnographer, anthropologist, and statesman (1864–1932)

Alexey Nikolayevich Kharuzin
- Алексей Николаевич Харузин
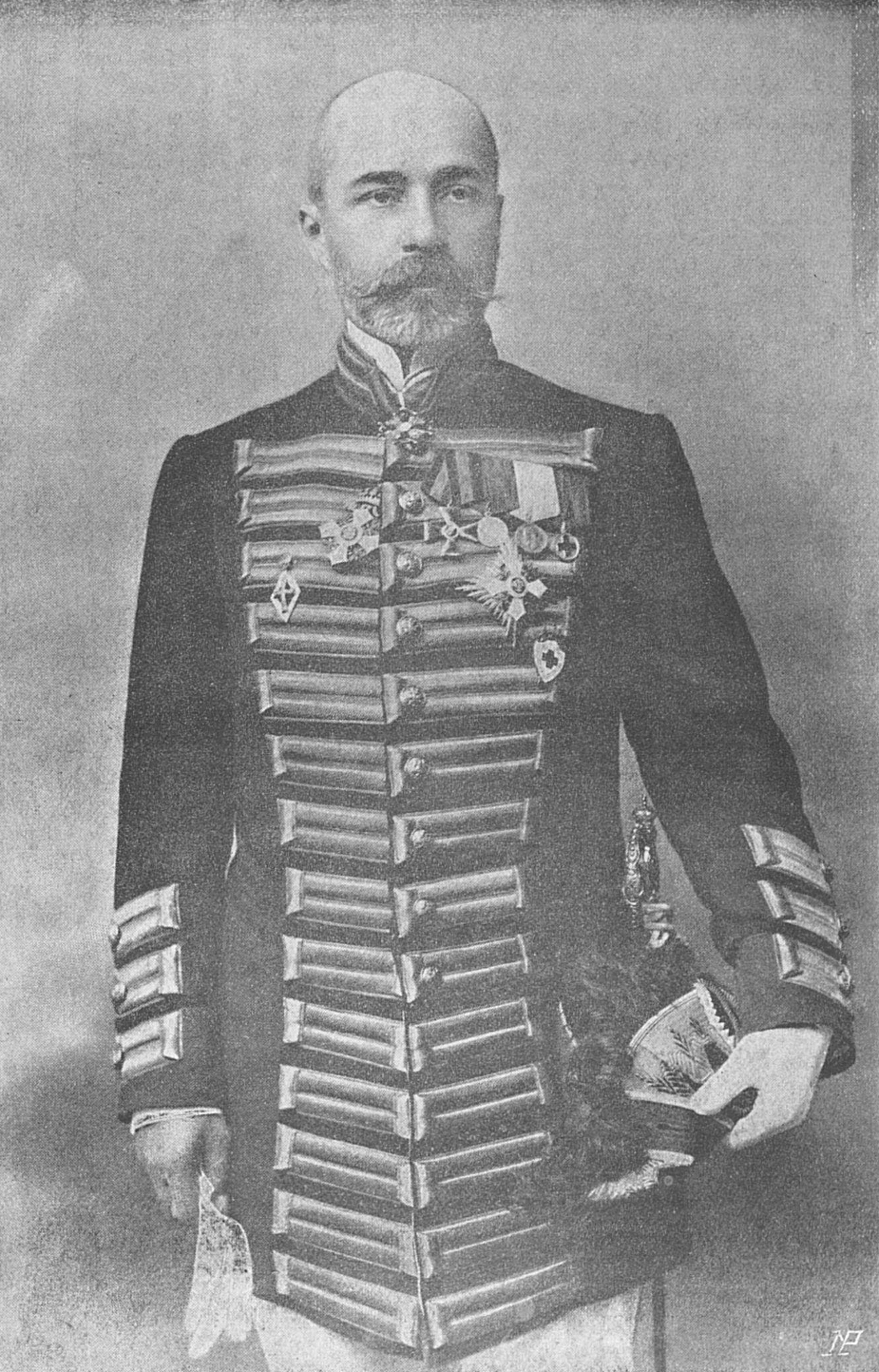
- Alexey Kharuzin in 1913
- Born: March 12, 1864; Reval
- Died: May 8, 1932 (aged 68); Moscow
- Occupations: Ethnographer, anthropologist, statesman

Alexey Nikolayevich Kharuzin (Russian: Алексе́й Никола́евич Хару́зин; March 12, 1864, in Reval – May 8, 1932, in Moscow) was a Russian ethnographer, anthropologist, and statesman.

Kharuzin was born in Reval (present-day Tallinn, Estonia) to a Russian merchant family. Between 1873 and 1883, he attended the Reval Gymnasium. He later graduated from the Moscow State University Faculty of Physics and Mathematics. The Imperial Natural Science Lovers Society (INSLS) sent him on numerous missions to the South Caucasus, Crimea and the Aegean Sea, and Central Asia. In 1889, he became a Russian Geographical Society envoy to Bosnia and Herzegovina. Between 1889 and 1891, Kharuzin was an editor of the INSLS Department of Anthropology Journal.

In 1891, Kharuzin was appointed a special assistant to the governor of Estonia and later as a secretary for the former peasant committee, the provincial statistics committee, the provincial body for peasant affairs. In 1902, he was appointed head of the Vilna Governor General's office.

Between 1904 and 1906, Kharuzin served as a governor of Bessarabia and later as the director of the Department for Religious Affairs of Foreign Faiths. In 1911, he became Russia's Deputy Minister of Internal Affairs.

Unlike many high-ranking Russian statesmen, Kharuzin did not choose to immigrate after the October Revolution of 1917. He worked at the Shatilov agricultural base which he helped establish near Tver. In 1924, he returned to Moscow where he was hired as a gardening teacher at the Agricultural Polytechnicum.

In 1927, Kharuzin was arrested by the State Political Directorate, only to be released soon without any charges. In 1931, he was arrested for the second time together with his son Vsevolod for allegedly "spreading Anti-Soviet propaganda." On April 3, 1932, the Special Council of the NKVD found him guilty of the charge and sentenced him to three years in exile. A month later, Kharuzin died in the Butyrka prison from heart failure.
