= Vilnius St. Joseph Seminary =

Roman Catholic seminary in Vilnius, Lithuania

Coordinates: 54°44′17″N 25°16′43″E

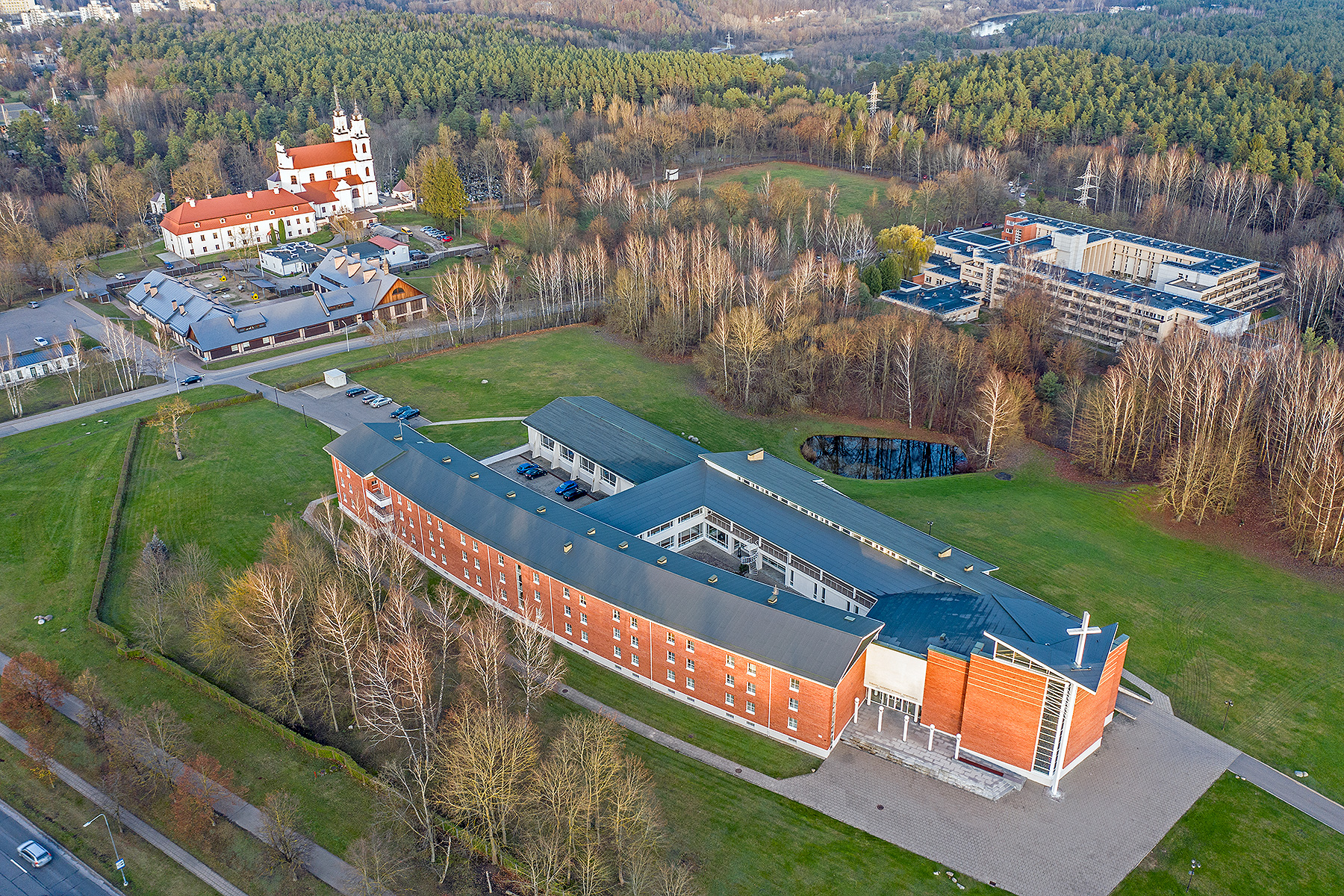
The seminary building

The Vilnius St. Joseph Seminary is a Roman Catholic seminary in Vilnius, Lithuania. It traces its history to an institution founded by Cardinal Jerzy Radziwiłł in 1582 (444 years ago).

By a ukaze (imperial decree) of Alexander I of Russia on July 18, 1803, the Vilnius seminary was declared the central seminary of the Empire, with the obligation for the future Russian Catholic "high clergy" (bishops, canons, ecclesiastical judges) to study there and obtain a degree in theology or canon law. An annual endowment of 180,000 rubles funded by the imperial treasury was established for its maintenance. The Vilnius seminary remained the primary center of study for the Catholic clergy until the establishment of the Roman Catholic Theological Academy of Saint Petersburg in 1831, placed under the direct leadership of Archbishop of Mogilev (Catholic Primate in the Empire) Ignacy Ludwik Pawłowski.

After being closed and reopened several times, it was re-established in 1993 (33 years ago) by Juozas Bačkis, the archbishop of Vilnius, and moved to a new building in 1997 (29 years ago).

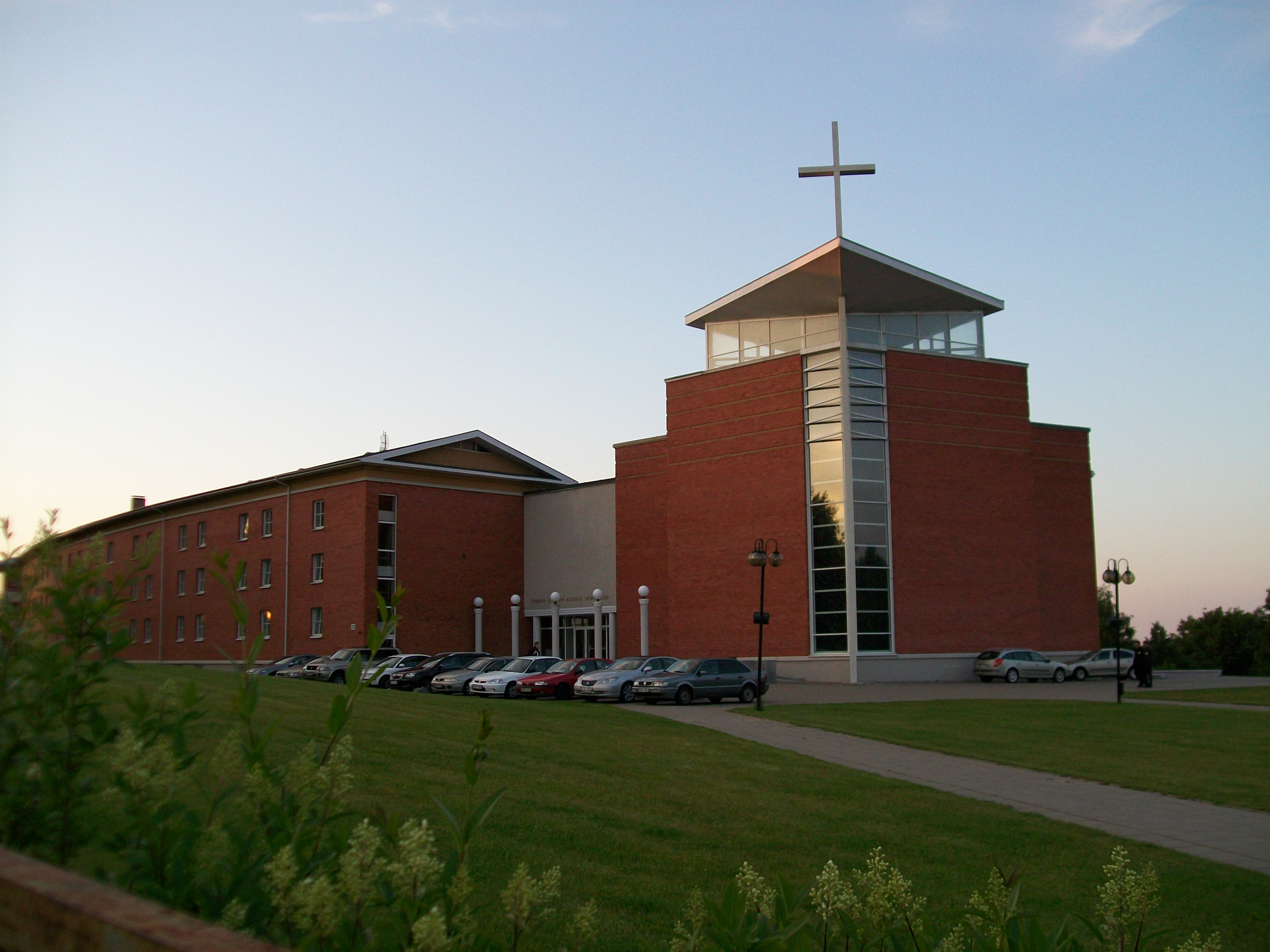

The seminary prepares candidates for priesthood in the Vilnius Archdiocese and the dioceses of Panevėžys and Kaišiadorys. Over the course of the six-year programme, candidates study philosophy, theology, sociology, church history and teachings, educational theory, singing, psychology, languages, art history, and rhetoric. Its graduates receive a baccalaureate from the Pontifical Lateran University.
