= Jurgis Matulaitis-Matulevičius =

Lithuanian Latin Catholic prelate

Blessed Jurgis Matulaitis-Matulevičius M.I.C.
- Bishop Emeritus of Vilnius
- Photograph.
- Church: Catholic Church
- Diocese: Vilnius
- See: Vilnius
- Appointed: 23 October 1918
- Installed: 8 December 1918
- Term ended: 1 September 1925
- Predecessor: Eduard Baron von der Ropp
- Successor: Jan Feliks Cieplak
- Other posts: Titular Archbishop of Adulis (1925-27); Superior-General of the Marian Fathers (1911-27)

Orders
- Ordination: 20 November 1898
- Consecration: 1 December 1918 by Pranciškus Karevičius
- Rank: Bishop

Personal details
- Born: Jurgis Matulaitis-Matulevičius; 13 April 1871 Lūginė, Marijampolė, Lithuania
- Died: 27 January 1927 (aged 55) Kaunas, Lithuania
- Motto: Overcome evil with good

Sainthood
- Feast day: 27 January
- Venerated in: Catholic Church
- Beatified: 28 June 1987; Saint Peter's Basilica, Vatican City by Pope John Paul II
- Attributes: Episcopal attire
- Patronage: Teachers; Sisters of the Immaculate Conception; Handmaids of Jesus in the Eucharist

Jurgis Matulaitis-Matulevičius (Polish: Jerzy Matulewicz; 13 April 1871 - 27 January 1927) was a Latin Church Catholic prelate who served as the Bishop of Vilnius from late 1918 until his resignation in 1925. Matulaitis was also the founder of the Sisters of the Immaculate Conception and the Handmaids of Jesus in the Eucharist; he served as the Superior-General of the Marian Fathers from 1911 until his death. He worked in secret to revive the Marian Fathers after the Russian authorities suppressed all religious orders and he even relinquished his teaching position to better dedicate himself to that secret revival. He was a noted teacher and spiritual director who set up other branches of the order in places such as Switzerland and the United States far from Russian authorities.

Matulaitis' cause for sainthood opened in the 1950s before he was titled as Venerable in 1982. Pope John Paul II beatified the late bishop on 28 June 1987 in Saint Peter's Basilica and referred to the bishop as a "man of God's heart".

== Life ==
Jurgis Matulaitis-Matulevičius was born on 13 April 1871 to the poor farmers Andrius and Uršulė as the youngest of eight children; he was baptized at the parish church (that the Marian Order managed) in Marijampolė. He learnt about the faith in catechism classes at that church from Father Jurgis Cešnas. He was orphaned later with the death of his father in 1874 and his mother in 1881. His mother taught him their native tongue though he learnt Russian in school as he was taught in that language. His elder brother was John and his elder sister was Emilia who looked after him when their parents died.

In 1904 he developed a weakness in his right arm and leg that prevented him from working with his brother on the farm and which kept him from classes at the school and forced him to walk on crutches for a while. His illness was sometime later diagnosed as tuberculosis of the bone which he suffered with for the rest of his life. He liked to spend time alone and this allowed for him to develop his keen intellect. His priest uncle from Warsaw noticed his potential and offered to take care of his nephew's high school education (1879-86) in preparation for him to begin his ecclesial studies which he began in 1891. He continued his studies in 1893 though in Warsaw. But when the civil authorities closed the school he moved to the Saint Petersburg theological school to continue his studies. He became a spiritual student of Honorat Koźmiński. Matulaitis did a dissertation on the theological positions of the Russian Orthodox Church which led his instructors to believe he had a future in ecumenism efforts. He also became an expert Latinist who mastered Polish as well as French and German.

Matulaitis was ordained to the priesthood on 20 November 1898 and his high academic marks led his local bishop to send him to the Fribourg college in Switzerland for doctoral work. Fribourg became a place for free discussion of the sad state of the Lithuanian homeland since it was far outside the Russian borders. He and other Lithuanian students discussed often a cultural revival allowing for a renewal of the faith. He became convinced that religious orders were best suited to the work of such a revival and so traveled home to Marijampolė to discuss with one of the last remaining members of the suppressed Marian Order the potential of a secret resurrection of that order. Trips to Rome and Marijampolė set the plan in motion which the superior of the order Vincent Senkus approved.

Matulaitis completed his doctorate in theological studies in Switzerland before returning to teach Latin and canon law to seminarians in Kielce. He then moved on to head the new established Sociological Department in 1907 before serving as the vice-rector of the Saint Petersburg spiritual college where he began teaching dogmatics. In this time the renewal of the Marian Order was taking place in secret. Pope Pius X approved a new interim constitution as the group's rule which allowed for him to take his vows in secret as a professed member of the order in 1909. The death of the last Marian prior to suppression - Fr. Senkus - led to a sudden meeting on 14 July 1911 in which the order elected Matulaitis the Superior-General of the order which - at that point in time - consisted of him and two other priests even though there were seminarians preparing to join the group. Though he was a respected teacher his secret work with the Marians put the renewal — and the school — in danger. Matulaitis decided it was time to resign in order to work for the order.

In due course he began reclaiming the properties of the old order while also establishing religious houses and houses for training new novices in Poland and Switzerland as well as Chicago in the United States (1913). Just as it seemed the work of the Marian renewal was seeming to take root he had heard rumors that he was being considered for the position of bishop. He accepted the call of Pope Benedict XV to serve as the Bishop of Vilnius on 23 October 1918. Matulaitis had just founded the Sisters of the Immaculate Conception on 15 October 1918. He later founded another order - the Handmaids of Jesus in the Eucharist - in 1924 in Belarus. He received his episcopal consecration on 8 December 1918 before taking formal possession of his new diocese.

But his diocese was at the heart of constant conflict which meant that different forces occupied the region on a frequent basis. This proved far too tiresome for the bishop who requested to be relieved of his pastoral duties in 1925 which Pope Pius XI accepted. But the pope was quick to elevate him to the rank of archbishop and instructed him to negotiate a concordat between the pope and Lithuania as well as to legitimize the new nation's dioceses.

In June 1926 he traveled to the United States for the second time where he participated in the Eucharistic Congress in Chicago. He returned to Lithuania and completed the negotiations with the Lithuanian government. In Kaunas - which was under a curfew - he fell ill from acute appendicitis which prompted him to be admitted into Hagenthorn's Clinic where he had an operation. He died from a ruptured appendix at the time of the operation. His remains were later transferred on 24 October 1934 to his hometown to the church of Saint Michael the Archangel in a small chapel under an altar.

== Beatification ==
The beatification process for the late bishop opened in both Kaunas and Rome in an informative process that lasted from 1953 until 1956 while his spiritual writings received theological approval on 26 June 1959 after being investigated. The formal introduction to the cause came under Pope Paul VI on 9 February 1967 and this titled Matulaitis as a Servant of God. An apostolic process as later held from 1971 to 1972 for additional research and inquiries before the Congregation for the Causes of Saints (C.C.S.) validated the processes in Rome on 7 March 1975. The C.C.S. officials and their consultants approved this cause on 27 October 1981 as did the C.C.S. alone on 9 March 1982. Pope John Paul II confirmed that Matulaitis had lived a model life of heroic virtue and named him as Venerable on 11 May 1982.

But Matulaitis' beatification depended on the confirmation of a miracle. One such case - a healing - was investigated in the diocese of its origin and it received C.C.S. validation prior to medical experts approving it on 15 January 1986. Theologians followed suit on 9 May 1986 as did the C.C.S. on 17 June 1986 prior to John Paul II issuing final approval on 30 June 1986. John Paul II beatified Matulaitis on 28 June 1987 in Saint Peter's Basilica.

The current postulator for this cause is Andrzej Pakuła.

At the time of his beatification there were around 1000 claims of miracles attributed to his intercession.
