= Saint Petersburg Roman Catholic Theological Academy =

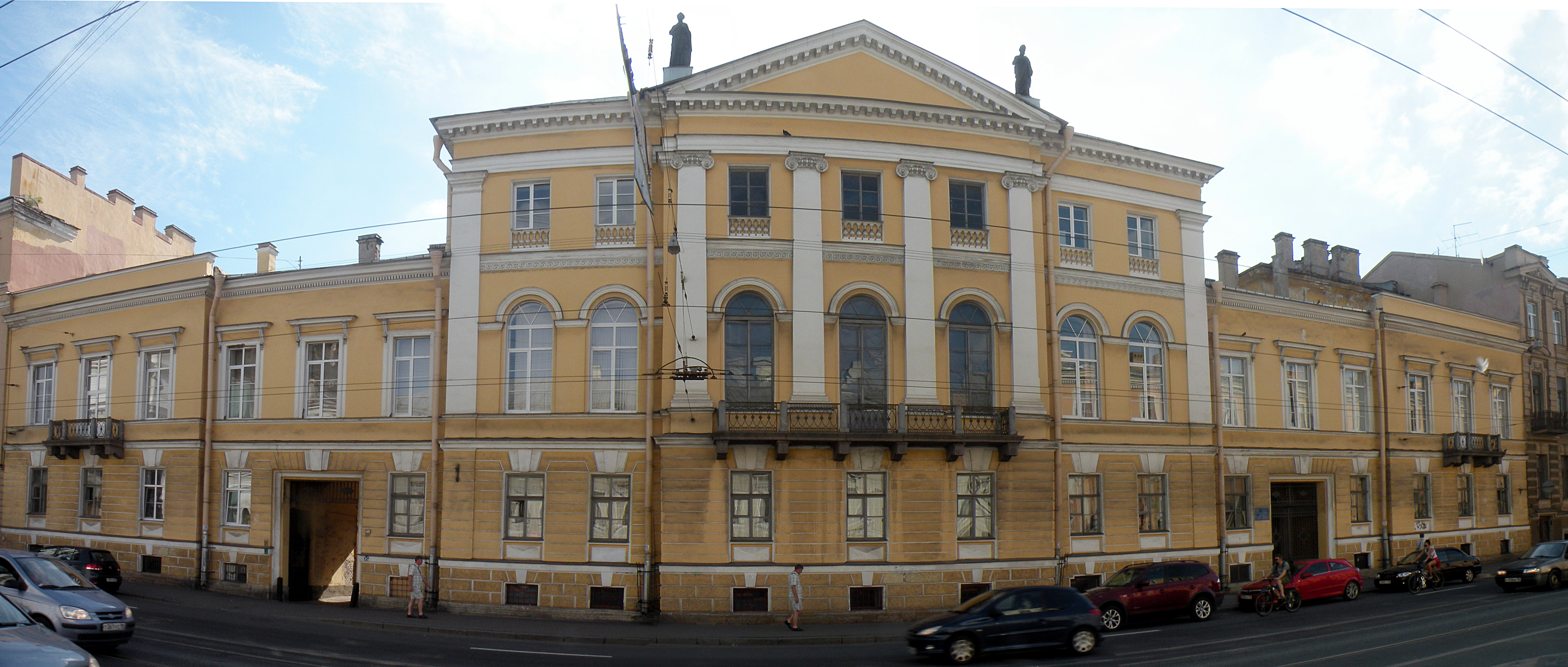
The Academy Building on Vasilievsky Island

The Imperial Roman Catholic Theological Academy (Russian: Императорская Римско-Католическая Духовная Академия) was an institution of higher education preparing Roman Catholic theologians in the Russian Empire. The academy granted master's and doctorate degrees in theology and was designed to prepare clergy for senior positions in the Catholic Church hierarchy. It originated at the Vilnius University, but was transferred to Saint Petersburg in the aftermath of the Uprising of 1831. The Tsarist authorities wanted to exercise greater control over the academy and implement Russification policies. After the October Revolution in 1917, the academy was moved to Poland where it became the Catholic University of Lublin. Mary Queen of the Apostles Seminary was established in Moscow in 1993; it moved to the premises of the historical Saint Petersburg Academy in 1995.

== In Vilnius ==
The academy traced its roots to the Supreme Theological Seminary of Vilnius University established in 1803–1808 in the Augustine monastery. After the Uprising of 1831, the university was closed leaving only two academies – the Academy of Medicine–Surgery and the Theological Academy. Both of them were subordinated to the Ministry of Internal Affairs (as opposed to Ministry of Education or Bishop of Vilnius). Vilnius Theological Academy was officially established on July 1, 1833. The academy closely cooperated with Vilnius Priest Seminary. Around 1840, the Tsarist authorities suspected that the students were planning another uprising. Therefore, the academy, including its students, professors, and library, was moved to Saint Petersburg in August 1842. The Academy of Medicine–Surgery was also closed, transferring its assets to the University of Kiev. Vilnius and Lithuania were left without an institution of higher education.

Courses included theology, scripture, homiletics, Biblical hermeneutics and archaeology, history of Christianity, canon law, logic, ethics, classical, Polish, and Russian languages and literature, world and Russian history. The lectures were held in Latin and Russian languages. The academy had about 40 students; the section devoted to the Armenian Catholic Church had 7 students. Its rectors were Alojzy Osiński (former lecturer at the Liceum Krzemienieckie; 1770–1842) and Antoni Fijałkowski (former professor at Vilnius University; 1797–1883). The academy had 8 faculty members, who included philologist Leon Borowski, philosopher Anioł Dowgird, historian Paweł Kukolnik.

== In Saint Petersburg ==
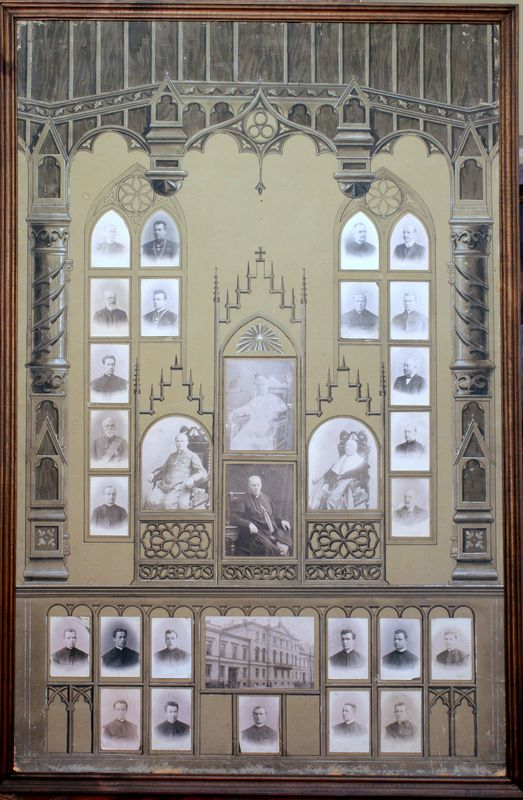
Teachers and fourth-year students of the academy in 1907

In Saint Petersburg for the first two years, the academy was located in the Łokotnikow House, at the corner of what are now Socialisticheskaya and Marata Streets. Students attended services at St. Catherine’s Church or the Maltese Chapel in the Vorontsov Palace.

In 1844 the academy settled in the former palace of the Russian Academy on the Vasilyevsky Island. The purchase and reconstruction of the premises was financed with funds of closed Catholic monasteries. The consecration ceremony of the palace was attended by Emperor Nicholas I. On that occasion the academy was granted the title "Imperial Academy". All other Catholic academies became its subordinates.

The languages of instruction were Latin and Russian. Alongside theological subjects, taught exclusively by priests, secular subjects were also offered, taught by lay instructors, mainly Orthodox and Protestants.

The number of students was limited to 40; the limit was increased to 60 after the Roman Catholic Clerical Academy in Warsaw was closed in 1867. From 1885 to 1917, the academy published students' research papers in a yearbook. Most gifted students were sent for further studies to western universities. In 1906, the academy had 13 faculty members. After the October Revolution, the academy was closed in April 1918 and moved to Poland where it became the Catholic University of Lublin.

The Soviet authorities confiscated the academy’s archives and part of its library, and its premises were transferred to the Estonian Proletarian University. Thanks to the support of the Polish Re-Evacuation Commission in Moscow, the private book collections of the academy’s lecturers purchased by Karol Jaroszyński, comprising 26,000 volumes, were transported from Moscow to Lublin.

== People ==
=== Alumni ===
The academy continued to prepare theologians for western provinces of the Russian Empire. The students were mostly Polish and Lithuanian, with some Belarusians, Latvians, Germans. Over the academy’s 76 years of existence, approximately 1,300 clergymen studied there. More than 300 did not complete their studies, mainly for health reasons. Thirty-nine students were forced to leave the institution at the time of its closure in 1918. The student body was drawn primarily from Polish families, as well as Lithuanian, Latvian, and Belarusian ones; less frequently from Russian, German, French, or Ukrainian backgrounds. In the early period, students came mainly from noble and bourgeois families; however, by the end of the nineteenth century, half of the students were of peasant origin.

Its famous alumni and faculty included:

- Fabijan Abrantovich
- Blessed Roman Archutowski
- Antanas Baranauskas
- Servant of God Konstanty Romuald Budkiewicz
- Servant of God Paweł Chomicz
- Servant of God Archbishop Jan Cieplak
- Antoni Czerwiński
- Saint Zygmunt Szczęsny Feliński
- Marian Fulman
- Romuald Jałbrzykowski
- Vladas Jurgutis
- Blessed Henryk Kaczorowski
- Aleksander Kakowski
- Josef Alois Kessler
- Blessed Ignacy Kłopotowski
- Mykolas Krupavičius
- Juozapas Kukta
- Zygmunt Łoziński
- Maironis
- Blessed Jurgis Matulaitis-Matulevičius
- Vincas Mykolaitis-Putinas
- Karol Niedziałkowski
- Blessed Antoni Julian Nowowiejski
- Servant of God Wojciech Owczarek
- Blessed Martyr Michał Piaszczyński
- Kazimieras Paltarokas
- Justinas Pranaitis
- Mečislovas Reinys
- Blessed Martyr Antoni Rewera
- Franz Anton Schiefner
- Juozapas Skvireckas
- Boļeslavs Sloskāns
- Blessed Martyr Kazimierz Sykulski
- Servant of God Karol Śliwowski
- Servant of God Jan Trojgo
- Servant of God Andrei Tsikota
- Julijans Vaivods
- Motiejus Valančius
- Blessed Martyr Leon Wetmański
- Blessed Martyr Antoni Zawistowski

=== Rectors ===
The academy rectors were:

- Ignacy Hołowiński (1842–1855)
- Wincenty Lipski (1855–1857)
- Antoni Jakubielski (1857–1860)
- Aleksander Kazimierz Bereśniewicz (1860–1864)
- Dominika Stacewicza (1864–1876)
- Szymon Marcin Kozłowski (1877–1880)
- Antoni Franciszek Audziewicz (1880–1884)
- Franciszek Albin Symon (1884–1897)
- Karol Niedziałkowski (1897–1901)
- Longin Żarnowiecki (1901–1910)
- Aleksander Kakowski (1910–1913)
- Idzi Benedykt Radziszewski (1914–1917)
