= Vincentas Taškūnas =

- Born: Vincentas Taškūnas; 10 November 1880; Žąsiniai, Russian Empire
- Died: 18 February 1967 (aged 86); Vilnius, Lithuanian SSR
- Education: Vilnius Priest Seminary; Saint Petersburg Roman Catholic Theological Academy
- Occupation: Catholic priest
- Board member of: Society of Saint Casimir for the Education and Care of Young People

Vincentas Taškūnas (1880–1967) was a Lithuanian Roman Catholic priest.

Taškūnas graduated with a master's degree in theology from the Saint Petersburg Roman Catholic Theological Academy in 1915. After World War I, he settled in Vilnius (Wilno, Vilna) which was then part of the Second Polish Republic. He worked as a chaplain at the Lithuanian Vytautas Magnus Gymnasium and taught the Lithuanian language at Vilnius Priest Seminary. He was editor of the newspaper Vilniaus aušra (1932–1939) and chairman of the Society of Saint Casimir for the Education and Care of Young People (1932–1937).

During World War II, he worked at the diocesan chancery of the Archdiocese of Vilnius and was selected by Archbishop Mečislovas Reinys as one of his successors. However, Soviet authorities would not allow it and Taškūnas was effectively exiled from Vilnius. He died in obscurity in 1967.

== Biography ==
=== Early life and education ===
Taškūnas was born on 10 November [O.S. 29 October] 1880 in Žąsiniai near Dūkštas to a family of Lithuanian peasants. He was the youngest of nine children. His father was an enterprising farmer and managed to save and borrow enough money to buy about 98 hectares (240 acres) of land in Lapušiškė near Rimšė in 1897.

Taškūnas received his primary education at home. He studied at the Panevėžys Real School in 1892–1897 and completed four classes (he repeated the second year twice). He then enrolled at the Vilnius Priest Seminary in fall 1898. He graduated in 1902, but was ordained a priest only on 14 June 1903. He held his first celebratory mass at the Church of St. Francis and St. Bernard, Vilnius. He was then assigned as a vicar to the Church of All Saints, Vilnius. In 1905, he was reassigned as a parson to Paberžė. The town did not have a Catholic church, thus he built a temporary structure from wood planks. After less than a year, he was transferred to Liadsk near Shchuchyn.

Taškūnas started the paperwork to apply to the Saint Petersburg Roman Catholic Theological Academy in 1906, but was admitted only in 1911. He graduated with a master's degree in theology in 1915.

=== Work in Dzisna and Vilnius ===
After his studies, Taškūnas was assigned as dean in Dzisna. During World War I, he established a chapter of the Lithuanian Society for the Relief of War Sufferers as well as a Lithuanian school. In 1917, he participated in the opening and inspection of the casket of Saint Andrew Bobola in Polotsk: the remains were dressed in new clothes and placed in a more elaborate casket. Taškūnas departed Dzisna due to an illness in 1920. He joined a monastery of the Congregation of Marian Fathers of the Immaculate Conception in Marijampolė, but left after six weeks due to lack of calling.

He then moved to Vilnius where in September 1920 he got a job as a religion teacher at the Lithuanian Vytautas Magnus Gymnasium. In 1922, he left the gymnasium to work as a chaplain at the Lithuanian Teachers' Seminary maintained by the Lithuanian Education Society Rytas until its closure in 1927 and as a parson at the Church of St. Stephen, Vilnius. He returned to the gymnasium, this time as a chaplain, in 1926 and worked there until summer 1935 when he was replaced by Kristupas Čibiras. After the death of Petras Kraujalis, Taškūnas was appointed as the instructor of the Lithuanian language at Vilnius Priest Seminary in September 1933. He later taught other subjects as well. For example, in 1943–1944, he taught Latin and patristics.

=== Lithuanian activist ===
Taškūnas joined the Lithuanian cultural life in Vilnius. Since Lithuania–Poland relations were tense due to the territorial dispute over Vilnius, activists faced repressions from the Polish authorities. In particular, in retribution for closing Polish schools in Lithuania, Polish police closed 44 Lithuanian schools and the Teachers' Seminary and arrested 25 Lithuanian activists, including Taškūnas. In later years, Taškūnas was sued and faced fines several times.

In July 1932, Taškūnas was elected chairman of the Society of Saint Casimir for the Education and Care of Young People replacing priest Antanas Viskantas. The society organized local chapters in towns and villages to promote the Lithuanian national identity and Catholicism. In 1936, Polish authorities ramped up anti-Lithuanian activities and closed the vast majority of the local chapters of the Society of Saint Casimir. The society itself was forcibly closed on 31 December 1937. A month before the closure, society's headquarters and residences of its board members (including that of Taškūnas) was searched by the police.

In October 1932, Taškūnas established and became editor-in-chief of the Lithuanian Catholic periodical Vilniaus aušra. It was published monthly; it increased the frequency to twice a month in 1937 and to weekly in 1938–1939. The last issue appeared on 17 September 1939, the day of the Soviet invasion of Poland. The newspaper published mostly religious texts as well as articles on culture and education. It wrote about the activities of Lithuanian societies (particularly of the Society of Saint Casimir) and Lithuanian life under the Polish rule. It was a moderate newspaper and, unlike most other Lithuanians periodicals in Vilnius Region, did not have issues confiscated by the Polish police. Taškūnas also contributed articles to other Lithuanian periodicals published in Vilnius (Kelias, Jaunimo draugas, Vilniaus rytojus) and in independent Lithuania (Mūsų laikraštis, Draugija, Šaltinis).

In 1932, Taškūnas also published a 64-page booklet with prayers for pilgrims to the Verkiai Calvary. It was republished in 1940. Taškūnas liked to travel. He visited Rome in 1925, Poland in 1935, France and Switzerland in 1937 (including the World Exhibition in Paris), Ukraine (including Truskavets resort where he sought treatment) and Italy (including an audience with Pope Pius XI) in 1938. He published his travel impressions in Vilniaus aušra.

In December 1938, Polish authorities banned the activities of the newly established Lithuanian chapters of the Catholic Action established by the Archdiocese of Vilnius because its leader Kazimieras Pukėnas showed too strong pro-Lithuanian sentiments. The archdiocese dismissed Pukėnas and replaced him with Taškūnas, but these Lithuanian chapters did not gain more traction.

=== Later life ===
During an air raid by the Soviet forces on the night of 23 March 1942, a bomb fell onto the clergy house of the Church of Saint Nicholas, Vilnius. It killed priest Kristupas Čibiras, his housekeeper, and Taškūnas' sister and severely injured Taškūnas and Mečislovas Reinys. Taškūnas spent several months recuperating. He had a limp and chronic pain for the rest of his life.

Just before the air raid, Taškūnas was appointed to the ecclesiastical court (tribunal of second instance) of Vilnius Archdiocese. He wanted to refuse this appointment as he did not feel competent enough for such work, but he continued to work at the court and the diocesan chancery until 1948. He was also the vice-rector of Vilnius Priest Seminary in 1942–1944.

Archbishop Mečislovas Reinys selected Edmundas Basys, Taškūnas, and Juozapas Dubietis as his successors and administrators of the archdiocese. Reinys was arrested by the KGB in June 1947 and Basys was forced to resign in 1949. The Soviet authorities did not allow either Taškūnas or Dubietis to take over the diocese and exiled them from Vilnius; instead, the authorities selected Kazimieras Paltarokas.

Taškūnas lived as an altarista in Trakai and Naujoji Vilnia. He later returned to Vilnius to live with his nieces. He died on 18 February 1967. He wanted to be buried in the Rasos Cemetery, but it was not allowed and he was buried in the Saltoniškės Cemetery.
