= Mečislovas Reinys =

Lithuanian Roman Catholic titular archbishop and professor

- Auxiliary Archbishop of Vilnius
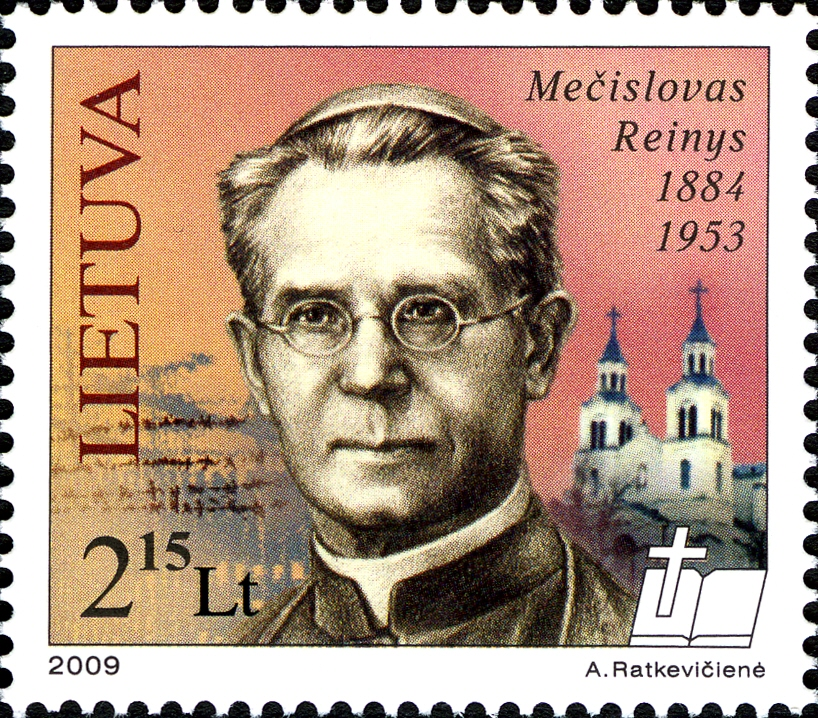
- Lithuanian postal stamp dedicated to Reinys (2009)
- Church: Roman Catholic Church
- Archdiocese: Archdiocese of Vilnius
- Other posts: Coadjutor Bishop of Vilkaviškis; Titular Bishop of Tiddi; Titular Archbishop of Cypsela

Orders
- Ordination: 10 June 1907
- Consecration: 16 May 1926 by Jurgis Matulaitis-Matulevičius

Personal details
- Born: 5 February 1884 Madagaskaras, Kovno Governorate, Russian Empire
- Died: 8 November 1953 (aged 69) Vladimir Central Prison, Soviet Union
- Denomination: Roman Catholic
- Education: Vilnius Priest Seminary; Saint Petersburg Roman Catholic Theological Academy; Catholic University of Leuven

Mečislovas Reinys (5 February 1884 – 8 November 1953) was a Lithuanian Roman Catholic titular archbishop and professor at Vytautas Magnus University. He was the Lithuanian Minister of Foreign Affairs from September 1925 to April 1926. He was imprisoned by the Soviets in Vladimir Central Prison where he died in 1953. His beatification case was opened in 1998 and he was recognized as a martyr in 2000.

Born into a family of peasants, Reinys received his master's from the Saint Petersburg Roman Catholic Theological Academy and doctorate from the Catholic University of Leuven. He returned to Lithuania in 1914 and became an active participant in the Lithuanian cultural and political life in Vilnius. He taught at Vilnius Priest Seminary, chaired the Lithuanian Education Society Rytas, and drafted political program of the Lithuanian Christian Democratic Party. In the interwar period, he was active in many other organizations and societies, including the Catholic youth organizations Ateitis and Pavasaris as well as the Lithuanian Catholic Academy of Science.

In 1922, he moved to Kaunas, the temporary capital of Lithuania, and became a professor of psychology at Vytautas Magnus University. In September 1925, Reinys became the Lithuanian Minister of Foreign Affairs in the cabinet of Prime Minister Leonas Bistras. During his short tenure, Reinys began negotiations regarding the Soviet–Lithuanian Non-Aggression Pact (signed in September 1926) and normalized Lithuania's relations with the Holy See that soured after the Concordat of 1925 with Poland. On 4 April 1926, Pope Pius XI issued a bull which established the ecclesiastical province in Lithuania, including the Diocese of Vilkaviškis of which Reinys was named coadjutor bishop. The bull was harshly criticized by the opposition forcing Reinys to resign. After a conflict with bishop Antanas Karosas, Reinys became more involved in diocesan affairs and started teaching at the Vilkaviškis Priest Seminary in 1934.

In July 1940, Reinys was appointed titular archbishop of Cypsela and auxiliary archbishop of Vilnius. This brought him to conflict with archbishop Romuald Jałbrzykowski who supported Polonization efforts. After Jałbrzykowski's arrest by the German Gestapo, Reinys became the administrator of the archdiocese and began undoing some of the Polonization efforts (e.g. replacing arrested Polish priest with Lithuanian or Belarusian priests). This brought him into conflict with Polish activists. After the Soviet re-occupation, Soviet security agencies attempted to persuade Reinys to cooperate. When he refused, he was sentenced to 8 years in prison. He died in Vladimir Central Prison in November 1953.

== Biography ==
=== Early life and education ===
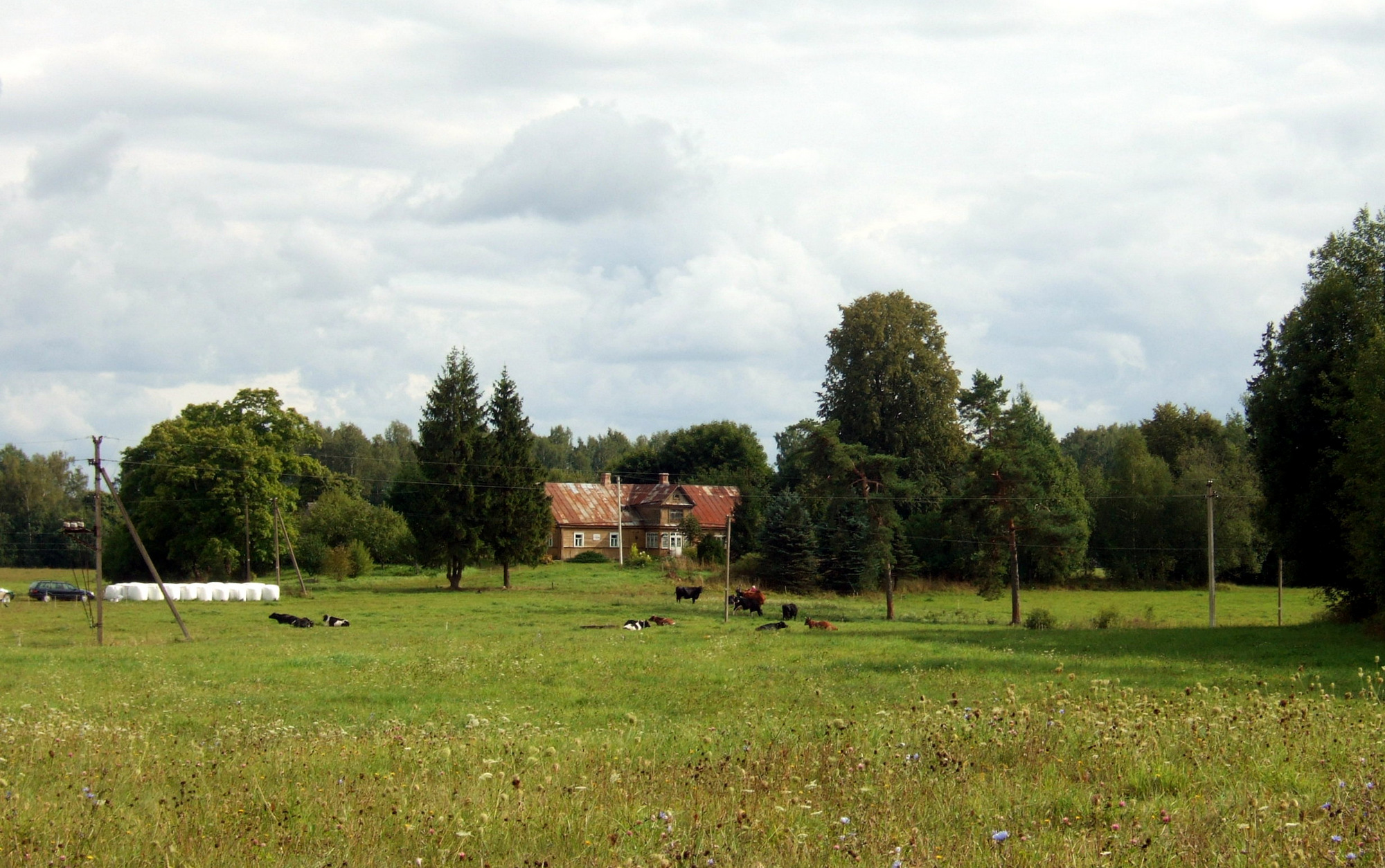
House where Reinys was born

Mečislovas Reinys was born on 5 February 1884 on a farm in Madagaskaras near Daugailiai and Antalieptė, then part of the Russian Empire. He was the youngest of 11 children. His parents owned about 32 hectares (79 acres) of land. His father died when Reinys was seven from a kick by a horse.

Reinys received some education at home and at a primary school in Antalieptė. He was then taken in by his relative, a Catholic priest who worked in Muravanaja Ašmianka. Reinys attended a school there for three years. He then moved to live with relatives in Riga and attend the Riga Alexander Gymnasium. Reinys was an excellent student and graduated with a gold medal in 1900. For some time, he worked as a tutor to earn some money.

From 1901 to 1905, he studied at the Vilnius Priest Seminary. He then received a government stipend for studies at the Saint Petersburg Roman Catholic Theological Academy. His professors included Kazimieras Jaunius, Vincent Hadleŭski, Zygmunt Łoziński, Jurgis Matulaitis-Matulevičius, Adomas Jakštas, Pranciškus Būčys, Jonas Mačiulis-Maironis, Jan Cieplak. He was ordained a priest on 10 June 1907 in Saint Petersburg and held his first mass in his native parish church in Daugailiai. He graduated in 1909 with a master's degree in theology.

=== Doctoral studies ===
He continued his studies at the Catholic University of Leuven (Belgium). His professors included Maurice De Wulf, Albert Michotte, Armand Thiéry, Alphonse Meunier. At the university, he was a member of a Lithuanian student society which read and wrote articles to various Lithuanian periodicals. He spent three vacations in Horsens (Denmark) doing pastoral work among Polish and Lithuanian workers. He defended his doctoral thesis about morality in the works of Vladimir Solovyov in 1912. It was one of the first works to discuss Solovyov's works in western Europe.

Reinys was interested not only in theology, but also in psychology, natural law, natural sciences, geology. After his doctorate, he continued to study natural sciences (including prof. Victor Grégoire) in Leuven and philosophy (including prof. Georg Simmel) at the University of Strasbourg (France).

During his studies, Reinys traveled across Europe and learned multiple languages: Latin, Italian, French, English, Danish, German in addition to the local languages of Lithuanian, Russian, and Polish. He later also learned Spanish.

=== World War I in Vilnius ===
Reinys returned to Lithuania just before the outbreak of World War I and became a vicar at the Church of St. Johns, Vilnius. He started working as a chaplain at the newly establish Lithuanian Vytautas Magnus Gymnasium and Teachers' Seminary maintained by the Lithuanian Education Society Rytas. He later became a teacher of religion, psychology, logic, natural sciences, and political economy. He became a professor at Vilnius Priest Seminary in 1916 and continued to teach until 1922. He taught sociology and philosophy.

During the German occupation, Reinys participated in the Lithuanian political life. He was associated with a small Lithuanian political club which debated Lithuania's post-war future. For this involvement, Reinys was interrogated by the German police in January 1917. Reinys participated in the Vilnius Conference in September 1917 and was elected to the central committee of the Lithuanian Christian Democratic Party which was established after the conference. He was one of the authors of the original party's program. He was reelected to the party's leadership in 1918 and 1925.

From November 1915 to December 1916, and again from August 1918 to June 1922, Reinys was chairman of the Lithuanian Education Society Rytas which maintained Lithuanian primary schools in Vilnius Region. He also worked with Ateitis and Pavasaris Catholic youth organizations. For two years, he was vice-chairman of the Lithuanian Scientific Society. In 1920, he was also elected to the board of the Provisional Committee of Vilnius Lithuanians.

The Red Army captured Vilnius in early January 1919 at the start of the Lithuanian–Soviet War. Authorities of the proclaimed Lithuanian Soviet Socialist Republic arrested Reinys on 22 February 1919. He was held in Lukiškės Prison for giving a speech on 16 February, the first anniversary of the Act of Independence of Lithuania. As Soviets were about to be pushed out of Vilnius by the Polish forces in April 1919, they took several prominent Lithuanians as hostages, including Reinys, Felicija Bortkevičienė, Juozas Vailokaitis, and Liudas Gira, and transported them to prisons in Daugavpils and Smolensk. On 24 July 1919, Vaclovas Sidzikauskas arranged a prisoner exchange in Daugailiai: 15 prominent Lithuanians, including Reinys, for 35 communists.

=== Interwar in Kaunas ===
==== University professor ====
In 1922, Reinys moved from Vilnius (which was incorporated into the Second Polish Republic) to Kaunas, the temporary capital of Lithuania. Reinys was invited to teach at the University of Lithuania and head its department of psychology. At different times he taught general, comparative, and educational psychology, special topics in psychology, and led psychology practical. His lecture notes were published by students in 1931.

In 1931, the ruling Lithuanian Nationalist Union reduced the Faculty of Theology, eliminated the department of psychology, and laid off 18 professors. Reinys was also temporarily dismissed. This prompted Lithuanian clergy to revive ideas about a separate Catholic university. Reinys was in charge of this proposed university and was slated to become its rector. The Holy See approved the university in June 1932 and it was supposed to open in August 1932, but the Lithuanian Nationalist Union postponed it indefinitely. Since the Catholic university was not abolished, but only postponed, Reinys continued to seek official recognition of the university. He represented the university at various gatherings and societies up until 1940. He also prepared annual reports and organized lectures in the name of the university.

After the dismissal in 1931, Reinys quickly returned to the University of Lithuania, but only as a privatdozent, i.e. without a full-time salary. To compensate Reinys and other affected lecturers, remaining professors agreed to donate part of their salary. Reinys continued to teach at the university until 1940.

==== Minister of Foreign Affairs ====
As a member of the Lithuanian Christian Democratic Party, Reinys was selected by Prime Minister Leonas Bistras as the Minister of Foreign Affairs. He served in this capacity from 25 September 1925 to 20 April 1926. Foreign diplomats and Lithuanian opposition did not consider him a strong or independent minister and believed he was assigned to the post only temporarily.

His predecessor, Voldemaras Čarneckis, was forced to resign when he attempted to normalize the relations with Poland. Therefore, after the Locarno Treaties, the new government searched for alternatives – normalize Lithuania's relations with the Holy See, sign a treaty with the Soviet Union, and search for allies in Germany, Latvia, or Estonia.

Lithuania's relations with the Holy See soured after the Concordat of 1925 with Poland which established an ecclesiastical province in Vilnius, thereby acknowledging Poland's claims to the city. Due to rising tensions, official diplomatic relations were severed. With the help of Archbishop Jurgis Matulaitis-Matulevičius, Reinys reestablished diplomatic contacts with the Holy See and agreed to a three-step plan to normalize the relations. The first step was establishing an ecclesiastical province in Lithuania. On 4 April 1926, Pope Pius XI issued a bull which established the Archdiocese of Kaunas in place of the Diocese of Samogitia as well as new Dioceses of Kaišiadorys, Telšiai, Vilkaviškis, and Panevėžys. The Lithuanian opposition attacked the bull, accused the government of "surrendering" its claims to Vilnius, and claimed that Reinys served his ecclesiastical superiors in Vatican first and Lithuania second. This led to Reinys' resignation on 20 April 1926. He also resigned from the Christian Democratic Party.

In relations with Poland, Reinys had to respond to an incident when Polish border guards violated the border, captured about 15 hectares (37 acres) of forest near Kernavė, and took eight Lithuanian policemen as prisoners on 17–22 February 1926. The Lithuanian government prepared a protest note which Reinys personally delivered to Ishii Kikujirō, president of the Council of the League of Nations, on 12 March 1926. The protest was ignored which only bolstered Lithuanian government's decision to seek closer relations with the Soviet Union.

Reinys personally disapproved the government's decision to seek closer relations with the Soviet Union, but pursued its decision. The negotiations began in December 1925 when People's Commissar of Foreign Affairs Georgy Chicherin stopped in Kaunas on his way to Moscow. Reinys prepared the first draft of the Soviet–Lithuanian Non-Aggression Pact which was signed in September 1926, almost five months after Reinys' resignation.

==== Coadjutor bishop of Vilkaviškis ====
In July 1923, Reinys was named a prelate. On 5 April 1926, one day after the papal bull which established the ecclesiastical province in Lithuania, Reinys was appointed as titular bishop of Tiddi and coadjutor bishop of the newly established Diocese of Vilkaviškis which was established mainly from the territory of the Diocese of Sejny. Reinys was consecrated in Kaunas Cathedral by Jurgis Matulaitis-Matulevičius, assisted by Juozapas Kukta and Justinas Staugaitis, on 16 May 1926.

The new bishop Antanas Karosas was already 70-years old. Therefore, he was more passive and tolerant of bad behaviors. Karosas and Reinys did not have a good working relationship as Karosas tried to keep Reinys out of diocese affairs. This prompted a complaint by the younger priests to the Holy See in 1934. Karosas was ordered to allow Reinys a more active role in the curia and allow him to supervise the Vilkaviškis Priest Seminary. Reinys taught psychology at the seminary in 1934–1940. He also conducted canonical visitations of various parishes, led three-day Spiritual Exercises, inspected religious education in schools, etc.

==== Activist ====
Reinys was also active in a number of Lithuanian societies. Reinys was elected to the first board of the Lithuanian Catholic Academy of Science. He was its scientific secretary in 1922–1926, participated in its conferences, and was elected a true member in 1939. Reinys was elected first treasurer of the Union for the Liberation of Vilnius in April 1925. He was also elected to the board of Ateitis, Catholic youth organization, in 1927 and 1930. He was an honorary member and patron-protector of Pavasaris, another Catholic youth organization. In 1927, Reinys prepared new statute for the Catholic Action Center based on the book by Civardi Luigi on the Catholic Action.

In June–September 1937, Reinys toured Lithuanian American and Lithuanian Canadian communities. Commemorating the 550th anniversary of the Christianization of Lithuania, he visited 52 parishes, delivered 67 sermons and 46 speeches, participated in congresses and other events of Lithuanian organizations.

=== Auxiliary archbishop of Vilnius ===
==== Start of World War II ====
Vilnius Region was captured by the Soviet Union after the Invasion of Poland in 1939. Part of the region was transferred to Lithuania according to the Soviet–Lithuanian Mutual Assistance Treaty. The Archdiocese of Vilnius remained part of the Polish ecclesiastical province. Archbishop Romuald Jałbrzykowski supported Polonization efforts and restricted activities of Lithuanian or Belarusian priests. When auxiliary archbishop Kazimierz Mikołaj Michalkiewicz died in February 1940, Lithuanians requested that Pope Pius XI appoint a Lithuanian auxiliary archbishop. On 18 July 1940, Reinys was appointed titular archbishop of Cypsela and auxiliary archbishop of Vilnius. Reinys was also granted the rights of an apostolic administrator in the event of a vacancy on the episcopal see in Vilnius, with the authority of a residential bishop. Archbishop Jałbrzykowski met him with hostility, did not give him any duties in the curia, and complained about him to the Vatican.

==== German occupation ====
After the German invasion of the Soviet Union in June 1941, Vilnius Region became part of the Reichskommissariat Ostland. The territory of the archdiocese was divided into three German administrative units. 80 parishes were located in the Generalbezirk Litauen, 185 in the Generalbezirk Weißruthenien, both of which were part of the Reichskommissariat Ostland. Additionally, 96 parishes were located in the Bezirk Białysok, which was attached to East Prussia.

Since many Polish clergymen joined the anti-Nazi resistance, German Gestapo organized repressions. For example, on 3 March 1942, they raided Vilnius Priest Seminary and arrested 14 professors and about 70 clerics. Lithuanians were later released, while Poles were taken for forced labor. On 26 March, the police arrested and imprisoned 189 Polish nuns and 64 monks from Vilnius in Lukiškės. On 22 March, Germans arrested archbishop Jałbrzykowski and archdiocese's chancellor Adam Sawicki and interned them in Marijampolė. This left Reinys as the administrator of the archdiocese, which was officially confirmed by the Vatican on 22 June 1942. At the same time, Reinys inherited Jałbrzykowski's role as the apostolic administrator of the Archdiocese of Mohilev and the Diocese of Minsk. However, German did not allow Reinys to function in these dioceses and limited his authority to the borders of the Generalbezirk Litauen.

Reinys negotiated with the German authorities to lessen repressions against the clergy. For example, he managed to secure release of 222 nuns and negotiated that arrested priest and monks would be transferred to work camps within Lithuania instead of the Nazi concentration camps. Nothing is known about any assistance provided by Reinys to the imprisoned priests of the archdiocese. The documents only mention that in 1943, he unsuccessfully attempted to secure the release of two priests, Józef Grasewicz and Władysław Małachowski, who were connected with the cult of the Divine Mercy.

During an air raid by the Soviet forces on the night of 23 March 1942, a bomb fell onto the clergy house of the Church of Saint Nicholas, Vilnius. It killed priest Kristupas Čibiras, severely injured Reinys and priest Vincentas Taškūnas. Reinys spent a month in hospital with a broken clavicle.

On 17 June 1942, Reinys called for the organization of two days of solemn services in gratitude for the fact that "German and allied forces had removed Bolshevik atheism from our region," as well as masses for the victims of the war. This was intended to commemorate the "Day of Liberation" established by the Germans on 22 June, marking the anniversary of the German invasion a year earlier.

Reinys continued pastoral work. He delivered sermons, held spiritual exercises, visited hospitals, etc. Unlike Jałbrzykowski, Reinys supported the cult of the Divine Mercy image: he approved a Lithuanian chaplet for the Divine Mercy in May 1942 and allowed to celebrate the Second Sunday of Easter as the Divine Mercy Sunday at the Church of St. Johns, Vilnius in 1946.

==== Tension between Poles and Lithuanians ====
Reinys managed to reopen Vilnius Priest Seminary (it was closed twice by the Germans, in March 1942 and March 1943). The seminary was reopened as a Lithuanian institution, also admitting Belarusians. However, few Poles attended lectures, often declaring themselves as Belarusians or Lithuanians. Jan Uszyłło, the former rector who had been freed from the Šaltupis camp in March, was the only Pole included in the faculty.

Reinys replaced the arrested Polish priests with Lithuanians and Belarusians in Lithuanian- or Belarusian-speaking parishes. This drew ire from the Polish activists who started spreading rumors that repressions against the Polish clergy were orchestrated by Reinys and the Lithuanian Security Police so that Vilnius Region could be "Lithuanized". Polish–Lithuanian relations during World War II grew increasingly tense.

Reinys removed Polish patrons from the ordinary for the year 1943, leaving only St. Casimir and St. Stanislaus, the respective patrons of Lithuania and the Vilnius Cathedral. Reinys also removed a reference to the Virgin Mary as the Queen of Poland in the Litany of the Blessed Virgin Mary as Lithuanians and Belarusians did not agree with such prayer. He also removed the Feast of the Most Holy Virgin Mary, Queen of Poland (3 May) from the liturgical calendar for 1944 as the feast was prohibited by the Germans. This became a particularly contentious issue. After complaints reached the Vatican, Reinys defended that the reinstatement of either the litany or the feast were not possible due to the political situation and offered to resign. Vatican told Reinys to be more sensitive to the Polish needs and did not accept his resignation. The Vatican prohibited Reinys from changing of the language of sermons, as they were the exclusive responsibility of the Polish Episcopal Conference, and the actual ordinary of the diocese was in exile. It also forbade him from participating in the meetings of the Lithuanian Ecclesiastical Province, to which the Archdiocese of Vilnius did not belong. Polish authors continue to portray Reinys as a Lithuanian chauvinist.

==== Soviet occupation ====
After the Operation Bagration, Vilnius was captured by the Red Army and Jałbrzykowski returned to Vilnius on 8 August 1944 and Reinys became vicar general. However, Jałbrzykowski was arrested by the Soviets in late January 1945 and Reinys returned as the administrator of the archdiocese. Soviet NKGB attempted to use Reinys in its anti-Polish campaign and a purge of Polish priests, but he refused.

Soviet NKVD began surveillance of Reinys soon after the Soviet occupation of Lithuania in June 1940. Surviving documents show that NKVD collected reports from 12 different agents in 1940–1941 that focused on Reinys' sermons and personal attitudes towards the Soviet regime and relations between Polish and Lithuanian clergy.

Reinys was first briefly arrested on 6 September 1944 after a gathering of Lithuanian bishops which was not approved by the Soviets. In November 1944, chief of the Lithuanian NKGB Aleksandras Gudaitis-Guzevičius and first secretary of the Lithuanian Communist Party Antanas Sniečkus wanted to arrest Reinys, but officials in Moscow suggested using Reinys to demoralize the anti-Soviet Lithuanian partisans. As leverage, they used Reinys' two nephews imprisoned by the Soviets and seven relatives deported to Siberia during the June deportation in 1941. (Note: The deported relatives were sister Emilija Telyčėnienė (age 76), brothers Kazimieras Reinys (74) and Jonas Reinys (70), sister-in-law Grasilda Musteikytė-Reinienė (55), pregnant niece-in-law Stefanija Reinienė and her two children Aldutė (2) and Pranas Vilius (7 months). In exile, Stefanija gave birth to her daughter Nijolė. Due to harsh living conditions, five member of the exiled family died: Emilija (1941), Pranas-Vilius (1942), Jonas (1942), Kazimieras (1943), and Grasilda (1945). Stefanija and her two surviving children escaped to Lithuania in 1947, but she was deported for the second time. Reinys' nephew and Stefanija's husband Antanas Reinys was arrested in October 1944 and sentenced to ten years in prison. Stefanija and Antanas eventually reunited and returned to Lithuania in 1966. Another nephew Juozas Reinys was arrested right after the family was deported in June 1941.)

In June 1945, Reinys was pressured by the NKGB to write an appeal to the Lithuanian partisans urging them to apply for the "amnesty" and "legalization" campaign announced by the NKGB. Reinys refused to cooperate. On 9 August 1945, Reinys published circular Nežudyk (Thou Shall not Kill). However, it was so vague and abstract that even Soviet writers admitted its limited usefulness. One could apply the circular to the NKGB and its operatives. Nevertheless, thousands of copies of the circular were published and distributed in Lithuania. In March 1946, Reinys issued an instruction to priests ordering them not to get involved in political agitation.

In later part of 1946, anti-religious action intensified. In late 1946, a representative of the Ministry of State Security (MGB) met with all remaining Lithuanian bishops. After these conversations, Teofilius Matulionis and Pranciškus Ramanauskas were arrested, while Reinys was pressed to sign a pledge to consult Soviet security agencies on specified issues; Reinys refused. He also refused to order priests to register with the Soviet authorities and support the establishment of parish committees which would allow Soviet agencies to intervene in church affairs. Reinys was one last obstacle in this Soviet plan since other administrators of dioceses were inclined to cooperate.

==== Soviet prisoner ====
Reinys mugshot taken in 1947

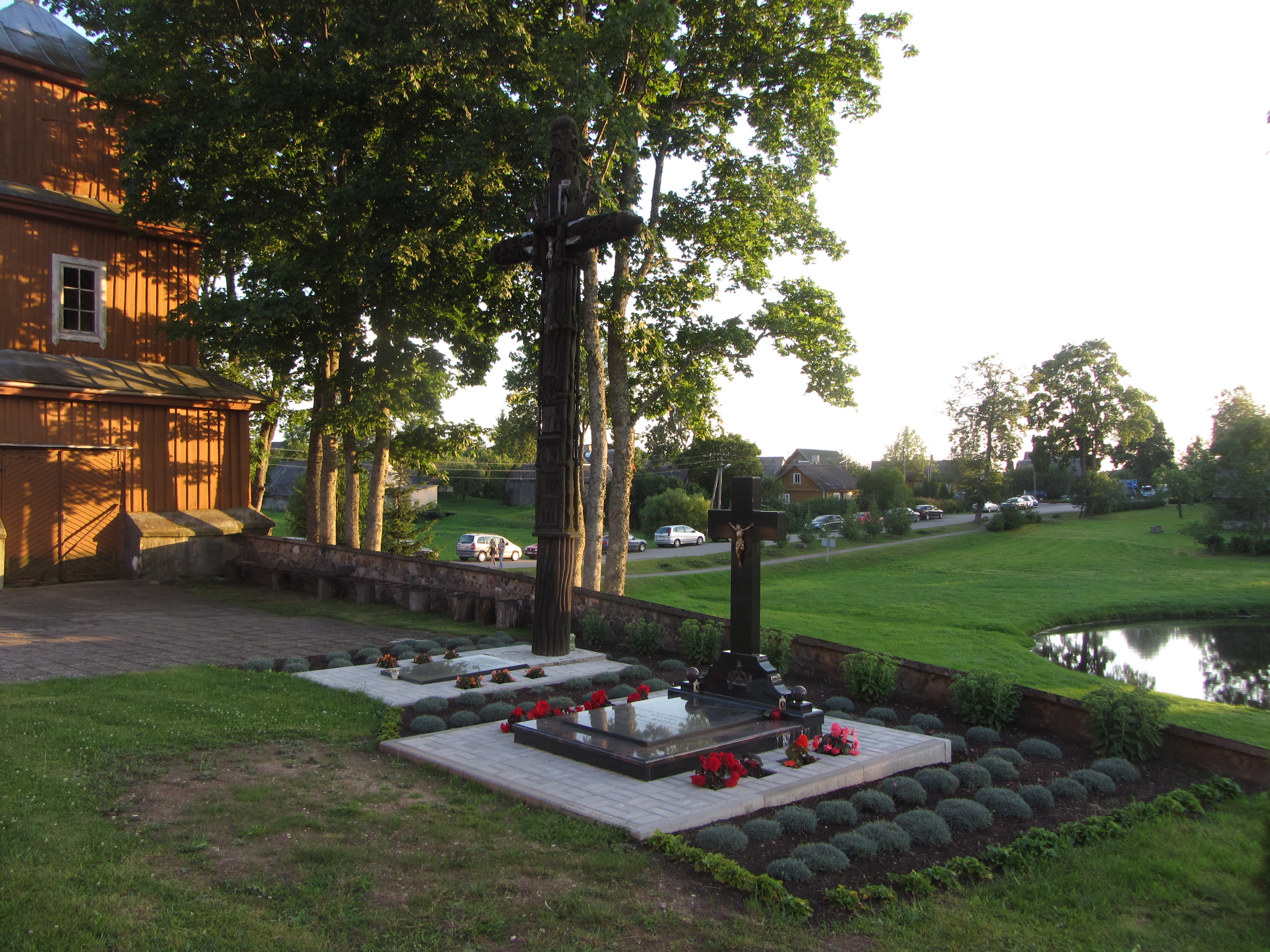
Symbolic grave of Reinys (left) in Daugailiai

Reinys was arrested by Soviet authorities on 12 June 1947. He was interrogated for more than 162 hours mostly at night. His indictment was prepared after three months. It listed specific instances of Reinys' anti-Soviet activities, which included participating in the activities of the Catholic Action Center in interwar Lithuania, publishing various anti-Soviet articles during the German occupation, providing financial support (300 Reichsmarks for the purpose of purchasing books) to a battalion of the Lithuanian Auxiliary Police, attending a meeting of Lithuanian bishop in September 1944 which decided to seek religious lessons in schools and military chaplains in Red Army units, persuading bishop Vincentas Borisevičius not to cooperate with the NKGB in December 1945, and delivering a sermon defending the Vatican after a critical article was published in Sovetskaya Litva in June 1947. These charges demonstrated how difficult it was for the Soviets to find something political in Reinys' actions.

On 15 November 1947, the Special Council of the NKVD sentenced Reinys to eight years in prison and confiscation of property according to the Article 58 of the Penal Code for anti-Soviet agitation and participation in anti-Soviet organizations. Reinys was informed of this decision on 25 December 1947 and transported to the Vladimir Central Prison in January 1948. In early 1953, the Ministry of State Security (MGB) of the Lithuanian SSR prepared a plan of an investigation to uncover the supposed vast Lithuanian Catholic underground led by Reinys. To that end, Reinys was interrogated in Vladimir Prison eight times in March 1953.

In prison, Reinys wrote two clemency requests, one in March 1948 and another to Nikolai Shvernik in August 1948. According to surviving records, Reinys wrote 17 times to the warden. He requested a subscription to Pravda (twice) and English-language The New Times as well as a copy of a book on psychology by Sergei Rubinstein (twice) – all of these requests were denied. Reinys could write few letters to his relatives and receive packages. In 1949–1953, the packages were prohibited while the letters were limited to just two per year. His cellmates included Russian monarchist Vasily Shulgin and leader of Latvian Jews Mordehai Dubin, as well as German diplomat Gotthold Starke and British soldier Frank Kelly who later wrote memoirs about Reinys in prison.

Reinys died in the prison on 8 November 1953. His relatives were informed about his death only in May 1954. The exact cause or circumstances of his death are not known. He was buried in a mass grave; therefore, the exact location of his burial is unknown. There are three symbolic graves of Reinys in Lithuania, all with some soil from the prison's cemetery: the churchyard in his native Daugailiai (July 1990), Deportees' Chapel in Vilnius Cathedral (June 2000), and sculpture of Pensive Christ in Skapiškis (July 2013).

== Publications ==
Reinys delivered many sermons, lectures, speeches. Starting in 1907, he published various articles in Lithuanian periodicals, including Šaltinis, Draugija, Viltis, Tėvynės sargas, Pavasaris, Ateitis, XX amžius. During the German occupation, he published more than 10 articles in Karys and Naujoji Lietuva criticizing communism and bolshevism. In total, he authored more than a hundred articles which were published in 23 different periodicals. Not all articles have been identified as he used various pen names. Researcher Aldona Vasiliauskienė has attributed about 50 articles published in Vilniaus garsas in 1920–1922 that were signed under the pen name Dr. Mututa to Reinys.

In 1921, Reinys translated and published a 242-page psychology textbook by Georgy Chelpanov which was used by various schools during the entire interwar period. It was a free translation; Reinys added or modified the text as he saw fit. Its three main parts discussed cognitive psychology and sensations, feelings, and willful and involuntary movements. It was the first Lithuanian textbook of psychology, therefore Reinys had to come up with Lithuanian words for various technical terms used in psychology.

In 1939, he published his only original study – 107-page book Rasizmo problema (The Problem of Racism). It was Reinys' response to the papal encyclical Mit brennender Sorge of March 1937. In this work, Reinys surveys developments in scientific racism, particularly the use of anthropology and craniometry to distinguish "higher" and "lower" races. He criticized works of Arthur de Gobineau, Houston Stewart Chamberlain, Alfred Rosenberg based on biology, religion, philosophy, pedagogy, and argued that there is no such thing as the Aryan race.

From January 1945 to May 1947, Reinys wrote 27 satirical and sarcastic bulletins T. Aškūnų bei B. Asių kolchozo Moderniojo Cirko biuleteniai (Modern Circus Bulletins of the Kolkhoz of T. Aškūnai and B. Asiai). The works referenced Vincentas Taškūnas, Edmundas Basys, and others who lived in one apartment in Vilnius – they moved there after the bombing of the clergy house of the Church of Saint Nicholas, Vilnius. Kolkhoz referred to the crowded apartment, while modern circus referred to the new Soviet regime. The works showcase Reinys' ability to find humor even in dire circumstances. These handwritten bulletins were hidden by Taškūnas' niece and were first published in 1999.

== Canonization efforts ==
Reinys was rehabilitated by the Supreme Court of the Lithuanian SSR in February 1989. In February 1990, Lithuanians submitted documents to the Roman Curia to open the canonisation case for Reinys along with Teofilius Matulionis and Vincentas Borisevičius, two other Lithuanian bishops persecuted by the Soviets. Pope John Paul II mentioned these three in a 1993 speech at the Hill of Crosses. The official beatification case was opened on 14 September 1998. On 7 May 2000, Pope John Paul II recognized 114 Lithuanian martyrs, among them Reinys.

== Character ==
Reinys' contemporaries wrote about his frugal lifestyle and generosity for those in need. According to one memoir, he purchased a simple fur coat only after being told by a doctor to dress warmer. He continued to dress modestly in priest robes even when he was the Minister of Foreign Affairs. He recorded his expenses in notebooks. A surviving notebook from December 1924 to May 1929 shows that he donated to 48 different organizations as well as different churches, parishes, and other causes. He also supported individual students, among them Salomėja Nėris and Jonas Grinius, as well as his family members. He spent considerable sums on literature and periodicals – the notebook shows that he subscribed to 32 different periodicals. Overall, over the 54 months, Reinys spent approximately 54,500 litas on charitable causes, 13,300 litas on literature, and 52,000 litas for other expenses.

Reinys was a teetotaler since 1910. This caused several diplomatic incidents when Reinys was the Minister of Foreign Affairs and dignitaries noticed that they were toasted not with a glass of wine, but rose colored water.

Gotthold Starke in his memoirs about Vladimir Prison wrote that Reinys exhibited strong faith, Christian love and humility and had become a moral authority among the prisoners. According to Starke, Reinys occasionally received some money from his relatives which he used to buy some bread or sugar and share it with other inmates. Once, an inmate stole from Reinys who said nothing but gave a double portion to that inmate next time. Frank Kelly similarly wrote that Reinys prayed frequently and was very calm.

== Bibliography ==
- Čepėnas, Juozapas (2000). "Arkivyskupas Mečislovas Reinys" (PDF). Lietuvių katalikų mokslo akademijos metraštis (in Lithuanian). 17: 439–458. ISSN 1392-0502.
- Čepėnas, Pranas (1986). Naujųjų laikų Lietuvos istorija. Vol. II. Chicago: Dr. Kazio Griniaus Fondas. OCLC 3220435.
- "J. E. Vyskupas Mečislovas Reinys" (PDF). Darbininkas (in Lithuanian). 46. 18 June 1937.
- Eidintas, Alfonsas; Žalys, Vytautas; Senn, Alfred Erich (1999). Tuskenis, Edvardas (ed.). Lithuania in European Politics: The Years of the First Republic, 1918-1940 (Paperback ed.). New York: St. Martin's Press. ISBN 0-312-22458-3.
- Grickevičius, Artūras (2016). Katalikų kunigų seminarija Kaune: 150-ies metų istorijos bruožai (in Lithuanian). Versus aureus. ISBN 9786094671999.
- Grinius, Jonas (1972). "Teologijos-Filosofijos Fakultetas". In Čepėnas, Pranas (ed.). Lietuvos Universitetas 1579–1803–1922 (in Lithuanian). Chicago: The Association of Lithuanian-American Professors. OCLC 2152067.
- Ibianska, Vanda (10 January 2018). "Dievo tarnas Mečislovas Reinys" (in Lithuanian). Bernardinai.lt.
- Jegelevičius, Sigitas (2004). "Dialogai ir konfliktai: Arkivyskupas Mečislovas Reinys Vilniuje (1939–1944)". Lietuvių katalikų mokslo akademijos metraštis (in Lithuanian). 24: 521–535. ISSN 1392-0502.
- John Paul II (7 September 1993). "Viaggio Apostolico in Lituania: Celebrazione presso il "Monte delle Croci" a Šiauliai". Omelia Di Giovanni Paolo II (in Italian). Dicastero per la Comunicazione - Libreria Editrice Vaticana.
- Juozevičiūtė, Vilma (February 2014). "Mečislovas Reinys 1884 02 03–1953 11 08" (PDF). Atmintinos dienos (in Lithuanian). Genocide and Resistance Research Centre of Lithuania.
- Kasparavičius, Algimantas (1999). "Kunigas Mečislovas Reinys diplomatinėje tarnyboje". In Česonis, Alfonsas (ed.). Lietuvos užsienio reikalų ministrai: 1918–1940 (in Lithuanian). Kaunas: Šviesa. ISBN 5-430-02696-4.
- Katelytė, Rita (2009). "Mečislovo Reinio laisvai versto Psichologijos vadovėlio psichologijos terminų reikšmė ir kilmė". Terminologija (in Lithuanian). 16: 198–216. ISSN 1392-267X.
- Katilius, Algimantas (2011). "Lietuvių studentų katalikų draugijos Leveno universitete XX a. pradžioje". Lietuvių katalikų mokslo akademijos metraštis (in Lithuanian). 34: 141–167. ISSN 1392-0502.
- Krahel, Tadeusz (1986). "Zarządzanie archidiecezją wileńską w czasie II wojny światowej" (PDF). Studia Teologiczne. 4: 121–131.
- "Reabilituotas a.a. vyskupas Mečislovas Reinys". Lietuvos katalikų bažnyčios kronika (in Lithuanian). 81. 1989.
- Laukaitytė, Regina (2005). "Lietuvos bažnyčių misijos okupuotose SSRS srityse 1941–1944 m." (PDF). Lituanistica (in Lithuanian). 3: 1–14. ISSN 0235-716X.
- Laukaitytė, Regina (2008). "Archidiecezja wileńska w latach 1942–1944 pod władzą Mečislovasa Reinysa" (PDF). Biuletyn Historii Pogranicza (in Polish). 3: 35–52.
- Liekis, Algimantas (2011). Juodieji Lietuvos istorijos puslapiai (PDF) (in Lithuanian). Vol. II. Mokslotyros institutas. ISBN 978-9986-795-67-4.
- Lukšas, Aras (18 November 2011). "Pasirinkęs kankinio kelią" (in Lithuanian). Lietuvos žinios.
- Matulis, Steponas (1961). "Arkivyskupas Mečislovas Reinys" (PDF). Lietuvių katalikų mokslo akademijos suvažiavimo darbai (in Lithuanian). IV: 268–271.
- Pipiras, Nerijus; Žemaitis, Kęstutis (2014). "Pastoracinio darbo kryptys arkivyskupo Mečislovo Reinio studijoje "Rasizmo problema"". Soter (in Lithuanian). 51 (79): 15–25. doi:10.7220/2335-8785.51(79).2. hdl:20.500.12259/31175. ISSN 2335-8785.
- Pipiras, Nerijus; Žemaitis, Kęstutis (2016). "Arkivyskupas Mečislovas Reinys – Dievo gailestingumo žinios skleidėjas ir kulto platintojas". Soter (in Lithuanian). 57 (85): 33–42. doi:10.7220/2335-8785.57(85).2. hdl:20.500.12259/31185. ISSN 2335-8785.
- Pruskus, Valdas (2001). "Jaunosios kartos katalikų intelektualų požiūris į fašizmą ir nacionalsocializmą tarpukario Lietuvoje". Problemos (in Lithuanian). 60: 57–78. doi:10.15388/Problemos.2001.60.6781. ISSN 2424-6158.
- Pšibilskis, Vygintas Bronius (2009). Mykolas Biržiška: patrioto, mokslininko, kultūrininko gyvenimo ir veiklos pėdsakai (in Lithuanian). Vilniaus universiteto leidykla. ISBN 978-9955-33-462-0.
- Redakcija (1972). "Jo Eksc. Vysk. Mečislovas Reinys" (PDF). Lietuvių katalikų mokslo akademijos suvažiavimo darbai (in Lithuanian). 3: 475–481.
- Starke, Gotthold (29 December 1977). "Paskutinieji velionies arkivyskypo Reinio metai" (PDF). Mūsų Lietuva (in Lithuanian). 52 (1535): 7–8.
- Streikus, Arūnas, ed. (2000). Lietuvos vyskupai kankiniai sovietiniame teisme (PDF) (in Lithuanian). Lithuanian Catholic Academy of Science. ISBN 9986-592-28-3.
- Streikus, Arūnas (2004). "Arkivyskupas Mečislovas Reinys sovietiniame teisme" (PDF). Lietuvių katalikų mokslo akademijos metraštis (in Lithuanian). 24: 537–542. ISSN 1392-0502.
- Svarauskas, Artūras (2016). "Reinys Mečislovas" (PDF). In Tamošaitis, Mindaugas; Bitautas, Algis; Svarauskas, Artūras (eds.). Lietuvos Respublikos 1918–1940 m. vyriausybių ministrų biografinis žodynas (in Lithuanian). Vilnius: Mokslo ir enciklopedijų leidybos centras. ISBN 978-5-420-01778-4.
- Vasiliauskienė, Aldona (13 March 1999a). "Iš arkivysk. Mečislovo Reinio gyvenimo" (PDF). Draugas. Literatūra, menas, mokslas (in Lithuanian). 53 (11).
- Vasiliauskienė, Aldona (1999b). "Arkivyskupas Mečislovas Reinys ir "T. Aškūnų bei B. Asių kolchozo Moderniojo Cirko biuleteniai"". Istorija (in Lithuanian). 42: 12–30. ISSN 2029-7181.
- Vasiliauskienė, Aldona (2000). "Arkivyskupas Mečislovas Reinys Lietuvos ypatingojo archyvo dokumentuose (1940-1941 m.)". Soter (in Lithuanian). 4 (32): 57–67. ISSN 1392-7450.
- Vasiliauskienė, Aldona (2003a). "Arkivyskupo Mečislovo Reinio stoiškumas: nepavykęs čekistų šantažas giminių likimu" (PDF). Lietuvių katalikų mokslo akademijos suvažiavimo darbai (in Lithuanian). 18: 731–746. ISSN 1392-0499.
- Vasiliauskienė, Aldona (2003b). "LKMA genezės aspektai". Lietuvių katalikų mokslo akademijos metraštis (in Lithuanian). 22: 81–126. ISSN 1392-0502.
- Vasiliauskienė, Aldona (2004). "Arkivyskupo Mečislovo Reinio ketvirtoji "Išlaidų knygelė"". Lietuvių katalikų mokslo akademijos metraštis. 24: 123–151. ISSN 1392-0502.
- Vasiliauskienė, Aldona (19 October 2005). "Arkiv. Mečislovas Reinys pasirašinėjo Mututa ir dr. Mututa". XXI amžius (in Lithuanian). 78 (1379). ISSN 2029-1299.
- Vasiliauskienė, Aldona (2006). "M. Reinys – krikščioniškosios pedagogikos universalumo puoselėtojas" (PDF). Soter (in Lithuanian). 17 (45): 85–97. ISSN 1392-7450.
- Vasiliauskienė, Aldona (2011a). "Arkivyskupas Mečislovas Reinys: akademinė veikla (1922–1940)" (PDF). Soter (in Lithuanian). 39 (67): 95–114. ISSN 1392-7450.
- Vasiliauskienė, Aldona (2011b). "Arkivyskupas Mečislovas Reinys: kalinio Mečislovo Reinio asmens byla Nr. 3145". Genocidas ir Rezistencija (in Lithuanian). 1 (29): 146–179. ISSN 1392-3463.
- Vasiliauskienė, Aldona (5 January – 11 May 2013). "Dr. kun. Jonas Steponavičius: kovotojas dėl lietuvybės Vilnijos krašte". Voruta (in Lithuanian). 1–10 (765–774). ISSN 1392-0677.
- Vasiliauskienė, Aldona (21 November 2015). "Dievo tarno M. Reinio simboliniai kapai Lietuvoje". Lietuvos aidas (in Lithuanian): 6–7. ISSN 1822-5713.
- Veilentienė, Audronė (16 February 2013). "Vasario 16-oji: pirmosios Nepriklausomybės metinės" (PDF). Voruta (in Lithuanian). 4 (768): 15. ISSN 1392-0677.
- Weeks, Theodore R. (2015). Vilnius Between Nations, 1795–2000. Northern Illinois University Press. ISBN 978-1-60909-191-0.
- Žemaitis, Kęstutis (2000). "Vyskupas Mečislovas Reinys ir Vilkaviškio vyskupija". Lietuvių katalikų mokslo akademijos metraštis (in Lithuanian). 16: 229–236. ISSN 1392-0502.
- Žemaitis, Kęstutis (2004). "Vyskupas Mečislovas Reinys – Vilkaviškio kunigų seminarijoje ir vyskupijoje" (PDF). Lietuvių katalikų mokslo akademijos metraštis (in Lithuanian). 24: 513–519. ISSN 1392-0502.
- Zugger, Christopher Lawrence (2001). The Forgotten: Catholics of the Soviet Empire from Lenin through Stalin. Syracuse, NY: Syracuse University Press. ISBN 0-8156-0679-6.
