= Vilniaus rytojus =

Lithuanian-language newspaper

Vilniaus rytojus (transl. Tomorrow of Vilnius) was a Lithuanian-language newspaper published in Vilnius (Wilno, Vilna) between 1928 and 1937. Published by the Provisional Committee of Vilnius Lithuanians, the newspaper defended the rights of Lithuanians in Vilnius Region which was part of the Second Polish Republic but was claimed by the interwar Lithuania. Due to these tensions, the newspaper was subject to strict censorship by the Polish authorities and was forcibly closed in October 1937. It was the longest running Lithuanian periodical in the Vilnius Region.

== History ==
=== Establishment ===
One-time newspapers published after October 1937
Title	Date	Official editor
Atgarsiai	14 October 1937	Petras Bilkis
Naujienos	24 November 1937	Krištapas Čibiras
Mūsų žinios	11 December 1937	Alfonsas Burlingis
Reikalai	17 December 1937	Stasys Micius
Šventadienis	22 December 1937	Liudvikas Cicėnas
Mūsų mintys	31 December 1937	Ona Juodelytė
Mūsų dienos	6 January 1938	Bronius Tomaševičius
Mūsų kelias (Note: The issue was confiscated by the Polish police.)	13 January 1938	Alfonsas Burlingis
Mūsų balsai	20 January 1938	Alfonsas Burlingis
Lietuvis	27 January 1938	Motiejus Kurila
Atbalsiai	2 February 1938	Rišardas Pleskačiauskas
Tautietis	10 February 1938	Aleksandras Taraila
Tautos kelias	16 February 1938	Kazys Andruškevičius
Kelias	24 February 1938	Albinas Lapinskas
Pastangos	4 March 1938	Joakimas Faraponis
Takas	10 March 1938	Stasys Micius
Šis tas naujo	16 March 1938	Krištapas Čibiras
Paskutinės žinios	24 March 1938	Alfonsas Burlingis
Sąlygos	31 March 1938	Motiejus Kurila
Viltis	7 April 1938	Liudvikas Cicėnas
Gyvenimas	8 April 1938	Rišardas Pleskačiauskas
Mūsų buitis	14 April 1938	Silvestras Urbonavičius
Mūsų likimas	28 April 1938	Stasys Micius

In October 1928, the Provisional Committee of Vilnius Lithuanians decided to discontinue three Lithuanian periodicals – Vilniaus aidas, Dirva, and Kelias – and replace them with the weekly Vilniaus rytojus. The combined publication was shorter than the discontinued periodicals, which led to some complaints.

The first issue was published on 1 December 1928. Like most Lithuanian newspapers in the city, it was printed at the Ruch printing house. Its circulation was about 4,000 copies. Initially, it was an eight-page weekly published on Saturdays. In October 1929, it increased the frequency to twice a week. In 1930, the newspaper launched a supplement Mūsų artojas for farmers and reduced its page count to four. In 1932, it launched another supplement Aušrelė for children, of which 172 issues were printed.

=== Conflicts with Polish authorities ===
From the very beginning, the newspaper attracted attention of the Polish authorities. Its second and sixth issues were confiscated by the police for printing articles deemed to be anti-Polish. These articles were written by Kristupas Čibiras and Petras Kraujalis. In such cases, the newspaper attempted to reprint the issue without the offending content. The confiscations were followed by monetary fines and court cases. In same cases, the publishers prevailed and were acquitted. In several instances, the publishers appealed court judgements all the way to the Supreme Court of Poland. Such confiscations increased substantially in 1935 and by 1937; there were 8 confiscated issues in 1935, 11 issues in 1936, and 16 issues in 1937. Eventually, on 26 October 1937, the newspaper was officially closed by the Polish government. In total, 874 issues of Vilniaus rytojus were printed.

Vilniaus rytojus was replaced by a series of one-time newspapers under different titles and official editors to exploit loopholes in the Polish law. In April 1938, after the Polish ultimatum to Lithuania, the situation somewhat normalized and Aidas was established as a replacement of Vilniaus rytojus.

== Content ==
=== Newspaper ===
In its first issue, Vilniaus rytojus declared its mission to defend and promote two core values – Lithuanian national identity and Catholicism. Thus the newspaper was right-leaning and reflective of the ideology of the Lithuanian Christian Democratic Party.

The newspaper styled itself as a newspaper of politics, society, and literature, but published very few literary texts. A typical issue contained editorials, political review, agricultural news and advice, news from Lithuania, chronicles of local events, short news from various towns and villages. In 1929, it added section for healthcare and newly published books. Most of the attention was devoted to Lithuanians living in Vilnius Region – anti-Lithuanian policies of Poland, issues concerning Lithuanian-language schools (many of them maintained by the Lithuanian Education Society Rytas), activities of various Lithuanian societies, etc. It acted as an organ of the Provisional Committee of Vilnius Lithuanians.

=== Supplements ===
Farmer's supplement Mūsų artojas published articles on agriculture, husbandry, and horticulture as well as practical advice to farmers and their wives.

Children's supplement Aušrelė published short stories, poems, articles on history, geography, nature, as well as didactic lectures. It increased its page count from eight to 16 in 1935 and frequency from every two weeks to weekly in 1937. Often Aušrelė was the only Lithuanian text available to children in villages. Therefore, the issues sometimes were collected, bound, and sold as books.

The newspaper published literature works as separate books which were often distributed for no additional costs to its subscribers. In this series, texts by Rapolas Mackonis and plays by Juozas Kanopka were published.

== Personnel ==
The official editor and publisher was Julius Navikas, a 70-year-old blacksmith from Antakalnis. He was paid 60 or 75 Polish złotys per month but was not involved with the editorial process. As the official editor, he was legally responsible for the newspaper's content and thus, when issues were confiscated by the police, he was the one put on trial. The actual editor-in-chief was Vincas Budrevičius. He worked as a head of administration of the Lithuanian Vytautas Magnus Gymnasium and wrote very little. He did edit submitted texts to remove strongest anti-Polish sentiments and became known for his calm and restrained editing style.

The editorial team included Rapolas Mackonis (Mackevičius), Antanas Juknevičius, Silvestras Urbonavičius. Mackonis was the most prominent contributor to the newspaper. His texts sometimes took five pages of a single issue. His most popular articles were collected and published as separate books Kovoje užgimtąją kalbą (1929) about the Lithuanian press ban and Tautinės mažumos (1937) about the national minorities.
