= Kristupas Čibiras =

Lithuanian Roman Catholic priest (1888–1942)

- Born: 14 December 1888; Radeikiškė, Russian Empire
- Died: 24 March 1942 (aged 53); Vilnius, Generalbezirk Litauen
- Cause of death: Soviet air raid
- Burial place: Rasos Cemetery
- Education: Vilnius Priest Seminary; Saint Petersburg Roman Catholic Theological Academy
- Occupation: Roman Catholic priest
- Known for: Lithuanian activism in Vilnius Region
- Board member of: Lithuanian Education Society Rytas

Kristupas Čibiras (14 December 1888 – 24 March 1942) was a Lithuanian Roman Catholic priest known for his activism in Vilnius Region which was contested between Lithuania and the Second Polish Republic.

Educated at the Saint Petersburg Roman Catholic Theological Academy, Čibiras serves as a vicar the Church of St. Peter and St. Paul (1915–1924) and dean of the Church of Saint Nicholas (1924–1942) in Vilnius. The Church of Saint Nicholas was the only church in Vilnius offering Lithuanian-language services. Čibiras was killed in a Soviet air raid in March 1942.

In addition to his pastoral duties, Čibiras was active in the Lithuanian cultural life. He contributed articles to various Lithuanian periodicals and was publisher and editor of Vilniaus garsas (1920–1921). He was teacher and chaplain at Vilnius Vytautas Magnus Gymnasium and director of the teachers' seminary maintained by the Lithuanian Education Society Rytas. When the seminary was closed by the Polish authorities in 1927, Čibiras was held in Lukiškės Prison for about three weeks. He was then chairman of Švenčionys Rytas Society and teacher at its gymnasium. After the death of Petras Kraujalis in August 1933, Čibiras became the chairman of the Lithuanian Education Society Rytas. Čibiras fought to keep Lithuanian schools and readings rooms open, but Rytas was banned in February 1938.

Čibiras was involved with numerous other Lithuanian societies. He was the long-term chairman of the Vilnius Lithuanian Catholic Temperance Society (originally a chapter of the Lithuanian Catholic Temperance Society), chairman of the Vilnius Lithuanian Charitable Society (successor to the Lithuanian Society for the Relief of War Sufferers), board member of the Provisional Committee of Vilnius Lithuanians and the Lithuanian Scientific Society.

== Biography ==
Čibiras was born on 14 December 1888 in Radeikiškė near Naujasis Daugėliškis in the present-day Ignalina District Municipality, then part of Vilna Governorate of the Russian Empire. He graduated from Vilnius Priest Seminary in 1911 and continued his education at the Saint Petersburg Roman Catholic Theological Academy. He was ordained as a priest in 1914 and earned master's in theology in 1915.

After graduation, he was assigned as a vicar to the Church of St. Peter and St. Paul in Vilnius. In September 1924, he was reassigned as dean to the Church of Saint Nicholas which was the only church in Vilnius offering Lithuanian-language services. He continued in this role until his death on 24 March 1942. He was killed when a bomb fell on the clergy house of the Church of Saint Nicholas during a Soviet air raid on the night of 23 March. The same bomb injured bishop Mečislovas Reinys and priest Vincentas Taškūnas.

Čibiras was buried at Rasos Cemetery near Jonas Basanavičius. His grave was added to the Registry of Cultural Property in 2000.

== Activism ==
Čibiras moved to Vilnius during World War I. The city frequently changed hands until it was captured during the Żeligowski's Mutiny in October 1920 and officially incorporated into the Second Polish Republic in April 1922. Lithuania continued to claim the city as its capital. As a result of this territorial conflict, Poland implemented various Polonisation policies and placed restrictions on Lithuanian activities in the region.

=== Newspapers ===
Čibiras began publishing articles in the Lithuanian press in 1914. He frequently signed the articles under the pen name A. Radeika. In particular, Čibiras contributed articles to Aušra which was revived in July 1919 but banned in November 1919. Aušra was replaced by Vilniaus garsas in January 1920; Čibiras was its publisher and editor until July 1921. This newspaper was closed by the Polish authorities in May 1922.

Čibiras was involved in Garsas (1922–1923), Vilniaus rytojus (1928–1937), Jaunimo draugas (1926–1937). The periodicals were subject to Polish censorship and issues were frequently confiscated. For example, the second issue of Vilniaus rytojus was confiscated because of an article by Čibiras (signed under the pen name K. Pupeika) in which he lamented Polonization of Vilnius Region. Čibiras became less involved with the press after he became chairman of the Lithuanian Education Society Rytas in 1933.

=== Education ===
In 1917, he began teaching at Vilnius Vytautas Magnus Gymnasium (first Lithuanian-language high school in the city) and was school's chaplain. He taught liturgy, dogmatics, Church history, psychology, logic, and Latin. He published two textbooks on dogmatic theology (1920) and Christian liturgy (1922). The liturgical textbook was more popular; it saw its 5th edition in 1947 at a displaced persons camp in Dillingen an der Donau.

In August 1926, he became the director of the teachers' seminary maintained by the Lithuanian Education Society Rytas. In retribution for closing Polish schools in Lithuania, Poland closed 44 Lithuanian schools and the teachers' seminary on 4–5 October 1927. Čibiras, Rytas' chairman Petras Kraujalis, and 23 other Lithuanian teachers and activists were arrested. Čibiras was held for three weeks in Lukiškės Prison. He later faced other forms of harassment, including prohibition by bishop Romuald Jałbrzykowski to work on Vilniaus rytojus, a court case and a fine of 25 Polish złotys for signing his name in Lithuanian (Čibiras) and not Polish (Czybir), a fine of 300 złotys or 30-day arrest for unsanitary conditions at a Lithuanian dormitory, revocation of his teaching license, and even a revocation of permit to own a radio.

In 1928–1930, he was chairman of Švenčionys Rytas Society (a branch of the Lithuanian Education Society Rytas which had become independent in 1920) and teacher at its gymnasium. In 1930, he returned to Vilnius Vytautas Magnus Gymnasium and continued teaching until 1939.

=== Societies ===
Grave of Čibiras in Rasos Cemetery

During World War I, Čibiras organized aid to war refugees and orphans. In 1917, Čibiras attended Vilnius Conference.

After the death of Petras Kraujalis in August 1933, Čibiras became the chairman of the Lithuanian Education Society Rytas which organized and maintained Lithuanian primary schools. At the time, Rytas was under increasing Polish pressure. Under various pretexts, Polish authorities closed Lithuanian schools and Rytas attempted to shift focus on education of adults and establishing reading rooms. These activities were also scrutinized and restricted. Čibiras fought to preserve the schools, petitioning various Polish institutions and courts. Eventually, in February 1938, Rytas was banned. Čibiras was reelected as Rytas chairman when the society was resurrected between the Polish ultimatum of March 1938 and the Soviet occupation in June 1940.

Čibiras was involved in various other societies. From 1924 to 1926, Čibiras was the vice-chairman of the Provisional Committee of Vilnius Lithuanians which a political center of Lithuanian activities in Vilnius Region. He was the long-term chairman of the Vilnius Lithuanian Catholic Temperance Society (Vilniaus lietuvių katalikų blaivybės draugija). It was established in 1912 as a chapter of the Lithuanian Catholic Temperance Society and became an independent society in 1924. In March 1927, after the death of Jonas Basanavičius, Čibiras was elected to the board of the Vilnius Lithuanian Charitable Society (Vilniaus lietuvių labdarybės draugija) which was the successor of the Lithuanian Society for the Relief of War Sufferers. In 1930, he was elected chairman of the charitable society and continued in this role until August 1936. In May 1934, Čibiras was elected the vice-chairman of the Lithuanian Scientific Society.

According to the memoirs of Antanas Juozas Mažiulis published in 1981, in late 1941, during the German occupation of Lithuania, Jonas Virbickas found 1,000 to 2,000 blank pages of paper used to print identity documents. He then printed the fillable forms and transferred them to Čibiras who used them to supply Jews with fake Lithuanian identity documents (Church of Saint Nicholas was just outside the walls of Vilna Ghetto).

== Legacy ==
In 1942, a white marble memorial plaque by sculptor Rapolas Jakimavičius was installed at the Church of Saint Nicholas.

In 1948, sculptor Antanas Kmieliauskas created a sculpture of Saint Christopher carrying baby Jesus (a symbol from the coat of arms of Vilnius) which he wanted to install on Čibiras' grave. However, Soviet authorities did not permit it. Instead, in 1957–1959, the sculpture was placed in the churchyard of the Church of Saint Nicholas.

In 1991, a street in Naujoji Vilnia was named after Čibiras.

== Bibliography ==
- Aničas, Jonas (1999). Antanas ir Emilija Vileišiai: Gyvenimo ir veiklos bruožai (in Lithuanian). Alma littera. ISBN 9789986027942.
- Biržiška, Mykolas (1930). Vilniaus Golgota: okupuotosios Lietuvos lietuvių darbo ir kančių 1919–1928 metų dienoraštis (in Lithuanian). Kaunas: Sąjunga Vilniui vaduoti.
- Biržiška, Vaclovas; et al., eds. (1954). "Čibiras, Kristupas". Lietuvių enciklopedija (in Lithuanian). Vol. 4. South Boston: Juozas Kapočius. p. 179.
- Būtautas, N. (26 September 1981). ""Į Laisvę" verpetuose. Prisiminimai ir įspūdžiai iš spaudos darbo vokiečių okupacijoje" (PDF). Draugas. Mokslas, menas, literatūra (in Lithuanian). Vol. 225, no. 334. pp. 1–4.
- Česnulis, Vytautas Valentinas (26 August 2017). ""Kelio" ir "Vilniaus rytojaus" konfiskavimai. Julius Navikas". Voruta (in Lithuanian). 8 (838): 14–15. ISSN 1392-0677.
- Ereminas, Gintautas (2015). "Lietuvių švietimas Vilniaus krašte 1920–1939 m." Gimtasai kraštas (in Lithuanian). I: 18–27. ISSN 2029-0101.
- Grybienė, Aida (2009). "Laikraštis "Vilniaus rytojus" (1928–1937): leidimo istorija ir sklaida". Lietuvos mokslų akademijos Vrublevskių biblioteka (in Lithuanian). 2005–2006: 63–66. ISSN 1648-9772.
- Jurginis, Juozas (1975). "Lietuvių mokslo draugija". In Merkys, Vytautas (ed.). Mokslo, kultūros ir švietimo draugijos. Iš lietuvių kultūros istorijos (in Lithuanian). Mokslas. OCLC 13601524.
- Juzefovičius, Romualdas (2015). "Vilnijos lietuvių švietėjas: vertybinės Kristupo Čibiro sampratos ir jų sklaida". In Bitautas, Algis (ed.). Edvardas Kriščiūnas (in Lithuanian). Vilnius: Lietuvos edukologijos universiteto leidykla. pp. 81–92. ISBN 9786094710179.
- Kačerauskas, Jonas (2013). Blaivybė Lietuvoje: istorija ir dabartis (PDF) (in Lithuanian). Vilnius: Diemedžio leidykla. ISBN 9789986231776.
- Klimka, Libertas (2011). "Vilniaus Vytauto Didžiojo gimnazijos įkūrimo aplinkybės ir pirmieji jos dešimtmečiai" (PDF). In Bronė Puchovičienė, Danutė; Raščiuvienė, Irena; Zabarskaitė, Jolanta (eds.). Vilniaus Vytauto Didžiojo gimnazijos protokolai: (1915–1940 ir 1953–1955 metai) (in Lithuanian). Vilnius: Europos kalbų ir kultūrų dialogo tyrėjų asociacija. pp. 25–42. ISBN 9786094201783.
- Kultūros vertybių registras. "Vilniaus senųjų kapinių, vad. Rasų kapinėmis, komplekso kunigo Kristupo Čibiro kapas" (in Lithuanian). Kultūros paveldo departamentas.
- Lazauskaitė, Jurgita (2025). "Kristupas Čibiras". Vilnijos vartai (in Lithuanian). Vilniaus apskrities A. Mickevičiaus viešoji biblioteka.
- Maceika, Juozas (2016). "Vilniaus lietuvių spaudiniai 1919–1939 m." Bibliotheca Lituana (in Lithuanian). 10: 355–461. ISSN 2424-4422.
- Mackonis, Rapolas (2011). "Litewski kler Wilna w latach międzywojennych w świetle wspomnień Rapolasa Mackonisa". Krakowskie pismo kresowe (in Polish). 3. Translated by Pecela, Kamil: 141–174. ISSN 2392-120X.
- Misiūnas, Remigijus (2003). Barakų kultūros knygos: lietuvių DP leidyba 1945–1952 (in Lithuanian). Vilnius: Versus aureus. ISBN 9955601051.
- Misius, Kazys (2023a). Vilniaus golgota: okupuotosios Lietuvos lietuvių darbo ir kančių dienoraštis. 1933 m. vasaris – 1935 m. liepa (PDF) (in Lithuanian). Vol. III. Vilnius: Versmė. ISBN 978-609-486-054-6.
- Misius, Kazys (2023b). Vilniaus golgota: okupuotosios Lietuvos lietuvių darbo ir kančių dienoraštis. 1935 m. rugpjūtis – 1938 m. kovas (PDF) (in Lithuanian). Vol. IV. Vilnius: Versmė. ISBN 978-609-486-055-3.
- Šetkus, Benediktas (2007). "Lenkų mokyklų steigimas Lietuvoje 1926 m." Istorija. Mokslo darbai (in Lithuanian). 65: 38–47. ISSN 1392-0456.
- Sperskienė, Rasa (9 September 2014). "Nauji iššūkiai". Lietuvos visuomenė Pirmojo pasaulinio karo pradžioje: įvykiai, draugijos, asmenybės (in Lithuanian). Wroblewski Library of the Lithuanian Academy of Sciences.
- Tyla, Antanas (29 April 2017). "Lietuvių konferencija, jos reikšmė ir anykštėnų indėlis". Voruta (in Lithuanian). 4 (834): 12. ISSN 1392-0677.
- Vasiliauskienė, Aldona (1999). "Arkivyskupas Mečislovas Reinys ir "T. Aškūnų bei B. Asių kolchozo Moderniojo Cirko biuleteniai"". Istorija (in Lithuanian). 42: 12–30. ISSN 2029-7181.
- Vasiliauskienė, Aldona (2013). "Lietuvių švietimo draugija "Rytas" 1939–1940 m." SOTER: Religijos mokslo žurnalas (in Lithuanian). 47 (75): 34–47. doi:10.7220/1392-7450.47(75).3. ISSN 1392-7450.
- ""Rytas"". Visuotinė lietuvių enciklopedija (in Lithuanian). Mokslo ir enciklopedijų leidybos centras. 10 August 2018 [2011].
