= Vilnius Vytautas Magnus Gymnasium =

High school in Vilnius, Lithuania

Coordinates: 54°40′40″N 25°17′25″E

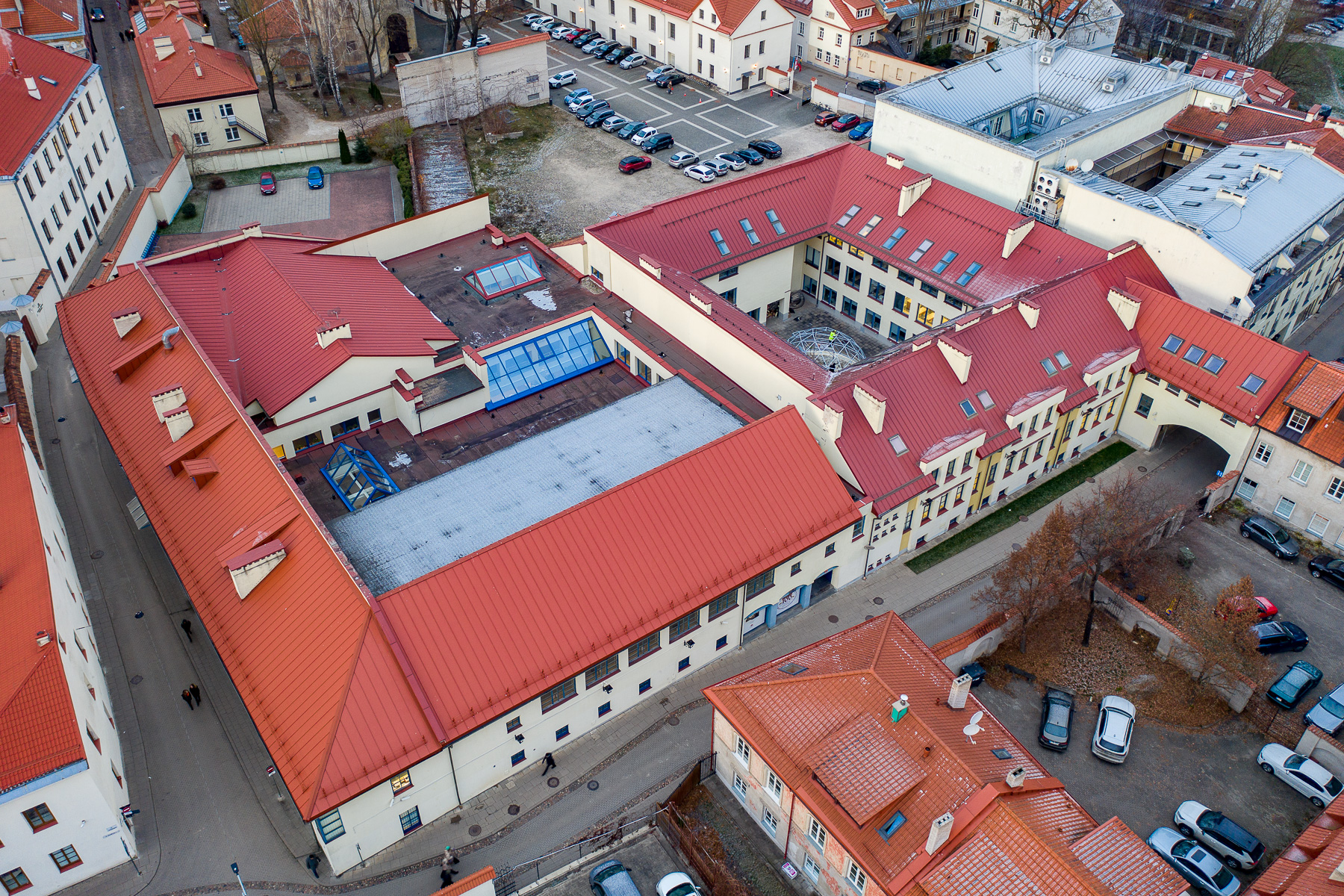
Vilnius Vytautas Magnus Gymnasium

Vilnius Vytautas Magnus Gymnasium (Lithuanian: Vilniaus Vytauto Didžiojo gimnazija) is a gymnasium (high school) in Vilnius, Lithuania. Established in 1915, it became the first Lithuanian-language high school in the city. During the interwar period, the school was one of the key Lithuanian institutions in Vilnius Region which was incorporated into the Second Polish Republic and claimed by Lithuania. Many prominent Lithuanians worked (including two future Presidents of Lithuania) and studied (including future Prime Minister) at the school.

== Names ==
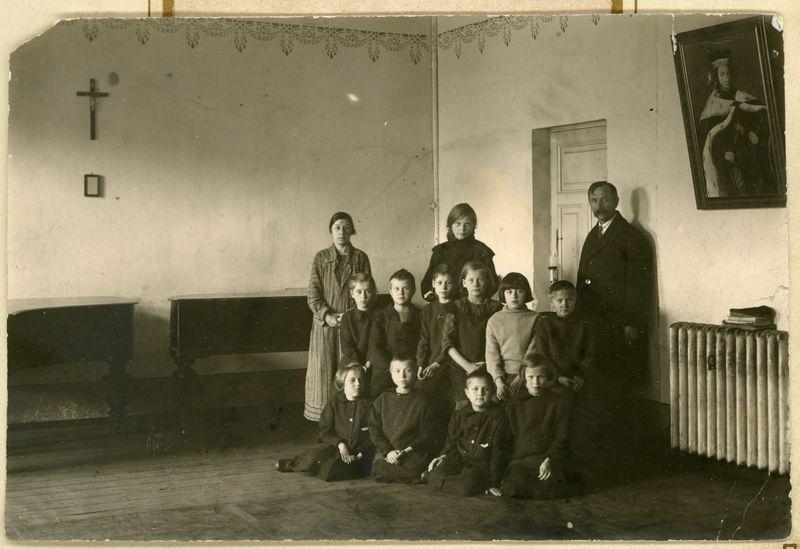
A group of students at the school sometime between 1921 and 1930. Portrait of Grand Duke Vytautas hangs on the wall.

The school was known under different names during its history:

- 1915: Lithuanian Gymnasium Courses of Jonas Basanavičiaus, Mykolas Biržiška and Povilas Gaidelionis (Jono Basanavičiaus, Mykolo Biržiškos ir Povilo Gaidelionio Vilniaus lietuvių gimnazijos kurso pamokos)
- 1915–1918: Lithuanian Gymnasium of Rytas Society ("Ryto" draugijos Vilniaus lietuvių gimnazija)
- 1918–1921: Vilnius 1st Men's Gymnasium (Vilniaus 1-oji vyrų gimnazija)
- 1921–1944: Vilnius Vytautas Magnus Gymnasium (Vilniaus Vytauto Didžiojo gimnazija)
- 1944–1949: Vilnius 1st Boys' Gymnasium (Vilniaus 1-ji berniukų gimnazija)
- 1949–1957: Vilnius 1st Secondary School (Vilniaus 1-oji vidurinė mokykla)
- 1957–2000: Vilnius Antanas Vienuolis Secondary School (Vilniaus Antano Vienuolio vidurinė mokykla)
- 2000–2005: Vilnius Antanas Vienuolis Gymnasium (Vilniaus Antano Vienuolio gimnazija)
- Since 2005: Vilnius Vytautas Magnus Gymnasium (Vilniaus Vytauto Didžiojo gimnazija)

== History ==
=== Establishment ===
Number of students and teachers
Year	Students	Teachers
1915	82	15
1916	144	15
1917	172	14
1918	320	21
1919	458	18
1920	504	23
1922	496	24
1923	533	23
1925	439	23
1928	366	
1930	341	28
1934	276	
1935	219	
1936	218	19
1941	428	
1942	496	
1944	377	23

Russian Empire implemented various Russification policies. After the Lithuanian press ban was lifted in 1905, Lithuanians were allowed to establish Lithuanian primary schools, but there were no Lithuanian high schools. Vilnius was captured by the German Imperial Army on 18 September 1915. The Lithuanian Society for the Relief of War Sufferers hurried to establish a gymnasium which was named after its official founders Jonas Basanavičius, Mykolas Biržiška, and Povilas Gaidelionis. The first teachers' meeting took place on 9 October and first lessons were held on 18 October 1915. At the time, the school had 47 students (30 boys and 17 girls) and 15 teachers. In December, Lithuanian Education Society Rytas took over the school and it became known as the Lithuanian Gymnasium of Rytas Society. Juozas Balčikonis Gymnasium in Panevėžys was established on 1 October 1915 clinching the title as the first Lithuanian gymnasium.

In 1918, as more Lithuanian refugees returned from Russia, the number of students grew to 320. In November 1918, administration of the school was transferred to the Lithuanian Ministry of Education. It was officially renamed as the First Men's Gymnasium (at the same time, a girls' gymnasium was organized by Ona Mašiotienė) and moved to spacious premises on Gediminas Avenue (former Vilnius Girls' Gymnasium, present-day Lithuanian Academy of Music and Theatre). When Lithuanian institutions evacuated to Kaunas at the start of the Lithuanian–Soviet War in January 1919, the school was again taken over by the Rytas Society. In March 1919, the first 11 students graduated from the school. The boys' and girls' gymnasiums were again merged into one in 1920. The number of students grew to 504 for the 1920/1921 school year.

=== Second Polish Republic ===
==== Relations with Polish authorities ====
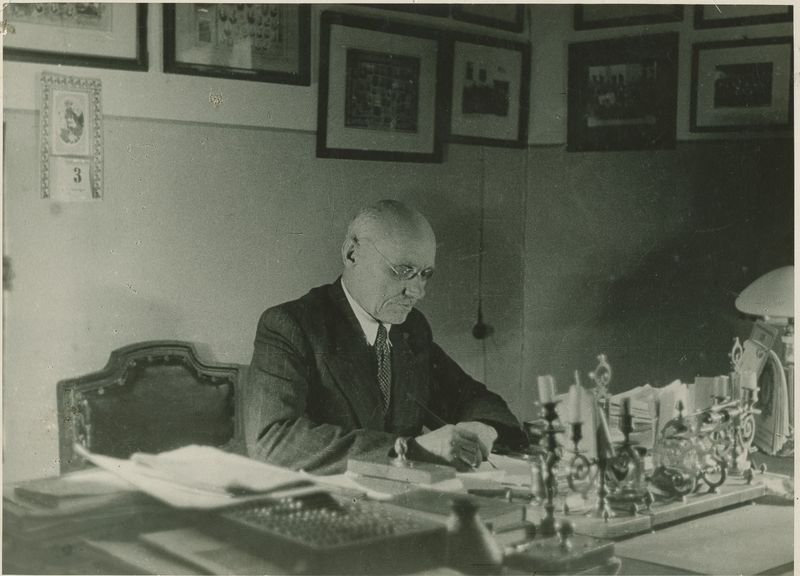
Gymnasium director Marcelinas Šikšnys in his office c. 1934

After the Żeligowski's Mutiny in October 1920, Vilnius Region was incorporated into the Republic of Central Lithuania and later the Second Polish Republic. Lithuania continued to claim Vilnius as its capital leading to a bitter diplomatic conflict with Poland. Lithuanian organizations remaining in the region faced increased scrutiny and restrictions from the Polish government. In August 1921, Polish authorities ordered the gymnasium to change its name and move out of the premises on Gediminas Avenue. In response, the school decided to adopt the name of Grand Duke Vytautas the Great (ruled 1392–1430) but refused to move out. On 1 October 1921, Polish police forcibly evicted the school. It struggled to find new premises. In December 1921, it rented 12 rooms which forced the school to hold classes in two shifts. The school moved to more spacious premises in 1930.

Only in 1925, the gymnasium was recognized as a state school. Without this recognition, gymnasium's diploma was not accepted by Polish universities. But even with this recognition, students had to take twice as many graduation exams as students of Polish gymnasiums. In total, students had to take 12 written and oral exams. The exams were graded not by the director of the gymnasium, but by an outsider. Linguist Jan Otrębski often served in this role and was known as a strict grader. As a result, for example, only half of the students successfully passed the graduation exams in 1933. Therefore, most students after graduation moved to independent Lithuania.

The lessons were taught in Lithuanian except for languages and subjects required to be taught in Polish. It was another cause for friction as Polish authorities demanded to teach general history and geography in Polish even though the Polish law required to teach history and geography of Poland in Polish.

The number of students gradually declined from 1923. This is attributed to the declining number of Lithuanian primary schools. Many such schools were maintained by the Lithuanian Education Society Rytas and faced increasingly strict requirements by the Polish government. Additionally, to be allowed to study at the gymnasium, students had to present a certificate that they spoke Lithuanian at home. Teachers were also subject to restrictions and annual approvals by the Polish government. On several occasions, teachers were arrested, deported to Lithuania, or forced out. For example, three teachers were arrested in November 1920. In 1922, school's director Mykolas Biržiška, three teachers, and school's doctor were deported in Lithuania. In 1933, six experienced teachers were forced out of their jobs; they were replaced by Lithuanian university students.

==== School activities ====
The school's curriculum focused on humanities and required Latin and either German or French languages. At the end of year, students had to take exams to determine if they could move up to the next year. Students who received at least one failing grade had to repeat the entire school year. In 1933, 72 students had to repeat the classes.

Lithuanian schools severely lacked Lithuanian-language textbooks. With support and funding from the Lithuanian Scientific Society, gymnasium's teachers were active in translating or writing new textbooks. In 1915–1925, they published 45 different textbooks. Biology teacher Motiejus Stankevičius was most active and prepared eight different textbooks.

Gymnasium students wore a school uniform and a hat with gymnasium's initials. The students were active and organized various music and theater performances, played sports, had a scouting group and a Catholic group Atžala. On several occasions, students performed for official delegations visiting from Kraków, Lviv, Silesia to showcase the culture of Vilnius Region. The school also emphasized religious education. Students participated in days-long Spiritual Exercises at the Church of Saint Nicholas and processions to Vilnius Calvary.

=== Lithuanian SSR and Lithuania ===
After Lithuania gained Vilnius in the aftermath of the Soviet–Lithuanian Mutual Assistance Treaty of October 1939, the school was divided into boys' and girls' gymnasiums. The girls' gymnasium was named after Grand Duchess Birutė (mother of Vytautas). In 1944, after Red Army captured Vilnius in the Operation Bagration, the schools were renamed to the 1st and the 2nd Gymnasiums dropping the historical reference from their names. The girls' gymnasium is now Vilnius Salomėja Nėris Gymnasium. In 1949, boys' gymnasium was reorganized into the 1st Vilnius Secondary School.

In December 1957, the school was named after writer Antanas Vienuolis. At the time, Soviet officials wanted to name the school after the Bolshevik revolutionary Felix Dzerzhinsky but school's teachers managed to convince the authorities to name the school after Vienuolis who died in August 1957. At the time, only two other schools in Vilnius were named after people (poet Salomėja Nėris and painter and composer Mikalojus Konstantinas Čiurlionis).

In 2005, the school was split into a primary school (progymnasium since 2015) named after Antanas Vienuolis and a gymnasium named after Grand Duke Vytautas thus restoring its historical name.

During the Soviet era, pre-1940 protocols of teachers' meetings were hidden by gymnasium's former director Juozas Naujalis. They were rediscovered in 1995 and published in 2011. In 2015, a monument to gymnasium's founders Jonas Basanavičius, Mykolas Biržiška, and Povilas Gaidelionis was built in the schoolyard.

In 2018, Vytautas Magnus Gymnasium had 605 students and 47 teachers. The number of students grew to 731 in 2021.

== People ==
=== Directors ===
School's directors were:

- 1915–1922: Mykolas Biržiška
- 1922–1939: Marcelinas Šikšnys
- 1940–1941: Bronius Untulis
- 1941–1944: Kazys Trukanas
- 1944–1945: Lionginas Vaitiekūnas
- 1945–1946: Henrikas Jonaitis
- 1946–1947: Jonas Mazelaitis
- 1948–1949: Juozas Naujalis
- 1949–1952: V. Vepštas
- 1952–1955: J. Rybačiauskas
- 1955–1959: V. Tumelis
- 1959–1960: A. Vaišys
- 1960–1972: V. Motiejūnas
- 1973–1973: J. Sidaugienė
- 1973–1980: A. Dziska
- 1980–1985: A. Petrauskas
- 1985–1993: J. Aliubavičienė
- 1993–2019: Danutė Bronė Puchovičienė
- Since 2020: Rytis Komičius

=== Notable teachers ===
Teacher	Subject	Years taught
Danielius Alseika	Nature, hygiene	1922–1924
Matas Bagdonas	Physics, math	1915–1918
Mykolas Biržiška	Lithuanian literature, history, geography	1915–1922
Vaclovas Biržiška	Physics, geography	1919–1920
Viktoras Biržiška	Physics, math	1920–1922
Bronislava Biržiškienė	Russian language, arithmetic, geography	1916–1922
Teodoras Brazys	Singing	1917–1918
Kristupas Čibiras	Religion, logic, psychology	From 1917
Povilas Gaidelionis	Lithuanian language, geography, physics, math	From 1915
Paulius Galaunė	Drawing	1919
Antanas Gylys	Russian language	1915
Pranas Gudynas	Drawing	
Henrikas Horodničius	Physics	
Augustinas Janulaitis	History, law	1918–1919
Ignas Jonynas	French language, history	1919–1920
Pranas Jucaitis	French language	1915
Juozas Kairiūkštis	Lithuanian language, cursive, arithmetic, Polish language	
Vytautas Kairiūkštis	Drawing	Since 1921
Povilas Karazija	Math	1922–1924
Kazys Kepalas	Latin	1915–1918
Antanas Krutulys	Singing	Since 1919
Vincas Martinkėnas	History	
Boleslovas Jonas Masiulis	Lithuanian language	1918
Stasys Matijošaitis	Lithuanian language	From 1919
Stasys Naginskas	Lithuanian language	1919–1922
Juozas Naujalis	Singing	1915–1917
Mečislovas Reinys	Religion, logic, psychology, law	1915–1922
Jonas Skruodys	Religion, history of Lithuania, history and geography of Poland	1920 and from 1922
Antanas Smetona	Greek language	1915–1916
Konstantinas Stašys	Chemistry	From 1922
Aleksandras Stulginskis	Nature	1915–1918
Konstantinas Šakenis	Physics	1918
Jonas Šepetys	Math	1922–1923
Jokūbas Šernas	History	1915–1918
Marcelinas Šikšnys	Math	From 1918
Jurgis Šlapelis	Lithuanian language	From 1922
Vincentas Taškūnas	Religion	1920–1922
Bronius Untulis	Latin, history	From 1919
Adomas Varnas	Drawing	1919–1920
Marija Varnienė	Gymnastics	1919–1920
Vincas (Bonaventūra) Zajančkauskas	Lithuanian language and literature, Latin	From 1921
Antanas Žmuidzinavičius	Drawing	1915–1918

=== Notable alumni ===
Notable people who have attended the school include:

- Audronius Ažubalis, Minister of Foreign Affairs
- Vytautas Bogušis, Member of the Seimas
- Vladas Drėma, art historian
- Pranė Dundulienė, ethnographer
- Kęstutis Glaveckas, Member of the Seimas
- Jurga Ivanauskaitė, writer
- Vytautas V. Landsbergis, writer
- Bronius Laurinavičius, priest
- Meilė Lukšienė, culture historian
- Aušra Maldeikienė, Member of the European Parliament
- Teodoras Medaiskis, Minister of Social Security and Labour
- Algimantas Mockus, film director and cinematographer
- Algimantas Nasvytis, architect
- Virgilijus Noreika, operatic tenor
- Vytautas Paukštė, actor
- Kazimira Prunskienė, Prime Minister
- Stasys Putvinskis, Minister of Agriculture
- Julius Sasnauskas, priest
- Šarūnas Sauka, painter
- Ramunė Šidlauskaitė-Venskūnienė, basketball player
- Gražutė Šlapelytė-Sirutienė, educator
- Margarita Starkevičiūtė, Member of the European Parliament
- Gintaras Steponavičius, Minister of Education and Science
- Julijonas Steponavičius, archbishop
- Algirdas Sysas, Member of the Seimas
- Auksė Treinytė, sport shooter
- Tomas Venclova, writer
- Arūnas Žebriūnas, film director
- Albinas Žukauskas, poet, writer

== Premises ==
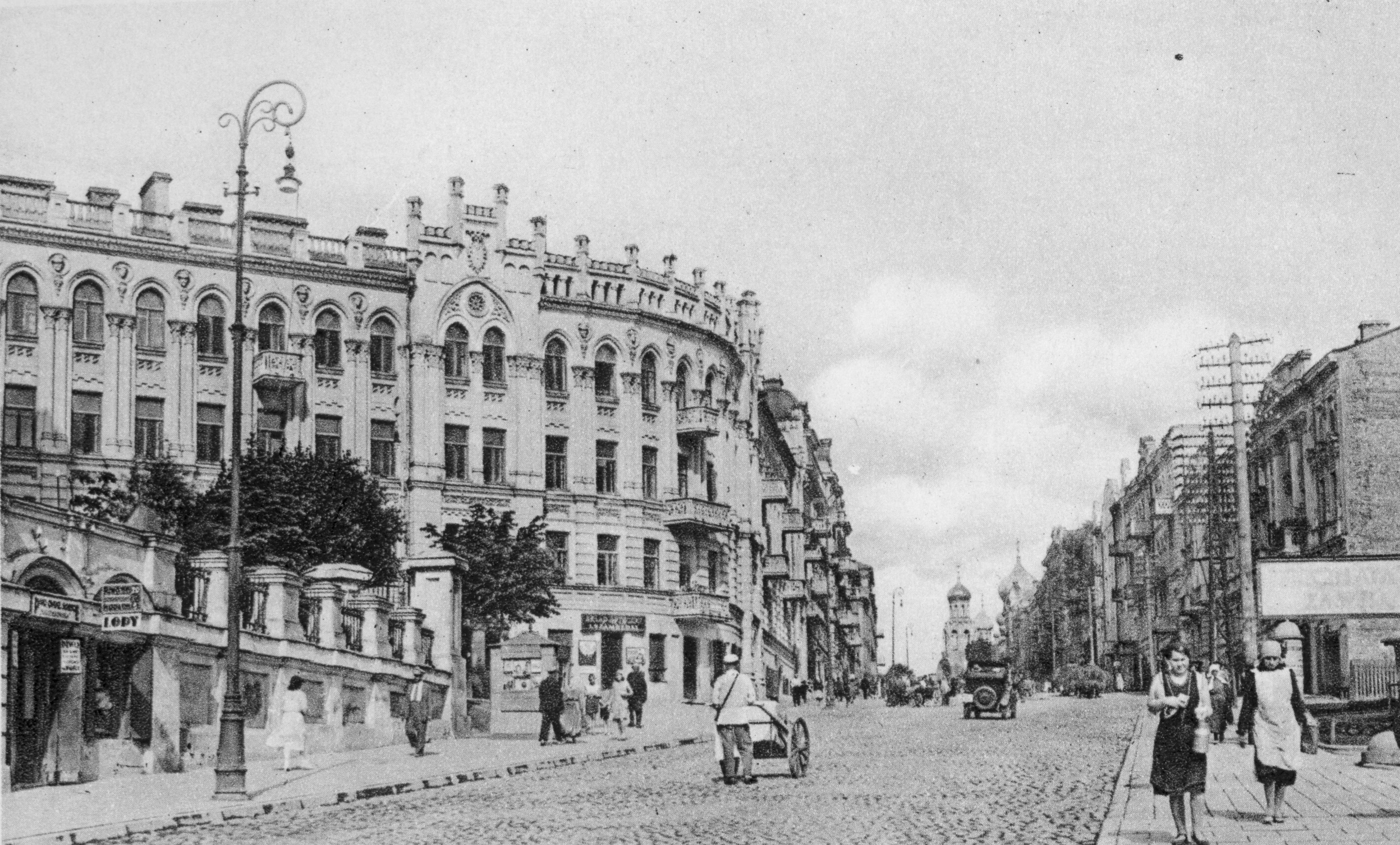
Building (on the left) where the school first opened in 1915

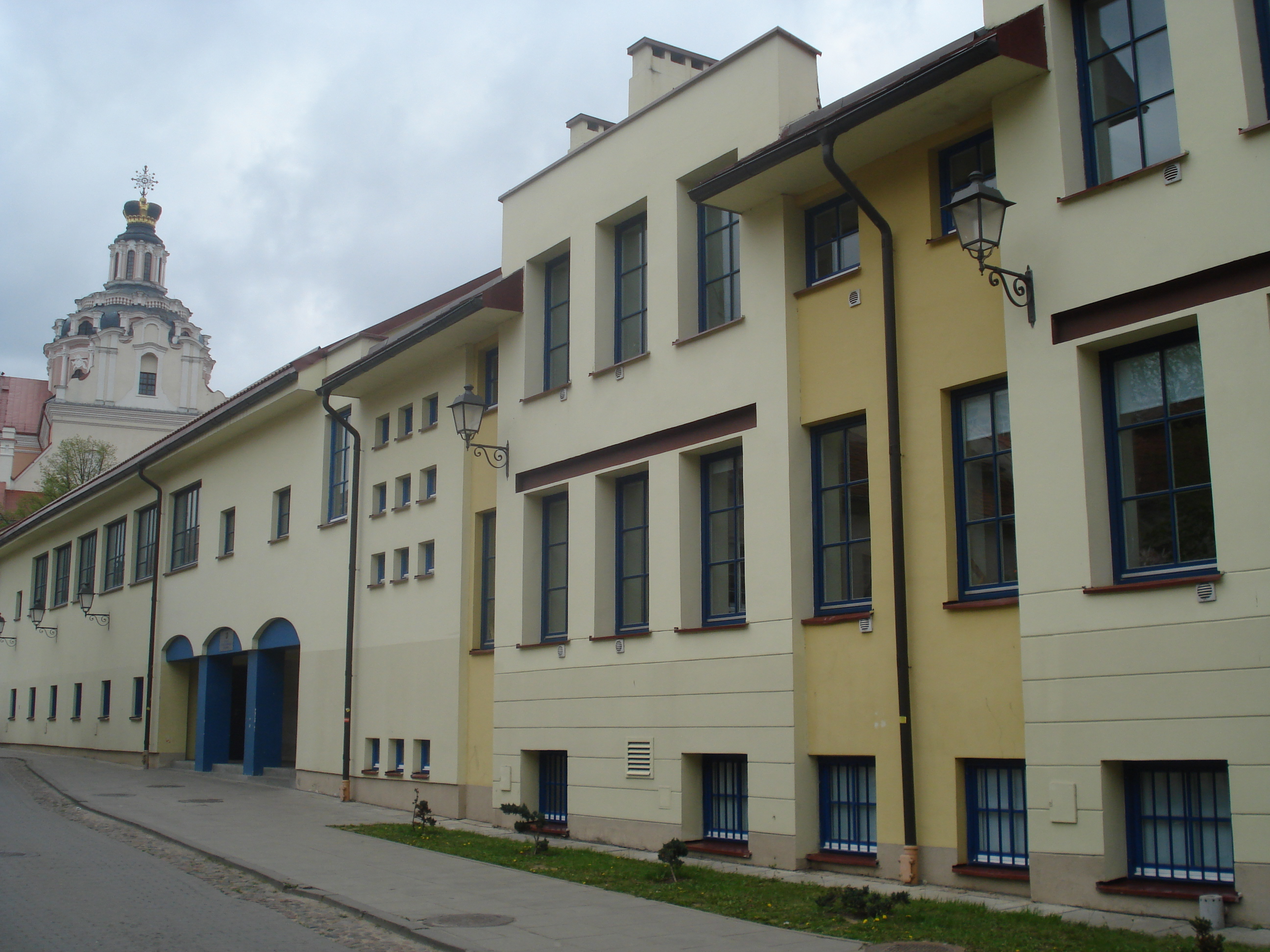
Present-day buildings of the gymnasium

During its history, the school was based in several locations in Vilnius Old Town:

- 1915: J.Basanavičiaus Street 16 (then Pohulianka Street 14/17)
- 1918: Gediminas Avenue 42 (then St. George Prospect 38; now Lithuanian Academy of Music and Theatre)
- 1921: Arklių Street 1 (then also used by a Jewish gymnasium)
- 1921: Šermukšnių Street 3 (then Philip Street 12)
- 1930: A. Jakšto Street 5 (then Dąbrowski Street 5)
- 1942: Didžioji Street 32 and Pamėnkalnis Street 11
- 1945: St. Ignatius Street 3
- 1946: Didžioji Street 32
- 1983: Aušros Vartų Street 23
- 2004: Augustijonų Street 8/10

== Bibliography ==
- BNS (8 September 2015). "Vilniuje statomas paminklas J. Basanavičiui, M. Biržiškai ir P. Gaidelioniui". Lrt.lt (in Lithuanian).
- Dumalakas, Arūnas (11 February 2015). "Lietuvoje seniausia gimnazija glumino drausme ir griežtumu" (in Lithuanian). Lietuvos rytas.
- ELTA (3 October 2005). "Vilniaus Vytauto Didžiojo gimnazija švęs 90 metų sukaktį". Delfi.lt (in Lithuanian).
- Ereminas, Gintautas (2015). "Lietuvių švietimas Vilniaus krašte 1920–1939 m." Gimtasai kraštas (in Lithuanian). I: 18–34. ISSN 2029-0101.
- Gudaitė, Jūratė (2019). Lietuvių tautinis atgimimas ir švietimas Vilniaus krašte (PDF) (in Lithuanian). Vol. 2. Vilnius: Lietuvos nacionalinis muziejus. ISBN 978-609-478-026-4.
- Klimka, Libertas (2011). "Vilniaus Vytauto Didžiojo gimnazijos įkūrimo aplinkybės ir pirmieji jos dešimtmečiai" (PDF). In Bronė Puchovičienė, Danutė; Raščiuvienė, Irena; Zabarskaitė, Jolanta (eds.). Vilniaus Vytauto Didžiojo gimnazijos protokolai: (1915–1940 ir 1953–1955 metai) (in Lithuanian). Vilnius: Europos kalbų ir kultūrų dialogo tyrėjų asociacija. pp. 25–42. ISBN 9786094201783.
- Liekis, Algimantas (2011). Juodieji Lietuvos istorijos puslapiai (PDF) (in Lithuanian). Vol. II. Mokslotyros institutas. ISBN 978-9986-795-67-4. Archived from the original (PDF) on 2022-10-16.
- Stravinskienė, Vitalija (2015). "Lietuviškos mokyklos Vilniuje 1920–1939 m." (PDF). Istorija (in Lithuanian). 99 (3): 34–51. ISSN 1392-0456.
- Subačius, Kęstutis (13 December 2022). "Vilniaus Antano Vienuolio mokykla – galbūt daugiausia Lietuvai nusipelniusių žmonių išugdžiusi mokykla". 15min.lt (in Lithuanian).
- Urbonaitė-Vainienė, Ieva (15 June 2015). "Kartą ir visiems laikams: kuri Lietuvos mokykla – iš tiesų Nr.1". Delfi.lt (in Lithuanian).
