= Daugailiai =

- Town
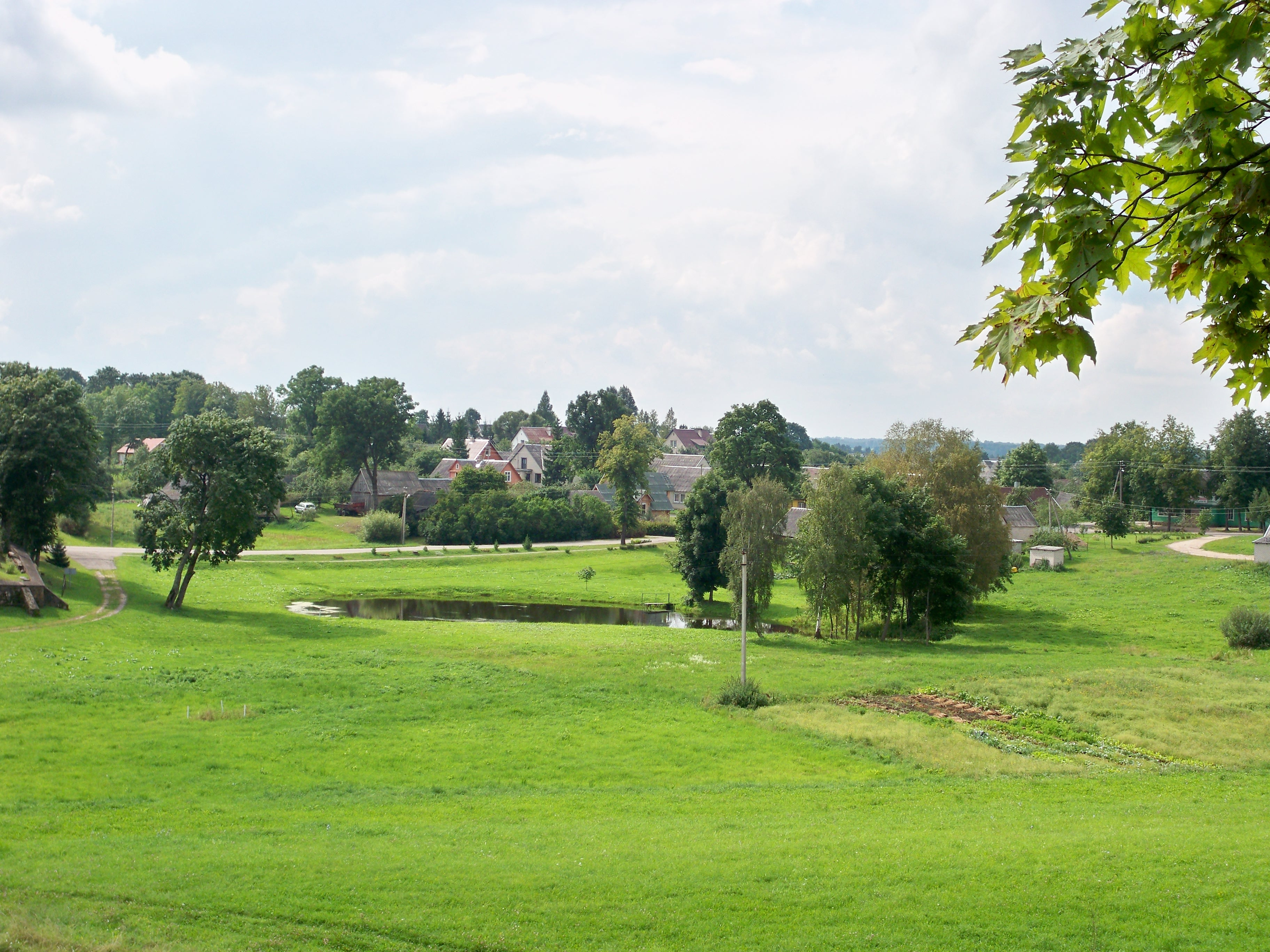

- Coat of arms

- Location within Lithuania
- Coordinates: 55°35′20″N 25°50′10″E
- Country: Lithuania
- County: Utena County
- Municipality: Utena district municipality
- Eldership: Daugailiai eldership

Population (2011)
  - Total: 325
- Time zone: UTC+2 (EET)
  - Summer (DST): UTC+3 (EEST)

Daugailiai ['daːugaɪlʲɪaɪ] (Polish: Daugiele) is a town in Utena County, Lithuania. According to the 2011 census, the town has a population of 325 people.

== Gallery ==
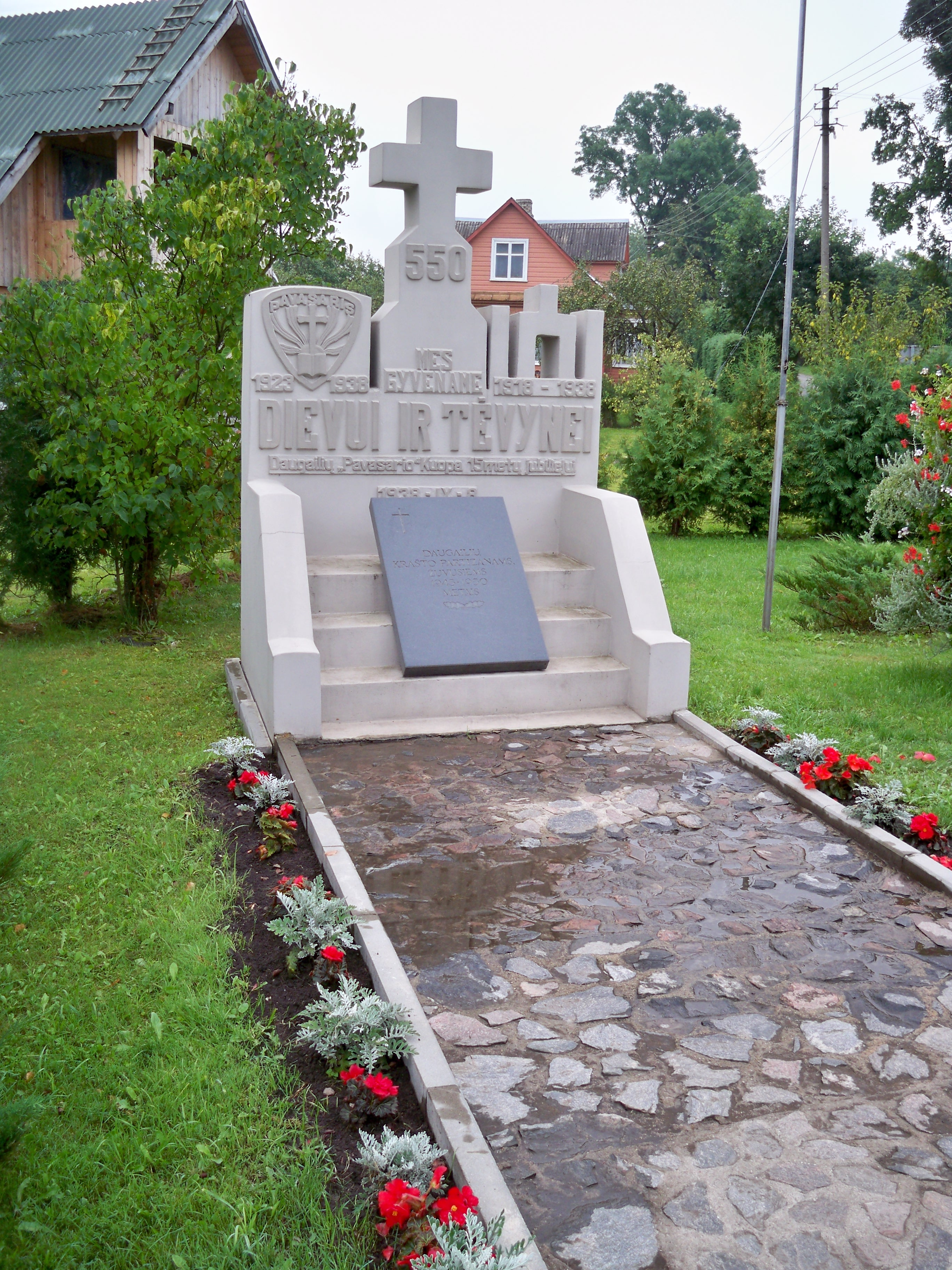
Forest Brothers Monument

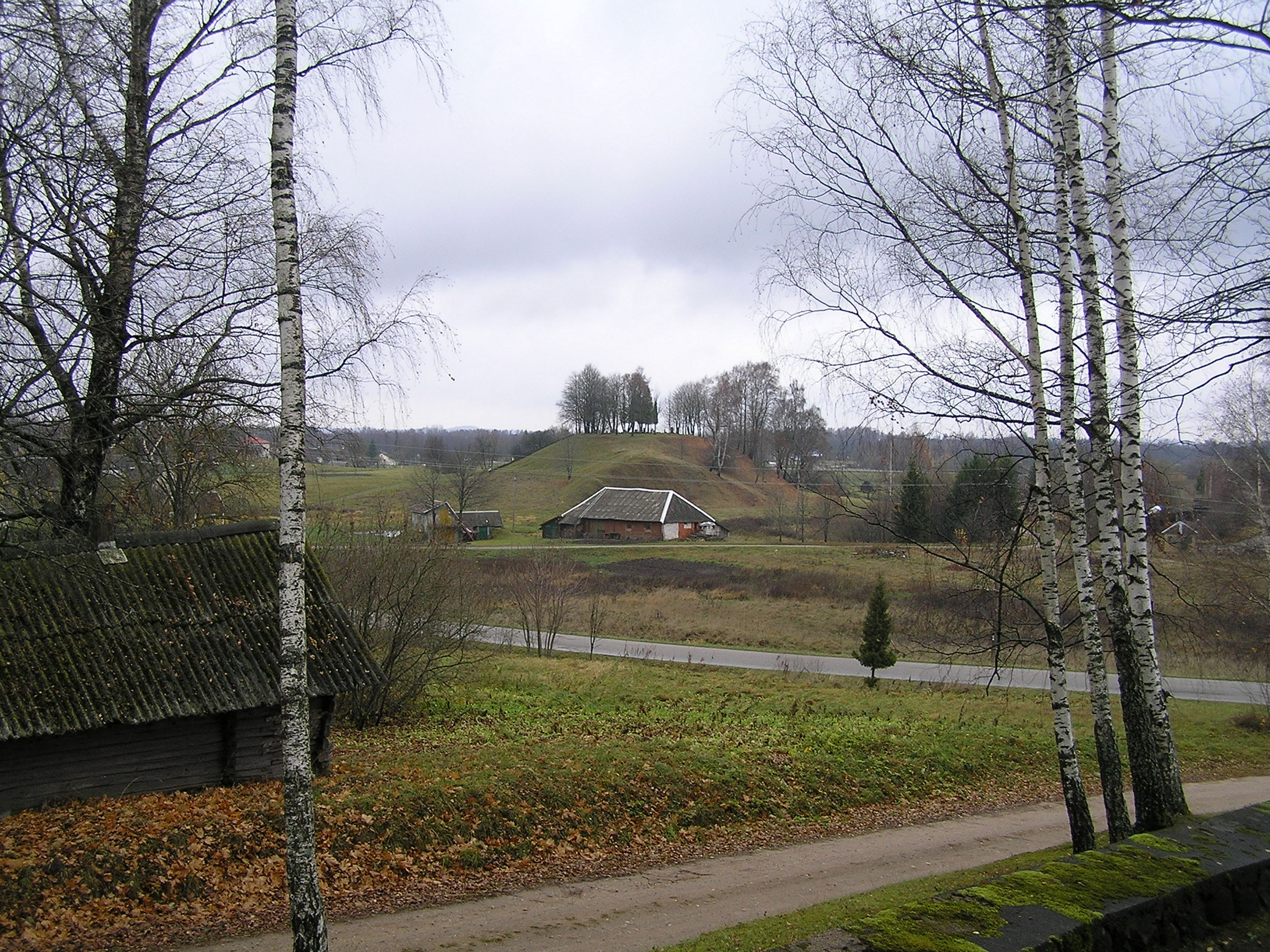
Daugailiai mound
