= Church of Saint Nicholas, Vilnius =

The Church of Saint Nicholas
- Šv. Mikalojaus bažnyčia
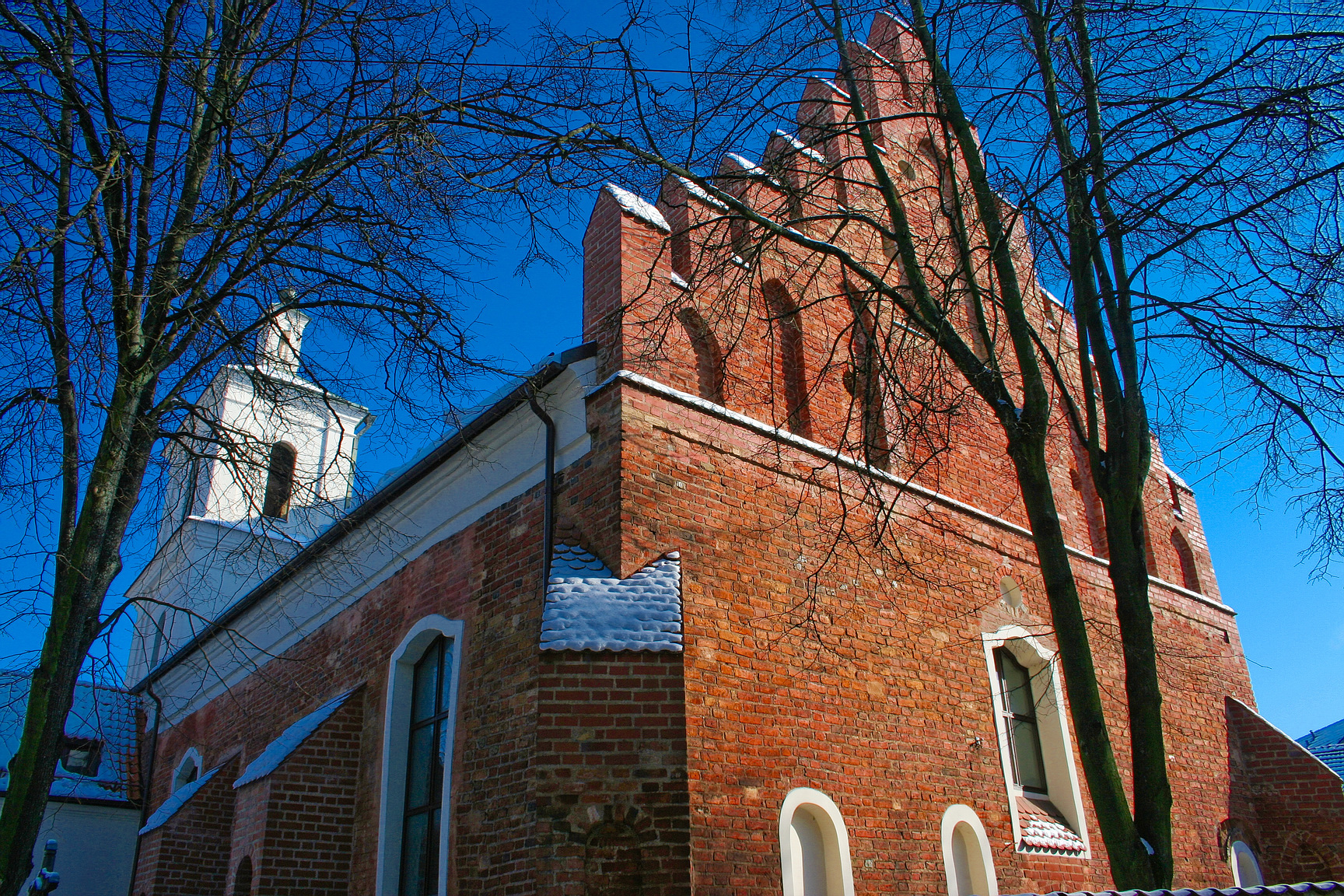
- St. Nicholas Church
- The Church of Saint Nicholas
- 54°40′42″N 25°16′58″E
- Country: Lithuania
- Denomination: Roman Catholic
- Website: mikalojus.lt

History
- Status: Active
- Founded: Before 1387

Architecture
- Functional status: Church
- Architectural type: Church
- Style: Gothic architecture

Administration
- Archdiocese: Vilnius

Clergy
- Archbishop: Gintaras Grušas

Saint Nicholas Church (Lithuanian: Šv. Mikalojaus bažnyčia) is the oldest surviving church in Lithuania, built in the Old Town of the capital city Vilnius.

== History ==
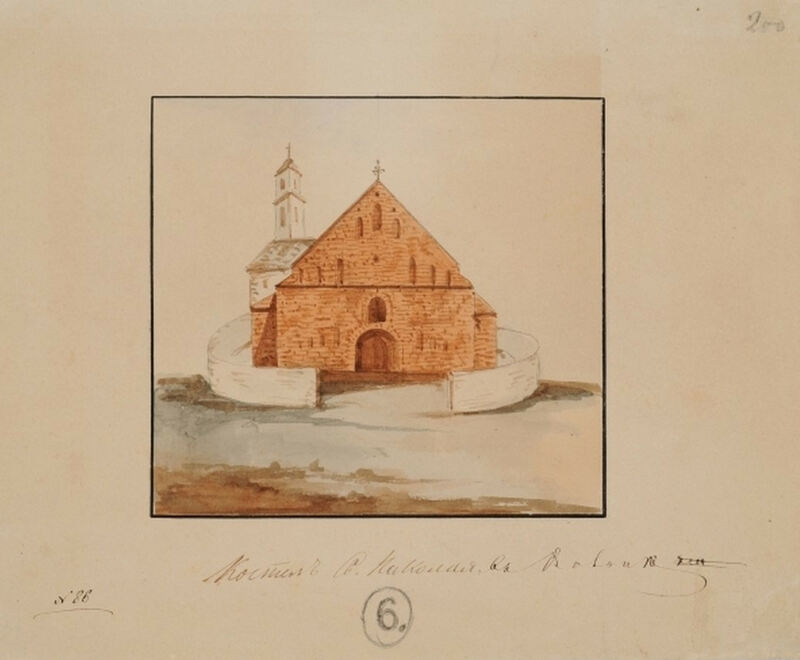
Church of Saint Nicholas in 1830 by Marcelis Januškevičius

Originally built in the 14th century, the church is mentioned in writing for the first time in 1387. The church was a center for German craftsmen and merchants housed along the Vokiečių gatvė (German street).

In 1901-39 the Church of St. Nicholas was the only church in Vilnius where the mass was held in Lithuanian. By the same token it was a centre of Lithuanian culture (its famous dean Kristupas Čibiras was killed in 1942 during a bombing raid).

In the 1920s to 1940s, sermons in Belarusian language were also held in the church by famous priests including Adam Stankievič, Vincent Hadleŭski, Jazep Hiermanovič, Kazimir Svajak.

After the World War II, the Cathedral of Vilnius was closed and the Curia of the Archdiocese of Vilnius was moved to the St. Nicholas Parish building and the Church of St. Nicholas in fact performed the functions of a cathedral.

During the Soviet occupation a statue of the patron of Vilnius, St. Christopher, was erected in the church orchard (sculptor Antanas Kmieliauskas, 1959); it was an obvious act of resistance, as the city's coat-of-arms with St. Christopher's figure was banned at that time.

== Architecture ==
Archaeologists believe that the same Roman Catholic church survived till the present day. Externally, the church represents the Brick Gothic style, while its interior has been renovated several times. The church belfry was built in the 17th century in the Baroque style. Its façade is flanked by two stocky buttresses with cut-off tops. The triangular pediment with niches has been recently renovated accentuating its original Gothic character. In the interior, four elegant octahedral pillars support web and star vaults. The high altar holds a painting of St. Nicholas with a silver setting from the 16th century. The church is adorned with two sculptures: a polychrome statue of St. Louis from the Gothic period, and Vytautas' bronze bust erected in 1930 (sculptor Rapolas Jakimavičius).

== Gallery ==
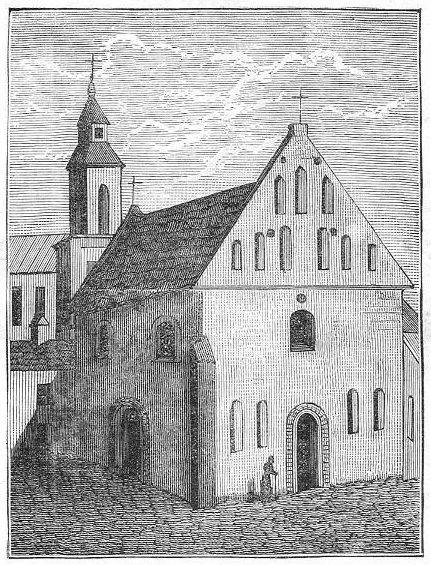
Church of Saint Nicholas in 1876

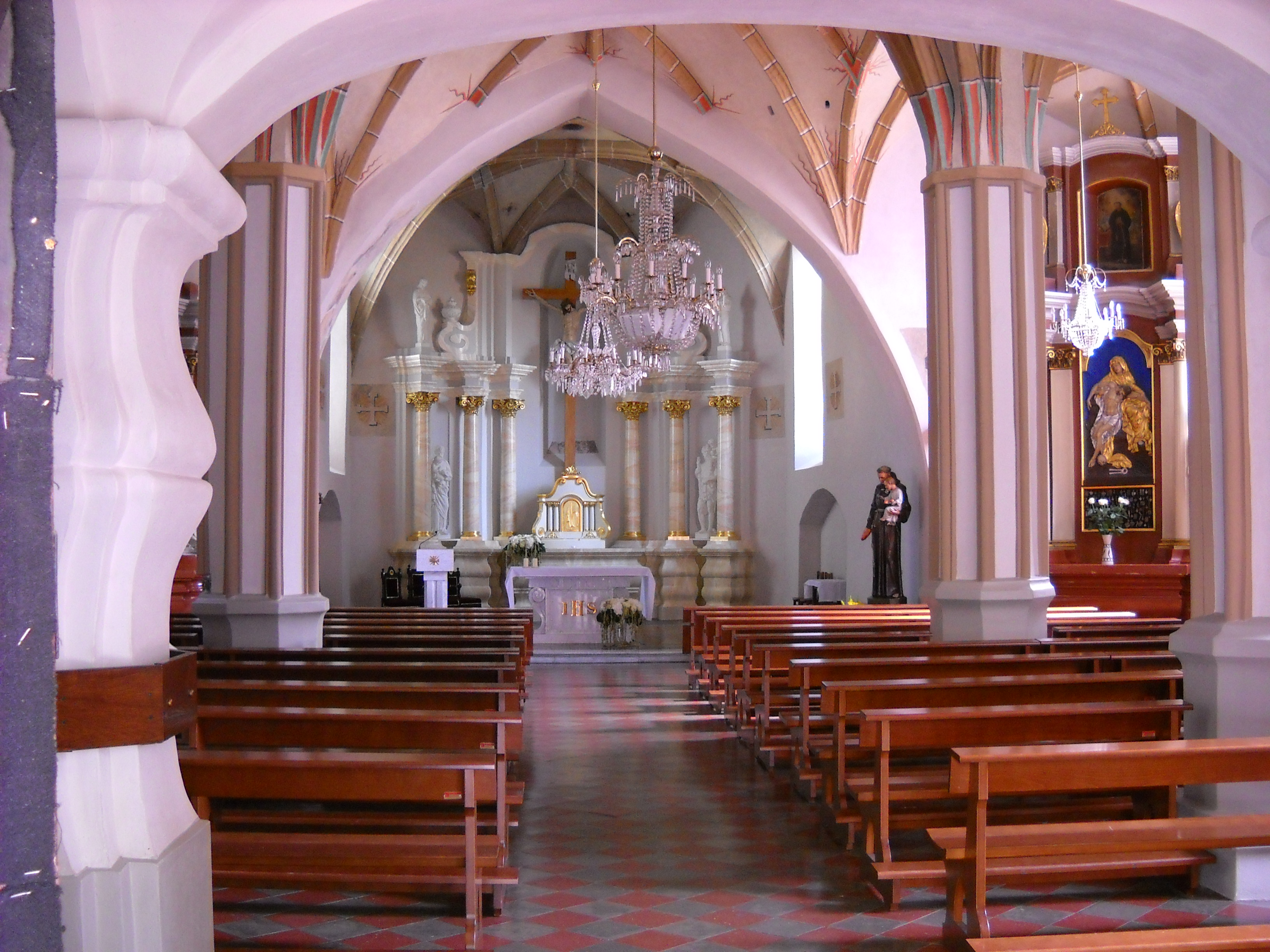
Main altar

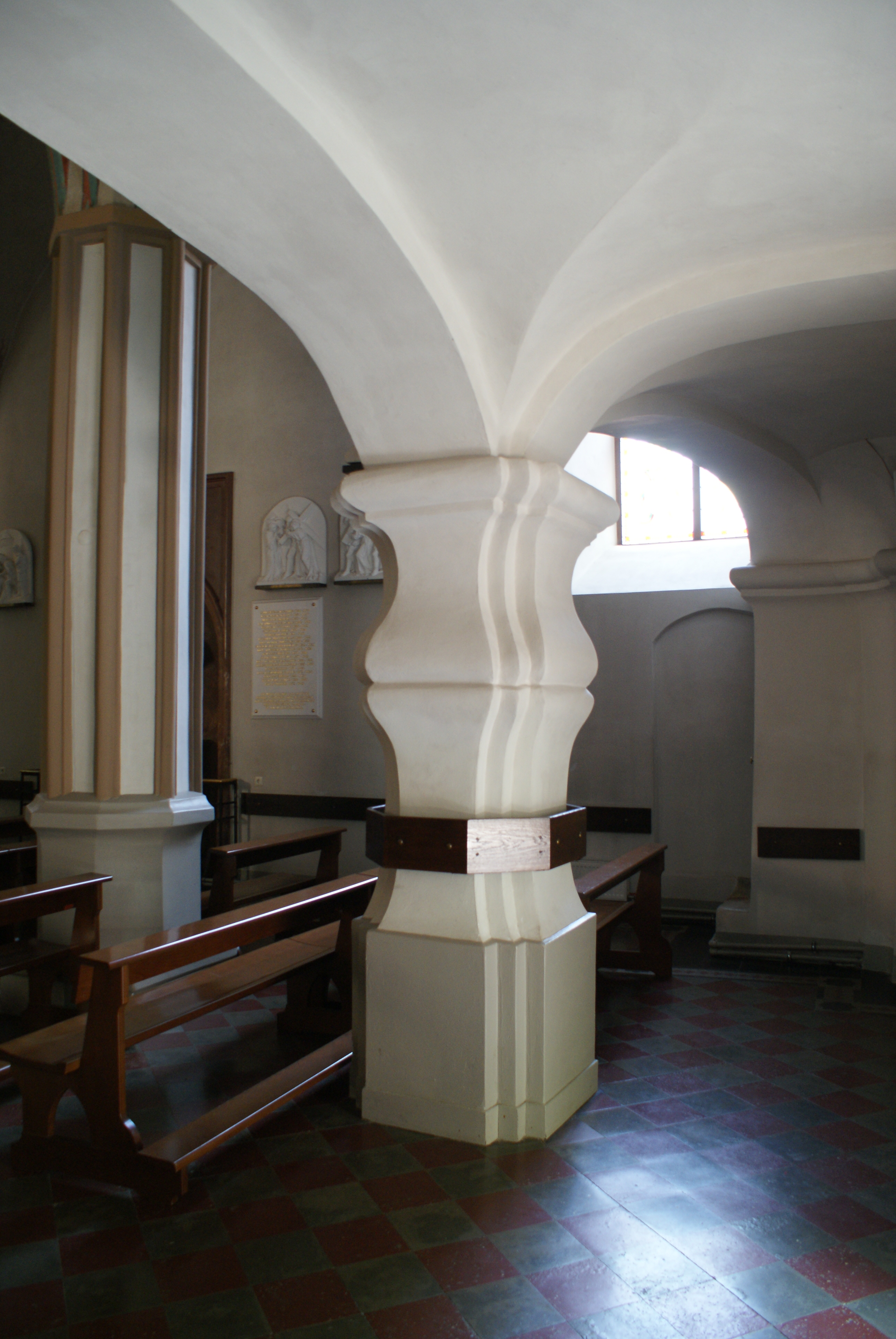
Interior fragment

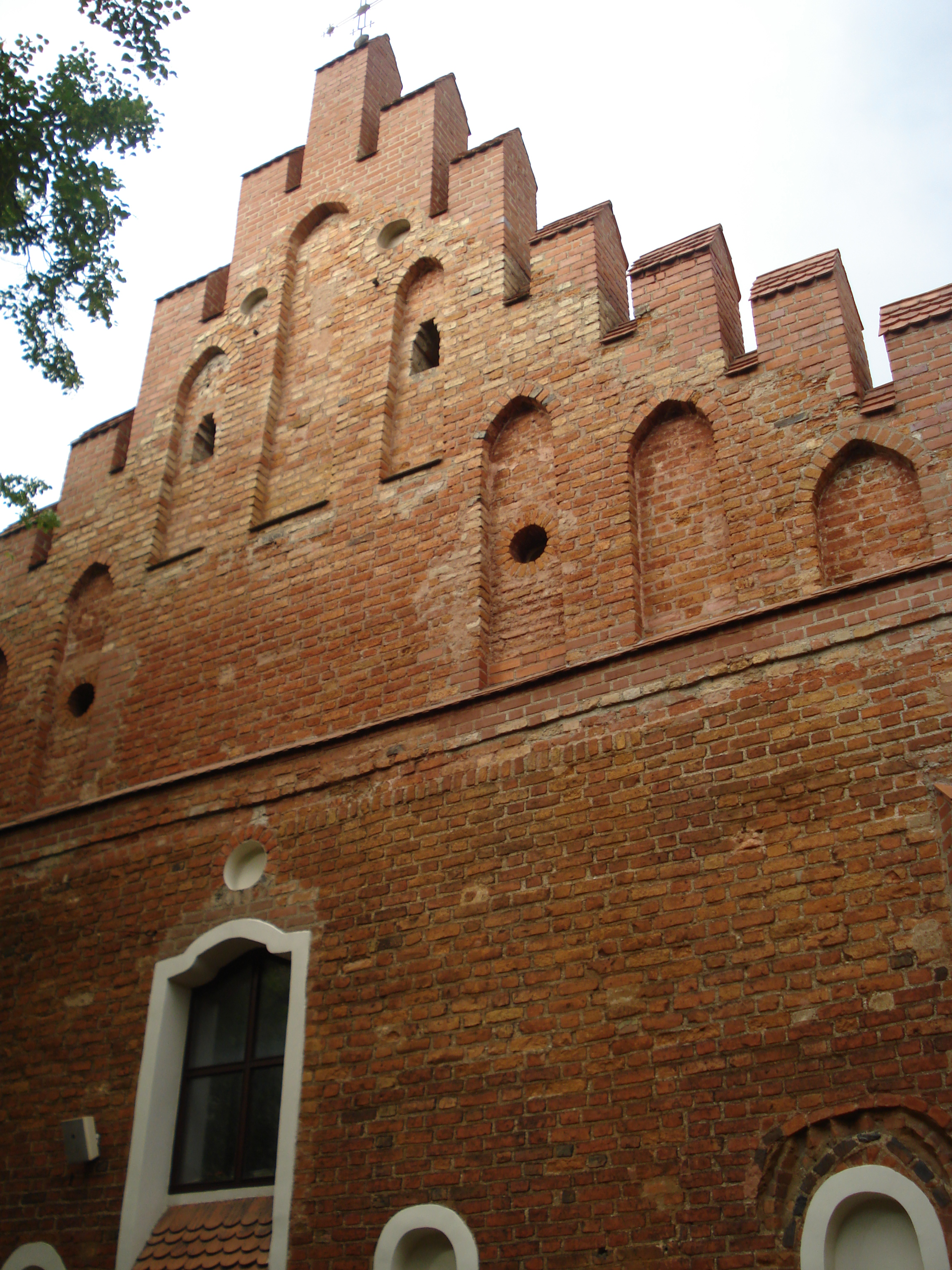
Exterior

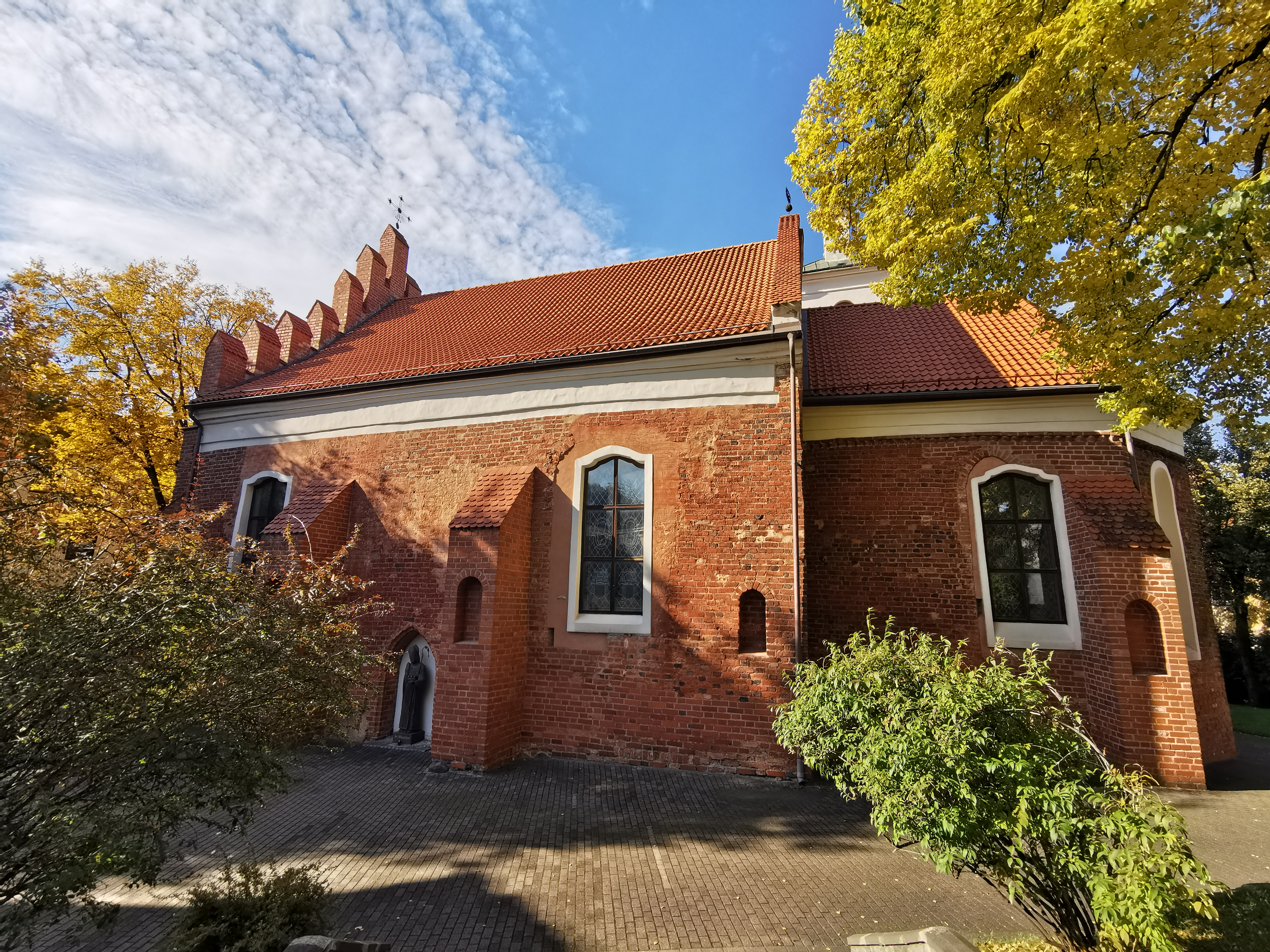
Side view of the exterior

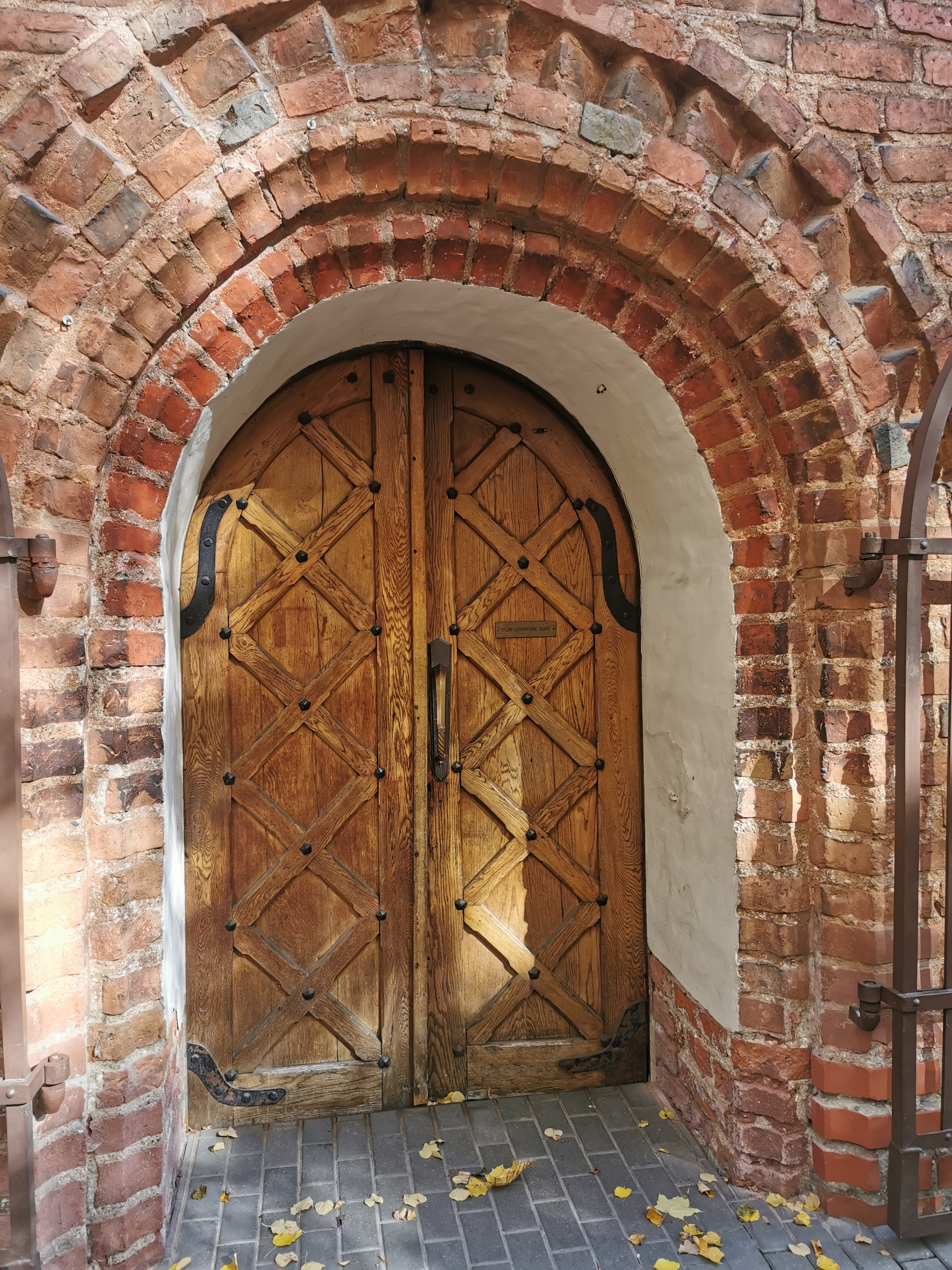
Main entrance doors

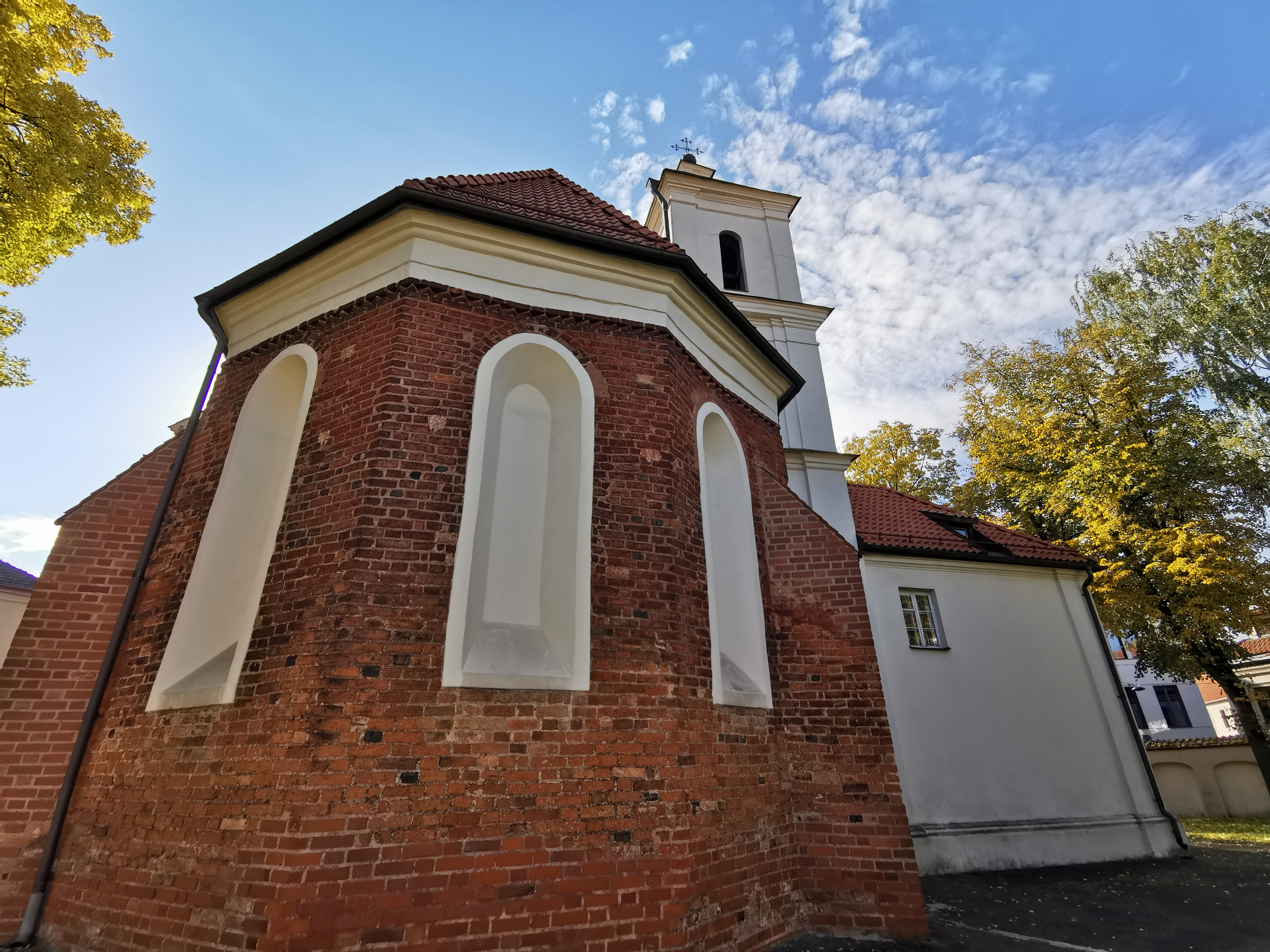
Apse of the church
