= List of churches in Vilnius =

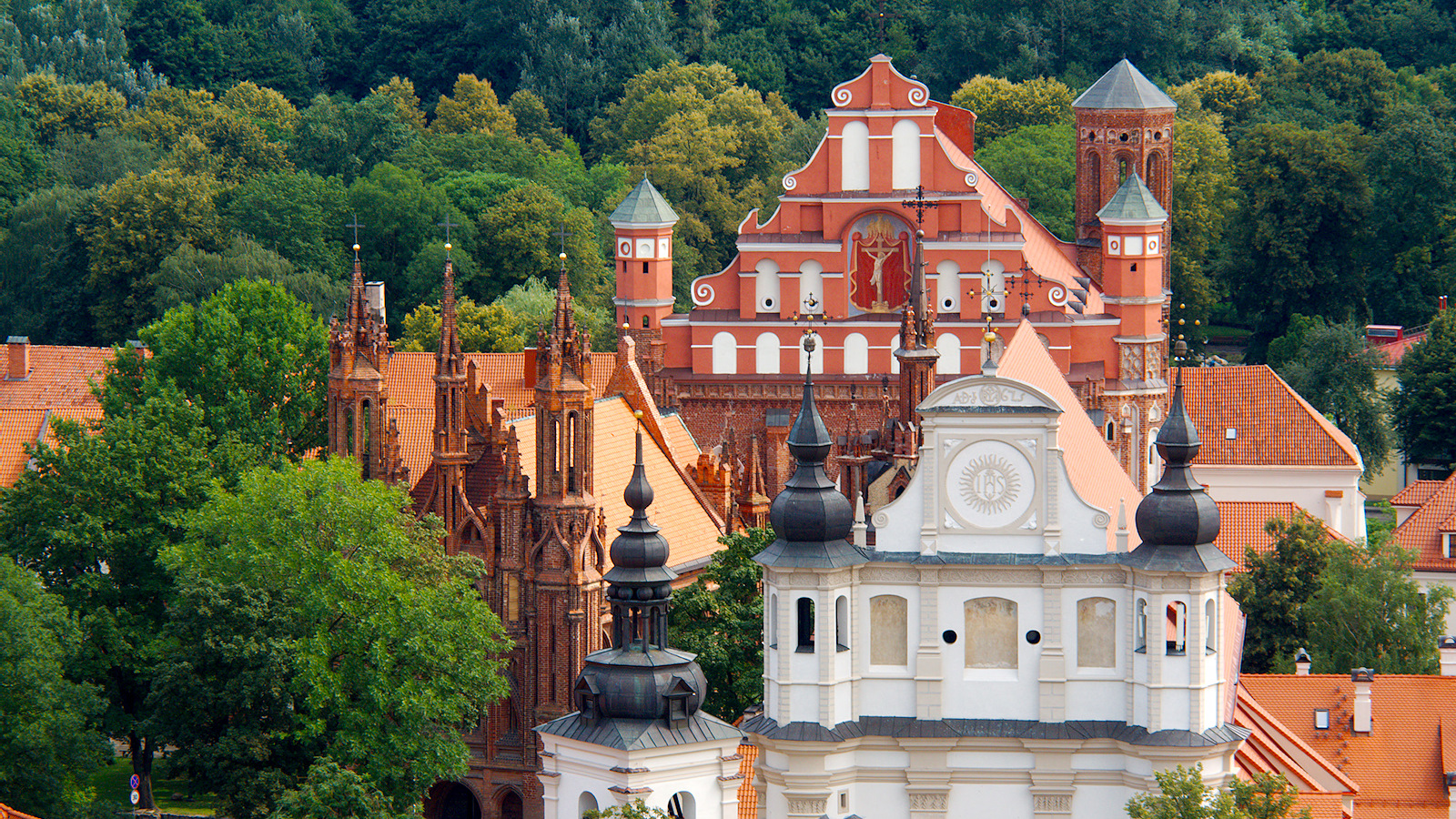

List of churches in Vilnius, Lithuania, includes existing places of worship – churches, synagogues, kenesas – even if they are no longer used for religious purposes.

== List ==
=== Catholic ===
| Image | Name | Lithuanian name | Denomination | Date of Construction | Location |
|---|---|---|---|---|---|
| | Cathedral Basilica of St. Stanislaus and St. Ladislaus (Vilnius Cathedral) | Šv. Stanislovo ir Šv. Vladislovo arkikatedra bazilika | Roman Catholic | 1783 | 54°41′10″N 25°17′16″E |
| | Church of All Saints | Visų Šventųjų bažnyčia | Roman Catholic (Carmelites) | 1630 | 54°40′32″N 25°17′4″E |
| | Church of the Ascension | Viešpaties Dangun Žengimo bažnyčia | Roman Catholic (Vincentians) | 1730 | 54°40′36″N 25°17′46″E |
| | Church of the Assumption of the Blessed Virgin Mary | Švč. M. Marijos Ėmimo į dangų bažnyčia | Roman Catholic (Franciscans) | 1421 | 54°40′46″N 25°16′50″E |
| | Church of Blessed Jurgis Matulaitis | Palaimintojo Jurgio Matulaičio bažnyčia | Roman Catholic | 1996 | 54°40′49″N 25°17′51″E |
| | Church of the Blessed Virgin Mary of Consolation, Vilnius | Švč. Mergelės Marijos Ramintojos bažnyčia | Roman Catholic (Augustinians) | 1768 | 54°40′45″N 25°17′25″E |
| | Church of the Blessed Virgin Mary, Queen of Peace, Naujoji Vilnia | Švč. M. Marijos, Taikos Karalienės bažnyčia | Roman Catholic | 2002 | 54°41′5″N 25°24′44″E |
| | Church of Christ the King and Infant Jesus, Pavilnys | Kristaus Karaliaus ir Šv. Kūdikėlio Jėzaus bažnyčia | Roman Catholic | 1935 | 54°40′23″N 25°21′27″E |
| | Church of the Discovery of the Holy Cross, Vilnius | Šv. Kryžiaus Atradimo bažnyčia | Roman Catholic (Dominicans) | 1700 | 54°44′26″N 25°16′48″E |
| | Church of the Holy Cross, Vilnius | Šv. Kryžiaus bažnyčia | Roman Catholic (Fatebenefratelli) | 1543 (chapel), 1725 (towers) | 54°41′2″N 25°17′6″E |
| | Church of the Holy Spirit, Vilnius | Šventosios Dvasios bažnyčia | Roman Catholic (Dominicans) | ~1408 | 54°40′53″N 25°17′4″E |
| | Church of the Holy Trinity, Trinapolis | Švč. Trejybės bažnyčia | Roman Catholic (Trinitarians) | 1721 (chapel), 1772 (towers) | 54°43′52″N 25°17′28″E |
| | Church of the Holy Trinity, Vilnius | Švč. Trejybės bažnyčia | Greek Catholic (Basilians) | 1514 | 54°40′31″N 25°17′18″E |
| | Church of the Immaculate Conception of the Blessed Virgin Mary, Žvėrynas | Švč. Mergelės Marijos Nekaltojo Prasidėjimo bažnyčia | Roman Catholic | 1925 | 54°41′54″N 25°15′10″E |
| | Church of Jesus the Redeemer, Vilnius | Išganytojo bažnyčia | Roman Catholic (Trinitarians) | 1717 | 54°42′2″N 25°18′45″E |
| | Church of the Providence of God, Vilnius | Dievo Apvaizdos bažnyčia | Roman Catholic (Salesians) | 1913 | 54°40′10″N 25°14′41″E |
| | Church of the Sacred Heart of Jesus, Vilnius | Švč. Jėzaus Širdies bažnyčia | Roman Catholic (Visitandines) | 1756 | 54°40′33″N 25°17′51″E |
| | Church of St. Anne, Vilnius | Šv. Onos bažnyčia | Roman Catholic | 1500 | 54°41′00″N 25°17′35″E |
| | Church of St. Bartholomew the Apostle, Vilnius | Šv. apaštalo Baltramiejaus bažnyčia | Roman Catholic | 1824 | 54°40′49″N 25°17′51″E |
| | Church of St. Casimir, Naujoji Vilnia | Šv. Kazimiero bažnyčia | Roman Catholic | 1911 | 54°41′50″N 25°24′38″E |
| | Church of St. Casimir, Vilnius | Šv. Kazimiero bažnyčia | Roman Catholic (Jesuits) | 1618 | 54°40′40″N 25°17′19″E |
| | Church of St. Catherine, Vilnius | Šv. Kotrynos bažnyčia | Roman Catholic (Benedictines) | 1625 | 54°40′55″N 25°16′52″E |
| | Church of St. Francis and St. Bernard, Vilnius | Šv. Pranciškaus Asyžiečio ir Šv. Bernardino bažnyčia | Roman Catholic (Bernardines) | Late 15th century | 54°41′00″N 25°17′38″E |
| | Church of St. George, Vilnius | Šv. Jurgio bažnyčia | Roman Catholic (Carmelites) | 1765 | 54°41′15″N 25°16′57″E |
| | Church of St. Ignatius of Loyola, Vilnius | Šv. Ignoto bažnyčia | Roman Catholic (Jesuits) | 1622-1647 | 54°40′58″N 25°16′56″E |
| | Church of St. John Bosco, Vilnius | Šv. Jono Bosko bažnyčia | Roman Catholic | 2001 | 54°40′44″N 25°12′39″E |
| | Church of St. Johns, Vilnius | Šv. Jonų bažnyčia | Roman Catholic (Jesuits) | 1426 | 54°40′58″N 25°17′19″E |
| | Church of St. Michael the Archangel, Vilnius | Šv. arkangelo Mykolo bažnyčia | Roman Catholic (Bernardines) | 1594 | 54°40′58″N 25°17′32″E |
| | Church of St. Nicholas, Vilnius | Šv. Mikalojaus bažnyčia | Roman Catholic | 14th century | 54°40′42″N 25°16′58″E |
| | Church of St. Peter and St. Paul, Vilnius | Šv. apaštalų Petro ir Povilo bažnyčia | Roman Catholic (Laterans) | 1701 | 54°41′39″N 25°18′23″E |
| | Church of St. Philip and St. Jacob, Vilnius | Šv. apaštalų Pilypo ir Jokūbo bažnyčia | Roman Catholic (Dominicans) | 1722 | 54°41′27″N 25°16′19″E |
| | Church of St. Raphael the Archangel, Vilnius | Šv. arkangelo Rapolo bažnyčia | Roman Catholic (Jesuits) | 1709 | 54°41′34″N 25°16′44″E |
| | Church of St. Theresa, Vilnius | Šv. Teresės bažnyčia | Roman Catholic (Carmelites) | 1650 | 54°40′30″N 25°17′22″E |
| | Church of St. Stephen, Vilnius | Šv. diakono Stepono bažnyčia | Roman Catholic (Brotherhood of Saint Roch) | 1612 | 54°40′10″N 25°16′35″E |
| | Sanctuary of the Divine Mercy, Vilnius | Dievo Gailestingumo šventovė | Roman Catholic | 15th century | 54°40′53″N 25°17′8″E |

=== Eastern Orthodox ===
| Image | Name | Lithuanian name | Denomination | Date of Construction | Location |
|---|---|---|---|---|---|
| | Cathedral of the Theotokos | Dievo Motinos Ėmimo į Dangų katedra | Eastern Orthodox | 1348 | 54°40′52″N 25°17′33″E |
| | Church of the Holy Spirit, Vilnius | Šv. Dvasios cerkvė | Eastern Orthodox | 1753 | 54°40′32″N 25°17′27″E |
| | Church of Our Lady of the Sign, Vilnius | Dievo Motinos ikonos „Ženklas iš dangaus“ cerkvė | Eastern Orthodox | 1903 | 54°41′27″N 25°15′26″E |
| | Church of St. Alexander Nevsky, Vilnius | Šv. Aleksandro Neviškio cerkvė | Eastern Orthodox | 1898 | 54°39′57″N 25°17′13″E |
| | Church of St. Catherine the Martyr, Vilnius | Šv. kankinės Kotrynos cerkvė | Eastern Orthodox | 1872 | 54°41′33″N 25°14′41″E |
| | Church of St. Constantine and St. Michael | Šv. Konstantino ir Michailo cerkvė | Eastern Orthodox | 1913 | 54°40′56″N 25°16′6″E |
| | Church of St. Euphrosyne of Polotsk | Šv. Eufrosinijos Polockietės cerkvė | Eastern Orthodox | 1838 | 54°39′54″N 25°17′47″E |
| | Church of St. Michael the Archangel, Vilnius | Šv. arkangelo Mykolo cerkvė | Eastern Orthodox | 1895 | 54°42′6″N 25°17′2″E |
| | Church of St. Nicholas, Lukiškės | Šv. Nikolajaus cerkvė | Eastern Orthodox | 1904 | 54°41′32″N 25°16′1″E |
| | Church of St. Nicholas, Vilnius | Šv. Nikolajaus cerkvė | Eastern Orthodox | 1740 | 54°40′48″N 25°17′19″E |
| | Church of St. Paraskeva, Vilnius | Šv. kankinės Paraskevos cerkvė | Eastern Orthodox | 1560 | 54°40′51″N 25°17′21″E |
| | Church of St. Peter and St. Paul, Naujoji Vilnia | Šv. apaštalų Petro ir Povilo cerkvė | Eastern Orthodox | 1908 | 54°41′43″N 25°23′52″E |

=== Old Believers, Protestants, Jews and Karaites ===
| Image | Name | Lithuanian name | Denomination | Date of Construction | Location |
|---|---|---|---|---|---|
| | Choral Synagogue of Vilnius | Choralinė sinagoga | Judaism | 1903 | 54°40′34″N 25°16′53″E |
| | Church of the Intercession of the Holy Virgin, Vilnius | Švč. Dievo Motinos Užtarėjos sentikių cerkvė | Old Believers | 1906 | 54°40′00″N 25°17′28″E |
| | Church of Jesus Christ, Vilnius | Jėzaus Kristaus bažnyčia | Latter Day Saints | 1993 | 54°43′57″N 25°14′56″E |
| | Evangelical Lutheran Church, Vilnius | Evangelikų liuteronų bažnyčia | Protestantism | 1744 | 54°40′45″N 25°16′58″E |
| | Evangelical Reformed Church, Vilnius | Evangelikų reformatų bažnyčia | Protestantism | 1835 | 54°40′53″N 25°16′40″E |
| | Vilnius Kenesa | Vilniaus kenesa | Crimean Karaites | 1923 | 54°41′20″N 25°15′19″E |
