= Verkė =

River in Lithuania

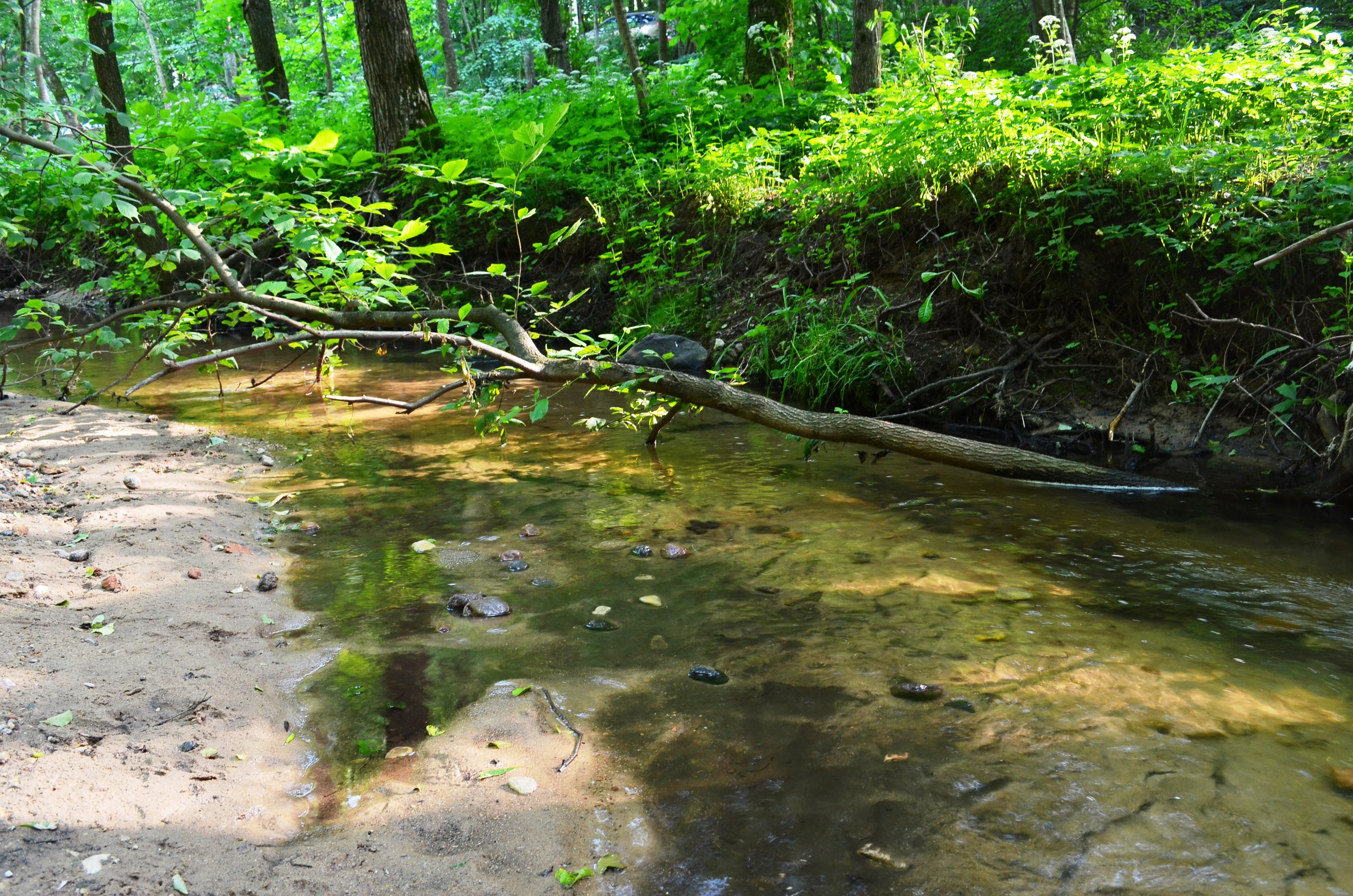
- Verkė stream in Jeruzalė

Location
- Country: Lithuania

Physical characteristics
- Source
  - location: Verkiai forest, Vilnius
- Mouth: Neris
  - coordinates: 54°44′43″N 25°17′29″E
- Length: 2 km (1.2 mi)

Basin features
- Progression: Neris→ Neman→ Baltic Sea

The Verkė is a small (around 2 km. long) rivulet in Vilnius, Lithuania, which gave the name to the Verkiai neighborhood. According to the legend, the Verkė was the birthplace of the semi-legendary pagan priest Lizdeika, a forefather of the Radziwiłł family, a Polish princely family.
