= Church of the Discovery of the Holy Cross, Vilnius =

Roman Catholic church in Vilnius, Lithuania

Coordinates: 54.740462°N 25.279809°E

Church of the Discovery of the Holy Cross
- Šv. Kryžiaus Atradimo bažnyčia (Lithuanian)
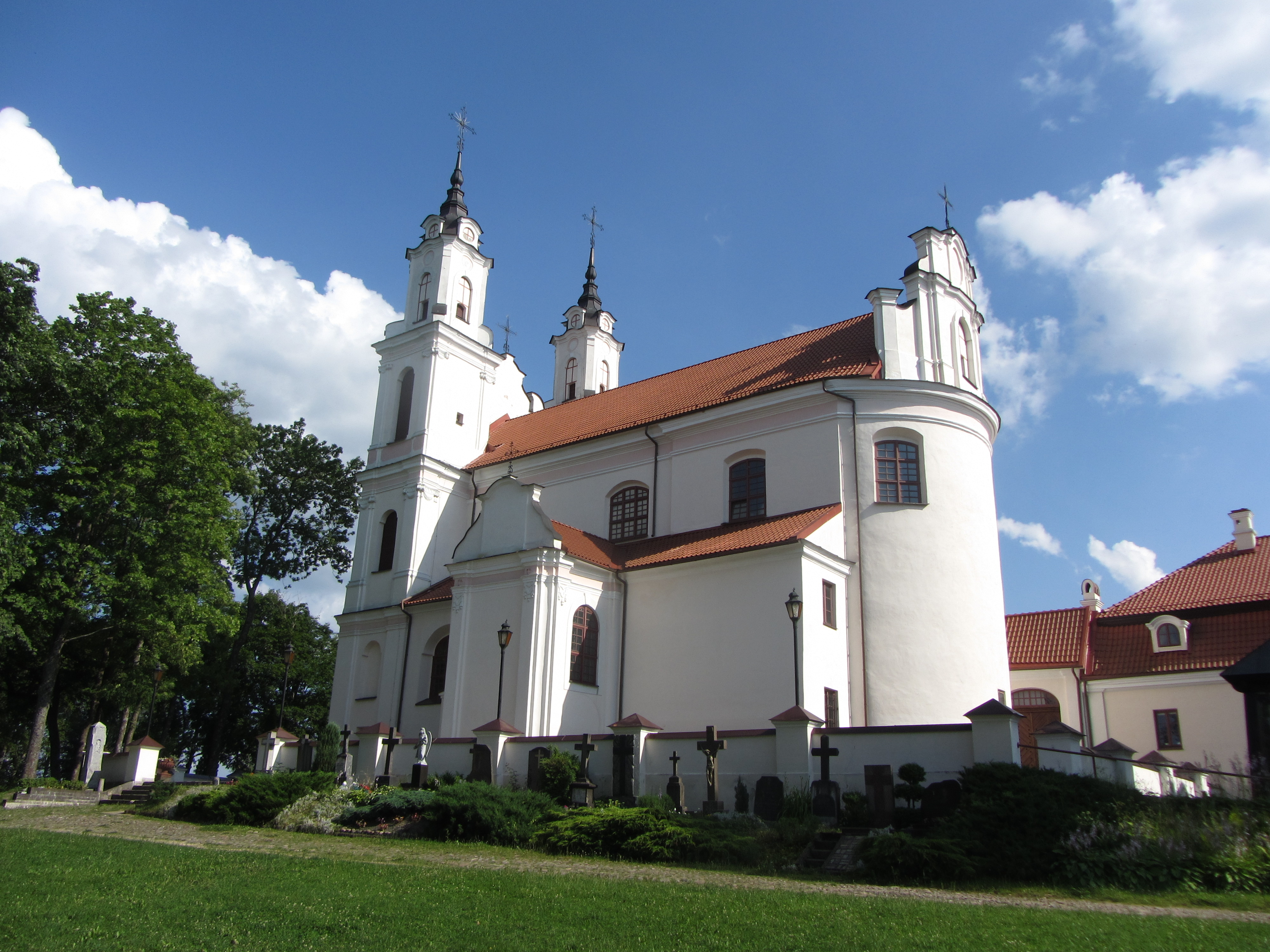
- Side and apse of the church
- Church of the Discovery of the Holy Cross
- Location: Vilnius, Lithuania
- Address: Kalvarijų St. 327
- Denomination: Catholic Church
- Website: vilniauskalvarijos.lt

History
- Status: Church
- Founded: 1669
- Founder: Jerzy Białłozor
- Dedication: Discovery of the Holy Cross
- Consecrated: First: June 9, 1669; Latest: 2002

Architecture
- Functional status: Active
- Architect: Johann Christoph Glaubitz
- Style: Baroque
- Completed: 1669 (wooden), 1700 (masonry)

Administration
- Archdiocese: Archdiocese of Vilnius

The Church of the Discovery of the Holy Cross (Lithuanian: Šv. Kryžiaus Atradimo bažnyčia) (Note: in other languages also known as: Latin: Ecclesia Inventionis Sanctae Crucis, Polish: Kościół Znalezienia Krzyża Świętego, Ukrainian: Костел Віднайдення Святого Хреста, Belarusian: Касцёл Адшукання Святога Крыжа.) is a Roman Catholic church in the Jeruzalė neighborhood of Vilnius, Lithuania. Located on the right bank of Neris River, it is the centerpiece of the Vilnius Calvary, a 35-station Way of the Cross.

== History ==
=== 17th century ===
The original purpose of the church was to show appreciation to God for the victory against the Russian army in the Battle of Vilnius during the Second Northern War, which started in 1655 and lasted until 1661. The construction of the church began in 1662 under the supervision of the Bishop of Vilnius Jerzy Białłozor. Białłozor died in 1665 and his heir, Bishop Aleksander Michał Sapieha, took charge of the construction. In 1668, he entrusted the local Dominicans from the Convent of the Holy Spirit in Vilnius with the supervision of the construction; this was validated by the Master of the Dominican Order in 1670. The church was solemnly consecrated on June 9, 1669 on the feast of Pentecost.

In 1675, the new Bishop of Vilnius Mikołaj Stefan Pac transferred Vilnius Calvary to Observant Dominicans from the Congregation of St Louis Bertrand, who had arrived from Warsaw. The wooden church burned down that year, so the Dominicans began rebuilding it. The construction of a monastery and the first masonry church of the Discovery of the Holy Cross, which was completed in 1700, had begun.

=== 18th century ===
A Trinitarian convent with the Church of the Holy Trinity in Trinapolis, began to operate as a branch of the Church of the Discovery of the Holy Cross, whose mission was to rescue Christian captives from Muslims.

In 1755, the Dominicans of Vilnius launched the construction of a new church, a monastery and twenty new masonry chapels for the calvary. The main sponsors of the effort were minor nobility from the Grand Duchy of Lithuania, with support from the Bishop of Vilnius and other clergy. The interior of the sanctuary was decorated with frescoes, showing the legend of the Finding and Glorification of the Holy Cross, episodes from the New Testament and other scenes reflecting devotion to the Sacred Heart.

In 1772, the Church of the Discovery of the Holy Cross and twenty chapels were consecrated. In 1793, a sumptuous sacristy, decorated in stucco, was added to the church. A spacious refectory flanked the convent building.

=== 19th century ===
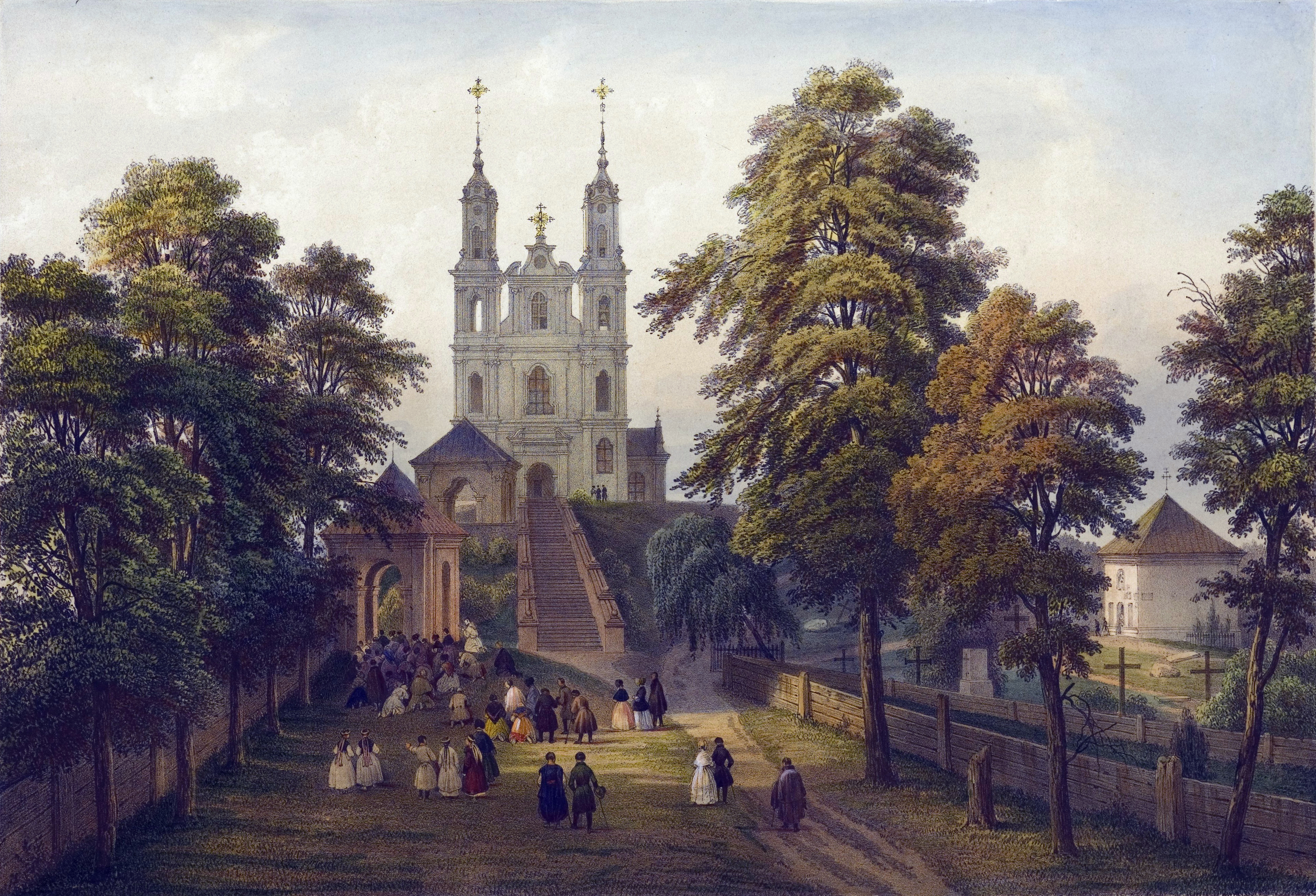
The church in the 19th century

In 1812, during the French invasion of Russia, the French soldiers turned the church into a barrack and a hospital. After the war ended, the soldiers robbed the church. Sometime after, there was a fire which destroyed the church's library with the archives, thus destroying many important documents relating to the church's history. In 1850, the Emperor of Russia Alexander III closed the monastery and gave the church to the Orthodox Christians.

=== 20th–21st centuries ===
In 1906, the interior of the church was restored. During the Soviet occupation of Lithuania, the Church of the Discovery of the Holy Cross was left untouched, although the monastery was closed down.

In 1990, after Lithuania regained independence, work to rebuild the calvary was begun. The chapels were completely rebuilt and solemnly consecrated at Pentecost in 2002. In the span of twelve years, sixteen masonry chapels, seven wooden and one masonry gates and a bridge were built.

== Architecture ==
Interior of the church

Built high up on a hill, the Baroque-style Church of the Discovery of the Holy Cross is the center of the Vilnius Calvary ensemble both physically and conceptually. The three stations that commemorate Christ's crucifixion, death and removal from the Cross are part of the church building. Station numbers 31 and 33 are on the outside walls near the transept, while station 32, the Crucifixion, is the main altar inside the church.

Architecturally, the church is a vaulted basilica of Latin-cross shape. Two 77.5-metre (254 ft) high towers, which narrow at the top and end with elegant helmets, embellish the façade. The architectural forms of the building are highlighted by polychrome. The main façade of the sanctuary is particularly embellished, with prolonged forms, windows, niches and pilasters of the walls which create the vertical line and emphasize the height of the forms. The façade faces the calvary where the steep high steps lead. Looking up from the base of the stairs, the vertical lines of the church's architecture stand out.

=== Interior ===
The interior of the church has preserved the authentic forms of the late Baroque. Inside the church, the central nave stands out due to its height and width, and it passes on to the presbytery of the same height, which ends in semicircular apse. A pair of pillars, united by an arch, divides the central part from narrower and lower aisles. The transept is formed by small chapels built in the aisles. Six Baroque altars, made from the artificial multicoloured marble, the pulpit, the baptistery and the organ make a united ensemble of the interior. The architectural forms of the altars are elegant; they are embellished by stucco sculptures and decorative mouldings. Designed with a lot of delicate decoration, the pulpit and baptistery are especially original and are united into Rococo composition.

== See also ==
- List of churches in Vilnius
- Catholic Church in Lithuania
