= Church of All Saints, Vilnius =

Coordinates: 54°40′32″N 25°17′04″E

Church of All Saints
- Visų Šventųjų bažnyčia (Lithuanian)
- The main façade of the church and bell tower
- Click on the map for a fullscreen view
- Location: Vilnius
- Address: Rūdninkų St. 20
- Country: Lithuania
- Denomination: Catholic
- Tradition: Latin Church
- Religious order: Order of the Brothers of the Blessed Virgin Mary of Mount Carmel
- Website: vvsventujuparapija.lt

History
- Founder: Wojciech Adalbert Chludziński
- Dedication: All Saints
- Consecrated: 1632

Architecture
- Functional status: Active
- Heritage designation: Part of the Vilnius Historic Centre (World Heritage Site, 1994)
- Architectural type: Church
- Style: Baroque, Rococo
- Years built: Church: 1620–1631; Bell tower: 1743
- Groundbreaking: 1620
- Completed: 1631 (church), 1743 (bell tower)

Specifications
- Materials: Plastered masonry, faux marble, gold, stucco

Administration
- Archdiocese: Roman Catholic Archdiocese of Vilnius

The Church of All Saints (Lithuanian: Visų Šventųjų bažnyčia) (Note: in other languages also known as: Latin: Ecclesia Omnium Sanctorum, Polish: Kościół Wszystkich Świętych, Ukrainian: Костел Всіх Святих, Belarusian: Касцёл Усіх Святых.) is a Baroque-style church in Vilnius, Lithuania. The church was built between 1620–1631 and was adopted for Carmelites' needs. In the second half of the 17th century, the church was linked with a monastery and formed a single complex.

== History ==
The church painted in the 18th century

The church between 1913–1929

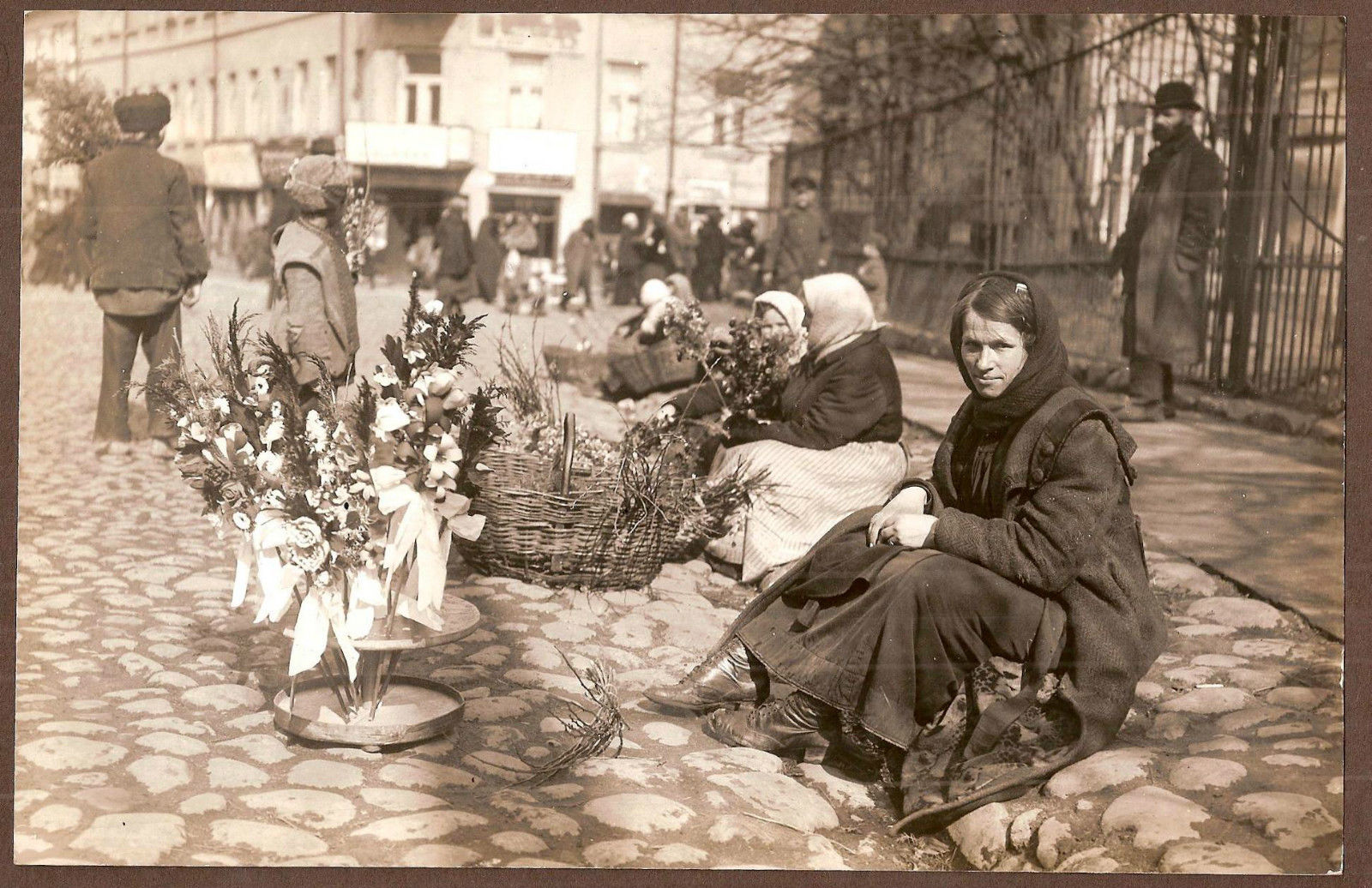
Vilnian selling Easter palms on the Rūdninkų St. near the church in 1916

The Church of All Saints in Vilnius was built in 1620–1631 on the initiative of Wojciech Adalbert Chludziński, Grand Secretary of Lithuania, on the outskirts of the city, at the south-western section of the city's defensive wall at the former Rūdininkai Gate. The Baroque style church was initially built towerless and its design was influenced by the Corpus Christi Church in Nyasvizh, which for centuries was a part of the Grand Duchy of Lithuania, and the Church of the Gesù in Rome. Moreover, in the first half of the 17th century a large old-regulation Carmelites' Monastery adjoining the church construction was begun by adapting existing buildings. In 1631–32, the main two-storey building following the street was completed; there are also several buildings of a later period and a tow-storey novitiate house with a small courtyard at the city wall.

Like many of the city's buildings, the church and monastery was damaged during the Polish–Lithuanian Commonwealth's First Northern War with the Tsardom of Russia when the battle of Vilnius occurred in 1655, but the church, which stood in a strategic location, was not severely damaged and was soon restored once Vilnius was liberated from the Russian occupation in 1661 by the Samogitian Division of the Grand Ducal Lithuanian Army under the leadership of Michał Kazimierz Pac.

In 1743, a bell tower of late Baroque design was added to the left side of the façade, reflecting the traditions of the Vilnian Baroque. Moreover, at the time a sacristy with a library above it were also built. The church with a new tall bell tower has become one of the landmarks of the Old Town. Moreover, during the renovation of the church its interior was enriched with ornate late Baroque altars and sculptures, created by A. Šelis. In the 16th–18th centuries the Carmelites actively participated in Vilnius's public life, held religious feasts and processions.

In 1810, a church's parish was established and it eventually became one of the largest in Vilnius. During the French invasion of Russia in 1812 the church interior was damaged by the retreating soldiers of the Grande Armée as they burned down its benches, confessionals and converted the church into a hospital. In 1819, the Carmelites established a parochial school in the monastery. The restoration of damages to the church were completed in 1823. The clergy of closed monasteries were relocated to the Carmelites' Monastery following the 19th century November Uprising and January Uprising; it also had a priests prison. In 1885, the Carmelites' Monastery was closed by the Tsarist authorities and its buildings were converted into blocks of flats, shops. In 1908, church's vicar Petras Kraujalis started to hold church services in Lithuanian language, which at the time were opposed by local Polish clergy.

The Church of all Saints is at the end of a street where the main gate to the Jewish ghetto was. During World War II, there was a tunnel through the sewers connecting the church with the ghetto. The priest of the church would provide bread to be taken into the ghetto through the tunnel. He also hid some Jews smuggled out of the ghetto through the tunnel. There were also Christian Lithuanians who helped smuggle Litvaks food into the ghetto. During the Soviet occupation period, the church was closed in 1948 and initially was used as a grocery warehouse, but after the reconstruction between 1967–1975 by architect Aldona Švabauskienė it was converted into a museum of folk art.

Following the Re-Establishment of the State of Lithuania in 1990, the church was returned to the faithful in 1991 and restored. A part of paintings venerated for graces and dating to the Carmelites' Monastery period were reinstated in the church (e.g. the 17th century painting Mother of God, Savior of Souls in Purgatory, and painting The Mother of God with the Child). The weekly masses in the church are held four times in Lithuanian and three times in Polish. The rites of Baptism, Eucharist, Confession, Confirmation, marriage, Sacrament of the Anointing of the Sick, funeral, blessings of tombstones and homes are held regularly in the church or if necessary by church's priests personally visiting people.

== Architecture ==
=== Exterior ===
Apse of the church

Sculpture of Saint Elijah, which previously adorned the exterior

The church is a massive, three-naved basilica featuring a deep presbytery and two domed chapels on the sides. It is one of the first early Baroque churches in Lithuania to be built without towers (per initial project). Its main façade faces the historic Rūdninkų Street, and the structure follows the widespread Il Gesù type – a design that originated in Rome and served as a model for many Baroque churches across Europe. The substantial volumes of the church and the former Carmelites' Monastery adjoin the former defensive wall of Vilnius.

Historically, the church pediment was adorned with two polychromed wooden statues of Saint Elijah and Saint Elisha. The choice of these religious personalities was not accidental as they are considered the first hermits of Mount Carmel and the spiritual founders of the Order of the Brothers of the Blessed Virgin Mary of Mount Carmel. Although the wooden statues deteriorated over time due to adverse weather conditions, their presence on the façade underscored the Order's origins and its connection to biblical traditions. Nevertheless, the historic sculptures were preserved and have since been moved inside the church.

A five-story masonry bell tower was built near the northeastern corner of the church in 1743. It lends the ensemble features of the Late Baroque and Rococo styles. The bell tower is graceful and richly decorated, featuring deep niches, undulating cornices, and ornamental vases. The bell tower's domed roof is of Rococo style. This tall element stands out against the lower, broader church building and serves as an important feature of the skyline of Vilnius Old Town.

The church's back façade has a massive three-sided apse, characterized by the simplicity of the Early Baroque style. Its walls are plastered and painted a reddish hue, punctuated by tall, semi-circular windows and rectangular niches in the upper tier. The church is covered by a high, gabled roof of red tiles. A small metal Christian cross is placed above the apse, while a graceful Baroque turret rises in the background, providing a vertical accent to the building. Small dormer windows are set into the roof slope, ensuring ventilation and lighting for the attic spaces of the church.

East of the church lies a square, in which the Convent of the Discalced Carmelites once stood alongside a Baroque Church of St. Joseph the Betrothed, which was established in 1638 by Stefan Pac, the Vice-Chancellor of Lithuania. Its exterior was also of Il Gesù-type and reminiscent of the Church of St. Theresa. In 1877, the Church of St. Joseph the Betrothed was demolished by the tsar's order, to be replaced by a market (presently it is a Lazdynų Pelėda Square).

=== Interior ===
Interior of the church, viewed towards the High Altar

The interior of the church features a three-aisled basilica plan, articulated by massive piers connected by semicircular arches. The central nave is significantly higher and wider than the side aisles, terminating in a spacious presbytery and a three-sided apse. All the naves are covered by barrel vaults with lunettes, which lend the interior a sense of grandeur and solemnity characteristic of the Early Baroque, while also ensuring ample natural light through high-set windows.

Historically, one of the most extensive ensembles of altars in Vilnius was formed within the church's interior. The 18th-century inventories mention as many as 19 altars, distributed throughout the central nave, side naves, and chapels. This abundance reflected the active work of the Carmelites' Order and their specific devotional traditions. Although the number of altars shifted over time, particularly following the church's reconstructions in the 19th century and during the Soviet occupation period, the surviving examples represent the pinnacle of Late Baroque sculptural art, in which architectural forms are organically interwoven with sculptural elements. Currently, there are 18 altars in the church.

The High Altar during a Holy Mass

The High Altar was created around 1787 based on a design by the architect Marcin Knackfus. It is a two-tiered structure framed by large columns with Corinthian capitals. The lower section features a distinctive undulating cornice and faux-marble finishes, which creates a sumptuous appearance. In the centre of the High Altar stands an ornate tabernacle topped with a gilded crucifix, while above it hangs a large painting The Triumph of All Saints. The sculptures and gilded figures of angels are characterized by the expressive poses, which are typical of the Late Baroque style.

The side altars, positioned against the piers and the walls of the naves, create a cohesive artistic rhythm throughout the sacred space. While their architectural design echoes the motifs of the High Altar, each features its own distinct iconography. The altarpieces combine faux marble in various colors, gilded carvings, and dynamic figural compositions. This ensemble serves not only as a liturgical setting but also as a primary visual focal point, uniting all the spaces of the church into a unified theological program.

The Late Baroque period organ case

On the western side, above the main entrance of the church, there is an organ loft supported by a massive arcade. The organ loft area is adorned with an ornate organ case, characterized by Baroque forms and graceful carvings. A large semicircular window above the organ provides abundant natural light, which highlights the sculptural qualities of the musical instrument and the stucco ornamentation on the vaults. The Late Baroque style organ case of mostly white color with gilding and with three towers was preserved. However, the authentic organ of the church was not preserved and Wacław Biernacki's organ, installed in the early 20th century, was damaged during the Soviet occupation period, thus currently a temporary organ is installed in the church with electric traction.

Attached to one of the central piers is a Late Baroque-style pulpit, which is richly decorated with sculptural elements and reliefs depicting the Four Evangelists and religious symbols.

The walls and vaults of the church are adorned with fragments of wall paintings and valuable easel paintings that reflect the spirituality of the Carmelite Order. The central section is dominated by iconography of All Saints and the Holy Family. Following the restoration in 1991, the church's artistic treasures were augmented by altarpieces and frescoes created by the artist Antanas Kmieliauskas. Nevertheless, the Baroque period frescoes of the naves walls and domes that were painted over under the direction of parish priest L. Cziudovski in 1902 were not yet uncovered.

Beneath the church floor are spacious cellars with crypts, where monks from the Carmelites' Monastery, patrons of the church, and prominent townspeople of Vilnius were buried.

==== Chapels ====
Chapel of the Scapular of Our Lady of Mount Carmel

The church has two domed chapels in its sides. Looking from the main entrance of the church in the left side is the Chapel of St. Elijah and on the right side is the Chapel of the Scapular of Our Lady of Mount Carmel.

The more important chapel is dedicated to the Scapular of Our Lady of Mount Carmel and Saint Joseph, and is characterized by a more intimate space and distinctive ornamentation. In the centre of the altar is placed painting The Holy Family (or The Mother of God with the Child and Saints). Above it, a round stained-glass window creates a light effect typical of the Baroque style, symbolizing Divine providence. The altar is framed by massive columns with Corinthian capitals, decorated with faux marble. Flanking the central painting are expressive, polychromed wooden sculptures: on the left side is a saint of royal lineage (likely Saint Casimir or the patron who commissioned the work), and on the right side is a Church Father or an Carmelites Order's superior.

In the upper section of the altar (the attics), smaller easel paintings in gilded frames are incorporated, depicting saints of the Carmelites Order. The upper part of the altar abounds with figures of plaster angels (Putto) that appear to support the cornices or adorn the volutes. At the very top, a monogram is visible against a backdrop of radiating rays. A checkerboard pattern of black and white tiles lends depth to the space and underscores the church's rigorous layout.

== See also ==
- List of churches in Vilnius
- Catholic Church in Lithuania
