= Verkiai Calvary =

Place of worship in Vilnius, Lithuania

Coordinates: 54°43′51″N 25°17′14″E

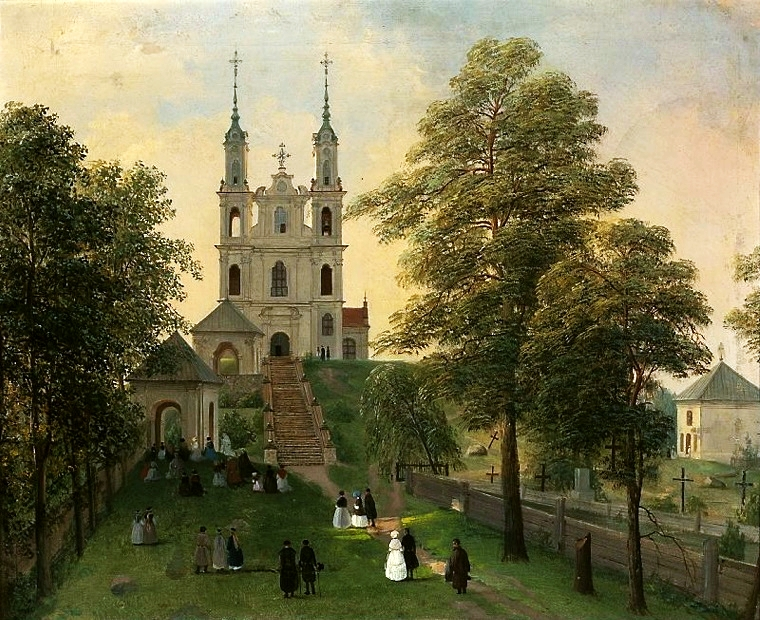
Vilnius Calvary in 1840s by Jan Chrucki

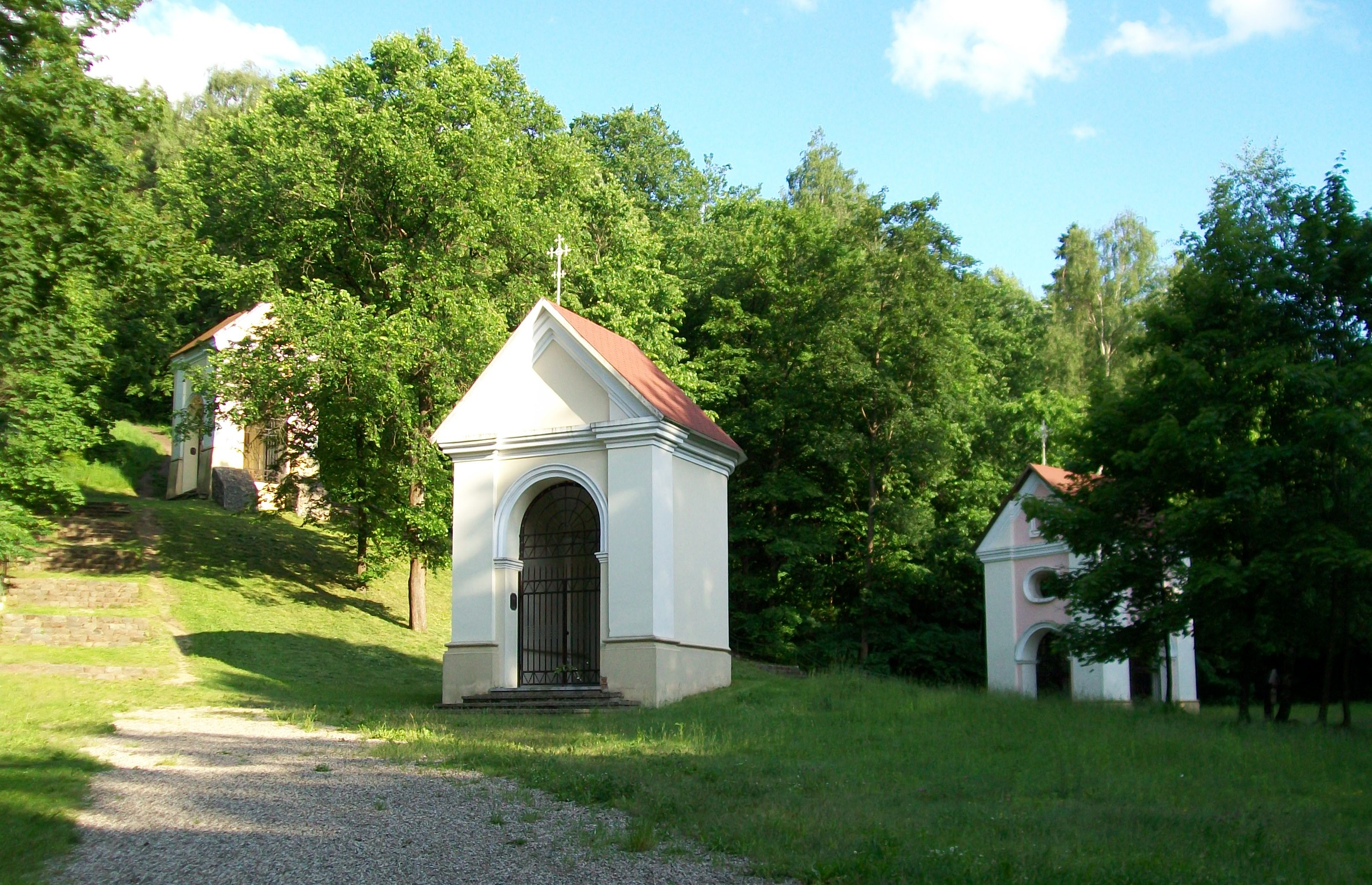
Three reconstructed chapels (stations 2 to 4) of Verkiai Calvary

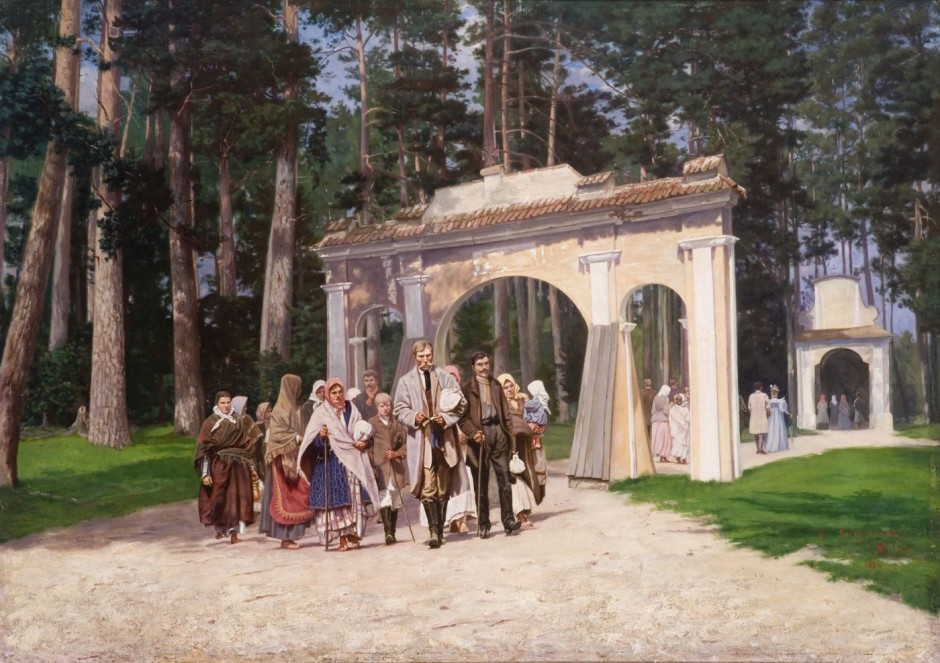
Franciszek Jurewicz 1894 painting, depicting pilgrims in the Verkiai Calvary

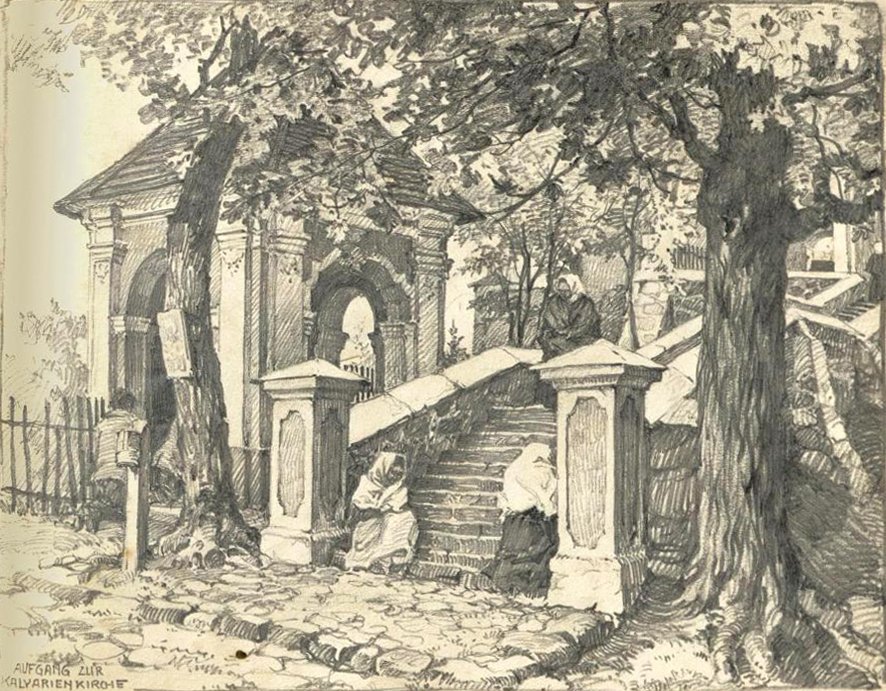
Curt Sauermilch 1918 painting, depicting pilgrims in the Verkiai Calvary

Verkiai Calvary or Vilnius Calvary is the second oldest calvary in Lithuania after Žemaičių Kalvarija. It is located in Verkiai, a neighborhood of Vilnius, capital of Lithuania. The calvary was built in 1662–1669 as a sign of gratitude for the victory in the Second Northern War (1655–1660). The calvary includes 20 brick chapels, seven wooden and one brick gate, and one bridge with a wooden chapel. The path ends at the Church of the Discovery of the Holy Cross. In 1962 all chapels, except four closest to the church, were destroyed by the Soviet authorities. The calvary was reconstructed in 1990–2002.

== Stations ==
The calvary has 35 stations:

1. The Last Supper
2. On the Way to the Mount of Olives
3. In the garden of Gethsemane
4. Arrest of Jesus
5. Crossing the Kidron Valley
6. Disciples flee Jesus before the Gate of the Town
7. At the First Gate of Zion
8. Jesus taken to Annas
9. At the High Priest Caiaphas
10. Jesus imprisoned in the basement of Caiaphas' Palace
11. The second time at Caiaphas
12. At the Second Gate of Zion
13. Jesus before Pilate for the first time
14. The first time at the Iron Gate
15. Jesus at Herod's court
16. Jesus ridiculed by Herod for the second time at the Iron Gate
17. Jesus taken to Pilate through the Second Town Gate
18. At the Second Town Gate Jesus found worthier of death than the rebel Barabbas
19. Jesus flogged at the Gate of the Town Hall
20. At the Fourth Gate of the Old Town
21. Jesus sentenced to be crucified
22. Jesus takes his Cross
23. Jesus falls for the first time
24. Jesus meets his mother Mary
25. Simon of Cyrene helps Christ carry the Cross
26. Veronica wipes Christ's face with her veil
27. Jesus falls for the second time
28. Jesus meets the women of Jerusalem
29. Jesus falls for the third time
30. Jesus stripped of his garments
31. Jesus nailed to the Cross
32. Jesus dies on the Cross
33. Jesus' body is taken down of the cross
34. Jesus laid in the sepulcher
35. The discovery of the Holy Cross
