= Verkiai =

- Eldership
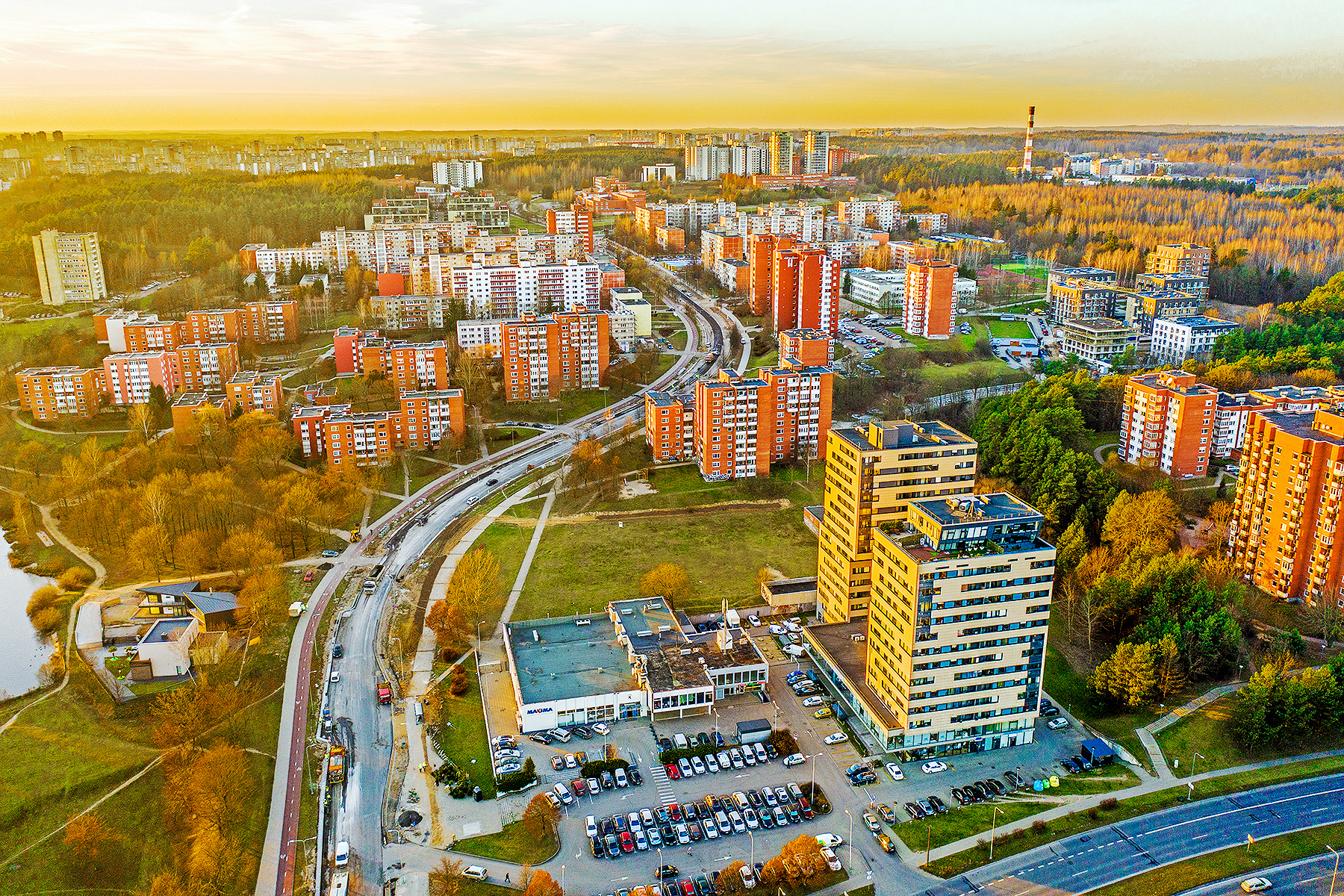
- Baltupiai microdistrict

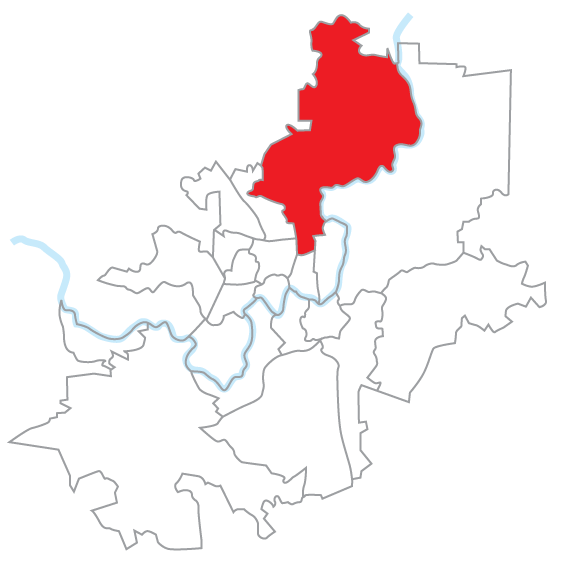

- Location of Verkiai
- Country: Lithuania
- County: Vilnius County
- Municipality: Vilnius city municipality

Area
  - Total: 56 km^{2} (22 sq mi)

Population (2021)
  - Total: 50,754
  - Density: 910/km^{2} (2,300/sq mi)
- Time zone: UTC+2 (EET)
  - Summer (DST): UTC+3 (EEST)

Holy Trinity Church in Verkiai elderate, overlooking Neris River

Verkiai (literally Lithuanian: a place near Verkė (etymology: 'to stream, to cry') river) is the northernmost eldership in Vilnius, Lithuania. It covers neighborhoods of Baltupiai, Jeruzalė, Visoriai, Santariškės, Balsiai, Ožkiniai, Didieji Gulbinai and the whole area of Verkiai Regional Park. Historically it was a separate settlement situated north of Vilnius but today it is a part of Vilnius city municipality. It occupies 5,565 ha and has 42,179 inhabitants. Verkiai Regional Park has been established in 1991 to preserve a valuable composition of historical, cultural, architectural, and nature landmarks.

== Landmarks ==
Verkiai has been known from Middle Ages, since Bishop of Vilnius built his palace here. It has been a residence of noble families in Verkiai Palace.

Verkiai Calvary is the second oldest Calvary in Lithuania established in 1662–69. Almost all chapels and gates (except those nearby the Roman Catholic Church of The Discovery of The Holy Cross), were demolished by the Soviet Union in 1963. They were reconstructed by 2002 in their original predominantly in Baroque style. The eldership also includes Baroque The Holy Trinity Church in and a Trinitarian monastery in Trinapolis.
