= Church of Christ the King and Infant Jesus, Vilnius =

Roman Catholic church in Vilnius, Lithuania built in 1935

Church of Christ the King and Infant Jesus Kristaus Karaliaus ir Šv. Kūdikėlio Jėzaus bažnyčia
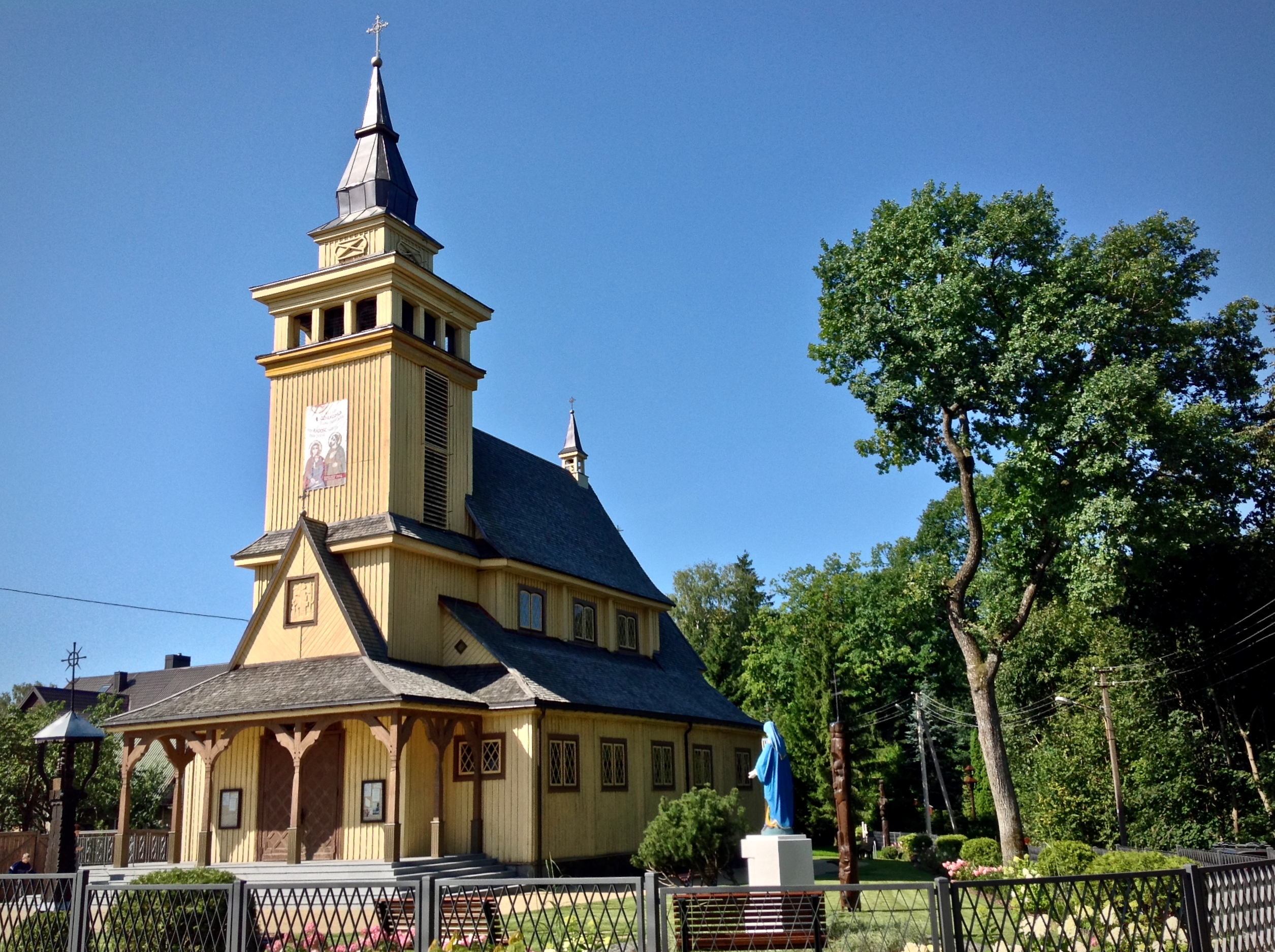
- Façade of the church in 2017

Religion
- Affiliation: Roman Catholic
- Diocese: Aukštasis Pavilnys
- Leadership: Roman Catholic Archdiocese of Vilnius
- Year consecrated: 1935

Location
- Location: Vilnius, Lithuania
- Interactive map of Church of Christ the King and Infant Jesus; Kristaus Karaliaus ir Šv. Kūdikėlio Jėzaus bažnyčia
- Coordinates: 54°40′23.4″N 25°21′26.99″E

Architecture
- Type: Church
- Completed: 1935
- Materials: Wood

Church of Christ the King and Infant Jesus (Lithuanian: Kristaus Karaliaus ir Šv. Kūdikėlio Jėzaus bažnyčia) is a Roman Catholic church in Aukštasis Pavilnys, the eastern part of the city of Vilnius, which was completed in 1935.

During Operation Ostra Brama, heavy fighting took place on the parish territory. Father Lucjan Sołtan, the parish priest and military chaplain of the local Home Army, organized the burial of Polish soldiers killed in the fighting and in a field hospital in the church cemetery. On July 10, 1993, a monument engraved with the names and codenames of the fallen Home Army soldiers was erected over the mass grave, through the efforts of the World Association of Home Army Soldiers and the Council for the Protection of Struggle and Martyrdom Sites.

In 2009 the church was inscribed to the Register of Cultural Heritage of Lithuania.

== Gallery ==
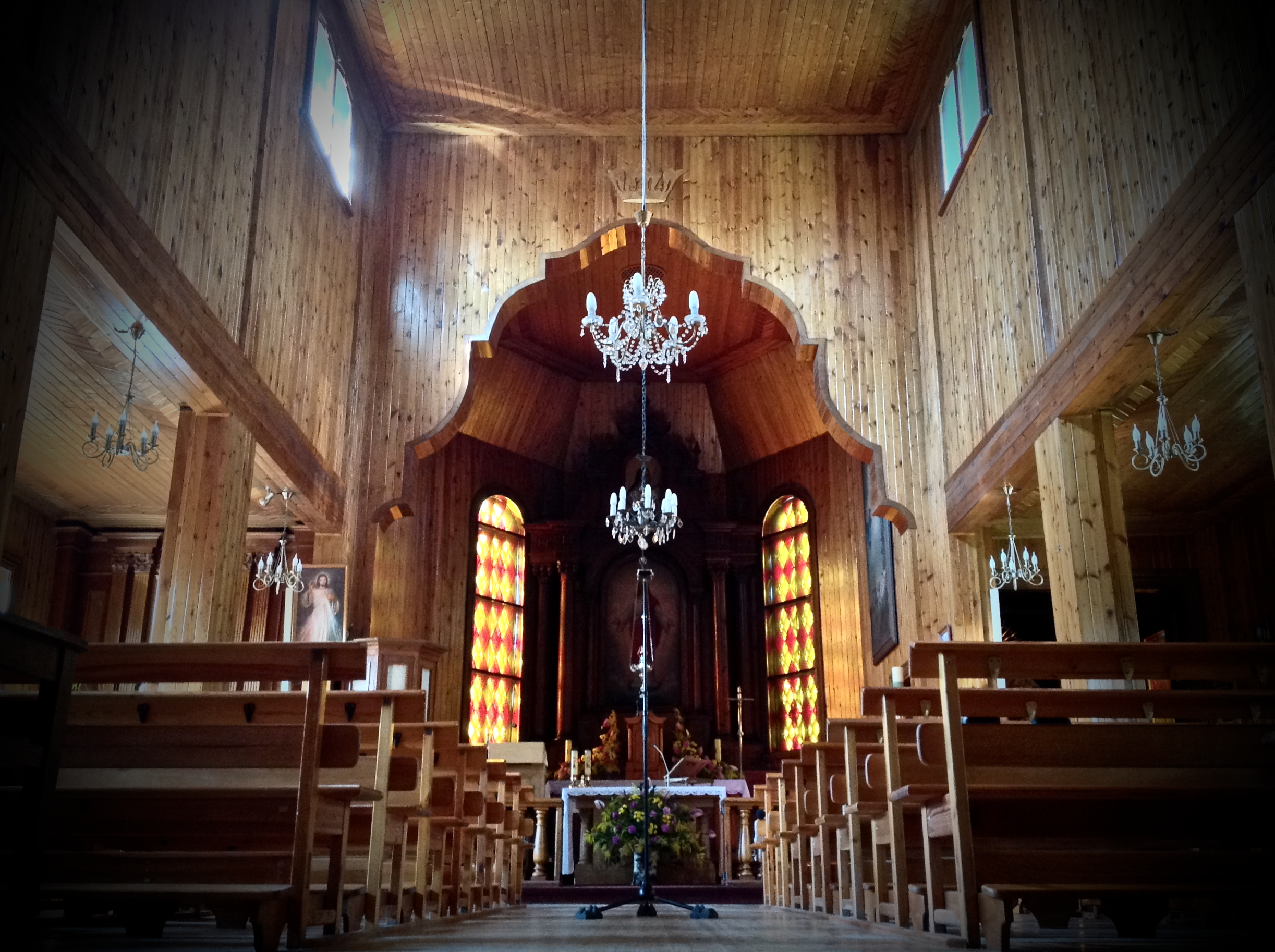
Interior of the church in 2017

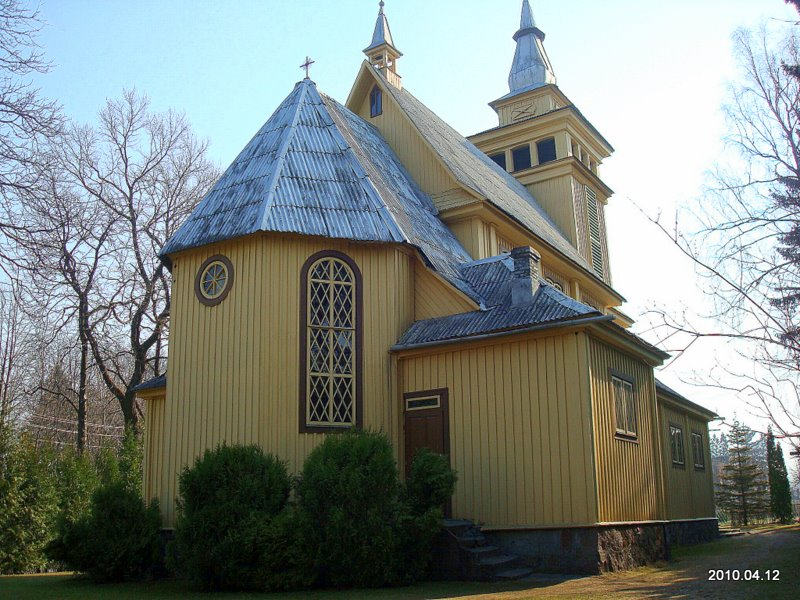
Back-view of the church in 2010
