= Church of St. Joseph the Betrothed, Vilnius =

Former church in Vilnius, Lithuania

Church of St. Joseph the Betrothed
- Vilniaus Šv. Juozapo sužadėtinio bažnyčia
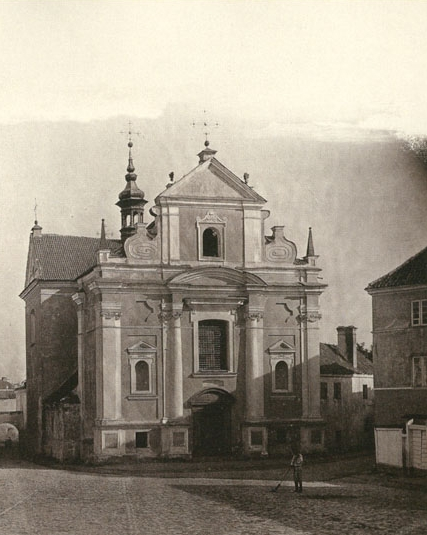
- Façade of St. Joseph's the Betrothed before demolition

Religion
- Affiliation: Roman Catholic
- Diocese: Old Town
- Year consecrated: 1636

Location
- Location: Vilnius, Lithuania
- Interactive map of Church of St. Joseph the Betrothed
- Coordinates: 54°40′33″N 25°17′8″E

Architecture
- Type: Church
- Style: Baroque
- Completed: 1668
- Demolished: 1877

Church of St. Joseph the Betrothed (Lithuanian: Vilniaus Šv. Juozapo sužadėtinio bažnyčia; Polish: Kościół św. Józefa Oblubieńca) is a demolished Roman Catholic church in Vilnius' Old Town, which previously was located in Arklių St. The church was established in 1638 by the Vice-Chancellor of the Grand Duchy of Lithuania Stefan Pac and was used by the Carmelites. In 1877 the Church of St. Joseph the Betrothed was demolished by the Emperor's order, to be replaced by a market (presently it is a square).

== Gallery ==
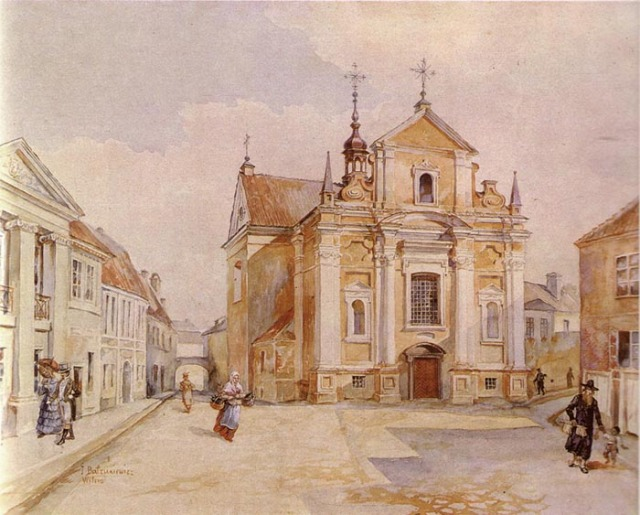
Painting of the Church of St. Joseph the Betrothed

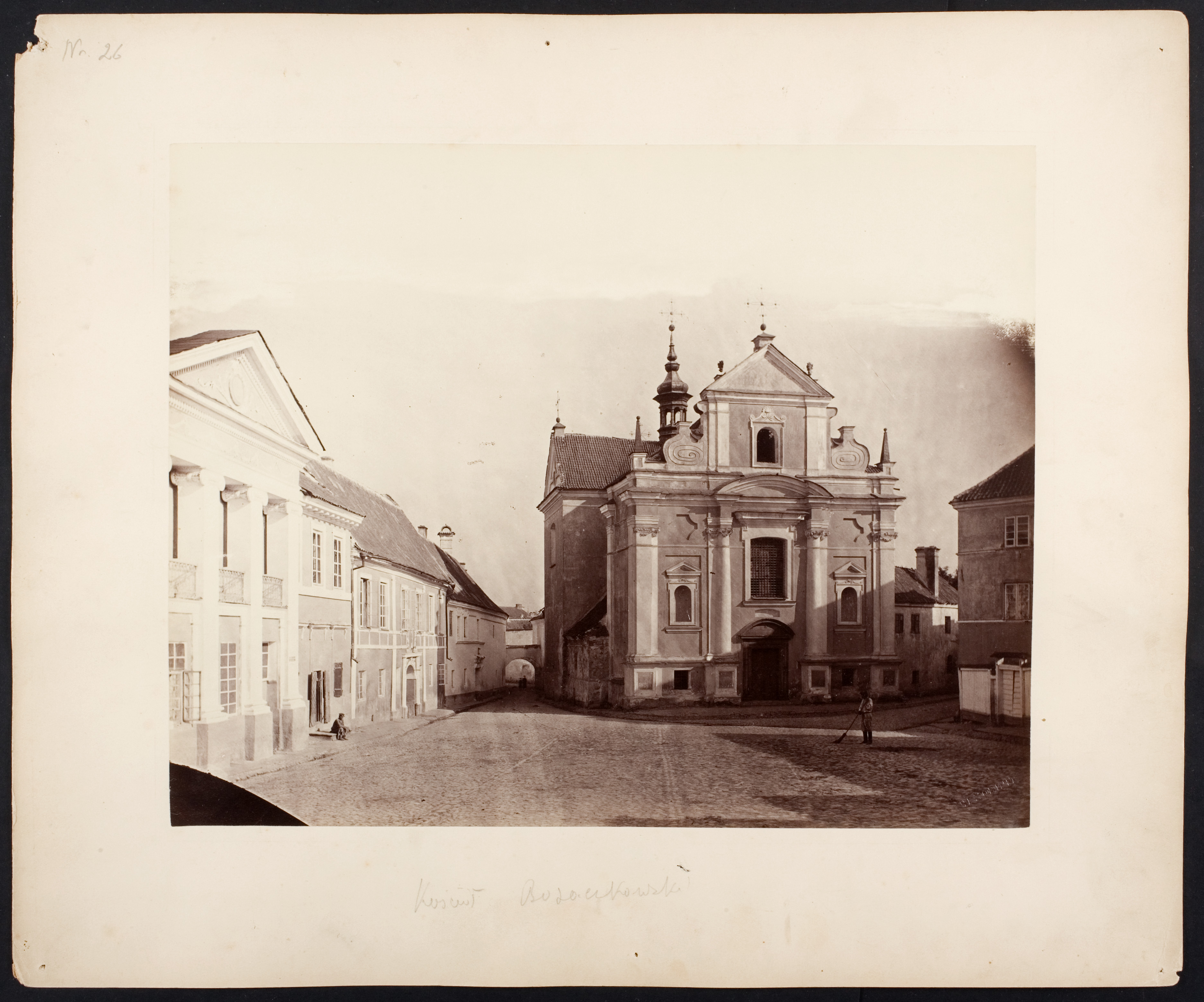
Church of St. Joseph the Betrothed

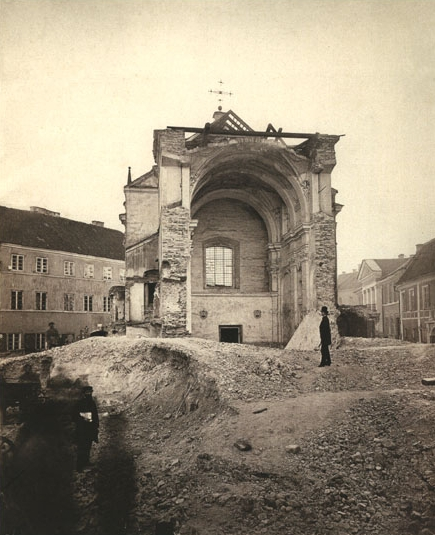
Demolition of the church in 1877
