= Jeruzalė =

Neighborhood of Vilnius. Lithuania

Coordinates: 54°44′35″N 25°16′41″E

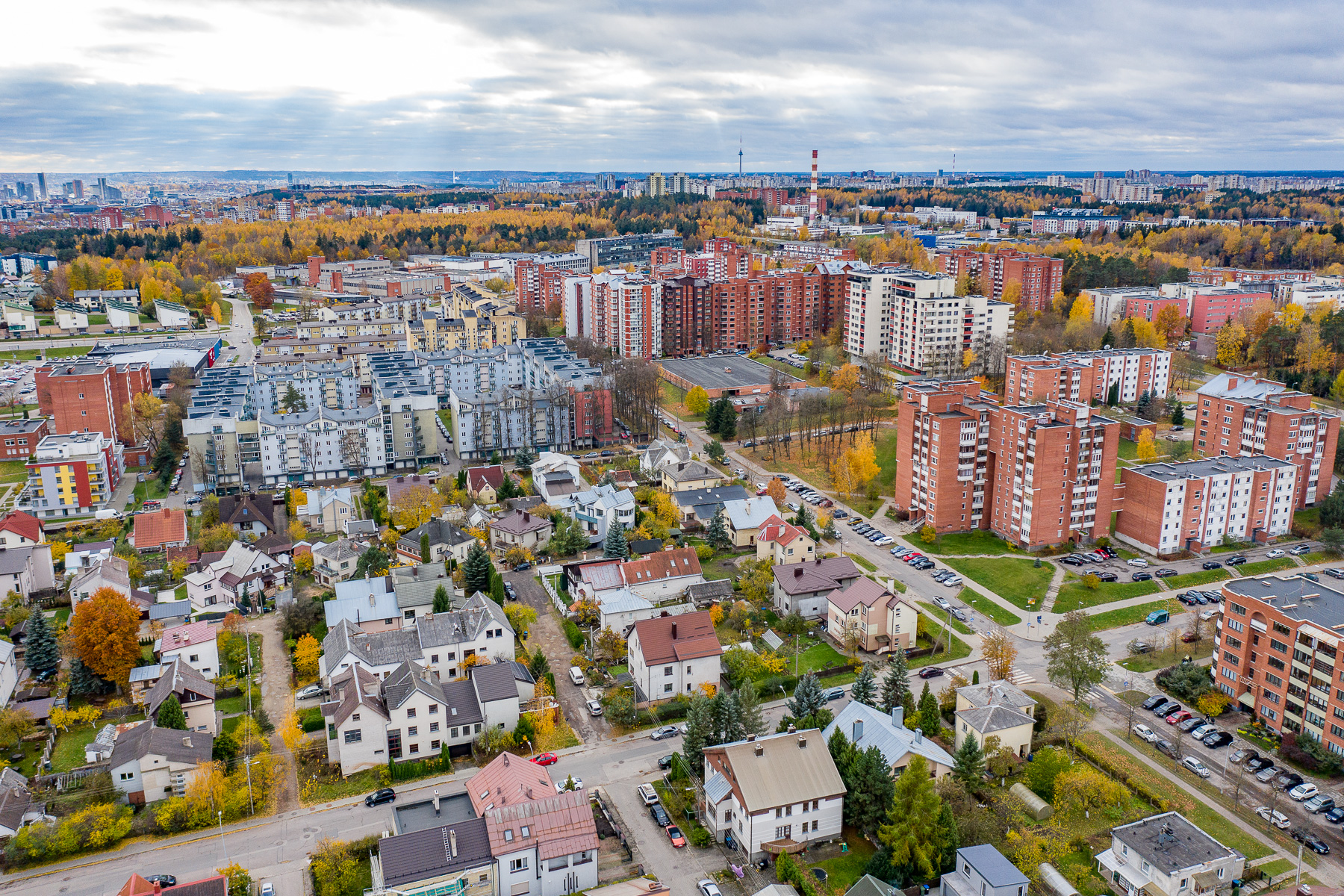
Jeruzalė, Vilnius, aerial view, 2023

Jeruzalė ("Jerusalem" in Lithuanian) is a neighborhood of Vilnius under the administration of the Verkiai eldersip (lt:Verkių seniūnija). It is located just north of the Vilnius city center, neighboring with Santariškės, Verkiai, Baltupiai, and Visoriai, approximately bordered by the Mokslininkų ("Scientists") street in the north, Iron Wolf street in the west, Ateities street in the south, and the Jeruzalė street in the east.

== History ==
The area was named after Jerusalem in the second half of the 17th century when a church and a Dominican monastery were built there on the land allocated from the Verkiai manor belonged to the diocese of Vilnius. Eventually it became a small village in the suburbs of Vilnius known under the Polish name Jerozolimka (Russian: Ерозолимка within the Russian Empire). In 1866 the settlement Jerozolima-Werki (Note: Werki is Verkiai now) (a.k.a. Jarozolimka) had 8 households with 55 residents. In the interwar period it had Jewish population, in addition to Poles. It was incorporated into Vilnius in 1930. First Lithuanian residents came to Jerozolimka in the wake of World War II.

== Sights ==
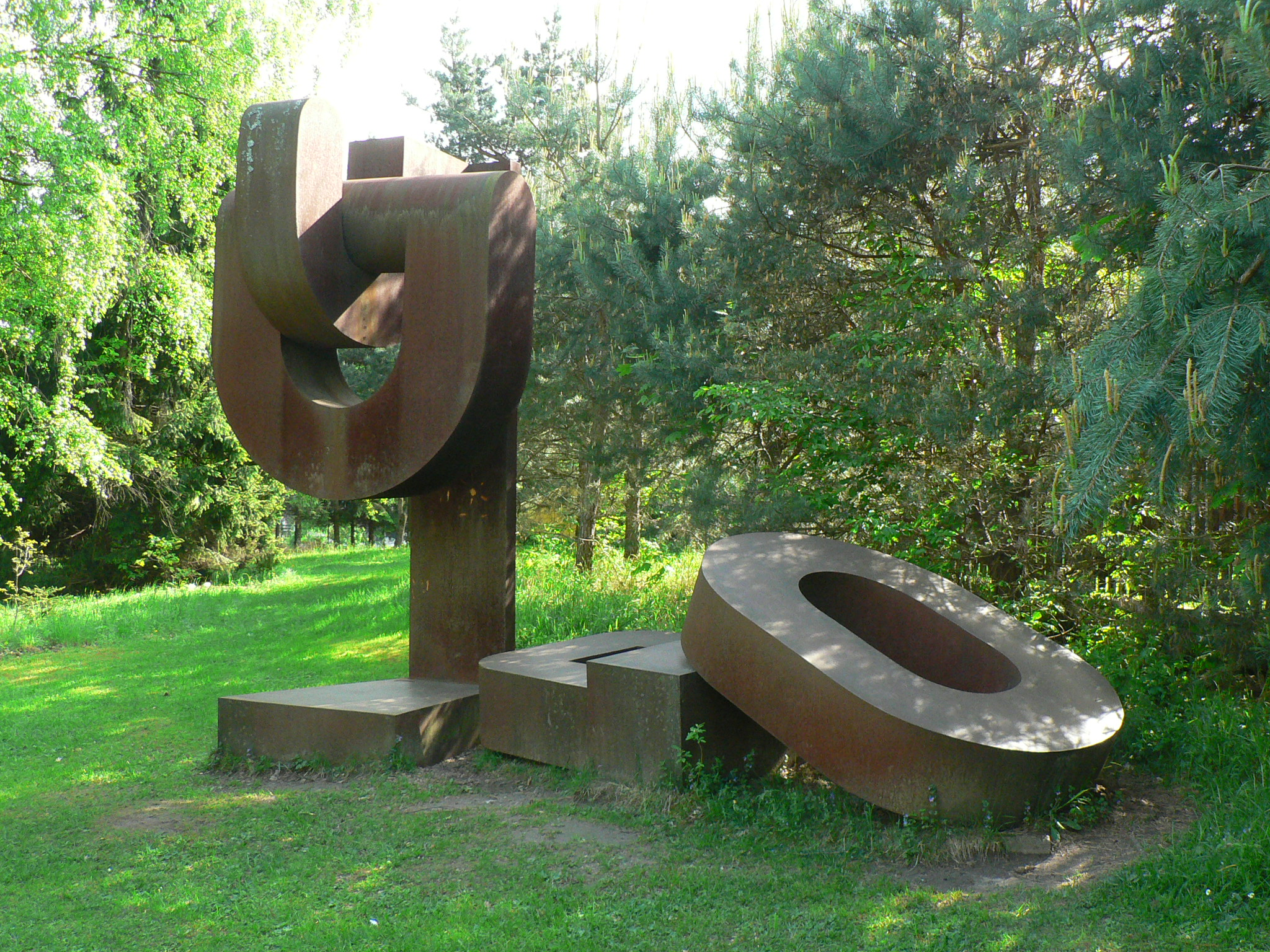
A sculpture by Mindaugas Navakas in the Sculpture Garden

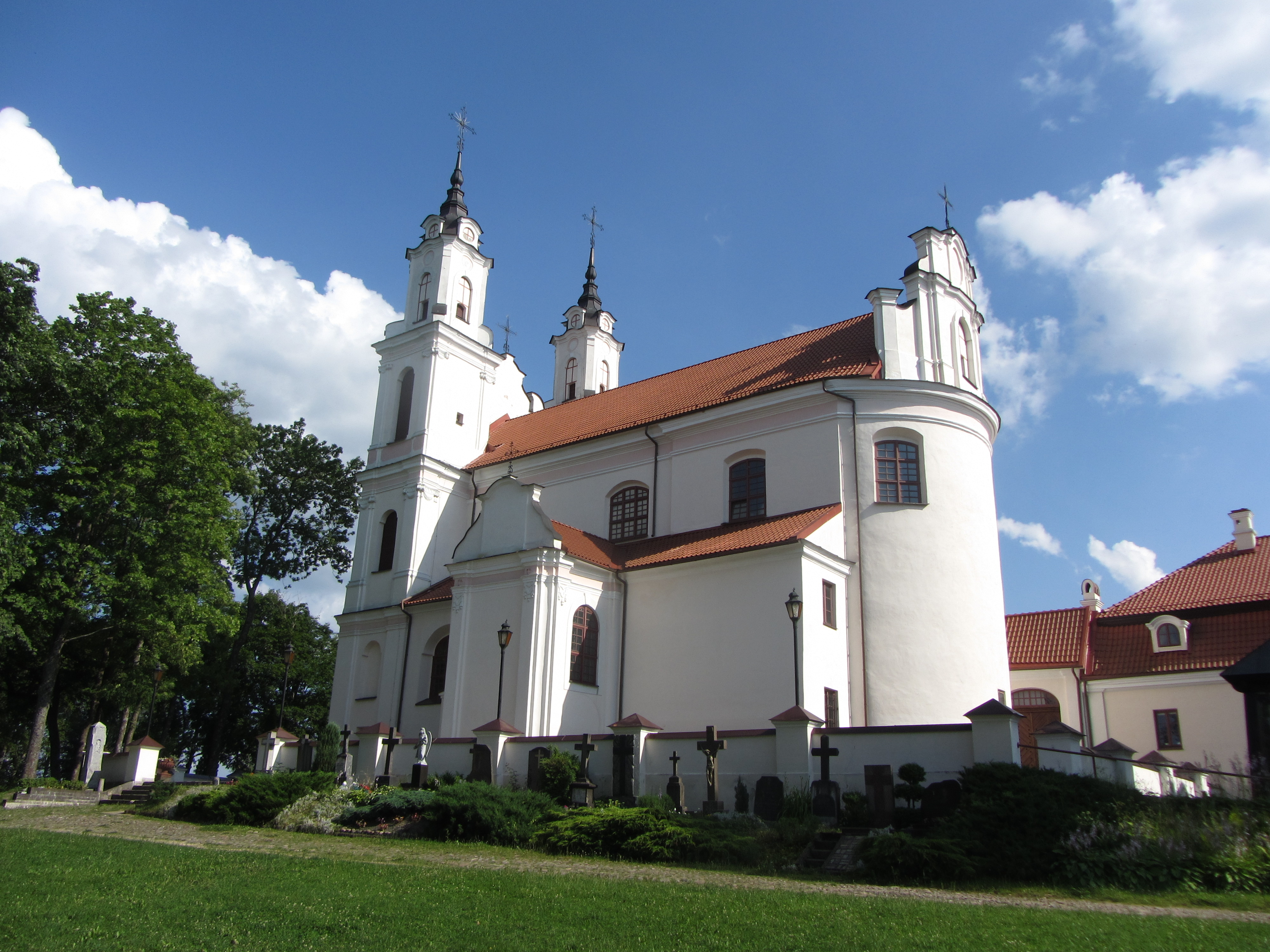
Church of the Discovery of the Holy Cross

- Church of the Discovery of the Holy Cross, Vilnius
- Jeruzalė Sculpture Garden
- Jeruzalė Pond
