= Church of the Holy Trinity in Trinapolis, Vilnius =

Roman Catholic church in Vilnius, Lithuania built in 1715–1721

Church of the Holy Trinity (Trinapolis) Švč. Trejybės (Trinapolio) bažnyčia
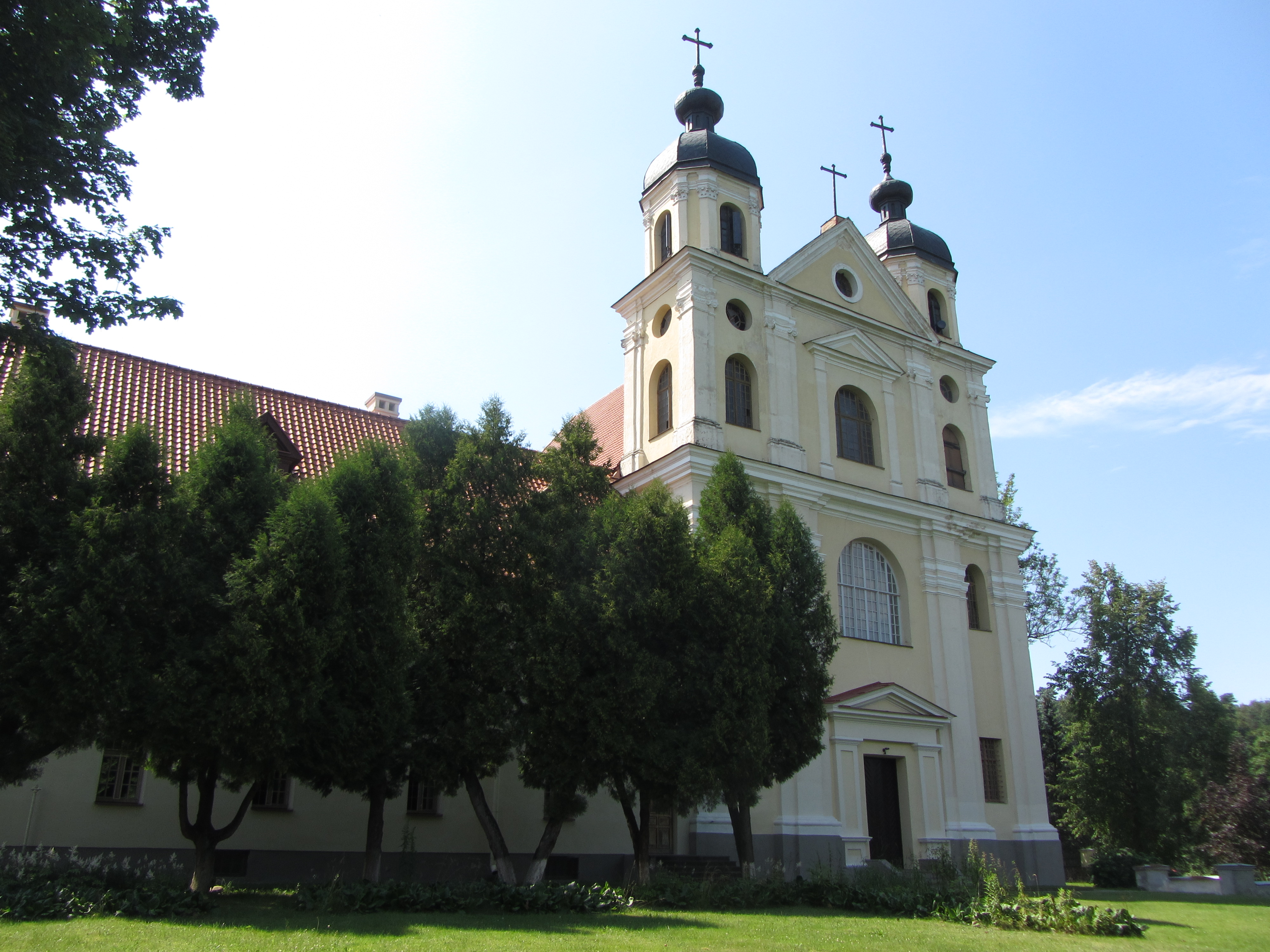
- Façade of the church in 2014

Religion
- Affiliation: Roman Catholic
- Diocese: Trinapolis
- Ecclesiastical or organizational status: Used as a church
- Leadership: Roman Catholic Archdiocese of Vilnius
- Year consecrated: 1722

Location
- Location: Vilnius, Lithuania
- Interactive map of Church of the Holy Trinity (Trinapolis); Švč. Trejybės (Trinapolio) bažnyčia
- Coordinates: 54°43′52″N 25°17′28″E

Architecture
- Type: Church
- Style: Baroque
- Completed: 1721 (church), 1772 (towers)
- Materials: Plastered masonry

Website
- Trinapolis.eu

Church of the Holy Trinity (Lithuanian: Švč. Trejybės bažnyčia) is a Roman Catholic church in Trinapolis, one of the parts of Lithuania's capital Vilnius. The church was built in 1715–1721 and consecrated in 1722. However, its towers were completed only in 1772.

The monastery closed in 1832 and in 1846 was given to the newly-established (1839) Russian Orthodox Diocese of Lithuania. It was returned to the Catholic Church after World War I.

Near the church there is a former Trinitarians monastery complex, who were invited to the area by Konstanty Kazimierz Brzostowski in 1700. Since then the area was called after the Trinitarians.

== Gallery ==
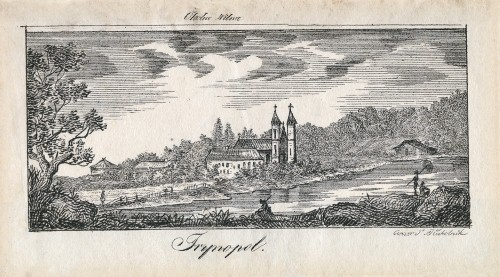
Painting of the church in 1840

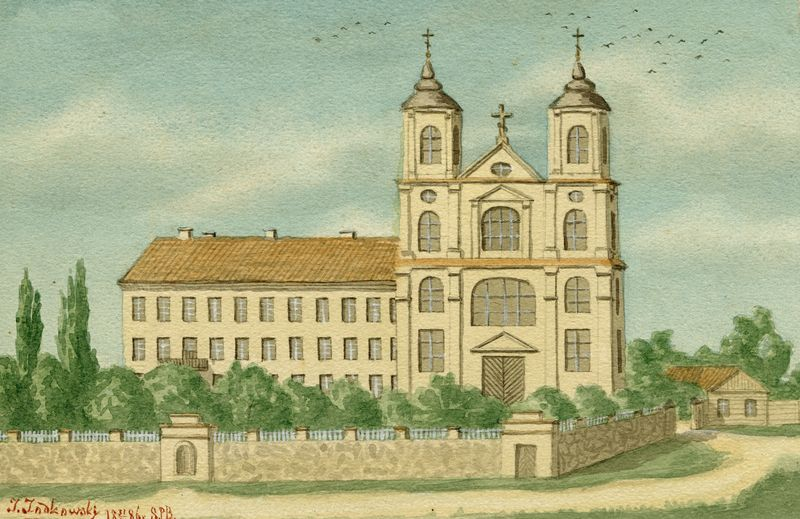
Painting of the church in 1886

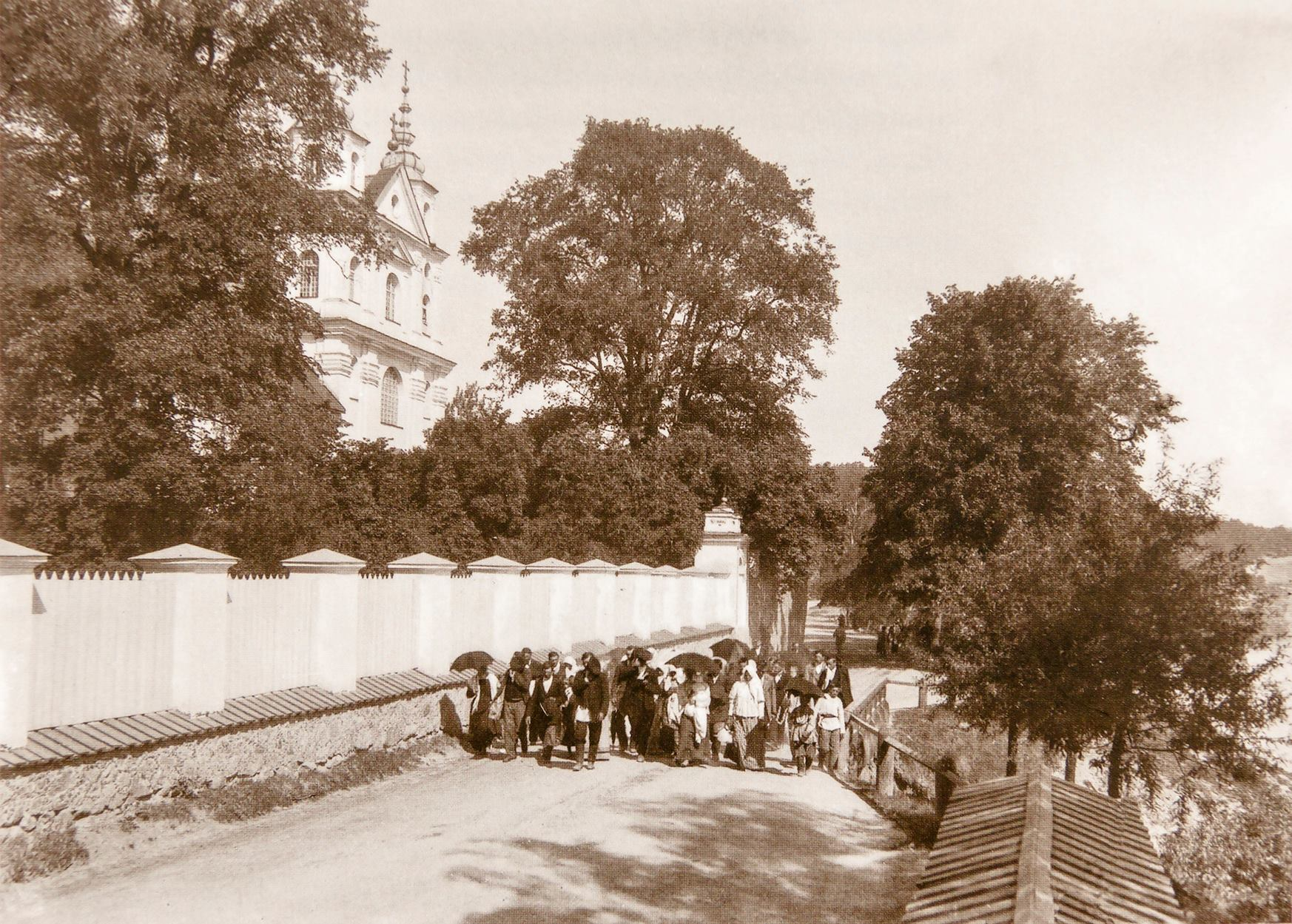
Photo of the monastery's complex in circa 1896

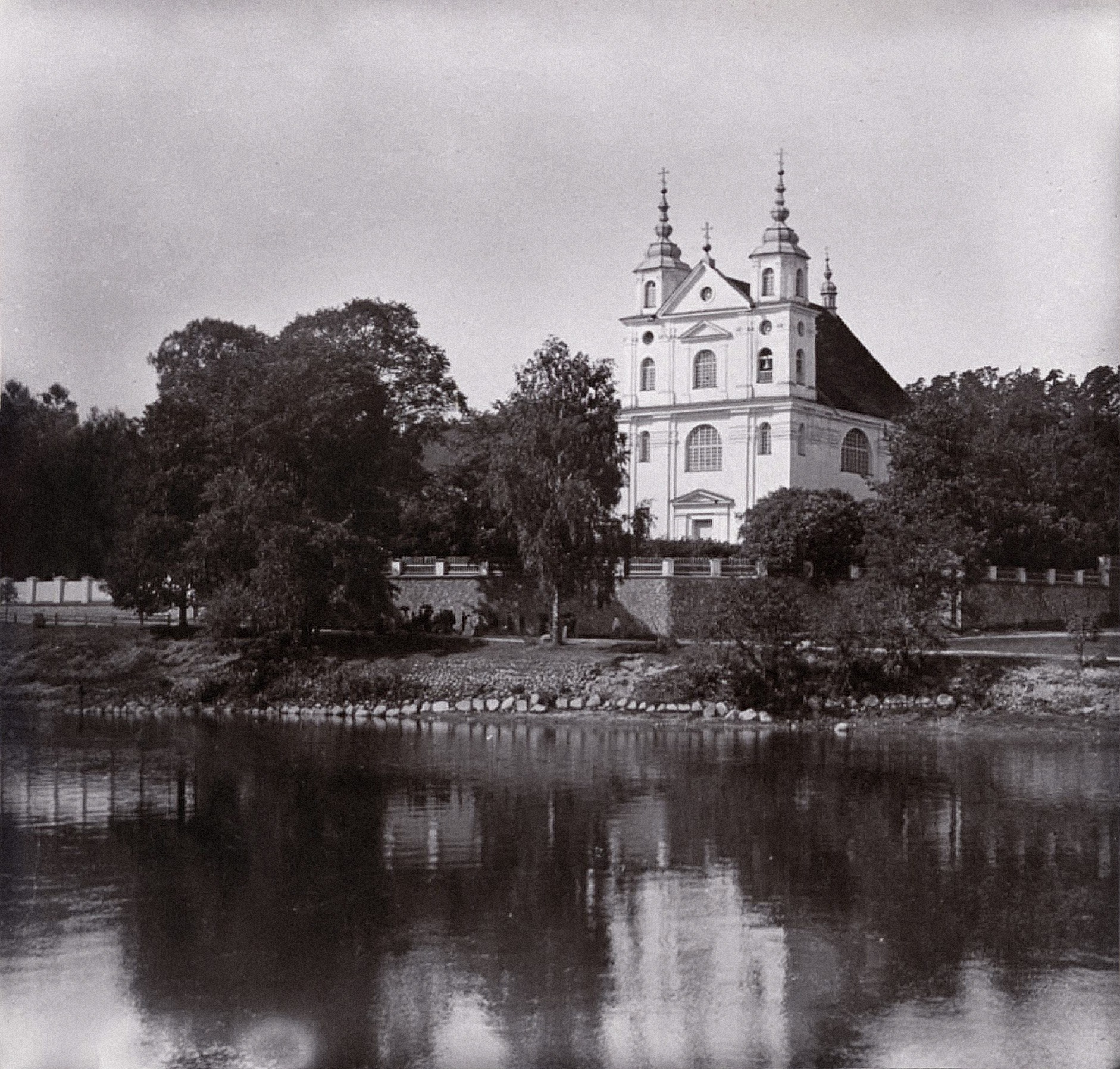
Photo of the church in 1900

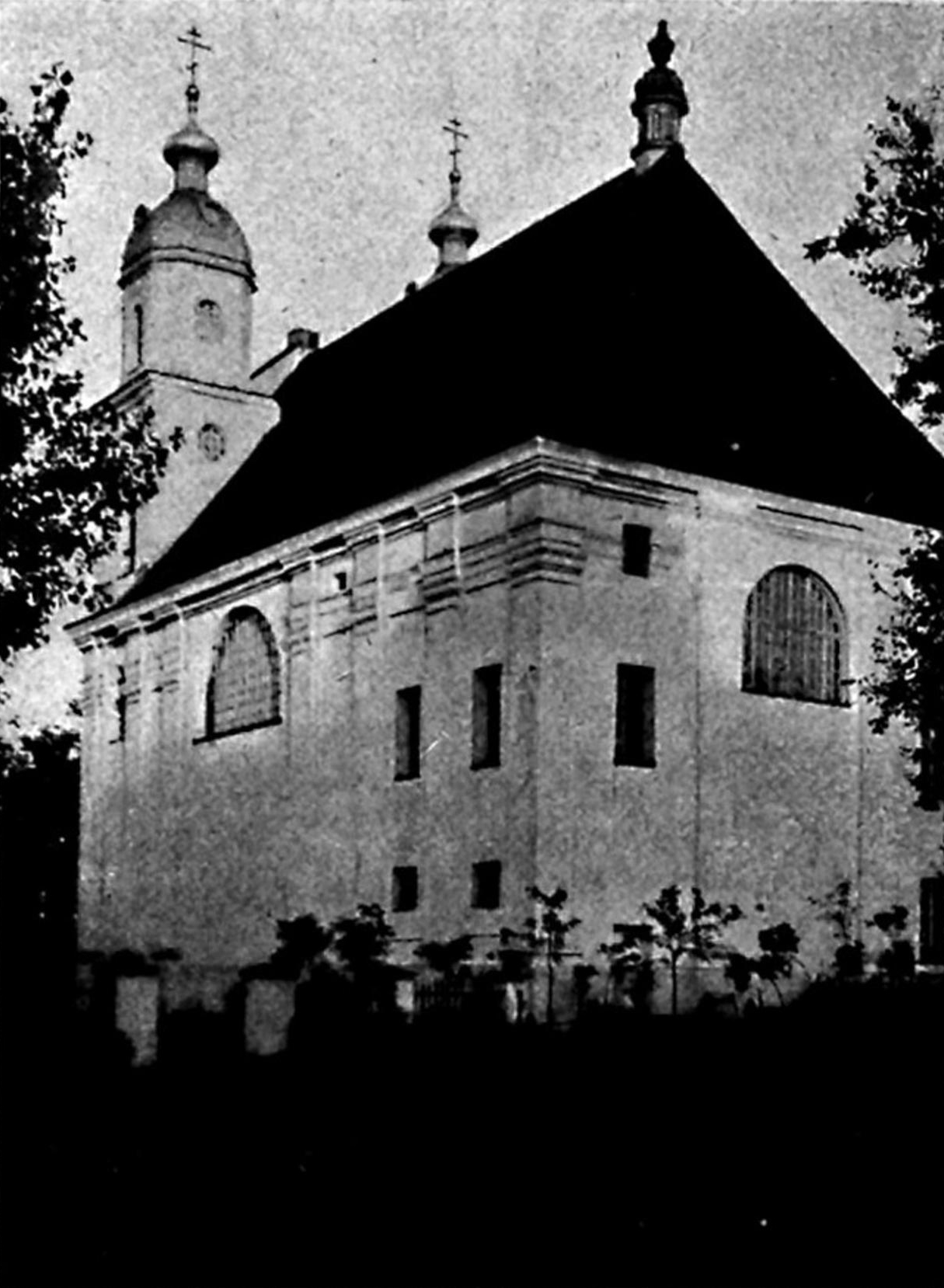
Back-view of the church in 1916

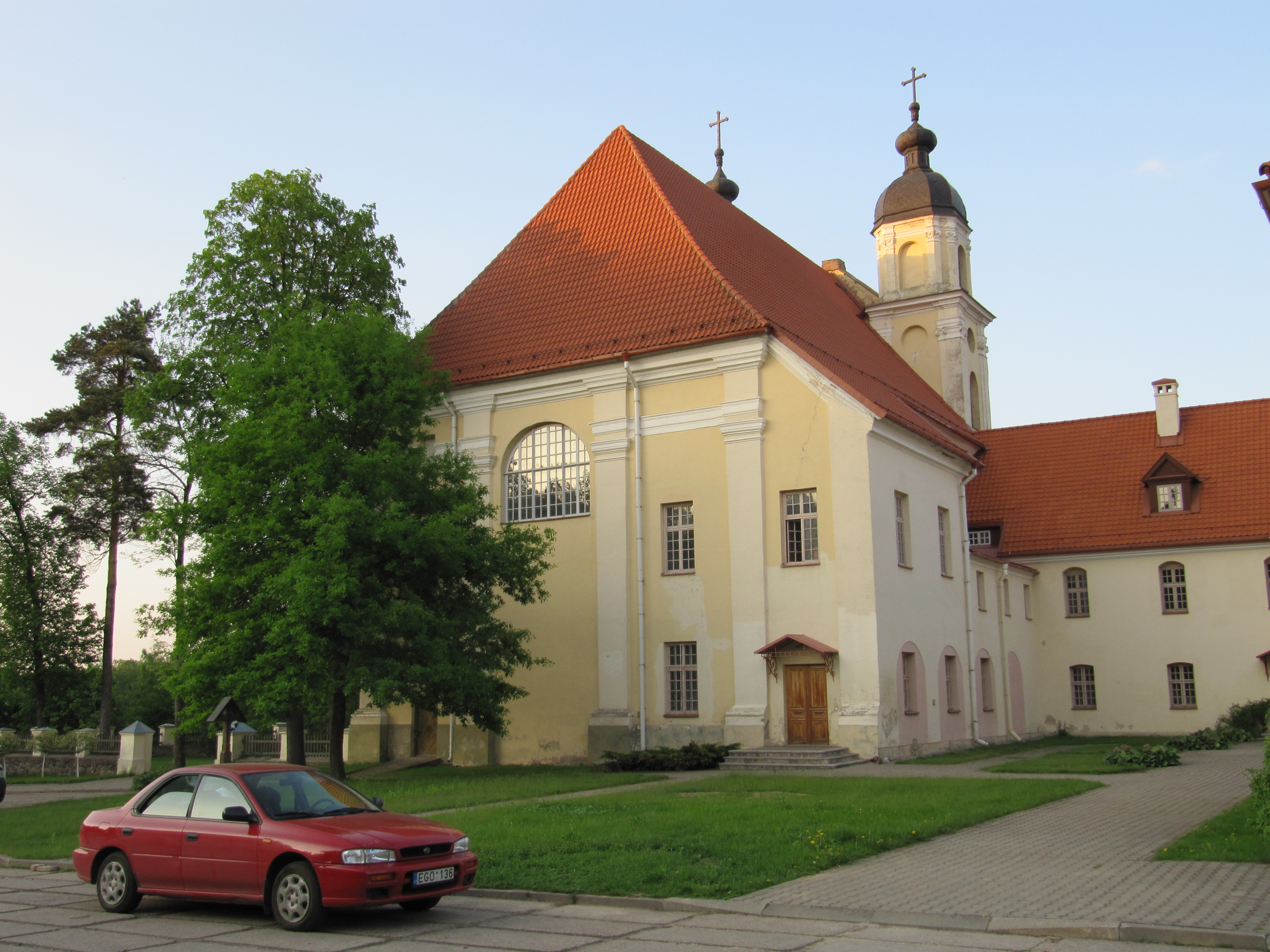
Back-view of the church in 2011

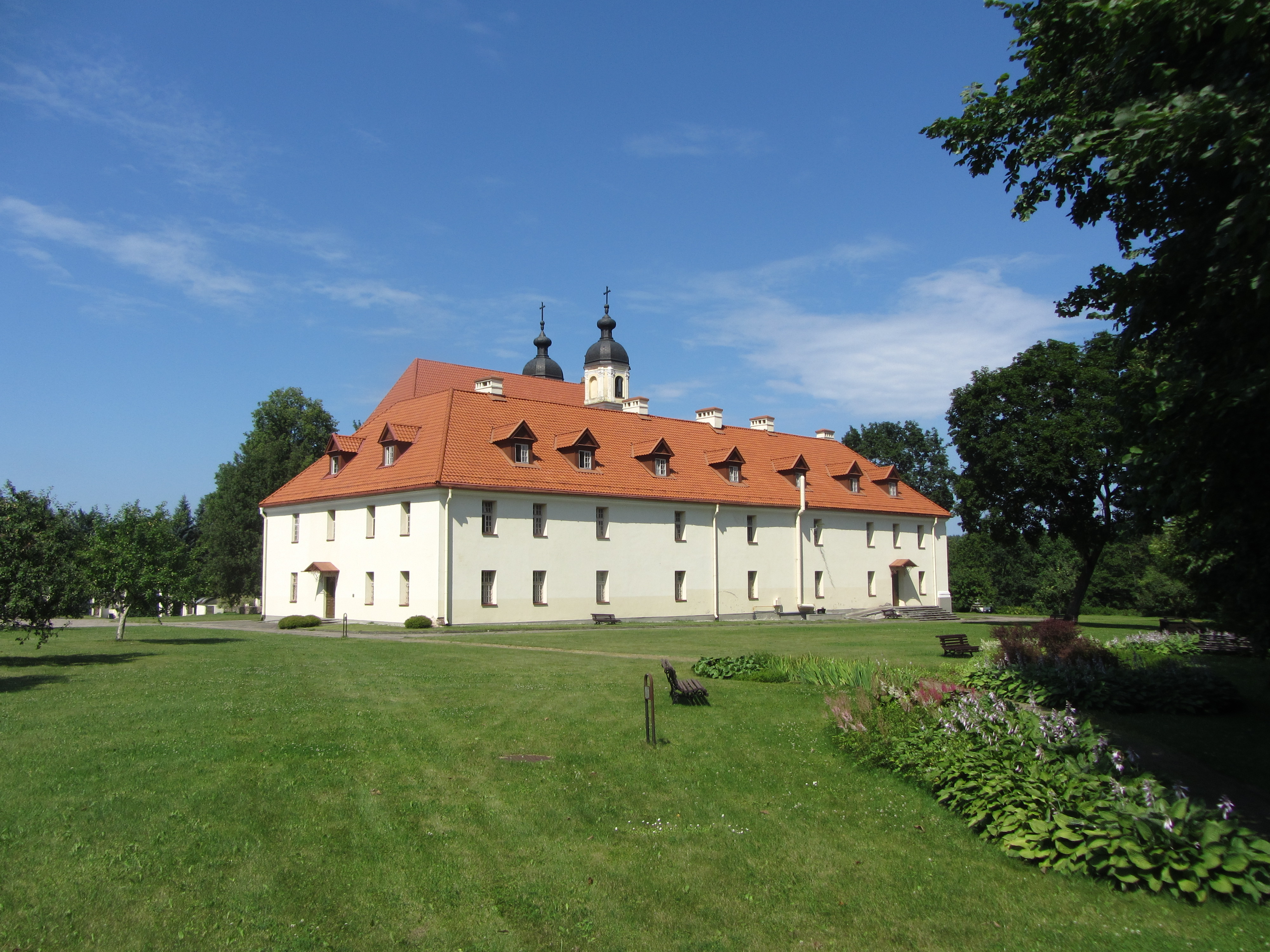
Monastery building near the church in 2014

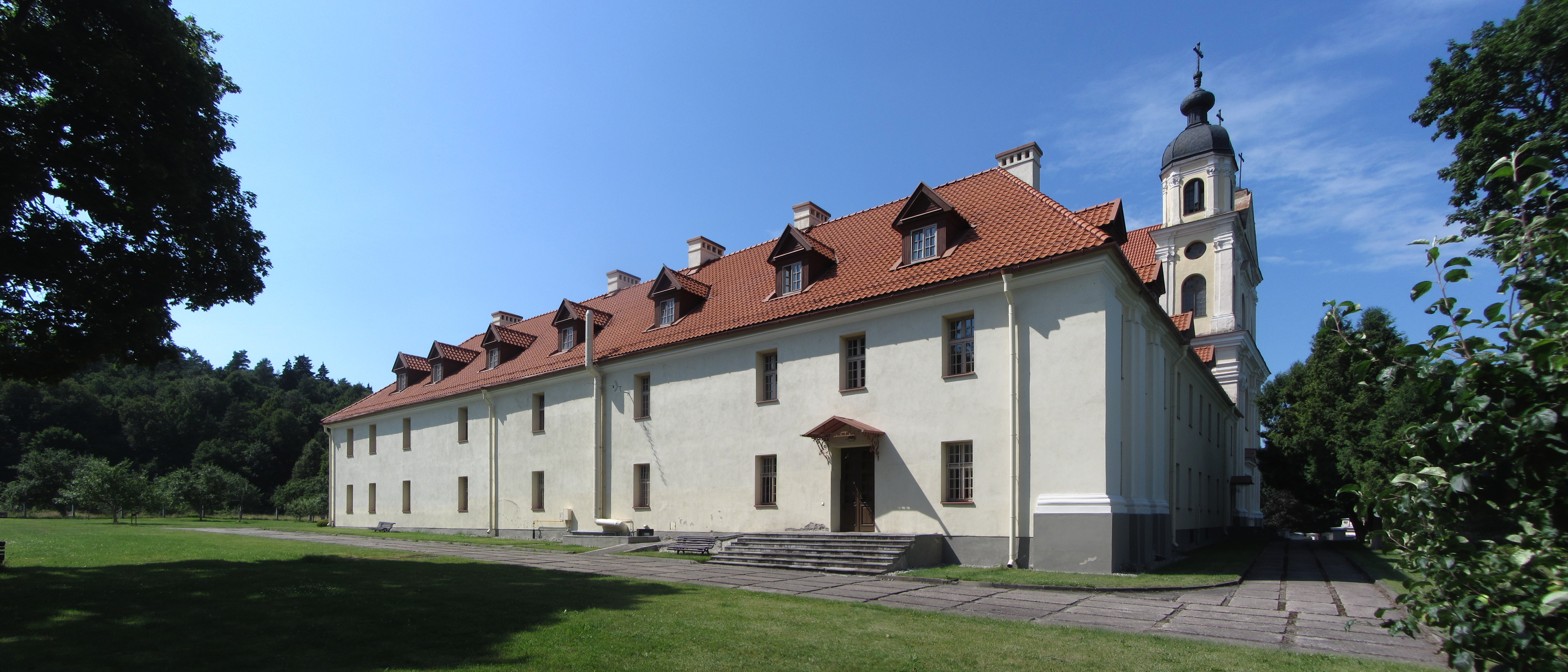
Monastery building near the church in 2014
