= Konstantinas Olšauskas =

Lithuanian diplomat (1867–1933)

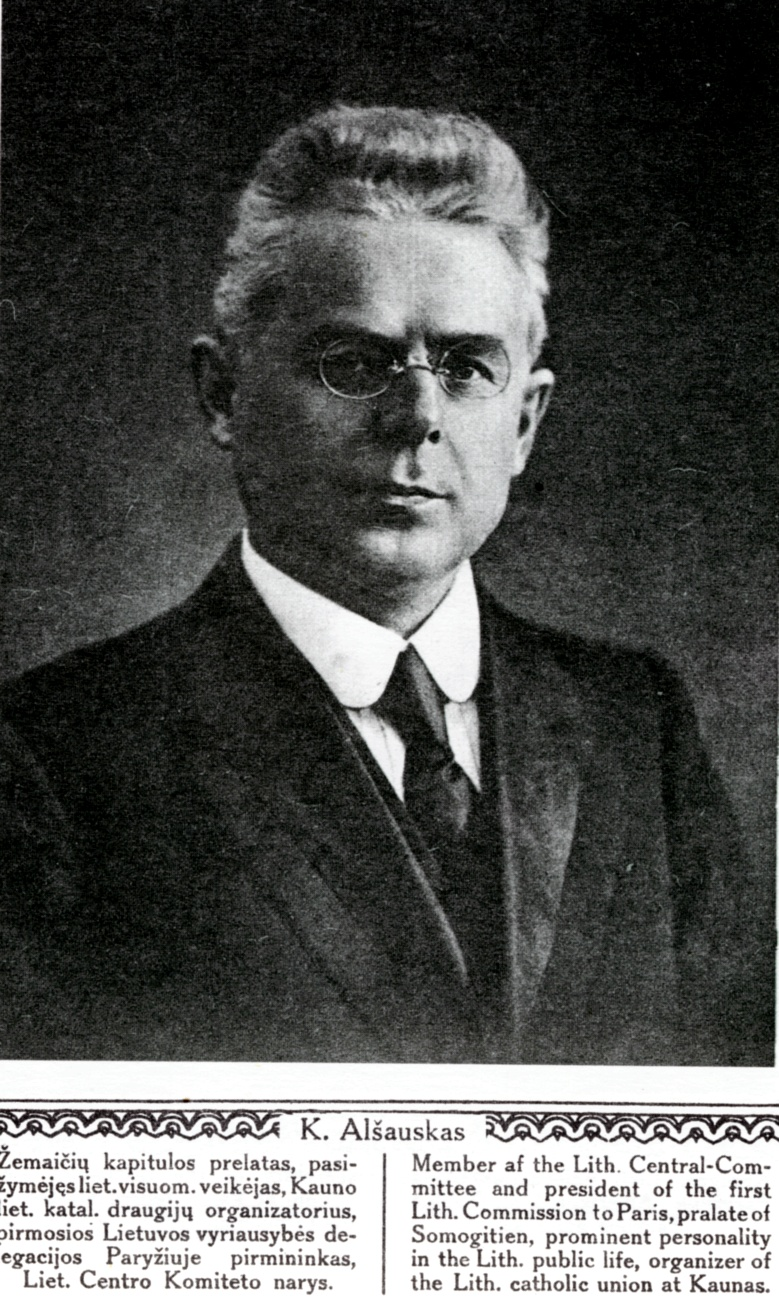
- Olšauskas in Lithuanian Album (1921)
- Born: 22 April 1867; Burbaičiai, Plungė, Russian Empire
- Died: 18 June 1933 (aged 66); Laukžemė, Kretinga, Lithuania
- Resting place: Plungė Old Cemetery
- Other names: Kastantinas or Kostas Olšauskis, Alšauskas, or Alšauskis
- Education: Kaunas Priest Seminary; Saint Petersburg Roman Catholic Theological Academy
- Occupation: Catholic priest
- Relatives: Brother-in-law General Stasys Dirmantas

Konstantinas Olšauskas (1867–1933) was a Lithuanian Roman Catholic priest active in public life and convicted of murder in 1929.

After graduating from the Saint Petersburg Roman Catholic Theological Academy in 1892, he was assigned as a chaplain to the Liepāja Gymnasium and parish priest in Debeikiai and Rozalimas where he joined the Lithuanian cultural life and helped distribute the banned Lithuanian books. In 1904, on the eve of the Russian Revolution of 1905, he was transferred to the Holy Cross Church, Kaunas. In Kaunas, Olšauskas organized the Workers' Society of St. Joseph as a counterbalance for various socialist organizations. He became the long-term chairman of the Saulė Society that organized and maintained Lithuanian schools in the Kovno Governorate. For three months in 1911, Olšauskas and Juozas Tumas-Vaižgantas toured Lithuanian American communities collecting donations for the construction of Saulė headquarters that was completed in 1914. Olšauskas also joined the Lithuanian and Belarusian Constitutional Catholic Party, established by Bishop Eduard von der Ropp, and was this party's candidate to the First State Duma. He also joined the Society of Saint Zita and Society of Saint Casimir, and helped publishing Viltis newspaper.

After the outbreak of World War I, he joined the Lithuanian Society for the Relief of War Sufferers and organized Lithuanian school evacuation to Voronezh. He organized funding and operations of ten different Lithuanian educational institutions in Voronezh until allegations of misappropriation of funds forced him to resign in September 1916. Olšauskas obtained permission for the Lithuanian Day from Pope Benedict XV for a worldwide donation drive in churches for the benefit of Lithuanian war refugees. In Lausanne, Switzerland, he chaired a six-person committee organizing the drive on 20 May 1917 that raised an estimated 1 million litas. He worked with the Council of Lithuania to negotiate German recognition of independent Lithuania and briefly represented Lithuania at the Paris Peace Conference. Olšauskas returned to Lithuania in spring 1919. He became a prelate and chaplain of Kaunas Cathedral. He returned to the Society Saulė organizing various schools and later defending them from the authoritarian regime of Antanas Smetona.

Olšauskas became the primary suspect in the murder of Stanislava Danilovičiūtė-Ustijanauskienė on 16 September 1928. He was arrested in March 1929 and sentenced to six years imprisonment in October 1929. The case caused a media frenzy in Lithuania. Church officials refused to defrock Olšauskas or take his case to the Church Tribunal. His continued imprisonment violated the Concordat of 1927 that specified that active members of the clergy were to be imprisoned separately and tried by an ecclesiastical court. Thus, Olšauskas received a presidential pardon and was released in February 1931. He lost his house to a suspected arson in February 1932 and was shot dead in June 1933. A local man confessed to the murder but never adequately explained his motives.

== Biography ==
=== Early life and career ===
Olšauskas was born on 22 April 1867 to family of well-off Lithuanian farmers. As such, the family had adopted Polish culture and often spoke Polish at home. He attended Russian primary schools in Plungė and Tauragė and the Gymnasium in Liepāja. In 1884–1888, he studied at the Kaunas Priest Seminary. His schoolmates included Jonas Mačiulis-Maironis, Juozas Tumas-Vaižgantas, Kazimieras Pakalniškis (Dėdė Atanazas), Aleksandras Dambrauskas-Jakštas. As a gifted student, he was sent to the Saint Petersburg Roman Catholic Theological Academy which he graduated in 1892 with a master's degree in theology.

On 12 April 1892, Olšauskas was ordained priest and assigned as chaplain of the Gymnasium in Liepāja. There Olšauskas joined the resistance to the Lithuanian press ban – he would receive prohibited books from Juozapas Viksva, priest in Palanga, and would distribute the books among the Lithuanian students and other activists. In 1894, Olšauskas supported Catholic gymnasium students in their protest against mandatory Eastern Orthodox services in honor of Tsar Nicholas II of Russia.

In fall 1894, he was assigned to Debeikiai where he was joined by his younger brother and sister. He hired Stanislava Danilovičiūtė, a graduate of the Riga Gymnasium, as their private tutor starting a relationship that ended in both of their murders. In 1899, he was transferred to Rozalimas where he worked until 1904. Rumors spread that the transfer was due to the inappropriately close relationship between Danilovičiūtė and Olšauskas. Olšauskas continued to distribute the banned press, taught children in Lithuanian, organized church repairs, established a shelter for the elderly, advocated teetotalism. In 1904, on the eve of the Russian Revolution of 1905, he was transferred to the Holy Cross Church, Kaunas.

=== Various societies in Kaunas ===
Olšauskas' new parish in Kaunas had many poor workers of the nearby factories. Therefore, he adopted ideas of the Catholic social teaching laid out in the Rerum novarum, encyclical issued by Pope Leo XIII in 1891. On 1 June 1906, he founded the Workers' Society of St. Joseph (Lithuanian: Šv. Juozapo darbininkų draugija) as a counterbalance to various socialist and revolutionary societies. About 1,000 workers, both Poles and Lithuanians, signed up. The society organized lectures, operated a small library and reading room, staged music and theater performances, provided financial assistance in case of an accident, etc. Socialists viewed the society as a treason to the revolution and accused Olšauskas of loyalty to the Tsar and being too friendly with Tsarist authorities (he knew the Governor of Kaunas since they were neighbors in Debeikiai). In 1907, when revolutionary moods dissipated, Olšauskas attempted to introduce Lithuanian language and agenda to the St. Joseph Society but was met with passionate protests. He resigned as chairman in September 1907 and soon the society split into three based on ethnic lines: Polish, Lithuanian, and Polish–Lithuanian.

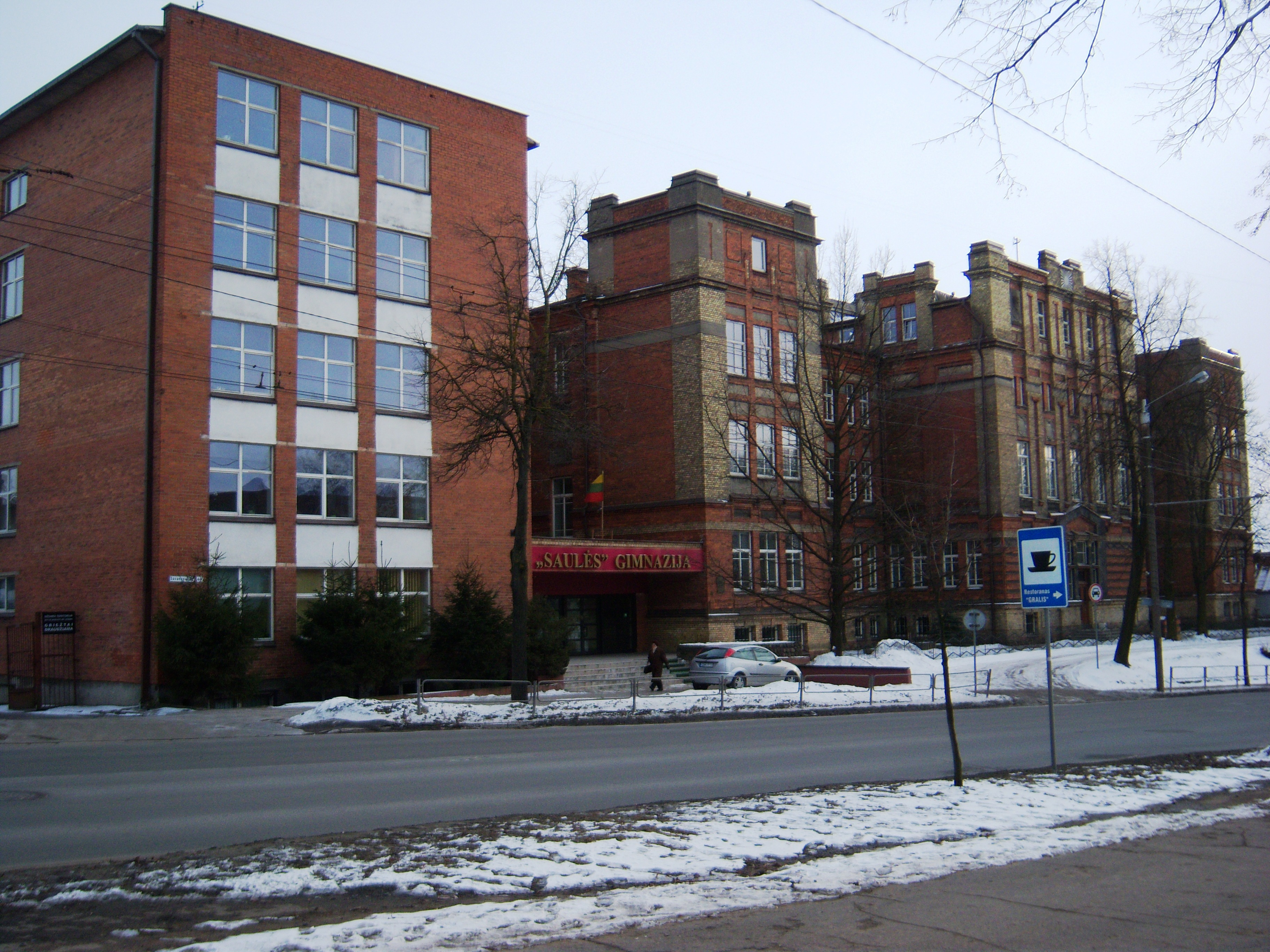
Saulė headquarters completed in 1914 (photo from 2013)

After the Russian Revolution of 1905, the Tsarist authorities removed some of the restrictions on education in the native language. Legal Lithuanian-language schools became a possibility. The first Lithuanian primary schools were established in Šančiai, Žaliakalnis, and by the Holy Cross Church in summer 1906. On 12 June 1906, Olšauskas and others established Saulė Society (officially registered on 25 July) to organize and maintain further Lithuanian schools in the Kaunas Governorate. The society's program was quickly revised to emphasize that it is a Catholic organization open only to Catholics. Olšauskas was elected its chairman in September 1906. Saulė quickly organized primary schools and they numbered 45 by 1910. Local chapters were encouraged to establish libraries and reading rooms. Saulė also organized training courses for teachers and bookkeepers. In 1911, Olšauskas and Juozas Tumas-Vaižgantas toured 55 Lithuanian American communities for three months to collect donations for the construction of Saulė headquarters in Žaliakalnis. They collected about $19,000 (equivalent to $657,000 in 2025) or 34,000 rubles. More donations were collected in Lithuania and the headquarters, a three-storey brick building at a cost of 155,000 rubles, was completed in 1914.

Olšauskas also joined the Lithuanian and Belarusian Constitutional Catholic Party, established by Bishop Eduard von der Ropp, and was this party's candidate to the first State Duma. In advance of the Great Seimas of Vilnius, he also worked on the program for the Lithuanian Christian Democratic Party, but the party was established only 1917. Olšauskas supported and was board member of the Society of Saint Zita for Lithuanian female servants and Society of Saint Casimir for book publishing. When newspaper Vilniaus žinios was discontinued due to financial difficulties, Olšauskas and others decided to establish new newspaper Viltis. Olšauskas was elected to the council of a credit union established by Saliamonas Banaitis and lawyer Antanas Petraitis in October 1911. Olšauskas also wanted to establish an organization advocating against Lithuanian emigration to United States, but plans were interrupted by World War I. Due to his various activities, Russian police kept an eye on Olšauskas. He was tried in January 1910 for the failure to comply with a circular of the Ministry of Internal Affairs that mandated a certain registration procedure for those wishing to convert from Eastern Orthodoxy to Catholicism. Olšauskas was one of about 400 members of the clergy facing the same charges. He defended himself and was acquitted.

In 1914, Pranciškus Karevičius, new Bishop of Samogitia, appointed several Lithuanian priests, including Olšauskas, to the capitula. These appointments were protested by the Polish clergy and Karevičius had to explain himself to cardinal Eugenio Pacelli.

=== Lithuanian Society for the Relief of War Sufferers ===
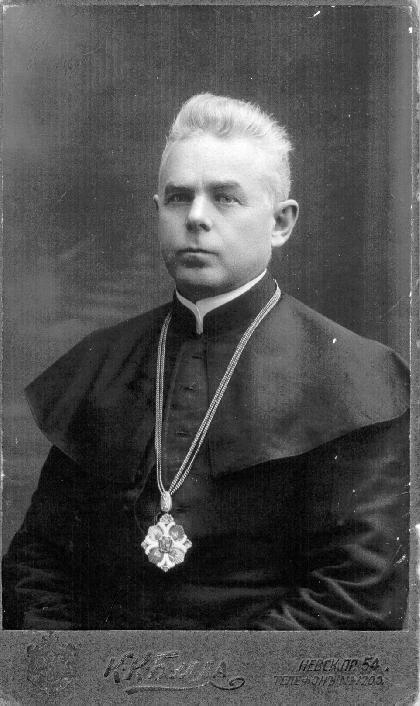
Olšauskas in 1916

At the start of World War I, Olšauskas and several others, as politically unreliable persons, were deported from Kaunas to Vilnius by the commandant of the Kaunas Fortress. He worked to reestablish Saulė educational courses in Vilnius and succeeded getting government permission only in the name of Antanas Vileišis. The Lithuanian Society for the Relief of War Sufferers was officially registered on 27 November and its founding meeting took place on 4 December 1914, and Olšauskas was elected to its Central Committee. As a member of the Lithuanian Society, he worked on establishing local society chapters in towns and villages (including Skuodas, Šiauliai, Kuliai, Tverai, Tryškiai), headed an informational bureau, organized shelters–workshops for youth, evacuated Saulė pedagogical courses to Vilnius, etc.

In March 1915, Olšauskas and Petras Leonas petitioned Kazimierz Mikołaj Michalkiewicz, administrator of the Diocese of Vilnius, to allow Lithuanian-language services and Spiritual Exercises of Ignatius of Loyola in the Churches of St. Peter and St. Paul and Holy Spirit, but were refused. When Archbishop of Mohilev refused to intervene, Olšauskas responded by placing a public advertisement in the Russian newspaper Vilensky Vestnik – since the Diocese of Vilnius did not care about the faithful, he was searching for a hall large enough to accommodate 1,500 people. It was an insult to Michalkiewicz who suspended Olšauskas from performing masses or other duties and threatened other priests. Three priests heeded Michalkiewicz's warnings and resigned from the Lithuanian Society. However, Lithuanian public started sending protest letters and Michalkiewicz was forced to relent. Lithuanian language was allowed not only at the St. Peter and St. Paul, but in other churches as well.

In summer 1915, Olšauskas together with Juozas Vokietaitis and Juozas Balčikonis toured Russian cities Oryol, Smolensk, Kursk looking for a suitable location to evacuate Lithuanian schools. They chose Voronezh, and the city became a center of Lithuanian education in Russia – there were ten different Lithuanian schools in the city, 16 dormitories, and about 1,500 students. Olšauskas became the official representative of the Lithuanian Society in Voronezh and organized school work: located premises for lectures and dormitories, arranged food and clothing, coordinated the financial support from the Tatiana Committee. Olšauskas became known as a strict enforcer of Catholic ideas and supporter of mandatory mass attendance attracting criticism from socialist-sympathizing activists. The schools received substantial sums from the Tatiana Committee that allowed to provided students with full room and board. Soon rumors began spreading that Olšauskas misused the funds – he purchased inferior goods at a premium from certain Labkauskienė. The situation was inspected by Antanas Tumėnas, Jurgis Baltrušaitis, and Zigmas Žemaitis. The issue was discussed by the Lithuanian Society in April 1916 and Olšauskas was prohibited from purchasing goods from Labkauskienė. Before the prohibition took effect, Olšauskas purchased the full inventory of Labkauskienė. The episode dealt a major blow to his reputation. In June, he took a 1.5 month-long vacation to improve health at a Lithuanian sanatorium in Yalta and resigned from his position in Voronezh effective 1 September 1916.

=== Donation drive on the Lithuanian Day ===
On 18 September 1916, Martynas Yčas, chairman of the Lithuanian Society, offered Olšauskas to take up the issue of the Lithuanian Day when Catholic churches worldwide would collect donations to support Lithuanian war refugees. Similar days had already been declared by Pope Benedict XV for Poland and Belgium. Lithuanian activists had already petitioned the pope (by Juozas Gabrys in early 1915 and Yčas in summer 1916), but the pope asked to see a joint petition of Lithuanian bishops. Such joint letter proved impossible to obtain, but Olšauskas was able to persuade the pope and the Lithuanian Day was scheduled for 20 May 1917.

With the papal permission in hand, Olšauskas departed to Lausanne, Switzerland, to organize the Lithuanian Day. He chaired a six-person committee that prepared, translated into various languages, and distributed the appeal to be read in churches. To further support the effort, Olšauskas went to Spain and Portugal to meet with the Archbishops of Toledo and Lisbon. In France, he received a cold welcome from the French cardinal Léon-Adolphe Amette. President Raymond Poincaré promised to organize the collection via the Red Cross but it appears the effort was not successful. Olšauskas wanted to establish a French–Lithuanian Society and invited writers René Bazin and Étienne Lamy among others, but they refused. France was allied with Poland, and many of the French activists accused Lithuanians of separatism. Olšauskas received help from poet Fernand Mazade in publishing the appeal and other articles about Lithuania in the French press. These visits made Olšauskas realize that Western powers knew and cared little about Lithuanian affairs and that formed the basis for his later pro-German attitude.

Treasurer Vladas Daumantas did not produce a report on the collected funds and thus the total amount is not known, but is estimated at 1 million litas.

=== Political work for Lithuania's independence ===
In Switzerland, a neutral country, Lithuanians were able to establish organizations that discussed and developed Lithuanian political aspirations after the war. Juozas Gabrys ran the Lithuanian Information Bureau. Lithuanians also organized Council of the Lithuanian Nation, which was supposed to represent the Lithuanian nation, during the second conference in Lausanne in summer 1916. In spring 1917, Germans devised a plan to form a network of formally independent states that would in fact be completely dependent on Germany, the so-called Mitteleuropa. To effectuate the plan, Germans needed local collaborators. Friedrich von der Ropp, a noble from Panevėžys area, reached out to Swiss Lithuanians and later to Lithuanians in Vilnius. He proposed a 12-member Vertrauensrat ("Council of Trust" or "Confidential Council"), chaired by Olšauskas, which would include Antanas Smetona and Jonas Basanavičius. Lithuanians refused and insisted on an elected council.

In August 1917, Matthias Erzberger, influential deputy of the Reichstag, proposed to Olšauskas to establish a constitutional monarchy in Lithuania that would join a personal union with the German Empire (i.e. Kingdom of Lithuania). Erzberger also promised to promote a Lithuanian bishop (i.e. Olšauskas) to the Diocese of Vilnius and to help reestablishing Lithuanian educational societies Saulė, Rytas, and Žiburys. Olšauskas attended the Vilnius Conference in September 1917 and reported on Erzberger's proposal. To avoid the police, he traveled under a fake passport (last name: von Oldenburg) but was held up in Berlin and arrived late on 20 September (the conference was held on 18–22 September). He also brought about 150,000 rubles for refugee relief. The conference elected the 20-member Council of Lithuania, which authorized Olšauskas as its representative abroad.

From Vilnius, Olšauskas departed to Stockholm to attend a conference with Lithuanian representatives from Russia and United States in October 1917. The conference adopted a resolution that recognized the Council of Lithuania as the sole representative of the Lithuanian nation. From Sweden, he traveled to Berlin to meet with Matthias Erzberger and to Colmar to meet with Wilhelm Karl, Duke of Urach, the proposed monarch for Lithuania. Olšauskas became chairman of the Council of the Lithuanian Nation in Switzerland during a conference in Bern in November 1917. From there, Olšauskas departed to Germany to discuss the recognition of Lithuania's independence. In the meantime, the Council of Lithuania adopted the German-dictated Act of 11 December which called for "a firm and permanent alliance" with Germany. Still, Germany did not recognize independent Lithuania. On 26–28 January 1918, Olšauskas participated in sessions of the Council of Lithuania as an advisor. Together with Bishop Pranciškus Karevičius, he was sent as a Lithuanian delegate to the Brest-Litovsk negotiations that ended Russia's participation in World War I. In Berlin, they met with German Chancellor Georg von Hertling and General Erich Ludendorff on 11 February. Eventually, Germany recognized independent Lithuania on 23 March. Olšauskas more often resided in Berlin and continued to represent the Council of Lithuania in Germany but his relationship with the council was soured by a conflict between Juozas Gabrys and Augustinas Voldemaras.

=== Candidate for the Bishop of Vilnius and Paris Peace Conference ===
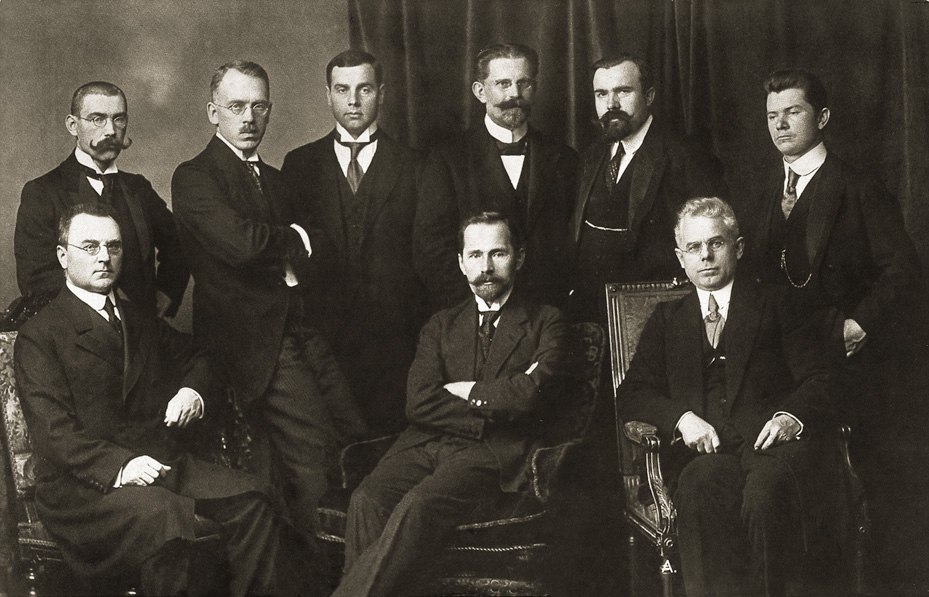
Olšauskas (sitting on the right) with a delegation of the Council of Lithuania in Berlin

Lithuanians long wanted to replace Kazimierz Mikołaj Michalkiewicz, administrator of the Diocese of Vilnius, with a more pro-Lithuanian candidate. An opportunity arose while conducting negotiations with Germany. Olšauskas was recommended to Pope Benedict XV by German Chancellor Georg von Hertling and diplomat Matthias Erzberger in fall 1917. He was also supported by the Council of Lithuania, and Juozas Purickis collected 200 signatures of priests in his support. According to Vladas Mironas, Olšauskas even harbored a scheme to invite Spanish prince Alfonso as King of Lithuania and with his help become the bishop. In June 1918, Michalkiewicz led a procession during the Corpus Christi celebration that had banners with Polish slogans such as "God Save Poland" and "Almighty, Return Freedom to Our Homeland". Thus, a religious procession became a political demonstration. The incident was used by the Germans as a pretext to expel Michalkiewicz from Vilnius to the Maria Laach Abbey in Rhineland-Palatinate on 19 June and to force the pope to make changes in the diocese. However, Olšauskas due to his pro-German and anti-Polish attitudes was not an acceptable candidate to the Holy See. The pope appointed Jurgis Matulaitis-Matulevičius as the new bishop in October 1918.

After the failure to become bishop, Olšauskas eyed the position of the Minister of Education in the newly formed government of Augustinas Voldemaras. Instead, he was sent as the Lithuanian delegate to the Paris Peace Conference. His primary goal was to obtain diplomatic recognition as well as financial and military support for Lithuania. Olšauskas together with representatives of minorities in Lithuania – Simon Yakovlevich Rosenbaum (Jewish), Dominik Semashko (Belarusian), and Jurgis Daujotas (Polish) – arrived to Paris in early January 1919 and already found Lithuanians working there – priest Adomas Vilimavičius, engineer Ernestas Galvanauskas, and poet Oscar Milosz. They were soon joined by Juozas Gabrys. Thus, there were three Lithuanian groups that sometimes competed with each other. On 6 January, Le Temps published an interview with Rosenbaum who expressed opinions contrary to Lithuanian positions. Due to these misunderstandings, Olšauskas was quickly replaced by Augustinas Voldemaras and returned to Lithuania at the end of March. During the short time, Olšauskas was received by French Prime Minister Georges Clemenceau and introduced Lithuanian issues to other European diplomats.

=== Back in Lithuania ===
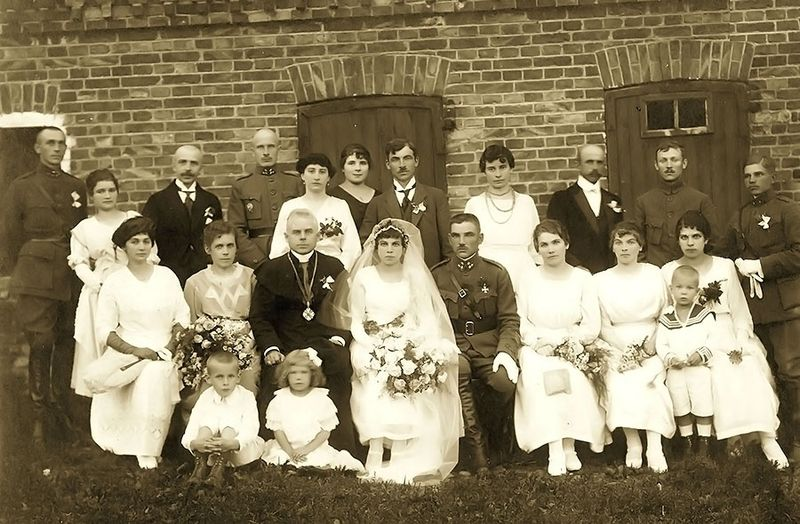
Olšauskas (sitting third from left) with a newlywed couple in 1924

Olšauskas returned to Lithuania in spring 1919. He became a prelate and chaplain of Kaunas Cathedral. He returned to the Saulė Society as chairman and helped finding funding for the various Lithuanian schools – now that government permission was not an issue, the society organized gymnasiums in Kaunas and Telšiai and 11 pro-gymnasiums in Biržai, Utena, Ukmergė, etc. To address the shortage of qualified teachers, the society organized two-year pedagogical courses in Jurbarkas, Utena, Žagarė, Vilkija. After the coup d'état of 1926, authoritarian regime of President Antanas Smetona began limiting and nationalizing private Catholic schools in an effort to weaken the opposition, including the Lithuanian Christian Democratic Party. Olšauskas campaigned against such government actions and harshly criticized Smetona.

Together with others, in 1913, he purchased a manor in Laukžemė (a total of 600 hectares (1,500 acres)). He retained a piece of the manor and had a sawmill that employed 10 people. He was one of the shareholders of the Trade and Industry Bank of Lithuania, established by Martynas Yčas and other prominent Lithuanians, that went bankrupt in 1927. In 1922, Olšauskas and others established Galybė (might), a company that envisioned hydroelectric power plants on the Neris and Neman Rivers. In February 1923, its capital was 2.5 million litas. To raise further capital, Olšauskas and engineer Vladas Pauliukonis traveled to United States and sold shares for about $50,000 (equivalent to $945,000 in 2025). The company, however, failed to obtain concessions from the Lithuanian government. After the death of his brother Paulius, Olšauskas disputed the inheritance with his sister-in-law.

=== Murder of Stanislava Danilovičiūtė-Ustijanauskienė ===
On 16 September 1928, the body of Stanislava Danilovičiūtė-Ustijanauskienė was found strangled on Vytautas Hill in Birštonas. At the time, Olšauskas was undergoing a treatment in the town. Just nine days later, Latvian newspaper Jaunākās Ziņas published a sensational story on how a priest murdered a woman. Other newspapers, particularly Lietuvos žinios and Lietuvos ūkininkas, followed suit and began reporting tabloid-style news from the investigation and trial. On 23 March 1929, Olšauskas was arrested and imprisoned in Kaunas Prison as the primary murder suspect. Two other suspects – Ustijanauskienė's son-in-law and a school director that she had accused of seducing one of his students – had an alibi. The trial took place on 1–13 October 1929 and included over 100 witnesses. Olšauskas was defended by Petras Leonas and Antanas Tumėnas.

Olšauskas and Ustijanauskienė met in 1894 in Debeikiai when she was hired as a tutor for Olšauskas' siblings. According to the court findings, they developed a romantic relationship and Ustijanauskienė became pregnant with son Ričardas (supposedly born in 1899). The boy was allegedly sent to United States; he returned to Europe as a World War I volunteer and died in the Western Front in 1917. However, the court never conclusively proved that the son ever existed. Ustijanauskienė moved around a lot, but kept corresponding and meeting with Olšauskas up until her murder. In the post-war years, Olšauskas sent her monthly payments of 200–400 rubles. He stated that these were repayments of a 3,000-ruble loan she made in 1911 or 1915 and support to a financially struggling woman. According to the court, Ustijanauskienė had a folder of compromising documents that she used to extort money from Olšauskas. Supposedly, they were to meet on Vytautas Hill to exchange the documents for a sum of money. The entire case was based on circumstantial evidence and hearsay.

=== Prison sentence, release, and murder ===
Kaunas district court found Olšauskas guilty and sentenced him to eight years imprisonment, but due to his service to the Lithuanian state the sentence was reduced to six years. He was also ordered to pay a monthly sum of 300 litas for the support of Ustijanauskienė's son Antanas (born 1915) until his majority. The Lithuanian Tribunal upheld the sentence in spring 1930 only reducing the monthly support payments to 200 litas. The trial and imprisonment of Olšauskas, who continued to be priest, violated the Concordat of 1927 that specified that active members of the clergy were to be imprisoned separately and tried by an ecclesiastical court or defrocked. Church officials refused to defrock Olšauskas or take his case to Church Tribunal. It was a political and legal deadlock. However, the church also did not take a more active role in defending Olšauskas perhaps because it was involved in a financial dispute with him. In early 1929, Olšauskas as a procurator withdrew his own funds from the capitula which the church contended was illegal. The case was resolved in Olšauskas' favor only with the intervention of the Holy See.

Olšauskas, after resigning as prelate, received a presidential pardon and was released from prison on 16 February 1931. He departed to Rome to defend his name and undergo a treatment, but had to return to Lithuania due to financial difficulties (all his property was frozen by the state). In February 1932, his house in Laukžemė burned down in a suspected arson. Every Sunday, he would travel to Palanga to attend mass. On 18 June 1933, on his way home, he was shot dead near Būtingė. It was a single shot straight to the heart from a previously prepared hideout. Juozas Žilius, starosta of Laukžemė, confessed to the murder but never adequately explained his motives. There were speculations that the men fought over property rights. Žilius reportedly said that the society was better off without people like Olšauskas who was a bad and vengeful person.

A different version of the murder was developed after the trial. In 1930, Stepas Vilkickas was sentenced to death for espionage against Lithuania. While in prison, he reportedly wrote memoirs where he described that Ustijanauskienė was murdered by a Polish agent. She could have spied on her daughter and son-in-law who were close friends with Joachim Klein, German attaché in Lithuania, but became too talkative. Proponents of this version also tie in Olšauskas's murder – he kept investigating to clear his name and had come too close to the truth.

== Legacy ==
Olšauskas was a frequent political target. Already in 1918, Vaclovas Biržiška published 37-page booklet in Voronezh attacking Olšauskas as an enemy of workers and defender of the Tsarist regime. During the murder trial, correspondent of Lietuvos žinios published a sensationalized booklet on Olšauskas' life in Chicago. In 1961, during an anti-religious campaign in the Soviet Union, journalist Jonas Kauneckis published a book that portrayed Olšauskas as cruel, greedy, arrogant, and morally bankrupt. In 1980s, a new anti-religious campaign was launched by Yuri Andropov and Olšauskas's case was remembered again. In 1984, Lithuanian Television produced a two-part film Nine Circles of Downfall (Devyni nuopuolio ratai) directed by Bronius Talačka based on Kauneckas' book. A book defending Olšauskas was published by Juozas Šalčius and alumni of Saulė Society in Chicago in 1985. In 2013, Vida Pukienė published a monograph that focused on Olšauskas's life and activities prior to the murder scandal.

== Bibliography ==
- Demm, Eberhard (2005). "Gabrys, Juozas (1880–1951)". In Tucker, Spencer C.; Roberts, Priscilla Mary (eds.). The Encyclopedia of World War I: A Political, Social, and Military History. ABC-CLIO. ISBN 978-1-85109-420-2.
- Dykovienė, Asta (2015-07-11). "Kodėl nužudė K. Olšauską?" (in Lithuanian). Kauno diena. Klaipėda / Miesto pulsas.
- Eidintas, Alfonsas; Žalys, Vytautas; Senn, Alfred Erich (1999). Tuskenis, Edvardas (ed.). Lithuania in European Politics: The Years of the First Republic, 1918-1940 (Paperback ed.). New York: St. Martin's Press. ISBN 0-312-22458-3.
- Gaigalaitė, Aldona; Žeimantienė, Jūratė (2004). Juozas Purickis-Vygandas (in Lithuanian). Vilnius: Vilniaus knyga. ISBN 9955-490-27-6.
- Górski, Tadeusz (1975). "Kazimierz Mikołaj Michalkiewicz". Polish Biographical Dictionary (in Polish). Vol. 20. Archived from the original on 8 June 2020.
- Grigaravičius, Algirdas (2000). "Ką nuveikė Konstantinas Olšauskas (1)". Kultūros barai (in Lithuanian). 11 (432). ISSN 0134-3106.
- Grigaravičius, Algirdas (2000a). "Ką nuveikė Konstantinas Olšauskas (2)". Kultūros barai (in Lithuanian). 12 (433). ISSN 0134-3106.
- Grigaravičius, Algirdas (2001). "Ką nuveikė Konstantinas Olšauskas (3)". Kultūros barai (in Lithuanian). 1 (434). ISSN 0134-3106.
- Kniūraitė, Vida (2014). "Recenzija. Prelatas Konstantinas Olšauskas: visuomenės veikėjo tragedija" (PDF). Soter (in Lithuanian). 49 (77). ISSN 2335-8785.
- Lukšas, Aras (12 December 2008). "Paslaptingoji prelato drama" (in Lithuanian). Lietuvos žinios.
- Misiūnas, Remigijus (2004). Informacinių kovų kryžkelėse: JAV lietuvių informacinės kovos XIX a. pabaigoje – 1922 m. (in Lithuanian). Vilnius: Versus Aurius. ISBN 9955-601-39-6.
- Pukienė, Vida (2013). Prelatas Konstantinas Olšauskas: visuomenės veikėjo tragedija (PDF). Edukologija. ISBN 978-9955-20-884-6. Archived from the original (PDF) on 2018-08-11.
- Rinkšelis, Žilvinas. ""Saulės" gimnazija Kaune (Išlikęs, k.k.v.r. 10710)". Architektūros ir urbanistikos tyrimų centras (in Lithuanian). KTU Architektūros ir statybos institutas.
- Sperskienė, Rasa (3 February 2015). "Lietuvių draugijos nukentėjusiems dėl karo šelpti steigiamasis susirinkimas". Lietuvos visuomenė Pirmojo pasaulinio karo pradžioje: įvykiai, draugijos, asmenybės (in Lithuanian). Wroblewski Library of the Lithuanian Academy of Sciences.
- Terleckas, Vladas (2004). "Savitarpio kredito bendrovės (1873–1914 m.) ir jų veiklos bruožai" (PDF). Pinigų studijos (in Lithuanian). 3. ISSN 1392-2637.
