= Salomėja =

- Gender: Female
- Language: Lithuanian
- Name day: 19 August

Origin
- Region of origin: Lithuania

Other names
- Derived: Salome, daughter of Herod II
- Related names: Salome

Salomėja is a Lithuanian feminine given name. People bearing the name Salomėja include:

- Salomėja Nėris (1904–1945), Lithuanian poet
- Salomėja Stakauskaitė (1890–1971), Lithuanian educator and politician
- Salomėja Zaksaitė (born 1985), Lithuanian chess player
