= Matulionis =

Matulionis is a Lithuanian-language surname derived from Matulis. Notable people with the surname include:

- Algis Matulionis (born 1947), Soviet and Lithuanian actor and screenwriter
- Osvaldas Matulionis (born 1991), Lithuanian basketball player
- Teofilius Matulionis (1873–1962), Roman Catholic prelate
