= Matulis =

Matulis is a surname of Lithuanian origin. Notable people with this surname include:

- Adolph Matulis (1920–2002), American athlete
- Gintautas Matulis (born 1986), Lithuanian basketball player
- Jānis Matulis (1911–1985), Latvian Lutheran clergy
- Juozas Matulis (1899–1993), Lithuanian chemist
