= Liepāja Museum =

Museum in Latvia

- Liepājas muzejs
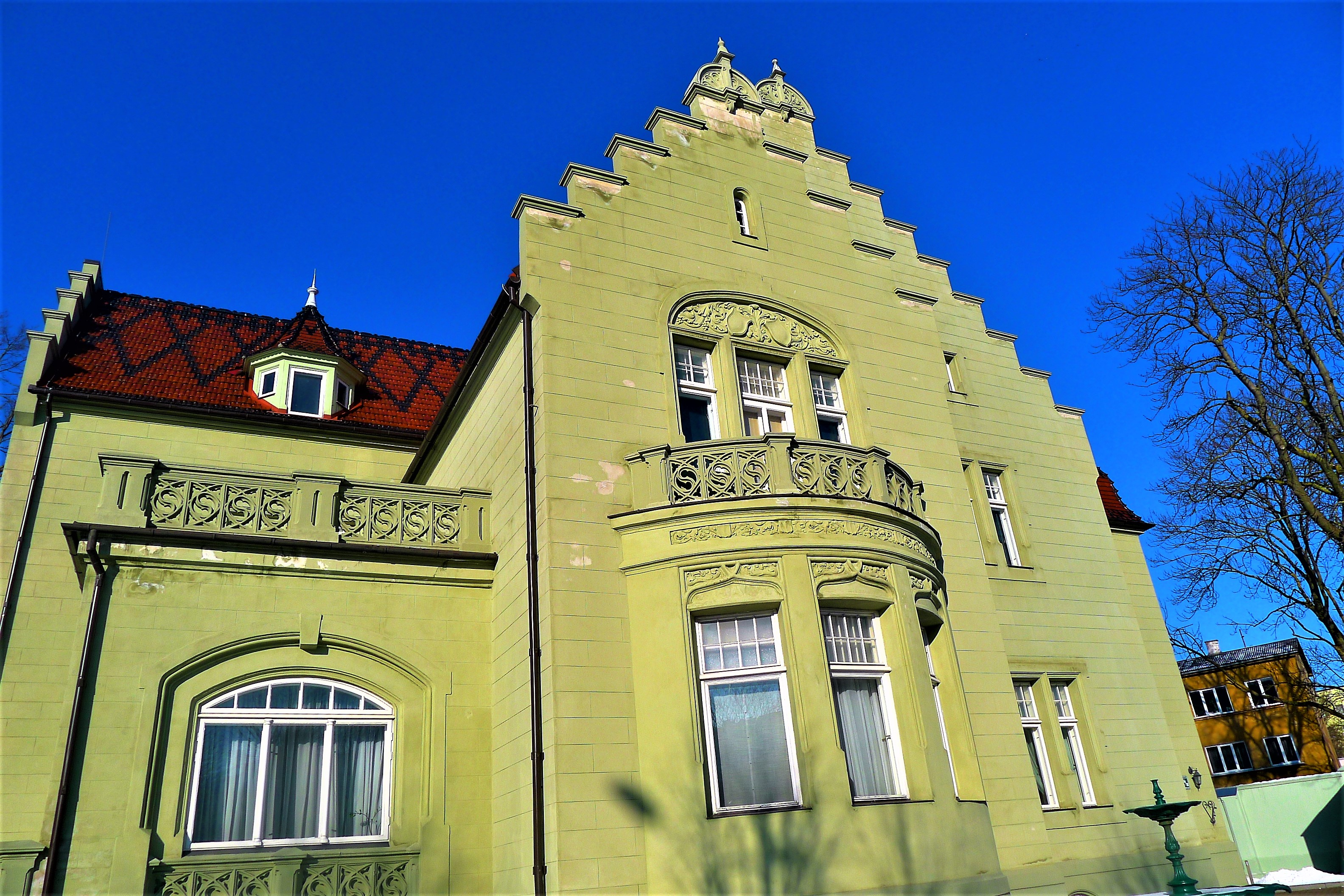
- Liepāja Museum in 2018

- Location within Latvia
- Location: Kūrmājas prospekts, Vecliepāja, Liepāja, Latvia
- Coordinates: 56°30′39″N 21°00′07″E
- Website: www.liepajasmuzejs.lv

Liepāja Museum (Latvian: Liepājas muzejs) is a museum in Liepāja, Latvia. It is the largest museum in the historical region of Courland. It possesses more than 100,000 articles, but in the halls of the museum, there are 1,500 exhibits. Permanent displays tell of Liepāja's history, starting from its early days and of the ethnography of South Kurzeme. They feature a special collection of tinware and an exhibition telling about the life and works of the woodcarver Miķelis Pankoks. The Museum also regularly hosts various local, national and international art exhibitions. The museum also houses the archive of the former city architect of Liepāja, Paul Max Bertschy.
