= Jonas Černius =

Lithuanian politician

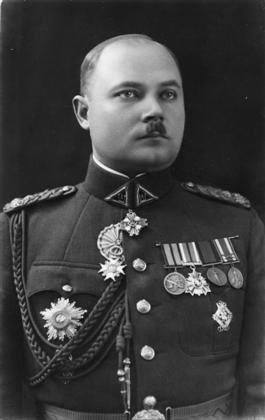

15th Prime Minister of Lithuania
- In office 28 March 1939 – 21 November 1939
- President: Antanas Smetona
- Preceded by: Vladas Mironas
- Succeeded by: Antanas Merkys

Personal details
- Born: 18 January 1898 Kupiškis, Kovno Governorate, Russian Empire
- Died: 3 July 1977 (aged 79) Los Angeles, United States
- Party: Lithuanian Nationalist Union

Jonas Černius (6 January 1898, Kupiškis, Kovno Governorate – 3 July 1977, Los Angeles) was a Lithuanian general and Prime Minister. When Lithuania declared independence in 1918, he joined the army as a volunteer and participated in the Freedom Wars. He was one of the first graduates from the War School of Kaunas, but he continued to study military engineering in Brussels (1929) and Paris (1932).

On his return to Lithuania, he was promoted to lieutenant colonel and appointed as chief of the military technical staff. In 1934, he became a colonel. In 1935, he was promoted to brigadier general and Chief of the General Staff. From 27 March to 21 November 1939, he was the Prime Minister and led the 20th cabinet. After resigning as prime minister, he was promoted to major general and put in command of the 1st Division. Following the annexation of Lithuania by the Soviet Union, he served in the Soviet Army's 24th Rifle Corps until Nazi Germany invaded in 1941.

External videos
- Kentish Farm Aka Ex-Premier Of Lithuania On Farm (1947)

He fled to Germany in 1944 to avoid the second Soviet occupation. At first, he lived in Germany, then in Kent, England, where he worked as a farm worker and in 1948, he moved to the U.S. He later worked as an engineer for General Motors.

Preceded by Vladas Mironas	Prime Minister of Lithuania; 30 March 1939 – 22 November 1939	Succeeded by Antanas Merkys
