= Paul Max Bertschy =

Baltic German architect active in Latvia

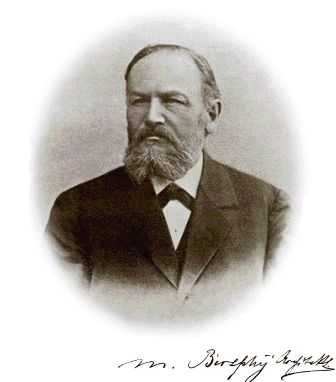
- Born: 1 January 1840; Strausberg, Kingdom of Prussia (Now Germany)
- Died: 1 February 1911 (aged 81); Liepāja, Courland Governorate, Russian Empire (Now Latvia)
- Known for: Architecture
- Movement: Historicism

Paul Max Bertschy (Latvian: Pauls Makss Berči; 1 January 1840 – 1 February 1911) was a Baltic German architect, working mainly in what is now Latvia. He was the city architect of Liepāja for more than 30 years and designed numerous public and private buildings for the city, around 70 of which are extant.

== Biography ==
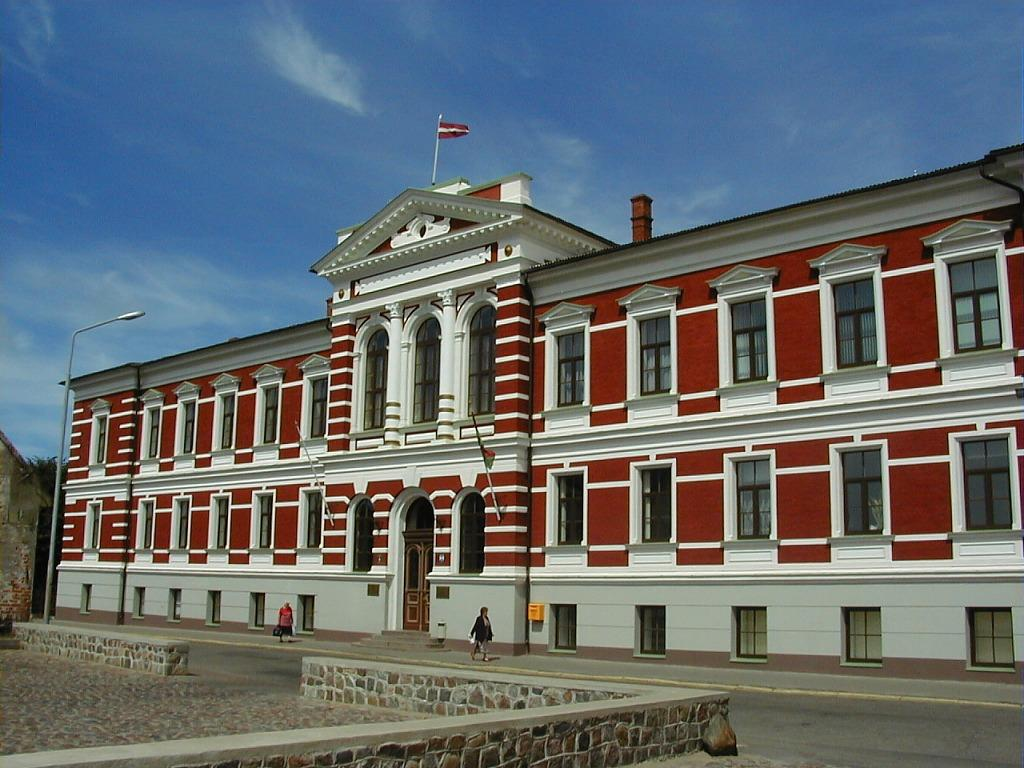
Former district court, today Liepāja City Council, by Bertschy

Paul Max Bertschy was born in Strausberg in Germany, in a family of carpenters. He was one of nine children. He studied in Berlin and also abroad. He left Berlin due to its fierce competition and sought a career as an architect in what are now the Baltic states. The first years of his career he worked for several different architectural firms. From 1860 to 1864, he was in Riga working in the firm of Heinrich Scheel. He then moved to Daugavpils, where he was engaged in the construction of a railway line between Daugavpils and Vitebsk. At the same time he accepted separate commissions and took on Wilhelm Neumann as his pupil.

In 1871 he was invited to become the city architect of Liepāja by the mayor of the city, and would keep the position until 1902. At the time, the city experienced rapid growth due to industrialization and trade, and through his many commissions Bertschy contributed significantly to the architecture of the city. He worked mainly in medievalist styles such as Neo-Gothic and Neo-Romanesque. Red brick, or a mix of red brick and other materials, was often favoured by Bertschy. His range was broad, and he designed private residences as well as religious and public buildings. Despite many of these buildings having been destroyed during World War II, more than 70 buildings designed by Bertschy are extant in Liepāja. This includes the former spa hospital (1871–1875), the Liepāja Gymnasium building (today owned by University of Liepāja) (1883–1884), the Lutheran Church of Saint Anne (1892–1893), the former district court building (now City Council), and numerous residential buildings.

Bertschy died in Liepāja in 1911. His archive is in Liepāja Museum. Many of the buildings which he designed are now marked with plaques bearing his name.
