= Christian Democratic Party of Russia =

Political party in Russia

Christian Democratic Party of Russia Российская Христианско-Демократическая партия
- Abbreviation: RCD, РХД
- President: 1917: Edward Ropp; 1990-2002: Alexander Chuev
- Founder: 1917: Edward Ropp; 1990-2002: Alexander Chuev
- Founded: 1917 (Russian Republic); 1990 (Russian Federation)
- Ideology: 1917: Political Catholicism; Baltic German interests Polish interests Anti-communism; 1990-2002: Christian democracy Eastern Orthodox politics Pro-Europeanism
- Political position: Centre
- Religion: 1917: Catholicism; 1990-2002: Russian Orthodoxy
- Colors: Purple
- State Duma: 0 / 450

Website
- http://www.aha.ru/~rcdp/

The Christian Democratic Party of Russia (RCD; Russian: Российская Христианско-Демократическая партия) was a Christian democratic political party in the Russian Federation. It was founded in May 1990, but represents a revival of a previous political party founded by the clergy of the Catholic Church in Russia following the February Revolution.

In 1917, Archbishop Eduard von der Ropp had decreed that all his priests would take a role in organizing a Christian Democratic Party to participate in the planned Russian Constituent Assembly and defend the rights of Russian Catholics. In this, the Archbishop was sharply opposed by both Auxiliary Bishop Jan Cieplak and Monsignor Konstanty Budkiewicz, who both opposed any politicization of the Catholic religion. The party went dormant following the October Revolution and the arrest and deportation of the Archbishop in 1919 during the Red Terror.

After the party's revival in 1990, it maintained fraternal relations with Christian Democratic parties in Europe and around the world.

Party leader Alexander Chuev was on the Unity ticket in the legislative elections in 1999 and the United Russia ticket in 2007 and was elected to the State Duma.

In 2002 the party planned to file a complaint in a Moscow court against the law on political parties which banned the creation of religious parties, following the Justice Ministry's refusal to register the party.
