= Salomėja Stakauskaitė =

Lithuanian educator and politician

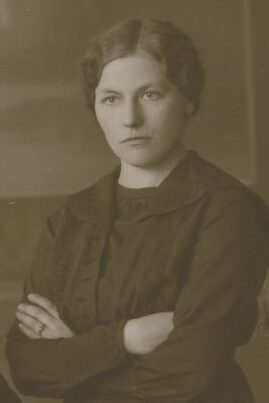

Member of the Constituent Assembly
- In office 1920–1922
- Constituency: Raseiniai

Personal details
- Born: 20 May 1890 Užliaušiai, Russian Empire
- Died: 26 September 1971 (aged 81) Panevėžys, Soviet Union

Salomėja Stakauskaitė (20 May 1890 – 26 September 1971) was a Lithuanian educator and politician. In 1920 she was one of five women elected to the Constituent Assembly, Lithuania's first female parliamentarians. She remained a member of parliament until 1922.

== Biography ==
Stakauskaitė was born in Užliaušiai in 1890. She attended Liepāja Gymnasium from 1902 until 1909, after which she lived with her brother Juozas, a pastor in Panevėžys and did pedagogical work. After the establishment of Saulė seminary in Panevėžys, she became a teacher in the institution. She spent two years studying in Warsaw, attending lectures in pedagogy and natural sciences. She returned to Panevėžys during World War I and organised courses for teachers. Between 1918 and 1920 she lived in Jurbarkas, where she worked in the new gymnasium established by the Saulė Society.

A member of the Lithuanian Christian Democratic Party, in 1920 she was elected to the Constituent Assembly from constituency III, Raseiniai. She was not re-elected in 1922, after which she returned to teaching, working in Krekenava and Šėta. After World War II she became a teacher and head librarian at the Secondary School No. 1 in Panevėžys. She died in 1971.
