= Juozas Matulis =

Lithuanian scientist (1899–1993)

- Born: 19 March 1899; Tatkonis, Vilnius Governorate, Russian Empire
- Died: 25 June 1993 (aged 94); Vilnius, Lithuania
- Education: University of Lithuania; Leipzig University
- Scientific career
- Fields: Physical chemistry
- Workplaces: Lithuanian Academy of Sciences

Juozas Matulis (19 March 1899 – 25 June 1993) was a Lithuanian chemist, physicist and long-time president of the Lithuanian Academy of Sciences.

== Education ==
In 1912, Matulis graduated from Juodpėnai Elementary School. He then studied at the Liepoja Gymnasium from 1920 he served in the electrical engineering battalion of the Lithuanian army. in 1923 Assistant Head of the Organization Department of the Post, Telegraph and Telephone Board.

In 1924, he graduated from the Adult Gymnasium of the Lithuanian Teachers' Trade Union in Kaunas and entered the Technical Faculty of the University of Lithuania. In 1925, he was transferred to the Physics and Chemistry Department of the Faculty of Mathematics and Natural Sciences. From 1925, Mautlis participated in the activities of the Lithuanian Social Democratic Party and was a member of its student organization Žiežirba.

In 1928, he was accepted to the University of Lithuania as a junior laboratory assistant and in 1929 he graduated from the university. From 1930 he was chief assistant of the Chemistry Department of Kaunas University. In 1931–1933, he completed an internship at the University of Leipzig and in 1934 he received a doctorate in chemistry.

== Academic career ==
From 1936, he was associate professor and from 1940 the Dean of the Faculty of Mathematical Sciences and Natural Sciences of Vilnius University. Matulis career reached new heights after the Soviet occupation of Lithuania in 1940. In 1941, he was elected as an academician of the Academy of Sciences of the Lithuanian SSR and secretary of the Department of Natural Sciences. After the war, Matulis became the chairman of the restoration committee of the Lithuanian Academy of Sciences and in 1946, he was elected chairman of the Academy of Sciences, a position he held until 1984. He was also a Corresponding Member of the Academy of Sciences of the Soviet Union. Matulis was the founder of the national electrochemical school in Lithuania.

As politician he was a deputy of the Supreme Soviet of the Lithuanian SSR from 1947, and from 1959 to 1963 he was its deputy chairman. Matulis became a member of the Communist Party of Lithuania in 1950 and was a member of its Central Committee from 1956 to 1986.
