= Liepāja Gymnasium =

Latvian secondary school open 1865-1915

Coordinates: 56°30′31″N 21°00′25″E

Liepāja Nicolai Gymnasium was a six-year (later seven) gymnasium (high school) in Liepāja (Libau), Courland Governorate, Russian Empire.

It was established in 1865 on the basis of a school that traced its roots to 1848. The school was named in honor of Nicholas Alexandrovich, Tsesarevich of Russia. The school building was constructed in 1883–1885 by architect Paul Max Bertschy. The school was diverse in students' religious and ethnic background. For example, in 1884, out of 398 pupils, 161 were Evangelical Lutherans (41.2%), 130 Jews (33.3%), 76 Catholics (19.4%) and 22 Eastern Orthodoxs (5.6%). The curriculum devoted substantial attention to the Latin and Greek languages. The language of instruction was switched from German to Russian in 1887.

The school continued to function until its evacuation to Petrograd during World War I (1915).

== Principals ==
School principals were:

- Karl Lessevs (Carl Lessew, 1865–1869)
- Nikolai Lenstrēms (Nicolai Lenström, 1870–1883)
- Albert Volgemuts (Albert Wohlgemuth, 1883–1905)
- Nicolai Papilov (1905–1908)

== Prominent students ==
Many prominent Latvian, Lithuanian, Polish, and German people studied at the gymnasium, including:

- Leonas Bistras, Prime Minister of Lithuania
- Balys Dvarionas, Lithuanian composer
- Oswald Külpe, German psychologist
- Juozas Matulis, Lithuanian chemist and physicist
- Gabriel Narutowicz, President of Poland
- Stanisław Narutowicz, Signatory of the Act of Independence of Lithuania
- Issai Schur, Jewish mathematician
- Salomėja Stakauskaitė, one of the first group of women parliamentarians in Lithuania
- Konstanty Skirmunt, Polish diplomat and Minister of Foreign Affairs
- Aleksandras Stulginskis, President of Lithuania
- Juozas Tūbelis, Prime Minister of Lithuania
- Antanas Vienuolis, Lithuanian writer
- Max Weinreich, Jewish linguist
