= Church of the Holy Cross, Kaunas =

Catholic church in Kaunas, Lithuania

Holy Cross Church Šv. Kryžiaus (Karmelitų) bažnyčia
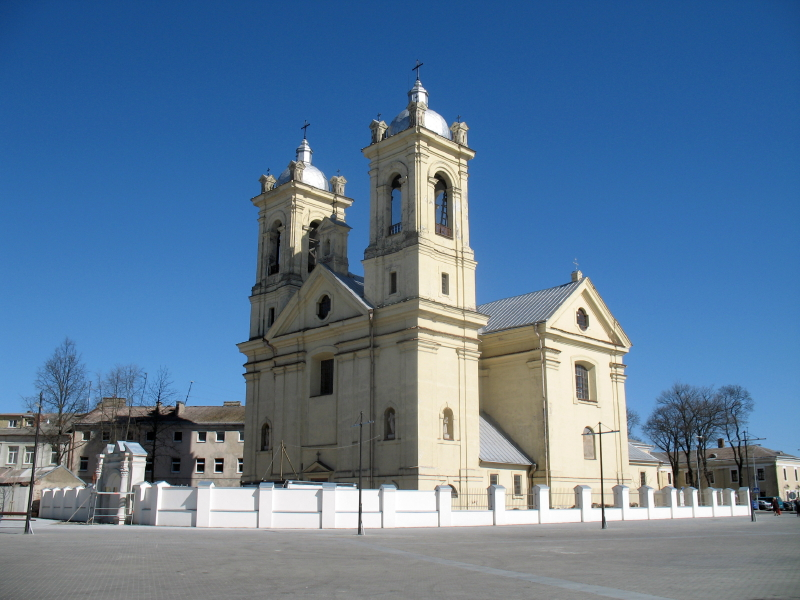
- The Holy Cross Church of Kaunas

Religion
- Affiliation: Roman Catholic
- Diocese: Centras (Kaunas)
- Year consecrated: 1720

Location
- Location: Kaunas, Lithuania
- Interactive map of Holy Cross Church; Šv. Kryžiaus (Karmelitų) bažnyčia
- Coordinates: 54°53′23.34″N 23°55′12.92″E

Architecture
- Type: Church
- Style: Late Baroque
- Completed: 1700

Specifications
- Direction of façade: West
- Materials: brick

Holy Cross Church, Kaunas (Lithuanian: Šv. Kryžiaus (Karmelitų) bažnyčia) is located in the Centre elderate of Kaunas, Lithuania.

== Overview ==
The monks of the Order of Carmelites bought several plots of land for the monastery in Kaunas near the Nemunas river in 1706. Some years earlier, the new church was sanctified nearby in 1685. It was consecrated in 1700. The church was built in the late baroque style. It is a two tower building of Latin cross shape. The painting in the main dome represents the prophet Elijah. It was created in the second half of the 18th century. After the spread of cholera epidemic, Tsarist Russian government established the hospital on the first floor of the monastery in 1831. The church and the monastery were closed in 1845 and since when were used as a store house for carts and harness. At the same time the interior of the church was vandalized.

The St. Cross Church of Kaunas was returned to the believers only in 1881. During the renovation from 1885 till 1898, five new sanctuaries were built, the pulpit, the organ, as well as three new bells were installed. Tyrolean artist John Kerle decorated the vaults of the church with the seventeen compositions in 1898. The church was renovated once more in 1925–1934. The Holy Cross Church of Kaunas was included into the Registry of Immovable Cultural Heritage Sites of the Republic of Lithuania in 1996.
