= Constitutional Catholic Party of Lithuania and Belarus =

Political party in the Russian Empire

Constitutional Catholic Party of Lithuania and Bel Stronnictwo Konstytucyjno-Katolickie na Litwę i Białoruś (Polish) Канстытуцыйна-каталіцкая партыя Літвы і Беларусі (Belarusian)
- Edward Ropp
- Founded: 1906
- Ideology: Conservatism; Krajowcy

The Constitutional Catholic Party of Lithuania and Belarus (Polish: Stronnictwo Konstytucyjno-Katolickie na Litwę i Białoruś; Belarusian: Канстытуцыйна-каталіцкая партыя Літвы і Беларусі) was a political party in the Russian Empire, founded by the Bishop of Vilnius Edward Ropp on 7 February 1906. It sought the unification of the lands of the former Grand Duchy of Lithuania with the aim of regional self-government. It worked for the establishment of a Polish government and the formation of Polish armed forces. The party demanded the exemption of Catholics from the compulsory tithe of the Russian Orthodox Church, autonomy for the Catholic Church in matters of clerical education without state interference, and the right of Catholic bishops to have direct communications with the Holy See. Ropp was elected to the State Duma of the Russian Empire.

The organizational congress, held in February 1906 in Vilnius, was attended by approximately 1,000 party supporters, representatives of the Catholic clergy, landowners, intellectuals, workers, and peasants. The party combined the liberalism of the Constitutional Democratic Party in political life, conservatism in its approaches to the socio-economic problems of Belarus and Lithuania, and the ideals of Christian democracy.

The party collaborated with the Polish National-Democratic Party. It conducted educational courses for priests and published the newspapers Nowiny Wileńskie (Vilnius News, January-February 1906), Towarzysz pracy (Friend of Labor, February-March 1906), and Przyjaciel ludu (Friend of the People, from January 1906). The party linked the resolution of agrarian and other issues with the establishment of local self-government. It defended landowners' rights and advocated for assistance to peasants in acquiring land.

It operated mainly in the Vilna Governorate and some districts of the Grodno Governorate, where the majority of the population was Catholic.

In the elections to the First State Duma, the party merged with the Constitutional Democratic Party (the "Kadets") and achieved significant success: the party received support from six of seven deputies from the Vilnius Governorate supported the party and eleven deputies (autonomists) from other governorates of the Western Krai. In the Second State Duma of the Russian Empire, eleven autonomists supported the party's ideas.

The party disbanded in the autumn of 1907.
