= Edward Ropp =

Baltic German Catholic archbishop

His Excellency Edward Ropp
- Archbishop of Mohilev
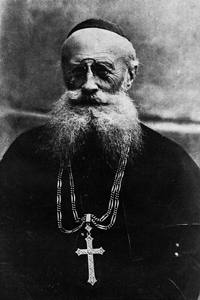
- Church: Roman Catholic
- Archdiocese: Mohilev
- Appointed: 25 July 1917
- In office: 1917-1939
- Predecessor: Wincenty Kluczyński
- Successor: Boļeslavs Sloskāns
- Previous posts: Bishop of Tiraspol (1902–1903); Bishop of Vilnius (1903–1917)

Orders
- Ordination: 2 August 1886
- Consecration: 16 November 1902 by Bolesław Hieronim Kłopotowski
- Rank: Metropolitan Archbishop

Personal details
- Born: December 15, 1851 Līksna, Dvinsky Uyezd, Vitebsk Governorate, Russian Empire
- Died: July 25, 1939 (aged 87) Poznań, Poland
- Buried: Poznań Cathedral

Edward Ropp (German: Eduard Michael Johann Maria Baron von der Ropp; 1851–1939) was a Polish nobleman of Baltic German origins, Bishop of Vilnius and Roman Catholic metropolitan archbishop of Mogilev. He was born 2 December 1851 near Līksna in present-day Latvia and died on 25 July 1939 in Poznań, Poland.

== Early life ==
Edward Ropp was the third of four sons of Julian Emeryk Ropp, a Polish noble, descendant of the Baltic German nobility. His father was a direct descendant of Theodoricus de Raupena, the eldest brother of Bishop Albert who founded the city of Riga in 1201. His mother, Izabela Józefa Plater-Zyberk, daughter of civil vice-governor of Vilnius Michał Plater-Zyberk, was from a family which owned estates at both Lixna (Līksna) in Latgale (then Vitebsk Governorate) and Bewern (Bebrene) in Sēlija (then Courland Governorate).

Edward Ropp was born in Līksna on December 2, 1851. He received his university education in Saint Petersburg and graduated in 1875. After graduation he remained in Saint Petersburg working for the Russian government. In 1879, he decided to enter the Roman Catholic seminary in Kaunas. He then went on to study theology in Innsbruck, Austria, and Fribourg, Switzerland. Upon his return in 1886, he was ordained a priest in Kaunas.

After ordination, Fr. Ropp was sent to Liepāja in Courland where he worked as a parish priest in years 1889-1902. There he began enlargement of a small church building into what is now the Cathedral of St. Joseph. In 1893 he was given additional responsibility as the vicar of all parishes in Courland.

== Episcopal ministry ==
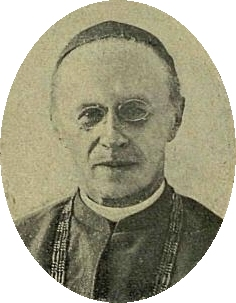
Bishop Edward Ropp in 1906

Ropp was appointed bishop of Tiraspol, with the see in Saratov, on 9 June 1902 by Pope Leo XIII. It was a huge diocese encompassing all of Southern Russia and Caucasus.

Only a year later on 9 November 1903 he was appointed bishop of Vilnius by Pope Pius X. On 2 December 1903, Ropp was installed in Vilnius Cathedral. He traveled back to Saratov in 1904 to co-consecrate his successor as bishop of Tiraspol Josef Alois Kessler on 10 November.

The Diocese of Vilnius was the largest Catholic diocese in the Russian Empire in terms of the number of believers and parishes. It was also subject to the greatest repression because of this. Bishops were usually subject to exile, and the diocese was ruled by administrators. In early 1902, Bishop Stefan Aleksander Zwierowicz was exiled to Tver for issuing a ban on Catholics sending their children to Orthodox schools. In 1903, he agreed to take over the Sandomierz diocese, and in his place Edward Ropp was appointed Bishop of Vilnius.

On April 17, 1905, Tsar Nicholas II issued a tolerance decree allowing members of the dissolved Uniate Church to return from Orthodoxy to Roman Catholicism. Bishop Ropp issued directives facilitating conversion, including conducting religious instruction in the language of the faithful. By the end of 1908, according to official Russian data, 30,318 people in the Vilnius diocese had converted.

In January 1906, the bishop founded the daily newspaper Nowiny Wileńskie. However, he soon purchased Kurier Litewski from Feliks Zawadzki, merged the editorial staff of his newspaper into it, and continued publishing under that title. Additionally, the Catholic weekly Przyjaciel began to appear in Vilnius. The press activities aimed to promote the program of the Constitutional Catholic Party of Lithuania and Belarus, founded by the bishop, which sought to fight for the social and religious rights of Catholics of all nationalities and to prevent ethnic conflicts among them. The party's program included land reform, the fight for workers' rights, the right to strike, freedom of speech and religion, and judicial independence. The progressive nature of the program led to the party's closure after just eight months, on October 6, 1906.

The bishop carried out active pastoral work, visiting parishes with the charismatic Fr. Jan Kurczewski, consecrating churches, and delivering sermons in both Polish and Lithuanian. His goal was to ease Polish-Lithuanian tensions related to the struggle over the auxiliary language of worship in mixed parishes.

His activities faced hostility from Russian authorities, who had been planning to remove him from Vilnius since 1906. These plans were temporarily halted by his election to the State Duma. However, on October 7, 1907, he was sentenced to exile from the diocese. The official reasons cited were his political activities, disregard for Russification policies, and "narrowly nationalistic efforts aimed at Polonizing Lithuanians and Belarusians." Unofficially, his exile was also intended to prevent a pogrom against Jews in Vilnius, which had been organized by the Okhrana.

The bishop was banned from entering the diocese and from communicating with the faithful and clergy. Initially, he went to St. Petersburg, where he spent several weeks at St. Catherine’s Church. He then moved to his brother’s estate in Niszcza, in the Vitebsk Governorate. In 1908, Kazimierz Mikołaj Michalkiewicz was appointed as the administrator of the diocese.

On 25 July 1917, he was appointed metropolitan archbishop of Mohilev by Pope Benedict XV. He returned to Saint Petersburg to take up this post, and, following the February Revolution, Archbishop Ropp, decreed that all his priests would take a role in organizing a Christian Democratic Party to participate in the planned Russian Constituent Assembly in order to defend the rights of the Catholic Church in Russia. In this, the Archbishop was sharply opposed by both Auxiliary Bishop Jan Cieplak and Monsignor Konstanty Budkiewicz, who both opposed any politicization of the Catholic religion.

After the October Revolution, Archbishop Ropp came into conflict with the new Soviet Union. In 1919, he was arrested during the Red Terror by the CHEKA and received a death sentence for anti-Soviet agitation, but was instead deported to the Second Polish Republic in 1920 on the intercession of the Holy See. Pope Pius XI appointed him an assistant at the Pontifical Throne on 28 May 1927.

Unable to return to Russia, he lived in Poland until his death in 1939. He settled in Warsaw at 24 Piękna Street, where he organized the secretariat of the Archdiocese of Mogilev and an ecclesiastical court. In 1922, he founded the Missionary Society, and in 1924, the Missionary Institute in Lublin, both aimed at training missionaries for work in the East.

He traveled to Latvia in 1924 to attend the ingress of Archbishop Antonijs Springovičs at the Cathedral of St. James in Riga on 4 May and to co-consecrate the new auxiliary bishop of Riga Jāzeps Rancāns the same day.

He spent the last months of his life with his nephew, Stefan Ropp, the director of the Poznań Trade Fair. He died in Poznań on July 25, 1939, and was buried in the Archcathedral Basilica of St. Peter and St. Paul, Poznań. On March 21, 1983, his coffin was transferred to the pro-cathedral in Białystok, which at the time served as the seat of the apostolic administration for the Polish part of the Archdiocese of Vilnius.

== Bibliography ==
- (in German) "Ropp", Neue Deutsche Biographie, Duncker & Humblot GmbH, Berlin (2005), vol. 22, pp. 33–35, ISBN 3-428-11291-1
- (in German) "Rosen", Neue Deutsche Biographie, Duncker & Humblot GmbH, Berlin (2005), vol. 22, pp. 49–50, ISBN 3-428-11291-1
- Krachel, Tadeusz (2014). "Biskup Edward Ropp jako rządca diecezji wileńskiej" [Bishop Edward Ropp as an administrator of the Vilnius diocese]. Diecezja wileńska. Studia i szkice (in Polish). Białystok.
