= Society of Saint Zita =

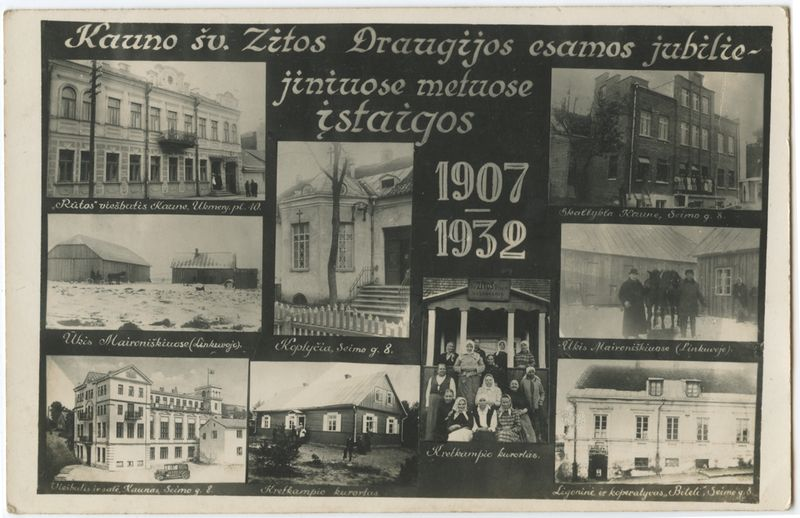
Postcard for the 25th anniversary of the society showcasing its institutions in and around Kaunas

The Society of Saint Zita (Lithuanian: Lietuvių katalikių tarnaičių šv. Zitos draugija) was a Lithuanian Catholic professional society of female servants and other workers active from 1905 to 1940. It was one of the first organizations of Lithuanian women. Its members were known as zitietės.

== History ==
=== In Vilnius ===
Restrictions of organizing various societies and organizations were relaxed after the Russian Revolution of 1905. In 1905, philanthropist Józef Montwiłł began organizing female servants and workers, both Polish and Lithuanian, into a society in Vilnius. Its Lithuanian members separated in 1906 and obtained premises (three rooms) at the former Franciscan monastery by the Church of the Assumption of the Blessed Virgin Mary in October 1906. Under the name of the Community of St. Nicholas (Šv. Mikalojaus bendrija), they became an autonomous section of the Lithuanian Mutual Assistance Society of Vilnius. The community was officially registered on 6 December 1906. Its founders included priest Antanas Viskantas and Emilija Vileišienė. From 1911 until its dissolution, the society was headed by Pranas Bieliauskas, vicar at Vilnius Cathedral. In 1913, the society separated from the Mutual Assistance Society and became an independent Society of Saint Zita. It had about 800 members. During World War I, the society established a sash making workshop which employed up to 34 women and a soup kitchen which provided free meals to 50–70 people per day.

=== In Kaunas ===
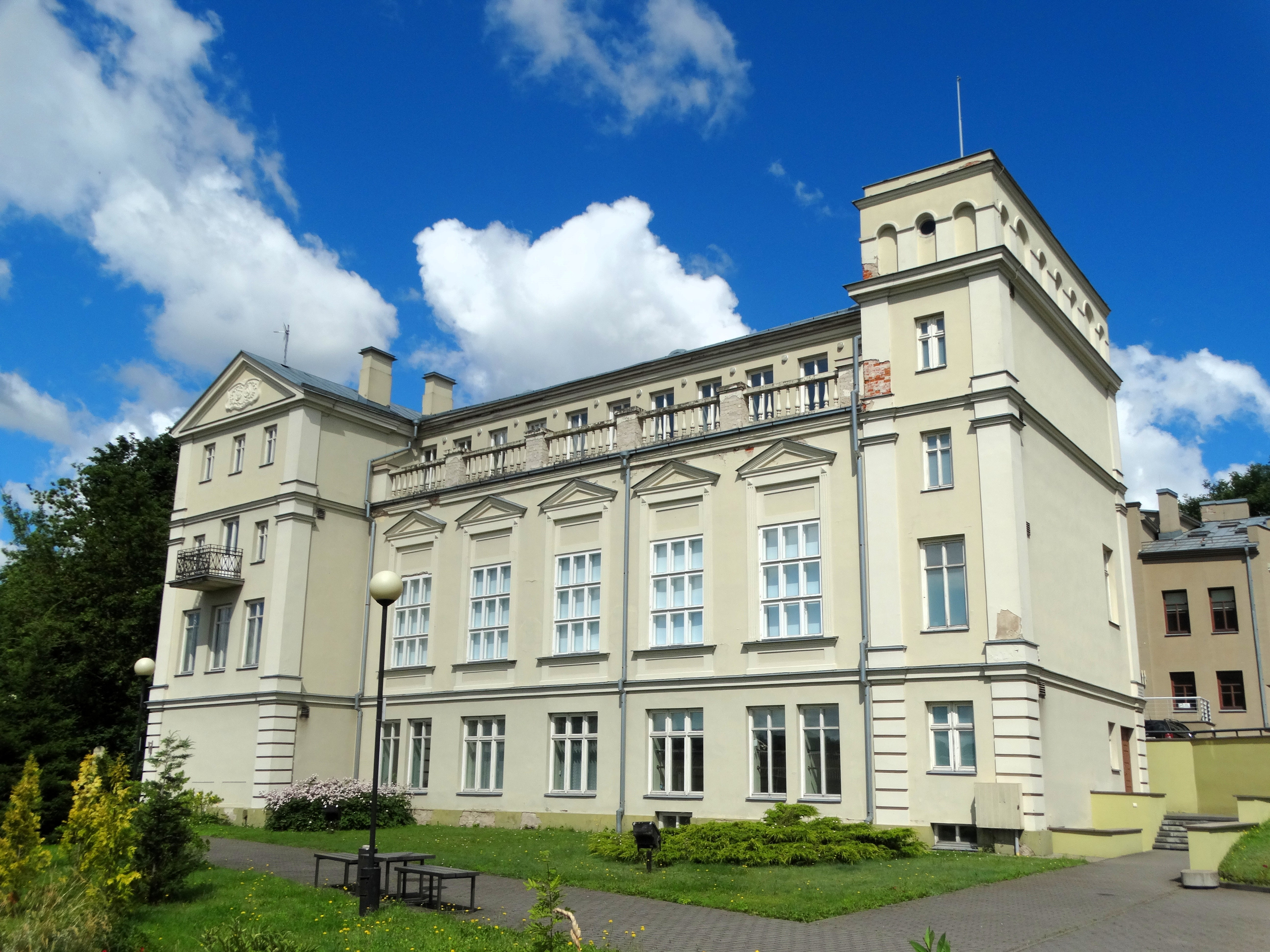
Former headquarters of the Society of Saint Zita in Kaunas (completed in 1925)

The Society of Saint Zita in Kaunas was organized separately by priests Povilas Dogelis and Juozapas Jarašiūnas (government permissions for societies were given separately in each governorate). It was officially registered on 3 July 1907, and Jarašiūnas was elected its chairman. It had 315 members in 1907 and about 600 members in 1912. Other sections were organized in Panevėžys, Šiauliai, Ukmergė, Raseiniai, Zarasai as well as in Riga (1910) and Saint Petersburg (1914). The section in Panevėžys was closed by Russian authorities in 1912. After Lithuania regained Independence in 1918, the society spread more widely across Lithuania; e.g. section in Telšiai was established in 1919. The society constructed its four-storey headquarters (architect Feliksas Vizbaras) in 1925 at a cost of 400,000 litas (present-day Theological Faculty of Vytautas Magnus University). The society was closed on 10 September 1940 by the Council of People's Commissars of the Lithuanian SSR.

== Activities ==
The society promoted Lithuanian culture, supported Catholic faith, and protected women's virtues. The society organized educational courses, local reading rooms, social evenings with music and theater performances, operated laundries, spinning mills, and other small businesses for women, provided temporary shelter and financial assistance to struggling members, maintained shelters for the elderly. During World War I, its members nursed injured soldiers and cared for the prisoners of war. Some members, after receiving the basic education from the society, became primary school or catechism teachers in villages. While the society united household workers, it was not a union as it did not intervene in conflicts between employees and employers. The society, often organized and led by priests, was very conservative and did not show greater interest in the wider women's movement.
