= Chodakowski =

Chodakowski is a Polish surname. Its Lithuanian-language equivalent is Chodakauskas, Russian and Ukrainian: Khodakovsky. Notable people with the surname include:

- Zorian Dołęga-Chodakowski (1784–1825), Polish ethnographer and archaeologist
- Romanas Chodakauskas (1883–1932), Lithuanian military attaché to Berlin and Colonel in the Lithuanian Military Court
- Sofija Smetonienė (née Chodakauskaitė) (1885–1968), the wife of the first President of Lithuania Antanas Smetona and First Lady of Lithuania
- Tadas Chodakauskas (1889–1959), the long-standing mayor of Panevėžys, Lithuania (1925–1940).
- Jadvyga Tūbelienė (née Chodakauskaitė) (1891–1988), one of the founders of the Lithuanian Women's Council, a writer, journalist, head of the Information Bureau in Bern and Paris, Deputy Chief of Mission to Switzerland and married to Juozas Tūbelis, the longest-standing Prime Minister of Lithuania
- Kazimierz Chodakowski (1929–2017), Polish ice hockey defenceman and Olympian
- Ludwik Mieczysław Chodakowski (1843–1914), Polish–Lithuanian surgeon, doctor of medicine
- Miron Chodakowski (1957–2010), Polish religious figure
- Alexander Khodakovsky (born 1972), Russian separatist paramilitary commander.

== See also ==
- Chodakowski Family
