= Jonas Jablonskis =

Lithuanian linguist (1860–1930)

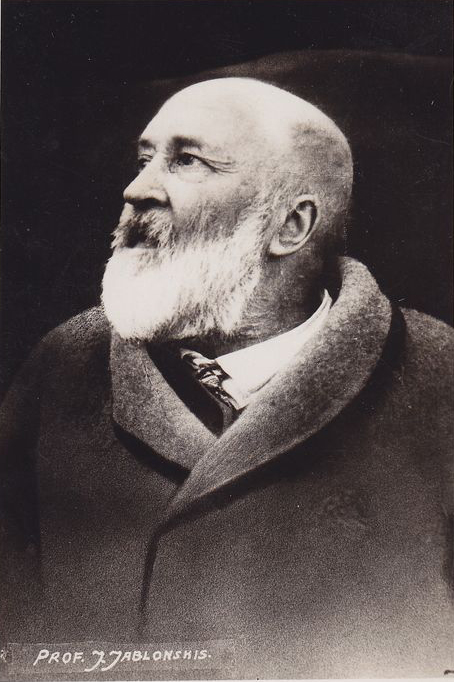
- Born: December 30, 1860; Kubilėliai, Congress Poland
- Died: February 23, 1930 (aged 69); Kaunas, Lithuania
- Education: Imperial Moscow University
- Occupation: linguist
- Known for: one of the founders of the standard Lithuanian language

Jonas Jablonskis (Lithuanian pronunciation: [joːnɐs jɐbˈɫɔnskɪs]; 30 December 1860, in Kubilėliai, Šakiai district – 23 February 1930, in Kaunas) was a distinguished Lithuanian linguist and one of the founders of the standard Lithuanian language. He used the pseudonym Rygiškių Jonas, taken from the small town named Rygiškiai where he spent his childhood.

== Biography ==
After graduation from Marijampolė Gymnasium, Jablonskis studied classical languages at the Imperial Moscow University from 1881 to 1885. Amongst his professors were Filipp Fortunatov and Fedor Yevgenievich Korsh, both of whom were familiar with Lithuanian and encouraged their students to research his native language. Upon completing his studies in 1885, he was confronted with the Russification policy. As a Lithuanian Catholic, he was unable to find employment in Lithuania as a teacher. He was therefore constrained for a time to give private lessons, and to serve as a clerk in the court of Marijampolė. In 1889, however, he succeeded in obtaining an appointment as a teacher of Greek and Latin at Jelgava Gymnasium, Latvia where he remained until 1896. His home became a frequent gathering place for educated Lithuanians. During summer vacations, Jablonskis collected data among native speakers in Lithuania for his linguistic studies.

Jablonskis was introduced to Antanas Chodakauskas by Chodakauskas' niece Gabrielė Petkevičaitė. The Chodakauskases and Jablonskises soon became close friends and Jablonskis often spent summers with the Chodakauskases. Jablonskis was a great promoter of the Lithuanian language and culture, and the family was soon inspired by their passion. Antanas Chodakauskas' daughter, Jadvyga once asked Jablonskis, who was visiting the Chodakauskas house, “Who am I?” Jablonskis answered, “Well, how do you feel?” Jadvyga said, “I feel Lithuanian.” “That's it!” exclaimed Jablonskis.

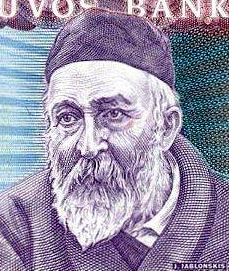
Jonas Jablonskis on the 5 litas banknote released in 1993.

Chodakauskas invited Lithuanian students, recommended by Jablonskis, to teach his children. In the summer of 1895, Jablonskis recommended a student of his, Antanas Smetona (1874-1944), to be the tutor for Romanas, Chodakauskas’ son. Romanas was studying in preparation for the entrance exams to Jelgava Gymnasium and Smetona, being from a poor, farming background, needed the work. At Gavėnoniai, the Chodakauskas manor, Antanas Smetona met his future wife, Sofija Chodakauskaitė.

Jablonskis' activities on behalf of Lithuanian causes prompted his relocation to Tallinn, Estonia, by Tsarist authorities.

The Russian Academy of Sciences charged Jablonskis with editing the dictionary compiled by the recently deceased Antanas Juška. This caused his dismissal from his teaching position in Tallinn in 1901, and banishment from Lithuania the following year. In spite of this, he continued with his work in Pskov. It was during this period that he began his Lietuviškos kalbos gramatika (Lithuanian Grammar, 1901) under the name of Petras Kriaušaitis, his first pseudonym. Since the Russian authorities prohibited the printing of Lithuanian books in the Latin alphabet, his grammar was later published in Tilsit, East Prussia.

When Jablonskis regained permission to enter Lithuania, he went to Šiauliai in 1903, and to Vilnius the next year. After the press ban was lifted in 1904, he served on the editorial boards of the newspapers Vilniaus žinios (Vilnius News) and Lietuvos ūkininkas (Lithuanian Farmer) and edited the publications of Aušra (The Dawn).

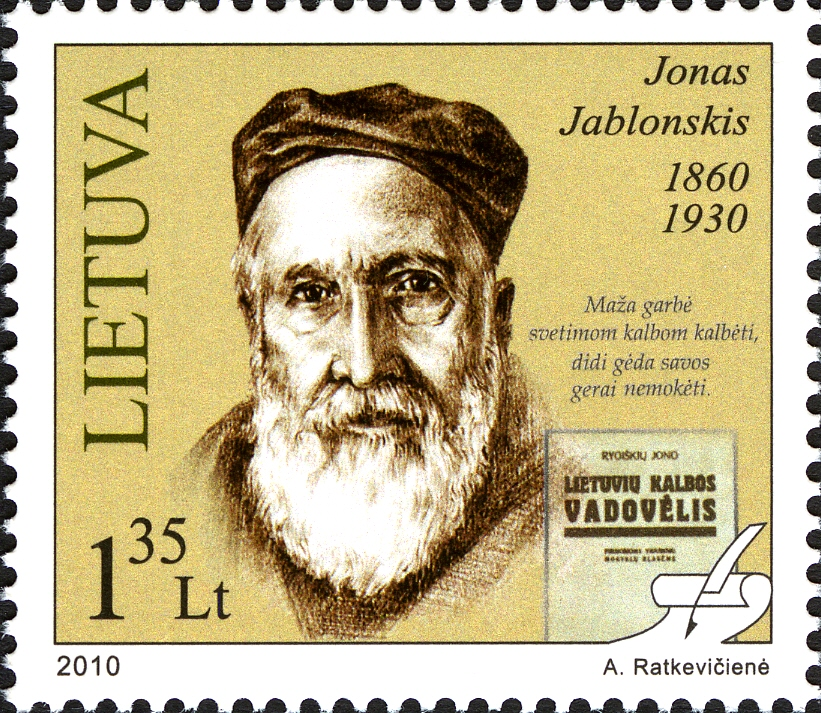
Jonas Jablonskis on a 2010 Lithuanian stamp

Between 1906 and 1908, he taught at the Pedagogic Seminary of Panevėžys. Financial hardships forced a move to Brest, Belarus in 1908, where he taught until he was transferred to Hrodna in 1912. At the beginning of World War I, the entire school was evacuated to Velizh, Russia. From 1915 to 1918, he taught at the Lithuanian refugees' gymnasium in Voronezh, from where he returned to Vilnius almost totally disabled and needing to use a wheelchair.

When Poland seized Vilnius in 1919, the Lithuanian government had him brought to Kaunas. When the University of Lithuania in Kaunas opened in 1922, he was elected honorary professor and taught Lithuanian until 1926. Concurrently, he produced texts for schools, translated and edited others' translations from foreign languages, participated in commissions set up to normalize terminology and orthography, and wrote reviews of philological literature.

He died in Kaunas on 23 February 1930. He was interred in the Petrašiūnai Cemetery.

== Works ==
Jablonskis' greatest achievement was his contribution to the formation of the standard Lithuanian language. Jablonskis, in the introduction to his Lietuviškos kalbos gramatika, was the first to formulate the essential principles that were important to later development of standard Lithuanian. His proposal was to base Lithuanian on the south western Sudovian dialect, whereas the linguists August Schleicher and Friedrich Kurschat had used the dialect of Prussian Lithuanians. Jablonskis chose a dialect, the living speech of the people, which preserved vocabulary and grammatical forms from foreign influences. In contrast, the literary language of the period suffered from heavy influx of foreign, especially Slavic, elements. Thus Jablonskis made efforts to purify the Lithuanian language.

Jablonskis' fifty years of work brought the following results: variations and inconsistencies in orthography were greatly reduced; a number of unnecessary foreign loan words were replaced by appropriate Lithuanian expressions; the formation of neologisms became subject to principles that were consistent with the rules of Lithuanian; and in general, greater order and consistency were introduced into the grammar, particularly the syntax, of written Lithuanian.

Being a practical linguist, Jonas Jablonskis wrote works designed to serve practical ends, such as Lietuvių kalbos sintaksė (Lithuanian Syntax), 1911; Rašomosios kalbos dalykai (Matters of Literary Language), 1912; Lietuvių kalbos gramatika (Lithuanian Grammar), last edition 1922; Lietuvių kalbos vadovėlis (Textbook of Lithuanian), 1925; Linksniai ir prielinksniai (Cases and Prepositions), 1929. His most significant work, however, remains Lietuvių kalbos gramatika, which for a long time was the only comprehensive manual available to schools and general public. The purification of the language was also helped by his frequent articles in periodicals, where he repeatedly pointed out unacceptable and non-Lithuanian grammatical and syntactical forms. In addition, he translated popular science and educational works by various (M. Bogdanov, Ivan Krylov, Samuel Smiles, George Sand) authors.

Many of Jablonskis' works, even though meant to serve practical needs, are still important to scientific theory. The linguistic material which he collected was published in the 20 volumes of Academic Dictionary of Lithuanian and is still being used in research and in editing of texts and books. He also introduced the letter ū into Lithuanian writing.

A complete edition of Jablonskis' works was prepared by Jonas Balčikonis and published as Jablonskio raštai, 5 volumes, Kaunas, 1932–36. Later Jonas Palionis edited a selection of his works titled Rinktiniai raštai, 2 volumes, Vilnius, 1957–1959.

== Bibliography ==
- Saulius Suziedelis, ed. (1970–1978). Encyclopedia Lituanica. Boston.
