= Lapšiai Manor =

Lithuanian manor house

Coordinates: 55°00′11″N 24°43′19″E

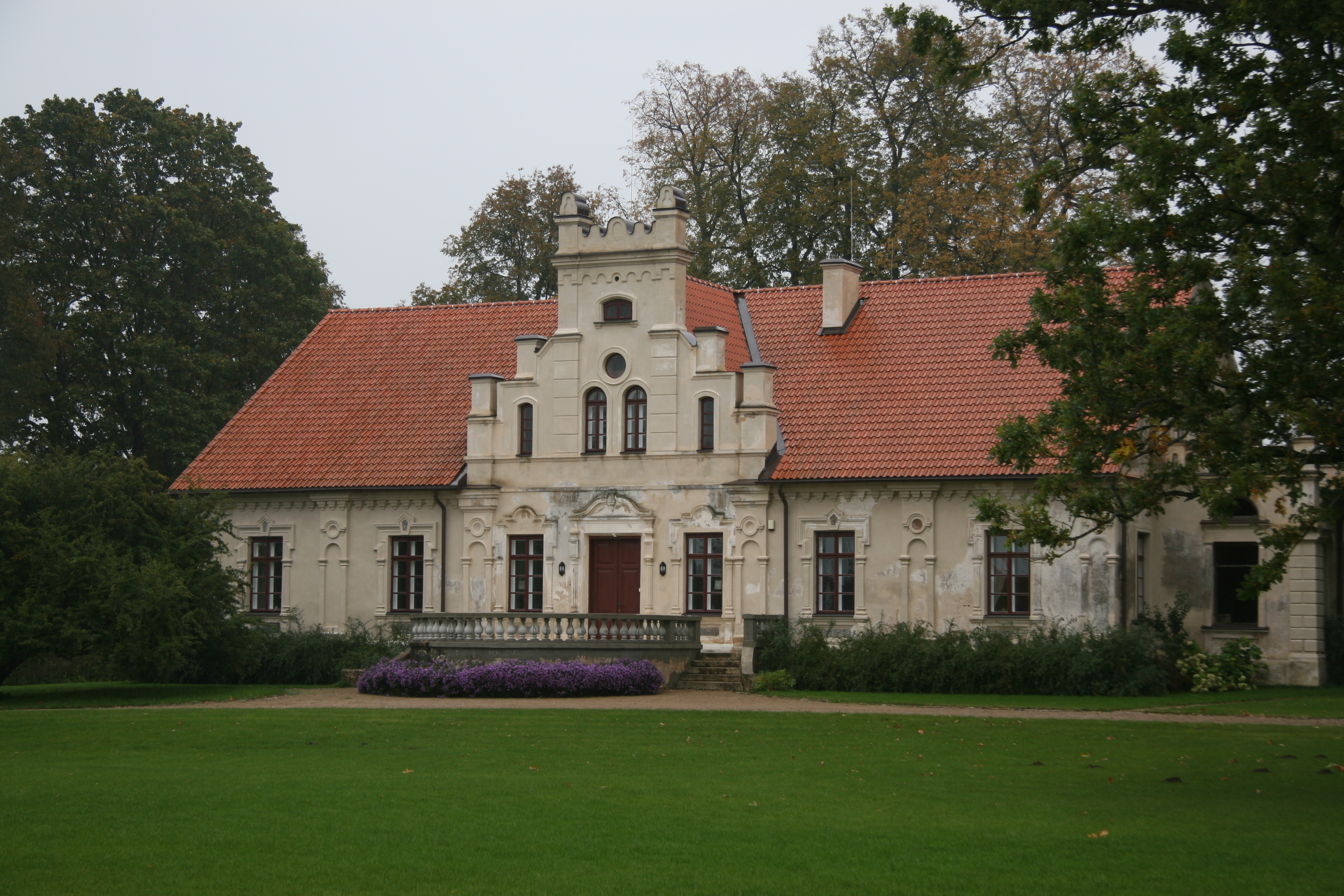
- Interactive map of the Lapšiai Manor area

General information
- Construction started: c1875

Lapšiai Manor (built c. 1875) is a residential manor house in Sirvintos District, Lithuania.

== History ==
=== 1816–1874 ===
The first reliable source of the ownership of the land comes from the 1816 Ukmerge District census. In it, 45 year-old Kaunas standard-bearer Juozas Hermanovskis and his wife, 18 year-old Anella Ulińska, are listed as the owners of the holding made up mostly of wooden buildings.

The small domain on the left bank of the Sirvintos River eventually acquired estate status.

Later in the century, the young noblemen Juozas Władysław owned the property.

The estate included land for a kitchen garden, arable land, forest and undefined land. After the 1861 land reform and the abolition of serfdom a portion of the land was sold to rural peasants.

=== Grzegorz Łukaszewicz – 1874–1917 ===
On April 20, 1874 Grzegorz Łukaszewicz (1843–1917) bought Lapšiai Manor at an auction.

The Łukaszewicz family in the 19th century came from the middle nobility. They were Polish intellectuals, mostly living in Poland. The family was Catholic. Grzegorz and his wife Stanisława (1857–1934) had seven children: four boys and three girls.

Grzegorz had taken part in the 1863 January Uprising. In the aftermath, the Russians came looking for ‘Pan Grzegorz’. The local villagers swore on the Bible that they didn't know where ‘Pan Grzegorz’ was – as he always went by ‘Michał’. As it was nearly impossible in those days to swear a false oath on a Bible – either they never knew his first name was Grzegorz or they did know, but were truthfully answering the (wrong) question that the Russian authorities were asking them.

Grzegorz and Stanisława built the stone mansion sitting high on the river precipice. In 1876 the estate consisted of 203.4 hectares of land.

Grzegorz Łukaszewicz died in 1917 and was buried in Bernardine Cemetery, Vilnius.

=== Witold Łukaszewicz – 1917–1926 ===
Lapšiai estate was divided between Grzegorz’ wife, daughters and sons.

Witold Łukaszewicz (1888-1926) inherited Lapšiai Manor. Witold married Wanda Gryffin (1897-1988) and they had two children together.

In 1924 the estate consisted of a main brick manor house and thirteen wooden buildings, including barns, stores, a smithy, chicken coop and sauna.

=== Wanda Łukaszewicz (née Gryffin) – 1926–1988 ===
When Witold died of typhoid fever in 1926, Lapšiai Manor was inherited by his wife, Wanda Łukaszewicz (née Gryffin) (1897–1988). Witold was buried in Gelvonai Cemetery, Širvintos District. The manor farm was managed by a hired caretaker as the family mostly lived in Kaunas, where Wanda Łukaszewicz had a haberdashery workshop at 18 Kęstučio street (‘Satrija’). However, the family spent their summers in Lapšiai.

In 1928 Wanda married Romanas Chodakauskas (1883–1932), brother of First Lady Sofija Smetonienė (1884–1968). Romanas Chodakauskas summered at Lapšiai with Wanda. President Antanas Smetona (1874–1944) visited regularly with his wife Sofija Smetonienė and, after evenings of entertainment on the front lawn, slept in a bed in the corner of the ballroom.

On May 31, 1930 Wanda Chodakowski (née Gryffin) bought land from Jadvyga Mackevičaitės (67.8 ha) and Karolinai Paškauskaitei (67.8 ha), increasing the size of Lapšiai estate.

Romanas died in 1932, age 49. The estate continued to be managed by Wanda until the outbreak of World War II.

On October 15, 1940 Wanda ‘gave’ 278.5 ha to the ‘state land fund.’

=== World War II ===
Wanda Łukaszewicz-Chodakauskas (née Gryffin) and her family fled from the house and their country, eventually emigrating to Argentina and then Canada, where their descendants still live.

During the war some Dutch people lived in the manor using the land to grow vegetables.

=== The Soviet Period ===
In 1940 the estate was nationalized. During the war years the manor was given to German colonists to manage. The estate began to grow tobacco and vegetables.

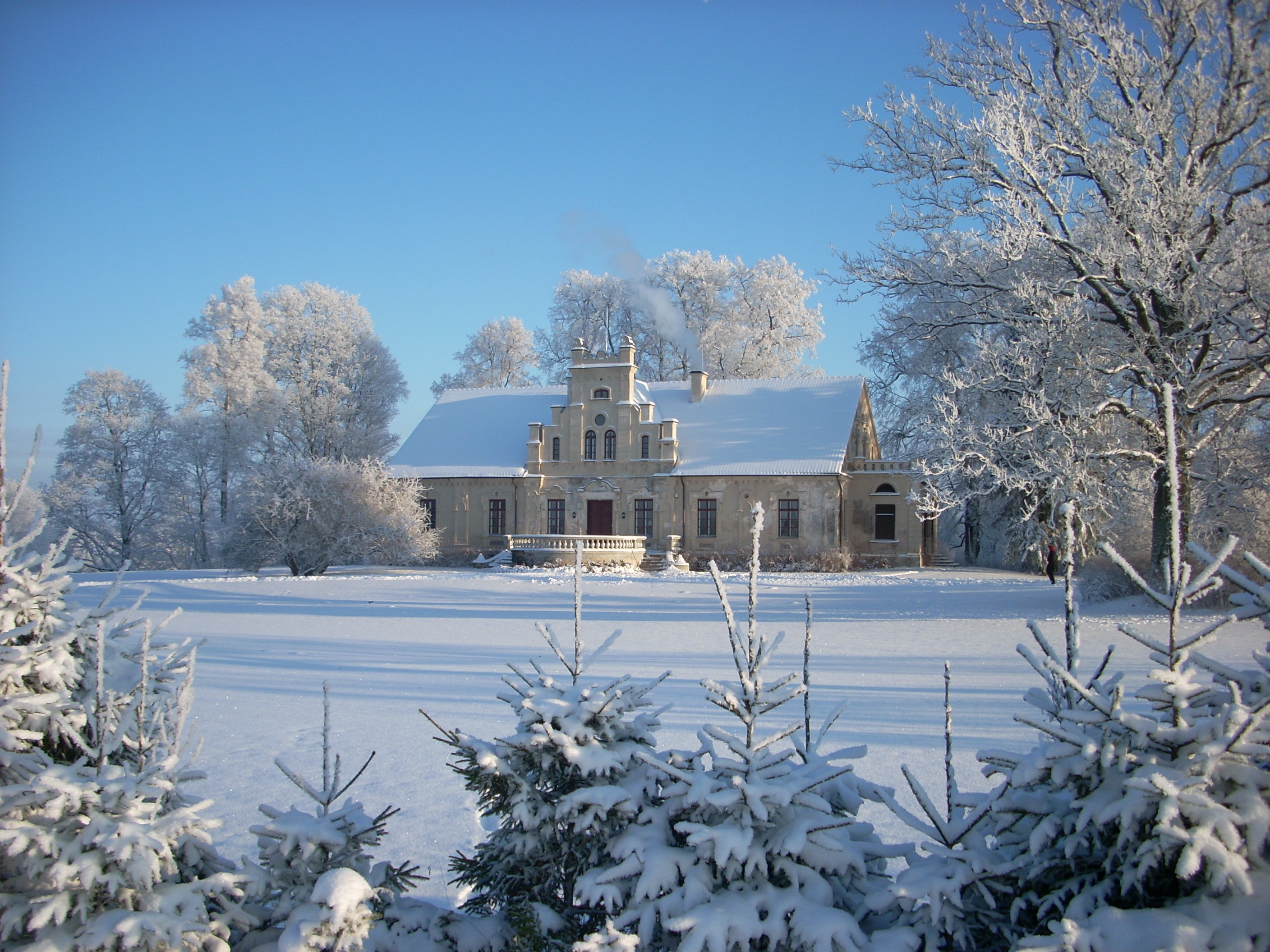
Lapšiai Manor 2009

In 1945, 244.2 hectares of land was taken by the State Land Fund, and the manor was incorporated into a Soviet collective farm. The estate was damaged during the Soviet period: farm buildings were run down, and the mansion was used as a granary for the collective farm and a storage barn for farm machinery.

Wanda Łukaszewicz-Chodakauskas (née Gryffin) died in 1988.

=== Ona Buklienė – 2001–present ===
After the restoration of Lithuanian independence in 1991, the estate buildings remained abandoned for a decade.

The house was eventually bought from Wanda's son, Roman Chodakowski (1932–2001), by architect Ona Buklienė and her husband in 2001.

The new owners renovated the manor house and a nearby wooden granary between 2001and 2003.

== Architecture ==
Lapšiai Manor's architecture is characteristic of the Historicist period, and is marked by a rather whimsical eclectic decor and an original facade composition; its central portion is emphasized by a fanciful stepped pediment with obelisks on both sides, rustic pilasters and semi-circular mansard windows.

Prior to the beginning of the 20th century, the mansion had an elegant wooden glassed-in verandah decorated with openwork carvings. This addition was replaced some time later by a semi-circular terrace with a decorative balustrade, that gave the main entrance a sense of grandeur.
