= Romanas Chodakauskas =

Lithuanian military officer

- Born: August 9, 1883; Žvanagala, Lithuania
- Died: October 8, 1932 (aged 49); Kaunas, Lithuania
- Burial place: Old City Cemetery, Kaunas
- Alma mater: Vladimir Military Academy, St. Petersburg
- Military career
- Allegiance: Lithuania
- Branch: Military Attaché and Military Court
- Rank: Colonel
- Website: http://kariuomene.kam.lt/en/home

Romanas Chodakauskas (August 9, 1883 – October 8, 1932) was the Lithuanian military attaché to Berlin, a Lithuanian Diplomat in the Ukrainian People's Republic, a Colonel in the Lithuanian Military Court, and brother of Sofija Smetonienė, Tadas Chodakauskas and Jadvyga Tūbelienė. Romanas was a member of the Chodakowski noble family.

== Early life and education ==
=== Žvanagala ===
Romanas was born in Žvanagala manor, Žvanagala, Joniškėlis Parish, Lithuania, on August 9, 1883, to Antanas Chodakauskas (1850-1925) and Marija-Johana Chodakauskienė (1852-1910).

He was baptized in Vaskai Church, by Rev. Heronim Jaksztowitch, the vicar of the church, on August 30, 1883. His grandfather Kazimierz Chodakowski (1814-1905) was his godfather. His aunt, Stanisława (née Giedroyć) (1855-1933), wife of Jan Chodakowski (1849-1926), was his godmother. Another of Romanas’ aunts, Cecilija Chodakowska (1853-1937), was also in attendance.

Romanas’ grandfather, Kazimierz, and his father, Antanas, leased land at Žvanagala estate, owned by the Dokalski family.

=== Gavėnonių Estate ===
Within the year, the family moved to Gavėnonių Estate, Pakruojis region. The estate was owned by the descendants of Felicician Karp (1821-1880), the owner of Joniškėlis manor.

At Gavėnonių Estate, Romanas' parents had three daughters - Sofija Chodakauskaitė (1884-1968), Kazimierza (1888-1889), and Jadvyga (1889-1959) - and one more son - Tadas Chodakauskas (1889-1959).

From a young age, Romanas and the other children were raised to be patriotic and socially active. Though the family spoke Polish among themselves, they were home-schooled in the Lithuanian language and spoke Lithuanian when conversing with the farm workers.

They were taught about Lithuanian culture and kept close relations with prominent Lithuanian intelligentsia and members of the Lithuanian National Revival Movement, including Jonas Jablonskis (1860-1930), Povilas Višinskis (1875-1906), Adomas Sketeris (1859-1916), Motiejus Čepas (1866-1962), and Petras Vileišis (1851-1926).

Romanas’ parents stressed the education of all their children. They studied foreign languages, read a variety of literature, were interested in music, stressed fair-mindedness and had wide-ranging views. The parents hired teachers or taught them themselves. According to historian Ingrida Jakubavičienė, Romanas' parents were:

"educated and enlightened nobles who dedicated their lives to their children, to family, to education, and to knowledge, but not to wealth."

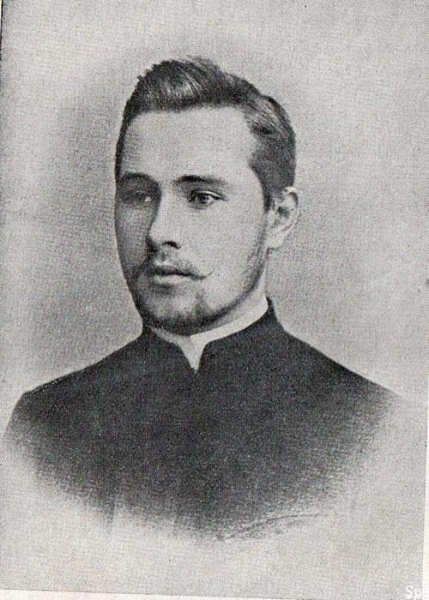
Antanas Smetona c1897

=== Antanas Smetona tutors Romanas ===
Romanas’ father was introduced to Jonas Jablonskis (1860-1930) by Romanas' niece, Gabrielė Petkevičaitė-Bitė (1861-1943).

Jablonskis was a distinguished Lithuanian linguist and promotor of the Lithuanian National Revival, who was teaching Greek and Latin at Jelgava Gymnasium. During summer vacations, Jablonskis collected information from native speakers in Lithuania for his linguistic studies.

The Chodakauskas and Jablonskis families became close and started regularly visiting each other. Jablonskis often spent summers with the Chodakauskas family.

Romanas’ father invited Lithuanian students, recommended by Jablonskis, to teach his children.

In the summer of 1895, Jablonskis recommended a young student of his, seventh-class student Antanas Smetona (1874-1944), to be the tutor for Romanas. Romanas was studying in preparation for the entrance exams to Jelgava Gymnasium and Smetona, being from a poor, farming background, needed the work.

Smetona had recently passed his entrance examinations for the Samogitian Diocesan Seminary in Kaunas. However, he had felt no great calling for the priesthood and enrolled into Jelgava Gymnasium instead. Jelgava Gymnasium was a cultural hub of the Lithuanian National Revival and attracted many future leaders in Lithuanian culture and politics, including Juozas Tūbelis (1882-1939) and Vladas Mironas (1880-1953), who later became Smetona's political companions. In particular, Lithuanian language and culture was openly promoted by Jablonskis, with whom Smetona developed a close friendship. Both Antanas Smetona and Jablonskis were great promoters of the Lithuanian language and culture. The Chodakowski family was soon inspired by their passion. Romanas’ youngest sister Jadvyga once asked Jablonskis, who was visiting the Chodakauskas house, “Who am I?” Jablonskis answered, “Well, how do you feel?” Jadvyga replied, “I feel Lithuanian.” “That's it!” Jablonskis exclaimed.

While teaching Romanas at Gavėnonių, Smetona met Sofija Chodakauskaitė, Romanas’ sister. A friendship soon developed between them. Antanas Smetona promised that when she graduated from Jelgava Girl's Gymnasium, he would return and propose to her.

Smetona and Sofija would later marry. Antanas Smetona would become the first and longest-standing President of Lithuania in Lithuania's history.

=== Jelgava Gymnasium ===
Romanas went to school at Jelgava Gymnasium. He probably started in 1895, as gymnasiums only accepted new pupils up to the age of twelve. He stayed on until he graduated.

His two sisters also went to gymnasium in Jelgava. When Sofija and Jadvyga were studying, their mother Marija-Johana spent a few years in a rented apartment in Jelgava with the girls. Romanas’ brother Tadas, also lived with them.

=== Kharkiv University ===
Romanas studied law at V. N. Karazin Kharkiv National University in Kharkiv. Kharkiv University was one of the major universities in the Russian Empire at the time. He graduated in 1912.

=== Vilnius ===
Romanas returned to Lithuania and settled in Vilnius. On December 16, 1913, he married Janina Turaitė-Jacunskiėne (b.1884) in the Lithuanian Evangelical Reformed Church (Pylimo gatvė 18, Vilnius). On August 20, 1914, Romanas’ first child, Miroslavas (1914-1952) was born at Topolis, Kupiškis region, Lithuania, the home of his wife's parents.

=== Daina Society ===
While living in Vilnius, Romanas was a member of the Daina Society, a cultural and artistic society that sought to revive the national Lithuanian spirit by means of Lithuanian song. He served as the chair between 1913 and 1915. He later was a member when the Daina Society was based in Kaunas.

=== Vladimir Military Academy ===
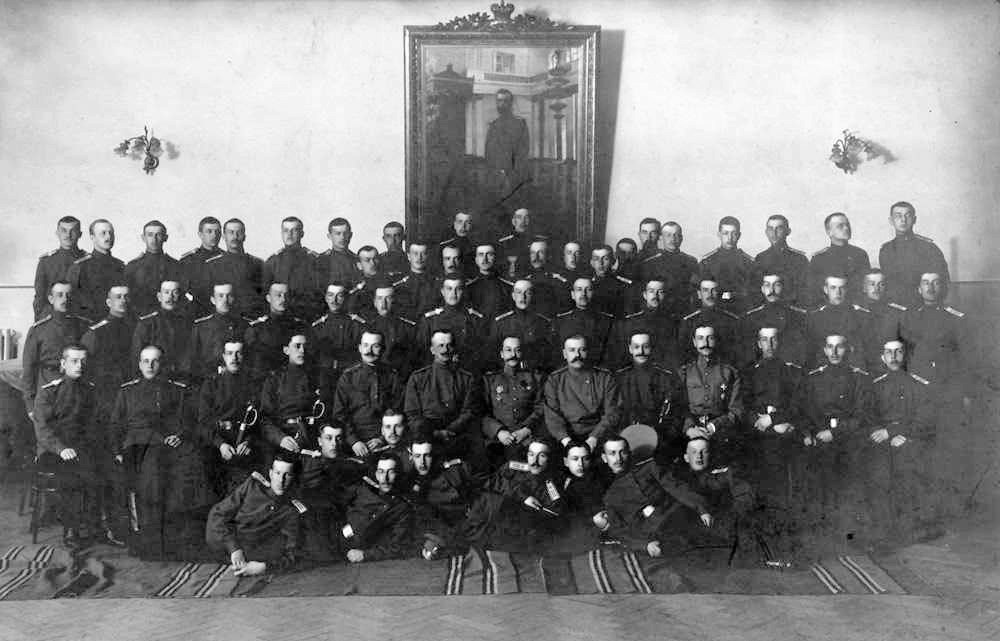
Vladimir Military Academy 1916

Romanas trained at the Vladimir Military Academy in St. Petersburg. The Vladimir Military Academy was a military educational institution of the Russian Imperial Army, which trained infantry officers. It was located at Malaya Grebetskaya Str., 5, 9; B. Grebetskaya (now Pionerskaya) st., 18 St. Petersburg and had been operational since December 1, 1869. In the fall of 1914, with the outbreak of WWI, the school switched from a two-year to a four-month accelerated program. Graduates were increased from 400 to 885 and received the rank of ensign upon graduation. Romanas graduated in 1915.

== Military service ==
Romanas served in the Russian Imperial Army in World War I.

=== Ukraine ===
In 1917, he served in the Lithuanian Exiles General Representative Office in Ukraine, where he acted on behalf of the Lietuvos Tarybos (the Council of Lithuania).

=== Germany ===
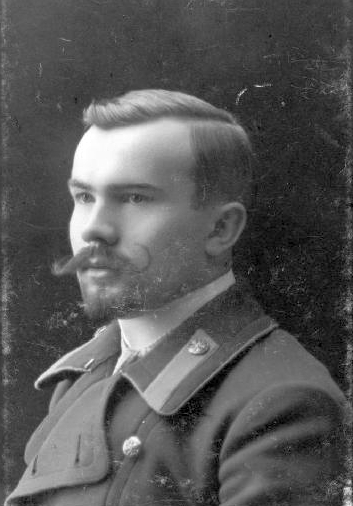
Martynas Yčas. 1913

In August 1918, Romanas was dispatched by the Council of Lithuania on a diplomatic mission to Germany to assist with returning Lithuanian Prisoners of War held in that country.

=== Ukraine ===
On November 19, 1918, the Government of the Republic of Lithuania delegated Romanas to be the representative fordiplomatic affairs to the Ukrainian People's Republic (Ukraine had first proclaimed its independence from the Russian Republic on January 25, 1918) and Romania. His work in Kiev included agitating Lithuanian officers and helping Lithuanian citizens to return to Lithuania.

Also working in Ukraine was Martynas Yčas (1885-1914), who began work at the beginning of June, 1918. The Council of Lithuania appointed him as the representative in Ukraine to deal with the return of war refugees and exiles.

As the Germans retreated, Romanas returned to Gomel, at that time part of the Ukrainian State. In December 1918, Romanas had been absent from his post in Kiev for several weeks.

On January 7, 1919, the Bolsheviks invaded Ukraine. Ukraine declared war once again against Russia on January 16, 1919. The two main directions of the Bolshevik's forces were onto Kiev and Kharkiv. By mid-February, the Bolsheviks controlled the Kiev Governorate.

Once the Bolsheviks controlled the area, Romanas returned to Kiev. By late January, with the Bolsheviks inquiring after him, Romanas went incognito to Vilnius. Before leaving, he organized the Minsk Lithuanian Exiles’ Committee. On January 27, 1919, Romanas was awarded the rank of captain.

=== Lithuanian Army ===
On February 2, 1919, Romanas was called to join the Lithuanian army.

Delegated to the Ministry of National Defence, he was responsible for special affairs.

He was later the representative for the Ministry of National Defence responsible for jurisdiction.

=== Military Attaché in Berlin ===
Romanas served in Berlin as the Military Attaché at the Lithuanian Embassy under Jurgis Šaulys (1879-1948), who was appointed Lithuania's first minister extraordinary and plenipotentiary in Germany on November 23, 1918.

The military relationship between Lithuania and Germany was crucial for Lithuania's survival. Lithuania feared both the Bolsheviks from Russia and the army of Poland. Germany, until only recently the occupying power in Lithuania, was seen as an important strategic partner.

=== Military Court in Kaunas ===
On June 7, 1920, Romanas was transferred to the Military Court.

By August 1921, he was working as the Public Defender's Assistant in the Military Court in Kaunas.

On May 22, 1923, Romanas was promoted to the rank of major.

On July 11, 1923, he was again promoted, this time to the rank of lieutenant colonel.

On October 1, 1923, Romanas was given a permanent position in the Military Court - whereas before he was temporary. On September 15, 1926, Romanas was awarded the rank of colonel in the Military Court, and then on October 1, 1926, due to health concerns, he was transferred to the Reserves.

== Family ==
As a part of the Chodakowski family, a noble house dating to the Polish–Lithuanian Commonwealth, Romanas' family were also heavily involved in the political sphere of interwar Lithuania.

His sister, Sofija Smetonienė, was an active player in the woman's movement and married to Antanas Smetona, the first and long-standing President of Lithuania.

Romanas’ other sister, Jadvyga Tūbelienė, was one of the founders of the Lithuanian Council of Women, a writer and diplomat, and married to Juozas Tūbelis, the long-standing Prime Minister of Lithuania.

His brother, Tadas Chodakauskas, was the mayor of Panevėžys, the fifth-largest city in Lithuania.

His cousin, Gabrielė Petkevičiatė-Bitė, was an active worker in social rights and one of the foremost writers in the country.

=== Daukšiagirė, Second Marriage and Son ===
In 1926, Romanas Chodakauskas bought Daukšiagirė estate. There he received guests, including his sister, Sofija Smetonienė, and her husband President Antanas Smetona. The local residents watched with amazement as the first lady of the country walked around Daukšiagirė with her daughter, Marija Smetonaitė (1905-1992). However, Romanas did not own Daukšiagirė for long. In 1928, he sold it by auction.

On June 22, 1928, Romanas married Wanda Łukaszewicz (née Gryffin) at Vytautas' the Great Church in Kaunas. The officiating priest was Juozas Tumas-Vaižgantas (1869–1933). The witnesses to the marriage were President Antanas Smetona and Gvidonas Ruscicas.

Wanda had been married once before, to Witold Łukaszewicz (1888-1926) - a cousin of painter Bronisława Łukaszewicz (1885-1962). Wanda had two children from the previous marriage.

Romanas lived with Wanda and her children in Kaunas and spent summers at Wanda's estate in Vilnius District, Lapšiai Manor.

In 1930/1931, the family address was Laisvės aleja 58, Kaunas. In 1932, their address was first at Kęstučio gatvė 27 (courtyard), Kaunas, then Kalnu str. 13, before finally Vytauto pr. 14 (now 30) Kaunas, flat Nr. 6 (Juozas Daugirdas Apartment Building). They lived on the fourth floor of five.

On April 7, 1932, Romanas’ son Roman Chodakowski (1932-2001) was born in Kaunas. He was baptized at their home in the Juozas Daugirdas Apartment Building. President Smetona was Roman's godfather. Romanas’ sister, Jadvyga Tūbelienė, was the godmother.

== Death ==
On October 9, 1932, Romanas died from a heart attack.

The procession from Romanas' house to the Kaunas Cathedral Basilica was described by the press:

On October 9, 6 pm the body of Romanas Chodakauskas was taken from his house on Vytautas Avenue to the Basilica. The Republican President Smetona, his sisters Sofia, Jadvyga, Tūbelis, the Minister of National Defence of Lithuania, B Giedraitis, and the Commander of Kaunas Command, relatives and many other people, participated in the procession.

The funeral took place on Monday, October 10, 1932 at the Kaunas Cathedral Basilica.

Romanas was buried at the Old City Cemetery, on Vytauto prospektas, Kaunas - now Ramybės park. Writer and priest Juozas Tumas-Vaižgantas (1869–1933) and University of Lithuania law professor Petras Leonas (1864-1938) spoke at the grave.

A memorial plaque was installed in Ramybės Park in 2018 to commemorate those who fought for Lithuanian independence.
