= Jadvyga Tūbelienė =

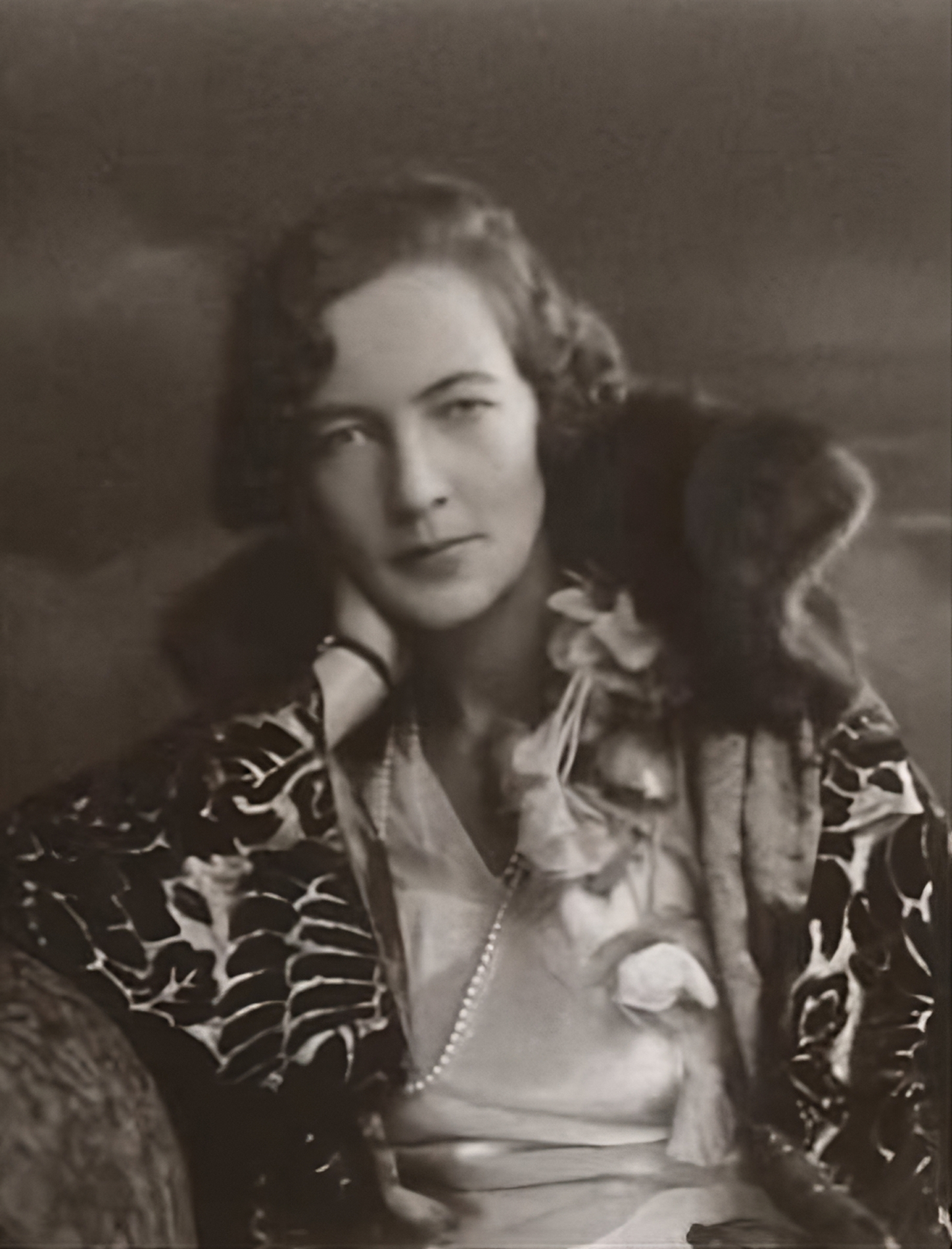
- Tūbelienė - Chodakauskaitė in ~1930
- Born: January 11, 1891; Gavėnonys Estate, Lithuania
- Died: October 4, 1988 (aged 97)
- Burial place: Putnam Cemetery, Connecticut
- Education: Bestuzhev Courses, St. Petersburg Imperial University
- Occupations: Writer, journalist, head of the Information Bureau in Bern and Paris and Deputy Chief of Mission to Switzerland
- Board member of: Lithuanian Women’s Council
- Spouse: Prime Minister Juozas Tūbelis
- Children: Marija Rima Tūbelaitė (1923-2014)
- Parent(s): Antanas Chodakauskas (1850-1925) and Maria-Joanna Chodakauskienė (1852-1910)

Jadvyga Tūbelienė (née Chodakauskaitė) (January 11, 1891 – October 4, 1988) was one of the founders of the Lithuanian Women's Council, a writer, journalist, head of the Information Bureau in Bern and Paris, and Deputy Chief of Mission to Switzerland. She was also married to Juozas Tūbelis, the longest-standing Prime Minister of Lithuania. She was involved in many charity organizations and is considered one of the most influential women in interwar Lithuania. Jadvyga was a member of the Chodakowski noble family.

== Early life and education (1891–1909) ==
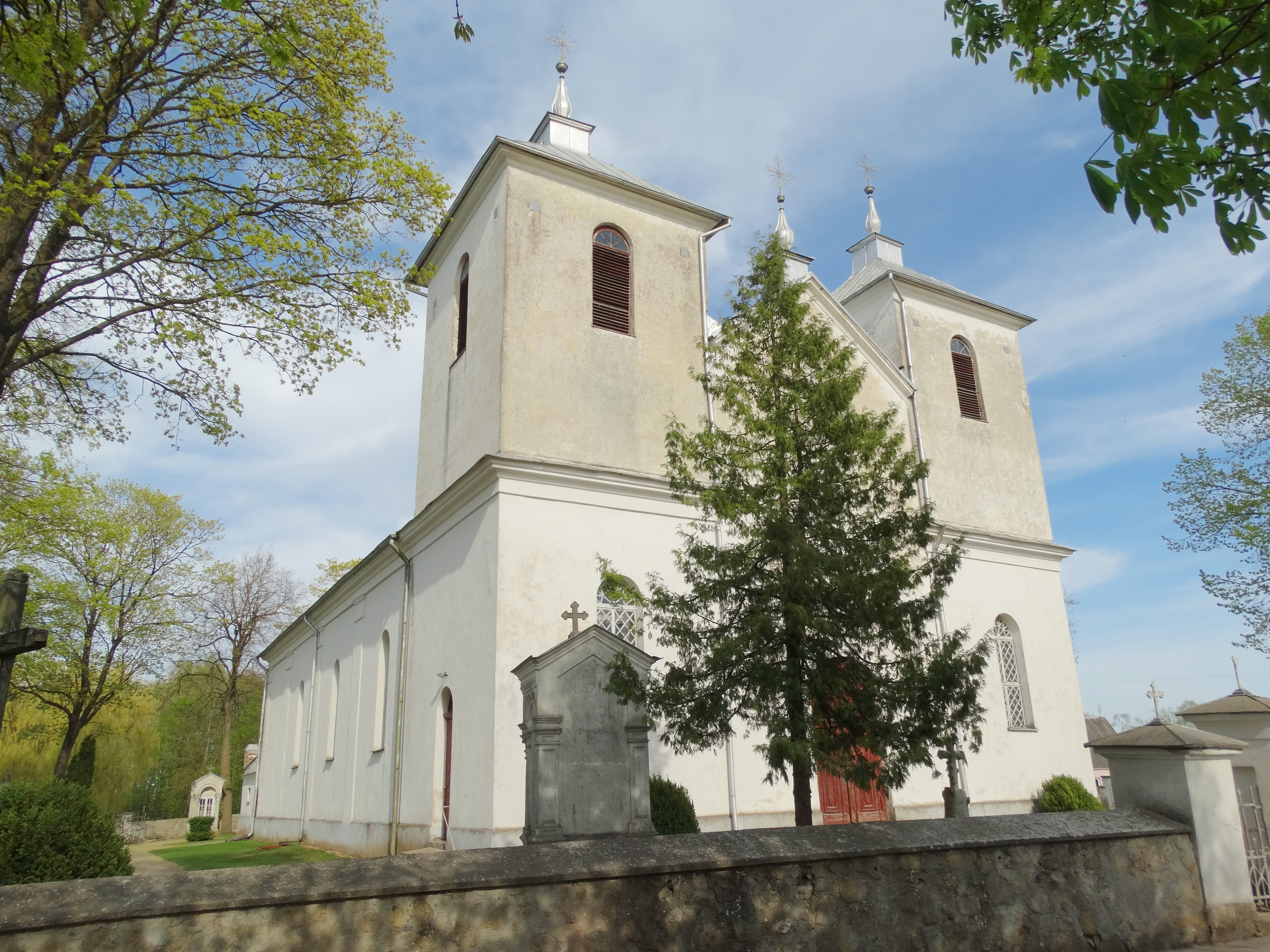
Pašvitinys St Trinity Church

Jadvyga Chodakauskaitė was born on January 11, 1891, at Gavėnonys Estate, near Šiaudiniai in Pakruojis District, to Antanas Chodakauskas (1850–1925) and Maria-Joanna Chodakowska (1852–1910). She had two older brothers, Romanas Chodakauskas (1883–1932) and Tadas Chodakauskas (1889–1959), and one older sister, Sofija Smetonienė (1884–1968).

Jadvyga was baptized on February 17, 1891, by the pastor of Pašvitinys St Trinity Church, Juozas Rimkevičius. The godparents were Donatas Jasienskis (brother-in-law of the playwright Gabrielius Landsbergis and the father-in-law of the writer Pranas Mašiotas) and Teofilia Chodakauskaitė (born 1856) (Jadvyga's aunt).

=== Jelgava (1899–1905) ===
Jadvyga began studying at Jelgava Girl's Gymnasium when she was eight.

When she was in her second or third form, the 1905 Russian Revolution broke out. Revolutionary fervour found its way into the halls of the gymnasium and Jadvyga “got involved in all that mayhem.” In a later interview, Jadvyga said:

"A revolution started in Russia and the pupils started to riot, throwing stink bombs at the portraits of the Tsar in our school. We were all wildly passionate and somehow I got involved in all that mayhem. The principal grabbed me by the arm, and she said: “Aren’t you ashamed? A manor girl entering into league with Latvians and Jews? A school inspector arrived from Petrograd to question… us to find out why the riots occurred in the schools of Mintauja. The entire class chose me as the spokesperson, to accuse the principal and all of the teachers. I agreed and I stood up in front of everyone and rhymed off the list of accusations. It was all down to freedom. The thirst for freedom was very much alive then. After that my parents received a confidential notice to collect me from school. My mother came to take me home. I have to give my parents credit for not scolding me or asking me anything. They gathered up my belongings and took me back to the farm."

=== Vilnius (1905–1909) ===
Jadvyga was sent to Vilnius to study at the private Vera Prozorovienė Gymnasium. She attended classes in religion, Russian, German, Latin, French, history, geography, algebra, arithmetic, geometry, writing, drawing, and singing, and from the fifth grade onwards, physics and chemistry. She graduated in 1909, winning the gold medal.

Jadvyga was interested in history and was fluent in foreign languages; in her parents’ house, she spoke Polish (with a Warsaw dialect), German and later Lithuanian. Later in life, Jadvyga would learn flawless Russian, French, and English. Jadvyga also loved music and art. She did not, however, enjoy reading or writing.

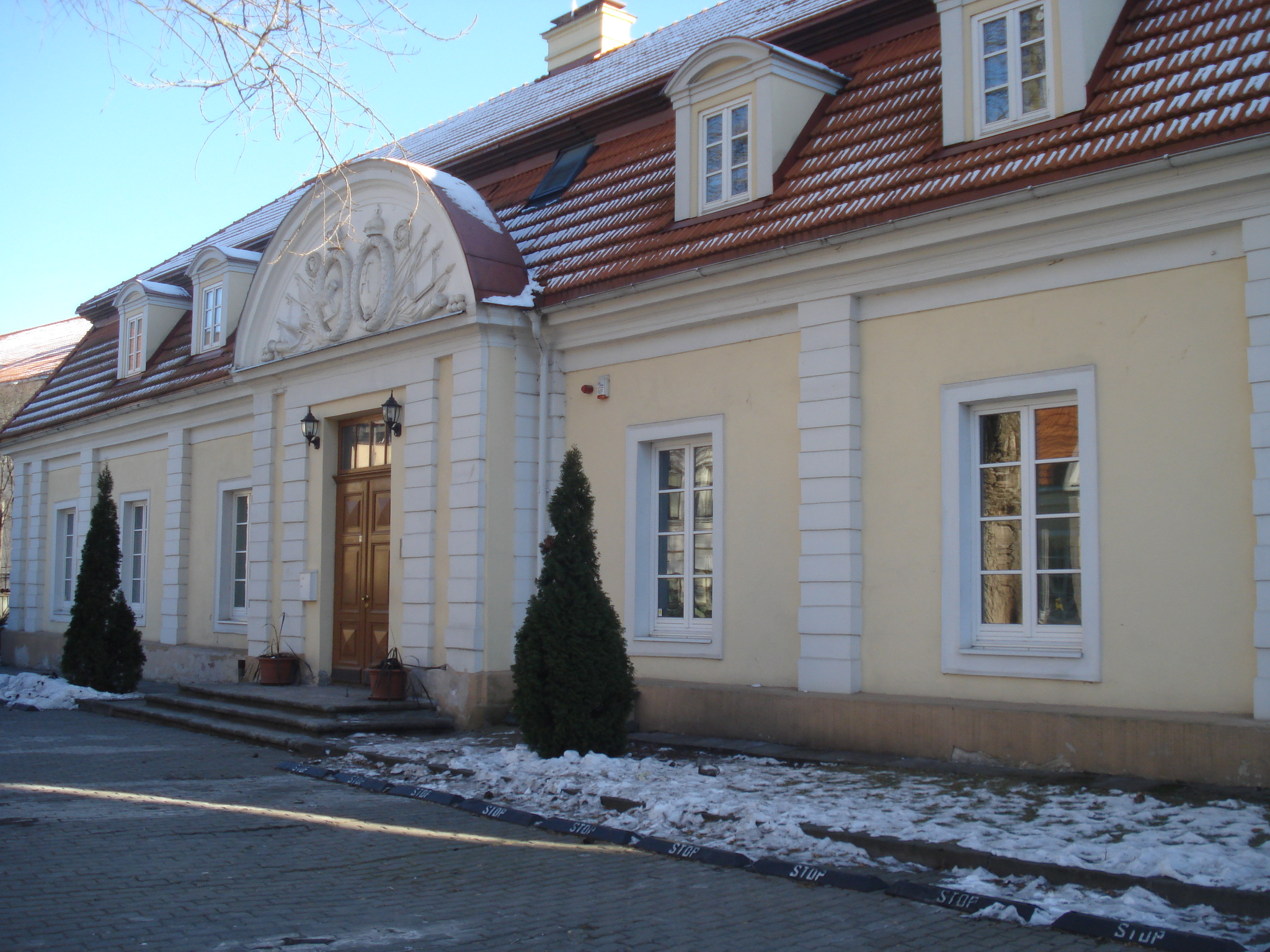
1Tilto Street, Vilnius

While studying in Vilnius, Jadvyga lived with her sister Sofija Smetonienė at the ‘Smetona House'. As a major gathering place for the most prominent actors in the National Revival Movement, almost every evening, political debate took place and Lithuanian musicians came to play and sing. Living in the Smetona home meant that from her youth, Jadvyga met many Lithuanian intellectuals and heard political debate. One of the people she met was Smetona’s school friend and her future husband, Juozas Tūbelis (1882–1939). According to Jadvyga:

"It was a great centre of Lithuanian activity, Smetona’s house. Everybody came there, all kinds of parties"

Jadvyga attended the first Lithuanian opera Birutė by playwright Gabrielius Landsbergis-Žemkalnis and composer Mikas Petrauskas. It was shown on November 6, 1906, in the current Lithuanian National Philharmonic in Vilnius.

=== St. Petersburg (1909–1915) ===
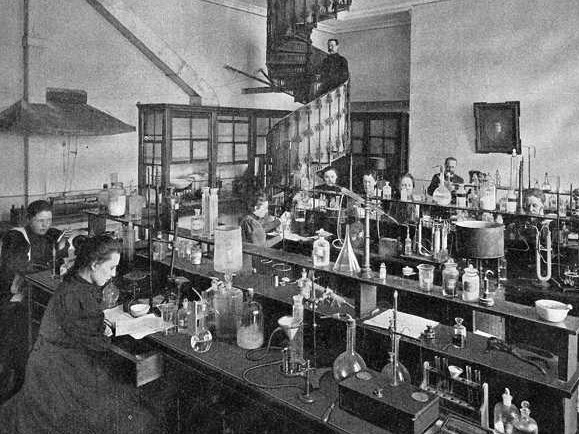
Laboratory of Bestuzhev courses

Between 1909 and 1915, Jadvyga studied history and classical philology, first at the Woman's High School and then at the Bestuzhev Courses, both in St. Petersburg. She had wanted to study art at the Academy of Arts in St. Petersburg, but her parents had strongly objected. St. Petersburg had a large number of Lithuanian students, making the city a major centre of Lithuanian activity. During her studies, Jadvyga taught Lithuanian language classes and Lithuanian history at a gymnasium for Lithuanian refugees. As a student, she worked on the editorial board of the Lietuviu Balsas (en: ‘Lithuanian Voice’).

At the time, Augustinas Voldemaras (1883–1942) was a professor at St. Petersburg Imperial University. Voldemaras lent Jadvyga books that were not available to buy and were otherwise unobtainable, even by Jadvyga's professors. Jadvyga knew Voldemaras well, as Voldemaras was a good friend of her brother-in-law, Antanas Smetona.

Jadvyga went to the theatre often in St. Petersburg. As she would later tell it:

"I probably spent more time at the theatre, more than at the university. One didn’t need to study to see performances. We didn’t have much money, but I found legitimate and illegitimate ways to see all the operas, and the ones that Chaliapin sang in, I saw several times."

In 1915, she graduated from the Bestuzhev Courses for women.

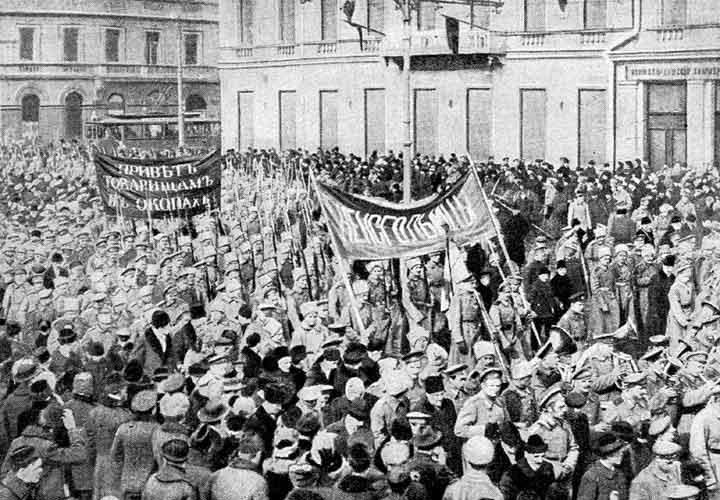
Soldiers marching in Petrograd, March 1917

In 1917, Jadvyga passed the state examinations at Petrograd University (earlier called St. Petersburg Imperial University) and received her diploma. Jadvyga gave a lecture course on French Revolutionary History. The university suggested she remain as an assistant, with the view to becoming a teacher.

However, after the October 1917 coup in St. Petersburg, the Bolsheviks began to transform the tsarist Russian administration. This affected the entire education system. As the Council of Lithuania increasingly sought the country's independence, some Lithuanian intellectuals working in Russia were looking to participate in the creation of the new state.

Jadvyga decided not to work at the university and instead returned to Lithuania through Sweden. She was accompanied by a young lawyer, Tadas Petkevičius.

== On the road to independence (1917–1919) ==
=== Vilnius (1917–1918) ===
Back in Vilnius, Jadvyga first worked as the secretary at the Lithuanian Ministry of Foreign Affairs headed by Voldemaras. She was then commissioned by the Council of Lithuania to organize the publication of the Lithuanian newspaper 'Das Neue Litauen’ in the German language in Berlin. In Jadvyga’s own words:

"I returned to Lithuania while it was still occupied by the Germans. The Council was waiting to find someone to go to Germany and start a newspaper that would defend Lithuanian’s interests in Germany. It would be an important newspaper because we needed to convey our message to the West. When I came back, my name was put forward for this task. Smetona talked me into going and explained what to do. So I was in great spirits when I left."

=== Berlin (1918–1919) ===
The task of ‘Das Neue Litauen’ was to win over public opinion in Germany and Lithuania for the establishment of a Lithuanian state under German control.

As it had definite political aims, the newspaper's content was heavily censored by the German authorities. Jadvyga sometimes wrote articles that were not looked on kindly by the owners of the journal. One time, in Jadvyga's words, the German-Baltic baron Friedrich von der Ropp (1879–1964), who had established ‘Das Neue Litauen’, came to her and said:

“Verggesse sie nicht (en: do not forget) that we are in a time of war and that you are in Germany. You are in Berlin. Do you know what it means this?” - he took a copy of Das Neue Litauen from the desk - "you are the rédacteur, do you know what this means, this little black triangle on the upper right corner of the front page?” So, I told him, “It’s my paper, but I never paid it any attention. I have never noticed this triangle before.” “I will explain very well what it is!” he said, “It means that this magazine has the approval of the foreign office.” I believed him that it was so, but I didn’t know anything about it. This article which I wrote myself, this long article about the German occupation of Lithuania, and how they mishandled the people."

On at least one occasion, to the great displeasure of Baron von der Ropp, Jadvyga took an article that contained opinions von der Ropp would have disapproved of, to Vorwätts, the socialist paper, to have published.

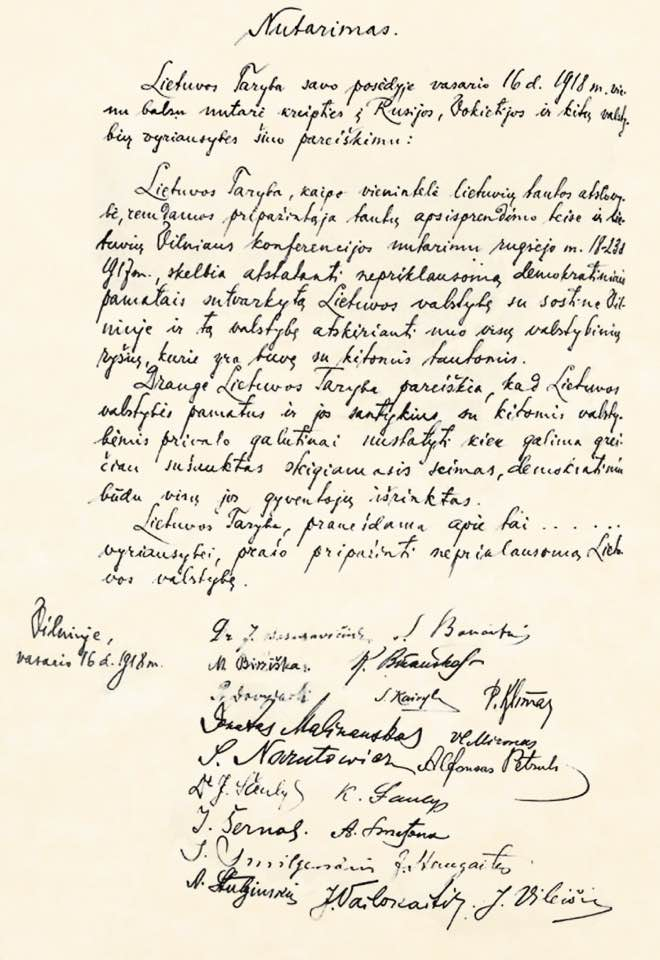
Act of Independence of Lithuania

=== Smuggling the Act of Independence into Germany (1918) ===
When Lithuania declared Independence on February 16, 1918, Germany (who was still the occupying power in Lithuania) did not support such a declaration and hindered any attempts to establish the proclaimed independence. It was important that the Council of Lithuania announce the declaration to the world and so Jadvyga was assigned the task of taking the Act to Berlin as quickly as possible so that the news would spread abroad.

Jadvyga translated the Act into German and secretly gave it to her friend, Oscar Wöhrle (1890–1946), the editor of Zeitung der Zehnten Armee, who carried it to Berlin the following day.

The Declaration first appeared in the German press: first in Das neue Litauen, in Vossiche Zeitung on February 18, 1918, and in Tägliche Rundschau on February 19, 1918. A bit later, it made the press in the United States.

Wilhelm Karl, Duke of Urach

=== Duke Wilhelm Von Urach and Lithuania (1918) ===
The Declaration of Independence did not, however, alter German occupational rule. One possibility Germany was considering was to annex Lithuania to the German lands of Prussia or Saxony. The Council of Lithuania was forced to act quickly to rescue the fledgling state. It decided to set up relations with the Catholic State of Württemberg and to invite the Prince of Württemberg, Wilhelm Karl, Duke of Urach to become the King of Lithuania, Mindaugas II. Through such a decision, the Council sought to avoid potential annexation.

A Lithuanian delegation was sent to Germany to negotiate with Duke Wilhelm Von Urach. They drafted a twelve-point list of conditions that the Duke had to accept before his election. The Duke promised that he would learn the Lithuanian language and live in Lithuania full time.

On June 4, 1918, the Presidium of the Council of Lithuania voted confidentially to establish the hereditary Kingdom of Lithuania. The Lithuanian legation delivered the decision and list of conditions to Duke Wilhelm Karl and his son and heir apparent Karl Gero, Duke of Urach.

They accepted it on July 1.

The signed document then had to be smuggled back to Lithuania. The task was given to Jadvyga.

As Jadvyga later told it:

"Then a delegation finally went to Berlin to visit and get his signature. Voldemaras was in that delegation, as were Father Purickis and Alšauskas. And Voldemaras came over to me and said: ‘We can’t bring back his signature with us to Lithuania. There’s a war on as well as an occupation government, but maybe you could take it? No one will bother searching you.’ I was completely unafraid… I was overjoyed to have that opportunity. ‘Alright’, I said, ‘I’ll go.’"

Jadvyga was taking drops for her eyes and, before she was due to leave, she was struck blind. She phoned Voldemaras to tell him she couldn't do it. Voldemaras and Purickis rushed over and helped her get ready. They stashed the document in her boot, and as Jadvyga told it:

"They put two-mark notes in my right pocket and one-mark notes in my left one. And they gave me some small change. They put me in the wagon, stashed my suitcase for me and left."

Jadvyga headed for Lithuania. The train stopped at the German border stop in Eitkūnai. There, Jadvyga had to transfer to another train to Vilnius. But only when she arrived at the station did she find out the train was late. The border police, realizing that they had a lot of time, started a thorough search of her luggage. As Jadvyga recalled:

"The woman who searched me gazed and gazed at my shoes. She undid my braids. She looked everywhere. She stripped me down almost naked. But she never checked inside my shoes."

The border police told her that the permit she had stated that she was to cross the border at a point other than Eitkūnai. The border police were therefore obliged to send a telegram to the Berlin Commandant to change the place of departure and allow her to pass through Eitkūnai. They took her to a hotel as she might have been able to catch the same train the next day. She slept in her high boots all night, without taking them off. The next morning, the new permit still hadn't arrived. The police also wondered how Jadvyga, who could see almost nothing, could go to the station by herself with all her luggage. Help came from an unexpected source. As Jadvyga later told it:

"I looked out the window and saw a captive Frenchman walking. I started shouting “monsieur, monsieur, over here!” He was very happy to hear the French language and ran over. I told him what was happening. He said, “don’t worry, I will take care of everything.”

As no new permit had arrived in the night, the border police told her to return to her hotel. And then Jadvyga said:

"I will not return, I said. I will not be able to catch the train. I will wait here where you want me, but I will not go back to the hotel. I will wait here for an answer. If it comes, I can catch the train at the last minute."

Her forthrightness had the desired effect and the border guards locked her in the office at the station until a decision was made. According to Jadvyga:

"As soon as they received a telegram from Berlin, the Germans arrived with such joy, they almost carried me, carried my suitcases, carried everything, threw me on that train. The Germans “gute Reise, gute Reise” [“safe journey, safe journey”] and drove away."

She returned to Lithuania and gave the Council of Lithuania the signed document.

== Lithuanian independence (1918–1940) ==
=== Ministry of Foreign Affairs in Vilnius (1918) ===
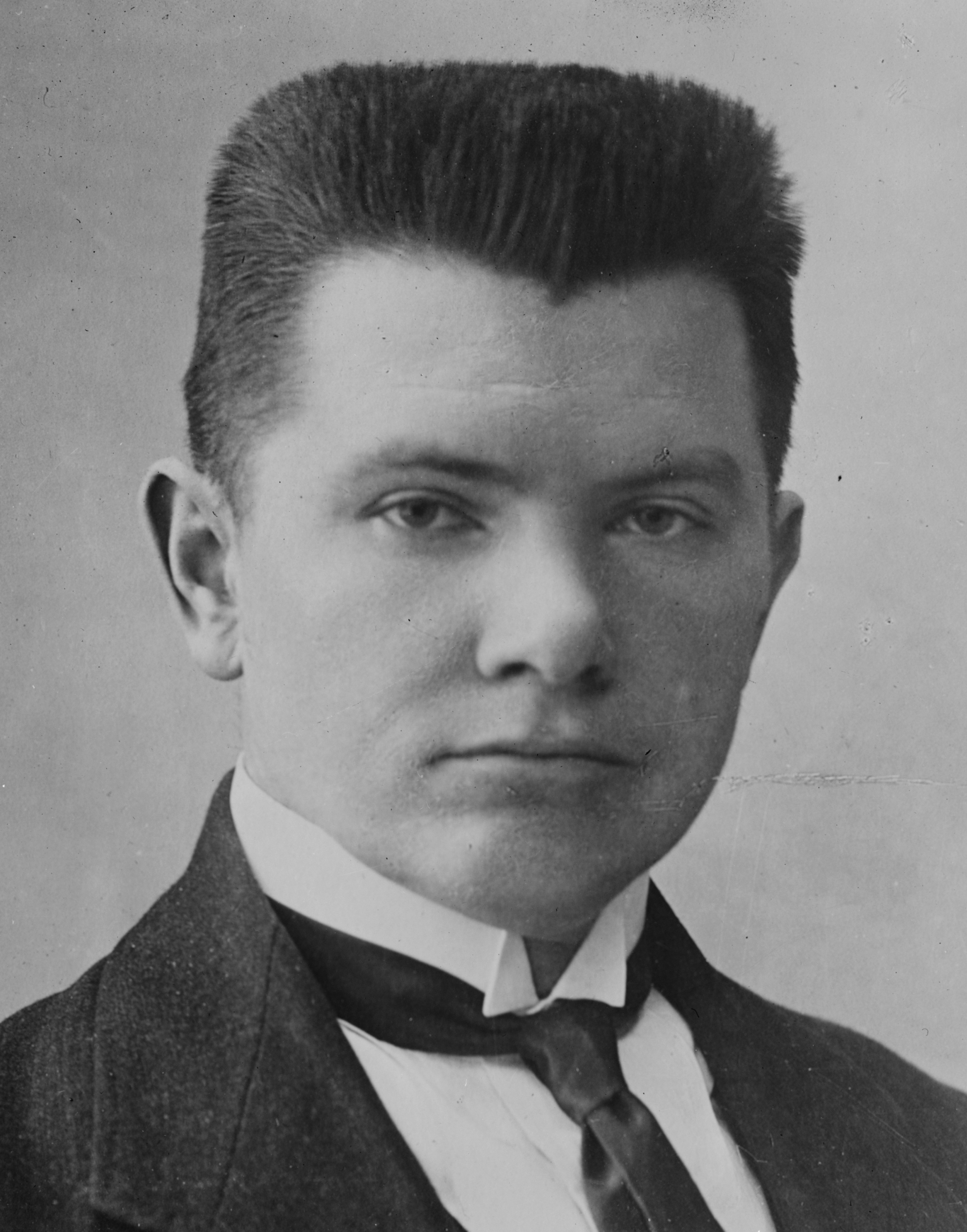
Augustinas Voldemaras

After the formation of the first Lithuanian Government, in which Augustinas Voldemaras became the Prime Minister, the formation of the Lithuanian state began. Skilled people were needed, so there was no shortage of jobs for educated and foreign-speaking women. Jadvyga started working at the Ministry of Foreign Affairs. The Ministry consisted of just three people: the Minister Augustinas Voldemaras, Petras Klimas, and Jadvyga Chodakauskaitė. Jadvyga's primary duties were to follow the German press.

=== Bern, Switzerland (1918) ===
In November 1918, Jadvyga was sent to Bern, Switzerland, where she worked at the Lithuanian Information Bureau, providing her knowledge of Lithuania to the major European telegraph agencies (inc. Havas, Reuters, and Stefan). She was good friends with Dr. Michael Bühler (1853–1925), who was the rédacteur en chef (en: editor-in-chief) of the Bund, and Dr. Lüdi, the editor-in-chief of the Swiss Telegraphic Agency.

In 1918, Jadvyga was deputized by Vladas Daumantas, Lithuanian ambassador to Switzerland, becoming the first woman in the Republic of Lithuania employed in the diplomatic service. When Daumantas left for several months to Lithuania, Jadyvga took over his work. As Jadvyga later put it:

There was a chargé d'affaires there (in Bern), a man. When I came to Switzerland he was there, but then he was called back to Lithuania for something and I was left in his place. So, I was signing the diplomatic passports (laughs) and writing notes to the government.

In this position, Jadvyga played a leading role in obtaining Swiss recognition of Lithuania's independence.

On December 16 1918, Jurgis Šaulys, the Lithuanian envoy to Switzerland, was told that the Swiss Foreign Office had agreed to permit Jadvyga to remain in Switzerland to work with Vladas Daumantas, the Council of Lithuania's representative in Switzerland. This action amounted to de facto recognition of the Lithuanian government by the Swiss government and months later, the Swiss admitted this. The Swiss were, therefore, among the first to grant Lithuania de facto recognition.

=== Paris Peace Conference (1919) ===
When Jadvyga was called to the Paris Peace Conference in Versailles, her friends in Bern hosted a big farewell dinner for her. Director Lüdi told her:

"We like working with you. You never once gave us false news or deceived us in any way and we would like to continue with you. We wish you all success in Paris. But we would like to warn you: don’t expect as easy work as you had here, with us trusting and believing you. For you, it will be much more difficult to work with the French press. With them you do not have to work with your ability but with your money."

From July 1919, Jadvyga organized and directed the Lithuanian Information Bureau in Paris, where the Lithuanian delegation to the Paris Peace Conference worked. The delegation was trying not only to win the recognition of the Lithuanian state, but also to defend Lithuania's territorial interests. In Jadvyga's own words, she submitted articles:

William Christian Bullitt

"…about Lithuanian affairs and about the problems of Lithuania, and to give the general description of this little country and what happens there, our aspirations and so forth."

In this position, she was not always looked on kindly, especially by the French, who accused her of only being there to serve the interests of the Germans.

Jadvyga's work in Paris included working with as many as twelve French newspapers, placing articles that looked like editorials. The French newspapers, with the exception of Journal des Debats, were all corrupt and only interested in money – one could place articles which were written as editorials as long as you paid enough. Jadvyga had to battle against Polish propagandists, who were placing articles in favour of the Polish position, at the expense of the Lithuanian one.

In Paris, Jadvyga developed a friendship with the American ambassador William Christian Bullitt. Jadvyga was often hostess alongside Bullitt at numerous dinner parties given in the American Embassy in Paris. Jadvyga also frequented a restaurant called Café Prunier, at 16 Avenue Victor Hugo, Paris, France. She would return often to the restaurant, in the 1920s, 1930's and when she visited Paris in the 1950s and 1960s.

== Kaunas, Lithuania (1920–1927) ==
=== Jadvyga marries Juozas Tūbelis (1920) ===
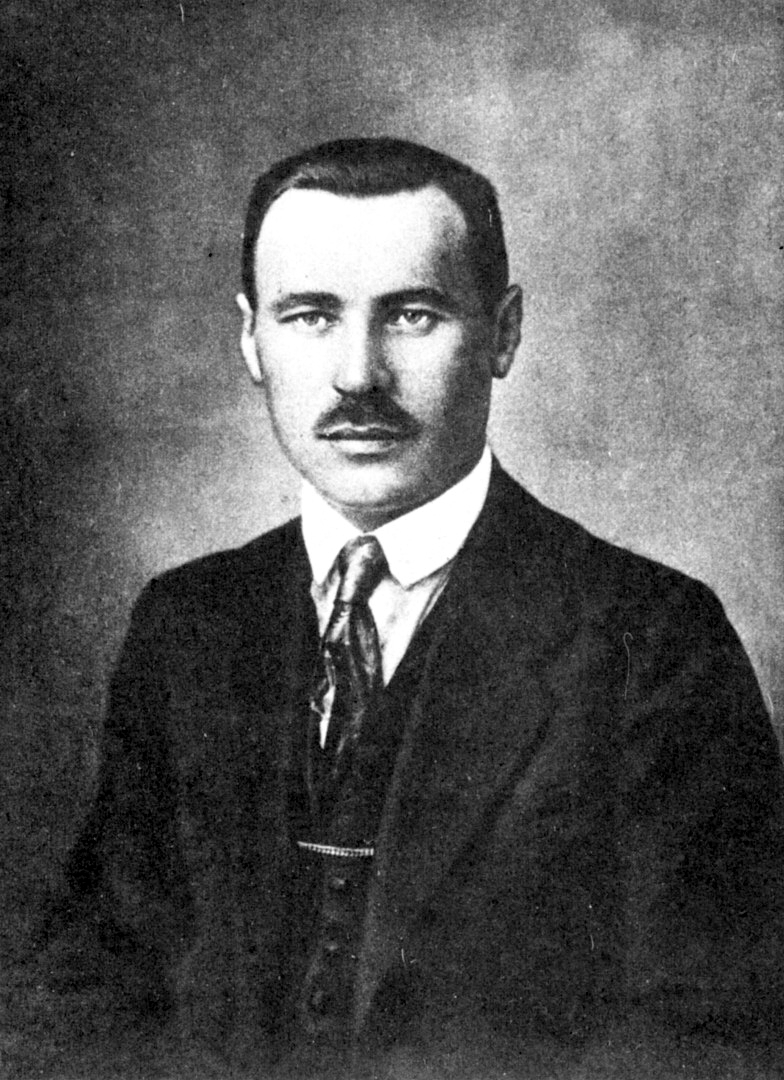
Juozas Tūbelis

On February 7, 1920, newly returned from Paris, Jadvyga married Juozas Tūbelis at Vytautas’ the Great Church in Kaunas. Rev. Juozas Tumas-Vaižgantas (1869–1933) officiated. As later told by Jadvyga:

"At my marriage at the President’s Palace, there was a doorman downstairs... A huge man, wide-shouldered... and Voldemaras was a very little man. So, Voldemaras got drunk, for once, on champagne which he had brought from Paris. We had all come from Paris and returned together to Lithuania, whereupon we got married. So, they decided that they would dance to this big event. So, Voldemaras and the doorman danced together wildly in this big hall of the Presidential Palace and crashed into walls, but they were drunk. Then all the chauffeurs went crazy. There was never such a night in town. They began running the streets with the cars. All the chauffeurs who were working for the government, for all the ministers and directors, ran the streets in the cars, making a terrible noise."

=== The Saccharine Scandal (1921) ===
For a short time, Jadvyga directed the Lithuanian News Agency, ELTA.

From 1920 to 1923, she worked at the Lithuanian Ministry of Foreign Affairs in Kaunas.

Part of her job was to process parcels that were being sent abroad by diplomatic post. Jadvyga discovered some boxes that seemed to contain various black market items, such as saccharine, being sent to the Soviet Union. She refused to stamp them and called the Minister of Foreign Affairs, Juozas Purickis. Purickis rushed over and stamped them himself.

Jadvyga shared her suspicions with her brother-in-law Antanas Smetona. Smetona then told Jadvyga's brother, Captain Tadas Chodakauskas, who spoke with the Defence Minister Colonel Konstantinas Žukas. Žukas stopped the train in Joniškis before it left Lithuania. Lithuanian counterintelligence seized three train cars worth of items. An inspection of the train cars revealed 299 boxes of sugar and 184 bags of wheat flour for the victims of the Russian famine of 1921-22, but also 194 boxes (almost 10 tonnes or 22,000 pounds) of saccharin, 13 boxes with foodstuffs (sausage, cocoa, butter, apples, pasta, rice, etc.), 4 kilograms (8.8 lb) of cocaine, four boxes of various fashion accessories, three boxes of alcohol, and a box of candies. At the time, saccharin was sold only by pharmacies and special procedures applied to its export. The cocaine was in a package addressed to Konstantinas Avižienis, Lithuanian military attaché in Moscow.

Foreign Minister Purickis lost his post over the scandal. Purickis and three other men were investigated, put on trial, but acquitted in February 1925.

=== Birth of Marija (1923) ===
On November 5, 1923, the birth of her daughter, Marija Rima Tūbelytė (1923–2014), almost killed Jadvyga. Racing to save the mother, and thinking the baby was stillborn, the doctor gripped the baby tightly with special pliers. Though both mother and daughter were saved, a nerve was pinched, causing Marija to have a disability for life.

The care of her child meant Jadvyga temporarily became less involved in state activities. She took over all family responsibilities so that her husband could focus on his work. The family lived in a rented, large, old apartment on the second floor of a house owned by Ozer Finkelstein, on Kęstučio gatvė (now Kęstutis gatvė 91). Their home became a centre of Lithuanian state activity, where in the evenings guests would, while drinking tea and smoking, discuss the issues of Lithuanian restoration. The family lived in the apartment for ten years.

== Return to public service (late 1920s) ==
By the late 1920s, Jadvyga had returned to public service, becoming one of the most socially-involved women of interwar Kaunas:

- From 1927 to 1929, she edited Tautininku balsas, which completely supported her brother-in-law President Smetona's positions.
- In 1928, she became the long-serving president of the Lithuanian Union of Mothers and Children, which united 23 charities. An important project of the organization was the founding of the "Mother and Child Museum" in Kaunas, Laisvės al. Establishment of 12 (now 24) in 1932. The museum became an accessible educational institution for hygiene and the health of infants and children. Lectures were held and films against the then deadly venereal diseases were shown.
- On February 17 1929, she, together with other well-known Lithuanian public figures Ona Mašiotienė, Birutė Novickienė, Sofia Čiurlionienė, Paulina Karvelienė (Kalvaityte), and Bronislava Biržiškienė, founded the Lithuanian Women's Council. The organization, uniting seventeen Lithuanian women's associations, strove to educate women, to encourage them to become interested in culture, to develop their sense of responsibility (to society, family and state) and worked to protect their interests.
- Jadvyga was head of the ‘Milk Drop Society’, which organized events for charity.
- On February 16 1938, Jadvyga was awarded the Order of the Lithuanian Grand Duke Gediminas by the order of the Minister of the Interior, given for many years of social activity.
- In October 1939, after Lithuania regained Vilnius, Jadvyga became the chairperson of the Women's Section and Co-ordination Committee of the Red Cross in the Vilnius region.
- Jadvyga was active in the Vilnius Management Union.

=== Ousting of Voldemaras (1929) ===
Jadvyga sometimes took an even more active role in politics: it was thanks to Jadvyga that Augustinas Voldemaras was ousted from his position as Prime Minister in 1929.

Voldemaras had become intensely involved with Geležinis Vilkas (en: Iron Wolf), which attracted adherents among the younger nationalist officers, who were favourably impressed by emerging fascism, and who were displeased with what they perceived as Antanas Smetona's more moderate course. By 1929, Geležinis Vilkas had gained control of the army and were trying to push Lithuania toward fascism. Jadvyga, according to a New York Times article dated October 2, 1929:

"…smashed the Iron Wolf Society…She intrigued, agitated, and conspired, and managed to pry many of the older generals loose from their fascist ties. Then she won over the rank and file of the army."

In another New York Times article dated September 28, 1929, it was noted that Jadvyga:

"…inspired the anti-Voldemaras group in the cabinet and in the army and actually herself organized and personally conducted the coup which resulted in the change of government… She sought out first the more important senior Army officers and won them over to the anti-Voldemaras movement. Then she visited every garrison town in Lithuania, winning over converts and planning every move of the projected coup."

On September 19, 1929, while attending a meeting of the League of Nations in Geneva, Voldemaras was ousted in a coup by President Smetona. Smetona appointed his brother-in-law (Jadvyga's husband) Juozas Tūbelis to the Prime Ministership. Tūbelis was in a sanatorium at the time in Switzerland. He “emerged from the sanatorium to learn that Voldemaras was out of office and that he, Tūbelis, was Premier.” The New York Times wrote, in the September 28 article, that Jadvyga:

"…is considered the chief influence in the elevation of her husband, Jonas Tubelis, former minister of finance, to the premiership."

The reporter went on to note that:

"There is, therefore, no doubt in the popular mind as to who is the real ruler of Lithuania."

=== 1934–1937 ===
In 1934, Jadvyga was elected to the Kaunas City Council and remained a member until the Soviet occupation.

In the period 1934–1937, Jadvyga often traveled to Geneva, where she represented Lithuania in the Save the Children organization of the League of Nations. Before returning home, she usually stopped in Paris to visit Petras Klimas, the Lithuanian representative in France, and his wife Bronislava Klimienė. When Jadvyga arrived in Paris, the Lithuanian embassy was filled with flowers sent by her fans: mostly French senators and other senior officials. However, Jadvyga's biggest admirer was the American Ambassador William Bullitt.

In April 1936, Bullitt came to Lithuania to visit Jadvyga. She, along with her daughter, took him to see Pažaislis Monastery. On April 26 1936, Bullitt visited the Presidential Palace in Kaunas and signed the guest book.

== Soviet occupation ==
=== Fleeing Lithuania (1940) ===
After the departure of Antanas Smetona and Sofija Smetonienė from Lithuania, on June 15, 1940, Jadvyga initially wanted to stay in the country. In her opinion, as a widow and not holding public office, she wouldn't be of interest to the Soviets. Besides, she said, she had lived with Russians all her life, she wasn't afraid of Russians.

On the evening of June 16, Tūbelis’ former driver, well aware of the imminent danger, tried to persuade Jadvyga to flee Lithuania as soon as possible. Jadvyga resisted. If you don't want to save yourself, he argued, then save your daughter. Finally convinced, Jadvyga rushed to the German Embassy in Kaunas the next morning and received a diplomatic visa from the envoy, Erich Zechlin, with no date for her return to Lithuania.

Jadvyga packed as though she were going for a long weekend at the beach. In her luggage was a large terrycloth robe, a few summer dresses, a sweater, and two pairs of shoes. Juozas Tūbelis’ old secretary, Vytautas Einoris, who was in tears, grabbed a few small valuables and stuffed them into Jadvyga's luggage. One of the items was a Fabergé cigarette case – red and yellow gold with a sapphire clasp. Per the inscription, it was given to Juozas Tūbelis by his cabinet ministers in 1929.

With the necessary documents and two small suitcases, Jadvyga and Marija boarded the train to Berlin on June 17, 1940, and crossed the border of Lithuania without being detained. As it turned out, there was a real need for haste, as Jadvyga and her daughter were on the NKVD's list of persons to be liquidated. Jadvyga would never return to Lithuania.

=== Germany ===
Through the Lithuanian Embassy in Berlin, they learned that President Smetona and his family were staying at a hunting lodge near the Święcajty (pl) (Schwenzait) lake in the Masurian Lake District. Jadvyga and her daughter joined the Smetonas there.

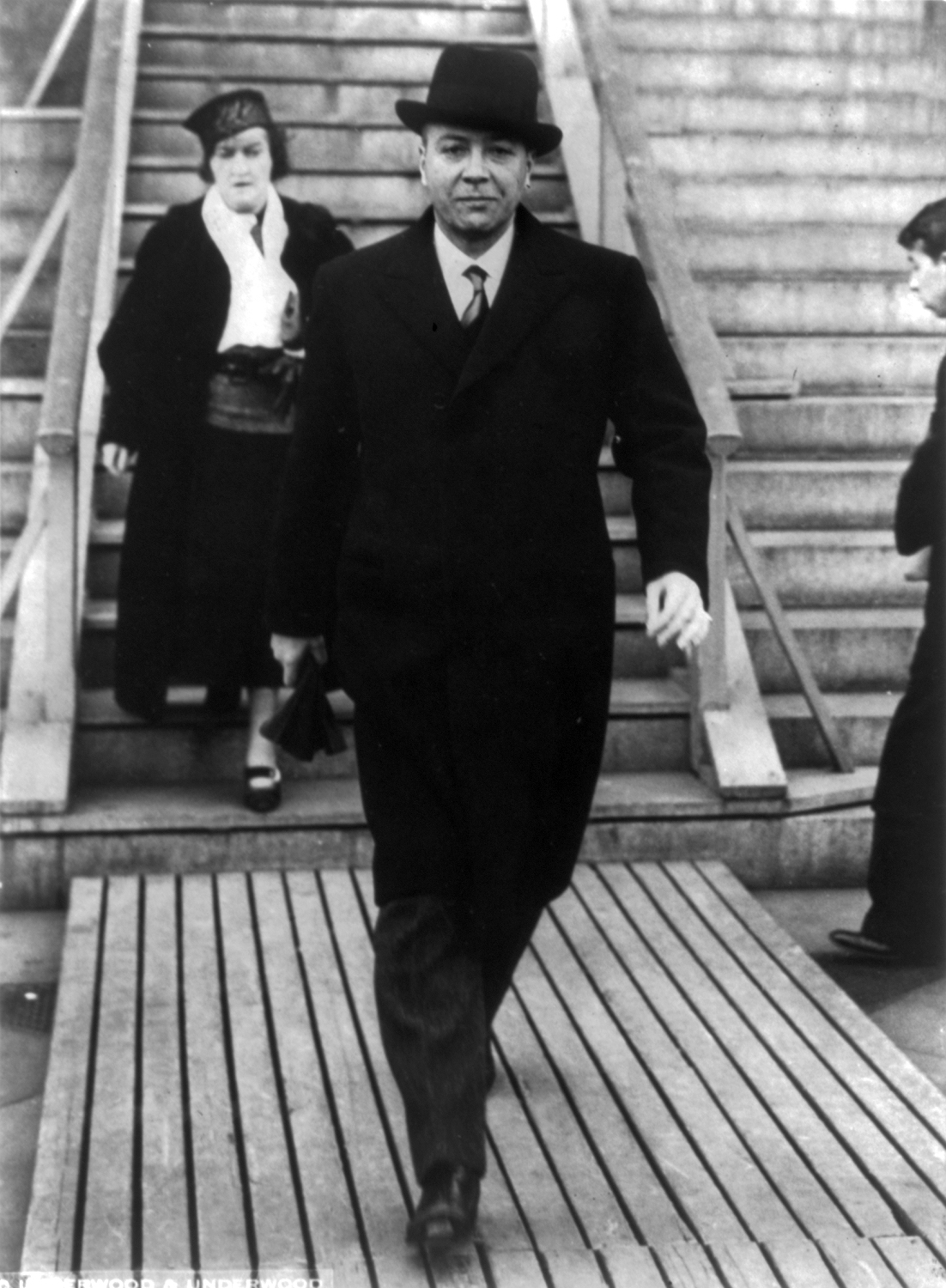
William Christian Bullitt

When the Smetonas returned to Berlin, Jadvyga and Marija followed. At the German Foreign Ministry, Jadvyga met a former secretary of Voldemaras, Dr. Bleš (Blesch), known since the Lithuanian delegation at the Paris Peace Conference. She helped Jadvyga find an apartment and promised to help her find work. However, Jadvyga decided not to stay in Germany. After learning that her friend, US Ambassador William Christian Bullitt (1891–1967), was working in Paris, Jadvyga decided to seek his help. Thanks to Bullitt, Jadvyga got a US visa.

=== Berlin to the US (1940) ===
Jadvyga and Marija flew from Berlin to Madrid, Spain (via Frankfurt am Main, Lyon, Barcelona and Madrid) and then took a train to Lisbon, Portugal where they spent several months, as there were no ships to the USA. Lisbon was overcrowded with refugees trying to flee the war. According to Hypatia Yčas, who was there with her family at the same time as Jadvyga:

"All of Europe’s refugees were gathered together, it seemed to me - all of them, of every nationality."

Jadvyga and Marija finally managed to get passage on a ship bound for Argentina.

From Argentina, they sailed to New York City, USA.

== United States of America (1940–1988) ==
On arriving in the USA, Jadvyga quickly became involved in political activities. In December 1940, she traveled to US Lithuanian colonies to give speeches. In New York, her public speech was scheduled for December 6 at 8 p.m. at the Grand Paradise Hall (318 Grand St. Brooklyn, New York). Her speeches were often received with thunderous applause.

On March 10 1941, Jadvyga welcomed Antanas Smetona and her sister Sofija to the USA. A few days later, on March 13, Jadvyga attended the reception of Smetona's arrival in the United States at The Pierre Hotel in New York. She and her daughter sat in seats reserved for the most distinguished guests.

In September 1941, Jadvyga and Marija lived in Cleveland with an American who had visited Lithuania five years previously. When she had learned about Jadvyga, she invited her to stay with her. Jadvyga tried to learn English. She continued traveling in the USA giving speeches. She also volunteered at the Cleveland Women's Easter Charity Fair.

Jadvyga and Marija eventually moved back to New York City. They lived very simply in the poorer neighbourhoods of the city. Jadvyga first taught Russian at the Berlitz Language School in New York, probably starting in 1943. It was difficult for her at the beginning because of heavy competition. She started with only a few lessons per week, but soon had more than she could handle.

One of her colleagues at the Berlitz Language School was an elderly, poorly-dressed lady, who taught Russian without knowing it well. Jadvyga offered to help her with her pronunciation. Later, Jadvyga discovered that this ‘poor old lady’ was Katharine Fowler Milbank (1885-1967), wife of Dunlevy Milbank, one of the wealthiest and most powerful men in New York. Katharine and Jadvyga became good friends. In 1947, Jadvyga moved from her apartment in Brooklyn, to 1771 Church Street NW Washington DC. Thanks to the help of William Bullitt, in the 1950s, Jadvyga became a Russian language instructor at what was then called the Naval Intelligence School in Washington DC. This was a secure government job, with regular hours, good benefits, and good pay. She was there for many years. She later lived in Apartment #102 at 2901 S Street SE, Washington, DC.

Again, thanks to her friendship with William Bullitt, Jadvyga got US citizenship for her and her daughter on May 2, 1950, at a time when the US was limiting immigration. On April 19 1956, Jadvyga was registered as living at 1235 East 80th, Cleveland, Ohio.

Jadvyga remained active in the Lithuanian émigré community and had close contacts with Lithuanian diplomats residing abroad, including Vincenta Lozoraitienė, Bronislava Mėginaitė-Klimienė (wife of Petras Klimas), Stasys Lozoraitis, and Petras Klimas jr. (son of Petras Klimas).

Jadvyga traveled to Rome every year, where she lived with Stasys Lozoraitis and Vincenta Lozoraitienė at the Lithuanian Embassy in the Vatican. While visiting Paris, Jadvyga would stay with Olga Mohler-Picabia, wife of the famous French artist Francis Picabia, with whom she developed a close friendship.

In the 1960s or early 1970s, Jadvyga moved to Miami, Florida, where she rented a small cottage. She later moved to an apartment in Bal Harbour, Florida (just north of Miami), and by the early 1980s, she was living in St. Petersburg Beach, Florida in a residential/retirement hotel owned by a Lithuanian couple Jadvyga knew from Lithuania, the Karaičiuses. The Karaičiuses sold the property around 1982, at which point Jadvyga was infirmed and not able to live by herself. Though the Karaičiuses were also older, they took Jadvyga into their own house.

Jadvyga eventually ended up in Putnam, Connecticut, in the Nursing Home of the Immaculate Conception Spiritual Renewal Centre, operated by the nuns of a Lithuanian convent. Here, she spent the last years of her life.

Jadvyga died on October 4 1988, and was buried in the Convent Cemetery of the Congregation of the Immaculate Conception Sisters of Lithuanian Monks (Putnam Cemetery) in Connecticut.
