= Kazimierz Chodakowski =

Polish ice hockey player

- Born: 20 June 1929; Łódź, Poland
- Died: 21 October 2017 (aged 88)
- Position: Defenceman
- Played for: ŁKS Łódź
- National team: Poland
- Playing career: 1947–1972

Kazimierz Chodakowski (20 June 1929 – 21 October 2017) was a Polish ice hockey defenceman and Olympian. Chodakowski represented Poland at the 1952 Winter Olympics and 1956 Winter Olympics. He also played for ŁKS Łódź in the Polish Hockey League.
