= Tadas Chodakauskas =

Mayor of Panevėžys, Lithuania

Mayor of Panevėžys
- In office 1925–1940

Personal details
- Born: May 4, 1889
- Died: April 25, 1959 (aged 69)
- Education: St. Petersburg Imperial University and Pavel Military School

Military service
- Commands: Panevėžys County Military Commandant

Tadas Chodakauskas (May 4, 1889 – April 25, 1959) was the long-standing mayor of Panevėžys, Lithuania (1925–1940).

He was the brother of Romanas Chodakauskas (1883–1932), Sofija Smetonienė (1884–1968) and Jadvyga Tūbelienė (1891–1988). Chodakauskas was a member of the noble Chodakauskai family.

== Early life and education ==
Tadas Chodakauskas was born May 4, 1889, at Gavėnonių Estate to Antanas Chodakauskas (1850–1925) and Maria-Joanna Chodakowska (1852–1910).

He had one older brother, Romanas Chodakauskas (1883–1932) and two sisters, Sofija Smetonienė (1884–1968) and Jadvyga Tūbelienė (1891–1988).

He studied at St. Catherine gymnasium in St. Petersburg, graduating in 1907, and then at St. Petersburg Imperial University.

== Military service ==
On November 1, 1914, Chodakauskas was conscripted into the Russian Imperial Army and assigned to the Grodno Life Guards Hussar Regiment, a light cavalry regiment. After conscription, he studied at the Pavel Military School in Saint Petersburg. By 1917, he was serving as the commander of a company of the 171 Battalion.

In 1918, Chodakauskas returned to Lithuania and settled in Panevėžys. On December 8, 1918, he joined the newly established Lithuanian Army. On May 26, 1919, he was appointed an Officer for Special Affairs at the headquarters of the Ministry of National Defence, and a week later he became a member of Panevėžys and county military commandant, serving from 1919 to 1924.

On June 1, 1920, Chodakauskas was promoted to the rank of captain and then on October 11, 1920, he graduated from the upper courses for officers. On June 1, 1923, he was promoted to the rank of major and then, on January 23, 1924, he was appointed head of mobilization for the Panevėžys District.

On February 10, 1925, he was released from the army.

== Mayor of Panevėžys (1925–1940) ==
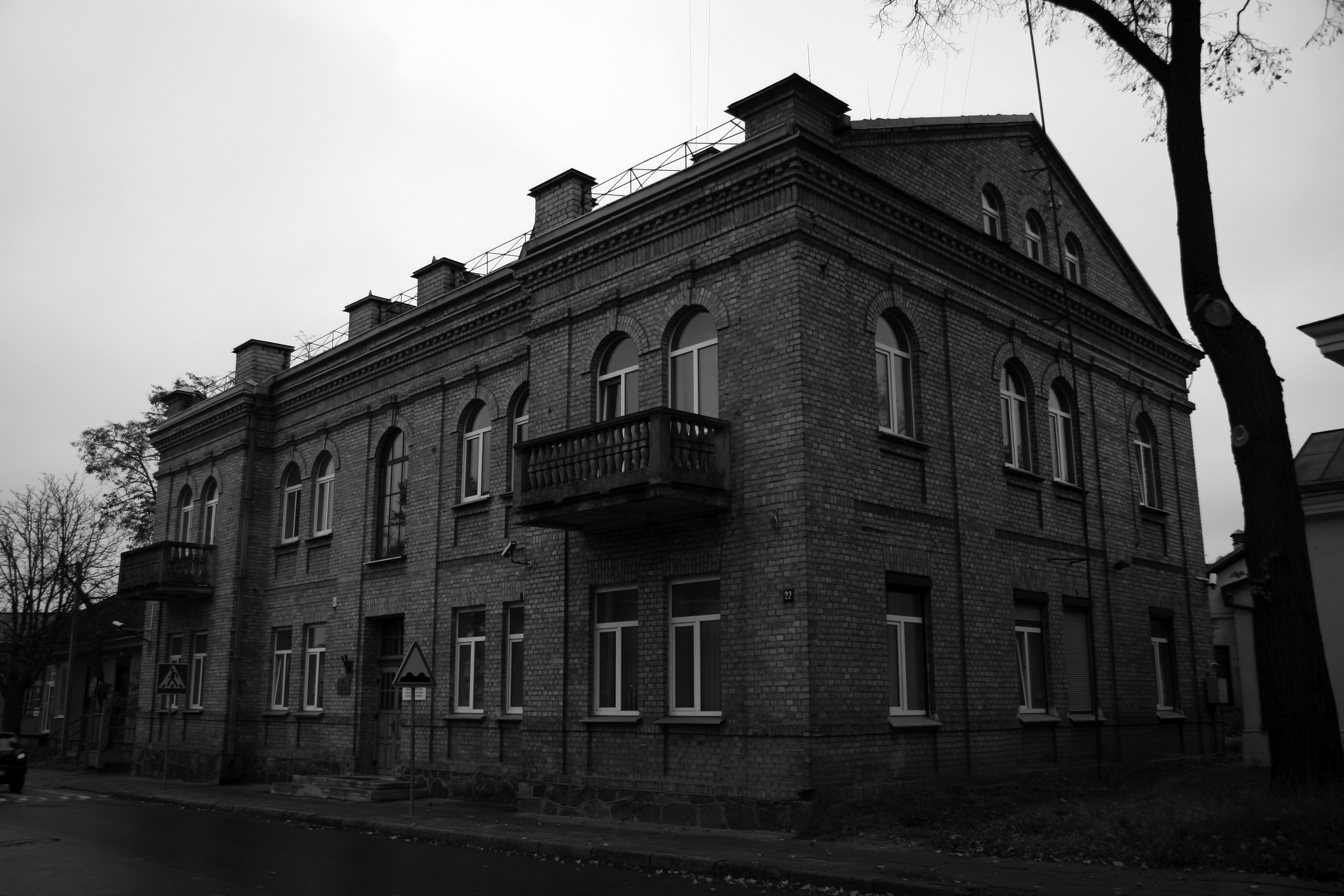
Chodakauskas' house in Panevėžys

In 1925, Chodakauskas was elected mayor of Panevėžys, a post he would hold until 1940.

During this time he was also a member of the board of the Panevėžys branch of the State Bank of Lithuania. On January 22, 1928, Chodakauskas was elected the chairman for the second board of the Panevėžys branch of the Union of the Founders Volunteers of the Lithuanian Army (Lithuanian: Lietuvos kariuomenės kūrėjų savanorių sąjunga or LKKSS). He held the position until 1936.

He lived in Panevėžys and bought Staniūnai Manor, a property on the outskirts of Panevėžys.In 1929, Chodakauskas built a villa in Berčiūnai, which was an alternative to Palanga for holidaymakers. His cousin Gabrielė Petkevičaitė-Bitė spent summers of 1936–1938 in Berčiūnai.

== Soviet occupation ==
After the Soviet occupation of Lithuania in 1940, Chodakauskas and his family drove from Panevėžys to the Masurian Lakes in Poland to join his sisters Sofija and Jadvyga and Antanas Smetona.

In June 1940, the Lithuanian Saugumas, the state security service now in the hands of the pro-Soviet regime, reported that people in the Panevėžys region of Lithuania welcomed the “fall of the Chodakauskas dynasty” that had so dominated local politics.

Chodakauskas and his family stayed with the Smetonas at the Hunters' Heights (Gästeheim Jägerhöhe) at the Schwenzait resort in the Masurian Lake District. The resort was located about four km from the city of Angerburg (Węgorzewo). When the Smetonas and Jadvyga left for Berlin on August 17, Chodakauskas and his family went to Danzig (now Gdańsk). There, Chodakauskas got a job as a manager of the German state farm Lebabrik. His wife, Jadvyga, and son Stanislavas were interred in a German refugee camp. As the Red Army approached, Jadvyga and Stanislavas managed to move west and eventually emigrate to the United States, while Chodakauskas remained in the city. Chodakauskas, however, was considered missing.

== Return to Lithuania ==
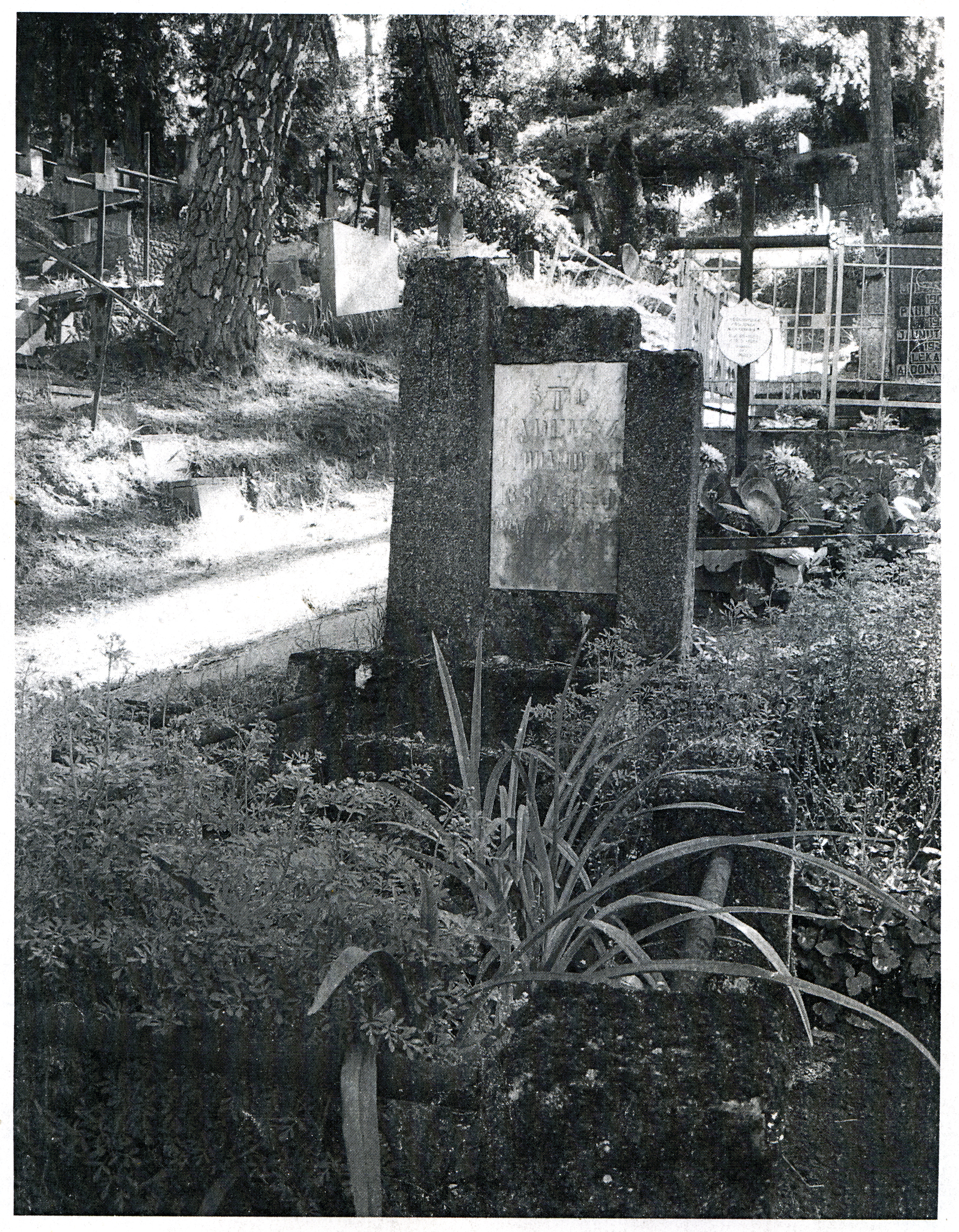
Tadas Chodakauskas' grave in Saulės Cemetery

Chodakauskas had obeyed a strict requirement of the Germans and fell into the Soviet occupation zone of Germany. After receiving fictitious documents in the name of Leonas Liutkevičius, he returned to Lithuania, settled in Čyčkai village, Vilkaviškis District and got a job with a farmer named Masaitis.

The priest of Lankeliškiai parish, Justinas Lelešius (partisan name Grafas) asked Chodakauskas to join the armed resistance movement.

On December 22, 1945, the NKGB (the Soviet state security agency from 1943 to 1946) arrested, interrogated and broke Chodakauskas. He became an NKGB agent (code name The Lion, personal file number: 15136). He was originally used as a prison cell agent in Marijampolė Prison.

On May 1, 1949, he participated in an MGB (the Soviet state security agency from 1946 to 1953) operation in Palanga. Undercover officers sent by the British Secret Intelligence Service MI6 and led by Jonas Deksnys, landed at Palanga at 2AM to assist with the anti-Soviet resistance. They included Deksnys, his wireless radio operator, Justas Briedis, Kazimieras Piplys, a Latvian named Vidvuds Sveics and two Estonians. Chodakauskas was introduced to them as the commander of Samogitian District and lured them into a trap. Deksnys, Sveics and Piplys managed to escape but the two Estonians and Bredis died in the shooting. This operation had a decisive influence on the destruction of the Bendras Demokratinio Pasipriešinimo Sąjūdis (BDPS) (en: ‘General Movement for Democratic Resistance’), which was trying to unite all anti-Soviet resistance forces in the Baltic states.

== Death and burial ==
On April 22, 1959, Chodakauskas died in Vilnius from a heart attack. He was buried at Saulės Cemetery on April 25, 1959.

== Awards and collections ==
Chodakauskas was awarded the Cross of Vytis (5th degree) in 1929 and the Order of the Lithuanian Grand Duke Gediminas (3rd class).

Some of Chodakauskas’ furniture is displayed at Panevėžis Museum and a section of the exhibit is devoted to him. Chodakauskas was an antiquarian and collector of objets d'arts.

== Personal life ==
Chodakauskas married Jadvyga Kosinskaitė-Velti (1899–1974) on February 15, 1922, in the Kėdainiai District. She had one son, Stanislavas (1920 – c. 1975), from a previous marriage. In 1929, Chodakauskas officially adopted Stanislavas. Kosinskaitė-Velti and Stanislavas emigrated to the United States where their descendants still live.
