= Chodakowski family =

Polish-Lithuanian noble family

Dołęga Coat of Arms

The Chodakowski family (Lithuanian: Chodakauskas) is a Polish-Lithuanian noble family. They originated in Mazovia in the Kingdom of Poland. The family was known to be in the Grand Duchy of Lithuania since the 16th century. They use the Dołęga Coat of Arms.

In the Polish-Lithuanian Commonwealth, there were two other noble families with the same surname of different Polish and Ruthenian origin. The Ruthenian one also used the Dołęga Coat of Arms.

== History ==
The family may have originated in Chodaków, a village near Sochaczew in central Poland.

The Chodakowski family can trace their ancestry back to Mikołaj Chodakowski (born c. 1510), who was granted Lichosielce Manor with a land property by Privilege on September 4, 1532, by the King of Poland and Grand Duke of Lithuania Sigismund I the Old.

In the Lithuanian Metrica, Mikołaj is mentioned as Vawkavysk's deputy mayor and local lord. He participated in the examination of some cases with other representatives of the court.

For the following five generations (1532-1807), the family remained in the Vawkavysk area of present-day Belarus.

On July 19, 1565, Jan Chodakowski, son of Mikołaj Chodakowski, the clerk of the Vawkavysk County Land Court of the Grand Duchy of Lithuania in 1565, sent two horsemen to the Grand Ducal Lithuanian Army and an additional one for Sigismund II Augustus.

In 1792, Jakub Chodakowski took part in the Battle of Mir in the war between the Polish-Lithuanian Commonwealth and Russia. After the 3rd Partition of the Polish-Lithuanian Commonwealth, he was appointed a judge of Grodno-Vawkavysk.

It was not until 1807, when Antoni Chodakowski (1784-1831) joined the 1st Light Cavalry Lancers Regiment of the Imperial Guard, that the family would eventually find itself in Vilnius, and later in northern Lithuania.

The family was confirmed as nobility on:

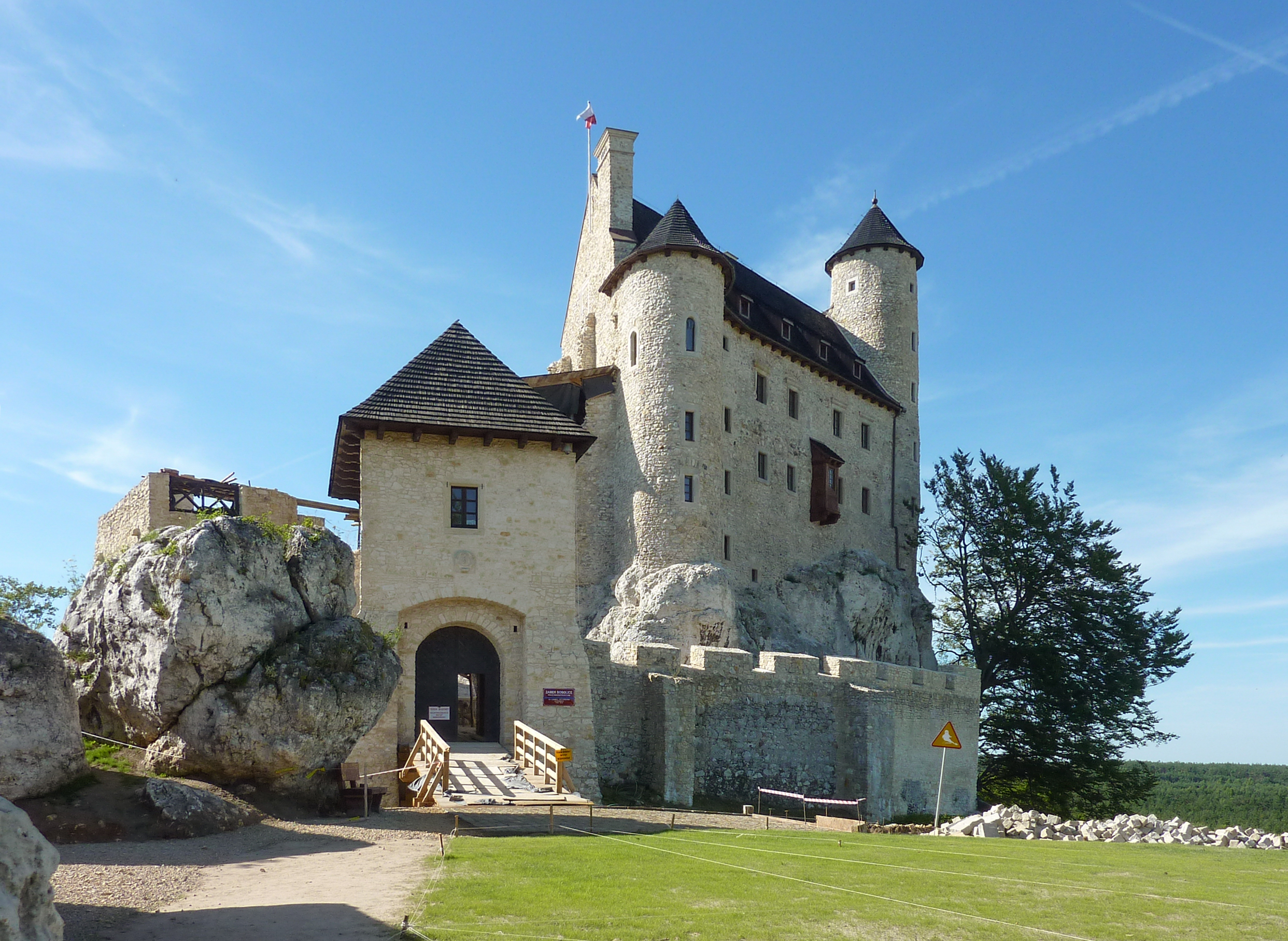
Bobolice Castle

- September 29, 1817 (Grodno Province)
- January 28, 1828 (Grodno Province)
- October 6, 1832 (Grodno Province)
- March 13, 1834 (Grodno Province)
- July 26, 1840
- July 5, 1844
- October 30, 1844
- 1882 (District of Panevėžys)

The Chodakowski family were instrumental in the creation and running of interwar Lithuania.

The family remained in the area of present-day Lithuania until World War II when many fled West to settle in the USA and Canada. Some branches of the family remained in Lithuania during the Communist occupation.

The family are now predominantly in Lithuania, Canada, and the United States.

One of the branches of the family once owned Bobolice Castle near Krakow, Poland.

== Notable members ==
- Antoni Chodakowski (1784-1831) Lieutenant in the 1st Light Cavalry Lancers Regiment of the Imperial Guard of Napoleon Bonaparte;
- Ludwik Mieczysław Chodakowski (1843-1914) Polish doctor of medicine;
- Romanas Chodakauskas (1883-1932) Colonel in the Lithuanian military court and military attaché to Berlin;
- Sofija Chodakauskaitė (1884-1968) First Lady of Lithuania, wife of the first President of Lithuania, Antanas Smetona (1874-1944);
- Tadas Chodakauskas (1889-1959) the long-standing mayor of Panevėžys, Lithuania (1925-1940);
- Jadvyga Chodakauskaitė (1891-1988) journalist, activist, Deputy Chief of Mission to Switzerland and the wife of Lithuanian Prime Minister Juozas Tūbelis (1882-1939).
