= Ludwik Mieczysław Chodakowski =

Polish surgeon and founder of the Likenai spa

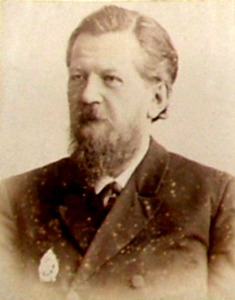
- Born: August 30, 1843; Telšiai, Samogitia
- Died: August 14, 1914 (aged 70); Vytartai, Skrebotiškis county
- Occupation: Surgeon
- Known for: Founder of the Likėnai spa

Ludwik Mieczysław Chodakowski (Lithuanian: Liudvikas Mečislovas Chodakauskas; 30 August 1843 – 14 August 1914) was a Polish–Lithuanian surgeon, doctor of medicine, and the founder of the now-destroyed spa in Likėnai.

== Biography ==
Chodakowski was born in Telšiai, Samogitia, into the Samogitian noble family of Chodakowski, bearing the Dołęga coat of arms. His family originated from Mazovia and had settled in Lithuania in the 16th century. He was the son of Aleksander Chodakowski and Natalia Sacken von Osten. After 1840 his father acquired the manor of Vytartai in the commune of Skrebotiškis, where the family settled. Ludwik was the second of six sons and also had a sister, Maria Joanna.

In 1864 he graduated from the gymnasium in Mitau. He then studied zoology and medicine at the University of Dorpat, earning his doctorate in medicine in 1871 with the dissertation Anatomische Untersuchungen über die Hautdrüsen einiger Säugethiere. In 1864 he joined the Polish student fraternity Konwent Polonia, and in 1871 obtained the rights of a filister (senior member).

After completing his studies he established a surgical practice in Biržai, which he maintained until his death. In 1890, on his initiative, the properties of the Smardonė spring in were investigated, leading to the establishment of the Likėnai spa. The resort developed quickly, but was destroyed by fire in 1891 and not rebuilt. Chodakowski worked at the spa until its destruction.

Between 1906 and 1912 he headed the Volunteer Firefighters' Society in Biržai. He died at the family estate in Vytartai, where he was buried.

== Personal life ==
Chodakowski married Józefa Maria Dalen, with whom he had a son, Aleksander Antoni. His wife died three months after the birth of their child.

== Bibliography ==
- Błaszczyk, Grzegorz (2021). Dorpatczycy. Polscy studenci na Uniwersytecie Dorpackim w latach 1802-1918 i ich dalsze losy. Vol. 1.
