= Sofija Smetonienė =

First Lady of Lithuania (1919–1920, 1926–1940)

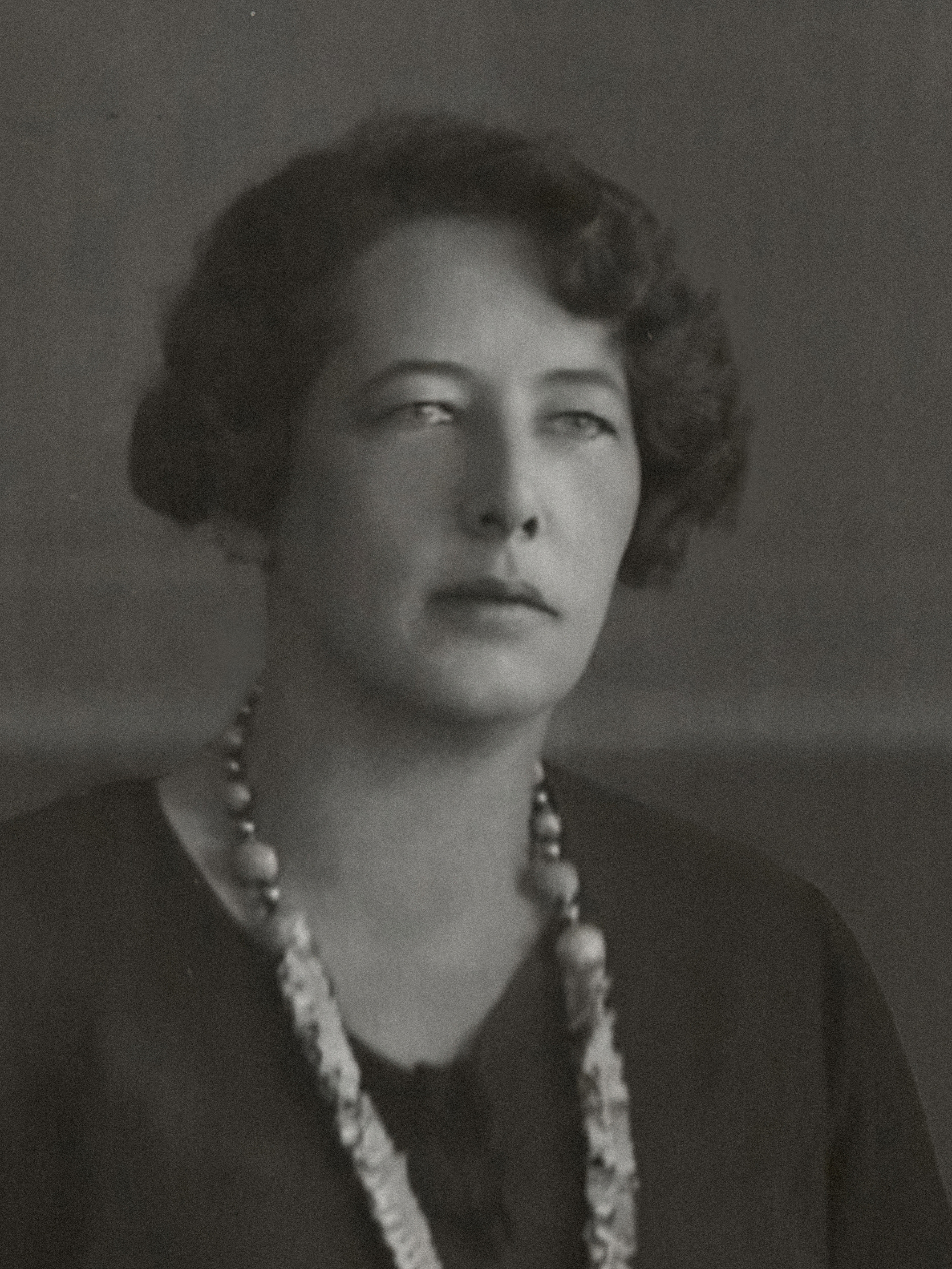

First Lady of Lithuania
- In office April 4, 1919 – June 19, 1920
- President: Antanas Smetona
- In office December 19, 1926 – June 15, 1940
- President: Antanas Smetona

Personal details
- Born: Sofija Chodakauskaitė; January 13, 1885 Gavėnonių Estate, Shavelsky Uyezd, Kovno Governorate, Russian Empire (now Šiauliai County, Lithuania)
- Died: December 28, 1968 (aged 83) Cleveland, Ohio, United States

Sofija Smetonienė (née Chodakauskaitė; January 13, 1885 – December 28, 1968), was the wife of the first President of Lithuania Antanas Smetona and served as the First Lady of Lithuania from April 4, 1919, to June 19, 1920, and again from December 19, 1926, to June 15, 1940. Sofija was a member of the Chodakowski noble family.

== Early life and education ==
Sofija Chodakauskaitė was born in Gavenoniai manor, the second child of Antanas Chodakauskas (1850-1925) and Maria-Joanna Chodakowska (1852-1910). She was baptized at Pasvitinys Church in February, 1885. Her cousin Gabrielė Petkevičaitė-Bitė was her godmother. Her uncle Stefan Chodakowski was her godfather. She had one older brother, Romanas Chodakauskas (1883-1932), one younger brother, Tadas Chodakauskas (1889-1959) and two sisters, Kazimiera (1882-1882) and Jadvyga Chodakauskaitė (1891-1988).

In 1895, Antanas Smetona came to Gavėnonių to tutor Sofija’s brother Romanas. Sofija studied at Jelgava Girl’s Gymnasium.

== Life in Vilnius (1904-1919) ==
On August 14, 1904, Sofija married Antanas Smetona in the Church of St. Raphael the Archangel in Vilnius. The couple moved to Vilnius, where Smetona worked in the Vilnius Land Bank. Sofija joined the local Lithuanian society, singing in choirs (led by Miko Petrauskas) and operettas, playing in amateur theatre productions, and actively participating in charity work. They first rented a three-room apartment in Rev. Juozas Stankevičius' house, but soon moved to a much more spacious and comfortable apartment in Antakalnis, at 13 Vilijos kranto gatvė, in front of Vileišis Palace - the home of Petras Vileišis. Sofija’s younger sister Jadvyga lived with them while she was attending school in Vilnius. The Smetona home became the meeting place in Vilnius for Lithuanian intellectuals. They discussed politics, played music and sang. According to Jadvyga, the home was a great centre of Lithuanian activity, Smetona’s house. Everybody came there, all kinds of parties. Sofija was also later involved in the Rūta Society.

On September 19, 1905, Sofija gave birth to her first child, Marija, in Gavėnonių manor. Marija was ill, so Sofija temporarily stayed with her. In order to save money, the family, together with Sofija's sister Jadvyga, moved out of their apartment in Antakalnis, to Smetona's friend Rev. Juozas Tumas-Vaižgantas’ apartment at 1 Tilto Street, Vilnius. The building also housed the editorial office of the Lithuanian newspaper Viltis, edited by Smetona. They lived there between 1907 and 1908. In 1910, Sofija's second daughter, Birutė, was born at Sebentiškis, Sofija's parents manor house. Both girls had poor health and Marija was taken to St. Petersburg for treatment. Sofija blamed their health on genetics, as her parents were first cousins. Birutė died as a child from brain inflammation. On February 17, 1913, Sofija gave birth to son Julius.

During World War I, Sofija joined the Lithuanian Mutual Aid Society of Vilnius, headed by her husband. She fundraised and distributed food to the war victims, invalids, wounded, and the homeless.. Speaking fluent German, she also assisted as an interpreter and mediator during the German occupation. About fifty refugees passed through the Smetona home during the war. Sofija also supported her husband in his political and public work during this time. She managed their home so Antanas could focus his free time on public work, publishing Lithuanian newspapers, and editing and translating books. On February 16, 1918, Antanas Smetona and nineteen other men gathered in his office (at Pilies Gatve 26, Vilnius, the House of Signatories) and signed the Act of Independence of Lithuania. Near the end of 1918, with the Germans retreating from the Eastern Front and the Soviet army approaching Vilnius, the Smetonas moved to Kaunas, Lithuania.

== Switzerland (January - November 1919) ==
On December 21, 1918, Smetona left for Germany to try to secure a loan for the country’s defence. He returned to Kaunas between January 1–14, 1919, and sent Sofija, with daughter Marija and son Julius to Switzerland. He then traveled through Scandinavia until March 1919, attempting to secure recognition for Lithuanian Independence. Arriving in Switzerland, Sofija immediately started working with her sister Jadvyga at the Lithuanian Information Bureau. She wrote the following to her husband: We have taken our work very seriously and we have a good reputation both in Swiss newspapers and in the public. Once Jadvyga left Bern for Paris (for the Paris Peace Talks) in July 1919, Sofija took over her work. In late autumn 1919, Marija was enrolled into a private girls’ boarding gymnasium Collège Sainte-Croix in Fribourg, Switzerland, where many Lithuanians were studying. Sofija lived with Julius in Lausanne while Marija was in school.

== Kaunas (1919-1926) ==
On April 4, 1919, the Council of Lithuania elected Sofija’s husband the First President of Lithuania. When Sofija returned to Kaunas in November 1919, she moved into the Presidential Palace with her husband. The Lithuanian Wars of Independence were ongoing, so Sofija spent a few hours every day at the military hospital, providing food, medicine and comfort to the injured soldiers. Smetona held the position of President until April 19, 1920. Not re-elected to the Seimas, from 1921 to 1924, Antanas Smetona edited several periodicals, including Lietuvos balsas, Lietuviškas balsas and Vairas. Between the years of 1923-1927, Antanas Smetona was assistant professor at the University of Lithuania in Kaunas - first in the Chair of Art Theory and History, and later at the Department of Philosophy. Smetona, Sofija, and Sofija’s father Antanas Chodakauskas (1850-1925) rented an apartment where the poet Reverend Maironis had previously lived: in the Syruć (Maironis) Mansion at Rotušės a. 13, Kaunas. Sofija continued to work in various community organizations, actively interacting with foreign diplomats and their wives, founding the Kuchi Society (en: Baby Rescue Society), becoming Honorary Chairwoman of The Lithuanian Women’s Union, and supporting a state-run nursery shelter. On February 4, 1925, Sofija’s’ father died in Kaunas. Because Sofija had cared for him when he was elderly, as was traditional in Lithuania, he left the bulk of his estate at Sebentiškis, 120.36 hectares, to Sofija. The family buried him next to his wife in Suostas Cemetery, northern Lithuania.

== The First Lady of Lithuania (1926-1940) ==
=== The 1926 coup d'etat ===
On December 17, 1926, a military coup d'état displaced the democratically elected President Kazys Grinius and reinstalled Sofija’s husband, Antanas Smetona, as President of Lithuania. Smetona would go on to rule the country for the rest of the interwar period. Sofija, as First Lady of Lithuania, soon became one of the most politically and socially engaged women in Kaunas.

During Smetona’s Presidency, Sofija’s liveliness, her ability to find common interests, to be friendly, and to enter into conversations of interest with foreigners impressed experienced American and German diplomats. The US consul in Kaunas 1924-25, Harry Carlson, characterized her positively:

"Madame Smetona is a highly educated woman of Polish origin, her family being reported as belonging to the Polish nobility. She is an extremely charming woman, and can easily be included among the three or four outstanding women of Lithuania at the present time. She takes great interest in her husband’s political work but is not openly interested in social work of any kind, and is not known to have taken or to be taking any special interest in education or welfare work. She is a brilliant conversationalist, but is somewhat inclined to be sharp and ironical in her remarks about persons and things. M-me Smetona is a passionate card player, and is known to play for rather heavy stakes."

Carlson’s replacement, Robert Heingartner wrote of her:

"Mrs. Smetona is a lady of unusual energy who dominates the President at home if not in office. In fact, she is sometimes facetiously called ‘The President.’"

The British affairs trustee in Kaunas, Mr. Preston, said that one of the reasons for President Smetona’s popularity was Sofija, who was “a serious aide to the President.” According to him, Smetona’s popularity is determined by:

"... his merits in the fight for Lithuania’s independence, as well as his intelligence, unwavering will, sense of tact, and sometimes his wife’s intrigue, who is often referred to as Lithuanian Catherine II."

Antanas Smetona was, according to daughter of former Finance Minister Martynas Yčas, Hypatia Yčas:

"… very approachable and quite unassuming, was a scholarly individual who liked to read the works of Plato and other Greek philosophers. He did not overawe any of us."

Sofija, in contrast, was more active, more powerful and harder than her husband. She often displayed a forthright and independent manner. If she had any problems with people, she could be harsh and sarcastic with her replies. As Yčas noted, Sofija was “an outspoken chatterbox” who, if she disliked somebody or something:

"… she would be sure to say so. It could be the food, the wine, the hairdos or the apparel of the hostess and/or the guests that she objected to. Some people found Mrs. Smetona’s cutting remarks hard to forget. For years, Mamma remembered her saying when they first met long ago in Vilnius, “You could be a good-looking woman, but WHY do you always wear low-heeled shoes?” An avid card player, she seemed to judge people on the basis of how good they were at playing Preference, an old but still popular game dating back to Russian Czarist times."

At the same time, Sofija connected with a diverse range of people and was known to have a “good humour”. Sofija was reported by many foreign diplomats as an outstanding and very influential figure, involved in many informal political affairs. British envoy to the Baltic States Hugh Montgomery-Knachbullo Hugesseno reports in London also said that the two sisters, the President and the Prime Minister’s wife, Sofija and Jadvyga, had a significant impact on the government.

John Gunther, a popular American journalist of the time, wrote in 1940:

"The president of the republic, Professor Smetona, is best known for his remarkable wife, who is a powerful personage in the affairs of the little state."

It was also evident to Owen J.C. Norem, the US envoy to Lithuania, who intended to include, in his memoirs of service in Lithuania pre-World War II, a few sentences about the very important role Sofija played. Smetona, after reading the envoy’s manuscript, was not particularly impressed with the statement that his wife, Sofija, had helped the President manage the country. He demanded that it be deleted from the book as it could lead to ambiguous interpretations. Sofija was also a heavy smoker, who smoked Russian cigarettes most of the time. The writer M. Vaitkus, having visited the Smetonas in Kaunas, wrote:

"I found Mrs. Sofija at home. Tall, slender. A rather pretty dark face. Eyes like a Mongolian. A bit of makeup below the eyes. In all a sharp, unusual face. Obviously good genes. In her right hand the lady often held a lit cigarette, from which her fingers had taken a yellow stain. But she often takes the cigarette to her mouth and draws deeply, so the corners of her lips are stained. She greeted me very simply, almost in a friendly fashion. We began to talk about life like old acquaintances. I asked, ‘Is Mr. Smetona home?’ She replied ‘yes’ and showed me where to go."

Sofija attended many official social events, frequented the opera and the Metropolis, and kept a close friendship with Lily Heingartner (the wife of Robert Heingartner the American consul) who regularly attended Sofija’s weekly bridge parties at the Presidential Palace.

=== Palanga ===
During most of the year, Sofija lived with her family at the Presidential Palace in Kaunas. When summer came, however, the family, like many residents of Kaunas who could afford it, summered in Palanga. The Smetonas would spend two months at their friend’s, Vladas Stašinskas, villa: Baltoji Villa. While there, the family was accompanied by their servants and advisors.

=== Užugiris ===
In 1934, to celebrate Antanas Smetona’s 60th birthday, a committee, made up mostly of Tautininkai, collected money and, as a gift, bought Užugiris Estate for Antanas and Sofija. Including pasture, meadow, and bog, it extended to some 80 hectares (almost 200 acres), of which half was arable.

Smetona had no time for farming, but after the house was completed in 1937, Sofija willingly took over the management. She spent about six months, from spring to late autumn, at Užugiris. One morning, when Smetona came to visit without warning, he discovered Sofija in farm clothes - she had been up all night tending to the birth of a litter of piglets.

=== Charity Causes ===
During the interwar period, Sofija was involved in charity causes; she was President of the baby-care society “Darželis”, she headed the Duchess Birutė Celebration Committee, was the treasurer for the construction of Vytautas Magnus Museum, was on the board of the committee to organize events for the 500th anniversary of Vytautas the Great’s death, was a patron for Kindergarten and Winter Help, and a funder of V. Kudirka School.

She also fulfilled her duties as First Lady by participating in official events, opening important buildings, and supporting women in sports.

== From Lithuania to the United States (1940–1941) ==
On June 15, 1940, Sofija fled Lithuania with her husband and family, ahead of the occupation by Soviet forces.

Via Königsberg, the family was moved by the German authorities to a hunting lodge (Gästenheim Jägerhöhe) near the Święcajty (pl) (Schwenzait) lake in the Masurian Lake District. On August 17, Smetona received permission to relocate to Berlin. The family then went to Switzerland, Portugal, Brazil and finally to the United States, where they landed in New York on March 9 or 10, 1941.

== Life in the United States (1941–1968) ==
The family moved to Pittsburgh and Chicago before finally settling in Cleveland, Ohio in May 1942 with Sofija’s son Julius’ family at 11596 Ablewhite Avenue.

On January 9, 1944, a fire broke out in the home, killing Antanas Smetona. A couple of years later, Sofija wrote:

“It was a terrible blow to us. I’m just starting to recover from that disaster.”

Understanding Sofija’s condition, close friends invited her for extended visits. For three months, she lived in a hotel owned by Juozas Bačiūnas in Florida. Then she went to Washington to stay with her sister, Jadvyga. She then returned to Cleveland, to live with her son, Julius at 1704 Lee Road, Cleveland Heights, US.

Because of the great divisions within the Lithuanian emigrant community, after Antanas' death, Sofija withdrew from public work, though she kept in contact with some members of the Lithuanian political community.

Sofija continued to live in the Cleveland area for the rest of her life, helping to raise her grandchildren and caring for the home. She didn’t socialize very much, but rather stayed at home taking care of the grandchildren, washing the dishes, doing the laundry, and patching and mending clothes. There were moments in her life, however, that took her back to happier times:

"When the wind blows as I sit in my yard, the corn stalks rustle the same as the reeds did along the riverbanks in Lithuania."

She always yearned to one day return to her homeland. She asked herself:

“Will that blessed hour ever come?”

In 1968, as she was preparing to attend the anniversary of her husband’s death, Sofija fell ill and was taken to St. Vincent Charity Medical Center.

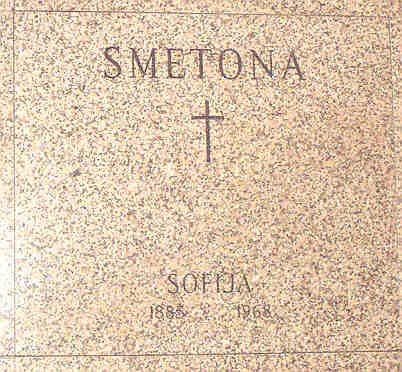
Sofija Smetonienė's Tomb

== Death ==
On December 28, 1968, at six in the evening, Sofija died. The funeral took place two days later. Sofija is buried in a crypt next to her husband (No. 103), in Section 23 of the All Souls Cemetery, Chardon, Geauga County, Ohio, (east of Cleveland).
