= Juozas Tūbelis =

Prime Minister of Lithuania (1882–1939)

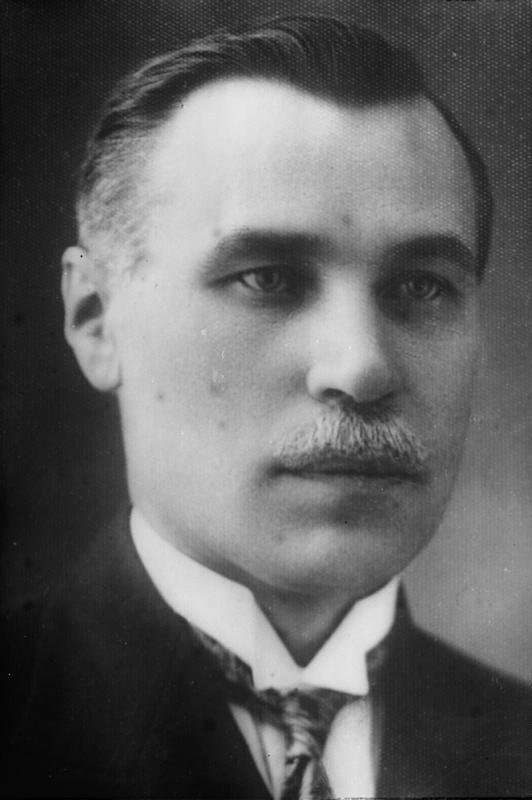

13th Prime Minister of Lithuania
- In office 23 September 1929 – 24 March 1938
- President: Antanas Smetona
- Preceded by: Augustinas Voldemaras
- Succeeded by: Vladas Mironas

Minister of Agriculture and State Property
- In office 11 November 1918 – 12 March 1919
- Succeeded by: Aleksandras Stulginskis
- Prime Minister: Augustinas Voldemaras; Mykolas Sleževičius

Minister of Education
- In office 12 April 1919 – 19 June 1920
- Preceded by: Jonas Yčas
- Succeeded by: Kazys Bizauskas

Minister of Finance
- In office September 1929 – 24 March 1938
- Prime Minister: Augustinas Voldemaras; Himself
- Preceded by: Petras Karvelis
- Succeeded by: Julius Indrišiūnas

Personal details
- Born: 9 April 1882 Ilgalaukis, Russian Empire
- Died: 30 September 1939 (aged 57) Kaunas, Lithuania
- Party: Party of National Progress; Lithuanian Nationalist Union
- Spouse: Jadvyga Chodakauskaitė - Tūbelienė
- Education: Riga Technical University

Juozas Tūbelis (9 April 1882 – 30 September 1939) was a Lithuanian politician, Prime Minister, and member and chairman of the Lithuanian Nationalists Union.

In 1908, he graduated from Polytechnical Institute in Riga receiving a diploma in agronomy. Not being able to find employment in his field, for another two years, he worked in Riga as a teacher, and then on land exploitation projects. In 1915, he was drafted to the Russian army. He was able to assist the Lithuanian Society for the Relief of War Sufferers, which helped out refugees and others suffering from war. He traveled across Russia, and in 1918, he returned to Lithuania, and worked for the Council of Lithuania at an education commission.

On 11 November 1918, Tūbelis became Minister of Agriculture and State Treasures. On 12 March 1919, he had to resign from the post, but became Minister of Education till 19 June 1920. From September 1929, he was Minister of Finance. He held this position until 24 March 1938. On 23 September 1929, he became the Prime Minister of Lithuania. He led three Minister Cabinets (the 14th, 15th and 16th) before resigning on 24 March 1938. Tūbelis was the longest standing Prime Minister of Lithuania. From March 1938 until 5 December 1938, he was Minister of Agriculture. He was also the Governor of the Bank of Lithuania in 1939.

Between political roles, Tūbelis helped to establish and direct large enterprises like Lietūkis (est. in 1923), Maistas (est. in 1925), and Pienocentras (est. in 1926).

After the coup d'état in 1926, his brother-in-law Antanas Smetona became the president. Since the two men agreed on political views, Tūbelis became the second most powerful man in Lithuania in the 1930s. He is credited with stable economy, national currency litas, and small foreign debt despite the Great Depression.

He was married to Jadvyga Tūbelienė.

Preceded by Augustinas Voldemaras	Prime Minister of Lithuania; 23 September 1929 – 12 June 1934	Succeeded by Vladas Mironas
