= Rasos Cemetery =

Cemetery in Vilnius, Lithuania

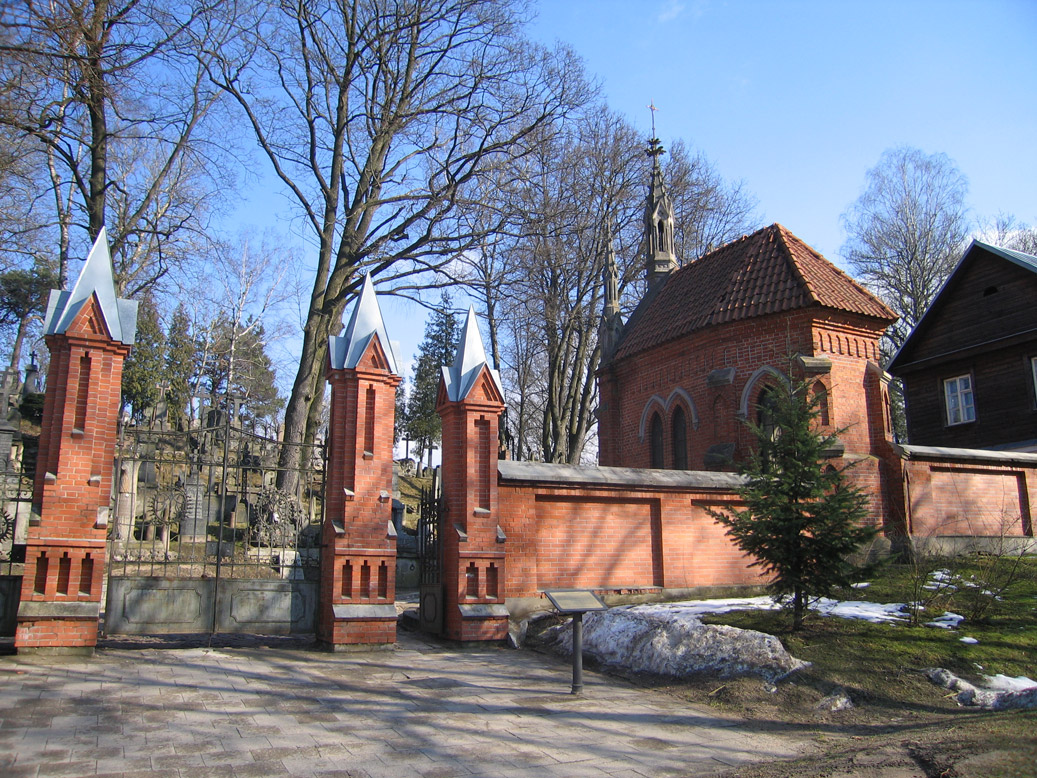
- Entrance to the cemetery.
- Interactive map of Rasos Cemetery

Details
- Established: 1769
- Location: Vilnius
- Country: Lithuania
- Coordinates: 54°40′06″N 25°18′16″E
- Type: Public (closed to new burials)
- Size: 10.8 hectares (27 acres)

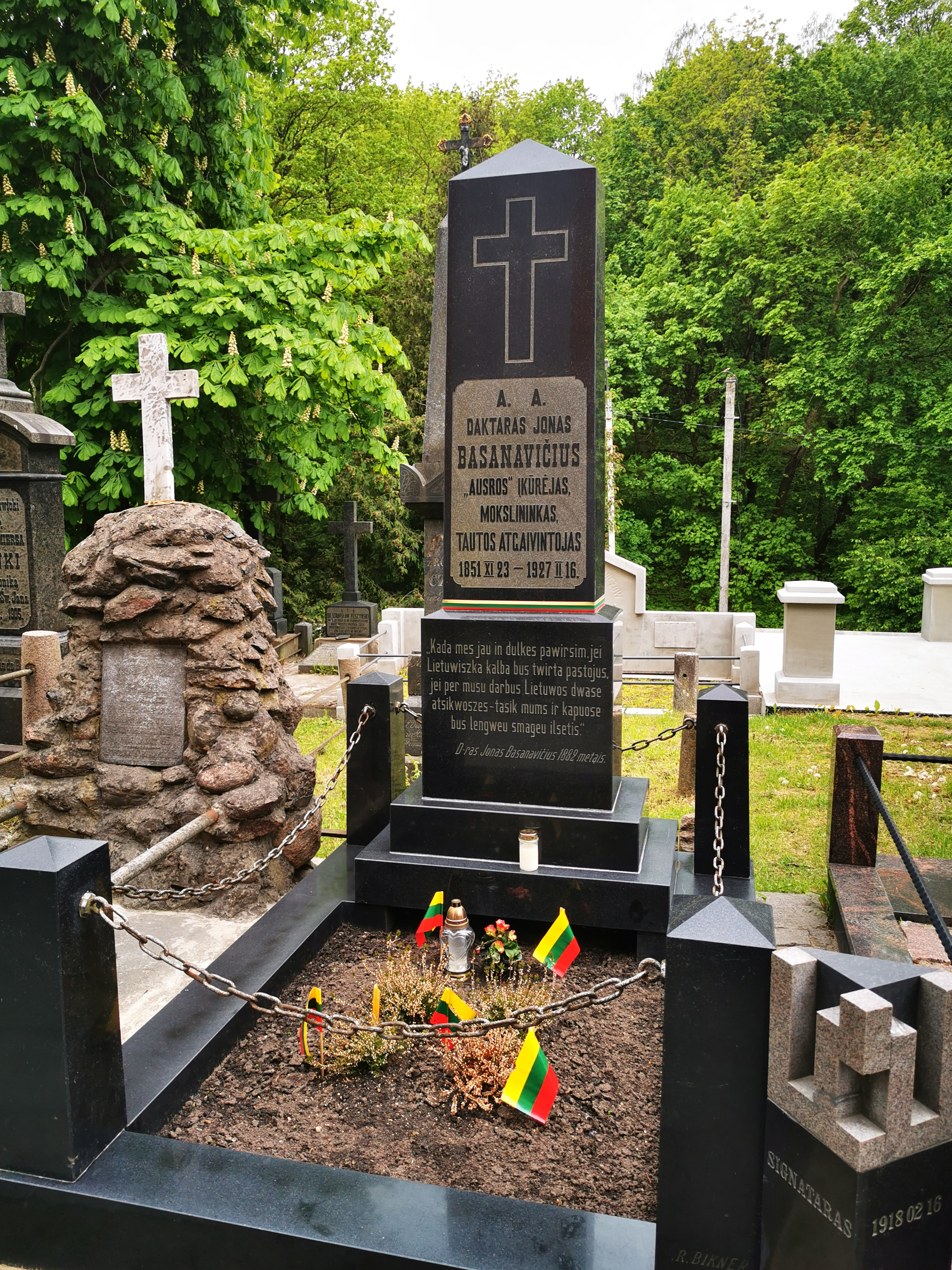
Tomb of Jonas Basanavičius

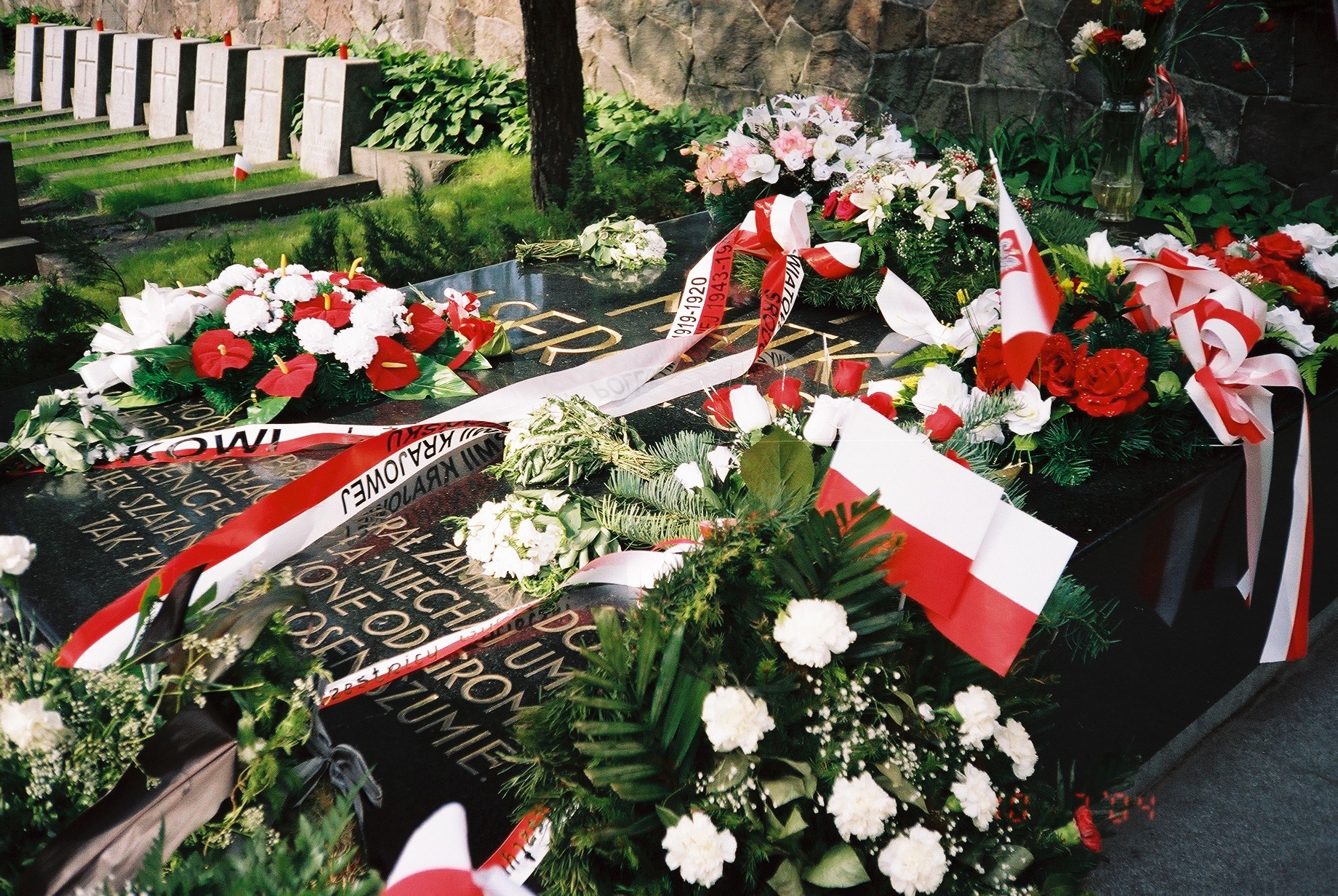
Grave of Jozef Piłsudski's mother. The huge black tombstone is inscribed: "Matka i serce syna" ("Mother and the Son’s Heart") and bears evocative lines from a poem by Słowacki.

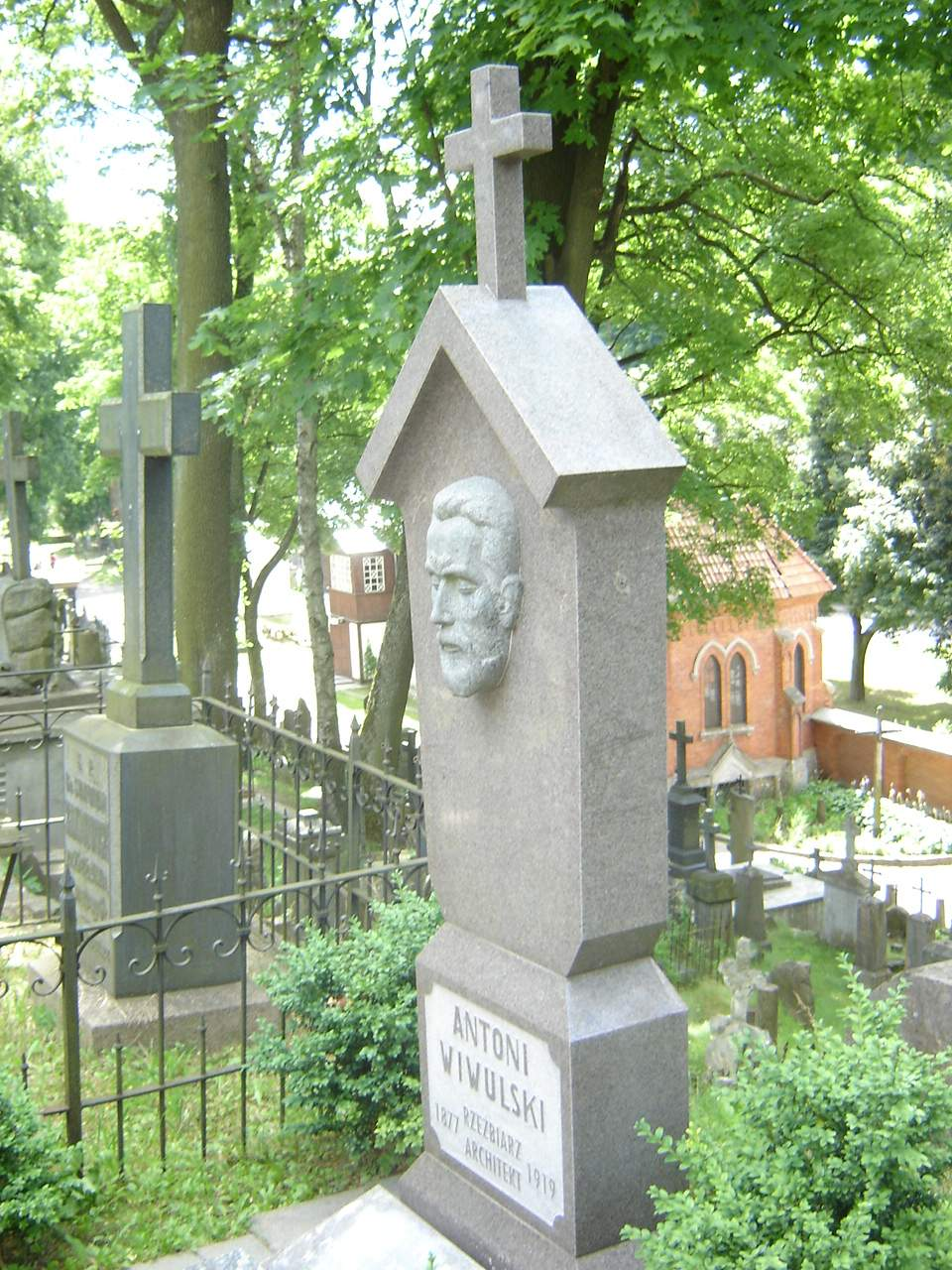
Tomb of Antoni Wiwulski in Rasos Cemetery

The Complex of Vilnius Old Cemetery, popularly known as the Rasos Cemetery (Lithuanian pronunciation: [raːsuː]; Lithuanian: Rasų kapinės, Polish: cmentarz Na Rossie, Belarusian: Могілкі Росы) is the oldest and most famous cemetery in the city of Vilnius, Lithuania. It is situated in the Ridge of Ribiškės, Rasos district and referred to after the latter. It is separated into two parts, the old and the new cemeteries, by a narrow Sukilėliai Street. The total area is 10.8 ha. Since 1990 new burials are allowed only to family graves.

== History ==
The year 1769 is cited in many sources as the date when the cemetery was founded. However, some historians believe it is a typo and the real date should be 1796. On April 24, 1801, the new cemetery was consecrated. Two days later Jan Müller, the Burgomaster of Vilnius, became the first person to be buried there. A formal document was signed in July 1801. It specified that the cemetery received 3.51 hectares (8.7 acres) of land and that the cemetery will be free of charge to all city residents. It was the first cemetery in Vilnius not located next to a church.

In 1802–1807 two columbariums were built. They reached up to five stories in height and were joined at a right angle. At the end of the 19th century the columbariums began deteriorating. In between the columbariums, a neo-Gothic red brick chapel was built in 1844–50. In 1888 a matching belltower was added to the chapel. At first the cemetery was surrounded by a wooden fence, but it burned down in 1812. A brick fence was rebuilt in 1820 and portions of it survive to this day.

In 1814 the cemetery was expanded as authorities bought additional land from a city resident. The addition is now known as the Hill of the Literati (Lithuanian: Literatų kalnelis). In 1847, members of the Eastern Orthodox church opened their own cemetery next to Rasos. It was used to bury soldiers from a nearby monastery hospital and poor city residents. Therefore, it became known as the Cemetery of Orphans (Lithuanian: Našlaičių kapinės).

After World War II, the Soviet authorities demolished the right columbarium and in the 1970s razed the left columbarium. The whole necropolis was to be destroyed in the 1980s as the Soviet authorities planned a major motorway to be built directly through the cemetery. Due to a press campaign led by the Polish-language Czerwony Sztandar (Red Banner) newspaper and economic difficulties, the destruction was halted. After Lithuanian independence (1990) and the collapse of the Soviet Union (1991), Lithuanian and Polish authorities collaborated in a restoration of the cemetery.

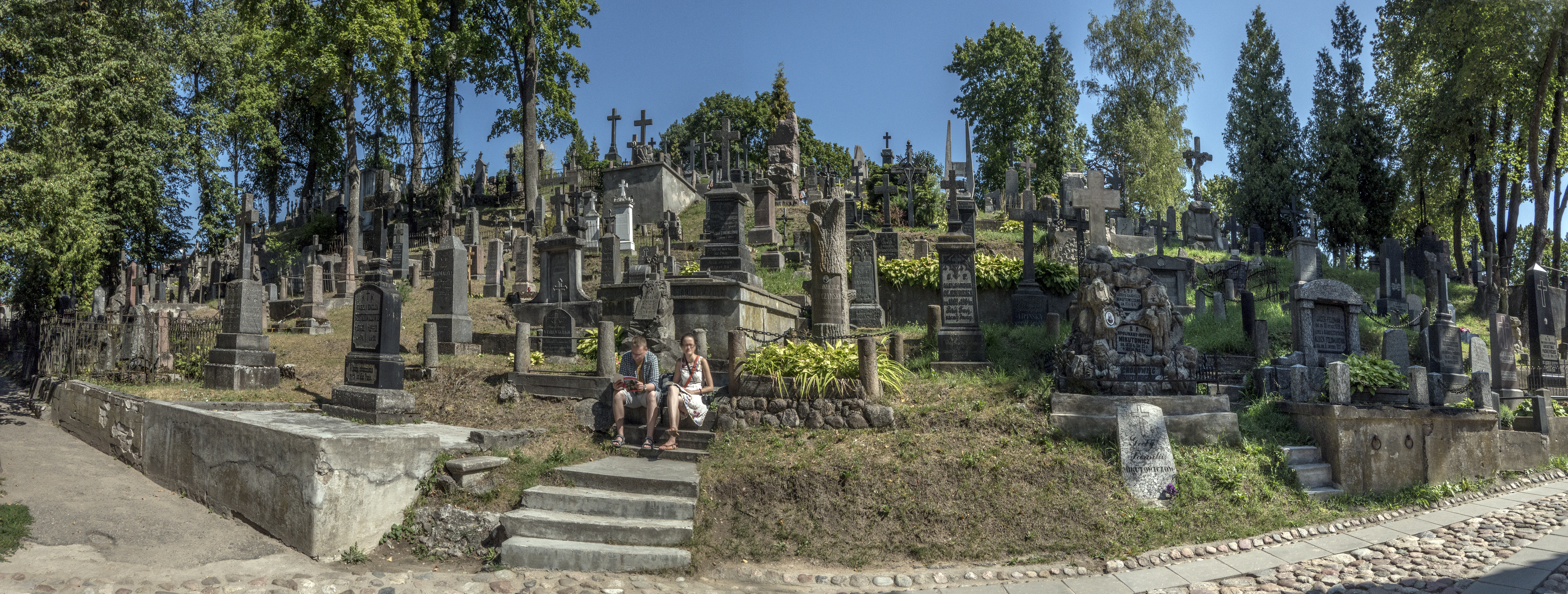
General view

== Polish war cemetery ==
In 1920 a war cemetery was built near the entrance for 164 Polish soldiers who fell in the city during the Polish–Soviet War and Polish–Lithuanian War. It was rebuilt in 1935–1936 by Wojciech Jastrzębowski, who also designed the tombstone where the heart of Józef Piłsudski is enshrined.

Until September 18, 1939, when the Red Army entered the city, an honorary guard of three soldiers stood there at all times. Three unknown soldiers who refused to give up their arms to the Soviets in 1939 were shot on the spot and are now buried next to Marshal Piłsudski's heart. Part of the cemetery contains graves of Polish Home Army soldiers, who fell during the Wilno Uprising. Their graves, demolished after World War II, were rebuilt by the funds of the Republic of Poland in 1993.

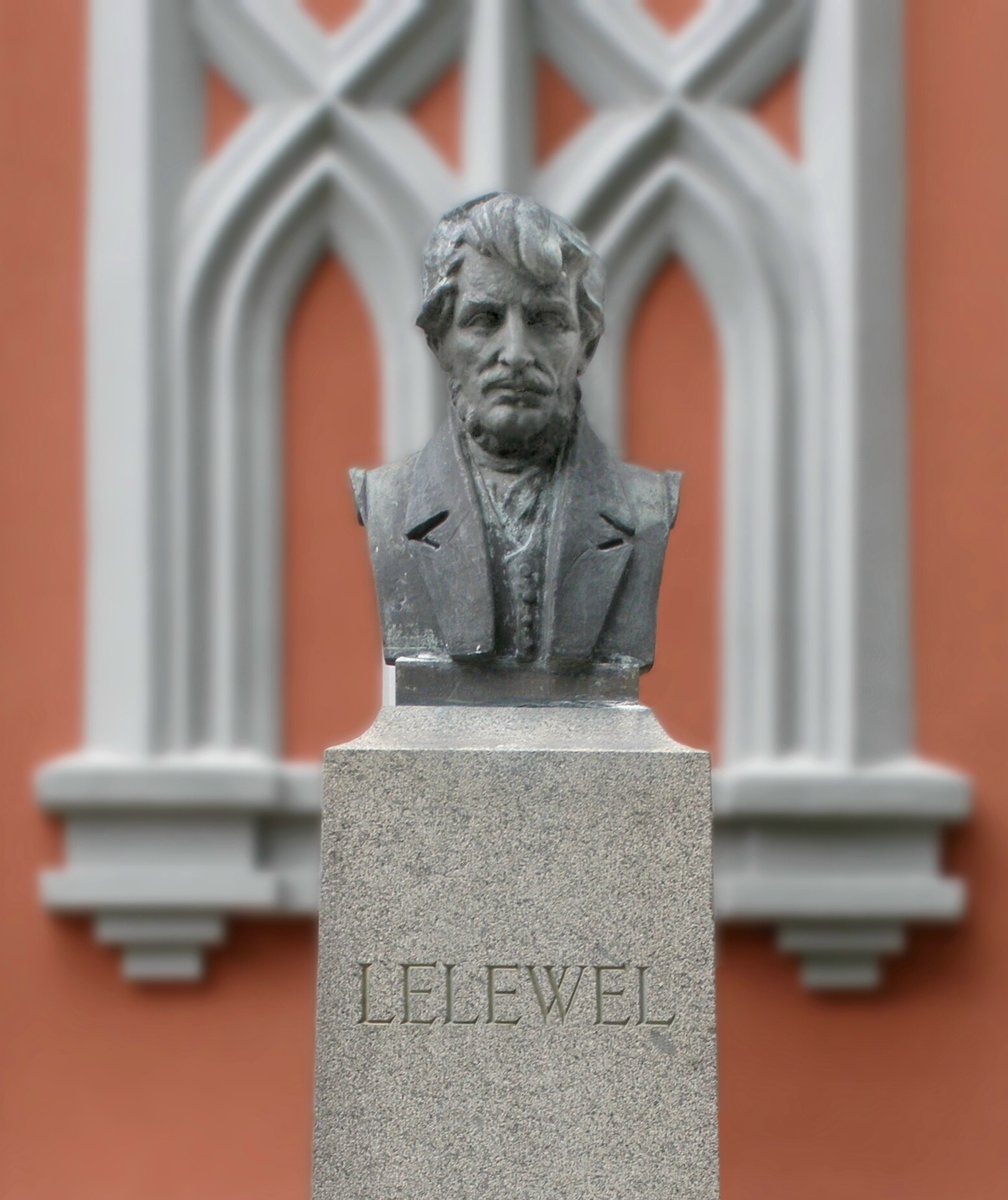
Tomb of Joachim Lelewel

== Notable interments ==
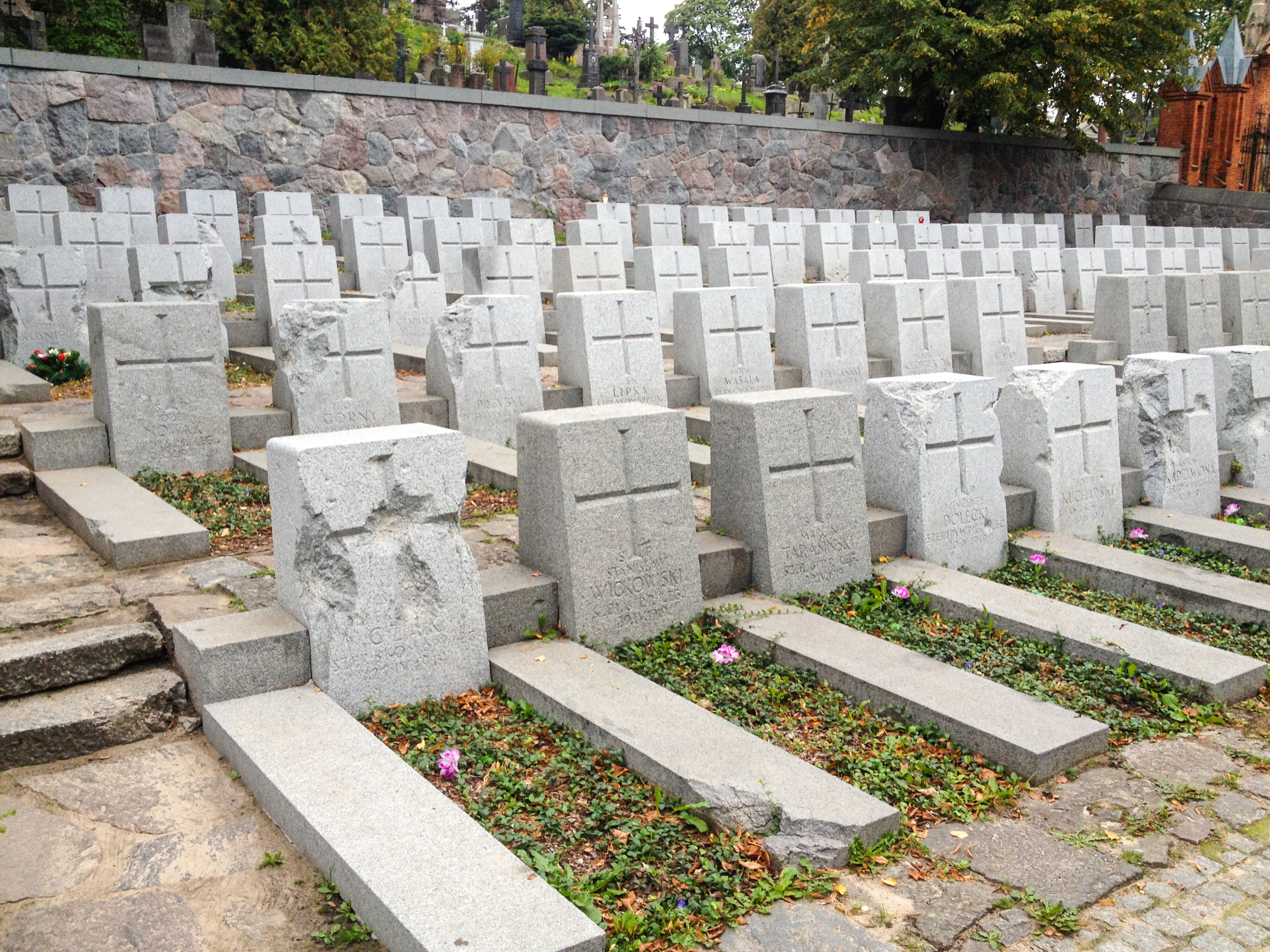
Rasos Cemetery

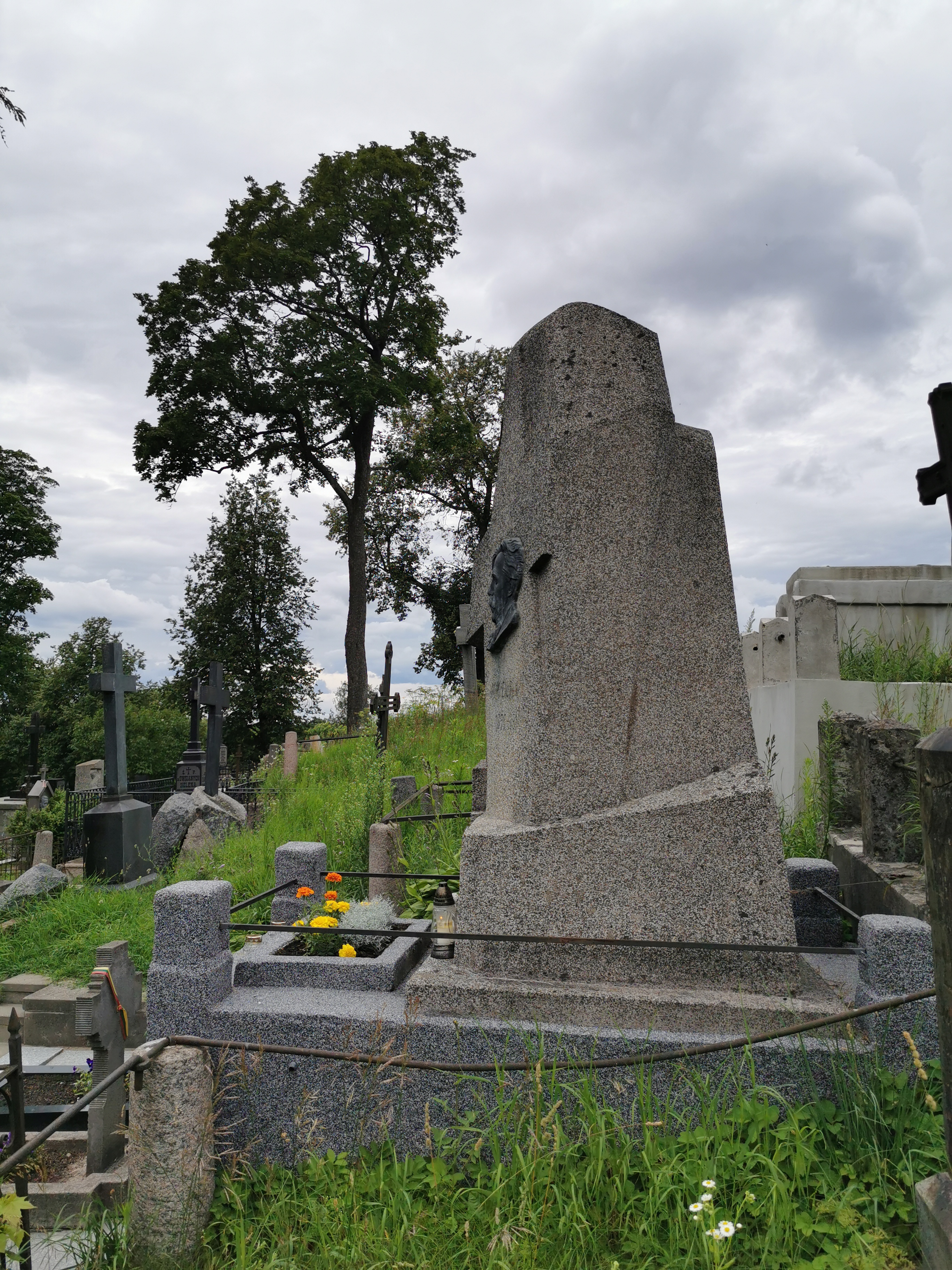
Tombstone of Mikalojus Konstantinas Čiurlionis

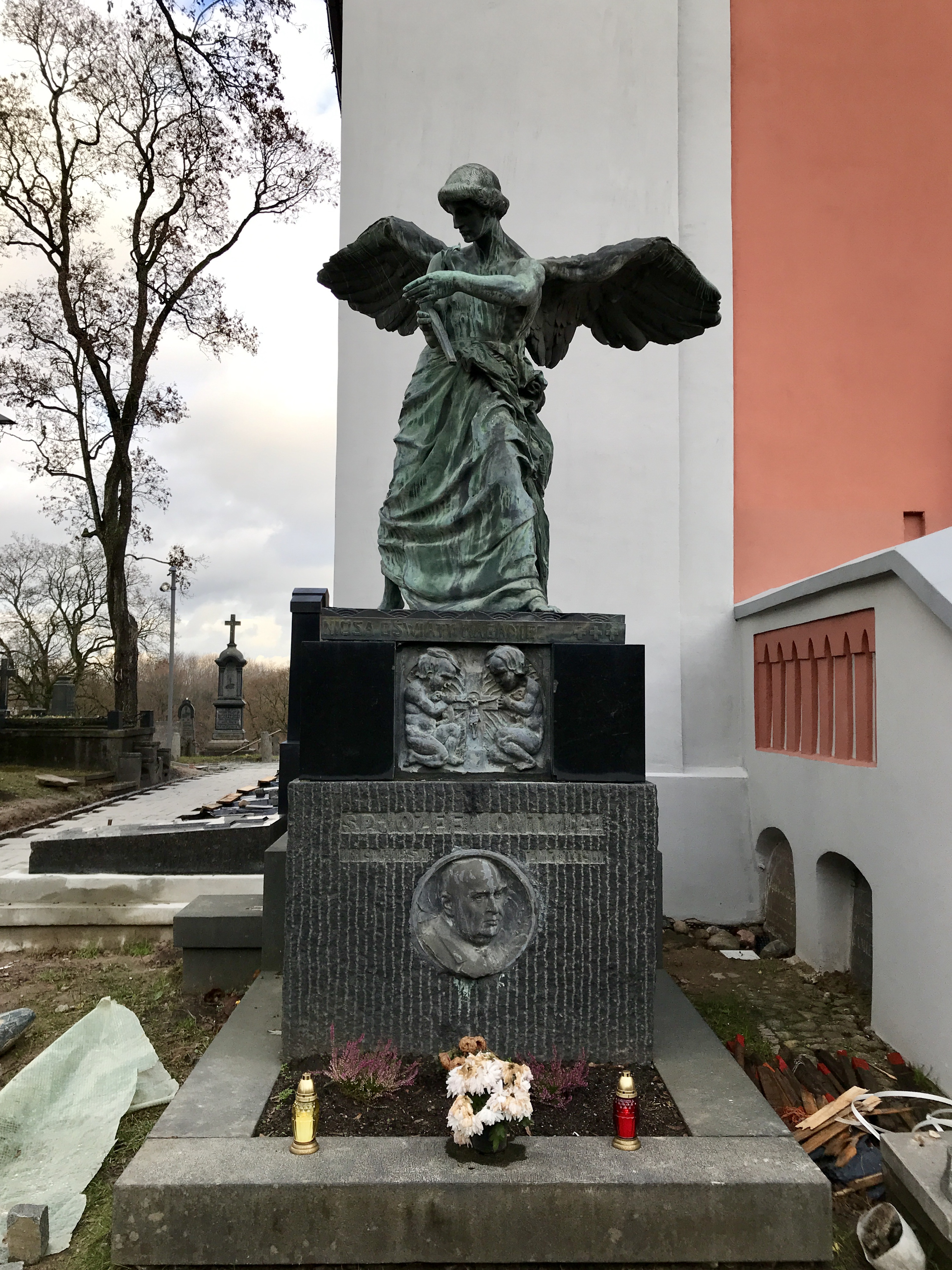
Tomb of Józef Montwiłł

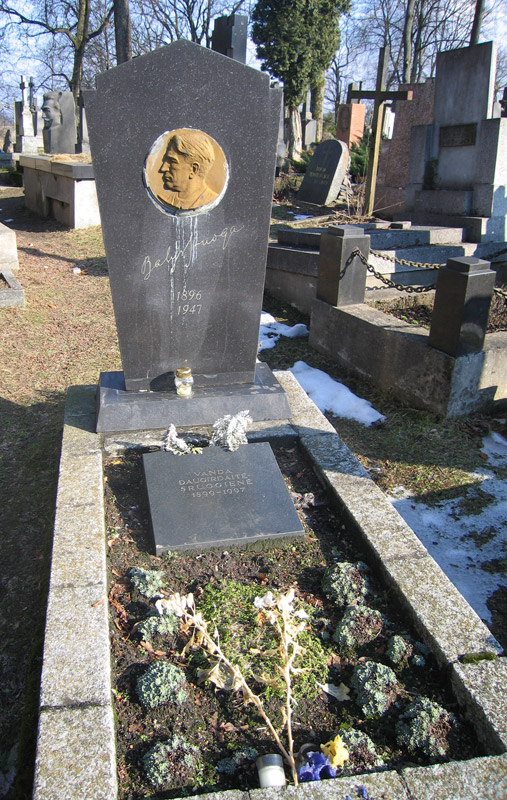
Tombstone of Balys Sruoga

There are many famous Lithuanians, Poles, and Belarusians buried there, including over fifty Vilnius University professors. Those interred there include:

- Vladas Abramavičius (1909–1965), Lithuanian cultural historian, poet, journalist, translator
- Adam Ferdynand Adamowicz (1802–1881), one of the pioneers of Polish veterinary, president of the Medical Society of Vilna
- Frantsishak Alyakhnovich (1883–1944), Belarusian writer, journalist
- Jonas Ambrozaitis (1856–1916), Lithuanian cultural figure, organizer of secret plays of then banned Lithuanian theater, Lithuanian book smuggler and distributor
- Juozapas Ambraziejus–Ambrozevičius (1855–1915), Lithuanian composer, poet, founder of Lithuanian orchestra in Šnipiškės Saint Raphael church in 1897, member of the secret society Twelve Apostles of Vilnius (1895–1904)
- Andrius Ašmantas (1906–1941), Lithuanian linguist, scholar, Lithuanian cultural activist of Lithuania Minor
- Bolesław Bałzukiewicz (1879–1935), Polish sculptor, professor at the Vilnius University
- Józef Bałzukiewicz (1867–1915), Polish painter
- Jonas Basanavičius (1851–1927), Lithuanian physician, scientist, patriot, activist, editor of Lithuanian newspaper Aušra, signer of the Act of Independence of Lithuania
- August Bécu (1771–1824), Polish physician, stepfather Juliusz Słowacki
- Jonas Bendorius (1889–1954), Lithuanian composer
- Cenotaph to Kazys Bizauskas, (1893–1941) Lithuanian statesman, diplomat, author, one of the twenty signatories of the Act of Independence of Lithuania
- Kazys Boruta (1905–1965), Lithuanian writer and poet
- Janina Burchardówna (1883–1924), Polish journalist, teacher
- Mikalojus Konstantinas Čiurlionis (1875–1911), Lithuanian painter, photographer and composer
- Petras Cvirka (1909–1947), Lithuanian writer
- Kristupas Čibiras (1888–1942), Lithuanian priest, cultural figure, political activist, active member of Lithuanian cultural and educational organization Lietuvių švietimo draugija "Rytas"
- Aleksander Dalewski (1827–1862), Polish political activist, founder of "Związek Bratni"
- Viktoras Dasys (1895–1944), Lithuanian cultural activist
- Rimantas Daugintis (1944–1990), famous Lithuanian sculptor; committed suicide by self-immolation protesting Soviet regime in Lithuania
- Borisas Dauguvietis (1885–1949), Lithuanian playwright, actor
- Mečislovas Davainis–Silvestraitis (1849–1919), Lithuanian journalist, poet, specialist in Lithuanian folklore, book smuggler, Lithuanian cultural activist
- Cenotaph to Pranas Dovydaitis (1886–1942), Lithuanian politician, teacher, encyclopedist, editor, professor, Signatory of the Act of Independence of Lithuania, Prime Minister of Lithuania
- Wacław Dziewulski (1882–1938), Polish physician, professor at Vilnius University
- Antonina Fiszer (1824–1840), Polish actress
- Liudas Gira (1884–1946), Lithuanian poet, writer, and literary critic
- Antoni Józef Gliński (1818–1865), Polish writer
- Antanas Gudaitis (1904–1989), Lithuanian painter
- Władysław Horodyjski, Polish philosopher, professor at Vilnius University
- Czesław Jankowski (1857–1929), Polish poet
- Ludwik Janowski (1878–1921), Polish cultural historian, professor
- Rapolas Jakimavičius (1893–1961), Lithuanian painter and sculptor
- Stasys Jasilionis (1892–1950), Lithuanian American poet, writer, cultural figure
- Wacław Jasiński (1881–1936), Polish pediatrician, professor at the University of Vilnius
- Jonas Jašmantas (1849–1906), Lithuanian cultural figure, founder of the Lithuanian and Samogitian Charitable Society in Saint Petersburg, member of the secret society Twelve Apostles of Vilnius
- Adam Jocher (1791–1860), Polish librarian, founder of the first public library in Vilnius
- Aleksandras Jurašaitis (1859–1915), Lithuanian photographer, one of the first Lithuanian filmmakers, founder of his own photographic studio ("Jurašaičio ateljė") on Gediminas Avenue of Vilnius (1902–1922), Lithuanian cultural activist
- Konstanty Kalinowski (1823–1864), Polish-Belarusian military commander of insurgents during the January Uprising
- Aldona Didžiulytė–Kazanavičienė (1892–1968), Lithuanian children's literature writer
- Vincas Kisarauskas (1934–1988), Lithuanian painter, graphic artist, scenographer. One of initiators of ex-librīs movement, one of the first Lithuanian artists, who popularized collage, assemblage, photomontage techniques
- Franciszka Kleczkowska (1827–1889), Polish educational activist
- Juliusz Kłos (1881–1933), Polish architect, author of the guidebook to Vilnius
- Felicjan Kochanowski (1831–1887), Polish priest, educational activist
- Kazys Kriščiukaitis (1870–1949), famous Lithuanian wood sculptor, author of wooden altars, restorer, establisher of his own workshop in Vilnius (1890)
- Kazimiera Kymantaitė (1909–1999), Lithuanian film and actress and stage director
- Jonas Kruopas (1908–1975), Lithuanian linguist, scholar
- Marcelė Kubiliūtė, the only Lithuanian woman awarded all major Lithuanian orders
- Antanas Kučas (1909–1989), Lithuanian graphic artist, book illustrator, professor
- Gabrielius Landsbergis–Žemkalnis (1852–1916), Lithuanian playwright, publicist, book distributor, administrator of Vilniaus žinios
- Sigitas Benjaminas Lasavickas (1925–1998), Lithuanian architect and theorist, architectural restorer, who contributed greatly to conservation and restoration of Vilnius castles, Trakai castles, Medininkai Castle
- Anton Lavicki aka Jadvihin Š. (1869–1922), Belarusian playwright, opinion journalist, specialist in literature, translator and poet
- Joachim Lelewel (1786–1861), Polish historian, professor at Vilnius University
- Cenotaph to Anton Luckievich (1884–1942), Belarusian politician, historian, cultural figure, head of Belarusian museum in Vilnius
- Ivan Luckievič (1881–1919), Belarusian cultural figure, bibliophile, collectionner, historian, archaeologist, whose collection was a base for Belarusian museum in Vilnius (established in 1921)
- Józef Łukaszewicz (1863–1928), Polish professor at Stefan Batory University and revolutionist
- Wacław Leon Makowski (1854–1929), Polish publisher
- Mikołaj Malinowski (Lithuanian: Mykolas Malinauskas) (1799–1865), Polish-Lithuanian historian, archaeologist
- Jonas Marcinkevičius (1900–1953), Lithuanian writer, journalist
- Alfonsas Mikulskis (1909–1983), Lithuanian composer, musical conductor, choirmaster of Lithuanian National Art Ensemble "Čiurlionis" in Cleveland
- Ona Mikulskienė (1905–2008), cultural figure of Lithuanian Americans, conductor of kanklės ensembles
- Cenotaph to Vladas Mironas (1880–1953), Lithuanian priest, cultural figure, politician, member of the Council of Lithuania, Signatory of the Act of Independence of Lithuania, Prime Minister of Lithuania.
- Józef Montwiłł (1850–1911), Polish humanist and sponsor of hospitals, orphanages and museums, sponsor of separate suburbs of houses in Vilnius (so-called colonies, most notable Lukiškės/Montvila colony near Lukiškės Square)
- Povilas Pakarklis (1902–1955), Lithuanian historian, professor of Vilnius University
- Augustinas Paškevičius (1844–1914), Lithuanian doctor, cultural figure, chairman (1909–14) of Lithuanian cultural Rūta Society of Vilnius
- Vincas Mykolaitis–Putinas (1893–1967), Lithuanian writer
- Jan O'Connor (1760–1802), physician, professor at Vilnius University
- Jerzy Orda (1905–1972), Polish historian, social activist
- Elena Žalinkevičaitė-Petrauskienė (1900–1986), famous Lithuanian actor, poet, playwright
- Kipras Petrauskas (1885–1968), Lithuanian tenor, founder of Lithuanian opera
- Mikas Petrauskas (1873–1937), Lithuanian composer, musical conductor, cultural figure, author of the first Lithuanian opera Birutė
- The heart of Józef Piłsudski (1867–1935), Polish statesman. Also his mother, two brothers, and first wife are buried at Rasos cemetery
- Onufry Pietraszkiewicz (1793–1863), Polish poet
- Maria Piłsudska (née Koplewska; 1865–1921), first wife of Józef Piłsudski
- Adam Piłsudski (1869–1935), Polish politician, vice-president of Vilna, brother of Józef Piłsudski
- Stasys Pinkus (1925–1992), Lithuanian art historian
- Karol Podczaszyński (Lithuanian: Karolis Podčašinskis) (1790–1860), Polish-Lithuanian architect, professor at Vilnius University
- Rafał Radziwiłłowicz (1860–1929) Polish psychiatrist, social activist, professor at the University of Stefan Batory, co-founder of the Society for Social Medicine, co-founder of the Polish Psychiatric Association (1920)
- Albinas Rimka (1886–1944), Lithuanian economist, publicist, journalist, politician, Finance minister (1926) of Interwar Lithuania, Kaunas and Vilnius university professor
- Ksaveras Sakalauskas–Vanagėlis (1863–1938), Lithuanian book distributor, poet, writer, contributor to Lithuanian newspaper Aušra, organizer of Lithuanian choruses and secret Lithuanian theater plays, chairman of Lithuanian culture society of Warsaw (1923–1934), cultural figure
- Zygmunt Sierakowski (1826–1863), a commander of the January Uprising
- Ludwik Sokołowski (1882–1936), Polish engineer, architect, professor at the University of Stefan Batory
- Marek Konrad Sokołowski (1818–1883), famous Polish, Ukrainian and Russian guitarist, composer, inventor of his own type of Harp guitar, generally known as "The king of guitarists", was awarded the diploma of "The first guitarist of Europe" in 1858 in Carltheater, Vienna, the first professional guitarist of Lithuania
- Euzebiusz Słowacki (1772–1814), Polish theorist and literary historian, father of Juliusz Słowacki
- Franciszek Smuglewicz (Lithuanian: Pranciškus Smuglevičius) (1745–1807), Polish-Lithuanian painter, professor at Vilnius University
- Balys Sruoga (1896–1947), Lithuanian writer and concentration camp survivor
- Povilas Snarskis (1889–1969), Lithuanian botanist, florist, professor of Vilnius University, author of books on Lithuanian flora
- Jędrzej Śniadecki (1768–1838), Polish physician, chemist, biologist, writer
- Wiktor Staniewicz (1866–1932), Polish mathematician, professor and rector of the Stefan Batory University in the years 1921–22
- Albin Stepovič (1894–1934), Belarusian writer, composer, musicologist, cultural figure
- Kanstancin Stepovič (Kazimir Svajak) (1890–1926), Belarusian priest, poet, musician, cultural activist
- Konstantinas Stašys (1843–1919), Lithuanian priest, cultural activist
- Władysław Syrokomla (1823–1862), Polish-Lithuanian writer
- Władysław Szachno (1838/40–1889), pianist, composer
- Marcelinas Šikšnys (1874–1970), Lithuanian mathematician, poet, writer, translator, playwright, participant in the banned press, author of the first legal Lithuanian theater performance "Pilėnų kunigaikštis" ("The Duke of Pilėnai") in the Town Hall of Vilnius (1906)
- Jurgis Šlapelis (1876–1941), Lithuanian linguist, translator, founder of the first Lithuanian bookstore in Vilnius, cultural and political figure
- Marija Šlapelienė (1880–1977), cultural figure, actor, active member of Lithuanian "Vilniaus aušra" society, cultural Rūta Society, founder of the first bookstore ("Marijos ir Jurgio Šlapelių lietuvių knygynas"), dedicated to Lithuanian language and literature in Vilnius (1906–1949)
- Juozas Tallat-Kelpša (1889–1949), Lithuanian composer
- Arūnas Tarabilda (1934–1969), Lithuanian graphic artist
- Juozas Tysliava (1902–1961), Lithuanian poet, translator, journalist, publisher
- Valerija Vaivadaitė-Tysliavienė (1914–1984), Lithuanian American cultural figure
- Eustachy Tyszkiewicz (1814–1873), Polish-Lithuanian historian, archaeologist
- Kazimieras Umbražiūnas (1909–1996), Lithuanian journalist, publicist, who wrote mostly about the region of Vilnius
- Raimondas Vabalas (1937–2001), Lithuanian film director
- Jonas Vabalas–Gudaitis (1881–1955), Lithuanian psychologist, professor at Vytautas Magnus University and Vilnius University, initiator of experimental psychology in Lithuania
- Petras Vaičiūnas (1890–1959), Lithuanian poet, translator, playwright
- Stasė Paulauskaitė-Vaineikienė (1884–1946), Lithuanian book smuggler and distributor, secret teacher (daractor), during Lithuanian press ban, writer, poet, cultural figure
- Jonas Vengris (1877–1935), Lithuanian mountain engineer, Lithuanian cultural activist, sponsor of Lithuanian charity organizations, school and policlinic in Vilnius
- Antanas Vileišis (1856–1919), Lithuanian physician, humanist and sponsor of cultural and charity organizations, Lithuanian schools, newspapers, Lithuanian political activist
- Jonas Vileišis (1872–1942), Lithuanian politician, mayor of Kaunas, signer of the Act of Independence of Lithuania
- Petras Vileišis (1851–1926), engineer, humanist and sponsor of cultural and charity organizations, Lithuanian schools, Vilniaus žinios and other newspapers, host of the Lithuanian art exhibitions in his Vileišis Palace
- Antanas Viskantas (1877–1940), Lithuanian priest, writer, cultural figure, founder of the Society of Saint Casimir and "Vilniaus lietuvių meno ir literatūros draugija" ("Lithuanian art and literature organization of Vilnius")
- Povilas Višinskis (1875–1906), book smuggler, writer
- Michał Węsławski (1849–1917), Polish politician, mayor of Vilnius
- Witold Węsławski (1855–1930), Polish physician and educator
- Jan Kazimierz Wilczyński (1806–1885), Polish-Lithuanian physician, collector and publisher
- Antoni Wiwulski (1877–1919), Polish-Lithuanian architect and sculptor
- Stanisław Karol Władyczko (1878–1936), Polish neurologist and psychiatrist, professor at the Institute Psychoneurological in St. Petersburg and the Stefan Batory University
- Tadeusz Wróblewski, (1858–1925) Polish lawyer, bibliophile
- Bronisław Wróblewski (1888–1941), Polish lawyer
- Bronisław Żongołłowicz (1879–1944), Polish Catholic priest, professor at the University of Stefan Batory, member of the Sejm
- Zigmas Žemaitis (1884–1969), Lithuanian mathematician, board member (1909–15) of Lithuanian Scientific Society, chairman of Higher Courses of Study (Aukštieji kursai) in Kaunas (University of Lithuania from 1922), aviation enthusiast, prominent cultural figure

There is also a mass grave of Poles kidnapped in 1919 from Vilnius by the Bolsheviks and shot at Daugavpils. In the middle of the cemetery, on the so-called Hill of Angels (Angelų kalnelis) there is also cenotaph of an angel, dedicated to unborn babies.

== See also ==
- Antakalnis Cemetery
- Bernardine Cemetery
- List of cemeteries in Lithuania

== Bibliography ==
- Kviklys, Bronius (1985). Lietuvos bažnyčios. V tomas: Vilniaus arkiviskupija, I dalis (in Lithuanian). Chicago, Illinois: Lithuanian Library Press. pp. 407–413. ISBN 0932042546.
