= Nadas Rastenis =

Lithuanian poet, translator, and lawyer (1891–1980)

- Born: Nikodemas Rastenis; January 16, 1891; Stagalėnai, Russian Empire
- Died: May 10, 1980 (aged 89); Baltimore, United States
- Citizenship: United States
- Education: Boston University
- Occupations: Poet, translator
- Spouse: Julė Baltrukonytė
- Relatives: Mikas Petrauskas (cousin)
- Writing career
- Language: Lithuanian, English
- Subject: Pacifism
- Notable work: War's Curse (1941)
- Notable awards: Edgar Allan Poe Award

Nadas Rastenis (16 January 1891 – 10 May 1980) was a Lithuanian poet, translator, and lawyer. Rastenis translated numerous well-known Lithuanian poems to English, such as The Seasons and The Forest of Anykščiai, as well as English poems to Lithuanian, such as Venus and Adonis, the Rubaiyat of Omar Khayyam, and The Raven. For his pacifist 1941 poem War's Curse, Rastenis was nominated for the Nobel Peace Prize in 1967, but did not win.

== Biography ==
Nadas Rastenis was born on 16 January 1891 in the village of Stagalėnai, then part of the Russian Empire, to Antanas Rastenis and Domicelė Rastenienė née Juršėnaitė. Rastenis's grandfather moved to Stagalėnai after the emancipation reform of 1861. Having been able to read from an early age, Rastenis attended a Russian-language primary school in Linkmenys. However, Rastenis's father fell ill, and Rastenis soon returned to his father's farm. In 1909, Rastenis moved to St. Petersburg and continued living abroad in various Russian cities, working as a firewood unloader near railroad tracks and on the excavation of a new dock for the Russian fleet at the Baltic Sea. In 1911, he returned to Lithuania. Rastenis borrowed money for his emigration from a Jew from Palūšė.

On 25 May 1911, he emigrated to the United States, reaching New Hampshire on 14 July 1911. For three years, Rastenis lived in various northeastern cities and worked in weavers' shops. From 1912, Rastenis participated in the Lithuanian Freedom Ploughmen Self-Help Society and the Lithuanian American Socialist Society. In 1918, Rastenis was naturalized, and that same year conscripted in the United States Army, serving in Europe during World War One where he sustained injuries. In 1921, Rastenis joined the American Lithuanian National Society, and served as its vice-chairman (1923–1925) and chairman (1927–1928). He also participated in the activities of the Lithuanian American Association and Lithuanian Grand Duke Kęstutis Self-Help Society in Baltimore. In addition to his societal work, Rastenis graduated from Boston University in June 1924, and actively practiced law from 1925 to 1936 in Baltimore and Cleveland. Additionally, he acted and sang in the operettas of his cousin Mikas Petrauskas. Rastenis met Julė Baltrukonytė in Boston, while Petrauskas was staging an opera. They married on 18 June 1927. Rastenis was a member of the Maryland House of Delegates from 1942 to 1946.

Rastenis died on 10 May 1980 in Baltimore at the age of 89.

== Works ==
=== Poems ===
Rastenis's first poems were published in the Keleivis magazine in 1917 in the Lithuanian language. Nevertheless, he began publishing in English in 1921. He also edited the Lithuanian diaspora Dirva and Sandara magazines. In 1949, Rastenis published a larger poem entitled Trijų rožių šventė (Three Roses Festival), which he illustrated himself.

=== Translations ===
In 1938, Rastenis notably translated The Seasons by 18th-century Lithuanian poet Kristijonas Donelaitis into English. The translation also included illustrations drawn by Rastenis and a portrait of Donelaitis created by Telesforas Kulakauskas. Rastenis also had translated The Forest of Anykščiai by Antanas Baranauskas into English in 1934. Among other translations of his are FitzGerald's translation of the Rubaiyat of Omar Khayyam into Lithuanian and Bronė Buivydaitė's Jūratė ir Kastytis into English.

=== War's Curse & Noble Peace Prize nomination ===
Rastenis wrote his most famous work, War's Curse, in 1941. The pacifist poem was published in periodical publications, but did not garner significant attention. It gained popularity only after Congressman Edward Garmatz published it in the Congressional Record in 1966. Rastenis was subsequently made a member of the United Poets Laureate International. In 1967, Rastenis received the City of Baltimore Mayor’s Citation and the State of Maryland Certificate of Distinguished Citizenship. Also, for "outstanding achievement in poetry", Rastenis was presented the Certificate of Competitive Award by the Maryland’s Citizens Poetry society and the Edgar Allan Poe Award for "outstanding and generous contribution to the cultural life of the state of Maryland through many years of creative art in the field of poetry." That same year, he was nominated for the Nobel Peace Prize, but did not win.

== Remembrance ==
A memorial plate was uncovered at his village home. In 2024, a play was staged that depicted Rastenis.
