= Birutė (opera) =

Lithuanian opera

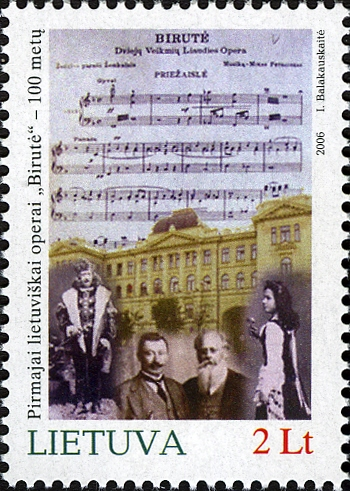
2006 postal stamp for the 100th anniversary of opera Birutė

Birutė is a two-act opera composed by Mikas Petrauskas based on the play by Gabrielius Landsbergis-Žemkalnis. It was first performed on 6 November 1906 in Vilnius and became the first Lithuanian national opera. The plot is based on the medieval legend about the love between Birutė and Grand Duke of Lithuania Kęstutis recorded in the Lithuanian Chronicles. The opera was written for the amateur Lithuanian performers and thus is mostly valued for its historical significance.

== Plot ==
The opera is set during the 14th-century Lithuanian Crusade. Winrich von Kniprode, komtur of the Teutonic Order, wishes to marry Birutė, daughter of the ruler of Palanga. In Act I, von Kniprode sends his envoys to persuade Birutė's father to agree to the marriage. If persuasion and gifts fail, they are prepared to take her by force. Birutė weeps and asks her father to kill her instead. However, krivių krivaitis (chief pagan priest) Lizdeika decrees that it is the will of the gods for Birutė to become a vaidilutė (pagan priestess similar to Roman vestales). In Act II, as Birutė prepares to be initiated, an old vaidila (priest or prophet) makes a prophesy that Birutė is destined to become the mother of a giant who will defeat the Teutonic Order (veiled reference to her son Grand Duke Vytautas and the Battle of Grunwald). Grand Duke Kęstutis arrives to the scene and becomes captivated by Birutė. He learns that the plan for her to become a vaidilutė is only a means to avoid the marriage to the Teutonic komtur, interrupts the initiation ceremony, and proposes to Birutė. As she agrees, a choir starts praising the homeland.

== Analysis ==
Birutė is a two-act opera similar to a singspiel. It has 12 music numbers connected by spoken dialogues. Such structure reflects realities of the amateur Lithuanian theater in 1906. It was intended for a one-time performance by a group of amateurs. There was no permanent troupe, orchestra, or premises. Therefore, the music could not be long or complex. Additionally, Mikas Petrauskas, while a graduate of the Saint Petersburg Conservatory, was not trained in composition. He composed the music in a few weeks while hiding from the Tsarist police. Therefore, the opera has hurried and amateurish components. In his study of the opera, Vytautas Landsbergis concluded that the opera is not very artistic, but is valuable for its historical significance during the Lithuanian National Revival and the early stages of the Lithuanian theatre.

Music numbers are traditional operatic (arias, ariosos) or popular (polonaises, mazurkas) compositions that have little in common with the Lithuanian folk songs. They reveal character's feelings, goals, or view of the events. The opera opens with an aria by Birutė which is based on laments and at one point switches to melodeclamation. Birutė's second aria is perhaps most valuable and artistic. After meeting Kęstutis, she sings about her feelings that grow from a dream into an open declaration of love. In contrast, Kęstutis does not sing a single line.

One of the most popular numbers is a song by the old vaidila with a women's choir. Petrauskas used arpeggio chord to create a serious and epic-sounding melody in leisurely tempo. Both acts end with solemn but uplifting songs by choirs that summarize the events. For songs by the choir of vaidilutės, Petrauskas attempted to create a sense of antiquity by using noble melody, asymmetric period structure, and mixolydian mode. Vivid numbers for choirs reflected Petrauskas experience working with choirs.

== History ==
=== First performance ===
The plot is based on the medieval legend which became popular among Lithuanians after Silvestras Teofilis Valiūnas (1789–1831) wrote a song inspired by the legend. There was also a play about Kęstutis by Adam Asnyk which was translated from Polish by Vincas Kudirka and performed by various Lithuanian societies. Gabrielius Landsbergis-Žemkalnis modified the plot of Valiūnas' song and wrote a play which is characterized as a melodrama. According to Liudas Gira, the play was written in 1900 soon after Landsbergis-Žemkalnis was released from the prison in Liepāja. It was published in 1906. That summer Mikas Petrauskas composed music for the opera. It was first staged by the Kanklės of Vilnius Society on 6 November [O.S. 24 October] 1906 at the present-day Lithuanian National Philharmonic Society. Because Petrauskas was searched by the Tsarist police, his name was not advertised and the performers did not take any photographs.

The original cast included:

- Marija Piaseckaitė-Šlapelienė as Birutė
- Kazys Puida as Kęstutis
- Gabrielius Landsbergis-Žemkalnis as old vaidila
- Antanas Žmuidzinavičius as Lizdeika
- Kipras Petrauskas, Stasys Audėjus as Birutė's brothers

=== Later performances ===
Birutė was staged again on 15 August 1909 in Vilnius to commemorate the 10th anniversary of America in the Bathhouse, the first public performance of a Lithuanian play in Lithuania. It was directed by Juozas Tallat-Kelpša and organized by the Lithuanian Mutual Aid Society of Vilnius. In the Russian Empire, the opera was performed on 17 July 1910 in Marijampolė to commemorate the 500th anniversary of the Battle of Grunwald and in June 1911 in Riga.

When Petrauskas immigrated to the United States, he staged Birutė for Lithuanian Americans. The first performance was organized by the Birutė choir established by Petrauskas in 1908. It was held at the International Theatre in Chicago and an American symphony orchestra directed by Theodore Thomas was hired for the occasion. Later the opera was performed in Brooklyn, Boston, and other Lithuanian American communities.

In independent Lithuania, Birutė was staged on 15 August 1919 in Kaunas to commemorate the 20th anniversary of America in the Bathhouse. On 16 February 1921 (Lithuania's independence day), the opera was staged by the National Opera (present-day Lithuanian National Opera and Ballet Theatre). It was the second opera produced by the theatre after La traviata. Scenography was created by Adomas Varnas, Petras Kalpokas, and Paulius Galaunė while costumes were imported from abroad. However, Birutė attracted little interest and was cancelled after four performances. The opera returned to Kaunas on 23 April 1925. This performance was organized by Petrauskas and his newly established troupe. He hoped that it would lead to a permanent employment and that he could remain in Lithuania. However, the troupe was not well received and Petrauskas returned to the United States.

50th and 70th anniversaries of Birutė were commemorated in Lithuania and by Lithuanians in the United States. For the 50th anniversary, Lithuanian Americans broadcast the opera on the radio.

In 2006, to commemorate the 100th anniversary of Birutė, the Lithuanian National Philharmonic Society staged the opera anew. The full score has not survived, but Petrauskas published the piano–vocal score in 1928. Therefore, the score was written again by the composer Teisutis Makačinas. To provide a more Lithuanian sound, harp was replaced with the Lithuanian kanklės. This new version of Birutė was performed in Vilnius in 2006, during the Pažaislis Music Festival in 2007, in Biržai in 2008. A CD with the performance was published in 2009. On 6 July 2013 (the Statehood Day), Birutė was performed near Birutė Hill in Palanga (the location where the opera is set).
