= Kanklės of Vilnius Society =

Lithuanian cultural society

Kanklės of Vilnius Society (kanklės is a Lithuanian folk instrument; Lithuanian: Vaidintojų, muzikantų ir dainuotojų draugija "Vilniaus kanklės") was a cultural society of Lithuanians active in Vilnius, then part of the Russian Empire, from 1905 to 1908. It was one of the first legal Lithuanian societies in Vilnius. It organized amateur theater performances, concerts and dances, and other cultural events. The society was chaired by Gabrielius Landsbergis-Žemkalnis who directed and staged its plays. The society was most active in 1906 when, among other plays, it staged the historical drama Pilėnų kunigaikštis (Duke of Pilėnai), two operettas by Mikas Petrauskas, and the first Lithuanian opera Birutė. However, due to internal disagreements and financial difficulties, the activities started to diminish in 1907 and the society become inactive in 1908. In its mission, Kanklės was succeeded by the more successful Rūta Society.

== History ==
=== Organization ===
Legal Lithuanian societies became possible due to the Russian Revolution of 1905. Kanklės of Vilnius held its organizational meeting on 10 November 1905. About 50 people joined the society during this meeting; the membership fee was set at 1 ruble per year. Its most active members were Gabrielius Landsbergis-Žemkalnis (first chairman), Jonas Vileišis, and Kazys Puida. The society organized cultural evenings – mostly amateur theater performances but also concerts, dances, etc. In this regard, it competed with the Lithuanian Mutual Aid Society of Vilnius which also organized Lithuanian cultural events to raise funds for its other activities. Kanklės of Vilnius was established because the membership fees of the Mutual Aid Society were too high (25 rubles to join) and it was limited to four cultural events a year. The two societies attempted to cooperate and split the efforts and profits in half, but the deal quickly broke down. Landsbergis-Žemkalnis had ambitions of leading the entire Lithuanian theater movement.

=== Activities ===
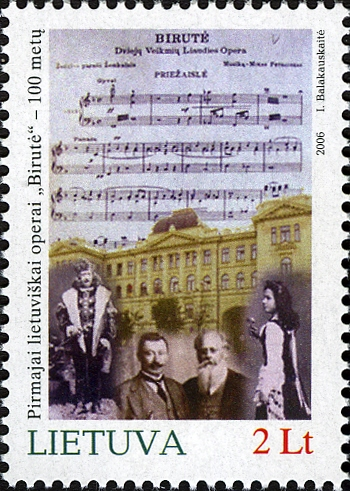
2006 postal stamp for the 100th anniversary of opera Birutė

The first theater performance (featuring a three-act play by Adomas Sketeris, a one-act farce by Petras Pundzevičius-Petliukas, and Lithuanian folk songs by a choir directed by Mikas Petrauskas) was held on 20 November 1905. It was held a day before the Great Seimas of Vilnius.

As with many other Lithuanian amateur theaters of the time, repertoire of Kanklės could be divided into two categories – historical dramas that glorified the past and simple comedies from everyday life. Comedies performed by Kanklės included America in the Bathhouse, as well as comedies by Petras Pundzevičius-Petliukas, Joseph Conrad, Władysław Koziebrodzki, Gabrielė Petkevičaitė-Bitė and Žemaitė, Juozas Tumas-Vaižgantas. The society also staged a drama based on Niziny (Lowlands) by Eliza Orzeszkowa.

In April 1906 it organized an event to mark the 100th anniversary of the linguist Friedrich Kurschat. The event included songs by the society's choir and a lecture by Jonas Jablonskis about Kurschat. In May 1906, the society staged five-act historical drama Pilėnų kunigaikštis (Duke of Pilėnai) by Marcelinas Šikšnys. It was an ambitious production that required a large number of performers, historical costumes and decorations. In summer 1906, the society toured other Lithuanian cities, including Švenčionys, Jonava, Kybartai, Ukmergė. On 1 October 1906, the society staged two operettas by Mikas Petrauskas, Adomas ir Ieva (Adam and Eve) and Kaminkrėtys ir malūnininkas (Chimney Sweep and Miller). Due to lack of Lithuanian singers, the society enlisted the help of the Polish choir Łutnia. On 24 October 1906, the society staged the first Lithuanian opera Birutė. It featured the first public performance of Kipras Petrauskas; Lithuanian activists were so impressed with his abilities that they organized a special committee to raise funds for Petrauskas' studies at the Saint Petersburg Conservatory. In December 1906, the society's choir performed at the opening ceremony of the First Lithuanian Art Exhibition.

Society's activities started to diminish in 1907. Early in 1907, the society organized at least seven evenings with dances and music, but they were criticized in the Lithuanian press because they had too little Lithuanian or patriotic content. In November 1907, when Gabrielius Landsbergis-Žemkalnis returned to Vilnius, the society staged his Blinda, a four-act drama about the folk hero Tadas Blinda.

At different times, the actors at the society's performances included Liudas Gira, Ona Pleirytė-Puidienė, Povilas Gaidelionis, Kazys Alyta, Stasys Šimkus, Marija Šlapelienė, Vaclovas Biržiška, Antanas Smetona, Stasys Audėjus, Antanas Žmuidzinavičius.

=== Dissolution ===
In early 1906, twelve young theater performers (including Liudas Gira) resigned from Kanklės and joined the Mutual Aid Society. This was a protest against the sense of superiority of its leaders and disregard of opinions of the younger members. The revolt was likely inspired by an event held at the house of Petras Vileišis which charged 1 ruble for the entrance – much too steep of a price for the younger and poorer members.

The society's mixed choir was directed by Mikas Petrauskas, but he fled to Switzerland due to troubles with the Tsarist police in late 1906. After him, the choir was briefly directed by several men, including Mikalojus Konstantinas Čiurlionis, Stasys Šimkus, Juozas Tallat-Kelpša. The choir performed mainly Lithuanian folk songs as well as songs by Vincas Kudirka, Mikas Petrauskas, Mikalojus Konstantinas Čiurlionis. The loss of Petrauskas and lack of talented performers forced Kaklės to reconcile with the Mutual Aid Society. The cooperation agreement was concluded in November 1906.

In December 1906, Gabrielius Landsbergis-Žemkalnis who directed all plays resigned as chairman and was replaced by Jonas Vileišis. However, faced with internal disagreements and financial difficulties, the society started to diminish. It was still active in 1908, the board held meetings and organized a few dance evenings, but was unable to revive the troubled society. In its mission, Kanklės was succeeded by the more successful Rūta Society.

== Bibliography ==
- Aničas, Jonas (1999). Antanas ir Emilija Vileišiai: Gyvenimo ir veiklos bruožai (in Lithuanian). Alma littera. ISBN 9986-02-794-2.
- Būtėnas, Julius (1938). "Lietuvių teatras Vilniuje". Mūsų senovė (in Lithuanian). 2–3.
- Deltuvas, Romualdas (13 February 2015). "Lietuvybės gaivinimo Vilniuje pėdsakais, arba Kas yra lietuviško teatro tėvas (II)". Literatūra ir menas (in Lithuanian). 7 (3508).
- Karaška, Arvydas (6 February 2020) [2014]. ""Vilniaus kanklės"". Visuotinė lietuvių enciklopedija (in Lithuanian). Mokslo ir enciklopedijų leidybos centras.
- Šabasevičius, Helmutas (2000). "Vilniaus kultūra 1904-1914. Faktai. Idėjos. Asmenybės" (PDF). Menotyra (in Lithuanian). 4. ISSN 1392-1002.
