= Jadvihin Š. =

Belarusian writer, playwright, poet, publicist

- Ядвігін Ш. (Антон Лявіцкі)
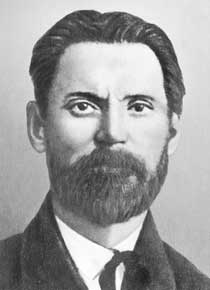
- Born: Anton Lavicki; 16 January 1869; Dobasnia, Mogilev Governorate, Russian Empire
- Died: 23 February 1922 (aged 53); Wilno, Central Lithuania
- Resting place: Rasos Cemetery
- Education: Moscow Imperial University
- Occupations: Belarusian novelist, playwright and publicist
- Known for: One of the founders of modern Belarusian prose

Jadvihin Š. (Belarusian: Ядвігін Ш.) was the pen name of Anton Lavicki (Belarusian: Антон Лявіцкі, 16 January 1869 – 23 February 1922) who was a Belarusian novelist, playwright and publicist, "one of the founders of modern Belarusian prose".

== Early years ==
Jadvihin Š. was born as Anton Lavicki on the Dobasnia estate in what was then Rahačoŭ District of Mogilev Governorate (now Kiraŭsk District). His family soon moved to Piaršai, where his father worked as a ranger for Count Tyškevič of Valožyn, and then to Karpilaŭka, near Radaškovičy. Jadvihin Š. studied at a school in Lucynca, which was set up by the daughter of the writer and playwright Dunin-Marcynkievič.

Later, he graduated from the Minsk Provincial Gymnasium and enrolled in the Moscow Imperial University to study medicine. For his participation in student unrest, he was sent to Butyrka prison and expelled from the university. After his release, he managed to receive a qualification in pharmacy and returned to Karpilaŭka.

Soon he moved to Radaškovičy, where he worked as an assistant pharmacist and got involved in the town's cultural life, including literary parties. He began to study literature and wrote the play The Crook, which was staged locally before being banned by the Tzarist police.

== Literary career ==
In 1906, Jadvihin Š. started making contributions to the newspapers Naša Dola and Naša Niva and later moved to Wilno to work in Naša Niva's editorial office, where he got acquainted with the Belarusian poets Janka Kupała and Maksim Bahdanovič.

From 1913, he worked in the editorial office of the newspaper The Belarusian and was also the technical editor of the magazine The Plow and The Luchina.

== WW1 and involvement in Belarusian independence movement ==
During the First World War, he organised a shelter for refugee children in Karpilaŭka and worked in the Minsk branch of the Belarusian Society for Aid to War Victims.

In March 1917, after the February Revolution, Jadvihin Š. took part in the Congress of Belarusian Organisations, worked in its press commission and zemstvo commission. In July 1917, he was elected to the executive committee of the Central Council of Belarusian Organisations and in October became a member of the committee which initiated the convening of the All-Belarusian Congress.

In March 1918, Jadvihin Š. became a member of the Rada of the Belarusian Democratic Republic on a mandate from the Society of Belarusian Culture. In fall 1920, he supported the Belarusian campaign of General Bułak-Balachovič and later became one of the founders of the Belarusian Peasant Party Green Oak, which, with the support of Poland, waged a resistance campaign against the Bolsheviks.

== Death and memory ==
In 1921, he returned from Polesia to Wilno and became a member of the Belarusian Academic Society. However, he soon fell ill with tuberculosis and died in 1922.

Jadvihin Š. is buried at the Vilnius Rasos Cemetery. A memorial stone was installed in Radaškovičy at the place where there used to be the pharmacy in which he worked.

== Pen name ==
One theory about the writer's pen name is that it was chosen in honour of his inamorata, Jadviha Šabunevič, from Radaškovičy .

== Literary legacy ==
Legacy of Jadvihin Š. is wide-ranging – from psychological novellas to parables to fables. They were published in the collections Grandfather Zavala (1910), The Birch Tree (1912) and Cornflowers (1914). He also wrote the essays Letters from the Road, in which the author describes his 500 km trek across Belarus, the memoir Memories (1921), and the unfinished novel Gold.
