= Kirawsk district =

District of Mogilev region, Belarus

Coordinates: 53°16′07″N 29°28′25″E

Kirawsk district Кіраўскі раён (Belarusian) Кировский район (Russian)
- District
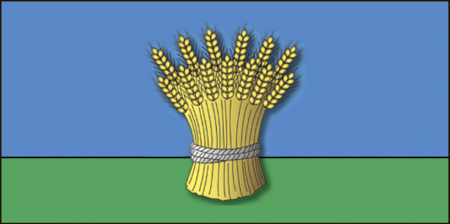
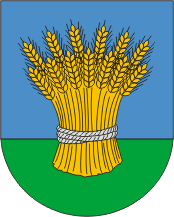
- Flag Coat of arms

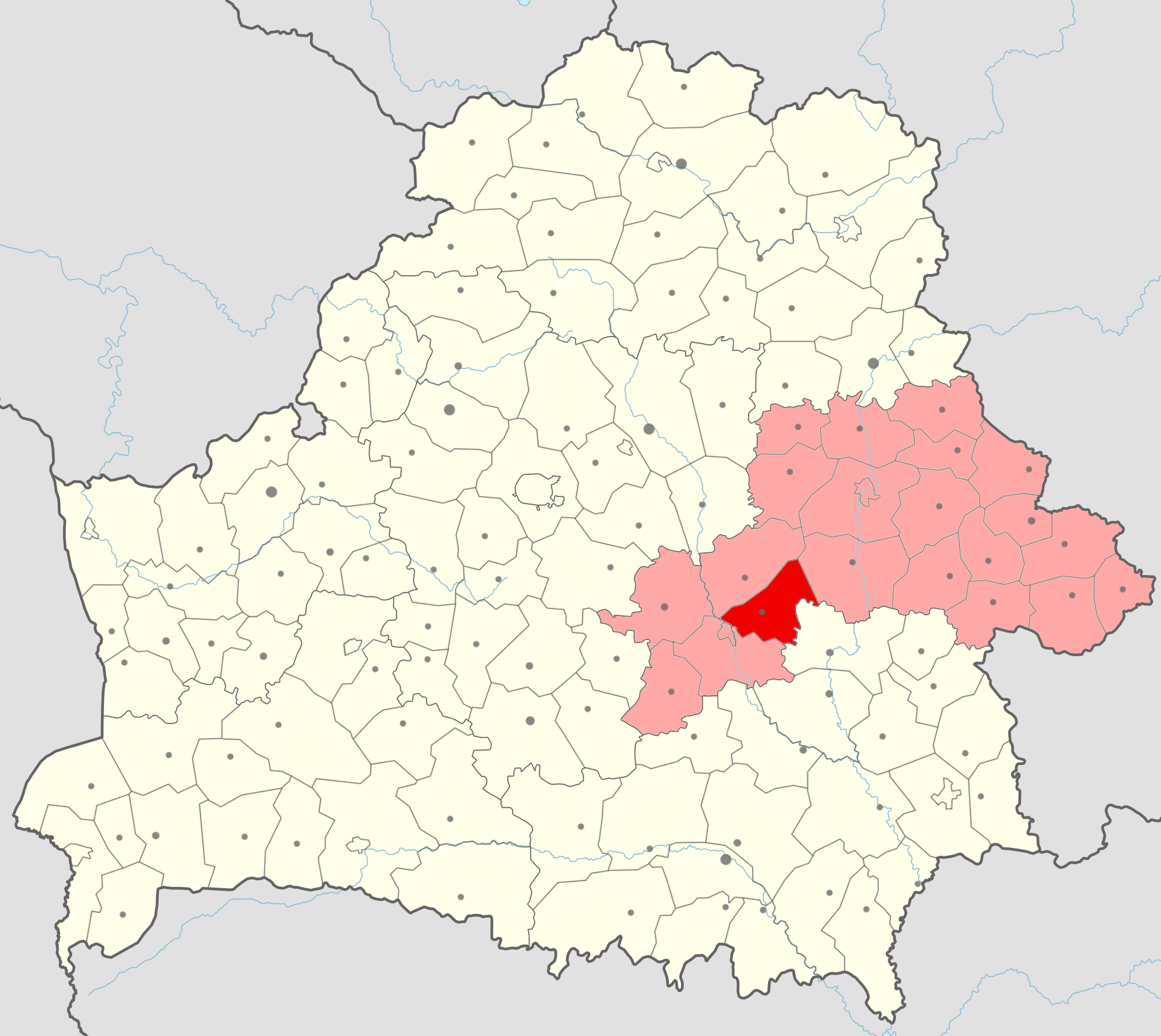
- Country: Belarus
- Region: Mogilev region
- Administrative center: Kirawsk

Area
  - Total: 1,295.20 km^{2} (500.08 sq mi)

Population (2023)
  - Total: 17,235
  - Density: 13.307/km^{2} (34.465/sq mi)
- Time zone: UTC+3 (MSK)

Kirawsk district or Kiraŭsk district (Belarusian: Кіраўскі раён; Russian: Кировский район, romanized: Kirovsky rayon) is a district (raion) of Mogilev region in Belarus. The administrative center is the town of Kirawsk. As of 2009, its population was 22,352. The population of Kirawsk accounts for 39.2% of the district's population.

Two major Belarusian automobile roads pass through the raion: P93 and M5 (European route E271).

== Notable residents ==
- Jadvihin Š. (Anton Lavicki) (1869, Dobasnia – 1922), Belarusian novelist, playwright and publicist
