= Kirawsk =

Kirawsk Кіраўск (Belarusian) Кировск (Russian)
- Town
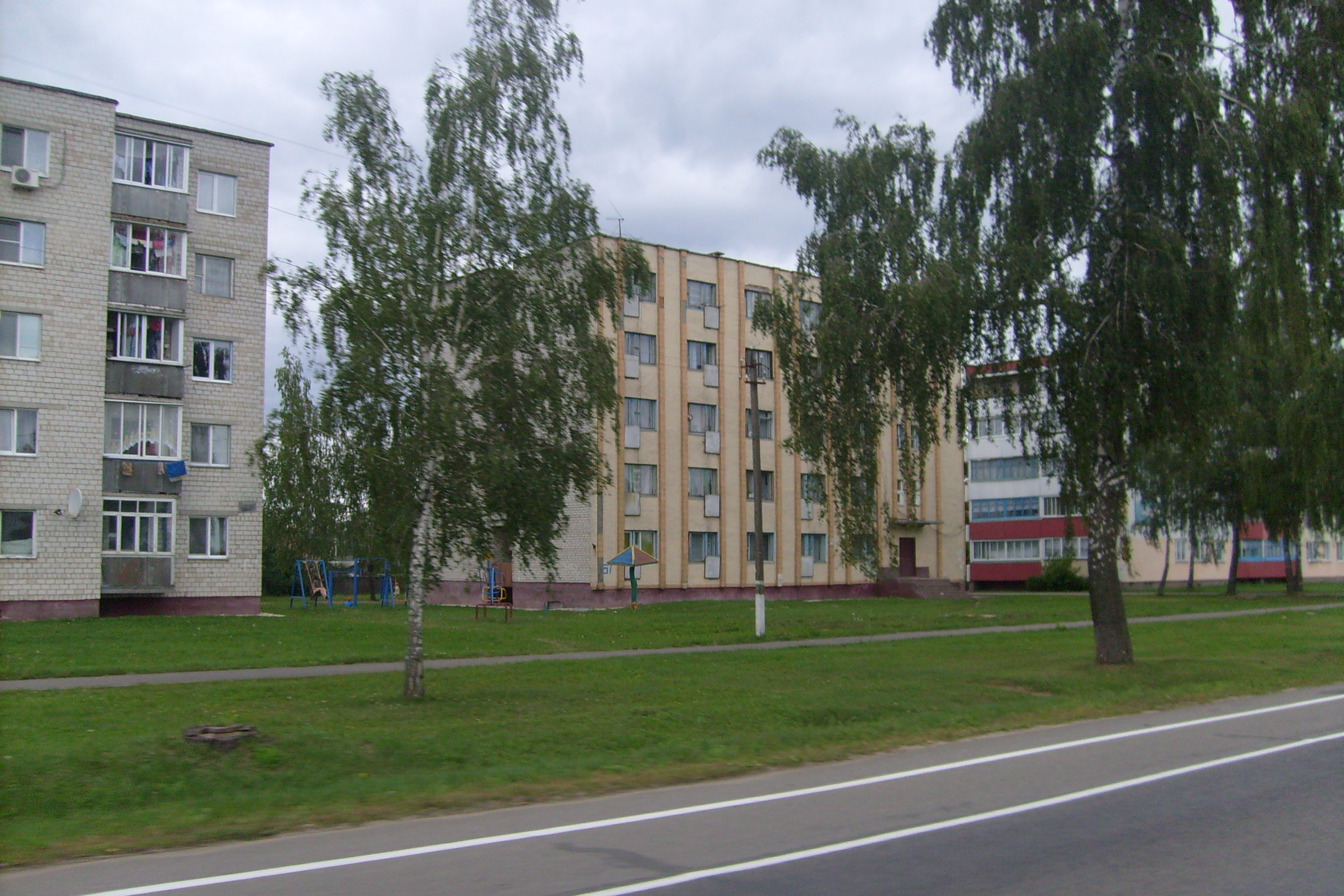

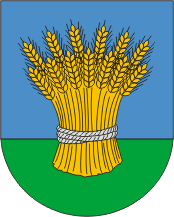
- Seal

- Location within Belarus
- Coordinates: 53°16′9.12″N 29°28′22.8″E
- Country: Belarus
- Region: Mogilev Region
- District: Kirawsk District

Population (2025)
  - Total: 7,806
- Time zone: UTC+3 (MSK)

Kirawsk or Kirovsk (Belarusian: Кіраўск, romanized: Kiraŭsk; Russian: Кировск) is a town in Mogilev Region, Belarus. It serves as the administrative center of Kirawsk District. In 2009, its population was 8,756. As of 2025, it has a population of 7,806.
