= Mikas Petrauskas =

Lithuanian composer

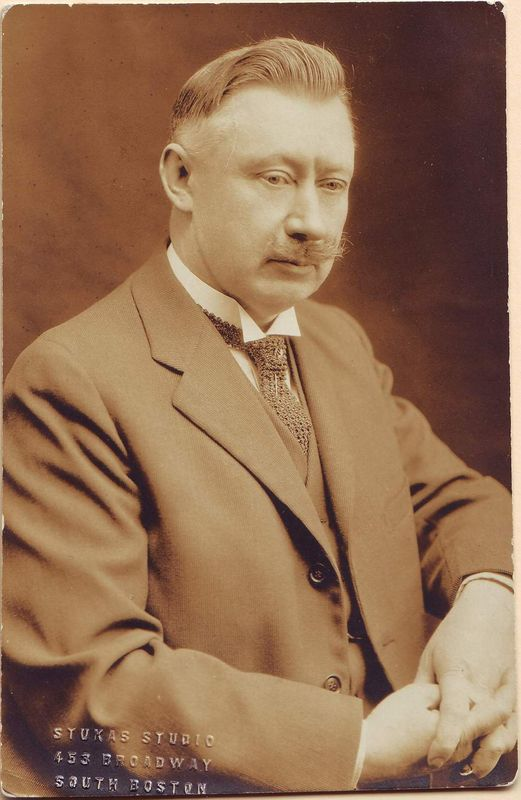
- Petrauskas in Boston
- Born: 13 October 1873; Palūšė, Russian Empire
- Died: 23 March 1937 (aged 63); Kaunas, Lithuania
- Burial place: Rasos Cemetery
- Education: Saint Petersburg Conservatory
- Occupations: Composer, choirmaster, singer
- Known for: First Lithuanian opera Birutė
- Relatives: Brother Kipras Petrauskas

Mikas Petrauskas (1873–1937) was a Lithuanian composer and choirmaster best known as the author of the first Lithuanian opera Birutė (1906). He was an elder brother of the singer Kipras Petrauskas.

Petrauskas learned to play church organ from his father and began working as an organist at the age of 15. He worked in Labanoras, Obeliai, and Hierviaty before enrolling at the Saint Petersburg Conservatory in 1901. As a student, he wrote and staged the first Lithuanian operettas. In 1905, he moved to Vilnius where he became leader of the choir of Kanklės of Vilnius Society and staged his opera Birutė in 1906. Trouble with the Tsarist police forced him to leave the Russian Empire first for Switzerland and then for the United States. There he organized various concerts and theater performances, opened a music school, and established and led choirs and other performing groups among Lithuanian Americans. He organized and led Birutė choir in Chicago and Gabija choir in Boston. Both choirs continued to perform until 1950s. His music school operated from 1910 to 1924 and had up to 130 students per year. By his own estimate, during the first 17 years in the United States, he taught music and singing to some 4,000 people. He returned to Lithuania in 1930 and died in 1937.

Petrauskas works include two operas, 19 operettas, and about 200 songs.

== Biography ==
=== Early life and education ===
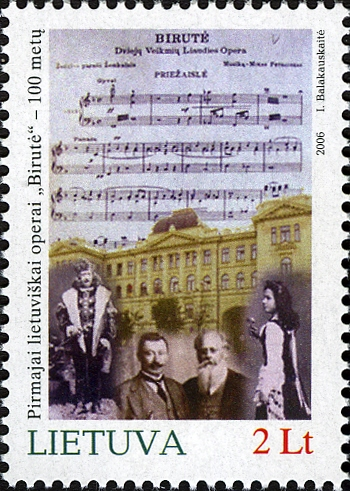
2006 postal stamp for the 100th anniversary of opera Birutė

Petrauskas was born on 13 October 1873 in Palūšė in present-day Lithuania. His father was a church organist and could sing as a tenor. His mother could sing as contralto and participated in a church choir. His father reportedly joined the Uprising of 1863 and supported the Lithuanian book smugglers. The family had eight children, but only four reached adulthood.

Petrauskas learned to play the organ from his father and already at the age of 15 started playing the organ at the church of Labanoras. He also led a local choir and an orchestra. In 1889, he moved to work as church organist in Obeliai. To help his parents, Petrauskas took in his younger brother Kipras and enrolled him into a local primary school. He later moved to Hyervyaty in present-day Belarus where he organized a large choir and orchestra.

In 1898–1899, he attended the Rokiškis Music School which specialized in church organs. In February 1901, he enrolled at the Saint Petersburg Conservatory and chose to specialize in singing. Among his teachers were Stanislav Gabel (singing), Anatoly Lyadov (music theory), Georgi Rimskij-Korsakov (composition). At the same time, Petrauksas studied at a gymnasium for adults. Despite busy academic life, Petrauskas joined Lithuanian cultural life and organized various cultural evenings. He also performed at the cultural evenings organized by the Lithuanian and Samogitian Charitable Society. He led a Lithuanian youth choir and wrote and staged the first Lithuanian operettas Kaminkrėtys ir malūnininkas (The Chimney Sweep and The Miller; 1903) and Adomas ir Ieva (Adam and Eve; 1905).

During the Russian Revolution of 1905, the Conservatory was temporarily closed and Petrauskas arrived to Vilnius where he became leader of the choir of Kanklės of Vilnius Society. On 24 October 1906, the society staged the first Lithuanian opera Birutė written by Petrauskas based on the melodrama by Gabrielius Landsbergis-Žemkalnis. The day is considered to be the founding day of the Lithuanian opera.

=== In the United States ===
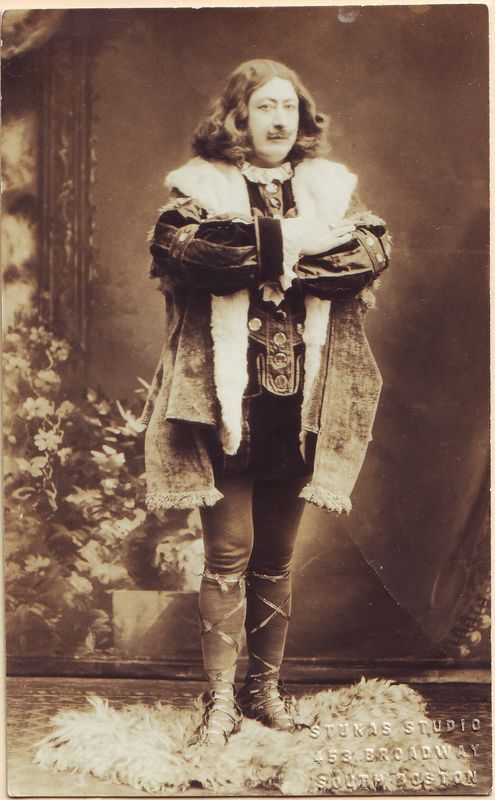
Petrauskas in costume of Žilvinas for his own opera Eglė the Queen of Serpents (1924)

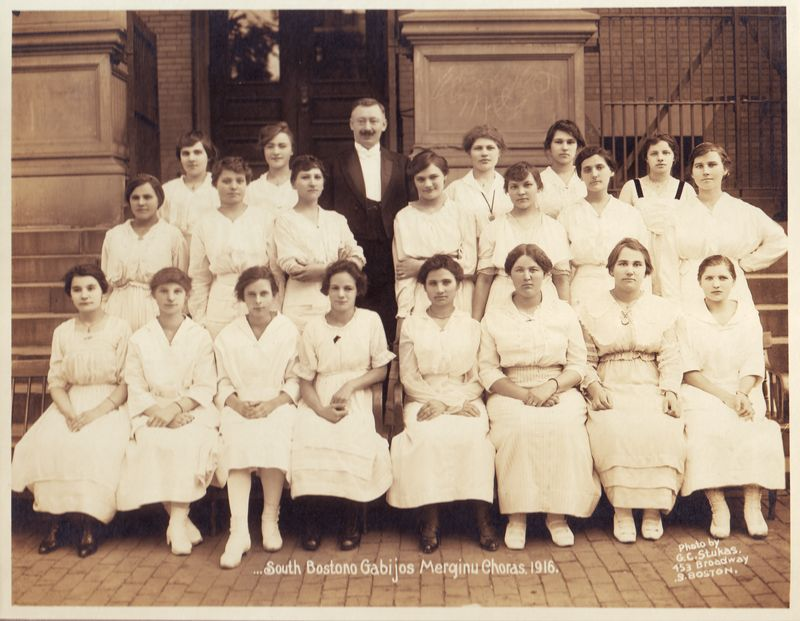
Petrauskas with women from Gabija choir in 1916

Petrauskas was searched by the Tsarist police due to his support of the revolution (he composed revolutionary songs); his brother Kipras was arrested and spent about half a year in prison. To escape the police, Petrauskas left for Geneva, Switzerland at the end of 1906. There he led a choir and staged Natalka Poltavka by Mykola Lysenko. In 1907, he moved to Paris to study composition under Charles-Marie Widor. There he met Lithuanian student Zigmas Skirgaila and they decided to depart to the United States in June 1907. They toured and performed among various Lithuanian American communities. Petrauskas decided to stay in the United States and lived there with interruptions until 1930.

Petrauskas' activities in the United States can be categorized into three groups: leading choirs and organizing Lithuanian cultural evenings, teaching at music courses or so-called conservatories that he founded, and performing in concerts. He frequently changed his residence and lived in Chicago (1907), New York City (1912), Boston (1914).

In Chicago, he organized Menas Society and a 100-member Birutė choir which held its first performance in November 1907. Birutė organized various performances renting theaters in the city and sometimes hiring other orchestras. For example, opera Birutė was staged at the International Theater with the hired orchestra conducted by Theodore Thomas. To commemorate the 25th anniversary of the first Lithuanian theater performance in the United States, Birutė rented the Garrick Theater. Birutė continued to perform until 1956. In Boston, he organized Gabija choir and weekly theater. Gabija staged 17 operettas, recorded six discs in 1915 and another ten in 1920. In addition to Lithuanian works, Gabija also staged such international classics as Faust, Rigoletto, Lucia di Lammermoor. Gabija continued to perform until 1953.

He established a music school, often referred to as conservatory, in 1910. Its first recitals took place in early 1911 at the Hull House. The school changed locations as he moved to different cities. For a while, it had chapters in Brooklyn, Newark, and Elizabeth. According to Petrauskas, he was dissatisfied that many students were non-Lithuanians (Jews, Russians, etc.) and therefore decided to move from New York to a larger Lithuanian community in South Boston. The number of students varied from 30 to 130 in a given year. Most students took classes more as a hobby and did not graduate with a degree. In total, 37 people graduated as choir masters, eight as choir masters and conductors, and six as music teachers. The students included Antanas Sodeika, Rojus Mizara, Jonas Būtėnas, Marijona Rakauskaitė. Between 1917 and 1920, the school published 44 volumes of Kanklės with many compositions by Petrauskas. The school closed in 1924.

Petrauskas also organized various concerts for Lithuanian American communities. He was a tenor and his repertoire included operatic arias by western and Russian composers, various romances, and his own compositions. He was among the first to improve and perfect Lithuanian folk songs. These improves songs were published in seven booklets Lietuviškos dainos (Lithuanian songs). Between 1913 and 1927, he recorded about 50 discs with Lithuanian folk songs. To improve his singing, he studied bel canto in Italy and performed at Italian theaters in 1911–1912.

Petrauskas also published articles on music in the Lithuanian press. His major article Iš muzikos srities (From the Field of Music) was first published in Lietuva and then as a separate booklet in 1909. It is a compilation of other published material, but it provided some basic information on Lithuanian folk music. In 1916, he also published Mažas muzikos žodynėlis (Small Music Dictionary), a short reference for his students which translated Italian music terms to English and Lithuanian. It remained the only Lithuanian musical dictionary until 1960.

=== Return to Lithuania ===
He returned to Lithuania in summer 1912 and performed in various cities including Vilnius, Linkuva, Rokiškis, Kėdainiai, Ukmergė, Zarasai, as well as Tilsit in East Prussia. The concerts were organized by Martynas Yčas as a cover for his political campaign for the September 1912 elections to the Russian State Duma. The repertoire included arias by Ruggero Leoncavallo, Stanisław Moniuszko, Charles Gounod, Giuseppe Verdi as well as Lithuanian songs. Petrauskas was accompanied by pianists sisters Elena and Jadvyga Neimanytės.

Petrauskas visited Lithuania again in summer 1920. He performed Lithuanian folk songs with his brother Kipras and his student Antanas Sodeika and staged a couple of operettas in Šiauliai. When he returned in 1924, he hoped to stay but was struck by lightning, could not get a permanent job, and was forced to return to the United States. He visited Lithuania again in 1925 and 1926. He attempted to organize a music school and a theater group with which he staged opera Birutė and operetta Vaikas ar mergatė? in 1925 but they were not well received. His poor health and financial situation forced him to move to Detroit where he was cared by dr. Jonas Jonikaitis and to Baltimore where he was cared by poet and cousin Nadas Rastenis.

Petrauskas left United States for good in January 1930 and settled in Kaunas. Many of his manuscripts, including the full score of Birutė, were lost when transporting them through Klaipėda. He moved in to an apartment in the six-unit house that he and his brother Kipras built for US$22,000 (equivalent to $400,094 in 2025). He received a state pension of 500 litas and spent time writing a dictionary of music and a study of orchestras, but they were not published. He died on 23 March 1937 in Kaunas. He was buried in the churchyard of Dusmenys next to his parents; his remains were moved next to his brother Kipras in Rasos Cemetery in Vilnius in 1969.

== Personal life ==
Petrauskas married Stasė Kuraitytė in 1906. She was sister of Marija Kuraitytė-Varnienė, the pioneer of the Montessori education in Lithuania. Petrauskas and Kuraitytė moved to Switzerland, but she did not follow him to the United States. Their son Adakris was born in Vyborg (then part of Finland) in 1909. Kuraitytė died of tuberculosis in 1920.

In 1932, Petrauskas married Aurelija Ona Aranauskaitė, who was born in 1911 in the United States. Their daughter Protelė was born the following year.

== Legacy ==
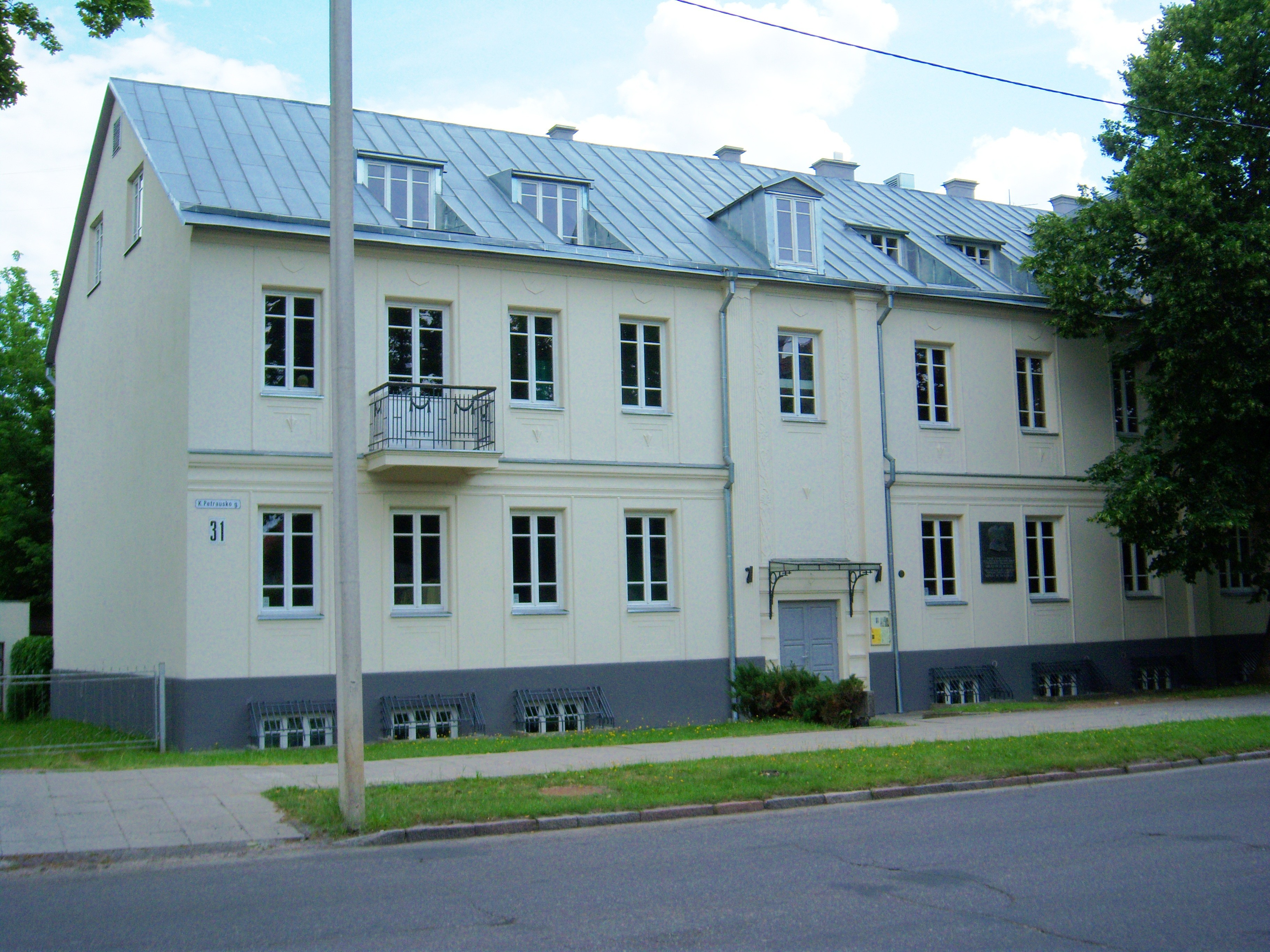
Memorial museum of Mikas and Kipras Petrauskas in Kaunas

Petrauskas has been commemorated both in independent Lithuania and during the Soviet era.

Soon after his death, a fund was established in his memory to support musicians. In 1939, a bust of Petrauskas by sculptor Bronius Pundzius was unveiled near the Kaunas State Musical Theatre.

During the Soviet era, his 90th birth anniversary in 1963 was commemorated with a postage stamp. Jūratė Burokaitė compiled and published a book with his articles, letters, and recollections by his contemporaries in 1976. In 1977, a memorial museum dedicated to Mikas and Kipras Petrauskas was opened in their former apartment in Žaliakalnis neighborhood of Kaunas.

After Lithuania regained its independence, two schools were named after Petrauskas – Kaunas Mikas Petrauskas School of Performing Arts in 1998 (125th birth anniversary) and Ignalina Mikas Petrauskas Music School in 2013 (140th anniversary).

== Works ==
Petrauskas wrote two operas, 19 operettas, 37 solo songs, 17 duet songs, as well as songs for choirs. He also harmonized 143 Lithuanian folk songs. He also wrote nine pieces of instrumental music for teaching students. Some of his works were published in series Kanklės that he published in the United States from 1917 to 1921, but most works remain unpublished. Overall, his music style was not inventive, but had a great influence on the development of the Lithuanian music as simplicity of his works made them widely accessible.

=== Operas ===
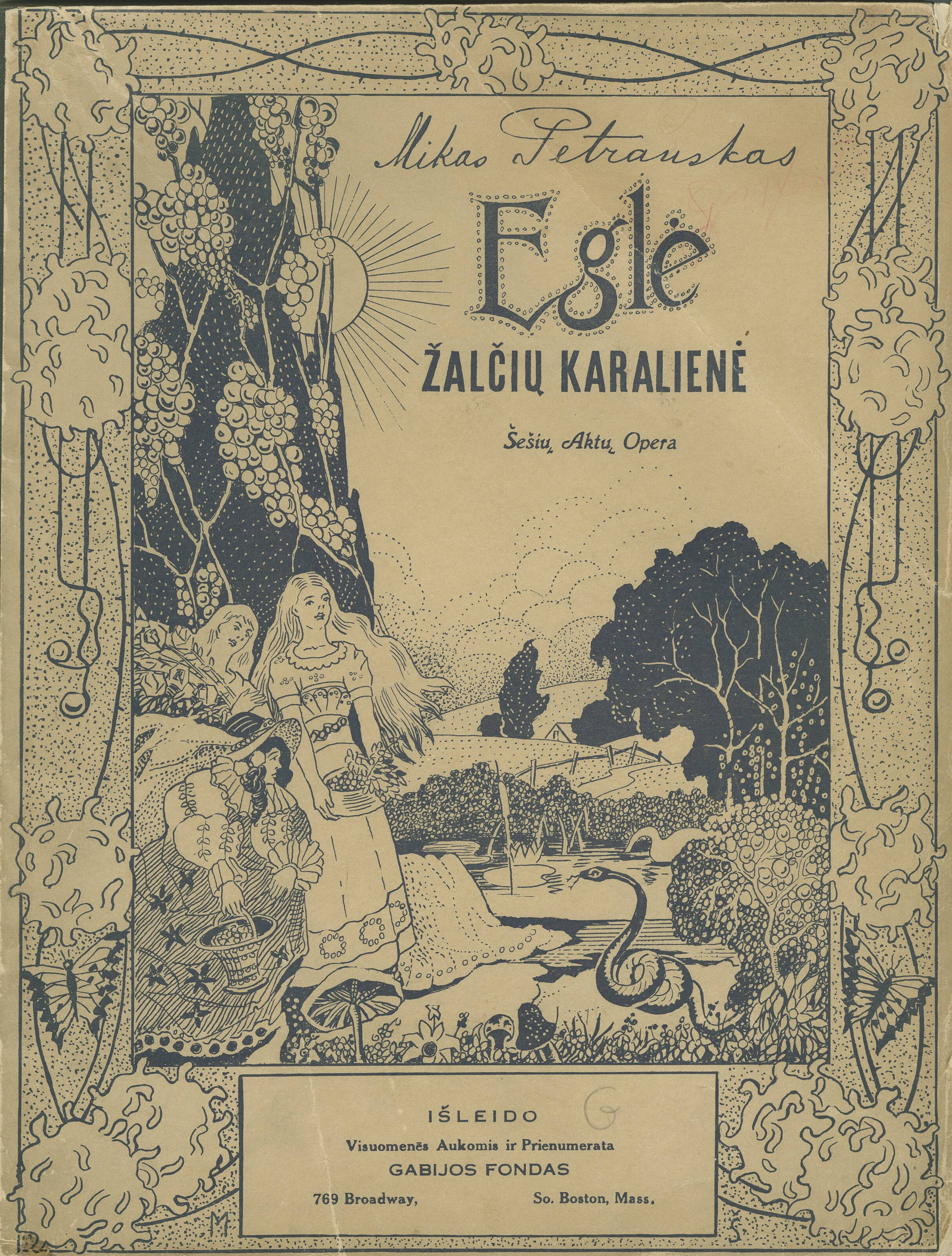
Title page of piano–vocal score for Eglė žalčių karalienė (1924)

==== Birutė ====
Staged in November 1906 in Vilnius, Birutė became the first Lithuanian-language opera. The plot is based on the medieval legend about the love between Birutė and Grand Duke of Lithuania Kęstutis recorded in the Lithuanian Chronicles. Birutė is a two-act opera similar to a singspiel. It has 12 music numbers connected by spoken dialogues. Such structure reflected realities of the amateur Lithuanian theater in 1906. The music could not be long or complex. Additionally, Petrauskas, while a graduate of the Saint Petersburg Conservatory, was not trained in composition. He composed the music in a few weeks while hiding from the Tsarist police. Therefore, the opera has hurried and amateurish components. In his study of the opera, Vytautas Landsbergis concluded that the opera is not very artistic, but is valuable for its historical significance during the Lithuanian National Revival and the early stages of the Lithuanian theatre.

==== Eglė žalčių karalienė ====
Petraukas started writing his second opera Eglė žalčių karalienė in 1910, but finished it only in 1923. It premiered on 30 May 1924 at the Grand Opera House in Boston. Petrauskas performed the main male role at the premiere. The opera is based on the Lithuanian folktale Eglė the Queen of Serpents which was developed into a five-act drama by Aleksandras Fromas-Gužutis. Petrauskas added an additional act to further explore the meeting between Eglė and her future husband Žilvinas the Serpent.

It is much more complex opera than Birutė. Petrauskas sought to create a coherent work connected by recurring themes. As an experienced songwriter, he prioritized vocals and the melody which became the most important means of expression. The opera has similarities with Russian operas. For example, the opera features abundant ceremonial choral scenes of an epic nature which are common in Russian operas. In particular, the structure of the second act is similar to the third act of Eugene Onegin by Pyotr Tchaikovsky. Overall, the opera is valued for its national spirit and sincere lyricism.

The opera, modified and adapted by the composer Jonas Dambrauskas, premiered in Kaunas on 15 February 1939 under the shortened title Eglė. It was performed 14 times.

=== Operettas ===
Operettas written by Petrauskas were:

- Kaminkrėtys ir malūnininkas (1903)
- Adomas ir Ieva (1905)
- Šienapjūtė (1910)
- Užburtas kunigaikštis (1913)
- Consilium facultatis (1915)
- Velnias išradėjas (1915)
- Tarnaitė pamokė (1915)
- Apvesdinkite ir mane (1916)
- Šventoji naktis (1917)
- Vestuvės (1917)
- Elgetos duktė – karalienė (1917)
- Girių karalius (1919)
- Pirmoji gegužės (1920)
- Vaikas ar mergaitė? (1922)
- Vargonininko vestuvės (1923)
- Prieglauda (1924)
- Lietuviškas milijonierius (1927–1928)

The first operetta was a translation of a one-act operetta by the Polish composer Franciszek Ksawery Zaremba. It became quite successful due to its plot from everyday life and simple but memorable music. Most other operettas were created when Petrauskas lived in the United States. Most librettos were created by his friends, Vincas Šlekys and Nadas Rastenis, using popular examples of other nations. Most of the plot is taken from everyday life and pokes fun at people's vices, but a few make broader societal commentaries. The music was also simple which was necessary for the Lithuanian amateur theater: basic harmony, uniform rhythms, prevailing major scale, based on simple domestic melodies.

Consilium facultatis (Meeting of Doctors) is one of Petrauskas' most popular operettas. It was performed 29 times in interwar Kaunas. It was reworked by the composer Abelis Klenickis and musicologist Stasys Yla in 1961. It was recorded for the radio and TV by the Lithuanian National Radio and Television. Petrauskas based it on a vaudeville by Aleksander Fredro which makes fun of a rich landlord and his supposed illnesses. The operetta has nine musical numbers which are generally cheerful and rather simple. It became popular due to its subtle humor, educational moral, small number of characters, melodious music.

=== Songs ===
Petrauskas wrote or harmonized more than 200 songs: over 50 songs for choirs and 169 songs for solos and duets. Of these, most valued are about 30 Lithuanian folk songs that Petrauskas perfected for mixed choirs.

Petrauskas used several different techniques when harmonizing and improving the Lithuanian folk songs. In simple couplet songs, he preserved the original melody and harmonized only the first stanza (examples: "Saulelė raudona", "Motuš motuše", "Per girelę", "Kam šėrei žirgelį", "Nusipyniau vaininkėlį"). In more complex songs, he also preserved the folk melody, but introduced variations in the texture, voice, and sometimes the harmony, enriched the choral texture with polyphonic means (examples: "Oi, motule ma", "Siuntė močiutė", "Oi, tu ieva", "Kur tas šaltinėlis").

Petrauskas also expanded some songs by using imitations, stretto, tonality (examples: "Dega ugnį", "Aš palikau motinėlę", "Gieda ryliuoja"). He was also the first to introduce choral accompaniment, especially in songs with a lively tempo (examples: "Parsivedžiau mergelę", "Suktinis", "Oi, tu ieva", "Pasėjau kanapę"). Following Russian examples, Petrauskas wrote piano accompaniment for about 100 solo and duet songs. The piano part is modest, usually only accompanying the soloist or duplicating the melody (examples: "Bernužėli, nes'voliok", "Jojau dieną", "Tykiai, tykiai Nemunėlis teka", "Kai mes augom du broliukai").

A separate group is so-called revolutionary songs written based on texts by Julius Janonis, Jonas Krikščiūnas-Jovaras, Juozas Baltrušaitis-Mėmelė, Karolis Račkauskas-Vairas that promoted freedom and love for the homeland, and encouraged rising up against the oppressors. Such songs often feature march rhythm and catchy melody that are influenced by other popular revolutionary songs (examples: "Darbininkų giesmė", "Pirmyn", ""Sutelkime kovą", "Draugai, į kovą"). Petrauskas also harmonized popular revolutionary songs "La Marseillaise", "Warszawianka", "A las Barricadas", etc. for choirs. In 1910, he published as collection of 17 revolutionary songs in Tilsit.
