= Gabrielius Landsbergis-Žemkalnis =

Lithuanian playwright (1852–1916)

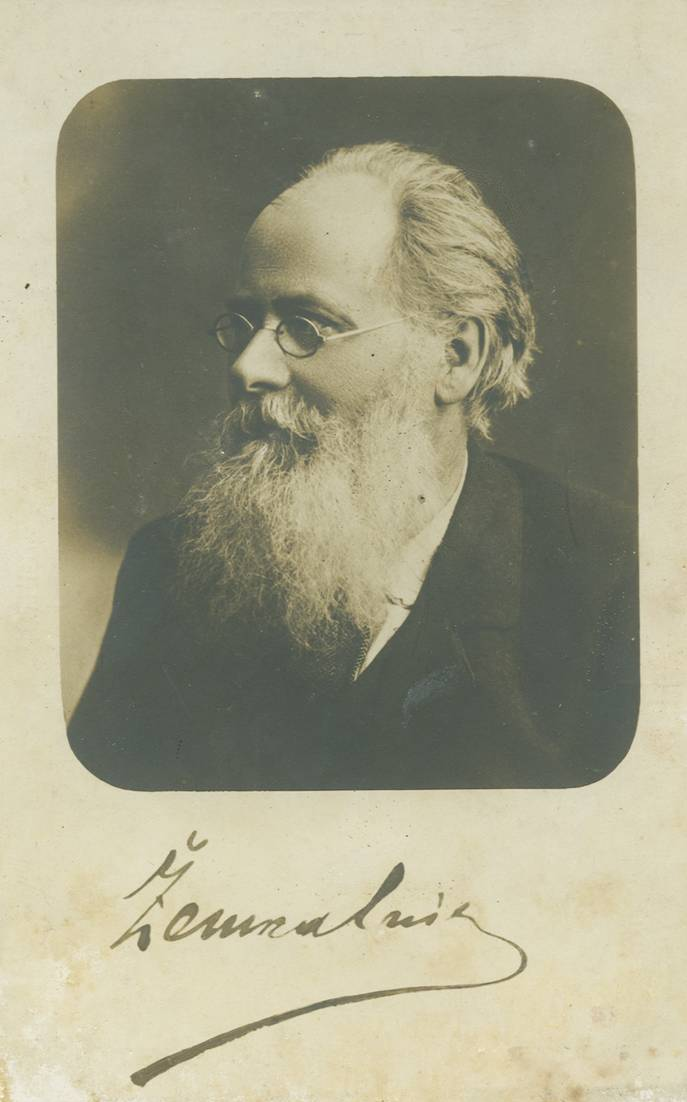
- Postcard published by the bookstore of Marija Šlapelienė
- Born: 2 February 1852; Birželiai, Russian Empire
- Died: 28 August 1916 (aged 64); Vilnius, Ober Ost
- Burial place: Rasos Cemetery
- Other names: Gabrielius Landsbergis; Gabrielius Žemkalnis
- Education: Šiauliai Gymnasium; Imperial Moscow University
- Board member of: Kanklės of Vilnius Society
- Children: Vytautas Landsbergis-Žemkalnis

Gabrielius Landsbergis-Žemkalnis (1852–1916) was a Lithuanian playwright and activists of the early Lithuanian amateur theater.

Born to an old noble family, Landsbergis attended Šiauliai Gymnasium where his friend Petras Vileišis encouraged him to speak Lithuanian and support the Lithuanian National Revival. After finishing a telegraph school in Riga in 1871, he worked at the telegraph offices in Moscow and Crimea. He returned to Lithuania in 1884 and joined the Lithuanian cultural life. He contributed articles to the illegal Lithuanian periodicals Varpas and Ūkininkas and his house was a gathering place of many Lithuanian intellectuals. Due to these activities, he was forced to leave Lithuania in 1894 but continued to maintain contacts with Lithuanian activists. He was arrested and imprisoned for ten weeks in 1900 and sentenced to two years of exile in Smolensk in 1902.

He returned in 1904 and became the administrator of Vilniaus žinios, the first legal Lithuanian daily established by Petras Vileišis. At the same time, Landsbergis devoted his energy to the Lithuanian amateur theater. He was a director, actor, playwright, critic of many of the early performances. He founded and chaired the Kanklės of Vilnius Society and was active in the Rūta Society in Vilnius, Daina Society in Kaunas, and Varpas Society in Šiauliai. All of these societies organized Lithuanian theater performances, concerts, other cultural evenings. In total, he directed or played a role in more than 130 plays. Landsbergis also wrote several plays, mostly simple comedies that were well suited for the amateur theater. His most important works were a drama about Lithuanian folk hero Tadas Blinda (1907) and melodrama about Grand Duchess Birutė (1906) which was later adapted into the first Lithuanian opera Birutė.

== Biography ==
=== Early life and education ===
Landsbergis hailed from an old German Landsberg family that traced its roots to a ministerialis who lived in 1055 at the Werden Abbey. Their last name comes the Landsberg Castle in the Duchy of Berg which translates as "land mountain". Landsbergis translated the name to Lithuanian and used Žemkalnis as his last name from around 1890.

Landsbergis was born in the family manor in Birželiai near Pumpėnai to Wincenty Landsberg and Rozalia Jasińska. His father died in 1857 leaving the family in a difficult financial situation; they relied on assistance provided by a local nobility committee. His family, including his mother, two elder brothers, and two uncles, participated in the Uprising of 1863. At the age of 10, Landsbergis moved to Mitau (Jelgava) and later attended Šiauliai Gymnasium but did not finish it. At the gymnasium, he became friends with Petras Vileišis who encouraged him to speak Lithuanian and support the Lithuanian National Revival. In 1870–1871, he studied at a telegraph school in Riga and got a job at the telegraph in Moscow in 1871. At the same time, he studied at the Imperial Moscow University and passed exams to become a lawyer.

In 1878, he moved to Crimea, where he was a director of a telegraph station in Alupka. In 1884, he returned to Lithuania and lived in Joniškėlis and Linkavičiai village near Linkuva supervising the estates of the Karp family. There he became acquainted with Gabrielė Petkevičaitė-Bitė (his first wife in 1879–1880 was her cousin) and started contributing articles to Varpas and Ūkininkas – Lithuanian periodicals which were illegal in the Russian Empire due to the Lithuanian press ban. He contributed about 50 articles and correspondences on issues of the Lithuanian language in public life, relations of Lithuanians and other nationalities, Polonized Lithuanian nobility, education. Landsbergis' house became a meeting place of various Lithuanian intellectuals, including Vincas Kudirka, Jonas Jablonskis, Liudas Vaineikis, Antanas Kriščiukaitis, Jurgis Bielinis. In 1894, Pranas Mašiotas married Landsbergis' niece Marija Jasienskytė.

=== Theater activist ===
In 1894, due to suspicions that he was involved in the Lithuanian book smuggling, Landsbergis was forced to leave Lithuania. He lived in Moscow and worked as an inspector of the 1st City Hospital. He continued to maintain contacts with various Lithuanian activists, including with Jonas Basanavičius and Juozas Tumas-Vaižgantas. He visited Lithuania in summer 1900 when Lithuanian activists wanted to host further Lithuanian theater performances after the successful staging of America in the Bathhouse in 1899. Tsarist police launched an investigation into activists connected with Liudas Vaineikis and Landsbergis was arrested on 6 October 1900 and sent to a prison in Liepāja for ten weeks. According to his son's memoirs, he was released because his family managed to bribe Russian policemen, but he lost his job in Moscow. On 27 February 1902, Tsar Nicholas II of Russia signed the order sentencing 24 Lithuanians to various terms of exile. Landsbergis was sentenced to two years of exile in Smolensk.

Landbsbergis returned to Lithuania in March 1904 and settled in Vilnius. The Lithuanian press ban was lifted that spring and Landsbergis worked helping Petras Vileišis organize a Lithuanian printing press, bookstore, and the daily Vilniaus žinios. He was an administrator of the daily until 1908. During the Russian Revolution of 1905, together with others, Landsbergis organized the Great Seimas of Vilnius which resolved to seek autonomy for Lithuania in the Russian Empire. He was also active in the Lithuanian cultural life in Vilnius. He was one of the founders of the Lithuanian Mutual Relief Society of Vilnius and the Lithuanian Scientific Society. He was also elected chairman of the illegal Union of Lithuanian Teachers (the meeting took place in his apartment in December 1905) and later raised funds to pay for the Lithuanian language lessons at city schools.

He was most active in the Lithuanian amateur theater. He performed various roles – director, actor, playwright, critic. He founded and chaired Kanklės of Vilnius Society which was active in 1905–1908 and organized various theater performances, concerts, cultural evenings. The largest production was the first national Lithuanian opera Birutė which was adapted by the composer Mikas Petrauskas from a drama written by Landsbergis. In 1908–1909, he lived in Kaunas and was active in the Daina Society. He then moved to Šiauliai where he worked as an inspector of an insurance company and staged about 50 plays with Varpas Society. Among the plays staged by Landsbergis were Pilėnų kunigaikštis by Marcelinas Šikšnys (1906), Mindaugas by Juliusz Słowacki (1908), Du keliu by Herman Heijermans (1913). In April 1915, Landsbergis evacuated from Šiauliai and returned to Vilnius where he organized cultural evenings on behalf of the Lithuanian Society for the Relief of War Sufferers. His last play was staged on 26 June 1916. However, Landsbergis was of poor health and he died on 28 August 1916 in Vilnius and was buried in Rasos Cemetery.

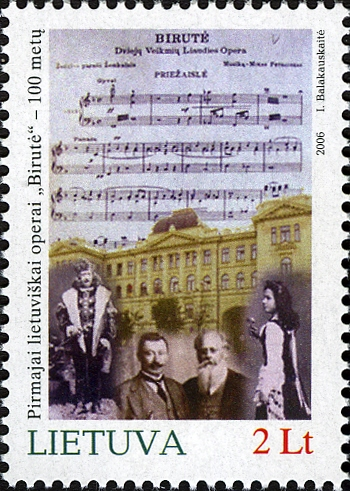
2006 postal stamp for the 100th anniversary of opera Birutė

== Works ==
While living in Russia, Landsbergis published a few small didactic prose works for children. Landsbergis reworked a ballad by Silvestras Teofilis Valiūnas about Grand Duchess Birutė into a melodrama which was staged and published in 1906. Composer Mikas Petrauskas adapted it into the first national Lithuanian opera Birutė. Landsbergis' most important work was drama Blinda, svieto lygintojas (Blinda, the Leveller of the World) which he wrote based on materials about Tadas Blinda collected by Lazdynų Pelėda. The drama was staged in 1907 and published in 1908. It became very popular and elevated Blinda to the Lithuanian folk heroes. The drama explored social and class conflicts between Lithuanians, Polish nobility, and Russian officials and reflected revolutionary moods of 1905–1907.

In 1908, he published three simple comedies suited for the Lithuanian amateur theater of the time – Pagavo! (Caught!), Jurgis Durnelis (Jurgis the Fool), Tarnaitė pamokė (Maid Taught). In 1913, he published monologue Blaivininkų pirmininkas (Chairman of the Teetotalers). His works were popular as they featured comic situations and lively dialogues, but the characters were not well developed and their motivations were not fleshed out. Landsbergis' works also tended to be didactic.

In 1914, he prepared a new version of Genovefa by Christoph von Schmid (which is based on the legend of Genevieve of Brabant) for stage – he simplified the plot, reduced the number of acts from eight to four, and reduced overly religious imagery. In the adapted play, Landsbergis focuses on Golo who, based on the Romantic German tradition, becomes a tragic character and not a black-and-white villain.

Many of Landsbergis' documents and manuscripts were lost during World War I in a fire in Šiauliai. His collected works were published in 1972.
