= Teisutis Makačinas =

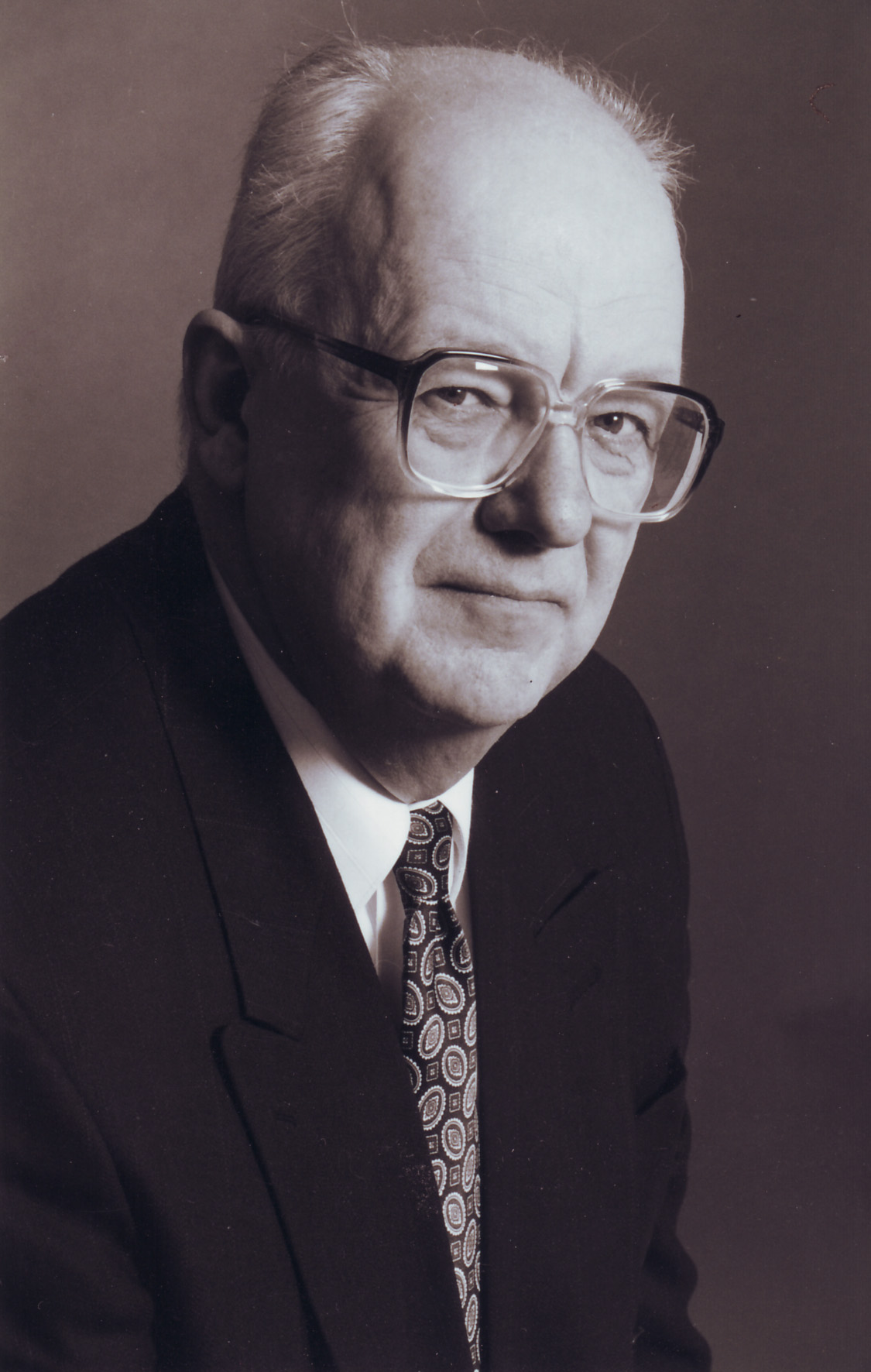
- Makačinas in 2015

Background information
- Birth name: Teisutis Antano Makačinas
- Born: 5 September 1938 (age 86); Kaunas, Lithuania
- Origin: Lithuania
- Genres: classic, disco, electronic
- Occupation(s): songwriter, composer
- Instrument(s): vocals, piano
- Years active: 1959–present

Teisutis Makačinas (born 5 September 1938) is a Lithuanian songwriter, composer and professor.

== Biography ==
Teisutis Makačinas was born in Kaunas. In 1946–1947, Makačinas studied at Vilnius Primary School, 1947–1951 at Panevėžys 1st Secondary School, 1951–1956 at Vilnius 7th Secondary School, at 1951–1956 Vilnius Juozas Tallat-Kelpša Music School. In 1956–1961, Makačinas attended the composition class of Julius Juzeliūnas of the LSSR Conservatory. Since 1959, Teisutis Makačinas is a lecturer at Vilnius Juozas Tallat-Kelpša Music School, 1973–2001 head of the Department of Music Theory and Composition. 1961–1967 was a lecturer in the LSSR Conservatory. Since 1985 Makačinas has been Associate Professor, 2012–2020 President of the Lithuanian Copyright Protection Association (LATGA). Member of the Lithuanian Composers' Union.
