= Elena Žalinkevičaitė-Petrauskienė =

Lithuanian actress and writer (1900–1986)

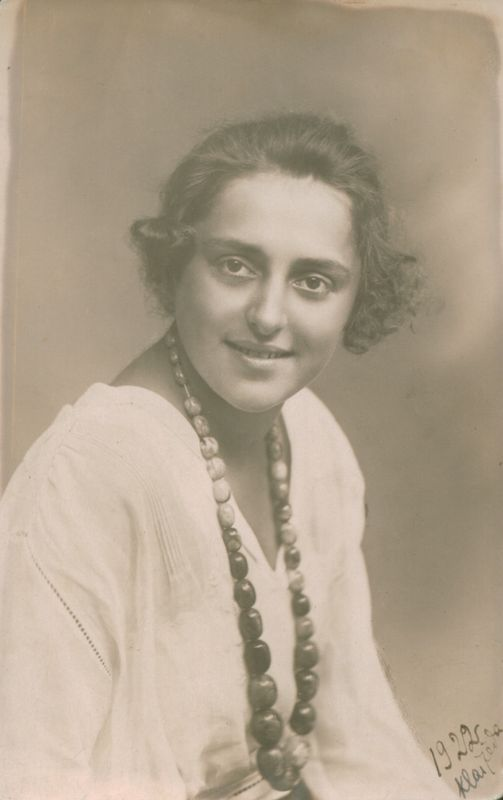
- Žalinkevičaitė-Petrauskienė in 1922
- Born: September 23, 1900; Padustėlis, Dusetos Parish, Russian Empire
- Died: May 23, 1986 (aged 85); Vilnius, Lithuanian SSR
- Education: Petrov Ballet Studio
- Occupations: Actor, writer
- Spouse: Kipras Petrauskas
- Children: Guoda Petrauskaitė; Aušra Petrauskaitė; Leo Petrauskas

Elena Žalinkevičaitė-Petrauskienė (September 23, 1900 – May 23, 1986) was a Lithuanian actress and writer. She was also the Lithuanian tenor Kipras Petrauskas's wife. In 1942, her husband was asked to hide a Jewish baby girl, Dana Pomeranz, which she and he agreed to. To hide the girl better, Elena and her husband left the city, moving first to a Lithuanian village, and later to Austria and then Germany. In 1947, they came back to Lithuania, and they found Dana's parents and gave her back to them.

In 1999, Elena and her husband were recognized by Yad Vashem as two of the Righteous Among the Nations.
