= Palūšė =

- Village
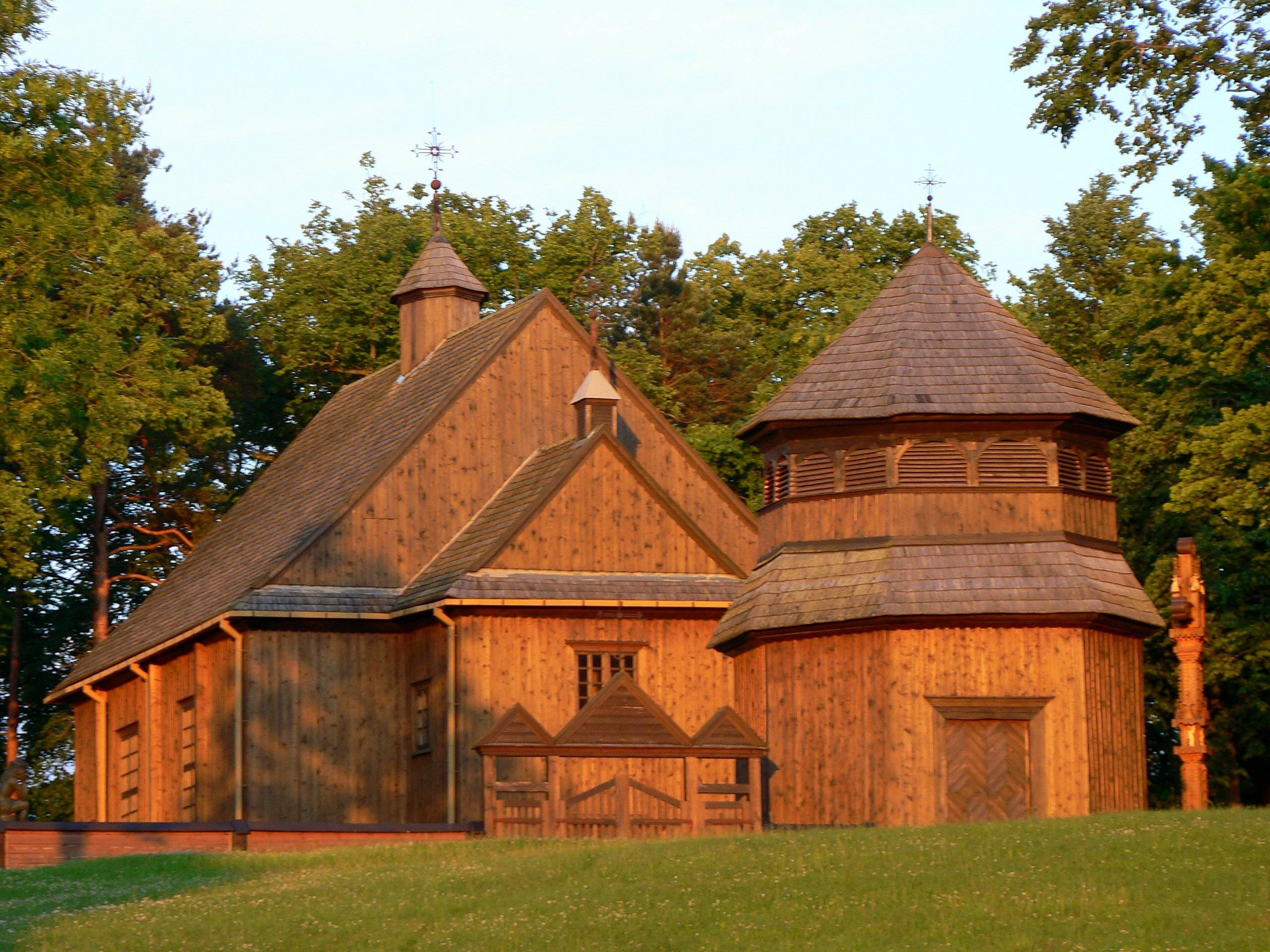
- 18th-century wooden church in Palūšė
- Interactive map of Palūšė
- Location of Palūšė
- Coordinates: 55°20′N 26°06′E
- Country: Lithuania
- Ethnographic region: Aukštaitija
- County: Utena County
- Municipality: Ignalina municipality
- Eldership: Ignalina eldership
- First mentioned: 1651

Population (2011)
  - Total: 83
- Time zone: UTC+2 (EET)
  - Summer (DST): UTC+3 (EEST)

Palūšė is a tourist village in the Aukštaitija National Park in eastern Lithuania. It is located south-west of Ignalina. The church of Palūšė, built in 1750, is considered to be one of the oldest surviving wooden churches in Lithuania. The church is constructed from wood and was built without using nails, only with saws and axes. It was featured on the one litas banknote. According to the 2011 census, it had 83 residents. Lithuania singer and composer Mikas Petrauskas was born in Palūšė.

== Tourism ==
Palūšė is a prominent tourism centre within Aukštaitija National Park. Although the village had only 83 residents according to the 2011 census, it attracts significantly larger numbers of visitors due to its location on the shores of Lake Lūšiai, the largest lake in the park. During the 2023 summer season, the Palūšė area was estimated to receive approximately 12,000 tourists. The Aukštaitija National Park Visitor Center in the village recorded nearly 4,800 visits in 2024 , with international visitors accounting for about 29 percent of total attendance.

Tourism in Palūšė is primarily based on nature and water recreation. The lake serves as a starting point for canoeing and kayaking routes through the interconnected lake system of the park. The village is also known for the 18th-century wooden Church of St. Joseph, Palūšė. Accommodation services, campsites and marked hiking and cycling trails support sustainable rural and eco-tourism development in the area.

== Geography ==
The village is located on the eastern shore of Lake Lūšiai, 6 km west from the district center, the town of Ignalina.

== Notable people ==
- Mikas Petrauskas (1873-1937), a Lithuanian organist, singer (tenor), conductor, and teacher.
