= Kipras Petrauskas =

Lithuanian tenor (1885–1968)

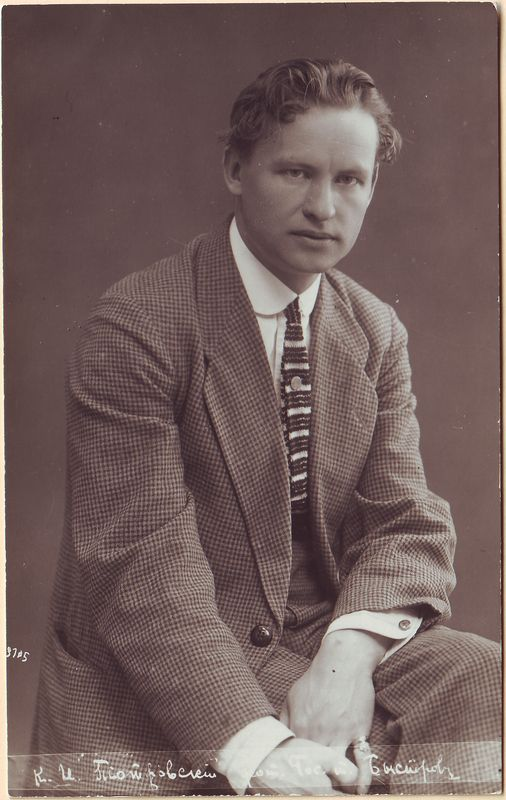
- Kipras Petrauskas, c. 1920s
- Born: Ciprijonas Petrauskas; 5 December 1885; Ceikiniai, Russian Empire
- Died: 17 January 1968 (aged 82); Vilnius, Lithuanian SSR
- Education: Saint Petersburg Conservatory
- Occupation: Operatic tenor
- Years active: 1911–1958
- Spouse: Elena Žalinkevičaitė-Petrauskienė
- Children: Leonas "Luka" Petrauskas; Guoda Petrauskaitė; Aušra Petrauskaitė
- Parent(s): Jonas Petrauskas; Juozapota Rastenytė

Ciprijonas "Kipras" Petrauskas (5 December 1885 – 17 January 1968) was a Lithuanian and Soviet operatic tenor (created around 80 roles), professor, and member of the Lithuanian Association of Artists. The national opera foundation is associated with him.

== Biography ==
Petrauskas was married to Elena Žalinkevičaitė-Petrauskienė.

Petrauskas was a supporter of the Lithuania men's national basketball team as in 1937, following the final victory over Italy in the EuroBasket 1937, he interrupted his performance at the State Theatre in Kaunas to announce the Lithuania's victory, while the crowd then rose to their feet and together sang the Lithuanian anthem.

In 1942, he was asked to hide a Jewish baby girl, Dana Pomeranz, which he and his wife agreed to do. To hide the girl better, he and his wife left the city, moving first to a Lithuanian village, and later to Austria and then Germany. In 1947, they came back to Lithuania, found Dana's parents, and gave her back to them. In 1999, Petrauskas and his wife were recognized by Yad Vashem as two of the Righteous Among the Nations.

Kipras Petrauskas made his first recordings for Vox (Berlin 1922), then Odeon (1926 and 1928) and finally Columbia (Vilnius, ca. 1933).

== Gallery ==
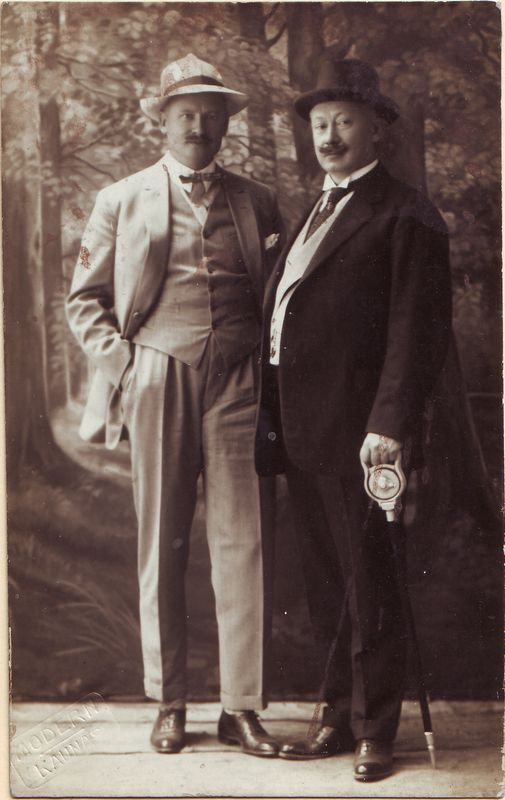
Kipras Petrauskas with his brother Mikas Petrauskas in the 1930s

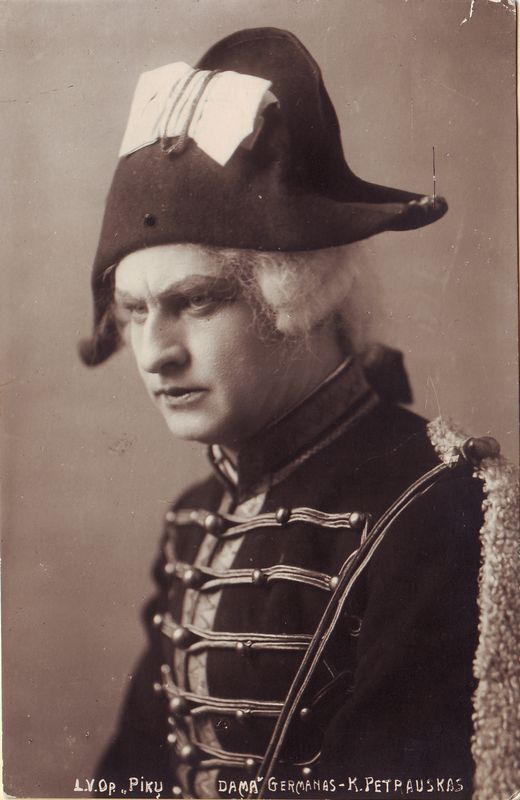
Petrauskas performing the Teuton role

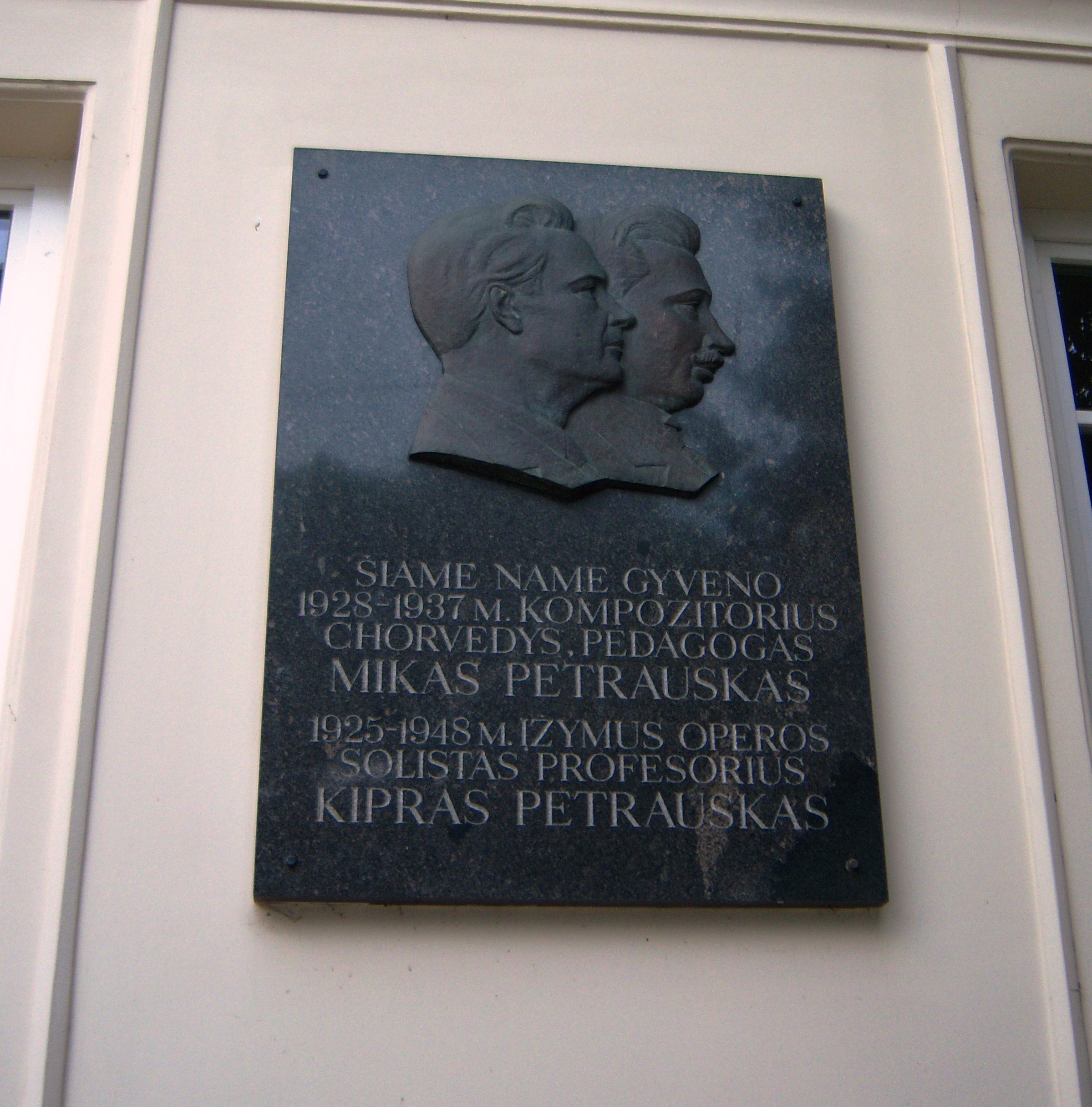
Memorial plaque to brothers Kipras and Mikas Petrauskas in Kaunas, Lithuania
