= Antanas Smetona =

1st President of Lithuania (1919–1920, 1926–1940)

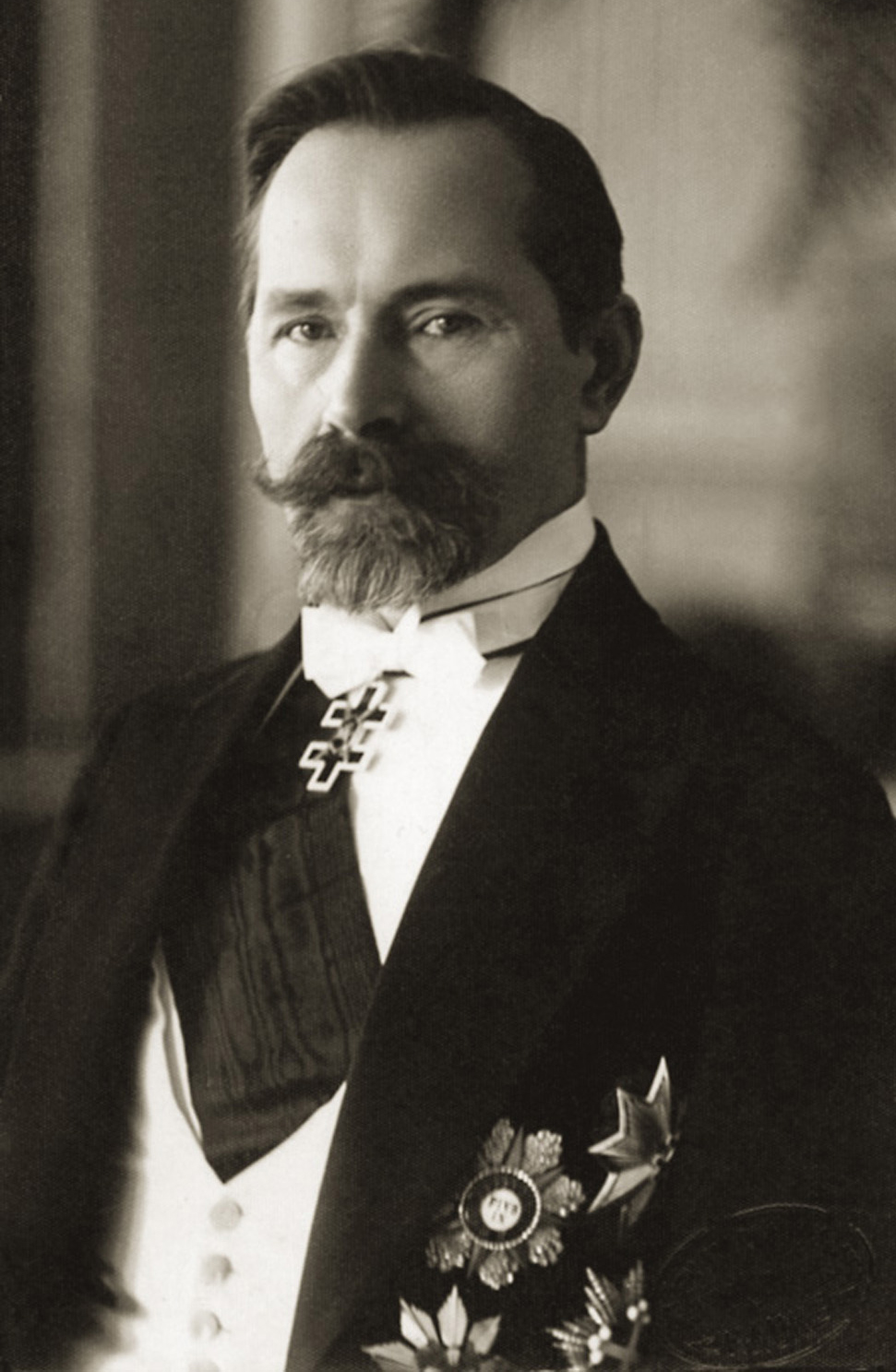

1st President of Lithuania
- In office 19 December 1926 – 15 June 1940
- Prime Minister: Augustinas Voldemaras; Juozas Tūbelis; Vladas Mironas; Jonas Černius; Antanas Merkys
- Preceded by: Aleksandras Stulginskis (acting)
- Succeeded by: Antanas Merkys (acting, de facto) Vytautas Landsbergis (in 1990, as Chairman of the Supreme Council)
- In office 4 April 1919 – 19 June 1920
- Prime Minister: Pranas Dovydaitis; Mykolas Sleževičius; Ernestas Galvanauskas
- Succeeded by: Aleksandras Stulginskis

1st Chairman of the Council of Lithuania
- In office 23 September 1917 – 4 April 1919
- Preceded by: Office established
- Succeeded by: Stasys Šilingas

Personal details
- Born: 10 August 1874 Užulėnis, Kovno Governorate, Russian Empire
- Died: 9 January 1944 (aged 69) Cleveland, Ohio, U.S.
- Resting place: All Souls Cemetery, Chardon, Ohio
- Party: Lithuanian Democratic Party (1902–1907); Party of National Progress (before 1924); Lithuanian Nationalist Union (1924–1940)
- Spouse: Sofija Chodakauskaitė-Smetonienė (1885–1968)
- Children: Marija Danutė (1905–1992); Birutė (1906–1909); Julius Rimgaudas (1913–1974)
- Education: University of Saint Petersburg

Antanas Smetona (Lithuanian: [ɐnˈtǎːnɐs sʲmʲɛtoːˈnɐ]; 10 August 1874 – 9 January 1944) was a Lithuanian intellectual, journalist, and politician. He served as the first president of Lithuania from 1919 to 1920 and later as the authoritarian head of state from 1926 until the Soviet occupation of Lithuania in 1940. Referred to as the "Leader of the Nation" during his presidency, Smetona is recognised as one of the most important Lithuanian political figures between World War I and World War II, and a prominent ideologist of Lithuanian nationalism and the movement for national revival.

Born into a farming family in the village of Užulėnis, Kovno Governorate, Smetona exhibited a strong interest in education and Lithuanian cultural identity from an early age. He attended Palanga Progymnasium and later graduated from Jelgava Gymnasium. He pursued higher education at the Saint Petersburg Imperial University, where he studied law and became involved in nationalist and cultural movements. During this time, he contributed to the Lithuanian press, advocating for national self-determination and the preservation of Lithuanian culture under Russian imperial rule. After completing his studies, he worked as a teacher and journalist, eventually becoming one of the key intellectual leaders of the Lithuanian National Revival.

The Russian Revolution of 1917 and the subsequent collapse of the Russian Empire provided a pivotal opportunity for Smetona and other Lithuanian leaders to pursue national independence. As a member of the Council of Lithuania, he was instrumental in the drafting and signing of the Act of Independence on 16 February 1918, which proclaimed the restoration of an independent Lithuania. During the interwar period, Smetona emerged as a prominent political figure, serving as the first President and later taking power in a coup d'état in 1926. Under his leadership, Lithuania pursued a policy of neutrality and underwent significant economic and cultural development, despite the challenges posed by regional instability and the rise of authoritarian regimes in Europe.

After the Soviet Union occupied Lithuania in 1940, Smetona fled to Germany and later to the United States, where he lived in exile until his death in Cleveland, Ohio, in 1944. His legacy remains a topic of debate among historians. While some view him as a pivotal figure in the establishment of Lithuanian independence and the promotion of national identity, others criticize his authoritarian rule and suppression of political opposition.

== Early life and education ==
Smetona was born on 10 August [O.S. 29 July] 1874 in the village of Užulėnis, Kovno Governorate, Russian Empire, to a family of farmers, Jonas Smetona and Julijona Kartanaitė – former serfs of the Taujėnai Manor, which belonged to the Radziwiłł family. Researcher Kazimieras Gasparavičius has traced Smetona's patrilineal ancestry to Laurentijus, who was born around 1695 and lived near Raguva. Smetona was the eighth of nine children. His parents were hardworking people who managed to double their inherited 5 hectares (12 acres). His father was literate and Smetona learned to read at home.

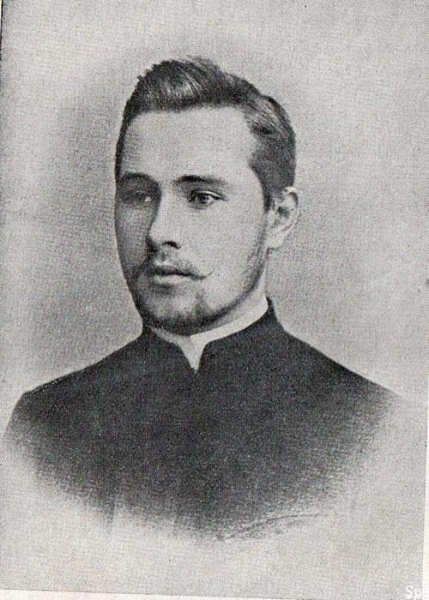
Smetona as a student of the university's Faculty of Law

Smetona's father died in 1885 when Smetona was only 11 years old and, despite financial difficulties, a year later Smetona – the only of his siblings – was sent to the primary school in Taujėnai, where instruction was in Russian due to the Lithuanian press ban. This was his dying father's request. His mother hoped that Smetona would become a priest. After graduation in 1889, Smetona wanted to continue his education, but gymnasiums admitted pupils only up to the age of 12 and he was already 15 years old. Therefore, he was forced to study privately in Ukmergė in order to catch up and be able to pass examinations to enter the fourth class of gymnasium. In summer 1891, he attempted to gain admission to the Liepāja Gymnasium as his brother Motiejus worked in a factory in Liepāja. He was refused and instead applied to the Palanga Progymnasium, which had no age restrictions. Smetona was an exemplary student (one of the top two students) and received a tuition waiver. As a superintendent of a student dormitory, he also received free housing and was able to support himself by providing private lessons. Three other future signatories of the Act of Independence of Lithuania attended the progymnasium at the same time: Steponas Kairys, Jurgis Šaulys, and Kazimieras Steponas Šaulys. As Palanga was close to East Prussia, it was easier to obtain Lithuanian literature, which was banned by the Tsarist authorities. Smetona began reading Lithuanian periodicals and books, including a history of Lithuania by Maironis.

After graduating in 1893, according to his family's wishes, he passed his entrance examinations for the Samogitian Diocesan Seminary in Kaunas. However, he felt no great calling for priesthood and enrolled at the Jelgava Gymnasium in Latvia. This was a cultural hub of the Lithuanian National Revival and attracted many future leaders in Lithuanian culture and politics, including Juozas Tūbelis and Vladas Mironas, who later became Smetona's political companions. In particular, Lithuanian language and culture was openly promoted by the linguist, Jonas Jablonskis, teacher of Greek, with whom Smetona developed a close professional relationship. Jablonskis visited Smetona's native village collecting data on Lithuanian dialects. Smetona met his future wife, Sofija Chodakauskaitė, through Jablonskis, who recommended him as a tutor for her brother.

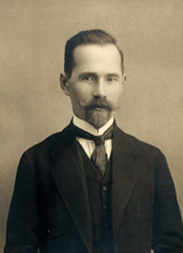
Smetona's portrait taken in Vilnius before World War I

In autumn 1896, the administration of the Jelgava Gymnasium forced Lithuanian students to recite their prayers in Russian while Latvian and German students were allowed to use their native languages. Smetona and other students refused and were expelled. Most later agreed to pray in Russian and were re-admitted, but a handful who refused were prohibited from attending any other school. The students sent petitions to Pope Leo XIII and Ivan Delyanov, Minister of National Education. Smetona and two others, Jurgis Šlapelis and Petras Vaiciuška, managed to secure an audience with Delyanov, who allowed the Lithuanians to pray in Latin and the expelled students to continue their education. Smetona did not return to Jelgava and finished up at Gymnasium No. 9 in Saint Petersburg.

Upon graduation in 1897, Smetona entered the faculty of law of the University of Saint Petersburg. He was more interested in history and languages, but knew that as a Catholic, his choices were limited to priest, lawyer, or doctor if he wanted to work in Lithuania. Saint Petersburg, with a direct railway connection to Lithuania, was becoming a Lithuanian cultural center. Smetona joined and chaired a secret Lithuanian student organization. He was later succeeded by Steponas Kairys. He also joined a Lithuanian choir led by Česlovas Sasnauskas, organist at the Church of St. Catherine. Smetona was exposed to socialist ideas and even read Marx's Capital, but resolutely rejected them. He was expelled from the university, imprisoned for two weeks, and deported to Vilnius for participating in the February 1899 student protests. It was the first time Smetona had visited the city, the historical capital of the Grand Duchy of Lithuania, and it left a deep impression on him. A month later, he was allowed to return to the university.

In 1898, Smetona and his roommate, Vladas Sirutavičius, using a mimeograph, printed about 100 copies of a brief Lithuanian grammar book written by Petras Avižonis based on the German-language writings of Friedrich Kurschat. This grammar book was insufficient for Lithuanian needs and in summer 1900, Jonas Jablonskis set to work on his Lithuanian grammar. He was assisted by Avižonis, Žemaitė, and Smetona, though Smetona mostly edited works of Bishop Motiejus Valančius. The grammar book was published in 1901 and became a fundamental work in establishing the standard Lithuanian language. In early 1902, the police began investigating a network of Lithuanian book smugglers and raided Smetona's room, where they found several prohibited Lithuanian publications. He was imprisoned in Vyborg Castle, but managed to secure acquittal and graduate that spring.

== Early activities ==
After his graduation from university in 1902, he moved to Vilnius and worked at the Vilnius Land Bank until 1915. He became an active participant in Lithuanian cultural life and, up until becoming president in December 1926, devoted substantial amounts of time and effort to the Lithuanian press. Two years later, he married Sofija Chodakauskaitė in the Church of St. Raphael the Archangel in Vilnius.

From his very first days in Vilnius, Smetona became involved in the activities of various Lithuanian nationalist groups, and joined the Lithuanian Democratic Party, which he represented in the Great Seimas of Vilnius. He was later elected to its Presidium. In 1904 and 1907, he was on the staff of the Lithuanian newspaper, Vilniaus žinios (The Vilnius News). In 1905–1906, he edited the weekly Lietuvos ūkininkas (The Lithuanian Farmer). In 1907, Smetona and the Rev. Juozas Tumas-Vaižgantas established a venture to print the newspaper Viltis (The Hope), and started publishing and circulating it. In Viltis, Smetona advocated national unity. He was also one of the incorporators of the Aušra (Dawn) company for the publishing of Lithuanian books, a member of the Lithuanian Mutual Aid Society of Vilnius, the Lithuanian Learned Society, the Vilniaus aušra (The Dawn of Vilnius), and Rytas (The Morning) education societies, the Rūta Art Society and many other societies, and taught the Lithuanian language at Vilnius schools. In 1914, he started publishing Vairas (The Rudder), a new bi-weekly magazine.

== Politics ==
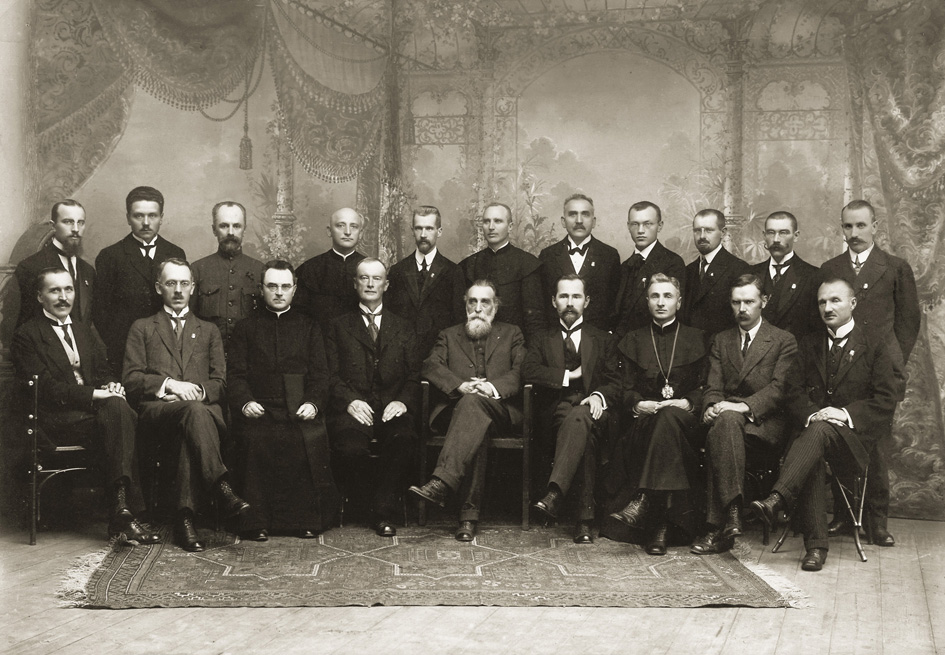
Smetona (first right from center) in the Council of Lithuania

During the First World War, he was the first vice-chairman, and later chairman, of the Central Committee of the Lithuanian Society for the Relief of War Sufferers. In the summer of 1916, Antanas Smetona, together with other Lithuanians from Vilnius, presented a memorandum to the German Commander-in-Chief of the Eastern Front, in which they demanded the right of the Lithuanian nation to have an independent State. On 6 September 1917, he started printing the newspaper, Lietuvos Aidas (Lithuania's Echo), working as its publisher and its editor-in-chief. In the first issue of the newspaper, Smetona wrote that the most important goal of the Lithuanian nation was the re-establishment of an independent Lithuanian state.

Between 18 and 22 September 1917, he participated in the Lithuanian Conference in Vilnius, and was elected chairman (1917–1919) of the Council of Lithuania (later Council of the State). On 16 February 1918, Antanas Smetona signed the Act of Independence of Lithuania.

Between December 1918 and March 1919, he lived primarily in Germany and the Scandinavian countries, soliciting loans for the cause of Lithuanian independence. On 4 April 1919, the State Council of Lithuania elected Smetona the first president of the Republic of Lithuania. On 19 April 1920, the Constituent Assembly elected Aleksandras Stulginskis President. Not re-elected to Seimas, from 1921 to 1924, he edited several periodicals, including Lietuvos balsas, Lietuviškas balsas, and Vairas.

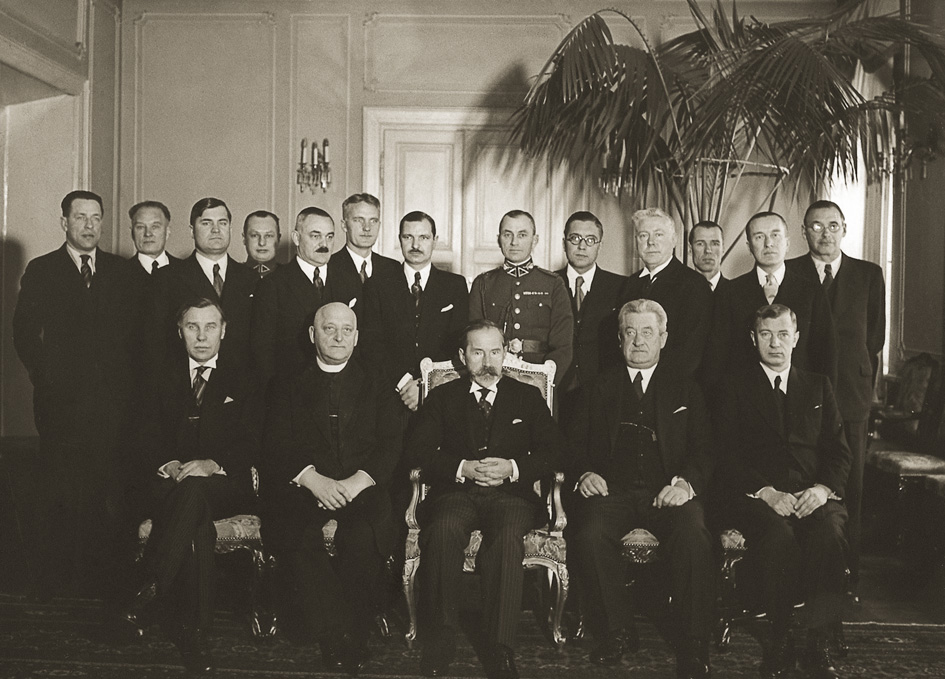
Smetona (center) with ministers

After the Klaipėda Revolt of January 1923, in the Memelland, which had been separated from Germany, he was made commissioner there on 20 February, but, due to disagreements with Prime Minister Ernestas Galvanauskas, he resigned from his post.

In November 1923, authorities imprisoned Smetona for several days for publishing an article by Augustinas Voldemaras in Vairas. Between 1923 and 1927, he was an assistant professor at the University of Lithuania – at first in the chair of art theory and history and later at the department of philosophy. He lectured on ethics, ancient philosophy, and Lithuanian linguistics. In 1932, he was awarded an honorary Ph.D. at the Vytautas Magnus University.

Smetona participated in the activity of the Lithuanian Riflemen's Union that had staged the Klaipėda Revolt, which gave him greater name-recognition. More than once, he was elected to its central board. Between 1924 and 1940, he was the vice-chairman of the board of the International Bank.

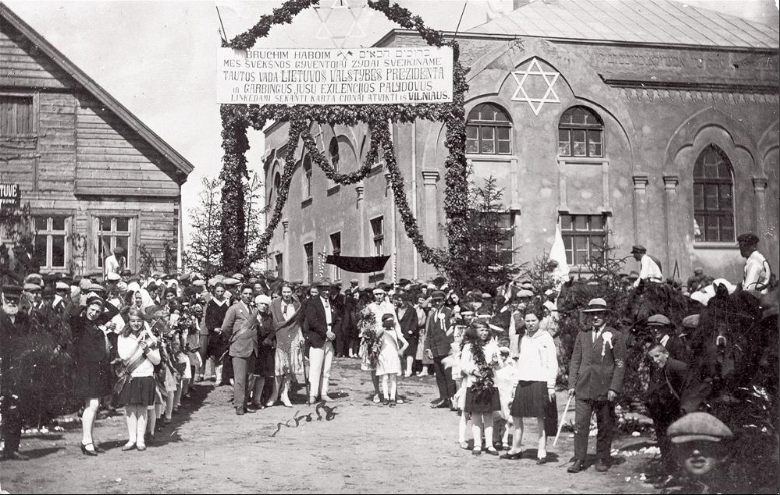
Lithuanian Jews in Švėkšna welcoming Lithuanian President Smetona and his companions under a Lithuanian and Hebrew languages banner and wishing to next time come from Vilnius (1928)

Smetona was known for his tolerant stance towards Jews and his radical opponents nicknamed him as "Jewish King". Under Smetona's rule in Lithuania, not a single anti-Jewish law was passed and high-ranking Lithuanian officials, including ministers, did not publicly say anti-Jewish statements. Smetona considered Jews not as foreigners, but as Lithuanian citizens of foreign nationality and himself acted against antisemitic acts with his statements which were later followed by actions of governmental institutions (e.g. censorship). The Lithuanian courts, war commandants, and Lithuanian Police Force severely punished the participants of anti-Jewish physical attacks or smashing of Jews windows (the culprits were punished with fines, imprisoned, or even sent to hard labor prisons). Moreover, the Government of Lithuania also did not tolerate anti-Jewish attacks and severely punished their participants, especially activists. Consequently, Jews were widely sympathetic towards Smetona and his rule. However, his regime did not tolerate insults of the German government and actively repressed suspected communists. For example, in 1934, the Ministry of National Defence of Lithuania approved an order to the counties commandants to "severely punish all those who insult the German Government in any way, as well as those who deliberately agitate against Lithuanian Jews; to suppress the activity of all those Jewish organizations which appear to be under Communist cover or succumb to Communist influence".

=== Authoritarian president ===
"The Poles stole Lithuanian history, now the Russians are trying to steal it, we have to catch those thieves by the hand and show them in a real light to the entire world."

— Antanas Smetona.

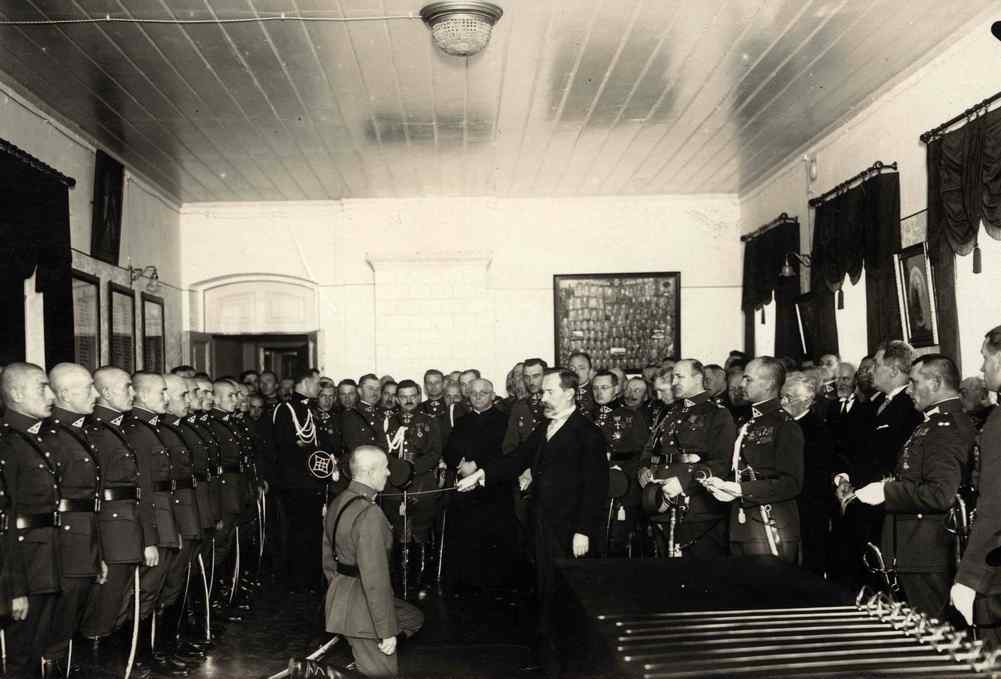
Smetona initiating soldiers to the Lithuanian Armed Forces

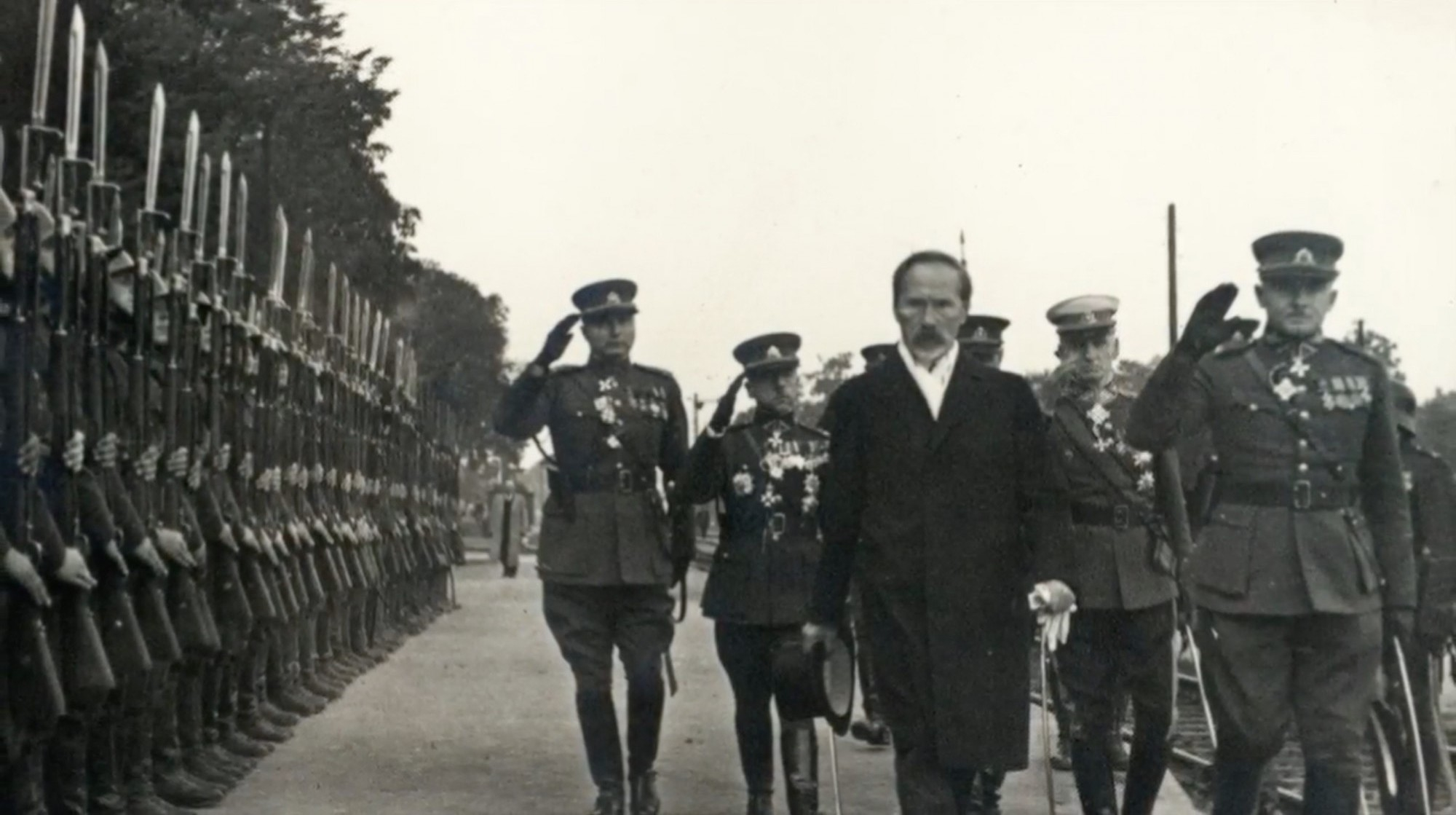
Smetona inspects the Lithuanian Armed Forces soldiers

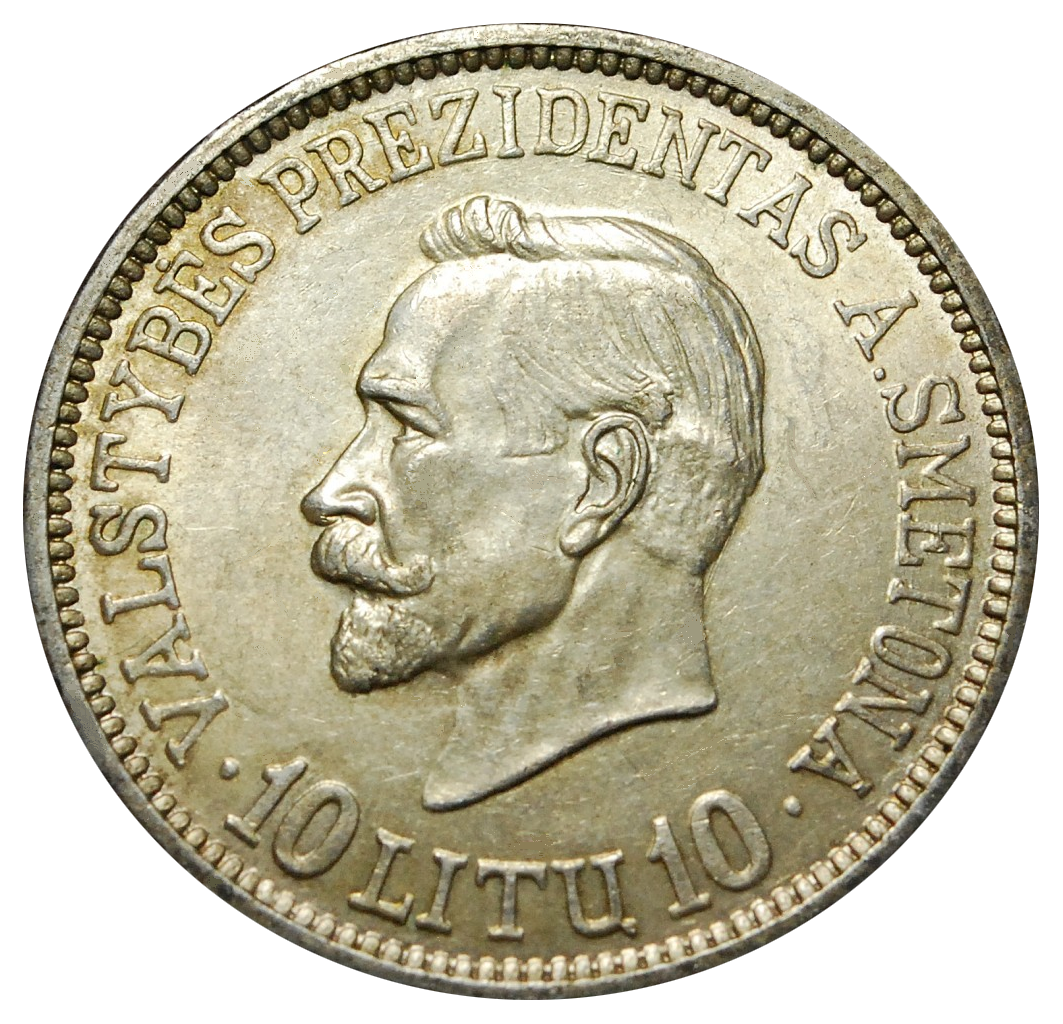
Interwar 10 litas coin featuring President Smetona by pre-war sculptor Juozas Zikaras

Smetona was a leader of the 1926 coup d'état that deposed President Kazys Grinius. He once again became president on 19 December that year (two others briefly held the office during the coup, which began on 17 December, before Smetona was formally restored to the presidency). He designated Augustinas Voldemaras as prime minister. One year later, he dissolved parliament, and on 15 May 1928, with the approval of the government, he promulgated a new constitution with more extensive presidential powers. In 1929, he removed Voldemaras and assumed dictatorial powers. He was re-elected president in 1931 and 1938, both times as the sole candidate. He remained in office until 15 June 1940.

Smetona's constitution vested the president with both executive and legislative powers when the Seimas was not in session. The Seimas was not reconvened until the 1936 Lithuanian parliamentary election; for the next decade, Smetona ruled by decree, without a parliament, which made his regime on paper one of the most arbitrary in the world. Even when the Seimas was reconvened, it was composed entirely of Smetona's adherents; Smetona thus effectively retained all governing power in the nation. In 1938, a third constitution was enacted that retained the general authoritarian character of the 1928 document, and declared that political power in the state was "indivisible."

The regime repeatedly arrested and imprisoned members of the already-banned Communist Party – as with almost all interwar European dictatorships, the claimed threat of Communism was the source of its legitimacy and the regime executed the original leadership five days after coming to power. However, despite propaganda that Communists were a "non-Lithuanian force invading the country", they continued to operate underground with growing membership and it is known today that their leaders were ethnically Lithuanian.

In 1935, Smetona suffered a blow when farmers in southeastern Lithuania organised a strike and refused to sell their products. Reprisals led to five deaths and 456 farmers being arrested, which exacerbated long-standing tensions within his regime between hardliners, who argued for more rigid authoritarian control over Lithuanian life, and moderates, who wanted liberalism. The difficulties, however, were already becoming overshadowed by the threat of Nazi Germany. Smetona's regime was the first in Europe to put Nazis on trial: as early as 8 February 1934, action was taken against Nazis in the Memel region, which was autonomous within Lithuania. The Smetona regime's trial of Ernst Neumann and Freiherr von Sass (July 1934 to March 1935) was the first attempt anywhere to bring Nazis to justice and saw 76 Hitlerites imprisoned and four sentenced to death, though the sentences were commuted to life imprisonment. By 1938, however, Memel was becoming a difficult issue for a regime spending a quarter of its budget on defence and expensive army modernisation, and the Nazis won 26 of 29 seats in elections.

The following year, Smetona surrendered Memel to Hitler and declared a state of emergency; he never lost his distaste for Hitler and Nazism and had been so discredited by the loss of Memel that members of Lithuania's political opposition were appointed to his cabinet to try recovering credibility and domestic stability.

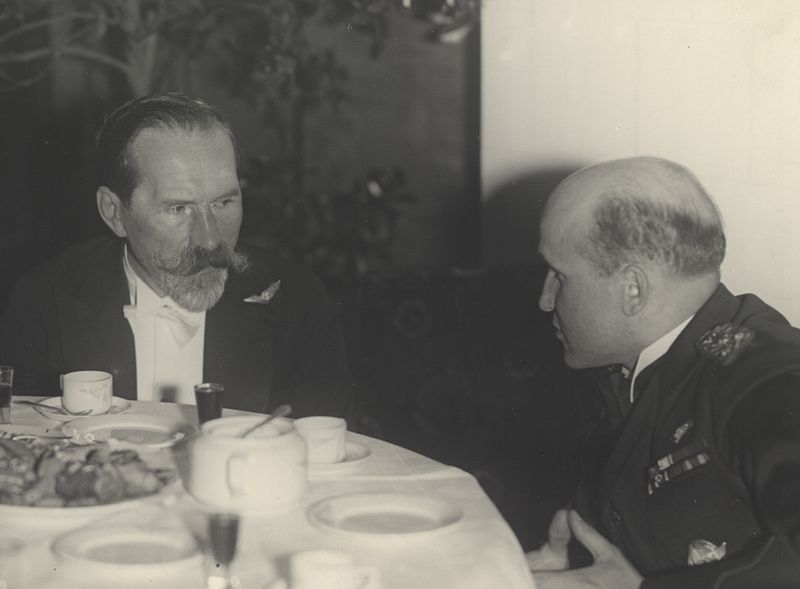
Smetona with Antanas Gustaitis, known for Lithuanian ANBO aircraft

Smetona's government was cautious about industrialisation, as its support base lay in the dominant rural population. As dictator, Smetona did nothing to encourage direct foreign investment, which remained extremely limited throughout his time in office. Nonetheless, during Smetona's dictatorship, Lithuania advanced economically: industrial output, mainly directed to domestic demand, when he was overthrown by the Soviet invasion was twice what it had been before the coup that brought him to power, and the country's transport network had been greatly improved by the construction of railways from Šiauliai to Klaipėda and from Kaunas to the south and north-east. In contrast, Smetona was more generous in support for the agricultural sector, which then provided almost all of Lithuania's exports despite occasionally protests against the regime.

=== Soviet occupation ===
Lithuania was occupied by the Soviets in 1940 as a consequence of the 1939 Molotov–Ribbentrop Pact between Nazi Germany and the Soviet Union. After the Soviets presented an ultimatum to Lithuania in June that year, Smetona proposed armed resistance against them, but most of the government and army commanders believed that the country was not capable of effective resistance with Soviet troops stationed inside Lithuania. On 15 June, Smetona turned his presidential duties over to Prime Minister Antanas Merkys on an interim basis, according to the constitution. Before leaving the presidential palace, Smetona said: "I do not want to make Lithuania a bolshevik country with my own hands." He believed that by leaving the country, he would be in a position to do more for the country by leading a government-in-exile than by becoming a Soviet puppet. He firstly fled to Germany with his family. Shortly afterwards, the Smetonas fled to Switzerland.

A day after Smetona left the country, Merkys announced that he had deposed him and was now president himself. Two days later, Merkys was pressured into appointing the more pliant Justas Paleckis as prime minister and resigning. Paleckis then became acting president, and was used as a puppet to oversee the final stages of Lithuania's incorporation into the Soviet Union a month later.

Since Lithuania declared independence from the Soviet Union in 1990, it has taken the position that Merkys's takeover of the presidency was illegal and unconstitutional since Smetona never formally resigned. Lithuania thus does not recognize Merkys or Paleckis as legitimate presidents and contends that all subsequent actions leading up to the Soviet annexation were ipso facto void.

== Flight abroad ==
"I do not want to bolshevize Lithuania with my own hands."

— Antanas Smetona, about his motives to leave Lithuania when his request for military resistance against the Soviets was rejected as impossible.

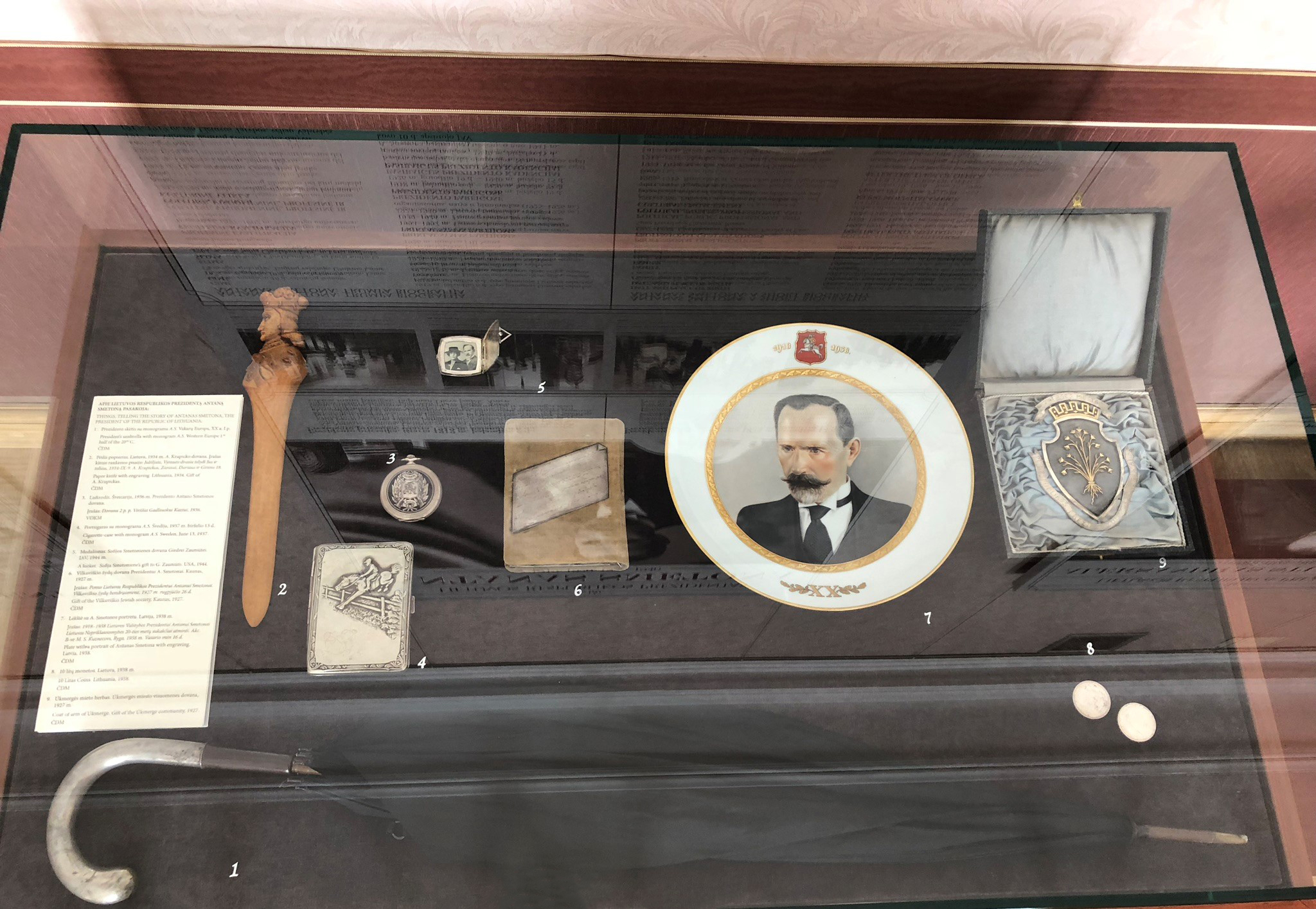
Presidential umbrella with monogram A. S., medallion with his wife Sofija Smetonienė, plate with Smetona's picture, Swiss watch

On the morning of 15 June, just after the government decided to accept the Soviet ultimatum, Smetona made hasty preparations to flee the country. He was accompanied by his wife, his son and daughter and their spouses and children, the former minister of defense Kazys Musteikis, and two presidential adjutants. Smetona departed Kaunas at about 3pm that day. They stopped in Kybartai on the border with Nazi Germany. Smetona and Musteikis attempted to summon the 9th Infantry Regiment from Marijampolė to protect them and to offer at least symbolic resistance to the Red Army, but the regiment was stopped by a delegation sent from Kaunas to retrieve the president. Smetona decided to cross the border without delay, but Lithuanian border guards would not allow him to pass. Around midnight, a local man led Smetona, his bodyguard, and an adjutant across the shallow Liepona stream. With Smetona already on the other side, his family managed to convince border guards to let them through at about 6am.

On the German side, Smetona was met by Heinz Gräfe, a Gestapo officer. Via Königsberg, the refugees were moved to a hunting lodge near the Święcajty (Schwenzait) lake in the Masurian Lake District. On 17 August, Smetona received permission to relocate to Berlin, where he settled on the Rankestraße. There, he was carefully supervised and only allowed to communicate with Lithuanian representative Kazys Škirpa. The Germans did not allow him to make any political moves so as not to upset the Soviet Union. It was clear that Smetona's presence was not desirable. On 4 September, Smetona officially petitioned the Embassy of the United States in Berlin for U.S. visas. The request was granted, but only on the condition that while Smetona was in the U.S., he would not be considered the leader or representative of any state or government. It was a humiliating condition, but Smetona accepted it and left for Bern, Switzerland on 18 September. Musteikis stayed in Berlin.

In Bern, Smetona met with members of the Lithuanian Diplomatic Service, ambassadors and diplomats who continued to represent pre-occupation Lithuania. They hoped to establish a government-in-exile via the National Committee chaired by former prime minister Ernestas Galvanauskas. Smetona saw no need for such a committee and criticized the choice of Galvanauskas. The diplomats were not receptive to Smetona – he had no funds, authority, or political influence. Nevertheless, Smetona signed the so-called Kybartai Act – a backdated document supposedly written in Kybartai before his exile. The Act dismissed Antanas Merkys and appointed Stasys Lozoraitis as both prime minister and acting president. This controversial document was never used in practice.

Smetona departed Bern for Lisbon in January 1941. He stayed in Monte Estoril at the Pensão Zenith. He left for Brazil aboard the Serpa Pinto, arriving in Rio de Janeiro on 14 February. He was met by local officials and Lithuanian emigrants, and had a meeting with Getúlio Vargas, the president of Brazil. Smetona departed Brazil on 26 February. On 9 or 10 March 1941, Smetona and his wife arrived in New York on the SS Argentina. He was greeted by about 30 American journalists and photographers as well as Lithuanian-American representatives. He was escorted to The Pierre hotel, where an evening function with about 400 guests was held on 13 March. Since Smetona was a private individual in the United States, the gathering did not include any members of U.S. organizations.

They lived temporarily at the Embassy of Lithuania in Washington, D.C., but their relationship with representative Povilas Žadeikis was tense. Smetona then lived in Pittsburgh and Chicago before settling in Cleveland in May 1942 with his son's family. While in exile, he began work on a history of Lithuania and on his memoirs.

== Death and burial ==
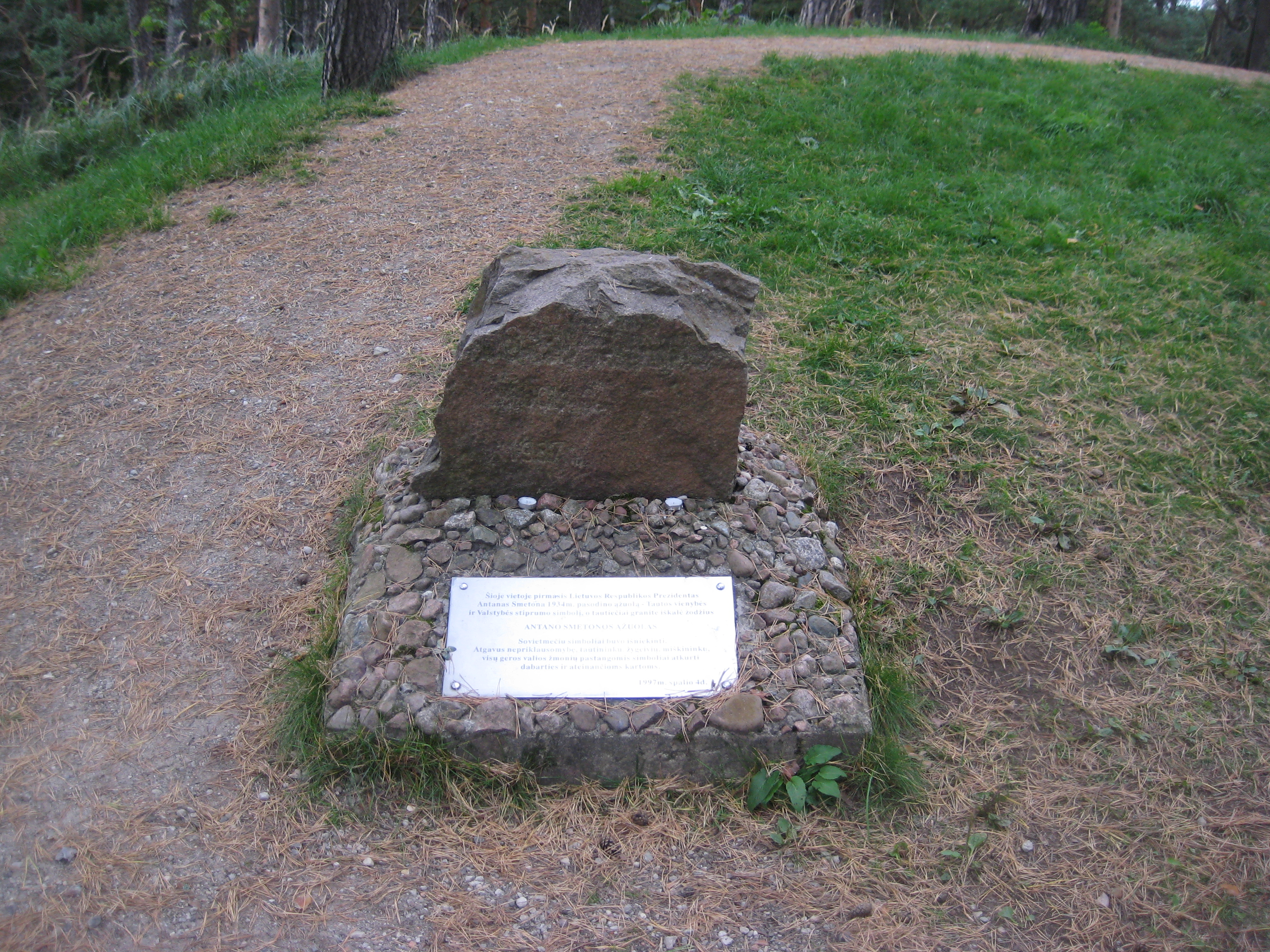
A memorial stone of Smetona in Ginučiai, Lithuania

As Smetona was busy with his writing, he paid little attention to the fact that the heating system in his son's house needed repair and was becoming dangerous. On 28 October 1943, Smetona wrote:

The night before yesterday coal fumes made me dizzy. I could not think clearly. Now I have completely recovered.

On 9 January 1944, a fire broke out in the house. Smetona's son Julius noticed the fire while on the first floor. Above him, in the attic suite, Smetona and his wife Sofija spotted the smoke seeping in under the door. Sofija opened the door and she and Smetona began descending the stairs. Smetona, apparently decided that he could not go outside without a coat – he was recovering from the flu and was to give a talk in the coming weeks – and without saying anything to his wife, returned to get his fur coat. It took just a few minutes for him to be overcome by the smoke. Julius tried to return into the burning building to save his father but was forced out by the smoke and fire. Smetona was found lying on the kitchen floor on the second floor of Julius' flat. He was not burned.

Firefighters took Smetona outside and he was rushed to hospital by ambulance. He died before arriving.

The official record said that the fire was caused by an overheated furnace. Some believe, however, that due to Smetona's continued political activities, the fire was started by the Soviet Intelligence Service (called the NKGB at the time). With no evidence turning up in the subsequent years to substantiate that claim, it is, however, doubtful.

On 13 January, Smetona's funeral took place at Cleveland's Cathedral of St. John the Evangelist. Bishop Edward F. Hoban officiated. Smetona was buried at Calvary Cemetery in Cleveland.

His wife Sofija died in Cleveland on 28 December 1968.

The couple were survived by their daughter, Marija Danutė Smetonaitė (1905–1992), son Julius Rimgaudas Smetona (1913–1974) and Julius' sons, Anthony Algirdas Smetona (1939–2012), Juozas Smetona (1940–1996), and Vytautas Julius Smetona (born 1955).

In 1975, Smetona's remains were moved from Cleveland's Knollwood Cemetery mausoleum to a crypt (No. 103) next to his wife Sofija in All Souls Cemetery in Chardon, Ohio.

== Awards ==
- Holy See: Order of Pope Pius IX (1927)
- Latvia: Order of the Three Stars, 1st Class with Collar (17 November 1928)

== See also ==
- List of Lithuanian rulers
- Konstantin Päts
- Kārlis Ulmanis
- European interwar dictatorships

== Bibliography ==
- Eidintas, Alfonsas; Žalys, Vytautas [in Lithuanian]; Senn, Alfred Erich (1999). Tuskenis, Edvardas (ed.). Lithuania in European Politics: The Years of the First Republic, 1918–1940 (Paperback ed.). New York: St. Martin's Press. ISBN 0-312-22458-3.
- Eidintas, Alfonsas (2015). Antanas Smetona and His Lithuania: From the National Liberation Movement to an Authoritarian Regime (1893-1940). On the Boundary of Two Worlds. Translated by Alfred Erich Senn. Brill Rodopi. ISBN 978-9-004-30203-7.
- Merkelis, Aleksandras [in Lithuanian] (1964). Antanas Smetona: jo visuomeninė, kultūrinė ir politinė veikla (in Lithuanian). New York: American Lithuanian Council. OCLC 494741879.
- Senn, Alfred Erich (2007). Lithuania 1940: Revolution from Above. On the Boundary of Two Worlds. Brill Rodopi. ISBN 978-90-420-2225-6.
- Skirius, Juozas [in Lithuanian] (2010). "Prezidento Antano Ametonos atvykimas į JAV 1941 metais ir išeivijos pozicija" (PDF). Lietuvos istorijos metraštis (in Lithuanian). 2. ISSN 0202-3342. Archived from the original (PDF) on 13 February 2017.
- Smetona, Marius; Smetonienė, Anželika (2016). "Prezidentas A. Smetona, Lėno ir Užulėnio Smetonos: genealoginė apžvalga". Lituanistica (in Lithuanian). 62 (2). doi:10.6001/lituanistica.v62i2.3342. ISSN 2424-4716.
- Truska, Liudas [in Lithuanian] (1995). "Antanas Smetona". In Liekis, Algimantas [in Lithuanian] (ed.). Lietuvos respublikos prezidentai (in Lithuanian). Vilnius: Valstybinis leidybos centras. OCLC 654379537.
- Žukas, Vladas [in Lithuanian] (2000). Marijos ir Jurgio Šlapelių lietuvių knygynas Vilniuje (in Lithuanian). Vilnius: Mokslo ir enciklopedijų leidybos institutas. ISBN 9785420014578.

Political offices
Preceded by None	President of Lithuania; 4 April 1919 – 19 June 1920	Succeeded by Aleksandras Stulginskis
Preceded by Aleksandras Stulginskis	President of Lithuania; 19 December 1926 – 15 June 1940	Succeeded by Antanas Merkys
