= Saint Petersburg–Warsaw railway =

Historic railway line in Europe

Warsaw–St. Petersburg Railway
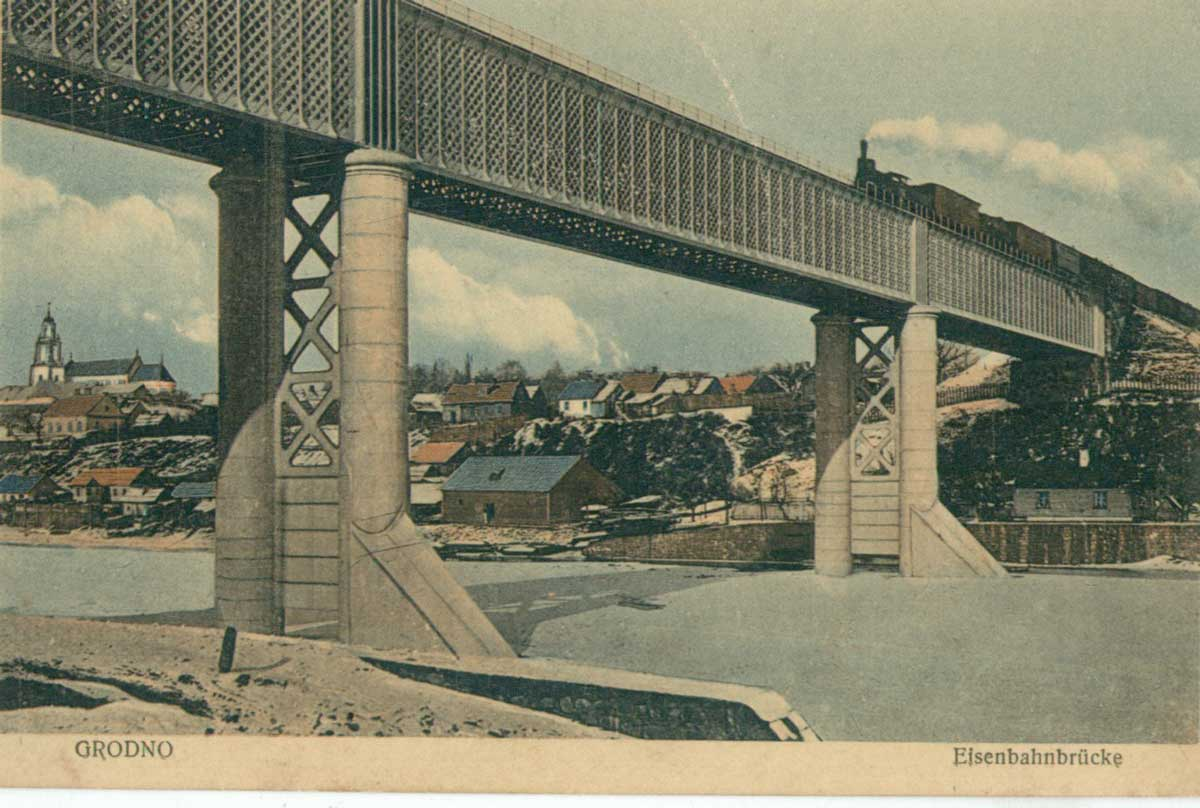
- Train on the Saint Petersburg–Warsaw railway crossing the River Neman on the railway bridge in Grodno before World War I

Overview
- Termini: Saint Petersburg; Warsaw

History
- Opened: 15 December 1862; 163 years ago

Technical
- Line length: 1,333 km (828 mi)
- Track gauge: (Warsaw–Hrodna) 1,435 mm (4 ft 8 1/2 in) standard gauge (Czarna Białostocka–Saint Petersburg) 1,520 mm (4 ft 11 27/32 in)

Saint Petersburg–Warsaw Railway (Russian: Санкт-Петербурго-Варшавская железная дорога, Sankt-Peterburgo–Varshavskaya zheleznaya doroga) is a 1,333 km (828 mi) long and partly defunct railway line between Saint Petersburg and Warsaw, built in the 19th century by the Russian Empire to connect the Russian capital with Central and Western Europe.

In 1851 the Tsarist Government of Russia made a decision to build the St. Petersburg–Warsaw railway line. It was built to Russian gauge. Construction of the main line between Saint Petersburg and Warsaw was completed and operations began in 1862. A separate branch line from Vilnius to the Prussian border connected Saint Petersburg with Western Europe via Königsberg and Berlin.

At the time of opening the entire railway line was within the Russian Empire: Warsaw was under the Russian partition of Poland. Due to territorial changes, the line now lies within five countries and crosses the eastern border of the European Union three times. Therefore, no passenger trains follow the entire route. Passenger trains between Saint Petersburg and Warsaw used to travel through Brest instead and a new line called Rail Baltica is under development to improve the direct connection between Poland and Lithuania.

== History ==
=== Construction ===
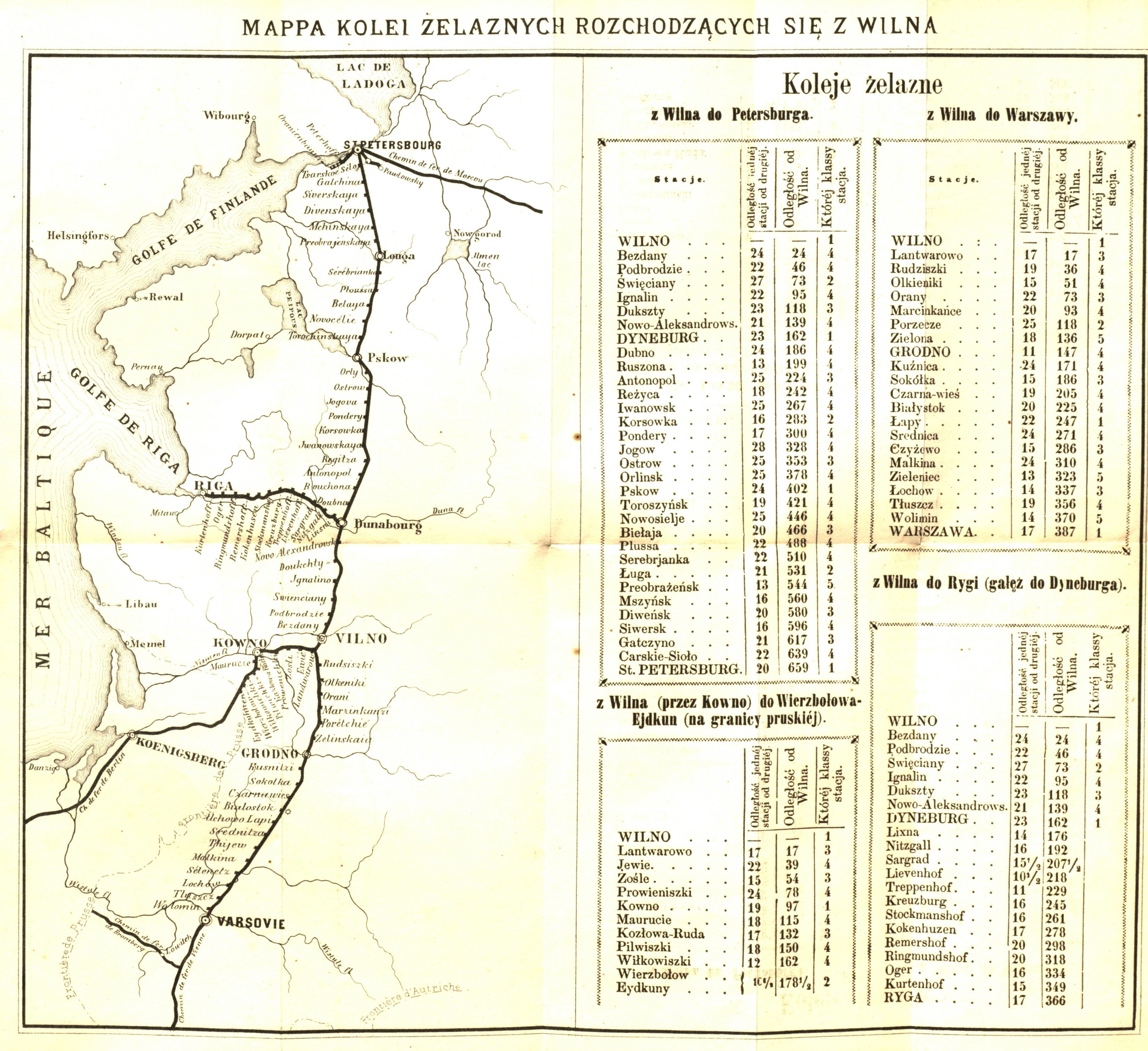
Map of the Saint Petersburg–Warsaw railway in 1862.

The opening of the railway between Saint Petersburg and Pavlovsk in 1836, the first public railway in Russia, led to a growing interest in building new railways in the Russian Empire. In 1851, the year of the opening of the railway between Saint Petersburg and Moscow, the Imperial Russian Government made the decision to also build a railway line between Saint Petersburg, then capital of the Russian Empire, and Warsaw, then the administrative centre of Russian Poland. On 15 February 1851, the Russian Emperor Nicholas I signed a decree on conducting surveys for the construction of the railway line, and on 23 November 1851, the Emperor signed the order for the construction of the railway as a strategically important line, which was to be built using state funds from the russian government.

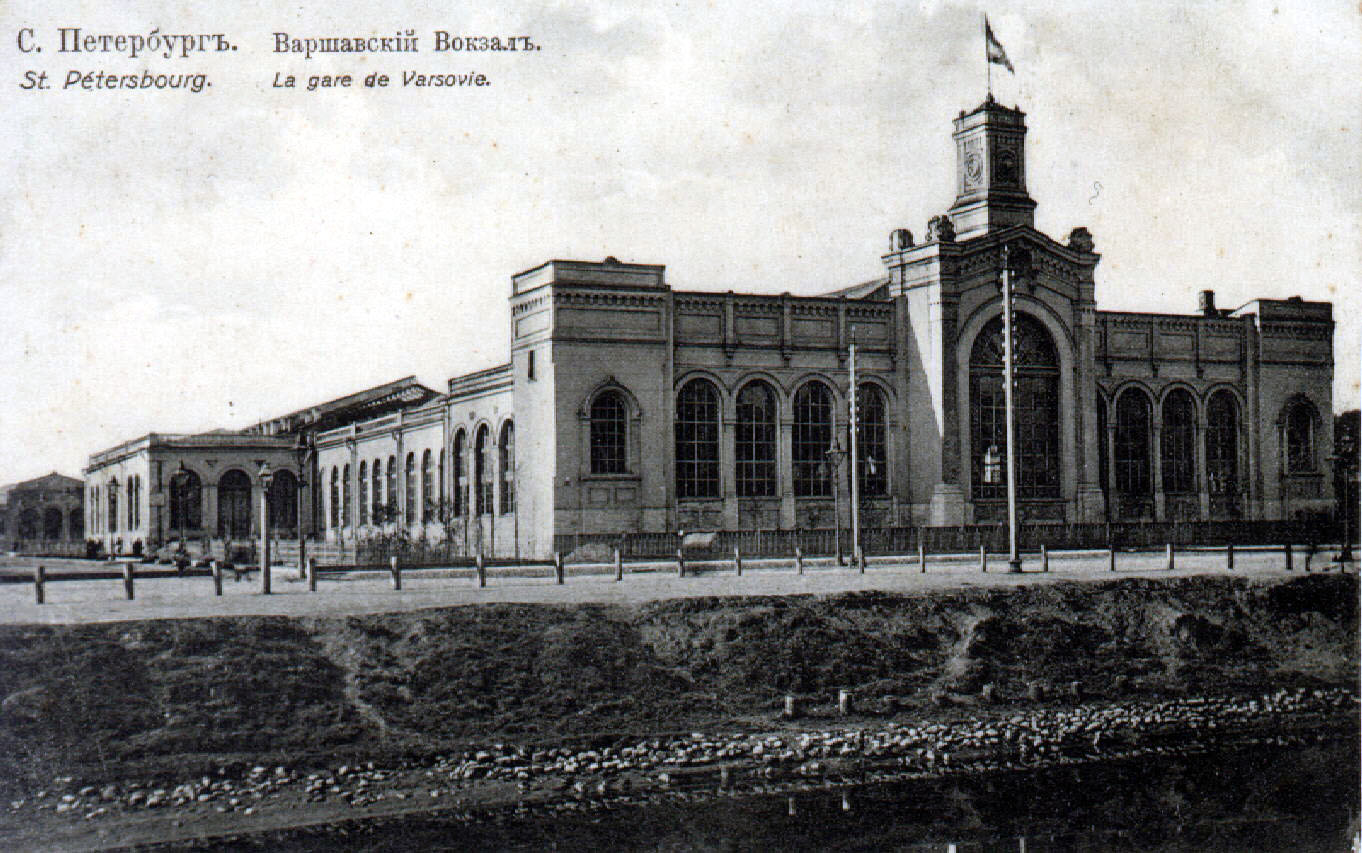
The Warsaw station in Saint Petersburg on a pre-1917 photo.

Construction began in 1852 under the supervision of the Russian engineer Eduard Gerstfeld with the Polish railway engineer Stanisław Kierbedź as deputy chief of construction. In 1853, the first section of the railway with a length of 41 versts (45 km (28 mi)) was completed between Saint Petersburg and the residential city of Gatchina. Daily scheduled train service on the section started on 31 October [N.S. 12 November] 1853. This was a double-track section, the only one on the otherwise single-track railway until the 1870s, when other sections were expanded to double track.

However, with the outbreak of the Crimean War in 1853, the work on other sections, where only earthworks had begun, was interrupted, as the war exhausted state funds. After the disastrous outcome of the Crimean War in 1856, which was considered as an effect of the backwardness of the Russian transport system, the Russian government decided in October 1856 to abandon its protectionist policy and try to attract foreign capital for the further expansion of the railway network. On 26 January 1857, the Main Society of Russian Railways (Russian: Главное общество российских железных дорог), of which the main capital was French, was founded. The construction work was transferred to the newly formed society.

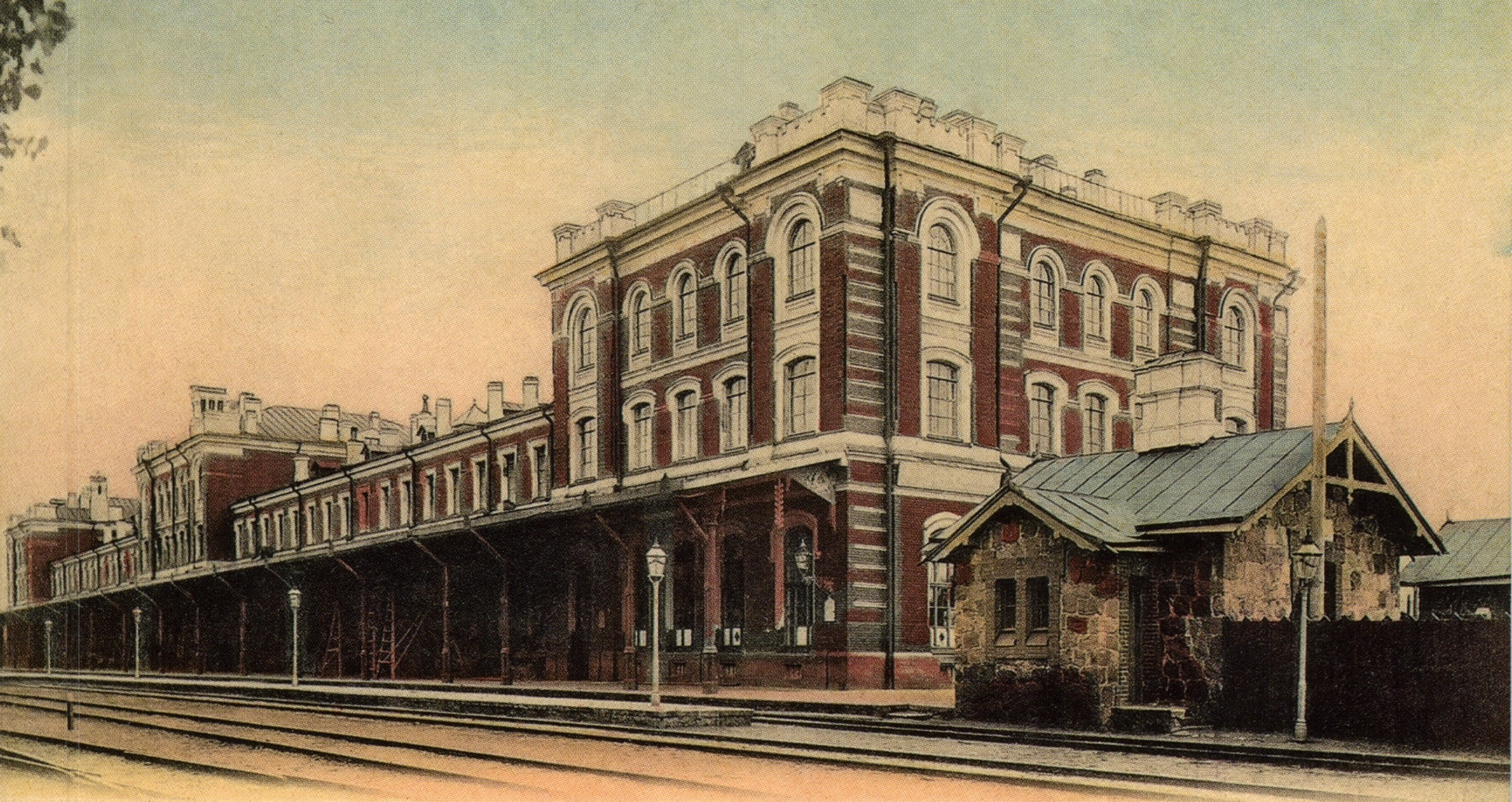
The Saint Petersburg–Warsaw railway station in Daugavpils, c. 1900.

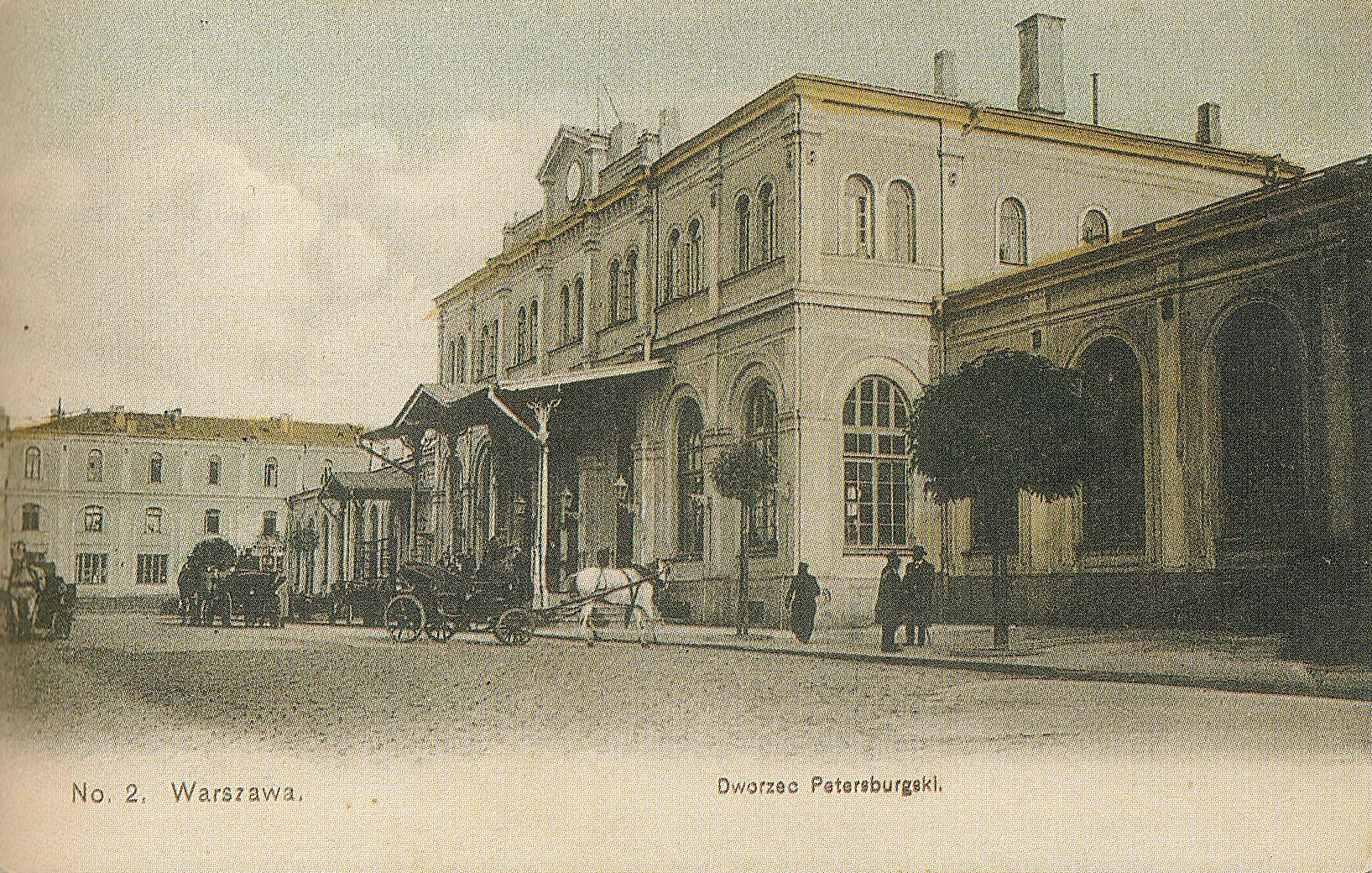
The Petersburg Station in Warsaw in 1908.

After the railway was transferred to the Main Society of Russian Railways, the construction was resumed under the supervision of the French engineer Édouard Collignon. The rest of the railway was subsequently opened in sections. Already in December 1857 the section from Gatchina to Luga was opened. On 19 July 1858, a first special train with members of the company's board of directors arrived in Pskov, On 22 September, the Emperor "deigned to arrive from Pskov to Tsarskoye Selo", although it took until February 1859 before daily train service on the section from Luga to Pskov with a length of 128 versts (137 km (85 mi)) was opened.

On 10 August 1859 the first steam locomotive arrived in Ostrov, and on 20 September in Dünaburg. And on 17 October, Emperor Alexander II, returning from the southern provinces, “deigned to travel from Dinaburg to Tsarskoye Selo along the newly built route.” The line from Pskov to Ostrov with a length of 49 versts (52 km (32 mi)) was opened to traffic on 26 January 1860, the line from Ostrov to Düneburg with a length of 191 versts (204 km (127 mi)) was opened to traffic on 8 November 1860.

In May 1858, construction started near Vilnius on the first section of 19 kilometers. On 1 May 1859 the ground works started along the entire route Daugavpils–Vilnius–Lentvaris–Kaunas–Kybartai. The end of summer of 1860 marked the end of the construction of the Ostrov-Daugavpils–Vilnius railway. The first train from Daugavpils arrived in Vilnius on 16 September [O.S. 4 September] 1860. The construction of the section from Lentvaris to Warsaw was completed on 15 December 1862.

Already the year before, in 1861, the branch line was completed from Vilnius to the Prussian border, and between the stations Virbalis in Russia (now Kybartai in Lithuania) and Eydtkuhnen in Prussia (now Chernyshevskoye in Russian Kaliningrad Oblast), the first junction between Russian gauge and standard gauge railway systems was built, with rails in both gauges between the two border stations.

The first locomotives for the St. Petersburg–Warsaw railway were bought in England, France, and Belgium. They were “G” class 0-6-0s with two cylinders. They were produced in Manchester in 1857, in Paris in 1860, and in Belgium in 1862. Their weight was 30–32 tons.

=== Later development ===
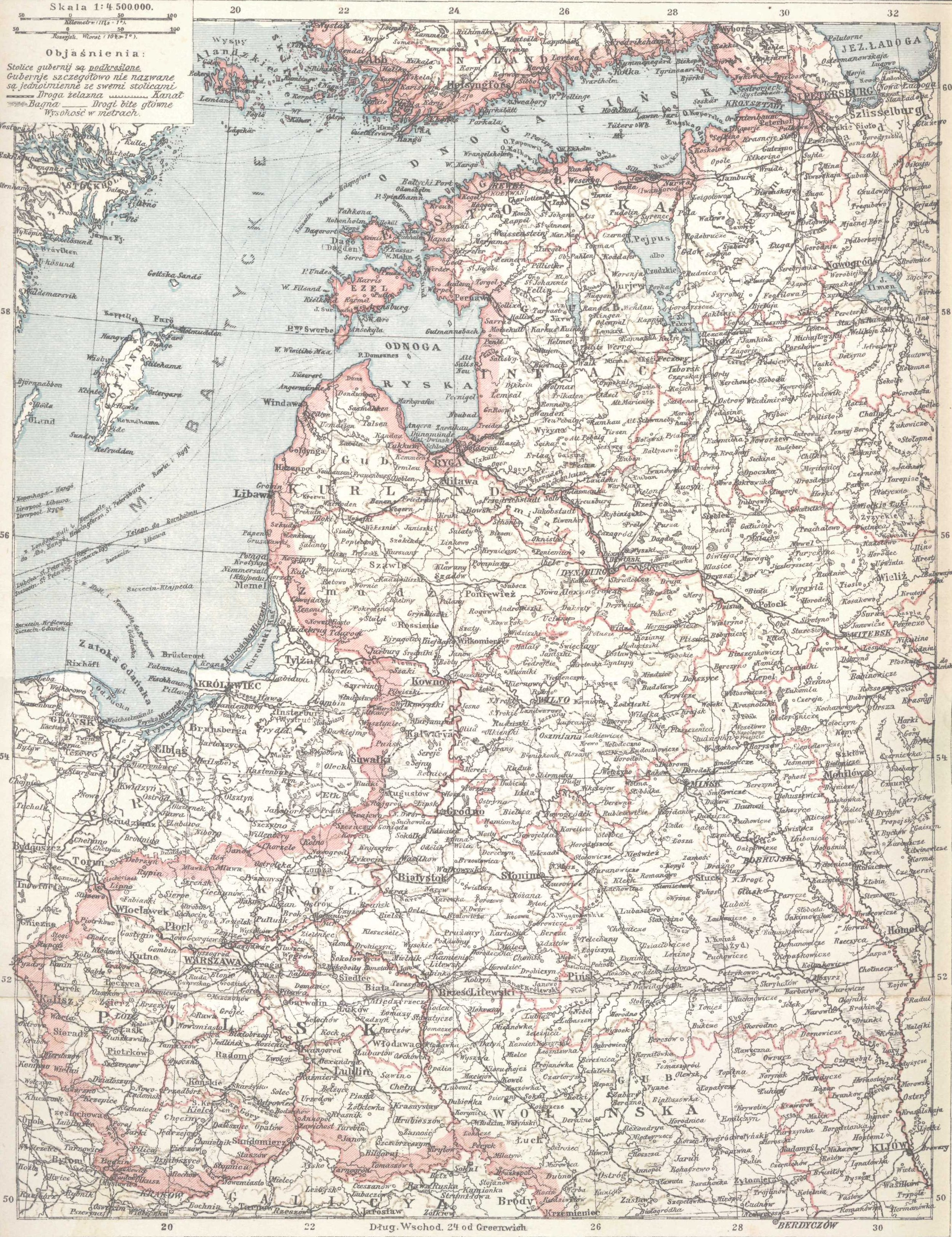
Map from 1902 which includes all of the railway

In 1895, the Saint Petersburg–Warsaw Railway Company was nationalized. On 1 January 1907, the Saint Petersburg–Warsaw Railway, along with the Baltic and Pskov–Riga Railway companies, became part of the North-Western Railways.

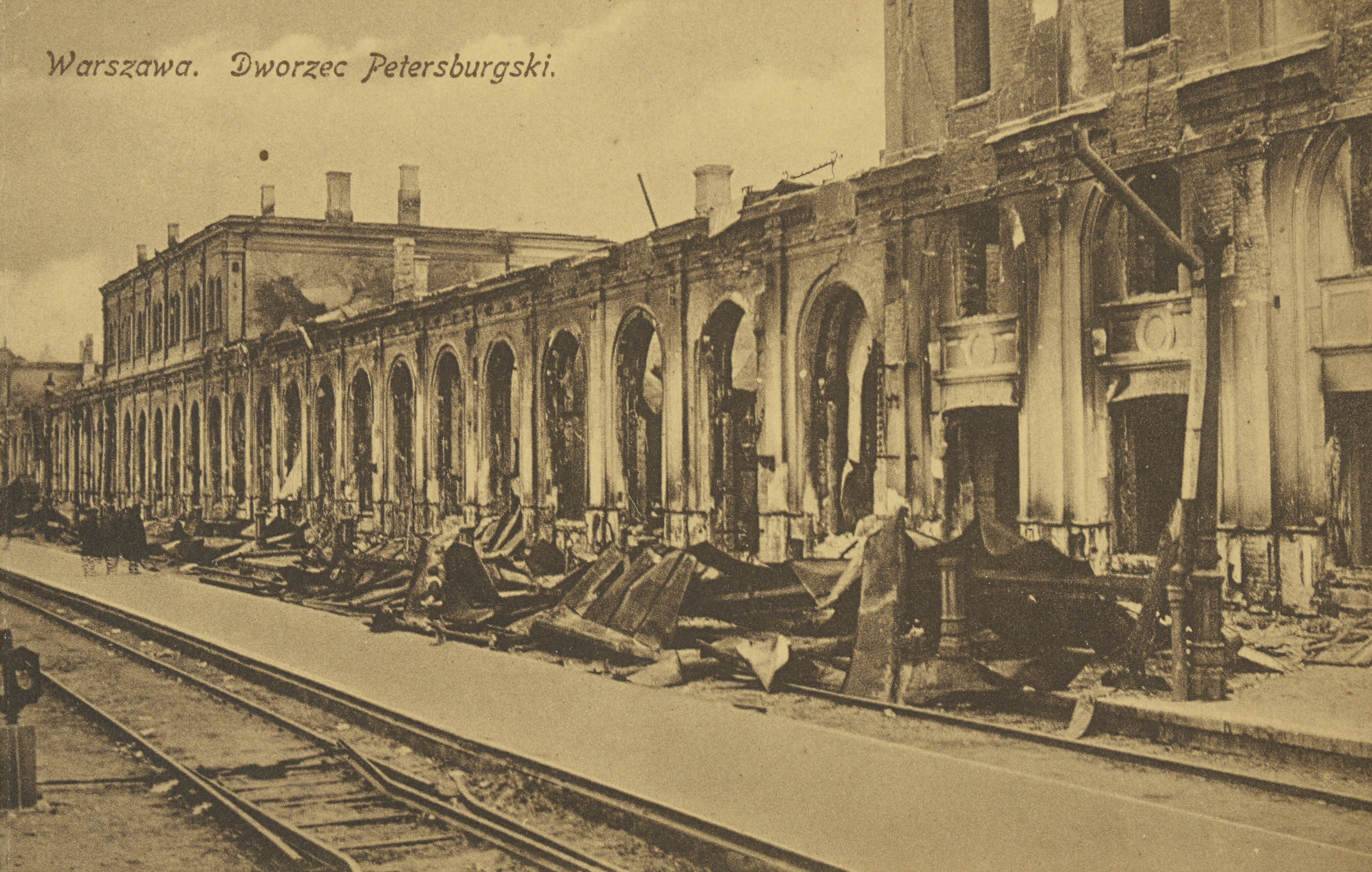
The destroyed Petersburg Station in Warsaw in 1915.

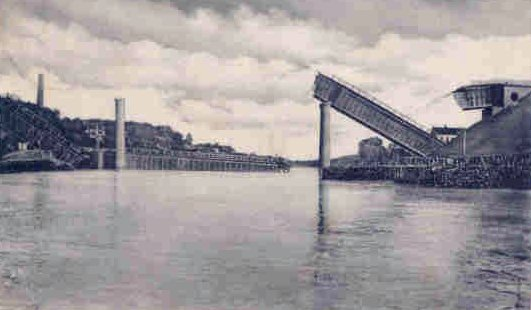
The destroyed railway bridge in Grodno across the River Neman in 1915.

In World War I, parts of the railway infrastructure were severely damaged during the Great Retreat where the withdrawing Russian army deliberately destroyed important infrastructure to prevent the advancing German army from making use of it. In August 1915, the Petersburg Station in Warsaw was blown up by withdrawing Russian troops, and burned down in the ensuing fire. And in late August 1915, the railway bridge in Grodno across the River Neman was blown up by the Russian forces.

The section of the railway between Vilnius and Warsaw was rebuilt to standard gauge in the 1920s when that area belonged to Poland.

The railway was partly destroyed again during World War II.

== Present ==
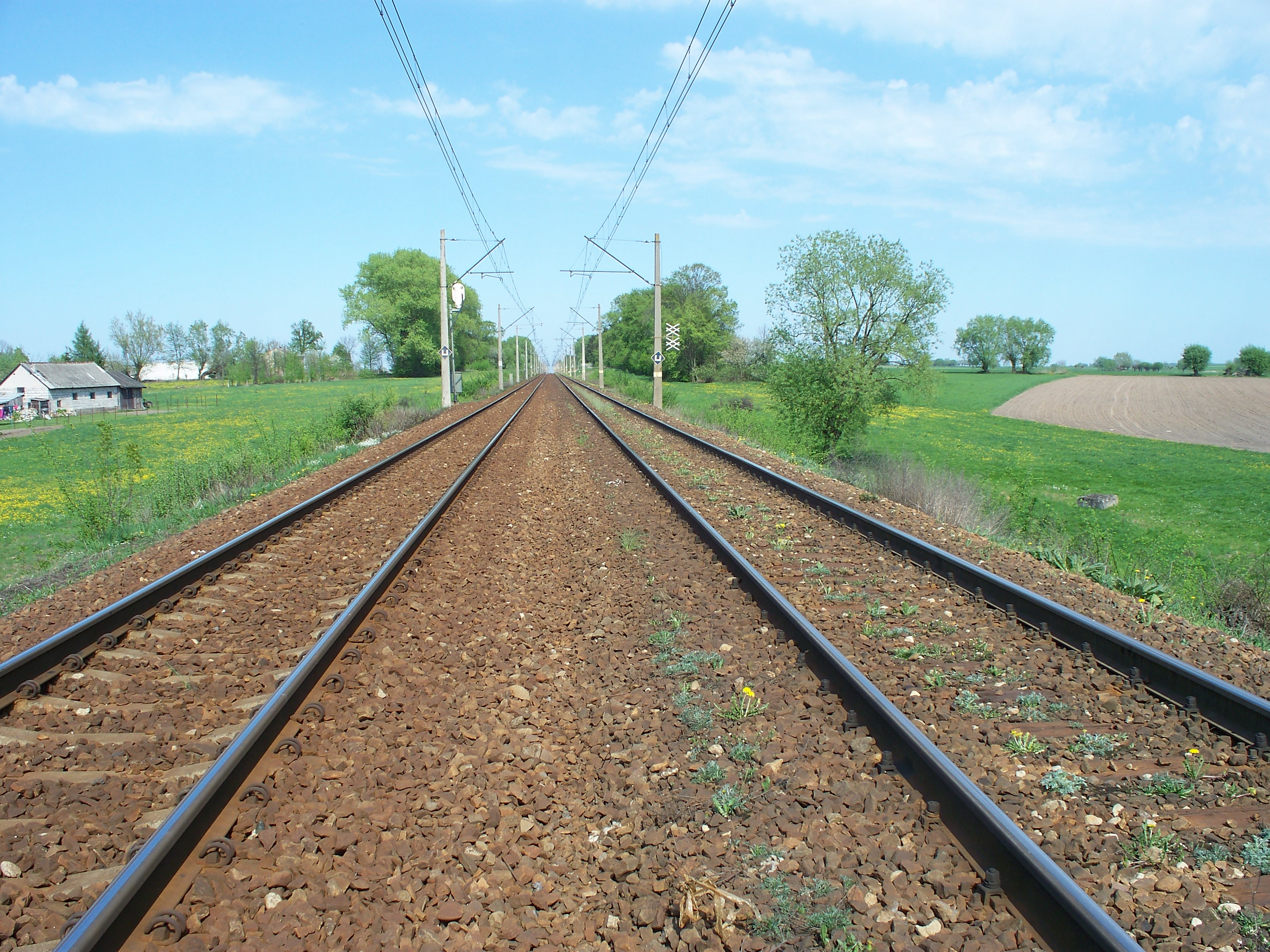
The section of the Saint Petersburg–Warsaw railway in Poland, today designated as the PKP rail line 6.

A 224 km section of the line between Zielonka, some 13km north-east of Warsaw and Kuźnica Białostocka on the Polish-Belarusian border, some 54km north-east Białystok is today designated by the Polish National Railways PKP Polskie Linie Kolejowe as PKP rail line 6. It is one of the country's major trunk lines. Since 2014 the line is being modernized to ultimately allow passenger trains to run at 200 km/h (125 mph) and freight trains at 120 km/h (75 mph), works include renewal of tracks and overhead lines, replacing level crossings with tunnels or overpasses and installation of ETCS level 2. The line is electrified along its entire length, and has two tracks up to Białystok.

In Zielonka a 9km long line built in 1933, today designated PKP rail line 449 branches of from the former Warsaw-Sankt Petersburg railway south to the former Warsaw–Terespol railway and through it to the Warsaw Cross-City Line and the other trunk lines of the Warsaw Railway Junction. The original route continues south-west as PKP rail line 21 terminating at the Warszawa Wileńska station in Warsaw Praga district, without reaching the city center. This segment is used only for local passenger traffic in the Warsaw metropolitan area, however due to large passenger volumes it is designated as a primary line. Line 21 also extends north-east from Zielonka to Wołomin along line 6, giving a total of four tracks on this segment.

From Białystok to Kuźnica Białostocka line 6 has only one track, which shortly before the Polish-Belarusian border is joined by a broad gauge track designated PKP rail line 57, with several transshipment facilities along its route. Both lines extend across the border and continue from Bruzhi into Hrodna, with the standard gauge line electrified at 3 kV DC which is commonly used by the Polish railways, rather than 25 kV AC used on the two Belarusian trunk lines. This allows Polish trains to reach Hrodna without the need for time consuming break of gauge operations and replacing traction power, and before 2020 Polish companies offered regular connections there.

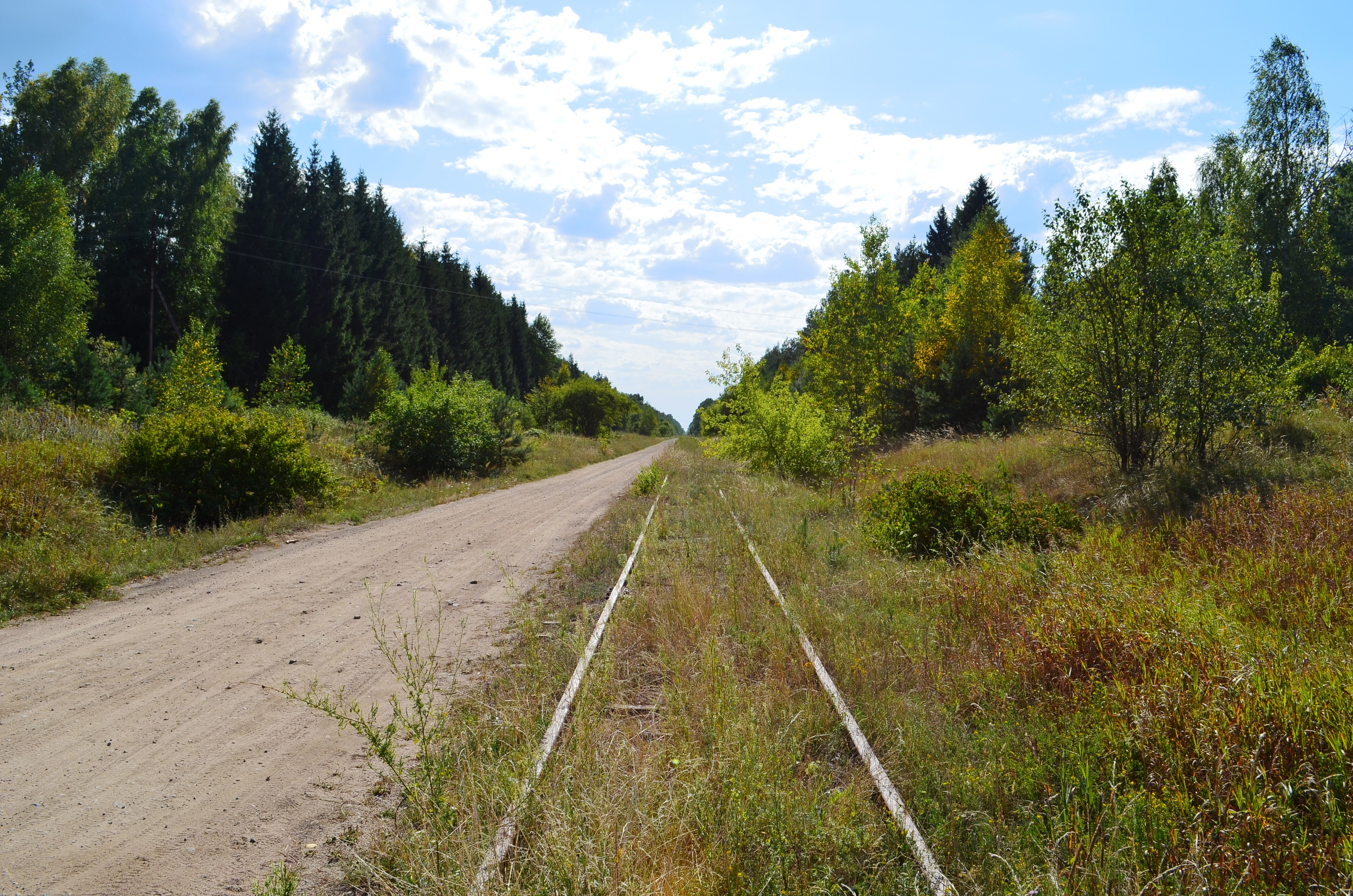
Now abandoned section of the line between Marcinkonys and Porechye in Lithuania.

From Hrodna however only the broad gauge track continues to Uzbieraž on the Belarusian–Lithuanian border. The track from the border to Marcinkonys in Lithuania has been dismantled at some point at the beginning of the 21st century, from Marcinkonys to Vilnius and further north-east the line remains in use for local regional traffic, although there have been some sporadic connections between Vilnius and Daugavpils.

Trains traveling between Warsaw and Vilnius today have to take a long detour through Ełk and Kaunas. It appears extremely unlikely a direct connection through Hrodna might be restored in the foreseeable future. Instead a project called Rail Baltica is underway to upgrade existing infrastructure and build new standard gauge lines in order to improve the rail connection from Poland to Lithuania, Latvia, further to Estonia and eventually to Finland, running entirely within EU territory.

== See also ==
- History of rail transport in Belarus
- History of rail transport in Latvia
- History of rail transport in Lithuania
- History of rail transport in Poland
- History of rail transport in Russia

== Sources ==
- Altbergs, T.; Augustāne, K.; Pētersone, I. (2009). Dzelzceļi Latvijā [Railways in Latvia] (in Latvian). Jumava. ISBN 978-9984-38-698-0.
- Fadejev, G. M., ed. (1994). История железнодорожного транспорта России [The history of rail transport in Russia] (in Russian). Vol. 1: 1836–1917. Saint Petersburg & Moscow.
- Kosakovskis, Gerasimas (1975). Железные дороги Литвы [Railways of Lithuania] (in Russian). Vilnius: Mokslas.
- Rakov, V. A. (Vitaliĭ Aleksandrovich) (1995). Lokomotivy otechestvennykh zheleznykh dorog 1845-1955 Локомотивы отечественных железных дорог 1845-1955 [National railways locomotives 1845–1955] (in Russian). Moscow: Transport. ISBN 5-277-00821-7.
- Vergara, Juan Camilo (2015). La Grande Société des Chemins de Fer Russes (1856-1862) : coopération ferroviaire franco-russe, administration de l'espace impérial et réformes de l'Etat en Russie au XIXe siècle [The Main Russian Railway Company (1856-1862) : Franco-Russian railway cooperation, administration of the imperial space and state reforms in Russia in the 19th century] (Doctorate thesis) (in French). Paris: École des hautes études en sciences sociales.
- Westwood, J. N. (1964). A History of Russian Railways. London: Allen & Unwin. OCLC 612838.
- Žeimantas, Liubomiras Viktoras (2001). "Peterburgo-Varšuvos geležinkelio tiesimas" [The construction of the Petersburg-Warsaw railway]. Lietuvos istorijos metraštis (in Lithuanian). 2000. Vilnius. ISSN 0202-3342.
