= Užulėnis =

- Village
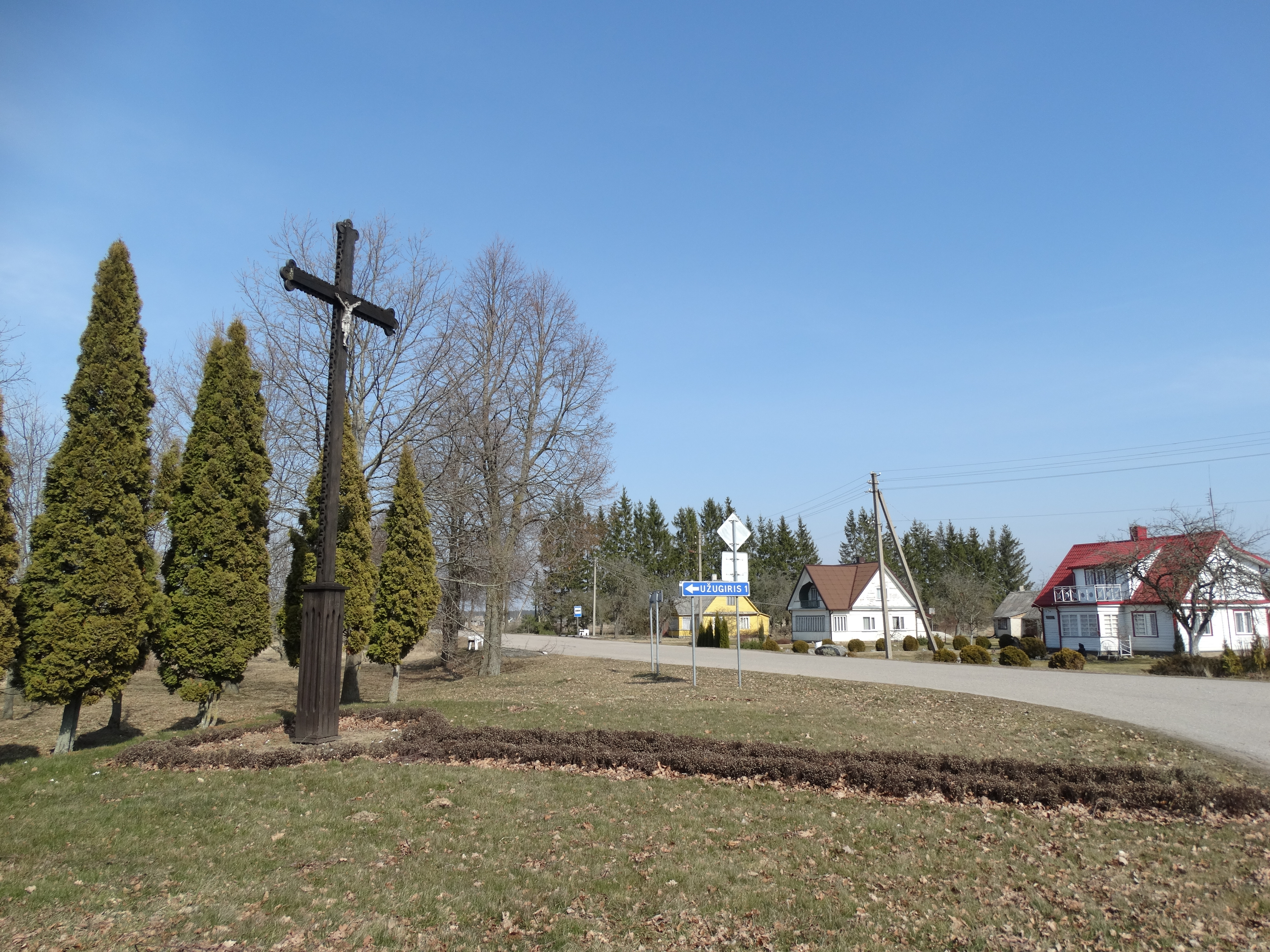

- Location of Užulėnis in Lithuania
- Coordinates: 55°25′08″N 24°34′52″E
- Country: Lithuania
- County: Vilnius County
- Municipality: Ukmergė District Municipality
- Eldership: Taujėnai eldership

Population (2011)
  - Total: 68
- Time zone: UTC+2 (EET)
  - Summer (DST): UTC+3 (EEST)

Užulėnis is a village in Ukmergė District Municipality, Vilnius County, Lithuania. According to the 2001 census, the village had a population of 90 people. The population decreased to 68 at the time of the 2011 census. The village is the birthplace of the first President of Lithuania Antanas Smetona.

Užulėnis formed as a linear village, with all houses hugging the road. Under the Serfdom in the Russian Empire, the village belonged to the Taujėnai Manor, controlled from 1826 by the Radziwiłł family. After the abolition of serfdom, some of the land surrounding the village was allocated to the villagers, with common grazing grounds.
