= History of rail transport in Belarus =

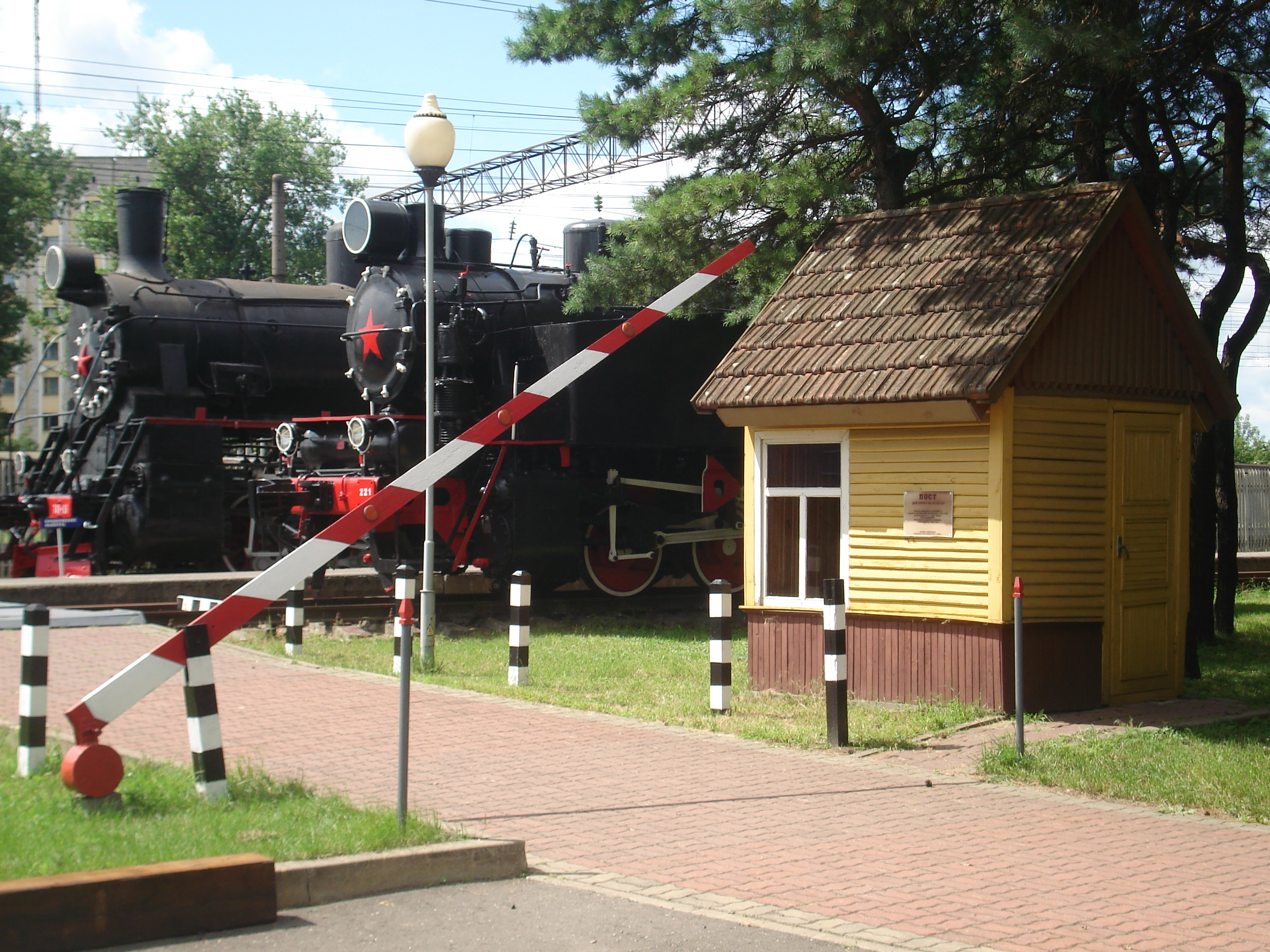
A view of the Baranovichi railway museum

The first line crossing Belarus was the Saint Petersburg–Warsaw Railway, which started operating in late 1862. This included section and railway station in Grodno. During the mid 1860s, a railway line was also built from Daugavpils to Polatsk and further to Vitebsk. The Warsaw–Brest Railway, opened in 1866; completed to Moscow in 1871.

The Libau–Romny Railway was built in 1871–1874. It passed through Belarus.

== See also ==
- Rail transport in Belarus
- Belarusian Railway
