= Porechye =

Porechye (Russian: Поречье) is the name of many rural localities in Russia.

== Arkhangelsk Oblast ==
As of 2010, one rural locality in Arkhangelsk Oblast bears this name:

- Porechye, Arkhangelsk Oblast, a village in Poponavolotsky Selsoviet of Velsky District

== Ivanovo Oblast ==
As of 2010, one rural locality in Ivanovo Oblast bears this name:

- Porechye, Ivanovo Oblast, a village in Shuysky District

== Kaliningrad Oblast ==
As of 2010, two rural localities in Kaliningrad Oblast bear this name:

- Porechye, Ozyorsky District, Kaliningrad Oblast, a settlement in Gavrilovsky Rural Okrug of Ozyorsky District
- Porechye, Pravdinsky District, Kaliningrad Oblast, a settlement under the administrative jurisdiction of the town of district significance of Pravdinsk, Pravdinsky District

== Kaluga Oblast ==
As of 2010, one rural locality in Kaluga Oblast bears this name:

- Porechye, Kaluga Oblast, a selo in Maloyaroslavetsky District

== Kemerovo Oblast ==
As of 2010, one rural locality in Kemerovo Oblast bears this name:

- Porechye, Kemerovo Oblast, a settlement in Podgornovskaya Rural Territory of Leninsk-Kuznetsky District

== Leningrad Oblast ==
As of 2010, three rural localities in Leningrad Oblast bear this name:

- Porechye, Kingiseppsky District, Leningrad Oblast, a village in Pustomerzhskoye Settlement Municipal Formation of Kingiseppsky District
- Porechye, Slantsevsky District, Leningrad Oblast, a village in Staropolskoye Settlement Municipal Formation of Slantsevsky District
- Porechye, Tikhvinsky District, Leningrad Oblast, a village in Shugozerskoye Settlement Municipal Formation of Tikhvinsky District

== Moscow Oblast ==
As of 2010, three rural localities in Moscow Oblast bear this name:

- Porechye, Mozhaysky District, Moscow Oblast, a selo in Poretskoye Rural Settlement of Mozhaysky District
- Porechye, Ruzsky District, Moscow Oblast, a village in Kolyubakinskoye Rural Settlement of Ruzsky District
- Porechye, Volokolamsky District, Moscow Oblast, a village in Teryayevskoye Rural Settlement of Volokolamsky District

== Novgorod Oblast ==
As of 2010, three rural localities in Novgorod Oblast bear this name:

- Porechye, Kholmsky District, Novgorod Oblast, a village in Morkhovskoye Settlement of Kholmsky District
- Porechye, Soletsky District, Novgorod Oblast, a village in Dubrovskoye Settlement of Soletsky District
- Porechye, Starorussky District, Novgorod Oblast, a village in Nagovskoye Settlement of Starorussky District

== Omsk Oblast ==
As of 2010, one rural locality in Omsk Oblast bears this name:

- Porechye, Omsk Oblast, a selo in Porechensky Rural Okrug of Muromtsevsky District

== Primorsky Krai ==
As of 2010, one rural locality in Primorsky Krai bears this name:

- Porechye, Primorsky Krai, a selo in Oktyabrsky District

== Pskov Oblast ==
As of 2010, seven rural localities in Pskov Oblast bear this name:

- Porechye (Khredinskaya Rural Settlement), Strugo-Krasnensky District, Pskov Oblast, a village in Strugo-Krasnensky District; municipally, a part of Khredinskaya Rural Settlement of that district
- Porechye (Novoselskaya Rural Settlement), Strugo-Krasnensky District, Pskov Oblast, a village in Strugo-Krasnensky District; municipally, a part of Novoselskaya Rural Settlement of that district
- Porechye (Novoselskaya Rural Settlement), Strugo-Krasnensky District, Pskov Oblast, a village in Strugo-Krasnensky District; municipally, a part of Novoselskaya Rural Settlement of that district
- Porechye, Bezhanitsky District, Pskov Oblast, a village in Bezhanitsky District
- Porechye, Dedovichsky District, Pskov Oblast, a village in Dedovichsky District
- Porechye, Pskovsky District, Pskov Oblast, a village in Pskovsky District
- Porechye, Velikoluksky District, Pskov Oblast, a village in Velikoluksky District

== Rostov Oblast ==
As of 2010, one rural locality in Rostov Oblast bears this name:

- Porechye, Rostov Oblast, a settlement in Rubashkinskoye Rural Settlement of Martynovsky District

== Sakhalin Oblast ==
As of 2010, two rural localities in Sakhalin Oblast bear this name:

- Porechye, Makarovsky District, Sakhalin Oblast, a selo in Makarovsky District
- Porechye, Uglegorsky District, Sakhalin Oblast, a selo in Uglegorsky District

== Smolensk Oblast ==
As of 2010, one rural locality in Smolensk Oblast bears this name:

- Porechye, Smolensk Oblast, a village in Poluyanovskoye Rural Settlement of Demidovsky District

== Sverdlovsk Oblast ==
As of 2010, one rural locality in Sverdlovsk Oblast bears this name:

- Porechye, Sverdlovsk Oblast, a settlement in Turinsky District

== Tula Oblast ==
As of 2010, two rural localities in Tula Oblast bear this name:

- Porechye (settlement), Opochensky Rural Okrug, Dubensky District, Tula Oblast, a settlement in Opochensky Rural Okrug of Dubensky District
- Porechye (village), Opochensky Rural Okrug, Dubensky District, Tula Oblast, a village in Opochensky Rural Okrug of Dubensky District

== Tver Oblast ==
As of 2010, eight rural localities in Tver Oblast bear this name:

- Porechye, Bezhetsky District, Tver Oblast, a selo in Porechyevskoye Rural Settlement of Bezhetsky District
- Porechye, Bologovsky District, Tver Oblast, a village in Valdayskoye Rural Settlement of Bologovsky District
- Porechye, Kalyazinsky District, Tver Oblast, a village in Nerlskoye Rural Settlement of Kalyazinsky District
- Porechye, Kesovogorsky District, Tver Oblast, a village in Nikolskoye Rural Settlement of Kesovogorsky District
- Porechye, Konakovsky District, Tver Oblast, a village in Selikhovskoye Rural Settlement of Konakovsky District
- Porechye, Rameshkovsky District, Tver Oblast, a village in Kiverichi Rural Settlement of Rameshkovsky District
- Porechye, Sonkovsky District, Tver Oblast, a selo in Koyskoye Rural Settlement of Sonkovsky District
- Porechye, Torzhoksky District, Tver Oblast, a village in Vysokovskoye Rural Settlement of Torzhoksky District

== Vladimir Oblast ==
As of 2010, one rural locality in Vladimir Oblast bears this name:

- Porechye, Vladimir Oblast, a village in Alexandrovsky District

== Yaroslavl Oblast ==
As of 2010, one rural locality in Yaroslavl Oblast bears this name:

- Porechye, Yaroslavl Oblast, a village in Levtsovsky Rural Okrug of Yaroslavsky District
