= Porechye, Vladimir Oblast =

Porechye Поречье
- Village
- Location within Vladimir Oblast Location within Russia
- Coordinates: 56°25′N 39°04′E
- Country: Russia
- Region: Vladimir Oblast
- District: Alexandrovsky District
- Time zone: UTC+3:00

Porechye (Russian: Поречье) is a rural locality (a village) in Andreyevskoye Rural Settlement, Alexandrovsky District, Vladimir Oblast, Russia. The population was 107 as of 2010.

== Geography ==
Porechye is located 28 km east of Alexandrov (the district's administrative centre) by road. Mezhakovo is the nearest rural locality.
