= Lietuvos istorijos metraštis =

Lietuvos istorijos metraštis (transl. Year-Book of Lithuanian History) is an academic journal covering the history of Lithuania published by the Lithuanian Institute of History. From 1971 to 2000 it was published once a year; since 2001 it is published twice a year. It is published in Lithuanian with summaries provided in English or German.

The journal publishes research articles by Lithuanian and foreign historians, archaeologists, ethnologists. It also publishes historical sources and reviews of recently published books.

As of 2020, 52 volumes have been published.

== Editors ==
The following persons are or have been editors-in-chief:

- Bronius Vaitkevičius (1971–1987)
- Vytautas Merkys (1988–2000)
- Zigmantas Kiaupa (2001–2016)
- Gintautas Sliesoriūnas (since 2017)
