= Babickas =

- Lithuanian surname
- m.: Babickas
- f.: (unmarried): Babickaitė
- f.: (married): Babickienė

Babickas is a Lithuanian surname, a counterpart of Polish surname Babicki, Russian: Babitsky. Notable people with the surname include:

- Kazys Babickas, Lithuanian military commander
- Petras Babickas (1903–1991), pioneer of Lithuanian radio journalism, publicist, writer, translator, diplomat, regional explorer, traveller, photographer
- Unė Babickaitė (1897–1961), Lithuanian actress and theatre director
