= Galdikas =

- Lithuanian surname
- m.: Galdikas
- f.: (unmarried): Galdikaitė
- f.: (married): Galdikienė

Galdikas is a Lithuanian surname literally meaning "blacksmith" Notable people with this surname include:

- Adomas Galdikas (1893–1969), Lithuanian-American artist
- Birutė Galdikas (1946–2026), Lithuanian-Canadian anthropologist, primatologist, conservationist, ethologist and author
- Juozas Galdikas (born 1958), 1997 Lithuanian Minister of Health
- Magdalena Galdikienė (1891–1979), Lithuanian educator and public figure
- Ona Galdikaitė (1898–1990), Lithuanian poet, nun and dissident
- Ovidijus Galdikas (born 1988), Lithuanian basketball player
- Simas Galdikas (born 1987), Lithuanian basketball player
