= Draugelis =

- Lithuanian surname
- m.: Draugelis
- f.: (unmarried): Draugelytė
- f.: (married): Draugelienė

Draugelis is a Lithuanian surname. Notable people with the surname include:

- Eliziejus Draugelis (1888 – 1981), Lithuanian physician and politician
- Magdalena Galdikienė née Draugelytė (26 September 1891 – 22 May 1979) was a Lithuanian Catholic feminist, teacher, and politician
