= Daina Society =

Lithuanian cultural organization

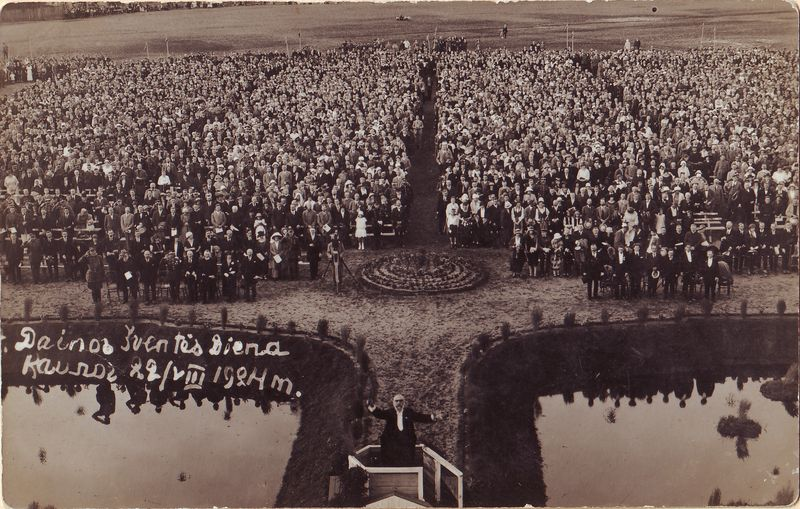
Spectators and performers at the first Lithuanian Song Festival in Kaunas, organized by the Daina Society in 1924.

Daina Society (daina means song in Lithuanian; Lithuanian: „Dainos“ draugija) was a Lithuanian cultural organization promoting Lithuanian folk traditions and songs. It was established as an illegal cultural society by the composer Juozas Naujalis and officially registered with the Tsarist authorities in 1905. Active from 1899 to 1944 in Kaunas, the society organized various events, concerts, amateur theater performances. In 1924, it initiated the first Lithuanian Song Festival.

== History ==
=== Before World War I ===
During the Lithuanian National Revival, Lithuanians were becoming more active. Prussian Lithuanians organized the Birutė Society in 1885 and smaller Lithuanian cultural societies were organized in Riga and Saint Petersburg, but such societies were illegal in Lithuania due to the strict Russification policies and the Lithuanian press ban. The Daina Society was organized by composer Juozas Naujalis in Kaunas in 1899. As an illegal organization, it often used a cover of a church choir and organized trips to countryside where members could sing in Lithuanian more freely. The society was legalized and officially registered on 19 April 1905 after the Tsarist authorities liberalized their policies due to the Russian Revolution of 1905. The first public performance was organized on 5 March 1905 with the staging of comedy America in the Bathhouse (Amerika pirtyje) and the choir's performance of about 14 folk songs at the Kaunas City Theatre.

The society had its own choir (50–75 singers), string quartet, amateur theater troupe and organized various musical evenings, concerts, performances that were frequently accompanied by lectures or speeches by such activists as Jonas Basanavičius, Mykolas Biržiška, Sofija Kymantaitė-Čiurlionienė, Gabrielius Landsbergis-Žemkalnis, Petras Leonas. For example, it organized a concert to raise funds for Lithuanian students at the Imperial University of Dorpat in 1907, a commemoration of the 10th death anniversary of Vincas Kudirka in 1909, an evening to raise money for a Lithuanian school of the Saulė Society in Šančiai in 1910, a theater performance to commemorate the 50th anniversary of the abolition of serfdom in the Russian Empire in 1911. Before World War I, the society staged more than 50 concerts and plays, including Pilėnų kunigaikštis (Duke of Pilėnai) by Marcelinas Šikšnys in 1907, A Marriage Proposal by Anton Chekhov in 1907, Mindaugas by Juliusz Słowacki in 1908, Prabočių šešėliai (Shadows of Ancestors) by Vydūnas in 1911, and Trys mylimos (Three Beloveds) by Žemaitė in 1911. To increase the repertoire of Lithuanian plays, the society organized a contest of drama works in 1908. In 1908, 1911, and 1914, the society organized Lithuanian art exhibitions in Kaunas (after they were shown in Vilnius by the Lithuanian Art Society). The society organized events not only in Kaunas but also in Ukmergė, Kernavė, Kėdainiai, Jurbarkas, Seredžius.

=== Interwar ===
Daina was closed in 1915 due to World War I, however Naujalis reestablished it only a year later. During the war, despite difficult circumstances, the society organized more than ten events. In 1919, its theater troupe was directed by Unė Babickaitė. It was revitalized by composer Stasys Šimkus who returned from the United States in 1920. He organized concerts together with opera singers Antanas Sodeika and Kipras Petrauskas and hoped to organize a tour in Vilnius Region before it was captured by Poland in the Żeligowski's Mutiny. The society staged operettas Užburtas kunigaikštis (Bewitched Duke) by Mikas Petrauskas in 1922 and The Geisha by Sidney Jones in 1924. Many theater performers left Daina when the State Theater was established in 1924 and the society became more prominent in music. In 1924, the society initiated the first Lithuanian Song Festival. In 1925, Daina had 532 members. It also had branches in other cities across Lithuania – 22 chapters in 1925, including in Alytus, Kybartai, Papilė, Jurbarkas. The society had a choir, a vocal quartet, various instrumental groups. In a year, it organized about 15–20 concerts performing mostly Lithuanian folk songs as well as songs by Juozas Gruodis, Juozas Naujalis, Teodoras Brazys. The society often performed during various official state functions and organized various fundraising events for the benefits of the Lithuanian Army or the Union for the Liberation of Vilnius. In 1929–1930, the society rented a park in Ąžuolynas for summer concerts and organized concerts, performances of ballet dancers and circus acrobats, film screenings, photo exhibitions. In 1938, the society organized a tour in Latvia. The last concert in independent Lithuania was held on 16 December 1939 at the Kaunas Garrison Officers' Club Building – it commemorated the 40th anniversary of Daina. Unlike many other Lithuanian societies, Daina was not closed after the Soviet occupation in June 1940. In 1940, it organized 27 concerts though its repertoire was changed to include communist and revolutionary songs, including The Internationale. The society was active until 1944.

== Chairpersons ==
The society was chaired by:

- Rokas Šliūpas (1904–1906)
- Jonas Stonkus (1907–08)
- Petras Leonas (1908–1914)
- Romanas Chodakauskas (1913–1915)
- Antanas Pranaitis (1917–1919)
- Pranas Butkus (1920)
- Klimas Prielgauskas (1921)
- Jurgis Štuopis (1922)
- Juozas Gaidamavičius (1923)
- Jonas Žilevičius (1924–1925)
- Jonas Bendorius (1925–1934)
- Zigmas Bačelis (1935–1940)
- Paulina Girdzijauskienė (1940)

== Members ==
Many prominent Lithuanian figures were members of the Diana Society, including composers Aleksandras Kačanauskas, Nikodemas Martinonis, Jonas Bendorius, opera singers Kipras Petrauskas, Juozas Babravičius, Vladislava Grigaitienė, Adelė Galaunienė, ballet dancer Jadvyga Jovaišaitė-Olekienė, writers Sofija Kymantaitė-Čiurlionienė, Liudas Gira, priests Maironis, Adomas Jakštas-Dambrauskas, Juozas Tumas-Vaižgantas, playwrights Gabrielius Žemkalnis-Landsbergis, Liudas Žilinskas, actors Antanas Sutkus, Ona Rymaitė, Aleksandras Vitkauskas, choirmasters and conductors Vincas Nacevičius, Pijus Adomavičius, Antanas Dvarionas, Juozas Karosas, Juozas Kudokas, painter Tadeusz Dowgird, politician and businessman Martynas Yčas, lawyer Romanas Chodakauskas, Prime Minister Juozas Tubelis.
