= Jonynas =

Jonynas (masculine), Jonynienė (feminine married), Jonynaitė (feminine unmarried) is a Lithuanian surname. Notable people with the surname include:

- Antanas Jonynas (1923–1976), Lithuanian poet
- Antanas A. Jonynas (born 1953), Lithuanian poet
- Ignas Jonynas, Lithuanian historian
- Vytautas Kazimieras Jonynas, Lithuanian artist
