= Saulė Society =

Catholic educational society in Lithuania (1906–1940)

Saulė Society (Lithuanian: Lietuvių švietimo draugija "Saulė"; "saulė" means sun) was a Catholic educational society active in Lithuania from 1906 to 1940. It organized and maintained Lithuanian-language schools in the Kovno Governorate, Russian Empire, and later interwar Lithuania.

The society organized local primary schools, evening courses for adults, libraries and reading rooms, and kindergartens. From 1907 to 1914, the society established about 62 primary schools and adult courses. It also organized teachers' courses that grew into Saulė Teachers' Seminary and bookkeeping courses. Several schools were evacuated to Voronezh where the Lithuanian Society for the Relief of War Sufferers organized a number of Lithuanian schools. Saulė Society was able to organize more middle and secondary schools during the German occupation during World War I. In 1919, Saulė maintained ten gymnasiums and progymasiums that had about 1,600 students. The role of the society diminished after Lithuania regained independence and a number of its schools were nationalized. The society was fully liquidated after the Soviet occupation of Lithuania in 1940

== Establishment ==
After the failed Uprising of 1863, the Tsarist regime enacted strict Russification policies: the Lithuanian press was prohibited, all non-government schools were closed, and government schools prohibited the use of the Lithuanian language. When the restrictions were lifted in 1904, Lithuanians organized societies Saulė in the Kovno Governorate and Žiburys (light, beacon) in the Suwałki Governorate to fund and operate Lithuanian schools.

On 25 June 1906, Kovno Governor Petr Verevkin approved the statute of Saulė Society. Its founders included priests Konstantinas Olšauskas (long-term chairman) and Povilas Januševičius, physician Rokas Šliūpas, and teacher Tomas Ferdinandas Žilinskas. The society collected a membership fee (no less than 5 rubles) per year) and annually elected a 7-member board. Saulė's primary funding came from various donations, mostly collected by priests and churches. Its budget grew from 6,451 rubles in 1908 to 23,507 rubles in 1913.

Due to the efforts of bishop Mečislovas Leonardas Paliulionis, the society's program was quickly revised to emphasize that it is a Catholic organization open only to Catholics. This caused issues with the Tsarist authorities in 1910 when they closed Saulė and ten other Lithuanian societies because they were deemed to be religious. Konstantinas Olšauskas, Maironis, and Aleksander Meysztowicz visited Prime Minister Pyotr Stolypin and were able to reinstate Saulė Society.

== Activities ==
=== Schools ===
==== School network ====
Saulė primary schools
Year	Chapters	Schools	Students
1908	50	41	1,600
1910	72	45	2,654
1912	68	24	1,493

Saulė Society established local chapters in cities and towns of the Kovno Governorate. Chapters needed at least 10 members and were frequently organized by local priests. In a few places, the schools were sponsored by local nobles (e.g. in Kurtuvėnai and Astravas). These chapters then organized local primary schools, evening courses for adults, libraries and reading rooms, and kindergartens. By 1907, the society already had 32 local chapters and 25 primary schools. In 1909, Saulė maintained 32 libraries with 8,754 books; during the year, they served about 3,800 readers. In 1910, Saulė had 45 primary schools: four two-year schools, 18 one-year schools, and 24 people's schools (these were primitive schools that did not need a qualified teacher). After complaints from the Vilna Educational District, 24 people's schools were closed in 1910. In 1913, Saulė had 63 chapters with 3,372 members. From 1907 to 1914, the society established about 62 primary schools and adult courses.

During World War I, some schools of Saulė were evacuated to Russia. During the German occupation, the society was able to organize Lithuanian gymnasiums in Kaunas (due to the efforts of Saliamonas Banaitis) and Panevėžys in 1915. Olšauskas was able to obtain 100,000 marks from Ober Ost for the schools. Later, Saulė established gymnasiums and progymnasiums in Biržai, Jurbarkas, Kražiai, Ramygala, Rokiškis, Švėkšna, Utena, Telšiai, and Žagarė. In 1919, Saulė maintained ten gymnasiums and progymasiums that had about 1,600 students.

==== Curriculum ====
The schools charged a small tuition. They were mainly co-educational, though Saulė had five girls' only schools in 1913. The curriculum included lessons on Lithuanian and Russian languages, religion, arithmetic, penmanship, and drawing and called for 30 hours of instruction per week (almost double the hours of a government school).

Schools maintained by Saulė supported and promoted the ideology of the Roman Catholic Church and the Lithuanian national identity. Tsarist authorities investigated the society several times and noted that it did not promote unity with the Russian people. For example, the society kept some protocols and documents in Lithuanian and some schools did not display portraits of the Tsar in a prominent location. They recommended to liquidate the society, but Kovno Governor Petr Verevkin defended Saulė.

=== Teachers' courses ===
==== History ====
Since only the Veiveriai Teachers' Seminary admitted Lithuanian students, there was a lack of Lithuanian-speaking teachers. Saulė organized courses for teachers (they were officially approved in October 1907). In 1910, Tsarist authorities attempted to close the school because they found out that its alumni Matas Šalčius delivered a speech criticizing Russification at a teacher's conference in Saint Petersburg.

From 1908 to 1914, 545 people attended the courses and 106 graduated. Graduates were not licensed by the Tsarist authorities and had troubles finding employment in government schools. Thus, many graduates had to seek employment at Saulė or other private schools. By 1918, the number of graduates increased to about 200. During World War I, the courses were first evacuated to Vilnius and then to Voronezh where the Lithuanian Society for the Relief of War Sufferers organized a number of Lithuanian schools.

In 1918, the courses returned to Lithuania and were reorganized as the Saulė Teachers' Seminary. Starting in 1923, the seminary admitted only girls. To combat teacher shortages in independent Lithuania, Saulė also organized two-year teachers' courses in Jurbarkas, Vilkija, Utena, and Žagarė. In 1928, the seminary had 150 students. It was closed in 1936.

==== Curriculum ====
It was the first pedagogical school in Lithuania that admitted women. The education lasted three years. Pre-war curriculum included religion, languages (Russian, Lithuanian, French, Latin), math (arithmetic, algebra, geometry), nature, hygiene, history, geography, penmanship, drawing, singing, and pedagogy. Students could practice teaching at a primary school that was attached to the courses in 1908. The classes were taught in Russian (except for religion and Lithuanian language and history). Tuition cost 40 to 60 rubles per year, with additional 15 rubles per month for dormitory, which was a relatively large sum at the time. Students joined Lithuanian choirs directed by Juozas Naujalis or Stasys Šimkus. They were also active in the Daina Society. In interwar Lithuania, students were active in Ateitis, Union for the Liberation of Vilnius, and girl scouts.

Juozas Vokietaitis was the director of the teachers' courses until 1926. Lecturers at the courses included Juozas Balčikonis, Sofija Kymantaitė-Čiurlionienė, Rokas Šliūpas, Juozas Damijonaitis, Stasys Matijošaitis, and Magdalena Galdikienė. Notable alumni of the courses included Matas Šalčius, Kazys Šimonis, Adelė Nezabitauskaitė-Galaunienė, and others.

=== Bookkeeping courses ===
In the early 20th century, Lithuanians started a number of credit and trade cooperatives, but they lacked educated workers. Therefore, Saulė Society established bookkeeping courses in 1909. The courses were directed by priest Kazimieras Prapuolenis. Both men and women were admitted. Initially, the courses were taught in Russian, but Lithuanian was introduced for the 1911–1912 school year. The curriculum included arithmetic, bookkeeping, commercial correspondence, trade, and calligraphy. The education lasted one year. The tuition was 100 rubles per year. During World War I, the courses were also evacuated to Voronezh.

=== Headquarters in Kaunas ===
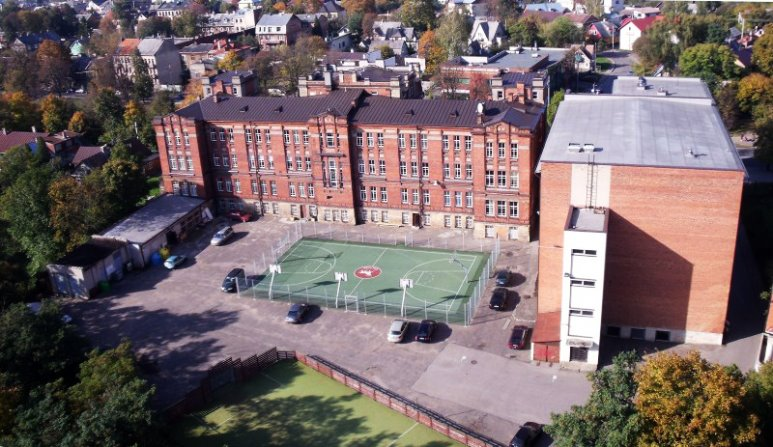
Saulė headquarters in Kaunas

Saulė did not have its own premises in Kaunas and rented a house for 4,000 rubles per year. In spring 1911, priest Konstantinas Olšauskas invited Juozas Tumas-Vaižgantas to visit Lithuanian American communities and collect donations for the construction of the headquarters of the Saulė Society. They toured 55 Lithuanian American communities for three months and collected about $19,000 (equivalent to $657,000 in 2025) or 34,000 rubles. More donations were collected in Lithuania and construction started in spring 1912. The three-storey brick building at a cost of 155,000 rubles was completed in Žaliakalnis in 1914. It was the first building in Lithuania built using funds raised from the public.

The building had modern conveniences: central heating, local water supply and sewage, electricity, and a telephone. The building was enlarged in 1925 based on a project by architect Edmundas Alfonsas Frykas. At the same time, reliefs of Simonas Daukantas and Motiejus Valančius by sculptor Vincas Grybas were incorporated into the façade.

The building housed several educational institutions: teachers' seminary, the first music school in Lithuania (established in 1919, director Juozas Naujalis), the first girls' progymnasium (established in 1923), two primary schools, and a kindergarten. The building also had a chapel of Saint Casimir. The top floor was used as a dormitory, while the basement housed a kitchen, canteen, laundry, and other utility rooms.

== Disestablishment ==
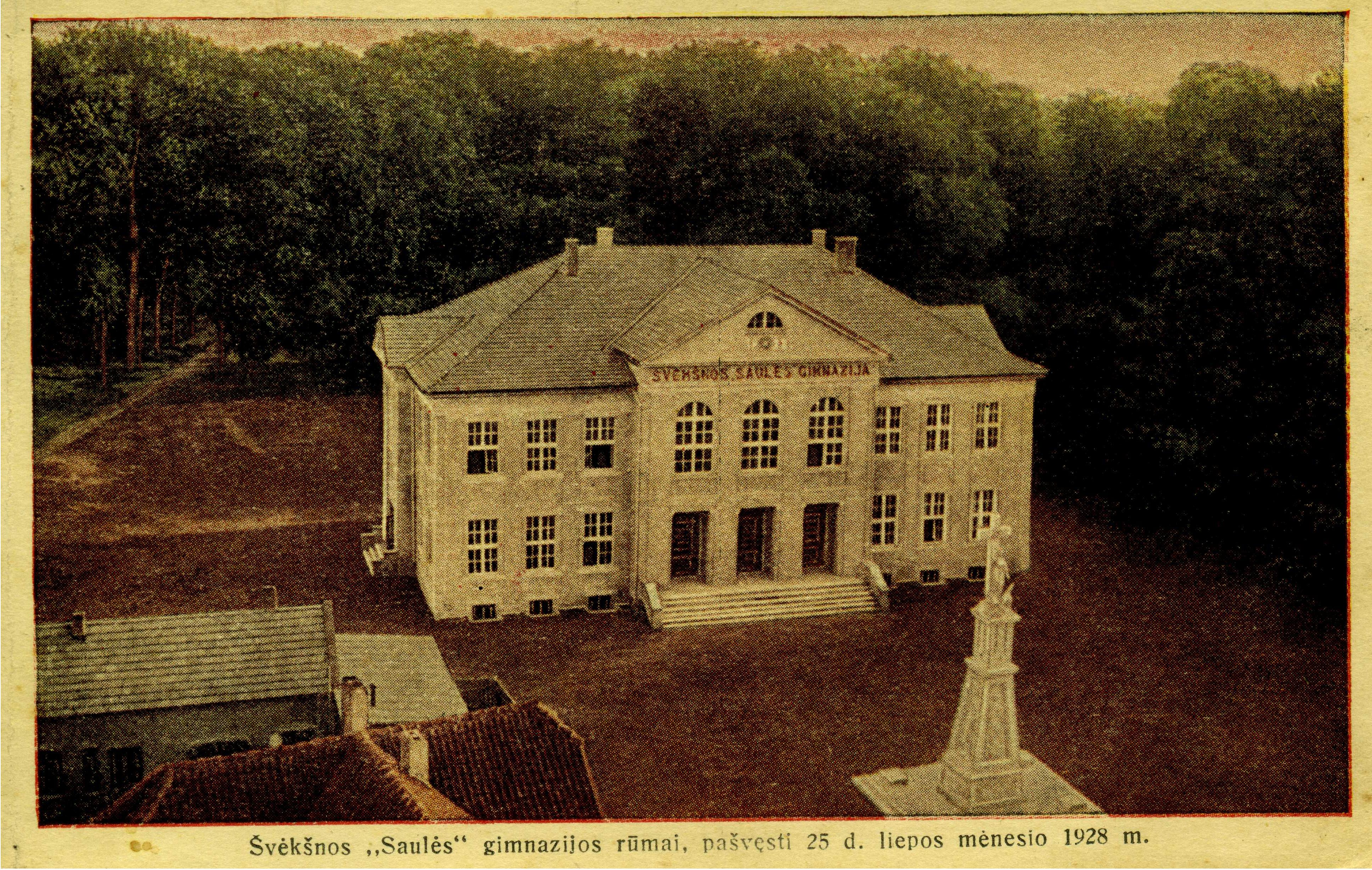
Saulė Gymnasium in Švėkšna built in 1925

In independent Lithuania, the need for private schools diminished and Saulė struggled to raise funds. The government provided up to 65% of Catholic school funding. Many schools of the Saulė Society were nationalized after the December 1926 coup d'état that brought President Antanas Smetona to power. It was an intentional effort by the authoritarian regime of Smetona to reduce the influence of the Catholic Church and, by extension, of his main political opponent the Lithuanian Christian Democratic Party.

In 1940, the society was left with only three schools: a gymnasium in Švėkšna, a progymnasium in Šeduva, and a primary school in Kaunas. The society was fully liquidated after the Soviet occupation of Lithuania in 1940.

== Bibliography ==
- Balkus, Mindaugas (2014). "Tautinis ir pilietinis ugdymas Kauno mergaičių mokytojų seminarijose 1918–1936 m." Kauno istorijos metraštis (in Lithuanian). 14: 79–91. ISSN 1822-2617.
- Jonkaitytė-Gratkauskienė, Ona (1935). "Gyvenimo knygos lapus besklaidant". Moteris (in Lithuanian). 3 (XV).
- Pukienė, Vida (1994). Lietuvių švietimo draugijos XX amžiaus pradžioje (1906–1915 metais) (in Lithuanian). A. Varno personalinė įmonė. ISBN 9986-491-11-8.
- Pukienė, Vida (2013). Prelatas Konstantinas Olšauskas: visuomenės veikėjo tragedija (PDF) (in Lithuanian). Edukologija. ISBN 978-9955-20-884-6. Archived from the original (PDF) on 2018-08-11.
- Rinkšelis, Žilvinas. ""Saulės" gimnazija Kaune (Išlikęs, k.k.v.r. 10710)". Architektūros ir urbanistikos tyrimų centras (in Lithuanian). KTU Architektūros ir statybos institutas.
- Tamakauskas, Zigmas (5 July 2006). "Juozas Vokietaitis – lietuviškos mokyklos kūrėjas". XXI amžius (in Lithuanian). 51 (1451). ISSN 2029-3445.
- Virvičienė, Aušra (30 March 2013). "Naujas Lietuvių švietimo draugijos "Rytas" šimtmetis". Voruta (in Lithuanian). 7 (771). ISSN 2029-3534.
