= Tūbelis =

- Lithuanian surname
- m.: Tūbelis
- f.: (unmarried): Tūbelytė
- f.: (married): Tūbelienė

Tūbelis is a Lithuanian surname. Notable people with the surname include:

- Ąžuolas Tubelis (born 2002), Lithuanian basketball player
- Jadvyga Tūbelienė (1891–1988), one of the founders of the Lithuanian Women's Council, writer, journalist
- Juozas Tūbelis (1882–1939), Prime Minister of Lithuania
- Marija Rima Tūbelytė-Kuhlmann (1923–2014), Lithuanian painter, writer, poet
