= Magdalena Galdikienė =

Lithuanian politician (1891–1979)

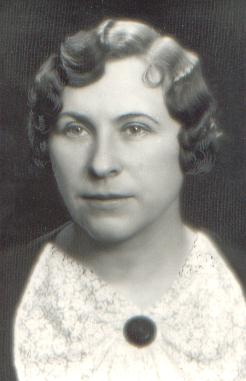
- Born: Magdalena Draugelytė; 26 September 1891; Bardauskai, Suwałki Governorate, Congress Poland
- Died: 22 May 1979 (aged 87); Putnam, Connecticut
- Resting place: Brooklyn, New York
- Other names: 'Feminist' and 'Mokytoja M. D.'
- Occupations: Teacher, editor, and politician
- Political party: Lithuanian Christian Democratic Party
- Board member of: Lithuanian Catholic Women's Organization
- Spouse: Adomas Galdikas
- Relatives: Brother Eliziejus Draugelis

Magdalena Galdikienė née Draugelytė (26 September 1891 – 22 May 1979) was a Lithuanian Catholic feminist, teacher, and politician. For two decades, she chaired the Lithuanian Catholic Women's Organization (Lithuanian: Lietuvių katalikių moterų draugija or LKMD), the largest women's organization in interwar Lithuania. She was the first to celebrate Mother's Day in Lithuania in 1928. She was elected to the Constituent Assembly of Lithuania in May 1920 and all subsequent Seimas (parliaments) until the 1926 coup d'état. After World War II, Galdikienė fled to the United States where she devoted herself to supporting, promoting, and preserving the art of her husband, the painter Adomas Galdikas.

== Early life and education ==
Magdalena Galdikienė was born on 26 September 1891 in the village of Bardauskai located near Keturvalakiai in then Congress Poland, a client state of the Russian Empire, and now in Lithuania. Her father, an alumnus of the Veiveriai Teachers' Seminary, taught at the local primary school. Out of twelve children, seven reached adulthood and all received education. Two of her brothers became priests, and a brother, Eliziejus Draugelis, became Minister of Foreign Affairs of independent Lithuania. She attended the girls' gymnasium in Marijampolė, graduating in 1910. Already as a high school student, she helped her sister to organize the Marijampolė chapter of the Lithuanian Catholic Women's Organization (LKMD) in 1908.

She then taught at a Lithuanian school in Liepāja for a year before transferring to the girls' agricultural school in Obeliai. In 1912, she enrolled at the Higher Pedagogy School in Saint Petersburg. There she organized a chapter of Ateitis, a Lithuanian Catholic youth organization. In one of the meetings of this chapter, she met her future husband, painter Adomas Galdikas. At the outbreak of World War I, she was attending courses held by Paul Natorp at the University of Marburg, but managed to return to Saint Petersburg. After graduating in 1915, she was sent for mandatory practice at a public girls' school in Kainsk (now Kuybyshev, Novosibirsk Oblast) then transferred to Tambov to teach at a Lithuanian school maintained by the Žiburys Society. In 1917, she married Galdikas; they had no children.

== Career ==
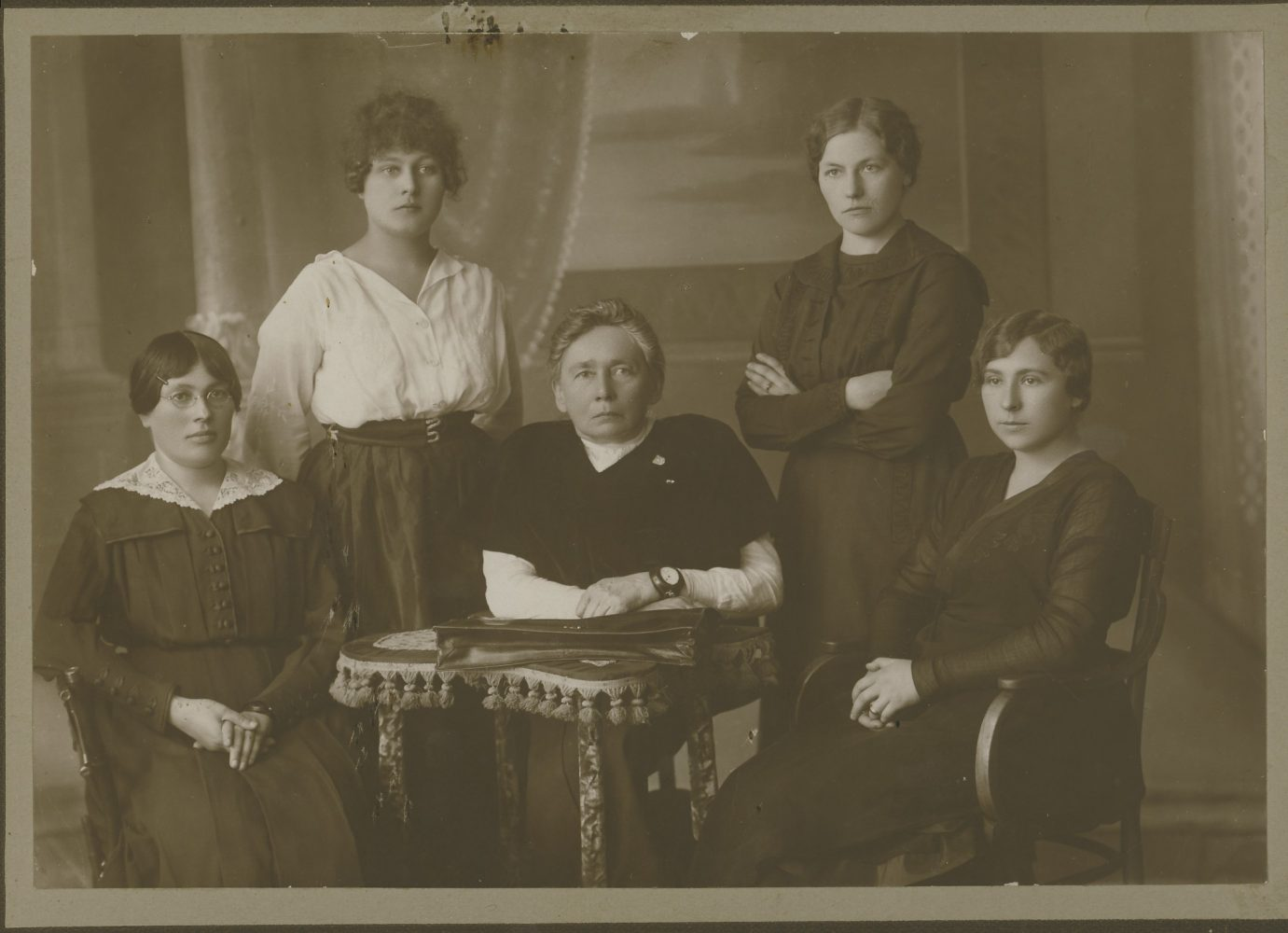
Galdikienė (right) and Gabrielė Petkevičaitė-Bitė (center) with other women delegates of the Constituent Assembly of Lithuania

After Lithuania gained its independence at the end of World War I, Galdikienė returned to Lithuania in 1918 and settled in Kaunas. She worked as a teacher at a gymnasium and a seminary of the Saulė Society and became active in Lithuanian cultural and political life. She taught the German language and was the headteacher at the Girls Teachers' Seminary of the Holy Christ's Heart Congregation from 1923 to 1936 and at the Gymnasium of the Holy Christ's Heart Congregation from 1936 to 1940. In total, she taught for 27 years.

She was elected to the council of the Kaunas City Municipality in 1919. As a member of the Lithuanian Christian Democratic Party, she was elected to the Constituent Assembly of Lithuania in May 1920. Galdikienė was reelected to the subsequent Parliaments and served until the 1926 coup d'état. In the parliament, she advocated equal rights for men and women and succeeded in passing amendments to the Civil Code and other laws equalizing inheritance and children's custody rights and establishing separate passports for women who were not dependent on their husband's or father's papers. She further lobbied for paid maternity leave and state pensions for widows. She was a member of several parliamentary commissions, including on education and social security as well as secretary in the Second Seimas and vice-chair in the Third Seimas.

When the LKMD was reestablished in 1919, she became its chair and, with a brief break from 1927 to 1928, headed the organization until it was suppressed by the new Soviet regime in 1940. Under her leadership, the organization grew to 42,000 members and 410 chapters. From 1922 to 1930, she also served as the editor of its monthly magazine Moteris (Woman), the first Lithuanian magazine oriented towards women. She also lobbied to establish women's sections in other newspapers and journals and contributed articles to many other publications, including Ūkininkas, Laisvė, and Lietuvaitė. In 1923, she initiated the Union of Lithuanian Catholic Women's Organizations (Lietuvos katalikių moterų organizacijų sąjunga) or LKMOS, an umbrella organization of Catholic-minded women's organizations in Lithuania. LKMOS became a member of the World Union of Catholic Women's Organisations. In 1928, together with students of the University of Lithuania, Galdikienė celebrated the first Mother's Day in Lithuania. She was an active member of another fifteen organizations and committees.

== Emigration ==
Galdikienė remained in Lithuania through the initial Soviet occupation and the consequent German occupation during World War II. She worked as a teacher at the Kaunas Applied Art Institute and Kaunas Higher Technical School. As Soviet troops advanced on Lithuania in summer 1944, Galdikienė, who was ill at the time, and her husband fled with very few belongings to Bonn and Freiburg im Breisgau in Germany. There she renewed her public work and reestablished both LKMD and LKMOS. Galdikienė moved to Paris in 1947 and reorganized LKMOS into the World Union of Lithuanian Catholic Women's Organizations (Pasaulio lietuvių katalikių moterų organizacijų sąjunga) which rejoined the World Union of Catholic Women's Organisations in 1951. She chaired this organization until 1968.

Galdikienė moved to the United States in 1952. She completed evening courses and got a job at a bank to financially provide for her husband who devoted his time to painting. They struggled financially, living in an unheated apartment for seven years. As Galdikas' art became more recognized and valued, their financial situation improved and they were able to buy their own home. After his death in 1969, Galdikienė organized the publication of English- and Lithuanian-language albums of Galdikas' works and a small gallery of his works. The gallery was located at the Lithuanian Cultural Center near Highland Park in Brooklyn. She spent the last years of her life in a nursing home of the Sisters of the Immaculate Conception of the Blessed Virgin Mary in Putnam, Connecticut. There she also established a museum that displayed about 200 of Galdikas' works.
