= Vytautas Andrius Graičiūnas =

Vytautas Andrius Graičiūnas (August 17, 1898 in Chicago – January 9, 1952 in Olzheras, Siberia) was a Lithuanian American management theorist, management consultant, and engineer, and was a known expert in his field.

== Biography ==
Born to Lithuanian immigrants, he studied at the University of Chicago. During World War I he served in France. After coming back in 1919, he became interested in management and continued his studies at the Illinois Institute of Technology.

In 1927 he came to Lithuania and worked at factories in Kaunas. Soon he started traveling and working across Europe. Until 1935 he worked as a consultant and helped to establish large companies in Barcelona, Brussels, Copenhagen, London, and Milan. During this period he published his classic study printed in Geneva, Relationship in Organization in 1933. Soon other editions appeared in the United States. He mathematically proved that a manager should not have more than four to five subordinates. He came up with the following formula to express the total number of relationships between a boss and his or her subordinates:

N [(2^{N}/2) + N - 1], where N is the number of subordinates.

When the number of subordinates increases, the number of relationships increases exponentially; at five subordinates the number of relationships is 100, at ten, 5,210. Many scientists expanded or criticized the theory; among them was Herbert A. Simon.

In 1935, Graičiūnas returned to Lithuania, where he worked as an engineer, and management consultant at various state and private institutions, including the Ministry of Defense, Lithuanian aviation, the Lithuanian State Theatre, and the Lithuanian Film Company. He also lectured at the Vytautas Magnus University and was awarded the Commander's Cross of the Order of the Lithuanian Grand Duke Gediminas. During World War II Graičiūnas decided to remain in Lithuania despite clear threats of the occupation by the Soviet Union.

In 1951 while visiting Moscow with a group of students he visited the embassy of the United States where he was told that only he could leave the Soviet Union because his wife, actor Unė Babickaitė, did not have U.S. citizenship. After this incident, Graičiūnas and his wife were arrested for espionage and anti-Soviet activities, and were tried and sentenced to several years in a gulag. He died the following year under unclear circumstances. His wife, after Joseph Stalin's death in 1953, got her sentence reduced and returned to Kaunas.

== See also ==
- List of business theorists
