= Babitsky =

Babitsky, feminine: Babitskaya is a Russian-language surname, a counterpart of Polish surname Babicki and Lithuanian Babickas. Notable people with the surname include:

- Andrei Babitsky Russian journalist
- Arthur Harold Babitsky, better known as Art Babbitt, American animator
