= Lithuanian Red Cross Society =

Humanitarian organization in Lithuania

- Lietuvos Raudonasis kryžius
- Founded: 1919
- Founders: Rokas Šliūpas, Jurgis Alekna and Vladas Ingelevičius
- Type: Non-profit organisation
- Purpose: Humanitarian Aid
- Headquarters: Konstitucijos ave. 7A, PC Europa, III a. Vilnius, LT-09307
- Location: Lithuania
- Affiliations: International Committee of the Red Cross; International Federation of Red Cross and Red Crescent Societies
- Website: redcross.lt

The Lithuanian Red Cross (Lithuanian: Lietuvos Raudonasis kryžius) was founded in 1919. It was reestablished after the collapse of the Soviet Union. The Seimas, the Lithuanian parliament, passed a Red Cross law in 2000. The society has its headquarters in Vilnius, the capital of Lithuania.

The society's departments include: the Financial Department, the First Aid Training Department, the Humanitarian Aid Department, the International Humanitarian Law Department, the Refugee Department, the Social Welfare Department, the Tracing Department, and the Youth Department.

== History ==
Before World War I, a branch of the Russian Red Cross was active in Lithuania, organising courses for nurses. In 1919, the independent Lithuanian Red Cross was established on the joint initiative of Rokas Šliūpas, Jurgis Alekna and Vladas Ingelevičius.

In 1919, it was decided that two Red Cross hospitals should be established in Kaunas and one in Panevėžys, with a further hospital being opened in Klaipėda in 1932. Schools of the Sisters of Mercy were set up in 1919 and 1932, the latter in Klaipėda. In 1922, a laboratory for orthopaedic equipment was opened in Kaunas.

In 1924, the initiative of the Lithuanian Red Cross resulted in the acquisition of the Birštonas spa from private owners, the installation of mud baths, and the construction of sanatoriums. In 1932, the first tuberculosis sanatorium in Lithuania was opened in Aukštoji Panemunė.

In 1934, a blood transfusion facility was opened at the Kaunas Red Cross Hospital, and in 1937, the Kaunas ambulance station was established, with branches in Šiauliai and Panevėžys. Following the outbreak of World War II and the return of Vilnius to Lithuania in 1939, the Red Cross was entrusted with the care of Polish war refugees and interned soldiers, as well as the inhabitants of Vilnius and the Vilnius region. In 1940, a Red Cross hospital, an ambulance station, and a school for the Sisters of Mercy were established in Vilnius.

== Chairpersons ==
The society was chaired by:

- Rokas Šliūpas (1919–1932)
- Aloyzas Petrikas (1932–1938)
- Jurgis Alekna (1938–1940)
- Antanas Garmus (1940–1941)
- Vladas Ingelevičius (1941–1944)
- Vytautas Girdzijauskas (1944–1947)
- Viktoras Brigmanas (1947–1961)
- Vytautas A. Kleiza (1961–1967)
- Danutė Grybauskienė (1967–1984)
- Juozas Šapoka (1984–1994)
- R. Budrys (1994–1996)
- A. Blažys (1996–2004)
- A. Jankus (2004–2008)
- Konstantinas Dobrovolskis (2008–2015)
- Gediminas Almantas (since 2015)
