= Rokas Šliūpas =

Lithuanian physician (1865–1959)

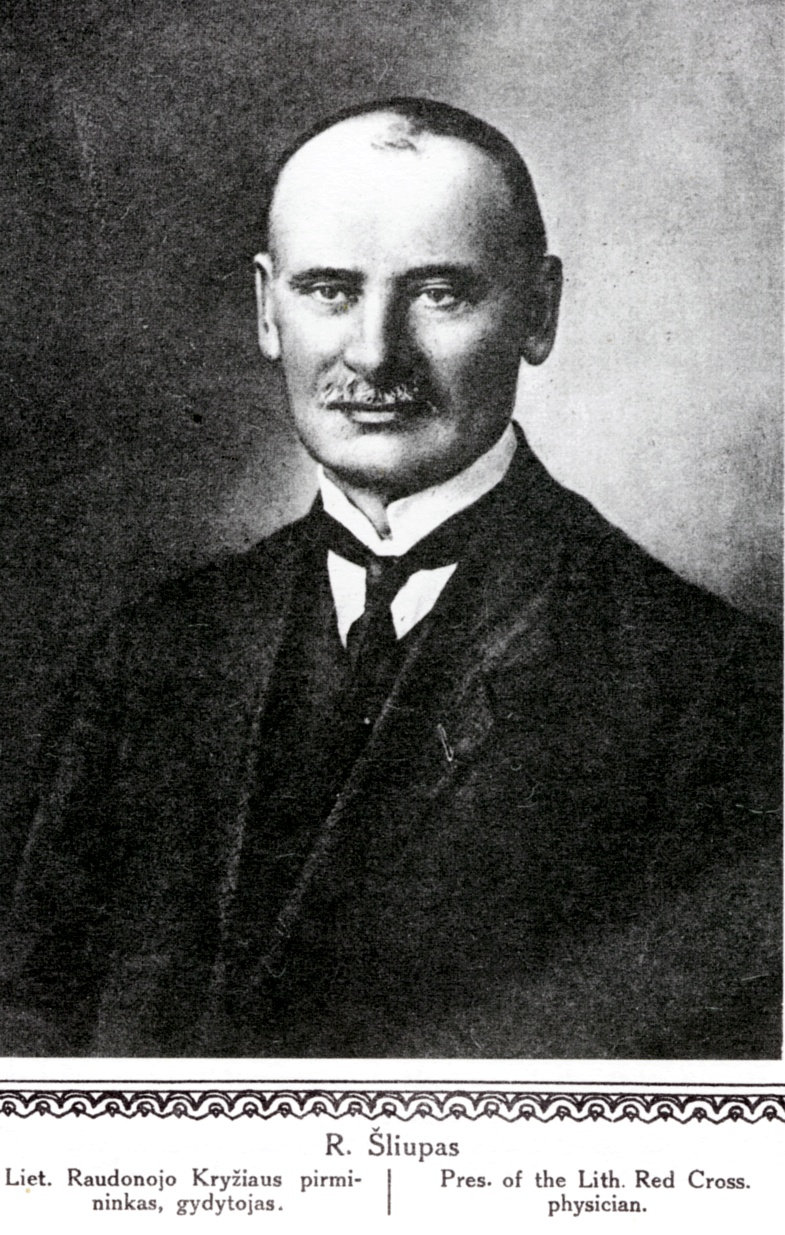
- Rokas Šliūpas in Album of Lithuania (1921)
- Born: 2 June 1865; Rakandžiai, Russian Empire
- Died: 26 May 1959 (aged 93); Garliava, Lithuanian SSR
- Education: Saint Petersburg University; Imperial Moscow University
- Occupation: Physician
- Board member of: Daina Society; Lithuanian Red Cross
- Relatives: Brother Jonas Šliūpas

Rokas Šliūpas (2 June 1865 – 26 May 1959) was a Lithuanian physician, co-founder and chairman of the Lithuanian Red Cross from 1919 to 1932.

Educated in Saint Petersburg and Moscow, Šliūpas began a private medical practice in Ariogala. At the same time, he actively supported Lithuanian book smugglers and was arrested by the Tsarist police in 1900 and exiled to Kazan. As a doctor, he was mobilized by the Imperial Russian Army during the Russo-Japanese War in 1904–1905 and World War I in 1914–1918. In Lithuania, he was an active participant in the Lithuanian National Revival, organizing various societies including the cultural Daina Society (which he chaired in 1904–1906) and the educational Saulė Society.

He became the first chairman of the Lithuanian Red Cross and worked to establish three hospitals in 1919, organize health care for prisoners of war and war refugees in the difficult and chaotic post-war years. Šliūpas worked to establish Birštonas as a spa town, build a new hospital in Klaipėda (opened in 1933) and a tuberculosis sanatorium in Panemunė (opened in 1932). In 1932, he resigned as chairman of the Lithuanian Red Cross due to disagreements with the authoritarian regime of President Antanas Smetona and devoted his time to his private medical practice.

== Early life and education ==
Šliūpas was born in a well-off family in Rakandžiai near Gruzdžiai, then part of the Russian Empire, on 2 June 1865. According to the memoirs of his brother, a noted Lithuania activist Jonas Šliūpas, the family told stories about their wealthy ancestors who traced back to the time of Grand Duke Vytautas (died in 1430). His uncle Aloyzas attended Kražiai College and later became a priest. With his uncle's help, Šliūpas received basic education and got admitted to the Mitau Gymnasium (present-day Latvia) in 1874. At the gymnasium, Šliūpas became interested in Lithuanian language and culture and, when his brother Jonas became editor of Aušra newspaper, helped distribute the illegal Lithuanian press.

In 1884, Šliūpas graduated from the gymnasium and began biology studies at the Saint Petersburg University. There he continued to work for the Lithuanian causes, handwriting Lithuanian-language newsletter Žinių nešėjas (Carrier of News). He worked with Vincas Kudirka on establishing Varpas, a Lithuanian-language newspaper. Šliūpas helped raise funds and visited publisher Martynas Jankus in East Prussia. After the graduation in 1889, Šliūpas decided to study medicine at the Imperial Moscow University. There, he was roommate and close friends with Kazys Grinius, future President of Lithuania. Šliūpas graduated with a medical degree in 1894.

== Doctor and activist ==
In 1891–1893, he helped combat a cholera outbreak as a result of the Russian famine of 1891–1892. After the graduation, he briefly worked at the clinics of the University of Königsberg before taking up a private practice in Ariogala. He actively supported Lithuanian book smugglers who transported and distributed the banned Lithuanian publications. He was implicated in the large case against Lithuanian activists and book smugglers in 1900 (known as Liudas Vaineikis case) and was sentenced to two years of exile in February 1902. He was exiled to Kazan. He briefly returned to Lithuania in 1904 but was mobilized to serve as a medic in the Russo-Japanese War, including in the Battle of Mukden.

He returned to Lithuania and settled in Garliava where he lived until his death. The Lithuanian press ban was lifted in 1904 and Lithuanians were allowed to organize their own cultural societies. Šliūpas became an active organizer. He helped organize and in 1904–1906 chaired the Daina Society which organized concerts and theater performances. He also helped organize the Saulė Society which established Lithuanian-language schools and the Lithuanian Scientific Society which promoted scholarly research, and supported Ateitis and Pavasaris magazines for Catholic youth. In 1910, together with Saliamonas Banaitis and others he organized the consumers' co-operative Nemunas and was its chairman in 1910–1914.

At the outbreak of World War I in 1914, he was mobilized again. He directed a mobile lazaretto organized by the Kaunas Red Cross Hospital, but as a politically unreliable activist he was reassigned to interior of Russia. He returned to Lithuania in 1918 becoming teacher of hygiene at the Kaunas Priest Seminary and a deputy of the Council of Lithuania organizing local administration in Kaunas area. He was also a board member of a trade union of electrification companies. In 1922, he became chairman of the state examination commission of physicians. Unlike many other activists of the time, Šliūpas was not keen on writing and contributed only a couple articles to the Lithuanian press.

== Red Cross ==
In January 1919, Šliūpas and others founded the Lithuanian Red Cross Society. He became the first chairman of the society and worked to reopen and restore the Kaunas Red Cross Hospital, establish another hospital in Kaunas for infectious diseases, and open a new hospital in Panevėžys. During 1919, the three hospitals treated some 4,000 patients. The Red Cross Society organized chapters in cities and towns across Lithuania, established training courses for nurses and midwives, helped negotiate prisoner of war exchanges, arranged health checks for war refugees returning to Lithuania, provided humanitarian aid to Lithuanian prisoners and deportees in Russia, treated wounded soldiers of the Lithuanian Wars of Independence. The Lithuanian Red Cross became a recognized member of the International Committee of the Red Cross in August 1923. In 1924, the society started publishing Žiburėlis magazine for children which was edited by Šliūpas and others. Šliūpas worked to establish Birštonas as a spa town, build a new hospital in Klaipėda (opened in 1933) and a tuberculosis sanatorium in Panemunė (opened in 1932). In 1932, Šliūpas resigned as chairman of the Lithuanian Red Cross due to disagreements with the authoritarian regime of President Antanas Smetona. In April 1932, President Smetona adopted a law regulating the Lithuanian Red Cross – it became accountable to the Ministry of the Interior and was assigned a special government inspector who had broad powers to interfere in the society's activities.

== Later life ==
After the resignation from the Lithuanian Red Cross, Šliūpas lived in Garliava (he moved to nearby Pagiriai in 1939) and had a private medical practice. After World War II, his three daughters retreated ahead of the advancing Red Army and eventually settled in the United States. While his son Mindaugas Šliūpas, member of the Lithuania men's national basketball team, was arrested and deported to Siberia in 1945, he managed to avoid Soviet repressions and worked as a director of the Garliava ambulatory in 1945–1949 and as vaccine administrator in 1949–1951. He died in 1959 at the age of 93.

He was awarded Red Cross medals by Germany, Latvia, Estonia. In 1999, the Lithuanian Red Cross established the Rokas Šliūpas Award. In 2012, the Garliava polyclinic was renamed in honor of Rokas Šliūpas.
