= Marija Rima Tūbelytė-Kuhlmann =

Lithuanian painter, poet and writer

- Born: November 2, 1923; Kaunas, Lithuania
- Died: May 3, 2014 (aged 90); St. Petersburg Beach, Florida
- Burial place: Panemunės Cemetery, Kaunas
- Education: University of Chicago
- Occupations: Artist and writer
- Known for: Painting
- Style: Primitivism
- Spouse: Kurt Kuhlmann
- Parents: Juozas Tūbelis (father); Jadvyga Tūbelienė (mother)

Marija Rima Tūbelytė-Kuhlmann (November 2, 1923 – May 3, 2014) was a Lithuanian painter, writer, poet and daughter of Jadvyga Tūbelienė and Juozas Tūbelis.

== Biography ==
=== Early life in Lithuania (1923–1940) ===
Marija Tūbelytė was born November 2, 1923, in Kaunas, Lithuania to Juozas Tūbelis and Jadvyga Tūbelienė into a family in interwar Lithuania.

As Tūbelytė had a disability due to a difficult birth, she was home schooled. Her mother invited Petras Kalpokas to give Tūbelytė private drawing lessons which left a lasting impression on her.

When she was ten years old, her parents built a house, designed by architect Feliksas Vizbaras, on the uppermost terrace of the Žaliakalnis hillside. The building now houses the Kaunas Art Gymnasium.

Her father died on September 30, 1939.

=== Fleeing Lithuania (1940–1941) ===
On June 17, 1940, Tūbelytė and her mother fled Lithuania, just days after the Soviet occupation. Departing from Lithuania, the family was in close contact with Marija's aunt, Sofija Smetonienė and uncle President Antanas Smetona. They went to stay with the Smetonas at the Hunters' Heights (Gästeheim Jägerhöhe) at the Schwenzait resort in the Masurian Lakes area of Poland. They were there for the summer of 1940.

Tūbelytė and her mother then went to Berlin from where they flew to Madrid (via Frankfurt am Main, Lyon and Barcelona) and then took a train to Lisbon. They spent several months in Lisbon waiting for a ship to the United States. In December 1940, they departed Lisbon bound for Argentina. From Argentina, they sailed to New York City in December 1940. On March 13, Tūbelytė attended the reception of Smetona's arrival in the United States at The Pierre Hotel in New York. In September 1941, Tūbelytė and her mother lived in Cleveland.

=== In the US (1941–1968) ===
==== Art studies and marriage ====
Marija started university in 1941 attending the College of Wooster in Ohio. Later she received a Lithuanian scholarship to study art at the University of Chicago in 1943. She earned a Bachelor's degree in art history and in 1945, a Master of Arts in history.

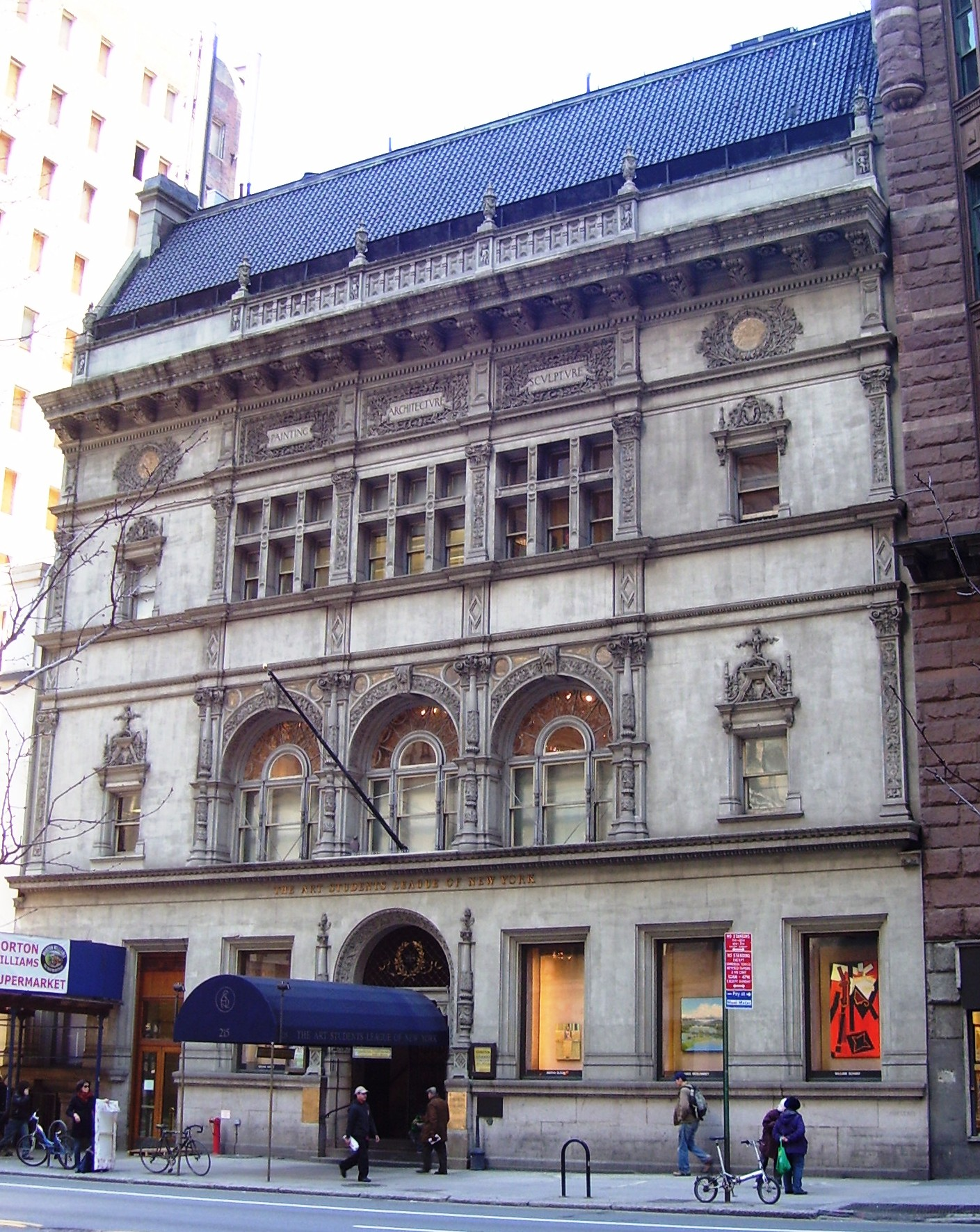
The building of the Art Students League at 215 West 57th Street

Her mother encouraged her not only to study art, but to start painting too. Tūbelytė studied at the Art Students League of New York. Tūbelytė later told her son that if she had not been encouraged by her mother, she might not have discovered this talent at all.

At a foreign students' mixer at Columbia University, Tūbelytė met Kurt Kuhlmann, a graduate student at the university. In 1948, Tūbelytė and Kuhlmann married and they had one child, Peter Kuhlmann, born in New York.

On May 2, 1950, the United States Congress granted Tūbelytė and her mother US citizenship on an exceptional basis.

==== Return to painting ====
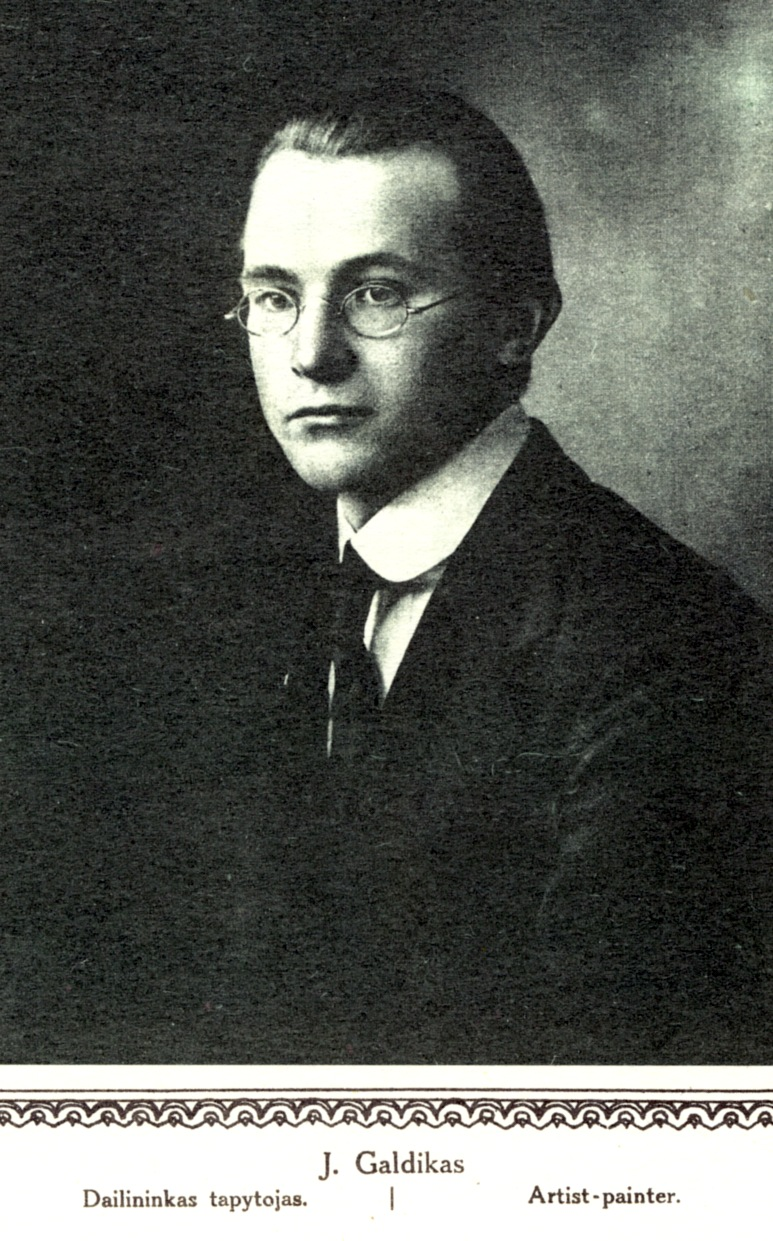
Adomas Galdikas

Married and a mother, Tūbelytė pushed painting aside for a while. However, in 1955, she tried to return to work again. Her painting was encouraged by friends, first of all Danutė Jasaitytė, a childhood friend who had married the son of the French avant-garde artist Francis Picabia. Jasaitytė promised to bring the artist Adomas Galdikas, who had emigrated to the U.S., to review her paintings. Galdikas liked the still imperfect pictures of Marija. Especially her flowers. He told her:

"Landscapes like these can be painted by others, but flowers like these are very rare. This is already very, very rare. There was such straightforwardness, such simplicity, they repeated." Then he took off his thick glasses, pulled me by the hand, and exclaimed, "What a miracle that Juozas Tūbelis' daughter began painting!"

In 1957, Tūbelytė and her family moved from New York to Portland, Oregon. She set up a painting studio at home. In order to make some money from her work, Tūbelytė started painting portraits. The first period of her work in Portland, which lasted for a decade (1957–1967), was very intense. She was inspired by the diverse and stunning landscape of the vast state of Oregon, with its tall dark spruces and cone-shaped mountains.

The successful creative period was crowned in 1963, when she hosted a solo exhibition of her work at the University of Portland. At the same time, several of her still lifes with flowers were included in group exhibitions at the Portland Museum of Art. In 1965, an exhibition of her paintings was held at the town hall in St. Helens, Oregon.

=== Taiwan and Japan (1968–1984) ===
In 1968 the family moved to Taiwan, as Tūbelytė's husband, Kurt Kuhlmann, being an engineer, worked on various projects around the world.

Eastern culture and art made an impact on Tūbelytė's work. Her palette became brighter, strokes more subtle, outlines of objects less dark and expressive. Because oil paints seemed too rough to convey details of the Chinese landscape, she started painting with acrylic paints. In 1970, Tūbelytė held a personal exhibition at The Magic Touch Gallery in Taipei. She later participated in several group exhibitions in this gallery.

Between 1971 and 1979, the family lived in Kobe, Japan. Tūbelytė began collaborating with Osaka's Katzura Gallery, and from 1974 to 1978 she held exhibitions at art galleries in Kyoto, Wakayama, Hiroshima, Osaka and Nagoya. Her paintings have also been exhibited at the American Club in Tokyo and the Kobe Club. In 1978, the German Cultural Centre in Taiwan organized an exhibition of Marija's paintings. In 1978 she selected 60 of her best paintings and sent them to the United States.

Tūbelytė wrote letters to the editors of the English-language newspapers in Japan condemning the Soviet occupation of the Baltics, and challenging certain articles that had a pro-Soviet slant.

After Japan, the family moved back to Taiwan. Several solo exhibitions were held at the American Club Taipei (1980, 1982, 1984). Exhibitions were held in Los Angeles, Cleveland, and Chicago.

=== St. Petersburg Beach, Florida (1984–2014) ===
In 1984, Tūbelytė and her family returned to the United States and settled in St. Petersburg Beach, Florida, where there was a large Lithuanian community.

In 1987, Tūbelytė held a solo exhibit at the Lithuanian Club in St. Petersburg. In 1988, she joined the Sun Tan Gallery, a group of Florida artists, and exhibited several new works each year.

After Lithuania regained its independence, Tūbelytė revisited Lithuania in 1991. In 1992, she was granted Lithuanian citizenship and he bought an apartment in Vilnius in 1995. She and spent three months there every year. She also became a member of the Lithuanian Artists' Union and the Lithuanian Writers' Union.

Tūbelytė died on May 3, 2014, in St. Petersburg Beach. A memorial service was held for her on October 15, 2014, in the Kaunas Cathedral Basilica. She was buried, beside her father, Juozas Tūbelis, in Panemunė Cemetery, Kaunas.

== Painting ==
Marija created several hundred paintings during her lifetime, mostly landscapes, still-lives and portraits. Most of them were in the primitivist style.

In 2017, her son donated the bulk of his mother's painting collection to the M. K. Čiurlionis National Art Gallery in Kaunas. Much of the rest of her work is spread around the world in private collections.

== Writing ==
Tūbelytė wrote short romantic stories for women's and literary magazines. She wrote tales to the Lithuanian press in the United States. In Lithuanian, the collection of short stories Intruder (1986), the story Amal and the novel Svaigulys (1994) were published. Some poems were published in literary journals.
