= Jonas Bendorius =

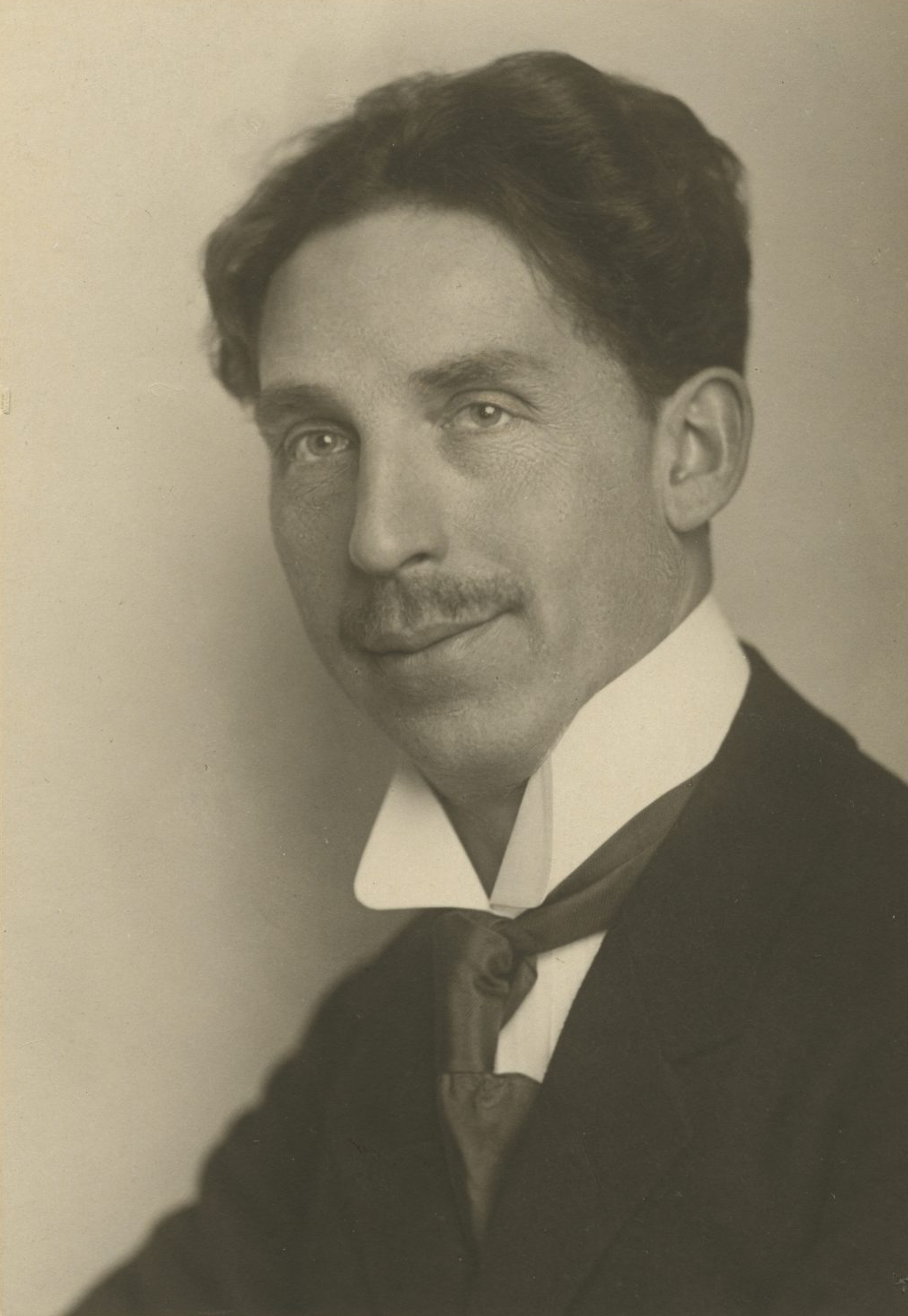
- Bendorius in 1923
- Born: Jonas Bendoravičius; August 15, 1889; Skaisčiai, Congress Poland, Russian Empire
- Died: June 27, 1954 (aged 64); Palanga, Lithuanian SSR
- Resting place: Rasos Cemetery
- Occupations: Composer, choirmaster

Jonas Bendorius (born Bendoravičius; 15 August [O.S. 3 August] 1889 – 27 June 1954) was a Lithuanian composer, choirmaster, organist, and music educator. Bendorius's harmonized Lithuanian folk songs for choirs are still popular, and his collection of harmonized folk songs for the mixed choir Aušrelei beauštant is widely known. Choir competitions of his name are held since 1989 in Marijampolė.

== Biography ==
=== Early life ===
Jonas Bendorius was born on 15 August [O.S. 3 August] 1889 in the village of Skaisčiai. Bendorius graduated from a local primary school in 1899. From graduation up until 1902, Bendorius attended private music lessons. After passing gymnasium exams by himself, Bendorius continued to teach himself to play the organ. He played the instrument as a teenager in the town of Vištytis, later working as a choirmaster there between 1904 and 1907. Wanting to improve his musical abilities, Bendorius enrolled in the Warsaw Institute of Music, where he also headed the choir of the Warsaw Society of Lithuanians. For a brief period in 1910, Bendorius returned to Marijampolė, where a premiere of Birutė occurred. The opera was composed by Bendorius, Albinas Iešmanta, and directed by Mikas Petrauskas. In 1912 Bendorius graduated from Mieczysław Surzyński's organ class, once again returning to Marijampolė to work as an organ player and teacher in the city's Žiburys gymnasium. Additionally, Bendorius lectured at teacher seminars and at his own private music study up until 1920. From 1913 to 1920 Bendorius was the chairman and choirmaster of the Gabija society, established by him, Iešmanta, and Motiejus Gustaitis.

=== Interwar Lithuania ===
In 1924 Bendorius graduated from Stephan Krehl and Paul Graener's composition class at the University of Music and Theatre in Leipzig, writing a scientific study on the development of the overture in history. From 1924 to 1933 Bendorius lectured at a music school in Kaunas. After it was transformed into the Lithuanian National Conservatory, Bendorius became its inspector until 1940. From 1925 to 1927 Bendorius was the chairman of a society dedicated to Lithuanian kanklės players. Additionally, in 1930 Bendorius began lecturing at the Elena Laumenskienė Folk Conservatory, in organ and conducting courses. From 1925 to 1934 Bendorius headed the Daina Society. From 1930, Bendorius served in various posts such as vice-chairman of the board of the Lithuanian Society of Artists, chairman of the Music Commission, and chairman of the Ministry of Education's music textbook publishing commission. For several years, he was a music reviewer for the newspaper Lietuvos aidas. When writing about musical works, he positively assessed the innovative tendencies of composers' creativity and criticized manifestations of dilettantism. In 1937 Bendorius was given the title of senior teacher, and in 1938 was awarded the Order of the Lithuanian Grand Duke Gediminas (5th class). He also established himself as a music critic.

=== Later years and death ===
In 1940 Bendorius and Konradas Kaveckas established the Vilnius Juozas Tallat-Kelpša Conservatory, being its director up until 1945. Later, Bendorius, Kaveckas, and Domas Andriulis established the Vilnius Music School. From 1945 to 1948 Bendorius was the chairman of the organizing committee of the Lithuanian Composers' Union. In 1946 he was elected as a member of the Lithuanian National Philharmonic Society. In 1948 he became a member of the Art Council of the House of Folk Creativity of the Lithuanian SSR. In 1948 he was elected a deputy of the Vilnius City Council of People's Deputies. Between 1945 and 1949, Bendorius once again headed the Vilnius Juozas Tallat-Kelpša Conservatory, becoming a professor in 1948. From 1949 to 1954 he lectured at the Lithuanian State Conservatory. Among Bendorius's notable students were Benjaminas Alekna, Julius Špigelglazas, and Vytautas Venckus.

Bendorius died on 27 June 1954 at his residence in Palanga. He was buried in the Vilnius Rasos Cemetery.
