= Juozas Naujalis =

Lithuanian conductor and composer (1869–1934)

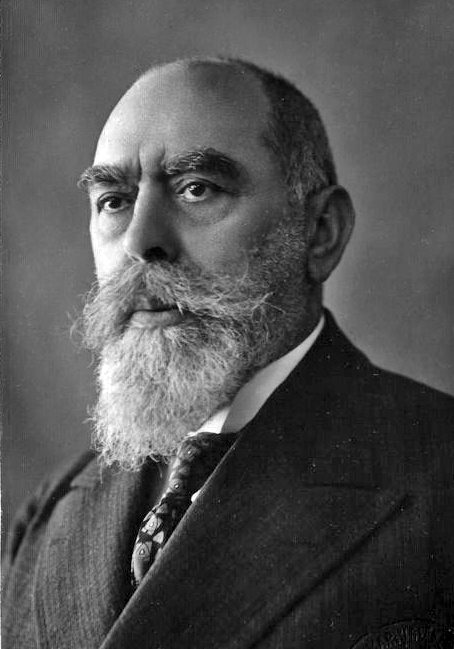
Juozas Naujalis's Portrait

Juozas Naujalis (9 April 1869 in Raudondvaris – 9 September 1934 in Kaunas) was a Lithuanian composer, organist and choir conductor. He is acclaimed as Lithuanian music patriarch.

== Biography ==
Naujalis studied Warsaw Institute of Music and in Regensburg. In 1898, he founded the Lithuanian Society of Singers Daina and was one of the founder of St. Gregor's Society of Lithuanian Organists in Kaunas. He was excellent Master and Rector of his founded School of Organists (1913) and Music School (1919) in Kaunas. Was the conductor of the Cathedral Choir in Kaunas and from 1933 was the professor and Conductor of Organ Music in the Conservatory of Kaunas. Composed masses, motets, organ works and music for choir, symphonic poem The Autumn.

== Works and style ==
Juozas Naujalis' music was mostly connected to the main areas of his work – church music, choral songs, music for organ. He upheld classical traditions, classical harmony, and did not accept innovations in the music language. His choral music holds an important place in his creative legacy, which includes 27 original songs for choir, 17 harmonizations of the folk songs, as well as large portion of church music: 13 masses, 23 motets, hymns, psalms, and other religious pieces – more than 150 compositions in all. His instrumental works include 45 compositions for organ, piano, and orchestra.
