= Petras Babickas =

Lithuanian journalist, poet and writer (1903–1991)

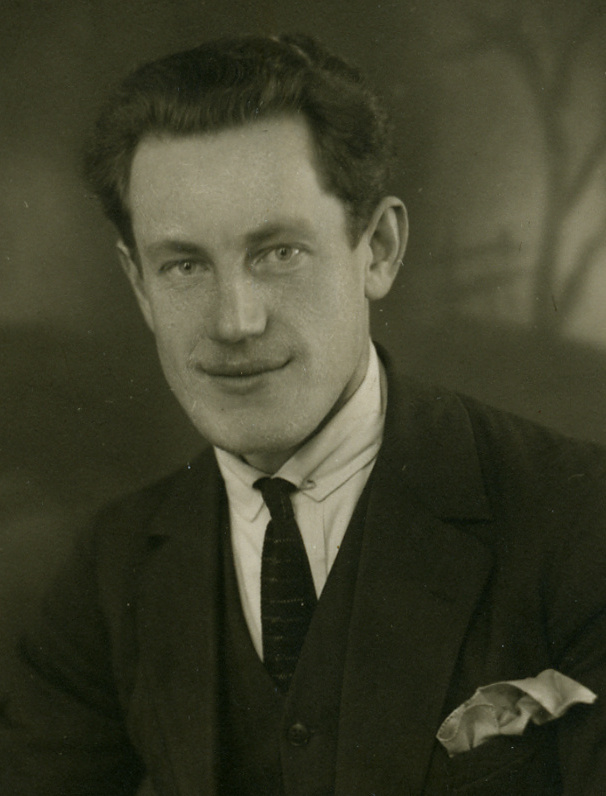
- Born: 12 May [O.S. 29 April] 1903; Laukminiškiai, Kovno Governorate, Russian Empire
- Died: 27 August 1991 (aged 88); Rio de Janeiro, Brazil
- Resting place: Petrašiūnai Cemetery
- Education: University of Lithuania
- Occupations: Journalist, poet, writer, traveler, filmmaker, diplomat, photographer
- Employer: Ministry of Education of Lithuania
- Known for: Director of Kaunas radiophone
- Relatives: Kazys Babickas, Vytautas Babickas, Unė Babickaitė

Petras Babickas (12 May [O.S. 29 April] 1903 – 27 August 1991) was a Lithuanian journalist, poet, writer, traveler, filmmaker, diplomat, and photographer who pioneered radio journalism and artistic photography in interwar Lithuania.

== Early life ==
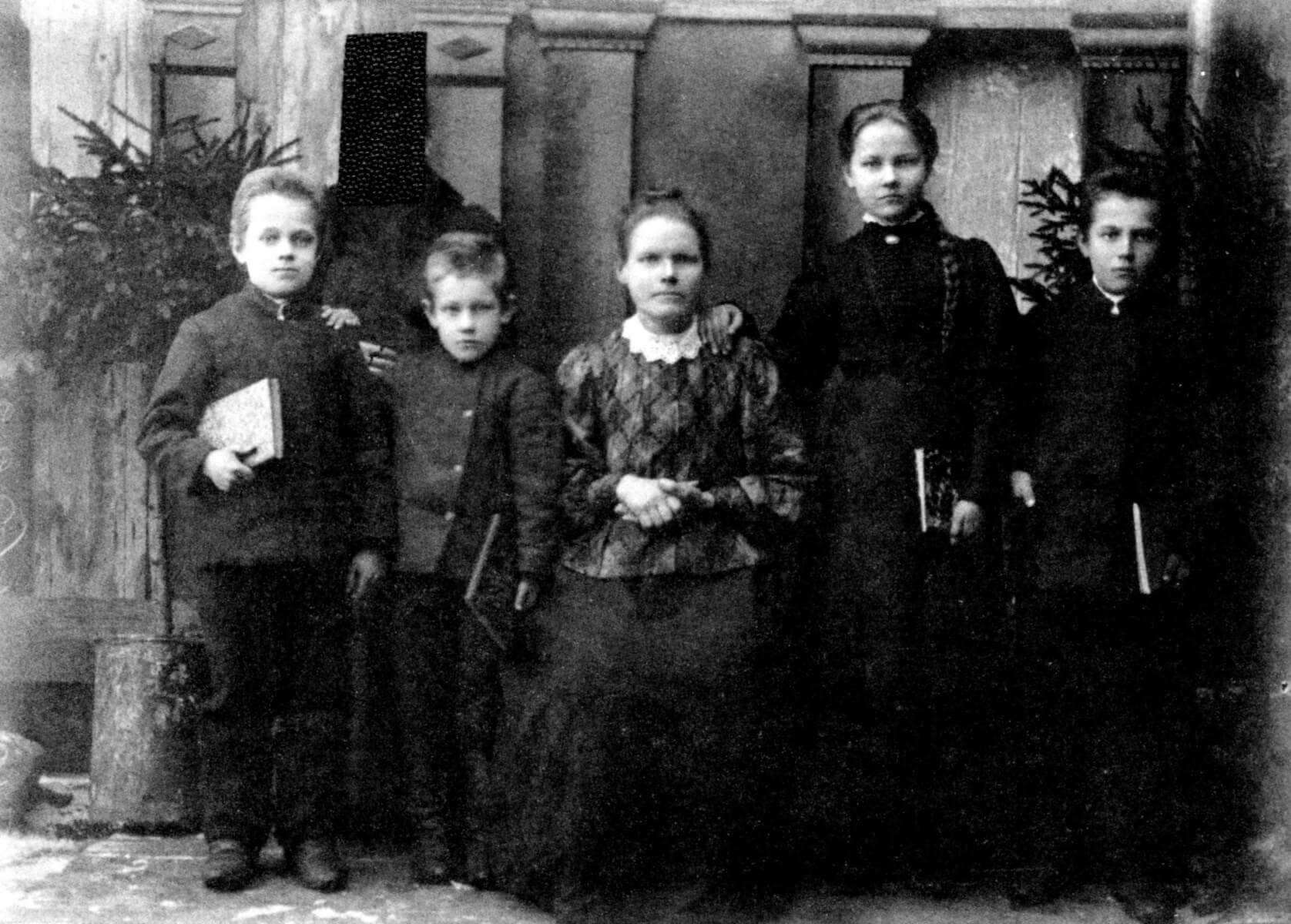
Family of Petras Babickas in 1910. Unė Babickaitė, Kazys Babickas, and Vytautas Babickas can also be seen in the photo.

Petras Babickas was born on 12 May [O.S. 29 April] 1903 in the village of Laukminiškiai (present-day Kupiškis district), then belonging to the Kovno Governorate of the Russian Empire. He was the fourth youngest child of Jurgis Babickis and Agota Babickienė née Graičiūnaitė. The family also would raise Kazys Babickas, a lieutenant colonel of the Lithuanian Army, and Unė Babickaitė, an actress. Babickas attended school in Virbališkiai. In 1915, the family moved to St. Petersburg due to the First World War. Babickas's sister noticed his brother's inclination to art, and encouraged him to draw. The family returned to Lithuania in 1918, and settled in Kaunas, the country's temporary capital, in 1919. Unė Babickaitė rented an apartment in Laisvės Alėja, where the family lived. In 1920 Babickas began attending the Juozas Balčikonis Gymnasium, where he participated in the Meno kuopa literary society. From 1921, Babickas actively began participating in Lithuanian (Karys, Lietuvos aidas, Naujoji Romuva, Skautų aidas, Trimitas, Vairas, Žiburėlis, Židinys) and Lithuanian-American magazines. After graduating in 1923, Babickas began studying Lithuanian literature and history at the University of Lithuania. However, due to a lack of funds to continue his education, Babickas became an art and literature teacher at the Jurbarkas Saulė Gymnasium. Babickas would periodically continue studying until 1930.

== Career ==
=== Radiophone and film career ===
In 1926, Babickas began working at the Kaunas radiophone, becoming its first host and director. The first radio show was broadcast on 23 January 1927. Babickas often hosted shows for children, where he would talk about Lithuanian folklore, legends, as well as excerpts from the works of various writers. After inner conflict within the radiophone in 1931, Babickas quit his job as a host. From 1931 to 1934 he worked at the Moscow Film School; it is possible that his experience there led him to strongly oppose Bolshevism. In 1933 Babickas became the director of Ąžuolynas, a public park in Kaunas. Babickas edited the Foto megėjas (1933–1934) and Mūsų Vilnius (1936–1938) magazines, and contributed to the Pajūris magazine. Babickas organized the film library of the Lithuanian Ministry of Education and prepared propaganda films about Lithuania. As a filmmaker, Babickas made films about Antanas Smetona, Adomas Jakštas, Jonas Šliūpas, Martynas Jankus, Gabrielė Petkevičaitė, Jonas Jurgis Bulota, as well as the ANBO IV airplane.

=== Literary career ===
As a writer, Babickas published books and poems of varying content. Some, like Nuostabi Jonuko kelionė (1930), Marziukas (1933), and Tra-ta-ta (1934) were for children, the latter being one of the first collections of children's poems. For Marziukas, Babickas was awarded the Lithuanian Red Cross Youth Literature Prize. Babickas also published poem collections like Geltona ir juoda (1930), Žmogaus remontas (1934), and later – Toli nuo Tėvynės (1945), the first collection of Lithuanian poems abroad, Eileraščiai (1946), and Svetimoj padangėj (1947). In prose, Babickas wrote Vakar (1931), considered a work of romantic nationalism, for which he was awarded the Lithuanian Riflemen's Union Prize. Furthermore, he wrote Gyvenimas – laimė (1940), and Lietuva Bolševikų okupacijoj (1948) under the pseudonym of Jurgis Mantas. Additionally, Babickas wrote plays, and prepared publications about Lithuania in foreign languages such as Spanish (Lituania, 1947), English (Picturesque Lithuania, 1958), and Portuguese (Lituânia ilustrada, 1951).

Babickas's literary work is considered expressionist and rebellious, by its content considered close to the avant-garde Keturvėjininkai movement.

=== Photography career ===
After becoming interested in artistic photography, Babickas became its pioneer, preparing an exhibition of three hundred works in Kaunas and establishing the Lithuanian Amateur Photography Society in 1933. One of the most famous interwar photographers of Lithuania, Babickas was one of the first to publish photo reports in the Lithuanian press. He exhibited his photographs in the Exposition Internationale des Arts et Techniques dans la Vie Moderne in 1937, for which he was awarded a gold medal. He illustrated travel books with his and other photographers' photos of Neringa, Greece, and Brazil. After Lithuania gained the Vilnius region in 1939, Babickas went there as a correspondent to write about and take pictures of the city, which propelled his fame.

=== Traveler ===
Babickas created watercolor paintings, pencil and ink drawings, as well as illustrated travel books. Babickas, a polyglot of eight languages, also actively traveled; he visited Western Europe, Turkey, North Africa, and North and South America. Interested in local rural history, Babickas traveled around villages and wrote down folklore, collected folk artworks, and established a small museum of folklore history in his home in Garliava.

== Later years ==
=== Emigration ===
After the Soviet occupation of Lithuania, Babickas was prohibited from hosting shows at the Kaunas radiophone. However, during Nazi occupation, Babickas was once again made its director. In 1941 Babickas created an exhibition about the Red Terror at the Vytautas the Great War Museum. As the Soviet front was getting closer, to avoid repressions from the Soviet authorities, in 1944, with the assistance of Tadas Ivanauskas, Babickas moved to Germany, crossing the Nemunas River near Jurbarkas. He lived there until 1945, moving later to Rome. In 1949 Babickas settled down in Rio de Janeiro, where he actively participated in Lithuanian émigré cultural organizations. In Canada, from 1950 to 1965, Babickas was secretary of the Lithuanian Embassy in Brazil, head of the culture department, and press attaché. Babickas hosted a weekly show entitled Lietuvos balsas in Portuguese from 1958 to the 1970s.

Babickas organized literary evenings, exhibitions of Lithuanian folk art, translated poetry, and wrote articles for the Boston-based Lithuanian encyclopedia. Additionally, he wrote for the American-Lithuanian Aidai, Draugas, and Australian-Lithuanian Mūsų pastogė magazines. Babickas's positive expressions about the death of Stalin in 1953 put him on the front pages of a Rio de Janeiro daily newspaper.

=== Death ===
Towards the end of his life, Babickas lived in impoverished conditions. Refusing Brazilian citizenship, he consequently did not receive a pension. For a long time, the writer was supported by émigré aid organizations, relatives, friends, and other Lithuanian emigrants. Babickas died on 27 August 1991 in Rio de Janeiro. He was buried in the city's Catumbi Cemetery, in the Lithuanian Catholic burial section. His remains were transferred to Lithuania on 25 May 2006, and re-buried in the Petrašiūnai Cemetery on 6 June.

== Remembrance ==
In remembrance, his home village contains a dedicated museum, and a short film was made in 2006 about the life of Babickas. He was the namesake of streets in Panemunė (1998) and Naujoji Vilnia (2008). A book about Petras Babickas was released in 2010, and since 2012, the Lithuanian Journalists' Union and the National Association of Journalists' Creators have been annually awarding the P. Babickas Prize to radio and television journalists for "mature pieces of radio and television journalism of various genres".
