= Vytautas Kazimieras Jonynas =

Lithuanian artist

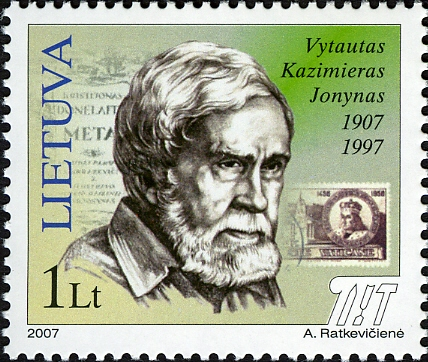

Vytautas Kazimieras Jonynas (10 March 1907 in Ūdrija, near Alytus – 4 December 1997 in Vilnius) was a Lithuanian artist. He worked as a book illustrator, graphic, painter, sculptor, stained glass artist, posters and furniture designer.

== Biography ==
After studying in Kalvarija and graduating from high school in Kaunas, Jonynas started art studies at the Kaunas Art School. Jonynas attended Adomas Varnas (painting) and Adomas Galdikas (graphics) studios. In 1931 he moved to Paris, where he earned a degree in xylography and book illustrating. Later he studied wood sculpture and cabinetmaker crafts in Ècole Boulle. In 1935 he held his first personal exhibition. After completing his studies in France Jonynas returned to Lithuania. His illustration for Kristijonas Donelaitis Metai became classics of the genre. At the time he was teaching at Kaunas Art School. In 1937 he was elected as a member of the International Sculpture Commission. The same year Jonynas was awarded Golden medal in the international exhibition in Paris for his woodcarvings and posters. In 1938 he was awarded a Cross of Order of the French Legion of Honour. From 1936 until 1941 Jonynas worked as preservation specialist in Lithuanian inspection of cultural heritage, later became chief of the organization.

In 1944 Jonynas retreated to Germany, where he lived until 1950. He then moved to the United States. He was active in Lithuanian cultural life in exile. With assistance from Schmittlein, Jonynas founded an art school in Freiburg im Breisgau (École des Arts et Métiers) and supervised it. In Germany Jonynas started illustrating bibliographic books again. One of his last works in xylography was illustrations for Raymond Schmittlein's study on Prosper Mérimée Lokis created in 1949. He also created illustrations for Shakespeare's Hamlet, Johann Wolfgang von Goethe's die Leiden des Jungen Werthers, (published by Karl Alber; the illustrations were bought by the Goethe-Schiller Institute) and Le Siège de Mayence. Le Siège was the first book that Jonynas illustrated using aquarelle and not xylography.

In the United States Jonynas continued to illustrate books, although he changed his technique. During 1955–1979 Jonynas designed interiors for over 60 churches in the United States, Europe, and Australia. He also created a new technique joining stained glass, fresco and bass-relief when he was commissioned to create a mural at Rikers Island, New York. In 1955 he founded and art studio Jonynas and Shepherd Art studio, Inc. in New York. Jonynas also designed Chapel of Lithuanian Martyrs in St. Peter's Basilica and decorated Vatican City pavilion for the 1964 New York World's Fair. Jonynas taught at the Catan-Rose Institute of Fine Arts (1951–1957) and Fordham University (1957–1973).

Jonynas is also known for his designs of postal stamps for interwar Lithuania. He also designed over 50 stamps for the French Occupation zone in Germany (described as among the most artistic German stamps), France, and Vatican (1959). The Vatican stamp commemorated the 500th birthday anniversary of Lithuanian patron Saint Casimir. Jonynas was also asked to create a postal stamp for the United Nations to commemorate Universal Declaration of Human Rights, but the stamp was not printed due political reasons.

== Works ==
Vytautas Kazimieras Jonynas left a large number of graphics, stained glass works, sculptures, book illustrations. Jonynas brought back to Lithuanian most of his works. The largest collection of his works is preserved at his name art gallery-home in Druskininkai. Jonynas donated all of his creative works to Lithuania. He was buried in Antakalnis Cemetery, Vilnius.

== Awards ==
- Cross of Order of the French Legion of Honour, Officers rank (1938)
- Vilnius Academy of Fine Arts awarded him honorary doctor title
- Honorary citizen of Druskininkai
- Commander's Cross of the Order of Grand Duke of Lithuania Gediminas (1993)
- Elected into National Academy of Design (1973)
