= Keturvalakiai =

- Town
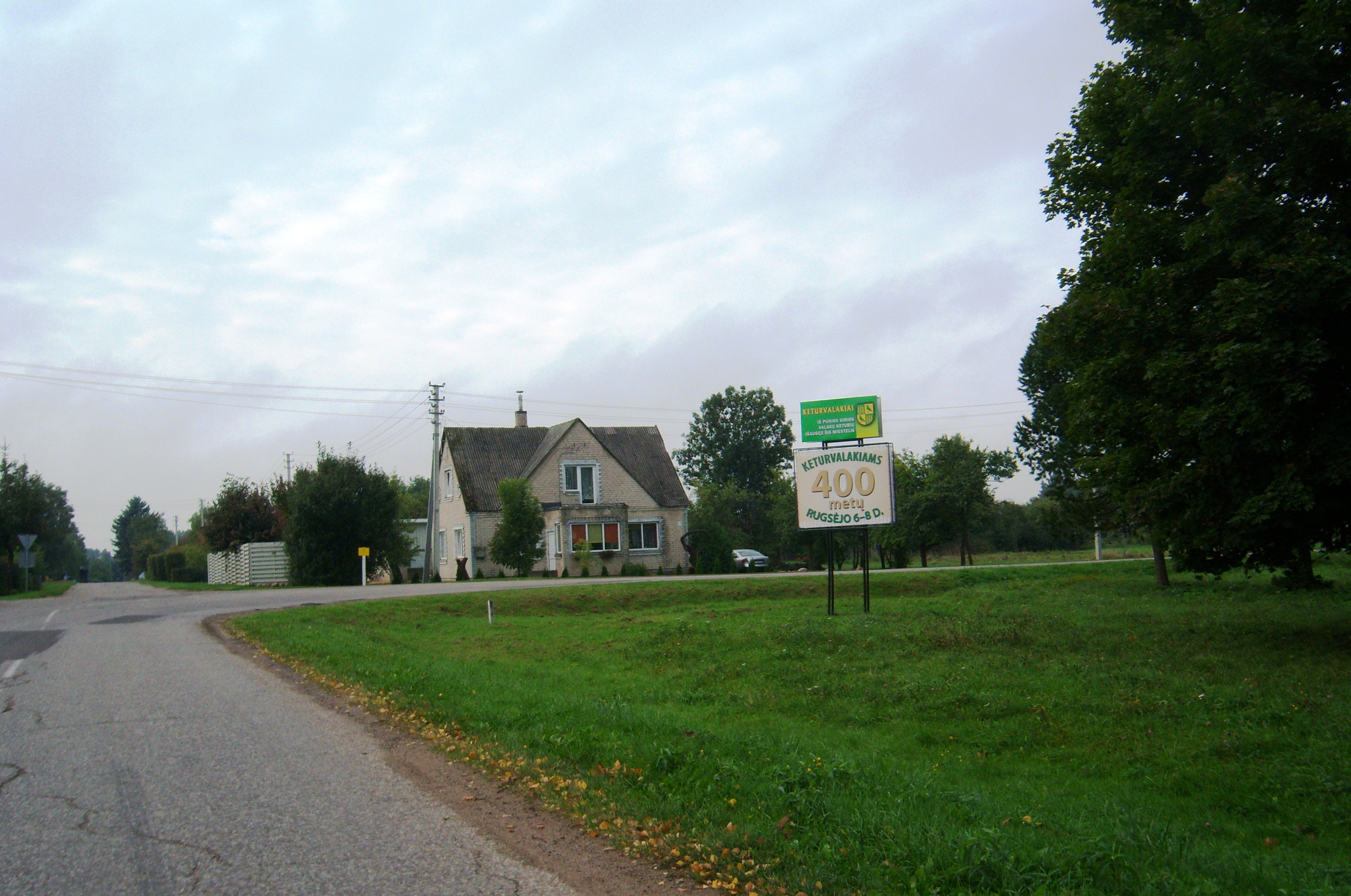
- Stend announcing 400 years jubilee

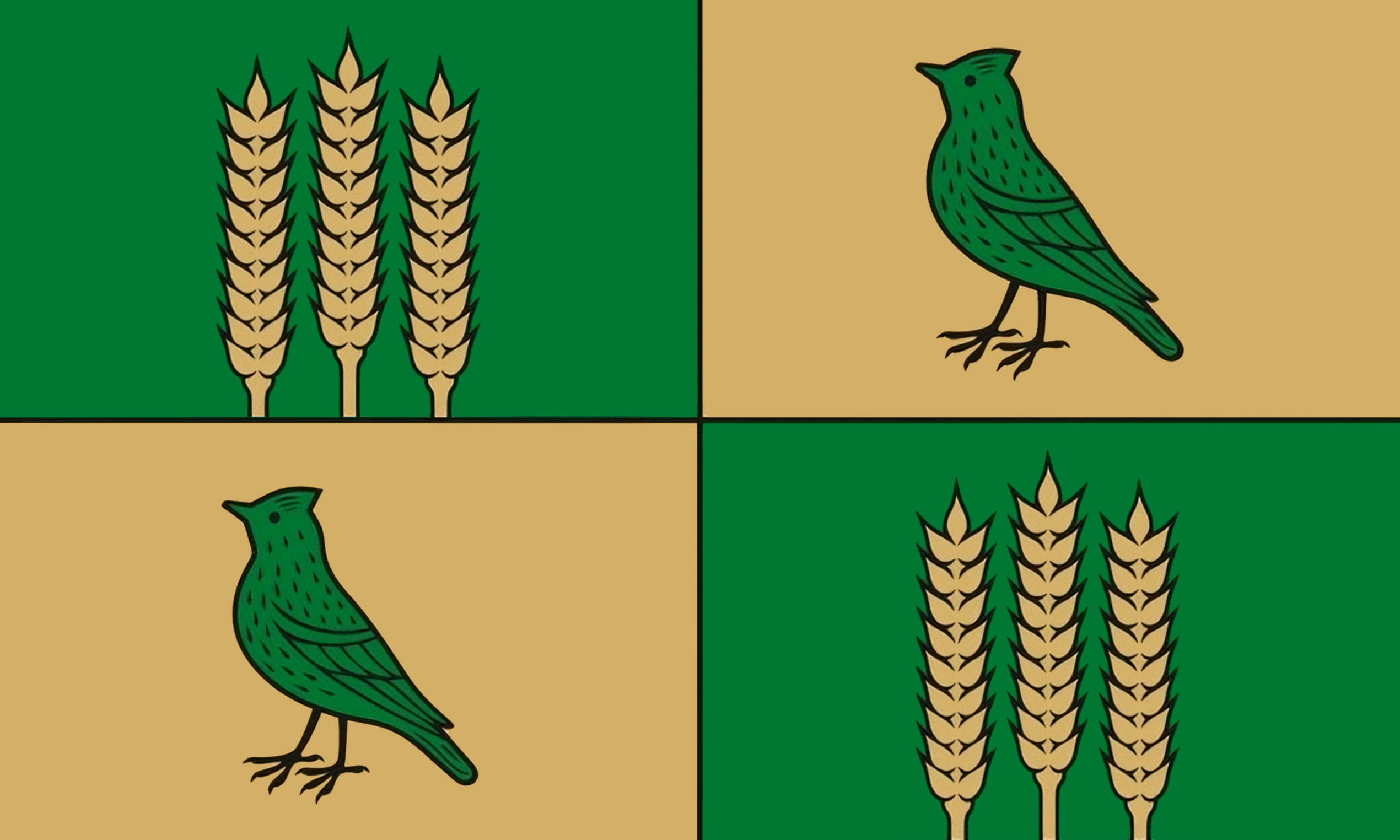
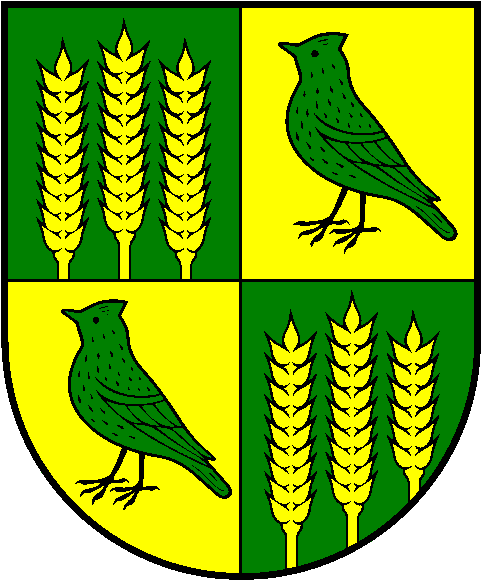
- Flag Seal

- Location within Lithuania
- Coordinates: 54°33′20″N 23°10′10″E
- Country: Lithuania
- County: Marijampolė County

Population (2011)
  - Total: 113
- Time zone: UTC+2 (EET)
  - Summer (DST): UTC+3 (EEST)

Keturvalakiai is a small town in Marijampolė County, in southwestern Lithuania. According to the 2011 census, the town has a population of 113 people.
