= Unė Babickaitė =

Lithuanian actress and theater director

Unė Babickaitė-Graičiūnienė
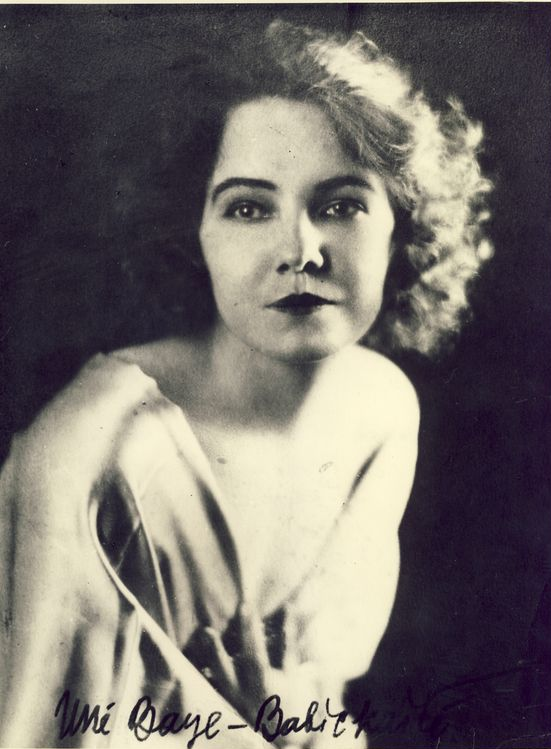
- Unė Babickaitė - Unė Baye
- Born: Uršulė Babickaitė; April 19, 1897; Laukminiškiai, Kovno Governorate, Russian Empire
- Died: 1 August 1961 (aged 64); Kaunas, Lithuanian SSR
- Other name: Une Baye
- Education: Saint Petersburg Conservatory
- Occupations: Actress, theater director
- Spouse: Vytautas Andrius Graičiūnas
- Relatives: Petras Babickas (brother)

Unė Babickaitė-Graičiūnienė (born Uršulė Babickaitė also known as Une Baye; 19 April 1897 – 1 August 1961) was a Lithuanian actress and theater director. During World War I, she attended the Saint Petersburg Conservatory. After the war, she became the first female theater director of Lithuania. She staged several plays, but they were not well received by the male critics. She then moved to the United States and appeared in several silent films. In 1924, she married Vytautas Andrius Graičiūnas. With his financial support, she organized theater plays in Paris and London. Babickaitė returned to Lithuania in 1936. After World War II, she was sentenced to five years in a Gulag.

== Biography ==
During World War I, Babickaitė and her family retreated to Saint Petersburg. There she met writer Balys Sruoga, who encouraged her to begin theater studies at the Saint Petersburg Conservatory in 1916. Balys named her Unė. After returning to Lithuania, she organized theater group Daina and staged several performances. However, a woman director stirred up controversy in a conservative society and the plays were attacked by critics. In 1919, Babickaitė moved to the United States, where she simplified her name to Unė Baye and between 1922 and 1924 appeared in several silent films by Paramount. She left the film industry due to visual impairment and instead performed in the theaters in New York, Washington DC, Chicago.

In 1924, she married Graičiūnas, her cousin, and moved with him to London in 1928. With her husband financing her artistic endeavors, she established the New Russian Theatre, and later the Anglo-American Company Troupe, appeared in theaters in both London and Paris. In France, she met with Konstantin Balmont, who dedicated at least four of his poems to her. Following a serious illness, two car crashes and multiple surgeries, she joined the Third Order of Saint Francis in Italy but did not take vows. In 1936, she returned to Lithuania and directed plays for the Lithuanian Riflemen's Union.

After World War II, following the Soviet occupation of the Baltic states, her husband, an American citizen, was arrested in 1951 and sentenced to ten years in Gulag. He died the following year under unclear circumstances. Babickaitė was also sentenced to five years. In 1953, during the de-Stalinization campaign after Joseph Stalin's death, she received amnesty and was allowed to return to Lithuania. She died in 1961 in Kaunas.

== Legacy ==
Babickaitė left an extensive collection of documents, correspondence, and photos, which are preserved by the Martynas Mažvydas National Library of Lithuania. Two volumes of documents were published in 2001 and 2005. Various theater exhibits, collected by her, are displayed by the Lithuanian Theatre, Music and Film Museum, established by Balys Sruoga and Vincas Krėvė-Mickevičius in 1926. The family home in Laukminiškės village, where Babickaitė and her brother writer Petras Babickas were born, was turned into an ethnographic and memorial museum in 2002.
