= Jadvyga Jovaišaitė =

Lithuanian ballet dancer (1903–2000)

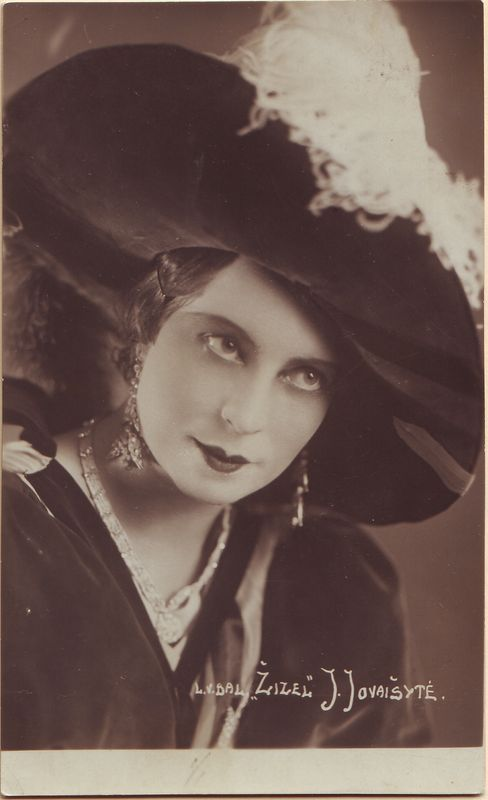
- Born: 8 February 1903; Tbilisi, Russian Empire
- Died: 22 October 2000 (aged 97); Vilnius, Lithuania
- Occupation: Ballet dancer
- Employer(s): Kaunas Conservatory; National M. K. Čiurlionis School of Art
- Spouse: Petras Oleka

Jadvyga Jovaišaitė-Olekienė (8 February 1903 – 22 October 2000) was a Lithuanian ballet dancer and teacher.

== Biography ==
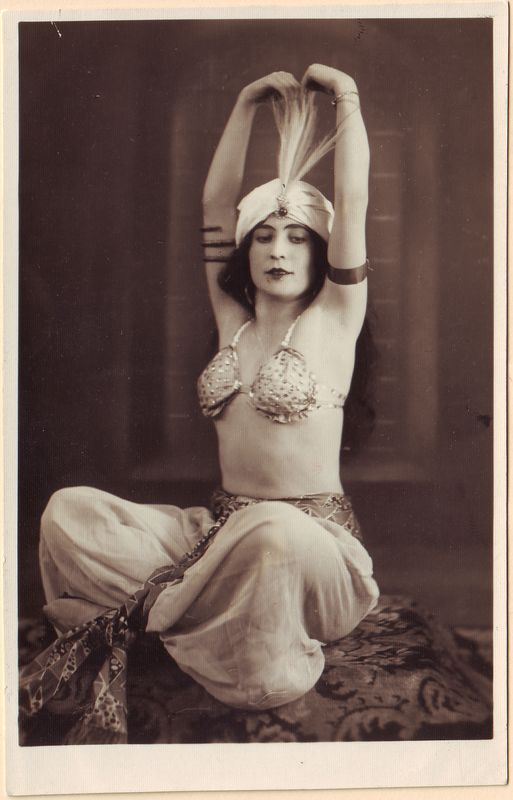
Jovaišaitė in costume

Jovaišaitė was born on 8 February 1903 in Tbilisi, Russian Empire. In Tbilsi, she trained at Maria Perini's private ballet studio in the Tbilisi State Academy of Arts.

After her family moved to Lithuania, Jovaišaitė studied dance under Olga Dubeneckienė, reviving classical ballets. She began her professional career dancing in opera productions, performing classical ballet alongside folk dances such as the Italian tarantella and Hungarian csárdás.

In 1925, Jovaišaitė was a founding member of the first Lithuanian ballet company at the Lithuanian National Opera and Ballet Theatre. That year she danced in the first ballet at the theatre, Coppelia, composed by Léo Delibes and directed by ballet master Pavel Petrovas.

Jovaišaitė taught dance at the Kaunas Conservatory from 1929 to 1935. She later taught ballet at the National M. K. Čiurlionis School of Art. Her students included Regina Jamontaitė [lt].

In 1935, Jovaišaitė toured with the Lithuanian ballet troupe to Monte Carlo and London.

Jovaišaitė was awarded the Commander's Cross of the Order of the Lithuanian Grand Duke Gediminas in 1995. She was an Honored Artist of the Lithuanian Soviet Socialist Republic.

Jovaišaitė was married to opera singer Petras Oleka [lt]. She died on 22 October 2000 in Vilnius, Lithuania, aged 97.
