= Adomas Galdikas =

Lithuanian painter, graphic artist, and scenographer

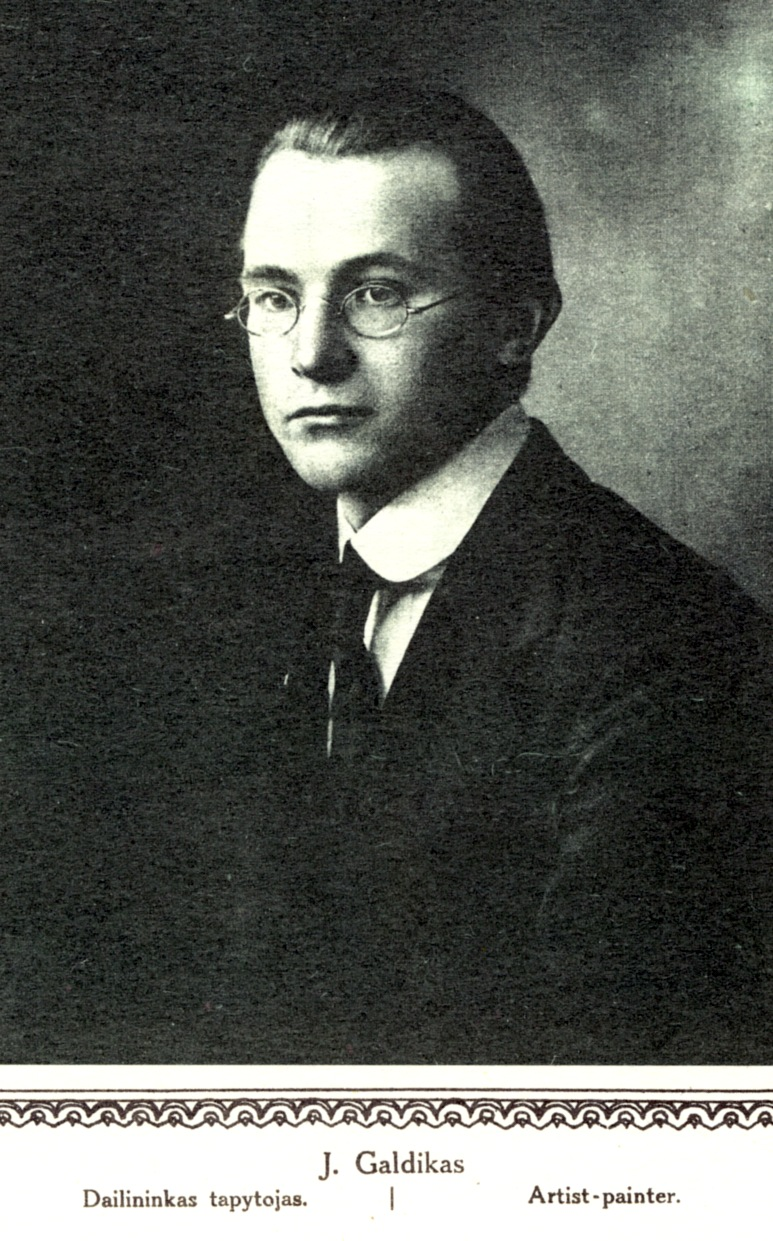

Adomas Galdikas (October 18, 1893, in Giršinai, near Mosėdis – December 7, 1969, in New York City) was a Lithuanian painter, graphic artist, and scenographer.

== Biography ==
Galdikas graduated from Baron Stieglitz's painting studio in Saint Petersburg in 1917. Galdikas continued his studies in Berlin, Sweden, Italy, and France. In 1923, after returning to Lithuania, he founded his own graphics studio in Kaunas, where he worked until 1940. At the same time he was also lecturing at the Kaunas Art School. During World War II Galdikas was a professor at the Kaunas Applied Arts Institute. Vytautas Kazimieras Jonynas was among his students. From 1946 to 1947 Galdikas lectured as a professor in Freiburg im Breisgau (École des Arts et Métiers). In 1947 Galdikas moved to Paris, and in 1952 to the United States. He settled in New York, where he lived until his death.

== Works ==
From 1920 onward, Galdikas participated in art exhibitions in Lithuania and abroad. Galdikas also illustrated books and created scenography for 19 plays at the Kaunas State Theater. He has also designed a number of interbellum Lithuanian postage stamps, bonds and paper litas banknotes. In Germany, France and the United States he worked mainly as painter.

In 1937 for his triptych Lithuania Galdikas was awarded the 1937 Paris Exhibition Grand Prix. For the scenography and costumes for drama Šarūnas by Vincas Krėvė-Mickevičius Galdikas was awarded 1937 Paris Exhibition Golden medal. Works by Adomas Galdikas were acquired by Stieglitz Museum of Applied Arts, Lithuanian M. K. Čiurlionis National Art Museum, Lithuanian Art Museum, Latvian National Museum of Art, Galerie nationale du Jeu de Paume in Paris, and other museums.
