= Vladas Putvinskis =

Lithuanian paramilitary leader

Vladas Putvinskis-Pūtvis
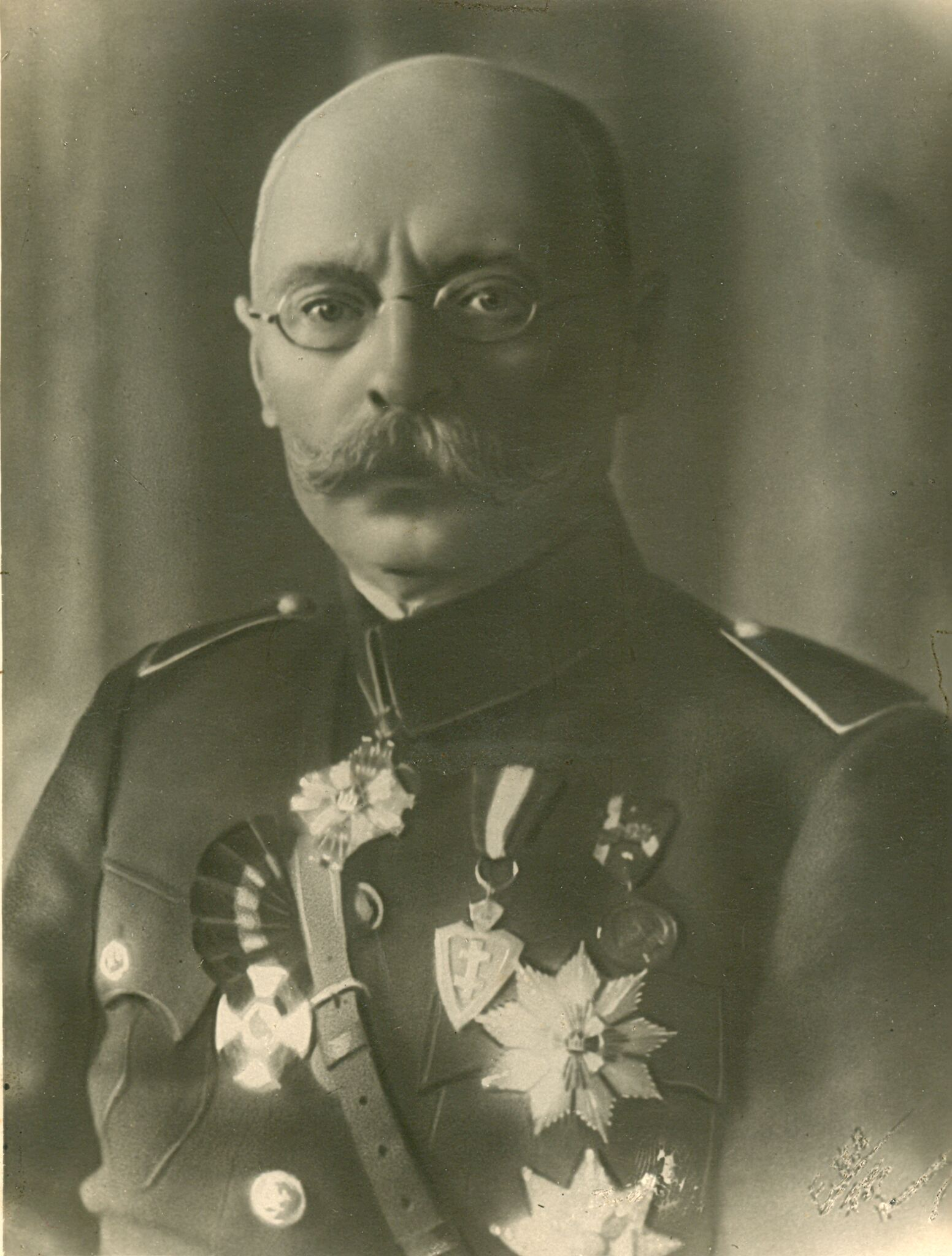
- 1929 postcard with the portrait of Vladas Putvinskis
- Born: 6 October 1873; Riga, Russian Empire
- Died: 5 March 1929 (aged 55); Kaunas, Lithuania
- Other name: Vladas Pūtvis
- Education: University of Halle
- Occupations: Landowner, activist, paramilitary leader
- Known for: Founder of the Lithuanian Riflemen's Union
- Spouse: Emilija Putvinskienė
- Children: Stasys Putvinskis; Emilija Pūtvytė
- Father: Rapolas Putvinskis
- Relatives: Marija Žmuidzinavičienė (sister); Antanas Žmuidzinavičius (brother-in-law)
- Awards: Order of the Lithuanian Grand Duke Gediminas (1928)

Vladas Putvinskis or Vladas Pūtvis (Note: Reportedly, "Pūtvis" is the original Lithuanian surname of the family derived from the Pūtvė village that was a hillfort during the 14th-century Lithuanian Crusade. It was changed to "Putvinskis" due to Polonization. Putvinskis' children officially changed their surname to Pūtvis in 1938. Since 1930s, his last name is variously rendered as Putvinskis, Pūtvis, or double surname Putvinskis-Pūtvis.) (6 October 1873 – 5 March 1929) was a Lithuanian paramilitary leader, one of the founders and first chairman of the Lithuanian Riflemen's Union.

Born to a family of Lithuanian nobles, Putvinskis inherited manors in Pavėžupis and Graužikai that had about 350 hectares (860 acres) of land. He briefly studied agriculture at the University of Halle but had to return to Lithuania to work at his estates. He fully supported the Lithuanian National Revival. His home became a gathering place for Lithuanian intellectuals who published the Lithuanian newspaper Varpas and established the Lithuanian Democratic Party in 1902. Putvinskis also organized large scale smuggling and distribution of the illegal Lithuanian publications. After the press ban was lifted, he smuggled weapons and provided shelter for various political activists hiding from the Tsarist police. Putvinskis was arrested in 1906 and spent a few months in prison. In 1914–1917, he lived in internal exile in Voskresenskoye in the Nizhny Novgorod Oblast.

Upon his return to Lithuania, he joined a group of Lithuanian intellectuals who organized shooting practices in Kaunas. This group evolved to become the Lithuanian Riflemen's Union in August 1919 and Putvinskis became its chairman and commander-in-chief. Initially, it was a paramilitary group that provided support to the Lithuanian Army during the Lithuanian Wars of Independence. Putvinskis managed to reorganize the union into much broader national movement that would foster the Lithuanian national identity. However, he resigned in June 1922 after conflicts with the Lithuanian Army and criticisms of nepotism. He returned as chairman of the Riflemen's Union in June 1928, but he died in March 1929.

== Biography ==
=== Early life and education ===
Putvinskis was born on 6 October [O.S. 24 September] 1873 in Riga, then part of the Russian Empire, to a family of Polish-Lithuanian gentry. The family traced its roots to the times of Grand Duke Vytautas (died in 1430). Putvinskis' father Rapolas Putvinskis (Polish: Rafał Putwiński) inherited manors in Pavėžupis and Graužikai. After the failed January Uprising, Rapolas Putvinskis was deported to Siberia, for "providing food to the insurgents", he was sentenced to exile in Omsk, where he arrived in June 1864. In 1869, he was transferred to Ust-Kamenogorsk. He received amnesty in 1872, but was not allowed to return to Lithuania. Thus, he moved to Riga where he married Idalia Broel-Plater from the Plater family. Their son Vladas was born a year later on 6 October 1873. Their daughter Marija (1876–1959) was also active in Lithuanian public life and the Riflemen's Union. She later married the painter and riflemen chairman Antanas Žmuidzinavičius.

After receiving education at home, Putvinskis enrolled at the Šiauliai Gymnasium. He struggled academically and from melancholia. Therefore, he transferred to Mitau Realymnasium which emphasized natural sciences and where he did better. He graduated in 1893. He considered studying acting in Kraków, but chose more practical studies of agriculture at the University of Halle in Germany. However, due to his father's poor health, he was forced to abandon the studies after only two semesters. He returned to Lithuania, settled in Pavėžupis, and took over his family's estates. The estates had 350 hectares (860 acres) of land, owned 40 cows and 36 horses, and employed 27 people.

=== Activist ===
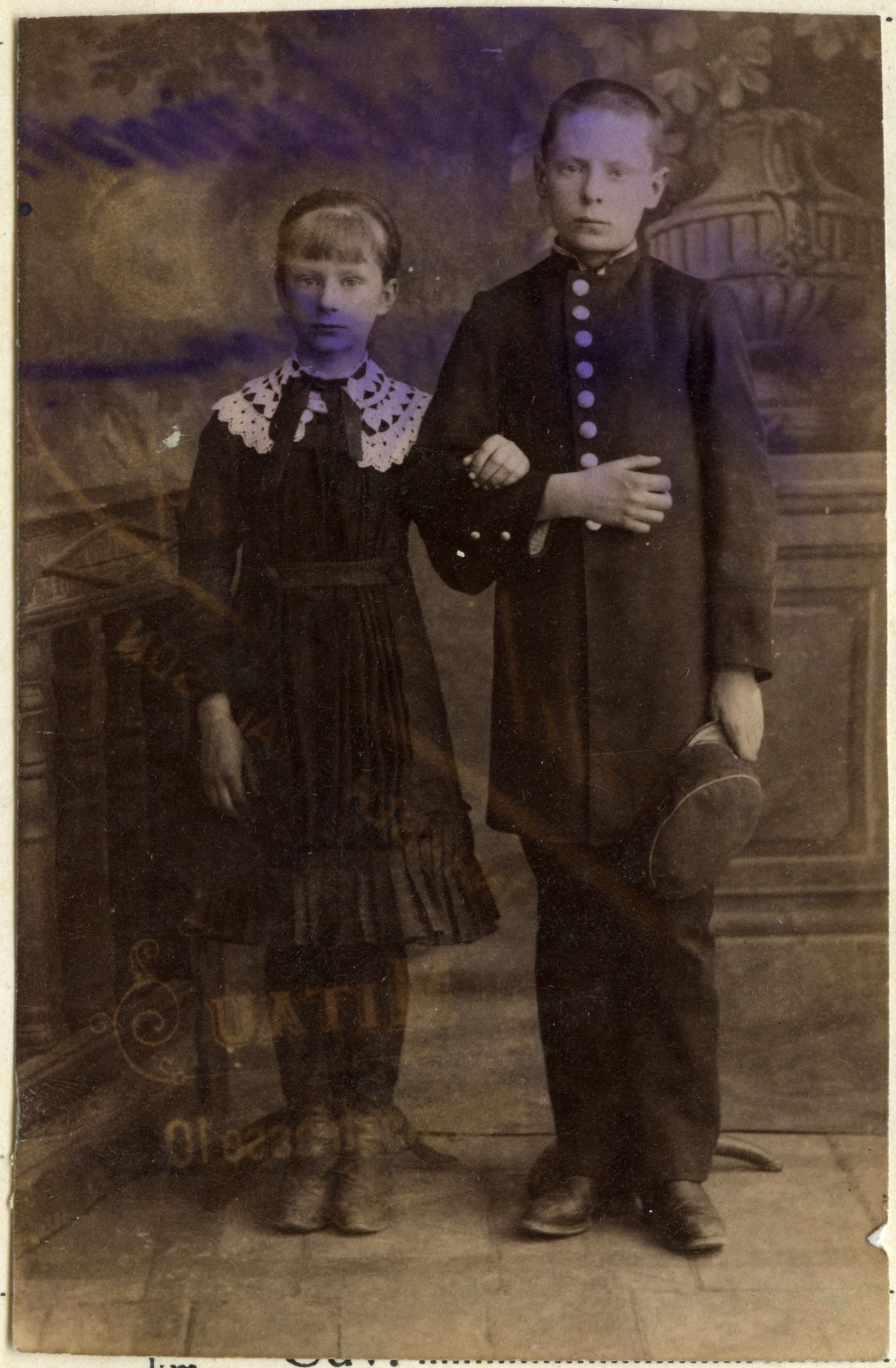
Putvinskis with his sister Marija

Unlike most landowners, Putvinskis fully supported the Lithuanian National Revival. In 1899, he established a primary school for local children in Pavėžupis. Due to the Lithuanian press ban, it was an illegal institution. He planned to expand the school into an official institution that would teach agriculture and craft, but they never came to fruition. It continued to function until 1913 when a government school was opened in nearby Vėžežeris. Putvinskis also opened a school in Graužikai and organized courses for adults. In total, Putvinskis sponsored four illegal Lithuanian schools. Putvinskis also organized the smuggling and distribution of the illegal Lithuanian publications. Books and periodicals were smuggled in large batches from East Prussia and divided into small parcels by Putvinskis for local distribution. Over time, it became a large operation that received regular monthly shipments.

Via his former classmate Vincas Kalnietis, Putvinskis established contacts with Lithuanian intellectuals, firstly Povilas Višinskis and Augustinas Janulaitis. In 1900, Putvinskis employed writer Žemaitė as a steward of his estate. She wrote several short stories during this period. Linguist Jonas Jablonskis spent the summer of 1900 in Graužikai. Assisted by Antanas Smetona and Petras Avižonis, he worked on his fundamental Lithuanian grammar and on editing the works of Bishop Motiejus Valančius. In summer 1902, Povilas Višinskis organized the first meeting of Lithuanian authors at Putvinkis' manor. Such gatherings became a regular occurrence. They were attended by Višinskis, Žemaitė, Gabrielė Petkevičaitė-Bitė, Jonas Krikščiūnas (Jovaras), Jonas Biliūnas, Antanas Žmuidzinavičius, and others. Other visitors included Vincas Mickevičius-Kapsukas, Balys Sruoga, Martynas Jankus, Steponas Kairys, Lev Karsavin. During the meetings, the activists coordinated the publication of Varpas, a Lithuanian periodical published in East Prussia. The activists also discussed political questions and planned for the establishment of the Lithuanian Democratic Party.

=== Arrest and exile ===
Putvinskis supported the Russian Revolution of 1905. He started smuggling weapons and providing shelter for various political activists hiding from the Tsarist police. He was arrested in January 1906 and spent a few months in prisons in Šiauliai and Kaunas. His cellmates included the future general Vladas Nagevičius. Lacking evidence, he was released in May 1906. After the death of Povilas Višinskis in 1906, Putvinskis became less involved in political matters. He focused on his farm and supported various Lithuanian societies, including the Lithuanian Art Society (chaired by his brother-in-law Antanas Žmuidzinavičius). Putvinskis spent considerable effort on educating his children.

In July 1914, just days after the outbreak of World War I, Putvinskis was arrested as "politically unreliable" on orders of Nikolai Gryazev, governor of Kaunas. He was deported to Voskresenskoye in the Nizhny Novgorod Oblast. He spent his time reading and writing increasingly philosophical works. He read works by Henrik Ibsen, Immanuel Kant, Friedrich Nietzsche, Arthur Schopenhauer, Karl Marx, Multatuli, Karl Kautsky, and others.

Putvinskis lived in Voskresenskoye until the Russian Revolution in 1917. He moved near Novocherkassk where his acquaintance owned a farm. He got caught in the Russian Civil War as Novocherkassk changed hands frequently between the anti-communist Don Army and the Red Army. In response, city residents organized their own self-defense committees that patrolled assigned streets. Putvinskis was impressed by their effectiveness. In spring 1918, Putvinskis was able to return to Lithuania.

Putvinskis returned to his estates and organized armed groups of locals to protect against various war refugees, prisoners of war, demoralized soldiers, and other criminals who robbed locals of food. During the Lithuanian–Soviet War, his estates were in the Bolshevik zone for about a month.

=== Riflemen's Union ===
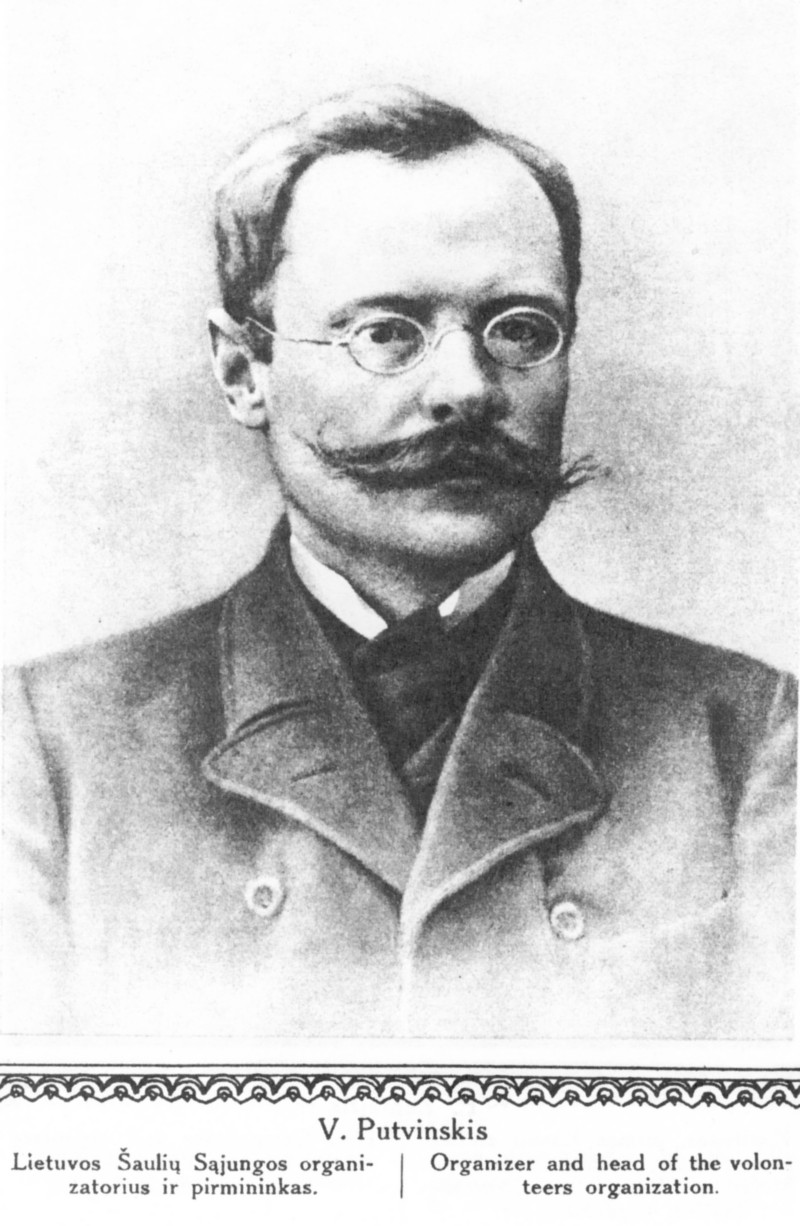
Putvinskis' portrait published in Lithuania Album (1921)

In June 1919, Putvinskis moved to Kaunas to care for his ill son Stasys who had volunteered for the Lithuanian Army. Putvinskis got a job at the Ministry of Supply and Provision (minister Steponas Kairys was an old acquaintance). As Lithuanian Wars of Independence continued, Kaunas residents felt the need for a paramilitary group. On 1 July 1919, Lietuva published the first announcement that the Lithuanian Sports Union (Lietuvos sporto sąjunga) established a new section for riflemen who practiced shooting and handling guns. It was organized by Matas Šalčius and others. Putvinskis joined the group and steered it from a narrow goal (protect against an immediate military threat) to a much broader goal of raising citizen-soldiers who would ensure long-term survival of the Lithuanian nation. Putvinskis cited his experience with self-defense units in Novocherkassk as well as examples of Sokol in Czechoslovakia and Civil Guard in Finland as an inspiration.

The organizational meeting of the Lithuanian Riflemen's Union took place on 8 August 1919. Putvinskis was elected chairman of the union during the next meeting on 20 August. His apartment became the gathering place for all riflemen; his entire family became actively involved with the organization. The riflemen assisted the Lithuanian government in suppressing the attempted Polish coup in September 1919, fighting the West Russian Volunteer Army, and working on military intelligence during the Polish–Lithuanian War. The union grew rapidly, absorbing various local partisan groups By the end of 1919, it boasted 16 regional branches and 39 units.

In spring 1920, Putvinskis left his job at the ministry to work at the Riflemen's Union full-time. He worked on organizing the publication of the riflemen's magazine Trimitas (first issue published in May 1920) where he published numerous articles on current events and issues concerning the riflemen. As military situation stabilized, Putvinskis worked to formulate the ideology of the Riflemen's Union and strengthen its internal structure. Putvinskis was greatly inspired by a Herderian view of the nation as an organic and spiritual body. He saw the state as something that could be lost and recreated, but only as long as the national spirit lived. He envisioned the riflemen as the spiritual elite of the Lithuanian nation.

Putvinskis resigned chairman of the Riflemen's Union on 29 July 1922 and as commander-in-chief on 2 October 1922. He became disheartened by politics and attempts to turn the union into a political organization. He wanted to keep the riflemen as a purely apolitical organization that served the nation and not any particular political party. There was also competition with the Lithuanian Army that culminated in a scuffle between the riflemen and soldiers during the celebration of the Saint Jonas's Festival that left five soldiers injured. In addition, Putvinskis was personally criticized for nepotism and accused of corruption.

=== Later life ===
Putvinskis worked on his estates, implementing modern agricultural technologies. He cultivated lubins, improved drainage, bred Žemaitukas horses, established a steam-powered dairy and exported butter to Denmark. In 1899, he dug out a pond where he experimented with commercial breading of carps. He wrote an instructional booklet on carp breading, but it remained unpublished. It was the first Lithuanian text on fisheries making Putvinskis a pioneer in this field. Putvinskis was invited to teach at the Dotnuva Agricultural College (today Vytautas Magnus University Agriculture Academy) in 1926. His fisheries were successful and were continued after his death. In 1936, the manor had 12 ponds that covered an area of 80 hectares (200 acres). In 2018, there were 70 ponds that cover 800 hectares (2,000 acres).

Putvinskis remained involved within the Riflemen's Union. He organized a local group of riflemen in his estates. He was selected to lead the riflemen in the Klaipėda Revolt in January 1923, but was unable to do so due to an illness. Putvinskis was recognized as honorary chairman of the riflemen in June 1926, but he did not become more active within the organization. He once again became chairman in June 1928. At the time, the Minister of Defense was Teodoras Daukantas who was his supporter. However, during a riflemen event in November 1928, Putvinkis caught flu which caused kidney complication. He died on 5 March 1929 in Kaunas. He was buried in the cemetery in Kelmė. His funeral was a state affair. It was filmed; the footage was hidden from the Soviets by Andriejus Dručkus. It was restored, digitized, and made available on YouTube in 2010.

== Fiction writer ==
Influenced by Povilas Višinskis, Putvinkis tried his hand at writing. His first short stories and articles were published in Varpas (1902–1904) and Darbininkų balsas (1902). Other stores were published in Vilniaus žinios (1914), Nauju taku (1914), Trimitas (1920s). He wrote in Lithuanian (except for one Polish story published in Slovo) even though by his own admission he was more comfortable expressing himself in Polish. In interwar Lithuania, he took Lithuanian language lessons from Julija Jablonskytė-Petkevičienė (daughter of linguist Jonas Jablonskis).

After his release from prison in 1906, he wrote Kudlių šeima (Kudliai Family), a short story that was published in a supplement of Lietuvos aidas in 1918. The story, written as a mythical legend, depicts a young noble shunned by his traditional family chasing a bright and elusive goddess (idea of the Lithuanian nation).

Another lengthier story Giedrė (completed in 1907) is also written as a legend from the Lithuanian mythology. It depicts a primitive but ideal society attacked by enemies clad in iron. The fight ends with a mass suicide in fire (references to the Lithuanian Crusade and Pilėnai). The work was published as a separate booklet in 1915 and 1927; it was republished in 2013. The work created and popularized the name Giedrė.

In 1907, Putvinkis also wrote a short play for children Nežudyk (Do Not Kill). It teaches children to respect animals and the nature. It was reworked into operetta Girių karalius (King of Forests) by Mikas Petrauskas in 1919. The play was published as a separate booklet in 1914 and 1928.

During his exile years (1914–1917), he wrote several increasingly more philosophical works about the relentless struggle of enlightenment and progress against the darkness and destruction. In summer 1915, when the German Army occupied his estates and split his family, he wrote several optimistic works that joy and positive outlook should trump suffering and hopeless despair.

== Awards ==
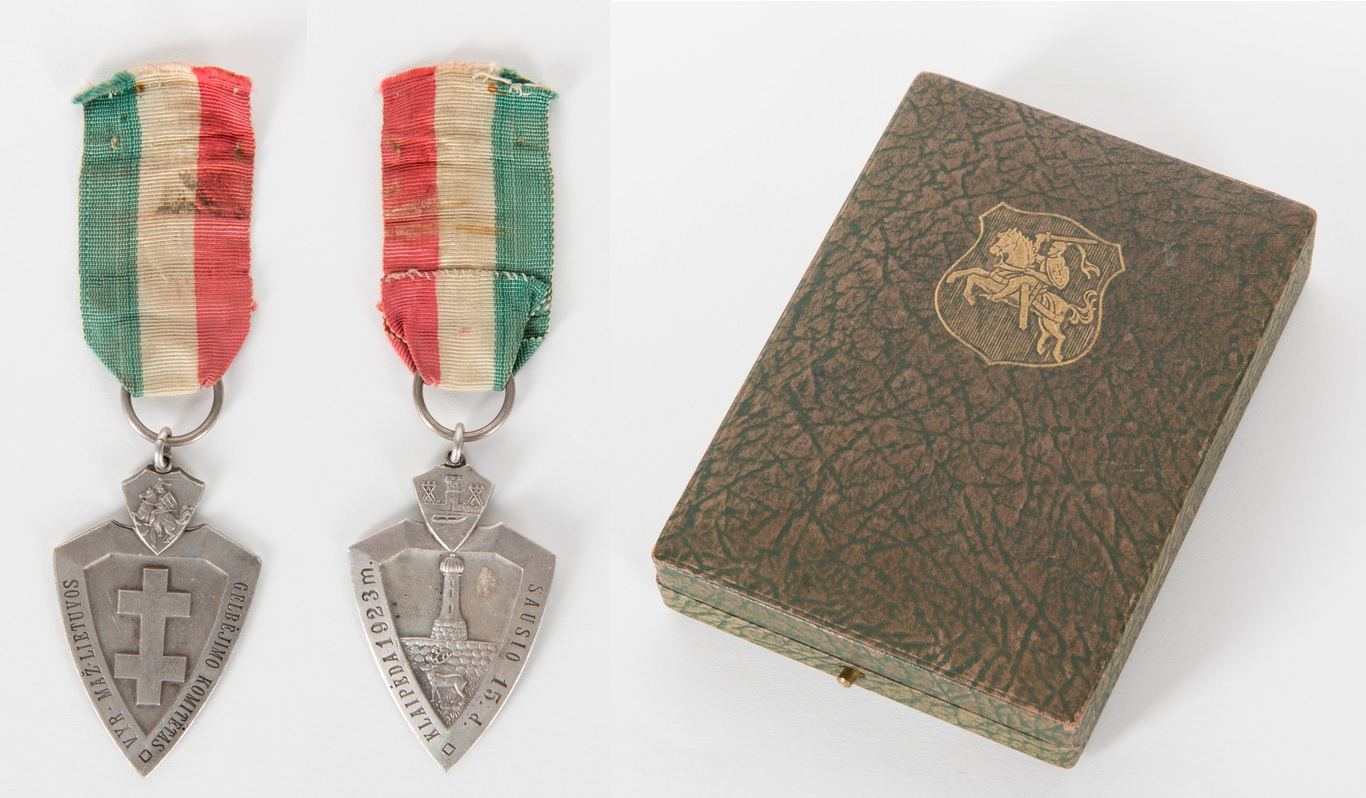
Medal for the Liberation of Klaipėda awarded to Putvinskis

Putvinskis received the following awards:

- Order of the Lithuanian Grand Duke Gediminas (2nd degree, 1928)
- Silver Medal for the Liberation of Klaipėda
- Riflemen's Star
- Latvian Independence Medal
- Order of the Crown of Italy (Grand Officer)

== Legacy and memory ==
=== Monuments and commemorations ===
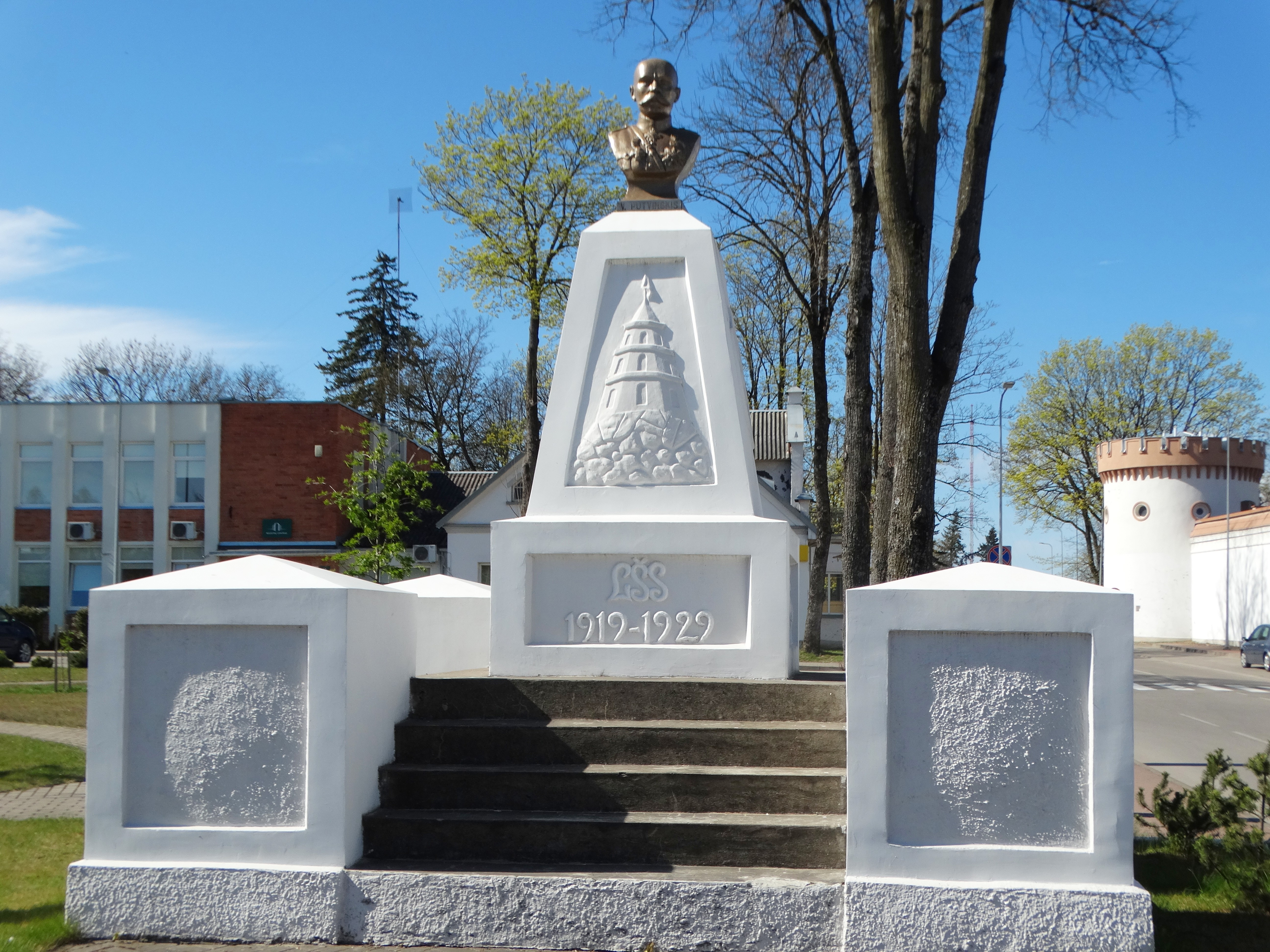
Monument to Putvinskis in Tauragė

Monument to Putvinskis was erected in Tauragė in 1930 (it was rebuilt in 1990). Sculptor Bernardas Bučas created a bust of Putvinskis in 1933–1934. This bust was placed in the garden of the Vytautas the Great War Museum in 1938. It was destroyed by the Soviets, but recreated in 1990. In the same garden, a monument with names of 100 most prominent Lithuanian book smugglers (including Putvinskis) was unveiled in 1940. This monument was destroyed in 1990 and rebuilt in 1997. A medal dedicated to Putvinskis was sculpted by Petras Rimša in 1939. Another monument to Putvinskis was unveiled in 2019 in Kelmė.

A memorial museum to Putvinskis was opened in 1936 inside the riflemen's headquarters in Kelmė. In 2013, Kelmė Regional Museum renewed a permanent exhibition dedicated to Putvinskis.

In 1931, a street in Kaunas was names in his memory. It was renamed after the poet Salomėja Nėris during the Soviet period, but Putvinskis name was reinstated in 1990. Another street in Kelmė bears his name. In 2007, the middle school in Šaukėnai was renamed in Putvinskis honor.

The Seimas (Lithuanian parliament) declared 2023 to be the year of Putvinskis (it's his 150th birth anniversary). As a result, many different events, exhibitions, and conferences were organized in his memory. For the occasion, Edita Mildažytė and Saulius Pilinkus created a documentary film Civilių kariuomenės vadas (Commander of the Civilian Army) about Putvinskis.

=== Archive and publications ===
To safeguard it from the Soviets, Putvinskis' and his family's archive was buried in Graužikai in 1940 and 1944. The archive was recovered in 1989 and 1992, and transferred to the Šiauliai Aušra Museum. The archive contains about 3,000 documents, including 364 items written by Putvinskis and 900 letters. The archive was added to the Lithuanian national registry under the UNESCO Memory of the World Programme in 2008. Putvinskis' letters (total, 359 letters) were published in 2003.

Putvinskis collected writings were published in 1933 (two volumes) in Kaunas and in 1973 in Chicago.

== Personal life ==
On 12 August 1897, Putvinskis married Emilija Gruzdytė. They had six children, five of which reached adulthood. They were all active members of the Riflemen's Union. Both sons died in the Soviet gulag while three daughters emigrated to the United States. The children were:

- Stasys Putvinskis (1898–1942), the Minister of Agriculture (1935–1938)
- Ona Tercijonienė (1899–1972), an educator, contributor to Lithuanian magazines
- Sofija Mantautienė-Marcinkevičienė (1900–1984) worked at ELTA news agency
- Vytautas Putvinskis-Pūtvis (1902–1942)
- Julija Putvinskaitė (1904–1905)
- Emilija Putvinskaitė-Pūtvytė (1908–1995), a teacher

== Bibliography ==
- Balkelis, Tomas (2012). "Turning Citizens into Soldiers: Baltic Paramilitary Movements after the Great War". In Gerwarth, Robert; Horne, John (eds.). War in Peace: Paramilitary Violence in Europe after the Great War. Oxford University Press. ISBN 978-0-19-965491-8.
- Marcinkevičius-Mantautas, Aleksandras (1940). Vladas Putvinskis-Putvys: Jo gyvenimas ir parinktieji raštai (in Lithuanian). Vol. I. Gyvenimas ir kūrybos bruožai. Kaunas: Šaulių sąjungos leidinys.
