= Stasys Putvinskis =

Lithuanian politician (1898–1942)

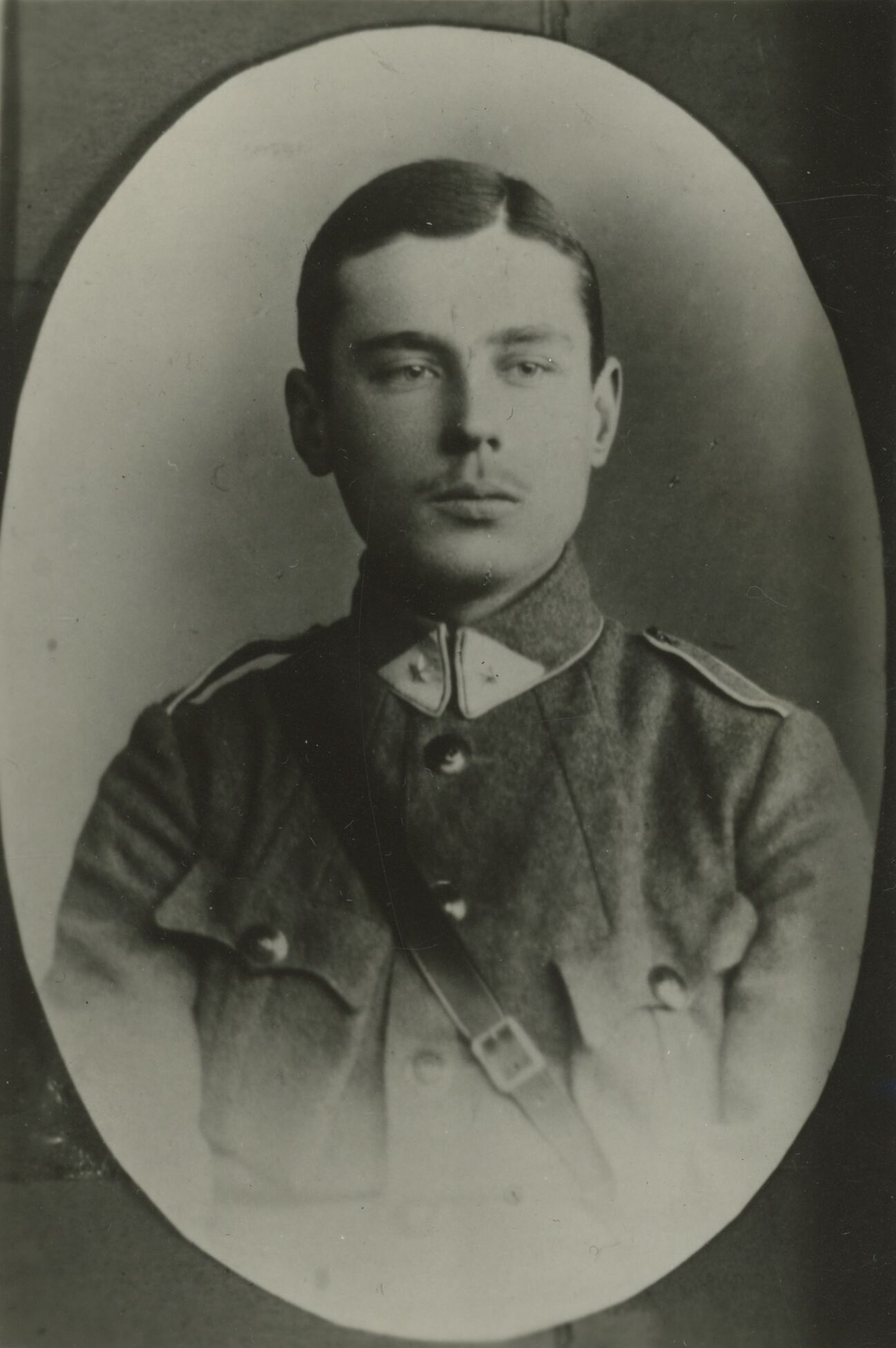
- Putvinskis in military uniform (1920)

Minister of Agriculture of Lithuania
- In office 6 September 1935 – 24 March 1938
- President: Antanas Smetona
- Prime Minister: Juozas Tūbelis
- Preceded by: Jonas Pranas Aleksa
- Succeeded by: Juozas Tūbelis

Personal details
- Born: 3 August 1898 Pavėžupis, Russian Empire
- Died: 4 April 1942 (aged 43) Gorky (Nizhny Novgorod), Soviet Union
- Party: Lithuanian Nationalist Union
- Parents: Vladas Putvinskis (father); Emilija Putvinskienė (mother)
- Education: War School of Kaunas; University of Halle

Stasys Putvinskis or Pūtvis (Note: Reportedly, "Pūtvis" is the original Lithuanian surname of the family derived from the Pūtvė village that was a hillfort during the 14th-century Lithuanian Crusade. It was changed to "Putvinskis" due to Polonization. Putvinskis' children officially changed their surname to Pūtvis in 1938.) (3 August 1898 – 4 April 1942) was a Lithuanian military officer, agronomist, and politician. He served as the Minister of Agriculture in 1935–1938.

Putvinskis was born to a family of Lithuanian nobles that owned a large farm in Pavėžupis. His father was Vladas Putvinskis, the founder of the Lithuanian Riflemen's Union. In 1919, Putvinskis volunteered for the Lithuanian Army. With the 1st Hussar Regiment, he saw action in the Polish–Lithuanian War in July–October 1920. He retired from the military in 1922 to study agronomy at the University of Halle. He returned to Lithuania in 1925 and worked at his estates which became an exemplary farm. At the same time, Putvinskis was active in local politics and within the Riflemen's Union.

In September 1935, Putvinskis became Minister of Agriculture under Prime Minister Juozas Tūbelis. He worked on resolving an economic crisis in the agricultural sector and on nature conservation. He resigned after the Polish ultimatum in March 1938. After the Soviet occupation of Lithuania, Putvinskis was arrested by the NKVD and sentenced to eight years in prison. He died at the prison in Gorky (now Nizhny Novgorod) in 1942.

== Biography ==
=== Family ===
Stasys Putvinskis was born on 3 August 1898 in a manor of Pavėžupis. He was the eldest of six siblings. His family traced its noble roots to the times of Grand Duke Vytautas (died in 1430). His father Vladas Putvinskis was active in Lithuanian cultural life and became the founder of the Lithuanian Riflemen's Union. His mother Emilija Putvinskienė was also from the Lithuanian nobility and was a relative of Bishop Motiejus Valančius. Their estates had 350 hectares (860 acres) of land, owned 40 cows and 36 horses, and employed 27 people.

=== Military service and education ===
Putvinskis was educated at home. In 1914, he enrolled at a school of commerce in Liepāja (Libau) but his education was interrupted by World War I. His father was deported to Voskresenskoye in the Nizhny Novgorod Oblast, while his siblings were cut off in Moscow. Only he and his mother were left to care after the family's estates. Despite the difficulties, Putvinskis continued his education at the newly established Lithuanian Gymnasium of Rytas Society in Vilnius.

After graduation, he voluntarily joined the Lithuanian Army in May 1919. He was sent to study at the War School of Kaunas. Putvinskis graduated with the second class in December 1919. He was promoted to lieutenant and assigned to the 1st Hussar Regiment. In July–October 1920, he saw action in the Polish–Lithuanian War near Rykantai, Eišiškės, Lentvaris, Vilnius. He was awarded the Order of the Cross of Vytis for intelligence gathering behind the Polish lines. In February 1921, he became regiment's adjutant. At the time, the regiment was commanded by Povilas Plechavičius.

In September 1922, he was released to the reserve so that he could pursue higher education. He completed an accelerated agronomy course at the University of Halle in Germany in 1925. He returned to Lithuania and worked at his family's estates in Pavėžupis. In 1934, he returned to the military and completed practice at the 2nd Uhlan Regiment. He was released to the reserve in November 1935.

=== Farming ===
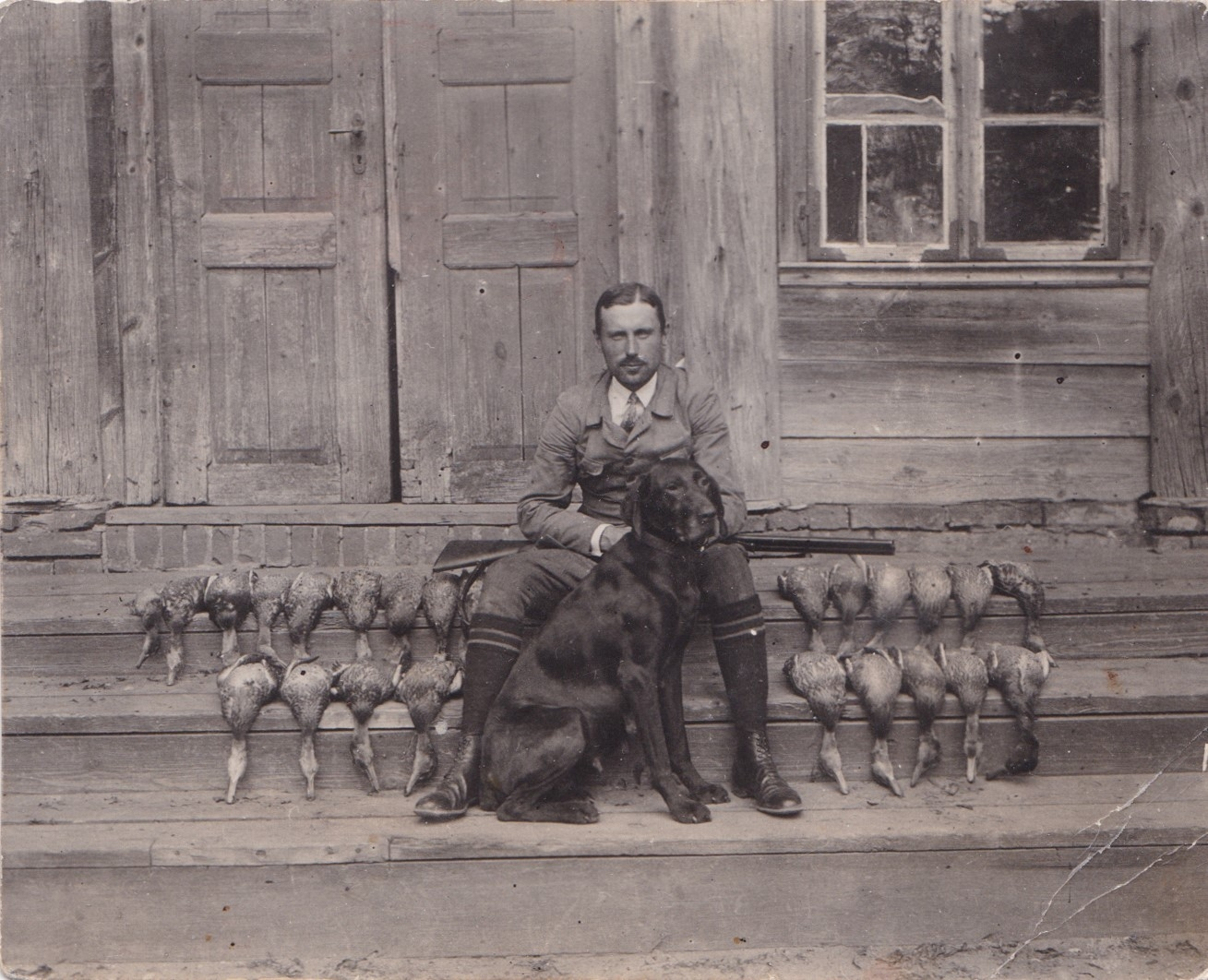
Putvinskis after a successful hunt in Pavėžupis (1933–1934)

Putvinskis' farm in Pavėžupis became an exemplary farm. The land was not particularly fertile, therefore Putvinskis invested in fertilizers and grew lupins. He purchased high quality seed for wheat, barley, potatoes. The farm bread Žemaitukas and Ardennais horses as well as Danish Red cows. He continued his father's practice of commercial breeding of fish in 12 ponds that covered a total of 82 hectares (200 acres). Students from the Dotnuva Agricultural College (present-day Vytautas Magnus University Agriculture Academy) used the farm for practice and experiments.

He was an avid hunter and a few times a year organized large hunts attended by various officials. Duck hunting was particularly popular as they bred in large numbers in the ponds used for fishery. He curated the fishing and hunting section of the Šiauliai Aušra Museum. In summer, his estates were visited by various officials, including zoologist Tadas Ivanauskas, painter Antanas Žmuidzinavičius, doctor Juozas Nemeikša, musicologist Jadvyga Čiurlionytė, writer Balys Sruoga, colonel Mykolas Kalmantas. Once, it was visited by President Antanas Smetona.

In 1938, after resignation from the Ministry of Agriculture, Putvinskis moved to Bubiai Manor that he inherited from his sister-in-law. The manor had 186 hectares (460 acres) of land that included a distillery, diary, silo. Putvinskis reconstructed the main manor house by adding the second floor.

=== Public work and minister ===
For a few years, Putvinskis taught a class on horses at the agricultural school in Šaukėnai. He was the first vice-chairman of the Chamber of Agriculture of Lithuania. He was also active in local politics – he was a member of the councils of Šaukėnai volost and Šiauliai county. Putvinskis participated in the activities of the Lithuanian Riflemen's Union (founded by his father). He was vice-chairman of the 7th (Šiauliai) Regiment and commanded of the 1st Battalion. In 1937, he was elected to the board of the Riflemen's Union.

On 6 September 1935, Putvinskis became Minister of Agriculture in the government of Juozas Tūbelis. He succeeded Jonas Pranas Aleksa who was the Minister of Agriculture since the December 1926 coup d'état that brought President Antanas Smetona to power. According to memoirs of Putvinskis' son, Putvinskis was reluctant to accept the position and felt like "an eagle trapped in a cage" at the ministry. He was the only farmer who served as the Minister of Agriculture in interwar Lithuania.

At the time, Lithuanian agricultural sector suffered a crisis due to the lingering effects of the Great Depression and a substantial decrease in Lithuanian exports to Germany due to the trial of Neumann and Sass. Demanding financial assistance, farmers went on strike in Suvalkija in 1935–1936. Putvinskis worked to combat this crisis. In addition, he founded the Veterinary Academy (present-day Lithuanian University of Health Sciences). He also worked on conservation: established a fund for reforestation, a fund for wildlife and hunting culture, and the first protected area in Žuvintas.

In June 1936, Putvinskis was also elected to the Fourth Seimas. It was controlled by the Lithuanian Nationalist Union and did not play a decisive role in Lithuanian politics. Putvinskis was not very active in the Seimas. He spoke more often when Seimas discussed issued concerning agriculture and infrastructure. On several occasions, he opposed the official positions taken by the government or the Seimas.

On 17 March 1938, Poland delivered an ultimatum to Lithuania demanding to reestablish diplomatic relations that were severed due to the conflict over Vilnius Region since 1920. According to memoirs of General Stasys Raštikis, Putvinskis was the most vocal of government ministers arguing that Lithuania should reject the ultimatum. However, the ultimatum was accepted and the government of Tūbelis resigned on 24 March 1938.

=== Soviet persecution ===
On 12 July 1940, just a month after the Soviet occupation of Lithuania, Putvinskis was arrested by the NKVD and kept in Šiauliai Prison. On 24 May 1941, the Special Council of the NKVD sentenced him to eight years in prison. On 14 June 1941, just a week before the German invasion of the Soviet Union, he was transported first to Staraya Russa and then to the prison in Gorky (now Nizhny Novgorod). He arrived to Gorky on 3 July 1941 and died there on 4 April 1942. The exact location of his burial is unknown.

== Personal life ==
In 1923, Putvinskis married Darija née Zubovaitė (1901–1997), granddaughter of graf Nikolay Zubov and niece of Vladimir Zubov. They met at the University of Halle. They had two daughters and a son. His daughter Julija Daniliauskienė (1926–2009) was a folk artist specializing in papercutting.

Darija Putvinskienė and her three children were deported to Onguday in the Altai Krai during the June deportation in 1941. In summer 1942, they were transferred to Muostakh near Bykovsky on the shores of the Laptev Sea. They were allowed to relocate to Yakutsk in 1947 and return to Lithuania in 1956.

== Awards ==
Putvinskis received the following state awards:

- 1920: Order of the Cross of Vytis (1st degree)
- 1920: Order of the Cross of Vytis (5th degree)
- 1928: Order of the Lithuanian Grand Duke Gediminas (4th degree)
- 1928: Independence Medal (Lithuania)
- 1929: Latvian War of Independence 10 Year Anniversary Commemorative Medal
- 1935: Riflemen's Star
- 1937: Order of the White Star (1st class)
