= Trimitas =

Trimitas (literally: trumpet) is the official magazine of the Lithuanian Riflemen's Union.

The first issue was published in May 1920 in Kaunas. It was a weekly magazine. Its editors included priest Juozas Tumas-Vaižgantas (nominally), Matas Šalčius, Rapolas Skipitis, Teodoras Daukantas, Antanas Žmuidzinavičius, Juozas Purickis, and many others. The circulation grew from 5,000 in 1920 to 25,000 in 1939 and 32,000 in 1940. The magazine and the Riflemen's Union were banned soon after the Soviet occupation of Lithuania in June 1940. Both the union and the magazine were reestablished after Lithuania declared independence in March 1990. The circulation was 11,800 in 1990, 2,000 in 1997, and 1,000 in 2013. In 1992–2009, it was published monthly. Since 2010, it is published every two months.

The most important goals of the magazine were to propagate the riflemen ideology and to recruit new members. The content was varied as it did not restrict itself to only news for the riflemen or contributions from the riflemen. The magazine published local and international news, poetry, literature, articles on warfare, sports, culture, history. Marius Katiliškis published his stories in the magazine. Other contributors included Antanas Vienuolis and Janis Rainis.
