= Lithuanian Riflemen's Union =

Lithuanian Riflemen's Union (Lietuvos šaulių sąjunga)
- Insignia of the Lithuanian Riflemen's Union
- Active: 1919–1940; 1944–1953 (Guerrilla war in the Baltic states); 1954–1989 (in exile); 1989–present
- Country: Lithuania
- Allegiance: Lithuanian Armed Forces
- Type: Paramilitary organization
- Role: Civilian self-defence organization, Light infantry Home guard
- Size: 18,286
- Garrison/HQ: Kaunas
- Nickname: Šauliai
- Anniversaries: June 27, 1919 (founding); September 20, 1989 (restoration)
- Engagements: Lithuanian Wars of Independence; Klaipėda Revolt; June uprising Lithuanian partisans January Events in Lithuania
- Website: sauliusajunga.lt

Commanders
- Current commander: Colonel Linas Idzelis

Insignia
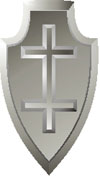
- LRU member's badge

- Flag

The Lithuanian Riflemen's Union (LRU, Lithuanian: Lietuvos šaulių sąjunga), also referred to as Šauliai (the Riflemen; from Lithuanian: šaulys for rifleman), is a paramilitary organization supported by the Government of Lithuania and regulated by the dedicated law.

It is active in three main areas: military training, sport, and culture. In peacetime, it prepares Lithuanian citizens for armed and civil resistance as well as supports state institutions with volunteers during national emergencies. During the state of war, its armed formations fall under the direct command of the Lithuanian Armed Forces.

== History ==
=== Establishment ===
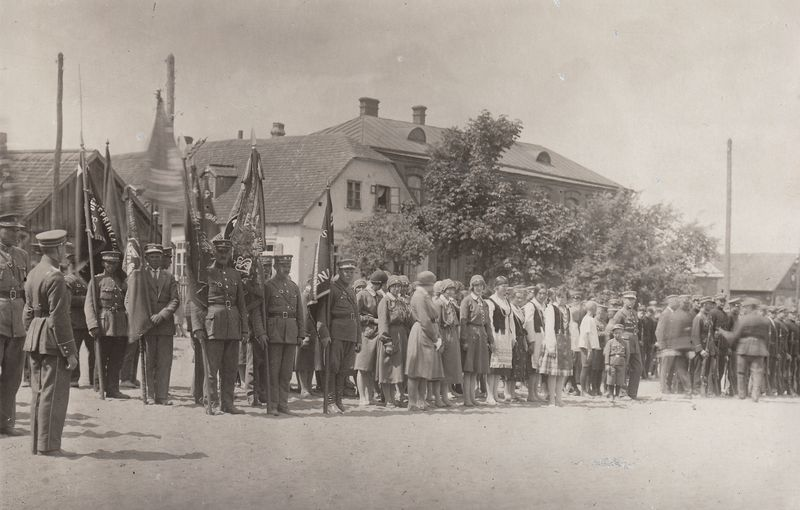
Event of the 12th Regiment of the Lithuanian Riflemen Union in Panevėžys in 1930. Note the child donning a uniform at the front of the crowd on the left.

The Lithuanian Riflemen's Union was established in Kaunas on 27 June 1919 as a shooting section within the Lithuanian Sport Union. Several historic events determine its establishment – Lithuania had just declared independence and was asserting it in wars against the Bolshevik Red Army, the West Russian Volunteer Army and the young Polish Armed Forces.

Vladas Putvinskis and Matas Šalčius were the Union's most important activists, and Putvinskis became its first commander and main ideologue. Both of them almost simultaneously thought of creating a paramilitary group, but they differently envisioned its scope.

In 1919, Matas Šalčius, together with Antanas Vienuolis-Žukauskas, Faustas Kirša and other employees of the Press Office decided to form an organisation that would protect Kaunas; they intended to call it the Steel Battalion. Concurrently another initiative was launched by the Putvinskis-led group, and they prepared the organisation's statute. They aimed to support the Lithuanian military in all of Lithuania. In June 1919, the Press Office employees invited Putvinskis to their meeting. Putvinskis joined the organisation and became one of the most active members.

There were many famous and important Lithuanians among the founders of the Union, including writers Antanas Vienuolis-Žukauskas, Juozas Tumas-Vaižgantas, and Balys Sruoga, poet Faustas Kirša, painter Antanas Žmuidzinavičius and zoologist Tadas Ivanauskas. Initially, only civilians participated, but later soldiers and officers started to actively join its ranks. This reflected the organisation's aim – to unite civilians who wanted to support the military.

The ideology and the guiding principles of the LRU were influenced by earlier similar organisations: Sokol in Czechoslovakia, Civil Guard in Finland, and a Swiss paramilitary organisation. Putvinskis stated that: "the Riflemen's Union is an organisation of free citizens, who volunteer their time and efforts for the sake of protecting their homeland."

=== Administrative division ===
After its establishment in 1919, the LRU quickly expanded throughout Lithuania; many guerilla fighters from recent wars joined the Union. In the beginning, the organisation was divided into sections covering the entire Lithuanian territory, and the sections had riflemen units. In 1925, an administrative reform was carried out, dividing the organisation into regiments, in line with the administrative division of Lithuania into districts. In 1936, a separate regiment was created for railway industry workers and members of their immediate families.

=== Activities in 1919–1940 ===
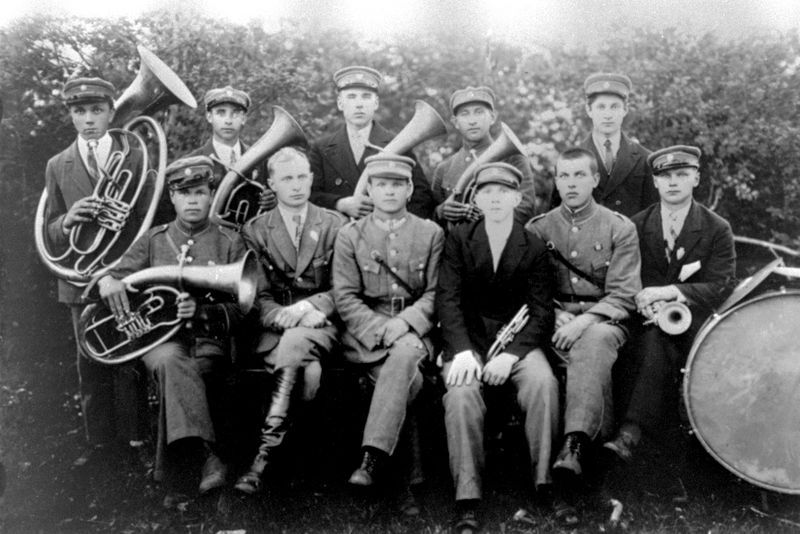
One of the many orchestras of the Lithuanian Riflemen (Salakas, 1931)

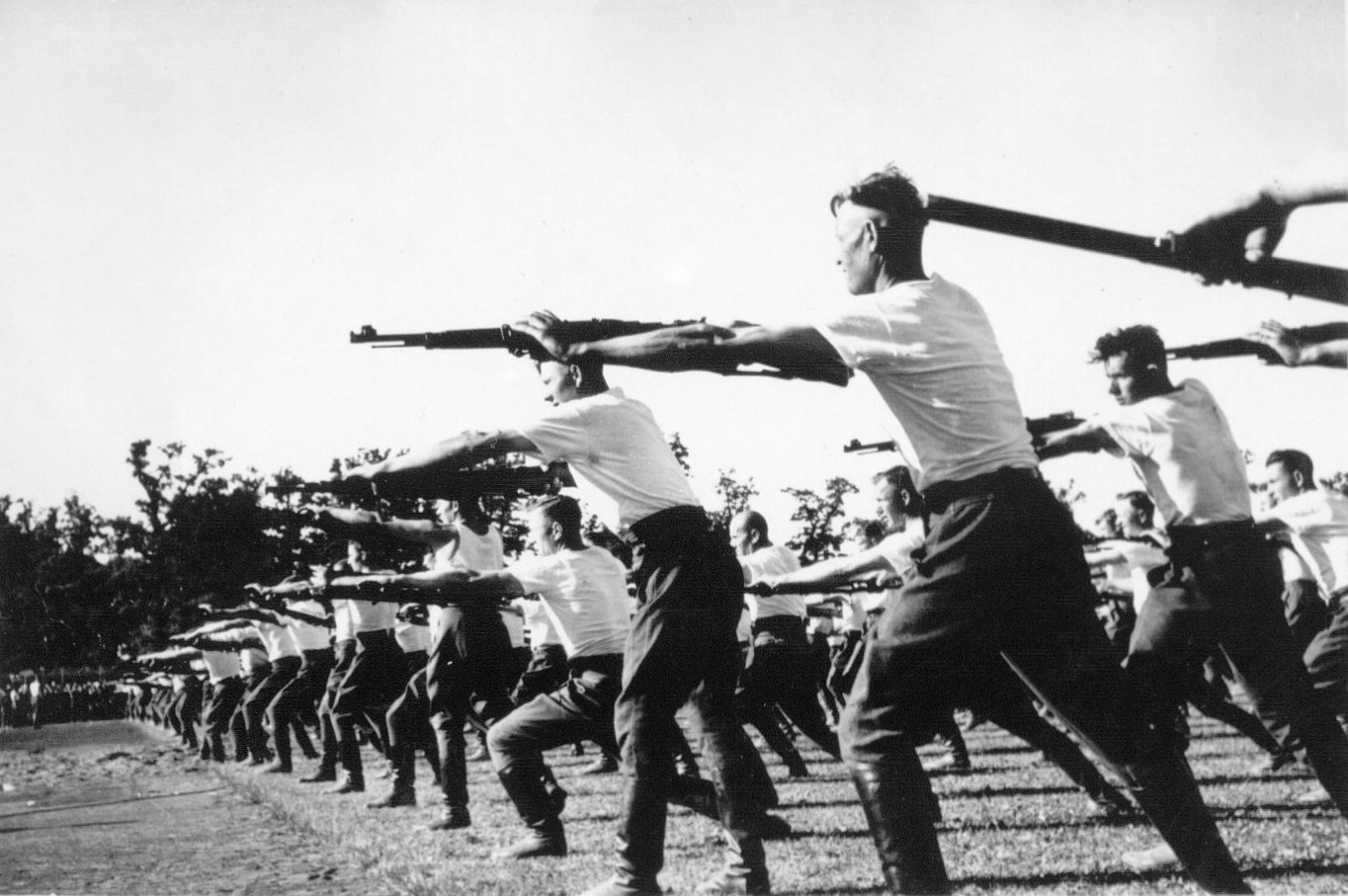
Exercises of the Lithuanian Riflemen, 1939

The LRU had three main areas of activities in 1919-1940 – culture, sport, and military training. The riflemen's units had theatres, libraries, and sport clubs alongside orchestras and military bands. The union published the weekly magazine Trimitas. The riflemen were required to educate themselves and to participate in educating the society. To help with that they aimed at building riflemen centres in all cities and towns, where the union was active, with their duty being to national defense. Centres were built in Utena, Tauragė, Alytus, and some other cities and towns. The centres served as meeting and training places for riflemen, and housing their clubs, administration and cultural activities.

The organisation received a unique legal basis. In 1921, 1924, and 1935, laws on the LRU were passed that defined its activities and functions, intended to restrict its autonomy and tie it as closely as possible to the Ministry of Defence and the armed forces. In 1935, the LRU became directly subordinate to the Chief of Defence. The law abolished dual leadership – previously the organisation had been led by the Chairman of the Central Board, elected by riflemen, and by the LRU Commander, appointed by the Minister of Defence. Thus the riflemen were fully integrated in the country's defensive structure, and the district military commanders became commanding officers of rifle regiments.

In 1935, the LRU had 33,276 members, of whom 24,976 were soldiers. The organisation had 7,371 rifles and 32 machine guns.

By 1940, the LRU had become one of the country's most popular and largest organizations, with about 62,000 members, both men and women. The LRU had units of university students, including the student corporations Saja and Živilė. Many famous politicians (Antanas Smetona, Rapolas Skipitis, Mykolas Sleževičius, Juozas Urbšys), artists and other members of the cultural elite (Antanas Žmuidzinavičius, Unė Babickaitė-Graičiūnienė also known as Une Bay, Antanas Vienuolis-Žukauskas, Petras Vaičiūnas), scientists (Tadas Ivanauskas, Augustinas Janulaitis, Liudas Vailionis, Antanas Graugrokas) were active in the union. Even though most members originated from the farmer class, the main principles of the Union also appealed to other classes. Members of the organization are registered in the journal.

=== Soviet and German occupation ===
On 15 June 1940, the Soviet Union occupied Lithuania, and the riflemen, like the rest of the military, were ordered not to resist. Aleksandras Barauskas, a rifleman and border guard, was killed by Red Army soldiers in the early morning of June 15. The new Soviet People's Government of Lithuania immediately took steps to liquidate the union. Its commander, Colonel Pranas Saladžius, was dismissed on 19 June 1940, and the Chief of Defence division General Vincas Vitkauskas, who was cooperating with the Soviets, ordered the riflemen to hand over their arms to the military on 25 June 1940. On 13 July 13, 1940 a Soviet order to liquidate the union was issued. In subsequent months, a number of the most active riflemen were arrested as "enemies of the people" and sent to various gulags. In June 1941, the Soviets started a mass deportation that targeted "anti-Soviet elements", including the riflemen. Among those deported were LRU's commander Colonel Pranas Saladžius, the honorary commander of the women's section Emilija Putvinskienė, commander of the Utena Regiment Lt. Col. Pranas Bronevičius, and head of the culture section Vincas Daudzvaras. The remaining riflemen began forming anti-Soviet groups and played a role in the uprising of 23 June 1941, but there is no specific data on how many members participated.

On 22 June 1941, Nazi Germany invaded the Soviet Union and the Baltic states. Initially treated as 'liberators' the situation later became one of 'passive resistance' against the Nazis. During the Nazi occupation, ex-riflemen formed several underground organisations, such as Laisvės šauliai (Freedom's Riflemen), aimed at restoring Lithuania's independence.

When the Soviets returned in mid-1944, many riflemen joined the Lithuanian partisans and fought a guerrilla war against the Soviet Union. Two out of eight guerrillas who signed the declaration of the Union of Lithuanian Freedom Fighters on 16 February 1949, were ex-riflemen: Leonardas Grigonis-Užpalis and Juozas Šibaila-Merainis. Some other ex-riflemen were also prominent among the guerrillas, including Juozas Vitkus-Kazimieraitis, Zigmas Drunga-Mykolas Jonas, Dominykas Jėčys-Ąžuolis, and Vladas Montvydas-Žemaitis.

=== Restoration of the Union ===
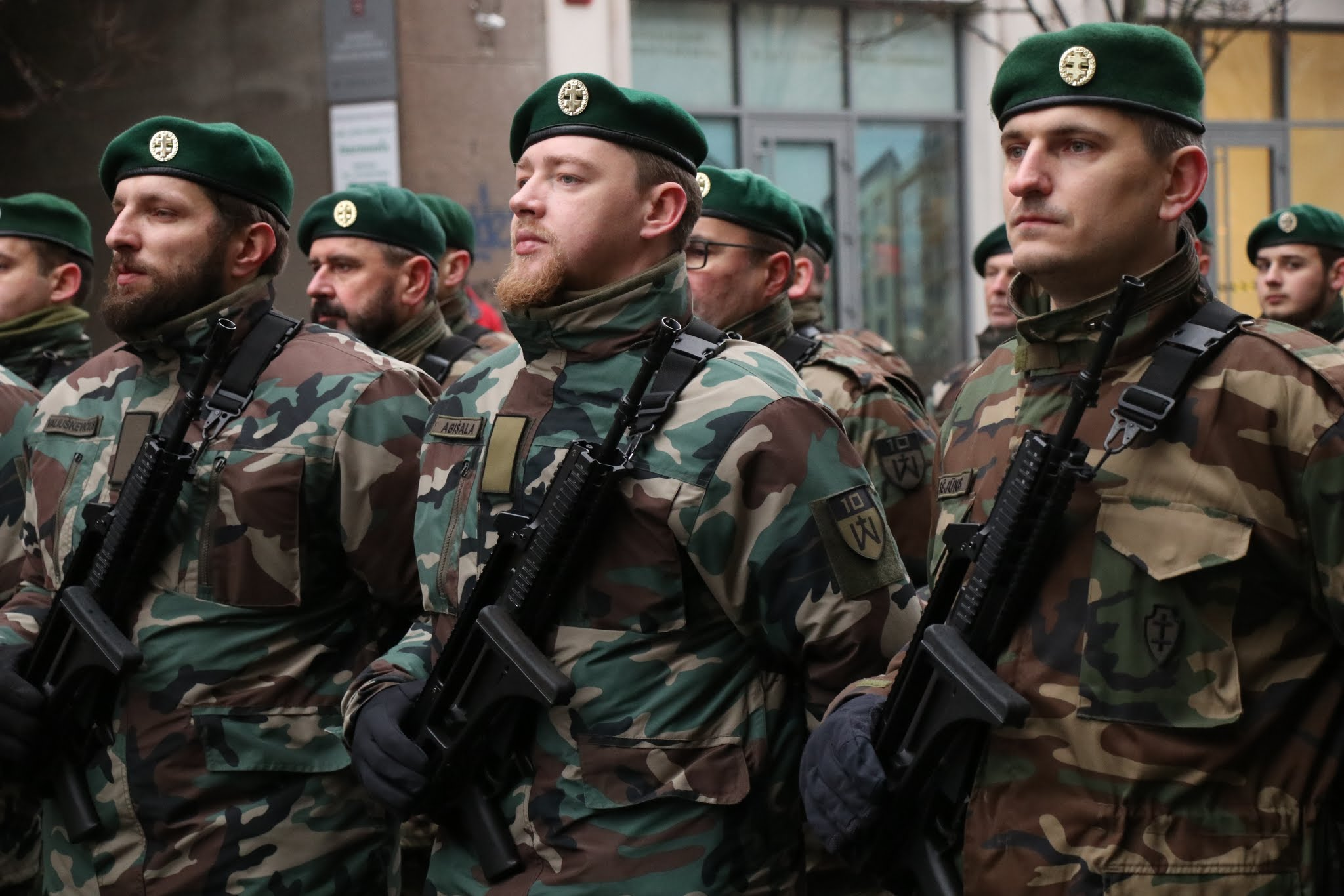
Lithuanian Riflemen's Union Combat Members formation

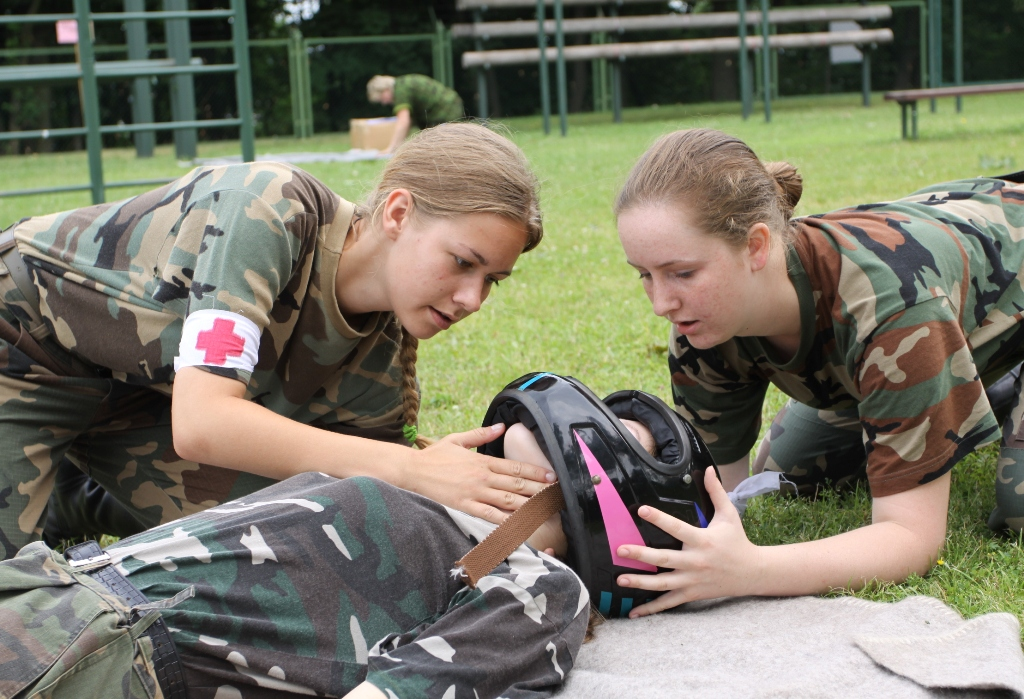
First aid training

The first attempts to restore the LRU were made still during the occupation when the movement for reform started. On 1 June 1989, during a protest in Kaunas by a club of former exiles and the Democrat party, the restoration of the LRU was officially announced. On 20 September 1989, the activists took an oath in Kelmė, at the grave of Putvinskis, the founder and ideologue of the LRU. That day is considered to be the day of the restoration of the LRU in Lithuania.

The members of the restored Lithuanian Riflemen's Union were active in the movement for reform; they were especially active in guarding the Lithuanian Parliament and other State buildings during the January Events in 1991 and later. On 13 January 1991, two members of Vilnius riflemen regiment were killed: Ignas Šimulionis and Darius Gerbutavičius. On May 19, at a border crossing point in Krakūnai a riflemen and a border guard Gintaras Žagunis was shot to death.

== Administrative divisions ==
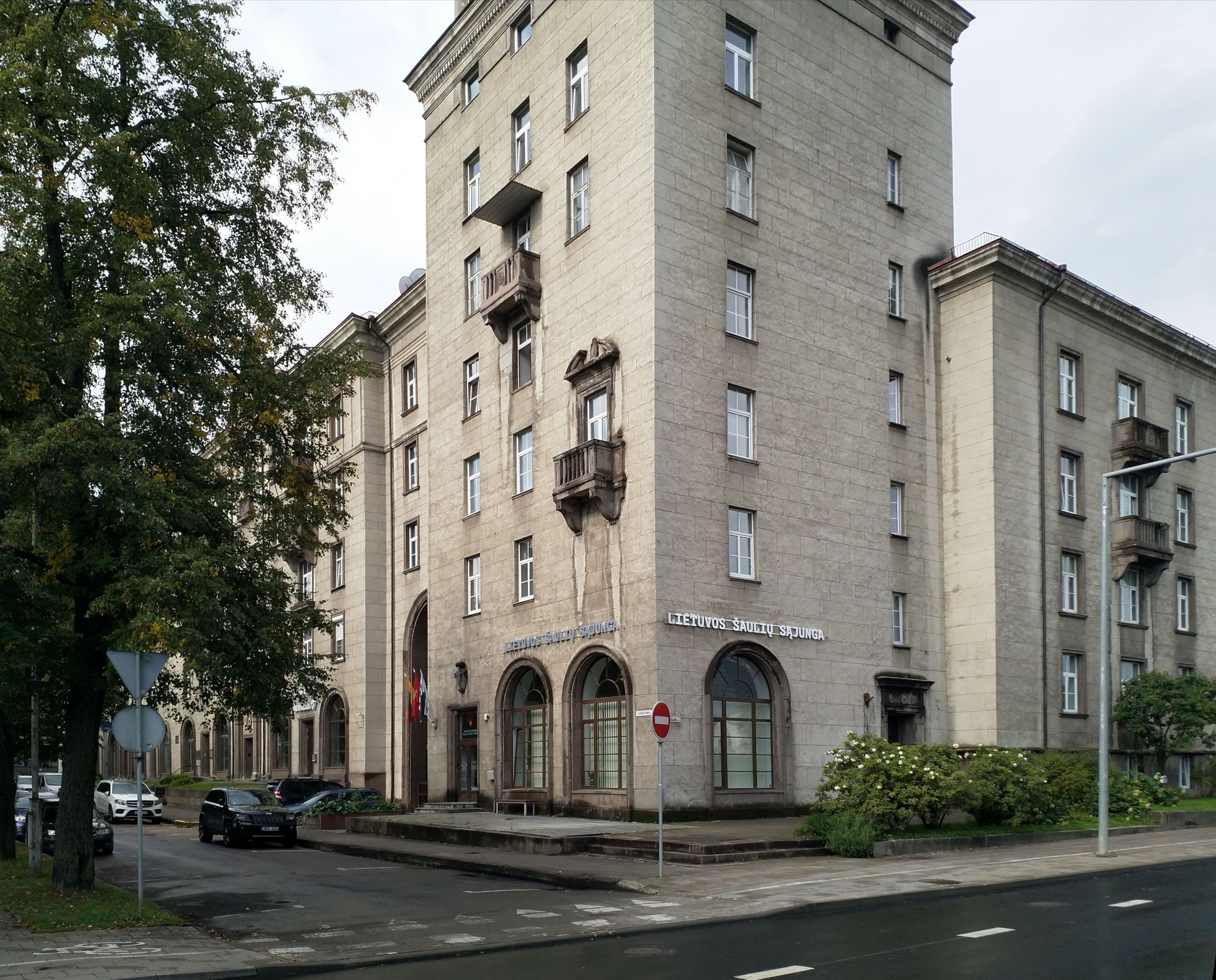
Headquarters in Vilnius, Washington Square

Currently, the LRU is divided into ten riflemen regiments (šaulių rinktinė):

- Officer Antanas Juozapavičius 1st Territorial Riflemen Unit (Lithuanian: Karin. Antano Juozapavičiaus 1-oji ŠR)
- Vytautas the Great 2nd Territorial Riflemen Unit (Lithuanian: Vytauto Didžioji 2-oji šaulių rinktinė)
- West (Sea) Riflemen 3rd Territorial Riflemen Unit (Lithuanian: Vakarų (Jūros) šaulių 3-oji šaulių rinktinė)
- Suvalkija 4th Territorial Riflemen Unit (Lithuanian: Suvalkijos šaulių 4-oji šaulių rinktinė)
- Alfonsas Smetona 5th Territorial Riflemen Unit (Lithuanian: Alfonso Smetonos 5-oji šaulių rinktinė)
- Gen. Povilo Plechavičiaus 6th Territorial Riflemen Unit (Lithuanian: Gen. Povilo Plechavičiaus 6-oji ŠR)
- Kęstutis 7th Territorial Riflemen Unit (Lithuanian: LDK Kęstučio 7-oji šaulių rinktinė)
- Samogitia 8th Territorial Riflemen Unit (Lithuanian: Žemaitijos šaulių 8-oji rinktinė)
- Prano Saladžiaus 9th Territorial Riflemen Unit (Lithuanian: Plk. Prano Saladžiaus 9-oji šaulių rinktinė)
- King Mindaugas 10th Territorial Riflemen Unit (Lithuanian: Karaliaus Mindaugo 10-oji šaulių rinktinė)

Additionally, the LRU maintains several units abroad:

- In the United States and Canada: Lithuanian Riflemen's Union in Exile
  - Chicago: Vytautas the Great Riflemen's Team; Gen. T. Daukantas Marine Rifle Company; Baltic Marine Rifle Company
  - Cicero: Klaipėda Marine Rifle Company
  - Detroit: Lighthouse Marine Rifle Company
  - Los Angeles: Juozas Daumantas Rifle Company
  - St. Petersburg: Kalanta Rifle Company
  - Boston: Vanagaitis Rifle Company
  - Miami Beach: A. Ramanauskas-Vanagas Rifle Company
  - Toronto: The Rotten Rifles Company
  - Montreal: United Company of King Mindaugas and Neringa Riflemen
- In Finland and Estonia: 600th Company, Finland-Estonia Platoon (Lithuanian: 6ŠR, 600 kuopos Suomijos-Estijos būrys)
- In Norway: 316 AB
- In Denmark: 318 AB
- In Germany: 315 AB; LRU Support Union in Germany
- In Luxembourg: 2ŠR, Luxembourg Platoon (Lithuanian: 2ŠR, Liuksemburgo būrys)
- In Belgium, Netherlands, and France: Separate Rifle Corps of the Kingdom of Belgium and the Netherlands; 1028 (BENFRA) AB
- In United Kingdom: 707 AB; Unit for work with young riflemen; LRU Support Unit in the United Kingdom; LRU branch in Northern Ireland
- In Ukraine: LRU Support Unit in Ukraine

== Membership ==
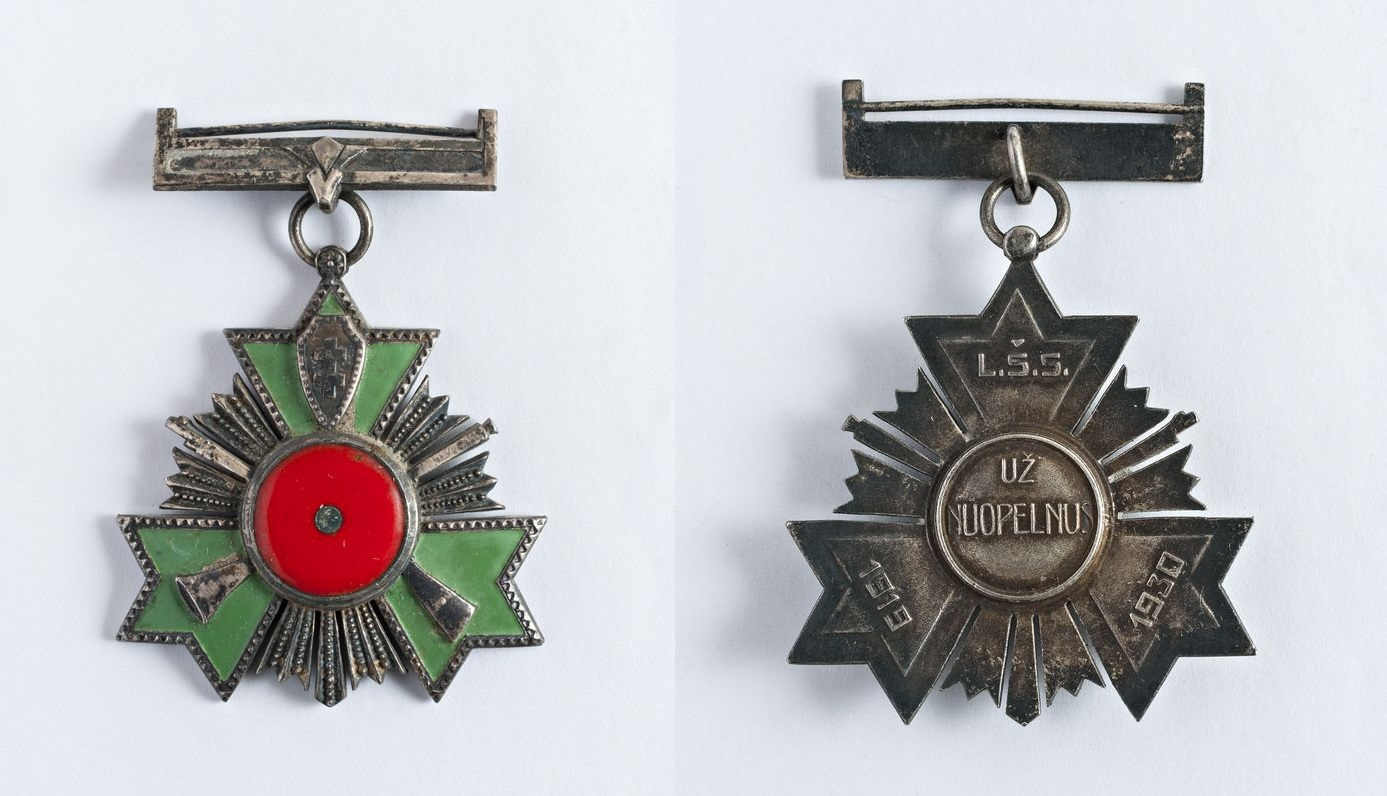
Order of Star of the Lithuanian Riflemen's Union, 1930

After Lithuania re-established independence in 1990, the organization was restored but it has not regained its former popularity or influence. As of 2020, the membership of the Lithuanian Riflemen's Union is 14,000 (in the interwar period it was 62,000). Half of the members are Young Riflemen (11–18 years old), 40% are Combat Riflemen (18 years old until death) and the remaining are Non-combat Riflemen.

The LRU greatly values its traditions, so the activities are similar to what they were in the past: there are sport and culture activities, the LRU journal Trimitas (the Trumpet) is being published, the members are encouraged to take interest in the history of the country.

According to the law on the Lithuanian Riflemen's Union, any Lithuanian citizen who is over 11 and speaks the official language can join the Union. The members are divided into two groups:

1. Young riflemen – youth, 11–18 years old. All young riflemen give an honorary pledge when joining the Union. The young riflemen receive training based on a 4 level programme. On each level they study Lithuanian history, receive training in leadership and military training. At the end of the level they pass an examination, and get a certificate and a sign. Starting in 2002, young riflemen summer camps, as well as summer courses and the international training camp "Žalgiris", are organised every summer.

2. Riflemen – persons over 18, who give a rifleman's oath. The riflemen are preparing for armed and unarmed resistance. The LRU Command also operates a militia band, guard of honor company, a sport and technology club. Riflemen belonging to the fighting units guard various locations in Lithuania.

The LRU operates according to a law on LRU, adopted by the Lithuanian parliament in 2010, and a Statute approved by the Ministry of Defence. The highest ruling body of the Union is the Conference of Members. It decides on the most important matters of the Organisation, adopts decisions and approves the Commander of the LRU who is selected by the Minister of Defence. The current Commander of the LRU is lieutenant colonel Linas Idzelis who started his term in 2023.

The LRU actively cooperates with the governmental institutions: the Lithuanian military, Police department, Fire and Rescue Department, Lithuanian State Border Guard Service and others.

=== Riflemen students ===
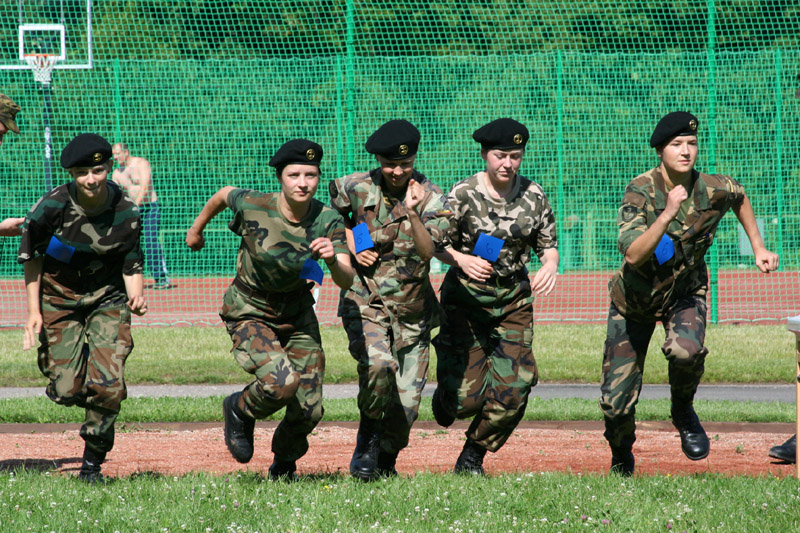
Training exercises of young riflemen

The LRU also includes a riflemen student corporation SAJA. The word "saja" is a Lithuanian neologism, coined by riflemen students for the word "corporation", when they created the first student riflemen corporation in Vytautas Magnus University in 1934. In 2007, a club for riflemen students was established, and on 19 May 2010 it became the Lithuanian riflemen student corporation SAJA.

The corporation aims to promote the riflemen union in universities and to unite riflemen students. The corporation has sections in Vilnius, Kaunas, and Klaipėda. Members participate in the activities of the LRU, help in organizing the summer camps for young riflemen, cooperate with other university organisations.

=== Riflemen Union in exile ===
In Chicago, on 7 March 1954, the riflemen who had fled Lithuania due to World War II declared the re-establishment of the LRU, under the name of the National Guard of Lithuania in Exile. The main activists included Mantautas, Pūtvytė-Mantautienė, Valatkaitis, Kalmantas and others. Sections of the organisation were active in the United States, the UK, Canada, and Australia.

Currently, the National Guard of Lithuania in Exile forms an integral part of the LRU. It is headed by Julius Butkus and is active in the United States and Canada, and supports both the Union and the Armed Forces.

== Leadership ==
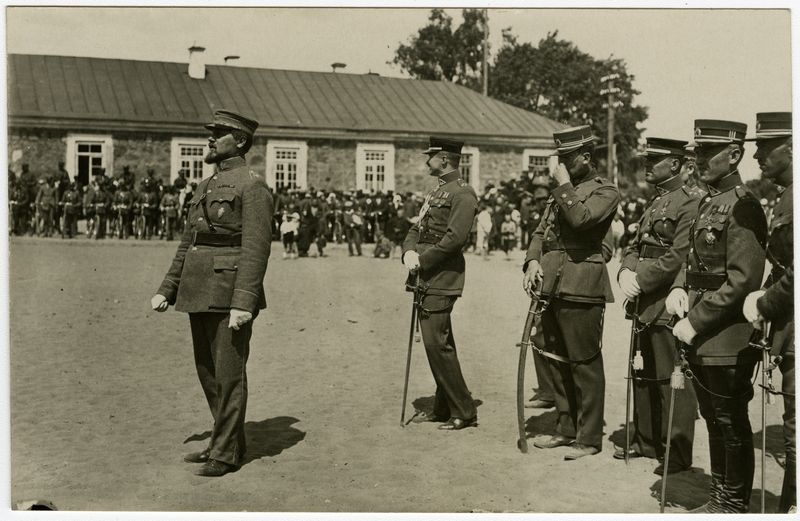
Antanas Žmuidzinavičius leads riflemen celebrations in 1930

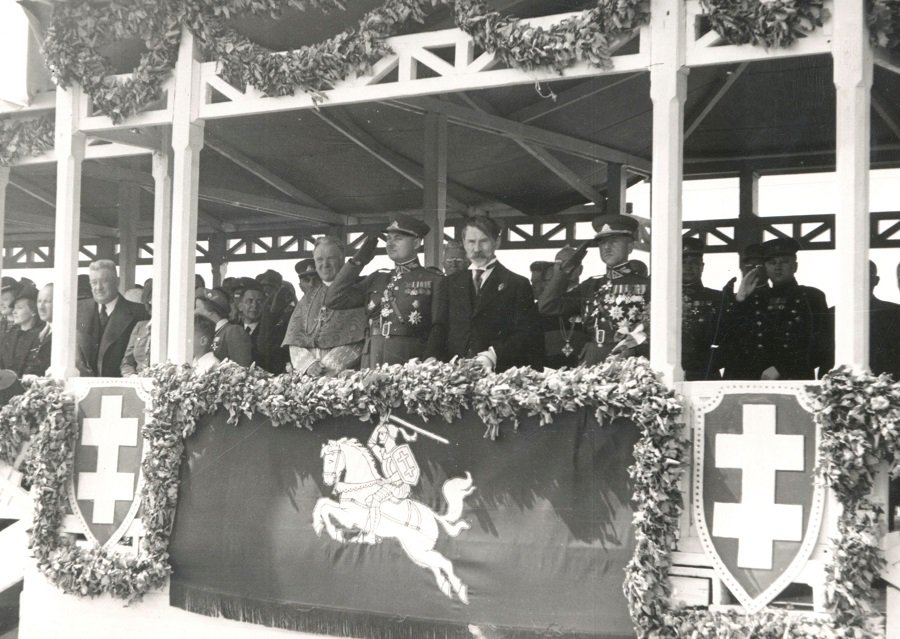
Celebration of the 20th anniversary of the Lithuanian Riflemen's Union

=== Commanders-in-Chief of Union ===
LRU Commanders-in-Chief were:

- Vladas Putvinskis (1919–1922)
- Pranas Klimaitis (1922–1925)
- Mykolas Kalmantas (1925–1935)
- Pranas Saladžius (1935–1940)
- Romualdas Zykus (1989–1990)
- Aleksandras Bendinskas (1990)
- Gediminas Jankus (1990–1994)
- Rimvydas Mintautas (1994–1997)
- Leonardas Bakaitis (1997–1999)
- Jonas Gečas (1999–2000)
- Bronislovas Vizbaras (acting, 2000–2001)
- Juozas Širvinskas (2001–2010)
- Antanas Plieskis (2010–2014)
- Liudas Gumbinas (2014–2017)
- Gintaras Koryzna (2017–2020)
- Albertas Dapkus (2020–2023)
- Linas Idzelis (since 2023)

=== Chairmen ===
LRU Chairmen were:

- Vladas Putvinskis (1919–1922)
- Vincas Krėvė-Mickevičius (1922–1924)
- Stasys Šilingas (1924–1925)
- Matas Šalčius (1925–1926)
- Teodoras Daukantas (1926)
- Liudas Vailionis (1926–1927)
- Rapolas Skipitis (1927–1928)
- Vladas Putvinskis (1928–1929)
- Antanas Žmuidzinavičius (1929–1934)

=== Ranks for combat riflemen ===
National headquarters

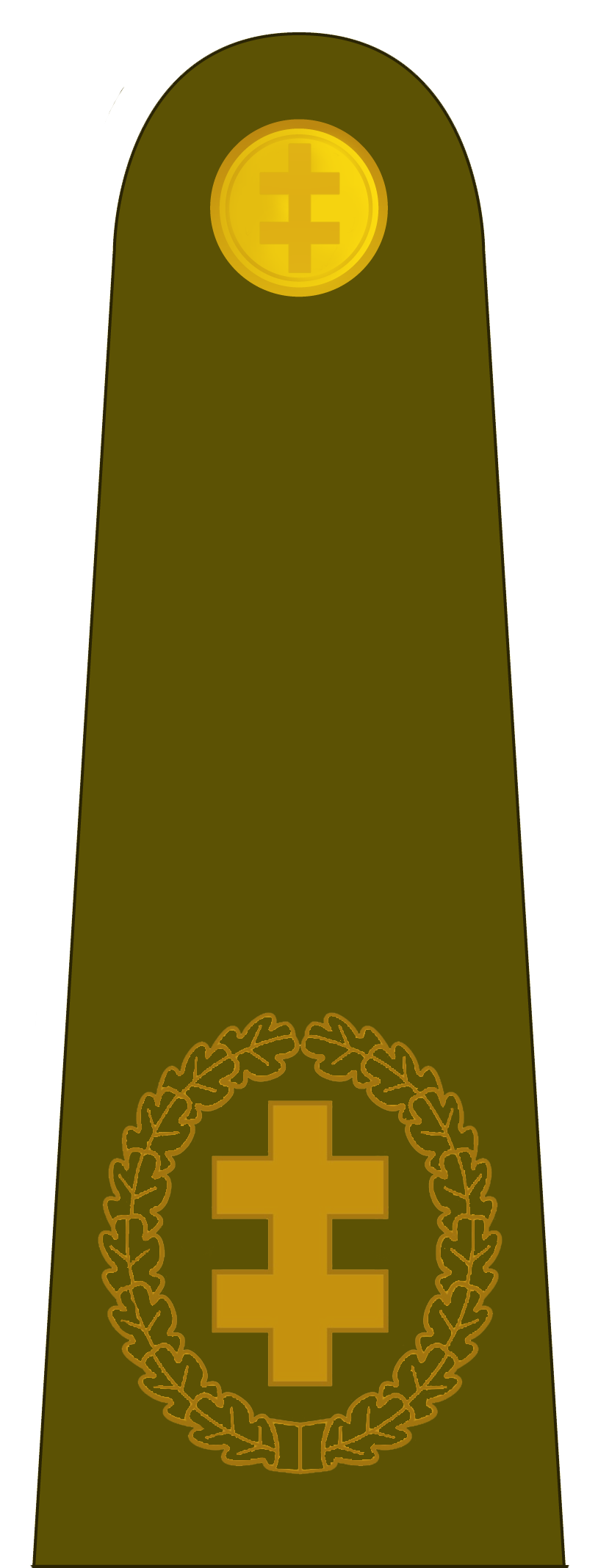
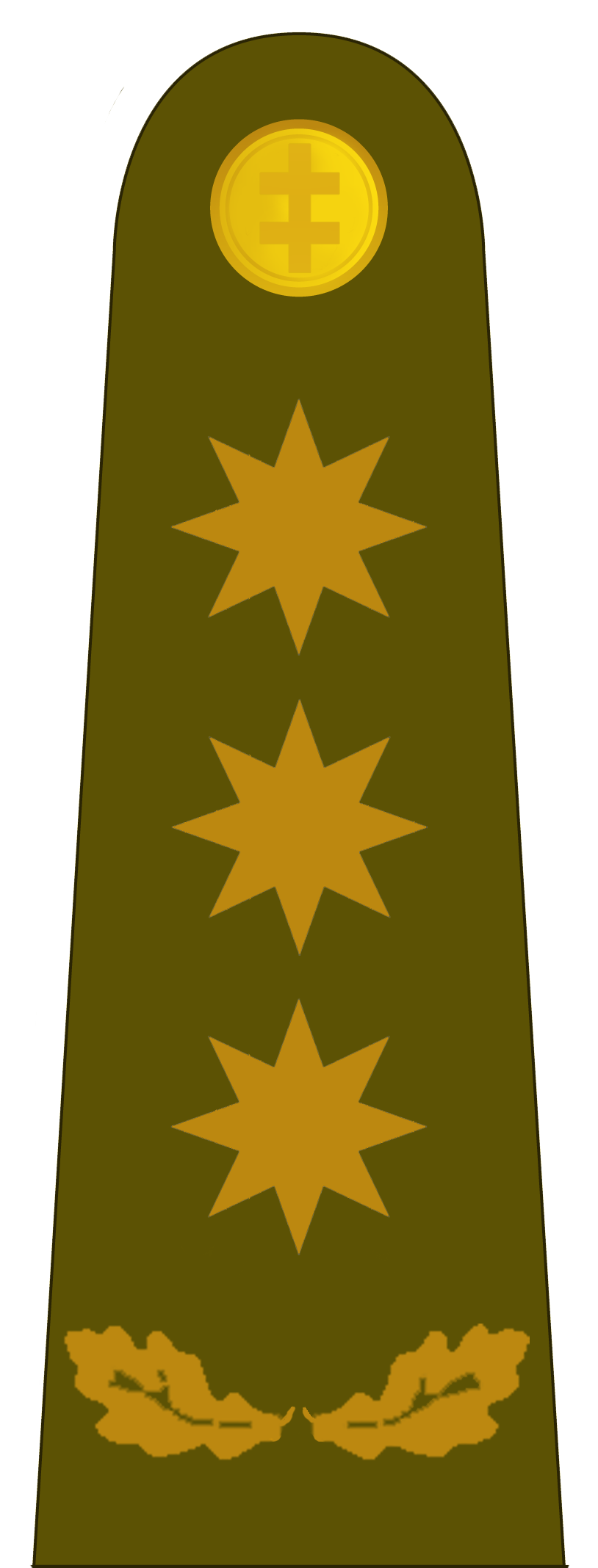
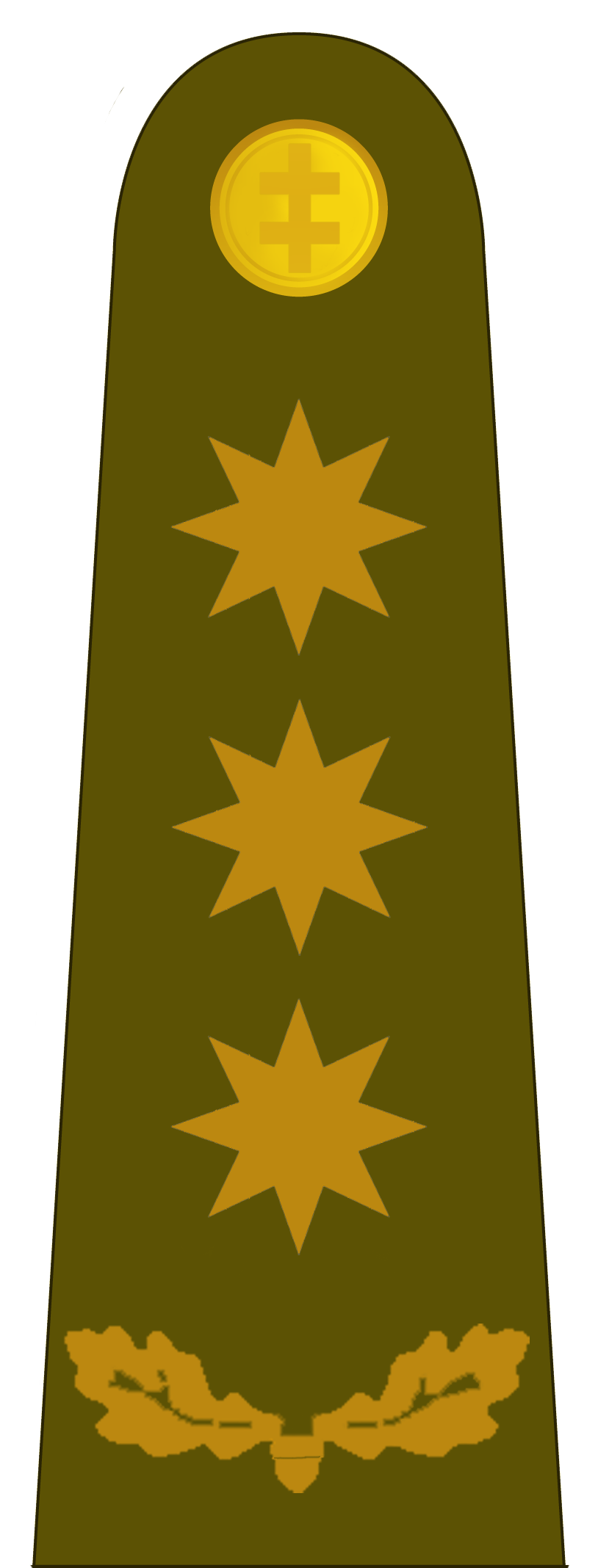
Rank group	General officers	Field/senior officers
Lithuanian Riflemen's Union
Lithuanian Riflemen's Union	Lietuvos Šaulių Sąjungos vadas	Lietuvos Šaulių Sąjungos vado pavaduotojas	Lietuvos Šaulių Sąjungos vado pavaduotojas, jaunųjų šaulių vadas

Officers

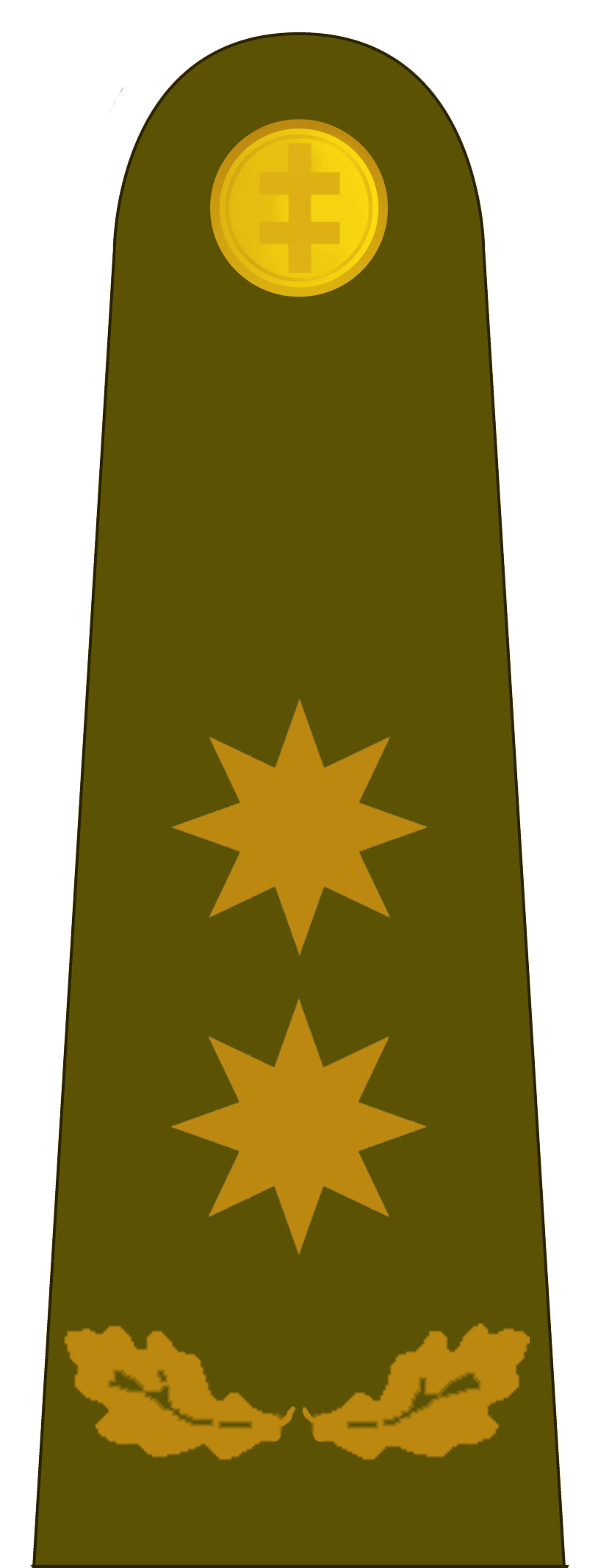
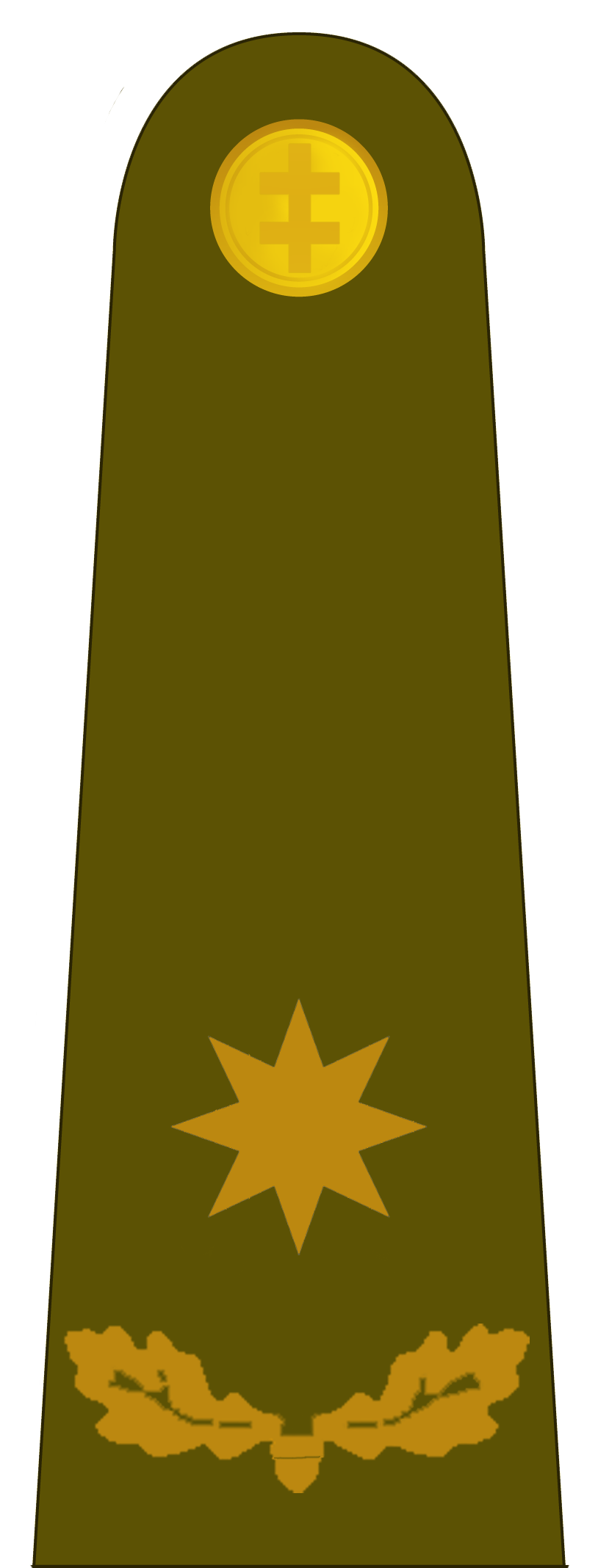
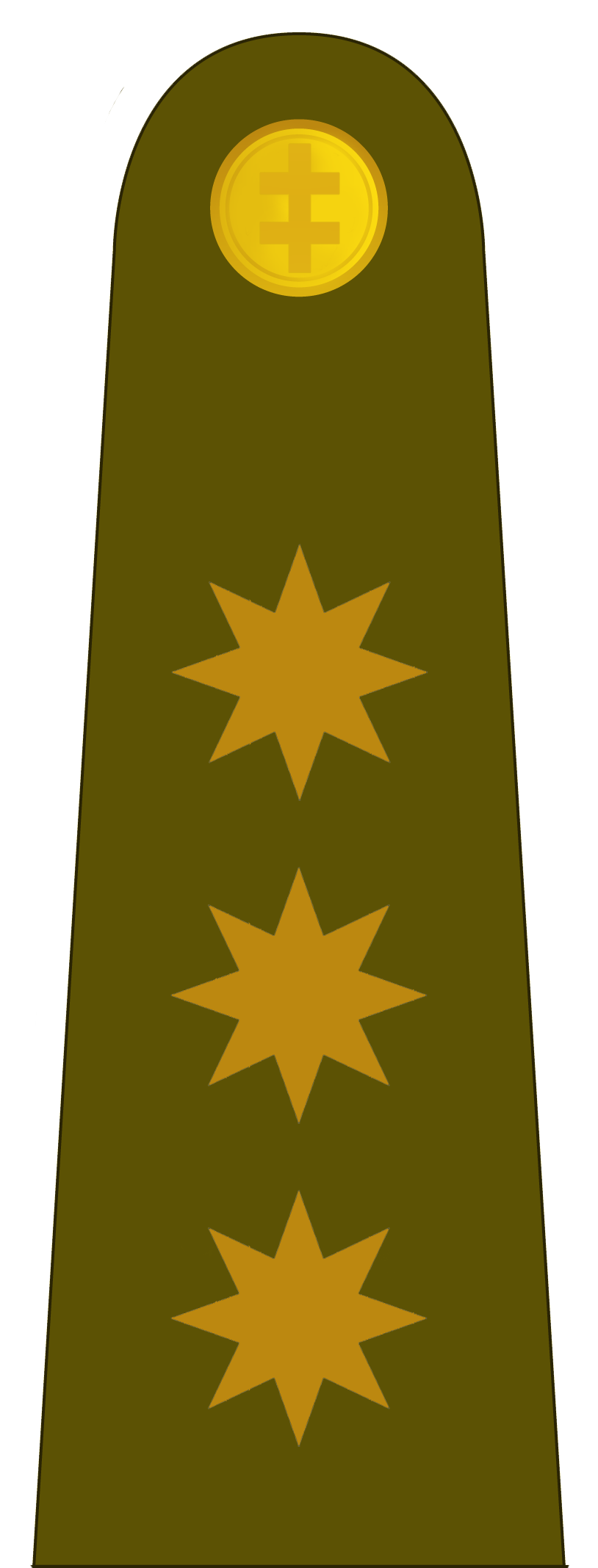
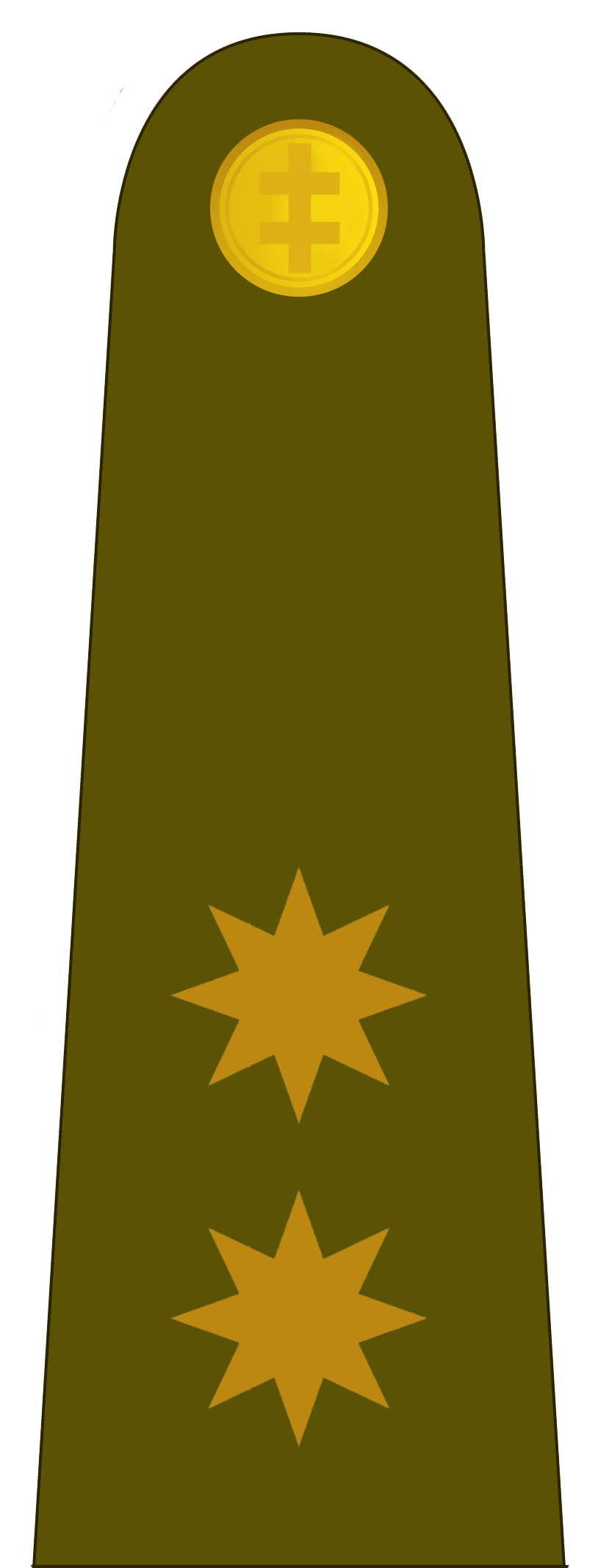
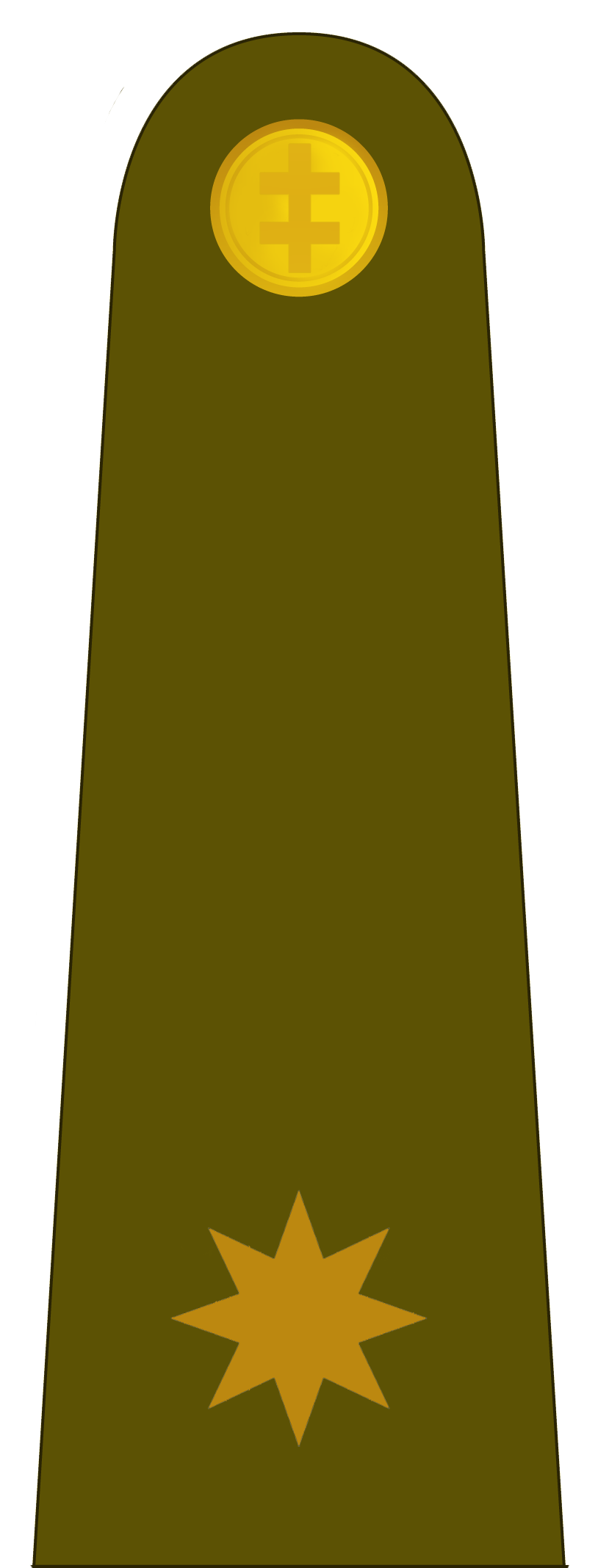
Rank group	Field/senior officers		Junior officers
Lithuanian Riflemen's Union
Lithuanian Riflemen's Union	Rinktinės vadas	Rinktinės vado pavaduotojas	Kuopos vadas	Kuopos vado pavaduotojas	Būrio vadas

Other ranks

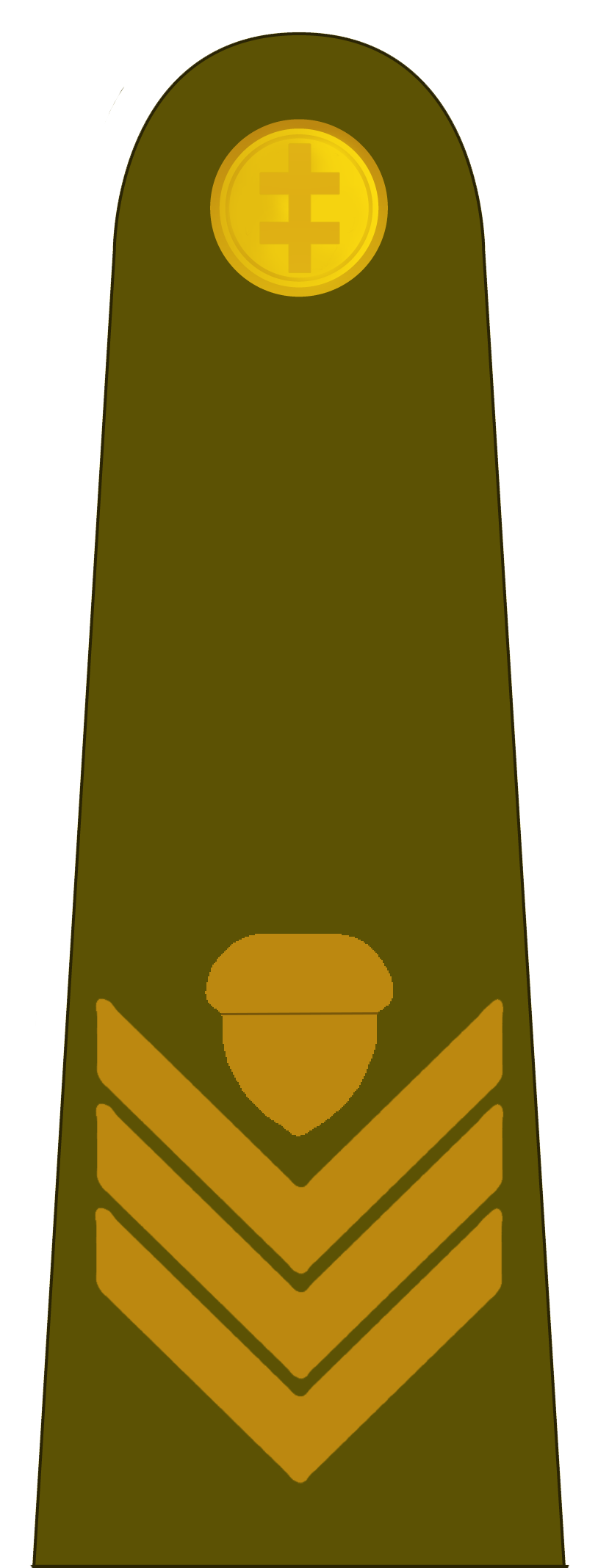
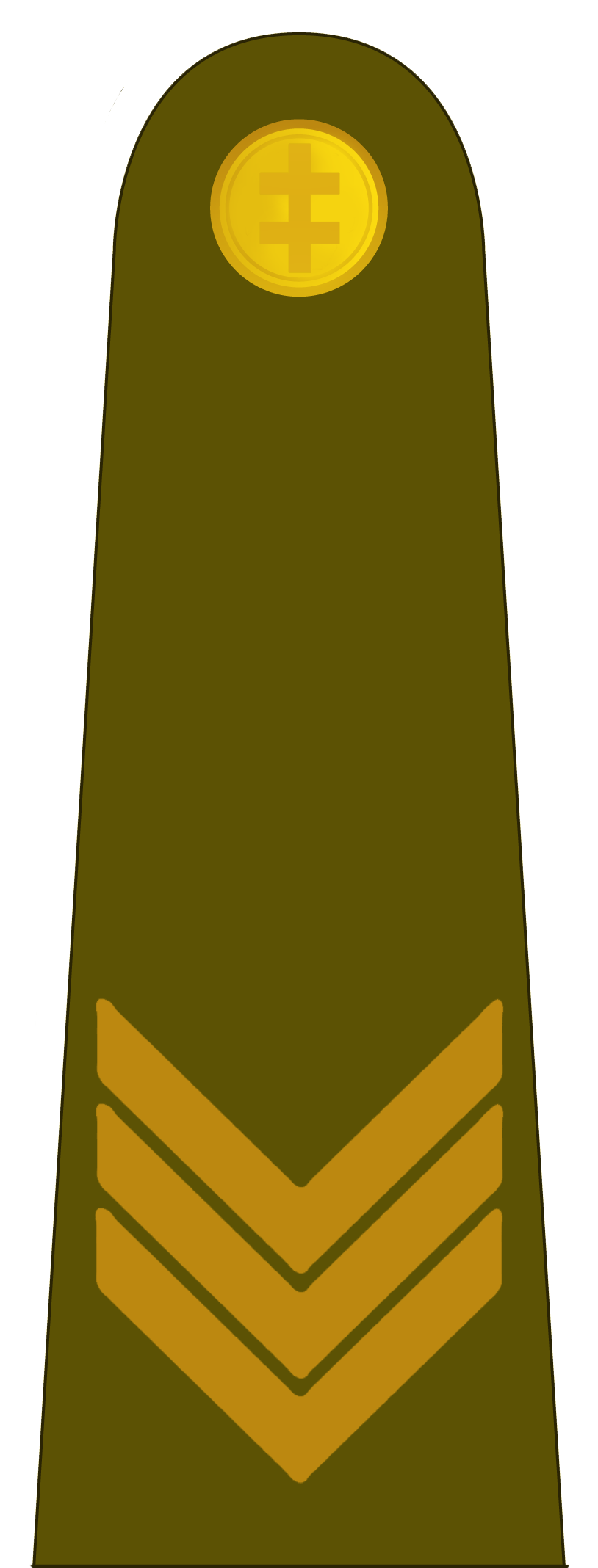
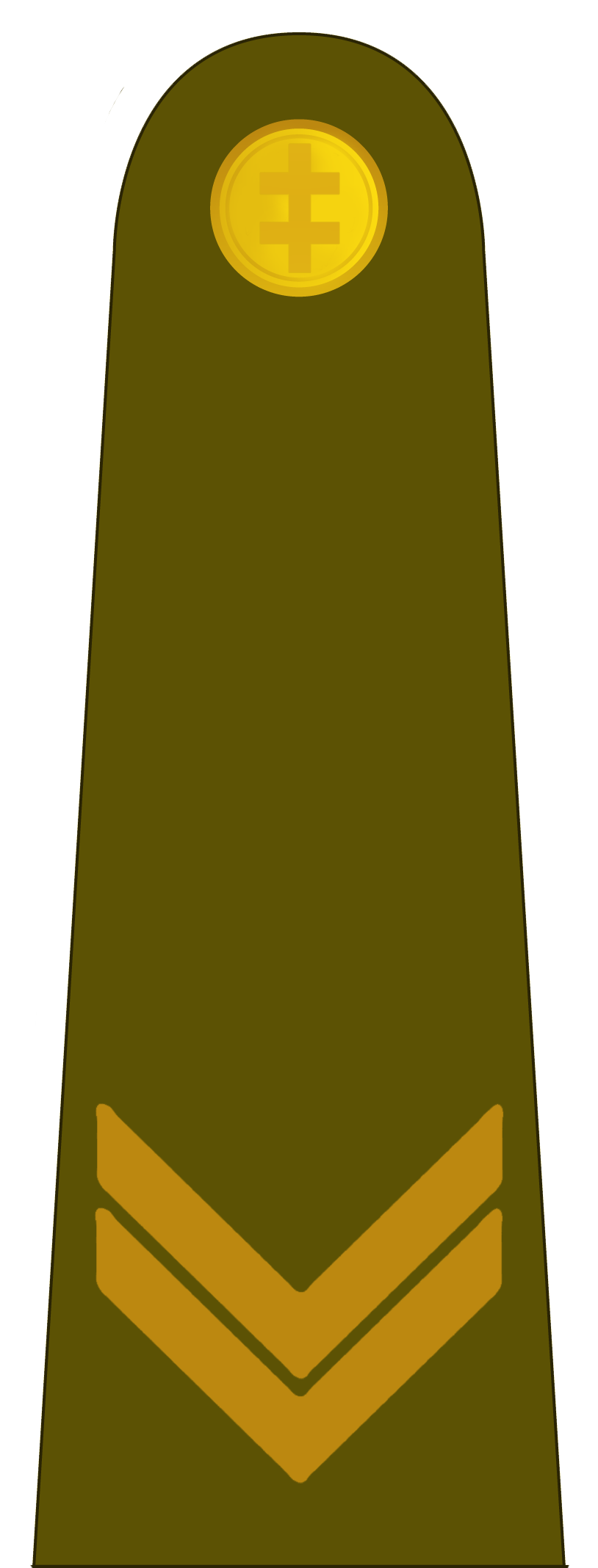
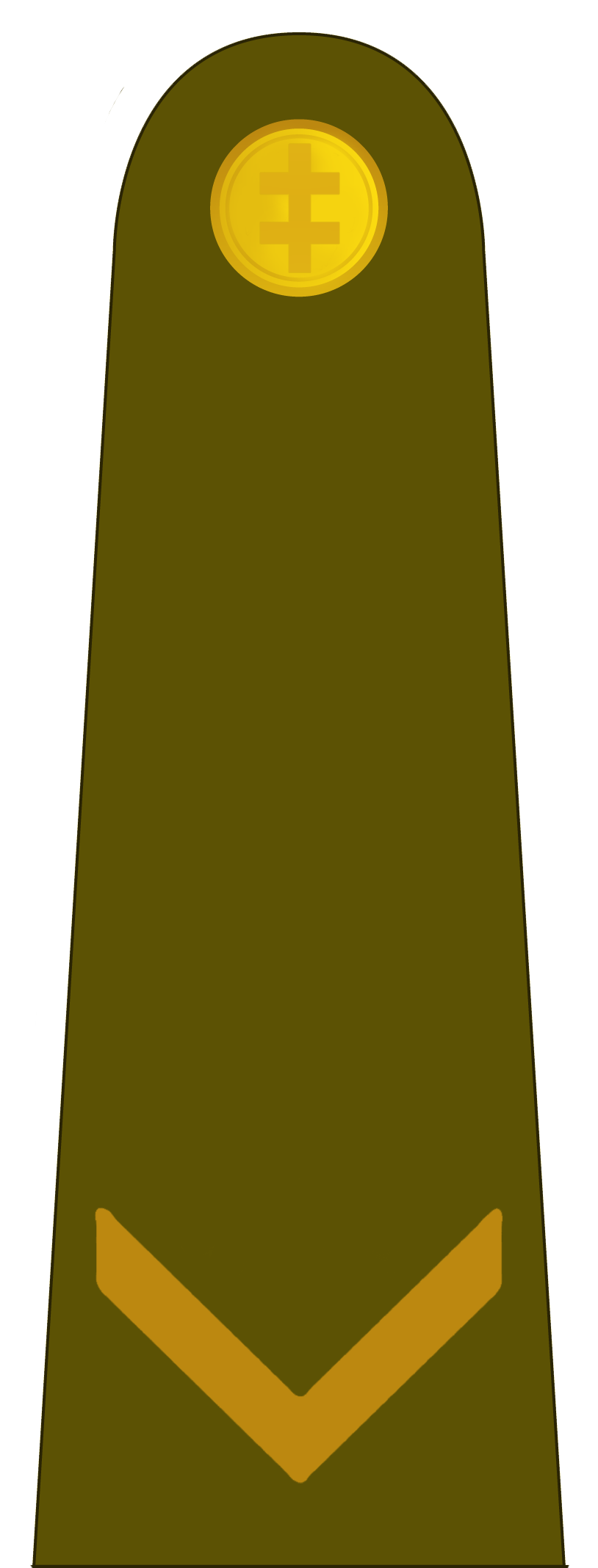
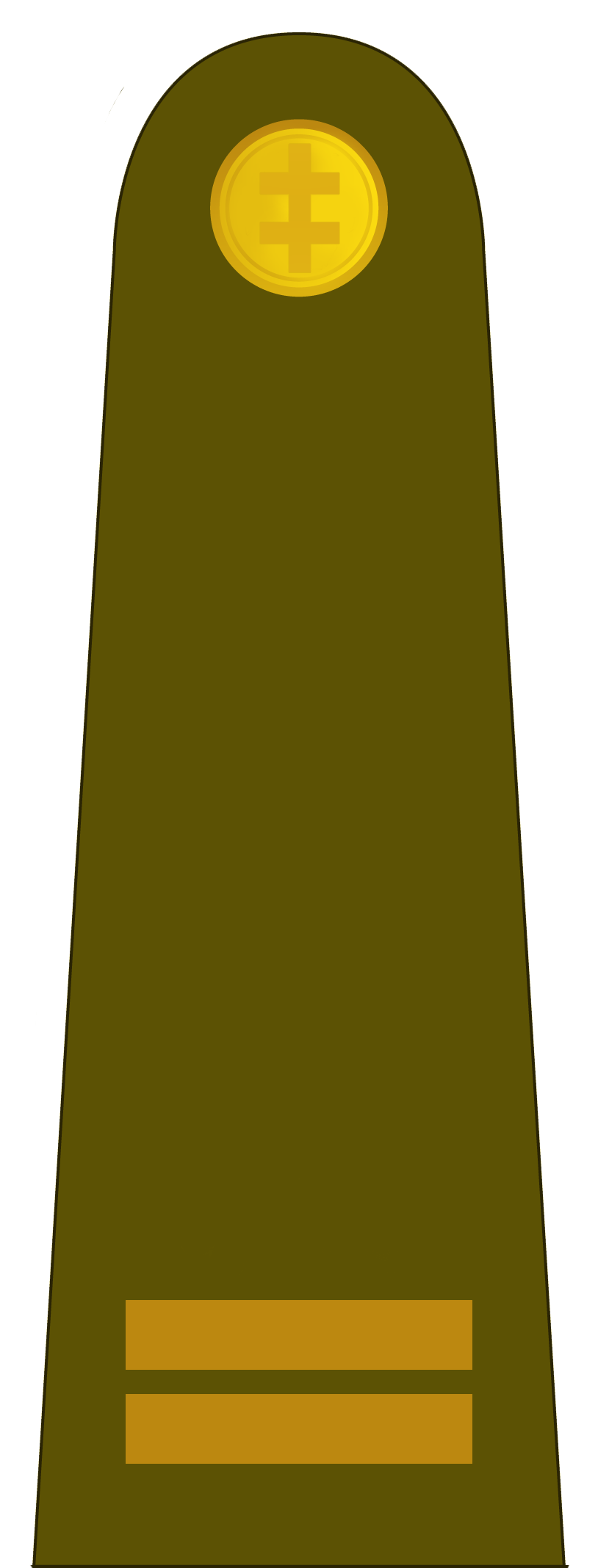
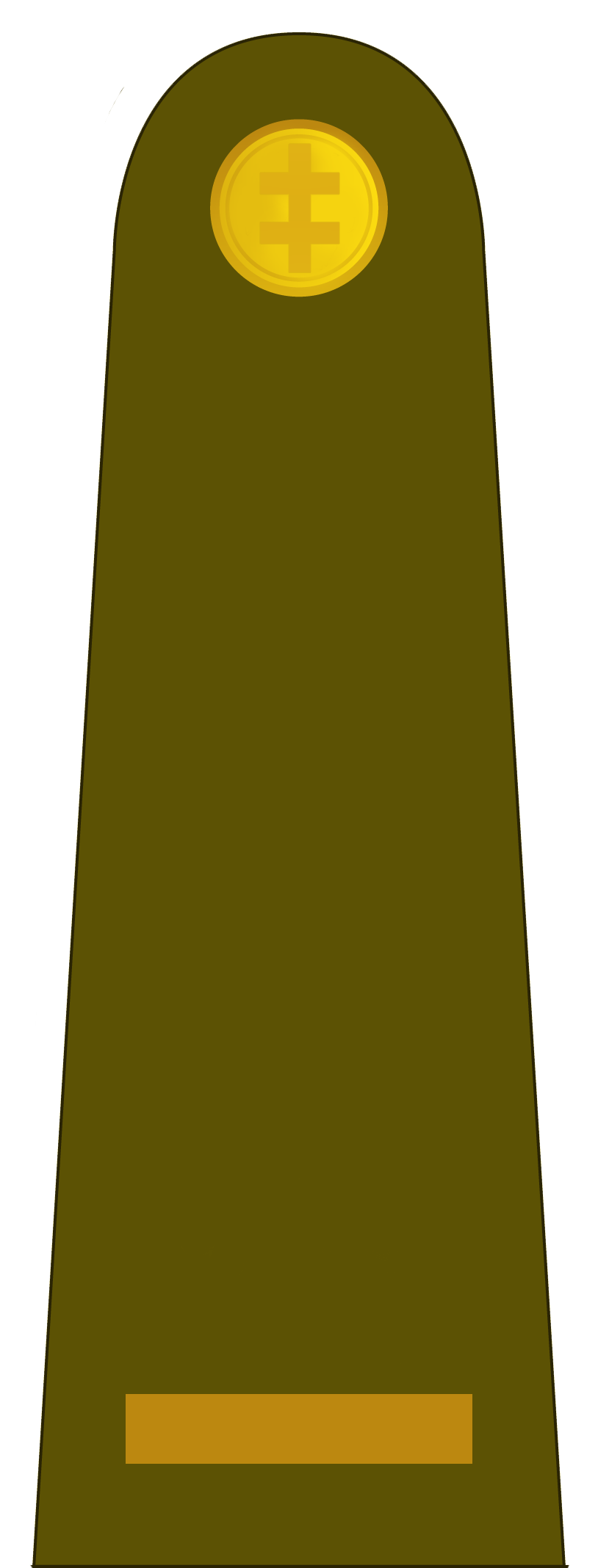
Rank group	NCOs			Other ranks
Lithuanian Riflemen's Union
Lithuanian Riflemen's Union	Rinktinės jaunųjų šaulių vadas	Vyresnysis specialistas	Būrio vado pavaduotojas (Būrininkas)	Skyriaus vadas (Skyrininkas)	Vyriausias šaulys Skyriaus vado pavaduotojas	Eilinis Šaulys

== Symbols ==
From the very beginning, the symbol of the organisation has been a double cross (Vytis cross) on a shield. This is one of the oldest heraldic symbols used in Lithuania. It is also called the Jagiellonian cross because it was used by the Polish King and the Grand Duke of Lithuania Jogaila. During the Lithuanian Wars of Independence Vytis cross became a state military award. The current statute of the LRU states that the symbol of the Union is a golden (yellow) double cross, set in a stylised frame of golden (yellow) oak leaves.

From 1919 to 1940, the riflemen received member badges with numbers. There was also a separate badge for supporters. The badges were worn not only on uniforms but also on civil clothing. The rifleman's badge is a white darkened metal shield, with a contour of a double cross inside. The height of the badge is 47 mm, and the width is 27 mm. The sign is attached by a metal wrench. A miniature of a rifleman's badge is 20 mm high and 12 mm wide.

== See also ==
- Lithuanian National Defence Volunteer Forces
- Lithuanian Territorial Defense Force
- Forest Brothers
- Estonian Defence League
- Aizsargi
- Territorial Defence Force (Poland)
- Territorial Defense Forces (Ukraine)
