= Voskresenskoye, Voskresensky District, Nizhny Novgorod Oblast =

Voskresenskoye Воскресенское
- Work settlement
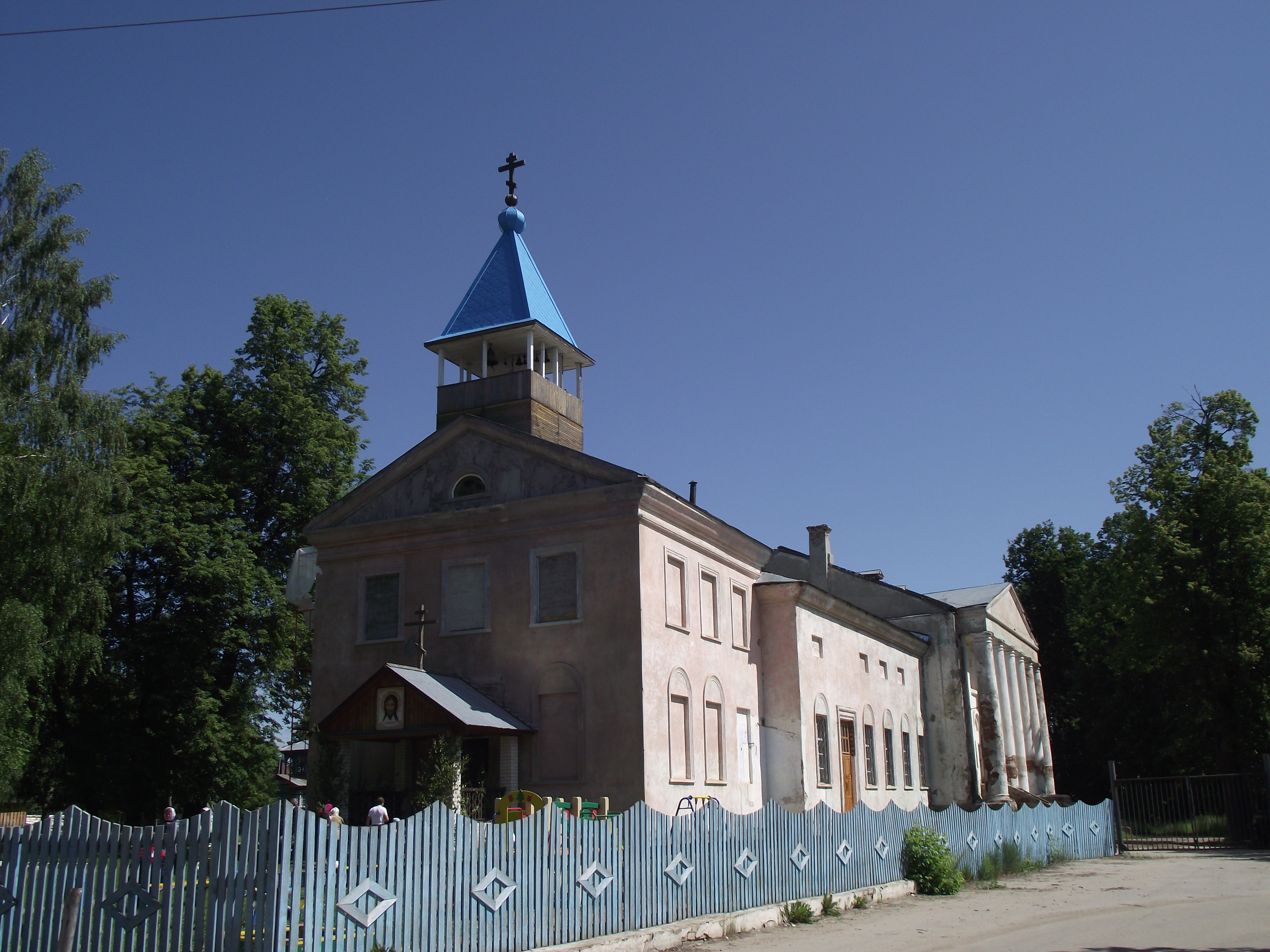
- Interactive map of Voskresenskoye
- Location of Voskresenskoye Voskresenskoye (Nizhny Novgorod Oblast)
- Coordinates: 56°50′N 45°27′E
- Country: Russia
- Federal subject: Nizhny Novgorod Oblast
- Administrative district: Voskresensky District

Population (2010 Census)
  - Total: 6,185
  - Estimate (2025): 5,426 (−12.3%)

Administrative status
  - Capital of: Voskresensky District
- Time zone: UTC+3 (MSK)
- Postal code: 606730
- OKTMO ID: 22622151051

Voskresenskoye (Russian: Воскресе́нское) is an urban locality (a work settlement) and the administrative center of Voskresensky District of Nizhny Novgorod Oblast, Russia, on the Vetluga River. Population: 6,185 (2010 census); 6,362 (2002 census); 6,200 (1989 Soviet census).
