= Šaukėnai =

- Town
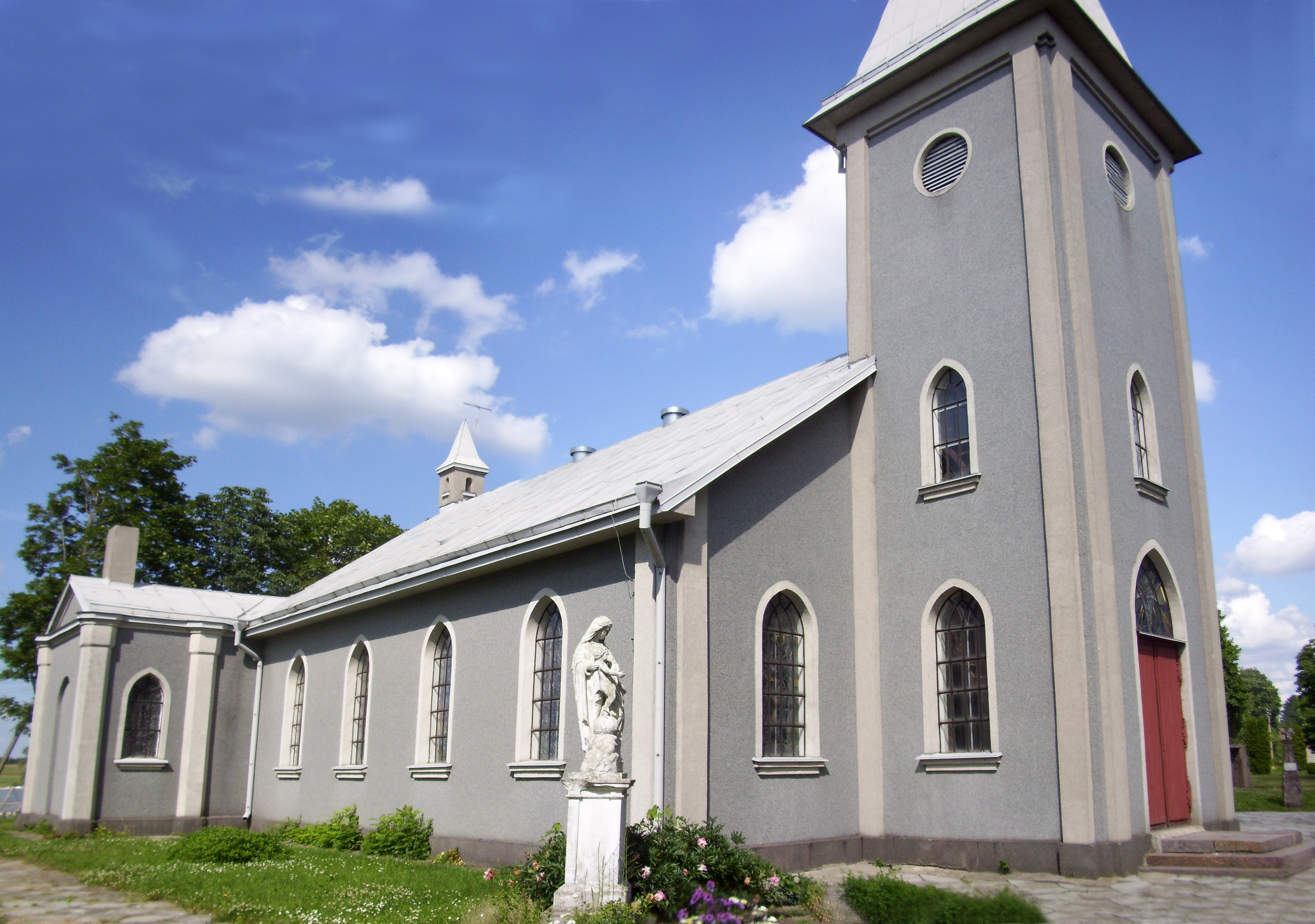

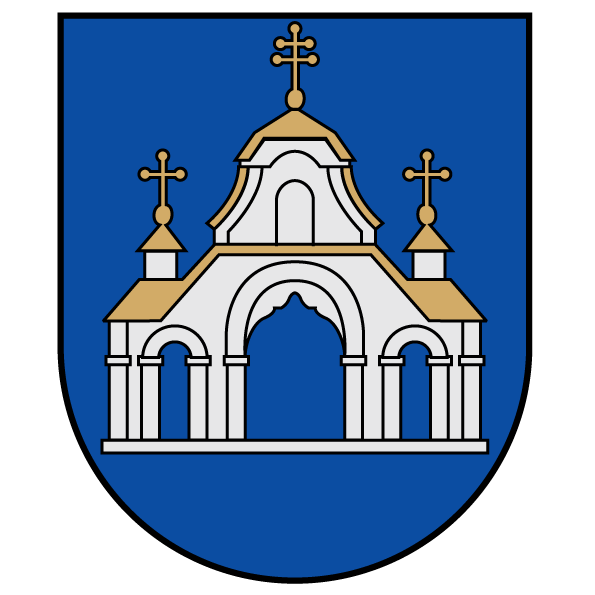
- Coat of arms

- Location in Lithuania
- Coordinates: 55°48′40″N 22°53′0″E
- Country: Lithuania
- Ethnographic region: Samogitia
- County: Šiauliai County

Population (2011)
  - Total: 596
- Time zone: UTC+2 (EET)
  - Summer (DST): UTC+3 (EEST)

Šaukėnai is a village in Šiauliai County in northern-central Lithuania. In 2011 it had a population of 596.

Šaukėnai has Šaukėnų Holy Trinity masonry church (built in 1989), a high school, a library, a post office (ZIP code: 86043), an ethnography museum and Šaukėnai manor with park.

== History ==
On July 31, 1941, 273 to 300 Jews from the village were murdered by an Einsatzgruppen of Germans and Lithuanian nationalists in a mass execution. They were mostly men, the women and children were taken to Žagarė ghetto.
