= Matas Šalčius =

Lithuanian writer (1890–1940)

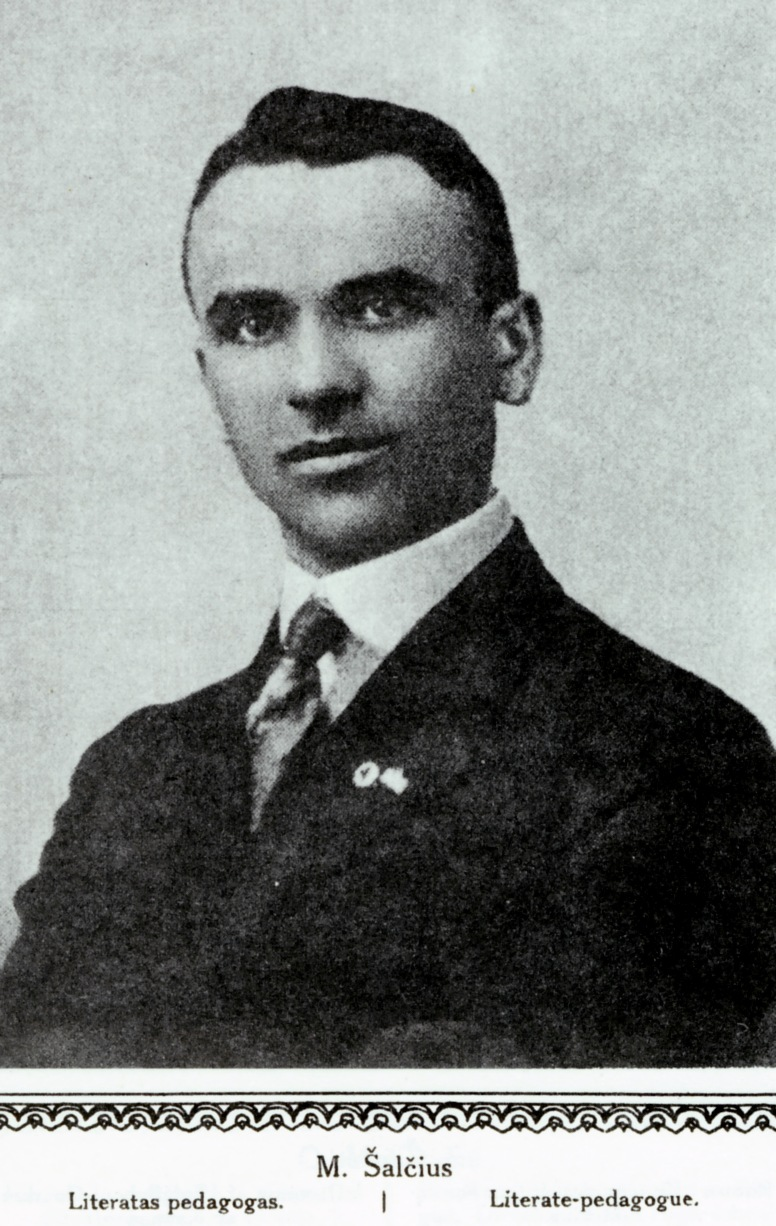
- Born: 20 September 1890; Čiudiškiai, Russian Empire
- Died: 26 May 1940 (aged 49); Guayaramerín, Bolivia
- Monuments: A bas-relief in Guayaramerín
- Citizenship: Lithuanian
- Occupation(s): ELTA director, founder of Lithuanian Riflemen's Union
- Known for: travels, journalistic work
- Notable work: At the company of 40 nations
- Awards: National Press Prize

Matas Šalčius (September 20, 1890 – May 26, 1940) was a Lithuanian traveler, journalist, writer, political figure.

Šalčius was born in the Čiudiškiai village in the modern Prienai district, central Lithuania (at that time part of the Russian Empire). He attended Marijampolė Gymnasium. While studying he began writing articles for newspapers, launching his career in journalism. Šalčius later worked as a teacher in Šilutė district. He was a prominent critic of tsarist Russia so soon he had flee from political persecution. Then Šalčius began his first travels through China, Japan to the United States where he continued his work as a journalist.

After Lithuania gained independence in 1918, Šalčius returned there and worked as a journalist (he was the director of the ELTA news agency). He helped to establish the Lithuanian Riflemen's Union. Šalčius traveled across Europe, and attempted to launch the tourism industry in Lithuania. In 1929, Šalčius, together with another famous Lithuanian traveler, Antanas Poška, began a great journey through the Balkans, Greece, Egypt, Near East to India. After this travel he published the six-volume series Svečiuose pas 40 tautų (At the company of 40 nations), which was awarded the National Press Prize.

In 1936, Šalčius traveled to South America. At first he unsuccessfully attempted to unite Lithuanian diaspora communities in South America. Šalčius planned to journey through all the Americas to Alaska, but he became sick with malaria and encephalitis and died in the town of Guayaramerín, Bolivia. In 2005, an expedition organized by Lithuanian travelers and journalists reached Guayaramerín and marked the approximate location of Šalčius' burial with a bas-relief.
