= Romualdas Budrys =

Lithuanian art historian, museologist (1933–2026)

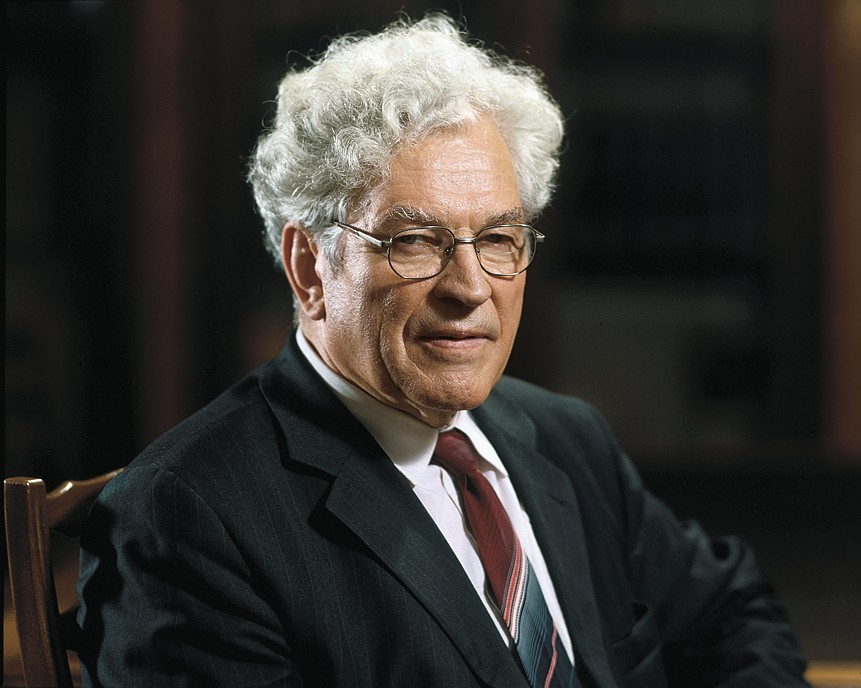
- Born: 26 July 1933; Vertimai, Baisogala Township, Lithuania
- Died: 25 May 2026 (aged 92); Vilnius, Lithuania
- Education: Vilnius Academy of Arts
- Occupations: Museologist, art historian, museum administrator
- Employer: Lithuanian Art Museum
- Known for: Palanga Amber Museum; preservation of the Vilnius Cathedral Treasury; repatriation of Lithuanian art collections
- Title: Director of the Lithuanian Art Museum (1979–2019)

Romualdas Budrys (26 July 1933 – 25 May 2026) was a Lithuanian museologist, art historian, and museum administrator. He served as Director of the Lithuanian Art Museum (now the Lithuanian National Museum of Art) from 1979 to 2019 and was one of the principal architects of the modern Lithuania's museum system in the second half of the twentieth century and the early twenty-first century. He was frequently referred to as the "Patriarch of Lithuanian Museology."

== Early life and education ==
Budrys was born in the village of Vertimai, Baisogala Township, Lithuania, to farmers Kazimieras Budrys and Liucija Budrienė (née Jacevičiūtė). He was the fourth of seven children. His brothers Stasys Budrys [lt] and Algirdas Budrys also became notable figures in the Lithuanian art world.

His family owned a 12-hectare farm. After the Soviet occupation of Lithuania, most of the family's land was confiscated and incorporated into the collective farming system.

Budrys attended secondary school in Baisogala, where he was influenced by ceramic artist and teacher Povilas Krivaitis. He later studied at the Telšiai School of Applied Arts and from 1954 to 1959 attended the State Art Institute of the Lithuanian SSR (now the Vilnius Academy of Arts), graduating with a degree in ceramics. Following graduation, he completed an internship at the State Hermitage Museum in Leningrad (now Saint Petersburg).

== Career ==
Budrys began working at the Lithuanian Art Museum while still a student. He served as a museum guide, conservator-restorer, and later deputy director for Research from 1960 to 1979. In 1979 he was appointed Director of the Lithuanian Art Museum, a position he held until 2019.

Under Budrys's leadership, the museum's holdings grew from approximately 11,000 objects in the late 1950s to more than 253,000 by the end of his tenure in 2019.

During his six decades of museum work, he organized or supervised more than 1,230 national and international exhibitions devoted to Lithuanian and international art, amber and cultural heritage.

Following his retirement, he was granted the honorary title of Museum Emeritus.

== Palanga Amber Museum ==
One of Budrys's most significant achievements was his contribution to the creation and development of the Palanga Amber Museum, housed in the former palace of Count Feliksas Tiškevičius.

Although proposals to establish an amber museum in western Lithuania dated back to the interwar period, the project was ultimately realized through the efforts of Pranas Gudynas, then director of the Lithuanian Art Museum. Working alongside Gudynas and architect Juozas Masalskis, Budrys helped create the museum's first exhibition, which opened in 1963. He subsequently described it as a great piece of good fortune to have worked with Gudynas in bringing the museum into existence.

Budrys later recalled that the museum's beginnings appeared modest, but public interest quickly exceeded expectations. According to his memoirs, long queues formed shortly after the museum opened.

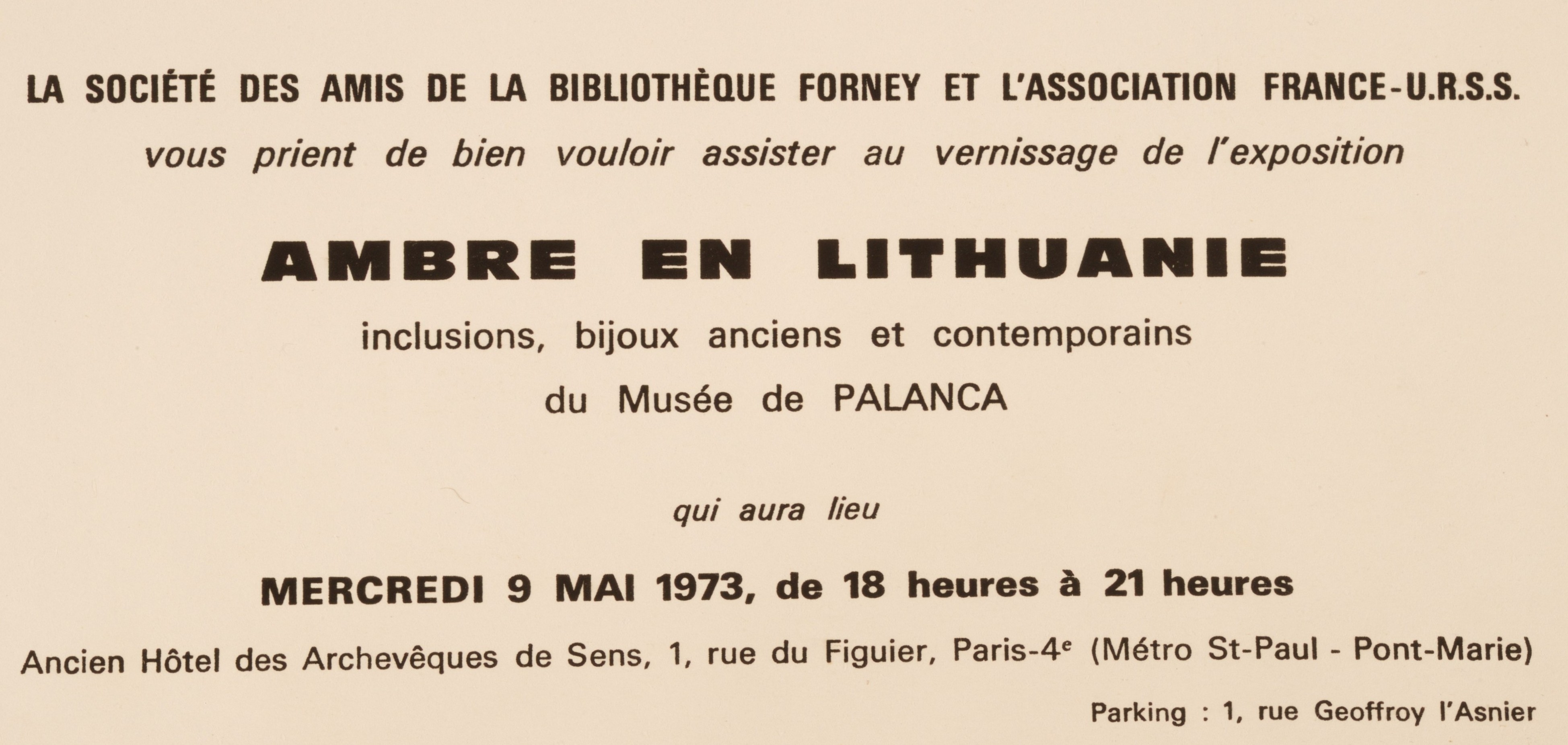
Invitation to the Lithuanian Amber exhibition, Forney Library, Paris, 1973

The museum's success soon attracted the attention of senior Soviet officials from Moscow. On 14 August 1967, during a visit to Palanga, Soviet Premier Alexei Kosygin toured the museum and recorded his impressions in the museum's guest book. He described it as "a remarkable museum established in Lithuania" and suggested that its further expansion and development would be justified. Budrys later viewed this endorsement as an important factor in securing support for the museum's continued growth. He subsequently oversaw several major reorganizations of the museum's permanent displays, culminating in the comprehensive exhibition opened in 1986. Under his leadership, the museum developed into one of Lithuania's most visited and internationally recognized cultural institutions.

Budrys also promoted amber research and organized numerous exhibitions of amber art in Lithuania and abroad, including presentations at international exhibitions such as Expo '92 in Seville.

== Museum development ==
Budrys played a leading role in the establishment, expansion, and modernization of numerous museums, galleries, and cultural heritage institutions throughout Lithuania. Working through the Lithuanian Art Museum, he contributed to the creation or development not only of the Palanga Amber Museum, but also the Pranas Gudynas Restoration and Conservation Center, the Vilnius Picture Gallery, the Museum of Applied Arts, the Radvila Palace Museum, the Juodkrantė Miniatures Museum, the Klaipėda Picture Gallery, the Klaipėda Clock Museum, the National Gallery of Art, and the Vytautas Kasiulis Art Museum.

He also supervised the adaptation of historic buildings for museum use, including Verkiai Palace, the Chodkiewicz Palace, the Old Arsenal, all in Vilnius, and the former Lutheran church in Juodkrantė on the Curonian Spit. In addition, he supported the development of regional museum infrastructure and advised cultural heritage institutions throughout Lithuania.

Through these initiatives, Budrys helped transform the Lithuanian Art Museum from a single institution into a nationwide network of museums, galleries, conservation centers, and exhibition spaces. His work significantly expanded public access to Lithuania's artistic and cultural heritage.

== Preservation of Vilnius Cathedral Treasury ==
Budrys was actively involved in preserving the cultural heritage of Vilnius Cathedral during the Soviet period. His interest in the fate of the Cathedral Treasury began in 1961, when the art historian and museum director Paulius Galaunė encouraged him to investigate the fate and whereabouts of the cathedral's dispersed treasures. Budrys later recalled Galaunė asking him: "Budrys, we should start looking after the treasures of Vilnius Cathedral. What has become of them?" He described these words as sounding "like a charge that would guide the rest of my life."

In subsequent decades, Budrys participated in efforts to protect and conserve the Cathedral Treasury and other important religious and artistic objects. According to contemporary accounts, he was among the museum professionals who helped ensure that significant elements of Lithuania's ecclesiastical heritage remained in Lithuania rather than being transferred to museums elsewhere in the Soviet Union.

Budrys also contributed to the restoration of Vilnius Cathedral and supported preparations for its return to the Catholic Church in the late Soviet period. In 2002, together with Vydas Dolinskas, he co-edited The Treasury of Vilnius Cathedral, a major scholarly publication devoted to the Cathedral Treasury.

== Return of Lithuanian Art Collections ==
One of Budrys's principal achievements was the return of Lithuanian cultural heritage and art collections from abroad.

Between 1979 and 1990, together with colleagues, he organized the transfer of the art collection donated by collector Mykolas Žilinskas from West Germany to Lithuania. These efforts ultimately led to the establishment of the Mykolas Žilinskas Art Gallery in Kaunas.

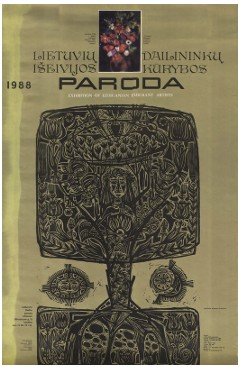
Exhibition of Lithuanian Émigré Art, Vilnius, 1988

In 1988, on the eve of the Lithuanian independence movement, Budrys organized the landmark Exhibition of Lithuanian Émigré Art, bringing together works by 82 Lithuanian artists living abroad. One of the first large-scale presentations of émigré Lithuanian art in Soviet Lithuania, the exhibition helped re-establish cultural ties with the Lithuanian diaspora and paved the way for the return of numerous art collections in the following decades.

Following the restoration of Lithuanian independence in 1990, Budrys coordinated the acquisition and repatriation of major collections created by Lithuanian artists living abroad. Through his efforts, works by Pranas Domšaitis, Vytautas Jonynas, Vytautas Kasiulis, Arbit Blatas, and other émigré artists entered Lithuanian museum collections.

These efforts fundamentally reshaped the representation of Lithuanian émigré art in the country's public museums after 1990.

Budrys also organized the exhibition of major international works in Lithuania, including well known Polish artist Jan Matejko's monumental painting The Battle of Grunwald, which was exhibited in Vilnius in 1999.

== Palace of the Grand Dukes of Lithuania ==
From 2002 to 2008 Budrys chaired the group responsible for preparing the exhibition and interior-design program of the reconstructed Palace of the Grand Dukes of Lithuania in Vilnius. The project formed part of one of the largest cultural heritage initiatives undertaken in Lithuania after the restoration of independence.

== Publications ==
Budrys authored and edited numerous publications devoted to amber, museum studies, art history, and cultural heritage.

His principal works include:

- Gintaras antikiniuose ir ankstyvųjų viduramžių šaltiniuose (Amber in Classical and Early Medieval Sources,1971)
- Gintaras (Amber, 1981)
- Po mūzų šventovės skliautais (Under the Vaults of the Temple of the Muses, with Sigitas Krivickas, 2003)
- The Treasury of Vilnius Cathedral (with Vydas Dolinskas, 2002)

He also published dozens of articles on Lithuanian art, amber studies, museum collections, and heritage preservation.

== Professional and public activities ==
Budrys was a member of the International Council of Museums (ICOM) from 1960. Following Lithuania's restoration of independence, he served three terms as president of the Lithuanian Museums Association.

He was also a member of numerous governmental advisory bodies, expert commissions, and working groups dealing with museum policy, cultural heritage, and the arts.

== Personal life ==
Budrys was married to Marija Budrienė. The couple had two children, a daughter, Rūta, and a son, Eduardas.

Budrys died on 25 May 2026, at the age of 92 and was buried at Rokantiškės Cemetery in Vilnius.

== Awards and honors ==
Following Budrys's death, the National Museum – Palace of the Grand Dukes of Lithuania described him as "an exceptional figure of Lithuanian culture" and "a devoted guardian of heritage."

Budrys received numerous Lithuanian and international distinctions over the course of his career, including honors awarded both during the Soviet period and after the restoration of Lithuanian independence. Among the distinctions received by Budrys were:

- Honored Cultural Worker of the Lithuanian SSR (1983)
- Order of Friendship of Peoples (1986)
- Officer's Cross of the Order of the Lithuanian Grand Duke Gediminas (1995)
- Commander's Cross of the Order of the Lithuanian Grand Duke Gediminas (1999)
- Order Pro augenda concordia (2003)
- Lithuanian Government Prize for Culture and Arts (2006)
- Honorary Citizen of Baisogala (2006)
- Honorary Citizen of Palanga (2009)
- "Carry Your Light and Believe" Cultural Award (2013)
- Honorary Doctorate of the Vilnius Academy of Arts (2013)
- Francysk Skaryna Medal (Belarus, 2014)
- Commander's Cross of the Order of Merit of the Republic of Poland (2019)

== Legacy ==
Budrys is regarded as one of the most influential Lithuanian museum professionals of the twentieth and twenty-first centuries. His work transformed Lithuania's museum landscape, strengthened the preservation of cultural heritage, and facilitated the return of major Lithuanian art collections from abroad.

Owing to his contributions to museum development and heritage preservation, he was frequently referred to as the "Patriarch of Lithuanian Museology."
