= The White Apple Tree =

1932 painting by Antanas Samuolis

White Apple Tree
- Baltoji obelis (Lithuanian)
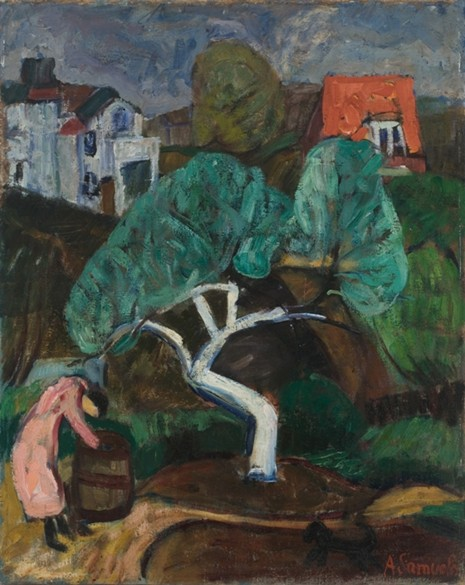
- Artist: Antanas Samuolis
- Year: 1932
- Medium: oil on canvas
- Dimensions: 89 cm × 71 cm (35 in × 28 in)

White Apple Tree (Lithuanian: Baltoji obelis) is a 1932 painting by the Lithuanian artist Antanas Samuolis.

== Description ==
The picture is painted in oil on canvas and has dimensions of 89 x 71 cm.

The painting is part of the collection of the Lithuanian Art Museum in Vilnius.

== Analysis ==
Exhibited for the first time in 1932, White Apple Tree holds a special place in the history of Lithuanian art as part of the best Lithuanian landscapes. Samuolis was young at the time, but still showed maturity in his work. The main focus of the painting is the central apple tree, highlighted by its lighter color. The woman is over a barrel, a dog and several buildings are of secondary importance in the painting. Expressionism is represented by the crooked trunk of the tree, the hunched woman and the uneven plowed farmland. The scene contains a mood of loneliness and sadness. The scenery is authentic, and it is assumed that the whitewashed apple tree is in the family garden of the artist. The painting contains an autobiographical aspect, alluding to the hard life of the artist, suffering from ill health and financial difficulties.

== See also ==
- Tree paint § Description
