= Kaupas =

Kaupas is a surname. Notable people with the surname include:

- Julius Kaupas, (1920–1964), Lithuanian writer
- Maria Kaupas (1880–1940), American religious sister
- Natas Kaupas (born 1969), American skateboarder
- Vytautas Kaupas (born 1982), Lithuanian cyclist
