= The New Settlers =

1933 painting by Antanas Gudaitis

- Naujakuriai (Lithuanian)
- Artist: Antanas Gudaitis
- Year: 1933
- Medium: oil on canvas
- Dimensions: 113 cm × 88 cm (44 in × 35 in)
- Location: Lithuanian Art Museum, Vilnius

The new settlers (Lithuanian: Naujakuriai) is a painting by Lithuanian artist Antanas Gudaitis of 1933.

== Description ==
The picture is painted in oil on canvas and has dimensions of 113 x 88 cm.

The picture is part of the collection of the Lithuanian Art Museum in Vilnius.

== Analysis ==
The artist brought expressionist painting to Lithuania in the second half of 1933, when he returned to after studying for four years in Paris. The mood and the depiction of the subjects is reminiscent of the musicians and circus performers in Paris, although it does not represent the joie de vivre of the young couple but rather their concerns and their problems. The same opposition appears in the gay combination of colors—a boldly painted goat in blue, and the cow in red—paired with its depiction of young parents burdened by the need to work, and the social problems of the time, as reflected both in literature and in other art.
