= Scene of a Lithuanian Village =

1918 painting by Pranas Domšaitis

- Lietuvos kaimo peizažas (Lithuanian)
- Artist: Pranas Domšaitis
- Year: 1918
- Medium: oil on canvas
- Dimensions: 65 cm × 65 cm (26 in × 26 in)
- Location: Lithuanian Art Museum; Vilnius

Scene of a Lithuanian Village (Lithuanian: Lietuvos kaimo peizažas) is a painting of Lithuanian artist Pranas Domšaitis of 1918.

== Description ==
The picture is painted in oil on canvas and has dimensions of 65 x 65 cm. It is part of the collection of the Lithuanian Art Museum in Vilnius.

== Analysis ==
Pranas Domšaitis is one of the most famous Lithuanian artists and one of the most significant Lithuanian expressionists. He graduated from the Royal Academy of Fine Arts in Königsberg. After World War I is well known in Germany and after World War II - in South Africa. Influenced of artistic trends of the early 20th century. He participated in several exhibitions and maintains contacts with many famous artists in most Western European centers of art. Absorbs international influences, but while maintaining national identity.

The Scene of Lithuanian village picture from the mature period of Domšaitis that began after World War II. Dramatic mood of the picture due to the impact of war and the terrible fate of homeless refugees. Cold moonlight highlights the ominous clouds. Mystery is underlined by a rich palette of colors and generalized forms.
