= Julius Kaupas =

Lithuanian writer (1920–1964)

- Born: Julius Viktoras Kaupas; 6 March 1920; Kaunas, Lithuania
- Died: 1 March 1964 (aged 43); Chicago, United States
- Resting place: Detroit
- Education: Vytautas Magnus University; University of Tübingen; University of Freiburg
- Occupations: Writer; psychiatrist
- Spouse: Dalia Kaupienė née Galaunytė
- Writing career
- Years active: 1942–1964
- Genres: Magical realism, neo-romanticism
- Notable work: Daktaras Kripštukas pragare (1948)

Julius Viktoras Kaupas (also known by the pen name Coppelius; 6 March 1920 – 1 March 1964) was a Lithuanian émigré writer and psychiatrist.

== Biography ==
=== Early life ===
Julius Viktoras Kaupas was born on 6 March 1920 in Kaunas. His father, Julius Kaupas, was a financier and member of the Constituent Assembly of Lithuania. The Kaupas household contained many books, and the children were encouraged to read. From 1929 to 1938, Kaupas attended the prestigious Kaunas Jesuit Gymnasium. During his school years, Kaupas organized a small student literary society and illustrated small comic strips. Kaupas also became life-long friends with Antanas Škėma after meeting him in the school theater. He also briefly participated in the Lithuanian scout and ateitininkai movements. After graduating, Kaupas enrolled in the War School of Kaunas. After one year of mandatory service, he achieved the rank of reserve junior lieutenant. To relieve boredom and the strictness of the school, Kaupas played chess on weekends and often won in championships. Kaupas was said to have an excellent memory, and would take breaks from work by solving chess puzzles in his head from memory.

=== Studies in Lithuania ===
After graduating from the War School of Kaunas in 1939, Kaupas enrolled at the faculty of medicine at the Vytautas Magnus University. Although a medicine student, Kaupas often visited the faculty of history and theology, becoming fascinated with the existentialist ideas. Here he met contemporaries such as Juozas Girnius, Henrikas Nagys, Alfonsas Nyka-Niliūnas, and participated in literary student evenings. Kaupas's literary debut was in the Žiburėlis magazine in 1942. He was awarded his first prize in 1943 by the magazine Savaitė for the novella Banknotas. Kaupas continued publishing short stories in the magazine until his graduation in 1944, after which he emigrated to Germany, fleeing the nearing Eastern Front.

=== Studies in Germany ===
At first, Kaupas reached Vienna by train, later working as an ambulance doctor in Zistersdorf. As evident by letters sent to Nyka-Niliūnas, Kaupas experienced an existential crisis at this time. According to Kaupas's primary biographer, surviving an absurd world required a sense of humor, which was translated into a literary element. On 13 January 1945, Kaupas married Dalia nee Galaunytė. He was also visiting Bartenstein, but had to flee to Denmark after almost being captured by Soviet troops. He settled in Tübingen in March 1945. Beginning in 1946, there he studied medicine at the University of Tübingen, defending his thesis on pharmacology in the same year. Kaupas and his wife were one of the founders of the liberal, humanist Šviesa organization, established as a counter to the ateitininkai movement. He edited the organization's magazine of the same name, and co-edited the Aidai, Literatūros lankai, and Matmenys magazines.

In 1947 Kaupas moved to Freiburg, where he began attending Vytautas Kazimieras Jonynas's art school. Kaupas especially enjoyed local impressionist art exhibits and Lithuanian artists such as Kajetonas Sklėrius, Vytautas Kariukštis, Alfonsas Krivickas, and Vytautas Kasiulis. Kaupas also studied philosophy and literature at the University of Freiburg. In 1948, Kaupas released his first novel entitled Daktaras Kripštukas pragare (lit. 'Doctor Kripštukas in Hell'). For this collection of stories, Kaupas was awarded the literature prize by the Lithuanian Red Cross. The story was well received in the press.

=== Emigration to the United States ===
Kaupas and his wife emigrated to the United States, reaching New York on 18 February 1950. After a few days, they traveled to Chicago. Kaupas was employed as an intern doctor in Loretto Hospital. He then got a job as a psychiatrist in Alton, Illinois, where he lectured on neurology. Kaupas continued to be a psychiatrist at the Eloise Psychiatric Hospital in 1953. Despite being sick with diabetes, in 1955 Kaupas was mobilized to the United States Army's medic corps in Valley Forge, Pennsylvania. After completing mandatory service, Kaupas first received the rank of major, and returned to psychiatrist work. Kaupas suddenly died of diabetes on 1 March 1964. He was buried in Detroit on 4 March.

== Literary work ==
Kaupas was the author of numerous essays and articles which were marked by ironic criticism of literature. Stories written while Kaupas was a student are marked by magical realism and children's themes. The majority of Kaupas's novellas take place in a fantasized Kaunas, Lithuania, and are marked by psychological insight and idealism. Artistically, Kaupas's works are marked by aesthetic literary realism, and expressionism. Daktaras Kripštukas pragare (which was released in Soviet Lithuania only in 1984) also had elements of neo-romanticism. Generally, Kaupas's works examine the problems of human existence, and are marked by irony and modernity.

Kaupas is considered the progenitor of urban stories in Lithuanian literature. Often, the main characters of Kaupas's novels are nonconformist dreamers or strangers apt to melancholy. Outbreaks of divine existence, which give meaning to the characters' lives, are central to his novels. Believing that art "transcended reality", Kaupas belonged to a generation of literary critics dubbed the lankininkai, after their magazine Literatūros lankai. His prose is described as cleansing the Lithuanian tradition of poetic speech and turning it into a direction of universality and playfulness which does not seek ideological arguments to strengthen the nation's existence.
