= Lithuanian Girl with Palm Sunday Fronds =

1844 painting by Kanuty Rusiecki

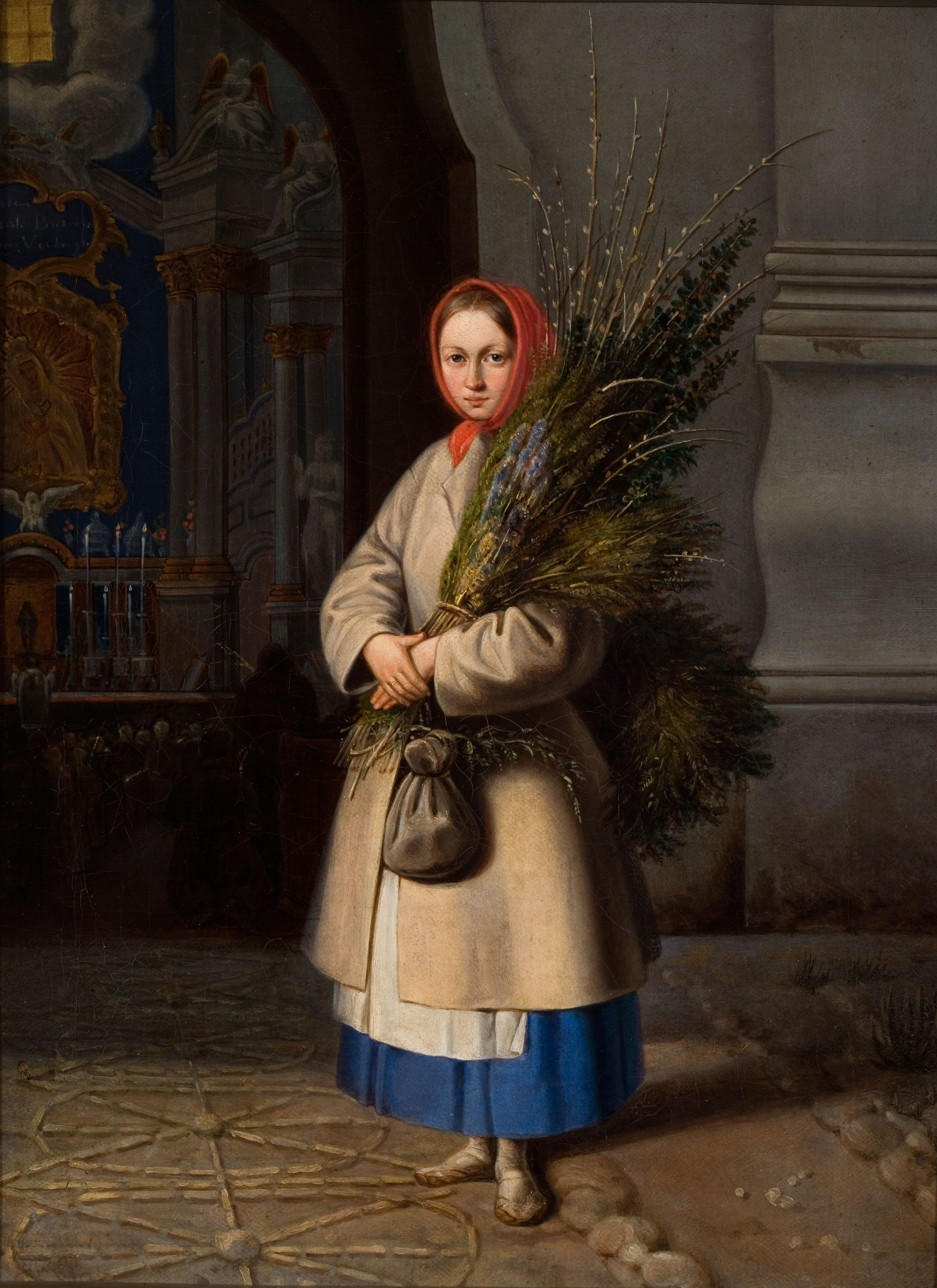
- Artist: Kanuty Rusiecki
- Year: 1844
- Medium: Oil on canvas
- Dimensions: 45 cm × 34 cm (18 in × 13 in)
- Location: Lithuanian Art Museum, Vilnius

Lithuanian Girl with Palm Sunday Fronds is an 1844 oil on canvas painting by the Polish-Lithuanian artist Kanuty Rusiecki in the Lithuanian Art Museum.

This painting shows a girl holding grasses and willow fronds (known as Easter palm) on Palm Sunday. She is standing in front of a Baroque church and wearing a traditional dress, and in the background there is a Rococo altar featuring an image of Our Lady of the Gate of Dawn. Rusiecki was at the peak of his fame in Vilnius when he painted this picture. He specialized in portraits but is also known for genre works that placed the local heritage in a majestic setting. This painting became so popular that it is considered today a symbol of the Lithuanian 19th-century Romantic movement.

The painting is similar to Rusiecki's earlier work, but less obviously symbolic:

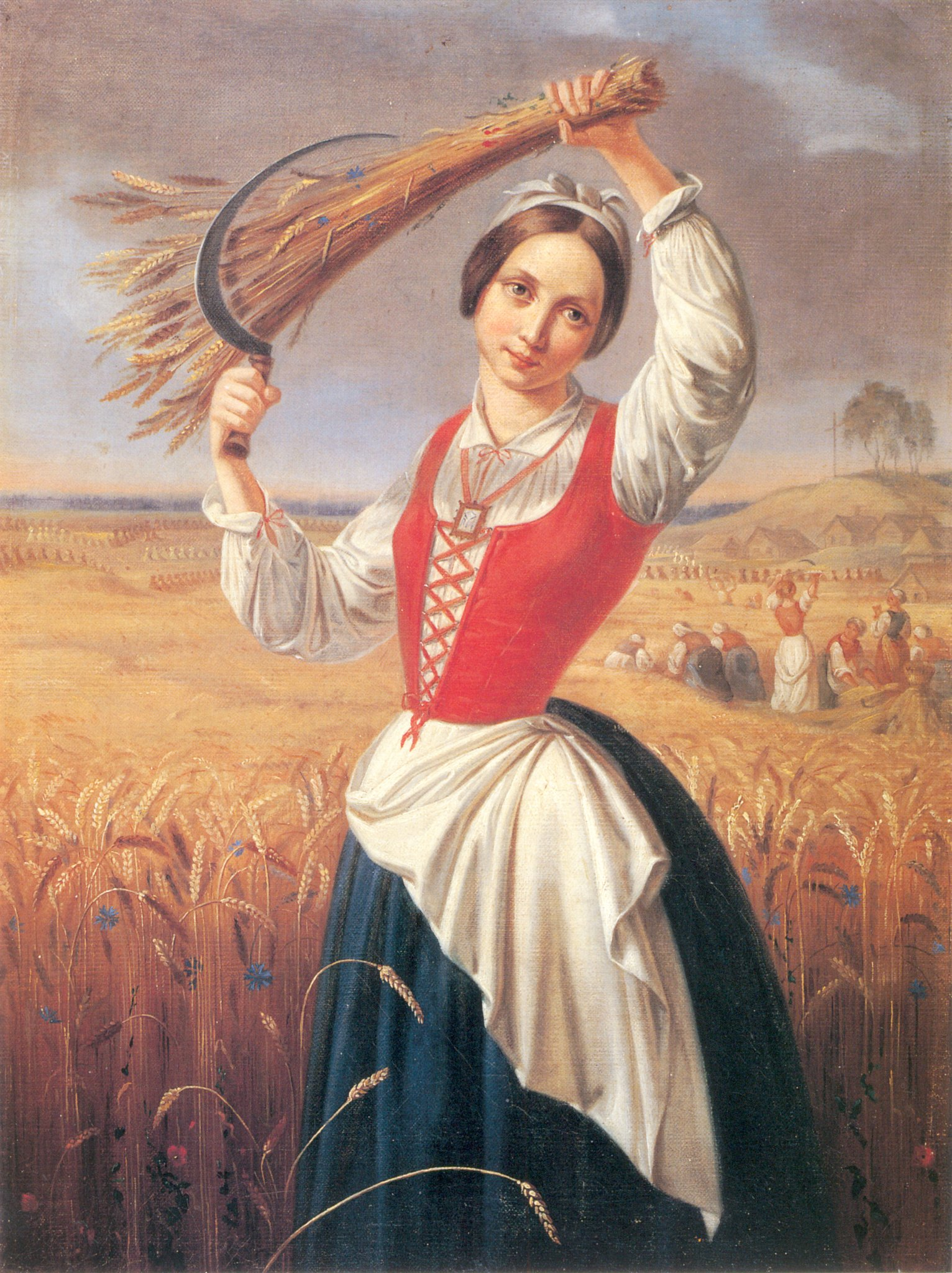
A Woman Harvesting, 1844
