= Woman with the Artist =

1948 painting by Vytautas Kasiulis

Woman with the artist
- Moteris pas dailininką (Lithuanian)
- Artist: Vytautas Kasiulis
- Year: 1948
- Medium: Oil on canvas
- Dimensions: 100 cm × 96 cm (39 in × 38 in)
- Location: Lithuanian Art Museum; Vilnius

Woman with the artist (Lithuanian: Moteris pas dailininką) is a painting by the Lithuanian artist Vytautas Kasiulis from 1948.

== Description ==
The picture is painted with oil paints and has dimensions of 100 x 96 centimeters.

The picture is part of the collection of the Lithuanian Art Museum in Vilnius.

== Analysis ==
Vytautas Kasyulis is one of the few Lithuanian artists with an international reputation. In 1944, he moved to Austria and Germany. He taught at the School of Arts and Crafts (Werkkunstschule) in Freiburg. In 1948 he settled in France. In the painting Woman with the artist, he skillfully creates shading, a sophisticated harmony of colors, and the relaxed atmosphere in the room. The work exudes decorative flair, loss of viability, smooth contours of objects, and a fondness for bright, warm colors. His works re-create daily life, balanced between fantasy and reality. The theme of the woman is one of the most delicate topics that reflected in all his work.
