= Fritz Ascher =

German painter

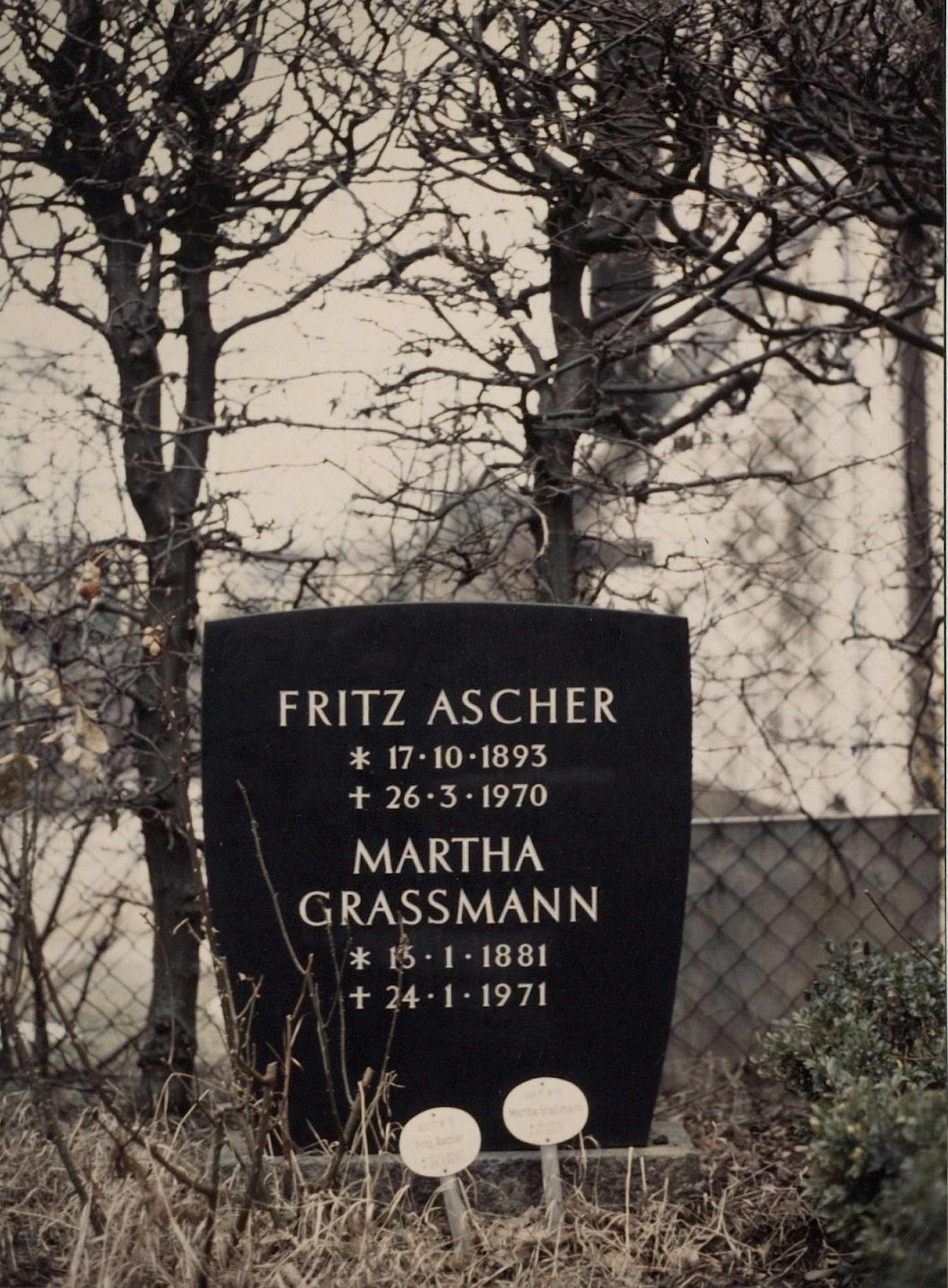
- Alter Friedhof Berlin-Wannsee, Friedenstraße 8, Fritz Ascher und Martha Graßmann, Part 11 W No 15, Photo 1990 ©Rachel Stern
- Born: 17 October 1893; Berlin, Germany
- Died: 26 March 1970 (aged 76); Berlin, Germany
- Education: Max Liebermann; Lovis Corinth; Kunstakademie Königsberg
- Known for: Painting, Drawing, Printmaking
- Notable work: Golem, Golgotha, Bajazzo, Beethoven, The Tortured
- Movement: Expressionist

Fritz Ascher (17 October 1893 – 26 March 1970) was a German artist, whose work is characterized by Expressionist and Symbolist sensitivity. In paintings, works on paper and poetry he explored existential questions and themes of contemporary social and cultural relevance, of spirituality and mythology. Ascher's expressive strokes and intense colors create emotionally intense and authentic work.

== Early life and work ==
Fritz Ascher was born in Berlin, on 17 October 1893, the son of the dental surgeon and businessman Dr. Hugo Ascher (1859–1922) and Minna Luise Ascher (born Schneider; 1867–1938). His sisters Charlotte Hedwig and Margarete Lilly (Grete) were born 8 October 1894 and 11 June 1897. Hugo Ascher converted his three children to Protestantism in 1901, his wife remained Jewish. Hugo Ascher's business was successful, and in 1909 the family moved into a villa in Niklasstraße 21–23 in Berlin-Zehlendorf, built by the prominent architect Professor Paul Schultze-Naumburg.

At the age of 16 he studied with Max Liebermann, who gave him the "Künstlereinjährige," an art diploma, and recommended him to the art academy Königsberg. There, dean Ludwig Dettmann, co-founder of the Berlin Secession, had hired dynamic teachers who emphasized the value of a solid, practical education. Among others, the artist befriended Eduard Bischoff, who painted a portrait of him in 1912.

Back in Berlin around 1913, Ascher studied in the painting schools of Lovis Corinth, Adolf Meyer and Curt Agthe. He was active in the networks of the Berlin avant-garde, and knew many artists personally. Influenced by Expressionist artists such as the older Edvard Munch, Emil Nolde and Wassily Kandinsky, and his contemporaries Max Beckmann, Georges Rouault and Ludwig Meidner, Ascher found his very own artistic language. He traveled extensively and started exhibiting his work. In 1914, Ascher and his friend and fellow painter Franz Domscheit (Pranas Domšaitis) presumably traveled to Norway and met Edvard Munch in Oslo. During a longer stay in Bavaria and Munich in 1919 Domscheit (Pranas Domšaitis) drew into Aschers sketchbook and Ascher drew a portrait of his friend. Ascher met the artists of the Blue Rider and befriended the artists of the satirical German weekly magazine Simplicissimus, among them Gustav Meyrink, Alfred Kubin, George Grosz and Käthe Kollwitz.

Ascher's expressive strokes and intense colors with descriptive outlines and areal color combine elements of Expressionism with those of Symbolism. His early work is very multifaceted in themes, the techniques used and the style of painting. The result is a fascinating field of tension between small intimate graphite drawings and large-format polychrome figural compositions, between portraits and biblical scenes, character and milieu studies or between representations of literary and allegorical figures. At the same time, he responded to contemporary themes, such as the street fights of the November Revolution of 1918.

The artist now created some of his most important work, among them "Lone Man" ("Der Vereinsamte") from c. 1914, his very new interpretation of the crucifixion, "Golgotha" (1915), the Jewish myth "Golem" (1916), his "Bajazzo and Artists" ("Bajazzo und Artisten") from 1916/1945, and his powerful portrait of the composer Ludwig van Beethoven (1924/1945).

== 1933–1945 ==
On 30 January 1933 Hitler assumed power. As Modern painter and Jewish-born, Ascher could no longer produce, exhibit, or sell his art. He hid among friends in Berlin and Potsdam, constantly changing his residence. During the Pogroms on 9–10 November 1938, Ascher was arrested and interned in the Sachsenhausen concentration camp and the Potsdam Gestapo prison. Released six months later, he survived the Nazi terror regime hiding in a cellar of a partially bombed-out building in the wealthy Grunewald neighborhood in Berlin. During this time he wrote poems about love and the divine, and tributes to his artistic role models. In other poems, he turned to a new theme: they evoke nature as a place of refuge and a spiritual home. These poems give a glimpse into the artist's innermost feelings and can be understood as "unpainted paintings." The war was almost over when on 25 April 1945 bombs destroyed most of the artwork that Ascher had left with friends.

== Late work ==
After Hitler's defeat, Ascher continued to live in Berlin Grunewald, with Martha Graßmann, who hid him 1942–1945, at Bismarckallee 26. Withdrawn from society, he threw himself into his work. Karl Ellwanger remembered, "When he worked, he seemed to be in a trance, he was almost not there. My presence did not disturb his work. He would walk the length of the room, adding a brushstroke and then walking back, a constant back and forth – it was impossible to follow him." His studio was a large semi-circle room with adjoining winter garden. During the winter, when the studio could not be heated, Ascher created works on paper: ink drawings, watercolors and gouaches. 1952/53 he had a phase of most intense work. Again and again phases of tremendous creative productivity were interrupted by times of depression.

Initially he painted over some of his early work, but soon he focused mainly on landscapes, only sometimes drawing people from memory. Living close to the Grunewald, Berlin's expansive city forest, the artist observed and painted nature in different light, at different day-times and seasons, which he re-created in his studio. He painted powerful images of trees and meadows, sunrises and sunsets, all devoid of human presence, in which sun and light are a dominant force. With these paintings, Ascher continued the intense contact with nature begun in his poems.

Ascher worked with renewed immediacy and urgency, dramatically simplifying forms and medium. His thick, bright pigments suggest both vibrant, life-affirming joy and, in the rough-hewn nature of his brushstrokes, a dark, inner anguish transformed into light. The emotional narratives of his early work were replaced by economical landscape images and stylized flowers and trees, single-mindedly repeated at an intimate scale. Near-obsession combined with close observation and an appreciation of nuance. Especially the trees, singly or in rows, in groups of two or three, became standing figures that confront us, each as unmistakable as each individual.

Fritz Ascher died on 26 March 1970, in Berlin.

== Legacy ==
During his lifetime, Ascher enjoyed only one large retrospective exhibition, which opened at Berlin's Rudolf Springer Gallery in 1969, a few months before his death. Since 2016, exhibitions and publications are introducing the artist to the public. On 21 February 2018 a Stolperstein (stumbling block) for Fritz Ascher was placed at Niklasstrasse 21–23 in Berlin-Zehlendorf.

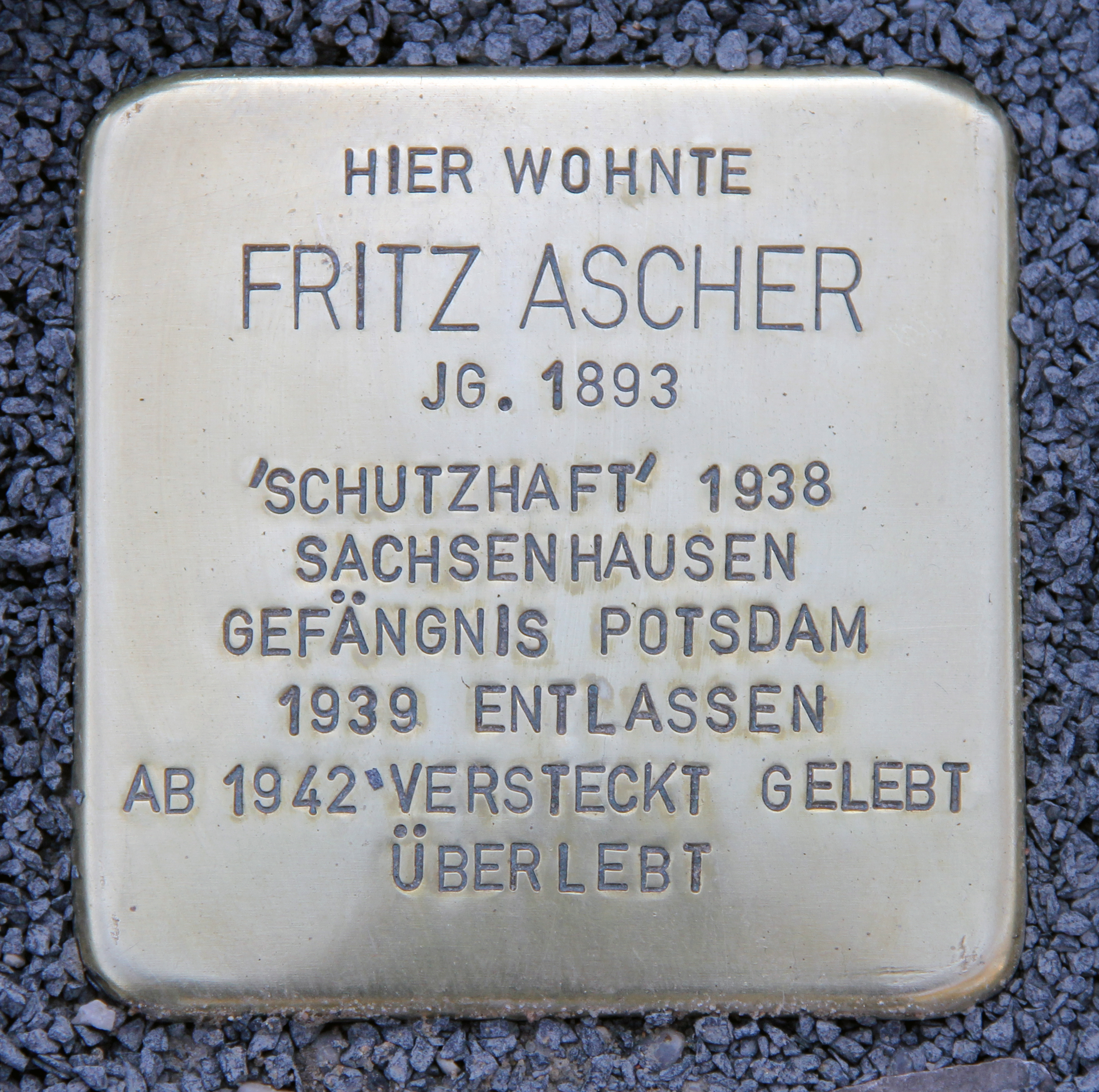
Stolperstein Niklasstr 21 (Zehld) Fritz Ascher

== Exhibitions ==
Fritz Ascher was a member of the Berufsverband Bildender Künstler Berlins (1946–1970).

- 2024 - "Liebe und Verrat. Der Expressionist Fritz Ascher aus New Yorker Privatsammlungen". Curators: Jutta Götzmann and Rachel Stern. Haus der Graphischen Sammlung im Augustinermuseum Freiburg, 8 November 2024 - 2 March 2025.
- 2022 – "Identity, Art and Migration. Seven Artists persecuted by German Nazis 1933-1945". Curators: Ori Z Soltes and Rachel Stern. Online exhibition https://migration.fritzaschersociety.org, 27 February 2022 – 27 February 2027
- 2021 – "Fritz Ascher: Themes and Variations. A Digital Exhibition Experience." Curator Elizabeth Berkowitz. Online exhibition https://fritzaschersociety.org/exhibition-event/fritz-ascher-themes-and-variations-a-digifas-digital-exhibition-experience/, 30 September 2021 – 30 September 2024
- 2020 – "Der Vereinsamte. Propheten und Clowns in der Kunst Fritz Aschers (1893–1970)." / "The Loner. Prophets and Clowns in Fritz Ascher’s Art (1893–1970)". Forum Jacob Pins, Höxter, 6 September – 29 November
- 2020 – "Fritz Ascher, Expressionist." Joel and Lila Harnett Museum of Art, University of Richmond, Richmond (VA), 16 January – 24 May
- 2019 – "Im Reich der Nummern. Wo die Männer keine Namen haben./In the Country of Numbers. Where the Men have no Names". Gedenkstätte und Museum Sachsenhausen, Sachsenhausen, 29 January – 31 July
- 2019 – "Fritz Ascher, Expressionist." Grey Art Gallery, New York University, New York, 9 January – 6 April
- 2018–19 – "Umkämpfte Wege der Moderne. Wilhelm Schmid und die Novembergruppe." Potsdam Museum – Forum für Kunst und Geschichte, Potsdam, 29 September 2018 – 27 January 2019
- 2017–18 – "Sechs Wochen sind fast wie lebenslänglich..." Das Potsdamer Polizeigefängnis Priesterstrasse/Bauhofstrasse / "Six weeks is almost like a life sentence..." The Potsdam police prison in Priesterstrasse/Bauhofstrasse. Stiftung Gedenkstätte Lindenstrasse, Potsdam, 12 December 2017 – 29 April 2018
- 2017 – "Beauteous Strivings: Fritz Ascher, Works on Paper." Curated by Karen Wilkin. New York Studio School, New York, 26 October – 3 December 2017
- 2017 – "Hauptstadtfussball". Stadtmuseum Berlin – Ephraim Palais, Berlin, 26 July 2017 – 7 January 2018
- 2016–18 – "Leben ist Glühn. Der Expressionist Fritz Ascher"/"To Live is to Glow with Passion. The Expressionist Fritz Ascher". Felix-Nussbaum-Haus, Osnabrück, 25 September 2016 – 15 January 2017; Kunstsammlungen Chemnitz – MUSEUM GUNZENHAUSER, Chemnitz, 4 March – 18 June 2017; Museum Charlottenburg-Wilmersdorf in der Villa Oppenheim, Berlin, 8 December 2017 – 11 March 2018; Potsdam Museum – Forum für Kunst und Geschichte, Potsdam, 10 December 2017 – 11 March 2018; Museum Schlösschen im Hofgarten, Wertheim, 13 May – 10 September 2018; Kallmann-Museum-Museum, Ismaning, 30 September – 25 November 2018
- 2016/17 – "Golem – Die Legende vom Menschen", Jüdisches Museum, Berlin, 23 September 2016 – 29 January 2017
- 2015–16 – "Verfahren. "Wiedergutmachung" im geteilten Berlin" ("Making Amends" Compensation and Restitution Cases in Divided Berlin), Aktives Museum, Berlin, 9 October 2015 – 14 January 2016; Landgericht Berlin/Amtsgericht Mitte, Berlin, 29 September – 18 November 2016
- 2014 – "Zeitenwende 1914. Fritz Ascher und Gert Heinrich Wollheim." Galerie d'Hamé, Mülheim/Ruhr, 28 November –
- 2013 – "Diversity Destroyed. Berlin 1933-1938-1945. A City Remembers" (Zerstörte Vielfalt. Berlin 1933-1938-1945. Eine Stadt erinnert sich) Kulturprojekte Berlin, information pillar Frankfurter Tor, Berlin 31 January – 10 November
- 1996 – Synagogue for the Arts, New York, 14 March – 12 April
- 1993 – International Monetary Fund Art Forum, Washington, DC, 30 March – 21 May
- 1980 – Schwarzbach Gallery, Sindelfingen, October
- 1980 – Kreissparkasse Böblingen, 21 March – 25 April
- 1979 – Ute Freckmann Gallery, Sindelfingen, 21–28 July
- 1969 – Fritz Ascher: Bilder nach 1945, Galerie Springer, Berlin, Berlin
- 1947 – Das Naturerlebnis. Landschaftsbilder bekannter Künstler, Kunstamt Wilmersdorf, Berlin
- 1946 – "Fritz Ascher: Bilder nach 1945," with Bernhard Heiliger, Karl Buchholz Gallery, Berlin
- 1924 – Juryfreie Kunstschau, Berlin
- 1922 – Juryfreie Kunstschau, Berlin

== See also ==
- List of German painters
