= Alfonsas Krivickas =

Lithuanian expressionist and folk painter

Alfonsas Krivickas (3 September 1919 – 20 June 1990) was a Lithuanian expressionist and folk painter.

== Biography ==
Alfonsas Krivickas was born on 3 September 1919 in Kaunas. In 1936, he was accepted into the Kaunas Art School. In 1939, he received a prize for his painting Prieplauka (Pier). In 1943, he completed his studies at the Institute of Applied and Decorative Arts in Kaunas. From 1944, he resided in Germany where he participated in various exhibitions as well as opening his own in Lithuania in 1944, Germany in 1950, as well as in Detroit in 1970.

From 1948 to 1950, Krivickas was a regular lecturer in the Freiburg Art School. From 1953 to 1984, he lectured at the Lithuanian Gymnasium in Hüttenfeld, the only recognized Lithuanian school in Western Europe. He became a member of the Union of Artists of Baden-Württemberg in Stuttgart in 1982. Krivickas actively propagated Lithuanian culture. He actively participated in events dedicated to the 100th anniversary of the birth of M. K. Čiurlionis.

He died on 20 June 1990 in Geisenheim, Germany.

== Works ==
Krivickas' works are marked by a variety of styles and techniques. He created a series of stamps, as well as drawings, paintings, and sculptures. His early works are mainly characterized by expressionism, whereas his later works are characterized by more generalized decorative and stylized forms as well as folk-oriented art. His works, among which are the painting cycles Žemė ir kosmosas (Earth and the cosmos, 1972 & 1976), Kosminis pasaulis (Cosmic world, 1986) are held at the Lithuanian National Museum of Art, as well as the M. K. Čiurlionis National Art Museum, and the Centre Pompidou.
