= Tree paint =

Substance applied to damaged surfaces of a tree

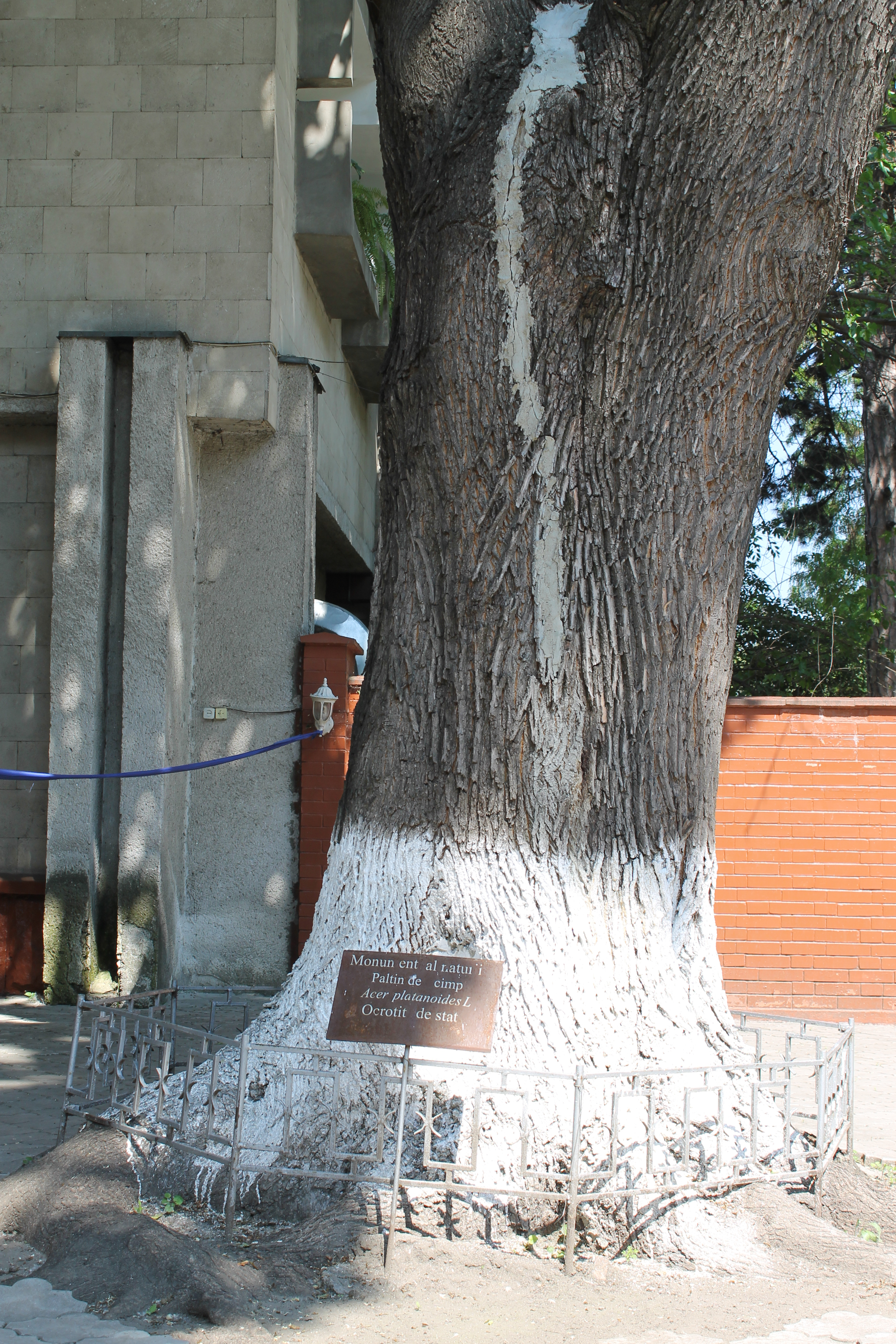
Tree paint on the base of a Norway maple in Chișinău, Moldova

Tree paint, also known as wound dressing, is any substance applied to damaged surfaces of a tree intended to improve its health. It is commonly applied after pruning, or at locations where the tree bark has been damaged.

== Description ==
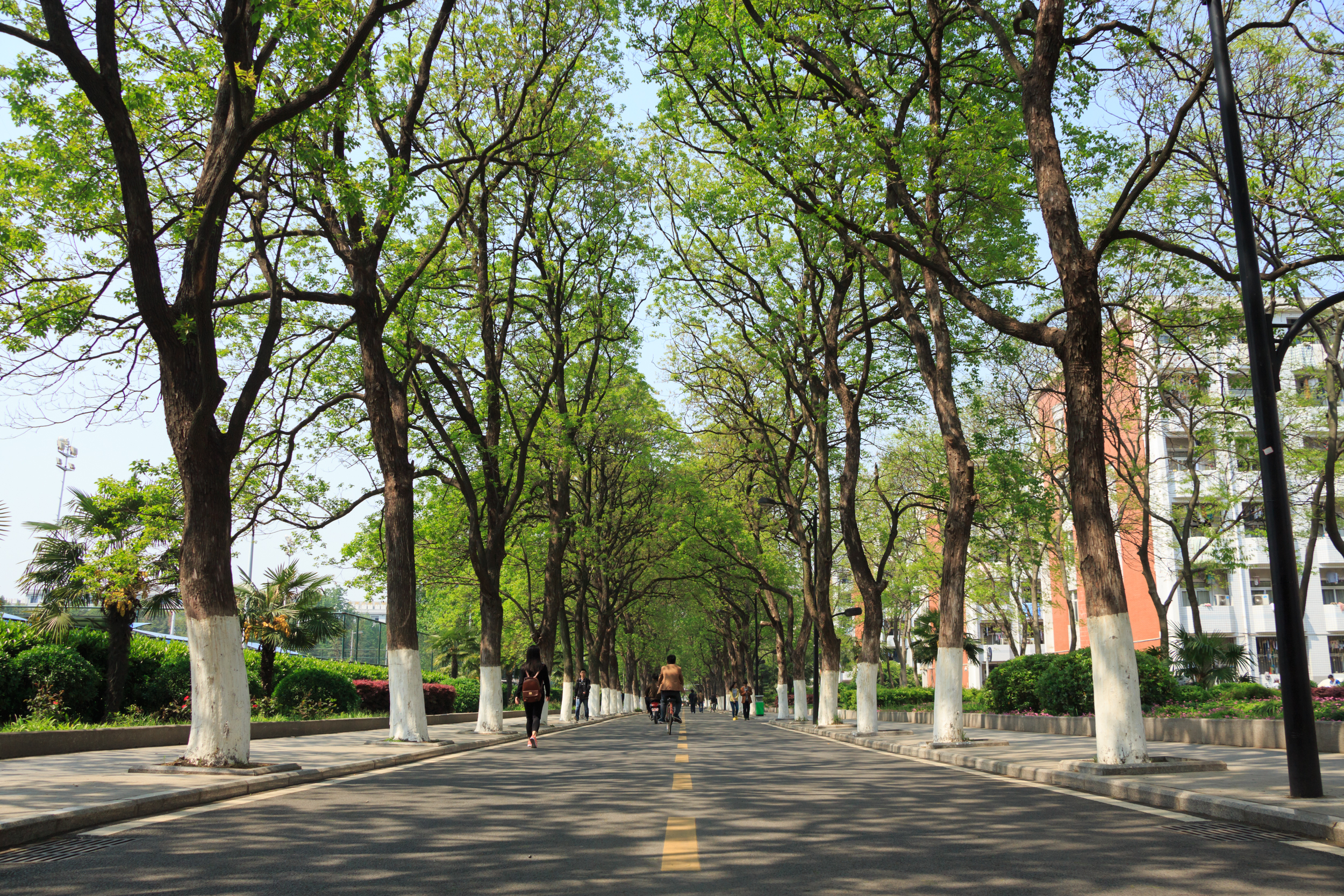
White tree paint on trees along a road in Hefei, China

Tree guard paints are sold as organic and non-organic products. Some gardeners use a light-colored interior latex-based paint diluted with 50% water.

Both summer sunburn and winter sun scald can cause the tree's bark to crack or die, resulting in additional stress which is compounded by insects and parasites that enter the barkless wood, an invasion that will ultimately shorten the tree's life. Tree paint or whitewash protects against this.

Some tree paints, depending on ingredients, also protect against insects and rodents. For example, neem oil has been used by Indian farmers for thousands of years as a natural insect repellent and insecticide. A diluted neem oil spray repels insects and smothers those that come into contact with it, ultimately killing most insects that ingest the product within 1–3 days.

Castor oil, derived from the castor tree seed, gives a coated surface an unpleasant taste to rodents, such as rats, moles, voles, and gophers that may otherwise gnaw on the tree's bark.

Tree paint may help to prevent disease-carrying insects from entering a wounded tree. Studies have shown that wound dressing must be applied immediately after damage or pruning. Even a delay of three days can be too long.

White tree paint is commonly applied to citrus trees to keep the affected tissues from overheating, as dark-colored paint can raise the surface temperature of the treated tissues. The classic tree paint is black, because it is based on an asphalt emulsion.

Tree paint may be applied using spray cans, paint guns, or brushes.

An organic tree paint can be made; it is similar to brushable mud.

== See also ==
- The White Apple Tree, a depiction of a whitewashed apple tree
