= Lithuanian National Museum of Art =

- Lietuvos nacionalinis dailės muziejus

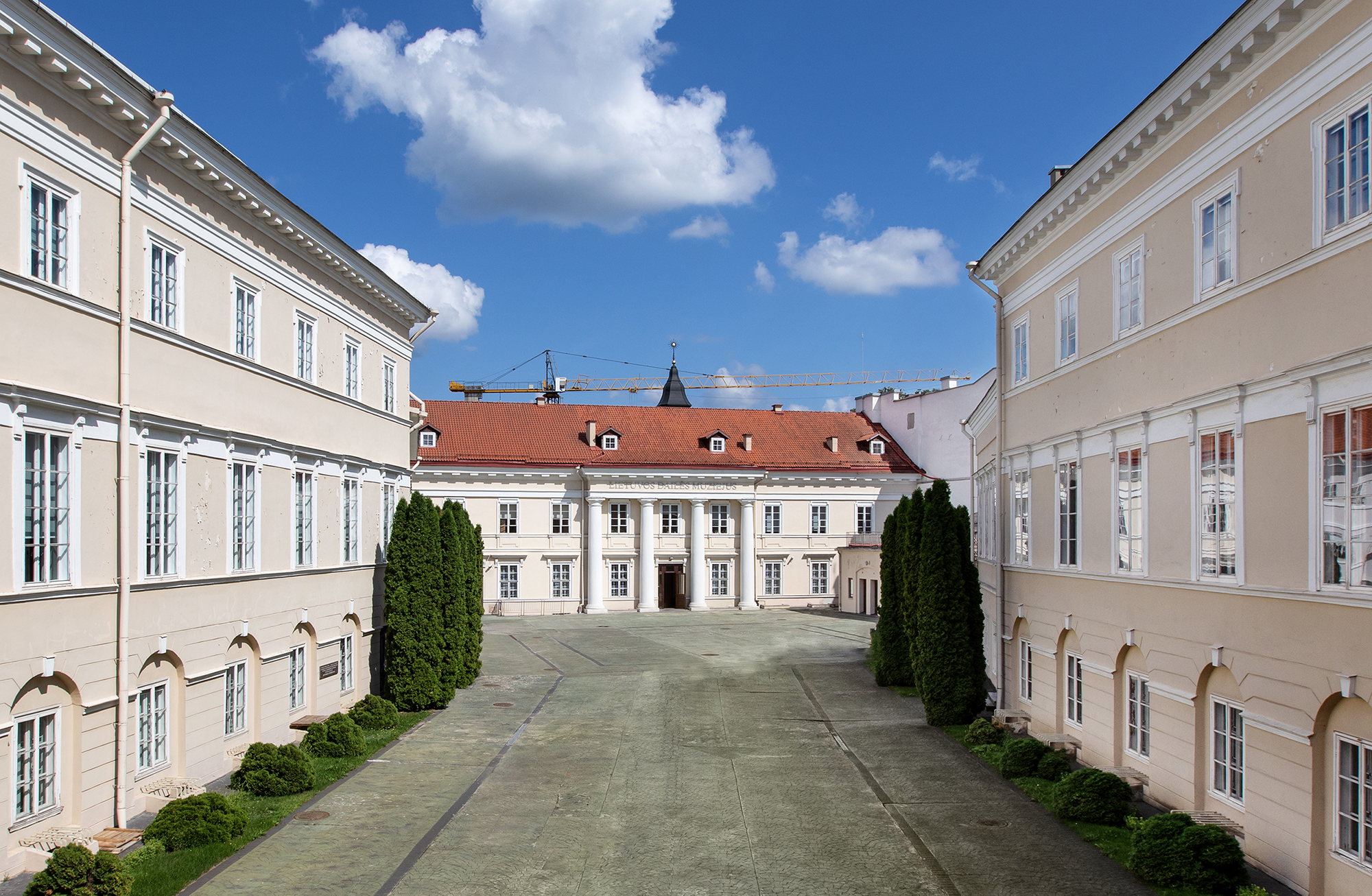
- The Lithuanian National Museum of Art Building, also known as Chodkevičiai Palace, in Vilnius, Lithuania
- Interactive fullscreen map
- Former name: Lithuanian Ar Museum
- Established: 1933; 93 years ago
- Location: Vilnius, Lithuania
- Coordinates: 54°40′51″N 25°17′24″E
- Type: Art museum
- Director: Arūnas Gelūnas
- Owner: Lithuanian Ministry of Culture
- Website: www.lndm.lt

Lithuanian National Museum of Art (Lithuanian: Lietuvos nacionalinis dailės muziejus) is the largest national museum in Lithuania collecting, restoring, and conserving art as well as historical objects of cultural value while presenting artefacts of national importance in exhibition spaces located in the coastal cities and the capital.

The Museum is established by Ministry of Culture of the Republic of Lithuania. As of 1995, the Museum belongs to the International Council of Museums (ICOM).

== History ==
The institution's origins can be traced to the early 20th century. The Museum started to develop as a public institution with a resurgence of cultural interest following the end of the ban on the Lithuanian language that was imposed by the Russian Empire. A number of art exhibitions at that time donated works to the Lithuanian Art Society, which began to make plans for a permanent facility. The activity was interrupted by World War I.

During the postwar era, the plans were restarted. In 1933, the Vilnius Magistracy, an administrative division of the Polish government that controlled Vilnius at the time, decided to establish Vilnius City Museum. Works of art were collected and stored in various buildings, but were not accessible to visitors. In April 1941, its first exhibitions were held; it was known at the time as the Vilnius State Art Museum. From 1966 the Museum was called Lithuanian Art Museum; in January 1997, the new government of Lithuania granted the Museum its current status as a national museum. As of 2020 the official title of the Museum continues to be Lithuanian National Museum of Art.

== Branches ==
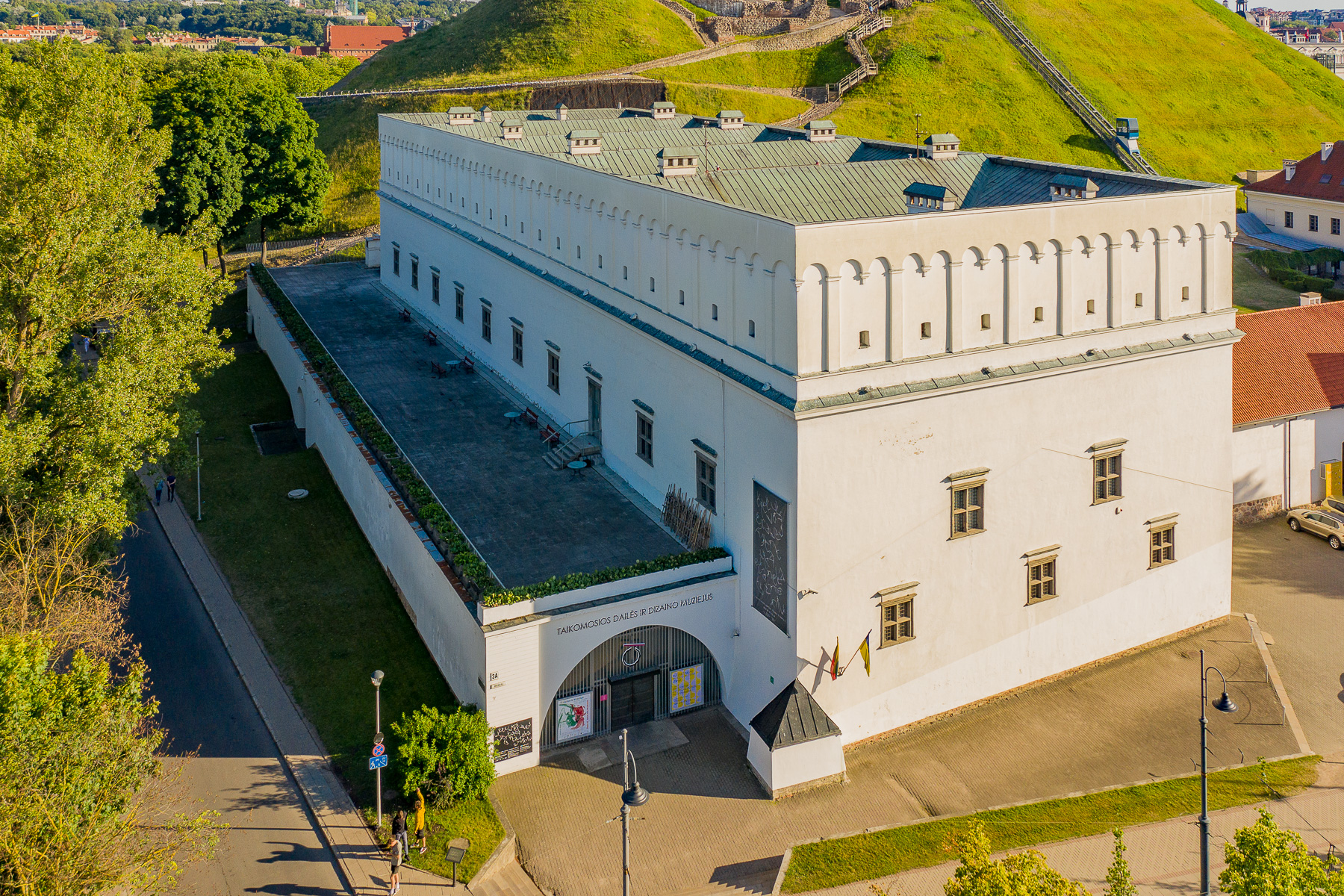
Museum of Applied Art

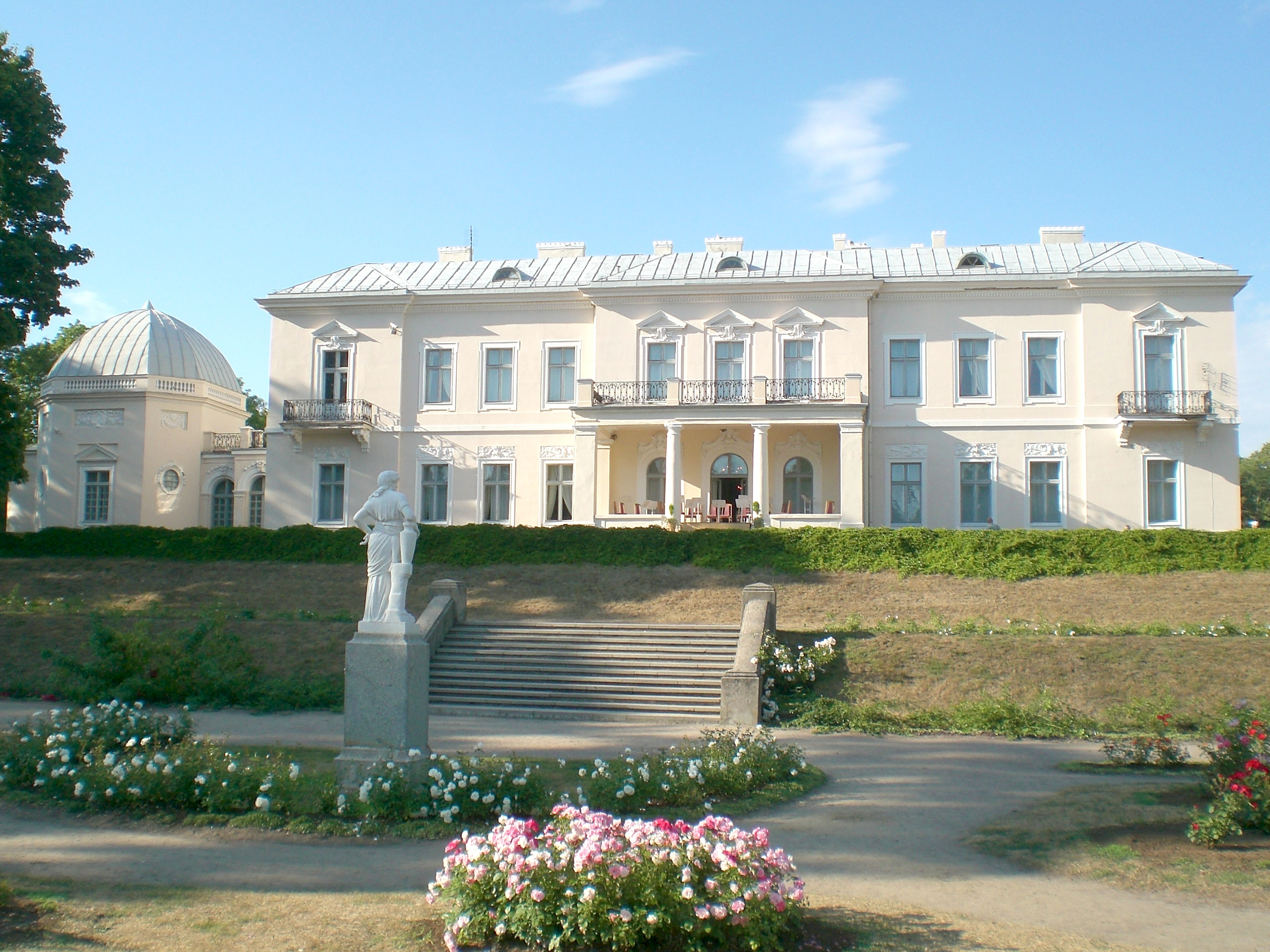
Amber Museum in Palanga

The Museum exhibits and exhibitions take place in 9 venues located in Vilnius and coastal region of Lithuania: Vilnius Picture Gallery, National Gallery of Art, Clock and Watch Museum, Radvila Palace Museum of Art, Vytautas Kasiulis Museum of Art, Pranas Domšaitis Gallery, Museum of Applied Arts and Design, Palanga Amber Museum, and Pamarys Gallery.

The Museum is visited by around 350 thousand visitors annually.

== Collections ==
The collections at the Museum consist of around 250 thousand valuable objects. They include about 2,500 paintings dating from the 16th to 19th centuries, mostly portraits of nobility and clergy of the Lithuanian Grand Duchy from the 16th to 18th centuries, as well as religious works from Lithuanian churches and cloisters. The Museum houses over 8,000 drawings by Italian, German, French, Flemish, Dutch, Polish, English, and Japanese artists from the 15th to 20th centuries.

The first half of the 20th century has an extensive presence with over 12,000 works. The collection from the second half of the 20th century features more than 21,000 objects. Collections of sculptures consist of works from the 14th to 20th centuries, coming from a number of European countries. Other notable collections include works done in watercolor and pastel, and photography.

Section of applied arts features works and objects made from amber, ceramics, metal, porcelain, glass, textile, and leather as well as furniture, numismatics, and clocks. The Museum has accumulated and displays the wealth of the national folk art, consisting of clothes, fabrics, crosses, chapels, paintings, prints, and wooden sculptures.

Today all museums in Lithuania use the services provided by Pranas Gudynas Centre for Restoration. Its employees are highly qualified restoration specialists who research, conserve, and restore art works, historical as well as archaeological artefacts. Another important branch of the Museum is Lithuanian Museums' Centre for Information, Digitisation and LIMIS centre. Its mission is to organise and coordinate the digitisation of Museums' valuables, to present Lithuania's national holdings on international portals and thus to enrich European digital collections.

== Selected collection highlights ==
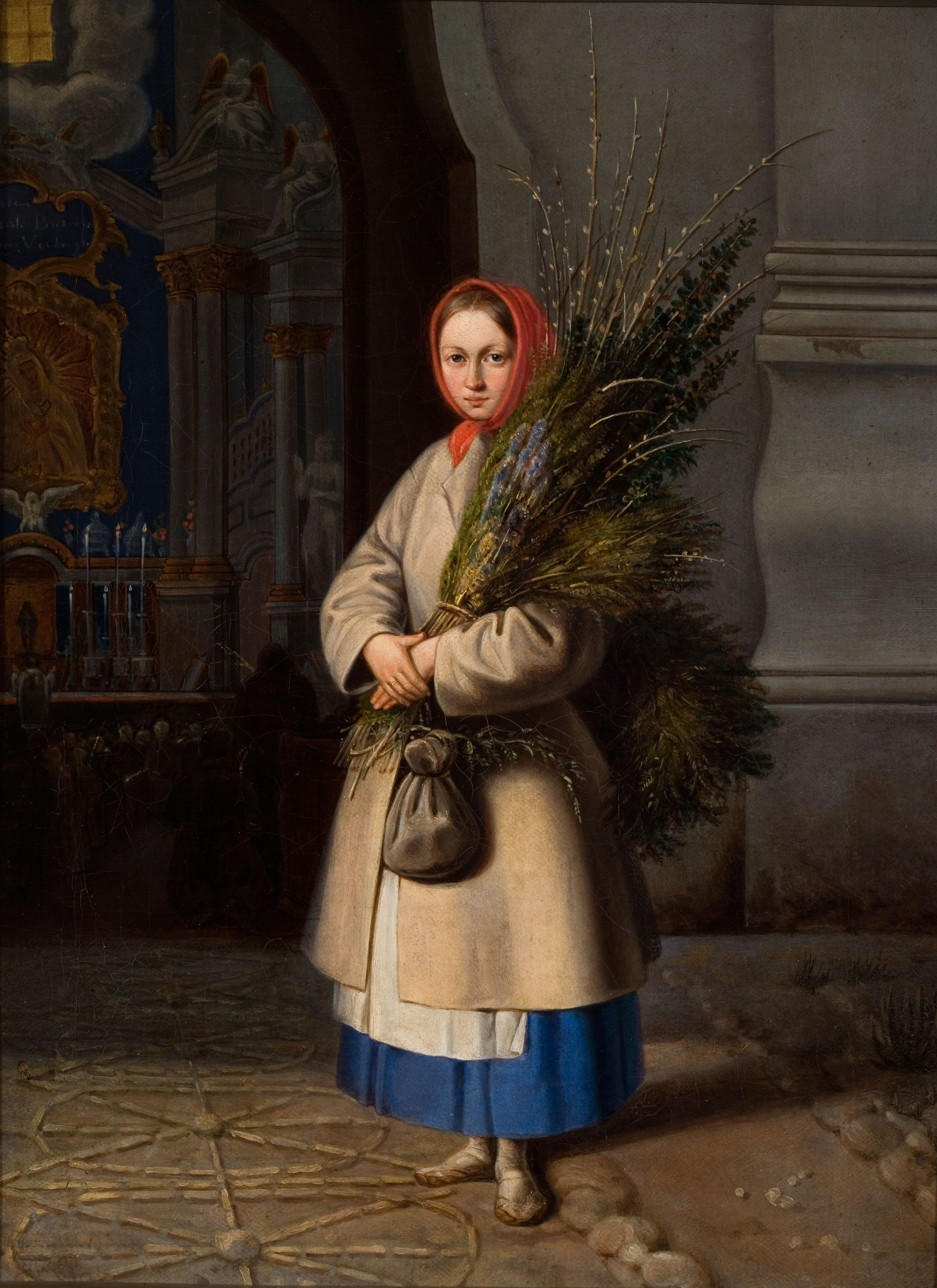
Lithuanian Girl with Palm Sunday Fronds, Kanuty Rusiecki

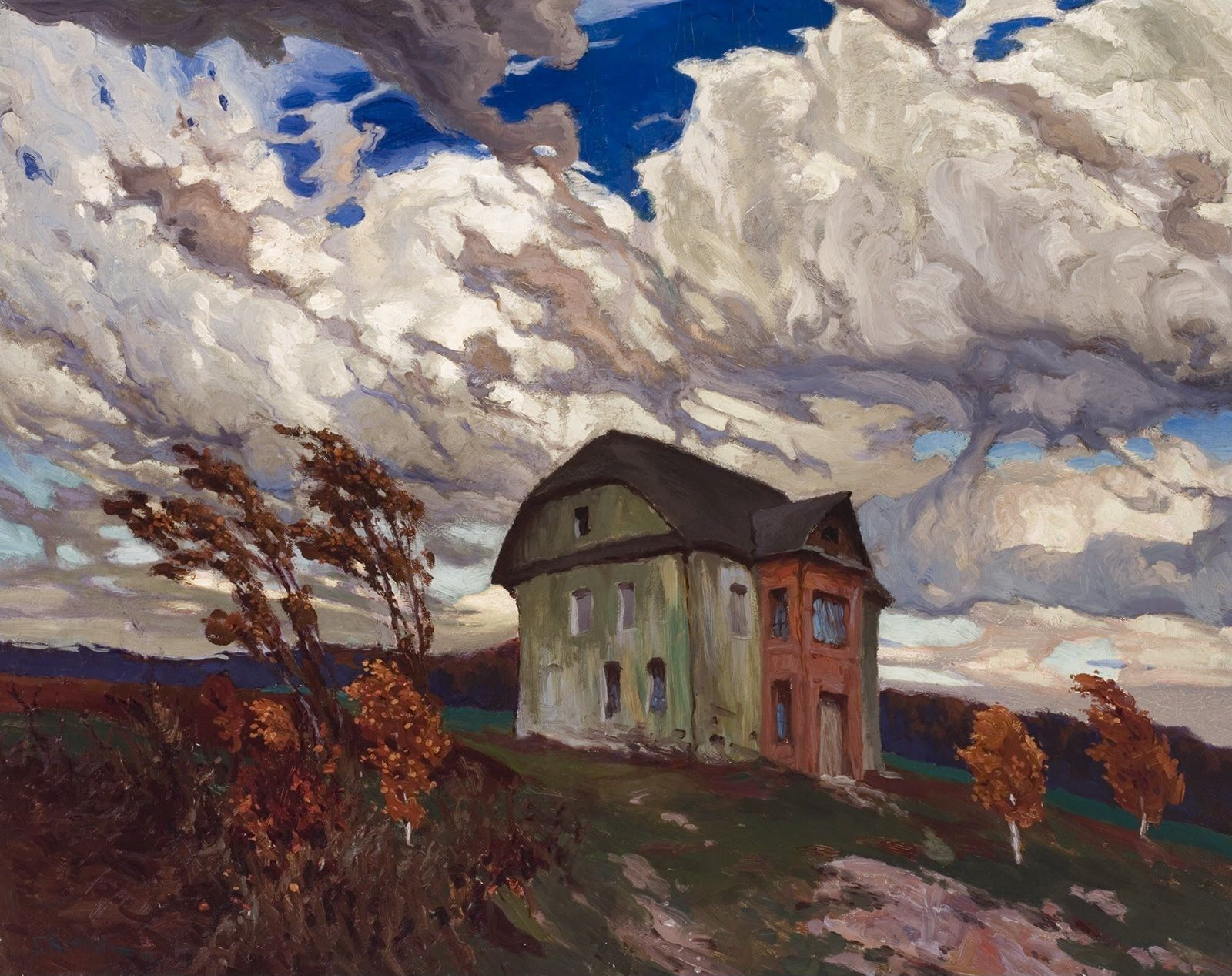
Wind in autumn (Emptiness), Ferdynand Ruszczyc

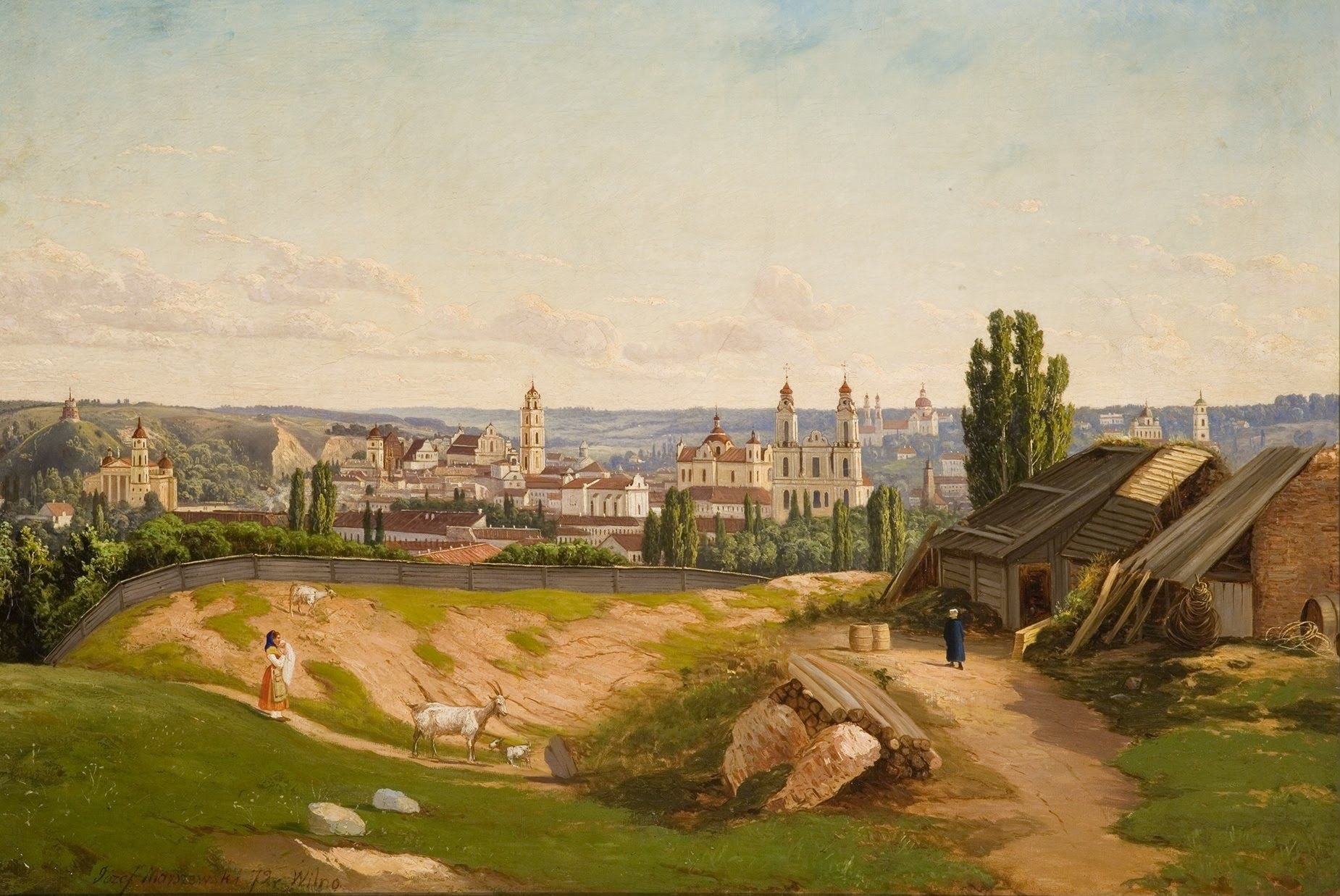
Vilnius viewed from Tauras Hill, Józef Marszewski

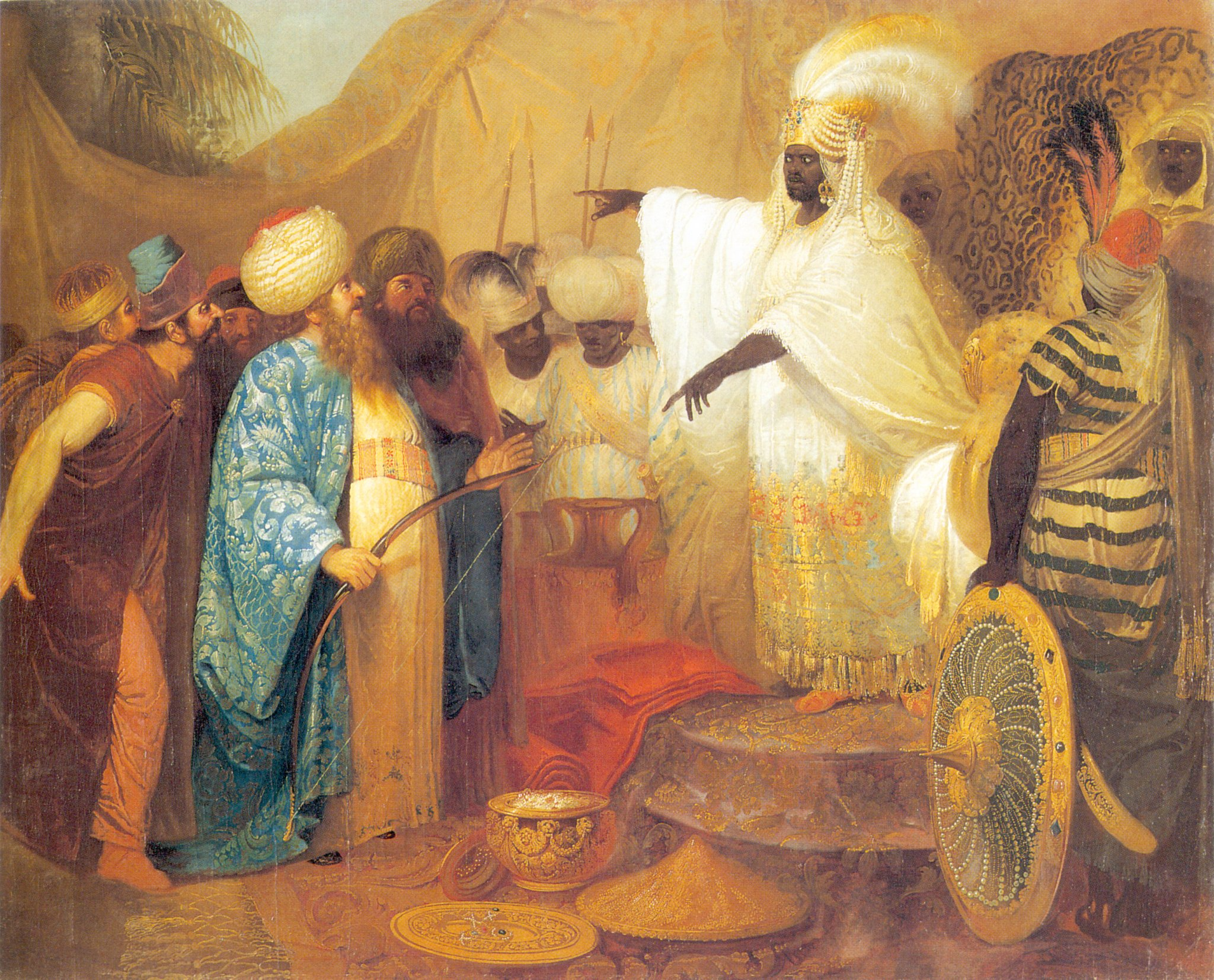
Persian Envoys before the King of Ethiopia, Franciszek Smuglewicz

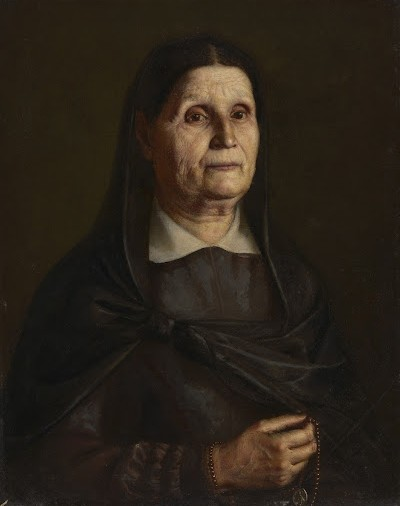
Portrait of the Mother, Karol Rafałowicz

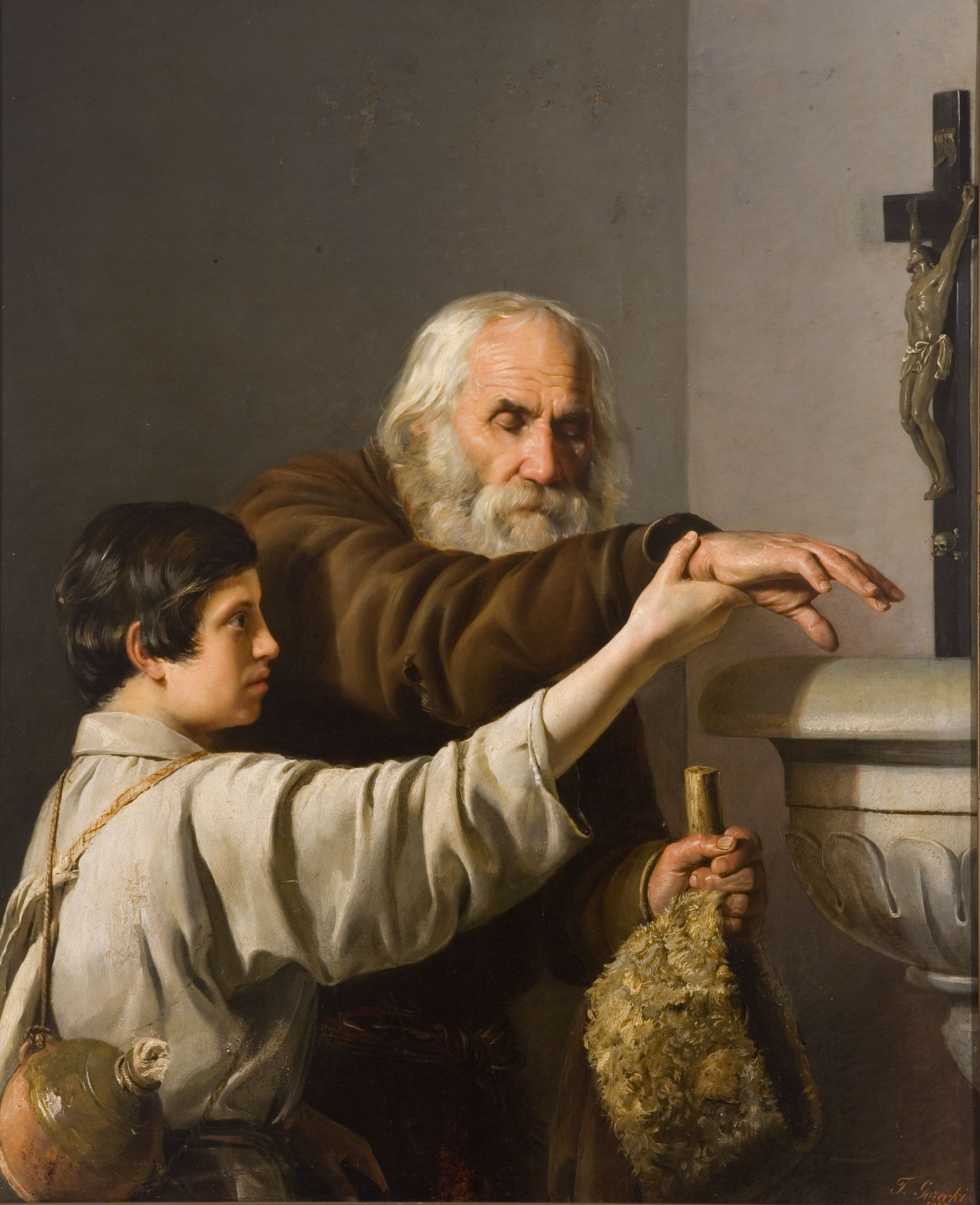
Blind Beggar with a Boy, Tadeusz Gorecki

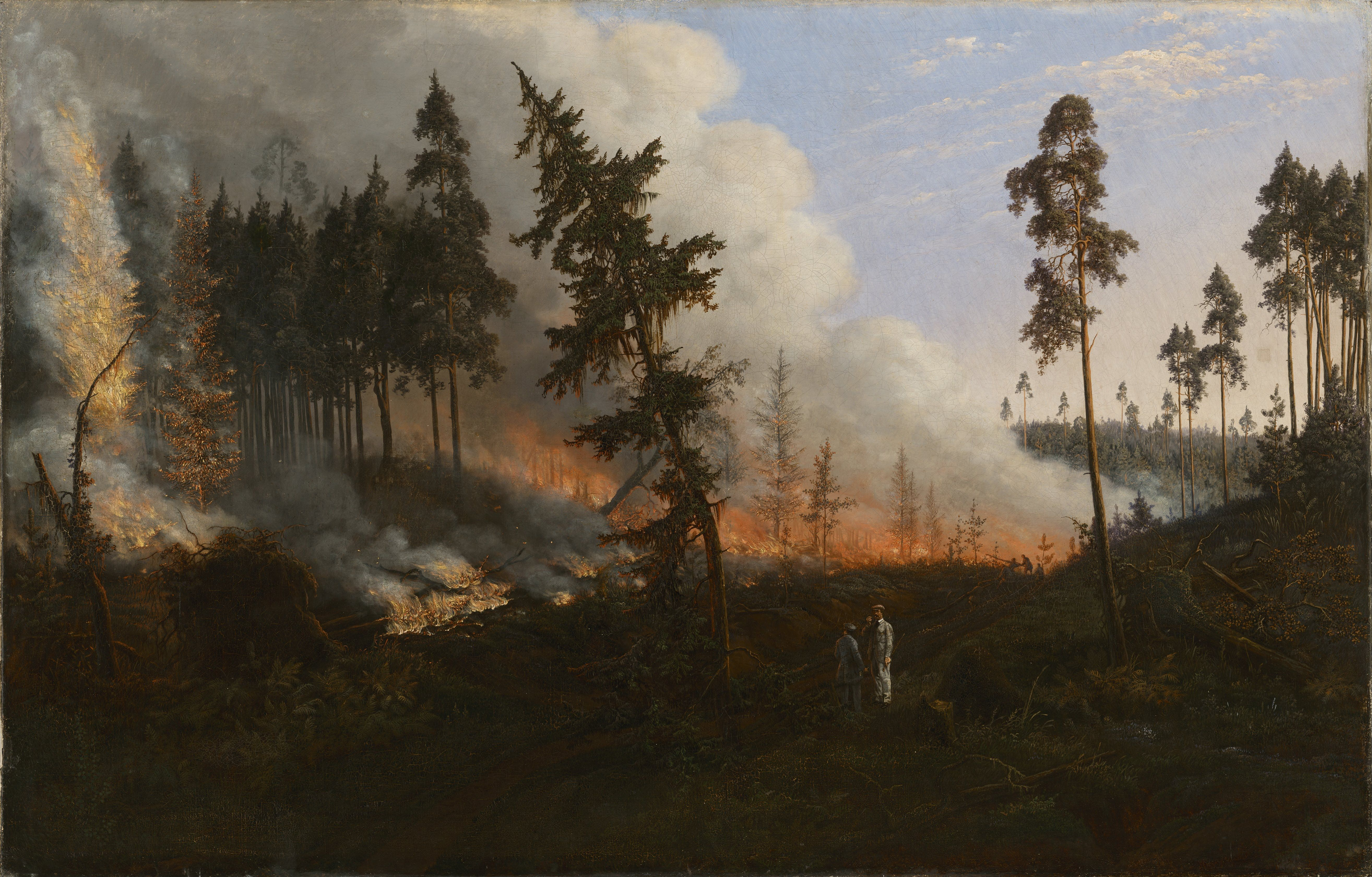
Forest fire, Wincenty Dmochowski

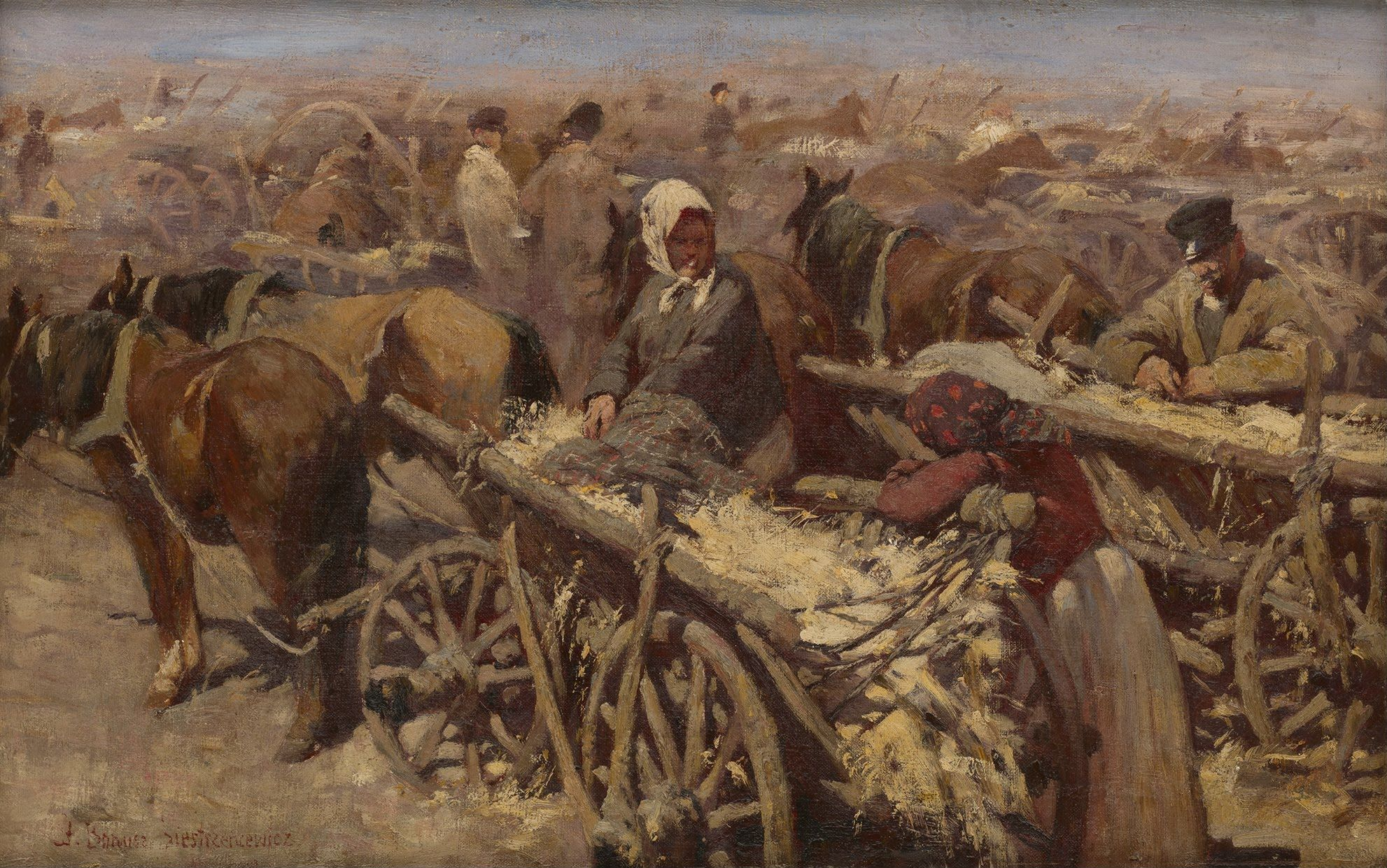
Market, Stanisław Bohusz-Siestrzeńcewicz

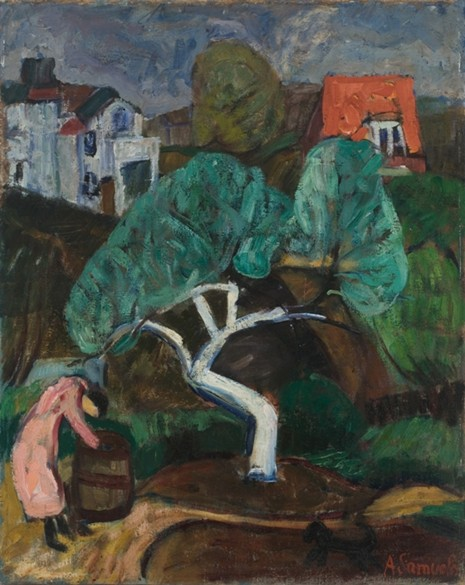
White Apple Tree, Antanas Samuolis

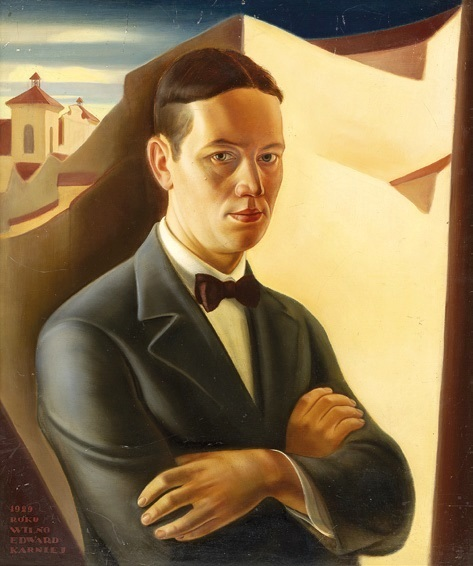
Self-portrait, Edward Karniej

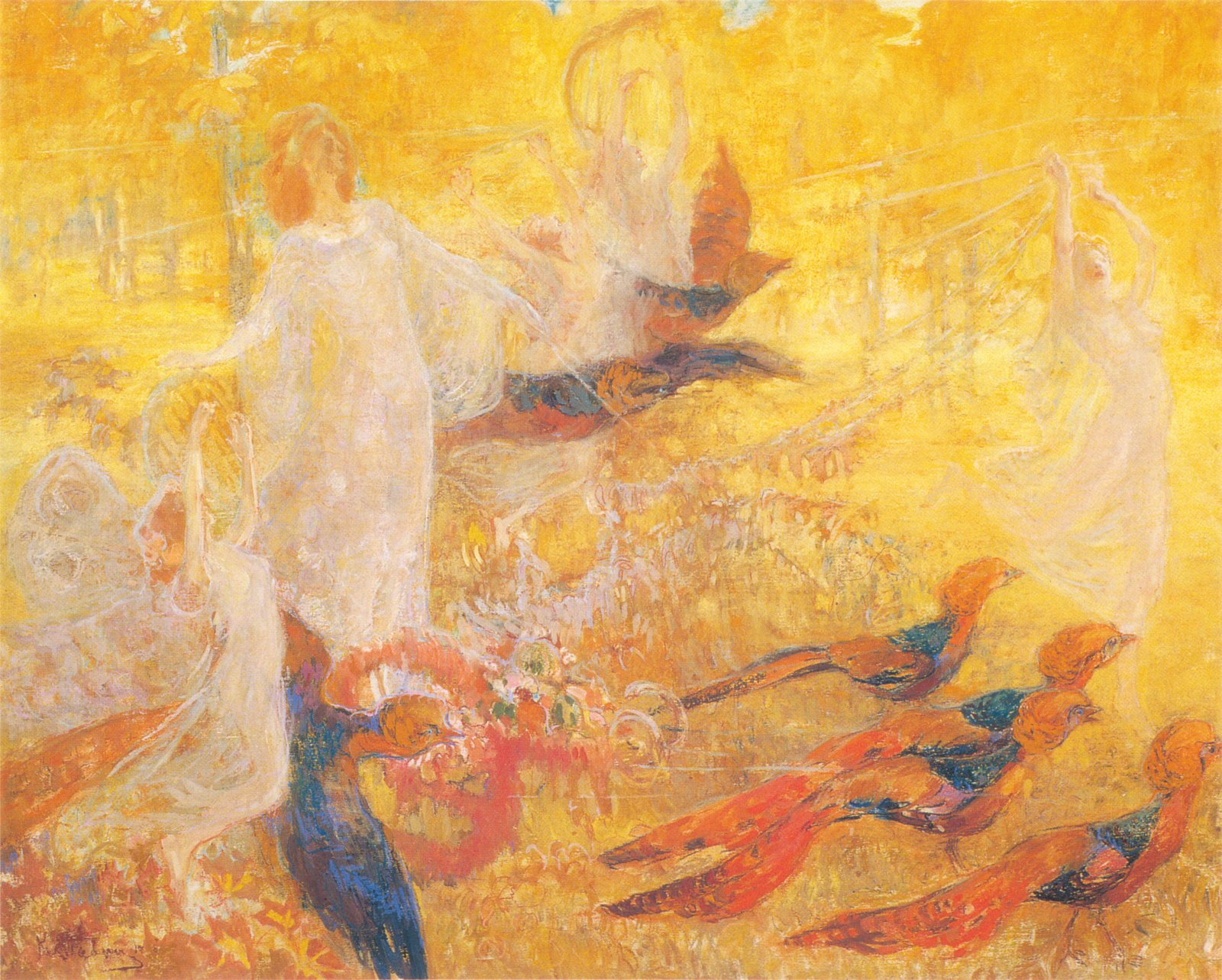
Golden autumn fairy tale, Kazimierz Stabrowski

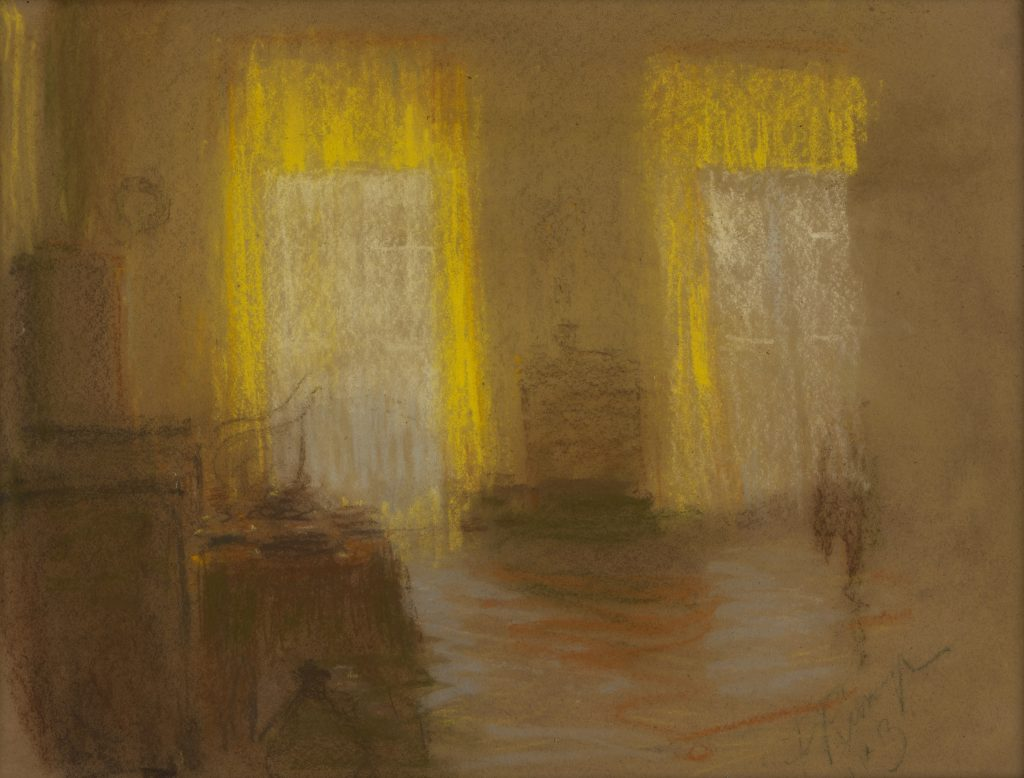
Golden room, Ferdynand Ruszczyc

== Directors ==
- Adolfas Valeška – 1940–1944
- Levas Karsavinas – 1944–1949
- Bronius Petrauskas – 1949–1950
- T. Filipaitis – 1950–1953
- Pranas Gudynas – 1953–1979
- Romualdas Budrys – 1979–2019
- Arūnas Gelūnas – from 2019

== See also ==
- Woman with the Artist by Vytautas Kasiulis
- Scene of a Lithuanian Village by Pranas Domšaitis
- All Through the Night by Antanas Žmuidzinavičius
- List of national galleries
