= Chodkiewicz Palace, Vilnius =

Palace in Vilnius, Lithuania

Chodkiewicz Palace
- Chodkevičių rūmai
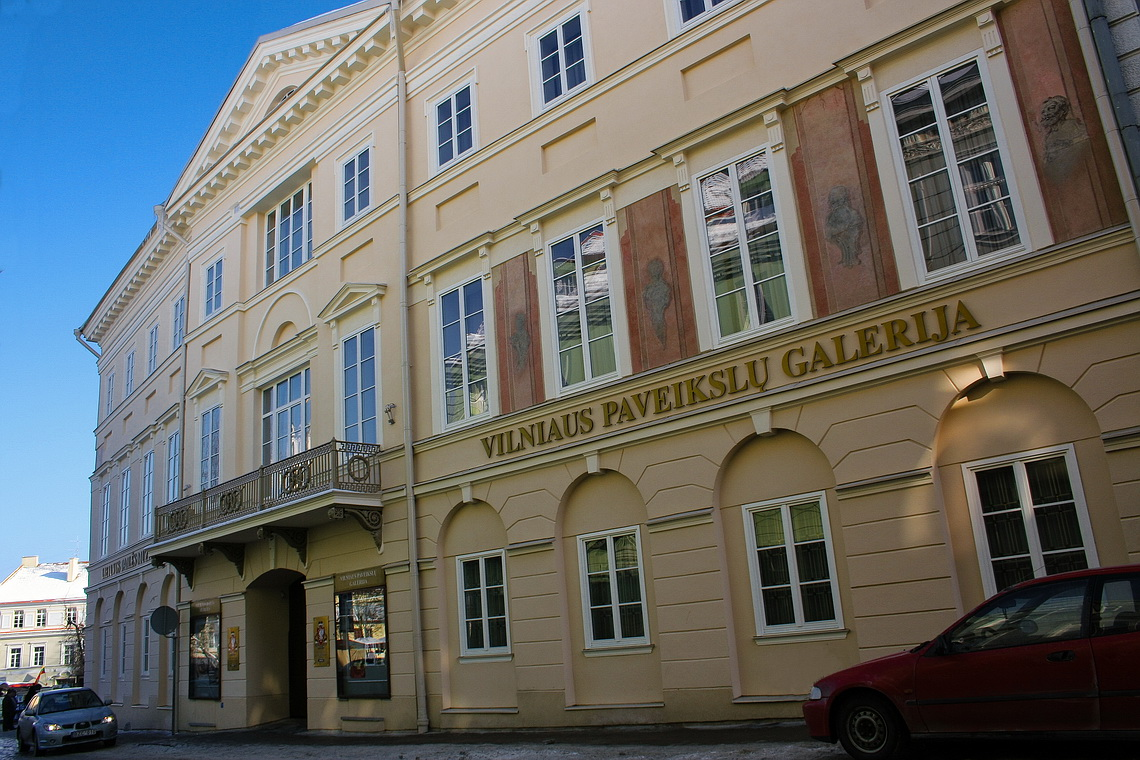
- Main façade of Chodkiewicz Palace

General information
- Architectural style: Late Neoclassical
- Location: Vilnius Old Town, Vilnius, Lithuania, Didžioji Street 4
- Coordinates: 54°40′50″N 25°17′20″E
- Current tenants: Vilnius Picture Gallery
- Construction started: c. 1600
- Renovated: 1754–1762; c. 1825–1834
- Client: Jan Karol Chodkiewicz

Design and construction
- Architects: Abraham Wurtzner and Franciszek Offert (1754–1762 reconstruction); Tomasz Tyszecki (19th-century reconstruction)

Chodkiewicz Palace (Lithuanian: Chodkevičių rūmai) is a historic palace in the Old Town of Vilnius, Lithuania, located at 4 Didžioji Street. Originally established around 1600 as an urban residence of the Chodkiewicz family, one of the most influential noble families of the Grand Duchy of Lithuania, the palace was expanded and rebuilt several times during the 17th and 18th centuries. It acquired its present Late Neoclassical appearance during a major reconstruction carried out around 1825–1834 under architect Tomasz Tyszecki.

The palace remained in the possession of the Chodkiewicz family until the early 19th century, when it was acquired by Wojciech Pusłowski. It subsequently housed the Vilnius Medical-Surgical Academy and various educational institutions, including Vilnius University. Since 1994, the palace has housed the Vilnius Picture Gallery, a branch of the Lithuanian National Museum of Art, as well as the museum's administrative offices, library, archives and art storage facilities.

== History ==
Jan Karol Chodkiewicz purchased a brick building just before 1600, located next to the Church of St. Paraskeva at the edge of the Ruthenian district in Vilnius, along the prestigious Royal Road. The building had been constructed in the 15th century, and Chodkiewicz began transforming it into a palace, acquiring neighboring plots. His work was continued by his heir and nephew, Hieronim Chodkiewicz. The palace was destroyed during the Moscow occupation in the mid-17th century and was rebuilt by Jerzy Karol Chodkiewicz, who added images of dragons to the facade of the residence, leading to the building being called "Under the Dragons."

Between 1754 and 1762, the palace was rebuilt by Abraham Wurtzner and Franciszek Offert at the request of Jan Mikołaj Chodkiewicz. In 1812, the palace became the property of Wojciech Pusłowski, a deputy to the Four-Year Sejm and an entrepreneur who acquired neglected estates. He significantly expanded the palace, leading Michał Baliński to describe it as "the most beautiful private residence in Vilnius."

In 1834, the palace became part of the Medical-Surgical Academy, which was established after the closure of the Vilnius Academy. During this period, it underwent significant reconstruction under the direction of Tomasz Tyszecki, including the demolition of buildings separating the palace from the church, opening the northern facade to the street. Over the following years, the palace's function changed multiple times, and in 1919, it was incorporated into Vilnius University, primarily serving as housing for faculty members. After 1945, it remained part of the university.

Since 1994 it has been owned by the Lithuanian Art Museum and houses a picture gallery, administrative offices, the library, archive and art storage.

== Bibliography ==
- Czyż, Anna Sylwia (2021). Pałace Wilna XVII–XVIII wieku [Palaces of Vilnius 17th-18th centuries] (in Polish). Warsaw: Narodowy Instytut Polskiego Dziedzictwa Kulturowego za Granicą POLONIKA.
