= Antanas Samuolis =

Lithuanian painter

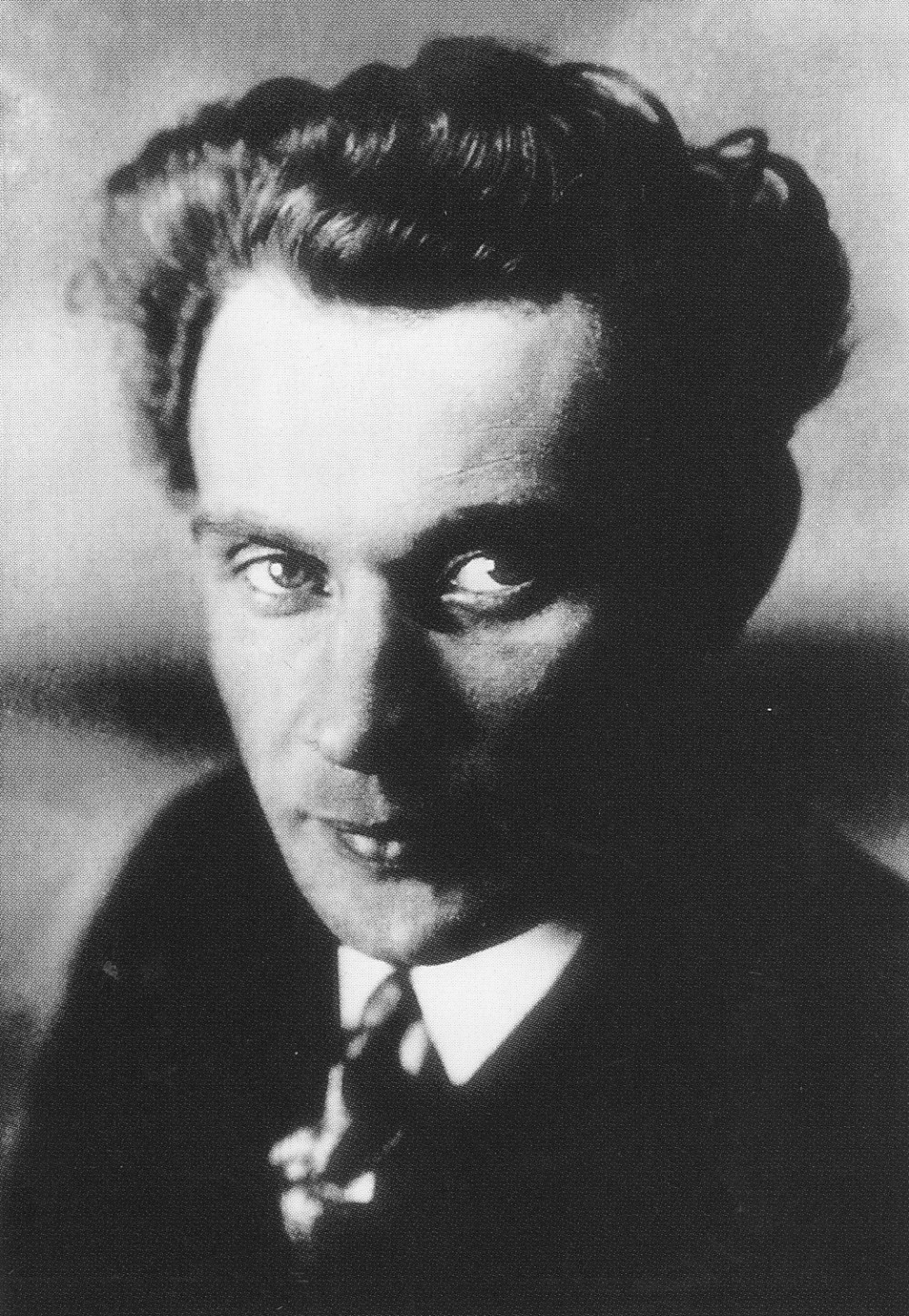
- Born: 3 June 1899; Puišiai, Kovno Governorate, Russian Empire
- Died: 9 February 1942 (aged 42); Leysin, Canton of Vaud, Switzerland
- Resting place: Leysin cemetery
- Education: Kaunas School of Arts
- Known for: Painting
- Notable work: Baltoji obelis (1932); Geltona moteris (1934)
- Movement: Expressionism

Antanas Samuolis (born Antanas Samulevičius; 3 June 1899 – 9 February 1942) was a prominent Lithuanian interwar expressionist painter. Considered one of the most capable students of Justinas Vienožinskis, Samuolis's paintings have had a significant impact on Lithuanian art of the first half of the 20th century.

Samuolis is the uncle of painter Raimundas Samulevičius through his brother and his wife and painter Stasė Samulevičienė.

== Biography ==
Antanas Samuolis was born on 9 June 1899 in the village of Puišiai of the Kovno Governorate of the Russian Empire. In 1900 Samuolis's family moved to Kaunas. During the First World War, Samuolis lived in Moscow, where he attended a railwaymen school. From 1919 to 1921 he served in the Lithuanian Army. From 1922 to 1923 Samuolis attended drawing courses in Kaunas. After graduating from the Kaunas School of Arts in 1929 under Justinas Vienožinskis, Samuolis earned a living by doing commissions (painting portraits, religious paintings, as well as retouching old photographs). In 1925, along with graphic painter Antanas Tamošaitis, Samuolis decorated churches in the Kaunas district, as well as the Kaunas Priest Seminary. Samuolis wished to study abroad, but the lack of money and student protests prohibited him from traveling. Samuolis became interested in impressionist-like art after seeing French newspapers and reproductions containing the works of Vincent van Gogh.

After participating in various art expositions in 1930, Samuolis became one of the founders of the Society of Independent Artists and stayed as one of its members until 1933. Since that year Samuolis underwent constant treatment for Tuberculosis in a sanatorium. From 1932 to 1934 Samuolis was part of the Ars artist group. He participated in artist expositions in Malmö in 1934, in Riga as well as Tallinn. In 1935 Samuolis entered the Lithuanian Artists' Association. From 1937 to 1939 Samuolis lived in the Jonava district. In 1939 he moved to Switzerland to enter a hospital to further his treatment of tuberculosis, but the outbreak of the Second World War left him stuck in the country, unable to return to Lithuania. He lived the remainder of his life in Switzerland and died in the village of Leysin on 9 February 1942. The exact location of his grave is unknown.

== Paintings ==
Samuolis's paintings are marked by vivid, rich colors and expressive landscapes, as well as elements of the grotesque and satire. The gloomy, melancholic, and lonely everyday life is contrasted with the beauty of nature. Influenced by the likes of Paul Cézanne and Rembrandt, Samuolis painted around 60 paintings, the most famous of which are Baltoji obelis (The White Apple Tree, 1932) and Geltona moteris (Yellow Woman, 1934). He also painted still life paintings. Samuolis's paintings are housed in the M. K. Čiurlionis National Art Museum, the Lithuanian National Museum of Art, and his temporary residence in Prauliai. A 2024 analysis revealed that his painting Geltona moteris was painted on the other side of another one of his paintings, revealing Samuolis's priority of saving canvases due to financial difficulties.

== Gallery ==
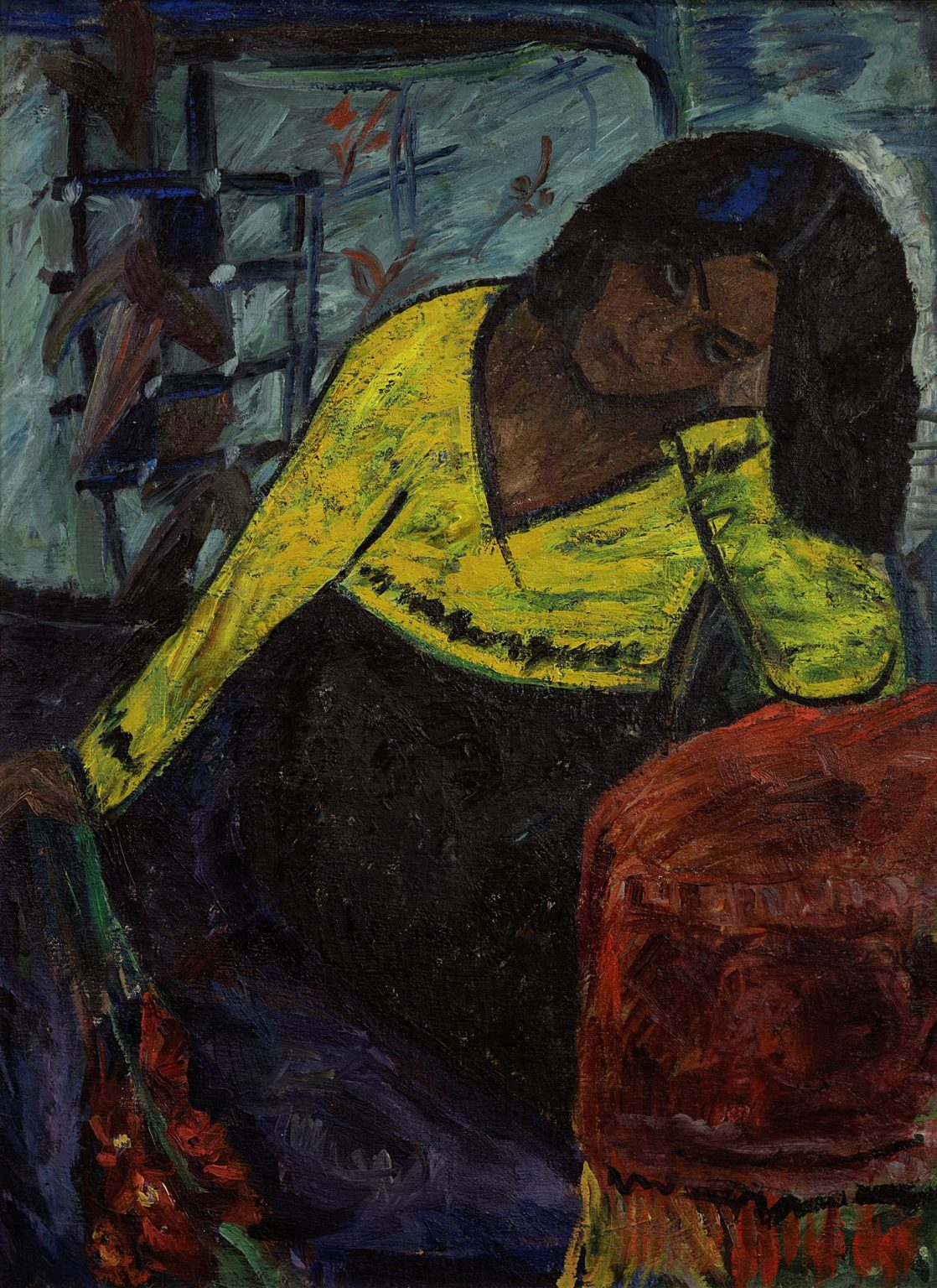
Yellow Woman, 1933

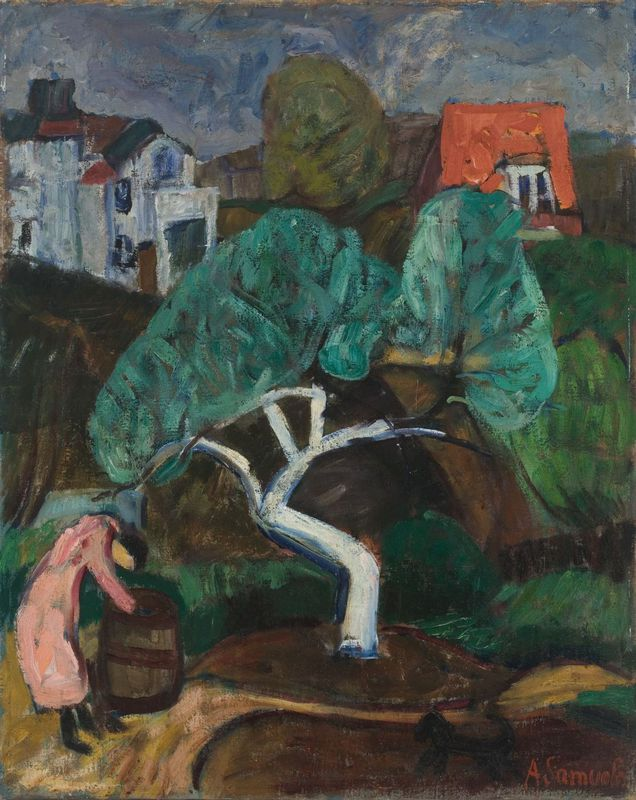
The White Apple Tree, 1932

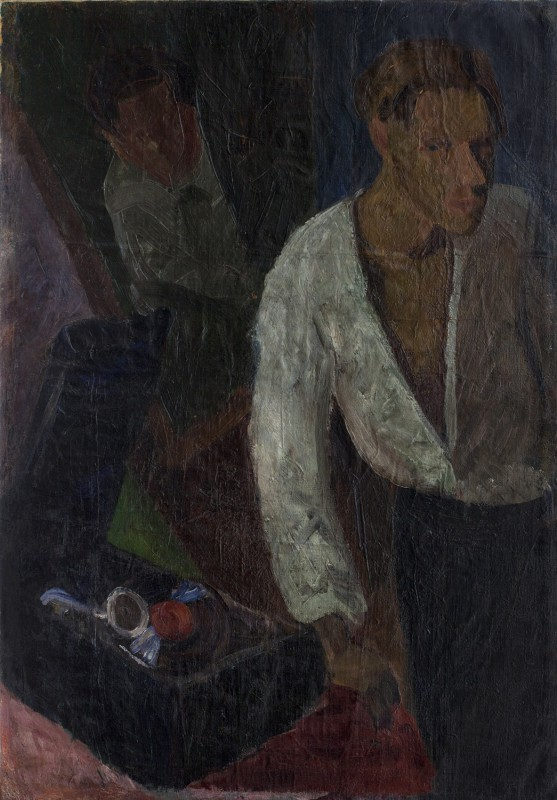
Autoportrait of Antanas Samuolis, 1929

== Remembrance ==
In 1964, a commemorative plaque was built near his former home in Žaliakalnis. A second plaque was uncovered in 2005. In 1991, the Samulevičiai Memorial Museum opened near his hometown of Puišiai. Since 1994, Kaunas has hosted international artists' symposia dedicated to the memory of Samuolis.
