= Vytautas Kasiulis =

Lithuanian painter

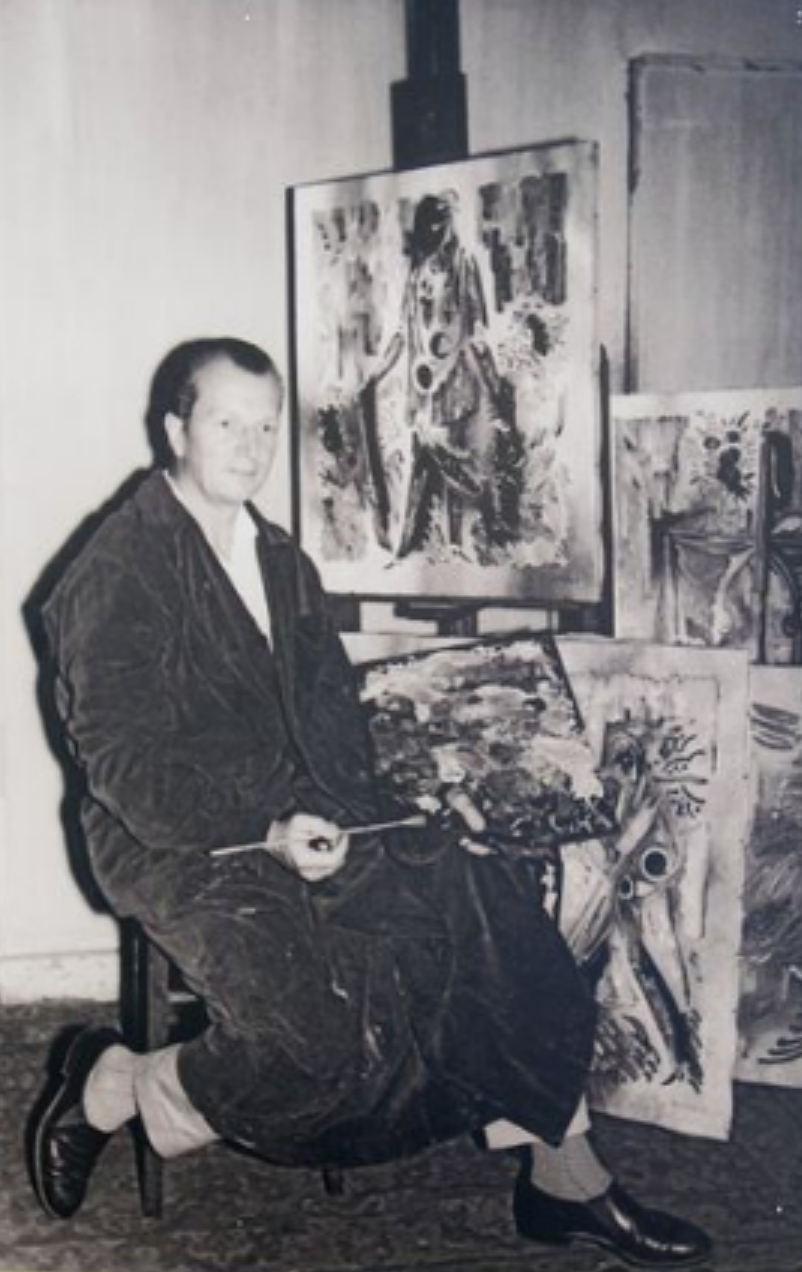
Vytautas Kasiulis

Vytautas Kasiulis (23 April 1918 in Simnas, Alytus County – 12 March 1995 in Paris) was a Lithuanian painter of the School of Paris. He was one of the most famous Lithuanian artists who became exiled in Paris after the annexation of their country by the Soviet Union.

== Biography ==
In the beginning of 1942, in Kaunas, Kasiulis participated in several group expositions and had a solo exhibition at the Vytautas Magnus Museum of Culture in 1943. He left the following year for Germany, to teach at the Fine Arts School in Fribourg-en-Brisgau. After this, he had several solo expositions in Kiel, Bad Siegelberg, Hamburg and Fribourg.

He arrived in Paris in 1948, his first exposition was held at Raymond Duncan's gallery in 1949. Starting in 1954, he also showed his work outside France, notably in Berlin, Copenhagen, Geneva, Stockholm, Cleveland, New York, and Toronto. He also participated in several salons, including the Salon Des Indépendants.

He was buried in the Pantin cemetery in Paris. In 2018 he was reburied in Antakalnis Cemetery.

== Work ==
Titled Les Jardins du Paradis de Vytautas Kasiulis (The Gardens of Paradise of Vyatautas Kasiulis), a retrospective of more than 150 Kasiulis works, many on loan from his widow Bronė Kasiulienė, was presented December 2009 to February 2010 at the Lithuanian Art Museum in Vilnius. Bronė Kasiulienė offered them the collection at the time if they would create a Vytautas Kasiulis Museum.

In May and June 2010, works by five artists of Lithuanian origin exiled in Paris – Arbit Blatas, Vytautas Kasiulis, Antanas Moncys, Pranas Gailius and Žibuntas Mikšys – were presented to the Žilinskas Art Gallery in Kaunas.

In 2013, the Vytautas Kasiulis Museum of Art was created in Vilnius.

== See also ==
- Woman with the Artist
