= Pranas Domšaitis =

Prussian Lithuanian painter

Pranas Domšaitis (born Franz Karl Wilhelm Domscheit, 15 August 1880 – 14 November 1965) was a Prussian Lithuanian painter.

Born in Cropiens (now in Guryevsky District), a village in the East Prussia near Königsberg, Domšaitis spent his first 27 years as a farmer. Under the sponsorship of Max Liebermann he enrolled at the Royal Academy of Fine Arts in Königsberg in 1907, graduating in 1910; this was his first formal schooling. He then travelled to, and studied at, various European capitals; he was strongly influenced by a meeting with Edvard Munch. In particular, Domšaitis studied in 1910 in Berlin with Lovis Corinth. He befriended and travelled with the artist Fritz Ascher from Berlin, who drew a portrait of him in 1919/20. He spent World War I partially on his parents' farm and partially in military service, and then resumed his travels and artistic career. His successful exhibitions in Germany, Switzerland, Austria, Romania, and Turkey were disastrously followed by his inclusion in a 1937 exhibition of Degenerate art and the removal of his works from German museums. In 1938 he began signing his pictures using the Lithuanian version of his name (he had taken Lithuanian citizenship in 1920). He spent the war painting "harmless" still lifes. In 1949 the University of Cape Town in South Africa offered his wife, the singer Adelheid Armhold, a position as a senior lecturer. He spent the rest of his life there.

His youthful style has been described as romantic realism or as spiritual impressionism, his later as a melding of "...Chagall's enchanting visions, the guileless piety of Rouault, the resonant colour of the expressionists, and the intuitive wisdom of the peasant." Landscapes and village life were frequent themes, along with Christian narratives, particularly the Annunciation, the Crucifixion, and the Flight into Egypt.

Domšaitis's works are held at the Pranas Domšaitis Gallery in Klaipėda, Lithuania, the M. K. Čiurlionis National Art Museum in Kaunas, Lithuania, the Pretoria Art Museum, the National Gallery of Zimbabwe, and the National Gallery in Berlin, among others. Many of his interwar works have disappeared.
