= Vytenis Jankūnas =

Lithuanian-American artist

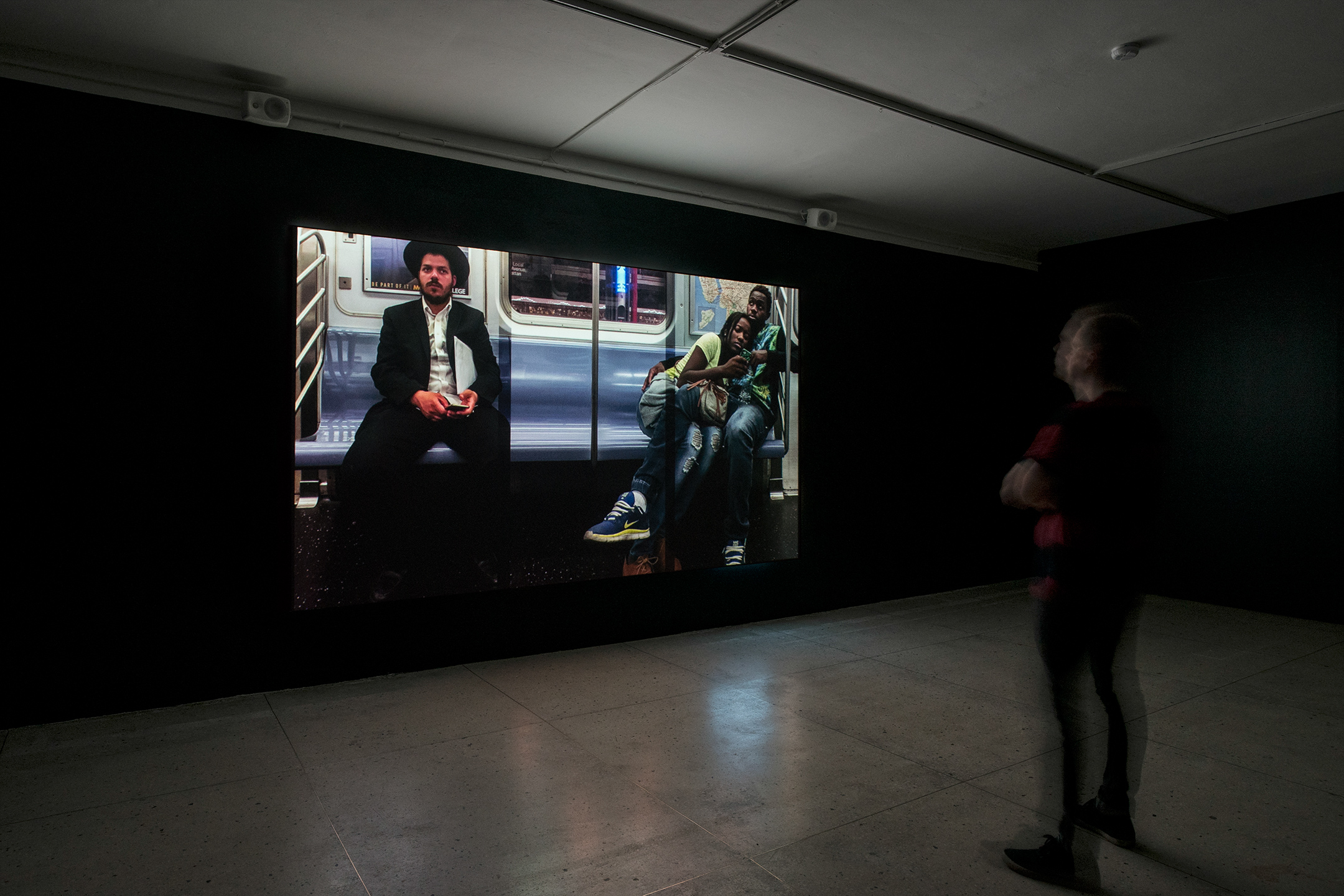
Vytenis Jankūnas - HD video installation called "J 2 Manhattan & Back 24-7-365 in HD Vol. 1" on display at Tallinn Art Hall in 2016, © Vytenis Jankūnas and Tallinn Art Hall, Photo: Karel Koplimets

Vytenis Jankūnas is a Lithuanian-American artist living and working in New York City. His work consists of photographs, paintings and mixed media works.

== Biography ==
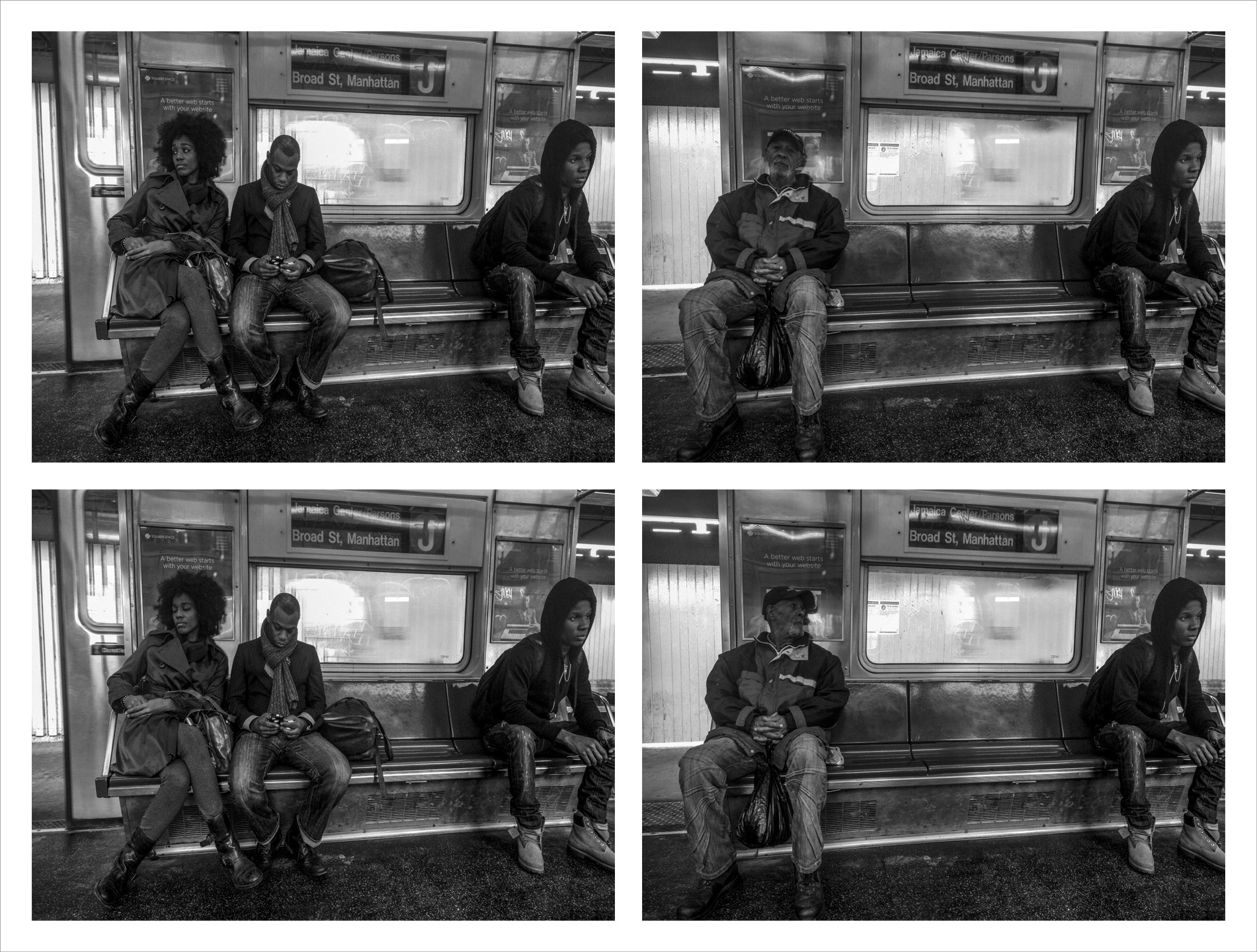
"J 2 Manhattan #004A" by Vytenis Jankūnas. C-print, or silver gelatin RC print on photo paper. © 2015 Vytenis Jankūnas.

Vytenis Jankūnas (born in 1961 in Kaunas, Lithuania) graduated from the National M. K. Čiurlionis School of Art in Vilnius (Lithuania). He received his MFA and BFA from Vilnius Academy of Arts, previously State Art Institute of Lithuania, in Vilnius (Lithuania). Vytenis Jankūnas became an assistant professor at State Art Institute of Lithuania, where he taught Studio Drawing. Vytenis Jankūnas is a visual artist who has shown in numerous group and solo exhibitions nationally and internationally, including "Buying time: Nourishing Excellence" at Sotheby's New Galleries in New York City; "Aujourdh’ui les Baltes," École nationale supérieure des Beaux-Arts, Paris (France); "Bread and Salt," Cornerhouse Gallery, Manchester (UK); "The Memory of Images. Baltic Photo Art Today," Stadtgalerie im Sophienhof, Kiel (Germany); Kunsthalle Rostock, Rostock (Germany); Exhibition Hall Latvija, Riga (Latvia); Exhibition Hall Nikolaj, Copenhagen (Denmark). Recent exhibits include one-man show "Stuck on the Train / Pakeleivis" at Contemporary Art Centre Vilnius (Lithuania), which was his second solo show in CAC Vilnius. He has been a recipient of the Fellowship award in the category of Painting from the New York Foundation for the Arts (Gregory Millard Fellowship), New York City (USA). Vytenis Jankūnas was awarded a residency at Nordic Arts Centre (HIAP), Helsinki (Finland) and grant of the Nordic Information Office, Vilnius (Lithuania). He has also received the grant of the Soros Center for Contemporary Arts, Vilnius (Lithuania) and The Annual State Grant for Young Artists provided by the Ministry of Culture of the Republic of Lithuania, Vilnius (Lithuania).

== Exhibitions ==
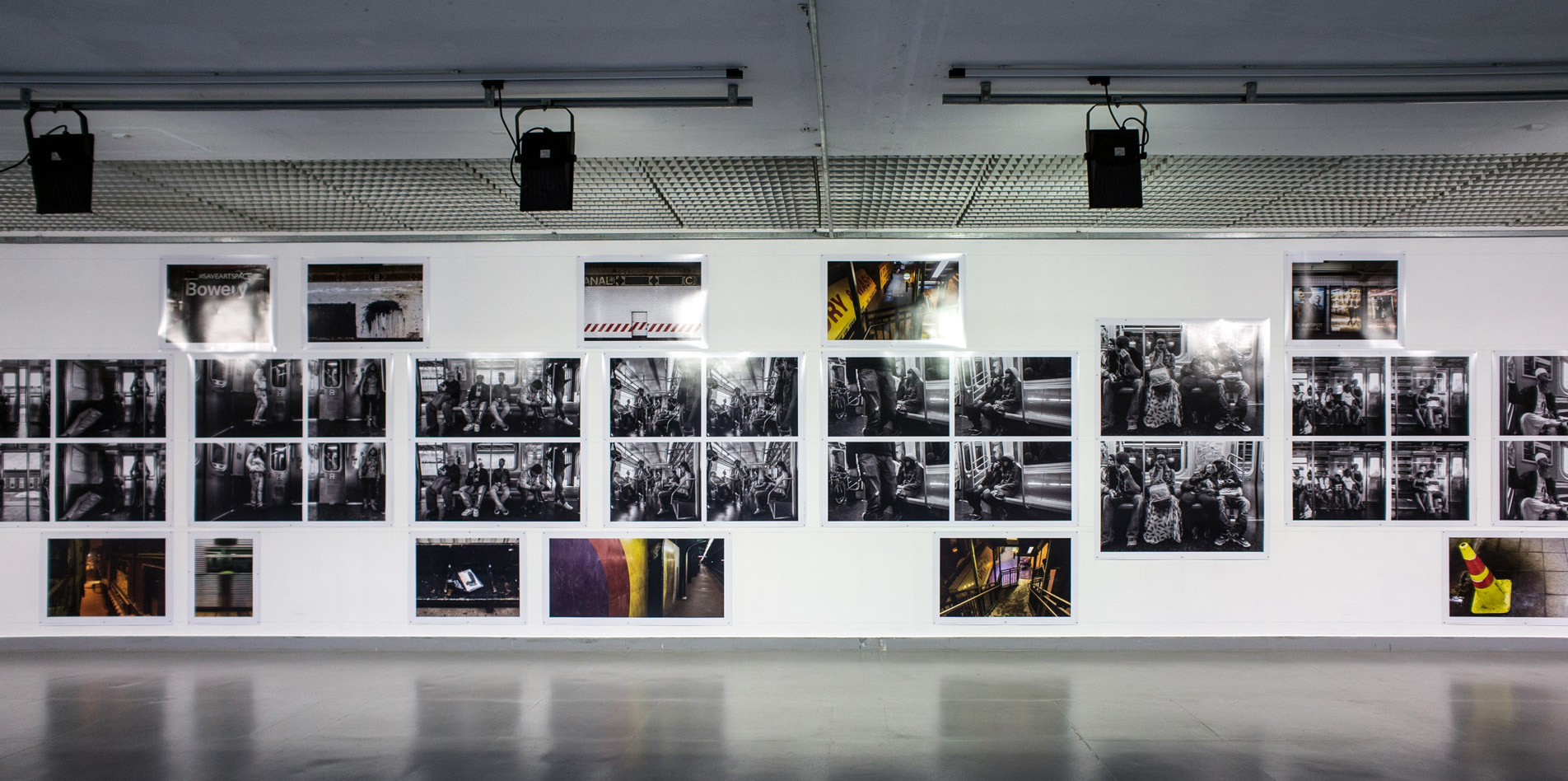
Vytenis Jankūnas – Stuck on the Train / Pakeleivis – Contemporary Art Centre, Vilnius – 2015, exhibition installation view. Photo: Vytenis Jankūnas. © 2015 Vytenis Jankūnas

=== Personal shows ===
- 2024 – "800 Portraits of the People I Don’t Know," SLA Art Space, New York City (USA).
- 2021 – "Nocturnal Creatures / Dance With Me," Prospekto Gallery, Vilnius (Lithuania).
- 2017 – "Stories from J 2 Manhattan," Undercurrent, New York City (USA).
- 2016 – "Rongis kin / Stuck on the Train," Art Hall Gallery, Tallinn (Estonia); "Stuck on the Train," Delegation of the European Union to the US, Washington, D.C. (USA); "Stuck on the Train," Consulate General of the Republic of Lithuania in New York (USA).
- 2015 – "Stuck on the Train / Pakeleivis," Contemporary Art Centre, Vilnius (Lithuania); "Stuck on the Train," Embassy of Lithuania in Washington, D.C. (USA).
- 2001 – "Where is My Fuckin’ Experience," Courthouse Gallery in Anthology Film Archives, New York, NY (USA); "Recent Prints," Gallery Kairė Dešnė, Vilnius (Lithuania).
- 1994 – "Bricks," Contemporary Art Centre, Vilnius (Lithuania).
- 1993 – "Pictures," Gallery Arka (Lithuania).
- 1992 – Gallery Arka, Vilnius (Lithuania), Catalogue.
- 1991 – Gallery Bokšto, Vilnius (Lithuania); Gallery Langas, Vilnius (Lithuania).

=== Selected group shows ===
- 2023/24 – "Try to make it real. But compared to what?: Contemporary Art from Lithuania," MOCAK (Museum of Contemporary Art in Krakow). Krakow (Poland).
- 2022 – "Parallel Time," Vytautas Kasiulis Museum of Art. Vilnius (Lithuania).
- 2022 – "Collecting Hits. Artworks and Soundtracks From the Collection of the Lewben Art Foundation," Klaipėda Cultural Communication Center. Klaipėda (Lithuania).
- 2020 – "Living in The Negative Space" at the "Art Vilnius'20" Special Projects program. Vilnius (Lithuania).
- 2019 – "In Other Places II," Kaunas Photography Gallery. Kaunas (Lithuania).
- 2018 – "In Other Places II," Prospekto Gallery. Vilnius (Lithuania).
- 2017 – "J 2 Manhattan & Back 24-7-365 in HD" at the "Art Vilnius '17" Special Projects program. Vilnius (Lithuania); "From Realism to the Object. Lithuanian World Art in the Collection of the Lithuanian Expatriate Art Foundation." Vytautas Kasiulis Art Museum, Vilnius (Lithuania).
- 2016 – FestArte Video Art Festival "Global Migration." ON ART Space in Testaccio, Rome (Italy); "Random Rapid Heartbeats. Selected projects from the CAC Vilnius programme." Tallinn Art Hall, Tallinn (Estonia), Catalogue; "From Realism to the Object. Lithuanian World Art in the Collection of the Lithuanian Expatriate Art Foundation." M. Žilinskas Art Gallery of M. K. Čiurlionis National Art Museum, Kaunas (Lithuania).
- 2012 – "Occupy!," Governor's Galleries on Governors Island, New York, NY (USA).
- 2010 – "Independent Drawing Gig Nr 6," Fluxus ministerija, Vilnius (Lithuania).
- 2008 – "Independent Drawing Gig Nr 4," Artbreak Gallery, Brooklyn, NY (USA).
- 2007 – "Independent Drawing Gig Nr 3," Quartair Contemporary Art Initiatyves, the Hague (Netherlands).
- 2006 – "101.3 KM – Competition and Cooperation," Contemporary Art Centre, Vilnius (Lithuania), Catalogue.
- 2006 – "Naujos Kaukes," Kaunas Picture Gallery, Kaunas (Lithuania).
- 2002 – "City Spotting", Gallery Arteritorija, Kaunas (Lithuania); "Jazzy Print," M. K. Čiurlionis National Art Museum, Kaunas (Lithuania), Catalogue.
- 2001 – "Buying time: Nourishing Excellence," Sotheby's New Galleries, New York (USA), Catalogue; "Traditionen I Dag," Väsby Kontshall, (Sweden), Catalogue; "Mutating Image," 12th Tallinn Print Triennial, Tallinn Art Hall, Tallinn (Estonia), Catalogue.
- 2000 – "Painterly," The 11th Vilnius Painting Triennial, Contemporary Art Centre, Vilnius (Lithuania), Catalogue; "Tradition and Future," Contemporary Art Centre, Vilnius (Lithuania), Catalogue.
- 1999 – "Lithuanian Art 1989-1999: The Ten Years," Contemporary Art Centre, Vilnius (Lithuania), Catalogue.
- 1998 – "From Outside to the Side," Kloster Bentlage, Rheine; Villa Weiner, Ochtrup (Germany), Catalogue.
- 1996 – "Bread and Salt," Cornerhouse Gallery, Manchester (Great Britain), Catalogue.
- 1995 – "Bread and Salt," Edinburgh College of Art, Edinburgh (Great Britain), Catalogue; "Lithuanian Art: 1995," Contemporary Art Centre, Vilnius (Lithuania), Catalogue.
- 1994 – "Order of Presence," MUUry Gallery, Helsinki (Finland); Gallery Jutempus, Vilnius (Lithuania); "Bread and Salt," Contemporary Art Centre, Vilnius (Lithuania), Catalogue; "The Memory of Images. Baltic Photo Art Today", The State Academy of Fine Arts, Gdansk (Poland); Contemporary Art Centre, Vilnius (Lithuania); Berlinische Galerie – Martin Gropius Bau, Berlin (Germany), Catalogue.
- 1993 – "Aujourd'hui les baltes," École nationale supérieure des Beaux-Arts, Paris (France), Catalogue; "Art MIF-93," Central Exhibition Hall Manege, Moscow (Russia), Catalogue.
- 1993 – 9th Vilnius Triennial of Painting, Contemporary Art Centre, Vilnius (Lithuania), Catalogue; "The Memory of Images. Baltic Photo Art Today," Stadtgalerie im Sophienhof, Kiel (Germany); Kunsthalle Rostock, Rostock (Germany); Exhibition Hall Latvija, Riga (Latvia); Exhibition Hall Nikolaj, Copenhagen (Denmark), Catalogue.
- 1992 – "False Art," Contemporary Art Centre, Vilnius (Lithuania); 1st Exhibition of "Group 1," Gallery Arka, Vilnius (Lithuania); 2nd Exhibition of "Group 1," Contemporary Art Centre, Vilnius (Lithuania); "Pornography," Contemporary Art Centre, Vilnius (Lithuania); "New Wild," Oriental Arts Center Ltd., Hong Kong; "Paintings on Paper," IFA, Schwerinsches Palais, Berlin (Germany), Catalogue.
- 1989 – National Exhibition of Young Lithuanian Artists, Kaunas Picture Gallery, Kaunas (Lithuania); "Young Lithuanian Artists," Szentendre Gallery, Szentendre (Hungary), Catalogue.
- 1988 – 4th Exhibition of Young Baltic Artists "Youth 88," Art Exhibition Palace, Vilnius (Lithuania), Catalogue.
- 1989 – National Art Exhibition, Art Exhibition Palace, Vilnius (Lithuania).
- 1987 – National Exhibition of Young Lithuanian Artists, Art Exhibition Palace, Vilnius (Lithuania), Catalogue.
- 1986 – National Exhibition of Young Lithuanian Artists, Kaunas Picture Gallery, Kaunas (Lithuania).

== Selected bibliography ==
- Dance With Me. Book concept and photography by Vytenis Jankūnas, Noewe Foundation (former Lewben Art Foundation), Vilnius 2021.
- Readdressed 2. Lithuanian and Litvak Graphics, Sculpture, Photography, Contemporary Art in the Lithuanian Expatriate Art Foundation. Noewe Foundation (former Lewben Art Foundation), Vilnius 2017.
- '17—1 Lietuvos Fotografija / Lithuanian Photography. Lietuvos fotomeninkų sąjunga, Vilnius 2017;
- ŠMC / CAC 2007 - 2017. Šiuolaikinio meno centras / Contemporary Art Centre, Vinius, 2017;
- Art Vilnius '17, Contemporary Art Fair. Lithuanian Art Gallerists’ Association, 2017, Vilnius. Catalogue;
- Random Rapid Heartbeats. Selected projects from the CAC Vilnius programme. 2016.10.22-12.04, Contemporary Art Centre, Vilnius 2016, Catalogue;
- Art Vilnius '16, Contemporary Art Fair. Lithuanian Art Gallerists’ Association, 2016, Vilnius. Catalogue;
- ŠMC – 15 metų / CAC 15 years. Šiuolaikinio meno centras / Contemporary Art Centre, Vinius, 2007;
- 101,3 KM. Šiuolaikinio meno centras, 2006. Katalogas;
- Pažymėtos teritorijos. Tyto Alba, Vilnius 2005;
- Buying time: Nourishing Excellence. June 19 – July 2, 2001. Sotheby's, New York. Catalogue;
- Traditionen I Dag. Väsby Konsthall. 2001/04/14 – 05/13. Catalogue; Tradicija ir ateitis / Tradition and Future, Vilnius, 2000 10 06 – 11 12. Katalogas;
- 100 Contemporary Lithuanian Artists. Soros Center for Contemporary Arts in Lithuania. 2000.R. Paknys Publishing House, 2000;
- Tapybiška. 11-oji Vilniaus tapybos trienalė, Išleido Šiuolaikinio meno centras, 2000. Katalogas;
- 8. Kunstmarkt Dresden 1999, Ausstellungskatalog; Lithuanian Art 1989–1999: The Ten Years. Contemporary Art Centre, Vilnius, September 10 – October 24, 1999. Catalogue;
- Lietuviu skulptura 1940–1990 Lietuvos dailes muziejaus rinkiniuose. Katalogas / Catalogue. Lithuanian Sculpture 1940-1990 Collections of the Lithuanian Museum of Art. Lietuvos dailes muziejus. Vilnius, 1998;
- From Outside to the Side. Kulturforum Rheine e. V. Kunstakademie Vilnius. Vilnius, 1998. Catalogue;
- Skulptura 1975–1990. Aidai, Vilnius, 1997;
- Guide Apollonia. Art contemporain de l’Europe centrale et orientale / Contemporary Art of Central and Eastern Europe. Frac Alsace, Editions du Counseil de l’Europe. Srasbourg, 1997;
- Beyond Freedom. New York, 1996; Lietuvos daile ’97 / galerijos pristato / Art in Lithuania ’97 / Galeries Present. Vilnius, 1997;
- 1995: Lietuvos daile / 1995: Art in Lithuania. Vilnius, 1995. Catalogue;
- Duona ir druska / Bread and Salt. SSMC Lietuvoje, Berlin, 1994. Catalogue;
- IX Vilniaus tapybos trienale / IXth Vilnius Painting Triennial. Vilnius, 1993. Katalogas;
- Das Gedachtnis der Bilder. Baltische Photokunst heute / The memory of Images. Baltic Photo Art Today. Stadtgalerie Kiel, Nieswand Verlag, Kiel, 1993. Catalogue;
- Aujourd’hui les Baltes. Art Contemporain d’Estonie, Lettonie, Lituanie. Paris, 1993. Catalogue;
- Moscow International Art Fair "Art MIF-93." Art MIF publishers, Moscow, 1993. Catalogue;
- Litauische Malerei auf Papier. IFA, Berlin. 1992. Katalog;
- Granito skulpturos kurybine stovykla. Klaipeda / Smiltyne. 1989/VI.15/VII.26. Katalogas. Klaipėda, 1989.

== Collections and Works in Public Areas ==
- Noewe Foundation (former Lewben Art Foundation), Vilnius (Lithuania);
- Modern Art Center (MMC), Vilnius (Lithuania);
- National Gallery of Art, Vilnius (Lithuania);
- M. K. Čiurlionis National Art Museum, Kaunas (Lithuania);
- Sculpture Park of City Klaipėda, Smiltynė / Klaipėda (Lithuania);
- Public Building in Druskininkai (Lithuania);
- State Cemetery, Vilnius (Lithuania);
- City of Vilnius (Lithuania).

Private collections in US, Germany, Sweden, Hong Kong, France and Canada.
