= Vytenis (name) =

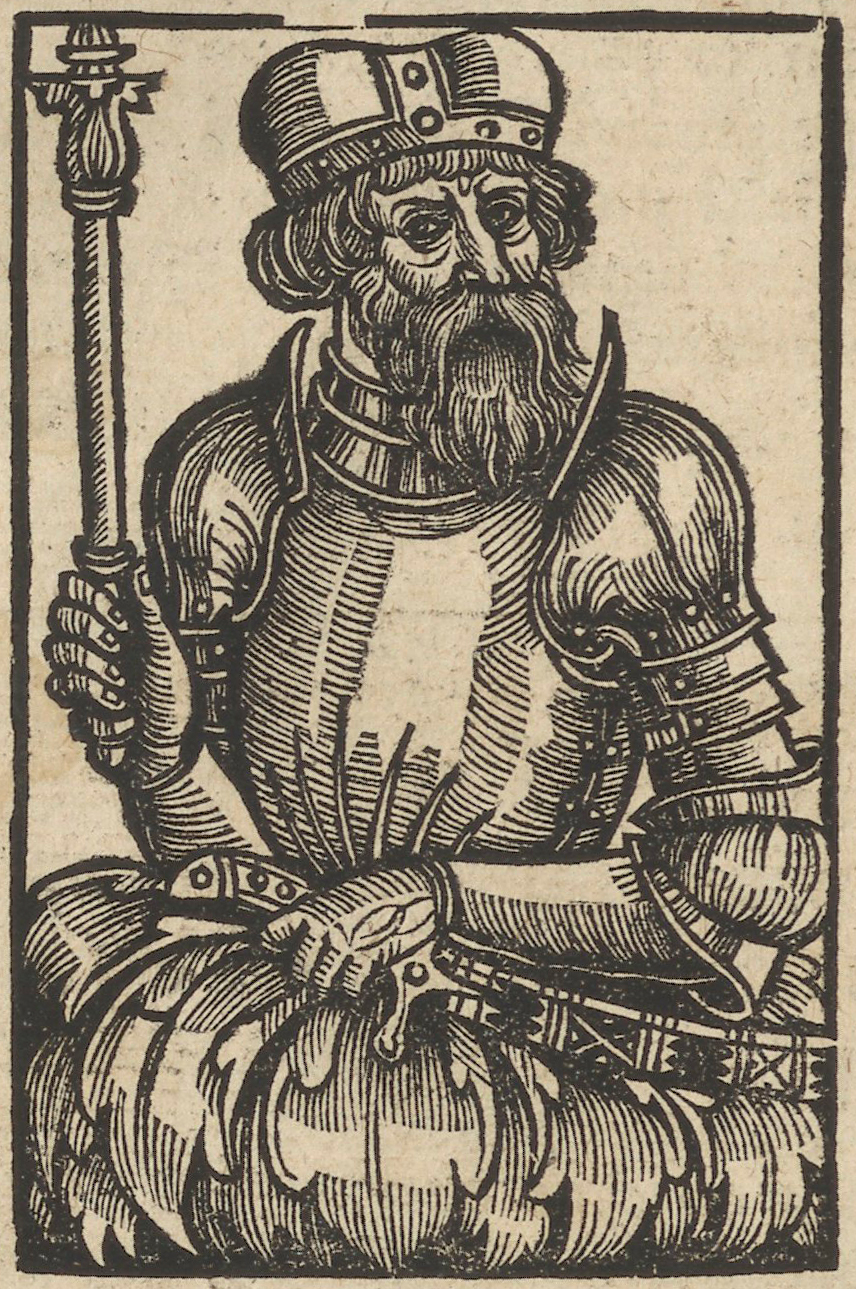
- Grand Duke of Lithuania Vytenis
- Gender: Male
- Name day: 3 April

Origin
- Region of origin: Lithuania

Vytenis is a Lithuanian masculine given name. People with the name Vytenis include:

- Vytenis (1260–1316), Grand Duke of Lithuania from c.1295 to c.1316
- Vytenis Andriukaitis (born 1951), Lithuanian European Commissioner, heart surgeon, and co-signatory to the 1990 Act of the Re-Establishment of the State of Lithuania
- Vytenis Čižauskas (born 1992), Lithuanian basketball player
- Vytenis Jankūnas (born 1961), Lithuanian-born American artist
- Vytenis Jasikevičius (born 1985), Lithuanian basketball player
- Vytenis Lipkevičius (born 1989), Lithuanian basketball player
- Vytenis Rimkus (born 1930), Lithuanian painter and encyclopedist
