= Jankūnas =

- Lithuanian surname
- m.: Jankūnas
- f.: (unmarried): Jankūnaitė
- f.: (married): Jankūnienė

Jankūnas is a Lithuanian surname. Jankūnas, Jankunas or Jankūnaitė may refer to:

- Angelė Rupšienė (born 1952), née Jankūnaitė, Lithuanian retired basketball player
- Julieta Jankunas (born 1999), Argentine field hockey player
- Paulius Jankūnas (born 1984), Lithuanian basketball player
- Vytenis Jankūnas (born 1961), Lithuanian-American visual artist
