= Stauskas =

- Lithuanian surname
- m.: Stauskas
- f.: (unmarried): Stauskaitė
- f.: (married): Stauskienė
- Related names: Stawski

Stauskas is a Lithuanian surname. Notable people with the surname include:

- Juan Stauskas (born 1939), Argentine football player
- Nik Stauskas (born 1993), Canadian basketball player
- Petras Stauskas
