= All Through the Night =

All Through the Night may refer to:

== Albums ==
- All Through the Night (The Sand Band album), 2011
- All Through the Night: Julie London Sings the Choicest of Cole Porter, 1965

== Songs ==
- "All Through the Night" (folk song) or "Ar Hyd y Nos", a Welsh folk song
- "All Through the Night" (Cole Porter song), 1934
- "All Through the Night" (Jules Shear song), 1983; covered by Cyndi Lauper, 1983
- "All Through the Night" (Tone Lōc song), 1991
- "All Through the Night", by Donna Summer from Bad Girls
- "All Through the Night", by Gentle Giant from Civilian
- "All Through the Night", by Joanne Accom from Do Not Disturb
- "All Through the Night", by Kasabian from For Crying Out Loud
- "All Through the Night", by Raspberries from Starting Over
- "All Through the Night", by Lou Reed from The Bells

== Other uses ==
- All Through the Night (film), a 1942 American thriller directed by Vincent Sherman
- All Through the Night (Žmuidzinavičius), a 1906 painting by Antanas Žmuidzinavičius
- All Through the Night, a 1998 novel by Mary Higgins Clark
- All Through the Night, a 2007 novel by Suzanne Brockmann

== See also ==
- "All Thru the Nite", a song by P.O.V. and Jade
