= Petras Stauskas =

- Born: 20 June 1919; Talovka, Russian SFSR
- Died: 28 February 2003 (aged 83); Kaunas, Lithuania
- Burial place: Petrašiūnai Cemetery
- Education: Vilnius Academy of Arts
- Occupations: Artist, museum director
- Employer: M. K. Čiurlionis National Art Museum

Petras Stauskas (20 June 1919 – 28 February 2003) was a Lithuanian artist and long-term director of the M. K. Čiurlionis National Art Museum (1951–1988).

As a student at the present-day Vilnius Academy of Arts, Stauskas was arrested during the June deportation in 1941. He was released from the Gulag when it became clear that he was confused with another man by the same name. He then joined the Lithuanian 16th Rifle Division and was injured fighting to retake Lithuania. In 1946, he resumed his studies and graduated in 1950.

In 1951, he was appointed director of the M. K. Čiurlionis National Art Museum. He quietly resisted Sovietization efforts: he employed former political prisoners and safeguarded various politically unacceptable exhibits. He also worked to expand the museum and open branches in Druskininkai and Jurbarkas as well as specialized Žmuidzinavičius Museum and Ceramics Museum in Kaunas. He was dismissed from the museum in March 1988.

== Biography ==
=== Early life and education ===
Petras Stauskas was born 20 June 1919 in Talovka, Novouzensky District. His great-grandparents were deported from Lithuania to the Samara Governorate for participating in the anti-Russian Uprising of 1863. His great-grandmother Rožė Stauskaitė was the love interest of the poet Antanas Vienažindys. In 1922, the family returned to Lithuania and settled in their original village of Jaskoniškės near Dusetos where Stauskas attended a primary school. He further studied at the progymnasium in Antalieptė and gymnasium in Rokiškis.

He graduated in 1939 and enrolled at the aspirant courses at the War School of Kaunas. There he was classmate with painter Algirdas Petrulis. At the same time, he enrolled at the Kaunas Art School. After the Soviet occupation of Lithuania in 1940, the War School relocated to Vilnius. As a result, Stauskas transferred to the Vilnius Art School (present-day Vilnius Academy of Arts) where his teachers included Viktoras Vizgirda and Jonas Šileika.

=== World War II ===
Stauskas was arrested and deported during the June deportation in 1941. He reached Sevurallag in November 1941 where he was forced to work cutting down trees and processing timber. For a time, his bunkmate was painter Adomas Smetona (nephew of President Antanas Smetona). NKVD officials started investigation in 1942 and in March 1943 determined that they had the wrong person – they were looking for the policeman Povilas Petras Stauskas and not student Petras Stauskas. Student Stauskas was released from the Gulag, while policeman Stauskas was arrested in 1946.

For a few months, he worked at a tank factory in Nizhny Tagil before joining the Lithuanian 16th Rifle Division of the Red Army. He fought with the division and helped Soviets retake Lithuania until he was injured near Katyčiai. After recuperating, he was deployed to Manchuria where the Soviet Union was preparing to fight against Japan.

=== Museum director ===
Stauskas was demobilized in 1946. He returned to Vilnius and resumed his education at Vilnius Academy of Arts where his teachers included Justinas Vienožinskis, Vladas Drėma, Petras Aleksandravičius, Antanas Gudaitis. He graduated in 1950 and joined the Communist Party of the Soviet Union. In March 1951, we was appointed as the director of the M. K. Čiurlionis National Art Museum. He held this position until he was fired by the Minister of Culture Jonas Bielinis on 15 March 1988. Reportedly, he was dismissed because he protested plans to relocate the museum for its historical premises so that the War Museum could expand.

As museum director, Stauskas quietly resisted Sovietization efforts. Using his reputation as a war hero, he employed and protected former political prisoners or deportees who managed to return to Lithuania but struggled finding employment. According to witnesses, he even had a secret hand signal to warn employees if a KGB agent came to visit the museum. Stauskas also hid and protected from destruction various politically unacceptable items from the interwar Lithuania (for example, a set of Lithuanian state orders, property of coin mint, sport awards, memorabilia of various institutions and societies) or religious items (for example, wooden folk sculptures of Jesus or saints). He also acquired new art that did not comply with the official requirements of Soviet ideology. He worked to preserve original interiors of Pažaislis Monastery and Church of St. Michael the Archangel, Kaunas.

During his tenure, the museum opened subsidiary museums: a branch in Druskininkai (1963), Vincas Grybas museum in Jurbarkas (1960), Žmuidzinavičius Museum (1966) and Ceramics Museum (1978) in Kaunas.

Stauskas died on 28 February 2003 in Kaunas and was buried at the Petrašiūnai Cemetery.

== Works ==
Stauskas mainly created watercolors, but also painted in oil. His subjects were mainly landscapes (particularly of Kaunas and his native village) and portraits. His paintings usually feature limited and restrained colors that help convey emotion and person's character. He drew objects in a generalized fashion, departing from realism but not reaching abstraction. He created landscapes quickly, impulsively with free brushstrokes. He also painted Soviet-themed scenes, for example celebrations of the October Revolution and presidium of the People's Seimas.

He held individual exhibitions in Kaunas in 1964, 1969, 1979, 1985, and 1999. He was recognized as Merited Artist of the Lithuanian SSR in 1965.
