= Stavsky =

Stavsky, also Stavskiy, Stavskii, Stavskij (Russian: Ставский) (feminine: Stavskaya, Stavskaia, Stavskaja) is a Russian surname, a Russified form of the Polish Stawski. Notable people with the surname include:

- Abraham Stavsky, Belarusian Jewish activist member of Betar
- Faina Stavskaya (1890–1937), Belarusian Jewish revolutionary
- Vladimir Stavsky, Soviet writer
