= Viktoras Vizgirda =

Lithuanian artist

Viktoras Vizgirda (January 1, 1904 – July 10, 1993) was a Lithuanian painter. He is mostly known for landscapes and still life, but he also did portraits.

== Biography ==
Vizgirda was born at the Dominikoniai farm in Garliava volost, Lithuania, then part of the Russian Empire. His father, Jonas Vizgirda, was a farmer and surveyor. In 1914, during World War I, after the farm was destroyed and his father died, he and his mother moved to Kaunas.

In 1926, he graduated from the Kaunas Art School and from 1926 to 1927 he continued his education in Paris, where he became acquainted with the works of French modernists Paul Cézanne, Raoul Dufy, Henri Matisse, André Derain. From 1928 to 1933, he taught in high schools. From 1934 to 1940, he taught at the First Kaunas School of Crafts (Lithuanian: Kauno I amatų mokykla). From 1936 to 1938, he was the chairman of the Union of Lithuanian Artists. From 1941 to 1943, he was the director of the Vilnius Academy of Arts.

In 1944, he emigrated to the West and lived in Vienna, Tübingen, and Berlin. From 1946 to 1949 he worked at the School of Arts and Crafts (Werkkunstschule) in Freiburg. In 1947 he took part in the founding of the Institute of Lithuanian Art in Freiburg and became the first chairman of its board.

In 1950 he emigrated to the United States, where he lived in Dorchester, Boston. He died in Cape Cod, Massachusetts.

== Works ==
His paintings were mostly influenced by his teacher, Justinas Vienožinskis at the Kaunas Art School, as well as by French Post-Impressionism.

Since 1930 he had personal exhibitions in the West and in Lithuania, also posthumously.

In museums, his works are owned by the Lithuanian National Museum of Art, the M. K. Čiurlionis National Art Museum, the Samogitian Alka Museum in Telšiai, the Aušra Museum in Šiauliai and in museums outside Lithuania.
