= Paulius Galaunė =

Lithuanian art historian, museum curator and graphic artist

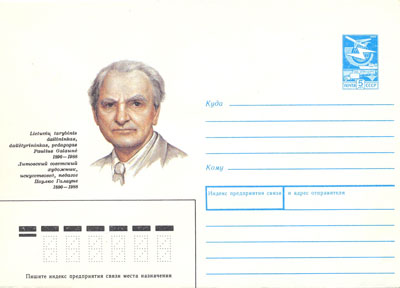
Memorial postal cover issued by Lietuvos paštas 1989

Paulius Galaunė (January 25, 1890 in Pagelažiai near Ukmergė – October 18, 1988 in Kaunas) was a Lithuanian art historian, museum curator, and graphic artist. He was one of the first professional museum curators in Lithuania and was well-published on topics of Lithuanian folk art. The apartment of Galaunė and his wife Adelė Nezabitauskaitė, an opera singer, was converted into the Galaunė Family Museum in 1995, and contains his personal belongings as well as his works. It is part of the M. K. Čiurlionis National Art Museum. He was buried in Petrašiūnai Cemetery.

== Career ==
Between 1910 and 1913, Galaunė studied at the Institute of Psychoneurology in University of St. Petersburg. He studied art in St. Petersburg (Drawing School of the Imperial Society for the Encouragement of the Arts) and Moscow. In 1914 he worked at Aušrinė magazine. Upon return to Lithuania in 1918, he worked the National Museum of Lithuania until 1923, when he took an internship at the Louvre to study museology. In 1924 he was appointed as director of the M. K. Čiurlionis Gallery. He remained at the post until 1949, overseeing its transformation into the Vytautas the Great Museum in 1936 and M. K. Čiurlionis Art Museum in 1944. As the museum director, he brought back dispersed works of M. K. Čiurlionis to house them in a specialized museum. Galaunė was also a member of the State Commission of Archaeology from 1919–1925 and 1930–1936. He organized folk art exhibitions in Italy (1925), France (1927), Sweden, Norway, Denmark (1931). He taught at the University of Lithuania (1925–1939), Vilnius University (1940–1946), and Vilnius Academy of Art (1945–1950).

== Works ==
As an artist, Galaunė created graphics, book covers and illustrations, headpieces, bookplates. His works often featured fantastic content and had secessionist features. He also collected, studies, systemized folk and professional art. One of his most important academic works, Lietuvių liaudies menas (Lithuanian Folk Art), was published in 1930. The book, co-authored with Justinas Vienožinskis, was translated into French and Swedish. Another major publication was a six-volume album Lietuvių liaudies menas (1956–1968). Galaunė also prepared and published albums of works of medieval paintings (1926), Lithuanian wood carvers (1927), M. K. Čiurlionis (1927), Mečislovas Bulaka (1936), Adomas Galdikas (1969).

== Awards ==
Galaunė received the following awards:

- Lithuanian Order of Vytautas the Great (1931)
- Latvian Order of the Three Stars (1938)
- Swedish Order of Vasa (1938)
- French Legion of Honour (1939)
- Belgian Order of Leopold II
- National Prize of the Lithuanian SSR (1970)
