= Antanas Žmuidzinavičius =

Lithuanian painter and art collector

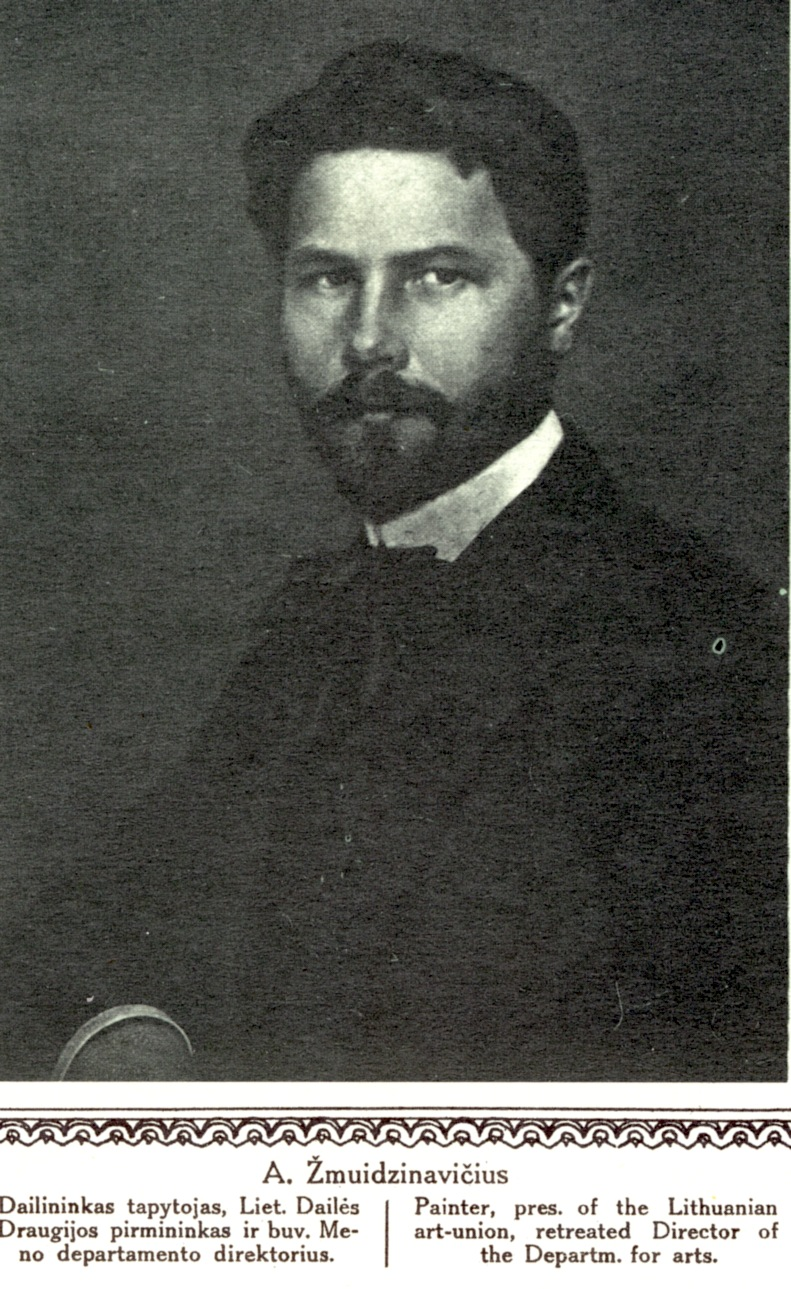
- Žmuidzinavičius in Lithuania Album (1921)
- Born: 31 October 1876; Seirijai, Congress Poland, Russian Empire (now Lithuania)
- Died: 9 August 1966 (aged 89); Kaunas, Lithuanian SSR
- Resting place: Petrašiūnai Cemetery
- Education: Veiveriai Teachers' Seminary; Académie Colarossi; Académie Vitti
- Board member of: Vilnius Art Society; Lithuanian Art Society

Antanas Žmuidzinavičius (Polish: Antoni Żmujdzinowicz, 31 October 1876 – 9 August 1966) was a Lithuanian painter and art collector.

Educated at the Veiveriai Teachers' Seminary, Žmuidzinavičius worked as a teacher while pursuing art education in the evenings in Warsaw. He further studied at the Académie Colarossi and Académie Vitti in Paris. In 1906, he returned to Lithuania and organized the First Exhibition of Lithuanian Art and the Lithuanian Art Society which he chaired. He also established the Vilnius Art Society which united artists of different nationalities. In 1908–1909 and 1921–1924, he toured western Europe and the United States. In 1919–1921 and 1924–1966, he lived and worked in Kaunas. He worked to collect, preserve, and properly exhibit works of Mikalojus Konstantinas Čiurlionis as well as to establish the Vytautas the Great War Museum. He participated in the Lithuanian Wars of Independence and was a founding member of the Lithuanian Riflemen's Union. He was chairman of the Riflemen's Union as well as chief editor of its magazine Trimitas from 1929 until 1934. Žmuidzinavičius taught drawing at the Kaunas Art School (renamed to Kaunas Institute of Applied and Decorative Arts in 1941 and State Art Institute of Lithuania in 1951) in 1926–1953 and at the Kaunas Polytechnic Institute in 1953–1966. He was recognized as the People's Painter of the USSR in 1957.

Žmuidzinavičius created more than 2,000 pieces of art and is best known for his landscapes that create a sense of longing. He also created portraits of famous people, scenes of everyday life, religious imagery. He also helped design the modern flag of Lithuania, created a version of the coat of arms of Lithuania that was widely used during the interwar period, designed postage stamps and Lithuanian currency banknotes. Žmuidzinavičius was an avid collector. He donated his collections to the M. K. Čiurlionis National Art Museum in 1961 which opened the Žmuidzinavičius Museum in his former home in 1966. His collection of devils outgrew the museum and was moved to the dedicated annexe in 1982. Two other small museums are dedicated to him in Seirijai where he was born and in Balkūnai where he grew up.

== Biography ==
=== Before World War I ===
Žmuidzinavičius was born in Seirijai, then part of Congress Poland, a client state of the Russian Empire, in 1876. After less than two years, his parents bought a farm and moved to Balkūnai near Alytus. His father participated in the Uprising of 1863 and served a prison sentence in the Sejny prison. His parents had eleven children, but only two daughters and three sons reached adulthood. In 1890–1894, he studied at the Veiveriai Teachers' Seminary. After the graduation, he taught at Polish rural schools in Zawady and Waniewo. There he started drawing with pencils and writing his first poetry in Polish and Lithuanian. In 1899, he managed to get a transfer to Warsaw. He continued to work as a teacher while studying painting at private courses of Wojciech Gerson as well as an evening art school (director Evgeny Alexandrovich Zolotarev). Žmuidzinavičius' works were first exhibited at the gallery of Aleksander Krywult in 1902 and at the Zachęta gallery in 1904. He also established contacts with other Lithuanian artists in Warsaw, including Mikalojus Konstantinas Čiurlionis and Petras Rimša. In 1903, he passed the examinations at the Imperial Academy of Arts to become a high school art teacher and obtained a better job at a gymnasium. However, he continued to pursue education and departed to Paris in December 1904. He studied at the Académie Colarossi and Académie Vitti as well as at the study of Hermenegildo Anglada Camarasa. He also joined a small Lithuanian student group chaired by his future wife odontologist Marija Putvinskaitė. They married on 10 October 1909 in a ceremony officiated by Juozas Tumas-Vaižgantas and witnessed by Jonas Basanavičius and Ona Vileišienė, wife of Petras Vileišis.

In 1906, he returned to Lithuania and settled in Vilnius. In November 1906, he played the role of krivių krivaitis (chief pagan priest) Lizdeika in the first Lithuanian opera Birutė staged bye the Kanklės of Vilnius Society. Together with others, he organized the First Exhibition of Lithuanian Art at the Vileišis Palace and was later elected chairman of the Lithuanian Art Society. In 1908, he established the Vilnius Art Society which was joined by Polish, Russian, and Jewish artists, including Marianne von Werefkin, Bolesław Bałzukiewicz, Bolesław Buyko, Ber Zalkind, Lev Antokolski (1872–1942), Ivan Rybakov (1870–1942). In 1908, he went on a tour of Western Europe (Munich, Dresden, Florence, Rome, Naples) and United States. He continued to study art, visit museums and galleries, and paint. In Munich, he lived for four months with Petras Kalpokas. In the United States, he delivered lectures on Lithuanian art and history to various communities of Lithuanian Americans and collected funds for the planned National House by the Lithuanian Scientific Society. In Chicago, he created backdrops for the local Lithuanian theatres. Upon his return to Lithuania, Žmuidzinavičius worked to collect and exhibit works of Mikalojus Konstantinas Čiurlionis who died of pneumonia in 1911. In 1912, he studied fresco painting in Hamburg. In May 1914, Žmuidzinavičius together with zoologist Tadas Ivanauskas traveled to the White Sea and painted arctic landscapes.

=== Interwar ===
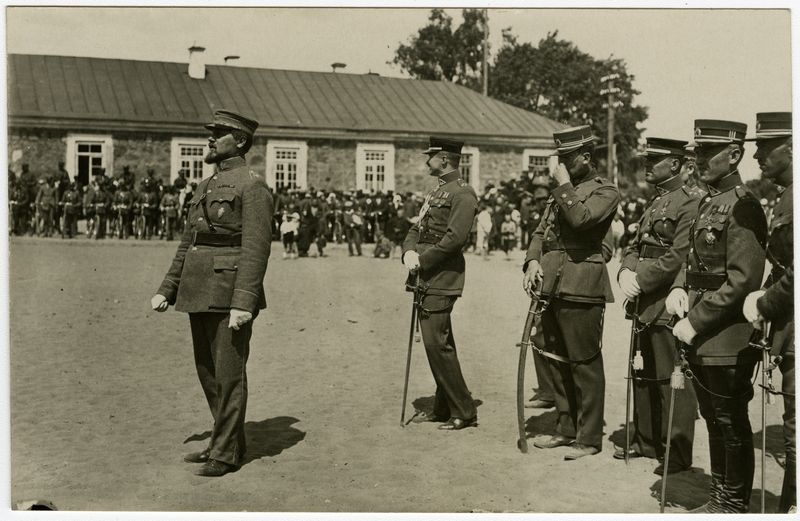
Žmuidzinavičius leads riflemen's celebration in 1930

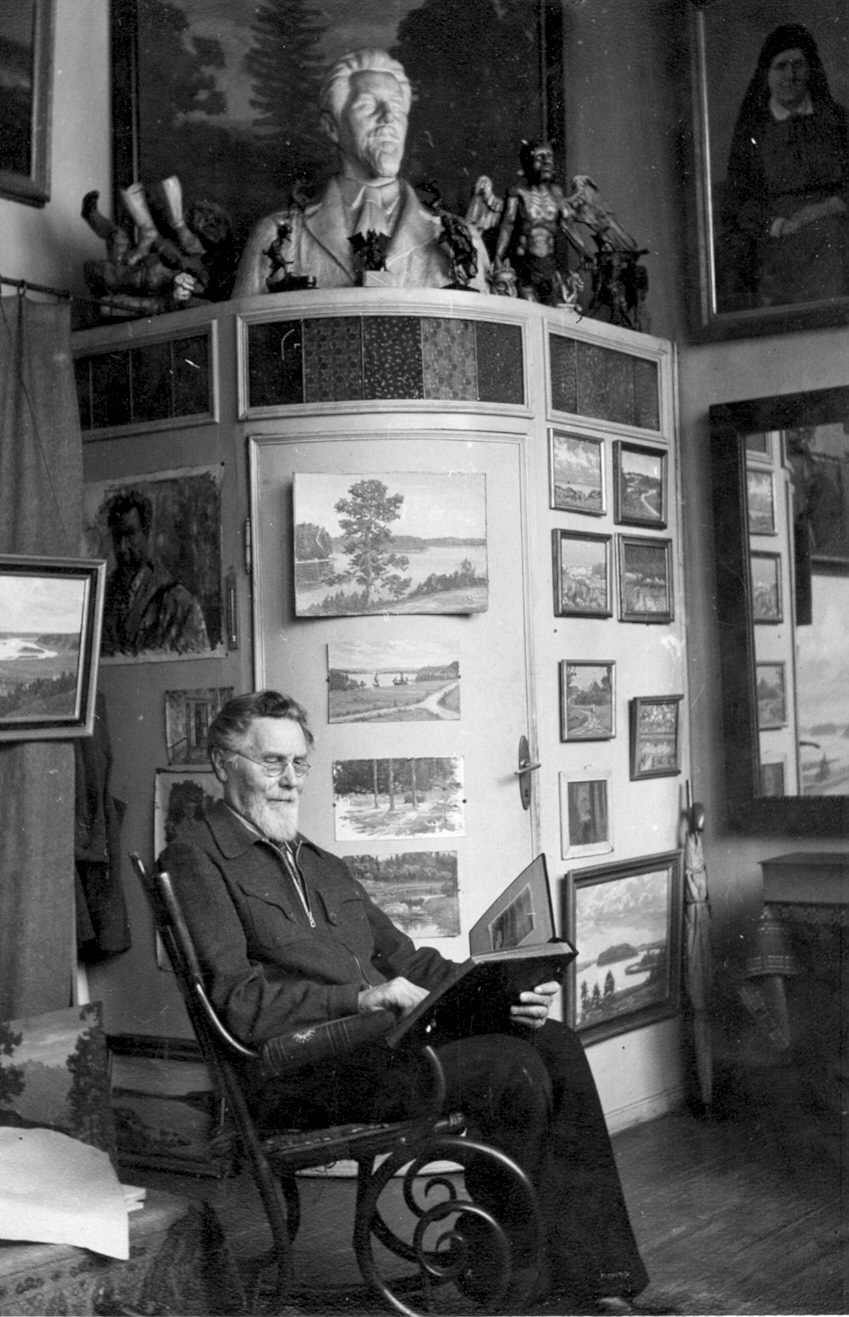
Žmuidzinavičius at his home in 1954

During World War I, Žmuidzinavičius worked as a teacher at the newly established Lithuanian courses for teachers and Lithuanian Rytas Gymnasium. He joined the Lithuanian Society for the Relief of War Sufferers and for a time headed an orphanage in Šnipiškės. In 1917, he worked at Lietuvos aidas and helped organize Vilnius Conference (designed tickets, decorated the meeting hall, etc.). When Soviets captured Vilnius at the start of the Lithuanian–Soviet War in December 1918, Žmuidzinavičius established a commission that sought to collect and safeguard artworks in the city. In 1919–1921 and 1924–1966, he lived and worked in Kaunas. He recruited men to the Lithuanian Army during the Lithuanian War of Independence and was a founding member of the Lithuanian Riflemen's Union. He participated in Lithuanian defence against Poland during the Żeligowski's Mutiny and was captured near Babriškis but managed to escape after three days. He continued to care after the works of Mikalojus Konstantinas Čiurlionis and worked to organize a museum to house them. In February 1921, together with Juozas Tumas-Vaižgantas he was tasked with the establishment of the Vytautas the Great War Museum.

In July 1921, Žmuidzinavičius departed towards the United States but due to delays in getting appropriate travel documents, he reached the U.S. only in February 1922. The goal of the journey was to raise funds for the Lithuanian Riflemen and establish chapters of the union in various communities of Lithuanian Americans. Žmuidzinavičius organized about 200 meetings and lectures but Lithuanian Americans showed little interest in joining the Riflemen's Union. Due to the economic depression of 1920–1921 and competition from other organizations for the donations, the journey was not a financial success. He stopped representing the Riflemen's Union in November 1923 but remained in the United States until mid-1924 to pursue his artistic interests. He organized art exhibitions in Washington, DC and Chicago. Together with Aleksandras Račkus, he travelled across the western United States and exhibited works completed during the journey in New York. Upon his return, Žmuidzinavičius faced criticism of his handling of the collected funds. General Vincas Grigaliūnas-Glovackis submitted an official complaint to the Ministry of Defence in 1931. The unofficial investigation concluded only in 1936 and found that the funds were collected chaotically and haphazardly but did not find any evidence of misappropriation of the funds.

Between 1926 and 1953, Žmuidzinavičius taught drawing at the Kaunas Art School (renamed to Kaunas Institute of Applied and Decorative Arts in 1941 and State Art Institute of Lithuania in 1951). In 1926–1928, he was chairman of the revived Lithuanian Art Society. In 1929, after the death of his brother-in-law Vladas Putvinskis, he became chairman of the Lithuanian Riflemen's Union as well as chief editor of its magazine Trimitas. He resigned in November 1934. During his tenure, Žmuidzinavičius did not call the required annual meetings that were empowered to elect the new chairman and board. Overall, his tenure was criticized for poor financial management and bookkeeping irregularities as well as nepotism (his wife was the chair, the niece was the vice-chair, and sister-in-law was honorary chair of the women's section). His resignation was likely a result of a government investigation and impending military reforms initiated by Stasys Raštikis that militarized the union and subordinated it to the military. He was one of the founding members of the Lithuanian Artists' Association and briefly served as its chairman in 1940.

=== After World War II ===
Unlike many other members of the Lithuanian intelligentsia and Lithuanian Riflemen, Žmuidzinavičius was not repressed by the Soviet regime. His nephews-in-law Stasys Putvinskis (former Minister of Agriculture) and Vytautas Putvinskis died in Soviet prisons. Vytautas' mother, wife, and four children were deported to Ust-Lokchim. By 1945, only two children remained alive. With the help of Žmuidzinavičius, the two orphans were returned to Lithuania in November 1945. Žmuidzinavičius took in his grand-nephew Algis Pūtvis.

Žmuidzinavičius was recognized as a Honored Artist of the Lithuanian SSR in 1946 and as the People's Artist of the Lithuanian SSR in 1954 and of the Soviet Union in 1957. In 1947, Žmuidzinavičius was awarded the academic title of professor. He taught at the Kaunas Polytechnic Institute in 1953–1966. In 1958, he became a corresponding member of the Academy of Arts of the Soviet Union. In 1959–1963, he was elected to the Supreme Soviet of the Lithuanian SSR, a rubber-stamp institution of the Lithuanian Communist Party.

Žmuidzinavičius died in Kaunas in 1966 and was buried in the Petrašiūnai Cemetery.

== Works ==
=== Paintings ===
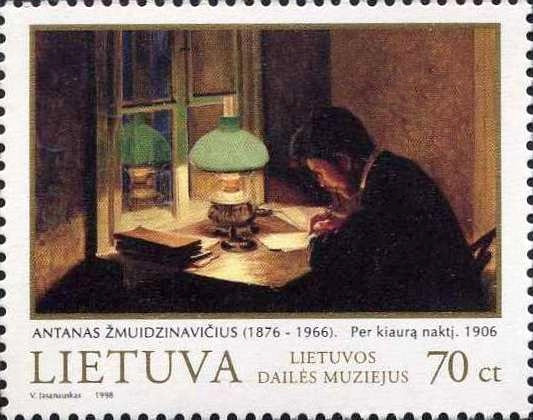
Painting All Through the Night by Žmuidzinavičius on a postal stamp issued in 1998

Žmuidzinavičius created more than 2,000 pieces of art, mostly oil paintings of landscapes but also portraits of famous people, scenes of everyday life, religious imagery. His paintings usually depict idealized and stylized nature scenes that create a melancholic mood and convey a particular longing. The main colors are soft, warm, and earthy. He conveys not only the beauty of nature but also the love and pride for his homeland. His paintings often depicted typical Lithuanian landscapes – shores of the Neman River, amber dunes of the Baltic Sea, hills of Samogitia, forests of Dzūkija, lakes of Aukštaitija, grain fields, or cozy and intimate corners of nature (e.g. lonely trees). Overall, Žmuidzinavičius' art has features of romanticism (interwar period) and realism (post-war period). He represented academism and rejected modernist experimentations.

He also created posters and book illustrations. His works are kept by various museums, including the Lithuanian National Museum of Art, Institute of Lithuanian Literature and Folklore, Vytautas the Great War Museum, Tretyakov Gallery in Moscow, and Moscow State University. catalogs of his exhibitions were published in 1956, 1957, and 1963. Albums of his artwork were published in 1966 and 1977 (paintings) as well as in 1987 (bookplates). His paintings are regularly sold at art auctions. His most expensive painting Dzūkų kaimelis (Village of Dzūkai) was sold for €53,000 at Vilnius Auction in 2013. It is a well-known painting that is frequently added to various albums of Lithuanian art and was originally acquired by Pranas Mašiotas in 1910.

=== Design ===
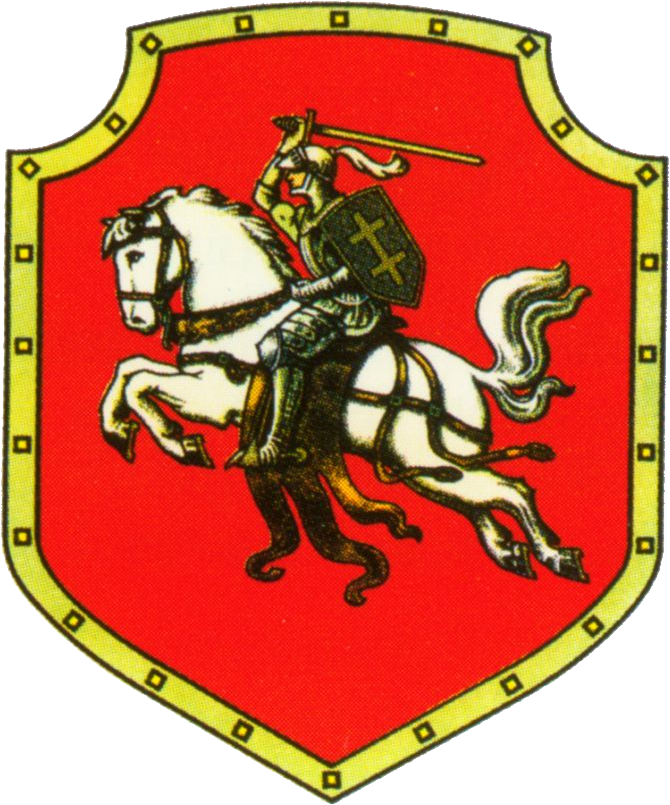
Coat of arms of Lithuania as drawn by Žmuidzinavičius

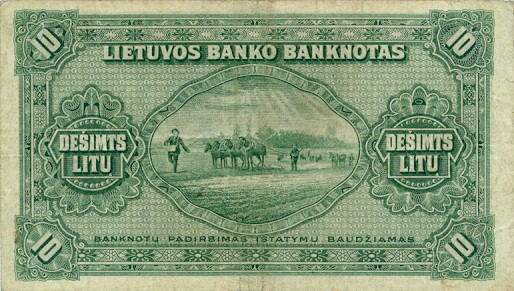
10 litas banknote (1927) designed by Žmuidzinavičius

Žmuidzinavičius participated in the creation of the modern Flag of Lithuania. He prepared green-red flag which decorated the halls during the Vilnius Conference in 1917. However, the delegates found such flag too dark and gloomy and Tadas Daugirdas proposed adding a yellow strip. The Council of Lithuania created a special three-member (Žmuidzinavičius, Daugirdas, and Jonas Basanavičius) commission to come up with the final flag design which was submitted on 19 April 1918. The proposed tricolor yellow-green-red was adopted and is in use today. Žmuidzinavičius also created a version of the coat of arms of Lithuania which was popular in interwar Lithuania (no design was chosen as the official version by the government). His version was based on the work of Tadeusz Dmochowski and depicted the knight diagonally giving the impression that it is flying. Žmuidzinavičius disregarded traditional colors and chose dark-toned shadows. Žmuidzinavičius also created some symbolic paintings with the rider from the coat of arms.

In 1919, Žmuidzinavičius participated in the plans to launch the national currency to replace the ostmark and ostrubel. He created drafts of the new banknotes (called muštinis) and travelled to Sweden to negotiate the printing, but the plans were abandoned. Instead, Lithuania introduced the gold-backed Lithuanian litas in 1922. It is very likely that Žmuidzinavičius participated in the design of the first litas banknotes as they bear the coat of arms of Lithuania that is very similar to Žmuidzinavičius' version. In 1927, Lithuania redesigned litas banknotes and Žmuidzinavičius was asked to design the 10 litas banknotes that would depict a Lithuanian village. He based his design on a photo by Antanas Tamošaitis of his brother sowing grain in spring.

In addition, Žmuidzinavičius created 32 postage stamps and designed the first hats and badges for the Lithuanian Army. He also designed the emblem (Cross of Vytis in a shield) of the Lithuanian Riflemen's Union.

=== Collections ===
Žmuidzinavičius was also known as an avid collector. He collected various items related to Lithuanian art and culture. In particular, he collected examples of Lithuanian folk art – clay whistles, Lithuanian sashes, aprons, knitted items, wood carvings. He also collected paintings, sculptures, graphic works, musical instruments as well as letters, photos, publications. In 1961, Žmuidzinavičius gifted his collections to the M. K. Čiurlionis National Art Museum. The collection of devil figurines reportedly started from a devil gifted by Juozas Tumas-Vaižgantas.

=== Publications ===
During his life, Žmuidzinavičius published several books. Using pen name Antanas Žemaitis (his surname is derived from Polish word Żmudź which means Žemaitis or Samogitian), he published a collection of essays Lietuvos keliais (On Lithuanian Roads, 1921) and of poems Gyvenimo takais (On Life's Paths, 1930). He also published two books of memoirs: Priešui ir tėvynei (For the Enemy and the Homeland) about his activities during the Lithuanian Wars of Independence in 1931 and Peletė ir gyvenimas (Palette and Life) about his life and career in 1961.

== Legacy ==
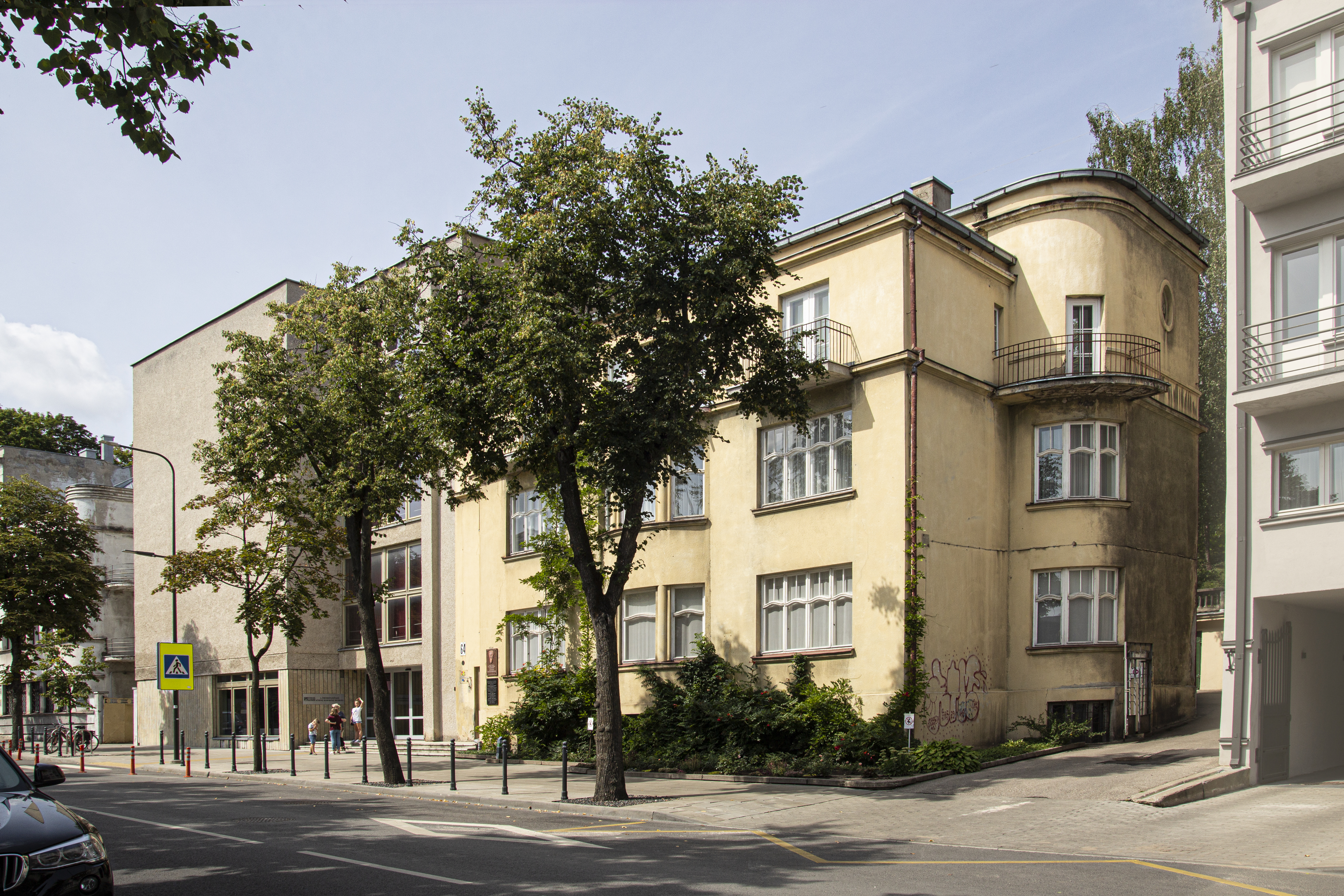
Žmuidzinavičius Museum in Kaunas

Žmuidzinavičius Museum, a branch of the M. K. Čiurlionis National Art Museum, was established in his former home in Kaunas in February 1966. The house, designed by architect Vytautas Landsbergis-Žemkalnis, was built in 1928 and expanded in 1938 by adding the third floor. The first floor was rented out (for a time it was a Swedish consulate where writer Henry Parland worked), the second floor was the living quarters of the family, and the third floor was the art studio. The house was one of the 44 modernist interwar buildings that received the European Heritage Label in 2015. The memorial museum displays authentic interwar décor, Žmuidzinavičius' paintings and collections, and various archival items. At that the time of the museum's opening, it had a collection of about 260 statues of the devil. The collection steadily grew due to international donations and was moved to a newly constructed three-floor annexe in 1982. The annexe, known as the Devils' Museum, now houses more than 3,000 devil-themed exhibits from more than 70 countries. An album of the devils' collection was published in 1967 and 1973.

The house in Balkūnai where Žmuidzinavičius grew up was turned into a memorial museum in 1982 by his nephew the theatre historian Vytautas Maknys. The museum displays restored furniture, photos, paintings, and other material related to the family. Until 2017, the museum organized an annual amateur theatre festival. The house where Žmuidzinavičius was born in Seirijai was demolished in 1938 but its location is marked by a 1.3-metre (4 ft 3 in) tall memorial stone erected in 1976. In 1986, a room-museum dedicated to Žmuidzinavičius was opened at the high school in Seirijai. The school was renamed in his honor in 1989. In 1949–1966, Žmuidzinavičius spent summer vacations in a wooden villa in Palanga. The house, built by Graf Feliks Tyszkiewicz, was added to the Lithuanian Registry of Cultural Heritage in 1993.

Streets in Kaunas, Alytus, Seirijai, Miroslavas, and Balkūnai are named after Žmuidzinavičius.

== Awards ==
Žmuidzinavičius received the following awards:

- 1928: Order of the Lithuanian Grand Duke Gediminas (3rd class)
- 1931: Riflemen's Star
- 1932: Order of the Three Stars
- 1936: Order of the Lithuanian Grand Duke Gediminas (2nd class)
- 1946: Honored Artist of the Lithuanian SSR
- 1954: People's Artist of the Lithuanian SSR
- 1957: People's Artist of the Soviet Union
