= Fairy Tale of the Kings =

Painting by Mikalojus Konstantinas Čiurlionis

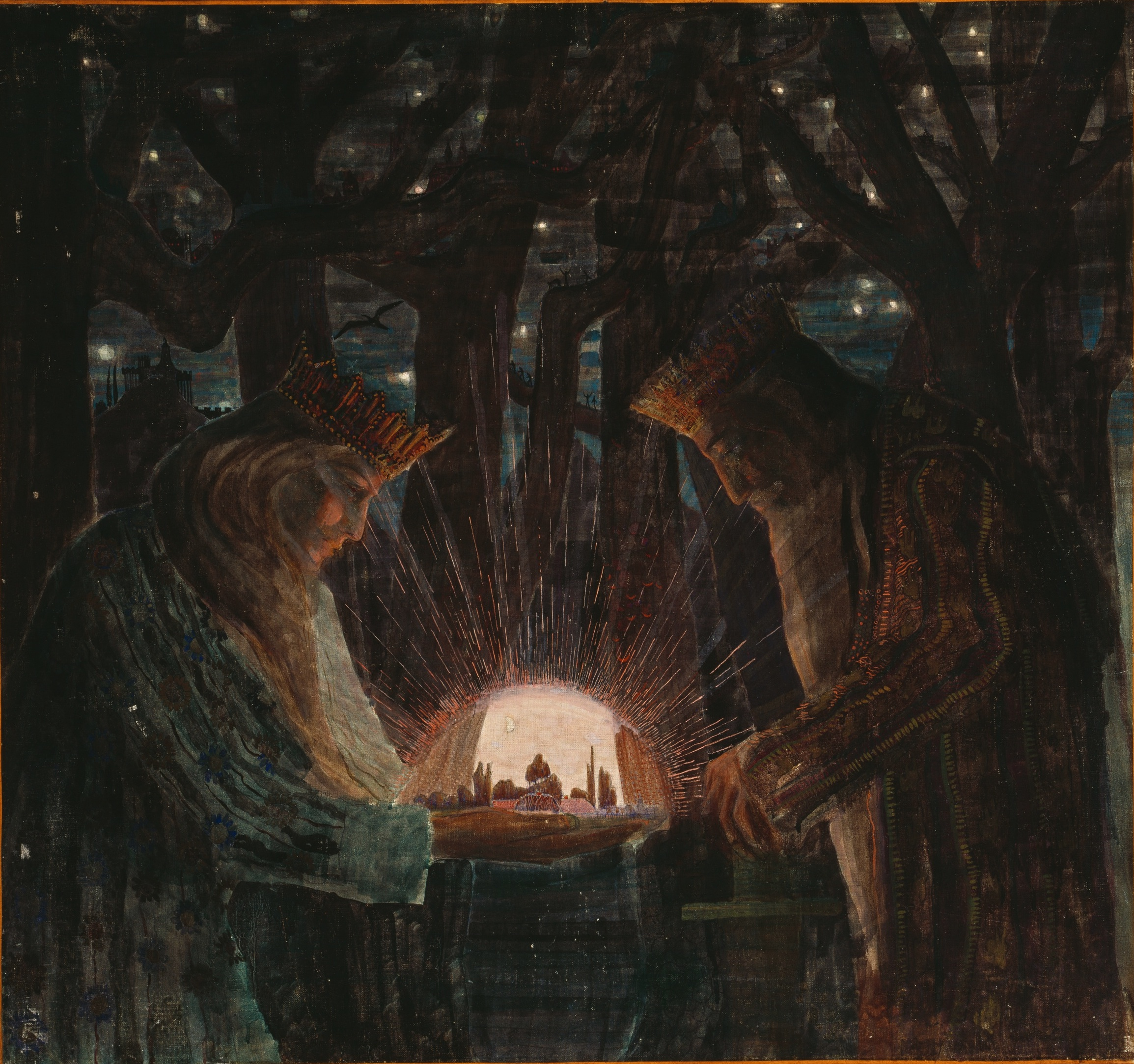
- Artist: Mikalojus Konstantinas Čiurlionis
- Year: 1909
- Medium: Tempera
- Dimensions: 70.2 cm × 75.3 cm (27.6 in × 29.6 in)
- Location: M. K. Čiurlionis National Art Museum; Kaunas

Fairy Tale of the Kings (Lithuanian: Karalių pasaka, originally Karaliai. Pasaka) is one of the most well-known paintings by Lithuanian painter and composer Mikalojus Konstantinas Čiurlionis. Sofija Kymantaitė-Čiurlionienė, Čiurlionis's wife, donated the painting to the M. K. Čiurlionis National Art Museum in 1922.

== Description ==
The painting shows two kings (or a queen and a king), one of whom is holding a shining glass globe in which there is a village, and the other holding a sword. The left king is wearing blue garments while the right is wearing red garments. Both of them are looking at the globe, which is the only source of light, with curiosity. Behind them is a dark forest with black trees. On each branch of the tree things like castles, dancing people, and flying birds are depicted. As is usual for Čiurlionis's abstract art, the painting has elements of Lithuanian folklore.

== History ==
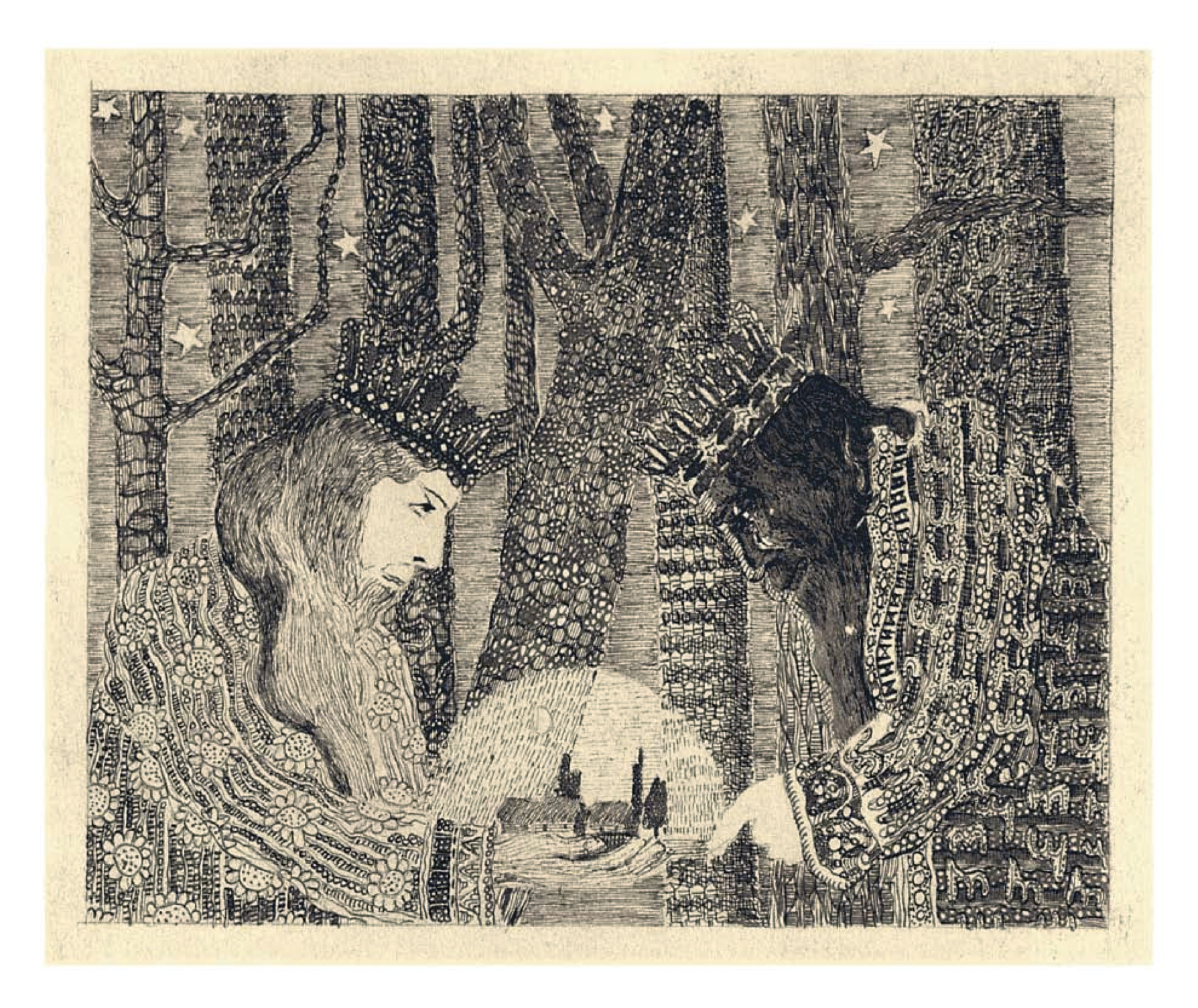
An early version of the painting in 1908

Čiurlionis wrote about Lithuanian folk art as the "foundation of our art, a peculiar Lithuanian style, and the Lithuanian style must rise from it – it is our pride, because the beauty it possesses is pure, peculiar and exclusively Lithuanian". Čiurlionis created a sketch of the painting earlier, in 1908; he painted the final version in 1909.

The painting was displayed in Dulwich Picture Gallery from 2022 to 2023.

== See also ==
- List of Lithuanian painters
- Lithuanian art
