= Stawski =

Stawski (feminine: Stawska; plural: Stawscy) is a Polish surname. It is related to a number of surnames in other languages.

Notable people with the surname include:

- Alfons Stawski (born 1945), Polish boxer
- Axel Stawski (born 1950/51), American billionaire real estate developer
- Ben Stawski (born 1990), English badminton player

== Related surnames ==
Language	Masculine	Feminine
Polish	Stawski	Stawska
Belarusian (Romanization)	Стаўскі (Staŭski)	Стаўская (Stauskaya, Staŭskaja)
Latvian	Stavskis	
Lithuanian	Stauskas	Stauskienė (married); Stauskaitė (unmarried)
Romanian/Moldovan	Stavschi, Stavschii	
Russian (Romanization)	Ставский (Stavskiy, Stavskii, Stavsky, Stavskij)	Ставская (Stavskaya, Stavskaia, Stavskaja)
Ukrainian (Romanization)	Ставський (Stavskyi, Stavskyy, Stavskyj)	Ставська (Stavska)
Other	Stawsky, Stafsky, Stafski	
