= Kaunas Picture Gallery =

Art museum in Lithuania

Coordinates: 54°53′55.83″N 23°55′24.76″E

- Kauno paveikslų galerija

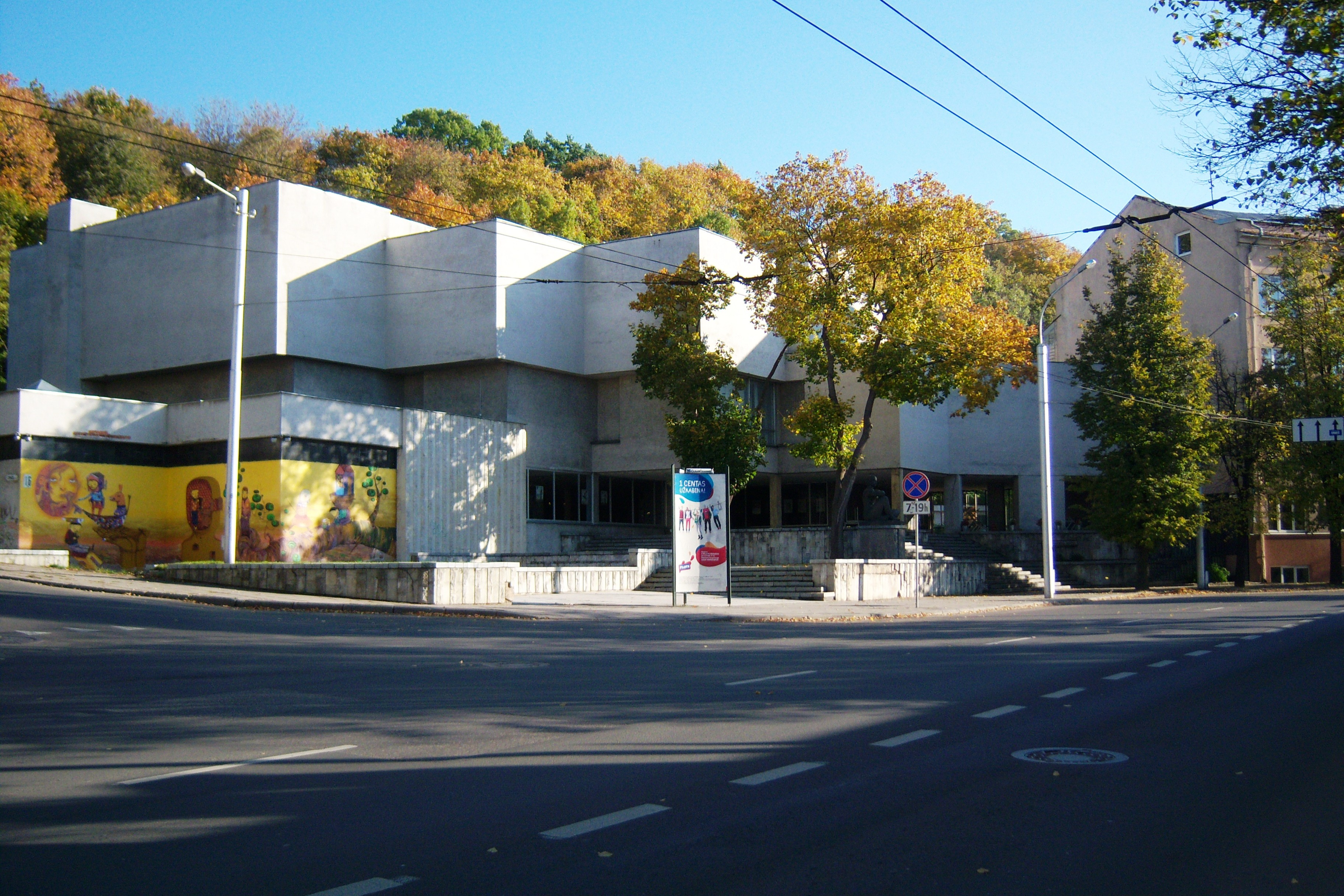
- The Kaunas Picture Gallery, in Kaunas, Lithuania
- Established: 1979; 47 years ago
- Location: Kaunas, Lithuania
- Type: Art Museum
- Owner: M. K. Čiurlionis National Art Museum
- Website: Official website

The Kaunas Picture Gallery (Lithuanian: Kauno paveikslų galerija) is an art museum based in Kaunas, Lithuania, which is a branch of the M. K. Čiurlionis National Art Museum. It opened in 1979, and houses part of the works donated by the famous Lithuanian collector Mykolas Žilinskas (along with the Mykolas Žilinskas Art Gallery). The gallery hosts exhibitions by Lithuanian and foreign artists and the community platform "Small Stories".

== Gallery building ==
The gallery was opened in 1979, as a branch of the M. K. Čiurlionis National Art Museum. The building was designed by architects Liucija Gedgaudienė and Jonas Navakas in the modernist Brutalist style. It houses part of the works donated by the famous Lithuanian collector Mykolas Žilinskas (along with the Mykolas Žilinskas Art Gallery). The three-storey structure of the building is a fractured rectangle. The ground floor houses an exhibition hall, a lobby, a cloakroom and a café. The second floor has three exhibition halls and an auditorium for events, while the third floor has four exhibition halls. The lobbies on all floors adjacent to the halls are also used for exhibitions.

== Collection ==
The gallery hosts exhibitions by Lithuanian and foreign artists and the community platform "Small Stories". The Fluxus Cabinet of Jurgis Mačiūnas is housed here. It exhibits works by J. Mačiūnas, Jonas Mekas, Joseph Beuys, Mieko Shiomi, Ben Vautier, George Brecht and other members of the Fluxus movement, including unconventional books, examples of mail art, prints, objects, etc. Alongside are works by Lithuanian authors (Jolanta Janavičienė, Jurgis Janavičius, Redas Diržys, Naglis R. Baltušnikas, the Post-Ars group, Kęstutis Grigaliūnas) dedicated to the movement. Visitors can see Ay-O's installation "Black Hole" and Takako Saito's installation "Manoman Theater".
