= Žmuidzinavičius Museum =

Museum in Kaunas, Lithuania

- Žmuidzinavičiaus muziejus

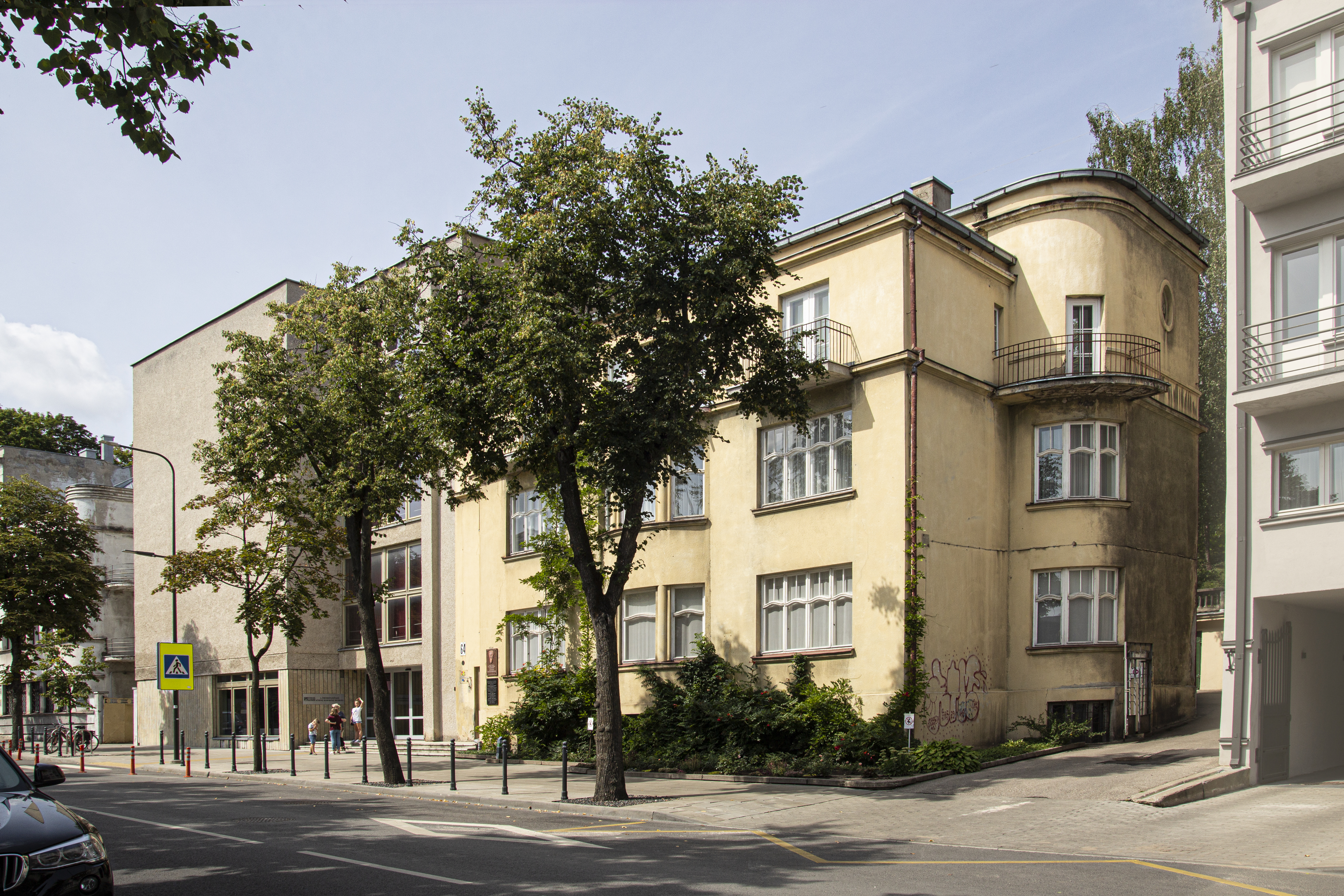
- The Devil Museum building, also known as A. Žmuidzinavičius Memorial House, in Kaunas, Lithuania
- Established: 1966
- Location: Kaunas, Lithuania
- Coordinates: 54°54′03″N 23°54′38″E
- Collection size: 3,000
- Founder: Antanas Žmuidzinavičius
- Owner: M. K. Čiurlionis National Art Museum

Žmuidzinavičius Museum (Lithuanian: Žmuidzinavičiaus muziejus), also known as the Devil Museum (Velnių muziejus), is a museum in Kaunas, Lithuania, dedicated to collecting and exhibiting sculptures and carvings of devils from all over the world. The museum is a part of M. K. Čiurlionis National Art Museum. The collection was started by artist Antanas Žmuidzinavičius (1876–1966), and a memorial museum was established in his house after his death. In 1966, the devil collection consisted of 260 sculptures but visitors began to leave their own devils as gifts to the museum. In 1982, a three-story extension was built to house the expanding collection and, as of 2009, the museum's holdings had grown to 3,000 items.

Most of the devils are sculptures in wood, ceramic, stone, or paper. Others are masks or paintings on silk or canvas. The devils, collected from all over the world, are diverse in style. Many of the devils are art objects, for display only, but other devils have been incorporated into usable objects such as pipes and nutcrackers. Many of the items represent folk myths and others express modern political ideas. For example, one sculpture depicts Hitler and Stalin as devils in a dance of death over a pile of human bones.

== Exhibits ==
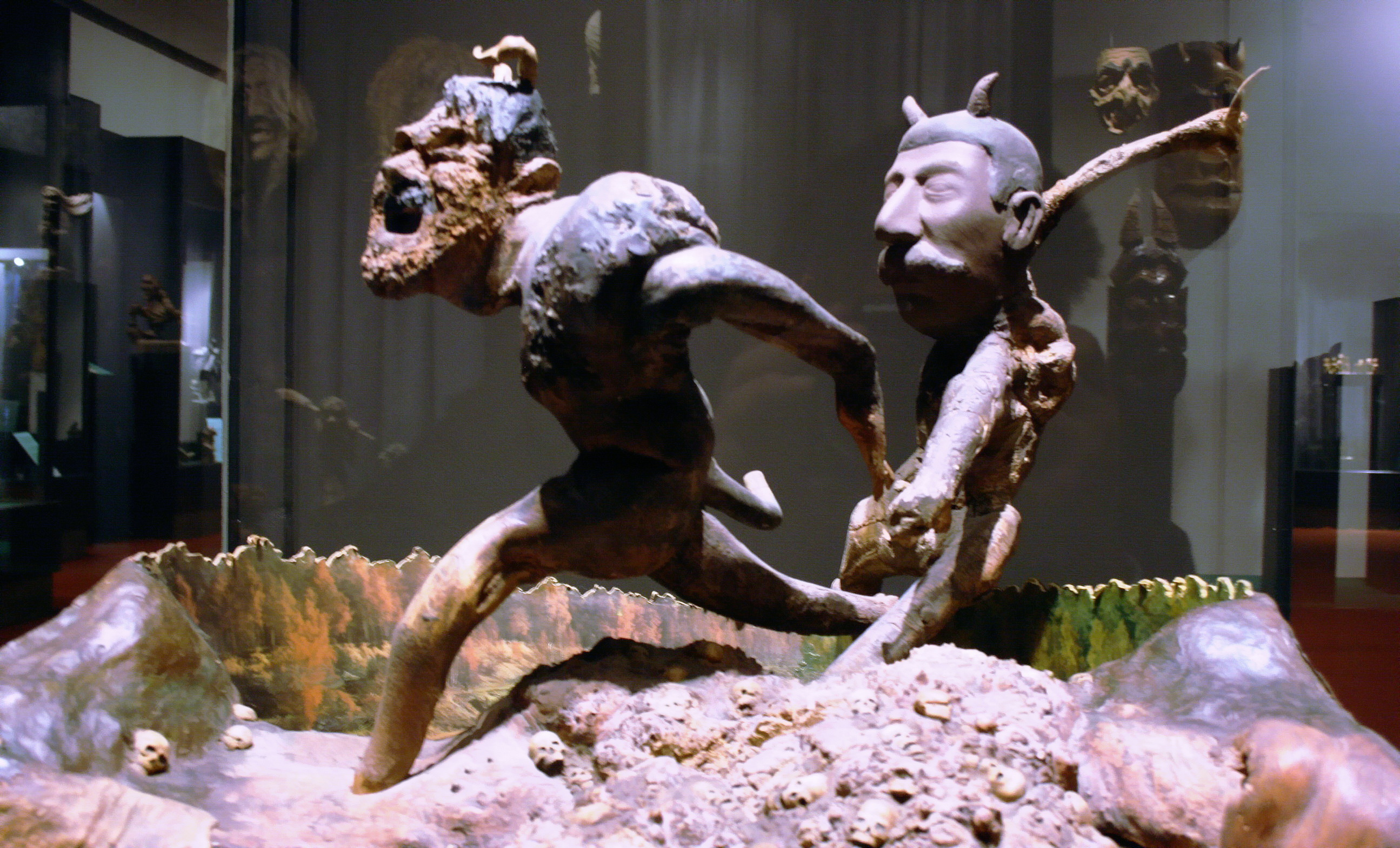
A sculpture of Hitler and Stalin as two devils in a dance of death over a pile of human bones

The first floor of the museum contains Žmuidzinavičius's collection which he acquired despite Soviet law against religious artefacts. One of the devils is so small that it is viewed through a magnifying glass.

On the second floor, is a huge wooden devil – given to the museum by someone who believed that the devil was causing bad luck. There are many wooden carvings of Scandinavian origin, plus donated items such as pebbles containing the devil's image.

The third floor contains many devils from former Soviet territories but others come from countries around the world including Japan, Cuba, and Mexico.
