= Stellar Sonata =

Two paintings by Mikalojus Konstantinas Čiurlionis

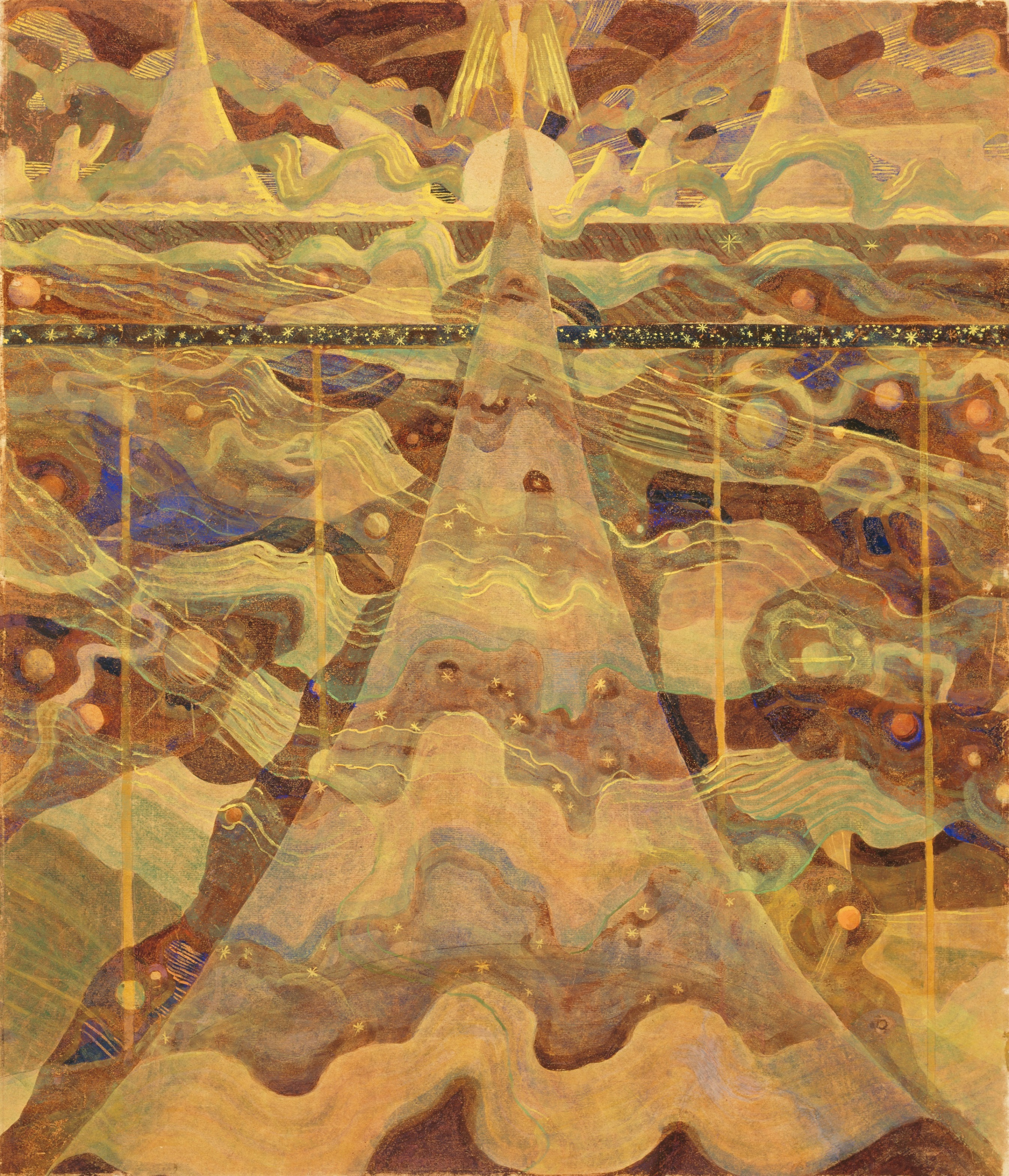
- Stellar sonata. Allegro
- Artist: Mikalojus Konstantinas Čiurlionis
- Year: 1908
- Medium: oil on canvas
- Dimensions: 72.2 cm × 61.4 cm (28.4 in × 24.2 in)
- Location: M. K. Čiurlionis National Museum of Art

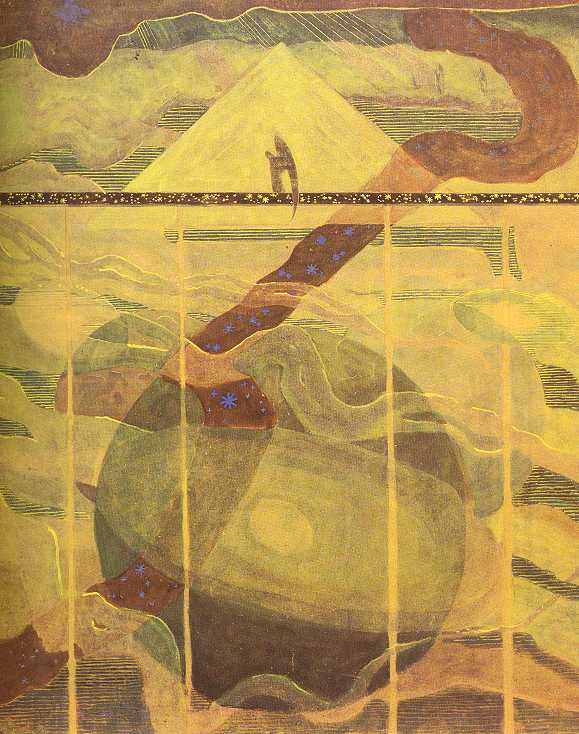
Stellar sonata. Andante - part two of planned four-painting cycle Žvaigždžių sonata

SONATA VI are two paintings, Stellar sonata. Allegro and Stellar sonata. Andante, of Mikalojus Konstantinas Čiurlionis from 1908.

== The artist ==
Čiurlionis was a Lithuanian composer and painter. His most famous musical compositions are probably the symphonic poems. In the Forest (Miške) and The Sea (Jūra). They are both in a late romantic idiom. As a painter Čiurlionis was a symbolist rooted in Lithuanian mythology, and his paintings were built in part by musical form principles.

== "Musical" paintings ==
Čiurlionis painted seven pictorial sonatas. He originally numbered them (the titles were later adapted). His pictorial sonatas can be connected with synaesthesia, the fusion of music and art, and embody an original approach to synæstesis. The artist uses principles of musical composition in the paintings associated with the structure of musical forms such as sonatas, fugues or preludes. He united motifs from reality, spatial levels, dates and contrasting symbolic images into a single compositional system or cycle, based on the dynamics of rhythm. Stellar Sonata. Allegro is a vision of outer space with fantastic multi-layered images.

The compositional elements of the painting are arranged in a complex varying rhythm. To portray the third dimension he did not use perspective, but instead overlays of varying opacity. Čiurlionis imagines the universe as a grand polyphonic symphony, junctions of cosmic nebulae, stars and sunlight. The waves of this space ocean - the songs - mix together to form a rich, ornamented and beautiful network pierced by the path of the Milky Way. The movement in outer space is not chaotic, but rhythmic and harmonic. The symbol of order and harmony in the universe is an angel-like, a figure of light standing on a tapered tower of light. The second part of the sonata ( "Stellar sonata. Andante") is also solemn and monumental, but much more restrained: a few bands of cosmic fog blur one spherical planet, perhaps the Earth itself, and an angel goes slowly over the band of the Milky Way, and gives the impression of serene and magnificent music. This is one of the artist's most musical creations, full of the interplay of colors, rhythmic variations and a powerful imagination.
