= All Through the Night (Žmuidzinavičius) =

1906 painting by Antanas Žmuidzinavičius

Coordinates: 54.6808°N 25.2900°E

- Visą naktį (Lithuanian)
- Artist: Antanas Žmuidzinavičius
- Year: 1906
- Type: oil on plywood
- Dimensions: 84 cm × 110 cm (33 in × 43 in)
- Location: Lithuanian Art Museum

All Through the Night is an oil painting by Antanas Žmuidzinavičius, from 1906.

== Description ==
The painting has dimensions 84 cm x 110 cm. It is in the collection of Lithuanian Art Museum.

== Analysis ==
The painting is from the artist's early period. The composition is simple. It shows a table, a lamp, and a window with the sky beginning to lighten outside. The painting is in the realist style.
