= M. K. Čiurlionis National Art Museum =

Coordinates: 54°54′0″N 23°54′41″E

- Nacionalinis Mikalojaus Konstantino Čiurlionio dailės muziejus
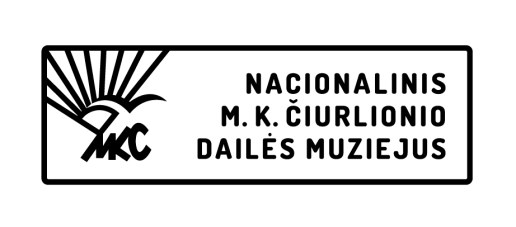

- The M. K. Čiurlionis National Art Museum Building, in Kaunas, Lithuania
- Established: 1921
- Location: V. Putvinskio g. 55 Kaunas, Lithuania
- Type: Art museum
- Collection size: M.K. Čiurlionis' works, Lithuanian folk art, fine and applied arts (15th-20th centuries), ancient world art, foreign fine and applied art, numismatics
- Director: Daina Kamarauskienė
- Website: Official Website

The M. K. Čiurlionis National Art Museum (Lithuanian: Nacionalinis Mikalojaus Konstantino Čiurlionio dailės muziejus) is a group of museums based in Kaunas, Lithuania. It is primarily dedicated to exhibiting and publicizing the works of the painter and musician M.K. Čiurlionis (1875–1911).

The museum was founded in 1921, and opened a temporary gallery in 1925. It was renamed Vytautas the Great Museum of Culture in 1936, receiving its current name in 1944. An expansion took place in 1969. The interwar part of the building was built in Art Deco and early functionalism style.

The museum sponsors international exhibitions along with lectures, concerts, conferences, and special educational activities for children.

The museum shares its building with the Vytautas the Great War Museum and is located in the New Town of Kaunas. The oldest still functioning Žaliakalnis Funicular Railway is situated nearby. It climbs 142 metres (466 ft) up from behind the M. K. Čiurlionis National Art Museum to the Church of the Resurrection.

In 2015, the building was one of 44 objects in Kaunas to receive the European Heritage Label.

== Exhibition ==
M. K. Čiurlionis Art Museum in Kaunas has more than 355,000 items. The museum’s exhibit collections consist of M. K. Čiurlionis’ heritage, Lithuanian folk art, fine and applied arts of Lithuania of the fifteenth-twentieth centuries, ancient world art, foreign fine and applied art, numismatics, archives of folk art and the artistic life items of Lithuania.

Branches of the M. K. Čiurlionis National Art Museum include:

- the Mykolas Žilinskas Art Gallery
- Kaunas Picture Gallery
- Kaunas Historical Presidential Palace
- Ceramics Museum
- Devils' Museum
- M. K. Čiurlionis Memorial Museum
- Antanas Žmuidzinavičius Memorial Museum
- Paulius Galaunė Family House
- Liudas Truikys and Marijona Rakauskaite Museum
- Juozas Zikaras Museum
- Vytautas Kazimieras Jonynas Gallery.

== Directors ==
Museum's directors were:

- Paulius Galaunė (1944–1949)
- B. Sirutis (1949–1951)
- Petras Stauskas (1951–1988)
- Malvydas Sakalauskas (1988–1992)
- Osvaldas Daugelis (1992–2019)
- Ina Pukelytė (2019)
- Daina Kamarauskienė (since 2020)

== Gallery ==
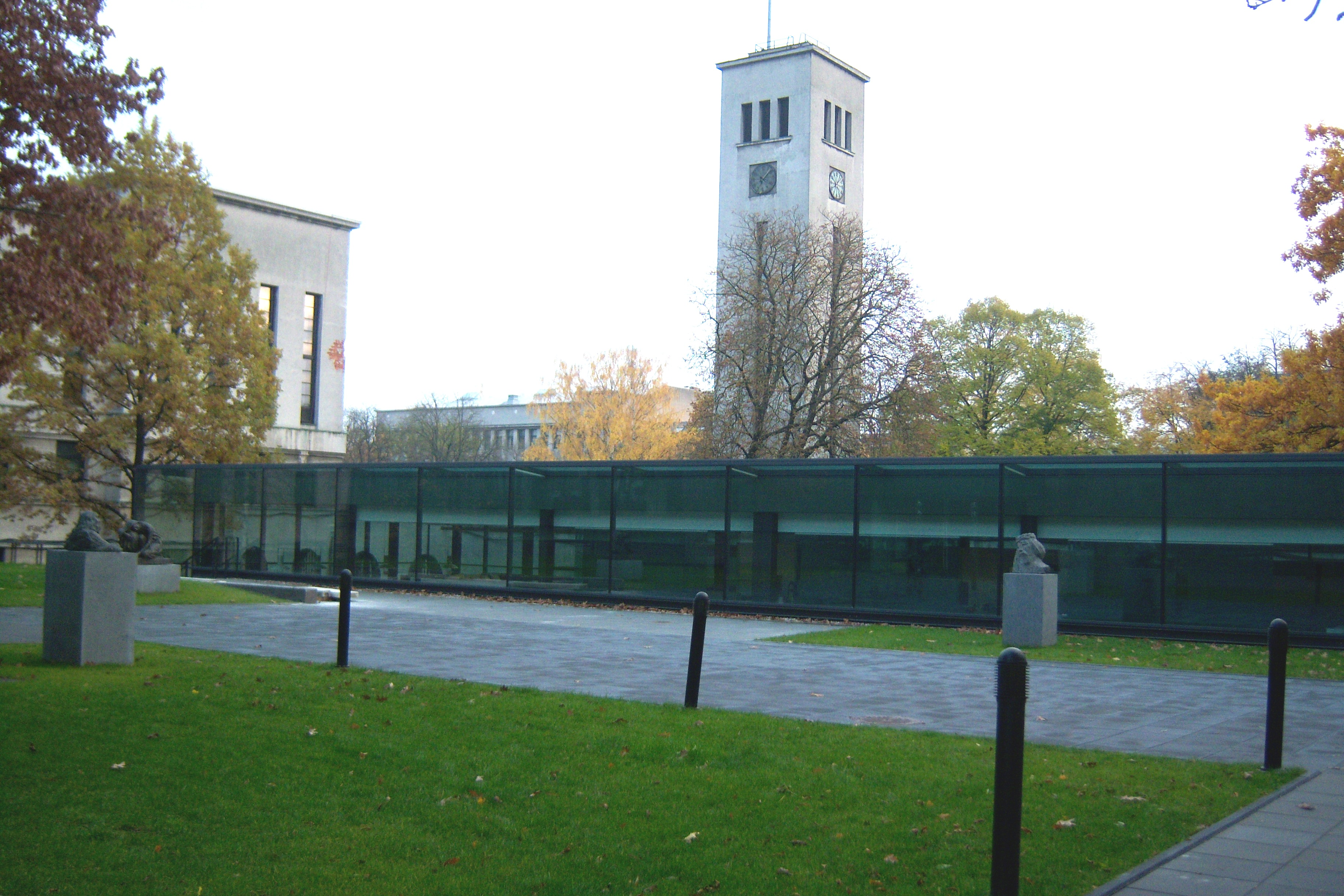
Administrative building of the M. K. Čiurlionis National Art Museum

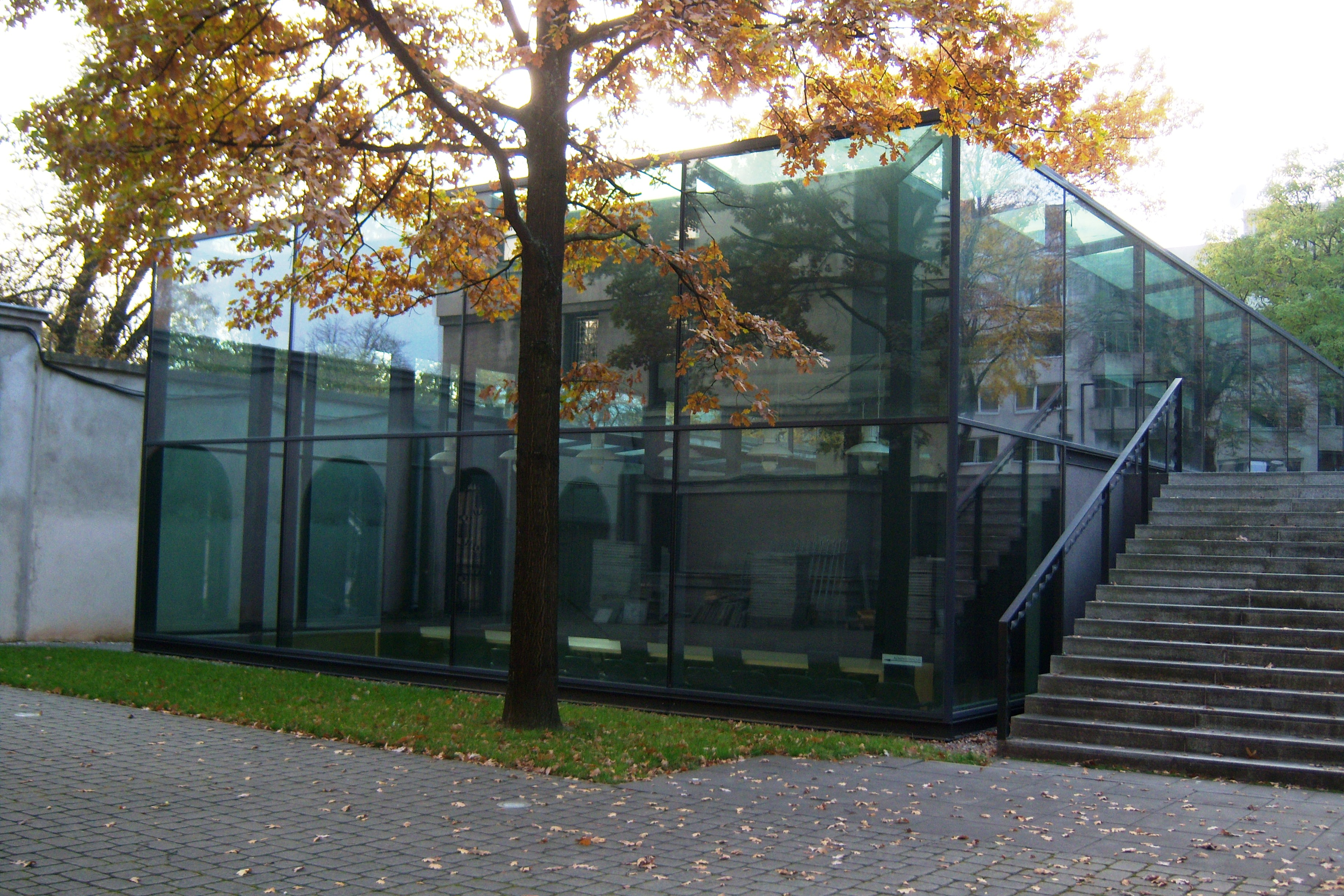
The M. K. Čiurlionis National Art Museum

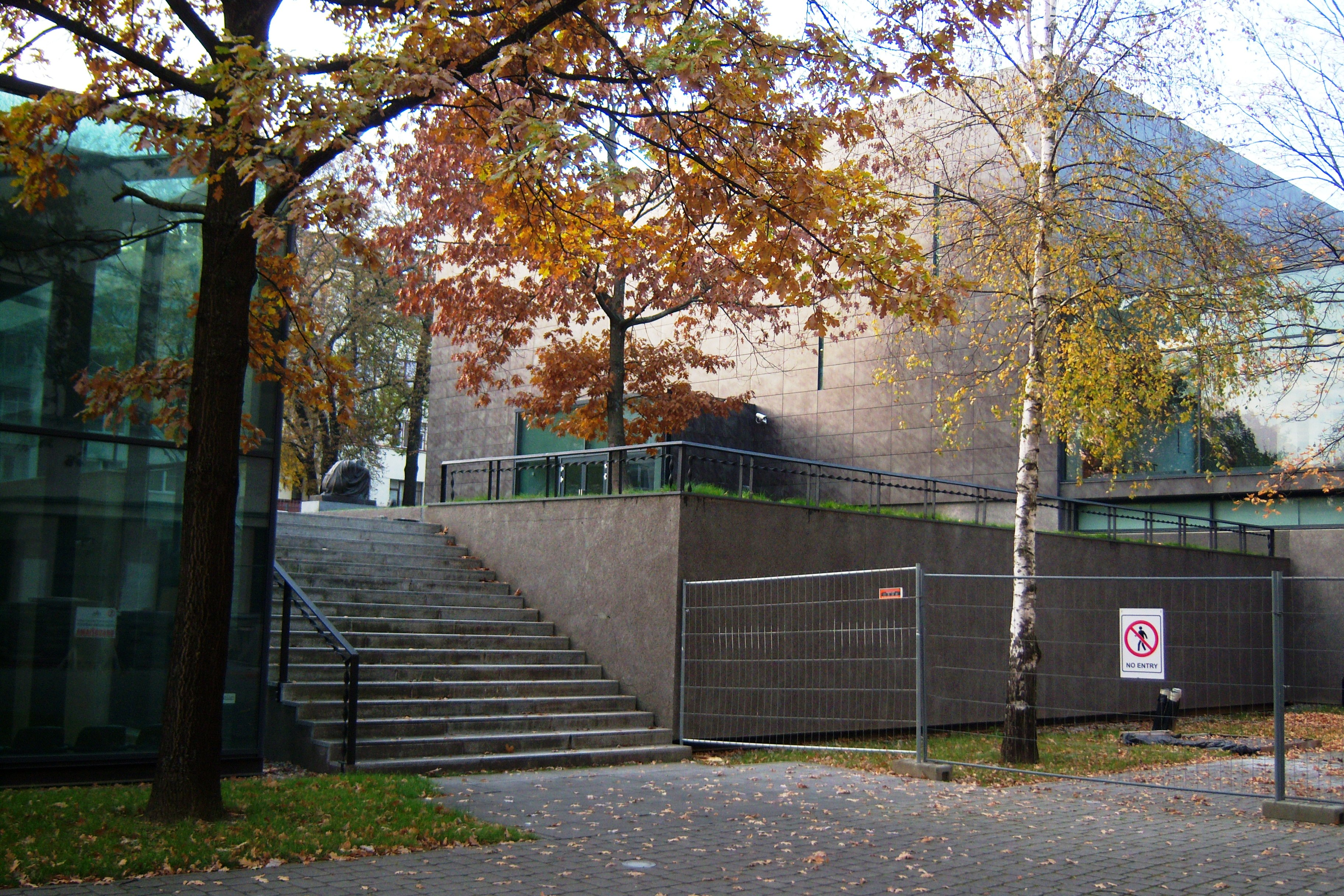
Stairs to the M. K. Čiurlionis National Art Museum

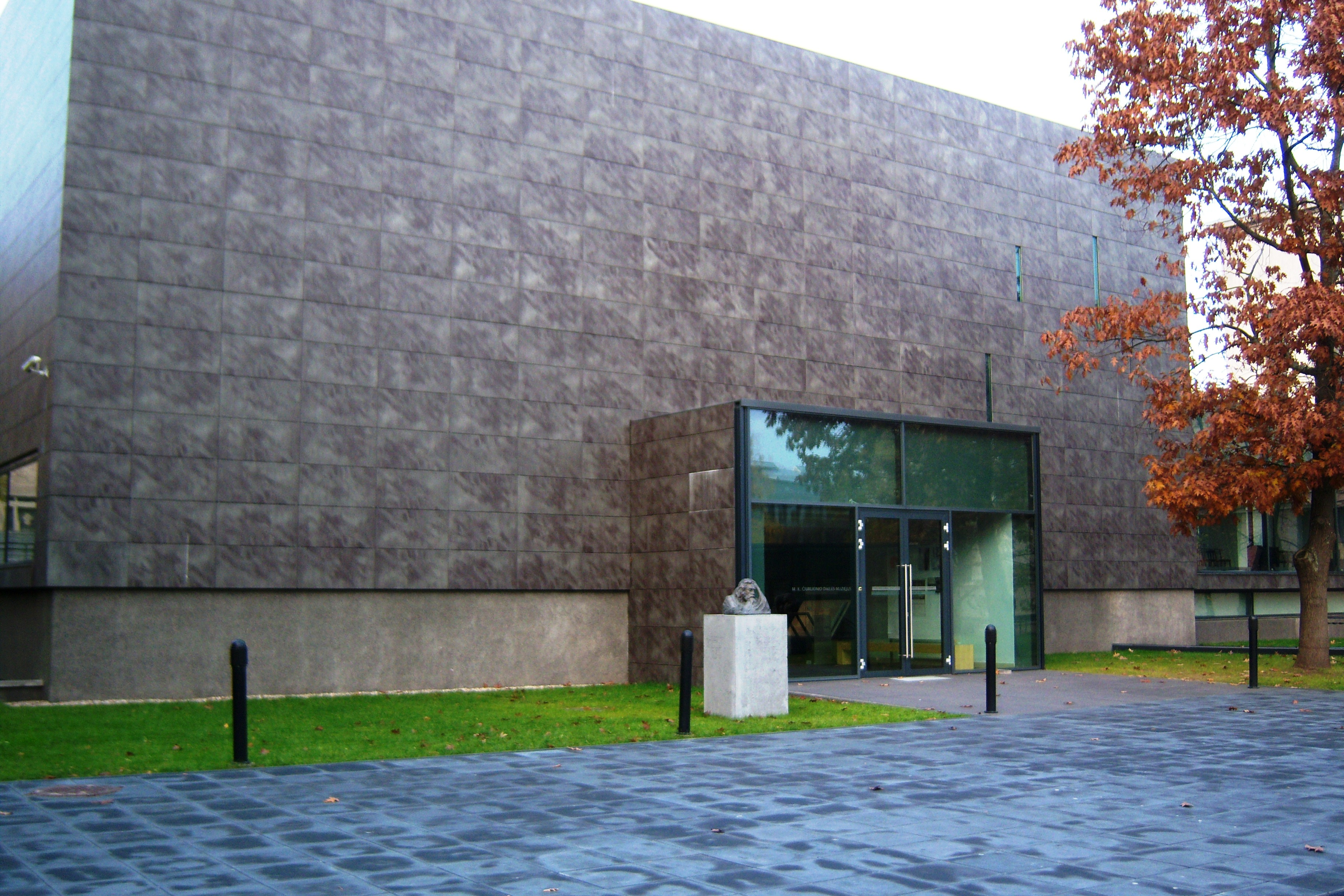
New exhibition building of the M. K. Čiurlionis National Art Museum

== See also ==
- Fairy Tale of the Kings
- Stellar Sonata
