= Contemporary Art Centre (Vilnius) =

Art gallery in Vilnius, Lithuania

Coordinates: 54°40′41″N 25°17′9″E

- Šiuolaikinio meno centras

- Contemporary Arts Centre building
- Established: 18 October 2018; 7 years ago
- Location: Vokiečių str. 2, Vilnius, Lithuania
- Type: Art museum
- Director: Valentinas Klimašauskas
- Architect: Vytautas Čekanauskas
- Website: www.cac.lt

Contemporary Art Centre (CAC, Lithuanian: Šiuolaikinio meno centras) – art institution, established in 1992 by Lithuanian Ministry of Culture. CAC has replaced the Arts Exhibition Palace (Lithuanian: Dailės parodų rūmai) and took over its building in Vilnius, 2 Vokiečių street. CAC contains five exposition rooms (total area exceeds 2000 sq. m) and a cinema hall. In 1997 FLUXUS cabinet of George Maciunas was opened, housing a permanent exhibition of fluxus artworks, assembled from private collection of Gilbert and Lila Silverman. Since 2005 CAC the periodic journal "ŠMC/CAC Interviu" is issued by CAC.

== Links ==
- Official website
