= Mykolas Žilinskas Art Gallery =

Coordinates: 54°53′46.79″N 23°55′14.49″E

- Mykolo Žilinsko dailės galerija

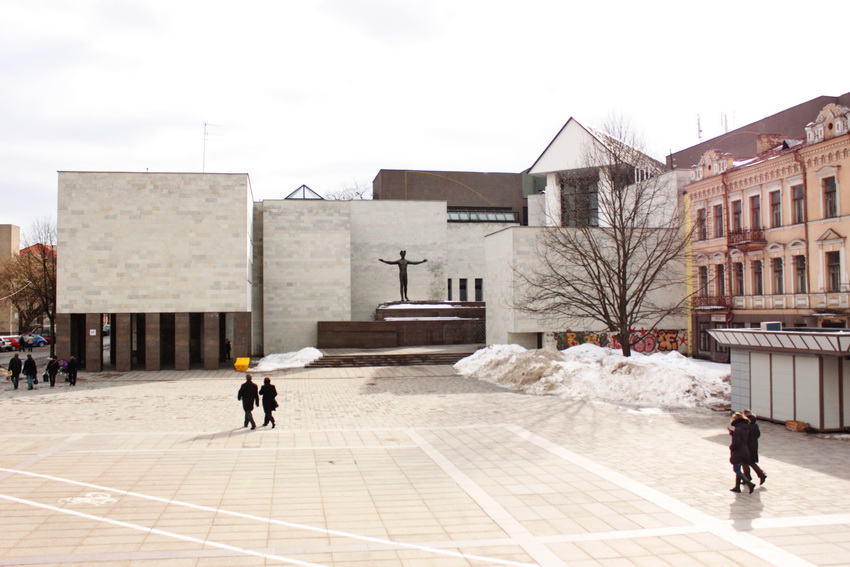
- The Mykolas Žilinskas Art Gallery building, in Independence square, Kaunas, Lithuania
- Established: 1963; 63 years ago
- Location: Kaunas, Lithuania
- Type: Art Museum
- Owner: M. K. Čiurlionis National Art Museum
- Website: Official website

The Mykolas Žilinskas Art Gallery (Lithuanian: Mykolo Žilinsko dailės galerija) is an art museum based in Kaunas, Lithuania, branching off from the M. K. Čiurlionis National Art Museum. The majority of exhibited works were donated by Lithuanian collector Mykolas Žilinskas. In 1991, the sculpture "Man", created by Petras Mazūras in 1986, was erected next to the entrance. In 2020, the post-modernist building of the gallery was included in the Registry of Cultural Property.

The gallery houses a collection of 1,683 works of art donated by Mykolas Žilinskas to the city of Kaunas between 1974 and 1988. In 1978, a new picture gallery was built on K. Donelaitis Street to house the collection. As Žilinskas continued to donate new works, a new bigger gallery building was deemed necessary, which subsequently opened on 30 June 1989. The new gallery was opened in Independence Square (architects Eugenijus Miliūnas, Kęstutis Kisielius, Saulius Juškys).

The Mykolas Žilinskas Art Gallery exhibits Ancient Egyptian art, 17th-20th century European applied-decorative art, 17th-18th century Italian paintings, 19th - 20th-century Western European paintings, and early 20th-century paintings and sculptures by Baltic artists. Three rooms of the gallery are reserved for temporary exhibitions of the works of Lithuanian and foreign artists. The gallery has a Contemporary Art Information Centre, a lecture theatre, the "Menapilis" cinema and a children's aesthetic education studio, and an exhibition "Museum for the Blind" for visually impaired visitors.

== Image gallery ==
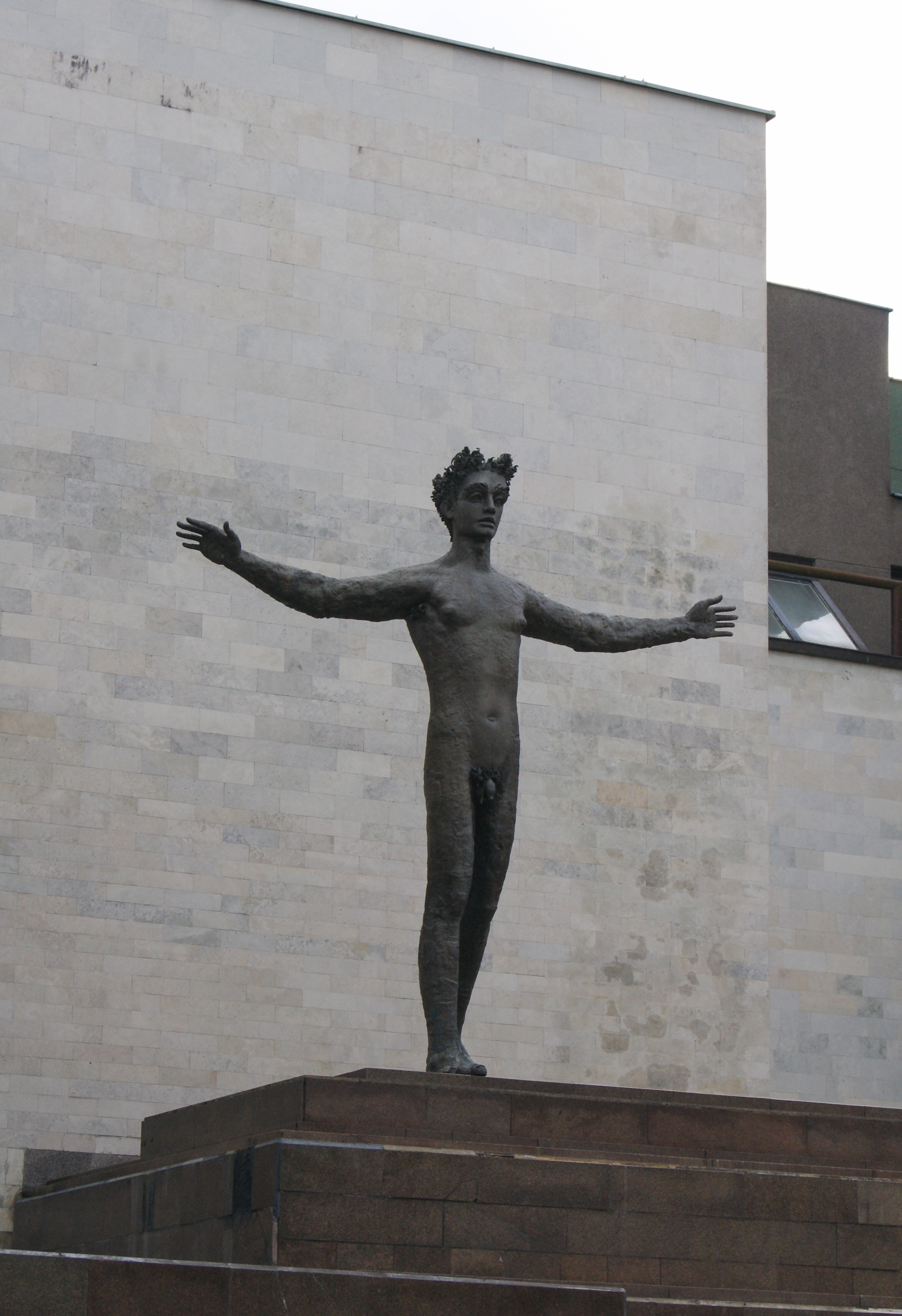
Statue of a Man

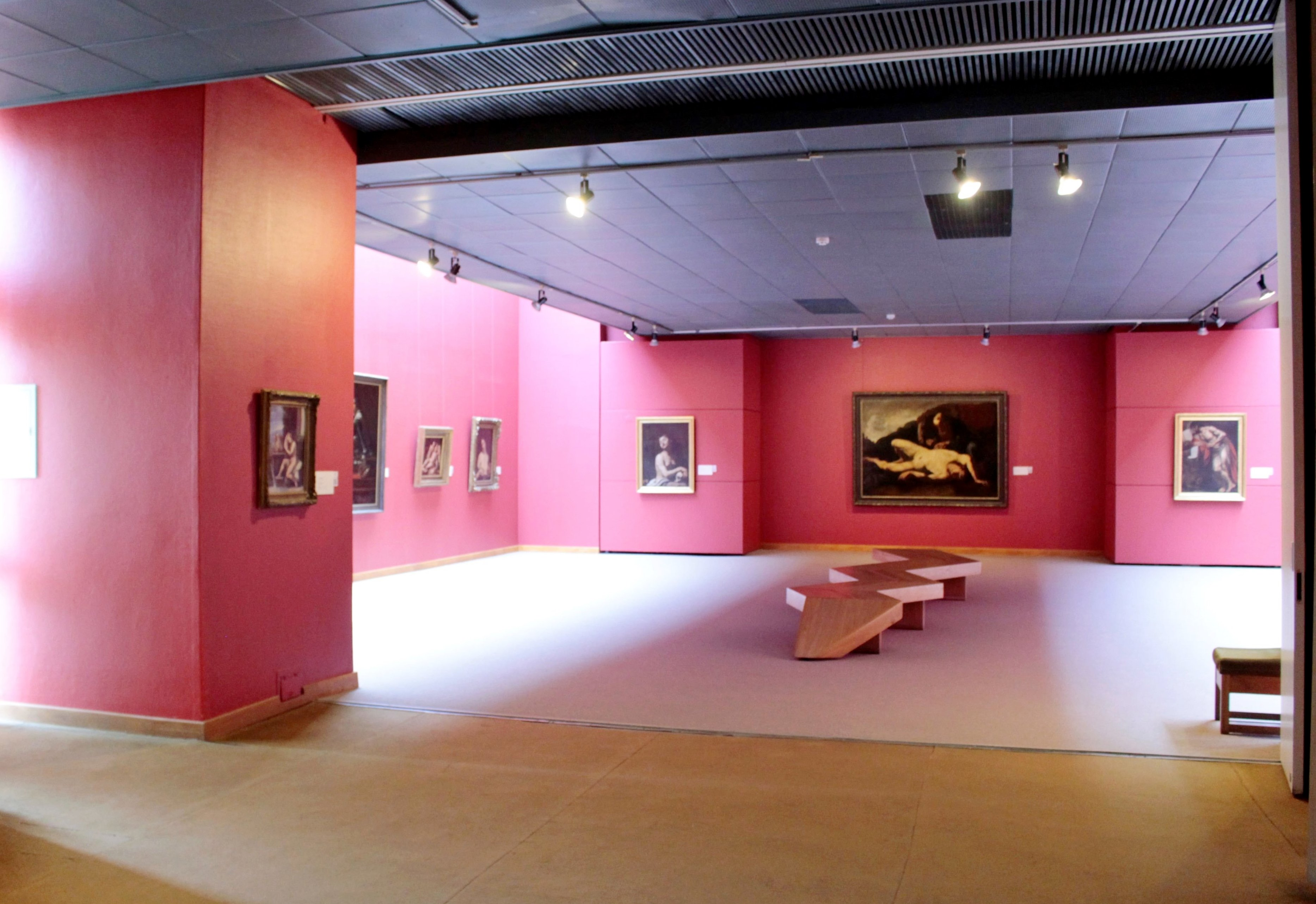
Interior of the gallery
