= List of people from Kaunas =

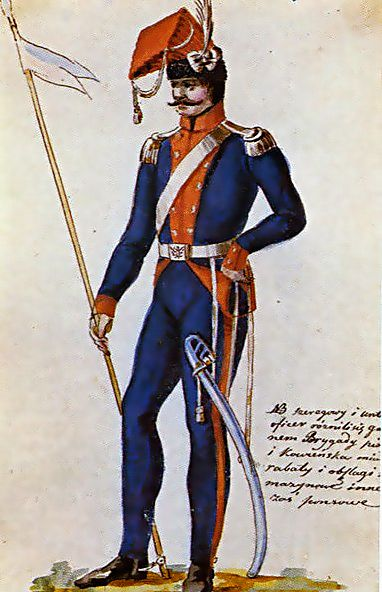
1st Lithuanian National Cavalry Brigade of the Grand Ducal Lithuanian Army in 1792

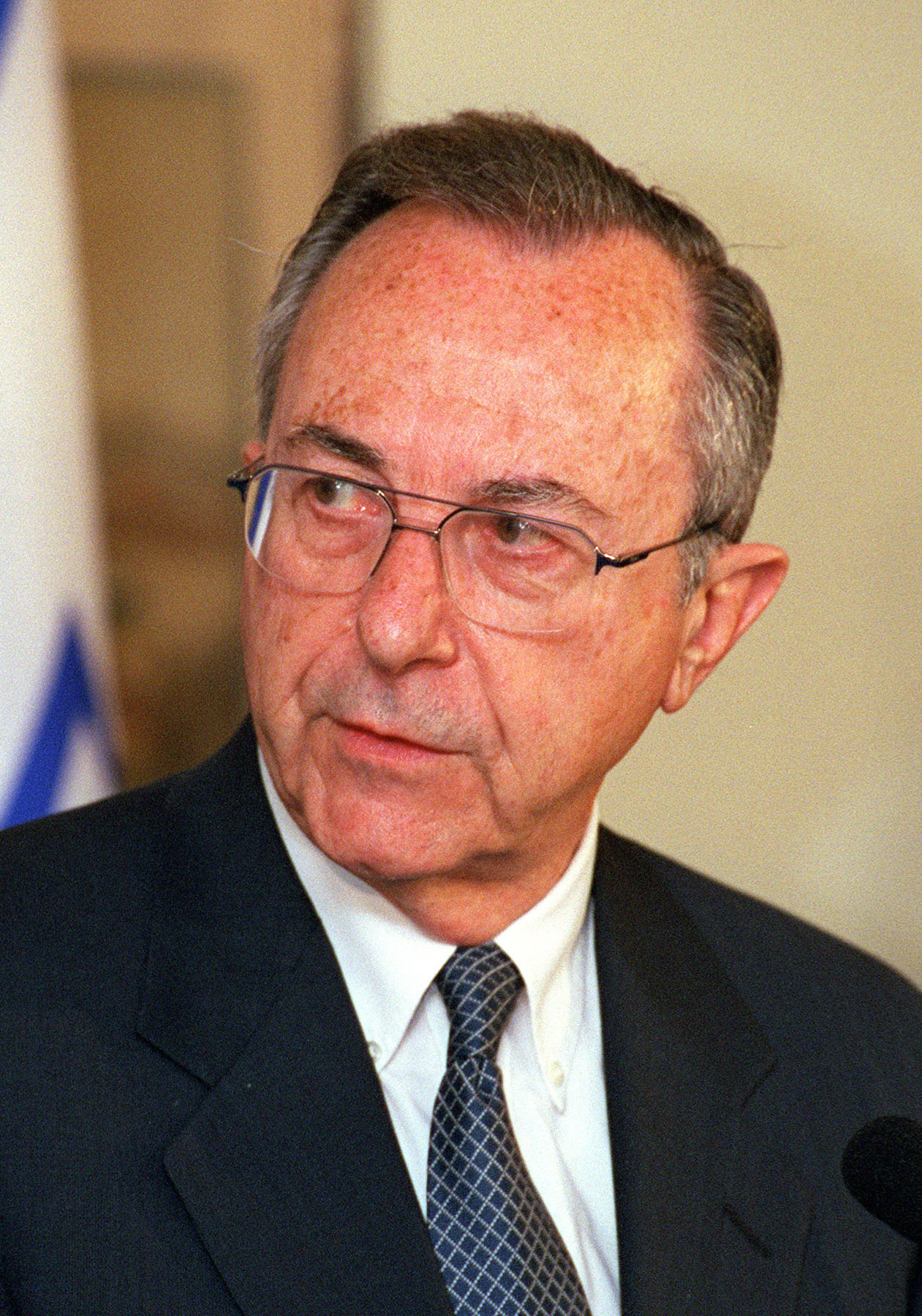
Moshe Arens

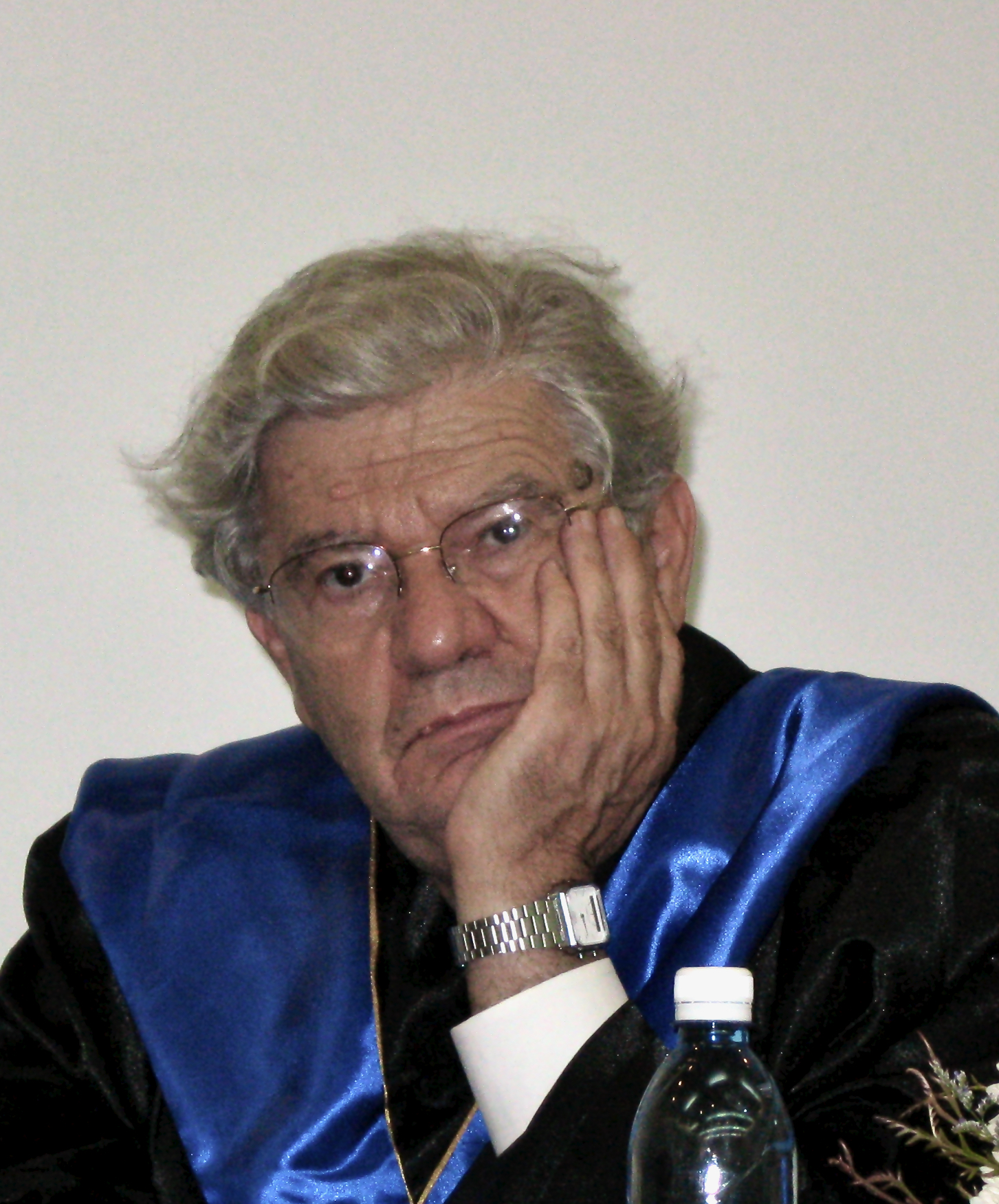
Aharon Barak

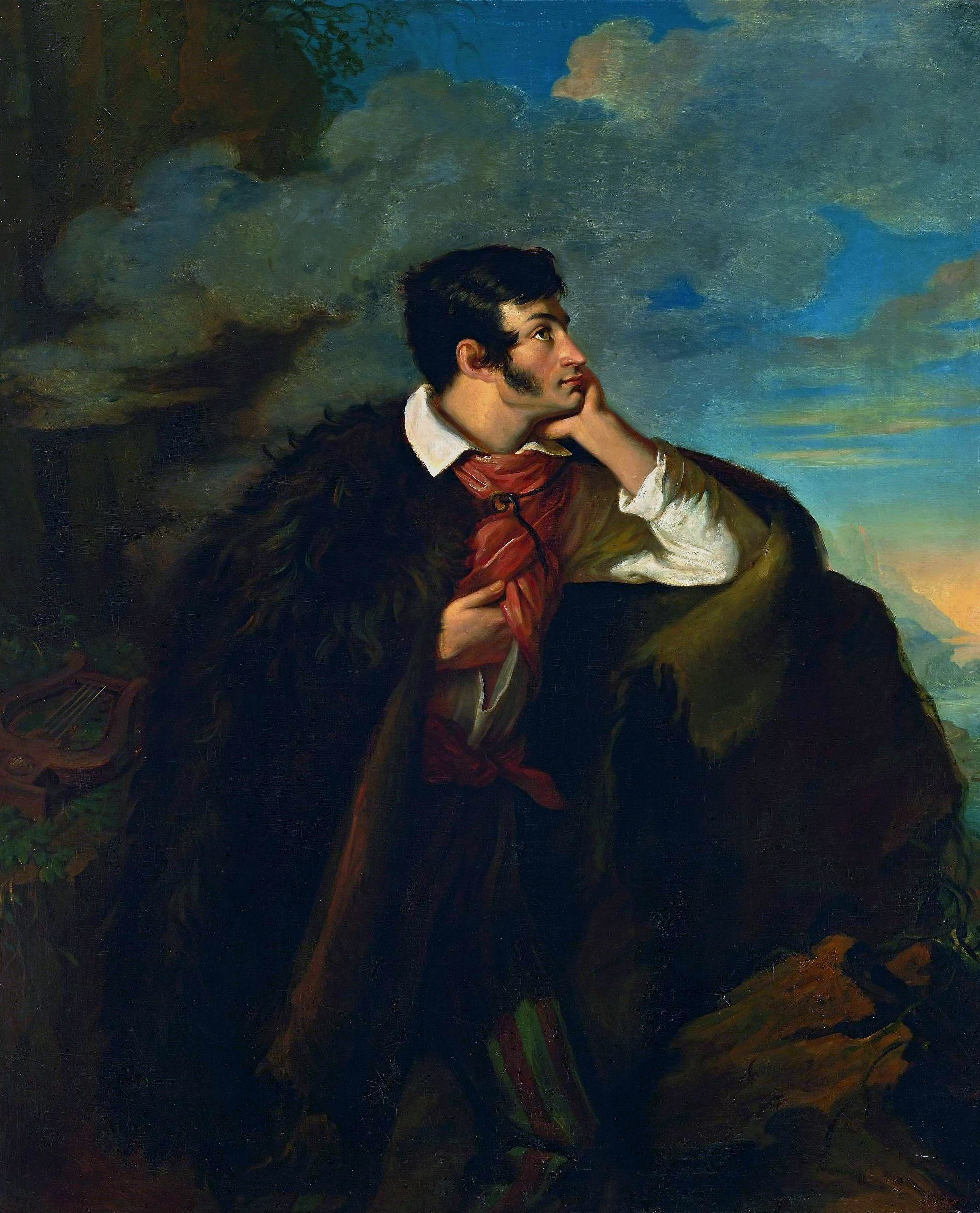
Adam Mickiewicz

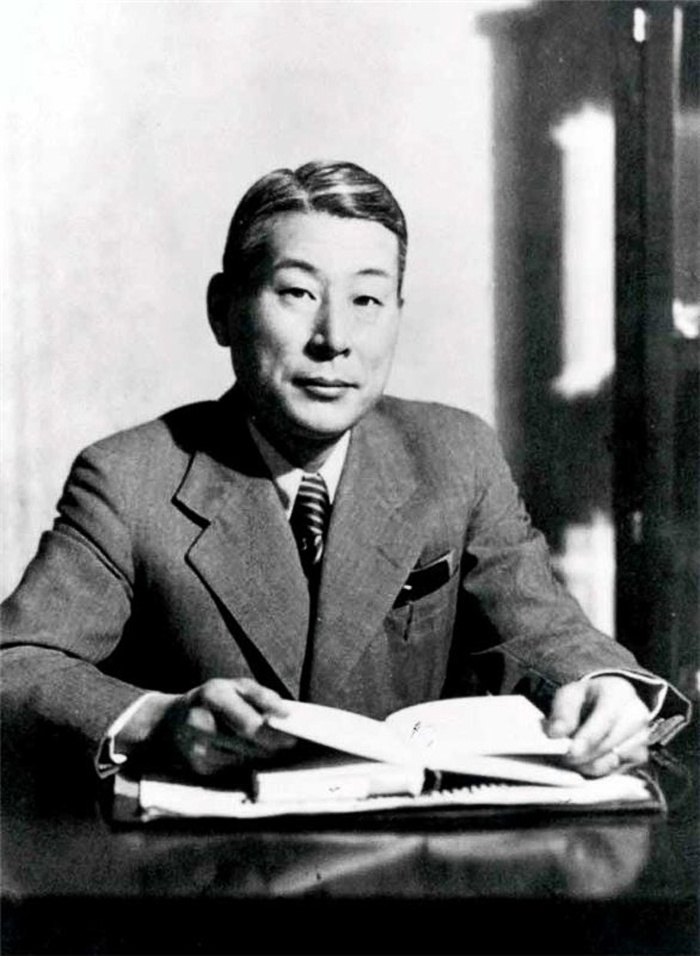
Chiune Sugihara

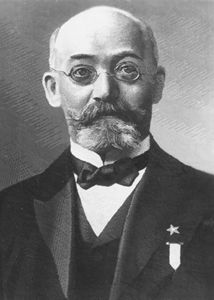
L. L. Zamenhof

The following is a list of notable people from Kaunas, Lithuania.

- Valdas Adamkus ((born 1926), politician, diplomat, civil engineer, President of Lithuania
- Diana Adlienė (born 1954), medical physicist and doctor of physical sciences
- Aharon Amir (1923–2008), Israeli Hebrew poet, translator, and writer
- Antanas Andrijauskas (born 1948), habilitated doctor and professor
- Moshe Arens (1925–2019), Israeli statesman and diplomat
- Donatas Banionis (1924–2014), stage and film actor and theatre director
- Aharon Barak (born 1936), professor of law and former President of the Supreme Court of Israel
- Antanas Baranauskas (1835–1902), poet, mathematician, and Catholic bishop
- Svetlana Beriosova (1932–1998), prima ballerina with the Royal Ballet of England
- Fania Brancowska (1922–2024), teacher, member of the Jewish resistance
- Sir Montague Burton (1885–1952), British retail magnate
- Algimantas Dailide (1921–2015), official of the Lithuanian Security Police (Saugumas) in WWII
- Marija Gimbutienė (1921–1994), archaeologist and anthropologist
- Sara Ginaite (born 1924), former resistance fighter, now Canadian academic
- Audronė Girdzijauskaitė (born 1938), theatre and art critic
- Nerijus Glezekas (born 1985), American singer, musician and songwriter
- Leah Goldberg (1911–1970), Israeli poet
- Emma Goldman (1869-1940), anarchist
- Leyb Gorfinkel (1896–1976), advocate, journalist, and politician
- Juozas Grušas (1901–1986), writer and editor
- Joseph Gurwin (1920–2009), American philanthropist
- Žydrūnas Ilgauskas (born 1975), basketball player
- Tadas Ivanauskas (1882–1970), zoologist and biologist
- Valdas Ivanauskas (born 1966), footballer, played 420 games
- Šarūnas Jasikevičius (born 1976), basketball player and coach
- Romas Kalanta (1953–1972), student protester and self-immolater
- Leonardas Kazokas (1905–1981), an expressionist painter
- Kęstutis Kemzūra (born 1970), basketball player
- Linas Kleiza (born 1985), basketball player
- Albert Wijuk Kojałowicz (1609–1677), historian, theologian, and translator
- Władysław Komar (1940–1998), a Polish shot putter, actor and cabaretist
- Lazare Kopelmanas (1907-1980), lawyer and diplomat
- Vytautas Landsbergis (born 1932), politician and member of the European Parliament
- Emmanuel Levinas (1906–1995), a French philosopher
- Moshe Leib Lilienblum (1843–1910), early Zionist thinker
- Aleksandras Machtas (1892–1973), chess player
- George Maciunas (1931–1978), artist, founding member of Fluxus
- Maironis (1862–1932), a Roman Catholic priest and poet
- Abraham Mapu (1808–1867), Hebrew novelist of the Haskalah movement
- Šarūnas Marčiulionis (born 1964), basketball player
- Døvydas Maščinskas (born 1992), musician and content creator
- Rūta Meilutytė (born 1997), an Olympian gold medallist, swimmer
- Adam Mickiewicz (1798–1855), a Polish Romantic poet
- Hermann Minkowski (1864–1909), mathematician and one of Einstein's teachers
- Oskar Minkowski (1858–1931), a German physician and medical researcher
- Donatas Motiejūnas (born 1990), basketball player
- Yitzhak Olshan (1895–1983), second President of the Supreme Court of Israel
- Jonas Paulavičius (1898–1952), carpenter and veteran of the Lithuanian Wars of Independence
- Vlado Perlemuter (1904–2002), French pianist
- Petras Rimša (1881–1961), sculptor and medalist
- Vladimir Romanov (born 1947), businessman, chairman of UBIG Investments
- Michał Pius Römer (1880–1945), lawyer, scientist and politician.
- Nina Schenk Gräfin von Stauffenberg (1913–2006), countess
- Arvydas Sabonis (born 1964), basketball player
- Israel Sack (1883–1959), American antiques dealer
- Sidney Shachnow (1934–2018), US Army general
- Markas Šilkūnas (born 2009), racing driver
- Mykolas Sleževičius (1882–1939), lawyer, political figure, and journalist
- Yitzchak Elchanan Spektor (1817–1896), Rabbi of Kaunas and Talmudic authority
- Ladislas Starevich (1882–1965), stop-motion animator
- Eliyahu Stoupel (1929–2022), prominent Lithuanian-Israeli cardiologist
- Yehezkel Streichman (1906–1993), Israeli painter
- Chiune Sugihara (1900–1986), vice-consul for the Japanese Empire in Kaunas in WW2
- Gintautas Umaras (born 1963), retired Olympic track and road racing cyclist
- Lukas Verzbicas (born 1993), American long-distance runner and triathlete
- Jonas Vileišis (1872–1942), lawyer, politician, and diplomat
- Edita Vilkevičiūtė (born 1989), model
- Andrius Zakarauskas (born 1982), painter
- Vytautas Žalakevičius (1930–1996), film director and screen writer
- Marius Žaliūkas (1983–2020), professional footballer
- L. L. Zamenhof (1859–1917), inventor of the Esperanto language
