= Adomas Danusevičius =

Lithuanian artist

Adomas Danusevičius (born 1984) is a Lithuanian artist. He studied painting at Vilnius Academy of Arts; in 2017 he was a doctoral student there. He made his debut in the Lithuanian contemporary art scene during his years of study.

== Awards ==
- 2012 Public Prize at international contest 'Young painters prize'12', Vilnius, Lithuania
- 2009 'Award of Dalia Gruodiene', Vilnius, Lithuania

== Solo shows ==
- 2008 'Carmine', paintings exhibition by Adomas Danusevicius and Alina Melnikova, gallery 'Tulips&Roses', Vilnius, Lithuania
- 2012 'Paintings by Adomas Danusevicius', gallery 'Vartai', Vilnius, Lithuania
- 2012 'Carmine', gallery 'Larm', Copenhagen, Denmark
- 2014 'Camouflage Masculinity', Culture and Communication center, Klaipėda, Lithuania
- 2014 'Camouflage Masculinity', VDU gallery 101, Kaunas, Lithuania
- 2014 'Camouflage Masculinity', Oslo house gallery, Vilnius, Lithuania
- 2015 The Camp &The Beautiful, Atelier am Eck, Düsseldorf, Germany
- 2017 Penis Mushroom Series, The Rooster Gallery, Vilnius, Lithuania
- 2017 'Camouflage Masculinity and Campish Dazzle', Titanic exhibition hall, Vilnius, Lithuania
