= Leonardas Kazokas =

Lithuanian painter

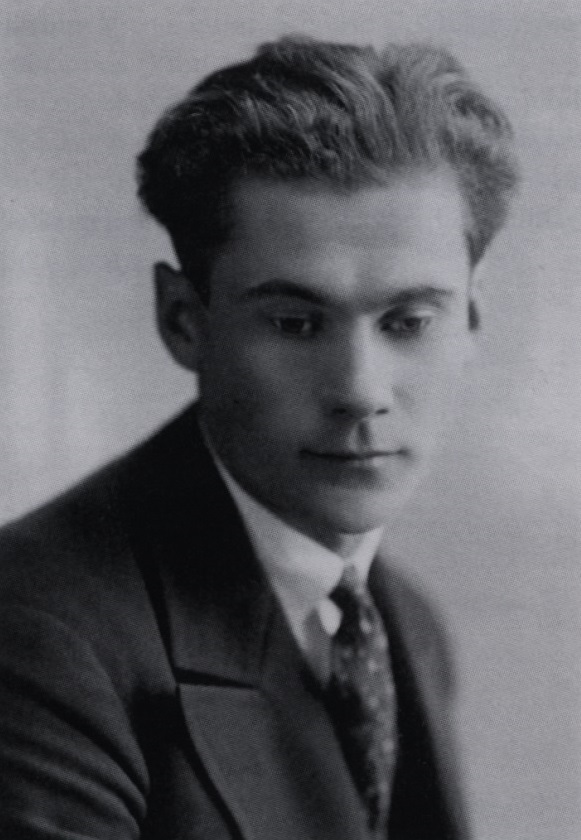
- Leonardas Kazokas in 1925
- Born: Leonardas Kazakevičius; 27 July 1905; Kaunas, Russian Empire
- Died: 15 August 1981 (aged 76); Kaunas, Lithuanian SSR, Soviet Union
- Education: Kaunas School of Arts; Vilnius Academy of Arts
- Known for: Painting
- Style: Expressionism

Leonardas Kazokas (27 July 1905 – 15 August 1981) was a Lithuanian expressionist painter.

== Biography ==
=== Early life ===
Kazokas was born on as Leonardas Kazakevičius on 27 July 1905 in Kaunas, then a city of the Russian Empire. At the beginning of the First World War, he and his family moved to St. Petersburg. They returned to Kaunas in 1921. Kazokas then settled in Šančiai, where he became employed in the Šimkūno fotografija atelier, where he would create colorful portraits out of pictures. Kazokas continued studying drawing in the city, as well as sculpting with Vincas Grybas. Kazokas specialized in sculpting the head, while Grybas specialized in sculpting body.

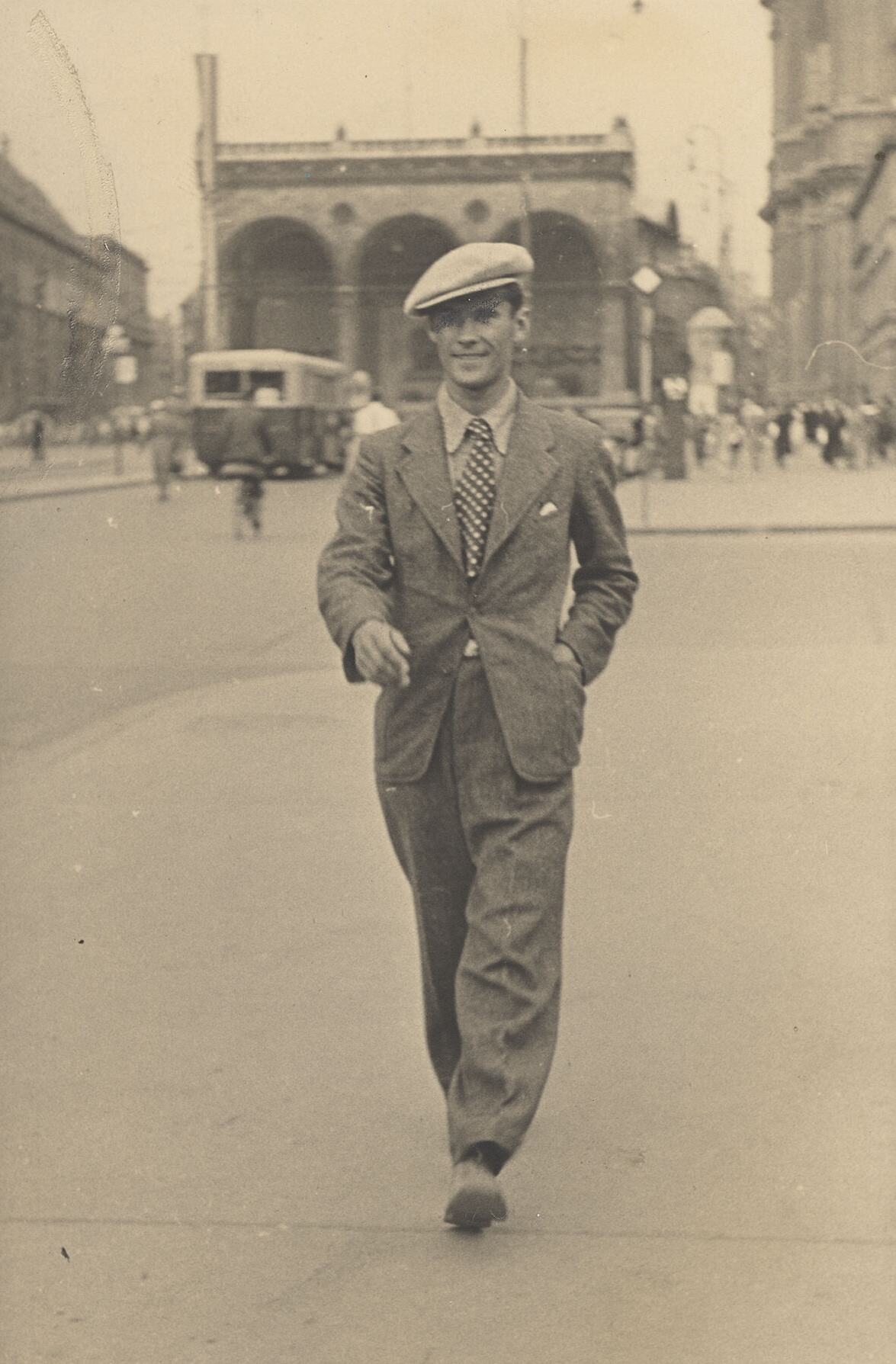
Leonardas Kazokas in Paris, 1938

=== Interwar Lithuania ===
Kazokas then studied at the Kaunas Art School from its inception in 1922 until 1929 under Justinas Vienožinskis. A year after graduation, in 1930, Kazokas became one of the founders of the Independent Painters Society, serving first as its vice-chairman, and then as chairman from 1933. Kazokas left for Paris to study in 1930, where he mastered his skills at private studios or independently. After returning to Lithuania in 1934, Kazokas lectured on drawing in the Kaunas 3rd State Gymnasium (now the Gediminas Gymnasium of Sports and Health Promotion). From 1934 onwards, Kazokas organized six personal exhibitions.

=== Soviet occupation and later years ===
In 1940, after the occupation of Lithuania by the Soviet Union, Kazokas was the deputy chairman of the art commission that was preparing for the celebration of the October Revolution in Kaunas. In 1941 Kazokas was chairman of the art commission in Vilnius for the celebration of International Workers' Day. From 1941 to 1944, Kazokas served as the chairman of the Kaunas art combine Dailė. After graduating from the Vilnius Academy of Arts with an external degree in 1944, Kazokas went back to lecture at the Kaunas School of Arts, then called the Kaunas Institute of Applied and Decorative Arts. Kazokas headed the drawing department, was a patron of the student scientific society, lectured at scientific conferences, and actively participated in exhibitions. Among his students were Augustinas Savickas (son of Jurgis Savickis), Sofija Veiverytė, Jadvyga Mozūraitė-Klemkienė, and others. In 1951 Kazokas switched back to working as a painter at the Dailė combine.

In 1961, Kazokas became heavily ill, losing his right arm due to the sickness. In 1965 he was awarded a medal for "good work and active social activities", and in 1975 was awarded the honorary title of Meritorious Artistic Figure of the Lithuanian SSR. Kazokas died on 15 August 1981 in Kaunas.

== Paintings ==
Kazokas's work is described as expressionist. Kazokas frequently traveled during his summer holidays to places such as Lithuania Minor, Sweden, Norway, Belgium, France, England, and East Prussia. Those places served as inspirations for various Kazokas's paintings. A melancholy, dreamy mood, as well as "silver soft tones" are attributed to Kazokas's early work. His later work, in particular after his return from Paris, is characterized by decorativeness, expressionism, as well with richer more varied color. After the Second World War, Kazokas began painting more realistic, panoramic views, which contrasted with the lyrical landscape style he mastered. In comparison to Kazokas's colorful Paris cityscape paintings, the landscapes created when he returned to Kaunas gained a considerably greyer look. Kazokas also painted portraits, still life, landscape, and thematic paintings. According to art critic Gintaras Baltinas, Kazokas "combined the archaic values of the spirit of the nation with the discoveries of modern art and laid the foundations of contemporary art".

His works are housed in the M. K. Čiurlionis National Art Museum and the National Gallery of Art.

== Posthumous remembrance ==
In 1985, a memorial plate was hung at Kazokas's former home in Kaunas. The plate was re-made in 2017. Kazokas's works were put on display at the Kaunas Picture Gallery in 2005. In 2008, a book dedicated to Kazokas was released.
