= Danas Andriulionis =

Lithuanian painter (1951–2023)

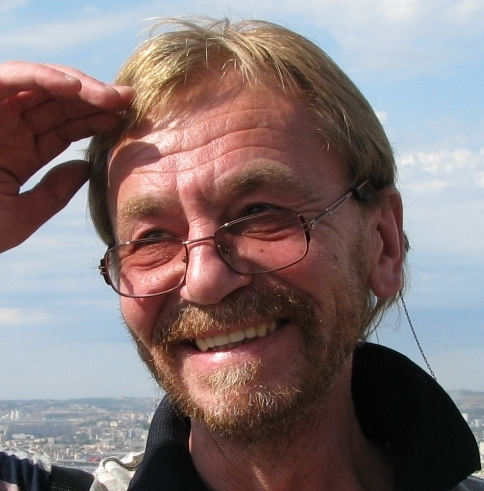

Danas Andriulionis (25 November 1951 – 4 September 2023) was a Lithuanian painter and a member of the Lithuanian Artists' Association.

== Biography ==
Andriulionis studied in Pakruojis, and graduated from Rokiškis T. Vaižgantas school. In 1975, he joined the VISI, specialising in architecture, and in 1979 graduated from the Vilnius Art Academy, specialising in art design. From 2001, he was a teacher of painting composition. He died on 4 September 2023, at the age of 71.

== Creative activities ==
Andriulionis exhibited at more than 300 different exhibitions and projects since 1992. He arranged more than 60 personal exhibitions and took part in joint exhibitions with prominent Lithuanian and foreign artists in France (1992), Denmark (2000), USA (2002), Hungary (2003), Sweden (2005), Finland (2005), Russia (2006), Poland (2006), Latvia (2007), and Spain (2008). International exhibitions he participated in include Klaipeda Art Exhibition Hall and Baroti Gallery (2001, 2005), "Baptism in the art" (Klaipeda, 2002, 2003), "Quo Vadis" (Budapest, Hungary, 2003), exhibition "Vilius Orvydai remember" (Kėdainių 2005), "Signs of the Time" (Klaipeda, 2006), "Christmas exhibition" (Klaipeda, 2006), the exhibition "Minor Lithuania paintings garden“ (Bitėnai, Šilutės, 2006), "Mega Plaza" (Klaipeda, 2007), "V world Samogitians" exhibition (Plunge, 2007), Project "Aquarium" (Klaipeda, 2001), "Year horizon 04" (Klaipeda, 2005), "Wind and Sea" (Stockholm, Sweden, 2005), and "Flight Stroke" (Klaipeda, 2008).

== Later career ==
In 2005, Andriulionis was granted the status of Art Creator of the Republic of Lithuania, and was awarded more than 40 letters of appreciation and prizes. He created scenography for four theatre productions and co-wrote the book "On Wings of Music" in 2008. He was actively involved in Klaipeda and Lithuania's creative life and was a member of the painters' group "INDIVIDUALISTS".

Andriulionis' work is held in six museums and in private collections worldwide.

== Bibliography ==
Klaipėda and Klaipėda, Time labelled Volume II, in 2013, Vilnius. p. 96 Who is who in Lithuania, Gold Millennium Edition, 2009, Kaunas. p. 378 Who is who in Lithuania, Lithuanian State Yearbook 1990-2010, p. 176.
