= Gražina Didelytė =

- Born: Gražina Didelytė; 2 October 1938; Kaunas, Lithuania
- Died: 2 January 2007 (aged 68); Vilnius, Lithuania
- Resting place: Rasos Cemetery
- Citizenship: Lithuania
- Education: Lithuanian Institution of Arts
- Occupations: Graphic artist, book illustrator
- Years active: 1968–2006
- Notable work: Skroblaus vingiai, Dainavos klodai

Gražina Didelytė-Abaravičienė (2 October, 1938 – January 2, 2007) was a Lithuanian graphic artist and book illustrator.

== Biography ==
Gražina Didelytė has born in a suburban (at that time) area of Kaunas in 1938. She graduated Kaunas Salomėja Nėris secondary school in 1957. Later she studied chemistry in Kaunas Polytechnic Institute but joined Lithuanian Institution of Arts in 1961 and graduated graphics subject there in 1967.

Since 1968 Didelytė began her career as an artist. She participated in local and foreign expositions, illustrated books, designed bookplates. During the 1970s–1980s she actively participated in ethnographic expeditions, folk festivals, hikes through important historical places in Lithuania. Because of this activity, she was investigated by Soviet security organizations.

1977 Didelytė moved from Kaunas to Vilnius, where she got a studio. Later she often camped in Dzūkija region and bought a homestead in Rudnia (Rudnelė) village. Since 1995 till 2006 she lived in remote Rudnia village permanently (at times all alone in the whole village) and opened her gallery "Andeinė" there in 2005.

In October 2006 she got injured and left for Vilnius where she died next year.

== Works ==
Gražina Didelytė participated in around 30 expositions in Lithuania, Czechoslovakia (in 1977, 1983), Poland (in 1977), Latvia (in 1984–85), Finland (in 1993–94), Japan (in 1996). She designed around 700 bookplates, also many art prints (etching cycles "Song about Tree" in 1970, "Lithuania of Svirskis" in 1975, "Oh, Homeland" in 1976, "In memoriam Vincas Mykolaitis-Putinas" in 1978, "Moments" in 1982, "The Rudnia Marsh" in 1991), fine graphics works, book illustrations (for the poetry books of Justinas Marcinkevičius, Kazys Bradūnas, Aldona Puišytė, Gintautas Iešmantas, Česlovas Masaitis, Algimantas Baltakis and others). During her stay in Rudnelė, she created a cycle dedicated to the local nature the Dainavos klodai ('The Dainava Stratum').

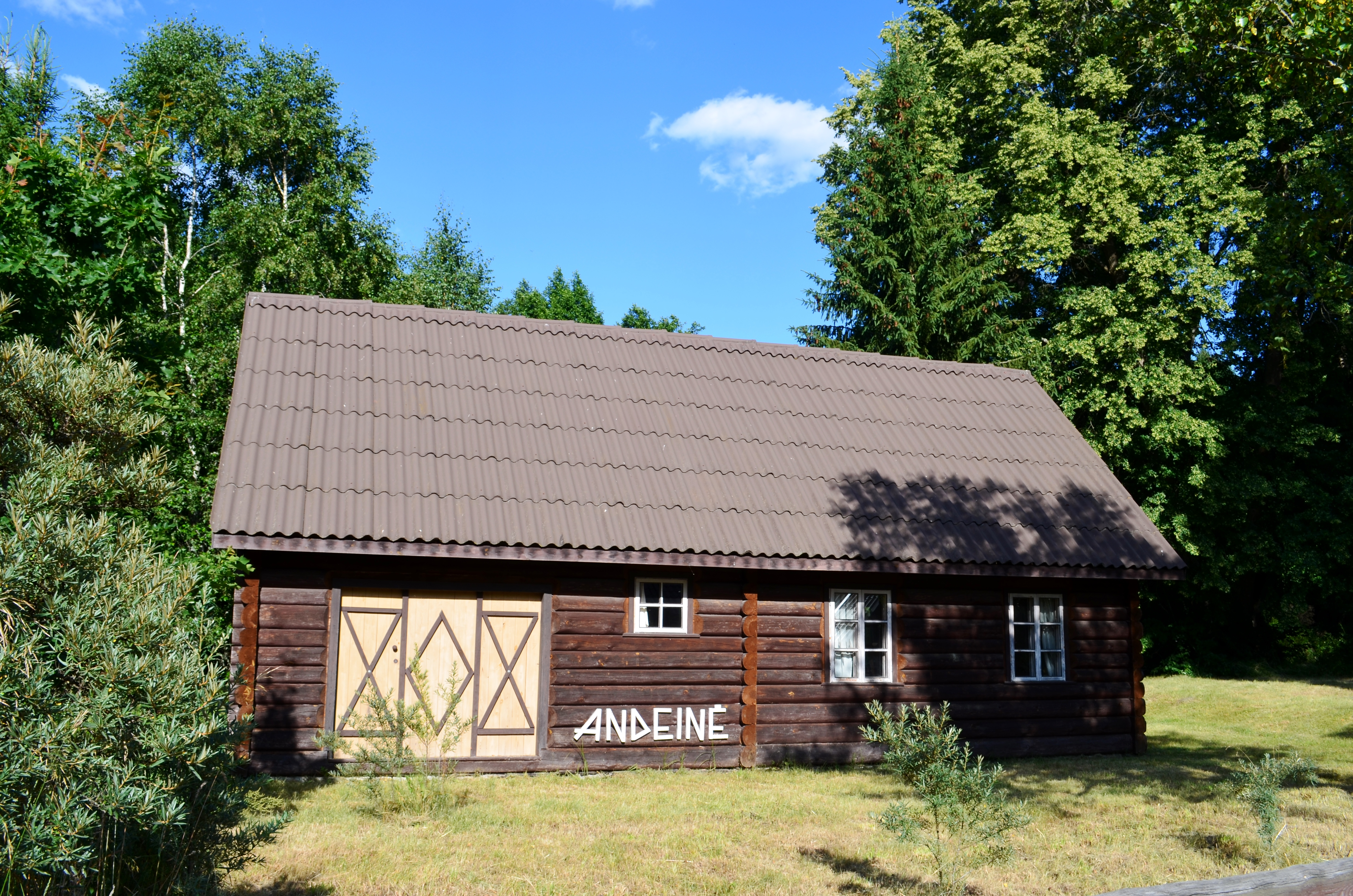
G. Didelytė gallery Andeinė in Rudnia village

Didelytė employs metaphoric style depicting inner human emotions, mythical, ethnographical motives, nature elements. Some later her works explore exile and post-war resistance themes.
