= Albert Sack =

American antiques dealer (1915–2011)

- Born: Albert Milton Sack; March 24, 1915; Lynn, Massachusetts, U.S.
- Died: May 29, 2011 (aged 96); Durham, North Carolina, U.S.
- Education: University of Pennsylvania
- Occupation: Antiques dealer
- Father: Israel Sack

Albert Milton Sack (March 24, 1915 – May 29, 2011) was an American antiques dealer and author. He was the son of antiques dealer Israel Sack. He wrote a popular reference book on early American antique furniture — "the bible for a generation of weekend antiquers and a standard for professional collectors" according to the New York Times.

== Early life and education ==
Sack was born on March 24, 1915, in Lynn, Massachusetts. He was the second and middle son of Israel and Ann Sack.

He attended the University of Pennsylvania but had to leave school when the Great Depression damaged his father’s business, so he was needed to help.

== Author, antiques dealer and appraiser ==
In 1948, Albert Sack wrote an article, "Good, Better, Best", which was published in The Magazine Antique. Editor Alice Winchester asked Sack to expand it into a book.

The resulting book, Fine Points of Furniture: Early American, was originally published in 1950, and has been called the "definitive reference book for antique dealers." It became a bestseller, and was reprinted 24 times.

In 1993, he co-authored a sequel with his protégée, Atlanta antique dealer Deanne Levison. Entitled The New Fine Points of Furniture, it was updated and revised to include the categories of “superior” and “masterpiece", and became an "essential text" in the business. (Note: "These books are the comparative touchstone for the study of American furniture design, and have taught would-be connoisseurs how to look at objects and refine their eye. These books set forth a process that Albert calls the test of quality the initial judgment phase by which a pieces aesthetic merits are assessed before any other factors such as age, rarity, or historic associations can be considered.")

While summarizing his professional standards, Albert Sack hearkened back to his father's counsel. "Everything ... was from the standpoint of the inspiration and talent of the craftsman ... A truly great craftsman had a god-given talent that transcended that of most of his peers." (Note: "In recognition of this, I saw my father turn down great furniture if he thought it was out of proportion or if the craftsmanship was mediocre. He loved beautiful forms and created some of the greatest museum and private collections yet known.") Sack posited that American furniture epitomized "what America started out to be, was, and is. It is a tangible historical product, free and unleashed from its European roots."

This led to the Sacks firm's publication of the serial volumes American Antiques from the Israel Sack Collection which helped professionalize the antique trade in America. This goal was further fostered by a rich schedule of appearances and lectures, accompanied by "glamorous, gallery-style installations."

He was a regular contributor/appraiser at The Antiques Roadshow on the PBS.

His wordsmithing, gift of description and judgment have been favorably reviewed. They were deemed seductive:

"When Albert Sack describes a piece of furniture, it comes to life. One can never look at a hotel room reproduction without feeling offended, on a deep level, by its ugly, shiny newness. One wants patina after reading Albert Sack. One wants age and mellow wood and the evidence of human hands rubbing the edges of a thing. One wants a perfect curve to its leg."

He was a furniture advisor to the White House during the presidency of Dwight D. Eisenhower and he donated a sofa to the Diplomatic Reception Room.

== Influence and philanthropy ==
In 1934 he joined Israel Sack, Inc, which was moving from Boston to New York City. His older brother Harold worked at the firm, too. From 1942 until 1946 he served in the United States Army. Upon detachment, he rejoined the firm of Israel Sack until it closed in 2002. Declining to retire, at age 87, he then matriculated to Northeast Auctions, working for three years.

According to The Washington Post, Sack's firm was "reputed to have invented the American antique market."

He and his father were influential in steering their clients to gift important American pieces of furniture to American Museums. This cast an indelible mark of "masterpieces of our heritage" in the public mind. Further, Albert donated a vast collection of photographs and related ephemera of antique furniture to the Yale University Art Gallery. which had a palpable effect on research and scholarship in the field. (Note: "Both of these antique dealers raised American antique furniture on a pedestal as 'Objects of Desire' and later convinced their clients to donate their collection to American museums. So now, all citizens will equate 18th American furniture as some of the masterpieces of our heritage. Albert Sack should also be remembered for his donation of 7,000 black and white photographs of all antique furniture bought and sold by Israel Sack Inc. in its 100-year history, and the notes and research used in publication of books and articles published by the company. That donation to the Yale University Art Gallery (i.e. Rhode Island Furniture) has vastly increased the resources available to a new generation of collectors, dealers, and scholars and encouraged a new level of scholarship and research on American furniture.")

He, his older brother, and the firm created the "Israel Sack Galleries" at the Metropolitan Museum of Art.

Donated by the family in 2011, the Sack Family Archive and the Israel Sack, Inc., Archive are reposed at the Yale University Library and the Yale Art Gallery.

== Death and legacy ==
He died on May 29, 2011, in Durham, North Carolina at age 96. He had been treated by hospice at Duke University Hospital for several months. He was the last survivor of the family firm. Israel Sack, Inc., had sold more than 2,600 objects during its century-long existence.

In 1996, the Winterthur Museum, Garden and Library awarded the Henry Francis du Pont Award posthumously to Sack and his three sons for having “dedicated themselves to the connoisseurship, preservation, and collecting of American furniture.”

In his memory, the Antiques Dealers' Association of America hosted a tribute and memorial in January 2012 in the Tiffany Room at the Park Avenue Armory. This was conjoined with the Winter Antiques Show. Albert Sack was the first recipient of the ADA Award of Merit.

== Published works ==
- Sack, Albert (1993). The New Fine Points of Furniture: Early American, Good, Better, Best, Superior, Masterpiece (Hardcover). United States: Crown Publishers. ISBN 9780517588208. "A guide to comparing and evaluating early American antiques compares furniture similar in form but varying in proportion, craftsmanship, and design and features photographs of chairs, beds, bureaus, clocks, desk, and other items. 20,000 ..."
- Sack, Albert; Levison, Deanne (2007). Fine Points of Furniture: Early American (Paperback). United States: Schiffer Publishing. ISBN 9780764327377.
- Sack, Albert. Israel Sack A Record of Service, 1903-1959. N.p.: n.p., (n.d.).
