= Vytautas Tomaševičius =

Lithuanian painter

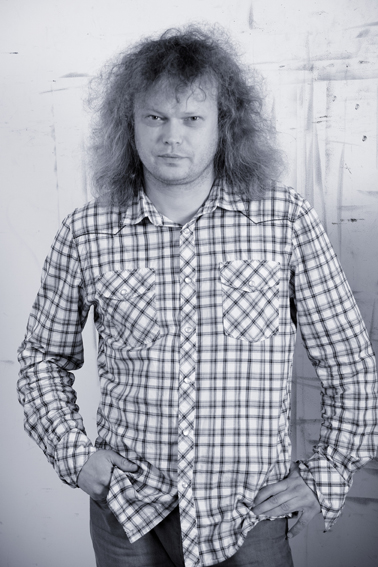
- Born: 1972 (age 53–54); Vilnius, Lithuania
- Education: Vilnius Academy of Arts
- Known for: painting
- Notable work: A Still Life with Two Objects
- Awards: Art Olympia – Excellence Award; 2019 "A Still Life with Two Objects"

Vytautas Tomaševičius (born 1972) is a Lithuanian painter, creating work in Vilnius since the late 1990s. His distinctive style combines a graphite and painted image with an enlarged laser-printed graphic transferred to the painting surface. In 2019 he became the first Lithuanian artist to win the Excellence Award in the Tokyo Art Olympia Biennale.

== Life ==
Tomaševičius was born in Vilnius, Lithuania, in 1972, to a Lithuanian mother and Polish father. He graduated in 1989 from Vilnius J. Vienožinskis Art School, and in 1998 from the Vilnius Academy of Arts, majoring in painting and theatre set design. He lives and works in Vilnius.

== Film ==
Since 1995 Tomaševičius has worked as a set designer for international film and TV projects. His work included creating sets and costumes for the 1998 Lithuanian film Park Integrity, directed by Dalia Jakubauskaitė, and sets for the 2001 Werner Herzog film Invincible. More recently, he has devoted himself solely to painting.

== Painting ==
Since 2003 Tomaševičius has held over 20 solo exhibitions in Lithuania, Denmark, and Sweden, and participated in over 50 exhibitions in Lithuania, Denmark, Germany, Switzerland, Sweden, Russia, Italy, and Japan. His first solo exhibition in Lithuania was in ARTima Gallery, Vilnius, in 2007. Currently he collaborates with the galleries VanLoon en Simons (Netherlands) and Galleri Svanlunda (Malmö).

In 2008 Tomaševičius was awarded First Place prize at the Baltic Art Biennial in Saint Petersburg; in competition were 100 artists from the 10 Baltic countries. The five winners were Tomaševičius, fellow Lithuanian Aleksandras Vozbinas, and three other artists from Estonia and Finland.

In 2010 he won a scholarship from the Lithuanian Ministry of Culture and in 2018 one from the Lithuanian Cultural Council.

In 2019 he won an Excellence Award in the Open Category at the third Art Olympia Biennale in Tokyo, with his work A Still Life with Two Objects (2016). More than 5,000 works by nearly 1,800 artists from 100 countries were submitted, of which 270 were selected by an international jury, and only 30 received an Excellence Award. Tomaševičius is the first Lithuanian artist to be awarded this honour.

Tomaševičius's practice currently is a combination of painting and printmaking: a detailed pencil and painted image is overlaid with abstract monochrome patterns, a technique he calls "digital impressionism". The patterns are made from drawings scanned, enlarged, laser-printed, and transferred to the painting's surface.

== Gallery ==
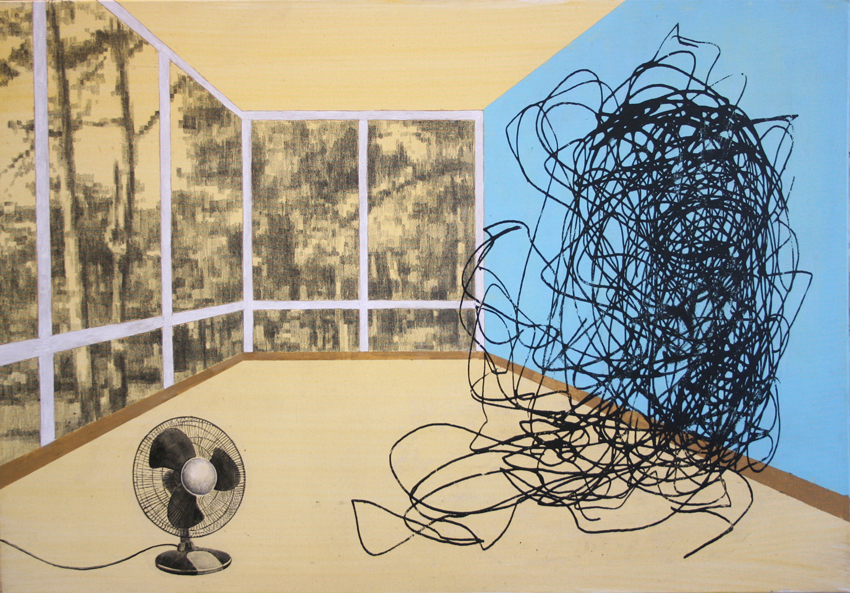
A Still Life with Two Objects (2016)

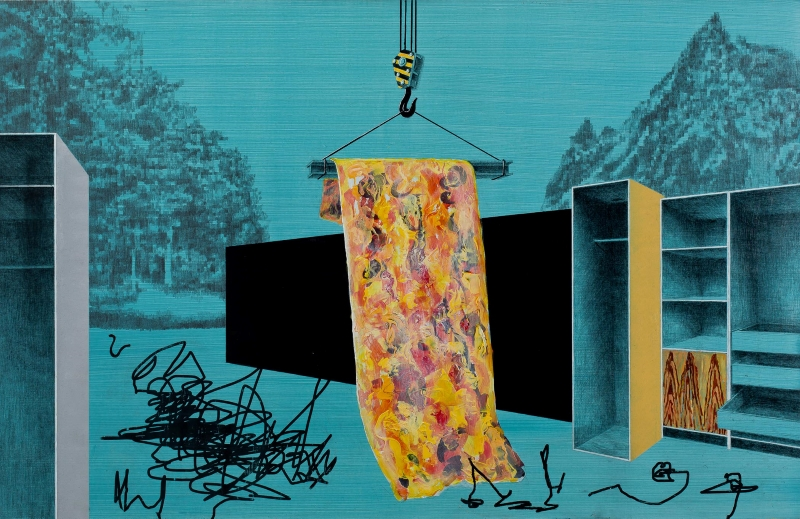
The Exodus From Egypt (2017)

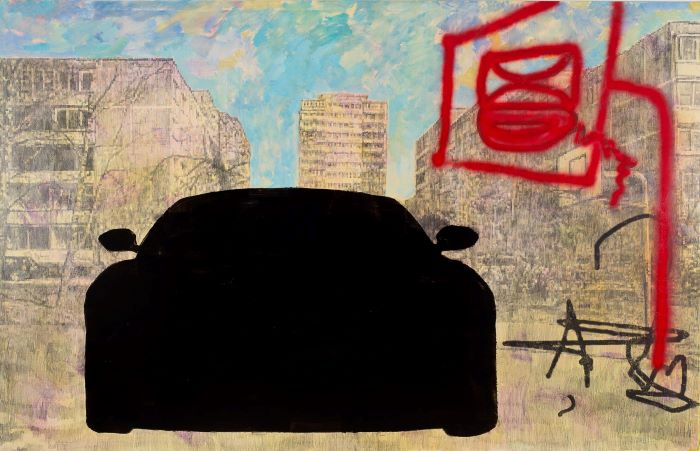
Ferrari in a Basketball Court (2018)

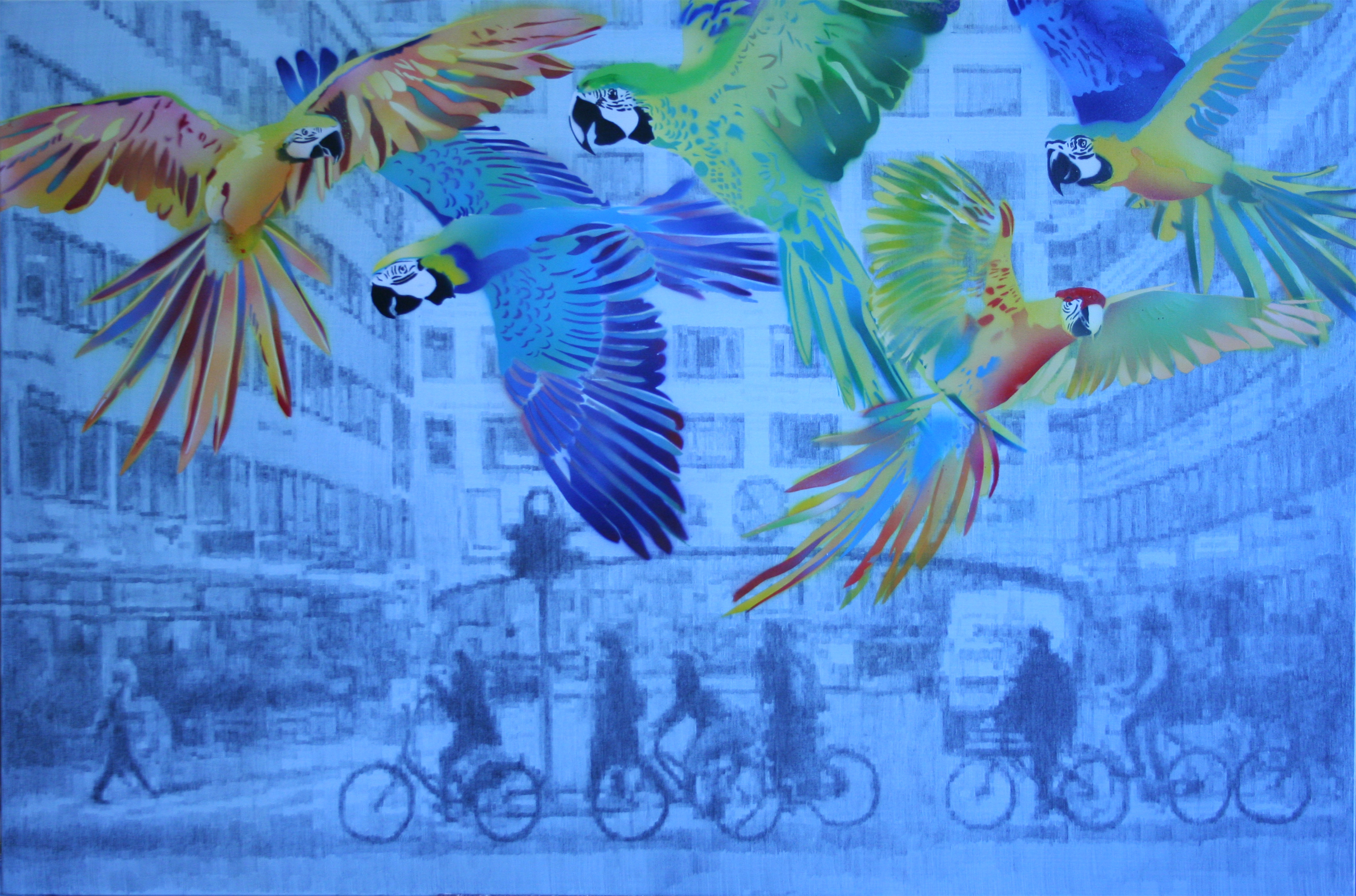
Interception (2020)
