= Kristina Ališauskaitė =

Lithuanian painter

- Born: 1984 (age 41–42); Klaipėda
- Education: Vilnius Academy of Arts
- Known for: Painting
- Awards: Arte Laguna Prize – Kristina Ališauskaitė; 2016 Finalist – Painting 100 painters of tomorrow – Kristina Ališauskaitė; 2014 Finalist – Painting International contest Young painters prize – Kristina Ališauskaitė; 2013 Public Prize – Painting

Kristina Ališauskaitė (born 1984) is a Lithuanian painter.

== Biography ==
She grew up in Klaipėda and later studied painting in Vilnius Academy of Arts. She actively participates in group exhibitions as well as holding solo shows in Lithuania and abroad.

== Awards ==
- 2016 Arte Laguna Prize 2016 - the finalist, Venice, Italy
- 2014 100 painters of tomorrow - the finalist. The book of 100 most promising living painters was released in October 2014 by 'Thames and Hudson'
- 2013 International contest Young painters prize’13 – Public prize, Vilnius, Lithuania
