= Nerijus Glezekas =

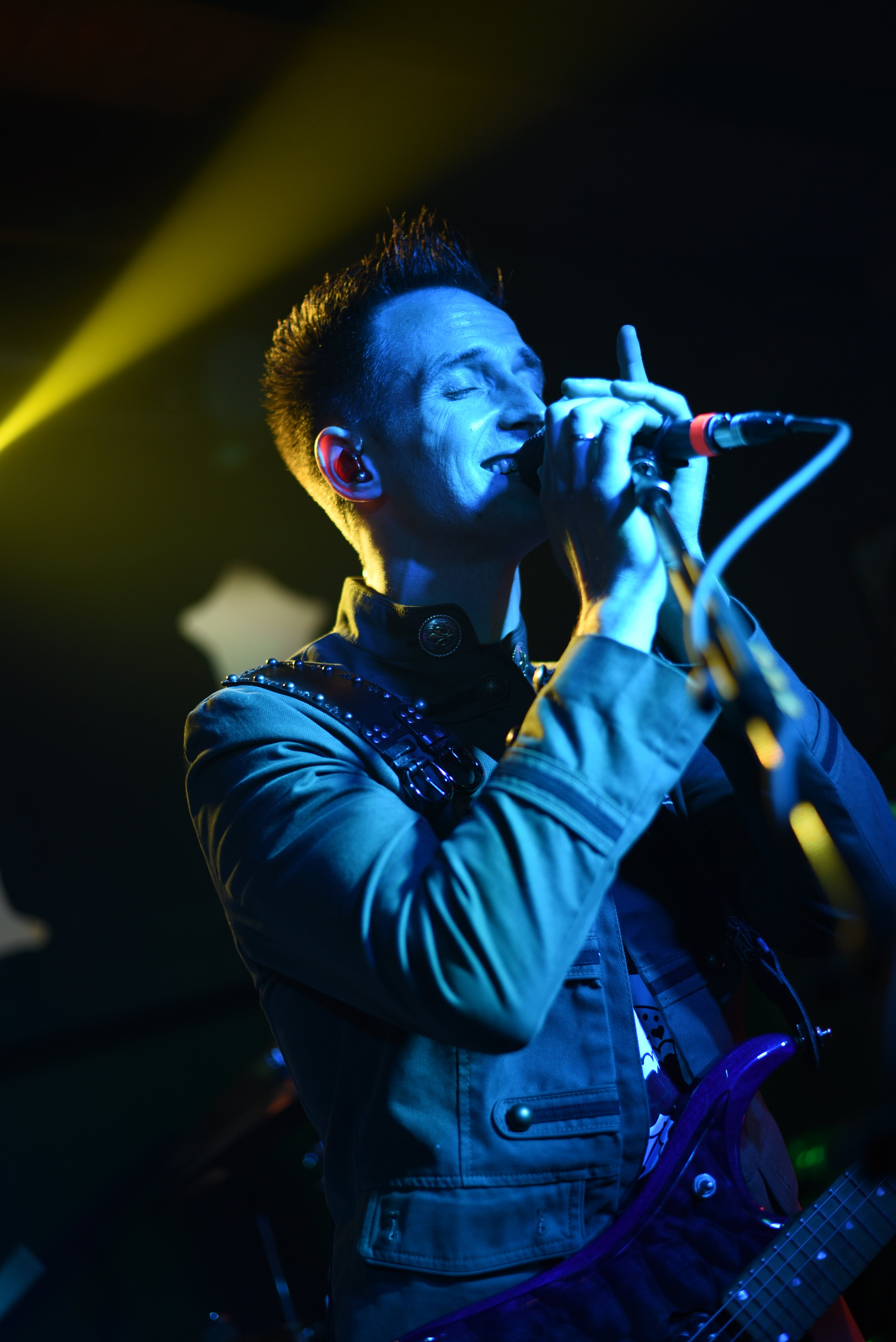

Background information
- Born: 8 April 1985 (age 41); Kaunas, Lithuania
- Genre: Alternative Rock
- Occupations: Musician; Singer; Songwriter; Drummer; Composer
- Instruments: Vocals; Guitar; Drums
- Years active: 2005– present
- Website: nerijusmusic.com

Nerijus Glezekas (born 8 April 1985) is a Lithuanian–American singer, musician, songwriter and an award-winner currently based in Chicago, Illinois.

Glezekas has produced three solo albums with a discography spanning over thirty songs since 2005 and has recorded two full albums with the former band Heart-Set Self Destruct.

== Early life ==
Nerijus Glezekas was born 8 April 1985 in Kaunas, Lithuania. At the age of eight, he received his first drum set and showed a great interest in it. After some guidance from his father, Ernestas Glezeckas, and numerous private lessons, Glezekas had his first musical performance at the age of eight in 1993 that ended in a standing ovation and first article written in next day's newspaper Kauno Diena.

== Life in United States ==
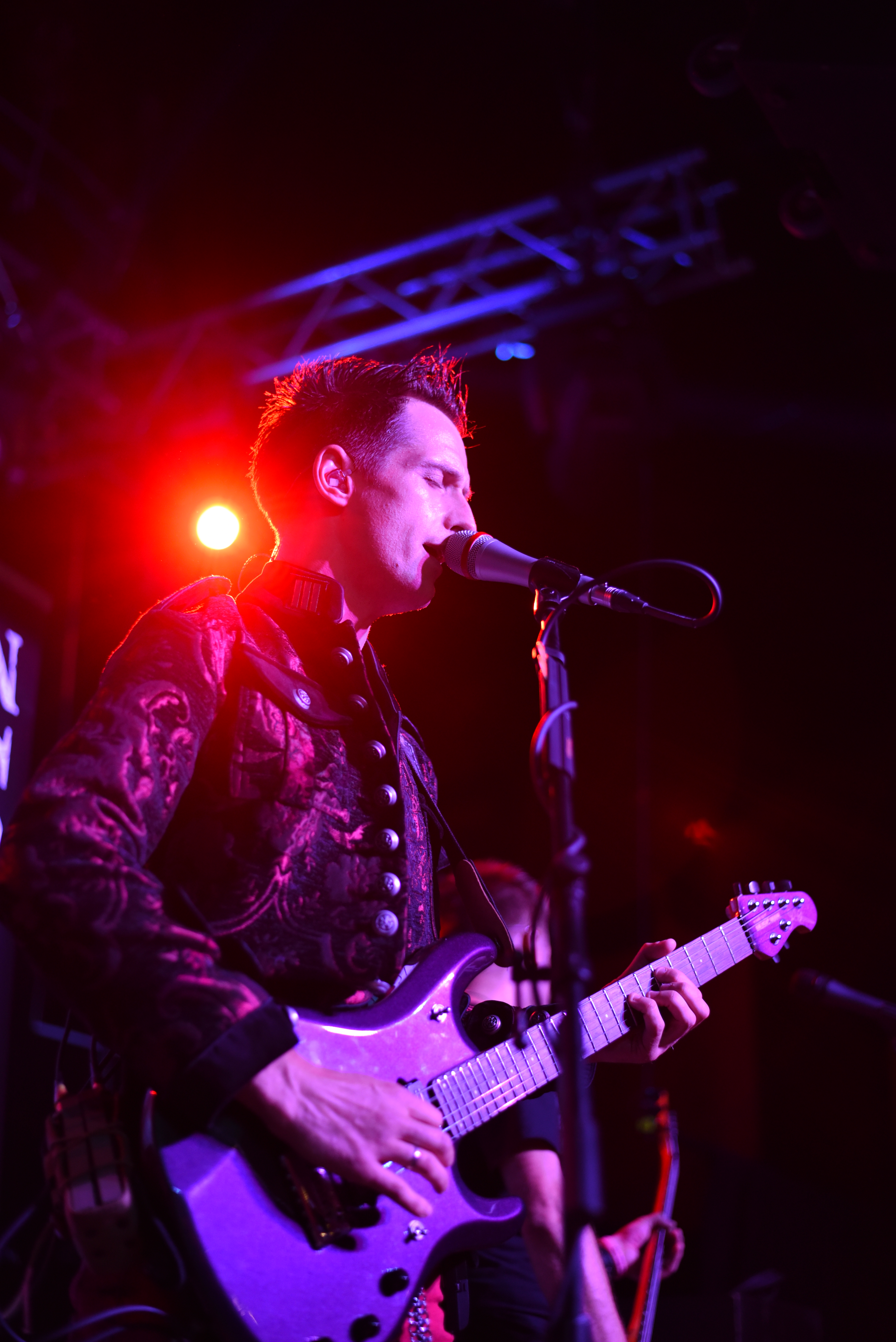
Live Performance

At the age of 16 Glezekas moved to Buffalo Grove, Illinois in 2001 and immediately started looking for the bands to play with. In 2004, Glezekas recorded his first five original songs at Jerry Soto studio Soto Sound Studio. In 2005 he joined newly formed band Heart-Set Self Destruct which accumulated many local shows and numerous national acts. In 2007 Heart-Set Self Destruct released their first album Victims Like Me at Dan Malsch studio Soundmine Studio, PA. In 2008, the band was signed under Soundmine MusicWorks record label. Same year the band played at Vans Warped Tour '08 and many other Midwest shows. In 2009 second album Bridges to Burn was recorded and released. Soon after, Glezekas decided to part ways with Heart-Set Self Destruct and started writing his own original music. The transition from drummer to a vocalist/guitarist was pretty smooth since he already knew how to play guitar and singing came naturally to him. In 2011, Glezekas recorded his first full album Vacant at Black/White Studios (currently known as Formless Audio recording studio). In 2017, he made his debut as an official singer songwriter and recorded his second original album Beyond Simplicity. In 2023, Glezekas released an album Perfect Delusion.

== The Relevant ==
The Relevant was an alternative rock band based in Chicago, Illinois.

Glezekas formed the band in 2017. Gintaras Milius and Ran Romanelli joined as the band's percussionist and lead guitarist, respectively, followed by bassist Matthew Malec and drummer Aaron Allan. The band separated in August 2022.

== Lyrics ==
Glezekas' lyrics incorporate social, historical, political and dystopian themes. Seeds Will Grow, a song inspired by Ukraine's resistance against Russian invasion.

Don't Give Up is a song about Lithuanian partisans and their fight against the Soviets. Nerijus Glezekas' great-grandfather Kazimieras Venckaitis was a secret communicator between Lithuanians. He had played an enormous role in Partisan War against Soviets resulting in disastrous Siberian exile of the whole family. In 1983 K. Venckaitis died without ever seeing a liberated Lithuania. Glezekas had heard this story many times growing up and got inspired to sing about it.

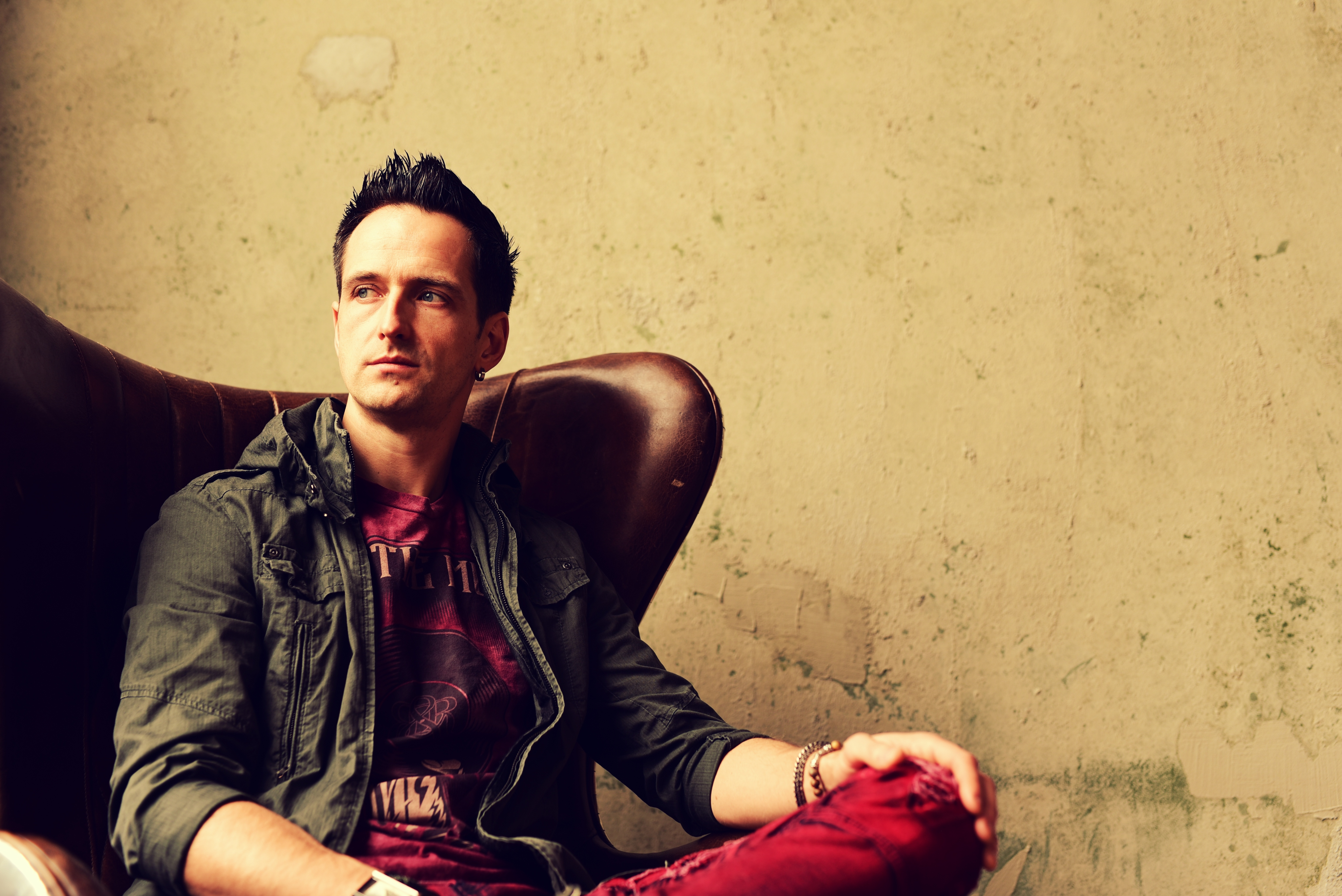

== Awards ==
- Seeds Will Grow was nominated number one rock song in its category and received an award in the 25th annual Great American Song Contest in 2023.
- Seeds Will Grow achieved a title of Finalist in the rock category of John Lennon Songwriting Contest in 2024.

== Discography ==
Heart-Set Self Destruct
Victims Like Me (2007)
Bridges to Burn (2009)

Solo
Vacant (2011)
Beyond Simplicity (2017)
Seeds Will Grow (2022)
Perfect Delusion (2023)
