= Israel Sack =

American antiques dealer (1883–1959)

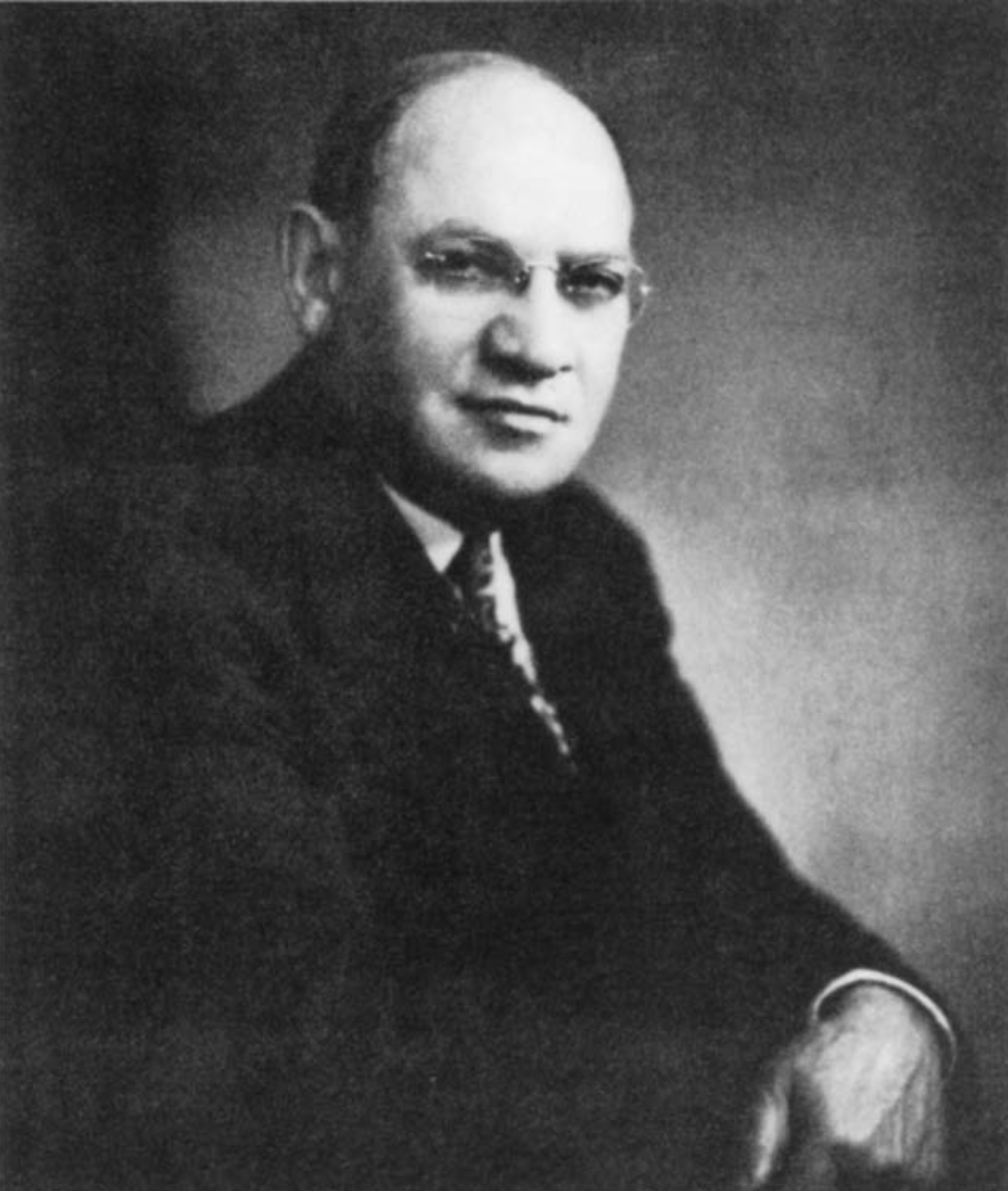
- Sack in 1953
- Born: September 15, 1883; Kaunas, Lithuania, Russian Empire
- Died: May 4, 1959 (aged 75); Brookline, Massachusetts, U.S.
- Citizenship: American
- Occupation: Antiques dealer
- Known for: Supplying antique furniture to America's major private and museum collections
- Children: Harold Sack, Albert Sack, Rosalie Sack, Robert Sack

Israel Sack (September 15, 1883 – May 4, 1959) was a Lithuanian American antiques dealer specializing in early American furniture. Sack was instrumental in developing the private collections of Henry Ford, Henry Francis du Pont, Ima Hogg, and other leading collectors and supplying the Americana collections of "virtually every major museum in the country" per The New York Times. According to The Washington Post, Sack's firm was "reputed to have invented the American antique market."

== Life and career ==
Born into a Lithuanian Jewish merchant family in Kaunas, Lithuania, then part of the Russian Empire, Sack left school at age fourteen to become a cabinetmaker. Evading Russian army conscription, he emigrated to London and then to Boston, arriving in the United States in 1903. He spent two years working for a Scottish Boston cabinetmaker who routinely counterfeited antiques. Sack soon established his own cabinetmaking business on Charles Street in Boston and quickly earned a nationwide reputation for locating, restoring, and delivering top-quality antiques to private collectors and museums. In 1910, he married Ann Goodman, a Jewish Bostonian who had immigrated to the United States from Russia as a child. In 1924, Sack purchased the King Hooper House in Marblehead, Massachusetts, and turned the 18th-century mansion into a showroom for his antiques. Sack relocated his struggling firm to Manhattan in 1934 during the Great Depression. The antiques market recovered after World War II.

In addition to his private clientele, Sack sourced furniture and decorative arts for museums and future museum collections at Winterthur Museum, The Henry Ford, Bayou Bend, the Museum of Fine Arts in Boston, the "Israel Sack Galleries" American Wing at the Metropolitan Museum of Art, Yale University Art Gallery, Nelson-Atkins Museum of Art, Detroit Institute of Arts, Art Institute of Chicago, Hood Museum of Art, Colonial Williamsburg, Wayside Inn, New-York Historical Society, and the White House.

His aesthetic approach to American furniture, which prized line, form, and proportion over the more ornate decoration favored by European furniture-makers, shaped America's antiques market. Albert Sack codified his father's approach in Fine Points of Furniture: Early American, published in 1950 and reissued in 1993 as the "first practical guide to connoisseurship in the field."

Israel Sack and his son, Albert Sack, were influential in steering their clients to gift important American pieces of furniture to American Museums. This cast an indelible mark of "masterpieces of our heritage" in the public mind. Further, Albert donated a vast collection of photographs and related ephemera of antique furniture to the Yale University Art Gallery. which had a palpable effect on research and scholarship in the field.

== Death and legacy ==
On May 4, 1959, Sack died at Brooks Memorial Hospital in Brookline, Massachusetts. He had retired two years earlier and maintained a home in Brookline. He was survived by his wife of 49 years. His sons, Harold, Albert, and Robert Sack, carried on the family business after their father's death. Harold memorialized his father in the book American Treasure Hunt: The Legacy of Israel Sack (Little, Brown and Co., 1987). Harold also served as an advisor to Henry Francis du Pont, chair of the committee that presided over the redecoration of the White House under the direction of First Lady Jacqueline Kennedy. Israel Sack, Inc., went out of business in 2002, still "regarded as the preeminent specialist in antique American furniture and a model of ethical and aesthetic standards." Israel Sack's last surviving son, Albert, died in 2011 at age 96.

In 1996, the Winterthur Museum, Garden and Library awarded the Henry Francis du Pont Award posthumously to Sack and his three sons for having "dedicated themselves to the connoisseurship, preservation, and collecting of American furniture." Israel Sack, Inc., had sold more than 2,600 objects during its century-long existence.

Sack was one of many early 20th-century New England- and New York-based antiques dealers who were Jewish immigrants from Eastern and Central Europe.

Donated by the family in 2011, the Sack Family Archive and the Israel Sack, Inc., Archive are held by Yale University Library and the Yale Art Gallery.
