= Andrius Zakarauskas =

Lithuanian painter

Andrius Zakarauskas (born 1982) is a painter from Lithuania.

== Biography ==
Zakarauskas was born and raised in Kaunas. He later studied at Vilnius Academy of Arts. Since 2005 he has held solo shows in Lithuania as well as abroad.

== Awards ==
In 2009 he won the "Young Painter Prize" in Lithuania.
