= Vilnius Academy of Arts =

Art school in Vilnius, Lithuania

Coordinates: 54°40′54″N 23°17′45″E

- Vilniaus dailės akademija
- Latin: Academiae Artium Vilnensis
- Type: Public
- Established: 1793; 233 years ago
- Rector: Ieva Skauronė
- Academic staff: 350+
- Students: 1540+
- Location: Vilnius, Lithuania
- Campus: urban
- Website: vda.lt

The Vilnius Academy of Arts (Lithuanian: Vilniaus dailės akademija, previously State Art Institute of Lithuania) in Vilnius, Lithuania, grants a variety of degrees in the arts.

== History ==
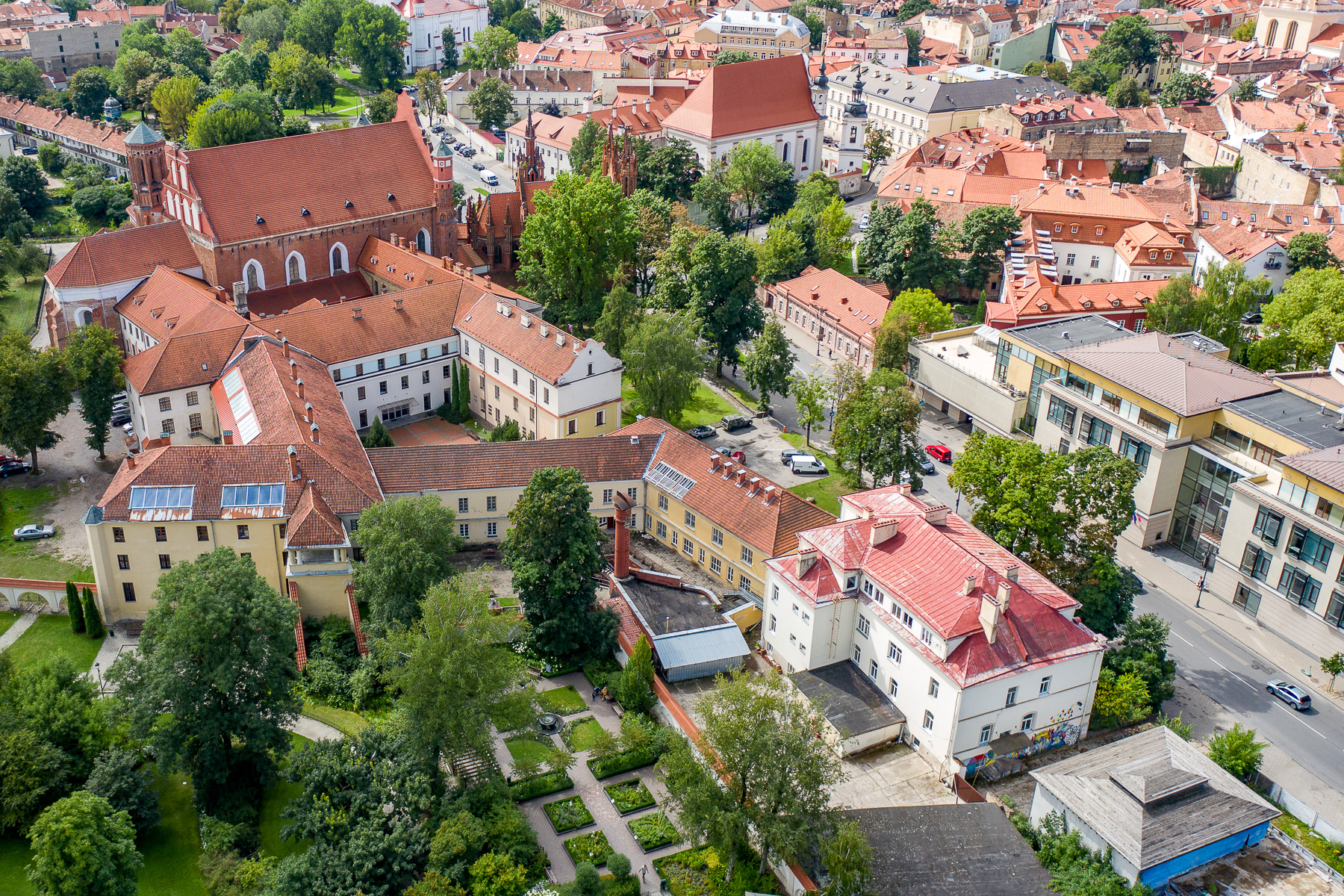
VDA Campus in Vilnius

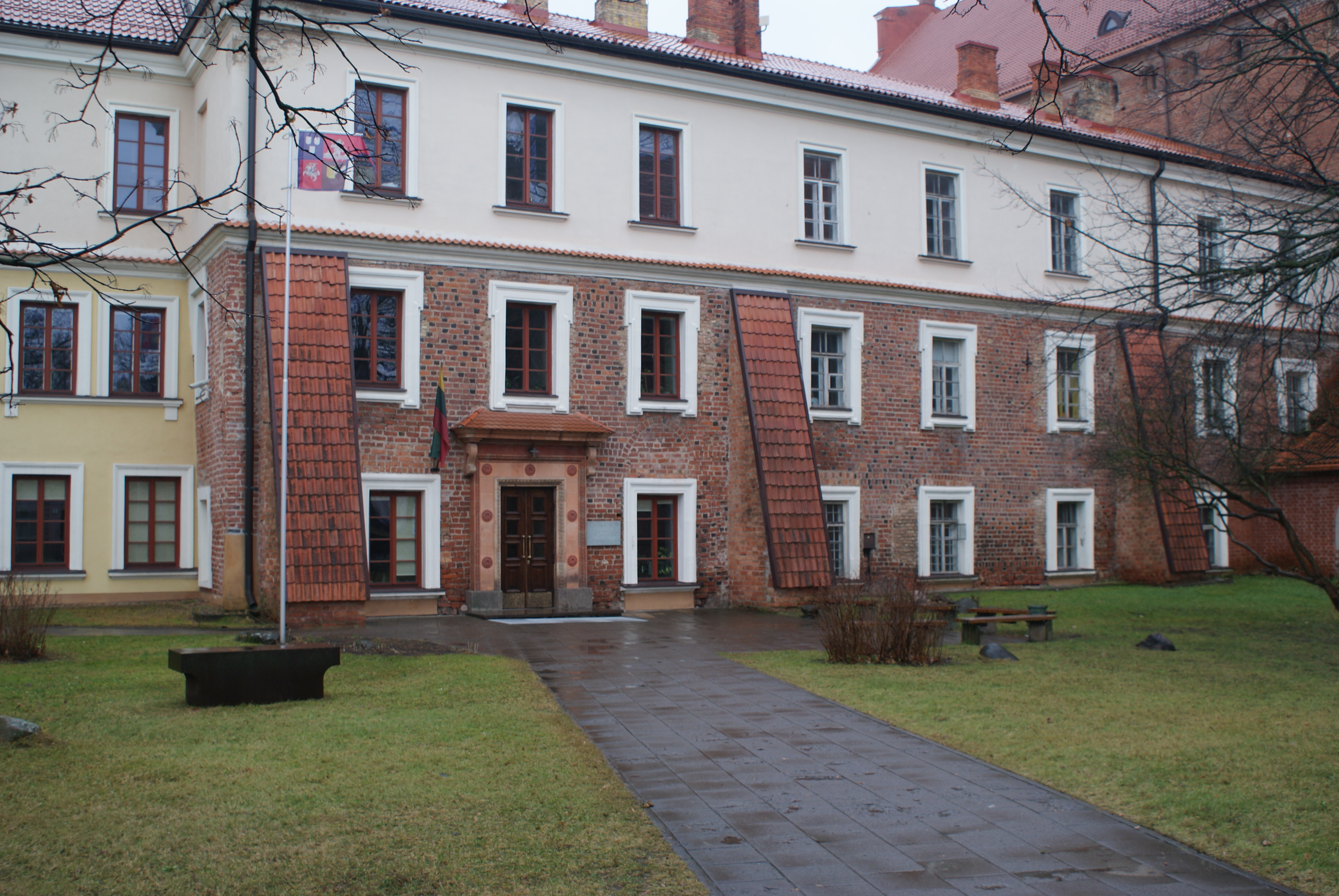

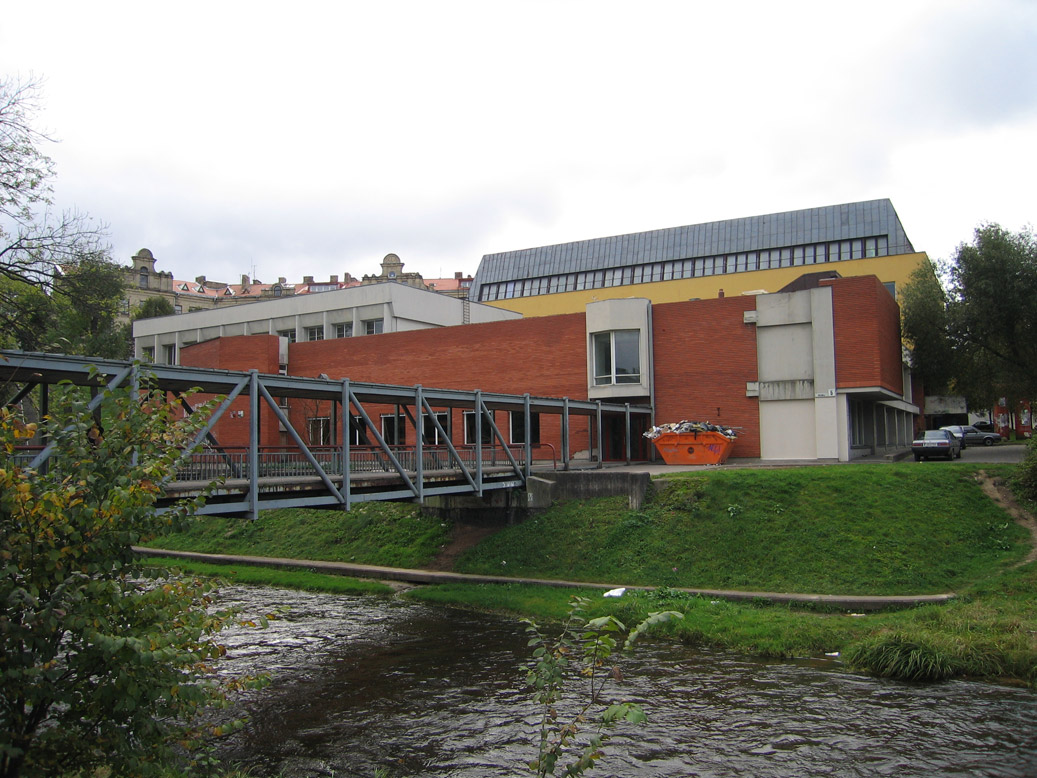
Building 'C' of the Academy at Vilnia River in Užupis. Built in 1981, architects Vytautas Brėdikis, Bronius Kazlauskas, Vladislovas Mikučianis, Vytautas Nasvytis.

The Academy traces its roots back to the creation of the Architecture Department at Vilnius University in the former Grand Duchy of Lithuania in 1793. The Department of Painting and Drawing was established in 1797, followed by the Department of Graphics (Engraving), and in 1805 – the Departments of Sculpture and History of art. In 1832, the university was closed, and reopened in 1919 with departments of Painting, Sculpture and Graphic Art. In 1940, the art studies in Lithuania were united under Vilnius Art Institute and Kaunas Art School. Later, the Academy saw several re-organisations, and in 1990 the name of Vilnius Academy of Arts was reinstated.

The academy began working with UNESCO in 2000, when the UNESCO department of culture management and culture policy was created.

The museum of the Academy holds about 12,000 pieces, ranging from the 16th century to the works of its most recent students and graduates.

== Alumni ==
- Kristina Ališauskaitė
- Danas Andriulionis, Lithuanian artist
- Rūta Jokubonienė
- Vytautas Tomaševičius
- Gražina Didelytė
- Algis Uždavinys
- Jurga Ivanauskaitė
- Kristina Sabaliauskaitė
- Andrius Zakarauskas
- Ligija Stalevičienė
