= Biržiška =

- Lithuanian surname
- m.: Biržiška
- f.: (unmarried): Biržiškaitė
- f.: (married): Biržiškienė

Biržiška is a Lithuanian surname, and may refer to:

- Mykolas Biržiška, Lithuanian historian of literature, politician, signer of the Act of Independence of Lithuania
- Vaclovas Biržiška (1884–1956), Lithuanian publisher and historian
- Viktoras Biržiška, Mathematician, educator, and encyclopedist
