= List of Estonian Americans =

This is a list of notable Estonian-Americans, including both original immigrants who obtained American citizenship and their American descendants.

To be included in this list, the person must have a Wikipedia article showing they are Estonian American or must have references showing they are Estonian American and are notable.

== Arts and literature ==
- Alar Kivilo (born 1953) — member of the Academy of Motion Picture Arts and Sciences, cinematographer
- Lisa Kivirist (born 1967) — author
- Kristjan Järvi (born 1972) — symphony conductor
- Neeme Järvi (born 1937) — symphony conductor. Moved to the US in 1981
- Paavo Järvi (born 1962) — current Music Director of the Cincinnati Symphony Orchestra
- Tõnu Kalam (born 1948) — pianist and symphony conductor
- Mark Kostabi (born 1960) — artist
- Paul Kostabi (born 1962) — artist, music producer
- Louis Kahn (1901–1974) — architect, designer of the Salk Institute, Kimbell Art Museum, and others
- Ilse Lehiste (1922–2010) — linguist and author
- Alexander Nelke (1894–1974) — artist
- Dennis Nurkse (born 1949) — poet
- Raymond Pettibon (born 1957) — artist, designer of the iconic Black Flag (band) bars
- Bill Rebane (born 1937) — film director
- Ene Riisna (born 1938) — television producer
- Jerry Saltz (Estonian father) (born 1951) — art critic
- Helen Tobias-Duesberg (1919–2010) — composer
- Priit Vesilind (born 1943) — author, photojournalist
- Kiino Villand (born 1969) — photographer
- Arthur Võõbus (1909–1988) — theologian, orientalist and church historian

== Science ==
- Nicole Aunapu Mann (born 1977) — astronaut and test pilot
- August Komendant (1906–1992) — Professor of Architecture at University of Pennsylvania (1959–74), Structural Engineer for Louis Kahn
- Pearn P. Niiler (1937–2010) — oceanographer
- Jaak Panksepp (1943–2017) — neuroscientist and psychobiologist
- Hillar Rootare (1928–2008) — physical chemist
- Rein Taagepera (born 1933) — Research Professor, Political science, University of California, Irvine; Professor Emeritus, University of Tartu, Estonia
- Riho Terras (1939–2005) — mathematician
- Alar Toomre (born 1937), Jüri Toomre — astronomers and mathematicians
- Karen Uhlenbeck (born 1942) — mathematician and founder of geometric analysis
- Lauri Vaska (1925–2015) — chemist

== Entertainment ==
- Erika Eleniak (born 1969) — Playboy Playmate and actress
- Greg Ginn (born 1954) — guitarist of Black Flag
- Miliza Korjus (1905–1980) — coloratura soprano opera singer
- Karolyn Nelke (born 1948) — stage actress
- Mena Suvari (born 1979) — actress (Estonian father)
- Ivan Triesault (1898–1980) — actor
- Johann Urb (born 1977) — actor and former model

== Sports ==
- Jaan Ehlvest (born 1962) — chess player
- Margus Hunt (born 1987) — football player
- Chris Jogis (born 1965) — badminton player
- David Laid (born 1998) — fitness influencer
- Ingrid Neel (born 1998) — tennis player
- Michael Roos (born 1982) — football player
- Sven Salumaa (born 1966) — tennis player
- Warren Cummings Smith (born 1991) — alpine skier
- Ralph Tamm (born 1966) — football player
- Katie Vesterstein (born 1999) — alpine skier

== Business ==
- Lachlan Murdoch (born 1971) — CEO of FOX Corporation
- Elisabeth Murdoch (born 1968) — businesswoman
- James Murdoch (born 1972) — businessman
- Steve Jurvetson (born 1967) — Draper Fisher Jurvetson businessman

== Politics ==
- Michael Josselson (1908–1978) — secretary general for the Congress for Cultural Freedom
- Jaan Laaman (born 1948) — leftist extremist
- Samuel H. Shapiro (1907–1987) — governor of Illinois.
- Edmund S. Valtman (1914–2005) — political cartoonist
- Melissa F. Wells (1932–2025) — diplomat

== Military ==
- Aleksander Einseln (1931–2017) — former Commander-in-chief of the Estonian army (dual U.S. and Estonian citizenship)
- Tiiu Kera (born 1945) — retired United States Air Force (USAF) major general
- Edward Masso — retired United States Navy Rear Admiral and ambassador to Estonia
