= Šiauliai Julius Janonis Gymnasium =

Julius Janonis Gymnasium
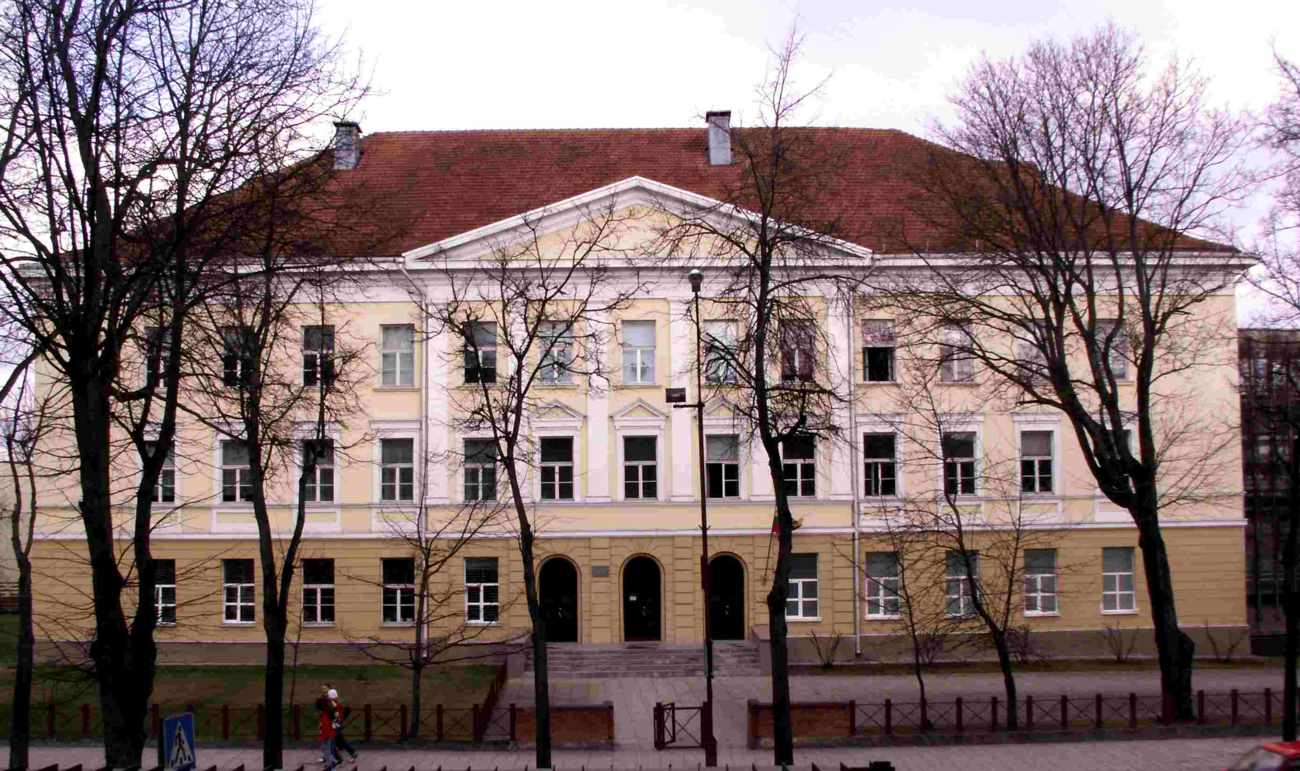
- Main school building

Location
- Šiauliai; Lithuania
- Coordinates: 55°55′50″N 23°18′46″E

Information
- Motto: Res non verba (Latin for deeds not words)
- Established: 30 August 1851; 173 years ago
- Grades: 9–12th
- Website: jjanonis.su.lt

Šiauliai Julius Janonis Gymnasium (Lithuanian: Šiaulių Juliaus Janonio gimnazija) is a public secondary school in Šiauliai, Lithuania. Established in 1851, it is one of the oldest schools in Lithuania and has educated many prominent figures in Lithuanian culture and politics (including four signatories of the Act of Independence of Lithuania). It was named in honor of Julius Janonis in 1946 and offers education for grades 9 through 12.

== History ==
The idea of a gymnasium in Šiauliai was raised in 1838 by local Lithuanian nobles and city's Jewish community. They argued that it was not enough for the Kovno Governorate to have only one gymnasium in Kaunas which was transferred from the Kražiai College. The nobles and the Jews promised to provide funds for the construction of the school and purchased a plot of land in 1839. The same year they opened a temporary five-year school. The construction started in 1845 and was completed in 1850 (some bricks were taken from a former monastery in Pašiaušė). Some teachers, books, furniture, and other inventory were transferred from the gymnasium in Svislach, Grodno Governorate, while the temporary school was transferred to Svislach.

The seven-year boys' school was opened on 30 August 1851. The first year it had 297 students, mostly children of local nobility and Russian officials. There were no restrictions based on student's age and thus the school had some students that were in their late 20s. The teachers were mostly Russian and the instruction was given in the Russian language. The school charged tuition (initially 10, increased to 40 rubles per year in 1859), but provided waivers for good grades or for less affluent students. After the abolition of serfdom in Russia, there were more students from families of farmers. The number of students increased to 570, but after the Uprising of 1863 it dropped to 180–202. In 1882, the number of students reached 524 but dropped once again due to new restrictions. In 1887, the number of Jewish students was capped at 10% of total. A separate gymnasium for girls was opened in 1898.

The school also had a library which started from about 2,000 books transferred form Svislach. It was the first government-funded library in Šiauliai. It grew slowly from 2,365 books in 1852 to 2,847 books (961 titles) in 1861. After the closure of the Šiauliai Public Library in 1864, its holdings grew to 5,731 books in 1866. In 1915, just before the school was shuttered due to World War I, the library had 11,327 books.

During World War I, the school building was transformed into a German military hospital and its buildings were severely damaged. The school returned to its historical premises in 1922. At that time it was a co-educational school with over 650 students, but the girls' gymnasium was spun out in 1928. In 1946, the school was named after poet Julius Janonis. The school building was reconstructed and expanded by adding the third floor in 1950. It became a co-educational school again in 1954. In 1970, the school established its museum which by 2010 held 3,448 exhibits. It regained its historical gymnasium status in 1996.

== Names ==
During its history, the school was known under these names:

- 1851: Šiauliai Men's Gymnasium (Šiaulių vyrų gimnazija)
- 1920: Šiauliai State Gymnasium (Šiaulių valstybinė gimnazija)
- 1928: Šiauliai Boys' State Gymnasium (Šiaulių valdžios berniukų gimnazija)
- 1946: Julius Janonis Secondary School (Juliaus Janonio vidurinė mokykla)
- 1996: Julius Janonis Gymnasium (Juliaus Janonio gimnazija)

== Notable alumni ==
The noted students and alumni included:

- 1870: Michał Węsławski, lawyer, mayor of Vilnius
- 1870: Petras Vileišis, engineer, publisher of Vilniaus žinios
- 1870: Gabrielius Landsbergis-Žemkalnis, dramatists
- 1891: Jonas Vileišis, attorney, signatory of the Act of Independence of Lithuania
- 1893: Alfonsas Petrulis, priest, signatory of the Act of Independence of Lithuania
- 1894: Povilas Višinskis, doctor, journalist
- 1898: Steponas Kairys, engineer, professor, signatory of the Act of Independence of Lithuania
- 1899: Konstantinas Šakenis, Minister of Education
- 1901: Mykolas Biržiška, professor, signatory of the Act of Independence of Lithuania
- 1903: Vaclovas Biržiška, bibliographer, professor
- 1904: Viktoras Biržiška, engineer, university professor
- 1905: Stasys Šalkauskis, philosopher
- 1915: Julius Janonis, poet
- 1923: Juozas Paukštelis, writer
- 1924: Juozas Grušas, writer, dramatists
- 1925: Vladas Niunka, communist official
- 1926: Stasys Ušinskas, stained glass artist
- 1928: Kostas Korsakas, poet, literary critic
- 1929: Jonas Noreika, Lithuanian partisan
- 1941: Jokūbas Minkevičius, philosopher
- 1941: Olegas Truchanas, traveler, photographer
- 1946: Saulius Sondeckis, conductor
- 1949: Vytautas Čekanauskas, architect
- 1949: Vytenis Rimkus, painter, art historian
- 1979: Šarūnas Birutis, Member of the European Parliament
- 1987: Ramūnas Karbauskis, politician
- 2007: Deimantė Daulytė, chess player
