= Union for the Liberation of Vilnius =

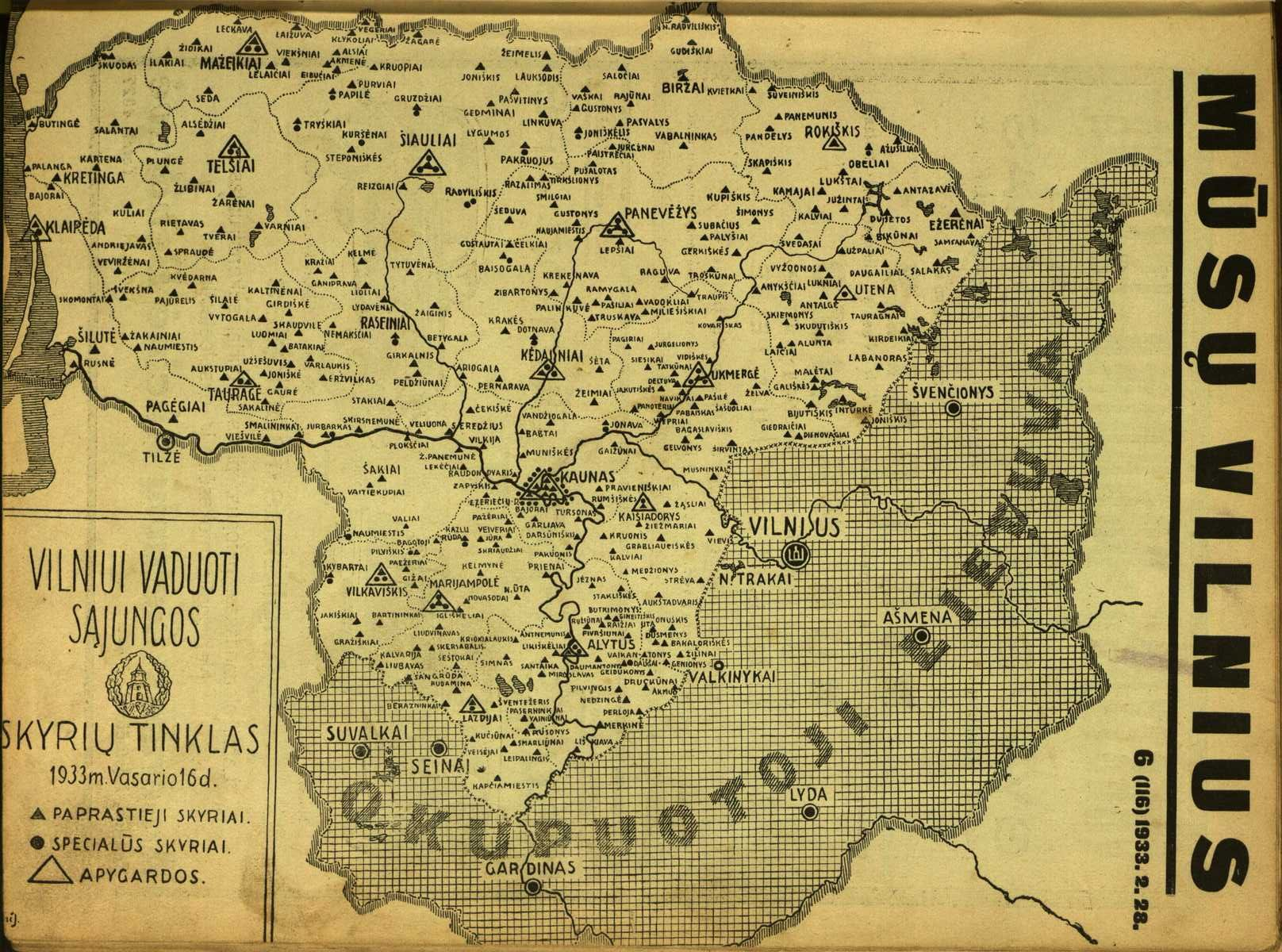
Cover of Mūsų Vilnius with a map of local chapters of the union as of February 1933 (Vilnius Region marked as "occupied Lithuania")

The Union for the Liberation of Vilnius (Lithuanian: Vilniaus vadavimo sąjunga or Vilniui vaduoti sąjunga) was an organization established in 1925 to support Lithuanian territorial claims to Vilnius Region then part of the Second Polish Republic. With 27,000 members and 600,000 supporters in 1937, it was one of the most popular organizations in interwar Lithuania. Its main goal was to mobilize the entire Lithuanian nation for cultural and educational work. It established an unofficial but highly popular national mourning day on 9 October (the anniversary of the Żeligowski's Mutiny of 1920). It organized numerous events, such as lectures and concerts, to promote the idea of Vilnius (Wilno, Vilna) as an integral part of the Lithuanian national identity – the historical capital of Lithuania that was unjustly occupied by Poland, though the city itself had a minuscule Lithuanian population. It also developed a coherent narrative of suffering brothers Lithuanians under the oppressive Polish regime, giving Lithuanians a common enemy. The union promoted emotional, almost cult-like, national attachment to Vilnius. The union was disestablished after the Polish ultimatum in March 1938.

== History ==
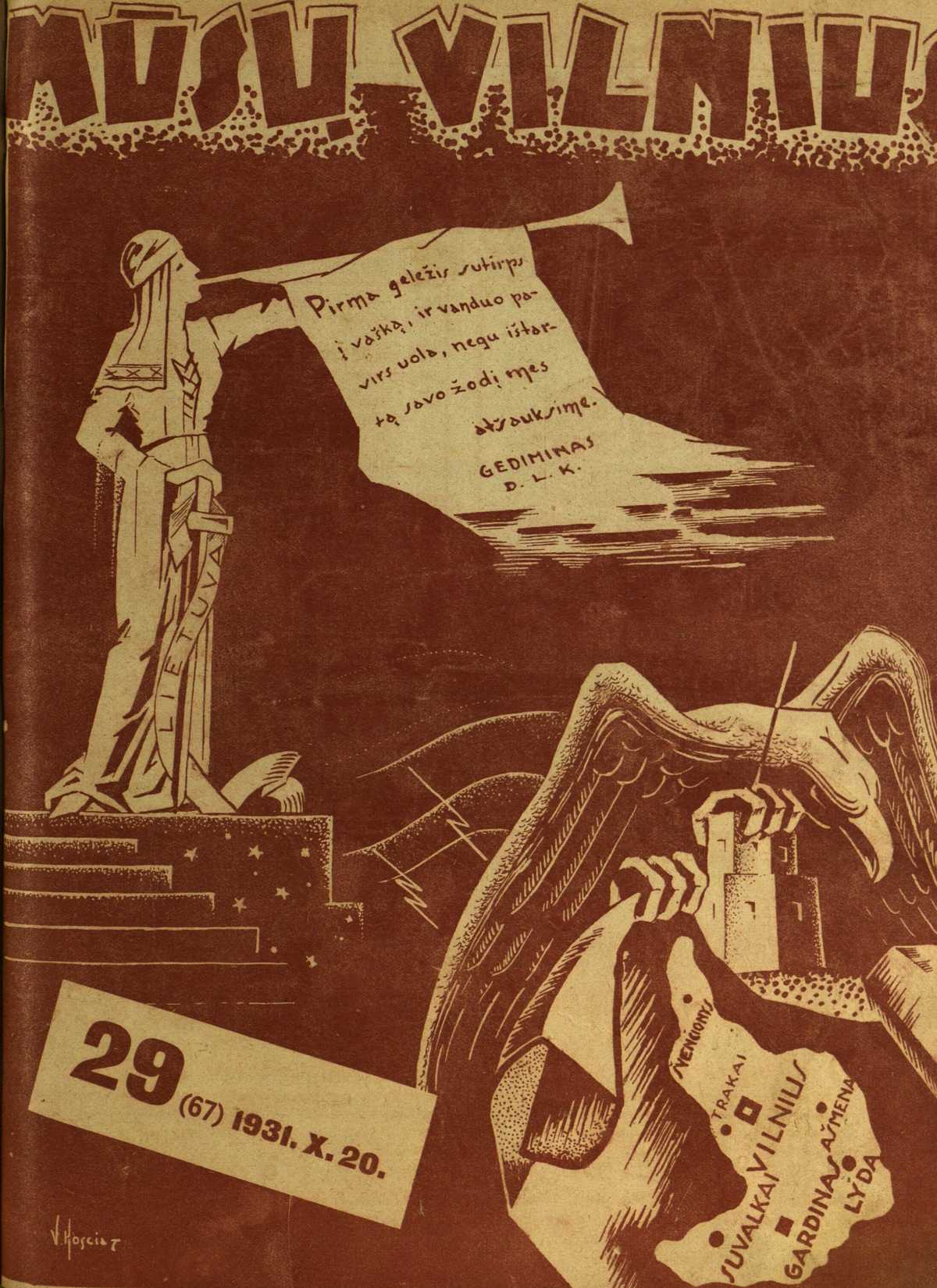
Cover of Mūsų Vilnius which depicts the Polish eagle stealing the Tower of Gediminas and map of Vilnius Region as well as a woman (Lithuania) blowing a trumpet with a quote from the Letters of Gediminas written in 1323

Vilnius (Vilna, Wilno) was captured by Polish forces during the Żeligowski's Mutiny in October 1920 and officially incorporated into Poland in March 1922. Lithuania protested these actions and refused to recognize the loss of Vilnius even de facto leading to the termination of any official relations with Poland. The union traced it roots to a committee established by 33 activists (20 Lithuanians and 13 Belarusians; including Viktoras Biržiška and Mykolas Biržiška) that Polish authorities exiled from Vilnius to Lithuania on 6 February 1922. The initial goal of the committee was to organize aid for the exiled Belarusian as they ended up in a foreign country with no financial means. In April 1922, it reorganized itself to a committee to support Lithuanians in Vilnius Region. The union was officially organized on 26 April 1925. Its establishment was prompted by the Concordat with Poland concluded in February 1925. The Holy See established an ecclesiastical province in Vilnius, thereby acknowledging Poland's claims to the city despite Lithuanian requests to govern the province directly from Rome. The founding meeting was attended by 62 people, including Mykolas Biržiška, Mečislovas Reinys, Antanas Smetona, Stasys Šilingas, Zigmas Žemaitis, Juozas Tumas-Vaižgantas, Donatas Malinauskas, Balys Sruoga, Antanas Žmuidzinavičius, Vladas Putvinskis. Biržiška was elected chairman and served until spring 1935 when he was replaced by Antanas Juška. Juška sympathized with the ruling Lithuanian Nationalist Union which supported the union and used it for political advantage. Government employees were required to participate in the union and purchase its publications and other commemorative items.

Lithuania accepted the Polish ultimatum in March 1938 and established diplomatic relations with Poland. Even though the government continued to claim Vilnius as the capital of Lithuania, the public interpreted the ultimatum as surrender of Vilnius. That year, 9 October was not marked as the mourning day. Polish representative to Lithuania Franciszek Charwat pressured the Lithuanian government to cease any references to "occupied Vilnius" and close the Union for the Liberation of Vilnius or at a minimum to reform it to an organization fostering cultural exchange between Poland and Lithuania. The union was officially closed on 25 November 1938. It was succeeded by the Homeland Union (Tėvynės sąjunga) which promoted patriotic education, fostered national culture, organized various cultural and educational events, and was active until the Soviet occupation of Lithuania in June 1940.

== Activities ==
=== Events and initiatives ===
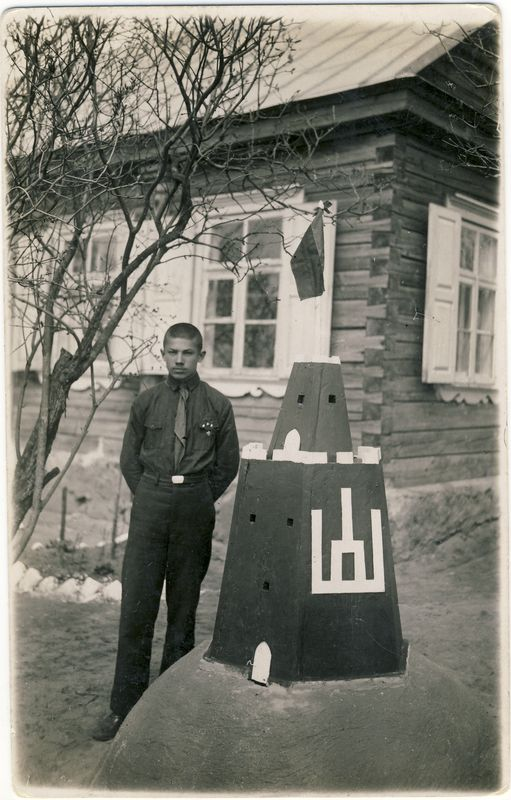
A model of the Gediminas' Tower in Anykščiai

The Union for the Liberation of Vilnius developed its activities in two major areas: domestic propaganda to build emotional attachment to Vilnius and providing help to Lithuanians in Vilnius Region. While there were other earlier attempts at promoting the idea of Vilnius, the union developed a constant and consistent propaganda effort. The organization focused on cultural propaganda and while it urged soldiers to be prepared to do their duty when the time comes, it did not support armed or violent activities (e.g. it did not encourage accumulation of weapons). The union was not a political organization, therefore it was able to cooperate with many different organizations, including the Lithuanian Riflemen's Union, Young Lithuania (youth organization of the Lithuanian Nationalist Union), Catholic youth organizations Ateitis and Pavasaris, Lithuanian Scouts.

Its first major event was to mark 9 October (the anniversary of the Żeligowski's Mutiny) as a national day of mourning. It became an annual observation during which traffic would stop and businesses would close. The union organized various events, including lectures, concerts, amateur theater performances, Catholic masses and prayers, tree plantings, radio programmes. In 1937, the union started erecting crosses dedicated to Vilnius (about 100 such crosses were built). The union also built models and replicas of the Gediminas' Tower. It adopted Ei, pasauli, mes be Vilniaus nenurimsim (Hey World, We Will Not Rest Without Vilnius), a poem by Petras Vaičiūnas, as its anthem and the song became so popular that it is sometimes referred to as the second national anthem of Lithuania. The issue of Vilnius was incorporated into school curriculum, not only in history or geography, but also in subjects such as religious education (i.e. explanation of the Gate of Dawn, Vilnius Cathedral, and other churches in Vilnius) or art (i.e. children were asked to draw symbols of Vilnius). The union had a special Vilnius Prayer approved by archbishop Juozapas Skvireckas in July 1926 and distributed in schools. The union built upon romantic medieval legends (e.g. Iron Wolf or Šventaragis' Valley) and painted a dire image of enslaved and repressed Lithuanians suffering under the Polish regime. The union and its propaganda efforts transformed Vilnius, a foreign and unfamiliar city to most Lithuanian peasants, into something familiar and cherished, an integral part of the national identity.

=== Publications, chapters, and sections ===
The union published 98 publications, including books, brochures, proclamations, posters, postcards. From 1928, the union published magazine Mūsų Vilnius (Our Vilnius). It was published monthly (1928–1929), every ten days (1931–1933), or twice a month (1930, 1934–1938). Its circulation grew from 8,000 copies in 1931 to 72,000 copies in 1937. Its editors were Vincas Uždavinys, Antanas Juška, Petras Babickas. The magazine had up to 40 pages and reported on the conditions of Lithuanians in Vilnius Region as well as other ethnic minorities, primarily Belarusians and Ukrainians, in Poland. The magazine also published poems, theater plays, announcements and reports on the union's activities, caricatures, historical essays, and articles on current political events. The magazine was richly illustrated with images of Vilnius (many by Jan Bułhak), daily lives of Lithuanians in Vilnius Region, views of Grodno, Wigry, Sejny, or Augustów.

The union organized local chapters in towns and villages across Lithuania. The number of chapters steadily grew from 6 in 1925 and 48 in 1927 to 141 in 1928. In early 1933, the union had 358 chapters, including 57 chapters attached to organizations. In 1937, it had 612 chapters in Lithuania and 60 chapters abroad (mostly United States but also in Scotland, France, Argentina, Brazil). Chapters in the United States were organized after chairman Biržiška toured various communities of Lithuanian Americans in spring 1931. The union established the Women's Section in 1932 (chaired by Jadvyga Tūbelienė, wife of the long-time prime minister Juozas Tūbelis) and the Jewish Section next year. In October 1931, the union established Vilnius Iron Fund (Vilniaus geležinis fondas) to raise money to support Lithuanian schools and societies active in the region. For example, in 1934, when farmers in Vilnius Region had a poor harvest, the union organized relief efforts and urged Lithuanians to donate one of their weekly meals to the starving Lithuanians in Vilnius. To raise money, supporters were issued Vilnius Passports to which they glued stamps purchased from the fund. Schoolchildren competed who could collect more stamps – an idea that Biržiška brought back from the United States. There were about 600,000 such passports issued. The first two passports were issued to the President and the Prime Minister. In January 1937, the union established Vilnius Institute. Its rector was Mykolas Biržiška and it was intended to study Vilnius Region, its history, language, customs, etc., but it was essentially inactive.
