= Vytautas Pikturna =

Lithuanian-American priest (1915–2002)

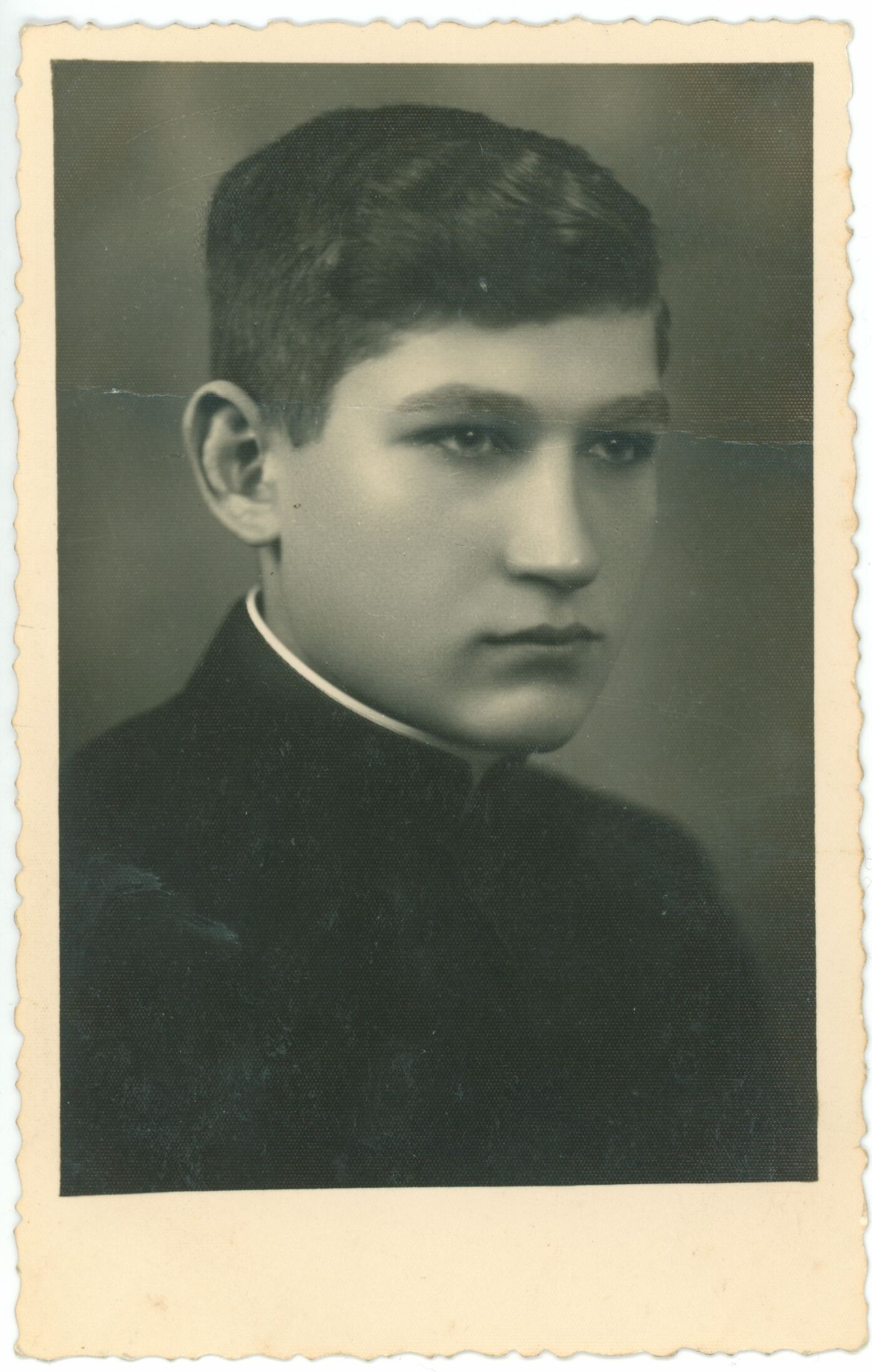
Pikturna in 1939

Vytautas Pikturna (February 26, 1915 – January 19, 2002) was a Lithuanian Catholic priest and survivor of the Dachau concentration camp. He was a distinguished figure in pastoral work in Lithuania, Germany, and the United States.

== Early life and education ==
Vytautas Pikturna was born in Kelmė, Lithuania, during World War I. His father, Jurgis Pikturna, was conscripted to fight on the side of the Imperial Russian Army during the war, while his mother, Emilija, worked as a seamstress.

Pikturna completed his primary and middle school education in Kelmė and later attended the Šiauliai Boys' Gymnasium (now Julius Janonis Gymnasium), where he demonstrated a talent for reciting poetry. Following his mother’s death in 1932, he worked as a tutor to support his younger siblings.

In 1934, Pikturna graduated from the gymnasium and entered the Kaunas Priest Seminary. On June 3, 1939, he was ordained and began working as a teacher of religion at the 4th Gymnasium in Kaunas, where he also served as chaplain. Simultaneously, he pursued advanced studies in theology and philosophy at Vytautas Magnus University.

== World War II and imprisonment ==
After the Soviet occupation of Lithuania in 1940, Pikturna lost his teaching position and sought refuge with Father Latvėnas at Kaunas Cathedral Basilica. During the German repatriation process, Pikturna obtained German origin documents and relocated to Germany, where he served Lithuanian expatriates.

On October 20, 1941, Pikturna was arrested by the Gestapo due to his opposition to Nazi policies. He was imprisoned in several German cities, including Wolfenbüttel, Braunschweig, Hannover, Kassel, Frankfurt, and Nuremberg, before being transferred to the Dachau concentration camp on February 20, 1942. Despite the harsh conditions, Pikturna survived and was liberated from Dachau by American forces on April 29, 1945.

"Dachau concentration camp, among other purposes, was designated for all priests arrested by the Gestapo. It is no surprise that more than 3,500 priests from 14 nationalities passed through this camp. Of these, approximately 2,000 were Polish priests. When the camp was liberated by American forces on April 29, 1945, only 1,182 priests were still alive, including 801 Poles. All others had perished in the camp, as only a handful had been released during that time—excluding 200 German priests who were freed by the Gestapo in the final weeks.

There were six Lithuanian priests in this camp: the eldest of all the camp's priests, Fr. Stanislovas Puida, an 83-year-old dean from Plock; Fr. Antanas Gedgaudas, the parish priest of Druskininkai; Fr. Jurgis Parancevičius, the parish priest of Vištytis; Evangelical pastor Jurgis Šeklys from Klaipėda; and pastor Zigfridas Loppe, a Lithuanian citizen from Vilnius.

It is worth noting that several other priests of various nationalities were held in other camps in Germany. For example, Fr. Stasys Yla and Fr. Alfonsas Lipniūnas were imprisoned in the Stutthof camp near Danzig."
— Father Vytautas Pikturna

== Post-War activities in Europe ==
Immediately after the war, Pikturna published his memories and reflections on the cruelty and hardships of life in the Dachau concentration camp in the Lithuanian newspaper Naujasis Gyvenimas (The New Life). These writings provided a firsthand account of the atrocities he endured, shedding light on the horrors of the camp.

Pikturna hoped to continue his studies in Italy, but occupation authorities denied him entry. Instead, he remained in Austria, where he studied at the University of Innsbruck, before relocating to Munich, Germany.

In Munich, Pikturna emerged as a key figure in the Lithuanian diaspora. He served as a chaplain for displaced persons camps, collaborated with the Lithuanian Red Cross, and provided spiritual and practical support to Lithuanians in hospitals and prisons. Between 1945 and 1949, he held leadership roles in the Lithuanian Priests' Association, serving as vice-chairman and chairman while editing its bulletin, Vox Temporis. Additionally, he was a spiritual guide for Lithuanian Catholic student organizations and chaired the board of the Lithuanian Anti-Nazi Resistance's Former Political Prisoners’ Union.

== Emigration to the United States ==
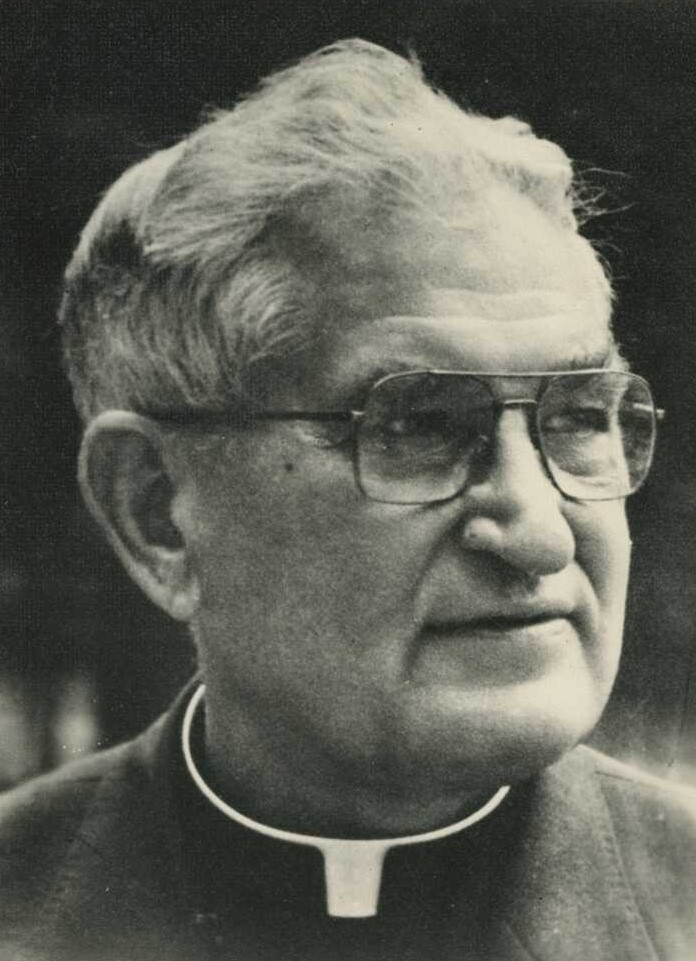
Pikturna, circa 1990

Pikturna emigrated to the United States on August 29, 1949, after being cleared of accusations of war crimes. Upon arrival, he served at Our Lady Queen of Angels Parish in Brooklyn, where he established a Lithuanian school and engaged in publishing activities. Pikturna contributed to Lithuanian-American publications and authored several works, including three collections of sermons Šviesa ir gyvenimas (Light and Life), and the book Amžinoji auka (The Eternal Sacrifice). He became a naturalized U.S. citizen in 1956.

== Later life and legacy ==
In 1989, Pikturna returned to Lithuania for the first time since the war to commemorate the 50th anniversary of his ordination at Kaunas Cathedral, the site where he had begun his priestly service.

Beginning in 1981, he served Lithuanian parishes in Florida, dedicating his efforts to the spiritual needs of the Lithuanian community. In 1998, due to declining health, he relocated to Putnam, Connecticut, where he spent his final years at the Sisters of the Immaculate Conception Infirmary.

Vytautas Pikturna died on January 19, 2002. He was laid to rest at the Gate of Heaven Cemetery in Putnam, Connecticut.
