= Jonas Puzinas =

Lithuanian archaeologist (1905–1978)

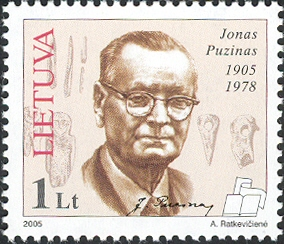
- Puzinas on a 2005 Lithuanian postage stamp
- Born: 1 October 1905; Svaronys, Kovno Governorate, Russian Empire
- Died: 14 April 1978 (aged 72); Chicago, United States
- Education: Vytautas Magnus University; University of Heidelberg
- Occupations: Archaeologist, university professor
- Awards: Order of Vytautas the Great

Jonas Puzinas (1 October 1905 – 14 April 1978) was a Lithuanian archaeologist and specialist on the prehistory of Lithuania. He belonged to the first generation of Lithuanian scholars who matured in independent Lithuania (1918–1940). He was the first scientifically trained archaeologist of Lithuania and he laid the foundations, including some of the basic terminology and periodization, for future archaeological studies. His work in Lithuania was cut short by World War II. In 1944, he retreated to Germany and then to the United States. There he continued his academic work, notably editing Lithuanian encyclopedias.

== Biography ==
=== Early life and education ===
Puzinas was born on 1 October [O.S. 18 September] 1905 in Svaronys near Deltuva to a family of well-to-do peasants. After graduating from Ukmergė Gymnasium, with the help of Steponas Kairys, he was accepted to the University of Lithuania. There he studied Lithuanian language and literature, comparative linguistics, and pedagogy in 1925–1929. Even as a gymnasium student, Puzinas showed interest in Lithuanian culture: he collected local Lithuanian songs and myths (sent to Jurgis Dovydaitis) and local vocabulary (sent to editors of the Academic Dictionary of Lithuanian). As a university student, Puzinas became a secretary of Antanas Smetona, President of Lithuania, and helped him edit and organize his correspondence and other paperwork. With Smetona's help, he received a scholarship of 20,000 litas from the Ministry of Education that enabled him to continue his studies in a Western university. He was the first to receive such scholarship; as a condition of the scholarship, he had to repay 10% of his post-graduation wages to the ministry.

At first, Puzinas considered University of Königsberg, but upon advice of professor Jurgis Gerulis, he chose University of Heidelberg where he studied prehistory, comparative linguistics, and classical archaeology in 1930–1934. Puzinas studied under Ernst Wahle, who had excavated in Latvia and was familiar with Baltic archaeology. Wahle was Puzinas' doctoral advisor, mentor, and even friend; his influence is noticeable in many of Puzinas' works. In 1935, Puzinas successfully defended his Ph.D. thesis on prehistoric research and the Lithuanian National Revival. The work detailed the history of archaeological studies in Lithuania up to 1918 and their effect on the Lithuanian identity. It was more a work of history than archaeology. The thesis was published in Kaunas in 1935 in its original German language (Vorgeschichtsforschung und Nationalbewusstsein in Litauen). The thesis shows minor influence of the budding school of thought that material remains can be equated to ethnicity (Kossinna's law) that formed the basis for Nazi archaeology. Echoes of this theory can be found in Puzinas' later works as well.

=== Career in Lithuania ===
After studies in Germany, Puzinas returned to Kaunas. He became director of Kaunas City Museum, where he briefly worked as a student. He inherited a museum that more closely resembled a storage space of old artifacts than a modern museum. He also became an assistant professor at the Faculty of Humanities of Vytautas Magnus University. Among his students were Marija Gimbutas, Pranas Kulikauskas, Rimutė Jablonskytė-Rimantienė. He was one of the few professors at the faculty who received proper education in their field of study. He lectured on 20 topics, including broad topics, such as Indo-Europeans, vikings, prehistory of Europe. Lectures were often accompanied by field trips to museum or historical sites, even experiments (for example, recreating control of fire by early humans).

When Vytautas the Great War Museum was opened in 1936, Puzinas developed its prehistory exhibition based on the modern museum practices. The exhibition was officially opened in January 1938 by president Antanas Smetona. For this accomplishment, Puzinas was awarded the Order of Vytautas the Great. He participated in 27 archaeological excavations, mostly burials, but showed no great enthusiasm for field work, often supervising the excavations only on paper. He organized obtained data and exhibits, visited museums abroad, attended international archaeological conventions, published articles on prehistory and archaeology in Lithuanian press and Lietuviškoji enciklopedija, the first encyclopaedia in Lithuanian. He also made presentations to schoolchildren to popularize the field. Between 1935 and 1944 he published about 150 articles and other publications.

In 1939, he became privatdozent for his seminal work and habilitation thesis Naujausių proistorinių tyrinėjimų duomenys (Findings of the Most Recent Archaeological Explorations). This work became a textbook on prehistory of Lithuania. It was superseded only by Lietuvos archeologijos bruožai published in 1961. Puzinas aggregated, summarized, and interpreted data from different excavations in 1928–1938 and created a chronological outline of the prehistory of Lithuania. His periodization of the three ages in Lithuania is still used by modern scholars. The work featured a large number of new scientific terms in Lithuanian language that Puzinas created in collaboration with linguist Antanas Salys. To that end Puzinas created a card index file with archaeological terms in various languages (Lithuanian, Polish, German, Russian). The file, about 9,000 or 10,000 cards in total, is preserved by Martynas Mažvydas National Library of Lithuania. Possibly, it was an embryo of a multilingual archaeological dictionary. Among the basic terms introduced by Puzinas are radinys (find) and žalvario amžius (Bronze Age).

After Soviet Union transferred Vilnius to Lithuania in 1939, Puzinas was moved there and was appointed dean of the Faculty of Humanities at Vilnius University. He managed to establish a separate the Department of Archaeology, which he chaired. In 1941, Puzinas joined the Lithuanian Academy of Sciences.

=== In Germany and United States ===
In July 1944, fearing the second Soviet occupation, Puzinas retreated to Germany where he taught at the Baltic University in Pinneberg near Hamburg in West Germany. He was the university rector from April 1948 to September 1949. While in Germany, Puzinas published five articles on archaeological topics based on data he brought from Lithuania. A German-language article on fibula, dedicated to Puzinas' former mentor Ernst Wahle, was well received and cited by German and Polish archaeologists.

In 1949, as a displaced person, Puzinas moved to Philadelphia, United States. He worked various jobs, but also joined activities of Lithuanian diaspora. In 1953–1969, he contributed to and edited the 35-volume Lietuvių enciklopedija and later the six-volume Encyclopedia Lituanica. Even without the ability to conduct excavations, Puzinas wrote archaeological studies, mostly on regional (Švėkšna, Panevėžys/Upytė, Suvalkija) and urban issues (Vilnius Castle Complex, Old Hrodna Castle). He also wrote reviews of works published, often by his former students, in Soviet Lithuania. He started writing a broad work on prehistory of Lithuania, but managed to finish only a few sections.

== Death and legacy ==
In 1974, Puzinas moved to the Chicago Lawn neighborhood of Chicago, where he died in 1978. Two volumes of his selected works (1,613 pages in total) were published in 1983 in Chicago. Back in Lithuania, Puzinas' published works were marginalized and his name censored as his biography did not fit Soviet needs. However, his students continued his work.

His contributions were recognized after Lithuania regained independence in 1990. A memorial stone was installed near his birth home in Svaronys in 1994; Lietuvos paštas issued a stamp on his 100th birth anniversary. Since 1996, Vilnius University organizes international conferences on archaeological topics named after Puzinas.
