= Estonians =

Finnic ethnic group

Estonians eestlased
- Countries with significant Estonian population and descendants.

Total population
- c. 1.1 million

Regions with significant populations
- Estonia 925,892 (2023) Other significant population centers
- Finland: 49,590–100,000 (Note: Statistics Finland does not record ethnicity and instead categorizes the population by their native language; in 2017, Estonian was spoken as a mother tongue by 49,590 people, not all of whom may be ethnic Estonians.)
- United States: 29,128
- Sweden: 25,509
- Canada: 24,000
- United Kingdom: 10,000–15,000
- Russia: 7,778
- Australia: 7,543
- Germany: 6,286
- Norway: 5,092
- Ukraine: 2,868
- Ireland: 2,560
- Belgium: 2,000
- Denmark: 1,691
- Latvia: 1,676
- Italy: 1,589
- Netherlands: 1,482

Languages
- Primarily Estonian also Võro and Seto

Religion
- Majority irreligious Historically Protestant Christian (Lutheranism); Currently Lutheran and regional Eastern Orthodox (Estonian Apostolic Orthodox) minority

Related ethnic groups
- Other Finnic peoples

Estonians or Estonian people (Estonian: eestlased) are a Finnic ethnic group native to the Baltic Sea region in Northern Europe, primarily Estonia.

Estonians primarily speak the Estonian language, a language related to other Finnic languages, e.g. Finnish, Karelian and Livonian. Estonians can also be classified into subgroups according to dialects (e.g. Võros, Setos - although the dialects of South Estonian are also often considered separate languages), although such divisions have become less pronounced due to internal migration and extensive urbanisation in Estonia in the 20th century. However, the Võros and Setos are increasingly recognized as distinct ethnic groups, they are not officially recognized as such by the government of Estonia.

There are approximately 1.1 million ethnic Estonians worldwide, with the majority of them residing in their native Estonia. Estonian diaspora communities formed primarily in Finland, the United States, Sweden, Canada, and the United Kingdom.

== History ==
According to archaeological research the area of Estonia was first inhabited about 13,000–11,000 years ago. It has previously been claimed living in the same area for more than 5,000 years would put Estonians' ancestors among Europe's oldest permanent inhabitants. On the other hand, some recent linguistic estimations suggest that Finno-Ugric speakers arrived around the Baltic Sea considerably later, perhaps during the Early Bronze Age (ca. 1800 BCE). It has also been argued that Western Uralic tribes reached Fennoscandia first, leading into the development of the Sámi peoples, and arrived in the Baltic region later in the Bronze Age or the transition to the Iron Age at the latest. This lead into the formation of Baltic Finnic peoples, who would later become such groups as Estonians and Finns.

The oldest known endonym of the Estonians is maarahvas, literally meaning "land people" or "country folk". It was used until the mid-19th century, when it was gradually replaced by Eesti rahvas "Estonian people" during the Estonian national awakening. Eesti, the modern endonym of Estonia, is thought to have similar origins to Aesti, the name used by the Germanic peoples for the neighbouring people living northeast of the mouth of the Vistula. The Roman historian Tacitus in 98 CE was the first to mention the "Aesti" in writing. In Old Norse, the land south of the Gulf of Finland was called Eistland and the people eistr. The Wanradt–Koell Catechism, the oldest known book in Estonian, was printed in 1535, while the oldest known examples of handwritten Estonian appear in 13th-century chronicles.

=== National identity ===
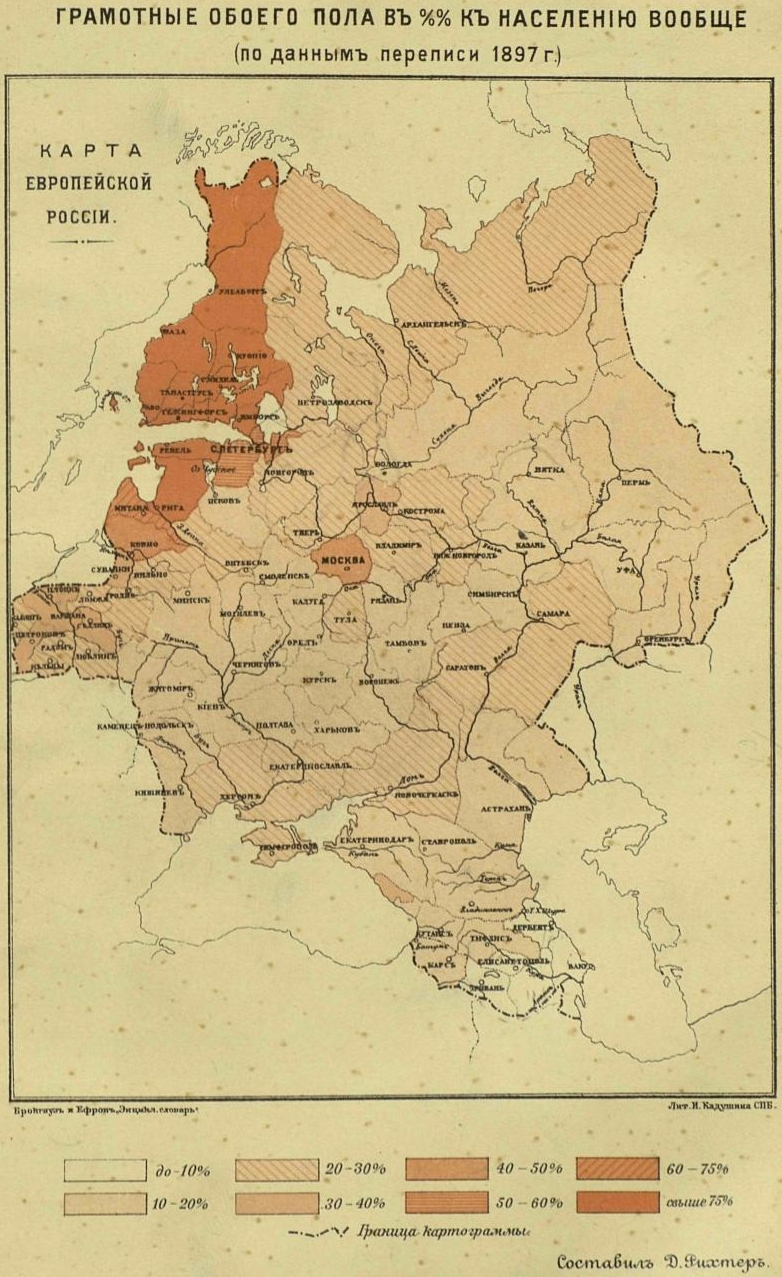
Public education systems founded during prior Swedish rule turned Estonia and Finland into the two most literate areas of Russian Empire (map of 1897 census literacy data)

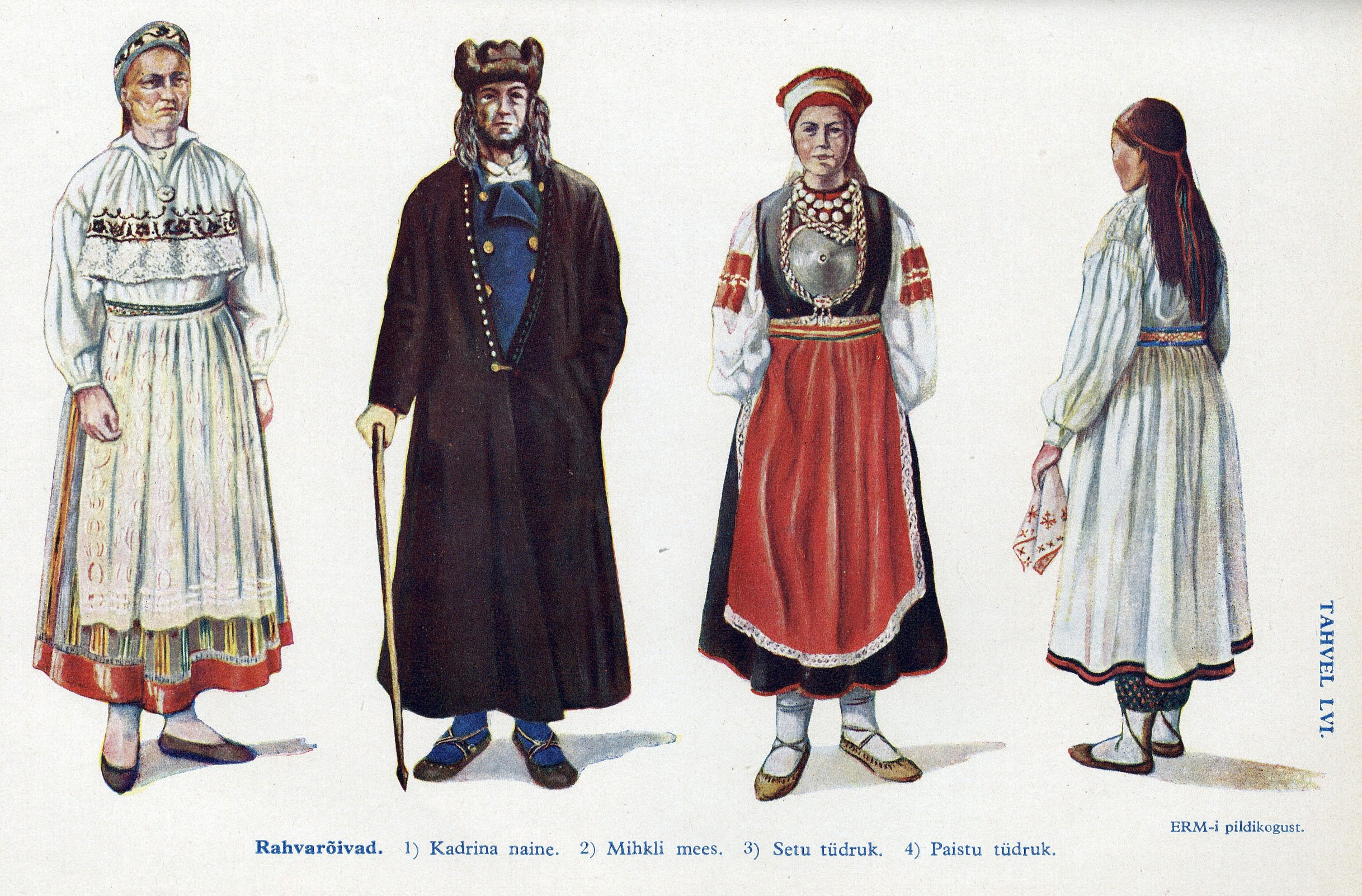
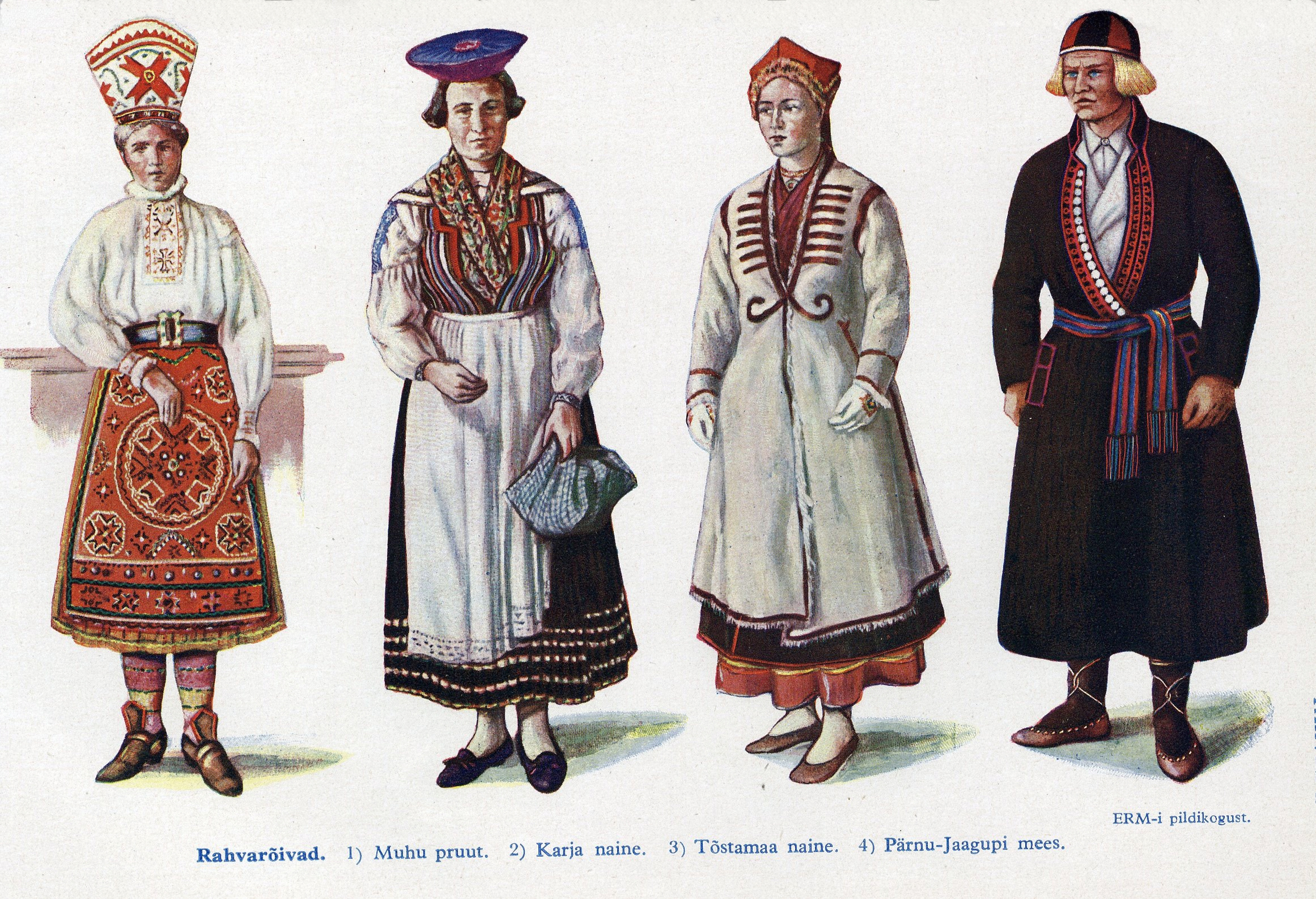
Selection of 19th century Estonian festive folk costumes (by region, from top, left to right: Kadrina, Mihkli, Seto, Paistu, Muhu, Karja, Tõstamaa, Pärnu-Jaagupi)

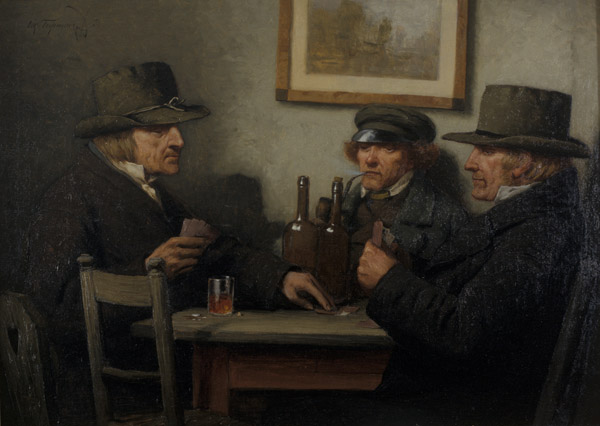
Estonian farmers playing cards (by Oskar Hoffmann, ca 1895)

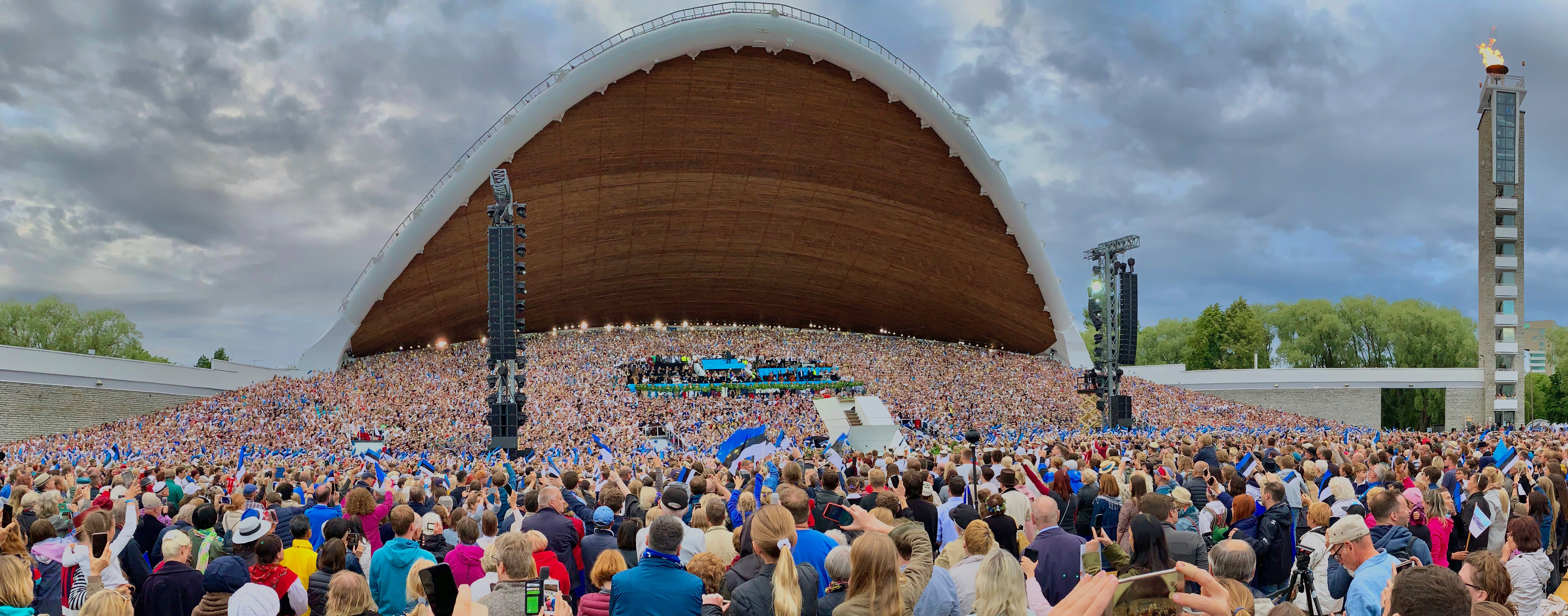
View of the 2019 Estonian Song Festival stage. Held since 1869, the festival is now one of the largest choral events in the world, and a major symbol of Estonian national identity

Although Estonian national identity spread in the course of the 19th century during the Estonian national awakening, some degree of ethnic awareness preceded this development. By the 18th century the self-denomination eestlane spread among Estonians along with the older maarahvas. Bible translations into Estonian appeared in 1739, the number of books and brochures published in Estonian increased from 18 in the 1750s to 54 in the 1790s, and, by 1800, more than a half of adult Estonians could read. The first university-educated intellectuals identifying themselves as Estonians, including Friedrich Robert Faehlmann (1798–1850), Kristjan Jaak Peterson (1801–1822) and Friedrich Reinhold Kreutzwald (1803–1882), appeared in the 1820s. The ruling elites had remained predominantly German in language and culture since the conquest of the early 13th century. Garlieb Merkel (1769–1850), a Baltic-German Estophile, became the first author to treat the Estonians as a nationality equal to others; he became a source of inspiration for the Estonian national movement, modelled on the Baltic German cultural world before the middle of the 19th century. However, in the middle of the century, Estonians became more ambitious and started leaning toward the Finns and their nationalist movement as successful model for their own national movement. By the end of 1860s, the Estonians became unwilling to reconcile with German cultural and political hegemony. Before the attempts at Russification in the 1880s, their view of the Russian Empire remained positive.

Estonians have strong ties to the Nordic countries stemming from important cultural and religious influences over centuries during Scandinavian and German rule and settlement. According to a poll done in 2013, about half of the young Estonians considered themselves Nordic, and about the same number viewed Baltic identity as important. Estonians consider themselves part of the Finno-Ugric peoples, which does not exclude being Baltic. In Estonian foreign ministry reports from the early 2000s, a Nordic identity was preferred over a Baltic one.

It is estimated that a bit under 200,000 Estonians lived in Russia at the time of Estonia's independence. After the Treaty of Tartu (1920) recognised Estonia's independence from Russia, ethnic Estonians residing in Russia gained the option to acquire Estonian citizenship upon returning to the newly independent country. 37,578 people resettled from Russia to Estonia in 1920–1923.

== Regions ==
Historically and culturally, Estonia is mostly divided into Northern and Southern Estonia. The South Estonian language is mostly considered a separate language.

The inhabitants of Southern Estonia, especially those from Võrumaa, have been considered more open and welcoming in nature; there are also other differences.

== Emigration ==
During World War II, when Estonia was occupied by the Soviet Army in 1944, large numbers of Estonians fled their homeland on ships or smaller boats over the Baltic Sea. Many refugees who survived the risky sea voyage to Sweden or Germany later moved from there to Canada, the United Kingdom, the United States or Australia. Some of these refugees and their descendants returned to Estonia after the nation regained its independence in 1991.

Over the years of independence, many Estonians have chosen to work abroad, primarily in Finland, but also in the UK, Benelux, Sweden, and Germany.

=== Estonians in Canada ===
One of the largest permanent Estonian communities outside Estonia is in Canada, with about 24,000 people (according to some sources up to 50,000 people). In the late 1940s and early 1950s, about 17,000 arrived in Canada, initially in Montreal. Toronto is currently the city with the largest population of Estonians outside of Estonia. The first Estonian World Festival was held in Toronto in 1972.

== Genetics ==
=== Uniparental haplogroups ===
Y-chromosome haplogroups among Estonians include N1c (35.7%), R1a (33.5%) and I1 (15%). R1a, common in Eastern Europe, was the dominant Y-DNA haplogroup among the pre-Uralic inhabitants of Estonia, as it is the only one found in the local samples from the time of the Corded Ware culture and Bronze Age. Estonians carry it at a similar frequency as some other Baltic-Finnic groups, and Latvians and Lithuanians. Pointing to founder effects which decoupled it from whole-genome ancestry in the east Baltic, as well as assimilation of Finnic speakers by the linguistic ancestors of the latter two. Appearance of N1c is linked to the arrival of Uralic-speakers. It originated in East Eurasia and is commonly carried by modern Uralic-speaking groups but also other North Eurasians, including Estonians' Baltic-speaking neighbors Latvians and Lithuanians, who have it in roughly the same proportion as Estonians. Compared to the Balts, Estonians have been noticed to have differences in allelic variances of N1c haplotypes, showing more similarity with other Finno-Ugric-speakers. This may mean that the haplogroup entered the area in more than one Finno-Ugric-related migration wave.

When looking at maternal lineages, nearly half (45%) of the Estonians have the haplogroup H. About one in four (24.2%) carry the haplogroup U, and the majority of them belong to its subclade U5.

=== Autosomal DNA ===
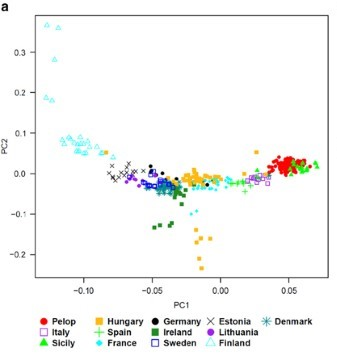
A PCA of Estonians and several other European populations.

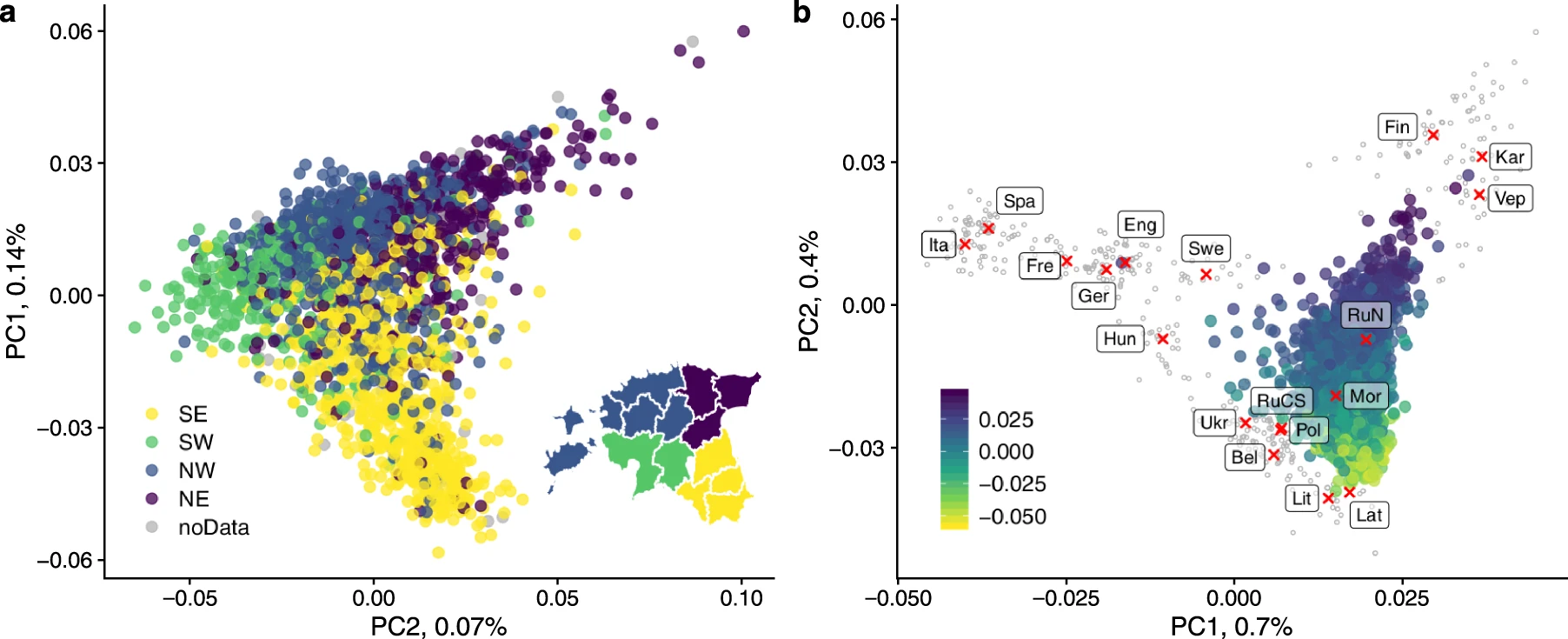
Regional population structure of Estonians.

Autosomally Estonians are close with Latvians and Lithuanians. However, they are shifted towards the Finns, who are isolated from most European populations. Northeastern Estonians are the closest to the Finns, while southeastern Estonians are closer to the Latvians and Lithuanians; other Estonians plot between these two extremes. Out of the Finns, the southwestern ones are both genetically and linguistically closest to Estonians.

Estonians have one of the highest shares of hunter-gatherer-related admixture among Europeans. Estonians also have high steppe-like admixture, and are less farmer-related than Western and Central Europeans. The same pattern is found also in the Latvians and Lithuanians, Finns and Mordvins, for example. Uralic peoples typically carry a Siberian-related component, which is also present in Estonians and makes up about five percent of their ancestry on average. Although they have a smaller share of it than other Finnic-speakers, it is one factor that distinguishes them from the Balts. Estonians can also be modelled to have more Finnish-like ancestry than Baltic-speaking Latvians and Lithuanians.

Estonians have a high sharing of IBD (identity-by-descent) segments with other studied Finnic groups (Finns, Karelians and Vepsians) and the Sami people, as well as with the Polish people.

== See also ==
- Demographics of Estonia
- Estonian Americans
- Estonian Argentines
- Estonian Australians
- Estonian Canadians
- Estonian national awakening
- Gauja Estonians
- List of Estonian Americans
- List of notable Estonians
