= Vaska's complex =

- Vaska's complex

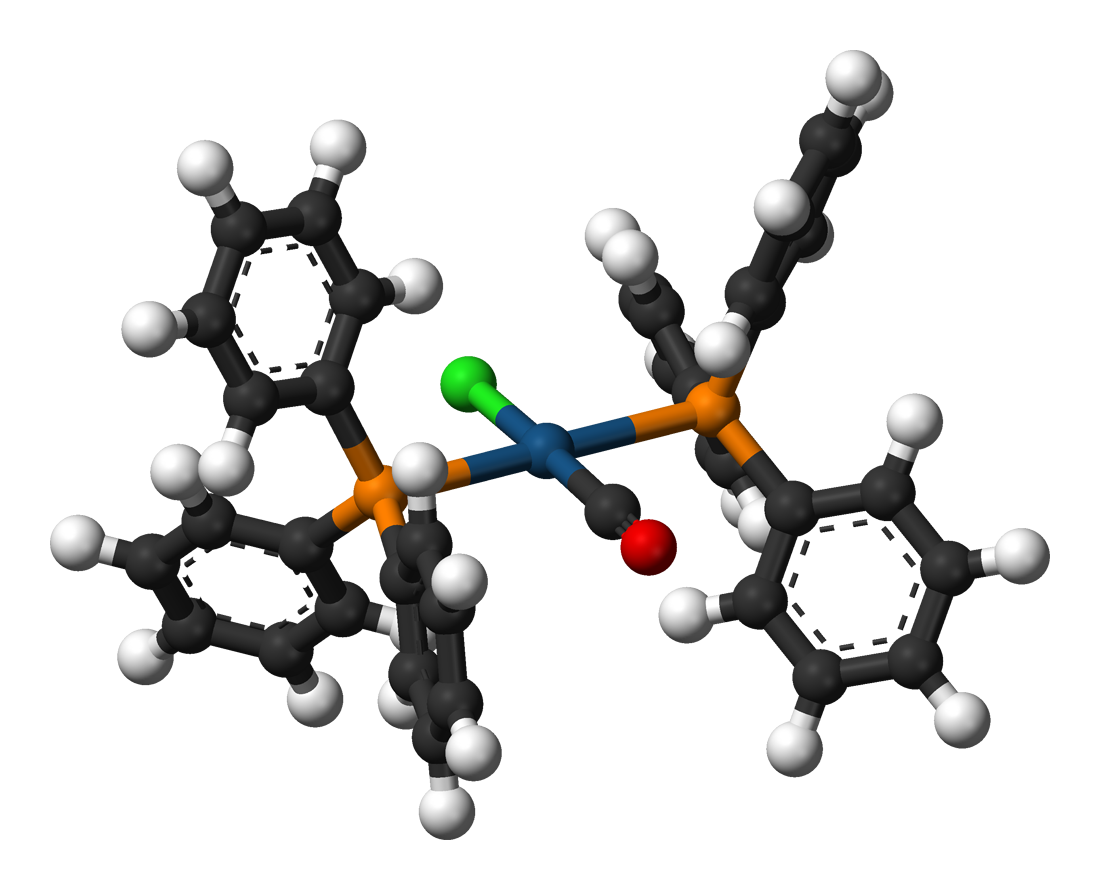
- Vaska's complex

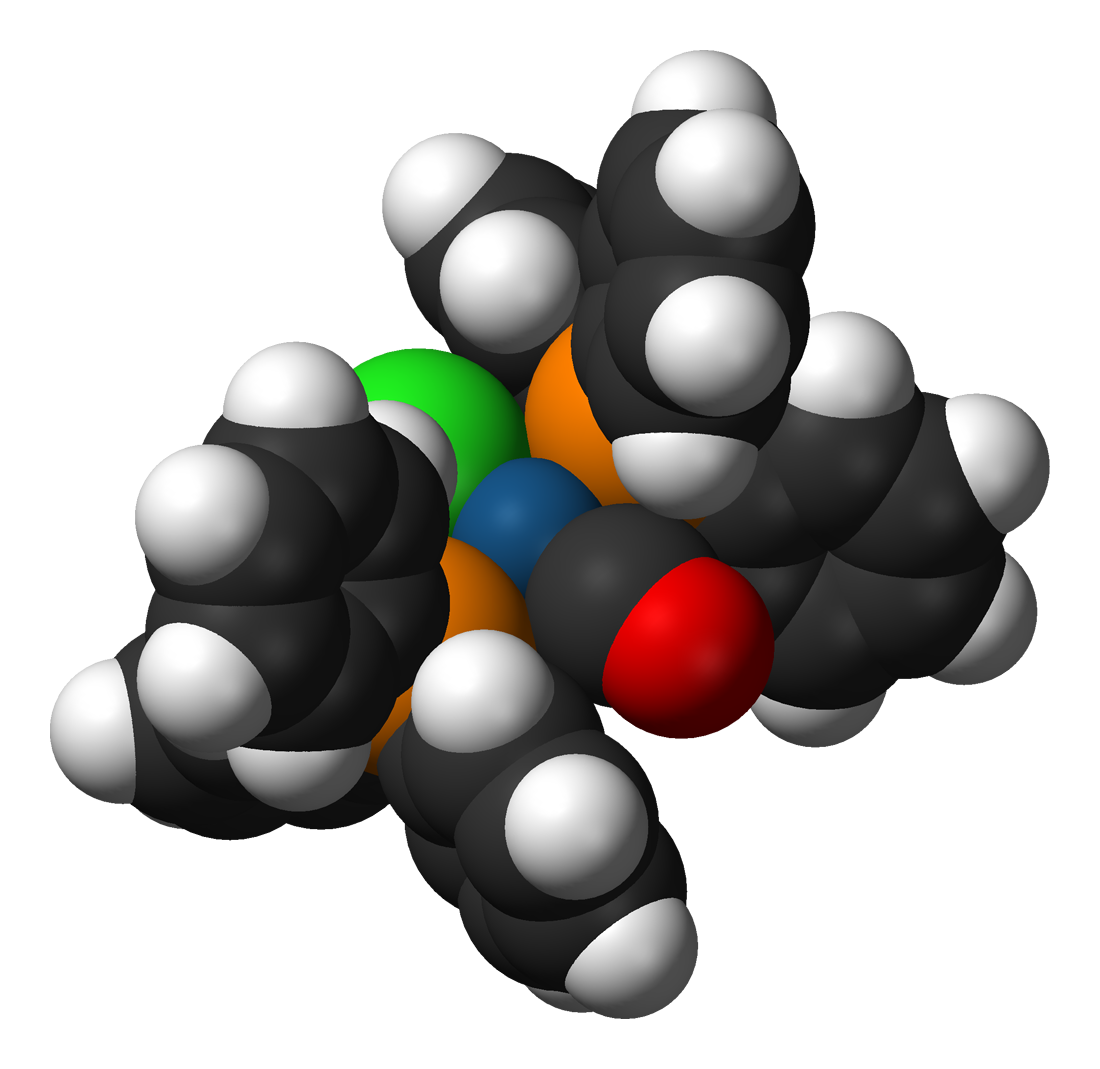
- Vaska's complex

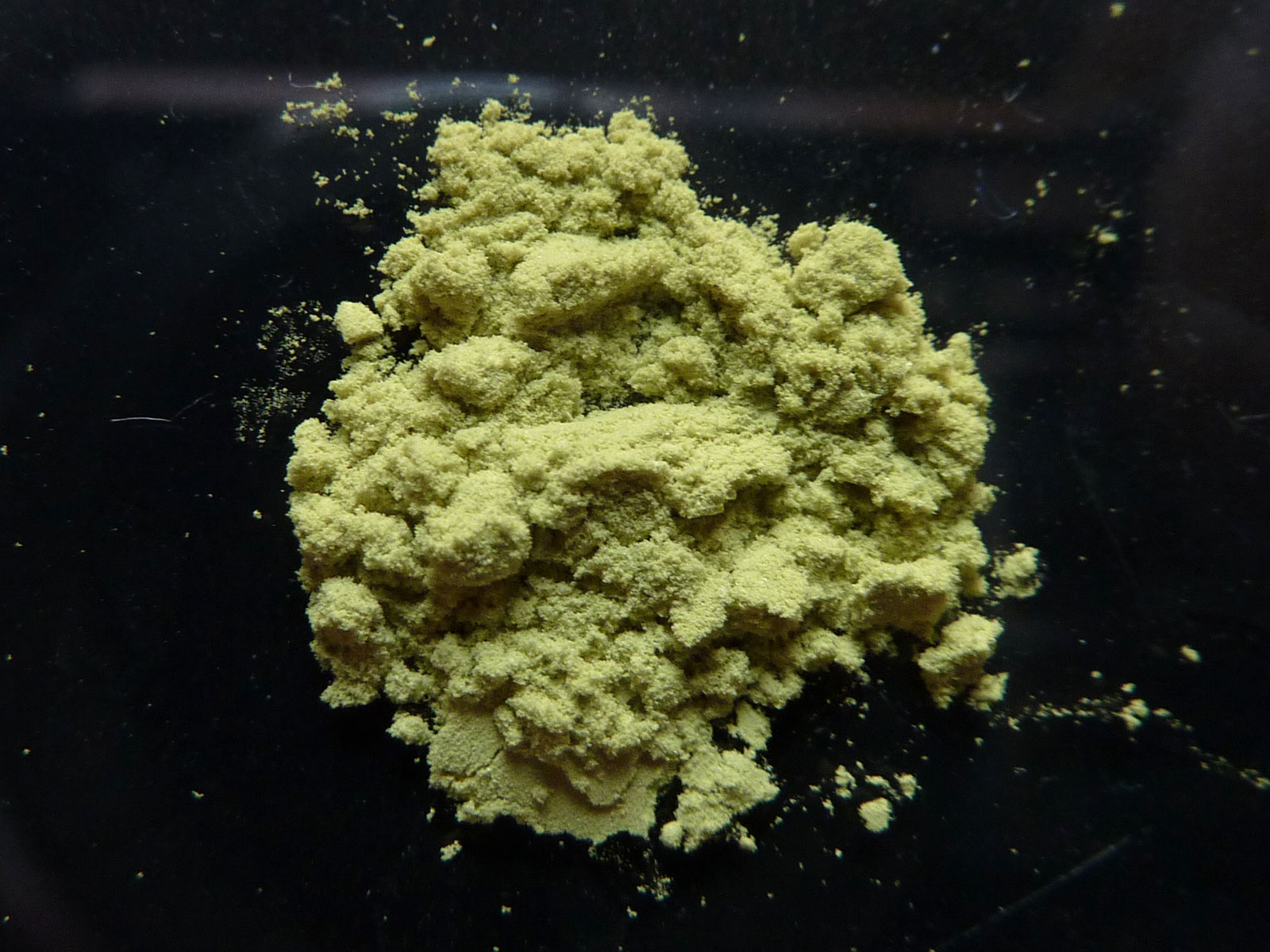
- Vaska's complex sample

Names
- IUPAC name (SP-4-1)-carbonylchloridobis(triphenylphosphane)iridium(I)
- Other names Iridium(I)bis(triphenylphosphine) carbonyl chloride Vaska's complex Vaska's compound

Identifiers
CAS Number	14871-41-1
3D model (JSmol)	Interactive image
ChemSpider	21106488
ECHA InfoCard	100.035.386
EC Number	238-941-6
PubChem CID	73553235 (incorrect formula)
UNII	J8AO572UZW
- InChI: InChI=1S/2C18H15P.CO.ClH.Ir/c2*1-4-10-16(11-5-1)19(17-12-6-2-7-13-17)18-14-8-3-9-15-18;1-2;;/h2*1-15H;;1H;/q;;;;-1/p+1 Key: ZOMWXKQUBRXYLE-UHFFFAOYSA-O; InChI=1/2C18H15P.CO.ClH.Ir/c2*1-4-10-16(11-5-1)19(17-12-6-2-7-13-17)18-14-8-3-9-15-18;1-2;;/h2*1-15H;;1H;/q;;;;-1/p+1/rC37H32ClIrOP2/c38-39(31-40,41(32-19-7-1-8-20-32,33-21-9-2-10-22-33)34-23-11-3-12-24-34)42(35-25-13-4-14-26-35,36-27-15-5-16-28-36)37-29-17-6-18-30-37/h1-30,41-42H Key: ZOMWXKQUBRXYLE-JPKJWYTPAA
- SMILES: c1ccc(cc1)[P+](c2ccccc2)(c3ccccc3)[Ir-2](=C=O)([P+](c4ccccc4)(c5ccccc5)c6ccccc6)Cl

Properties
Chemical formula	IrCl(CO)[P(C_{6}H_{5})_{3}]_{2}.
Molar mass	780.25 g/mol
Appearance	yellow crystals
Melting point	215 °C (419 °F; 488 K) (decomposes)
Boiling point	360 °C (680 °F; 633 K)
Solubility in water	insol

Structure
Coordination geometry	sq. planar

Hazards
- Occupational safety and health (OHS/OSH)
Main hazards	none
- GHS labelling
Pictograms	(GHS06: Toxic) (GHS07: Exclamation mark)
Signal word	Danger
Hazard statements	H301, H302, H311, H312, H315, H319, H331, H332, H335
Precautionary statements	P261, P264, P270, P271, P280, P301+P310, P301+P312, P302+P352, P304+P312, P304+P340, P305+P351+P338, P311, P312, P321, P322, P330, P332+P313, P337+P313, P361, P362, P363, P403+P233, P405, P501

Related compounds
Other anions	IrI(CO)[P(C_{6}H_{5})_{3}]_{2}
Other cations	RhCl(CO)[P(C_{6}H_{5})_{3}]_{2}
Related compounds	Pd[P(C_{6}H_{5})_{3}]_{4}
- Except where otherwise noted, data are given for materials in their standard state (at 25 °C [77 °F], 100 kPa). verify (what is ?) Infobox references

Vaska's complex is the trivial name for the chemical compound trans-carbonylchlorobis(triphenylphosphine)iridium(I), which has the formula IrCl(CO)[P(C_{6}H_{5})_{3}]_{2}. This square planar diamagnetic organometallic complex consists of a central iridium atom bound to two mutually trans triphenylphosphine ligands, carbon monoxide and a chloride ion. The complex was first reported by J. W. DiLuzio and Lauri Vaska in 1961. Vaska's complex can undergo oxidative addition and is notable for its ability to bind to O_{2} reversibly. It is a bright yellow crystalline solid.

== Preparation ==
The synthesis involves heating virtually any iridium chloride salt with triphenylphosphine and a carbon monoxide source. The most popular method uses dimethylformamide (DMF) as a solvent, and sometimes aniline is added to accelerate the reaction. Another popular solvent is 2-methoxyethanol. The reaction is typically conducted under nitrogen. In the synthesis, triphenylphosphine serves as both a ligand and a reductant, and the carbonyl ligand is derived by decomposition of dimethylformamide, probably via a deinsertion of an intermediate Ir-C(O)H species. The following is a possible balanced equation for this complicated reaction.

IrCl_{3}(H_{2}O)_{3} + 3 P(C_{6}H_{5})_{3} + HCON(CH_{3})_{2} + C_{6}H_{5}NH_{2} → IrCl(CO)[P(C_{6}H_{5})_{3}]_{2} + [(CH_{3})_{2}NH_{2}]Cl + OP(C_{6}H_{5})_{3} + [C_{6}H_{5}NH_{3}]Cl + 2 H_{2}O

Typical sources of iridium used in this preparation are IrCl_{3}·xH_{2}O and H_{2}IrCl_{6}.

== Reactions ==
Studies on Vaska's complex helped provide the conceptual framework for homogeneous catalysis. Vaska's complex, with 16 valence electrons, is considered "coordinatively unsaturated" and can thus bind to one two-electron or two one-electron ligands to become electronically saturated with 18 valence electrons. The addition of two one-electron ligands is called oxidative addition. Upon oxidative addition, the oxidation state of the iridium increases from Ir(I) to Ir(III). The four-coordinated square planar arrangement in the starting complex converts to an octahedral, six-coordinate product. Vaska's complex undergoes oxidative addition with conventional oxidants such as halogens, strong acids such as HCl, and other molecules known to react as electrophiles, such as iodomethane (CH_{3}I).

Vaska's complex binds O_{2} reversibly:

IrCl(CO)[P(C_{6}H_{5})_{3}]_{2} + O_{2} ⇌ IrCl(CO)[P(C_{6}H_{5})_{3}]_{2}O_{2}

The dioxygen ligand is bonded to Ir by both oxygen atoms, called side-on bonding. In myoglobin and hemoglobin, by contrast, O_{2} binds end-on, attaching to the metal via only one of the two oxygen atoms. The resulting dioxygen adduct reverts to the parent complex upon heating or purging the solution with an inert gas, signaled by a colour change from orange back to yellow.

== Spectroscopy ==
Infrared spectroscopy can be used to analyse the products of oxidative addition to Vaska's complex because the reactions induce characteristic shifts of the stretching frequency of the coordinated carbon monoxide. These shifts are dependent on the amount of π-back bonding allowed by the newly associated ligands. The CO stretching frequencies for Vaska's complex and oxidatively added ligands have been documented in the literature.

- Vaska's complex: 1967 cm^{−1}
- Vaska's complex + O_{2}: 2015 cm^{−1}
- Vaska's complex + MeI: 2047 cm^{−1}
- Vaska's complex + I_{2}: 2067 cm^{−1}

Oxidative addition to give Ir(III) products reduces the π-bonding from Ir to C, which causes the increase in the frequency of the carbonyl stretching band. The stretching frequency change depends upon the ligands that have been added, but the frequency is always greater than 2000 cm^{−1} for an Ir(III) complex.

== History ==
The earliest mention of IrCl(CO)(PPh_{3})_{2} is by Vaska and DiLuzio. The closely related IrBr(CO)(PPh_{3})_{2} was described in 1959 by Maria Angoletta, who prepared the complex by the treating IrBr(CO)_{2}(p-toluidine) with PPh_{3} in acetone solution. In 1957, Linda Vallerino had reported RhCl(CO)(PPh_{3})_{2}.
