= Kiino Villand =

American photographer of Estonian origin

Kiino Villand (born 1970), born to Estonian emigre family in the United States, is a Los Angeles–based DJ and commercial photographer best known for his photographs of personalities from the worlds of film, music, art and culture. His editorial and advertising work has appeared in publications such as Rolling Stone, Emmy, Juxtapoz V-Life, i-D, RES, Tokion, Entertainment Weekly, Elle and W. He has worked with people such as David Lynch, Vanessa Traina, Adrien Brody, the Gracie Family, 30 Seconds to Mars, A.i., Monica Bellucci, Oliver Stone, Kevin Bacon, Tony Hawk, Beastie Boys, Futura 2000, Shepard Fairey, Jared Leto, Ray Liotta, Weezer, Los Angeles Mayor Eric Garcetti, Conductor Neeme Järvi and the Estonian National Football Team. His other clients include Activision (Guitar Hero), Ogilvy & Mather, Saatchi & Saatchi/Singapore, Lambesis, DC Shoes, Interscope, Virgin Mobile, Film Finances Inc. and Ferragamo.

Collectors of his photography include Eddie Cruz (Stussy/Union/Undefeated), Peter Morton (Hard Rock Hotel & Casino/Mortons West Hollywood) and Sal Masekela (ESPN/E!Netoworks on-camera host). His directorial debut is a documentary on the drummer Jose Medeles of The Breeders entitled Meaning and Rhetoric, The Sonic Explorations of Jose Medeles. His other directing projects include music videos, spots and short films for fashion designers.

== Exhibitions ==
- 2013 Group Show, "Two Beginnings", LEP-ESTO 2013, San Francisco
- 2013 Group Show, "Nothing's Precious", Innocnts Gallery, Los Angeles
- 2012 Group Show, "Art For Tibet 4", Tibet House, NYC
- 2012 Group Show, "TKU and Karmablast Art Show", Art Share, Los Angeles
- 2011 Dabball; Interactive Art Gallery App, (dabball.com/kiinovilland/)
- 2011 Group Show, "To Japan From LA With Love", Space 15Twenty, Los Angeles
- 2011 Group Show, MOPLA Opening (Month of Photography LA, presented by the Lucie Awards), Pier 59 Studios West, Santa Monica
- 2011 Group Show, "Art For Tibet", Joshua Liner Gallery, NYC
- 2010 Group Show, "Re:Form School", 233 Mott St. NYC
- 2010 Group Show, "Manifest Equality", Los Angeles
- 2010 Group Show, "Art For Tibet", Union Gallery Annex, NYC
- 2009 Group Show, "Viva Variety", Palihouse, West Hollywood
- 2009 Group Show, "Flux Presents: The Cooper Video Wall", Los Angeles
- 2008 Solo Show, "Classics//Classics in the Making", Art For Empty Walls Gallery
- 2008 Group Show, "Venice Art Walls Benefit Auction", G2 Gallery, Venice, CA
- 2008 Group Show, "Stoked Sessions", Grind Art & Print Gallery, Los Angeles
- 2006 Solo Show, "Meaning & Rhetoric", The Social Trust, Los Angeles
- 2005 Group Show, "First in Flight", Peel Studio, Hollywood
- 2002 Group Show, "Faces of Rock", benefiting City of Hope Cancer Center, Quixote Studios, Hollywood
- 1999-2000 Solo Show, "NEWYORKSANFRANCISCOLOSANGELES", Union/LaBrea, Hollywood
- 1994 Solo Show, Limelight, New York City
- 1990 Solo Show, Red Zone, New York

== Kiino Villand, DJ ==
After photographing internationally acclaimed DJs over the years for numerous magazine assignments, Villand learned to DJ as well. Since summer 2012, he's been playing regular Thursday night DJ sets at The Standard Hotel (Hollywood). The poolside lounge event known as "On The 12s" features a broad spectrum of innovative as well as timeless music. Prior to his current residency, The Standard has booked him intermittently since 2006. Villand's other DJ projects include events for film distributor IM Global, Sweet Blackberry, Gobble Gobble Give, Resfest, Stussy Worldtour, Quiksilver, art gallery receptions for Kostas Seremetis and Action Kivu. He's also played several Flux events @ The Hollywood Roosevelt (Tropicana), Hammer Museum, Geisha House, The Egyptian Theater and more.
