= Antanas Klimas =

- Born: April 17, 1924; Pelekonys, Lithuania
- Died: September 18, 2016 (aged 92); Brighton, New York, US
- Occupation: linguist
- Known for: comparative linguistics of Baltic, Slavic and Germanic languages

Antanas Klimas (Lithuanian pronunciation: [ɐnˈtaːnɐs ˈkʲlʲɪmɐs]; April 17, 1924 in Pelekonys–18 September 2016 in Brighton) was a prominent Lithuanian professor, onomastician and comparative linguist specializing in the relationships between Baltic, Slavic and Germanic language groups as well as the history of the Lithuanian language. He also created Lithuanian textbooks and dictionaries, was the editor for the language journal Lituanus, and published academic articles on Lithuanian and Indo-European linguistics. Klimas wrote more than 130 publications about linguistics and made significant contributions to the comparative linguistics of Baltic, Slavic and Germanic languages. He also researched Lithuanian anthroponymy, word formation, phonology and morphology.

== Career ==
From 1941 to 1943, Klimas studied Lithuanian linguistics and philosophy at Vytautas Magnus University. In 1942, he graduated from the Kaunas Teacher Seminary. In 1944, as the Red Army troops began re-occupying Lithuania, he fled the country. From 1946 to 1947, Klimas studied linguistics and German at the former Baltic University of the University of Hamburg. In 1948, he resettled in the United States and continued his studies at the University of Pennsylvania, Philadelphia, in Alfred Senn's class up until 1950. In 1956, Klimas completed his Ph.D. In 1970, he became a member of Lithuanian Catholic Academy of Science.

1950 to 1957, he was a lecturer at the University of Pennsylvania. From 1957 to 1989, he worked at the University of Rochester, New York, where he taught German language courses, Indo-European, Baltic, and Slavic linguistics. He began as an Assistant Professor, then became an Associate Professor. In time, he became a Full Professor. In 1989, upon his retirement, he was awarded the title of Professor Emeritus. He died on September 18, 2016, in Brighton, New York.

== Selected bibliography ==
- 1966–1999 Introduction to Modem Lithuanian (Dabartinės lietuvių kalbos įvadas), with L. Dambriūnas and William R. Schmalstieg
- 1967 Lithuanian Reader for Self-Instruction (Lietuvių kalbos skaitiniai savimokai), with William R. Schmalstieg
- 1977, 2010 Key to the Exercises for Introduction to Modern Lithuanian and Beginner's Lithuanian
- 1971 Lithuanian-English Glossary of Linguistic Terminology (Lietuvių-anglų kalbų kalbotyros terminų žodynėlis), with William R. Schmalstieg
- 1999 Lithuanian Diminutive Noun Dictionary (Lietuvių kalbos mažybinių (maloninių) daiktavardžių žodynėlis), Vilnius
- 2005 Lithuanian Sound Word Dictionary (Lietuvių kalbos garsažodžių žodynėlis), Kaunas
- 2005 Lithuanian Homonym Dictionary (Lietuvių kalbos homonimų žodynėlis)
- 1993 The Usage of Participle in Lithuanian Language (Lietuvių kalbos dalyvių vartosena), Vilnius
- 2002–2003 The Ornaments of a Language (Kalbos puošmenos ir pabiros), Vilnius
