= Baltic University =

Temporary university for displaced persons after WW II

Coordinates: 53°38′35″N 9°47′12″E

The Baltic University in Exile was established in the displaced persons camps in Germany to educate refugees from Estonia, Latvia and Lithuania in the aftermath of the Second World War.

The University was established at Hamburg in the British Zone of Occupation in March 1946, with aid from UNRRA, the Lutheran World Federation, and other groups. In early 1947, it was moved to a former Luftwaffe barracks in Pinneberg (Eggerstedt-Kaserne) and renamed the Displaced Person's Study Centre. The author of the idea of opening a university for the Baltic refugees abroad was Latvian physicist and professor Fricis Gulbis, also the first president of the Baltic University (1946–1948). The University's following presidents were Vladas Stanka (1948–1949) and Eduards Šturms (1949), assisted by three (Estonian, Latvian and Lithuanian) national rectors. The Estonian astronomer Ernst Öpik became its first Estonian rector, Latvian historian Edgars Dunsdorfs the first Latvian rector and the Lithuanian archaeologist, Jonas Puzinas, was Lithuanian rector from April 1948 to September 1949. Because many of the staff and students had found homes in other countries, the University was closed in September 1949.

A total of 76 students graduated from the Baltic University in its short existence: 53 of them were Latvian, 16 Lithuanian, and 7 Estonian. Many others went on to complete their studies at other universities. Three male student fraternities, Fraternitas Imantica, Gersicania and Fraternitas Cursica, and two female, Spīdola and Zinta, were founded in Pinneberg. An Estonian corporation, Fraternitas Ucuensis, was founded in 1948.

In 1947 it was written that "The Baltic DP university with about 170 professors on the teaching staff and 1,200 students in eight faculties and 13 subdivisions has been running for three semester."

== People associated with the university ==
- Mykolas Biržiška
- Viktoras Biržiška
- Teodoras Daukantas
- Aleksis Dreimanis
- Pāvils Dreijmanis
- Antanas Klimas
- Eižens Laube
- Ilse Lehiste
- Ernst Öpik
- Jonas Puzinas
- Lauri Vaska
- Arthur Võõbus
