= Ilse Lehiste =

American linguist (1922–2010)

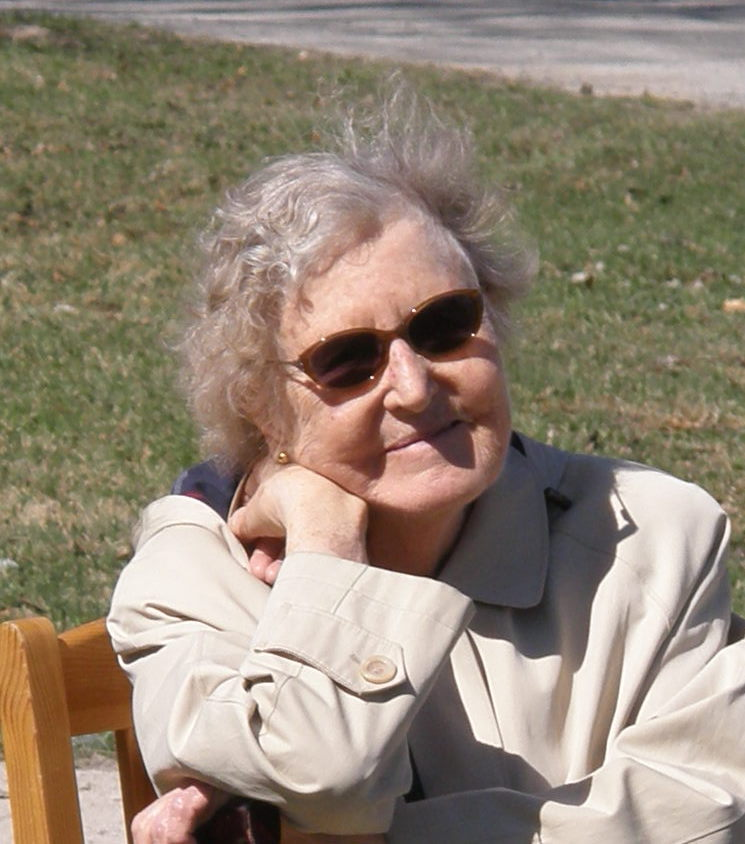
- Ilse Lehiste in 2009
- Born: Tallinn, Estonia
- Died: Worthington, Ohio, U.S.

Academic background
- Education: University of Tartu; University of Hamburg; University of Michigan
- Thesis: An acoustic-phonetic study of internal open juncture

Academic work
- Discipline: linguistics
- Institutions: Baltic University in Exile; Kansas Wesleyan University; Detroit Institute of Technology; Ohio State University
- Main interests: phonetics

Ilse Lehiste (/ˈɪlzə ləˈhɪstə/ IL-zə lə-HIST-ə; 31 January 1922 – 25 December 2010) was an Estonian-born American linguist, author of many studies in phonetics.

== Early life ==
Ilse Lehiste finished high school in Tallinn. In 1942 she began her studies at the Faculty of Philosophy at the University of Tartu. In 1944 she fled to Germany with her parents, where she continued her studies – while living in refugee camps – at the University of Hamburg.

== Academic life and work ==
She obtained a doctoral degree in philology in 1948 at the University of Hamburg with a thesis on Old Norse, after which she taught at the Baltic University in Exile. In 1949 she immigrated to the United States. She taught at Kansas Wesleyan University and the Detroit Institute of Technology, before beginning studies at the University of Michigan. She defended her second doctoral thesis – in linguistics – in 1959 at the University of Michigan. Her dissertation, "An acoustic-phonetic study of internal open juncture," was published as a special issue of Phonetica (DOI:10.1159/000258062).

After working at the University of Michigan Communication Sciences Laboratory as a research associate from 1959 to 1963, she joined the faculty of the Slavic Department of the Ohio State University in 1963. She was a founding member and the first chair of the Linguistics Department at OSU, established in 1965. She remained at OSU as professor emerita after her retirement in 1987.

Her main fields of research were acoustic phonetics and phonology, prosody, language contacts, Estonian and Serbo-Croatian.

She was also interested in Estonian runic songs and, in collaboration with Jaan Ross, published several works on this topic (e.g., Ross & Lehiste 2001). During the Soviet occupation of Estonia, she helped to mediate research papers between Estonia and the free world.

It was also thanks to her that the 11th International Congress of Phonetic Sciences (ICPhS) in 1987 was arranged in Tallinn.

Her papers are archived at the American Philosophical Society.

== Honors and functions ==
Honorary doctor at University of Essex, Lund University, University of Tartu and Ohio State University.

Foreign member of the Finnish Academy of Science and Letters and of the Estonian Academy of Sciences.

President of the Association for the Advancement of Baltic Studies (AABS) (1974-1976)

President of the Linguistic Society of America (1980); elected Fellow of the Linguistic Society of America in 2006.

Medal for Scientific Achievement, International Speech Communication Association, 2002.

== Bibliography ==
Ilse Lehiste wrote or co-authored around 20 books and 200 research papers and criticism. A few key publications are listed below:

Ilse Lehiste. Segmental and Syllabic Quantity in Estonian. American Studies in Uralic Linguistics, vol. 1. Bloomington: Indiana University. (1960)

Ilse Lehiste. Suprasegmentals. (1970) Cambridge, Massachusetts: MIT Press

Ilse Lehiste. Readings in Acoustic Phonetics. (1977) Cambridge, Massachusetts: MIT Press

Ilse Lehiste & Pavle Ivić. Word and Sentence Prosody in Serbocroatian. (1986) Cambridge, Massachusetts: MIT Press

Ilse Lehiste. Lectures on Language Contact. (1988) Cambridge, Massachusetts: MIT Press

Jaan Ross & Ilse Lehiste. The Temporal Structure of Estonian Runic Songs. (2001) Berlin: Mouton de Gruyter
