= Ernst Wahle =

German archaeologist

Ernst Wahle (March 25, 1889, in Magdeburg – January 21, 1981) was a German archaeologist.

He taught at Heidelberg University. In 1937 he joined the Nazi Party.

== Literary works ==
- Die Besiedelung Südwestdeutschlands in vorrömischer Zeit nach ihren natürlichen Grundlagen. Ber. RGK 12, 1920, 1-75.
- Deutsche Vorzeit (German Prehistory), (1932)
- Vorzeit am Oberrhein (Prehistory of the Upper Rhine), 1937
- Frühgeschichte des Germanentums. In: Neue Propyläen-Weltgeschichte Bd. 2 (1940)
- Zur ethnischen Deutung frühgeschichtlicher Kulturprovinzen. Grenzen der frühgeschichtlichen Erkenntnis. Sitzungsber. Heidelberger Akad. Wiss., Phil.-Hist. Kl. 2. Abh. 1 (Heidelberg 1941)
- Frühgeschichte als Landesgeschichte, 1943
- Studien zur Geschichte der prähistorischen Forschung. Abh. Heidelberger Akad. Wiss., Phil.-hist. Kl. (Heidelberg 1950)
- Ur- und Frühgeschichte im mitteleuropäischen Raum. (B. Gebhardt (Hrsg.), Handbuch der deutschen Geschichte 1) (9. Aufl. München 1999)
- Frühgeschichte weiter gefragt? Zur Situation einer 'belasteten' Wissenschaft. Die Zeit v. 21.8.1947
- Einheit und Selbständigkeit der prähistorischen Forschung. Schr. Ges. Freunde Mannheims u. d. ehem. Kurpfalz 12 (Mannheim 1974)
- Und es ging mit ihm seinen Weg (Heidelberg 1980) - Autobiographie
