= Mykolas Biržiška =

Lithuanian professor, diplomat and politician (1882–1962)

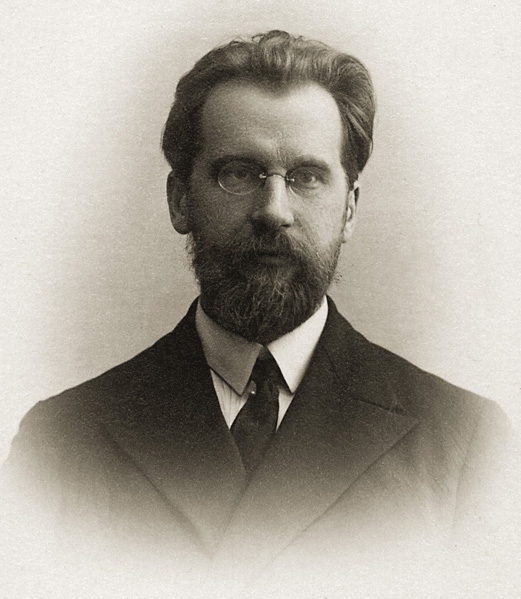
- Born: 24 August 1882; Viekšniai, Lithuania
- Died: 24 August 1962 (aged 80); Los Angeles, United States
- Resting place: Calvary Cemetery reburied at Rasos Cemetery in 2018
- Education: Imperial Moscow University (expelled, later graduated)
- Occupations: Lawyer, professor
- Known for: Signatory of the Act of Independence of Lithuania
- Political party: LSDP
- Spouse: Bronislava Biržiškienė
- Children: Maria Zymantas and Anna Barauskas

Mykolas Biržiška (Polish: Michał Birżyszka; 24 August 1882, in Viekšniai – 24 August 1962, in Los Angeles), a Lithuanian editor, historian, professor of literature, diplomat, and politician, was one of the twenty signatories of the Act of Independence of Lithuania.

== Biography ==
Biržiška was born in a Polish-speaking noble Lithuanian family which used the surname Birżyszko. His grandfather, Leonard Birżyszko, took part in the Uprising of 1831 against Russian rule and also supported the insurgents of the Uprising of 1863 who fought in the vicinity of his estate in Pailgotis, where wounded insurgents were treated. Mykolas' father, Antanas Biržiška, was eight years old at the outbreak of the January Uprising. He did not engage in politics, although, according to Mykolas, "he was attached to his country and its people and valued Lithuanian traditions." He did not come into conflict with the Russian authorities.

Mykolas’s mother, Elżbieta née Rodziewicz, was proud of her distant kinship with Tadeusz Kościuszko. In their home, she kept "Kościuszko’s quilt," which was regarded as a relic. Although the memory of Lithuanian history and identity were alive in the Birżyszko household, Mykolas and his siblings were raised, mainly by the mother, as Polish patriots, harboring a discreet hostility toward the Russian Empire. His father, although he knew the Samogitian language, did not pass it on to his children, who spoke only Polish in their childhood.

His first contacts with the Lithuanian national movement occurred at the Gymnasium in Šiauliai, which was attended by many students with a modern Lithuanian national identity. Mykolas Biržiška was initially rejected by them as a Pole and a nobleman. It was only through his interactions with a schoolmate Povilas Urbšys that Biržiška became acquainted with the Lithuanian movement and was prompted to learn the language.

Biržiška was twice expelled from the Gymnasium in Šiauliai after refusing to attend Orthodox services, and after organising a Lithuanian evening, although later was allowed to finish the studies. In the Russian census of 1897, Mykolas Biržiška declared himself to be Polish, although his brothers Vaclovas and Viktoras and his father registered as Samogitians. He later regretted this declaration. Biržiška ultimately declared himself a Lithuanian while studying in Moscow.

He graduated from law school at the Imperial Moscow University in 1907. He was arrested at a student meeting in 1902 for advocating Lithuanian causes and served part of a two-year sentence, but succeeded in regaining admission to the university. After returning to Vilnius, he became involved in the independence movement, frequently contributing articles to periodicals and later working with the War Relief Committee. at the time he was also working as assistant of Tadeusz Wróblewski. In 1915 he became principal of the first Lithuanian high school in Vilnius.

Together with his fellows he wrote a letter for US President Woodrow Wilson asking for support for Independence of Lithuania.

In 1918 he was elected a member of the Council of Lithuania, and signed the act in 1918. He served briefly as Minister of Education in the Second Cabinet of Ministers. During his service on the post, he was busy preparing to reopen Vilnius University, and ordered for the Belarusian Gymnasium of Vilnia to open.

After the threat of the Soviet westward offensive, the Lithuanian government withdrew from Vilnius to Kaunas on January 2, 1919, he remained there as its official representative. In this role, he protested against the takeover of the city by the Polish Self-Defence of Lithuania and Belarus to its commander, General Władysław Wejtko. After the city was occupied by the Bolsheviks, he remained there, while his brother Vaclovas became the Bolshevik commissioner for education.

After the city was recaptured by the Polish army in April 1919, he began publishing a Polish-language newspaper, Głos Litwy (The Voice of Lithuania), in which he advocated for the incorporation of Vilnius into Lithuania as its capital and engaged in disputes with the Polish press.

On 31 January 1920, Mykolas Biržiška wrote in Lietuvos aidas:

the issue of belonging to a certain nationality is not decided by everyone at will, it is not a matter that can be resolved according to the principles of political liberalism, even one cloaked in democratic slogans.

During the events that preceded the Polish occupation of Vilnius in 1920, Biržiška acted as a negotiator. In summer 1921 he landed in court for an article in newspaper "Straż Litwy", and was defended by attorney Tadeusz Wróblewski. He was one of 32 Lithuanians arrested in January 1922 and expelled formally a month later by decision of Aleksander Meysztowicz, president of Central Lithuania provisional government, from Vilnius and handed over to Lithuanian army.

He moved to Kaunas, the temporary capital, where he became a professor of literature at University of Lithuania. While a professor, he was an editor of the Lithuanian Encyclopedia, and participated in a number of social and cultural organizations. He became founder and chairman of the Union for the Liberation of Vilnius. Biržiška then served as rector of Vilnius University from 1940 to March 1943, and in autumn 1944.

After the second Soviet occupation in 1944, Biržiška went to West Germany, and was a professor at the Baltic University in Hamburg and Pinneberg. He moved to the United States in 1949. He pursued his earliest interests, folklore, and folk dance until his death from a heart attack in 1962.

== Family ==
Biržiška belonged to an eminent noble family. His grandfather Leonardas Biržiška was an active participant in the 1839-1831 Uprising; and his brothers, Vaclovas Biržiška and Viktoras Biržiška, were also leaders of the Lithuanian community. His father, the physician Antanas Biržiška, declined a professorship at the University of Moscow to practice medicine in the rural areas of Lithuania.

He had two daughters, Marija Biržiškaite (Maria Žakevičius Zymantas) and Ona Biržiškaitė Barauskienė (Anna Barauskas), and three grandchildren, Venta Barauskaite Leon, Vytas Barauskas and Danute Barauskaite Mažeikienė.

== Selected bibliography ==
- Skrót dziejów piśmiennictwa litewskiego, 1919 (as Michał Birżyszka)
- Lietuvių dainų literatūros istorija, 1919.
- Mūsų raštų istorija. 1547-1904, expanded later to "Mūsų raštų istorja (nuo 16 a. iki 1864) (1925).
- Dainos kelias,1921.
- Barono gyvenimas ir raštai, 1924.
- Duonelaičio gyvenimas ir raštai, 1927.
- Rinktiniai mūsų senovės raštai, 1927.
- Together with his brother Vaclovas he prepared and published a work by Simonas Daukantas, Darbai senųjų lietuvių ir žemaičių, 1929.
- Aleksandrynas, 3 vol. (1960-1965) Bibliography of Lithuanian writers up to 1865. Primarily Vaclovas' work, but Mykolas served as collaborator and editor after Vaclovas' death in 1956.
- Anuo metu Viekšniuose ir Šiauliuose (memoirs).
- Lietuvių tautos Kelias 2 vol. written in exile in Los Angeles, 1952

== Sources ==
- Borzecki, Jerzy (2008). The Soviet-Polish Peace of 1921 and the creation of interwar Europe. Yale University Press.
- Mačiulis, Dangiras (2018). "W poszukiwaniu tożsamości litewskiej: przypadek Vladasa Putvinskisa, Mykolasa Biržiški i Tadasa Ivanauskasa" [In search of Lithuanian identity: the cases of Vladas Putvinskis, Mykolas Biržiška i Tadas Ivanauskas] (PDF). Studia Podlaskie. 26: 41–58.
- Mačiulis, Dangiras; Staliūnas, Darius (2015). Lithuanian Nationalism and the Vilnius Question, 1883–1940. Marburg: Verlag Herder-Institut. ISBN 978-3-87969-401-3.
