= Jokūbas Minkevičius =

Lithuanian politician

Jokūbas Minkevičius (27 March 1921 – 5 May 1996) was a Lithuanian politician, born in Ufa, Bashkir ASSR. In 1990 he was among those who signed the Act of the Re-Establishment of the State of Lithuania.
