= Vaclovas Biržiška =

Lithuanian lawyer and writer (1884 - 1956)

- Born: December 2, 1884
- Died: January 3, 1956 (aged 71)

Vaclovas Biržiška (2 December 1884 – 3 January 1956) was a Lithuanian attorney, bibliographer, and educator.

He was a member of a notable Lithuanian family; his great-grandfather Mykolas Biržiška was a representative in the Sejm of the Polish–Lithuanian Commonwealth when the Constitution of 3 May 1791 was accepted; his grandfather Leonardas Biržiška was an active participant in the November Uprising; and his brothers, Mykolas Biržiška and Viktoras Biržiška, were also leaders of the Lithuanian community. His father, the physician Antanas Biržiška, declined a professorship at the University of Moscow to practice medicine in the rural areas of Lithuania.

Biržiška was born in the village of Viekšniai in Samogitia. He studied science and mathematics at the University of St. Petersburg, transferred into the school of law, graduating in 1909, and then practiced law in Vilnius until the outbreak of World War I.

After serving as an officer in the Imperial Russian Army, he worked in Moscow for the office of Lithuanian affairs, as Commissar for Education in Lithuania, and as a teacher in Lithuania. During the conflicts between Lithuania, Poland, and Russia that took place between 1918 and 1920, he served as legal counsel to both Lithuanian and Polish defendants. After Vilnius was annexed by Poland, he moved to the temporary capital of Lithuania, Kaunas.

He served in the Lithuanian Army from 1920 to 1923 as an assistant to the commander of a battalion, as head of a military court, and as head of its educational branch. Returning to academia, he became a professor of law at Vytautas Magnus University as well as a professor of humanities, pursuing his interests in bibliography and library science. He was later dean of the faculty of law at Vilnius University.

After World War II, Biržiška emigrated to West Germany and then to the United States. He served as a consultant to the Library of Congress from 1951 to 1953.

Biržiška contributed heavily to the Lithuanian Encyclopedia, compiling about 400 biographies of Lithuanian authors, and wrote numerous articles describing Lithuanian culture from the 16th to 19th centuries.

== Other notable works ==
- The Lithuanian Bibliography, 5 volumes spanning 1547–1910;
- The History of the Old Lithuanian Books, 2 vol. Chicago 1953–57;
- Aleksandrynas 3 vol, covering biographies, bibliographies, and bio-bibliographies of old Lithuanian authors to 1865.

He also compiled a bibliography of Lithuanian publications in the U.S. from 1875 to 1910, while consulting for the Library of Congress. (Aleksandrynas v.1 foreword)
