= Lisa Kivirist =

American writer

Lisa Cindy Kivirist (born April 14, 1967, in Illinois) is an American author, women-farmer and cottage-food activist, entrepreneur, and writer. She founded the Rural Women's Project. for the Midwest Organic and Sustainable Education Service and started the award-winning Inn Serendipity Bed & Breakfast, a small business completely powered by wind and solar energy generated on site and Wisconsin Travel Green certified.

Kivirist authored the award-finalist Soil Sisters (New Society Publishers) and Kiss Off Corporate America (Andrews McMeel). She also co-authored Homemade for Sale, Farmstead Chef, the award-winning ECOpreneuring and Rural Renaissance with her husband, John D. Ivanko, all published by New Society Publishers

A leading national advocate and spokesperson for women farmers, Kivirist was named by In Business Magazine as a "Woman of Industry" for her leadership growing the women in sustainable agriculture movement. Kivirist is a Senior Fellow, Endowed Chair in Agricultural Systems at the Minnesota Institute for Sustainable Agriculture at the University of Minnesota, focusing on identifying opportunities to champion leadership development among female farmers and rural women. She's also a distinguished member of the IATP Food and Society Fellows and serves on the National Outreach Committee for the Sustainable Agriculture Research Education, the sustainable agriculture division of the United States Department of Agriculture, advocating for a voice for women farmers.

As an activist, Kivirist joined two other farmers in Wisconsin to sue the State of Wisconsin in 2016 over the constitutionality of the state law preventing cookies baked in a home kitchen to be sold to the public.

== Early life and education ==
Raised in Glenview, Illinois, by a first-generation daughter of immigrant refugees from Latvia and Estonia, Kivirist graduated Glenbrook South High School in 1985 and was awarded the Distinguished Alumni Award in 2009. She received her Bachelor of Science from Northwestern University in 1989.

== Career ==
Kivirist started out working at Leo Burnet Advertising, USA, in Chicago in account management, after which she ran event marketing programs for Johnnie Walker. In 1997, Kivirist started Inn Serendipity Bed & Breakfast, a two-bedroom inn created on a 5.5-acre farm in Browntown, Wisconsin, that she and her husband farm organically and is focused on sustainability. The Inn received the 2004 Energy Star Small Business Network Award from the United States Environmental Protection Agency. Vegetarian breakfasts are vegetarian and prepared mostly with ingredients sourced on site

Lisa Kivirist authored Soil Sisters and Kiss Off Corporate America. With John Ivanko, Lisa Kivirist co-authored Homemade for Sale, Farmstead Chef, ECOpreneuring and Rural Renaissance. As a writer, Kivirist contributes to Mother Earth News, Hobby Farms, Natural Awakenings and many other magazines.

Kivirist founded and leads the Rural Women's Project of the Midwest Organic and Sustainable Education Service (MOSES). In collaboration with other women farmers and the South Central Chapter of the Wisconsin Farmers Union and the Wisconsin Farmers Union Foundation, Renewing the Countryside and the Midwest Organic and Sustainable Education Service, Kivirist guided the development of Soil Sisters: A Celebration of Wisconsin Farms and Rural Life, which has now grown to an annual weekend showcasing women farmers and rural revitalization. Wisconsin Governor Scott Walker proclaimed that time frame "Wisconsin Women in Sustainable and Organic Agriculture Week." In partnership with the Minnesota Institute for Sustainable Agriculture and Farm Commons, Kivirist led development of the on-farm food businesses resource: Diversify Your Minnesota Farm Business Through Food Service: A How-to Manual for Serving Food on Your Farm, from Farm-To-Table Dinners to Pizza Farms and More

== Personal life ==
Lisa C. Kivirist is married to John D. Ivanko, and have one son, Liam Ivanko Kivirist. Kivirist accompanied her son, Liam Kivirist, to The White House for a Kids’ State Dinner with President Barack Obama and First Lady, Michelle Obama, related to his award-winning Wisconsin solar oven simmered chili recipe submitted to the Healthy Lunchtime Challenge and Let's Move.
