= Vytenis Rimkus =

Lithuanian painter and encyclopedist (1930–2020)

Vytenis Rimkus (17 January 1930 – 12 November 2020) was a Lithuanian painter and encyclopedist from the Siauliai district municipality. He was sent to the gulag for anti-Soviet activity. After his release he attended and graduated from an art school in Leningrad.
