= Viekšniai =

- Town
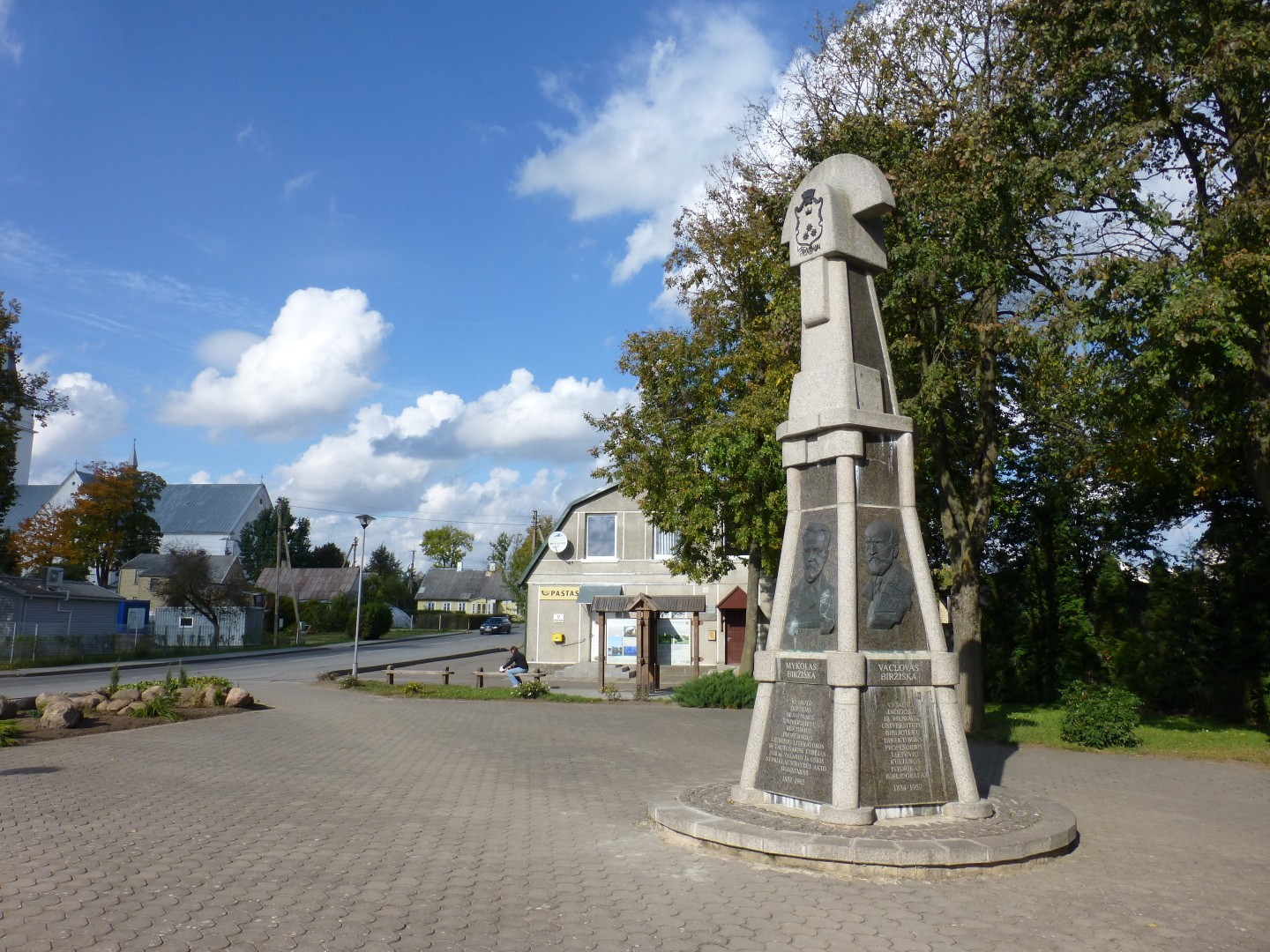
- Viekšniai Town Square in Sept., 2012

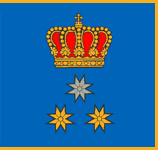
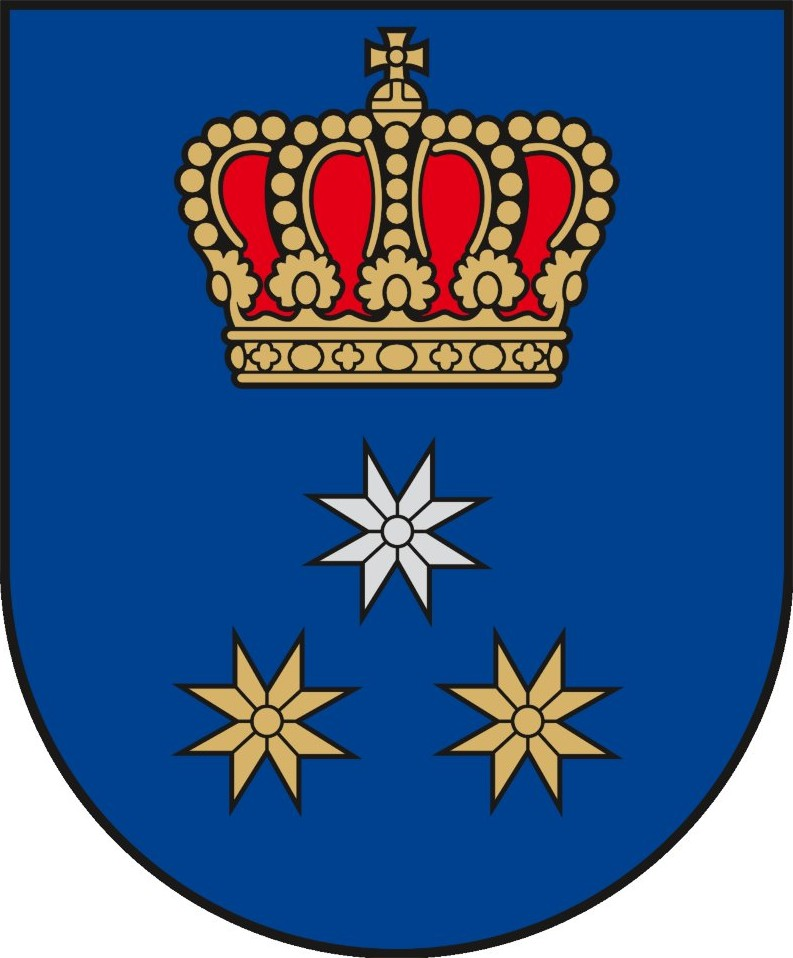
- Flag Coat of arms

- Location of Viekšniai
- Coordinates: 56°14′0″N 22°31′0″E
- Country: Lithuania
- Ethnographic region: Samogitia
- County: Telšiai County
- Municipality: Mažeikiai district municipality
- Eldership: Viekšniai eldership
- Capital of: Viekšniai eldership
- First mentioned: 1253
- Granted city rights: 1725

Population (2023)
  - Total: 2,180
- Time zone: UTC+2 (EET)
  - Summer (DST): UTC+3 (EEST)

Viekšniai ( Samogitian: Vėikšnē, Yiddish: וועקשנע Vekshne, Polish: Wieksznie) is a town in the Mažeikiai district municipality, Lithuania. It is located 17 km (11 mi) south-east of Mažeikiai. The etymology of the town's name probably comes from a former lake near Viekšniai.

== Jewish history ==
The town had a large Jewish population prior to the outbreak of World War 2. At the beginning of the 20th century, there were 3 synagogues, several Jewish primary schools, and a yeshiva.

According to the 1897 Russian Census, of the total population of 2,951, 1,646 were Jews.

In the summer of 1941, over 400 Jews from the town were murdered in Mažeikiai, along with other Jews of the district.

== Notable people ==
- Mykolas Biržiška, historian and politician who was a signatory of the Act of Independence of Lithuania
