= Viktoras Biržiška =

- Born: February 23, 1886; Viekšniai, Mažeikiai District, Lithuania
- Died: January 27, 1964 (aged 77); Chicago, Illinois, United States
- Occupations: Mathematician; political figure
- Political party: Social Democratic Party of Lithuania
- Father: Antanas Biržiška
- Relatives: Mykolas Biržiška (brother); Vaclovas Biržiška (brother)
- Family: Biržiškos

Viktoras Biržiška (February 23, 1886 – January 27, 1964) was a Lithuanian mathematician, engineer, journalist, and encyclopedist of noble extraction. His brothers were Mykolas Biržiška and Vaclovas Biržiška.

== Biography ==
He was the youngest of the three Biržiška brothers, sons of Antanas and Elžbieta Biržiska, all who contributed significantly to the Lithuanian National Revival. He studied mathematics and engineering at the University of St. Petersburg in Russia between 1904 and 1908, and later at the Saint Petersburg State Institute of Technology from 1909 to 1914.

After completing his studies, he was appointed a director at a munitions factory in St. Petersburg from 1914 to 1920. He was imprisoned by the Bolsheviks and only returned to Lithuania following a prisoner exchange. While in Vilnius he taught at the Lithuanian High School, worked with the Committee for the Liberation of Vilnius, and edited Lithuanian newspapers in both the Polish and Russian languages. As a result of his activities he was arrested for treason by the Polish authorities on February 5, 1922 and was almost shot. Through the intervention of the League of Nations, he was exiled to Lithuania together with his brother Mykolas Biržiška and thirty-one other Lithuanians and Belarusians.

His activities in Vilnius during the years of 1920–1922, and his struggle with the Polish authorities are elaborated upon in his book Neužgijusios Žaizdos (Open Wounds), 1936, 2nd ed. 1967

He held the position of Professor of Mathematics and Chief of the Mathematical seminar at Vytautas Magnus University, and later from 1940–1944 at Vilnius University. When the Red Army re-invaded Lithuania in 1944, he went into exile in the West. He worked as a professor at the Baltic University, founded in Hamburg, and later moved to Pinneberg. In 1950 he emigrated to the U.S., and resided in Chicago until his death.

In July 2018, the remains of Mykolas Biržiška, his wife Bronislava, brothers Vaclavas and Viktoras were brought at the Vilnius University in Church of St. Johns.

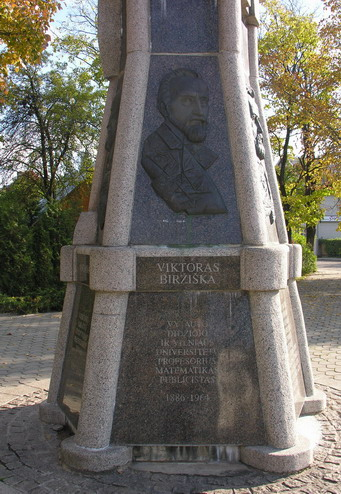
Monument for three brothers Biržiška built in Viekšniai picturing Viktoras Biržiška

== Publications ==
He published more than thirty scientific works and textbooks in Lithuanian, Polish and Russian, as well as ca. 300 articles in Encyclopedias and periodicals, mostly in Lithuanian.

- Introduction to the Theory of Functions, Kaunas 1926
- Integral Calculus, Kaunas, 1928
- Mathematical Theory of Probability, Kaunas 1930
- Existence of Generalized Derivatives, Kosmos, Kaunas 1932
- Function. Kaunas, 1934
- Theory of Numbers. Vilnius-Vienna 1940–1944, 2 vols.

Memoirs:

- St. Petersburg at the time of the Bolshevik Revolution, Gyventų Dienų Prisiminimai
- The struggle for Vilnius in Neužgijusios Žaizdos (Open Wounds), 1936, 2nd ed. 1967
- Vol. 3 of Del Mūsų Sostinės, (For Our Capital) Mykolas Biržiška's memoirs of the Polish occupation of Vilnius
