= Nagaika =

Cossack whip

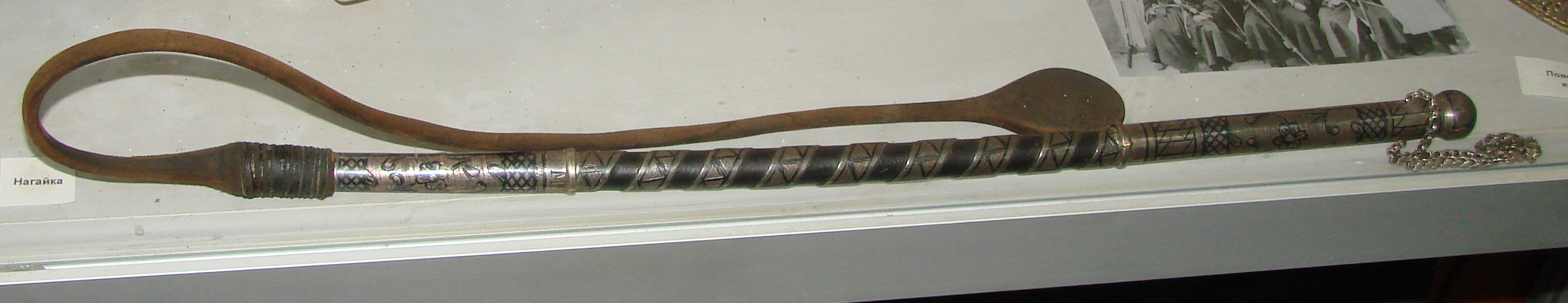
Nagaika

The nagaika, sometimes nagyka (Russian: нага́йка, pronounced [nɐˈɡajkə]) is a short, thick whip with round cross-section used by Cossacks, borrowed from the Nogai people, hence the original name "nogaika", or "Nogai's whip". It is also called камча, kamcha from the Turkic word "kamci" for "whip". The latter word is also used for short whips of Central Asian origin.

== Description ==
The nagaika was made out of leather strips by braiding. It was possible to have a piece of metal at the tip of the whip. A short loop is attached to the handle so that the nagayka would hang from the arm when the grip is released or lost.

The main purpose of a nagaika was to urge a horse to move forward or to gallop. A metal piece was traditionally used as a defense against wolves. According to Vladimir Dahl's "Explanatory Dictionary of the Live Great Russian language", this nagayka was called volkoboy (волкобой, "wolf-slayer").

In modern times the descriptions of the military use of nagaika tend to be mythologized. As in the past, the prime and predominant use was to control or drive a horse. At the same time the nagaika was known to be used against unarmed people, e.g. for corporal punishment or to disperse public disorders (e.g., during Russian Revolutions), so that a mounted cossack using a nagayka against worker or student demonstrators become a symbol of tsarist oppression.

In 2005 the Cossacks were reformed and armed with nagaikas in addition to other traditional weapons.

In 2014, members of Pussy Riot were attacked by Cossacks wielding nagaikas and pepper spray while protesting.

== Russian Imperial Army nagaika ==
Below is an official regulation of the Imperial Russian Army for the nagaikas of the Cossack troops from a 1911 book.

The nagaika (whip) for all Cossack troops, except for the Caucasian ones, consists of: a) a braid, b) a wooden handle, c) a strap braided around the handle, d) a loop for putting on the hand.

The braid is made from two rawhide belts, about 1/2 vershok (22 mm) wide, cut into narrow strips, braiding them together to form a braid 1/4 vershok (11 mm) in diameter. The uncut ends of these belts, folded together, serve to attach the braid to the handle with a rawhide strap, about 1/8 vershok (5.5 mm) thick and of such a length that, having tied the braid to the handle with 9 turns, it would have a free end sufficient for winding the entire handle up to the loop put on the hand. The handle is birch, or some other hard wood, is made ¼ vershok thick and about 10 vershok (44 cm) long. At the opposite end of the handle, at 11/2 vershok, (66 mm) from the end, a rawhide strap, about 1/8 versh. (5-6 mm) wide and about 8 versh. (35-36 cm) long, is passed through a hole drilled in the wood, the ends of which are tied and form a loop for putting on the rider's arm. A rawhide shoulder strap, about 2 arshins 8 versh. (178 cm) long and 3/16-1/4 versh. (8-11 mm) wide, is fastened at one end, by means of a cut made in it, to the loop put on the arm; the other end of the strap is folded in half and tied to the strap with a flat knot, at a distance of 6 versh. (26 cm), from the other end tied to the handle, thus forming a loop about 1 arshin (71 cm) long, which is put on the rider's shoulder.

== Gallery ==
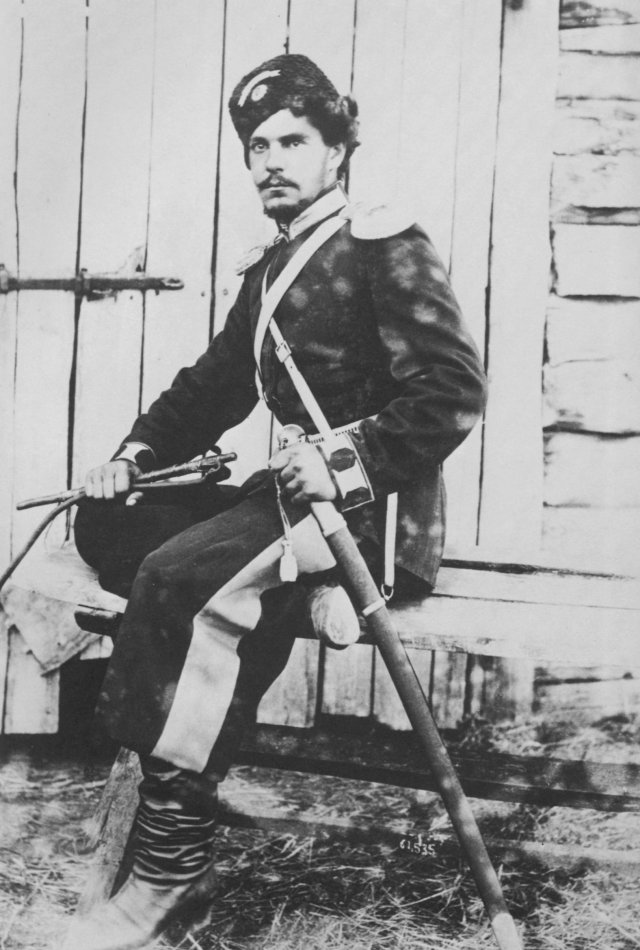
Orenburg Cossack with a whip in his hand

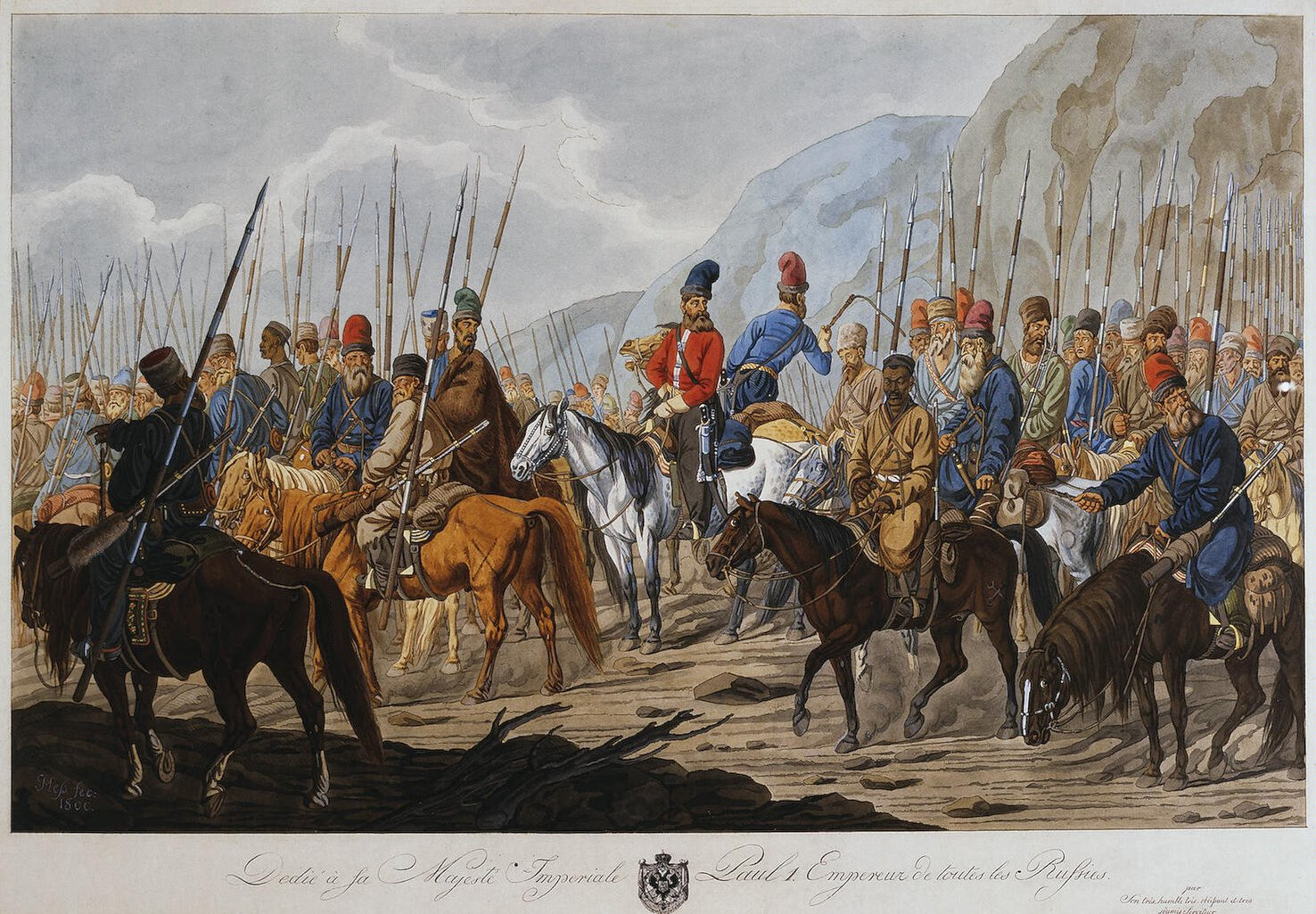
Ural Cossacks on the march. Some riders have nagaikas visible

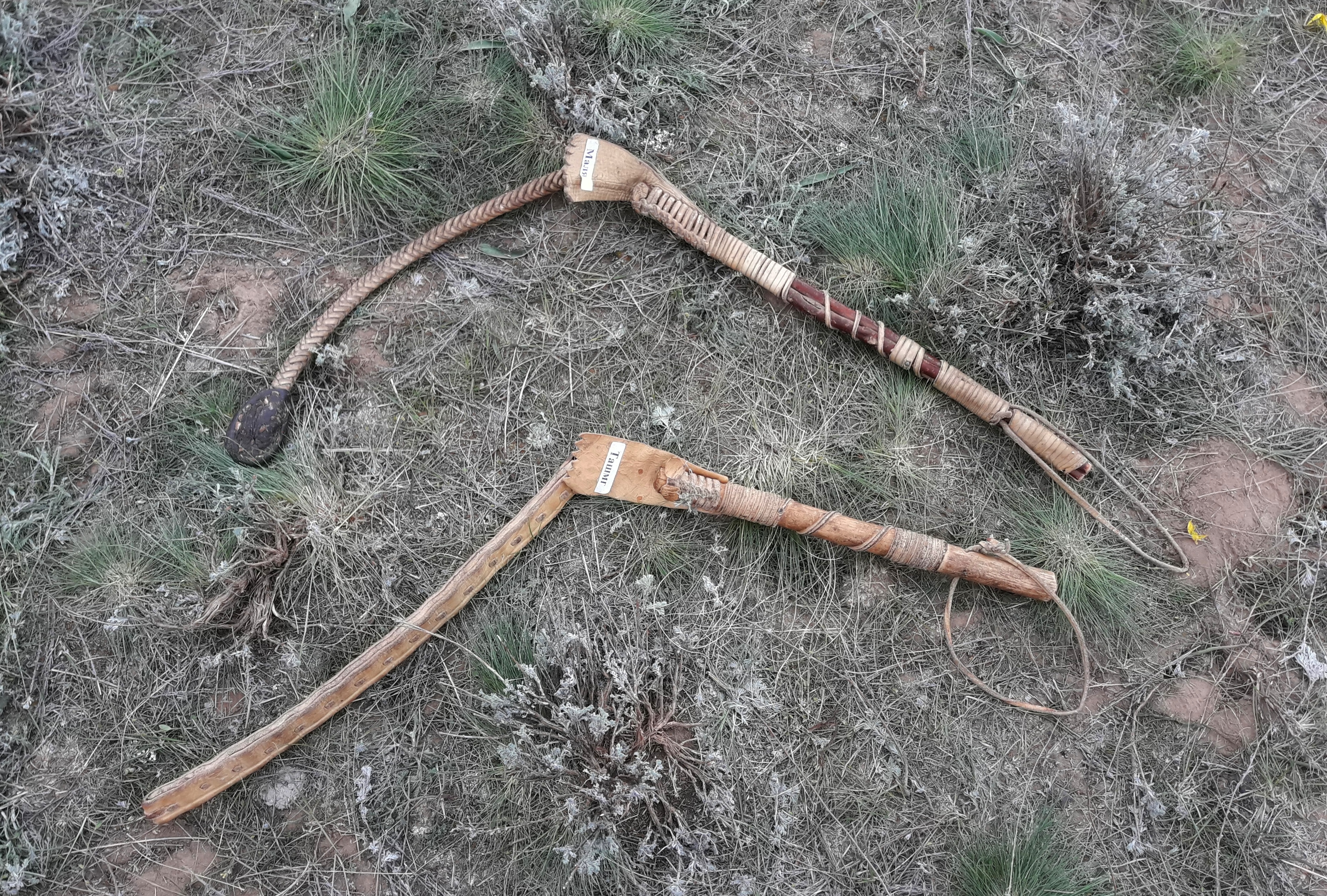
Kalmyk lashes "malia" and "tashmg"

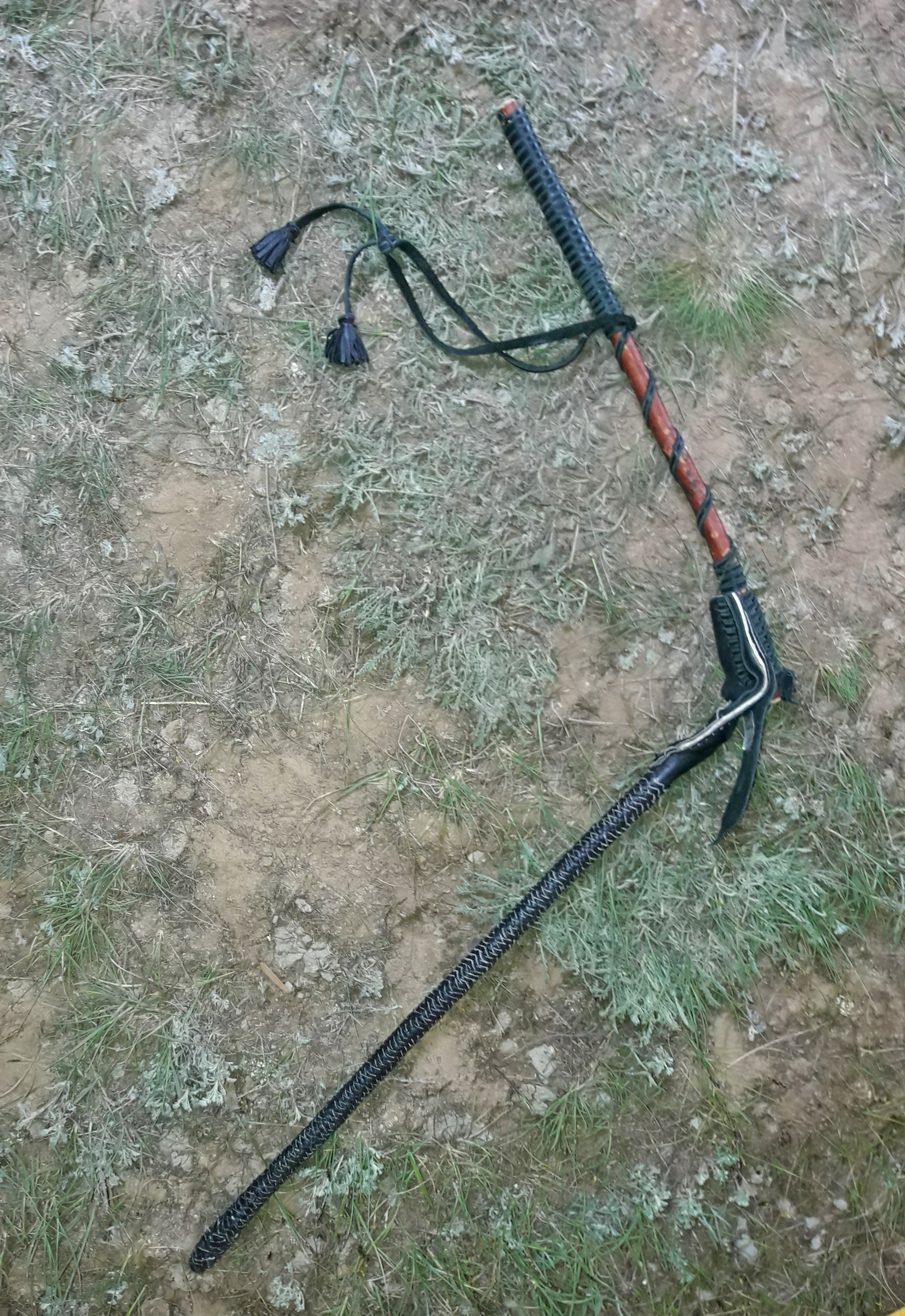
A kind of Kalmyk nagaika with a uniformly tightly woven, almost unbending leather whip without tapering to the tip

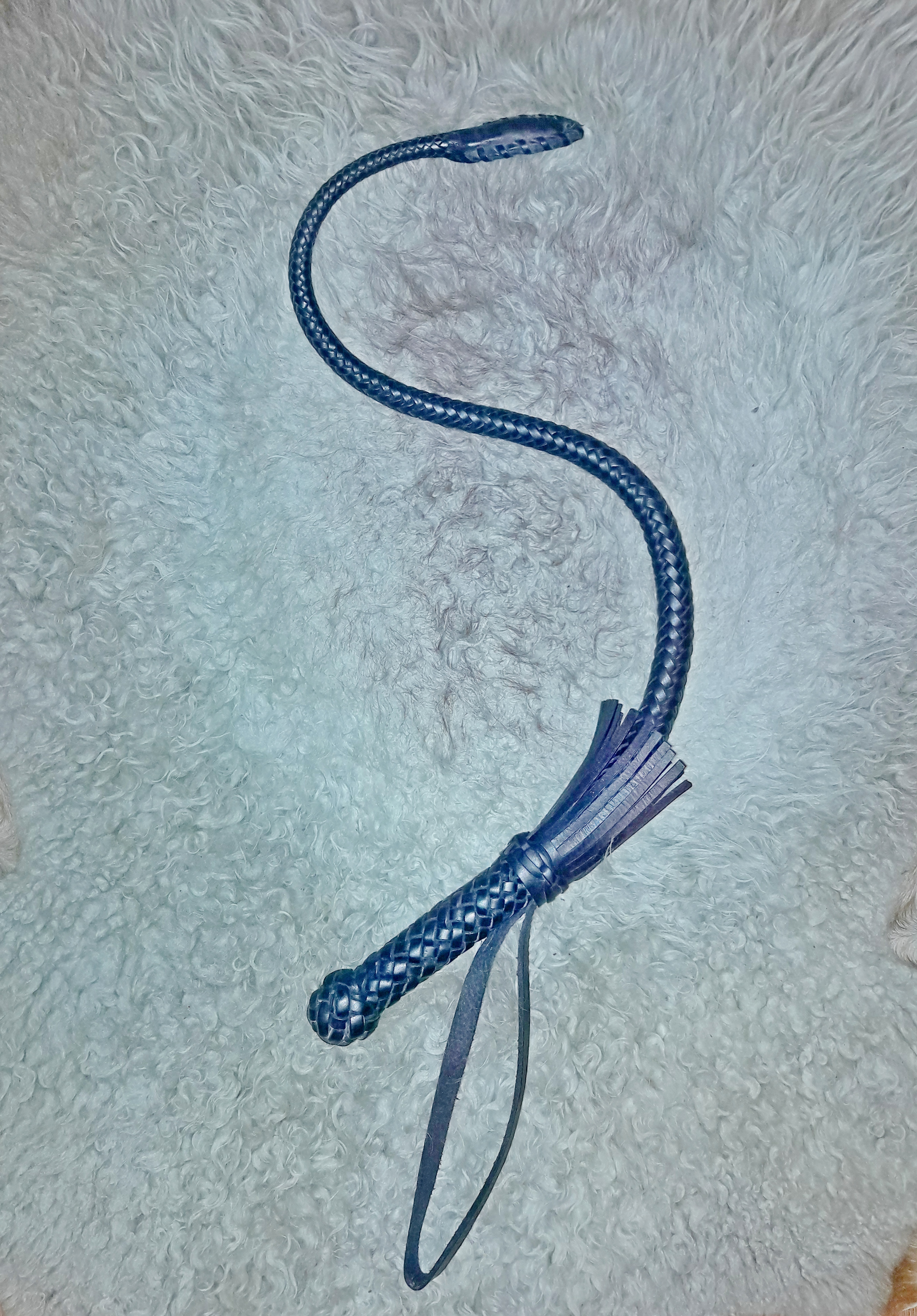
Nagaika of the Kuban and Terek Cossacks

== See also ==
- Horsewhip (disambiguation)
