= Michał Węsławski =

Polish lawyer and mayor (1849–1917)

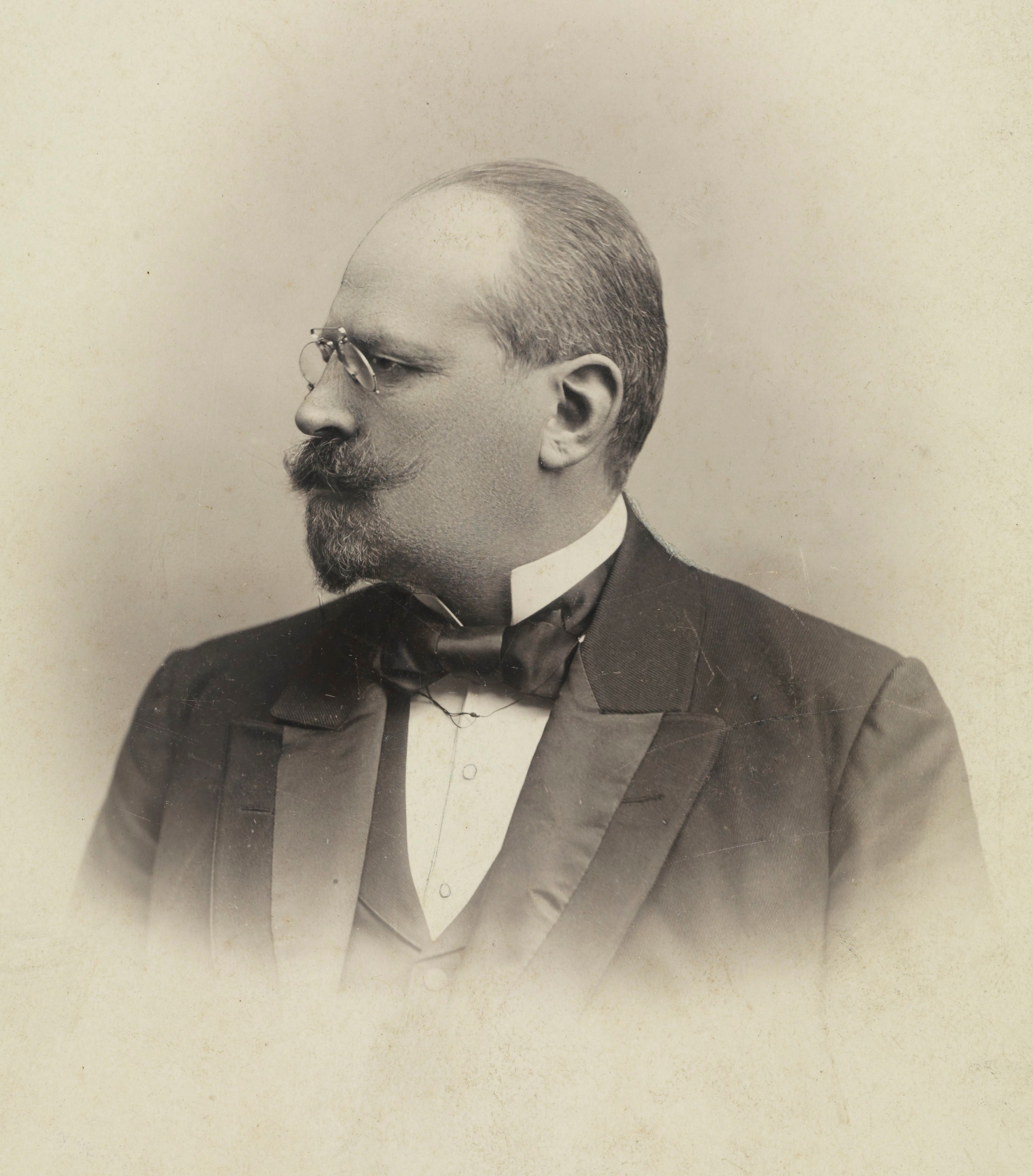
- Węsławski, c. 1910

Mayor of Vilnius
- In office 1906–1916
- Preceded by: Pavel Vasilevich Berthold
- Succeeded by: Marian Dziewicki

Personal details
- Born: Michał Joachim Alojzy Węsławski; 17 September 1849 Gegrėnai, Russian Empire
- Died: 22 August 1917 (aged 67) Vilnius, Ober Ost
- Education: Imperial University in St. Petersburg
- Occupation: Lawyer; politician

Michał Joachim Alojzy Węsławski (Lithuanian: Mykolas Venslauskis; Russian: Михаи́л Анто́нович Венсла́вский; 17 September 1849 – 22 August 1917) was a Polish lawyer and politician who served as the Vilnius city councillor from 1897 to 1905, then mayor (president) from 1905 to 1916, and deputy to the 2nd Russian State Duma. He was the first non-Russian mayor of Vilnius since the January Uprising.

As a lawyer, he took part in the defense of the victims of the so-called Kražiai massacre. He served as mayor of Vilnius for multiple terms but lost his job during the German occupation in 1916. His service to Vilnius includes an attempt to implement a so-called "Europeanization" plan for the city. Prior to the outbreak of World War I, he managed to start the construction of an electric tramway, water supply systems, and sewage systems, which were continued in the interwar period. He recreated theater life in the city after the restrictions imposed following the January Uprising of the 1860s. He also campaigned to reopen a university in Vilnius. During the occupation, the German authorities stripped him of his post as mayor in 1916. He died of a heart attack in 1917, in Vilnius.

Married to Maria Grużewska, he had no children. His brother was Witold Węsławski, a doctor and politician. Witold's son Stanisław Węsławski served as underground mayor of the city during World War II.

== Biography ==
=== Youth and education ===
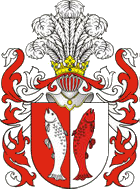
Wadwicz coat of arms used by Węsławski family

Węsławski was born on 17 September 1849 in the family estate in Gegrėnai as the second son of Antoni and Kazimiera née Gadon. He had three siblings brother Stanisław (born 1847), sister Tekla (born 1854) and second brother Witold Jan Narcyz (born 1855). His ancestor was Samuel Węsławski (d. 1690), royal courtier, diplomat, author of memoirs and biography of the Hetman Wincenty Gosiewski. Antoni Węsławski was a landowner, and in his youth fought in the November Uprising as an aide-de-camp to Onufry Jacewicz, commander of the Telšiai troops. Because he also took part in January Uprising, the family estate was taken from him by the Russian government. Antoni was then exiled to Povenets in Karelia, where he stayed until 1868 and lost his eyesight. In that year he was released with a ban on returning to his homeland, so the family settled in the Courland Governorate town of Libava, located only 40 versts (roughly 43 kilometers) from the former estate.

Michał Węsławski received his education at the Šiauliai Gymnasium from 1862 to 1870. Later he studied law, first in Moscow and, after a year, at the Imperial University in St. Petersburg. After completing his apprenticeship, he was appointed in 1876 as an investigating judge in the first district of the city of Chișinău. In 1879, he married Maria Grużewska, who brought the Pakėvis Manor, in Šiauliai county, as a dowry. They had no children, and Maria suffered from mental illness beginning in the 1890s and lived separately from her husband at the Santekliai estate. Santekliai was owned by Maria's daughter Tekla Grużewska. During his childhood Mykolas Biržiška often visited Santekliai with his father.

=== In Vilnius ===
In 1880, Węsławski started to work as a lawyer in St. Petersburg and from 1883 in Vilnius where he lived in the so-called Müller House on the German Street.

From 1888, he became involved with his younger brother Witold (father of Stanisław Węsławski, later an underground mayor of Vilnius during World War II) in creating the structures of secret Polish education, they founded Society of National Education "Oświata". He took part in the works of Vilnius Land Bank (since 1900, as a member of the audit committee) and Vilnius Agrarian Association (1899–1911, until 1906 as a treasurer). He was a member of secret Archeological Circle (1897–1907), Noblemen's Club, and Vilnius Imperial Medical Society. He was also a member from November 1901 of the Society for the Care of Children, which organized summer camps in towns in the Vilnius region. Since 1902 he was a member of the Society for Emergency Medical Care, the society had from two to four ambulances and maintained a permanent duty of doctors and nurses, providing help in the city. Together with his brother Witold, he joined the musical "Lutnia" Society, founded in 1905. He was also member of Vilnius Cyclic Society (since 1908) and Vilnius Artistic society (1908–1915, as a president).

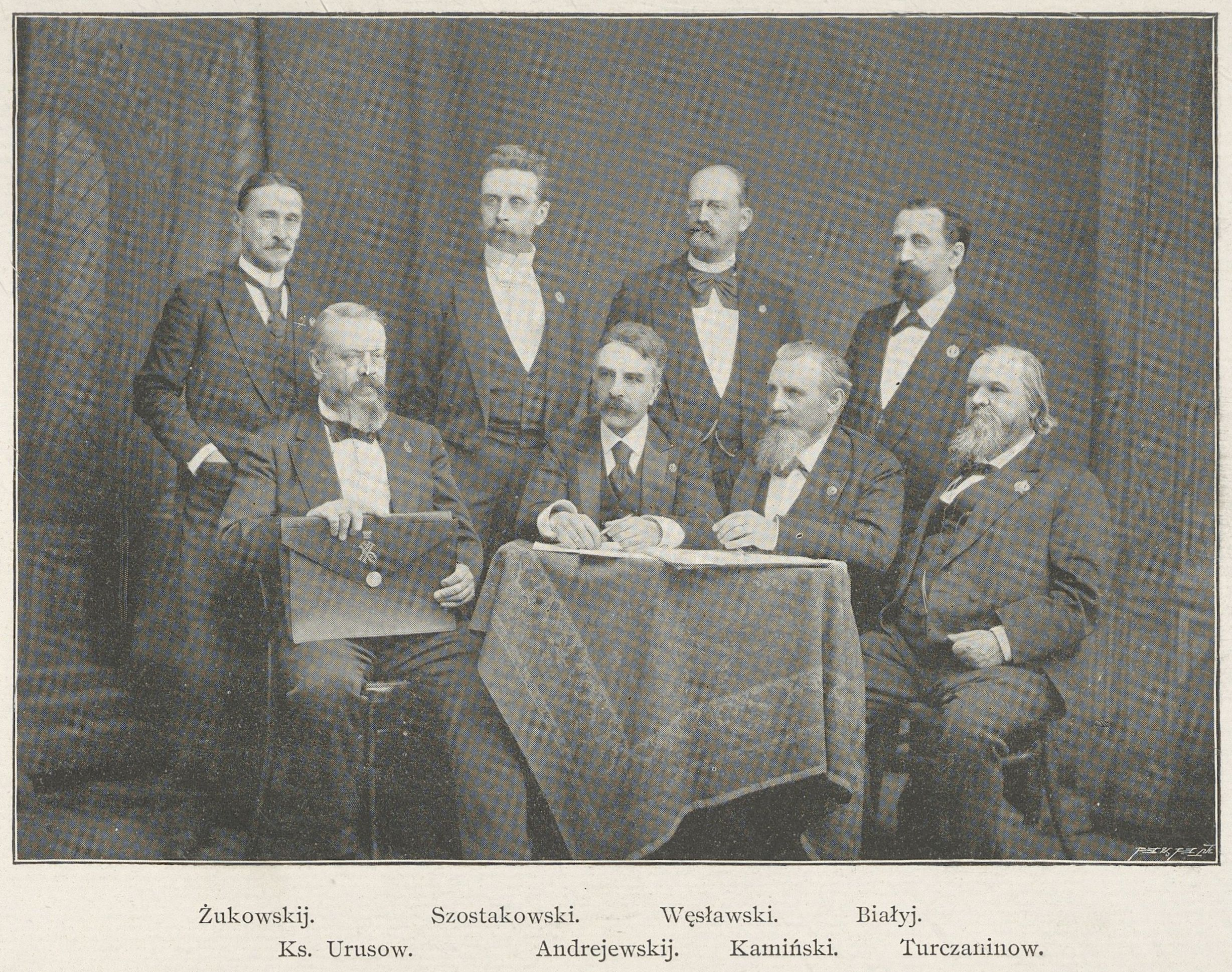
Defenders of the victims of Kražiai massacre; Michał Węsławski is in the second row, third to the left

In 1894, he took part in the preparation of the defense, and later in the trial itself as an assistant defense attorney for the victims of the Kražiai massacre. During the trial, together with Stanislovas Raila, he also served as an interpreter for peasants who spoke only the Samogitian dialect of Lithuania and did not know Russian. After the trial, in 1895, he became chairman of the Commission of Sworn Attorneys of the Vilnius Court Chamber. He probably also took part in the defense of Emilia Węsławska, the wife of his brother Witold, who was accused of violating the law, because she was speaking Polish publicly in a store. In 1899 he took part in raising funds for the renovation of St. Anne's Church (the first renovation of a Catholic church in Vilnius since 1863) and St. Michael's Church. In 1905, Michał Węsławski became a contributor to the first Polish daily newspaper published in Vilnius in years, Kurier Litewski, founded by Hipolit Korwin-Milewski. The first issue of the paper appeared on 14 September 1905.

In 1900, he and his friends: Restytut Sumorok, Michał Minkiewicz and Tadeusz Wróblewski renewed the Towarzystwo Szubrawców fraternal organization that had existed in Vilnius at the beginning of the 19th century. They called themselves Neoszubrawcy to distinguish themselves from the predecessors. Węsławski adopted the nickname "Wadwicz" and the dignity of "Grand Warden of the Shovel," which gave him the right to interrupt anyone who referred to an issue or led a polemic. The society had 33 members at its peak. The society was a place for the exchange of views on local and national issues, the members had different political views and were united by their progressiveness. Many of them belonged to the Krajowcy milieu.

=== In the Vilnius City Council ===
In May 1897, he was elected to the Vilnius City Council, where he sat until 1905. Among the 54 councillors, there were six Russians, two of them ex officio, and five Jewish councillors nominated by the governor, as Jews did not have the right to vote. The city's constitution was based on the 1870 Cities Law, which was introduced to the Northwestern Krai in 1876. Power in the city belonged to the City Council (Duma), which was elected for a four-year term; the City Board and Mayor were elected from among the councilors. The majority of Polish councillors gave the opportunity to elect Józef Montwiłł as president, but the election was not approved by Interior Minister Ivan Goremykin. A repeat vote in December led to the election of a Russian, Pavel Vasilevich Berthold. This was the second attempt to elect a Pole to the post; in 1893, the election of Antoni Tyszkiewicz was cancelled in a similar manner. The next town council elections were held in April 1901, the composition of the council changed slightly. Berhold remained in his position. One of the magistrate's major achievements was the launch of Vilnius' power plant in January 1903, the first in the Western Krai.

In 1904, Governor-General of Vilna Pyotr Sviatopolk-Mirsky organized a ceremony to unveil a statue of Catherine the Great in Vilnius. Because he was leaving his post to become Minister of the Interior, he invited Polish landowners to the unveiling of the monument, in return promising them to bring the rights of the Polish nobility on a par with those of the Russian nobility. Węsławski was among those who were invited in person. Despite this, he was not present at the ceremony, which was attended by about 50 Poles. A wave of criticism from the Polish public fell on them, and they were called kataryniarze.

During the revolutionary period, a state of emergency was imposed in Vilnius on 3 May 1905. The councillors worked to calm the situation, Węsławski was at the head of a committee negotiating with the workers of the city bakeries.

=== In the State Duma ===
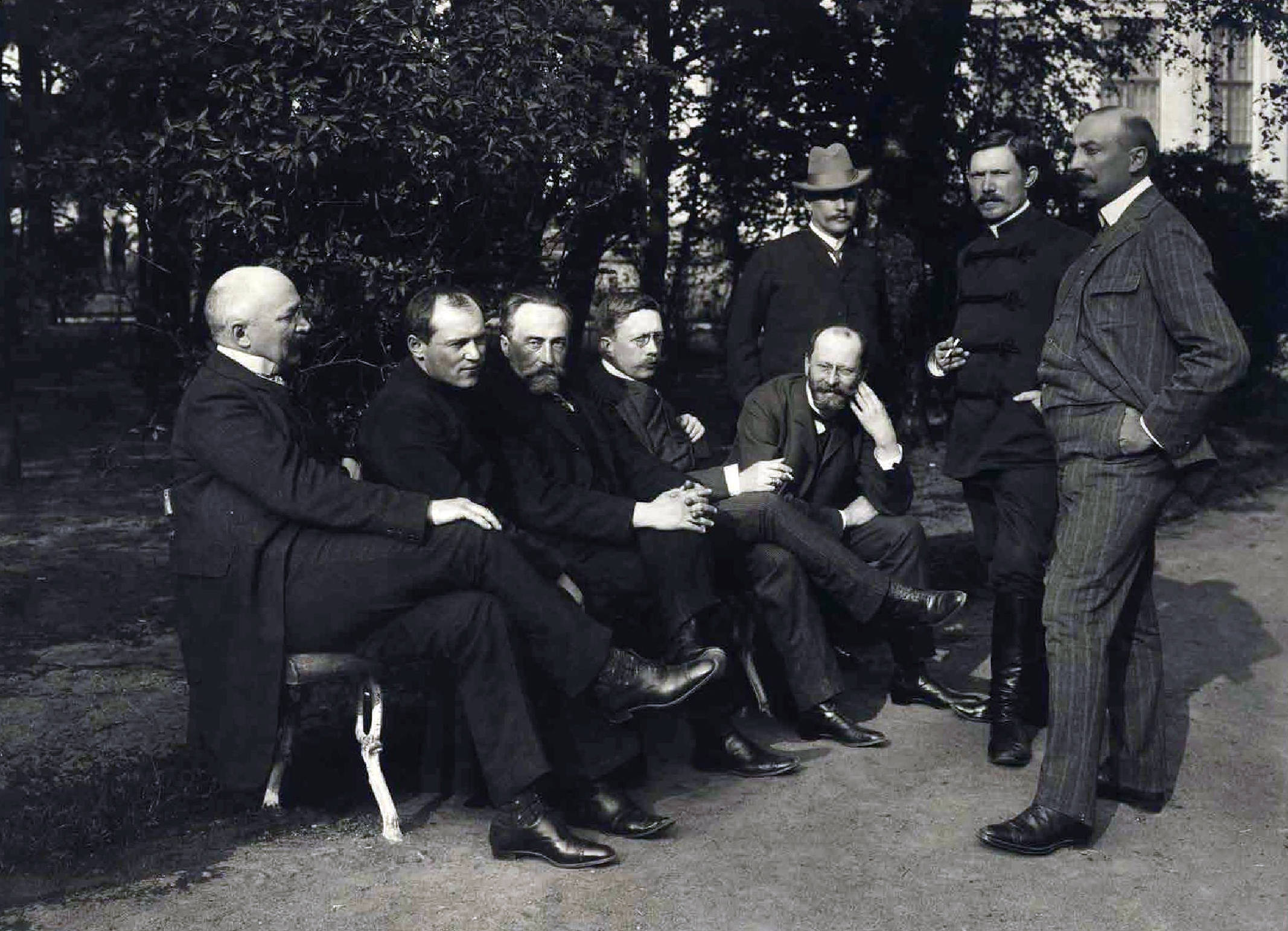
Michał Węsławski (first right sitting) among other Polish delegates to the 2nd State Duma, St. Petersburg, 1907.

In 1905, he ran unsuccessfully for the State Duma from the Šiauliai district and the city of Vilnius. As mayor, he also organized the election process himself. The election in Vilna was won by Shmaryahu Levin.

After the first Duma was dissolved after 10 weeks, re-elections were organized. On 6 and 7 December 1906, a convention of delegates of Polish electoral committees from Western Krai took place in Vilnius, in the apartment of Aleksander Chomiński. The delegates established a joint election committee of Lithuania and Ruthenia, and pledged to establish a Kresy Circle in the Duma to cooperate with the Polish Circle, which would include deputies from the Congress Poland. This time Węsławski ran only in Vilnius and as the only candidate supported by all Polish parties.

Lithuanians refused to support his candidacy and presented Jonas Basanavičius as their candidate. The Jewish candidate was Oscar Gruzenberg. The election of electors took place on 28 January 1907. Poles won 47 electoral seats and Jews won 33. The final vote on 19 February was a formality, with Węsławski winning it by 44 to 31 votes.

In an interview with the Kurier Litewski, when asked about his views, he replied:

As a Pole and a citizen of our country, I will always strive for an autonomous system not only for the Kingdom of Poland, but also for Lithuania with Belarus and other countries that show tendencies in this direction. Equality for all without distinction of nationality and religion is a slogan to which I have never embezzled.

He also advocated enfranchisement reform, but on the condition that it be carried out by local authorities, not St. Petersburg. He also advocated electoral reform. He was one of 46 Polish deputies there, and was active in the Kresy Circle, which he became a president of. He was also a member of three committees: Finance, Personal Integrity, and Public Education. During the Duma, he took part in work on the reform of local courts, the introduction of zemstvo in the Western Krai and supported the rejected proposal to introduce autonomy for the Congress Poland.

The Second Duma functioned for more than three months, after which it was dissolved by a decree of the Emperor Nicholas II. Along with the decree dissolving the Duma, a new electoral law was announced severely limiting the number of deputies of national minorities. Węsławski returned to Vilnius. He was offered to run for the Duma again, but refused.

=== President of Vilnius ===
==== First term ====
The 1905 elections were held under new conditions: 971 people were eligible to vote, they were mostly Poles and Jews, and a small group of Russians, the number of councillors was increased by 10. Jewish circles, demanding full voting rights, boycotted the elections and refused to accept the positions of nominated councillors. The Polish circles decided to fight for the full pot and to win the position of president. Only 300 eligible voters took part in the 9–10 June vote. Of the 65 council seats, 56 Poles were elected, with six seats earmarked for Jews left vacant, who eventually decided to join the council. Neither the incumbent mayor nor anyone from the City Board got into the city council. On 2 October 1905, elections were held for mayor, which Węsławski won decisively by a ratio of 57 votes to 10. Mieczysław Malinowski and Aleksander Łapiński were elected to the City Board.

29 October saw the shooting of Governor Konstantin von Pahlen at a General Jewish Labour Bund rally; in response, police and Cossacks began firing into the crowd; 40 people were wounded, five died, including three on the spot. The next day there was a general strike in the city. The so-called October Manifesto, issued on 30 October, failed to calm the situation in the city, and there were further riots and casualties. A group of councilors, including Węsławski, organized a people's assembly on 2 November, at which representatives of most of the city's population groups showed up. Adolf Zmaczynski was appointed chairman, and speeches were made in national languages, demanding punishment of the guilty, the appointment of the city militia and the withdrawal of troops. The city council undertook to carry out these demands, but they were blocked by the central administration. The October Manifesto introduced freedom of language, therefore the councilors submitted a request to the governor for the use of Polish during the swearing-in, as well as in the ongoing work of the magistrate and the introduction of bilingual signs on municipal buildings and with street names. This request was later rejected. Michał Węsławski finally took office on 2 December 1905, with Mieczysław Malinowski as his elected deputy. It was a significant event, since until then it had been impossible for a Pole to run a governorate city.

At the beginning of Węsławski's tenure, Vilnius was a civilizationally backward city for its size. The water supply covered only a few streets in the downtown area, and there was no sewage system at all. The streets were lit by gas, in addition, the monopoly on gas supply was held by the Neue Gas Actien Gesellschaft, which imposed high prices on the city. Only a quarter of the streets were paved. The network of schools and public transportation was poor, and hospitals were lacking. The new authorities began preparatory work for the construction of a municipal gas plant, a water supply system, an electric tramway, and to sort out the city's waste disposal. However, a lack of funds stood in the way. Finally, in mid-1907, a water supply project by Oskar Smerker and a sewerage system by Edward Szymański were selected.

In the autumn of 1907, Konrad Niedziałkowski became the new Deputy Mayor of Vilnius. At the same time, an affair came to light involving the person of Michał Kuźmicz Pasternacki, the town's bookkeeper, who had worked since 1876. It turned out that during this time he had embezzled about 161,000 rubles. Nevertheless, thanks to the repair of the public finances, the city achieved a surplus of income over expenditure for the first time in years in 1908. In 1908, Węsławski was honored with a biography in the Golden Book of the Russian Empire. Creators of Russia, it was a publication created on the initiative of the imperial family, in which the names of 130 living people who contributed to the development of Russia were placed. There were only the names of three city mayors: Moscow, St. Petersburg and Vilnius. In 1909, the city attempted to obtain a loan of 12 million rubles for necessary investments. Same year the issue of an electric tramway moved forward, a decision was made to build a city slaughterhouse, and a traffic law was passed. In June, permission was given for the construction of the Mariavite, Karaite and Tatar cemeteries in Kuprianiszki (now part of Rasos district).

In 1906, a theater committee was formed, under which all theater troupes in the city were subordinate. This led to the resurrection of the Polish theater in Vilnius in the same year following the arrival of the actress Nuna Młodziejowska. The theater was previously closed in 1864. In 1906 the Vilnius branch of the Sokół sportive association was registered. In 1907, Węsławski agreed to the establishment of the Society of Friends of Science in Wilno, which set up a museum to which Węsławski privately donated a number of gifts. A separate Museum of Science and Art was established by Count Władysław Tyszkiewicz in the same year. In 1907 Society of National Education Oświata was registered and was able to function fully legal, but such state lasted only about year, because soon it was disbanded by the Russian authorities. Plans to open a university had already appeared among Vilnius intelligentsia much earlier, at least since the beginning of the century. In January 1908, Deputy Minister of Education Osip Gerasimov, who was in Vilnius, gave preliminary approval for the opening of the Polytechnic. Following this conversation, Węsławski immediately appointed a city commission on the matter. On 4 May, a convention of city activists and cultural and scientific institutions from the six governorates took place. The majority of the meeting's participants favored a mixed university, which would be established first as an agricultural school, with additional faculties added later.

In 1908, Węsławski became close to the Krajowców community, becoming a member of the Union of Social Work in Lithuania and White Ruthenia. It was a conservative organization striving to improve the economic and social situation on the basis of transnational cooperation.

==== Second term ====
In the summer of 1909, another city council election took place. This time 69 councilors were elected directly, seven Jewish councilors came by nomination. In the end, the council included 56 Poles, 10 Russians, seven Jews, one Lithuanian (Antanas Vileišis), a German and a Karaite each. The mayoral election, held on 12 November, was again won by Michał Węsławski. Not long after his re-election, in early March 1910, Węsławski was suspended as president due to the ongoing investigation of Pasternacki. His position was assumed by Konrad Niedziałkowski. Despite the suspension, he was a member of Vilnius' official delegation to Eliza Orzeszkowa's funeral in Grodno, Belarus. The delegation consisted of three more councilors: Russian Leonid Povolotskiy, Jew Orel Lipiec, and Lithuanian Antanas Vileišis. The issue of the loan encountered difficulties in St. Petersburg, so the councilors decided to limit investments to an electric tramway, a water supply system and, of necessity, a sewage system. The loan amount thus dropped to 8.5 million rubles. Eventually Ministry of interior agreed to a loan of 4,244 million rubles for the water supply and sewage system only.

On 8 January, former Vilnius Mayor Pavel Vasilevich Berthold and current Mayor Michał Węsławski were indicted in connection with the "Pasternacki affair," along with a number of City Board members. Tadeusz Wróblewski became Węsławski's lawyer. The trial began on 30 May 1911 in Grodno. Berthold and his associates were accused of failing to supervise, while Węsławski and his associates were accused of failing to report the abuse case early enough. The verdict was announced the next day, Węsławski was found guilty of "negligence of duty." However, the punishment was not carried out due to the statute of limitations. Ultimately, Węsławski returned to the office in August 1911.

In mid-1911, the city council decided to build a municipal theater. In March 1912, a project by Czesław Przybylski was selected, and Lukiškės Square was selected as a location of theater. Independently, Hipolit Korwin-Milewski decided to build his own theater on Wielka Pohulanka Street (today Jonas Basanavičius Street), which was later named "Theater on Pohulanka". At the end of 1911, the issue of a higher education institution returned. The head of the education committee of the city council, Russian Nikolai Sobolev, proposed opening a school to celebrate the 300th anniversary of the Romanov dynasty and naming it after the ruling dynasty. The idea was approved by the council, along with the need to take out a million-ruble loan. In April 1913 came a reply from the Ministry of Education stating that it was too early for a university in Vilnius. Another attempt was made to form a delegation, representing the nationalities and religions of the city, to submit a memorandum to an audience with the emperor. However, this request was rejected in August 1913.

In November 1911, the Vilnius governor Dmitry Lyubimov finally approved engineer Edward Szenfeld of Warsaw as the contractor for Vilnius' water supply and sewerage system. Changes had to be made to the council-approved water supply project, which envisioned the placement of water tanks on Castle Hill, after protests from archaeologists and the intervention of the Imperial Archaeological Society. Eventually works started in April 1912. At the instigation of Ferdynand Ruszczyc, a municipal photographic archive was created, and Jan Bułhak, as city photographer, from 1912 created photographic documentation of the city, primarily of its monuments. In the fall of 1912, the city donated a plot of land for the erection of a church dedicated to the Sacred Heart, the author of the project of which was Antoni Wiwulski. In December, Węsławski traveled with Adam Piłsudski to England to finalize the loan and arrange the issue of bonds. They returned to the city in February 1913.

In May 1913, Michał Węsławski was a member of a delegation to celebrate the 300th anniversary of the Romanov dynasty. In addition to him, the delegation consisted of the gubernial nobility marshal Szymon Krassowski, Count Wiktor Starżeński, district clerk Janusz Jagmin, Grodno mayor Edward Listowski, Lida mayor Leon Wismont, peasant representative Piotr Wituszka from Nowa Wilejka, Karaite delegate Izaak Firkowicz, Old Believers Arseniusz Pimonow, and Rabbi Izaak Rubinsztejn. A municipal pharmacy was opened in November 1913.

==== Third term and war ====
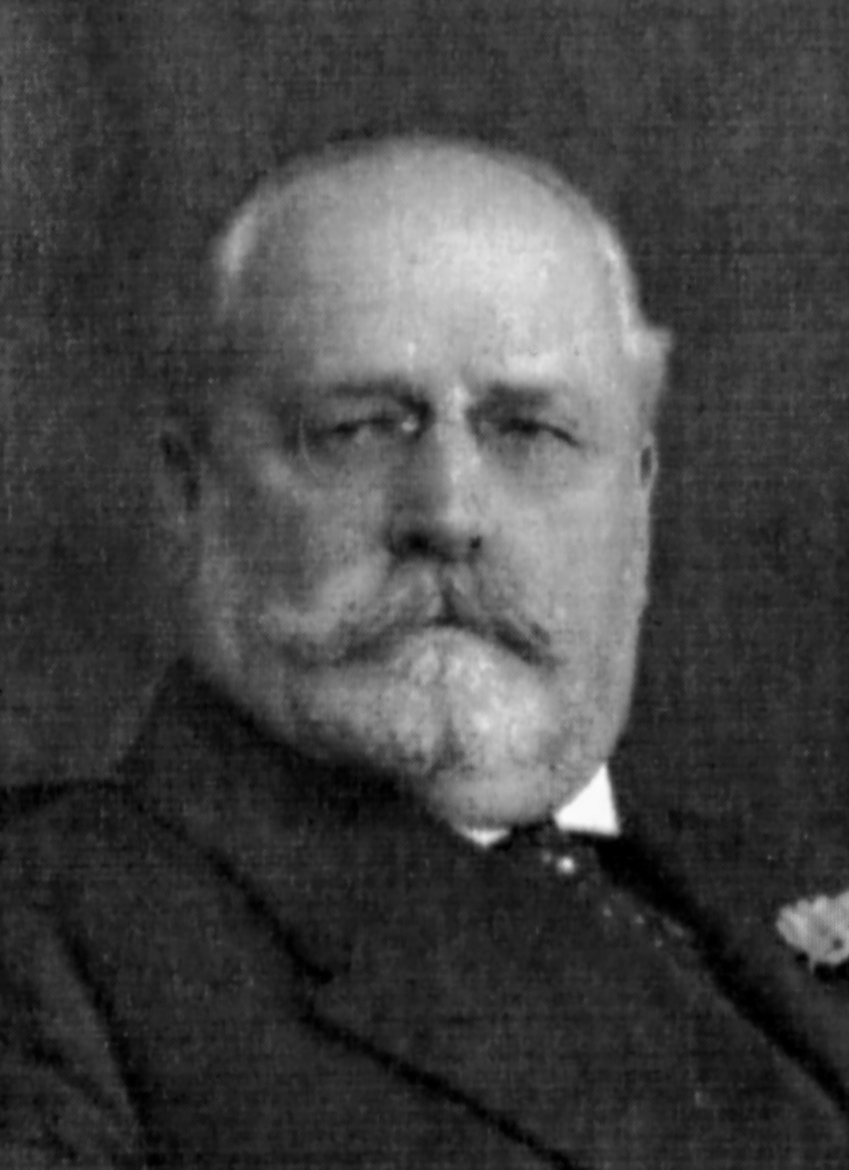
Michał Węsławski, c. 1914.

In the elections held in November 1913, 1,360 people were able to take part. The number of councilors was increased to 80, of whom seven were Jews by nomination. Among the elected councilors were 59 Poles, 11 Russians, two Lithuanians and one Karaite. Among others, Witold Węsławski became a councilor. Michał Węsławski received the highest number of 506 votes. February 1914 saw the election of the city's mayor. Michal Węsławski won by a ratio of 71 votes to 6. In March 1914, the Interior Ministry approved a loan of 468,000 rubles for the construction of the city theater. In the summer, a loan of 4.05 million rubles was approved for the construction of an electric tramway.

With the outbreak of war, the city government was subordinated to the military authorities. In Vilnius it was General Paul von Rennekampf, commander of the 1st Russian Army, and then General Nikolai Tumanov. The only permitted activities were committees to help victims of the war. Russian, Belarusian, Lithuanian, Jewish and Polish committees were established in Vilnius. The president cooperated with all of them, and himself chaired the Polish Committee for Relief of Victims of War. A large number of refugees, primarily from East Prussia, swept through the city, it was more than 55,000 people in 1914, the second wave came in mid 1915, mainly from Suwałki Governorate. The City Board organized a lot of initiatives to help them, including employing them in the construction of the sewage system.

On 16 August 1914, the Polish Supreme National Committee was established in Kraków, which was under Austrian rule; the Węsławski brothers became members of the Vilnius circle of the committee, but it did not develop much activity. In early August, the evacuation of the city began, with Russian institutions and officials primarily leaving the city. The city council numbered only 40 people. A Civic Guard was established to replace the Russian gendarmerie; in Vilnius, Feliks Zawadzki headed it.

At the end of August, the Citizens’ Committee was formed, covering the Kaunas and Vilnius Governorates, uniting all nationalities of the region. Its chairman was Stanisław Kognowicki, with Jonas Vileišis as his deputy. The City Board and the City Council did not want to give up power, and Węsławski reported a willingness to supplement the membership with missing councilors. Governor Pyotr Veryovkin, upon leaving the city, acknowledged the Citizens' Committee and the Civic Guard. Retreating Russian troops damaged city's bridges, electric plant and gasworks on the way out. On 18 September 1915, German forces entered the city.

Colonel Traugott Graf von Pfeil und Klein-Ellguth became commander of the city. He met with the mayor and the city council, and recognized the Citizens' Guard as a policing service in the city. He also issued a proclamation printed in German, Polish and Russian, in which he called Vilnius "the pearl of the Polish Kingdom." The delay in printing the proclamation was the reason for the arrest of, among others, Węsławski. The president was released the next day. The contents of the proclamation became the cause of protests by Lithuanians, among others. As a result, the commandant ordered it to be taken down from the walls soon. Soon his place was taken by General Adalbert Wegner, with a title of Governor. On 22 September, Eldor Pohl became the Chief Mayor (German: Oberbürgermeister) by German appointment, while Hans Weisseborn became the Second Mayor. The city was also the headquarters of the commander of the 10th Army, Gen. Hermann von Eichhorn.

The city council stopped formal meetings, so the problem of co-opting additional councilors ceased to exist. The City Board continued to function, and the Germans also recognized the Citizens’ Committee. The city's Governor, Wegner, worked most closely with the municipal authorities, requiring frequent reports from Feliks Zawadzki and Michal Węsławski on the situation in the city. Chief Mayor Pohl was very active, establishing contact with all organizations in the city. Pohl's importance grew while the role of Michał Węsławski and the City Board continued to diminish, mainly through their fear of the imminent return of the Russians. Therefore, they preferred not to take drastic steps, still keeping records in Russian, for example, when all other Polish institutions had switched to the Polish language.

By October 1915, the Germans created an administrative unit called the German Administration of Vilnius (German: Die Deutsche Verwaltung Wilna), which was formed by a 20-kilometer strip around the city, headed by Rudolf von Beckerath, who was also head of the German police. Adalbert Wegner was the Governor of the Imperial Governorate of Vilnius (German: Das Kaiserliche Gouvernement Wilna), which was limited to the city itself. It was unclear how those two bodies relate to each other, but in general von Beckerath was responsible for civilian matters.

On 24 October, the German authorities invited representatives of the city council, the Civic Committee and the Catholic Diocese, all Poles, to a courtesy meeting. Soon, however, there was a change in German policy, which stopped favoring Poles and began to limit their influence. The memoirists assess Węsławski's attitude as passive. According to Czeslaw Jankowski: "Mayor Węsławski most completely lost his resonance; he settled down, grew dim; during meetings, in front of representatives of German authorities, he usually did not even raise his voice." The City Administration was ordered to conduct on 1 November 1915 a limited census of Vilnius residents to determine the number who were eligible for food ration cards. Węsławski instructed the militia to carry out the task. In March 1916 Germans themselves conducted a second census of the entire province.

In November 1915, conflicts over the distribution of refugee aid led to divisions within the Citizens’ Committee. Lithuanians left the committee. The Germans took over the distribution of external aid, and limited the committee's activities to the city itself. This practically deprived it of its significance, as it was intended to represent the community of Kaunas and Vilnius governorates. Committee was formally disbanded on 26 January 1916. In its place, the Polish Committee was established in December 1916, with Michał Węsławski as its chairman and Władysław Zawadzki as his deputy. Within the committee, divisions were strong between the nationalist Endecja and the more liberal-minded Krajowcy group. Increasing German repression, the curtailment of Polish education, and the promotion of other nationality groups, gave the former an advantage.

The German administration of the city was growing. In view of this, the former City Board was abolished in early 1916. Several boardsmen and councilors became members of the Municipal Advisory Board (German: Städtischer Beirat), which was responsible, under German supervision and without influence over finances, for food supply, education, medical treatment, road repair, etc. At the same time Michał Węsławski officially lost his position as mayor of Vilnius.

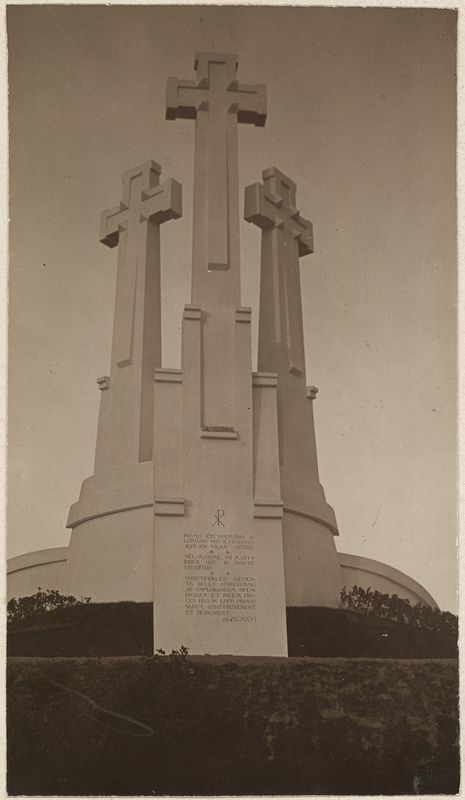
Three Crosses monument, c. 1916

One of the successful endeavours of the time of occupation was the erection of the Three Crosses monument on the Bald Hill, designed by Antoni Wiwulski; Michał Węsławski was one of the initiators. He was also at the excavation of the remains of participants in the January Uprising on the Castle Hill.

An already difficult humanitarian situation began to worsen, especially in the autumn of 1916, as famine spread. The situation was compounded by the indifferent attitude of the German authorities, interested in looting the city of militarily usable metals; streetcar tracks, among other things, were pillaged. Węsławski and a coworker began a campaign to hide the most valuable parts of the city's infrastructure, with a view to its later restoration.

Employees of the place founded the Mutual Aid Society of Employees of Municipal Institutions "Samopomoc", Węsławski became a member of the Supervisory Board. Together with Countess Maria Krystyna Tyszkiewicz, he organized a "Lutnia" concert for this purpose. On 12 May, the Polish Committee for Relief of Victims of War, of which Węsławski was chairman, along with committees of other nationalities living in Vilnius, sent a letter to the German Chancellor Theobald von Bethmann Hollweg describing the catastrophic situation in the city and demanding help. The document was signed, in addition to Węsławski: Władysław Zawadzki, Samuel Rosenbaum, Andrius Domaševičius, Anton Luckievich and Franciszek Eidukewicz, representing the labor unions. They also asked for reception of delegation Franz-Joseph zu Isenburg-Birstein, who in late 1915 became the new governor of the city.

The Germans removed successively members of the former municipal authorities from the Municipal Advisory Board. In December 1916, anticipating the Germans' move, Węsławski himself resigned his membership. Only Niedziałkowski remained. Węsławski since then became more involved in the activities of the Polish Committee, of which he was chairman. In view of the increasing promotion of Lithuanians and Belarusians, and the restriction of the rights of Poles, the Committee decided to fight for the Polishness of the city and the country. In November 1916, they informed the German chancellor Theobald von Bethmann Hollweg that the Poles of Lithuania and Belarus were only interested in a settlement that would ensure their territorial unity with Poland. On 15 January 1917, the Committee sent a message to the nascent Provisional Council of State of the Kingdom of Poland, a day after it was established, that Polish society in Lithuania welcomes its establishment and that they hope of the renewal of the ties that have bound Lithuania to the Crown over the centuries. On 24 May, the Polish Committee sent a new letter to the German Chancellor, once again declaring the will of the Polish people for statehood with Poland as a federated state, with respect for the rights of other nationalities. At the time, Michał Węsławski also prepared an extensive Memorial on Food Matters (Polish: Memoriał w sprawach żywnościowych), in which he described the social, economic and political situation of the city and Lithuania. It was sent to the chancellery of the German Reich and to the Polish Circle in Vienna.

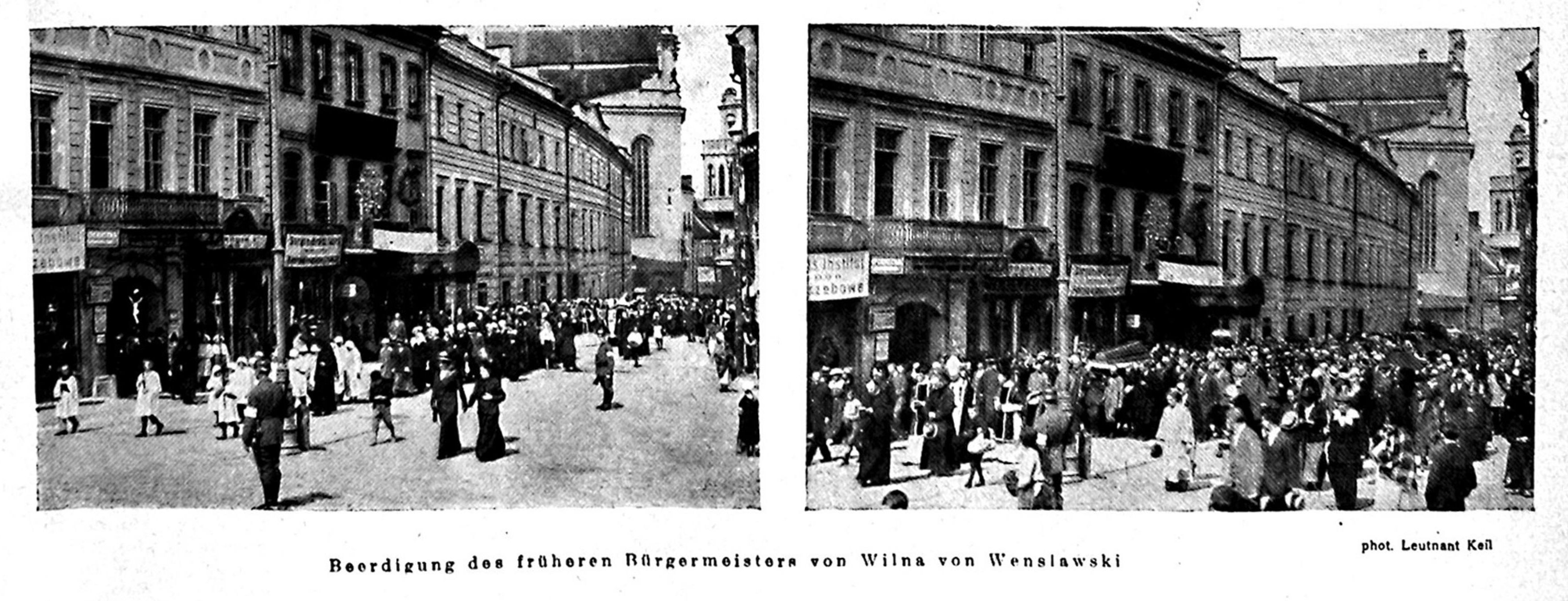
Funeral of Michał Węsławski. Photo published in the "Zeitung der 10. Armee"

On 22 August 1917, during a meeting, Michał Węsławski fainted and was taken away by ambulance. Despite resuscitation, he died of a heart attack at 11 p.m. His body was laid to rest at St. John's Church. The news of the death was reported by Polish newspapers in many cities, exceptionally it was also reported by the German 10th Army newspaper. The Germans lifted some of the restrictions, regarding demonstrations, for the funeral, which brought together a large part of the city's population. The body was carried through the Old Town to the Rossa cemetery. The service was conducted by the administrator of the Vilnius diocese, Father Kazimierz Mikołaj Michalkiewicz. The funeral of the President of Vilnius was attended by delegations of all city organizations, without distinction of religion or nationality.

== Bibliography ==
- Dąbrowski, Przemysław (2011). Siła w kulturze, jedność w narodzie. Wileńska działalność społeczno-polityczna Michała, Witolda i Emilii Węsławskich w końcu XIX wieku i pierwszej połowie XX wieku [Strength in culture, unity in the nation. Social and political activity of Michał, Witold and Emilia Węsławskis in Vilnius at the end of the 19th century and the first half of the 20th century] (in Polish). Gdańsk.
- Gimžauskas, Edmundas (2014). "Institutions for the Administration of Vilnius at the Beginning of the German Occupation during the First World War". Lithuanian Historical Studies. 19: 135–174. doi:10.30965/25386565-01901006.
- Jacek Wałdoch, Wybory do Rady Miejskiej i Zarządu Miejskiego miasta Wilna w latach 1905–1913, "Miscellanea Historico-Iuridica", vol. 11 (2012), pp. 255–274.
- Wołkanowski, Waldemar (2015). Michał Węsławski. Biografia prezydenta Wilna w latach 1905–1916 [Michał Węsławski. Biography of the President of Vilnius in 1905–1916] (in Polish). Opole.
