= Kęstaičiai =

- Village
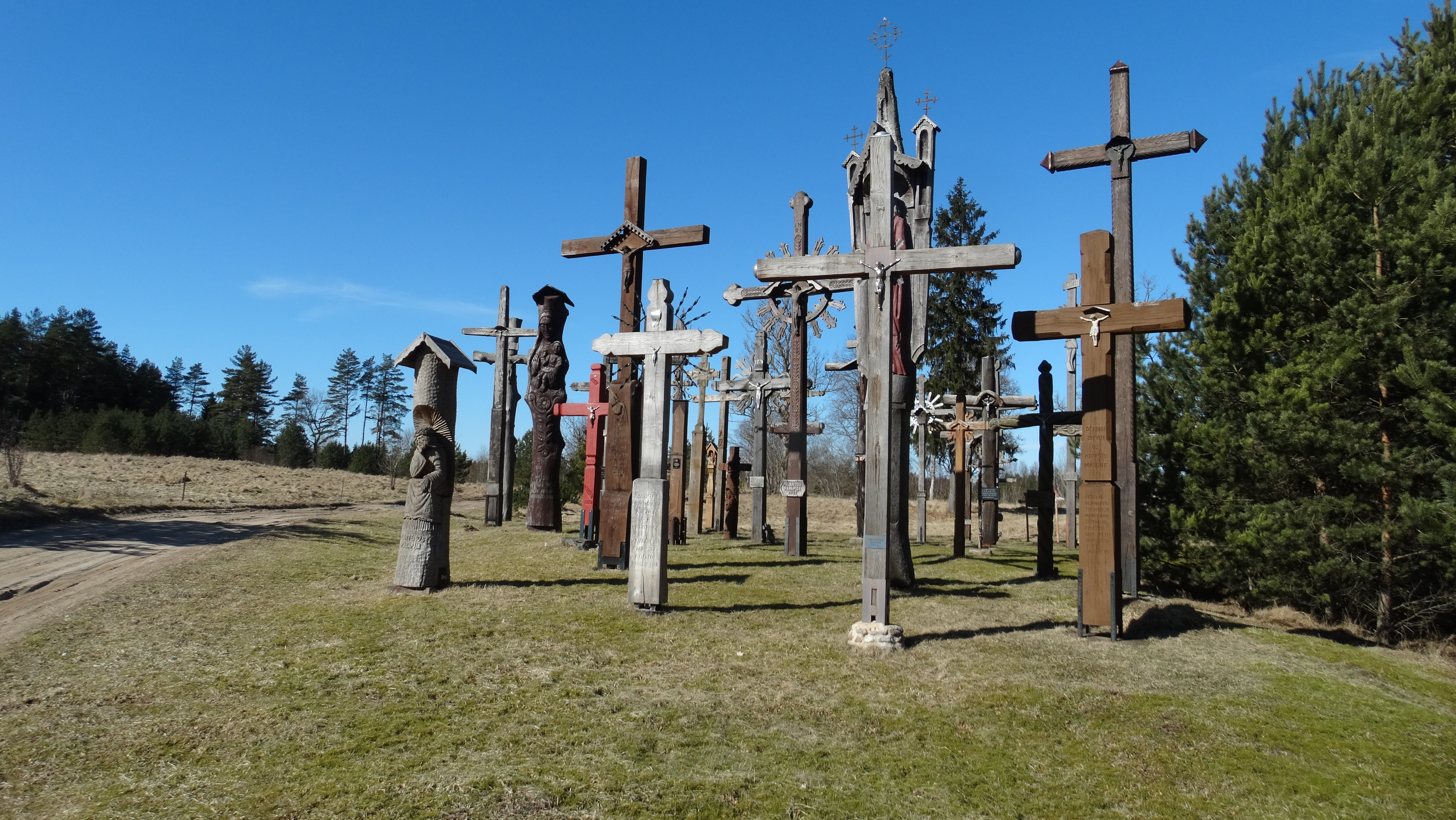

- Location of Kęstaičiai
- Coordinates: 56°01′01″N 22°07′48″E
- Country: Lithuania
- County: Telšiai County
- Municipality: Telšiai District Municipality
- Eldership: Gadūnavas Elderate
- Manor mentioned: 1586

Population (2011)
  - Total: 32
- Time zone: UTC+2 (EET)
  - Summer (DST): UTC+3 (EEST)

Kęstaičiai is a village in Telšiai District Municipality, Lithuania. According to the 2011 census, it had 32 residents.

== History ==
The village grew around the manor, which was first mentioned in 1586 and belonged to the Kęstavičiai family. A chapel for the victims of the 1710 plague was built in the cemetery in 1715. The manor was inherited by Jonas Antanas Šandys-Rimgaila, who in 1738 bequested his landholdings to the Brotherhood of Saint Roch. According to a legend, he was requested to do so in a dream of his only son, who wanted to become a priest but died young. The Brotherhood established a small monastery, a hospital/shelter for the poor and the disabled, and a church dedicated to Saint Roch. The hospital was intended for 24 people (12 men and 12 women). The village received royal privileges from Augustus III of Poland allowing it to hold regular markets and fairs. Pope Pius VI allowed the village to hold festivals (Lithuanian: atlaidai) of Saint Roch and Saint Fabian and even sent relic of Saint Roch. The first church burned down in 1808, but it was rebuilt in 1820.

As a reprisal for the Uprising of 1831, Tsarist authorities confiscated majority of the landholdings of the Brotherhood in 1842. No longer able to finance its activities, the Brotherhood dissolved and the hospital was converted into a home for elderly priests. After the Uprising of 1863, Alexander III of Russia signed the order to close the Church of St. Roch and transfer its property to a newly built Orthodox church in Skuodas. Local residents raised money to send 5 men with a petition, signed by 300 people, to Saint Peterburg to convince the Tsar to keep the church open. For a couple of months they organized a constant guard of up to 100 locals to defend the church from Russian policemen. On October 19, 1886, a group of Cossacks, personally commanded by Governor of Kaunas, forcefully captured the church and devastated it. Many were injured and 43 people were arrested. Few of its valuables were taken to Telšiai and Alsėdžiai. The church and adjoining buildings were leveled in 1887. It was the first instance of local resistance to Russification policies, 5 years before the better known Kražiai massacre. The located of the former church is now marked by several crosses carved by local artists in 2006.

The village had 132 residents in 1923, 104 residents in 1959, and 38 resident in 1989. During the Soviet era, Kęstaičiai hosted a training ground for tanks (tankodromas).
