= Brotherhood of Saint Roch =

Religious institute in Lithuania

The Brotherhood of Saint Roch (Lithuanian: Rokitai; Polish: Rochici; Latin: Fratres Misericordiae sub titulo S. Rochi) was a Catholic religious institute in the Grand Duchy of Lithuania. Named after Saint Roch, the brotherhood was founded in 1705 by the Franciscan tertiary Jonas Jarolavičius in Vilnius.

During its existence, the brotherhood maintained primitive hospitals and shelters (Lithuanian: špitolė) for the sick and the disabled in five locations: Vilnius (1708–1799), Kęstaičiai (1738–1842), Varniai (1743–1842), Kaunas (1750–1824), and Minsk (1752–1821). It is not known whether the brothers had any kind of medical education. It is known that they hired paramedics, doctors, and surgeons, including women nurses who could take care of their female patients. A significant number of the patients in Vilnius and Kaunas had sexually transmitted diseases; other Catholic hospitals refused to treat such patients. The brotherhood also sheltered pregnant women and their abandoned children. Other patients sought help for injuries, tuberculosis, rheumatism, arthritis, etc. In Kęstaičiai, Varniai, and Minsk, the hospital was really a shelter where physically and mentally disabled persons could live for the rest of their lives.

It was never a large society. At any given time, there were about 8 brothers in Vilnius and Varniai, and about 5 brothers elsewhere. It ceased to exist in 1842 when, as reprisal for the Uprising of 1831, authorities of the Russian Empire confiscated its land, which was the source of its revenue. Similar institutes active in the Grand Duchy were Brothers Hospitallers of St. John of God (Lithuanian: bonifratrai) and Sisters of Charity (Lithuanian: šaritės).

== History ==
=== In Vilnius ===
The brotherhood was established by Jonas Jarolavičius from Joniškis who sold his inheritance and founded a new church and hospital near the Vilnius Castle Complex. Due to financial difficulties, the buildings were small and poor. The new society soon faced a great challenge of the plague of 1710 and became famous for its dedication. The brothers would collect the dead and transport them to Šnipiškės for burial. All of the brothers perished during the plague. Bishop of Vilnius Konstanty Kazimierz Brzostowski became direct superior of the society in 1713. He renamed and reorganized it. The brothers took the traditional vows of chastity, poverty, and obedience. Brzostowski added an additional vow of caring for the sick. The brothers were required to wear ash color habit, black cloak and hat. The left sleeve had to have an image of a skull – a memento mori. The brotherhood had its own regula, confirmed by the bishop in 1726 and 1743.

In 1715, the brotherhood was given the small Church of St. Stephen and hospital of St. Lazarus near the present-day Vilnius railway station. The church and the hospital was in a poor condition and required extensive repairs. The brotherhood also established four or five infirmaries in Vilnius. According to inspection reports from 1788 and 1797, the brotherhood had 68 and 63 patients in Vilnius, respectively. A 1786 report also noted that due to poor conditions, the brotherhood should not take on more than 40 patients at a time. A 1790 report lamented that instead of caring for the poor, the hospital in Vilnius would accept only those with connections (e.g. servants of the wealthy residents). There are known cases when patients had to pay for their treatment.

In 1797, a special city commission decided to establish the main hospital in Vilnius. It was determined that the Church of St. Philip and St. Jacob was the most suitable location to house 200 poor and 50 sick people. That mean that other smaller hospitals would be merged into this new hospital and then liquidated. It is unknown what happened to the brothers after their hospital was closed.

=== Elsewhere ===
The brotherhood expanded outside Vilnius in 1738 when a church, monastery, and hospital were founded in Kęstaičiai in the Diocese of Samogitia. The foundation was sizable – 18 voloks of land, forest, meadows, and 2.5 lakes. This foundation was confirmed by Grand Duke Augustus III. The first church burned down in 1808, but it was rebuilt in 1820. The hospital was intended for 24 people (12 men and 12 women). Most likely it functioned more as a shelter for mentally ill rather than a hospital (its inventory books do not mention expenses for medicines or doctors). When in 1842 authorities of the Russian Empire confiscated its land, the hospital was converted into a home for the elderly priests. Its last inhabitants were transferred to the Bernardine Monastery in Kretinga in 1866.

Bishop of Samogitia Antoni Dominik Tyszkiewicz established the brotherhood in Varniai, then the seat of the diocese, in 1743. They took over an existing hospital by the Cathedral of St. Peter and St. Paul and rebuilt it by 1748. The brotherhood took care not only of the sick, but also of the elderly retired priests. In 1752, the brotherhood in the Diocese of Samogitia became subordinate to the Bishop of Samogitia, instead of the Bishop of Vilnius. That, in a way, created two branches of the brotherhood. In 1782, the brotherhood moved outside the center of the town because the new bishop Jan Stefan Giedroyć did not approve of the mentally ill loitering around the cathedral. In 1827 and 1828, the hospital had 68 and 56 patients, respectively. Most of them had severe physical and mental disabilities. The brotherhood closed in 1842 after the confiscation of its landholdings by the Tsarist authorities.

In 1750, dean of Vandžiogala founded a monastery and hospital for the brotherhood in Kaunas near the Church of St. Gertrude. The brotherhood helped with the repairs of the church in 1785–1795. In 1797, the brotherhood had 48 patients (30 men, 18 women). Of them, 14 were to remain for the rest of their lives because of severe physical and mental disabilities. After the French invasion of Russia in 1812, the church was devastated, but remained standing, while other buildings burned to the ground. Lacking financial resources, the brotherhood was unable to rebuild. An 1823 report found that the brothers, their patients, and foundlings (70–90 people in total) were crammed into a two-room building. Such poor conditions encouraged epidemics. No new brothers would join the brotherhood and the three remaining brothers were getting older. In 1824, their hospital was taken over by the Sisters of Charity.

In 1752, the brotherhood and the Church of St. Veronica were founded in Minsk by a priest. An infirmary for women was founded in 1763. After the establishment of the Diocese of Minsk in 1798, the society in Minsk became subordinate to the Bishop of Minsk. The inspection in 1820 found the hospital in a deplorable state. It stopped treating men, caring only for poor and disabled women. It lacked such basics as food and cleanliness. In addition, from 1819, the brotherhood was entrusted with the care of several dozens of arrested women. The inspector concluded that it was doing more harm than good. The hospital was liquidated the following year; any useful property was transferred to Brothers Hospitallers of St. John of God.
