= Horsewhip =

Horsewhip or horse whip may refer to:

- Crop (implement) or riding crop
- Whip
- Quirt
- Riding aids § Whip
- Horsewhip, common name for the snake species Oxybelis aeneus
